= Ballarat & Bacchus Marsh District Football League =

Australian rules football league

- Most recent season or competition: 1978
- Sport: Australian rules football
- Founded: 1912
- First season: 1912
- Folded: 1978
- No. of teams: 6 (1978), 24 (historical)
- Country: Australia
- Last champion: Dunnstown (1978)
- Most titles: Darley (16)
- Related competitions: Central Highlands FL; Clunes FL

The Ballarat & Bacchus District Marsh Football League was the final name of an Australian rules football competition consisting of clubs based in and around Bacchus Marsh and Ballarat.

== History ==
The Bacchus Marsh Football Association was formed in 1912 from the following clubs - Bacchus Marsh, Deer Park, Maddingley, Melton and Parwan.

The Bacchus Marsh Football Association initially went into recess in 1928 due to Ballan pulling out, which left only four clubs, then Bacchus Marsh and Rockbank FC's joined the Werribee District Football Association, which then changed its name to the Bacchus Marsh & Werribee District Football Association.

The Bacchus Marsh District Football Association was reformed in April 1929, at their annual meeting.

In 1930, the BMDFA became the Bacchus Marsh & Melton District Football Association.

The BM&MDFA was revived in 1945, after being in recess since 1942 due to World War Two, the competition consisted of five teams, including one new club, the 2nd Australian Army Medical Corps (AAMC) Training Battalion Football Club.

In 1949, a 20 year old Lifeguard FC player received a heavy knock to the head and later died at a local Doctor's surgery.

In 1959, the BMMDFA changed their name to the Bacchus Marsh Football League.

The competition became known as the Ballarat & Bacchus Marsh District Football League in 1973 after it absorbed 5 clubs from the defunct Ballarat District Football League.

In 1979, the Ballarat & Bacchus Marsh District FL merged with the Clunes FL to form the Central Highlands Football League.

== Clubs ==
=== Final ===
Club	Colours	Nickname	Home Ground	Former League	Est.	Years in BMFL	BMFL Senior Premierships		Fate
Club	Colours	Nickname	Home Ground	Former League	Est.	Years in BMFL	Total	Years	Fate
Bacchus Marsh		Tigers	Bacchus Marsh Showgrounds, Bacchus Marsh	GJFA	1881	1912-1915, 1919-1928, 1933-1941, 1945-1978	13	1912, 1920, 1924, 1925, 1928, 1933, 1937, 1940, 1941, 1945, 1946, 1962, 1974	Moved to Ballarat FL in 1929. Merged with Maddingley in Ballarat FL in 1979.
Ballan		Blues	Ballan Recreation Reserve, Ballan	BFA	1881	1919-1927, 1932-1941, 1945-1978	3	1932, 1948, 1956	Moved to Dunnstown & District FA in 1928. Formed Central Highlands FL in 1979
Buninyong		Bombers	Buninyong Recreation Reserve, Buninyong	BDFL	1920s	1973-1978	0	-	Formed Central Highlands FL in 1979
Darley		Magpies	Darley Park, Darley	–	1919	1919-1927, 1929, 1931-1941, 1945-1978	16	1923, 1926, 1934, 1938, 1939, 1947, 1949, 1950, 1952, 1955, 1957, 1959, 1969, 1970, 1971, 1972	Formed Central Highlands FL in 1979
Dunnstown		Towners	Dunnstown Recreation Reserve, Dunnstown	BDFL	1894	1973-1978	2	1976, 1978	Formed Central Highlands FL in 1979
Gordon		Eagles	Mount Egerton Recreation Reserve, Mount Egerton	BDFL	1890s	1924-1925, 1934-1935, 1973-1978	0	-	Moved to Dunnstown & District FA in 1926. Moved to Molesworth Competition in 1936. Formed Central Highlands FL in 1979

=== Former ===
Club	Colours	Nickname	Home Ground	Former League	Est.	Years in BMFL	BMFL Senior Premierships		Fate
Club	Colours	Nickname	Home Ground	Former League	Est.	Years in BMFL	Total	Years	Fate
2nd AAMC Battalion			Maddingley Park, Maddingley	–	1945	1945	0	-	Folded after 1945 season
Bacchus Marsh seconds		Tigers	Bacchus Marsh Showgrounds, Bacchus Marsh	–	1881	1929-1931	0	-	Entered recess after 1931 season
Balliang			Balliang Recreation Reserve, Balliang	–	1914	1914	0	-	Folded after 1914 season
Balliang-Rowsley			Balliang Recreation Reserve, Balliang	–	1929	1929-1932, 1935-1939, 1947-1948	0	-	Recess between 1933-34 and 1940-46. Folded after 1948 season
Deer Park			John McLeod Reserve, Deer Park			1912, 1923-1924	0	-	Moved to Werribee & Lara FA in 1925
Exford Stars		Stars	Melton Recreation Reserve, Melton	–	1915	1915	0	-	Folded after 1915 season
Irish National Foresters			Chirnside Park, Werribee	WDFA	1922	1928	0	-	Moved to Werribee Shire District FA in 1929
Laverton			Laverton Park, Altona Meadows	WDFA	1924	1928	0	-	Moved to Werribee Shire District FA in 1929
Lifeguard Milk Factory			Darley Park, Darley	–	1948	1948-1951	0	-	Folded in March 1952
Maddingley		Spiders	Maddingley Park, Maddingley	–	1909	1912-1915, 1931-1941, 1946-1977	8	1936, 1951, 1954, 1958, 1967, 1968, 1973, 1977	Recess between 1916-40 and 1942-45. Moved to Ballarat FL in 1978
Melton		Bloods	Melton Recreation Reserve, Melton	–	1879	1912-1915, 1919-1927, 1929-1940, 1945-1972	9	1913, 1914, 1915, 1919, 1921, 1922, 1929, 1930, 1931, 1935, 1963	Recess between 1941-44. Moved to Riddell District FL in 1973.
Meredith		Swans	Meredith Recreation Reserve, Meredith	BDFL	1890s	1973-1975	0	-	Moved to Geelong & District FL in 1976
Metro Farm		Herefords	Cocoroc Recreation Reserve, Cocoroc	WDFA	1919	1928	0	-	Moved to Werribee Shire District FA in 1929
Parwan			Parwan Recreation Reserve, Parwan	–	1912	1912-1914	0	-	Folded after 1915 season
Rockbank		Rams	Ian Cowie Recreation Reserve, Rockbank	–	1920	1920-1928, 1931-1936, 1949-1972	7	1927, 1953, 1960, 1961, 1964, 1965, 1966	Recess between 1937-48. Folded after 1972 season
Sebastopol		Burras	Marty Busch Reserve, Sebastopol	BDFL	1893	1973-1977	1	1975	Moved to Ballarat FL in 1978
Toolern Vale-Coimadai			Toolern Vale Receation Reserve, Toolern Vale	–	1929	1929-1930	0	-	Folded in early 1931
Werribee			Chirnside Park, Werribee	WDFA	1919	1928	0	-	Moved to Geelong & District FL in 1929

== Premierships ==
=== Seniors ===
	SENIORS - Grand Final Scores					
Year	Premiers	Score	Runner up	Score	Venue	Gate / Comments
Bacchus Marsh District FA
1912	Bacchus Marsh	8.12 - 60	Melton	5.6 - 36	Maddingley Park	£17/12/13
1913	Melton	6.16 - 64	Bacchus Marsh	3.3 - 21	Maddingley Park	Crowd: 800
1914	Melton	10.14 - 74	Bacchus Marsh	6.7 - 43	Maddingley Park	
1915	Melton	1st	Bacchus Marsh	2nd		Season abandoned in July'15
1916-18						BMDFA In recess > WW1
1919	Melton	5.7 - 37	Bacchus Marsh	3.4 - 22	Maddingley Park	Crowd: "large"
1920	Bacchus Marsh	6.3 - 39	Melton	4.7 - 31	Maddingley Park	£21/14/6
1921	Melton	4.7 - 31	Bacchus Marsh	2.9 - 21	Maddingley Park	
1922	Melton	5.9 - 39	Darley	1.6 - 12	Darley Reserve	
1923	Darley	10.8 - 68	Bacchus Marsh	7.10 - 52	Maddingley Park	Crowd: 1200
1924	Bacchus Marsh	10.17 - 77	Melton	2.5 - 17	Maddingley Park	Crowd: 1200
1925	Bacchus Marsh	4.3 - 27	Rockbank	3.5 - 23	BM Showgrounds	£69/9/-
1926	Darley	7.5 - 47	Rockbank	6.8 - 44	BM Showgrounds	Crowd: "large"
1927	Rockbank	6.7 - 43	Bacchus Marsh	2.5 - 17	BM Showgrounds	Crowd: "fair"
Bacchus Marsh & Werribee District FA
1928	Bacchus Marsh	10.6 - 66	Werribee	9.6 - 60	Chirnside Park, Werribee	
Bacchus Marsh District FA
1929	Melton	9.13 - 68	Toolern Vale Coimadal	6.6 - 42	Maddingley Park	£12
Bacchus Marsh & Melton District FA
1930	Melton	6.11 - 47	Toolern Vale Coimadal	5.8 - 38	Maddingley Park	Crowd: "good"
1931	Melton	7.11 - 53	Rockbank	7.10 - 52	Melton	£12/2/3
1932	Ballan	13.6 - 84	Maddingley	9.15 - 69	Maddingley Park	£40/1/
1933	Bacchus Marsh	10.23 - 83	Maddingley	11.8 - 74	Maddingley Park	£48
1934	Darley	13.15 - 93	Maddingley	7.6 - 48	Maddingley Park	£35
1935	Melton	15.13 - 103	Darley	14.7 - 91	Maddingley Park	£46/7/
1936	Maddingley	10.12 - 72	Rockbank	7.10 - 52	Maddingley Park	£43
1937	Bacchus Marsh	9.10 - 64	Maddingley	6.22 - 58	Maddingley Park	£41
1938	Darley	13.16 - 94	Maddingley	12.12 - 84	Maddingley Park	£33
1939	Darley	15.7 - 97	Ballan	12.10 - 82	Maddingley Park	£35
1940	Bacchus Marsh	14.9 - 93	Darley	10.14 - 74	Maddingley Park	£26
1941	Bacchus Marsh	9.10 - 64	Ballan	7.14 - 56	Maddingley Park	£22/13/6
1942-44						In recess > WW2
1945	Bacchus Marsh	14.8 - 92	Darley	13.12 - 90	Maddingley Park	£35/18/6
1946	Bacchus Marsh	11.7 - 73	Darley	8.20 - 68	Maddingley Park	£42
1947	Darley	8.16 - 64	Ballan	6.11 - 47	Maddingley Park	£55/8/6
1948	Ballan	8.12 - 60	Darley	8.9 - 57	Maddingley Park	
1949	Darley	12.15 - 87	Maddingley	9.13 - 67	Maddingley Park	£123
1950	Darley	19.12 - 126	Lifeguard	14.16 - 100	Maddingley Park	£98
1951	Maddingley	14.13 - 97	Rockbank	8.12 - 60	Maddingley Park	£112
1952	Darley	15.12 - 102	Rockbank	9.8 - 62	Maddingley Park	£140
1953	Rockbank	17.6 - 108	Maddingley	13.5 - 83	Maddingley Park	£149/10/-
1954	Maddingley	17.11 - 113	Darley	12.15 - 87	Maddingley Park	£135
1955	Darley	18.15 - 123	Maddingley	16.12 - 108		
1956	Ballan	12.13 - 85	Darley	11.16 - 82		
1957	Darley	13.19 - 97	Melton	9.21 - 75		
1958	Maddingley	13.10 - 88	Melton	12.14 - 86		
Bacchus Marsh District FL
1959	Darley	15.10 - 100	Ballan	8.19 - 67		
1960	Rockbank	12.18 - 90	Melton	5.11 - 61		
1961	Rockbank	14.17 - 101	Bacchus March	8.13 - 61		
1962	Bacchus Marsh	13.11 - 89	Ballan	10.8 - 68		
1963	Melton	11.15 - 81	Darley	9.11 - 65		
1964	Rockbank	15.19 - 109	Bacchus Marsh	6.17 - 53		
1965	Rockbank	29.21 - 195	Melton	8.8 - 56		
1966	Rockbank	11.9 - 75	Bacchus Marsh	9.14 - 68		
1967	Maddingley	19.12 - 126	Rockbank	17.15 - 115		
1968	Maddingley	14.4 - 88	Ballan	9.9 - 63		
1969	Darley	19.17 - 131	Maddingley	12.12 - 84		
1970	Darley	11.14 - 80	Melton	7.18 - 60		
1971	Darley	14.13 - 97	Melton	11.23 - 89		
1972	Darley					
Bacchus Marsh & Ballarat District FL
1973	Maddingley	20.13 - 133	Bacchus Marsh	20.11 - 131		
1974	Bacchus Marsh					
1975	Sebastopol					
1976	Dunnstown					
1977	Maddingley	15.21 - 111	Sebastopol	12.15 - 85		
1978	Dunnstown					
1979 - Bacchus Marsh & Ballarat District FL merged with Clunes FNL to form the Central Highlands FL
Year	Premiers	Score	Runner Up	Score	Venue	Gate / Comments

=== Reserves ===
	RESERVES - Grand Final Scores					
Year	Premiers	Score	Runner up	Score	Venue	Gate / Comments
Bacchus Marsh & Melton District FA
1947	Ballan	5.7 - 37	Darley	3.8 - 26	Darley	£6
1948						
1961	Maddingley	4.0 - 24	Ballan	2.8 - 20		
1966	Maddingley	7.12 - 54	Bacchus Marsh	4.6 - 30		
1969	Maddingley	8.2 - 50	Melton	6.4 - 40		
1971	Melton	12.12 - 84	Darley	10.7 - 67		

== League Best & Fairests ==
=== Seniors ===
	BM&MDFA - Best & Fairest		
Year	Winner	Club	Votes
B&F Award
1933	Clive Bodycoat &	Darley	4
	Stan Mullane	Ballan	4
1934	Stan Mullane	Ballan	6
1935	Stan Mullane	Ballan	8
1936	Jack Richards	Ballan	3
	Leo Ryan	Melton	3
	Laurie Shea	Maddingley	3
	Jack Skinner	Darley	3
	Jim Whelan	Darley	3
1937	Mick Vallance	Maddingley	4
1938	Jack Skinner &	Darley	6
	Walter Whelan	Maddingley	6
1939	Ron Durham	Bacchus Marsh	7
1940	Wally Russell	Bacchus Marsh	4
1941	Ron Durham	Bacchus Marsh	7
1942-44	BM&MDFA in	recess > WW2	
1945	Fred Robertson	Ballan	14
1946	Gordon Butler	Melton	19
1947	Leon Jongebloed	Melton	19
1948	Frank Lenaghan	Ballan	25
1949	Les Carr	Darley	19
1950	Kevin Spain	Rockbank	28
1951	Kevin Spain	Rockbank	23
1952	Jack Cooper	Maddingley	17
1953	Jack Cooper	Maddingley	26
1954	Les Carr	Darley	18&1/2
1955	Les Carr	Darley	25
1956			
1957			
1958			
1959			
1960			
1961			
1962			
1963			
1964			
1965			
1966			
1967			
1968			
1969			
1970			
1971			
1972			
1973			
1974			
1975			
1976			
1977			
1978			
