= Bacchus Marsh Football Club =

Bacchus Marsh FNC

Names
- Full name: Bacchus Marsh Football & Netball Club
- Nickname: Cobras

2024 season
- After finals: N/A
- Home-and-away season: 9th: 4 wins, 12 losses
- Leading goalkicker: Jake Owen (40)
- Best and fairest: Jake Owen & Tyson Shea

Club details
- Founded: 1881; 144 years ago
- Colours
- Competition: Ballarat Football League
- President: Ian McClure
- Coach: Dennis Armfield
- Premierships: Bacchus Marsh: 14. Maddingley: 8
- Ground: Maddingley Park (The Snake Pit), Cnr Grant & Station Sts, Bacchus Marsh, Victoria (capacity: 7,500)

Uniforms
Home

Other information
- Official website: bmfnc.com.au

Bacchus Marsh Football and Netball Club is an Australian rules football and netball club, located in Bacchus Marsh in Victoria, Australia. The club's various football and netball teams compete in the Ballarat Football League, which is part of the Victorian Country Football League.

The home ground of Bacchus Marsh is Maddingley Park, located to the south of Bacchus Marsh.

== History ==
Bacchus Marsh FC (1881 to 1978)

There was an attempt to form an Australian Rules Football club in Bacchus Marsh in May 1874, but this was delayed until "a greater interest was displayed".

The Bacchus Marsh FC was originally formed April 1881.

In May 1891, Mr. T. Cain was elected as the President.

It appears the club wore red and blue horizontal stripe football jumpers from the early 1900s to the early 1920s.

In 1923, Bacchus Marsh colours were branded as the "Two Blues".

The club initially joined in official competition football in 1911 and then played in the Ballarat Football League in 1929 and 1930.

The Bacchus Marsh "Tigers" initially wore a black guernsey with a yellow strip going diagonally from top left to bottom right from 1929, when they first joined the Ballarat Football League.

- Football Club Timeline
  - 1881 - 1910: Club formed in 1881 & played friendly matches against other local clubs up until 1910.
  - 1911 - ? Football Association
  - 1912 - 1915: Bacchus Marsh District Football Association 1915 BMDFA season abandoned in July.
  - 1916 - 1918: Club in recess due to World War One
  - 1919 - 1927: Bacchus Marsh District Football Association
  - 1928 - Werribee & Bacchus Marsh District Football Association
  - 1929 - 1930: Ballarat Football League 1st 18 played in the BFL.
  - 1929 - Bacchus Marsh District Football Association. BMFC 2nd 18 played in this competition.
  - 1930 & 1931 - Bacchus Marsh & Melton Football Association. BMFC 2nd 18 played in this competition.
  - 1931 - 1932: Geelong & District Football League
  - 1933 - 1941: Bacchus Marsh & Melton Football Association
  - 1942 - 1944: Association & Club in recess due to World War Two. Club active but no official competition football.
  - 1945 - 1958: Bacchus Marsh & Melton Football Association
  - 1959 - 1972: Bacchus Marsh District Football League
  - 1973 - 1978: Bacchus Marsh & Ballarat District Football League
  - 1979 - 1982: Ballarat Football League. Merged with Maddingley FC to form Maddingley-Bacchus Marsh FC
  - 1983 - 2019: Ballarat Football League. The club changed their name to just the Bacchus Marsh FC in 1983.
  - 2020 - League & club in recess due to COVID-19
  - 2021 - 2024: Ballarat Football League

Maddingley FC (1909 to 1978)

The Maddingley Football Club was formed in April 1909, with Mr. W.J. Lindsay elected as President and played in the Bacchuss Marsh FA from 1912 until 1915, but did not reform after World War One, as a club until 1931.

The Maddingley Spiders who wore a black guernsey with a red strip going diagonally from top left to bottom right.

In 1978 Maddingley left the Ballarat-Bacchus Marsh FL and joined the Ballarat Football League. Bacchus Marsh remained in the B-BMFL in 1978 and struggled because the club was practically insolvent. At the end of the 1978 season, a deal was done and the two clubs merged.

Maddingley-Bacchus Marsh FC (1979 to 1982)

The two clubs officially merged in 1979 to form Maddingley-Bacchus Marsh FC who decided to wear a black guernsey with two "v" shape strips, one red, one yellow starting at the top left and finishing on the top right.

Bacchus Marsh FC (1983 to present day)

The Maddingley-Bacchus Marsh FC changed their name to just the Bacchus Marsh FC in 1983.

There have been a few great footballers to go through the district from both Bacchus Marsh and Maddingley including, Fred Wooller, Sandy Talbot, Frank Pomeroy, Liam Duggan and Bugsy.

Bacchus Marsh FC colours: early 1900's

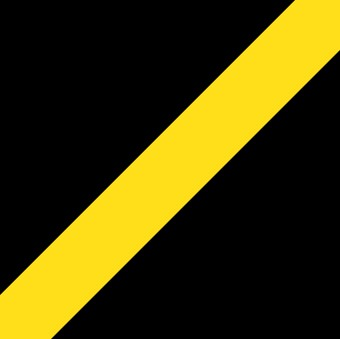
Bacchus Marsh FC Colours: 1929 - 78

Maddingley FC Colours

== Football Premierships ==
Seniors
Bacchus Marsh FC

- Bacchus Marsh District Football Association
  - 1912 - Bacchus Marsh: 8.12 - 60 defeated Melton: 5.6 - 36
  - 1920 - Bacchus Marsh: 6.3 - 39 d Melton: 4.7 - 31
  - 1924 - Bacchus Marsh: 10.17 - 77 d Melton: 2.5 - 17
  - 1925 - Bacchus Marsh: 4.3 - 27 d Rockbank: 3.5 - 23
- Werribee & Bacchus Marsh District Football Association
  - 1928 - Bacchus Marsh: 10.6 - 66 d Werribee: 9.6 - 60
- Bacchus Marsh & Melton District Football Association
  - 1933 - Bacchus Marsh: 10.23 - 83 d Maddingley: 11.8 - 74
  - 1937 - Bacchus Marsh: 9.10 - 64 d Maddingley: 6.22 - 58
  - 1940 - Bacchus Marsh: 14.9 - 93 d Darley: 10.14 - 74
  - 1941 - Bacchus Marsh: 9.10 - 64 d Ballan: 7.14 - 56
  - 1945 - Bacchus Marsh: 14.8 - 92 d Darley: 13.12 - 90
  - 1946 - Bacchus Marsh: 11.7 - 73 d Darley: 8.20 - 68
- Bacchus Marsh District Football League
  - 1962 - Bacchus Marsh: 13.11 - 89 d Ballan: 10.8 - 68
  - 1974 - Bacchus Marsh: d
- Ballarat Football League
  - 2016 - Bacchus Marsh: 13.21 - 99 d Sunbury: 5.14 - 44

Maddingley FC

- Bacchus Marsh & Melton District Football Association
  - 1936 - Maddingley: 10.12 - 72 d Rockbank: 7.10 - 52
  - 1951 - Maddingley: 14.13 - 97 d Rockbank: 8.12 - 60
  - 1954 - Maddingley: 17.11 - 113 d Darley: 12.15 - 85
  - 1958 - Maddingley: 13.10 88 d Melton: 12.14 - 86
- Bacchus Marsh District Football League
  - 1967 - Maddingley: 19.12 - 126 d Rockbank: 17.15 - 115
  - 1968 - Maddingley: 14.4 - 88 d Ballan: 9.9 - 63
- Ballarat-Bacchus Marsh Football League
  - 1973 - Maddingley: 20.13 - 133 d Bacchus Marsh: 20.11 - 131
  - 1977 - Maddingley: 15.21 - 111 d Sebastopol: 12.15 - 85

Reserves
Bacchus Marsh FC

- Bacchus Marsh District Football League
  - 1967 - Bacchus Marsh: 10.6 - Ballan: 7.9 - 51

Maddingley FC

- Bacchus Marsh District Football League
  - 1961 - Maddingley:
  - 1966 - Maddingley:
  - 1969 - Maddingley:

== Football Runner Up ==
Seniors
Bacchus Marsh FC

- Bacchus Marsh District Football Association
  - 1913 - Melton: 8.16 - 64 d Bacchus Marsh: 3.3 - 21
  - 1914 - Melton: 10.14 - 74 d Bacchus Marsh: 6.7 - 43
  - 1919 - Melton: 5.7 - 37 d Bacchus Marsh: 3.4 - 22
  - 1921 - Melton: 4.7 - 31 d Bacchus Marsh: 2.9 - 21
  - 1923
  - 1927
- Geelong & District Football League
  - 1931 - Geelong West: 8.13 - 61 d Bacchus Marsh: 6.10 - 46
- Bacchus Marsh District Football League
  - 1961, 1964, 1966
- Bacchus Marsh & Ballarat Football League
  - 1973
- Ballarat Football League
  - 2017

Seniors
Maddingley FC

- Bacchus Marsh & Melton Football Association
  - 1932, 1933, 1934, 1937, 1938, 1949, 1953, 1955
- Bacchus Marsh District Football League
  - 1969

== League Best & Fairest winners ==
Senior Football

- Bacchus Marsh & Melton District Football Association
  - 1936 - Laurie Shea: Maddingley
  - 1937 - Mick Vallence: Maddingley
  - 1938 - Walter Wehlan: Maddingley
  - 1939 - Ron Durham: Bacchus Marsh
  - 1940 - Wally Russell: Bacchus Marsh
  - 1941 - Ron Durham: Bacchus Marsh
  - 1952 - Jack Cooper: Maddingley
  - 1953 - Jack Cooper: Maddingley
- Ballarat Football League - Henderson Medal
  - 1997 - Wayne Cracknell
  - 2018 - Daniel Burton

== League Goal Kicking Award Winners ==
Senior Football

- Bacchus Marsh & Melton Football Association
  - 1945 - T Hine (40)
- Ballarat Football League - Tony Lockett Medal (awarded from 1988 onwards)
  - 1987 - Malcom Scott (69 goals)
  - 1990 - Malcom Scott (79)
  - 1991 - R.Maguire (82)
  - 1998 - Brendan Hehir (74)
  - 2000 - Chris Stuldreier (93)
  - 2001 - Chris Stuldreier (88)

== VFL / AFL players ==
The following footballers played with either Bacchus Marsh FNC or Maddingley FNC, prior to playing senior football in the VFL/AFL, and / or drafted, with the year indicating their VFL/AFL debut.

- 1926 - Harry Vallence - Carlton
- 1926 - Danny Wheelahan - South Melbourne
- 1930 - Martin Wheelahan - South Melbourne
- 1932 - Keith Shea - Carlton and Hawthorn
- 1934 - David Wilkie - Essendon
- 1936 - Eddie Shea - Hawthorn
- 1938 - Les Watkins - Carlton
- 1939 - Jack Skinner - Carlton
- 1942 - Ray Bamford - North Melbourne
- 1942 - Ollie Grieve - Carlton
- 1942 - Wally Russell - Richmond
- 1943 - Ron Durham - Richmond
- 1945 - Jack Shea - Hawthorn
- 1947 - Les Carr - Carlton
- 1948 - Alan Bulman - Footscray
- 1956 - Fred Wooller - Geelong
- 1964 - Wayne Closter - Geelong
- 1970 - Sandy Talbot - Essendon
- 2009 - Nick Suban - Fremantle
- 2015 - Liam Duggan - West Coast
- 2025 - Sam Lalor - Richmond
- 2025 - Lucca Grego - West Coast

The following footballers played senior VFL / AFL football prior to playing and / or coaching with Bacchus Marsh FNC with the year indicating their first season at BMFNC.

- 1931 - Don Watson - North Melbourne
- 1932 - Pat Murphy - Hawthorn
- 1940 - Monty Brown - Carlton
- 1949 - Ken Dyer - Hawthorn
- 1970 - Frank Pomeroy - Geelong
- 1974 - Graham Middleton - Essendon
- 1987 - Malcom Scott - St Kilda
- 2007 - Dion Miles - North Melbourne
- 2012 - Doug Hawkins - Footscray
- 2013 - Brendan Fevola - Carlton
- 2016 - Damian Cupido - Essendon

== Netball ==
As of 2024, the club's netball section fields a number of sides in the Ballarat Football League's netball competitions -

- A. Grade, B. Grade, C. Grade, D. Grade & E. Grade
- 19 & Under
- 17 & Under Seniors & 17 & Under Reserves
- 15 & Under Seniors & 15 & Under Reserves
- 13 & Under Seniors & 13 & Under Reserves
- 11 & Under Seniors & 11 & Under Reserves
- 9 & Under

== Bacchus Marsh Football Association ==
The Bacchus Marsh Football Association was formed in 1912 from the following clubs - Bacchus Marsh, Deer Park, Maddingley, Melton and Parwan.

The Bacchus Marsh Football Association initially went into recess in 1928 due to Ballan pulling out, which left only four clubs, then Bacchus Marsh and Rockbank FC's joined the Werribee District Football Association, which then changed its name to the Bacchus Marsh & Werribee District Football Association.

The Bacchus Marsh District Football Association was reformed in April 1929, at their annual meeting.

In 1930, the BMDFA became the Bacchus Marsh & Melton District Football Association.

The BM&MDFA was revived in 1945, after being in recess since 1942 due to World War Two, the competition consisted of five teams, including one new club, the 2nd Australian Army Medical Corps (AAMC) Training Battalion Football Club.

In 1949, a 20 year old Lifeguard FC player received a heavy knock to the head and later died at a local Doctor's surgery.

In 1959, the BMMDFA changed their name to the Bacchus Marsh Football League.

In 1979, the Ballarat & Bacchus Marsh District FL merged with the Clunes FL to form the Central Highlands Football League.

=== Football Premiers ===
Seniors

	SENIORS - Grand Final Scores					
Year	Premiers	Score	Runner up	Score	Venue	Gate / Comments
Bacchus Marsh District FA
1912	Bacchus Marsh	8.12 - 60	Melton	5.6 - 36	Maddingley Park	£17/12/13
1913	Melton	6.16 - 64	Bacchus Marsh	3.3 - 21	Maddingley Park	Crowd: 800
1914	Melton	10.14 - 74	Bacchus Marsh	6.7 - 43	Maddingley Park	
1915	Melton	1st	Bacchus Marsh	2nd		Season abandoned in July'15
1916-18						BMDFA In recess > WW1
1919	Melton	5.7 - 37	Bacchus Marsh	3.4 - 22	Maddingley Park	Crowd: "large"
1920	Bacchus Marsh	6.3 - 39	Melton	4.7 - 31	Maddingley Park	£21/14/6
1921	Melton	4.7 - 31	Bacchus Marsh	2.9 - 21	Maddingley Park	
1922	Melton	5.9 - 39	Darley	1.6 - 12	Darley Reserve	
1923	Darley	10.8 - 68	Bacchus Marsh	7.10 - 52	Maddingley Park	Crowd: 1200
1924	Bacchus Marsh	10.17 - 77	Melton	2.5 - 17	Maddingley Park	Crowd: 1200
1925	Bacchus Marsh	4.3 - 27	Rockbank	3.5 - 23	BM Showgrounds	£69/9/-
1926	Darley	7.5 - 47	Rockbank	6.8 - 44	BM Showgrounds	Crowd: "large"
1927	Rockbank	6.7 - 43	Bacchus Marsh	2.5 - 17	BM Showgrounds	Crowd: "fair"
Bacchus Marsh & Werribee District FA
1928	Bacchus Marsh	10.6 - 66	Werribee	9.6 - 60	Chirnside Park, Werribee	
Bacchus Marsh District FA
1929	Melton	9.13 - 68	Toolern Vale Coimadal	6.6 - 42	Maddingley Park	£12
Bacchus Marsh & Melton District FA
1930	Melton	6.11 - 47	Toolern Vale Coimadal	5.8 - 38	Maddingley Park	Crowd: "good"
1931	Melton	7.11 - 53	Rockbank	7.10 - 52	Melton	£12/2/3
1932	Ballan	13.6 - 84	Maddingley	9.15 - 69	Maddingley Park	£40/1/
1933	Bacchus Marsh	10.23 - 83	Maddingley	11.8 - 74	Maddingley Park	£48
1934	Darley	13.15 - 93	Maddingley	7.6 - 48	Maddingley Park	£35
1935	Melton	15.13 - 103	Darley	14.7 - 91	Maddingley Park	£46/7/
1936	Maddingley	10.12 - 72	Rockbank	7.10 - 52	Maddingley Park	£43
1937	Bacchus Marsh	9.10 - 64	Maddingley	6.22 - 58	Maddingley Park	£41
1938	Darley	13.16 - 94	Maddingley	12.12 - 84	Maddingley Park	£33
1939	Darley	15.7 - 97	Ballan	12.10 - 82	Maddingley Park	£35
1940	Bacchus Marsh	14.9 - 93	Darley	10.14 - 74	Maddingley Park	£26
1941	Bacchus Marsh	9.10 - 64	Ballan	7.14 - 56	Maddingley Park	£22/13/6
1942-44						In recess > WW2
1945	Bacchus Marsh	14.8 - 92	Darley	13.12 - 90	Maddingley Park	£35/18/6
1946	Bacchus Marsh	11.7 - 73	Darley	8.20 - 68	Maddingley Park	£42
1947	Darley	8.16 - 64	Ballan	6.11 - 47	Maddingley Park	£55/8/6
1948	Ballan	8.12 - 60	Darley	8.9 - 57	Maddingley Park	
1949	Darley	12.15 - 87	Maddingley	9.13 - 67	Maddingley Park	£123
1950	Darley	19.12 - 126	Lifeguard	14.16 - 100	Maddingley Park	£98
1951	Maddingley	14.13 - 97	Rockbank	8.12 - 60	Maddingley Park	£112
1952	Darley	15.12 - 102	Rockbank	9.8 - 62	Maddingley Park	£140
1953	Rockbank	17.6 - 108	Maddingley	13.5 - 83	Maddingley Park	£149/10/-
1954	Maddingley	17.11 - 113	Darley	12.15 - 87	Maddingley Park	£135
1955	Darley	18.15 - 123	Maddingley	16.12 - 108		
1956	Ballan	12.13 - 85	Darley	11.16 - 82		
1957	Darley	13.19 - 97	Melton	9.21 - 75		
1958	Maddingley	13.10 - 88	Melton	12.14 - 86		
Bacchus Marsh District FL
1959	Darley	15.10 - 100	Ballan	8.19 - 67		
1960	Rockbank	12.18 - 90	Melton	5.11 - 61		
1961	Rockbank	14.17 - 101	Bacchus March	8.13 - 61		
1962	Bacchus Marsh	13.11 - 89	Ballan	10.8 - 68		
1963	Melton	11.15 - 81	Darley	9.11 - 65		
1964	Rockbank	15.19 - 109	Bacchus Marsh	6.17 - 53		
1965	Rockbank	29.21 - 195	Melton	8.8 - 56		
1966	Rockbank	11.9 - 75	Bacchus Marsh	9.14 - 68		
1967	Maddingley	19.12 - 126	Rockbank	17.15 - 115		
1968	Maddingley	14.4 - 88	Ballan	9.9 - 63		
1969	Darley	19.17 - 131	Maddingley	12.12 - 84		
1970	Darley	11.14 - 80	Melton	7.18 - 60		
1971	Darley	14.13 - 97	Melton	11.23 - 89		
1972	Darley					
Bacchus Marsh & Ballarat District FL
1973	Maddingley	20.13 - 133	Bacchus Marsh	20.11 - 131		
1974	Bacchus Marsh					
1975	Sebastopol					
1976	Dunnstown					
1977	Maddingley	15.21 - 111	Sebastopol	12.15 - 85		
1978	Dunnstown					
1979 - Bacchus Marsh & Ballarat District FL merged with Clunes FNL to form the Central Highlands FL
Year	Premiers	Score	Runner Up	Score	Venue	Gate / Comments

Reserves

	RESERVES - Grand Final Scores					
Year	Premiers	Score	Runner up	Score	Venue	Gate / Comments
Bacchus Marsh & Melton District FA
1947	Ballan	5.7 - 37	Darley	3.8 - 26	Darley	£6
1948						
1961	Maddingley	4.0 - 24	Ballan	2.8 - 20		
1966	Maddingley	7.12 - 54	Bacchus Marsh	4.6 - 30		
1969	Maddingley	8.2 - 50	Melton	6.4 - 40		
1971	Melton	12.12 - 84	Darley	10.7 - 67		

=== League Best & Fairest ===
Seniors

	BM&MDFA - Best & Fairest		
Year	Winner	Club	Votes
B&F Award
1933	Clive Bodycoat &	Darley	4
	Stan Mullane	Ballan	4
1934	Stan Mullane	Ballan	6
1935	Stan Mullane	Ballan	8
1936	Jack Richards	Ballan	3
	Leo Ryan	Melton	3
	Laurie Shea	Maddingley	3
	Jack Skinner	Darley	3
	Jim Whelan	Darley	3
1937	Mick Vallance	Maddingley	4
1938	Jack Skinner &	Darley	6
	Walter Whelan	Maddingley	6
1939	Ron Durham	Bacchus Marsh	7
1940	Wally Russell	Bacchus Marsh	4
1941	Ron Durham	Bacchus Marsh	7
1942-44	BM&MDFA in	recess > WW2	
1945	Fred Robertson	Ballan	14
1946	Gordon Butler	Melton	19
1947	Leon Jongebloed	Melton	19
1948	Frank Lenaghan	Ballan	25
1949	Les Carr	Darley	19
1950	Kevin Spain	Rockbank	28
1951	Kevin Spain	Rockbank	23
1952	Jack Cooper	Maddingley	17
1953	Jack Cooper	Maddingley	26
1954	Les Carr	Darley	18&1/2
1955	Les Carr	Darley	25
1956			
1957			
1958			
1959			
1960			
1961			
1962			
1963			
1964			
1965			
1966			
1967			
1968			
1969			
1970			
1971			
1972			
1973			
1974			
1975			
1976			
1977			
1978			

=== Football Teams ===
Seniors

	BMFA - Competition Teams	
Team	Years in competition	Comments / Fate
Bacchus Marsh	1912-15, 1919-28, 1933-41, 1945-78	Joined Ballarat FL in 1929. Merged with Maddingley FC in 1979.
Bacchus Marsh 2nds	1929-31	In recess after 1931
Ballan	1919-27, 1932-41, 1945-78	Joined the Central Highlands FL in 1979
Balliang	1914	Went into recess, then reformed in 1929 & merged with Rowsley FC.
Balliang - Rowsley	1929-32, 1935-39, 1947-48,	Went into recess after in '33. Went into recess in '40.
Buninyong	1973-78	Joined the Central Highlands FL in 1979
Darley	1919-27, 1929, 1931-41, 1945-78	Joined the Central Highlands FL in 1979
Deer Park	1912, 1923-24	Joined the Werribee & Lara FA in 1925.
Dunnstown	1973-78	Joined the Central Highlands FL in 1979
Exford Star	1915	Went into recess in 1916 due to WW1
Gordon	1924-25, 1934-35, 1973-78	Joined the Central Highlands FL in 1979
Irish National Foresters	1928,	Joined the Werribee Shire District FA in '29
Laverton	1928	Joined the Werribee Shire District FA in '29
Lifeguard Milk Factory	1948-51,	Disbanded in March 1952
Maddingley	1912-15, 1931-41, 1946-77	Went into recess after 1915 & 1941. Joined the Ballarat FL in 1978
Melton	1912-15, 1919-27, 1929-40, 1945-72	Went into recess in '41. Joined the Riddell DFL in 1973
Meredith	1973-75	Joined the Geelong & DFL in 1976. Folded in 1981.
Metro Farm	1928	Joined the Werribee Shire District FA in '29
Parwan	1912-14	Went into recess in 1915 due to WW1
Rockbank	1920-28, 1931-36, 1949-72	Went into recess after '36. In recess between 1973-91. Joined the Footscray & DFL in '92
2nd AAMC Battalion	1945	Folded after one season in the BM&MDFA.
Sebastopol	1973-77	Joined Ballarat FL in 1978
Toolern Vale-Coimadal	1929-30	Club folded prior to the BMDFA annual meeting in 1931
Werribee	1928	Joined the Geelong & DFL in '29

== Book ==
- History of Football in the Ballarat District by John Stoward - ISBN 978-0-9805929-0-0
