= David Wilkie =

David Wilkie may refer to:

- David Wilkie (artist) (1785–1841), Scottish painter
- David Wilkie (surgeon) (1882–1938), British surgeon, scientist and philanthropist
- David Wilkie (footballer) (1914–2011), Australian rules footballer
- David Wilkie (swimmer) (1954–2024), Scottish swimmer
- David Wilkie (ice hockey) (born 1974), American ice hockey player
- David Wilkie (taxicab driver) (1949–1984), Welsh taxi driver killed during the UK miners' strike of 1984–85
- David Lloyd Wilkie or Adam Purple (1930–2015), American activist and guerrilla gardener born as David Lloyd Wilkie
