= Lippiatt =

Lippiatt is a surname. Notable people with the surname include:

- Harry Lippiatt (1917–1997), Australian rules footballer
- Ken Lippiatt (1920–2013), Australian rules footballer
- Kevin Lippiatt (born c. 1962/1963), plaintiff in Lippiatt v Electoral Registration Officer, Penwith District Council

== See also ==
- Lippitt
