= Sebastopol Football Netball Club =

Australian football and rugby club in Ballarat, Victoria, Australia

Sebastopol

Names
- Full name: Sebastopol Football Netball Club
- Nickname(s): Burras

Club details
- Founded: 1893; 132 years ago
- Colours
- Competition: Ballarat FL
- President: Darren Hammill, Chenay Wilkinson
- Coach: Luke Kiel, Michael Columbro
- Captain(s): Tony Lockyer
- Premierships: (13): 1920, 1929, 1936, 1937, 1939, 1950, 1951, 1952, 1953, 1965, 1967, 1969, 1975
- Ground(s): Marty Busch Oval, Sebastopol

Uniforms
Home

Other information
- Official website: sebasfnc.com.au

The Sebastopol Football Netball Club, nicknamed the Burras, is an Australian rules football and netball club based in the southern suburb of Sebastopol in Ballarat, Victoria. The football team currently competes in the Ballarat Football Netball League, having debuted there in 1978.

== History ==
The club was originally founded in 1893, and competed in the Ballarat Football Association wearing the colours of red and white before changing to blue and white in 1894. The club was a founding member of the competition in 1893 finishing in fourth place, and took until 1920 to win its inaugural premiership. In 1922 the club adopted the colours of blue and gold that prevail to the present day.

After winning its second premiership in 1929, Sebastopol moved to the Ballarat and District Football League and won two consecutive premierships (1936 and 1937) before joining the Ballarat Football League in 1938. The club played off in the grand final in its first season and were defeated by South Ballarat, but then in 1939 it transferred to the Clunes Football Association, winning the premiership before returning to the BFL in 1940. Consequent to this World War Two affected player numbers causing Sebastopol to form a temporary merger with South Ballarat before the BFL went into recess.

Sebastopol returned in its pre-war form in 1946 rejoining the Clunes FA. In 1947 it moved back to the BFL in its B Grade competition, and won premierships from 1950 to 1953. In 1959 the B Grade competition separated from the BFL to form the Ballarat District Football League and Sebastopol won premierships in this competition in 1965, 1967 and 1969. The BDFL then merged in 1973 with the Bacchus Marsh Football League and Sebastopol won the premiership in this competition in 1975. This would be the club's last premiership to date.

Sebastopol rejoined the BFL in 1978 and has made four grand finals, losing them to North Ballarat in 1985, Melton in 2000 and 2022, and East Point in 2019.

Following a successful 2022, the club announced the departure of senior coach Michael Searle, citing work commitments. In late 2022, Sebastopol then announced both Luke Kiel and Michael Columbro as 2023 senior coaches.

The 2023 season was another good season for the Burra. The side would finish third with 12 wins, four losses, however, were stunned by East Point Football Club in the opening round of the finals. The sixth-placed side were able to eliminate both 2022 grand finalists Sebastopol and Melton Football Club. The Burra were cruelled by injuries across the season and this included an injury to coach Kiel on the eve of finals. While the side finished third and in good position, the club announced that both senior coaches would stand down but remain involved at the club in 2024.

== Netball ==
Sebastopol won the 1993 Ballarat Football League Netball Premiership, led by club-icon Maree Hutt.

On October 26, 2012, Sebastopol announced the signing of Central Highlands Football League club Dunnstown's premiership coach Georgia Cann. Club-coach Cann was joined by Narelle Perkins to co-coach the club in 2022.

The 2022 season was Ballarat Football League Netball's first full season since 2019, due to COVID-19 interruptions in 2020 and 2021. The Burras returned to court against Darley to go down 42–38 at Marty Busch Oval on 9 April 2022. After a string of narrow losses, Sebastopol stunned the competition by drawing with then-competition leaders Melton South 50-all. Their first win of the season came in an emphatic 63–42 victory over Ballarat. The Burras finished seventh with four wins. The Best and Fairest was won by Adut Manyiel with young gun Libby Hutt finishing second. Thalia Watts secured the Coaches Award. Adut Manyiel was part of the Victorian Netball League Under 19s Grand Final win with City West Falcons, starring in the shooting circle.

On September 22, 2022, the Burras announced that Perkins would become head coach from 2023.

The 2023 season was successful for the Burra - returning to finals for the first time since the end of the COVID-19 pandemic. Burra finished in fourth with 12 wins and four losses. The season opened with a 72–14 victory over Bacchus Marsh Football Club which kicked off a five-game winning streak to start the season. The side's first loss came in Round 7 when eventual premiers North Ballarat Football Club beat Burra 60–47. Burra finished the year with three consecutive wins heading into finals, including a 45–32 victory over Redan. In the first week of the finals, after an intense first three quarters, Sebastopol fell to Redan 46-38 ending the club's season.

== Home ground ==
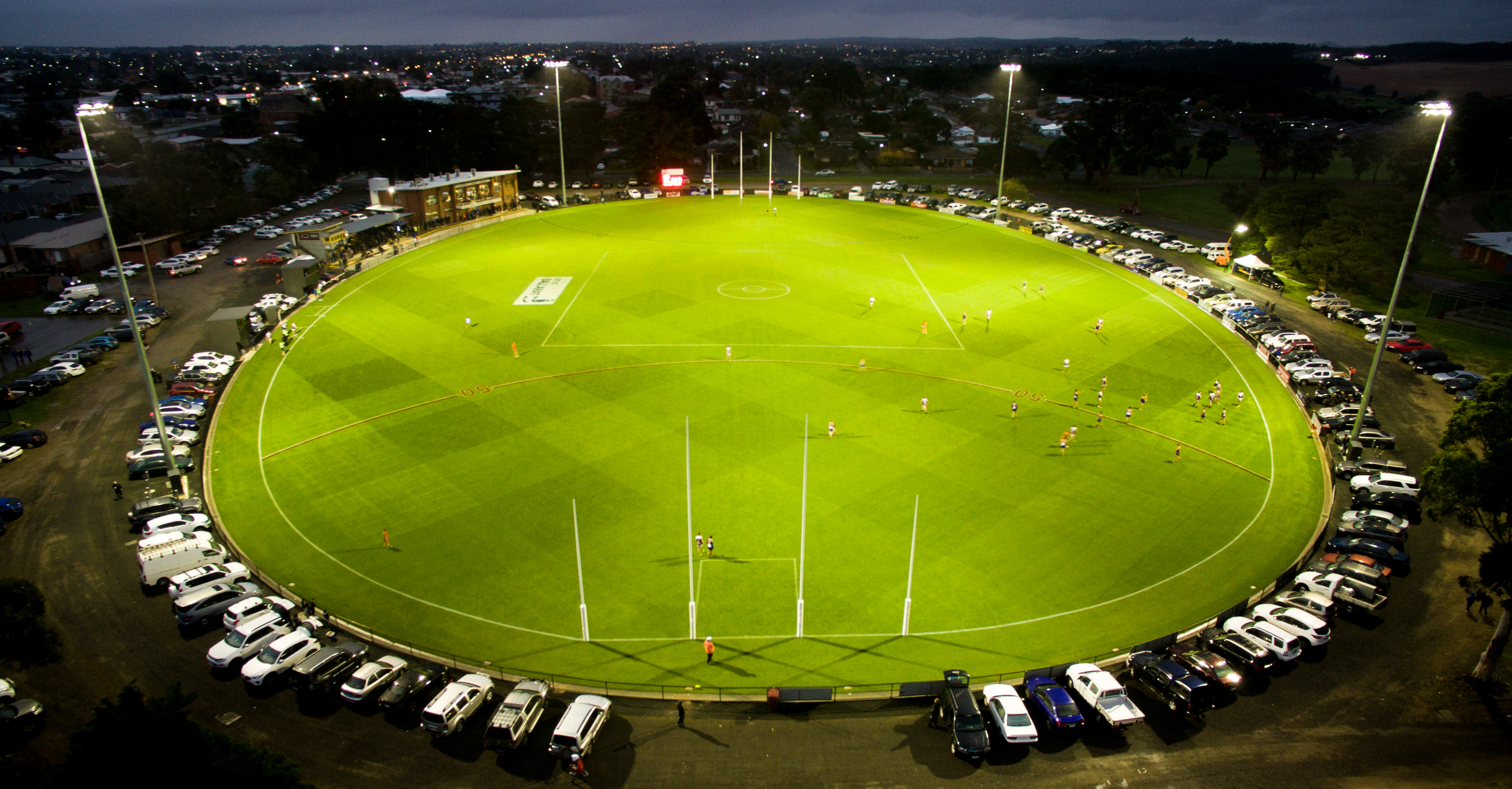
Marty Busch Reserve - Opening of redeveloped ground, 2017

Sebastopol play their home matches at Marty Busch Reserve, Sebastopol.

In the 2019 off-season, Sebastopol secured a major sponsorship deal with Sovereign Financial Group. The home ground was named the Sovereign Financial Group Oval for seasons 2020 and 2021.

== Club song ==
Out we come,

Out we come,

Out we come to play

Just for recreation sake

To pass the time away

Lots of fun, lots of fun

Enjoy yourself today

The Burra boys are on the ball

When they come out to play!

Soooo, Join in the chorus

And sing it one and all

Join in the chorus

The Burras on the ball

Good old Burra

They're champions you'll agree

The Burra boys are premiers

Just you wait & see!!

== VFL/AFL/AFLW/VNL/Super Netball players ==
- Daryl Peoples - Fitzroy
- Wayne Johnston - Carlton
- Malcolm Scott (Australian footballer) - St Kilda and Sydney
- Mick McGuane - Collingwood and Carlton
- Steven Venner - North Melbourne
- Matt Austin - Brisbane Lions
- Brett Goodes - Western Bulldogs
- Rowan Marshall- St Kilda
- Kaitlyn Ashmore - Brisbane and North Melbourne
- Nicole Hildebrand - Brisbane and Collingwood
- Adut Manyiel - Victoria Netball League City West Falcons

== Bibliography ==
- History of Football in the Ballarat District by John Stoward - ISBN 978-0-9805929-0-0
- A History of the Sebastopol Football Netball Club 1879-2022
