= Glenmore, Victoria =

Glenmore
- Town
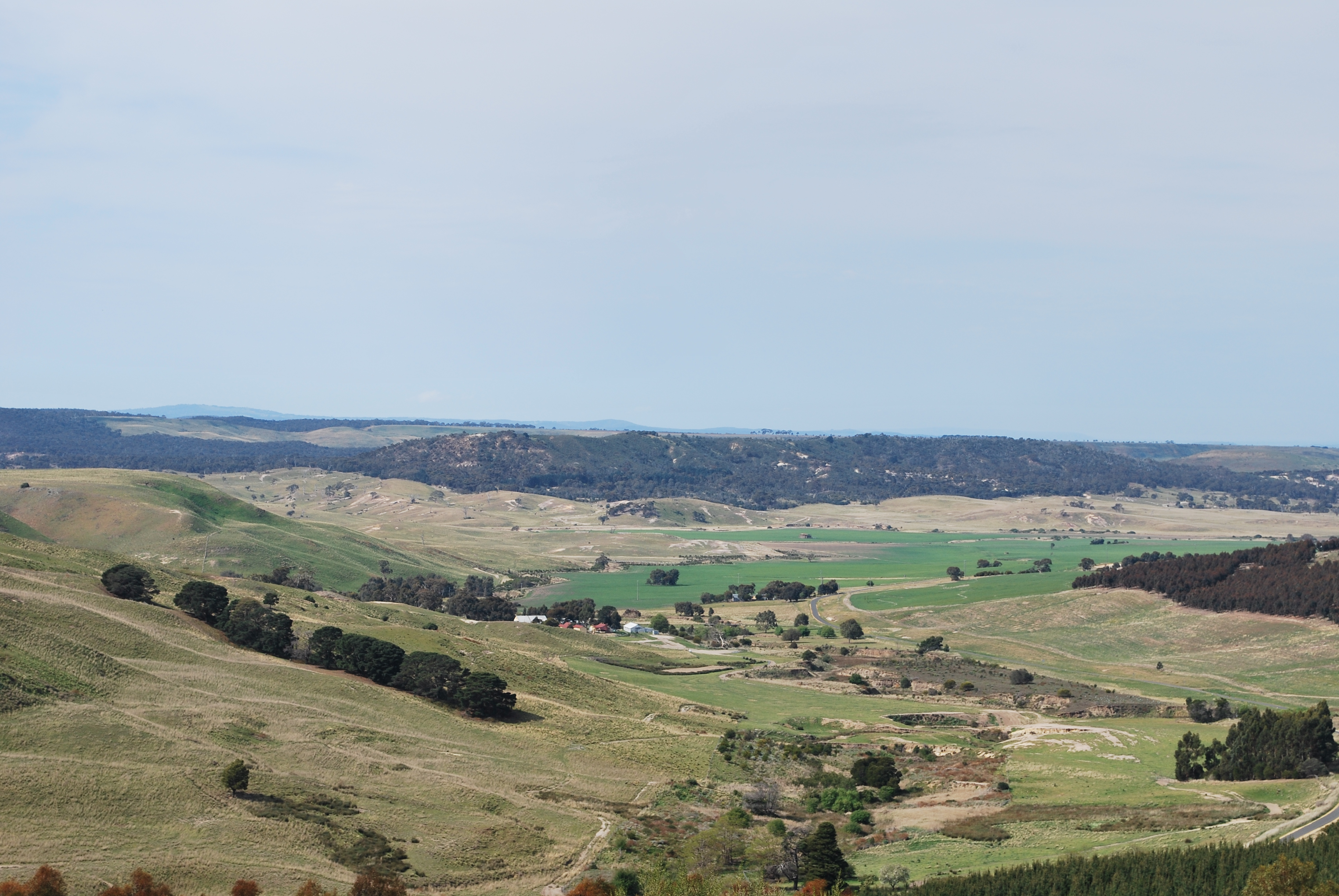
- Parwan Creek valley at Glenmore

- Coordinates: 37°42′42″S 144°18′44″E
- Country: Australia
- State: Victoria
- LGA: Shire of Moorabool
- Location: 112 km (70 mi) WNW of Melbourne; 19 km (12 mi) SW of Bacchus Marsh

Government
  - State electorate: Eureka
  - Federal division: Hawke

Population
  - Total: 63 (2016 census)
- Postcode: 3340
Localities around Glenmore
Fiskville	Ingliston	Rowsley
Mount Wallace	Glenmore	Rowsley
Balliang	Balliang	Balliang

Glenmore is a locality in central Victoria, Australia. The locality is in the Shire of Moorabool, 70 kilometres (43 mi) west of the state capital, Melbourne.

At the 2016 census, Glenmore had a population of 63.
