= Memorial Avenue =

Memorial Avenue may refer to:

- Anzac Memorial Avenue, Australia
- Next of Kin Memorial Avenue, Canada
- King George V Memorial Avenue, Australia
- Pioneer Women's Memorial Avenue, Australia
