= Jack Skinner =

Jack Skinner may refer to:

- Jack Skinner (New Zealand footballer) (1915–2002), football (soccer) player who represented New Zealand
- Jack Skinner (Australian footballer) (born 1917), former Australian rules footballer
- Jack Skinner (Kerry Gaelic footballer), scored 1–2 in the 1909 All-Ireland Senior Football Championship final
- Jack Skinner (Tipperary Gaelic footballer), played in the 1918 All-Ireland Senior Football Championship final
- Jack Skinner (British Scientist) (born 1994), planetary scientist known for research on atmospheric and oceanic dynamics across Earth and exoplanets
