= Eddie Shea =

Australian rules footballer, born 1915

Personal information
- Full name: Edmond Shea
- Born: 11 June 1915; Bacchus Marsh, Victoria
- Died: 19 November 1978 (aged 63); Gisborne, Victoria
- Original team: Bacchus Marsh
- Height: 178 cm (5 ft 10 in)
- Weight: 81 kg (179 lb)

Playing career^{1}
Years	Club	Games (Goals)
1936–37	Hawthorn	12 (0)
- ^{1} Playing statistics correct to the end of 1937.

Eddie Shea (11 June 1915 – 19 November 1978) was an Australian rules footballer who played with Hawthorn in the Victorian Football League (VFL).
