= Malcolm Scott (Australian footballer) =

Australian rules footballer

Personal information
- Full name: Malcolm Jeffrey Scott
- Born: 11 April 1958
- Died: 4 November 2017 (aged 59)
- Original team: North Ballarat
- Height: 188 cm (6 ft 2 in)
- Weight: 76 kg (168 lb)
- Position: Full Forward

Playing career^{1}
Years	Club	Games (Goals)
1979–80	St Kilda	10 (26)
1985	Sydney	1 (1)
Total		11 (27)
- ^{1} Playing statistics correct to the end of 1985.

Malcolm Jeffrey Scott (11 April 1958 – 4 November 2017) was an Australian rules footballer who played with St Kilda and Sydney in the Victorian Football League (VFL).

Scott’s Ballarat Football League achievements included more than 100 junior and more than 100 senior games with North Ballarat FC and three senior premierships in 1978, 1979 and 1982. He also played more than 50 senior games with Sebastopol FC and more than 100 senior games with Bacchus Marsh FC. Scott was the Tony Lockett Medalist for most goals kicked in a BFL season in 1987 and 1990.

Malcolm Scott also played for Learmonth in the Central Highlands FL and Avoca in the Lexton FL.

Malcolm Scott was also a long serving member of the Australian Federal Police and Victoria Police. He committed suicide in November 2017, aged 59.
