= Pat Murphy (Australian footballer, born 1906) =

Australian rules footballer, born 1906

Pat "Spud" Murphy

Personal information
- Full name: Patrick Clarence Murphy
- Born: 31 August 1906; Malvern, Victoria
- Died: 11 August 1973 (aged 66); Blackburn, Victoria
- Original team: St Kilda CBC
- Height: 178 cm (5 ft 10 in)
- Weight: 81 kg (179 lb)

Playing career^{1}
Years	Club	Games (Goals)
1927–28	Hawthorn	7 (1)
- ^{1} Playing statistics correct to the end of 1928.

Patrick Clarence Murphy (31 August 1906 – 11 August 1973) was an Australian rules footballer who played with Hawthorn in the Victorian Football League (VFL).

Murphy was captain-coach of Bacchus Marsh in 1932.

== Military service ==
Murphy later served in the Australian Army during World War II.

== Death ==
He died at his residence in Blackburn, Victoria on 11 August 1973.
