= Ron Durham =

Australian rules footballer

Personal information
- Full name: Ronald James Durham
- Born: 11 June 1921; Bacchus Marsh, Victoria
- Died: 25 June 1961 (aged 40); Bacchus Marsh, Victoria
- Original teams: Ivanhoe Grammar, Bacchus Marsh
- Height: 183 cm (6 ft 0 in)
- Weight: 85.5 kg (188 lb)

Playing career^{1}
Years	Club	Games (Goals)
1943–1948	Richmond	59 (0)
- ^{1} Playing statistics correct to the end of 1948.

Career highlights
- Richmond Premiership Player 1943; Richmond Best and Fairest 1943

Ronald James Durham (11 June 1921 – 25 June 1961) was an Australian rules footballer who was recruited from Bacchus Marsh after winning the 1939 and 1941 Bacchus Marsh & Melton Football Association best and fairest award, the C C Jones Medal. Durham was also runner up in the 1938 and 1940 Bacchus Marsh & Melton Football Association best and fairest award, the C C Jones Medal too.

Durham played in the VFL in between 1943 and 1944 and then from 1946 to 1948 for the Richmond Football Club.

He played at full back in Richmond's 1943 VFL premiership and also won the club's best and fairest in 1943 (in his first year in the VFL) He missed the 1944 VFL finals series through injury, but did play in the 1947 VFL finals series.

Durham did not play VFL football between Rd.7, 1944 to Rd.6, 1946 due to constant injuries. His career was eventually cut short in 1949 by a serious knee injury.

== Death ==
Ron Durham died while using an electric drill to install a heating plant in a greenhouse at his property in Bacchus Marsh. He received an electric shock and was found unconscious. He was taken to the local hospital but was unresponsive. Doctors decided to transfer him to the larger Footscray District Hospital. He died in an ambulance whilst being transferred.
