= Rowsley, Victoria =

Rowsley Victoria
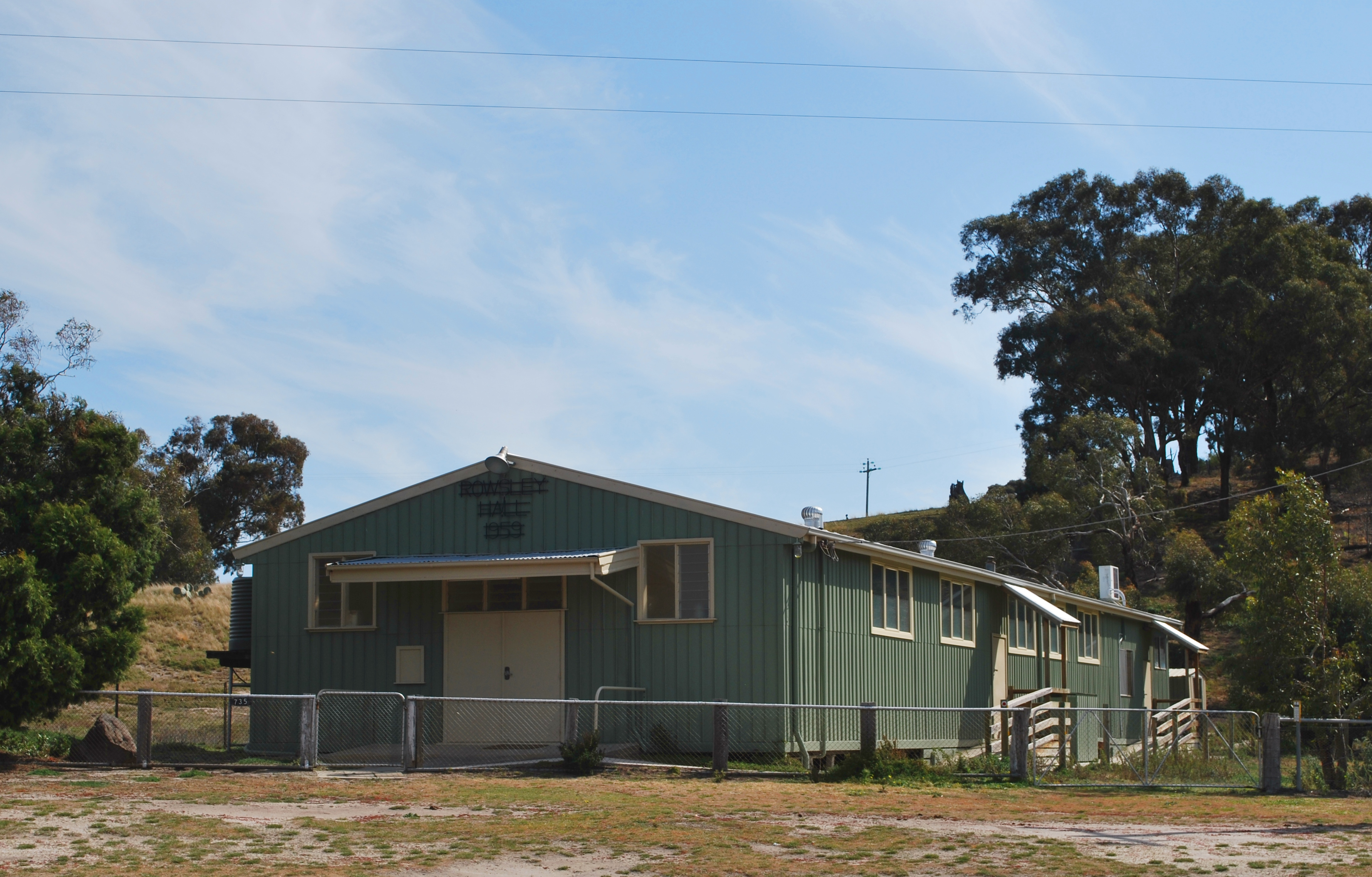
- Public hall

- Coordinates: 37°43′S 144°22′E
- Population: 192 (2016 census)
- Postcode(s): 3340
- Location: 48 km (30 mi) SE of Ballarat; 53 km (33 mi) NW of Melbourne
- LGA(s): Shire of Moorabool
- State electorate(s): Melton
- Federal division(s): Ballarat
Localities around Rowsley:
Ingliston	Maddingley	Maddingley
Glenmore	Rowsley	Parwan
Balliang	Balliang	Parwan

Rowsley is a locality in Victoria, Australia. The locality is approximately 50 kilometres (31 mi) west of Melbourne in the Shire of Moorabool local government area.

== History ==
The post office there opened on 12 May 1890, closed on 30 April 1962, reopened on 1 January 1946 and was closed in 1950.

Greystones Homestead, a historic homestead located at 565 Glenmore Road, Rowsley, is listed on the Victorian Heritage Register. Dating from 1875 to 1876, the property was purchased by prominent businessman William Charles Angliss in 1934 and was still held by his descendants in 2003.
