= Alan Bulman =

Australian rules footballer

Personal information
- Full name: Alan Bulman
- Born: 18 September 1927
- Died: 3 June 1995 (aged 67)
- Original team: Bacchus Marsh
- Height: 188 cm (6 ft 2 in)
- Weight: 89 kg (196 lb)

Playing career^{1}
| Years | Club | Games (Goals) |
| 1948–1952 | Footscray | 32 (11) |
- ^{1} Playing statistics correct to the end of 1952.

Alan Bulman (18 September 1927 – 3 June 1995) was an Australian rules footballer who played for the Footscray Football Club in the Victorian Football League (VFL).

== Footscray ==
Bulman, who played his early football with Bacchus Marsh, came to Footscray in 1945.

Bulman won the 1947 Bacchus Marsh best and fairest award.

He spent some time in the second eighteen, before making it into the seniors in the 1948 VFL season, making 12 appearances.

A follower, Bulman was unable to become a regular fixture in the Footscray team, at times troubled by injury.

== Later career ==
During the 1952 VFA season, Bulman joined Coburg, where he played for two years.

In 1954 he coached Stawell in the Wimmera Football League, then after not being reappointed for 1955 left to coach Navarre.
