= Holy Trinity Church, Bacchus Marsh =

Church building in Victoria, Australia

Coordinates: 37°40′24″S 144°26′10″E

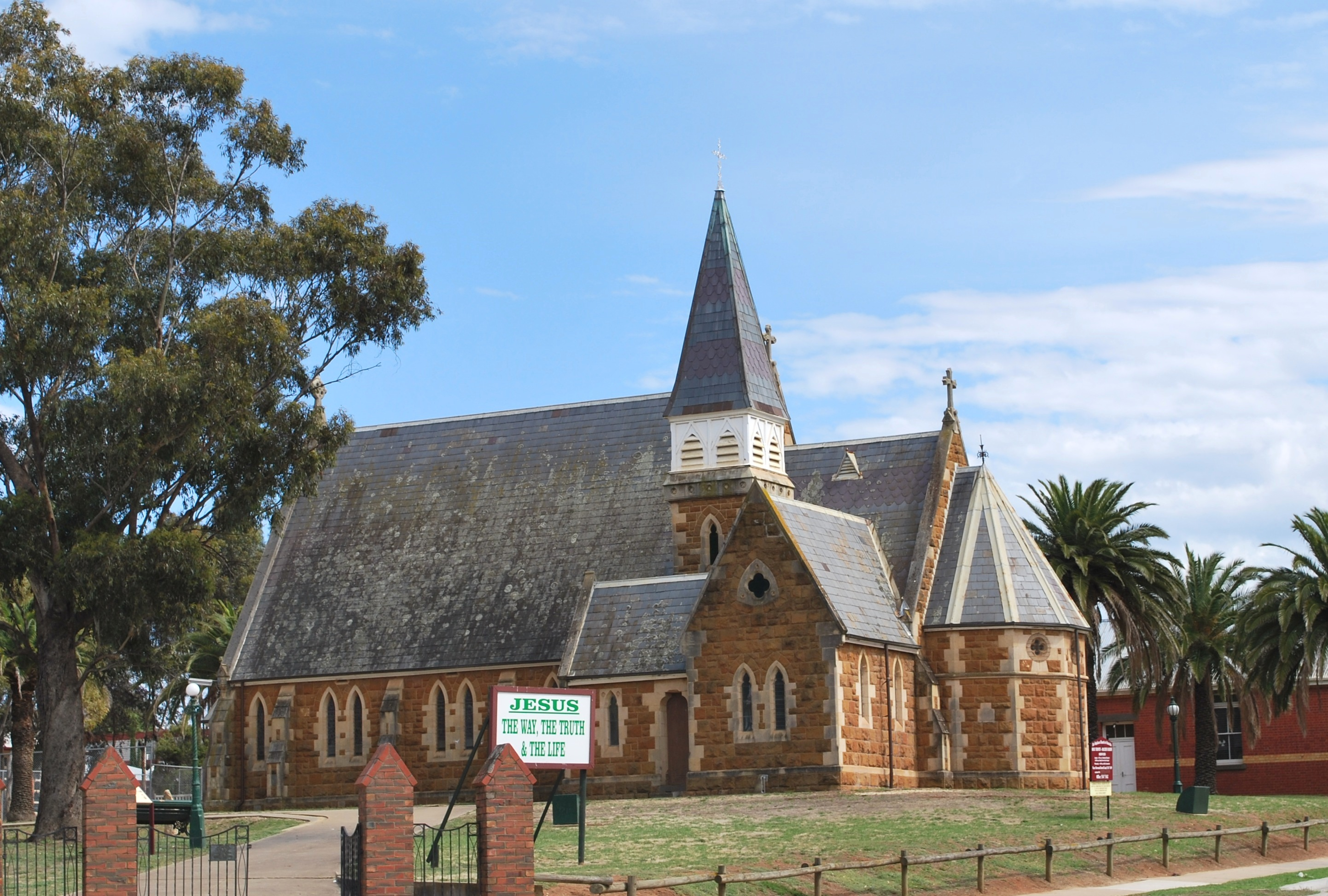
Holy Trinity, Bacchus Marsh

Holy Trinity Church is an Anglican church in Gisborne Road, in the town of Bacchus Marsh, Victoria. The church was established in 1851.

== History ==
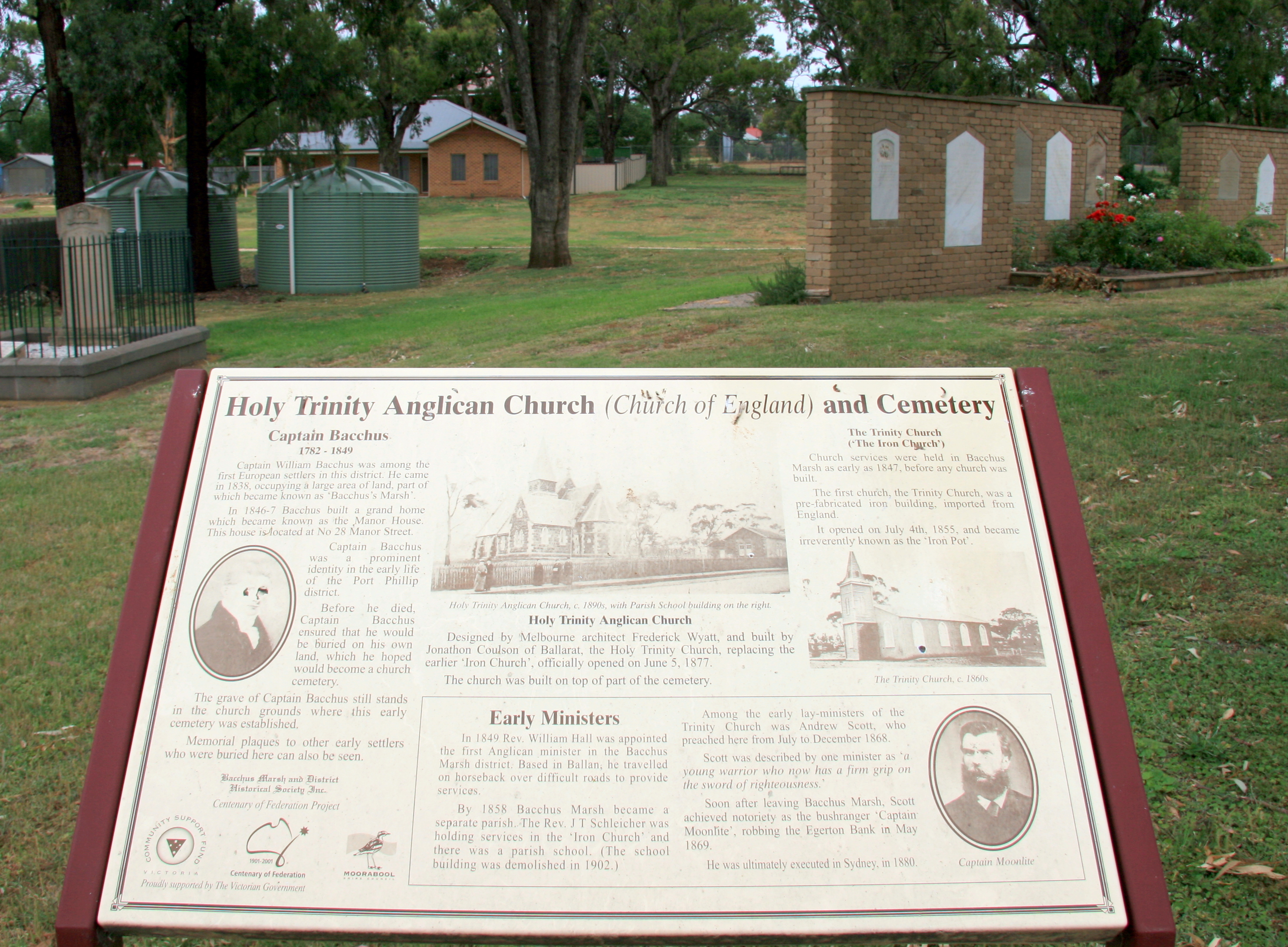
Historical information board in memorial garden

- Pre 1849 - Bacchus Marsh was probably served by itinerant preachers from around 1847.
- 1849 - first Baptism performed in January by first clergy Rev. William Hall
- 1851 - prefabricated iron church erected. Amongst the first parishes in Victoria, the land was donated by William Bacchus, son of Captain W H Bacchus after whom Bacchus Marsh is named.
- 1861 - Iron church building consecrated
- 1857 - School established on site of current hall
- 1868 - Andrew Scott (later to become bushranger "Captain Moonlite") attended as lay reader.
- 1876 - Foundation Stone Laid
- 1877 - Current Sandstone (& limestone) church opened
- 1881 - Current church consecrated, pulpit installed
- 1953 - Church gates built and consecrated
- 1955 - Hall built as a war memorial
- 1971 - Memorial garden completed
