= Monty Brown (footballer) =

Australian rules footballer (1913–1976)

Personal information
- Full name: Montague Brown
- Born: 22 April 1913; Carlton North, Victoria
- Died: 31 December 1976 (aged 63)
- Original team: University High School

Playing career^{1}
Years	Club	Games (Goals)
1937	Carlton	1 (0)
- ^{1} Playing statistics correct to the end of 1937.

Montague Brown (22 April 1913 – 31 December 1976) was an Australian rules footballer who played with Carlton in the Victorian Football League (VFL).

He was captain of the Carlton Reserves team in 1938.

At the start of the 1939 season Brown was given a clearance to the Camberwell, the next year he was cleared to Bacchus Marsh, then in 1945 he was cleared to Echuca. While at Bacchus Marsh, Brown was a signaller for the Volunteer Defence Corps during World War II. His service number was V361361.
