= Bacchus Marsh Grammar School =

Location
- Bacchus Marsh, Victoria; Australia; 37°41′27″S 144°25′54.4″E

Information
- Type: Private school, co-educational, primary and secondary, day
- Motto: Latin: Doctrina Vitae (Education for Life)
- Denomination: Ecumenical
- Established: 1988
- Principal: Debra Ogston
- Grades: K–12
- Enrolment: ~2,500 (2018)
- Colours: Dark blue, gold, black and white
- Website: www.bmg.vic.edu.au

Bacchus Marsh Grammar School is a private, co-educational, primary and secondary day school located in Maddingley, Australia.

== History ==
Bacchus Marsh Grammar School opened in February 1988.

In 2015, the school received negative press for its treatment of a transgender student who identified as a boy but staff required him to wear "the girls uniform". The student transferred to a public school with gender-neutral bathrooms to complete high school.

In 2024 a teenage male was arrested after using social media to share deepfaked pornographic images of fifty female Bacchus Marsh students in years 9 to 12.

In 2025, Debra Ogston succeeded Andrew Neal as the school's principal.

== Locations ==
Bacchus Marsh Grammar School is located in Bacchus Marsh. The campus there was built in 1988, and replaced the original campus located on Hallett's Way. In 2019, it opened a new campus for middle school students in Aintree.

== Notable alumni ==
- Dejan Vasiljevic, Australian professional basketball player for the Sturt Sabres of the NBL1 Central
