= Marshall Younger =

Australian rules footballer

Personal information
- Full name: Marshall Marcel Younger
- Born: 21 May 1939 (age 87); Ballarat, Victoria
- Original teams: St Patrick's College, Ballarat, Darley
- Height: 183 cm (6 ft 0 in)
- Weight: 73.5 kg (162 lb)
- Position: Half back / Wing

Playing career^{1}
Years	Club	Games (Goals)
1956–61	South Melbourne (VFL)	41 (9)
1962	East Perth (WANFL)	4 (2)
- ^{1} Playing statistics correct to the end of 1962.

Marshall Marcel Younger (born 21 May 1939) is a former Australian rules footballer who played with South Melbourne in the Victorian Football League (VFL).

== Family ==
He married Marlene Frances Palmer in 1961.

== Football ==
As a schoolboy at St Patrick's College, Ballarat he was an outstanding footballer and played in Darley's losing 1954 Bacchus Marsh Football League grand final.

=== South Melbourne (VFL) ===
Granted a permit on 30 March 1956, he made his debut for the South Melbourne First XVIII against Geelong, at the Lake Oval, on 14 April 1956.

=== East Perth (WANFL) ===
In 1962, he played four games with the East Perth Football Club in the Western Australian National Football League (WANFL).
