= Maddingley =

- Suburb
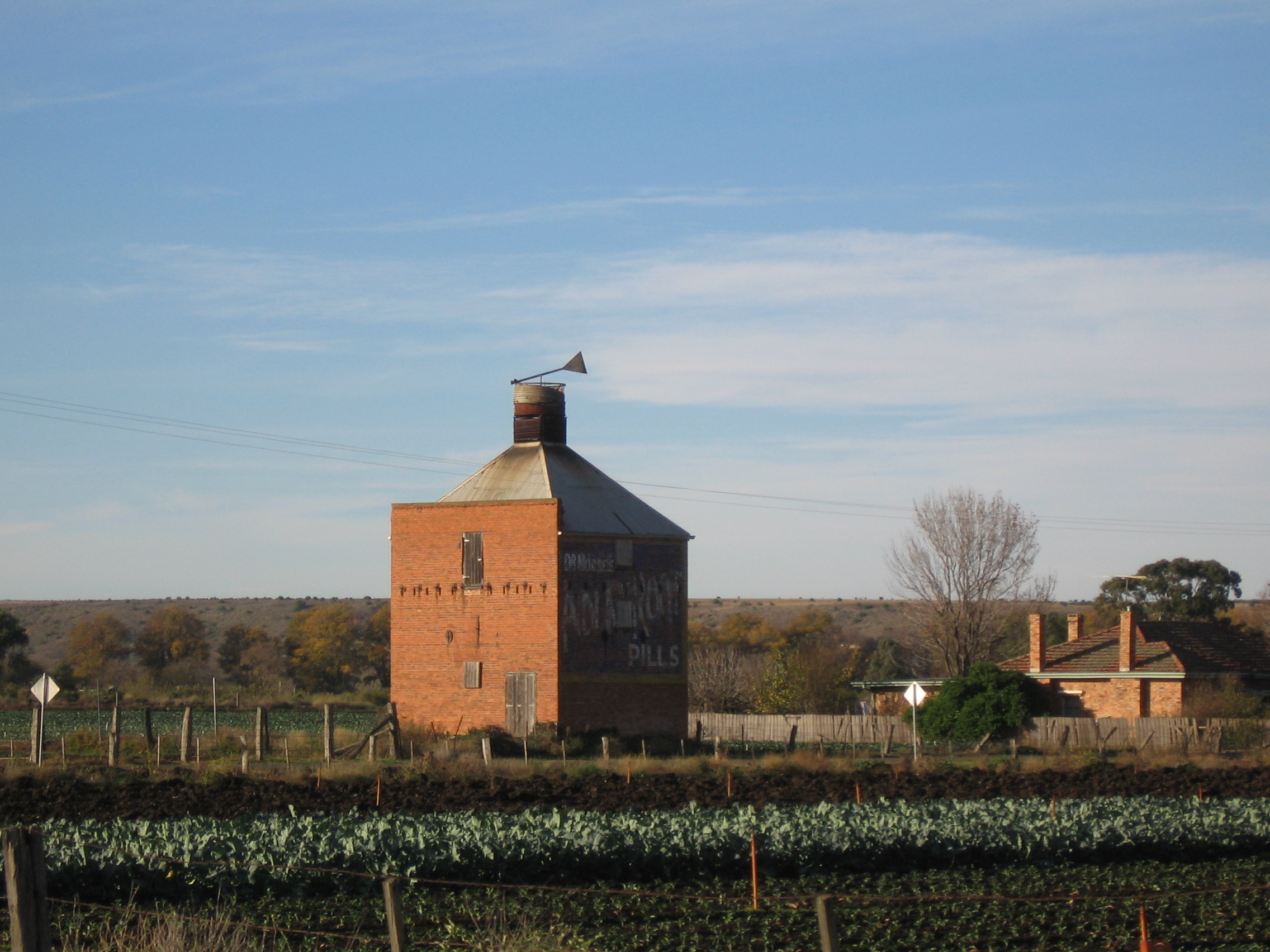
- The heritage-listed chicory kiln in Maddingley

- Interactive map of Maddingley
- Coordinates: 37°41′11″S 144°26′01″E
- Country: Australia
- State: Victoria
- City: Bacchus Marsh
- LGA: Shire of Moorabool
- Location: 61 km (38 mi) NW of Melbourne; 62 km (39 mi) E of Ballarat; 3 km (1.9 mi) S of Bacchus Marsh

Government
  - State electorate: Melton
  - Federal division: Hawke

Population
  - Total: 5,491 (2021 census)
- Postcode: 3340
Suburbs around Maddingley
Bacchus Marsh	Bacchus Marsh	Bacchus Marsh
Rowsley	Maddingley	Hopetoun Park
Rowsley	Parwan	Parwan

Maddingley is a suburb of Bacchus Marsh, a peri-urban town in central Victoria, Australia. The locality consists of the portion of the Bacchus Marsh urban area south of the Werribee River. It is in the Shire of Moorabool, 61 kilometres (38 mi) west north west of the state capital, Melbourne. At the 2021 census, Maddingley had a population of 5,491.

Items of interest in Maddingley include the Bacchus Marsh railway station, Bacchus Marsh College, Bacchus Marsh Grammar School and the Maddingley brown coal mine. Maddingley Park, including the Nieuwesteeg Heritage Rose Garden, is adjacent to the railway station.
