= Martin Wheelahan =

Australian rules footballer, born 1908

Personal information
- Born: 8 April 1908
- Died: 7 April 1969 (aged 60)
- Original team: Bacchus Marsh
- Height: 173 cm (5 ft 8 in)

Playing career^{1}
Years	Club	Games (Goals)
1930–1931	South Melbourne	11 (5)
- ^{1} Playing statistics correct to the end of 1931.

Martin Wheelahan (8 April 1908 – 7 April 1969) was an Australian rules footballer who played with South Melbourne in the VFL during the early 1930s.

His brother Danny also played for South Melbourne.
