= Heath Scotland =

Australian rules footballer

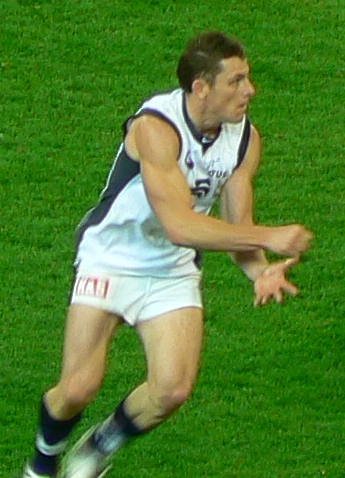

Personal information
- Full name: Heath Scotland
- Born: 21 July 1980 (age 46)
- Original teams: Darley, Western Jets (TAC Cup)
- Draft: No. 44, 1998 National draft, Collingwood
- Height: 182 cm (6 ft 0 in)
- Weight: 82 kg (181 lb)
- Position: Midfielder

Playing career^{1}
Years	Club	Games (Goals)
1999–2003	Collingwood	53 (12)
2004–2014	Carlton	215 (69)
Total		268 (81)
- ^{1} Playing statistics correct to the end of 2014.

Career highlights
- Joseph Wren Memorial Trophy 2001; John Nicholls Medal 2012

Heath Scotland (born 21 July 1980) is a former Australian rules footballer in the Australian Football League. He played for Collingwood and Carlton, appearing in two AFL Grand Finals during his time with Collingwood. He was awarded the Best and Fairest for the Carlton Football Club in 2012. His professional career ended in 2014.

== Playing career ==
=== Early playing career ===
Scotland grew up and played his junior football for the Darley Football Club, then in the Riddell District Football League, and he played TAC Cup football for the Western Jets. He also featured in the National Under 18s Championships for Vic Metro in 1998.

=== Collingwood ===
He was recruited to the Australian Football League by the Collingwood Football Club with its third-round selection in the 1998 AFL draft (No. 44 overall). Scotland was initially given guernsey No. 44, and he switched to No. 29 in 2001. He made his debut in Round 3 of 1999 and played twelve senior matches in his debut season, including Collingwood's Round 22 match, which was the last game it ever played at its traditional home ground, Victoria Park. He played another ten in 2000, but managed only two senior games in 2001 – in the first and last rounds of the season. His performance in that final round match, to that stage a career-best with twenty-eight disposals, arguably saved his Collingwood career, with senior coach Mick Malthouse stating that he had matured considerably as a footballer over that season.

Scotland became a regular for the Magpies in 2002, playing 19 matches through the season, including fourteen consecutively after Round 12. He played in all of Collingwood's finals matches, including the Grand Final loss against Brisbane. In 2003, he fell out of favour again, playing only sporadically throughout most of the season; however, he gained selection again in Round 20, and played every game for the rest of the year, including another Grand Final loss against Brisbane, which was his last game for Collingwood.

In his five seasons at Collingwood, Scotland was generally characterised as a midfielder or half-back flanker at a club which had several players of similar ability capable of filling that role; he therefore struggled to be a regular member of senior coach Mick Malthouse's regular 22. Scotland decided that his long-term opportunities at Collingwood would be limited under Malthouse, and after discussions with Carlton senior coach Denis Pagan, he requested to be traded to Carlton at the end of 2003. He had previously considered a move to the Kangaroos (where Pagan was then coaching) after playing only two games in 2001.

Scotland was described by Tony Shaw, who coached him in his first season with Collingwood, as a truly skilful player, capable of kicking on with both feet, with good durability and a good football brain.

Scotland played with Collingwood from 1999 until 2003 for a total of 53 games and 12 goals.

=== Carlton ===
At the end of the 2003 season, Scotland was traded to Carlton in exchange for a third round draft pick (No. 35 overall) in the 2003 AFL draft. Even at the time, the trade was considered to be good value for Carlton, He was given the No. 29 guernsey, the same number he had worn at Collingwood.

Scotland was a regular player throughout most of his time at Carlton. He played 11 seasons with the club and appeared in every game in five of those seasons. As at Collingwood, Scotland played generally as a midfielder, rotating into a sweeping half-back role.

In Round 9, 2005, Scotland played in Carlton's team in the last game it ever played at its traditional home ground at Princes Park; he had previously played in Collingwood's last game at its traditional suburban home, making him the only player to appear in both of these historic matches. In 2006, Scotland finished third in the Robert Reynolds Trophy, and had the second-most disposals of any player in the AFL. He improved again in 2007, collecting a career-high 41 disposals in a match in Round 22 against Melbourne, finishing a close second for the Robert Reynolds Trophy, and polling a club-high 12 Brownlow Medal votes.

In the young Carlton teams he played in, Scotland was one of the most experienced players. He featured in the club's leadership group from 2007 until 2010, before voluntarily stepping down in 2011. He continued to play reliable football through this time. In 2011, Scotland played his 200th game and became the oldest player on the Carlton list, turning 31 during the year; in spite of this, 2011 was widely regarded by pundits as Scotland's best season to date; he was nominated in the 40-man squad for the All-Australian team, but did not make the final team, and he finished 4th in the John Nicholls Medal. He was awarded life membership of the Carlton Football Club in December 2011. Scotland played consistently well again in 2012, and although he attracted less wider acclaim around the league, he won the John Nicholls Medal for the first time in his career.

In 2014, at age 33, Scotland was moved from Carlton's senior list to its rookie list, by being delisted and then redrafted as a rookie. He played four games off the rookie list, before announcing his retirement from the AFL on 20 May 2014, citing a degenerative ankle complaint.

Scotland played with Carlton from 2004 until 2014 for a total of 215 games and 69 goals.

In September 2019, five years after his retirement his playing career, he gave an interview on SEN radio station and reflected on his time at Carlton stating "To be honest, I think it was a poor decision to sack Brett Ratten as senior coach" and "I was always disappointed that happened to Ratts" and "I thought Ratts was doing a great job, I think we might've won 11 games in 2012, we just missed finals, we had a lot of injuries" and "I think Carlton acted on the opportunity to get Mick Malthouse too quickly as senior coach". Scotland then praised his former senior coach Ratten at Carlton stating "For me, as a player and now a young coach, you learn from the coaches you've had and he was probably the man I learnt the most from in my time in playing".

== Personal life ==
Scotland is married to wife Alisha. They have two sons, Tyler and Riley.

During January 2012, Scotland was involved in a brawl at the Mulwala Ski Club near Yarrawonga, which left one man unconscious. In April 2012, he was formally charged with common assault, assault occasioning actual bodily harm and violent disorder relating to the incident. At the court hearing in October 2012, he pleaded guilty to assault, and was placed on a two-year good behaviour bond with a conviction.
