= Danny Wheelahan =

Australian rules footballer

Personal information
- Born: 28 January 1903
- Died: 30 August 1991 (aged 88)
- Original teams: Ballan, Bacchus Marsh
- Height: 170 cm (5 ft 7 in)
- Weight: 67 kg (148 lb)

Playing career^{1}
Years	Club	Games (Goals)
1926–1930	South Melbourne	51 (4)
- ^{1} Playing statistics correct to the end of 1930.

Danny Wheelahan (28 January 1903 – 30 August 1991) was an Australian rules footballer who played with South Melbourne in the VFL during the late 1920s.

Wheelahan had a brief career with South Melbourne but won their Rohan Cup as the best and fairest player in 1929. His brother Martin also played for South Melbourne.
