= Don Watson (Australian footballer) =

Australian rules footballer, born 1905

Personal information
- Full name: Don Watson
- Born: 6 May 1905
- Died: 11 May 1948 (aged 43)

Playing career^{1}
Years	Club	Games (Goals)
1925–29	North Melbourne	31 (0)
- ^{1} Playing statistics correct to the end of 1929.

Don Watson (6 May 1905 – 11 May 1948) was an Australian rules footballer who played with North Melbourne in the Victorian Football League (VFL).

Watson secured employment in Bacchus Marsh and played with them in 1930 and was appointed as captain coach in 1931. Bacchus Marsh were runner up to Geelong West in the 1931 Geelong & District Football League grand final.

Watson was also the secretary of Bacchus Marsh from 1932 to 1933.

Watson was coach of Maddingley when he died suddenly.
