= Sandy Talbot =

Australian rules footballer (1949–2018)

Personal information
- Full name: Alexander M. Talbot
- Born: 30 July 1949
- Died: 25 December 2018 (aged 69)
- Original teams: Bacchus Marsh, East Ballarat
- Height: 189 cm (6 ft 2 in)
- Weight: 81 kg (179 lb)
- Position: Full-back

Playing career^{1}
Years	Club	Games (Goals)
1970–73	Essendon	33 (0)
- ^{1} Playing statistics correct to the end of 1973.

Alexander M. "Sandy" Talbot (30 July 1949 – 25 December 2018) was an Australian rules footballer who played with Essendon in the Victorian Football League (VFL). He later played for Preston in the Victorian Football Association (VFA), was captain-coach of Daylesford, and finished his career with his old side, Bacchus Marsh.
