= Graham Middleton =

Australian rules footballer

Personal information
- Full name: Graham S. Middleton
- Born: 22 December 1950
- Died: 6 December 2011 (aged 60)
- Original team: Essendon High
- Height: 189 cm (6 ft 2 in)
- Weight: 80.5 kg (177 lb)
- Position: Wing

Playing career^{1}
| Years | Club | Games (Goals) |
| 1973 | Essendon | 1 (0) |
- ^{1} Playing statistics correct to the end of 1973.

Graham Middleton (22 December 1950 – 6 December 2011) was an Australian rules footballer who played with Essendon in the Victorian Football League (VFL). In 1974 he played for Bacchus Marsh.

== Sources ==
- Holmesby, Russell & Main, Jim (2007). The Encyclopedia of AFL Footballers. 7th ed. Melbourne: Bas Publishing.
- Graham Middleton's playing statistics from AFL Tables
- Graham Middleton at AustralianFootball.com
