= Bacchus Marsh Airfield =

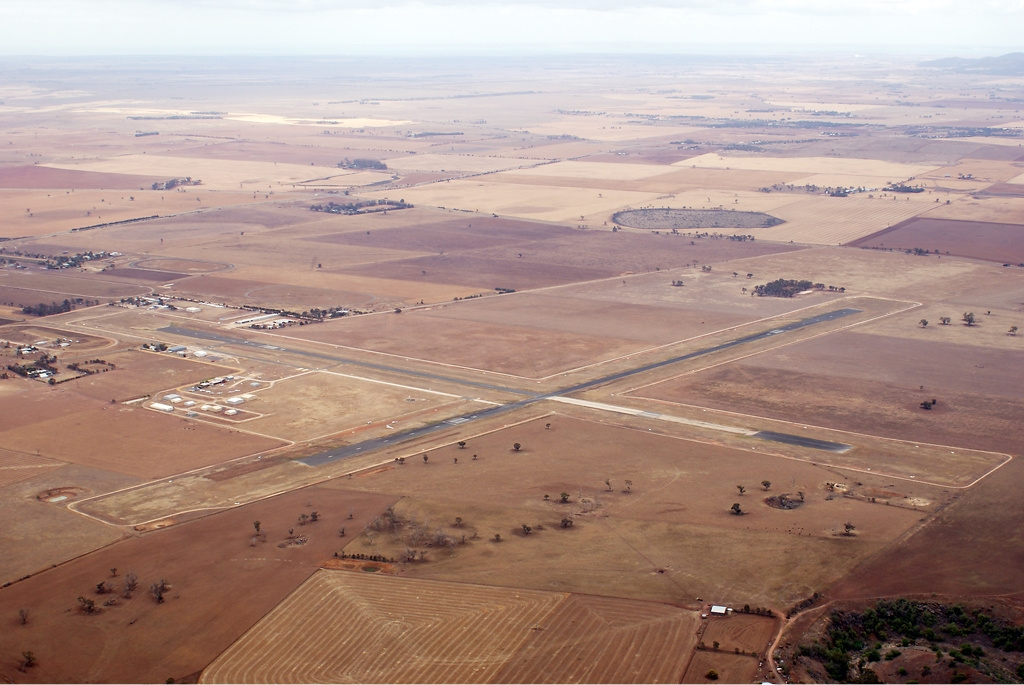
- IATA: none; ICAO: YBSS

Summary
- Airport type: Public
- Owner: Shire of Moorabool
- Operator: Bacchus Marsh Aerodrome Management Inc. www.YBSS.com.au
- Location: Bacchus Marsh, Victoria
- Elevation AMSL: 520 ft (160 m)
- Coordinates: 37°44′00″S 144°25′18″E

Map
- Location in Victoria

Runways
Direction	Length		Surface
Direction	m	ft	Surface
09/27	1,524	5,000	Asphalt
01/19	1,554	5,098	Asphalt
- Sources: AIP

Bacchus Marsh Airfield (ICAO: YBSS) is located 3.5 nautical miles (6.5 km; 4.0 mi) south of Bacchus Marsh, Victoria, Australia.

The airfield is owned by the Shire of Moorabool, but is operated by the Bacchus Marsh Airfield Management (BMAM). BMAM comprises representatives of the shire, airfield hangar owners, airfield users group, (the Geelong Gliding Club, Victorian Motorless Flight Group and the Beaufort Gliding Club), and TVSA Pilot Training (a power flying school).

The airfield has an elevation of 520 ft (158 m) above sea level, consists of two sealed cross strips with wide grass verges on either side (alignments 01/19 1,554 m (5,098 ft), and 09/27 1,524 m (5,000 ft)). The gliding clubs conduct a combined operation launching from the grass verges, while the power school operates concurrently from the sealed strips

== Gliding ==
Bacchus Marsh airfield (YBSS) is the largest gliding site in the southern hemisphere, and double the size of other gliding facilities in Australia. The site offers a variety of soaring conditions. Thermal conditions enable soaring for most of the year, and are sufficiently reliable to enable cross country flying from September to April. Late in the afternoon though, lift can be damped with sea breeze fronts moving in from the south east. The higher terrain to the north and north west can lead to the development of wave and ridge lift especially during the winter months. Frontal lift is also frequently seen at the site.

The airfield is located in the rolling volcanic plains of western Victoria. The topography to the east and south consists of flat farming land extending to Port Phillip Bay and Bass Strait respectively. To the north the terrain dips initially into the Werribee River valley, with the Bacchus Marsh township, before rising to the Blackwood Ranges; the foothills to the Great Dividing Range. To the west the land is used mainly for agricultural purposes. An escarpment; the Brisbane Ranges, results in the terrain altitude increasing abruptly by 800 ft (240 m), but is quite suitable for cross country flying at all skill levels.

Due to the proximity to Melbourne Airport, soaring at the site operates under a restricted ceiling of 4,500 ft (1,372 m) above sea level immediately above the site, however this ceiling steps to 8,500 ft (2,591 m) a few kilometres to the west and progressively thereafter to 20,000 ft (6,096 m). To the south the ceiling again steps up progressively. Operations to the east are limited by the decreasing height of the ceiling, and to the north by a combination of the mountain ranges and air traffic ceilings.

== See also ==
- List of airports in Victoria, Australia
