= Frank Pomeroy =

Australian rules footballer

Personal information
- Full name: Francis John Pomeroy
- Born: 27 July 1939
- Original team: Ballarat School of Mines
- Height: 188 cm (6 ft 2 in)
- Weight: 85 kg (187 lb)

Playing career^{1}
Years	Club	Games (Goals)
1959–62	Geelong	32 (29)
1964	North Melbourne	10 (0)
Total		42 (29)
- ^{1} Playing statistics correct to the end of 1964.

Not to he confused with Arizona politician Frank T. Pomeroy or Kansas politician Frank C. Pomeroy

Frank Pomeroy (born 27 July 1939) is a former Australian rules footballer who played with Geelong and North Melbourne in the Victorian Football League (VFL).
