= Pioneer Women's Memorial Avenue =

Memorial in Victoria, Australia

Coordinates: 37°40′17″S 144°25′26″E

The Pioneer Women's Memorial Avenue, located in Bacchus Marsh, Victoria, Australia commemorates the contributions of women to the development of the area.

The Avenue was originally planted in 1936, the centenary of the settlement of Bacchus Marsh, by the local branch of the Country Women's Association. An avenue of Claret Ash trees was planted on the Western Highway, each tree honouring an individual woman settler. The CWA provided the trees, and the local council provided the tree-planting labour. Name plaques for each tree were paid for by public donations. A total of 276 trees were planted - a tree for every woman who was born or lived in the area prior to 1890. Indigenous Kulin women were named and recognised alongside white women.

In 1995, a report by the Victorian Heritage Register showed that only 15-17 of the original trees had survived.

In 2008, the Bacchus Marsh CWA applied for and received grants from the state government's Centenary of Women's Suffrage funds and the Shire of Moorabool council to re-develop the memorial. A rotunda, featuring information boards on the women commemorated in the avenue, and a monument, were added at Stamford Hill. These were unveiled in a ceremony on 2 August 2008.

In December 2009, the Moorabool council nominated the Bacchus Marsh CWA's work on erecting the rotunda for the Community Event of the Year.

In 2015, the Bacchus Marsh CWA published a book of biographies of the women commemorated in the avenue.
