= Bacchus Marsh College =

Coordinates: 37°41′9″S 144°25′59″E

Bacchus Marsh Secondary College
- Bacchus Marsh, Victoria; Australia

Information
- Type: Public, co-educational, day school
- Motto: Latin: Ad Altiores (To the highest)
- Established: 1921
- Principal: Dionne Fenton
- Staff: ~100
- Years: 7–12
- Enrolment: 850
- Colours: Blue and gold
- Website: www.bmsc.vic.edu.au

Bacchus Marsh College is a secondary school in the town of Bacchus Marsh, Victoria, Australia. It was opened in 1912 as Bacchus Marsh High School, and then later became Bacchus Marsh Secondary College. The college started with 38 students.

== Darley campus ==
The second campus began construction on 30 August 1991 (according to the foundation stone within the campus). The college opened in December 1991, housing students in Years 7, 8 and 9.

The college is situated at the far end of Hallett's Way, at the bottom of Bald Hill. There are approximately 434 students at the Darley campus. Years 7 and 8 have set courses, whereas Year 9 gives students the opportunity to choose some of their own subjects. The Darley Campus merged with the Maddingley campus in 2009. Portable learning facilities are installed on the Maddingley campus to house years 7, 8 and 9. Darley campus closed at the end of 2008 and Bacchus Marsh College now operates at one site at Maddingley.

== Maddingley campus ==
The Maddingley campus was opened in 1921. Until 1991, when the Darley campus was built, this was the only government High School in Bacchus Marsh. However, after the Darley campus' closure, it resumed being the only government High School in Bacchus Marsh.

The campus shares the use of the Bacchus Marsh Leisure Centre with the school, and was formerly managed by the YMCA.

== Sport houses ==
The school has four houses, Manning (red), Main (green), Smith (blue) and Symington (yellow). They were established in 1951, and named after ex-students who were killed during World War II – Charles Manning, Kenneth Main, Campbell "Cam" Smith and brothers Henry "Ebb" and William "Bill" Symington.

== RACV Energy Breakthrough ==
Since 2005, Bacchus Marsh College has competed in the annual RACV Energy Breakthrough event (often abbreviated as EBT), which has led to the establishment of the BMC Racing Team, and a special uniform for all members of said team.

== Production ==
Despite being claimed as "a highlight of the school year", the College production has become underfunded and understaffed, leaving the students to handle most of it themselves; teachers going so far as to prohibit primary schools from coming to watch, despite what the website would have you believe. The era of grand, immersive storytelling which consistently captivated sold-out audiences night after night has, regrettably, become a relic of the past.
