= Ken Lippiatt =

Australian rules footballer

Personal information
- Full name: Kelvin Sydney Lippiatt
- Born: 6 January 1920; Coburg, Victoria
- Died: 2 May 2013 (aged 93); Mornington, Victoria
- Original team: Coburg
- Height: 173 cm (5 ft 8 in)
- Weight: 77 kg (170 lb)

Playing career^{1}
Years	Club	Games (Goals)
1944–46	Hawthorn	30 (0)
- ^{1} Playing statistics correct to the end of 1946.

Kelvin Sydney Lippiatt (6 January 1920 – 2 May 2013) was an Australian rules footballer who played with Hawthorn in the Victorian Football League (VFL).

His brother Harry Lippiatt played with Essendon in the VFL.

Prior to his VFL career, Lippiatt served as a private in the Volunteer Defence Corps during World War II.
