= Harry Lippiatt =

Australian rules footballer (1917–1997)

Personal information
- Full name: Harry Vining Lippiatt
- Born: 24 December 1917; Fitzroy North, Victoria
- Died: 13 December 1997 (aged 79)
- Original team: Alphington
- Height: 177 cm (5 ft 10 in)
- Weight: 70 kg (154 lb)

Playing career^{1}
Years	Club	Games (Goals)
1938–39	Essendon	22 (1)
- ^{1} Playing statistics correct to the end of 1939.

Harry Vining Lippiatt (24 December 1917 – 13 December 1997) was an Australian rules footballer who played with Essendon in the Victorian Football League (VFL).

== Family ==
The son of Harry Vining Lippiatt (1892–1984), and Olive Victoria Bertha Lippiatt (1897–1961), née Marshall, Harry Vining Lippiatt was born at Fitzroy North, Victoria on 24 December 1917. His brother Kelvin Sydney "Ken" Lippiatt (1920–2013) played VFL football with Hawthorn.

He married twice. Hie married his first wife, Grace Goudge (1918–2007), at Thornbury, Victoria on 9 April 1941. His second wife was Brenda Florence Shying (1917–1999), née Herz.
