= Jack Skinner (Australian footballer) =

Australian rules footballer

John Skinner

Personal information
- Full name: John William Skinner
- Born: 5 June 1917; Bacchus Marsh, Victoria
- Died: 12 April 1988 (aged 70); Newcastle, New South Wales
- Original teams: Bacchus Marsh, Darley
- Height: 173 cm (5 ft 8 in)
- Weight: 74 kg (163 lb)

Playing career^{1}
Years	Club	Games (Goals)
1939–1941	Carlton	38 (9)
- ^{1} Playing statistics correct to the end of 1941.

John William Skinner (5 June 1917 – 12 April 1988) was an Australian rules footballer who played with Carlton in the Victorian Football League (VFL).

Skinner won the 1936 and 1938 Bacchus Marsh & Melton District Football Association best and fairest award, the Cyril C. Jones Trophy.

Skinner won the 1949 Bacchus Marsh & Melton District Football Association goalkicking award, with 55 goals.

Skinner later served in the Australian Army during World War II.

Skinner was a first cousin of Carlton footballer, Les Carr.
