= Merrimu =

- Suburb
- Interactive map of Merrimu
- Coordinates: 37.657115°S 144.477223°E
- Country: Australia
- State: Victoria
- LGA: Shire of Moorabool

Government
  - State electorate: Melton
  - Federal division: Hawke

Population
  - Total: 397 (2021 census)
- Postcode: 3340

Merrimu is a locality in the Shire of Moorabool, Victoria, Australia. Merrimu is located 70 kilometers northwest of the city of Melbourne. At the 2021 census, Merrimu had a population of 397.
