= Ray Bamford =

Australian rules footballer, born 1915

Personal information
- Full name: Ray Bamford
- Born: 15 September 1915
- Died: 29 September 1994 (aged 79)
- Original team: Bacchus Marsh / Shepparton
- Height: 180 cm (5 ft 11 in)
- Weight: 86 kg (190 lb)

Playing career^{1}
Years	Club	Games (Goals)
1942	North Melbourne	2 (0)
1944	Geelong	1 (0)
Total		3 (0)
- ^{1} Playing statistics correct to the end of 1944.

Ray Bamford (15 September 1915 – 29 September 1994) was an Australian rules footballer who played with North Melbourne and Geelong in the Victorian Football League (VFL).
