= Les Watkins =

Australian rules footballer, born 1914

Personal information
- Full name: Les Watkins
- Born: 23 May 1914
- Died: 5 July 1974 (aged 60)
- Original team: Bacchus Marsh
- Height: 173 cm (5 ft 8 in)
- Weight: 71 kg (157 lb)

Playing career^{1}
Years	Club	Games (Goals)
1938	Carlton	1 (1)
- ^{1} Playing statistics correct to the end of 1938.

Les Watkins (23 May 1914 – 5 July 1974) was an Australian rules footballer who played with Carlton in the Victorian Football League (VFL).
