= David Wilkie (footballer) =

Australian rules footballer

Personal information
- Full name: David James Wilkie
- Born: 27 June 1914
- Died: 9 August 2011 (aged 97)
- Original teams: Bacchus Marsh, Castlemaine
- Height: 178 cm (5 ft 10 in)
- Weight: 77 kg (170 lb)

Playing career^{1}
Years	Club	Games (Goals)
1934	Essendon	1 (3)
- ^{1} Playing statistics correct to the end of 1934.

David James Wilkie (27 June 1914 – 9 August 2011) was an Australian rules footballer who played with Essendon in the Victorian Football League (VFL).

After gaining attention as a 17 year old player by kicking 80 goals with Bacchus Marsh in 1932 in the Geelong & District Football League, Wilkie trialled with Melbourne at the start of the 1933 VFL season. Despite scoring 30 goals in four practice games, he moved to Melton in June that year without playing a senior game. Later that same season he moved again, this time to Castlemaine.

Wilkie joined Essendon at the start of the 1934 season, scoring three goals in his only senior appearance, as Essendon were defeated heavily by South Melbourne with Bob Pratt scoring 15 goals. After a few weeks in Essendon's reserve team he moved to Fitzroy, briefly playing for their reserve team before returning to Castlemaine in the middle of the year. He played alongside Ron Barassi Sr. in Castlemaine's losing Grand Final team at the end of the season.
