= Wayne Closter =

Australian rules footballer (1945–2026)

Personal information
- Born: 26 February 1945
- Died: 6 November 2026 (aged 81)
- Original team: Darley
- Height: 180 cm (5 ft 11 in)
- Weight: 81 kg (179 lb)

Playing career^{1}
Years	Club	Games (Goals)
1964–1975	Geelong	191 (72)
- ^{1} Playing statistics correct to the end of 1975.

Wayne Closter (26 February 1945 – 6 November 2026) was an Australian rules footballer who played for Geelong in the Victorian Football League.

Closter played as both a wingman and centreman during his 191-game career, missing out on joining the 200 club due to National Service training commitments and a tour of duty fighting in Vietnam.

However, in 2007 he was inducted into the club, along with his teammate Joe Sellwood and Essendon's Jack Jones who both also served.

Closter died on 6 November 2026, at the age of 81.
