= Jack Shea (footballer) =

Australian rules footballer

Personal information
- Full name: Jack Shea
- Born: 7 August 1927
- Died: 20 March 1983 (aged 55)
- Original team: Bacchus Marsh
- Height: 170 cm (5 ft 7 in)
- Weight: 68 kg (150 lb)

Playing career^{1}
Years	Club	Games (Goals)
1945–47	Hawthorn	27 (1)
- ^{1} Playing statistics correct to the end of 1947.

Jack Shea (7 August 1927 – 20 March 1983) was an Australian rules footballer who played with Hawthorn in the Victorian Football League (VFL).
