= Darley Football Club =

Australian rules football and netball club in Victoria

Darley Devils

Names
- Full name: Darley Football Netball Club
- Nickname(s): Devils
- Former nickname(s): Darley Magpies

Club details
- Founded: 1919; 106 years ago
- Colours
- Competition: Ballarat Football League
- President: Mark Shelley
- Coach: Dan Jordan
- Captain(s): Brett Bewley
- Premierships: 1923, 1926, 1934, 1938-39, 1947, 1949-50, 1952, 1955, 1957, 1959, 1969 1970-72, 1984, 1989, 1995, 2015, 2017, 2023
- Ground(s): Darley Park

Uniforms
Home

Other information
- Official website: darleyfnc.com.au

The Darley Football Netball Club, nicknamed the Devils, is an Australian rules football and netball club based in the Victorian town of Bacchus Marsh. The football squad competes in the Ballarat Football League.

In 2017, Darley defeated Bacchus Marsh convincingly in both the first and seconds Grand Finals.

In 2023, Darley defeated North Ballarat in the Grand Final, with a last minute goal kicked by Billy Myers to steal the game by a point.

== History ==
Darley Football Club was formed in 1919 when it was known as the Magpies. In 1928, Darley applied for admission into the Geelong & District Football Association, but were unsuccessful, after the Bacchus Marsh Football Association folded in early 1928. Darley only had a junior team in 1928 and were runners up. Darley rejoined the Bacchus Marsh Football Association in 1929, but then withdrew from the newly formed Bacchus Marsh & Melton Football Association in 1930.

Darley then played in the Melton and Bacchus Marsh District Football League where the club was successful winning nine premierships between 1934 and 1957.

Darley commenced wearing black and white colours in 1947, when they purchased new jumpers and initially wore a black jumper with a white Vee.

The club then progressed into the newly formed Bacchus Marsh Football League, and was successful with premierships in 1959 and a golden era of four consecutive premierships from 1969–1972.

Darley moved into the Central Highlands Football League and again found success in 1984 before moving into the Riddell District Football League in 1986. Ruckman and local club legend Peter Keep won two league best and fairest awards in 1982 and 1984, while in the Central Highlands Football League. The committee of management at the time saw the into the Riddell District Football League as a positive move of the club wanting to test itself and its players at a higher standard.

Upon entering the Riddell League, Darley was forced to change its club emblem from the Magpies as another club in the league (Wallan Football Club) was already known by the same name. Consequently, the club voted to change its emblem to that of a Tasmanian devil which remains to this day. During the time spent in the Riddell League, the club participated in finals football in every year except 1996, and then only missing out by percentage. Success was again attained with premierships in both 1989 and 1995, with Mick Hewat successful in winning the Bowen Medal as the league best and fairest in 1988, and Lex Miller winning the same award in 1989.

With the depth of football standard in the RDFL on the decline, together with considerable opposition from former second division clubs on the formation of one division, the club voted to make the move to the highly rated Ballarat Football League with Sunbury, Melton and Melton South clubs for the commencement of the 1997 playing season.

Darley centreman, Shayne Ward, won the BFL's Henderson Medal for league best and fairest in 1999. The club has also produced many fine players who have gone to play at higher levels. These include Collingwood Brownlow Medallist Marcus Whelan, Wayne Closter a 200-game player with Geelong Football Club, and more recently Heath Scotland who played for both Collingwood Football Club (53 games) and Carlton Football Club (215 games) before retiring in 2014.

The annual general meeting held on 24 November 2009 was an historic occasion. A motion was passed that the club name be changed to the Darley Football Netball Club Inc.

Several senior list players have also had experience at AFL reserves and VFA/VFL senior level.

== Premierships ==
- Ballarat Football League
  - 2015, 2017, 2023
- Riddell District Football League
  - 1989, 1995
- Central Highlands Football League
  - 1983, 1984
- Bacchus Marsh Football League
  - 1959, 1969, 1970, 1971, 1972
- Bacchus Marsh & Melton District Football Association
  - 1934, 1938, 1939, 1947, 1949, 1950, 1952, 1955, 1957
- Bacchus Marsh District Football Association
  - 1923 - Darley: 10.8 - 68 defeated Bacchus Marsh: 7.10 - 52
  - 1926 - Darley: 7.5 - 47 d Rockbank: 6.8 - 44

== League Best and Fairest Winners ==
Seniors

- Bacchus Marsh & Melton Football Association
  - 1933 - Clive Bodycoat
  - 1936 - Jack Skinner &
  - 1936 - Jim Whelan
  - 1938 - Jack Skinner
  - 1949, 1954 & 1955 - Les Carr
- Central Highlands Football League
  - 1982 & 1884 - Peter Keep
- Riddell District Football Netball League
  - 1988 - Michael Hewat
  - 1989 - Alexis Miller
- Ballarat Football League
  - 1999 - Shayne Ward
  - 2013 - Jake Edwards
  - 2022 & 2023 - Brett Bewley

== League Goalkicking Award Winners ==
Seniors

- Bacchus Marsh & Melton Football Association
  - 1949 - Jack Skinner: 55
  - 1952 - H "Bert" Skinner: 41
  - 1953 - H "Bert" Skinner: 44
- Ballarat Football League
  - 2002 - Keenan Reynolds
  - 2003 - Keenan Reynolds
  - 2022 - Nick Rodda: 57

== VFL/AFL players ==
The following footballers played with or were drafted from Darley FC prior to playing senior VFL / AFL football, with the year indicating their VFL / AFL debut.

- 1925 - Billy Libbis - Collingwood and Melbourne
- 1933 - Marcus Whelan - Collingwood
- 1939 - Jack Skinner - Carlton
- 1947 - Les Carr - Carlton
- 1956 - Marshall Younger - South Melbourne
- 1964 - Wayne Closter - Geelong
- 1999 - Heath Scotland - Collingwood and Carlton
- 2019 - Brett Bewley - Fremantle
- 2019 - Zak Butters - Port Adelaide
- 2023 - Aaron Cadman - Greater Western Sydney

== Bibliography ==
- History of Football in the Ballarat District by John Stoward - ISBN 978-0-9805929-0-0
