= Les Carr =

Australian rules footballer

Personal information
- Full name: Les Carr
- Born: 22 May 1929
- Died: 11 May 2012 (aged 82)
- Original teams: Bacchus Marsh, Darley
- Height: 173 cm (5 ft 8 in)
- Weight: 70 kg (154 lb)

Playing career^{1}
Years	Club	Games (Goals)
1947–48	Carlton	9 (0)
- ^{1} Playing statistics correct to the end of 1948.

Les Carr (22 May 1929 – 11 May 2012) was an Australian rules footballer who played with Carlton in the Victorian Football League (VFL).

Carr won the 1949, 1954 and 1955 Bacchus Marsh & Melton District Football Association best and fairest award, representing the Darley Football Club.

Carr was captain coach of Quambatook Football Club in the Mid Murray Football League in 1951 and 1952.

Carr won both the Quambatook FC best and fairest and also the Mid Murray Football League best and fairest award in 1951.

Carr returned to Darley FC as their captain coach in 1954.
