= Stan Mullane =

Australian rules footballer, born 1915

Personal information
- Full name: Stanley John Mullane
- Born: 12 February 1915; Ballan, Victoria
- Died: 27 June 1998 (aged 83); Ballan, Victoria
- Original team: Ballan
- Height: 175 cm (5 ft 9 in)
- Weight: 70 kg (154 lb)

Playing career^{1}
Years	Club	Games (Goals)
1936–37	South Melbourne	15 (1)
1937	Geelong	1 (0)
Total		16 (1)
- ^{1} Playing statistics correct to the end of 1937.

Stanley John Mullane (12 February 1915 – 27 June 1998) was an Australian rules footballer who played with South Melbourne and Geelong in the Victorian Football League (VFL).

Mullane was recruited from Ballan after winning three consecutive Bacchus Marsh & Melton Football Association best and fairest awards in 1933, 1934 and 1935.
