= Bacchus Marsh =

- Town
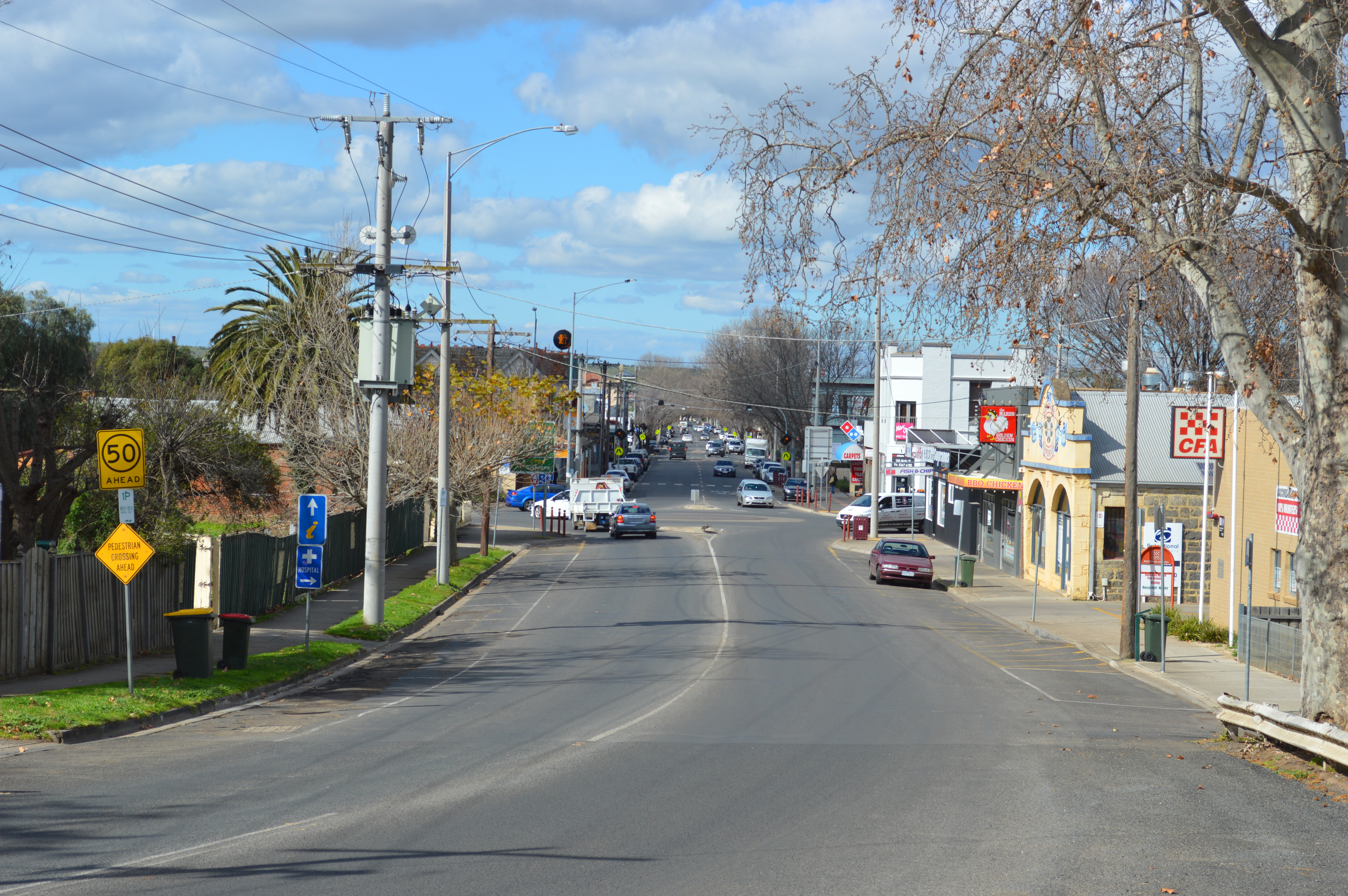
- Main St, Bacchus Marsh

- Interactive map of Bacchus Marsh
- Coordinates: 37°40′30″S 144°26′20″E
- Country: Australia
- State: Victoria
- LGA: Shire of Moorabool
- Location: 49 km (30 mi) NW of Melbourne; 52 km (32 mi) SE of Ballarat; 53 km (33 mi) N of Geelong

Government
  - State electorate: Eureka
  - Federal division: Hawke

Area
  - Total: 196.3 km^{2} (75.8 sq mi)
- Elevation: 118 m (387 ft)

Population
  - Totals: 24,717 (2021 (statistical urban area)); 7,808 (2021 (town proper))
  - Density: 125.91/km^{2} (326.12/sq mi)
- Postcode: 3340
Localities around Bacchus Marsh
Pentland Hills	Darley	Merrimu
Pentland Hills	Bacchus Marsh	Hopetoun Park
Maddingley	Maddingley	Parwan

Bacchus Marsh (Wathawurrung: Pullerbopulloke) is a town in Victoria, Australia, located approximately 50 kilometres (30 mi) north-west of the state capital Melbourne, at a near equidistance to the major cities of Melbourne, Ballarat and Geelong.

As of the 2021 census, Bacchus Marsh has a population of 7,808, while its statistical urban area (including the suburbs Darley, Maddingley, and Hopetoun Park, among others) has a population of 24,717. Bacchus Marsh is the largest urban area in the Shire of Moorabool local government area.

Traditionally a market garden area producing a large amount of the region's fruits and vegetables, in recent decades it has transformed into the main commuter town on the Melbourne–Ballarat corridor.

It was named after the colonial settler Captain William Henry Bacchus, who saw the great value of this locality as it was situated on two rivers – the Lerderderg and Werribee.

== History ==
=== Aboriginal ===
Bacchus Marsh is on the border between the Woiwurrung and Wathaurong territories of the Kulin Nation. The local clans were the Marpeang balug of the Wathaurong, and the Gunung-willam-bulluk (Wurundjeri) of the Woiwurrung. Bacchus Marsh was a meeting ground for anywhere between 150 and 400 Aboriginals even after white settlement, and corroborees were held quite regularly. While there do not appear to be any records of open hostilities between whites and indigenous people, by 1863 there were a total of only 33 Aboriginal people left in the Bacchus Marsh district, and apart from a handful of recollections of the original inhabitants preserved by pioneer settlers, little remains apart from present-day locality names, mainly of watercourses: Coimadai, Djerriwarrh, Korkuperrimul, Lerderderg, Merrimu, Myrniong, Werribee. The Wathawurrung name for the area is Pullerbopulloke with 'buluk' meaning lake.

=== European colonisation ===
One of the first white men to reach the Bacchus Marsh valley was pastoralist Kenneth Scobie Clarke (c. 1806–79), a native of Sutherland in Scotland. Clarke was a manager for the Great Lake Company of Van Diemen’s Land and arrived in the Port Phillip District from George Town on 25 March 1836. Captain Bacchus credited Clarke as being the first man to shear sheep in Victoria, although the Hentys had arrived in Portland with their sheep some two years earlier.

On 29 November 1836, Clarke headed west from Port Phillip with a large flock of sheep, arriving in the Bacchus Marsh district a few days later. He built a hut on the west bank of the Lerderderg River near Darley, and lived there until early 1838. According to pastoralist George Russell, Clarke had acted on information obtained from Mr Aitken, an Edinburgh man, who was most put out when he discovered that Clarke had beaten him to the Pentland Hills run.

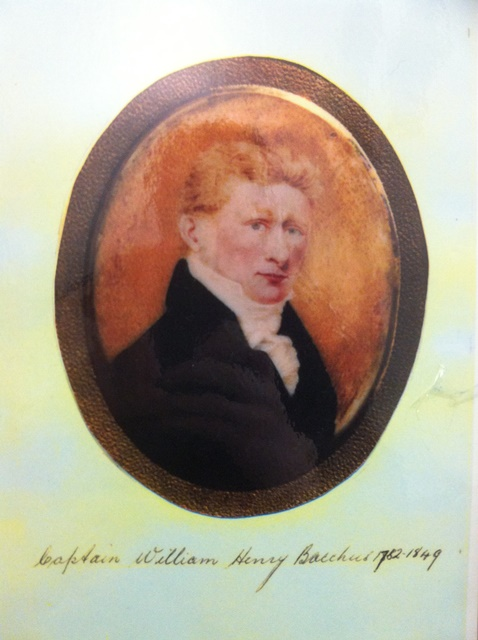
Captain William Bacchus, image from display in Bacchus Marsh Library, 2015

In 1838, Englishman Captain William Henry Bacchus (1782–1849, originally of the 2nd Royal Surrey Militia) and his son William Henry Bacchus junior (1820–87) also brought sheep from Tasmania and came to the district which now bears their name. On their arrival, Clarke made an arrangement with them and ceded his run, moving to the nearby hills known as the Pentlands. The then very swampy valley was not really suitable for sheep, as they were prone to footrot. Clarke stayed in the district until 1840 or 1841, and later went to New Zealand, where he died in 1879.

As all land within 3 miles (5 km) of a squatter’s hut was considered to belong to him, Bacchus and his son immediately set about consolidating their land holdings. By 1839–40, they had a homestead and four outstations on the Lardedark run, which in 1845 covered about 22 square miles (57 km^{2}) and carried nearly 3,000 sheep. Between 1845–47 Captain Bacchus built the Manor House, a two-storey Georgian brick building that still stands in the township today. Captain Bacchus died in 1849 and was buried in what later became the grounds of Holy Trinity Anglican Church, Gisborne Road. By 1851, Henry Bacchus junior had sold his holdings in Bacchus Marsh and moved to Peerewur (or Perewerrh) run near Ballarat.

Situated roughly halfway between Melbourne and Ballarat, Bacchus Marsh was a popular stopover for travellers during the Victorian Gold Rush. Diarist Charles Evans described the location in 1853:

We passed through a delightful valley called Bachus's Marsh [sic], the first cultivated land we have seen since we left Melbourne – barley and oats were flourishing in the richest luxuriance. There was a steam flour mill, three good looking inns, and a number of houses and stores.

=== 19th century to present ===
The township was originally known as Ballan, a Post Office opening under that name around July 1844 (Bacchus Marsh from 1 July 1850). The Bacchus Marsh Road District Board was proclaimed on 30 September 1856, with one of its first tasks being to construct a gravel road through the town, as at that time the road was barely passable in winter. Bacchus Marsh was created a district on 14 October 1862, and the Road Board was the governing body until the Shire of Bacchus Marsh was proclaimed on 23 January 1871. The railway came to Bacchus Marsh on 15 February 1887, and the through line to Ballarat was built in 1890.'

During the 1970s and 1980s it was home to the Bacchus Marsh Lion and Tiger Safari.

In 1994 the Shire of Bacchus Marsh was amalgamated with the Shire of Ballan, and parts of the Shire of Bungaree and the Shire of Werribee, to form the Shire of Moorabool.

Bacchus Marsh and its suburbs form the largest settlement in Moorabool Shire.

Bacchus Marsh grew rapidly from the 1990s.

=== Heritage listed sites ===
Bacchus Marsh contains a number of heritage listed sites, including:

- Bacchus Marsh Road, Bacchus Marsh Avenue of Honour
- 123 Main Street, Bacchus Marsh Court House
- 8 Gisborne Road and 8 Church Street, Bacchus Marsh Express Office and Printing Works
- 119 Main Street, Bacchus Marsh Police Station and Old Lock-Up
- 100–102 Main Street, Blacksmith's Cottage and Shop
- 12 Ellerslie Court, Ellerslie
- 28–32 Manor Street, Manor House
- 37 Grant Street, Millbank
- 6 Gisborne Road, Residence
- 10 Gisborne Road, Residence

In addition, a Pioneer Women's Memorial Avenue commemorates the lives of the women of the Bacchus Marsh area.

== Urban structure ==
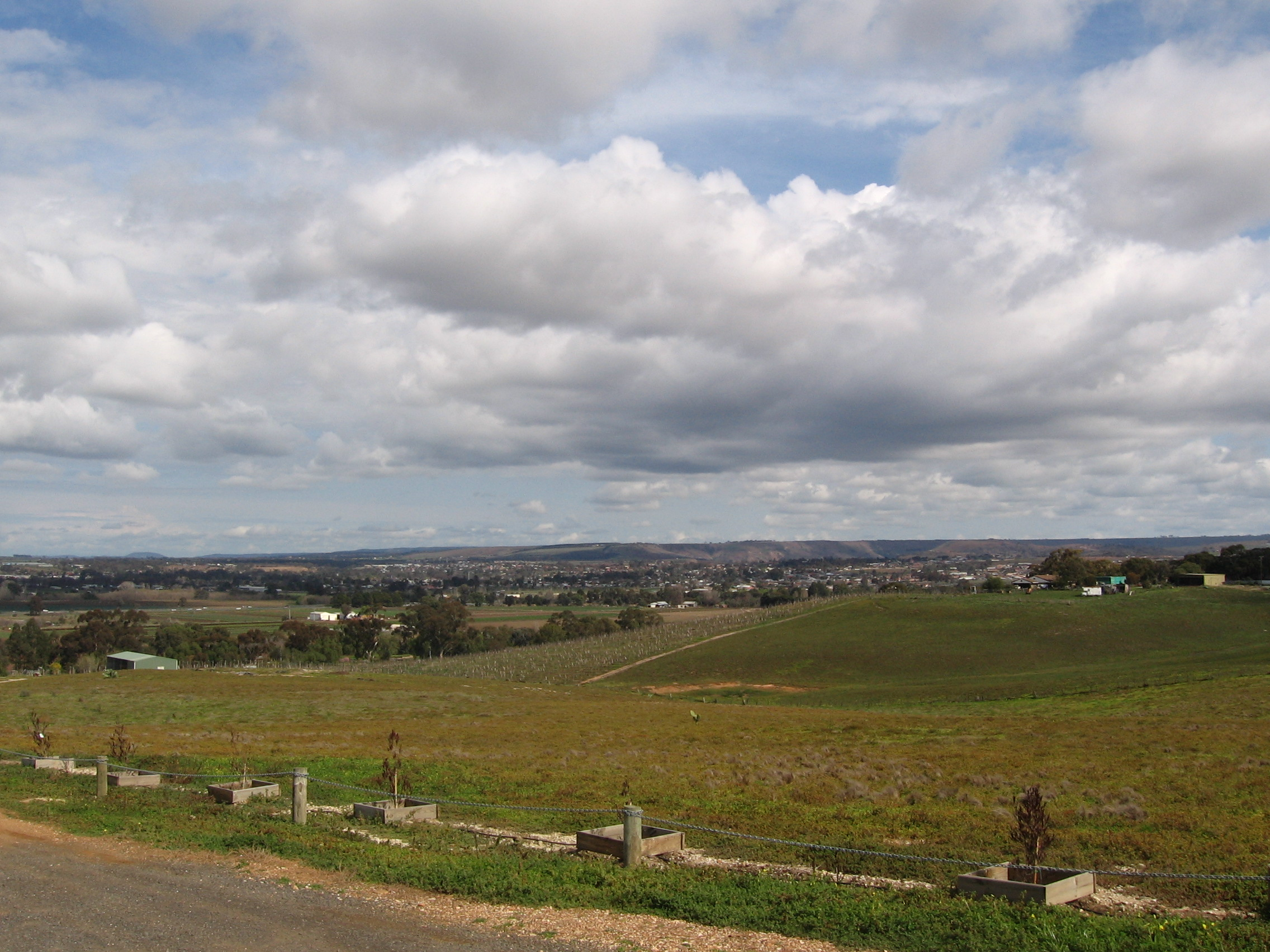
The urban area as viewed from its rural-urban fringe.

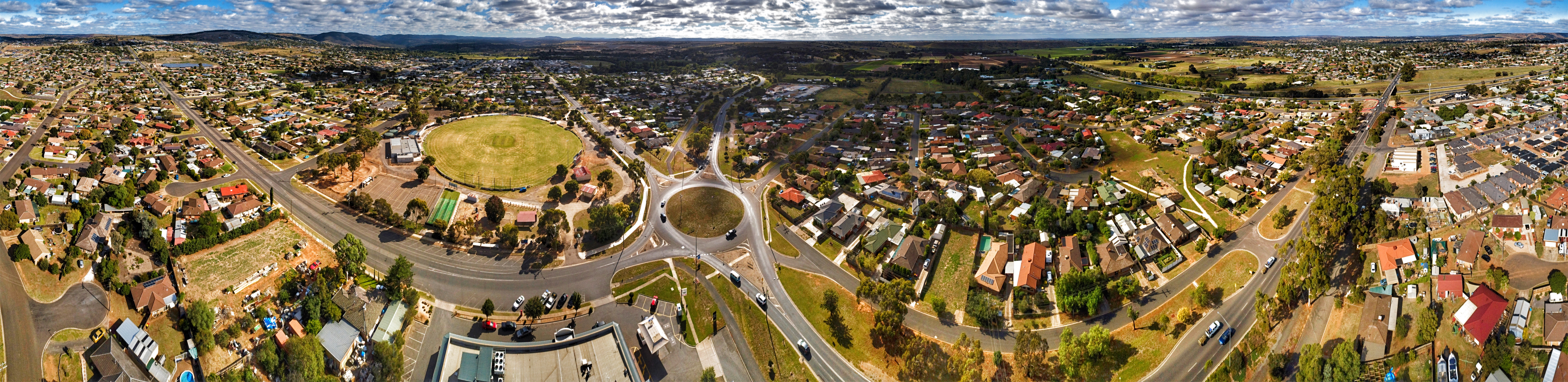
Aerial perspective of Bacchus Marsh. Taken Autumn 2018

At the 2021 census, Bacchus Marsh had a population of 24,717.

According to the 2021 census:

- Aboriginal and Torres Strait Islander people made up 1.5% of the population.
- 80.3% of people were born in Australia. The next most common countries of birth were England 3.0%, India 2.9%, New Zealand 1.4%, Scotland 0.6% and Malta 0.6%.
- 86.2% of people spoke only English at home. Other languages spoken at home included Punjabi 2.4%, Hindi and Maltese, both 0.5%.
- The most common responses for religion were No Religion 45.5%, Catholic 23.9% and Anglican 8.6%.

It covers a large area in the Werribee Valley with its Central Business District centred along Main Street between Bennett Street to the north, Grant Street/Gisborne Road to the west, Young/Lord Streets to the east and Waddell/Simpson Streets to the south. Bacchus Marsh Village shopping centre is its main indoor shopping mall. The state suburb by the same name is home to 7,808 people and contains the central business district.

Beyond central Bacchus Marsh, suburban areas such as the former towns of Darley (1861) to the north and Maddingley to the south continue to grow rapidly. Housing development has also occurred in the natural extension of Bacchus Marsh like Underbank, and its surrounding areas including Parwan, Hopetoun Park and Merrimu.

== Transport ==
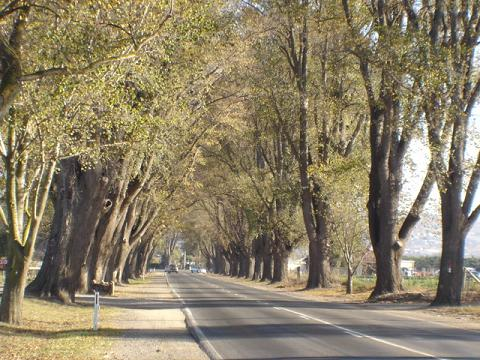
The Bacchus Marsh Avenue of Honour, an Elm tree lined avenue forms the main entrance to the CBD from the east.

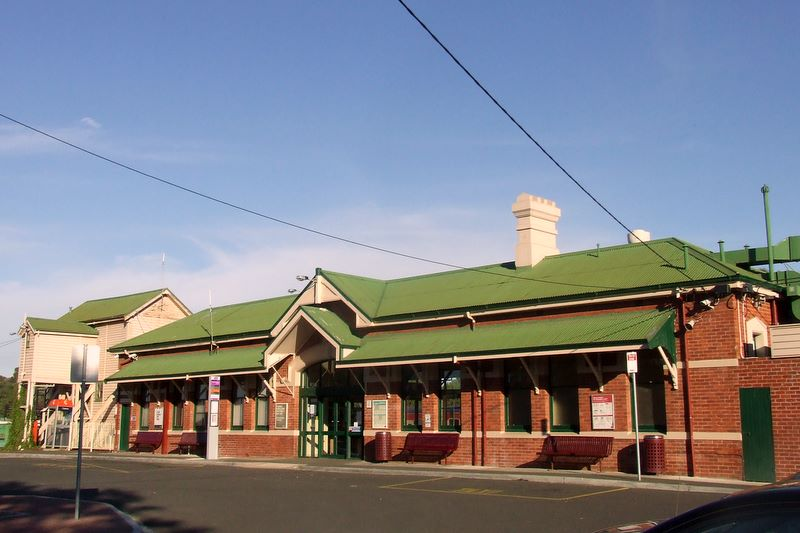
Bacchus Marsh railway station in Maddingley

Automobiles are the main form of transport. The Western Freeway which is the main route to both Melbourne (approximately 48 minutes) in the east and Ballarat (46 minutes) to the west. The freeway divides Bacchus Marsh and its northern suburb Darley. Three interchanges serve the urban area – the Gisborne Road (full- diamond) along with Hallets Way and Bacchus Marsh Road (both with a half-diamond). With the exception of the central business district and neighbouring areas, the majority of the urban area is laid out in a street hierarchy pattern with collector roads leading to the two major cross roads – Bacchus Marsh Road (C802) and Bacchus Marsh-Gisborne Road/Bacchus Marsh-Geelong Road (C704) which bear the majority of vehicular traffic.

Until 2012, the entrance to the town from Melbourne was via Anthonys Cutting, a relatively steep downhill run, which is speed limited to 80 km/h. The freeway was realigned under the Victorian Transport Plan bypassing Anthony's cutting, resulting in decreased travel time to Melbourne.

The Bacchus Marsh station is on the Ballarat line. V/Line provides VLocity services to Melbourne (from 38 minutes) and Ballarat (from 34 minutes).

A bus service connects the station with the town centre and other residential areas.

Bacchus Marsh Airfield (located in Parwan to the south) provides for general aviation and the area is home to a flying school and three gliding clubs.

== Recreation and open space ==
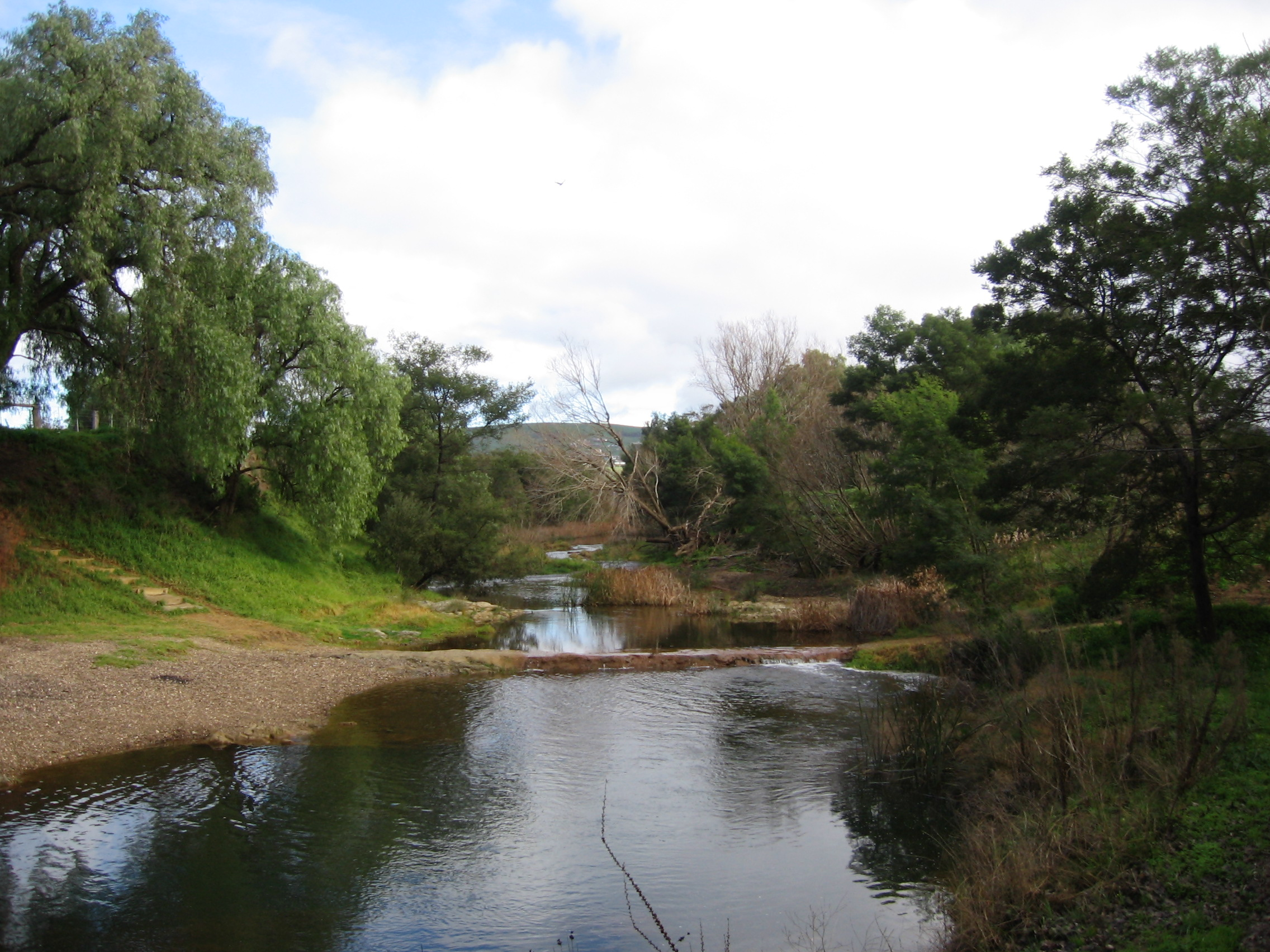
Lerderderg River

One of Bacchus Marsh’s principal recreation areas is Maddingley Park, which is a favourite picnic destination for both locals and visitors. Near the south gates of the park, opposite the Bacchus Marsh railway station, is the Nieuwesteeg Heritage Rose Garden of mainly twentieth century hybrid teas.

Walks along the Lerderderg River provide access to the steep, rugged and overgrown Lerderderg Gorge and the extensive Wombat State Park that surrounds it, criss-crossed by four-wheel drive tracks, extensive bushwalking amongst historic mining relics and natural bush.

1000 Steps aren't really 1000 steps. There are 1014 steps from suburbia to the top of Bald Hill. They form part of the Lederderg Trail and link other recreational paths and trails in the town.

Bacchus Marsh Airfield is home to the largest site in Australia for recreational gliding.

== Health services ==
The township of Bacchus Marsh is serviced by Western Health (formerly under Djerriwarrh Health Services) at the Bacchus Marsh Hospital formerly, Bacchus Marsh War Memorial Hospital, and several general practice medical centres, including Bacchus Marsh Medical Centre located opposite the hospital in Turner Street and The Elms Family Medical Centre located at the Bacchus Marsh Village Shopping Centre on Main Street near the Avenue of Honour. The Elms Family Medical Centre was established in 1994 and is actively involved in the teaching and mentoring of future general practitioners. Doctors from both practices provide comprehensive medical care to patients at the Bacchus Marsh Hospital, as well as at the local Providence Aged Care Hostel and Grant Lodge Nursing Home. Both clinics have affiliations with the Deakin University School of Medicine through the hosting of third year medical students as part of the Integrated Model of Medical Education in Rural Settings (IMMERSE) program, with The Elms first having a medical student in 2011 and the Bacchus Marsh Medical Centre in 2014.

== Education ==
Schools in Bacchus Marsh include:

- Bacchus Marsh Primary School
- Darley Primary School
- Pentland Primary School
- St Bernard's Primary School (Catholic)
- Balliang East Primary
- Bacchus Marsh College
- Bacchus Marsh Grammar

Adult & Vocational Education

- Bacchus Marsh Community College aka The Laurels
- Western Institute of Technology

Community Learning

- Darley Neighbourhood House & Learning Centre

== Sports and community groups ==
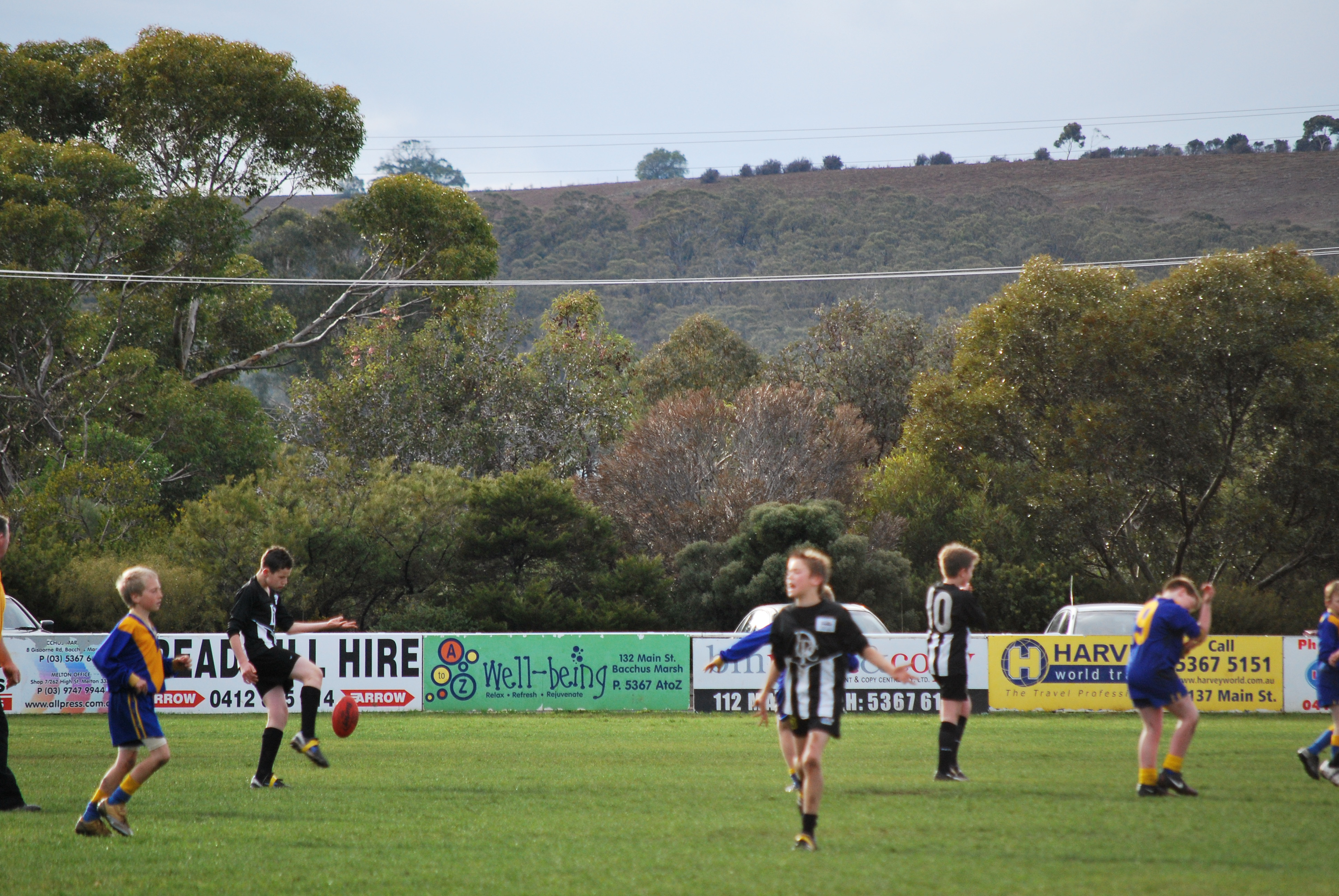
Junior Australian Rules Football at Darley Park (BFL League)

- Australian rules football, Cricket, Soccer and Netball are all very popular.
- Notable sporting teams include Darley Football Club and Bacchus Marsh Football Club who both compete in the Ballarat Football League.
- Bacchus Marsh Tigers Baseball Club compete in the Geelong Baseball Association winter competition.
- Bacchus Marsh Scorpions Soccer Club play at Masons Lane Reserve and compete in FFV metro and Ballarat and District Soccer Association. Soccer In Bacchus Marsh has grown to be one of the largest participation sports.
- Another sport that has come popular over the years in Bacchus Marsh is the Korfball Association.
- Golfers play at the Bacchus Marsh Golf Club on Links Road or at the Bacchus Marsh West Golf Club on Bacchus Marsh – Balliang Road.
- The Bacchus Marsh Tennis Club maintains 9 artificial grass courts and 13 grass courts. It is a social venue for all groups and abilities, with well maintained multi-surface courts including grass, artificial grass and red porous. A full-time club coach is available for private and group lessons.
- The airfield is also the home of three gliding clubs: Geelong Gliding Club, Melbourne Gliding Club (VMFG) and Beaufort Gliding Club. Pilots from these clubs have represented Australia in international gliding competitions.

== Notable people ==
- Emily Bates (born 1995), Australian rules footballer
- Charles Clifton Brittlebank (1863–1945), Australian scientific illustrator, plant pathologist, mycologist (fungi specialist), university lecturer and dairy farmer
- Travis Burns (born 1991), actor
- Zak Butters (born 2000), AFL player
- Sam Lalor (born 2006), AFL player
- Angus Lippiatt (born 2011), Glider Pilot and local activist. Member of both Geelong gliding club and the Adelaide soaring club.
- Peter Carey, dual Booker Prize winning author
- Liam Duggan (born 1996), AFL player
- Sir Kerr Grant (1878–1967), physicist and professor
- Frank Hardy (1917–1994), author
- Mary Hardy (1931–1985), actor and comedian, Frank Hardy's sister
- Doug Hawkins (born 1960), AFL star
- Edmond Hogan (1883–1964), Victorian Premier from 1927 to 1928 and 1929 1932
- Lesley R. Kerr (1900–1927), botanist who formulated the term and analysis of Lignotubers in Eucalyptus
- Rupert Vance Moon, Victorian Cross recipient
- Isabel Varney Desmond Peterson (1892–1967), pianist and composer
- Helen Richey, Dancing with the Stars judge
- Nick Suban (born 1990), AFL Footballer from Fremantle Football Club
- William Symington C.E. (ca.1802 – 17 March 1867), inventor and son of steamboat pioneer William Symington.
- Harry "Soapy" Vallence (1905–1991), Carlton Australian rules footballer
