= Beaufort Football Club =

Australian rules football and netball club

Beaufort

Names
- Full name: Beaufort Football Netball Club
- Nickname(s): Crows

Club details
- Founded: April 20, 1880; 144 years ago
- Colours: dark blue gold red
- Competition: Central Highlands Football League
- Premierships: 19 (1898, 1902, 1922, 1924, 1925, 1926, 1928, 1930, 1932, 1933, 1934, 1938, 1940, 1964, 1965, 1969, 1995, 1996, 2018)
- Ground(s): Park Road, Beaufort

Uniforms
Home

The Beaufort Football Netball Club is an Australian rules football and netball club from Beaufort which competes in the Central Highlands Football League. They previously played in the Ballarat Football League and Lexton Football League.

== Senior Premierships ==
Beaufort & District Football Competition (1898 - 1903)

- 1898 def Middle Creek
- 1902 def Skipton

Buangor & District Football Association (1922 - 1923)

- 1922 def Buangor

Ripon Football Association (1924-1925, 1938-1940)

- 1924 def Waterloo
- 1925 def Raglan
- 1938 def Elmhurst
- 1940 def Elmhurst

Beaufort & District Football Association (1932-1933)

- 1932 def Raglan
- 1933 def Raglan

Learmonth District Football Association (1920–1921, 1926–1931, 1934)

- 1926 def Lexton
- 1928 def Burrumbeet
- 1930 def Avoca
- 1934 def Waubra

Lexton Football League (1946–1965)

- 1964 def Lexton
- 1965 def Navarre

Ballarat Football League (1966–1993)

- 1969 def East Ballarat

Central Highlands Football League (1994- )

- 1995 def Dunnstown
- 1996 def Dunnstown
- 2018 def Buninyong

== VFL/AFL players ==
The year indicates their VFL / AFL debut.

- 1902 - Alex Sinclair - St Kilda
- 1906 - Edgar Stubbs - Geelong
- 1961 - David Norman Collingwood
- 1976 - Gary Lofts - St Kilda
- 1980 - Stuart Atkin - Collingwood
- 1983 - Dean Chiron - St Kilda, Footscray, Melbourne
- 1991 - Jamie Bond - Fitzroy
- 1998 - Shane O'Bree - Brisbane Lions, Collingwood
- 2013 - Brad Crouch - Adelaide Crows, St.Kilda
- 2014 - Matt Crouch - Adelaide Crows

== Book ==
History of Football in the Ballarat District by John Stoward - ISBN 978-0-9805929-0-0
