= Alex Sinclair =

Alex Sinclair may refer to:

- Alex Sinclair (rower)
- Alex Sinclair (footballer)

== See also ==
- Alexia Sinclair, photographer
