= Garry Fenton =

Australian rules footballer

Personal information
- Full name: Garry C. Fenton
- Born: 1 December 1942
- Original team: Golden Point (BFL)
- Height: 191 cm (6 ft 3 in)
- Weight: 89 kg (196 lb)

Playing career^{1}
Years	Club	Games (Goals)
1963–1964	Essendon	6 (0)
- ^{1} Playing statistics correct to the end of 1964.

Garry Fenton (born 1 December 1942) is a former Australian rules footballer, who played with Essendon in the Victorian Football League (VFL).

Fenton played most of his football as follower or in defence. He was recruited to Essendon after winning the 1962 Henderson Medal, while playing for Ballarat Football League club Golden Point.

Once his time at Essendon came to an end he returned to Golden Point and played there until 1969. He was captain-coach in the last two years.
