= Harry Sharp (footballer) =

Australian rules footballer (born 2002)

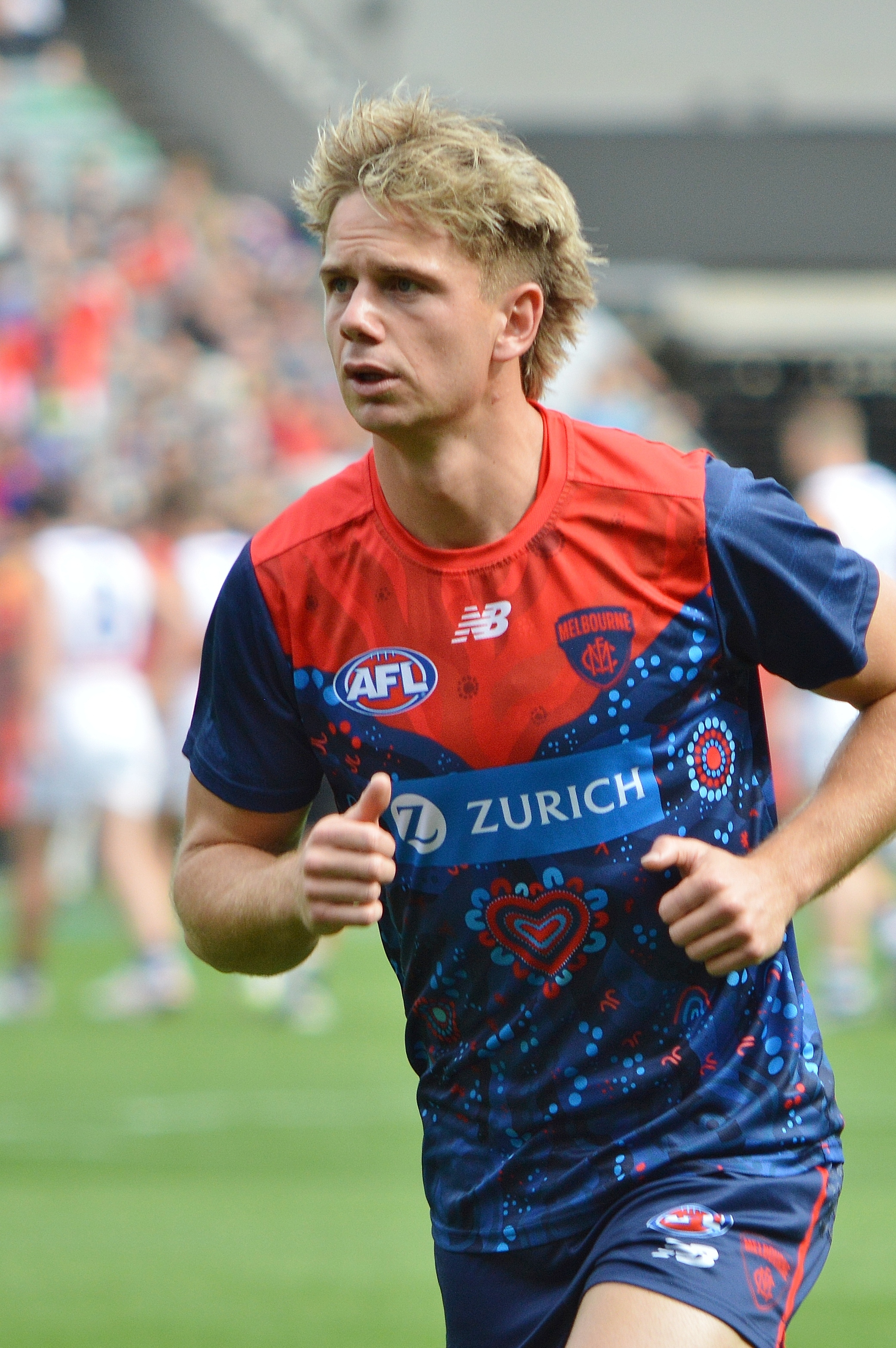
- Sharp in April 2025

Personal information
- Full name: Harry Sharp
- Born: 17 December 2002 (age 23)
- Original teams: Greater Western Victoria Rebels (NAB League); East Point (Ballarat Football League)
- Draft: No. 43, 2020 National Draft
- Debut: 20 March 2021, Brisbane Lions vs. Sydney, at the Gabba
- Height: 183 cm (6 ft 0 in)
- Weight: 69 kg (152 lb)
- Position: Forward / midfielder

Club information
- Current club: Melbourne
- Number: 30

Playing career^{1}
Years	Club	Games (Goals)
2021–2024	Brisbane Lions	16 (4)
2025–	Melbourne	42 (34)
Total		58 (38)
- ^{1} Playing statistics correct to the end of the 2026 season.

Harry Sharp (born 17 December 2002) is an Australian rules footballer who plays for the Melbourne Football Club in the Australian Football League (AFL), having previously played for the Brisbane Lions.

== Early career ==
A former steeplechase runner in his teenage years, Sharp holds the record for the AFL Draft Combine 2 km time trial, which he set at 5:28 in October 2020.

Recruited from the Greater Western Victoria Rebels in the NAB League, Sharp was drafted by the Lions with their second selection, pick 43, in the 2020 AFL draft.

== AFL career ==
Sharp made his AFL debut in the Lions' 31-point loss to Sydney at the Gabba in round one, 2021, while still completing Grade 12 at St Laurence's College. In 2023, Sharp re-signed with the Lions, extending his contract until the end of 2025. Despite being contracted, Sharp requested a trade to Melbourne following Brisbane's 2024 grand final win after he wasn't selected to play throughout the Lions' successful finals series. The trade became official on 15 October, with Sharp moving to the Demons for pick 49 and an exchange of future picks between the clubs.

== Statistics ==
Updated to the end of the 2026 season.

Legend
G	Goals	K	Kicks	D	Disposals	T	Tackles
B	Behinds	H	Handballs	M	Marks

Season	Team	No.	Games	Totals							Averages (per game)							Votes
Season	Team	No.	Games	G	B	K	H	D	M	T	G	B	K	H	D	M	T	Votes
2021	Brisbane Lions	22	2	0	0	12	3	15	3	4	0.0	0.0	6.0	1.5	7.5	1.5	2.0	0
2022	Brisbane Lions	22	5	0	0	20	5	25	4	6	0.0	0.0	4.0	1.0	5.0	0.8	1.2	0
2023	Brisbane Lions	22	3	2	0	34	6	40	13	5	0.7	0.0	11.3	2.0	13.3	4.3	1.7	0
2024	Brisbane Lions	22	6	2	2	45	17	62	18	10	0.3	0.3	7.5	2.8	10.3	3.0	1.7	0
2025	Melbourne	30	18	8	10	71	45	116	36	24	0.4	0.6	3.9	2.5	6.4	2.0	1.3	0
2026	Melbourne	30	24	26	16	184	124	308	62	55	1.1	0.7	7.7	5.2	12.8	2.6	2.3	0
Career			58	38	28	366	200	566	136	104	0.7	0.5	6.3	3.4	9.8	2.3	1.8	0
