= Jack House (footballer) =

Australian rules footballer

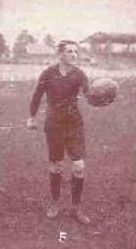

Personal information
- Full name: Jack House
- Born: 21 March 1888
- Died: 12 January 1967 (aged 78)
- Original team: Golden Point
- Position: Forward

Playing career^{1}
Years	Club	Games (Goals)
1919–23	Melbourne	56 (31)
- ^{1} Playing statistics correct to the end of 1923.

Jack House (21 March 1888 – 12 January 1967) was an Australian rules footballer who played with Melbourne in the Victorian Football League (VFL).
