= Reg Kent (footballer) =

Australian rules footballer (1943–2021)

Personal information
- Full name: Reg Kent
- Born: 21 November 1943
- Died: 17 November 2021 (aged 77)
- Original team: Keysborough
- Height: 183 cm (6 ft 0 in)
- Weight: 73 kg (161 lb)

Playing career^{1}
Years	Club	Games (Goals)
1960–62	Footscray	8 (4)
- ^{1} Playing statistics correct to the end of 1962.

Reg Kent (21 November 1943 – 17 November 2021) was an Australian rules footballer who played with Footscray in the Victorian Football League (VFL).

After he left the VFL, Kent became a journeyman, spending time with East Ballarat in the Ballarat Football League and winning the goalkicking on three occasions. He later played for South Warrnambool and topped the Hampden Football League goalkicking twice. While playing for Geelong West he topped the Geelong & District Football League goalkicking in 1978.
