= Peter Kiel =

Australian rules footballer, born 1958

Personal information
- Born: 2 October 1958 (age 68)
- Original team: Golden Point (Ballarat FL)

Playing career^{1}
Years	Club	Games (Goals)
1982–1986	St Kilda	80 (29)
1987	Melbourne	1 (0)
Total		81 (29)
- ^{1} Playing statistics correct to the end of 1987.

Career highlights
- St Kilda Best and Fairest 1982

Peter Kiel (born 2 October 1958) is a former Australian rules footballer who played in the Victorian Football League (VFL). He played for St Kilda as a utility. Kiel won the club's best and fairest award in his first year, but never quite recaptured the same form. Later in his career he was given tagging roles.
