= Anthony Walsh =

Anthony Walsh may refer to:

- Anthony Walsh (cyclist), cyclist from New Zealand
- Anthony Walsh (criminologist) (born 1941), American criminologist

== See also ==
- Tony Walsh (disambiguation)
