= Tony Walsh =

Tony Walsh may refer to:

- Tony Walsh (footballer) (1928–1984), Australian rules footballer
- Tony Walsh (poet) (born 1965), English poet, performer and writer
- Tony Walsh (priest) (born 1954), Irish Roman Catholic priest convicted of child sexual abuse

== See also ==
- Anthony Walsh (disambiguation)
