= Brian Clegg =

Brian Clegg may refer to:

- Brian Clegg (footballer) (born 1930), Australian rules footballer
- Brian Clegg (writer) (born 1955), British author and popular science writer
