= Daryl Cunningham =

Australian rules footballer (born 1960)

Personal information
- Full name: Daryl R. Cunningham
- Born: 25 November 1960 (age 65)
- Original team: Golden Point
- Height: 174 cm (5 ft 9 in)
- Weight: 75 kg (165 lb)

Playing career^{1}
Years	Club	Games (Goals)
1983–1986	St Kilda	34 (29)
1987	Essendon	7 (5)
Total		41 (34)
- ^{1} Playing statistics correct to the end of 1987.

Daryl Cunningham (born 25 November 1960) is a former Australian rules footballer who played with St Kilda and Essendon in the Victorian Football League (VFL).

Cunningham, a utility, came from Ballarat Football League club Golden Point. He played 15 games for St Kilda in the 1983 VFL season and kicked 21 goals, including five in a win over Richmond at Waverley Park. At that year's Grand Final Sprint he finished third. Over the next three seasons he added a further 19 games, then made his way to Essendon, where he made seven appearances in 1987.

From 1988 to 1992, Cunningham was captain-coach of Maffra in the Latrobe Valley Football League. He was best and fairest in his first season and steered Maffra to the 1989 Grand Final, which they lost to Leongatha by just two points.

His elder brother, Geoff Cunningham, also played for St Kilda.
