= Jim Veal =

Australian rules footballer, born 1901

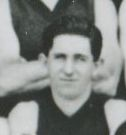

Personal information
- Full name: Jim Veal
- Born: 13 September 1901
- Died: 5 May 1965 (aged 63)
- Original team: Golden Point
- Position: Rover

Playing career^{1}
Years	Club	Games (Goals)
1926–27	Melbourne	4 (1)
- ^{1} Playing statistics correct to the end of 1927.

Jim Veal (13 September 1901 – 5 May 1965) was an Australian rules footballer who played with Melbourne in the Victorian Football League (VFL).
