= Redan Football Club =

Redan

Names
- Full name: Redan Football Netball Club
- Nickname(s): Lions

Club details
- Founded: 1871; 154 years ago
- Colours
- Competition: Ballarat Football League
- Premierships: (11): 1946, 1952, 1975, 1976, 1977, 2002, 2003, 2006, 2007, 2009, 2011
- Ground(s): City Oval (Seniors), Western Oval (Juniors, Female Football)

Uniforms
Home

Other information
- Official website: redanfnc.com.au

The Redan Football Netball Club (nicknamed the Lions) is an Australian rules football and netball club located in the city of Ballarat, Victoria. The football team currently competes in the Ballarat Football League.

== History ==
The first Redan game was reported in The Ballarat Star Saturday September 2, 1871 against the Ballarat Football Club. The Redan team was made up from miners from the Band of Hope mine and their average weight was 14 Stone (90 kg). The Star reported that the Redan team were everywhere, kicking and tripping regardless of the consequences.

Redan has a history of 59 Premierships including 11 Senior Football Premierships and was named the Victorian Country Football League Most Disciplined Club in 2004 & 2005.

Redan players have also won the Henderson Medal (Ballarat Football League's best player award) on 14 occasions with two players, Michael Smith (1993 & 1994) and Jarrod Edwards (2006, 2007, 2008 and 2009) winning the award in consecutive years. Edwards is the first player in BFL history to win four consecutive Henderson Medals.

The club also has four winners of the Tony Lockett Medal, for the leading goalscorer in the Ballarat Football League. Redan currently play their home matches at City Oval in Ballarat and play in a predominantly maroon strip with a maroon top band and a lion logo on the chest.

Former Adelaide Crows coach, the late Phil Walsh, played for Redan prior to be being recruited by Collingwood.

== Football Premierships ==
Senior Football

- Ballarat Football League
  - 1946 - Redan: d Maryborough
  - 1952 - Redan: (undefeated) d Ballarat
  - 1975 - Redan:
  - 1976 - Redan:
  - 1977 - Redan:
  - 2002 - Redan: d Sunbury
  - 2003 - Redan: d Sunbury
  - 2006 - Redan: d East Point
  - 2007 - Redan: d Sunbury
  - 2009 - Redan: d East Point
  - 2011 - Redan: d Sunbury

== League Best & Fairest Winners ==
Senior Football

- Ballarat Football League
  - Ballarat Courier Gold Medal
    - 1946 - Stan Webb
    - 1949 - W.Ebery
    - 1951 - Keith Rawle
- Ballarat Football League
  - Henderson Medal
    - 1955 - Graham Willey
    - 1957 - Bill McKenzie
    - 1976 - David Jenkins
    - 1981 - Greg Packham
    - 1992 - Michael Phyland
    - 1993 & 1994 - Michael Smith
    - 2006 to 2009 - Jarrod Edwards
    - 2017 - Nathan Horbury

== League Goal Kicking Winners ==
Senior Football

- Ballarat Football League - Tony Lockett Medal (from 1988 onwards)
  - 1952 - Bill Wells (73 goals)
  - 1953 - Bill Wells (116)
  - 1975 - D.Atkinson (67)
  - 1982 - G.Cahir (84)
  - 2023 - Izaac Grant (55)

== Bibliography ==
- History of Football in the Ballarat District by John Stoward - ISBN 978-0-9805929-0-0
