= Lance Behan =

Australian rules footballer

Personal information
- Full name: Lance Behan
- Born: 19 October 1942
- Original team: City-South
- Height: 193 cm (6 ft 4 in)
- Weight: 74 kg (163 lb)

Playing career^{1}
Years	Club	Games (Goals)
1962–1963	Richmond	10 (0)
1965	Fitzroy	4 (2)
Total		14 (2)
- ^{1} Playing statistics correct to the end of 1965.

Lance Behan (born 19 October 1942) is a former Australian rules footballer who played with Richmond and Fitzroy in the Victorian Football League (VFL).

Originally from Tasmania, Behan was cleared to Richmond in 1962.

He played two seasons with Richmond and then joined East Ballarat.

A follower, Behan won the Ballarat Football League's best and fairest award in 1964. He played briefly for Fitzroy in 1965, before returning to East Ballarat.
