= EBFC =

EBFC may refer to:

- Eastbourne Borough F.C.
- East Ballarat Football Club
- East Belfast F.C.
- East Bengal F.C.
- Erith & Belvedere F.C.
