= Keenan Reynolds =

Keenan Reynolds may refer to:

- Keenan Reynolds (American football), American football wide receiver
- Keenan Reynolds (Australian footballer), former Australian Rules football player
