= Geoff Cunningham =

Australian rules footballer (born 1959)

Geoffrey Cunningham

Personal information
- Nickname: Joffa
- Born: 7 January 1959 (age 67); Ballarat, Victoria
- Original team: Golden Point (BFL)
- Height: 183 cm (6 ft 0 in)
- Weight: 83 kg (183 lb)
- Position: Wing/half back flank

Playing career^{1}
Years	Club	Games (Goals)
1977–1989	St Kilda	224 (58)
- ^{1} Playing statistics correct to the end of 1989.

Geoff Cunningham (born 7 January 1959) is a former Australian rules footballer who played for St Kilda in the Victorian Football League (VFL).

== Career ==
=== Early days ===
Cunningham attended St Paul's Technical School in Ballarat and played for Golden Point in the Ballarat Football League, where he was recruited by St Kilda. After making his debut in 1977 on match permits, Cunningham was given a clearance to play the 1978 VFL season. Originally wearing number 25 for St Kilda, he was asked to give it up for former Carlton great, Alex Jesaulenko, who had left the Blues in 1980 – after coaching the 1979 premiership – to captain-coach the Saints. Cunningham was handed the number 5 guernsey and made it his own for the next decade.

=== Honours ===
Cunningham played during an era of little club success, which included St Kilda earning four successive wooden spoons from 1983 until 1986. However, the tough wingman was a rare shining light. His rivalry with the young Swan, David Rhys-Jones, was highly anticipated in the days of one-on-one match-ups. With champion Trevor Barker regularly missing games through chronic injury, Cunningham was often the only Saint selected to play for Victoria. Debuting in 1982, Cunningham played eight State of Origin games against South Australia and Western Australia. Cunningham, perhaps surprisingly, never won a club best and fairest award.

=== Family ===
Cunningham was joined by his younger brother, Daryl, (Fader) at St Kilda in 1983. The two were physically confronting together against opposition sides and proved intimidating. Often when one was in a scuffle, the other was close behind in support. Daryl was axed after four seasons and found his way to Essendon after Kevin Sheedy invited him down or pre-season when spotted him watching a practice match involving Essendon and St Kilda.

=== Final days ===
Cunningham's last game was in Round 12, 1989 against Hawthorn at a packed Moorabbin. It coincided with coach and legend, Darrel Baldock's decision to step aside after battling health problems. Cunningham's teammate, Ken Sheldon, was geared to take over the coaching reins with a new game plan. Aged 31 for the next season, Cunningham decided to retire after 224 games. Cunningham is one of only four VFL/AFL players, along with former teammate Trevor Barker, to have played 200 games without experiencing a final. Two seasons later St Kilda participated in its first final series since 1973. He would go on to coach Traralgon in the Latrobe Valley to successive premierships, and was the club's senior coach in 1996, the first of its two seasons in the Victorian Football League. Cunningham now lives in Brisbane.
