= Ballarat Football League =

Australian rules football competition

- Formerly: Ballarat Football Association (1893-1907)
- Sport: Australian rules football
- Founded: 1893; 133 years ago
- First season: 1893
- CEO: Shane Anwyl
- COO: Gemma Murphy
- President: Adrian Bettio
- No. of teams: 11
- Country: Australia
- Venues: City Oval, Ballarat, Victoria.
- Most recent champion: Ballarat (2026)
- Most titles: Ballarat (20 premierships)
- Sponsor: McDonald's
- Website: http://www.bfnl.com.au

The Ballarat Football League (BFL) is an Australian rules football competition that operates in the Ballarat region of Victoria.

The competition formed in 1893 as the Ballarat Football Association and was renamed Ballarat Football League in 1908 and was briefly known as the Ballarat-Wimmera Football League between 1934 and 1936.

== History ==
In 1880, a Ballarat and Western Districts Football Association was formed, but it appears no teams were entered or a draw was made up.

Between 1883 and 1892, there was an unofficial Ballarat / Western Districts football competition, with local Ballarat papers recording a list of premierships teams during this period.

The Ballarat Football Association (BFA) was established in 1893 with three member clubs: Ballarat, South Ballarat, and Ballarat Imperial. The latter was the dominant club in the BFA, winning the first premiership in 1893 and eleven premierships between 1893 and 1906. In 1908, the BFA changed its name to the Ballarat Football League (BFL) and Golden Point Football Club joined the competition. Maryborough and Ararat joined in 1924, followed by Daylesford and Bacchus Marsh several years later.

The BFL briefly amalgamated with the four clubs of Wimmera Football League from 1934 to 1936, when it was known as the Ballarat-Wimmera Football League.

The league was restructured into six teams in 1938 when it merged with the Ballarat District Football League, with several club mergers taking place. Ballarat Imperials FC then merged with the East Ballarat FC and played as Ballarat Imperials, finishing runner up to Sebastopol. Ballarat FC and North Ballarat FC also merged in 1938, to represent the "Lake Ward" of the new football competition.

Sebastopol played in the Clunes Football Association in 1939 and Ballarat CYMS teams pulled out of the Ballarat FL in 1939. The Ballarat Imperials went into recess just prior to the start of the 1939 Ballarat District Football League season.

World War II brought Redan Football Club and the RAAF and Army teams into the league.

The Henderson Medal is the league's seasonal best and fairest award. It was established in 1954 in honour of W. L. Henderson, who served as President from 1943 to 1959.

The BFL is now known as the Ballarat Football Netball League (BNFL), and consists of eleven football netball clubs and nine junior football netball clubs. In 2023, the Herald Sun dubbed North Ballarat Football Club "country footy's most dominant club over the last several decades"; the club had played in the Victorian Football League and the Bendigo Football Netball League before rejoining the BNFL in 2006.

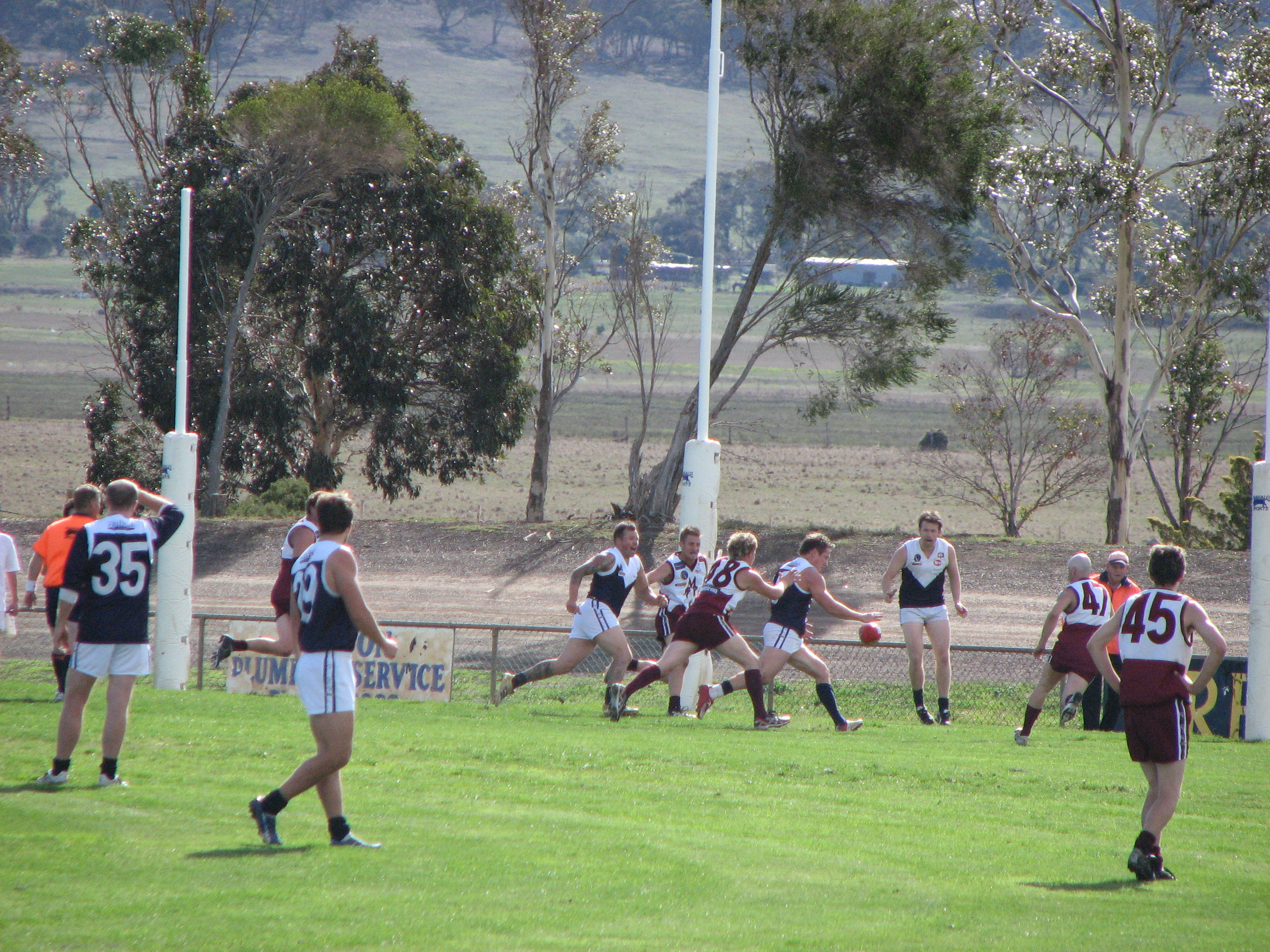
BFL reserves match in Melton

Competition Timeline

- 1880 - Ballarat and Western Districts Football Association
- 1883 - 1892: Unofficial Ballarat / Western Districts Football Competition
- 1893 - 1907: Ballarat Football Association
- 1908 - 1914: Ballarat Football League
- 1915 - 1918: In recess due to World War One
- 1919 - 1933: Ballarat Football League
- 1934 - 1936: Ballarat - Wimmera Football League
- 1937 - Ballarat Football League
- 1938 - 1940: Ballarat District Football League
- 1941: In recess due to World War Two
- 1942 - 2019: Ballarat Football League
- 2020: In recess due to COVID-19
- 2021 - 2024: Ballarat Football League

== Overview ==
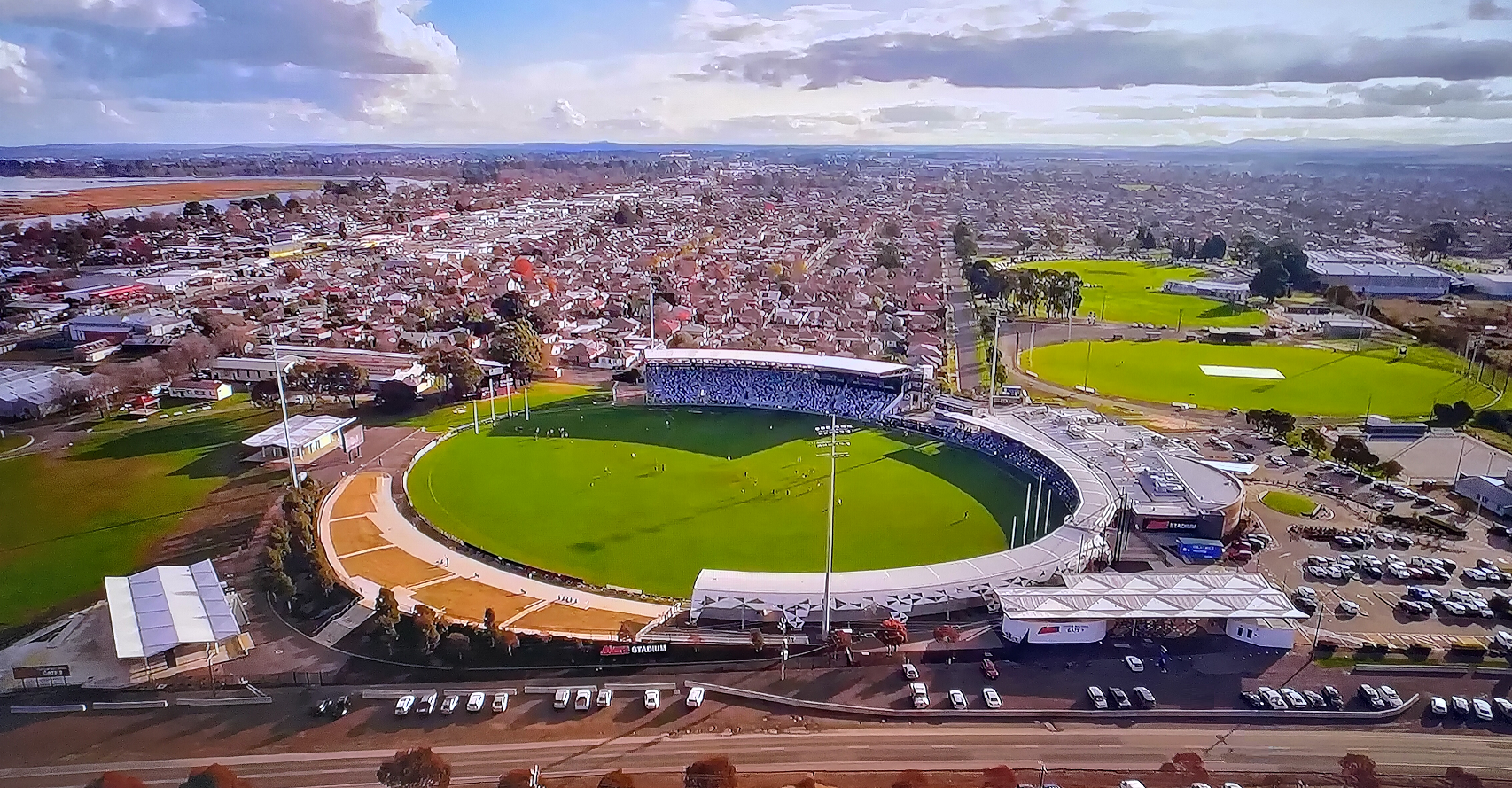
Mars Stadium Ballarat.(Winter_2022)

The league features 11 senior clubs. The BFL is a strong league for grass roots football with 9 junior clubs consisting of 63 teams from U/10 through to U/16.5 (Ballarat, Bacchus Marsh, Darley, East Ballarat, Lake Wendouree, Mount Clear, North Ballarat, Redan and Sebastopol).

The Ballarat Football League season normally commences in early April with the regular season matches finishing in late August.

Upon Daylesford's withdrawal from the competition at the end of the 2005 season competing clubs played the opposition clubs twice in the regular season, once at home, once away. This reverted upon North City's admission to the competition in 2008.

The finals series is conducted in September with the Grand Final to decide the premiers for season having been historically held at the Ballarat City and Eastern Ovals. The match attracts crowds of 5000 to 9000 people, with notable attendances of 14602 at the Ballarat City Oval and 8,800 at the Eastern Oval for the 1949 and 1977 Grand Finals respectively.

In 2017, the BFL announced that from 2017 the Grand Final would be played at Mars Stadium with other finals series games remaining at the Eastern and City Ovals.

== Governance ==
The management of the BFNL is overseen by an independent board of directors. The 2024 chairman is Adrian Bettio.

In 2024, the operations manager is Gemma Murphy, while the general manager is Shane Anwyl, along with two other staff members.

== Current clubs ==
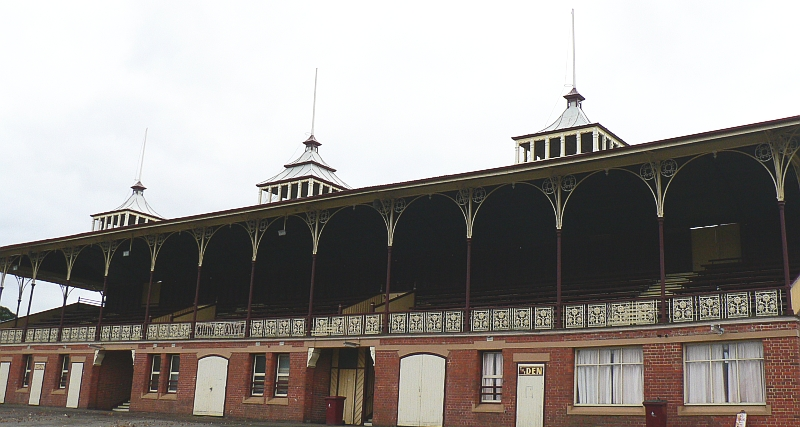
Ballarat City Oval Grandstand

Locations of the 2025 BFL clubs. Red clubs field senior teams, black clubs only field juniors. Carisbrook play 57km north of Ballarat.

Club	Colours	Nickname	Home Ground	Former League	Est.	Years in BFNL	BFL Senior Premierships	
Club	Colours	Nickname	Home Ground	Former League	Est.	Years in BFNL	Total	Years
Bacchus Marsh		Cobras	Maddingley Park, Maddingley	–	1979	1979-	1	2016
Ballarat		Swans	Alfredton Recreation Reserve, Alfredton	VFA	1860	1893-	20	1897, 1898, 1908, 1923, 1928, 1930, 1932, 1933, 1940, 1942, 1943, 1944, 1951, 1954, 1955, 1962, 1971, 1988, 2008, 2026
Darley		Devils	Darley Park, Darley	RDFNL	1919	1997-	4	2015, 2017, 2023, 2025
East Point		Kangaroos	Eastern Oval, Ballarat East	–	2001	2001-	2	2018, 2019
Gisborne		Bulldogs	Gardiner Reserve, Gisborne	BFNL	1879	2027-	0	-
Lake Wendouree		Lakers	C.E. Brown Reserve, Wendouree	–	1994	1995-	1	2010
Melton		Bloods	MacPherson Park, Harkness	RDFNL	1879	1997-	5	2000, 2001, 2005, 2022, 2024
North Ballarat		Roosters	Eureka Stadium, Wendouree	VFL	1882	1951	17	1963, 1970, 1973, 1978, 1979, 1982, 1983, 1984, 1985, 1986, 1991, 1992, 1994, 1995, 1996 (Note: As North Ballarat); 2013, 2014 (Note: As North Ballarat City)
Redan		Lions	City Oval, Lake Wendouree	–	1871	1943-	11	1946, 1952, 1975, 1976, 1977, 2002, 2003, 2006, 2007, 2009, 2011
Sebastopol		Burras	Marty Busch Reserve, Sebastopol	BFA, CDFL, BBMDFL	1893	1893-1895, 1938, 1940, 1978-	0	-
Sunbury		Lions	Clarke Oval, Sunbury	RDFNL	1879	1997-	5	1997, 1998, 1999, 2004, 2012

Notes

*Won in the Ballarat FL B-grade/District League competition, which ran separately from the A-Grade competition

=== BFL Women's ===
Club	Colours	Nickname	Home Ground	Former League	Est.	Years in BFNL	BFL Senior Premierships	
Club	Colours	Nickname	Home Ground	Former League	Est.	Years in BFNL	Total	Years
Bacchus Marsh		Cobras	Maddingley Park, Maddingley	VWFL	1979	1979-	0	-
Ballarat		Swans	Alfredton Recreation Reserve, Alfredton	VFA	1860	2026-	0	-
Carisbrook		Redbacks	Carisbrook Recreation Reserve, Carisbrook	–	c.1900s	2023-	0	-
Darley		Devils	Darley Park, Darley	–	1919	1997-	3	2023, 2024, 2025
East Point		Dragons	Eastern Oval, Ballarat East	–	2001	2001-	0	-
Lake Wendouree		Lakers	C.E. Brown Reserve, Wendouree	–	1994	1995-	0	-
Redan		Lions	City Oval, Lake Wendouree	–	1871	1943-	1	2022

=== Junior-only clubs ===
Club	Colours	Nickname	Home Ground	Est.	Years in BFNL
Southern		Mounties	Mount Clear Recreation Reserve, Mount Clear	1997	1997-
Woady Yaloak		Warriors	Woady Yaloak Recreation Reserve, Smythesdale	2019	2019-

== Former clubs ==
Club	Colours	Nickname	Home Ground	Former League	Est.	Years in BFNL	BFL Senior Premierships		Fate
Club	Colours	Nickname	Home Ground	Former League	Est.	Years in BFNL	Total	Years	Fate
Ararat		Rats	Alexandra Oval, Ararat	WDFL	1871	1924-1928, 1934-1936	0	-	Recess in 1929. Moved to Wimmera FNL in 1930 and 1937.
Bacchus Marsh		Tigers	Maddingley Park, Maddingley	WBMFA	1881	1929-1930	0	-	Moved to Geelong Junior FA in 1931
Ballarat CYMS			City Oval, Lake Wendouree	–	c. 1894	1938	0	-	Folded prior to 1939 season
Ballarat Imperial		Imps		VFA	1876	1893-1938	16	1893, 1894, 1895, 1896, 1899, 1900, 1901, 1902, 1903, 1905, 1906, 1922, 1929, 1935, 1936, 1937	Entered recess in 1939, re-formed in Ballarat FL B Grade in 1948
Ballarat Storm		Storm	Alfredton Recreation Reserve, Alfredton	–	2017	2017-2024	Juniors only		Integrated with Ballarat Swans from 2025.
Beaufort		Cats	Goldfields Recreation Reserve, Beaufort	LFL	1880s	1966-1993	1	1969	Moved to Central Highlands FL following 1993 season
Daylesford		Demons	Victoria Park, Daylesford	KDFA, CDFL	1919	1929-1931, 1952-2005	1	1961	Moved to Midland FL in 1932. Moved to Central Highlands FL following 2005 season
East Ballarat		Bulldogs	Eastern Oval, Ballarat East	BDFA	1885	1945-2000	6	1949, 1950, 1964, 1989, 1990, 1993	Merged with Ballarat Imperials in 1938, then later merged with Golden Point to form East Point following 2000 season
Geelong West		Roosters	West Oval, North Geelong	GDFNL	1878	1946-1962	4	1956, 1957, 1958, 1959	Moved to Victorian Football Association following 1962 season
Golden Point		Kangaroos	Eastern Oval, Ballarat East	–	1902	1905-2000	15	1910, 1914, 1919, 1920, 1921, 1939, 1945, 1947, 1948, 1953, 1966, 1967, 1980, 1981, 1987	Merged with East Ballarat to form East Point following 2000 season
Horsham		Demons	Horsham City Oval, Horsham	WDFL	1892	1934–1936	0	-	Moved to Wimmera FNL following 1936 season
Maddingley		Spiders	Maddingley Park, Maddingley	BBMDFL	1909	1978	0	-	Merged with Bacchus Marsh following 1978 season
Maryborough		Magpies	Princes Park, Maryborough	BFL	1872	1924-1928, 1931, 1946-1991	9	1924, 1925, 1927, 1931, 1960, 1965, 1968, 1972, 1974	Recess in 1929-30. Moved to Bendigo FL following 1931 and 1991 season
Melton Centrals		Blues	Arnolds Creek Recreation Reserve, Melton West	VWFL	1996	2021	0	-	Women's team only, in recess
Melton South		Panthers	Melton Recreation Reserve, Melton	RDFNL	1973	1997-2024	0	-	Returned to Riddell District FNL in 2025
RAAF				–	1940	1940–1945	0	-	Folded
Smeaton			Smeaton Football Ground, Smeaton	CDFL	1910s	1944–1945	0	-	Returned to Clunes DFL following 1945 season
South Ballarat				VFA	1877	1893–1939	9	1904, 1907, 1909, 1911, 1912, 1913, 1926, 1934, 1938	Merged with Sebastopol in 1940
South Sebastopol				–	1940	1940	0	-	Merger of South Ballarat & Sebastopol in 1940
Stawell		Redlegs	Central Park, Stawell	WDFL	1874	1934–1936	0	-	Moved to Wimmera FNL following 1936 season
St. Patrick's				–	1939	1939-1940	0	-	Folded
Warracknabeal		Lions	Anzac Park, Warracknabeal	WDFL	1870s	1934–1936	0	-	Moved to Wimmera FNL following 1936 season

Notes

*Won in the Ballarat FL B-grade/District League competition, which ran separately from the A-Grade competition

== Football Premiers ==
Seniors

- Ballarat / Western Districts
- 1883 South Ballarat
- 1884 Ballarat Imperial
- 1885 South
- 1886 South
- 1887 Ballarat
- 1888 Ballarat & South tied
- 1889 Ballarat
- 1890 Ballarat & Imperial tied
- 1891 Ballarat Imperial
- 1892 Ballarat Imperial
- Ballarat Football Association
- 1893 Ballarat Imperial
- 1894 Ballarat Imperial
- 1895 Ballarat Imperial
- 1896 Ballarat Imperial
- 1897 Ballarat
- 1898 Ballarat
- 1899 Ballarat Imperial
- 1900 Ballarat Imperial
- 1901 Ballarat Imperial
- 1902 Ballarat Imperial
- 1903 Ballarat Imperial
- 1904 South Ballarat
- 1905 Ballarat Imperial
- 1906 Ballarat Imperial
- 1907 South Ballarat
- Ballarat Football League
- 1908 Ballarat
- 1909 South Ballarat
- 1910 Golden Point
- 1911 South Ballarat
- 1912 South Ballarat
- 1913 South Ballarat
- 1914 Golden Point
- 1915–1918 In recess > WW1
- 1919 Golden Point
- 1920 Golden Point
- 1921 Golden Point
- 1922 Ballarat Imperial
- 1923 Ballarat
- 1924 Maryborough
- 1925 Maryborough
- 1926 South Ballarat
- 1927 Maryborough
- 1928 Ballarat
- 1929 Ballarat Imperial
- 1930 Ballarat
- 1931 Maryborough
- 1932 Ballarat
- 1933 Ballarat
- Ballarat - Wimmera Football League
- 1934 South Ballarat
- 1935 Ballarat Imperial
- 1936 Ballarat Imperial
- Ballarat Football League
- 1937 Ballarat Imperial (undefeated)
- 1938 South Ballarat
- 1939 Golden Point
- 1940 Ballarat
- 1941 In recess > WW2
- 1942 Ballarat
- 1943 Ballarat
- 1944 Ballarat
- 1945 Golden Point
- 1946 Redan
- 1947 Golden Point
- 1948 Golden Point
- 1949 East Ballarat
- 1950 East Ballarat
- 1951 Ballarat
- 1952 Redan
- 1953 Golden Point
- 1954 Ballarat
- 1955 Ballarat
- 1956 Geelong West
- 1957 Geelong West
- 1958 Geelong West
- 1959 Geelong West
- 1960 Maryborough
- 1961 Daylesford
- 1962 Ballarat
- 1963 North Ballarat
- 1964 East Ballarat
- 1965 Maryborough
- 1966 Golden Point
- 1967 Golden Point
- 1968 Maryborough
- 1969 Beaufort
- 1970 North Ballarat
- 1971 Ballarat
- 1972 Maryborough
- 1973 North Ballarat
- 1974 Maryborough
- 1975 Redan
- 1976 Redan
- 1977 Redan
- 1978 North Ballarat
- 1979 North Ballarat
- 1980 Golden Point
- 1981 Golden Point
- 1982 North Ballarat
- 1983 North Ballarat
- 1984 North Ballarat
- 1985 North Ballarat
- 1986 North Ballarat
- 1987 Golden Point
- 1988 Ballarat
- 1989 East Ballarat
- 1990 East Ballarat
- 1991 North Ballarat
- 1992 North Ballarat
- 1993 East Ballarat
- 1994 North Ballarat
- 1995 North Ballarat
- 1996 North Ballarat
- 1997 Sunbury
- 1998 Sunbury
- 1999 Sunbury
- 2000 Melton
- 2001 Melton
- 2002 Redan
- 2003 Redan
- 2004 Sunbury
- 2005 Melton
- 2006 Redan
- 2007 Redan
- 2008 Ballarat
- 2009 Redan
- 2010 Lake Wendouree
- 2011 Redan
- 2012 Sunbury
- 2013 North Ballarat City
- 2014 North Ballarat City
- 2015 Darley
- 2016 Bacchus Marsh
- 2017 Darley
- 2018 East Point
- 2019 East Point
- 2020 BFNL in recess > COVID-19
- 2021 Shortened year > COVID-19 Minor Premiers: Nth Ballarat
- 2022 Melton
- 2023 Darley
- 2024 Melton
- 2025 Darley
- 2026 Ballarat

Reserves

- No available records to post?

== Ballarat Football League B-Grade/District League ==
Between 1946 and 1972, the Ballarat Football League ran a B-grade competition alongside the main Ballarat Football League. This competition consisted of smaller clubs based in Ballarat and the small towns surrounding it. The B-grade competition ran separately from the "main" BFL, with no yearly promotion or relegation between the two competitions. In 1959, the competition changed its name to the Ballarat District Football League.

The BDFL wound up after the 1972 season, merging with the Bacchus Marsh Football League to form the Ballarat and Bacchus Marsh Football League.

=== Clubs ===
==== Final ====
Club	Colours	Nickname	Home Ground	Former League	Est.	Years in BFNL	BDFL Senior Premierships		Fate
Club	Colours	Nickname	Home Ground	Former League	Est.	Years in BFNL	Total	Years	Fate
Buninyong		Bombers	Buninyong Recreation Reserve, Buninyong	BFL	1920s	1948-1972	3	1960, 1968, 1970	Formed Ballarat & Bacchus Marsh FL following 1972 season
Dunnstown		Towners	Dunnstown Recreation Reserve, Dunnstown	DDFL	1894	1953-1972	4	1956, 1957, 1958, 1964	Formed Ballarat & Bacchus Marsh FL following 1972 season
Gordon		Eagles	Mount Egerton Recreation Reserve, Mount Egerton	DDFL	1890s	1962-1972	1	1966	Formed Ballarat & Bacchus Marsh FL following 1972 season
Meredith		Swans	Meredith Recreation Reserve, Meredith	EC	1890s	1953-1972	3	1959, 1961, 1962	Formed Ballarat & Bacchus Marsh FL following 1972 season
Sebastopol		Burras	Marty Busch Reserve, Sebastopol	BMFL	1893	1947-1972	7	1950, 1951, 1952, 1953, 1965, 1967, 1969	Formed Ballarat & Bacchus Marsh FL following 1972 season
Wendouree			C.E. Brown Reserve, Wendouree	Ballarat FL U/21s comp	1913	1946-1972	5	1947, 1949, 1963, 1971, 1972	Moved to Clunes FL in 1973

==== Former ====
Club	Colours	Nickname	Home Ground	Former League	Est.	Years in BDFL	BDFL Senior Premierships		Fate
Club	Colours	Nickname	Home Ground	Former League	Est.	Years in BDFL	Total	Years	Fate
Ballarat Imperial		Imps		BFL	1876	1948-1954	0	-	Folded after 1954 season
Ballarat YCW			White Flat Oval, Ballarat Central	–	1945	1946-1951	0	-	Folded. Junior club played until 1994 when they merged with Wendouree to form Lake Wendouree
Burrumbeet			Burrumbeet Lake Park, Burrumbeet	CDFL	1910s	1946-1951	0	-	Folded
Carngham	Light with dark sash		Carngham Recreation Reserve, Snake Valley	WPFL	1919	1962-1968	0	-	Merged with Linton to form Carngham Linton in Western Plains FL following 1968 season
Creswick		Wickers	Hammon Park, Creswick	CDFL	1900s	1946-1949	0	-	Moved to Clunes FL following 1949 season
East Ballarat seconds		Bulldogs	Eastern Oval, Ballarat East	BDFA	1885	1946	0	-	Moved to reserves competition in 1947
Elaine			Elaine Recreation Reserve, Elaine	EC	1919	1957-1968	0	-	Folded after 1968 season
Golden Point seconds		Kangaroos	Eastern Oval, Ballarat East	–	1902	1946	0	-	Moved to reserves competition in 1947
Korweinguboora			Korweinguboora Recreation Reserve, Spargo Creek	DDFL	1920s	1955-1956	0	-	Moved to Clunes FL following 1956 season
Langi Kal Kal			Langi Kal Kal Prison Oval, Langi Kal Kal	–	1950s	1957-1958	0	-	Moved to Lexton FL following 1958 season
Mount Clear			Mount Clear Recreation Reserve, Mount Clear	–	1946	1947-1958	2	1954, 1955	Folded after 1958 season
North City		Roosters	Eureka Stadium, Wendouree	–	1882	1946-1951	2	1946, 1948	Moved to Ballarat FL in 1952
Redan seconds		Lions	City Oval, Lake Wendouree	–	1871	1946	0	-	Moved to reserves competition in 1947
RSL				CFL	1946	1948-1949	0	-	Folded

=== Premierships by year ===
- 1946 North City
- 1947 Wendouree
- 1948 North City
- 1949 Wendouree
- 1950 Sebastopol
- 1951 Sebastopol
- 1952 Sebastopol
- 1953 Sebastopol
- 1954 Mount Clear
- 1955 Mount Clear
- 1956 Dunnstown
- 1957 Dunnstown
- 1958 Dunnstown
- 1959 Meredith
- 1960 Buninyong
- 1961 Meredith
- 1962 Meredith
- 1963 Wendouree
- 1964 Dunnstown
- 1965 Sebastopol
- 1966 Gordon
- 1967 Sebastopol
- 1968 Buninyong
- 1969 Sebastopol
- 1970 Buninyong
- 1971 Wendouree
- 1972 Wendouree

== Football Best & Fairest Awards ==
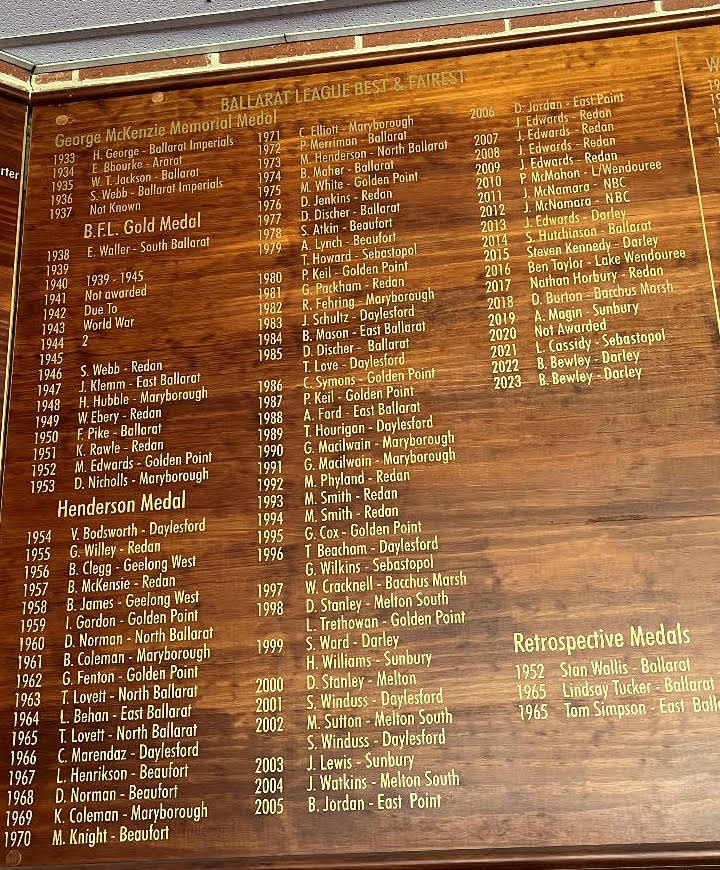
Ballarat FNL - Henderson Medal Winners

Seniors - W L Henderson Medal

The Ballarat FL's initial best and fairest award in senior football was the George McKenzie Memorial Medal, first awarded in 1933, which ran from 1933 to 1937. George McKenzie was captain of Ballarat Imperial Football Club when they won six consecutive premierships between 1891 and 1896 and were runners up in 1897 and 1898.

In 1938, the award was called the Angus Gold Cup, then the award was not awarded between 1939 and 1945, due to World War Two. The Ballarat FL Gold Medal ran from 1946 to 1953 and match day votes were allocated by the Ballarat Courier newspaper football journalists. The Henderson Medal is the league's current and seasonal best and fairest award and the medal was first named in honour of W. L. "Bill" Henderson in 1954, who served as President from 1943 to 1959. Henderson was a VCFL delegate for 30 years and is a life member of the VCFL and the Ballarat FNL.

In 2010, the Ballarat FNL awarded retrospective best and fairest medals to the following footballers, who originally polled the same number of votes as the winner, but finished second in the award, on the countback system - 1952: Stan Wallis, 1965: Tom Simpson and Lindsay Tucker.

It appears that the 1933 runner up, W.T. "Webber" Jackson, of the Ballarat Football Club does not appear on the official BFNL Honourboard as a co-winner and his club and family was not awarded a retrospective best and fairest medal in 2010.

Season	Player	Club	Votes
2027			
2026	Felix Henderson	Sebastopol	24
2025	Jake Egan	Sunbury	28
2024	Matt Johnston	East Point	26
2023	Brett Bewley	Darley	27
2022	Brett Bewley	Darley	29
2021	Lachlan Cassidy	Sebastopol	16
2020	BFNL in recess >	COVID-19	
2019	Alik Magin	Sunbury	25
2018	Daniel Burton	Bacchus Marsh	22
2017	Nathan Horbury	Redan	19
2016	Ben Taylor	Lake Wendouree	
2015	Steven Kennedy	Darley	24
2014	Shane Hutchinson	Ballarat	21
2013	Jake Edwards	Darley	
2012	Jason McNamara	North Ballarat	26
2011	Jason McNamara	North Ballarat	
2010	Paul McMahon	Lake Wendouree	17
2009	Jarrod Edwards	Redan	22
2008	Jarrod Edwards	Redan	
2007	Jarrod Edwards	Redan	
2006	Jarrod Edwards; Dan Jordan	Redan; East Point	
2005	Ben Jordan	East Point	
2004	Jason Watkins	Melton South	
2003	Justin Lewis	Sunbury	
2002	Matthew Sutton; Scott Winduss	Melton South; Daylesford	
2001	Scott Winduss	Daylesford	
2000	Darren Stanley	Melton	
1999	Shayne Ward; Haami Williams	Darley; Sunbury	
1998	Darren Stanley; Leigh Trethowan	Melton South; Golden Point	
1997	Wayne Cracknell	Bacchus Marsh	
1996	Tim Beacham; Glen Wilkins	Daylesford; Sebastopol	
1995	Greg Cox	Golden Point	
1994	Michael Smith	Redan	
1993	Michael Smith	Redan	
1992	Michael Phyland	Redan	
1991	Geoff MacIlwain	Maryborough	
1990	Geoff Macilwain	Maryborough	
1989	Terry Hourigan	Daylesford	
1988	Alister Ford	East Ballarat	20
1987	Peter Kiel	Golden Point	
1986	Carl Symons	Golden Pointv	
1985	Don Discher; Terry Love	Ballarat; Daylesford	
1984	Brendan Mason	East Ballarat	
1983	John Schultz	Daylesford	
1982	Rod Fehring	Maryborough	
1981	Greg Packham	Redan	
1980	Peter Kiel	Golden Point	
1979	Alan Lynch; Terry Howard	Beaufort; Sebastopol	
1978	Stuart Atkin	Beaufort	
1977	Don Discher	Ballarat	
1976	David Jenkins	Redan	
1975	Mark White	Golden Point	
1974	Brendan Mahar	Ballarat	
1973	Mal Henderson	North Ballarat	
1972	Peter Merriman	Ballarat	
1971	Colin Elliott	Maryborough	28
1970	Murray Knight	Beaufort	
1969	Kevin Coleman	Maryborough	
1968	David Norman	Beaufort	
1967	L. Henrikson	Beaufort	
1966	Charlie Marendaz	Daylesford	
1965	Ted Lovett	North Ballarat	
	Tom Simpson*	East Ballarat	
	Lindsay Tucker*	Ballarat	
1964	Lance Behan	East Ballarat	
1963	Ted Lovett	North Ballarat	
1962	Garry Fenton	Golden Pointv	
1961	Brian Coleman	Maryborough	
1960	David Norman	North Ballarat	
1959	Ian Gordon	Golden Point	
1958	Bill James	Geelong West	
1957	Bill McKenzie	Redan	
1956	Brian Clegg	Geelong West	
1955	Graham Willey	Redan	18
1954	Vic Bodsworth	Daylesford	23
W L Henderson Medal: 1954 to present day
1953	Don Nicholls	Maryborough	
1952	M Edwards &	Golden Point	
	Stan Wallis*	Ballarat	
1951	Keith Rawle	Redan	
1950	Frank Pike	Ballarat	
1949	W. Bill Ebery	Redan	
1948	H Hubble	Maryborough	
1947	J Klemm	East Ballarat	
1946	Stan Webb	Redan	
Ballarat Courier Gold Medal: 1946 to 1953
1945	Not awarded	World War 2	
1944	Not awarded	World War 2	
1943	Not awarded	World War 2	
1942	Not awarded	World War 2	
1941	BFL in recess:	World War 2	
1940	Not awarded	World War 2	
1939	Not awarded	World War 2	
1938	E Waller	South Ballarat	
The Angus Gold Cup: 1938
1937	? Unknown		
1936	Stan Webb	Imperial	26
1935	W.T. "Webber" Jackson	Ballarat	33
1934	E Ted Bourke	Ararat	20
1933	Herman George &	Imperial	13
	W.T. "Webber" Jackson *	Ballarat	(13)
George McKenzie Memorial Medal: 1933 to 1937
Season	Player	Club	Votes

== Leading BFL Goalkicker ==
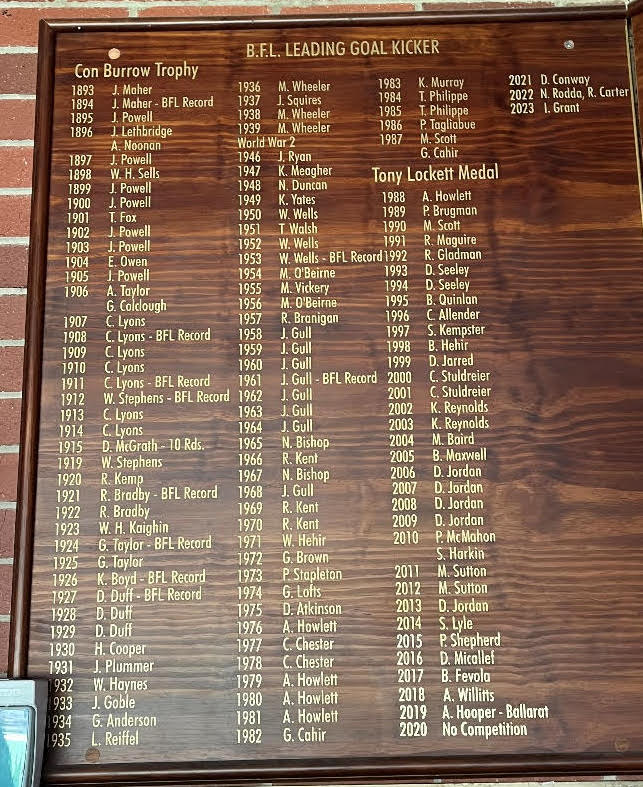
Ballarat Football League - Leading Goalkickers

The BFA leading goal kicking award was initially donated by the former publican of the Union Hotel, Ballarat between 1893 and 1903, Mr. Con Burrow

The BFNL leading goal kicking award was named the Tony Lockett Award in 1988, after the former North Ballarat player, who went onto kick 1360 goals in the AFL between 1983 and 2002, with St.Kilda and the Sydney Swans.

Seniors

	BFL Senior Football - Leading & Century Goalkickers				
Year	Winner	Club	Season Goals	Goals in finals	Total Goals
Ballarat Football Association
1890	Powell	Ballarat Imperial			
1891	Powell	Ballarat Imperial			
1892					
1893	J Maher	Ballarat Imperial			
1894	J Maher	Ballarat Imperial			
1895	J "Duxie" Powell	Ballarat Imperial			
1896	J Leathbridge &				
	A Noonan	Ballarat			
1897	J "Duxie" Powell	Ballarat Imperial			
1898	W H Sells	Ballarat Imperial			
1899	J "Duxie" Powell	Ballarat Imperial			
1900	J "Duxie" Powell	Ballarat Imperial			
1901	T Fox				
1902	J "Duxie" Powell	Ballarat Imperial			
1903	J "Duxie" Powell	Ballarat Imperial			
1904	E Owen				
1905	J "Duxie" Powell	Ballarat Imperial			
1906	G Colclough &	Ballarat			
	Ad Taylor	Ballarat Imperials			
1907	C "Sonner" Lyons	South Ballarat			
Ballarat Football League
1908	C "Sonner" Lyons	South Ballarat			
1909	C "Sonner" Lyons	South Ballarat			
1910	C "Sonner" Lyons	South Ballarat			
1911	C "Sonner" Lyons	South Ballarat			
1912	W "Billy" Stephens	Golden Point			47
1913	C "Sonner" Lyons	South Ballarat			
1914	C "Sonner" Lyons	South Ballarat			33
1915	Dave McGrath	South Ballarat			
1916-18	BFL in recess	WW1			
1919	W "Billy" Stephens	Golden Point			
1920	R Kemp	Ballarat			
1921	R "Bob" Bradby	Golden Point			48
1922	R "Bob" Bradby	Golden Point	34	2	36
1923	W Harry Kaighin	Ballarat			
1924	T George Taylor	Ararat	60	N/A	60
1925	T George Taylor	Ararat			58
1926	Jim Boyd	Ballarat	67		
1927	Dave Duff	Ballarat			113
1928	Dave Duff	Ballarat			91
1929	Dave Duff	Ballarat			96
1930	Harry Cooper	Ballarat	95		95
1931	Joe Plummer	Daylesford	80		80
1932	W Haynes	Golden Point	52		52
1933	J Goble	Ballarat Imperials	67		67
Ballarat Wimmera Football League: 1934 - 36
1934	Greg Anderson	Ballarat	72		72
1935	Lou Reiffel	Ballarat Imperial	71	10	81
1936	Max Wheeler	Ballarat	108		108
Ballarat Football League
1937	J Squires	Ballarat Imperials	43		43
Ballarat District Football League: 1938 - 1941
1938	Max Wheeler	North Ballarat	93		
1939	Max Wheeler	North Ballarat	93		
1940	?				
1941	BDFL in recess	WW2			
Ballarat Football League
1942	?				
1943	?				
1944	?				
1945	?				
1946	J Ryan	Maryborough	70		70
1947	K Meagher	Maryborough	46	6	52
1948	N Duncan	East Ballarat	87		87
1949	Ken Yates	Maryborough			61
1950	Bill Wells	Maryborough			73
1951	Tony Walsh	Geelong West	64		
1952	Bill Wells	Redan	73		73
1953	Bill Wells	Redan	110	6	116
1954	Mick O'Beirne	Geelong West	63		63
1955	M Vickery	Golden Point	66		66
1956	Mick O'Beirne	Geelong West	67	9	76
1957	Robert Branigan	Ballarat	44	3	47
1958	Jim Gull	Daylesford	89	9	98
1959	Jim Gull	Daylesford	91	7	98
1960	Jim Gull	Daylesford	77	10	87
1961	Jim Gull	Daylesford	147	12	159
1962	Jim Gull	Daylesford	90		90
1963	Jim Gull	Daylesford	71		71
1964	Jim Gull	Daylesford	74		74
1965	Noel Bishop	Maryborough	45	4	49
1966	Reg Kent	East Ballarat	93	3	96
1967	Noel Bishop	Maryborough	87	7	94
1968	Jim Gull	Daylesford	55	2	57
1969	Reg Kent	East Ballarat	118		118
1970	Reg Kent	East Ballarat	108	14	122
1971	Wayne Hehir	Daylesford	101		101
1972	Greg Brown	Ballarat	67	5	72
1973	P Stapleton	Beaufort	63	5	68
1974	Gary Lofts	Beaufort	66		66
1975	D Atkinson	Redan	67	4	71
1976	Anthony Howlett	Golden Point	103	13	116
1977	Colin Chester	East Ballarat	107	17	124
1978	Colin Chester	East Ballarat	126	24	150
1979	Anthony Howlett	Golden Point	78	16	94
1980	Anthony Howlett	Golden Point	82	11	93
1981	Anthony Howlett	Golden Point	64	1	65
1982	Gerard Gahir	Redan	79	9	88
1983	Ken Murray	North Ballarat	99	9	108
1984	Terry Philippe	Daylesford	106	7	113
1985	Terry Philippe	Daylesford	108		108
1986	Phil Tagliabue	Ballarat	84		84
1987	G Gahir	REdan	69		69
	Malcom Scott	Bacchus Marsh	69		69
1988	Anthony Howlett	Golden Point	72		72
1989	P Brugman	North Ballarat	59		59
1990	Malcom Scott	Bacchus Marsh	79		79
1991	R Maguire	Bacchus Marsh	82	2	84
1992	R Gladman	East Ballarat	61		61
1993	Dean Seeley	North Ballarat	106	7	113
1994	Dean Seeley	North Ballarat	130	6	136
1995	Brett Quinlan	North Ballarat	43	6	49
1996	Colin Allender	East Ballarat	70		70
1997	Shaun Kempster	Sunbury	86	20	106
1998	Brendan Hehir	Bacchus Marsh	74		74
1999	Daryl Jarred	Lake Wendouree	103	6	109
2000	Chris Stuldreier	Bacchus Marsh	93		93
2001	Chris Stuldreier	Bacchus Marsh	88		88
2002	Keenan Reynolds	Darley	71		71
2003	Keenan Reynolds	Darley	101		101
2004	Matthew Baird	Sunbury	78		78
2005	Brad Maxwell	Lake Wendouree	83	5	88
2006	Dan Jordan	East Point	130	18	148
2007	Dan Jordan	East Point	105	7	112
2008	Dan Jordan	East Point	78	18	96
2009	Dan Jordan	East Point	87	10	97
2010	Sam Harkin &	Ballarat	58	5	63
	Paul McMahon	Lake Wendouree	58	8	66
2011	Matthew Sutton	Melton South	54	3	57
2012	Matthew Sutton	Melton South	74	N/A	74
2013	Dan Jordan	East Point	97	3	100
2014	Shaun Lyle	Nth Ballarat City	71	10	81
2015	Peter Shepherd	Bacchus Marsh	51		51
2016	Derrick Micallef	Nth Ballarat City	64	1	65
2017	Brendan Fevola	Melton South	56		56
2018	Aaron Willitts	Baccus Marsh	51	0	51
2019	Andrew Hooper	Ballarat	41		41
2020	BFNL in recess	COVID-19			
2021	Dylan Conway	Melton South	35		35
2022	Ryan Carter &	Melton	56	4	60
	Nick Rodda	Darley	56	1	57
2023	Izaac Grant	Redan	54	1	55
2024	Braedan Kight	Melton	75	4	79
2025	Jake Sutton	Sunbury	68		
2026	Biggie Nyuon	Ballarat	59		
2027	?				
Year	Winner	Club	Season's Goals	Goals in Finals	Total Goals

== Netball ==
Ballarat Football Netball League (Netball)
- Sport: Netball
- Founded: Unknown
- No. of teams: 11 (Senior) 9 (Junior)
- Most recent champion: Darley (2025)
- Most titles: Unknown

There is very little Ballarat Football Netball League netball history, premierships, league best and fairest winners, etc available on the internet to reference back to for inclusion on this page at present.

The Ballarat FNL netball competition commenced in ?.

In 2024, there were 55 senior and 54 junior netball teams across all grades of the BFNL.

As of 2024, the BFNL netball section hosts the following netball competitions -

- A. Grade, B. Grade, C. Grade, D. Grade & E. Grade
- 19 & Under
- 17 & Under Seniors & 17 & Under Reserves
- 15 & Under Seniors & 15 & Under Reserves
- 13 & Under Seniors & 13 & Under Reserves
- 11 & Under Seniors & 11 & Under Reserves
- 9 & Under

=== Netball - Premiers ===
A Grade

- 1993: Sebastopol
- 1994: ?
- 1995: ?
- 1996: ?
- 1997: ?
- 1998: ?
- 1999: ?
- 2000: ?
- 2001: ?
- 2002: ?
- 2003: ?
- 2004: ?
- 2005: ?
- 2006: ?
- 2007: ?
- 2008: ?
- 2009: ?
- 2010: ?
- 2011: ?
- 2012: ?
- 2013: Sunbury 58 d North Ballarat 32
- 2014: Melton 48 d Sunbury 33
- 2015: North Ballarat 49 d Sunbury 42
- 2016: East Point 54 d North Ballarat 52
- 2017: Sunbury 44 d North Ballarat 38
- 2018: North Ballarat 50 d East Point 42
- 2019: North Ballarat 48 d East Point 46
- 2020: BFNL In Recess > COVID-19
- 2021: Shortened Year > COVID-19 Minor Premiers: North Ballarat
- 2022: North Ballarat 47 d Darley 34
- 2023: North Ballarat 40 d Darley 38
- 2024: Sunbury 44 d Darley 41
- 2025: Darley 51 d Sunbury 46
- 2026: Darley v North Ballarat

== Football Ladders ==
=== 1997 ===
Ballarat FL	Wins	Byes	Losses	Draws	For	Against	%	Pts	Final	Team	G	B	Pts	Team	G	B	Pts
Sunbury	16	0	2	0	2604	1174	221.81%	64	Elimination	Darley	19	14	128	Melton South	14	12	96
Melton	13	0	5	0	1878	1114	168.58%	52	Elimination	Lake Wendouree	17	18	120	Ballarat	9	16	70
Melton South	12	0	5	1	1833	1560	117.50%	50	Qualifying	Sunbury	17	14	116	Melton	9	11	65
Lake Wendouree	12	0	6	0	2028	1331	152.37%	48	1st Semi	Melton	15	17	107	Darley	8	15	63
Ballarat	12	0	6	0	1892	1265	149.57%	48	2nd Semi	Lake Wendouree	21	8	134	Sunbury	17	17	119
Darley	10	0	8	0	1869	1714	109.04%	40	Preliminary	Sunbury	14	12	96	Melton	9	11	65
Daylesford	9	0	8	1	1596	1472	108.42%	38	Grand	Sunbury	15	15	105	Lake Wendouree	13	16	94
Sebastopol	8	0	9	1	1433	1464	97.88%	34									
Bacchus Marsh	7	0	11	0	1786	1625	109.91%	28									
East Ballarat	5	0	13	0	1311	1815	72.23%	20									
Golden Point	2	0	15	1	1104	2118	52.12%	10									
Redan	0	0	18	0	655	3337	19.63%	0									

=== 1998 ===
Ballarat FL	Wins	Byes	Losses	Draws	For	Against	%	Pts	Final	Team	G	B	Pts	Team	G	B	Pts
Sunbury	16	0	2	0	2692	1084	248.34%	64	Elimination	Bacchus Marsh	19	15	129	Darley	10	13	73
Melton South	14	0	3	1	2445	1399	174.77%	58	Elimination	Melton	21	19	145	Lake Wendouree	15	13	103
Melton	14	0	4	0	2223	1188	187.12%	56	Qualifying	Sunbury	16	17	113	Melton South	15	14	104
Bacchus Marsh	13	0	5	0	2066	1199	172.31%	52	1st Semi	Bacchus Marsh	27	11	173	Melton South	8	6	54
Darley	12	0	5	1	2000	1307	153.02%	50	2nd Semi	Sunbury	17	7	109	Melton	14	21	105
Lake Wendouree	9	0	9	0	1963	1503	130.61%	36	Preliminary	Melton	12	17	89	Bacchus Marsh	11	11	77
East Ballarat	8	0	10	0	1895	1608	117.85%	32	Grand	Sunbury	17	9	111	Melton	12	7	79
Sebastopol	7	0	11	0	1563	1610	97.08%	28									
Ballarat	7	0	11	0	1542	1890	81.59%	28									
Golden Point	5	0	13	0	1531	1719	89.06%	20									
Daylesford	2	0	16	0	926	2657	34.85%	8									
Redan	0	0	18	0	375	4067	9.22%	0									

=== 1999 ===
Ballarat FL	Wins	Byes	Losses	Draws	For	Against	%	Pts	Final	Team	G	B	Pts	Team	G	B	Pts
Bacchus Marsh	14	0	4	0	0	0	#DIV/0!	56	Elimination	Lake Wendouree	20	16	136	Darley	10	8	68
Sunbury	14	0	4	0	0	0	#DIV/0!	56	Elimination	Melton	10	17	77	Golden Point	6	9	45
Darley	14	0	4	0	0	0	#DIV/0!	56	Qualifying	Sunbury	13	21	99	Bacchus Marsh	11	8	74
Melton	13	0	5	0	0	0	#DIV/0!	52	1st Semi	Bacchus Marsh	9	14	68	Lake Wendouree	10	4	64
Golden Point	13	0	5	0	0	0	#DIV/0!	52	2nd Semi	Sunbury	17	12	114	Melton	6	9	45
Lake Wendouree	13	0	5	0	0	0	#DIV/0!	52	Preliminary	Bacchus Marsh	18	17	125	Melton	6	9	45
East Ballarat	8	0	10	0	0	0	#DIV/0!	32	Grand	Sunbury	16	11	107	Bacchus Marsh	14	11	95
Melton South	7	0	11	0	0	0	#DIV/0!	28									
Sebastopol	6	0	11	1	0	0	#DIV/0!	26									
Ballarat	3	0	14	1	0	0	#DIV/0!	14									
Redan	1	0	17	0	0	0	#DIV/0!	4									
Daylesford	1	0	17	0	0	0	#DIV/0!	4									

=== 2000 ===
Ballarat FL	Wins	Byes	Losses	Draws	For	Against	%	Pts	Final	Team	G	B	Pts	Team	G	B	Pts
Darley	16	0	2	0	2376	1278	185.92%	64	Elimination	Sebastopol	19	17	131	Lake Wendouree	18	2	110
Sunbury	15	0	3	0	2575	1356	189.90%	60	Elimination	Melton	16	11	107	Melton South	9	6	60
Melton	15	0	3	0	2182	1286	169.67%	60	Qualifying	Darley	16	13	109	Sunbury	12	17	89
Lake Wendouree	14	0	4	0	2154	1292	166.72%	56	1st Semi	Sebastopol	14	15	99	Sunbury	13	8	86
Sebastopol	11	0	7	0	2029	1489	136.27%	44	2nd Semi	Melton	18	13	121	Darley	9	2	56
Melton South	11	0	7	0	1734	1611	107.64%	44	Preliminary	Sebastopol	14	9	93	Darley	11	5	71
Ballarat	7	0	11	0	1571	1571	100.00%	28	Grand	Melton	8	4	52	Sebastopol	6	8	44
Golden Point	7	0	11	0	1486	1824	81.47%	28									
Redan	5	0	13	0	1526	1624	93.97%	20									
Bacchus Marsh	5	0	13	0	1537	1843	83.40%	20									
East Ballarat	1	0	17	0	806	2695	29.91%	4									
Daylesford	1	0	17	0	834	2941	28.36%	4									

=== 2001 ===
Ballarat FL	Wins	Byes	Losses	Draws	For	Against	%	Pts	Final	Team	G	B	Pts	Team	G	B	Pts
Melton	13	2	3	0	1740	1157	150.39%	60	Elimination	Daylesford	19	15	129	Bacchus Marsh	9	3	57
Melton South	12	1	5	0	1428	1136	125.70%	52	Elimination	Darley	21	8	134	Sunbury	15	13	103
Bacchus Marsh	11	2	4	1	1717	1351	127.09%	54	Qualifying	Melton South	17	9	111	Melton	14	16	100
Sunbury	11	2	5	0	1586	1086	146.04%	52	1st Semi	Melton	4	10	34	Daylesford	2	2	14
Darley	12	1	5	0	1558	1273	122.39%	52	2nd Semi	Melton South	17	11	113	Darley	12	8	80
Daylesford	10	2	6	0	1561	1219	128.06%	48	Preliminary	Melton	16	10	106	Darley	12	7	79
Lake Wendouree	10	1	7	0	1538	1427	107.78%	44	Grand	Melton	25	15	165	Melton South	3	9	27
Ballarat	4	2	11	1	1075	1502	71.57%	26									
Redan	5	1	12	0	1195	1457	82.02%	24									
East Point	1	2	15	0	1008	2007	50.22%	12									
Sebastopol	0	2	16	0	1006	1797	55.98%	8									

=== 2002 ===
Ballarat FL	Wins	Byes	Losses	Draws	For	Against	%	Pts	Final	Team	G	B	Pts	Team	G	B	Pts
Sunbury	13	1	4	0	1886	1169	161.33%	56	Elimination	Darley	23	19	157	Daylesford	15	4	94
Melton South	13	1	4	0	1927	1212	158.99%	56	Elimination	Redan	17	15	117	Melton	7	13	55
Redan	12	2	4	0	1480	1106	133.82%	56	Qualifying	Sunbury	15	14	104	Melton South	13	11	89
Daylesford	12	1	5	0	1713	1254	136.60%	52	1st Semi	Darley	14	7	91	Melton South	4	9	33
Darley	11	2	5	0	1668	1413	118.05%	52	2nd Semi	Sunbury	12	8	80	Redan	9	10	64
Melton	9	2	7	0	1507	1451	103.86%	44	Preliminary	Redan	17	17	119	Darley	9	10	64
Sebastopol	7	2	9	0	1416	1687	83.94%	36	Grand	Redan	16	14	110	Sunbury	6	15	51
Bacchus Marsh	6	2	10	0	1519	1626	93.42%	32									
Lake Wendouree	3	2	13	0	1083	1579	68.59%	20									
Ballarat	3	1	14	0	1084	1837	59.01%	16									
East Point	1	2	15	0	953	1902	50.11%	12									

=== 2003 ===
Ballarat FL	Wins	Byes	Losses	Draws	For	Against	%	Pts	Final	Team	G	B	Pts	Team	G	B	Pts
Sunbury	16	1	1	0	2211	1022	216.34%	68	Elimination	Redan	17	9	111	Darley	12	15	87
Melton South	12	2	4	0	1937	1191	162.64%	56	Elimination	Daylesford	15	13	103	Lake Wendouree	11	13	79
Redan	12	2	4	0	1580	974	162.22%	56	Qualifying	Sunbury	7	19	61	Melton South	7	6	48
Lake Wendouree	12	2	4	0	1448	1127	128.48%	56	1st Semi	Darley	6	12	48	Melton South	5	7	37
Daylesford	11	2	5	0	1783	1109	160.78%	52	2nd Semi	Redan	10	7	67	Sunbury	7	13	55
Darley	11	2	5	0	1742	1230	141.63%	52	Preliminary	Sunbury	14	17	101	Daylesford	12	18	90
Ballarat	5	2	11	0	999	1665	60.00%	28	Grand	Redan	16	11	107	Sunbury	10	9	69
Melton	4	2	12	0	1317	1638	80.40%	24									
Sebastopol	3	1	14	0	1045	1802	57.99%	16									
East Point	2	1	15	0	1091	2090	52.20%	12									
Bacchus Marsh	2	1	15	0	1070	2375	45.05%	12									

=== 2004 ===
Ballarat FL	Wins	Byes	Losses	Draws	For	Against	%	Pts	Final	Team	G	B	Pts	Team	G	B	Pts
Sunbury	16	1	1	0	2114	1044	202.49%	68	Elimination	Darley	14	14	98	East Point	8	19	67
Redan	12	1	4	1	1662	958	173.49%	54	Elimination	Lake Wendouree	10	10	70	Daylesford	7	11	53
Darley	10	2	6	0	1586	1206	131.51%	48	Qualifying	Redan	18	10	118	Sunbury	11	13	79
Daylsford	10	2	6	0	1385	1101	125.79%	48	1st Semi	Sunbury	23	13	151	Lake Wendouree	14	10	94
Lake Wendouree	9	2	7	0	1238	1007	122.94%	44	2nd Semi	Redan	20	1	121	Darley	11	4	70
East Point	9	2	7	0	1183	1261	93.81%	44	Preliminary	Sunbury	10	9	69	Darley	7	4	46
Melton	9	1	7	1	1460	1255	116.33%	42	Grand	Sunbury	14	14	98	Redan	11	7	73
Melton South	6	2	10	0	1046	1284	81.46%	32									
Bacchus Marsh	5	1	12	0	1167	1852	63.01%	24									
Ballarat	3	2	13	0	989	1559	63.44%	20									
Sebastopol	0	2	16	0	641	1944	32.97%	8									

=== 2005 ===
Ballarat FL	Wins	Byes	Losses	Draws	For	Against	%	Pts	Final	Team	G	B	Pts	Team	G	B	Pts
Sunbury	15	2	0	1	2302	1146	200.87%	70	Elimination	Darley	12	7	79	Melton South	9	9	63
Redan	11	2	5	0	1581	1101	143.60%	52	Elimination	Melton	19	9	123	Lake Wendouree	9	14	68
Melton South	11	2	5	0	1657	1353	122.47%	52	Qualifying	Sunbury	17	5	107	Redan	11	13	79
Melton	10	2	6	0	1660	1284	129.28%	48	1st Semi	Redan	14	12	96	Darley	11	6	72
Lake Wendouree	10	2	6	0	1710	1338	127.80%	48	2nd Semi	Sunbury	18	12	120	Melton	13	13	91
Darley	10	2	6	0	1776	1459	121.73%	48	Preliminary	Melton	21	9	135	Redan	27	2	164
East Point	10	2	6	0	1764	1502	117.44%	48	Grand	Melton	16	19	115	Sunbury	12	12	84
Daylsford	5	2	10	1	1204	1339	89.92%	30									
Ballarat	2	2	14	0	1143	1728	66.15%	16									
Sebastopol	2	2	14	0	822	2194	37.47%	16									
Bacchus Marsh	1	2	15	0	1088	2263	48.08%	12									

=== 2006 ===
Ballarat FL	Wins	Byes	Losses	Draws	For	Against	%	Pts	Final	Team	G	B	Pts	Team	G	B	Pts
East Point	17	0	1	0	2736	1000	273.60%	68	Elimination	Darley	18	15	123	Sunbury	17	13	115
Redan	14	0	4	0	2192	1240	176.77%	56	Elimination	Ballarat	13	15	93	Melton	12	11	83
Melton	13	0	4	1	2181	1819	119.90%	54	Qualifying	Redan	21	10	136	East Point	19	19	133
Sunbury	11	0	7	0	2355	1660	141.87%	44	1st Semi	East Point	17	11	113	Ballarat	13	11	89
Darley	10	0	8	0	2008	1674	119.95%	40	2nd Semi	Redan	25	22	172	Darley	14	13	97
Ballarat	9	0	9	0	1837	1895	96.94%	36	Preliminary	East Point	27	2	164	Darley	21	9	135
Lake Wendouree	7	0	11	0	1567	1996	78.51%	28	Grand	Redan	20	17	137	E Point	17	16	118
Sebastopol	4	0	14	0	1450	2195	66.06%	16									
Melton South	3	0	14	1	1443	2356	61.25%	14									
Bacchus Marsh	1	0	17	0	1111	3045	36.49%	4									

=== 2007 ===
Ballarat FL	Wins	Byes	Losses	Draws	For	Against	%	Pts	Final	Team	G	B	Pts	Team	G	B	Pts
East Point	16	0	2	0	2132	1037	205.59%	64	Elimination	Redan	14	19	103	Melton	13	7	85
Sunbury	16	0	2	0	1903	991	192.03%	64	Elimination	Ballarat	14	19	103	Melton South	15	3	93
Redan	13	0	5	0	1883	1134	166.05%	52	Qualifying	Sunbury	14	10	94	East Point	12	11	83
Ballarat	12	0	5	1	1767	1111	159.05%	50	1st Semi	Ballarat	15	8	98	East Point	10	10	70
Melton South	10	0	7	1	1685	1670	100.90%	42	2nd Semi	Redan	14	17	101	Sunbury	13	9	87
Melton	8	0	10	0	1460	1757	83.10%	32	Preliminary	Sunbury	18	10	118	Ballarat	7	11	53
Lake Wendouree	5	0	13	0	1282	1919	66.81%	20	Grand	Redan	18	15	123	Sunbury	16	9	105
Darley	4	0	14	0	1200	1895	63.32%	16									
Sebastopol	3	0	15	0	1144	1874	61.05%	12									
Bacchus Marsh	2	0	16	0	1079	2147	50.26%	8									

=== 2008 ===
Ballarat FL	Wins	Byes	Losses	Draws	For	Against	%	Pts	Final	Team	G	B	Pts	Team	G	B	Pts
Darley	15	2	1	0	1713	1067	160.54%	68	Elimination	Lake Wendouree	14	12	96	Sunbury	10	9	69
East Point	12	2	4	0	1729	1180	146.53%	56	Elimination	Ballarat	18	16	124	Melton South	9	4	58
Sunbury	11	2	5	0	1334	1246	107.06%	52	Qualifying	Darley	16	11	107	East Point	11	10	76
Ballarat	9	2	7	0	1553	1105	140.54%	44	1st Semi	East Point	17	14	116	Lake Wendouree	13	11	89
Melton South	9	2	7	0	1620	1286	125.97%	44	2nd Semi	Darley	16	9	105	Ballarat	12	16	88
Lake Wendouree	8	2	8	0	1310	1186	110.46%	40	Preliminary	Ballarat	14	7	91	East Point	11	10	76
Redan	7	2	9	0	1479	1261	117.29%	36	Grand	Ballarat	13	7	85	Darley	10	20	80
Bacchus Marsh	6	2	10	0	1332	1814	73.43%	32									
Melton	6	2	10	0	1224	1729	70.79%	32									
North Ballarat City	4	2	12	0	1166	1596	73.06%	24									
Sebastopol	1	2	15	0	973	1963	49.57%	12									

=== 2009 ===
Ballarat FL	Wins	Byes	Losses	Draws	For	Against	%	Pts	Final	Team	G	B	Pts	Team	G	B	Pts
Redan	13	2	3	0	1737	1013	171.47%	60	Elimination	Lake Wendouree	12	13	85	Sunbury	8	6	54
Darley	13	2	3	0	1642	1055	155.64%	60	Elimination	East Point	7	7	49	Ballarat	5	8	38
East Point	13	2	3	0	1657	1249	132.67%	60	Qualifying	Redan	11	2	68	Darley	7	5	47
Lake Wendouree	12	2	4	0	1662	1160	143.28%	56	1st Semi	Lake Wendouree	12	13	85	Darley	8	5	53
Sunbury	11	2	5	0	1798	1167	154.07%	52	2nd Semi	East Point	16	5	101	Redan	14	11	95
Ballarat	9	2	7	0	1502	1147	130.95%	44	Preliminary	Redan	14	11	95	Lake Wendouree	11	9	75
Melton South	6	2	10	0	1456	1694	85.95%	32	Grand	Redan	13	13	91	East Point	6	12	48
North Ballarat City	4	2	12	0	1173	1646	71.26%	24									
Melton	4	2	12	0	1005	1668	60.25%	24									
Bacchus Marsh	2	2	14	0	1116	1836	60.78%	16									
Sebastopol	1	2	15	0	905	2018	44.85%	12									

=== 2010 ===
Ballarat FL	Wins	Byes	Losses	Draws	For	Against	%	Pts	Final	Team	G	B	Pts	Team	G	B	Pts
Sunbury	15	2	1	0	1735	884	196.27%	68	Elimination	Ballarat	9	14	68	East Point	6	11	47
Lake Wendouree	13	2	2	1	1523	1076	141.54%	62	Elimination	Redan	17	9	111	Darley	14	11	95
Ballarat	13	2	3	0	1885	877	214.94%	60	Qualifying	Lake Wendouree	16	9	105	Sunbury	12	12	84
Redan	12	2	3	1	1654	920	179.78%	58	1st Semi	Redan	9	11	65	Sunbury	8	9	57
Darley	8	2	8	0	1388	1305	106.36%	40	2nd Semi	Lake Wendouree	8	7	55	Ballarat	2	12	24
East Point	8	2	8	0	1387	1314	105.56%	40	Preliminary	Ballarat	14	14	98	Redan	7	13	55
Melton South	5	2	11	0	1184	1468	80.65%	28	Grand	Lake Wendouree	18	9	117	Ballarat	9	8	62
Melton	5	2	11	0	1091	1733	62.95%	28									
North Ballarat City	4	2	12	0	1025	1394	73.53%	24									
Sebastopol	2	2	14	0	907	1808	50.17%	16									
Bacchus Marsh	2	2	14	0	798	1798	44.38%	16									

=== 2011 ===
Ballarat FL	Wins	Byes	Losses	Draws	For	Against	%	Pts	Final	Team	G	B	Pts	Team	G	B	Pts
Sunbury	15	2	1	0	2021	909	222.33%	68	Elimination	Redan	16	13	109	Ballarat	10	7	67
Lake Wendouree	12	2	4	0	1544	1039	148.60%	56	Elimination	North Ballarat City	18	13	121	Melton South	8	6	54
North Ballarat City	11	2	5	0	1291	965	133.78%	52	Qualifying	Sunbury	13	12	90	Lake Wendouree	10	7	67
Redan	11	2	5	0	1669	1248	133.73%	52	1st Semi	North Ballarat City	13	14	92	Lake Wendouree	6	7	43
Melton South	10	2	6	0	1390	1459	95.27%	48	2nd Semi	Redan	18	19	127	Sunbury	13	8	86
Ballarat	9	2	7	0	1563	1148	136.15%	44	Preliminary	Sunbury	18	11	119	North Ballarat City	11	14	80
East Point	9	2	7	0	1366	1283	106.47%	44	Grand	Redan	17	12	114	Sunbury	17	10	112
Bacchus Marsh	5	2	11	0	1371	1412	97.10%	28									
Melton	3	2	13	0	1022	1715	59.59%	20									
Sebastopol	3	2	13	0	1022	1869	54.68%	20									
Darley	0	2	16	0	949	2161	43.91%	8									

=== 2012 ===
Ballarat FL	Wins	Byes	Losses	Draws	For	Against	%	Pts	Final	Team	G	B	Pts	Team	G	B	Pts
Redan	15	2	1	0	1619	982	164.87%	68	Elimination	East Point	17	17	119	Ballarat	13	13	91
Sunbury	13	2	3	0	1505	909	165.57%	60	Elimination	North Ballarat City	23	9	147	Darley	13	8	86
East Point	12	2	4	0	1773	1385	128.01%	56	Qualifying	Sunbury	13	18	96	Redan	8	13	61
Darley	11	2	5	0	1306	1109	117.76%	52	1st Semi	Redan	13	13	91	North Ballarat City	12	10	82
North Ballarat City	10	2	6	0	1323	846	156.38%	48	2nd Semi	Sunbury	19	16	130	East Point	8	13	61
Ballarat	9	2	7	0	1364	1247	109.38%	44	Preliminary	Redan	23	10	148	East Point	15	10	100
Melton South	6	2	10	0	1412	1412	100.00%	32	Grand	Sunbury	23	17	155	Redan	15	8	98
Bacchus Marsh	5	2	11	0	1079	1464	73.70%	28									
Lake Wendouree	3	2	13	0	959	1525	62.89%	20									
Melton	3	2	13	0	1052	1673	62.88%	20									
Sebastopol	1	2	15	0	947	1787	52.99%	12									

=== 2013 ===
Ballarat FL	Wins	Byes	Losses	Draws	For	Against	%	Pts	Final	Team	G	B	Pts	Team	G	B	Pts
North Ballarat City	15	2	1	0	1781	746	238.74%	68	Elimination	Sunbury	17	19	121	Ballarat	16	7	103
Redan	12	2	3	1	1557	1006	154.77%	58	Elimination	Darley	14	15	99	East Point	13	13	91
Sunbury	12	2	3	1	1656	1187	139.51%	58	Qualifying	Redan	11	12	78	North Ballarat City	5	7	37
East Point	12	2	4	0	1809	1312	137.88%	56	1st Semi	North Ballarat City	16	10	106	Darley	7	11	53
Darley	11	2	5	0	1570	1075	146.05%	52	2nd Semi	Sunbury	12	15	87	Redan	7	15	57
Ballarat	8	2	8	0	1255	1234	101.70%	40	Preliminary	North Ballarat City	20	13	133	Redan	9	9	63
Bacchus Marsh	6	2	10	0	1257	1372	91.62%	32	Grand	North Ballarat City	14	9	93	Sunbury	10	12	72
Melton South	5	2	11	0	1450	1717	84.45%	28									
Lake Wendouree	5	2	11	0	951	1405	67.69%	28									
Melton	1	2	15	0	1051	1932	54.40%	12									
Sebastopol	0	2	16	0	881	2232	39.47%	8									

=== 2014 ===
Ballarat FL	Wins	Byes	Losses	Draws	For	Against	%	Pts	Final	Team	G	B	Pts	Team	G	B	Pts
North Ballarat City	15	2	1	0	1798	810	221.98%	68	Elimination	Ballarat	23	13	151	Sunbury	11	11	77
Redan	13	2	3	0	1567	950	164.95%	60	Elimination	Darley	11	21	87	Lake Wendouree	9	13	67
Ballarat	12	2	4	0	1419	1008	140.77%	56	Qualifying	North Ballarat City	12	22	94	Redan	12	8	80
Darley	9	2	6	1	1491	1316	113.30%	46	1st Semi	Redan	20	11	131	Darley	9	18	72
Sunbury	8	2	8	0	1388	1319	105.23%	40	2nd Semi	North Ballarat City	19	16	130	Ballarat	9	13	67
Lake Wendouree	8	2	8	0	1234	1207	102.24%	40	Preliminary	Ballarat	21	11	137	Redan	12	7	79
East Point	8	2	8	0	1363	1346	101.26%	40	Grand	North Ballarat City	20	17	137	Ballarat	1	12	18
Bacchus Marsh	7	2	9	0	1274	1205	105.73%	36									
Melton	5	2	10	1	1164	1445	80.55%	30									
Melton South	2	2	14	0	1179	1645	71.67%	16									
Sebastopol	0	2	16	0	679	2305	29.46%	8									

=== 2015 ===
Ballarat FL	Wins	Byes	Losses	Draws	For	Against	%	Pts	Final	Team	G	B	Pts	Team	G	B	Pts
Redan	14	2	2	0	1859	890	208.88%	64	Elimination	Darley	12	12	84	Sunbury	2	10	22
North Ballarat City	13	2	3	0	1742	860	202.56%	60	Elimination	Lake Wendouree	11	15	81	East Point	11	3	69
Darley	12	2	4	0	1881	1129	166.61%	56	Qualifying	Redan	18	15	123	North Ballarat City	8	9	57
Lake Wendouree	12	2	4	0	1596	1050	152.00%	56	1st Semi	North Ballarat City	17	11	113	Lake Wendouree	5	14	44
East Point	10	2	6	0	1570	1289	121.80%	48	2nd Semi	Darley	15	7	97	Redan	11	13	79
Sunbury	8	2	8	0	1541	1389	110.94%	40	Preliminary	North Ballarat City	15	9	99	Redan	12	12	84
Bacchus Marsh	8	2	8	0	1272	1381	92.11%	40	Grand	Darley	11	18	84	North Ballarat City	3	5	23
Ballarat	4	2	12	0	1168	1382	84.52%	24									
Melton	3	2	12	1	1006	1742	57.75%	22									
Melton South	2	2	13	1	1187	2189	54.23%	18									
Sebastopol	1	2	15	0	724	2245	32.25%	12									

=== 2016 ===
Ballarat FL	Wins	Byes	Losses	Draws	For	Against	%	Pts	Final	Team	G	B	Pts	Team	G	B	Pts
Lake Wendouree	14	2	2	0	1630	1120	145.54%	64	Elimination	Sunbury	12	11	83	Darley	7	11	53
Bacchus Marsh	12	2	4	0	1767	1001	176.52%	56	Elimination	Redan	12	7	79	North Ballarat City	5	18	48
Sunbury	12	2	4	0	1798	1168	153.94%	56	Qualifying	Bacchus Marsh	13	13	91	Lake Wendouree	7	8	50
Redan	11	2	5	0	1484	1027	144.50%	52	1st Semi	Lake Wendouree	11	14	80	Redan	8	11	59
North Ballarat City	11	2	5	0	1695	1220	138.93%	52	2nd Semi	Bacchus Marsh	21	12	138	Sunbury	14	6	90
Darley	7	2	9	0	1336	1540	86.75%	36	Preliminary	Sunbury	14	22	106	Lake Wendouree	9	14	68
East Point	6	2	10	0	1332	1335	99.78%	32	Grand	Bacchus Marsh	13	21	99	Sunbury	5	14	44
Melton	6	2	10	0	1145	1353	84.63%	32									
Ballarat	5	2	11	0	1185	1700	69.71%	28									
Sebastopol	2	2	14	0	906	1518	59.68%	16									
Melton South	0	2	16	0	950	2246	42.30%	8									

=== 2017 ===
Ballarat FL	Wins	Byes	Losses	Draws	For	Against	%	Pts	Final	Team	G	B	Pts	Team	G	B	Pts
Lake Wendouree	14	2	2	0	1670	1105	151.13%	64	Elimination	Darley	15	15	105	North Ballarat City	7	5	47
Bacchus Marsh	13	2	2	1	1686	1019	165.46%	62	Elimination	Redan	13	13	91	Sunbury	9	9	63
Darley	12	2	4	0	1606	1100	146.00%	56	Qualifying	Bacchus Marsh	11	13	79	Lake Wendouree	6	13	49
Redan	12	2	4	0	1423	1092	130.31%	56	1st Semi	Lake Wendouree	12	10	82	Redan	7	10	52
Sunbury	9	2	7	0	1243	998	124.55%	44	2nd Semi	Darley	18	18	126	Bacchus Marsh	3	10	28
North Ballarat City	6	2	10	0	1349	1414	95.40%	32	Preliminary	Bacchus Marsh	14	15	99	Lake Wendouree	9	9	63
East Point	5	2	9	2	1383	1549	89.28%	32	Grand	Darley	14	13	97	Bacchus Marsh	6	11	47
Melton South	6	2	10	0	1358	1663	81.66%	32									
Melton	5	2	11	0	1012	1248	81.09%	28									
Ballarat	3	2	12	1	1144	1580	72.41%	22									
Sebastapol	1	2	15	0	870	1976	44.03%	12									

== Bibliography ==
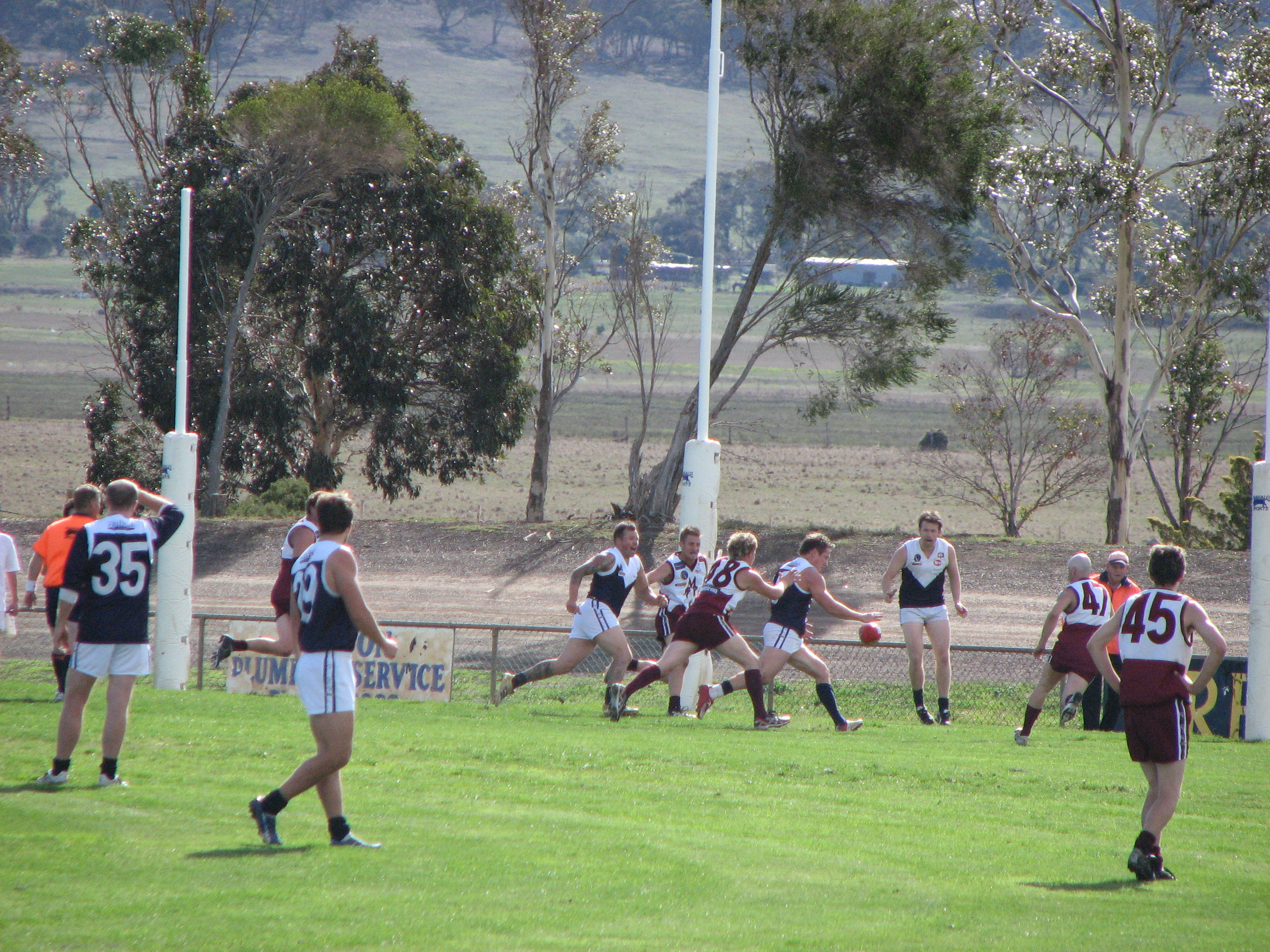
Reserves match between Melton and Melton South

- History of Football in the Ballarat District by John Stoward - ISBN 978-0-9805929-0-0
