= Tony Bourke =

Tony Bourke may refer to:

- Tony Bourke (footballer)
- Tony Bourke (politician)
