= Ian Gordon (footballer) =

Australian rules footballer

Personal information
- Full name: Ian Gordon
- Born: 11 February 1933
- Died: 25 January 2024 (aged 90)
- Original team: Golden Point
- Height: 173 cm (5 ft 8 in)
- Weight: 78 kg (172 lb)

Playing career^{1}
Years	Club	Games (Goals)
1957	St Kilda	1 (0)
- ^{1} Playing statistics correct to the end of 1957.

Ian Gordon (11 February 1933 – 25 January 2024) was an Australian rules footballer who played with St Kilda in the Victorian Football League (VFL).

A half back flanker, Gordon started his career playing for Golden Point in the Ballarat Football League. He joined St Kilda in 1956 but didn't debut until the 1957 VFL season, when he appeared in St Kilda's round two loss to Footscray at Western Oval. It would be his only senior game for St Kilda.

Gordon then played with Port Melbourne in 1958. He returned to Golden Point in 1959 and won that year's Henderson Medal before transferring to South Australian National Football League (SANFL) club Norwood for the 1960 SANFL season, playing in Norwood's unsuccessful Grand Final that year.
