= Bill Hearn =

Australian rules footballer

Personal information
- Full name: Roger Musgrove Hearn
- Born: 4 March 1914; Bungaree, Victoria
- Died: 3 November 1949 (aged 35); Oodnadatta, South Australia
- Original team: South Ballarat
- Height: 178 cm (5 ft 10 in)
- Weight: 71 kg (157 lb)

Playing career^{1}
Years	Club	Games (Goals)
1935	Richmond	6 (5)
- ^{1} Playing statistics correct to the end of 1935.

Roger Musgrove "Bill" Hearn (4 March 1914 – 3 November 1949), also known as William Hearn (Note: Hearn went by this name from approximately 1941 until his death in 1949.), was an Australian rules footballer who played with Richmond in the Victorian Football League (VFL).

A talented local footballer during his time in Ballarat and then Minyip, which bookended his short league career at Richmond, Hearn later joined the Australian Army as part of the Second Australian Imperial Force. Altering his birth year and changing his name to William to avoid rejection for prior criminal convictions, Hearn spent four years at war before his discharge in late 1945. He ultimately died in 1949 at 35 years of age, estranged from his family and residing in the remote outback town of Oodnadatta, South Australia.

== Early life ==
The son of Richard William Hearn (1875–1934), and Sarah Jane Hearn (1877–1947), née Dempsey, Roger Musgrove Hearn, known as "Bill", was born at Bungaree, Victoria on 4 March 1914.

== Football career ==
=== Local football in Ballarat (1932–1934) ===
In 1932, Hearn played 11 games and scored 16 goals as an 18-year-old for Golden Point in the Ballarat Football League (BFL). The following season, he transferred to the South Ballarat in the same league to play alongside brother Donald, better known as "Mike".

In 1934, Hearn first tried out with Richmond in the VFL, but was unsuccessful in graduating to their playing list. Instead of returning to South Ballarat, Hearn instead transferred to Lascelles in the Mallee Football Association in June to play alongside another of his brothers, John. However, Hearn soon reneged on his transfer and stayed at South Ballarat, eventually playing in that year's grand final as they won the premiership over Horsham in the Ballarat–Wimmera League.

=== League career for Richmond (1935) ===
In 1935, Hearn was eventually cleared to Richmond, and he played in 6 games, scoring 5 goals, for the First XVIII, and in 8 games, scoring 7 goals, for the Second XVIII. He was also selected to play for Richmond in its exhibition match, against the Tasmanian Football League's representative team, at North Hobart on 3 August 1935. However, at the last minute he was replaced in the team.

=== Return to local football; prison sentence (1936–1939) ===
In May 1936, Hearn returned to South Ballarat and was transferred back to the club. Later that month, Hearn went on trial in Ballarat for break-and-enter and theft, having stolen watches and money from a local bookmaker. He pleaded guilty the following month and was sentenced to six months' hard labour, which would be suspended if Hearn paid a £25 bond, abstained from drinking for six months, and was of good behaviour for two years.

Lured by the draw of his brother Mike, Hearn moved to Minyip in the Wimmera Football League in 1937, where he would go on to play his best football. Hearn won Minyip's leading goalkicker award in 1939, with 41 goals, and was described as a "match-winner".

Midway through August 1939, Hearn and his younger brother Leslie were arrested on account of a spate of late-night robberies at Minyip businesses. At Minyip Police Court later that month, Hearn pleaded guilty to three charges of shop-breaking, while the charge against Leslie was dismissed. At Horsham General Sessions in September, Hearn again pleaded guilty to all three charges, and was "sentenced to six months' imprisonment with hard labour on each charge, the sentences to be concurrent". He also admitted to his prior conviction for housebreaking in Ballarat in 1936.

=== Release from prison; final season of local football (1940) ===
Hearn was released from prison in March 1940, around the time of his 26th birthday. Searching for a new club to play for after his indiscretions at Minyip prevented him from returning, Hearn tried out with Geelong in the VFL in early April alongside younger brother Leslie. Neither brother was selected in the side's practice match squads later that month, and so Hearn went west, joining Coleraine in the Western District Football League. Hearn dominated the league, booting six goals in the grand final to steer Coleraine to premiership victory in a match where he was described as being "in rare form in attack".

== War service ==
On 11 August 1941, Hearn enlisted with the Australian Army as part of the Second Australian Imperial Force (AIF). He falsified details on his attestation form, giving his name as William Hearn and changing his year of birth to 1913 to avoid being refused acceptance due to prior convictions. During Hearn's four-and-a-quarter years in the Army, he attained the rank of Private yet committed numerous misdemeanours, of which at least 16 offences were listed on his service and casualty forms. Hearn also had a two further court-martial trials which saw him subjected to field punishment and docked pay.

Hearn discharged from the Army on 21 December 1945, erroneously listing his real birth year of 1914 on his discharge form, which was then 'corrected' by the completing officer.

== Later life ==
Following his discharge, Hearn continued to be employed as a labourer. On Christmas Eve 1947, Hearn was charged (under the name William Hearn) for the attempted bribe of a police officer after he was arrested for another charge. The judge said "Hearn's clumsy action appeared to be the result of liquor". Hearn's lawyer appealed for leniency on behalf of his "five years' good record with the AIF", and Hearn was ultimately fined £4, in default 14 days' imprisonment and granted a stay of 28 days.

== Death ==
By 1949, Hearn had migrated to the remote town of Oodnadatta in South Australia; it was here where he died on 3 November 1949 under the name William Hearn. Estranged from his family, Hearn's death certificate listed him of "no fixed abode" and with "no relative recorded".

== Sources ==
- Holmesby, Russell; Main, Jim (2014). The Encyclopedia of AFL Footballers: every AFL/VFL player since 1897 (10th ed.). Seaford, Victoria: BAS Publishing. ISBN 978-1-921496-32-5.
- Hogan P: The Tigers Of Old, Richmond FC, (Melbourne), 1996. ISBN 0-646-18748-1: note that Hogan, at p.97, has him as Hearne.
- World War Two Nominal Roll: Private William Hearn (VX61457), Department of Veterans' Affairs.
- A41, 46330: "HEARN William (Private): Service Number - VX61457: Unit - 2/23rd Australian Infantry Battalion, Australian Infantry Battalion: Date of Court Martial - 17 December 1942" (documents not yet examined for release), National Archives of Australia.
- A471, 47957: "HEARN William (Private): Service Number - VX61457: Unit - 2/23rd Australian Infantry Battalion, Australian Military Forces: Date of Court Martial - 29 August 1943" (documents not yet examined for release), National Archives of Australia.
- B883, VX61457: World War Two Service Record: Private William Hearn (VX61457), National Archives of Australia.
