= Alister Ford =

Australian rules footballer

Personal information
- Full name: Alister Ford
- Born: 15 December 1963 (age 62)
- Original team: Bairnsdale
- Height: 196 cm (6 ft 5 in)
- Weight: 86 kg (190 lb)
- Position: Ruckman/Forward

Playing career^{1}
Years	Club	Games (Goals)
1981–1985	Footscray	21 (17)
1986–1987	St Kilda	18 (2)
Total		39 (19)
- ^{1} Playing statistics correct to the end of 1987.

Alister Ford (born 15 December 1963) is a former Australian rules footballer who played with Footscray and St Kilda in the Victorian Football League (VFL).

Ford, a Bairnsdale recruit, was a ruckman and key position forward. He kicked three goals on his league debut, against Collingwood at Victoria Park, aged just 17.

He was never able to establish a place in the senior team, with his most productive year coming in 1983 when he made nine appearances, most in the second half of the season.

Ford joined St Kilda in 1986 and came into the side in the second round of the season, to replace full-forward Tony Lockett, who was serving a suspension. He played his best football mid-season, with a career high 21 disposals against Geelong and received the only Brownlow vote of his career for his efforts in a win over Melbourne.

When he time at St Kilda came to an end he made his way to East Ballarat, with whom he would play over 100 games. He won the Henderson Medal in 1998. Ford also spent some time at St Albans in the Geelong Football League and was joint winner of the competition's best and fairest award in 1995.
