= Frank Pike (footballer) =

Australian rules footballer

Personal information
- Full name: Frank Pike
- Born: 3 June 1925
- Died: 11 November 2011 (aged 86)
- Height: 180 cm (5 ft 11 in)
- Weight: 73 kg (161 lb)

Playing career^{1}
Years	Club	Games (Goals)
1945–47	Geelong	9 (0)
- ^{1} Playing statistics correct to the end of 1947.

Frank Pike (3 June 1925 – 11 November 2011) was an Australian rules footballer who played with Geelong in the Victorian Football League (VFL).

Pike won the 1950 Ballarat Football League best and fairest award, the Ballarat Courier Gold Medal.
