= Max Wheeler (footballer) =

Australian rules footballer

Personal information
- Full name: Geoffrey Maxwell Wheeler
- Born: 21 May 1912; Coleraine, Victoria, Australia
- Died: 17 June 1941 (aged 29); Merdjayoun, French Lebanon
- Original team: Ballarat Football Club
- Position: Forward pocket

Playing career^{1}
Years	Club	Games (Goals)
1937	Hawthorn	1 (0)
- ^{1} Playing statistics correct to the end of 1937.

Geoffrey Maxwell Wheeler (21 May 1912 – 17 June 1941) was an Australian rules footballer who played with Hawthorn in the Victorian Football League (VFL). He played only one VFL game, against Melbourne.

External image
- Egyptian Toy Camel: Private G M Wheeler, 2/2 Pioneer Battalion, Collection of the Australian War Memorial.

== Family ==
The son of Herbert John Wheeler (1877–1947), and Eliza Lousia Wheeler (1878–1975), née James, Geoffrey Maxwell Wheeler was born at Coleraine, Victoria on 21 May 1912.

He married Margaret Isabel Lingham (1914–1998) in 1937. They had three children: Maxine, Alan and Mabel.

== Football ==
Wheeler topped the Ballarat-Wimmera Football League goalkicking total in 1936 with 107 goals.

Hawthorn managed to secure a permit from Ballarat for Wheeler to play on a Monday in June 1937. He played on a split round weekend in which the Hawks and Melbourne played at Glenferrie Oval. The following week he was dropped and lined up in the reserves. A few weeks later while playing in the seconds Wheeler had his arm broken, which finished his season.

Wheeler returned from Hawthorn and played with North Ballarat FC and he topped the Ballarat Football League goalkicking in 1938 with 93 goals and in 1939, 93 goals.

In 1938, Wheeler kicked 17 goals in a match against the Ballarat CYMS FC.

== Military service ==
He enlisted in the Second AIF on 24 July 1940, and served in the 2/2 Pioneer Battalion.

== Death ==
He was killed in action at Merdjayoun, in French Lebanon, on 17 June 1941, serving with the Second AIF.

== See also ==
- List of Victorian Football League players who died on active service

== Sources ==
- Roll of Honour: Private Geoffrey Maxwell Wheeler (VX45857), Australian War Memorial.
- Epic of The Pioneers: History Made at Merdjayoun, The Age, (Friday, 26 September 1941), p. 6.
- Private Geoffrey Maxwell Wheeler (VX45857), Commonwealth War Graves Commission.
- World War Two Nominal Roll: Private Geoffrey Maxwell Wheeler (VX45857), Department of Veterans' Affairs.
- Holmesby, Russell & Main, Jim (2007). The Encyclopedia of AFL Footballers. 7th ed. Melbourne: Bas Publishing.
- Quinlan, Kim, "Footy Stars of the Battlefield", The (Ballarat) Courier, 4 April 2002.
