= Stan Wallis =

Australian rules footballer

Personal information
- Full name: Stan Wallis
- Born: 17 November 1927
- Died: 2 March 2013 (aged 85)
- Original team: Waratahs / Redan
- Height: 168 cm (5 ft 6 in)
- Weight: 69 kg (152 lb)

Playing career^{1}
Years	Club	Games (Goals)
1948–49	Footscray	7 (4)
- ^{1} Playing statistics correct to the end of 1949.

Stan Wallis (17 November 1927 – 2 March 2013) was an Australian rules footballer who played with Footscray in the Victorian Football League (VFL).

Wallis originally finished second on a countback in the 1952 Ballarat Football League best and fairest award, the Ballarat Courier Gold Medal, but was awarded it retrospectively in 2010.
