= Michael Phyland =

Australian rules footballer

Personal information
- Born: 29 September 1965 (age 61)
- Original team: Mangoplah-Cookardinia United
- Draft: No. 50, 1989 pre-season draft
- Height: 181 cm (5 ft 11 in)
- Weight: 80 kg (176 lb)

Playing career^{1}
Years	Club	Games (Goals)
1987–1990	Sydney Swans	22 (6)
- ^{1} Playing statistics correct to the end of 1990.

Michael Phyland (born 29 September 1965) is a former Australian rules footballer who played with the Sydney Swans in the Victorian Football League (VFL).

Phyland represented New South Wales at Under 18 Championships in 1982 and won the Larke Medal.

He played four seasons for the Swans and made a total of 22 appearances.

After leaving Sydney he played with Redan in the Ballarat Football League and was the 1992 Henderson Medalist.
