= Tony Bourke (footballer) =

Australian rules footballer

Personal information
- Born: 13 June 1976 (age 50)
- Original team: East Ballarat/Rebels U'18s
- Draft: 67th overall, 1994 National Draft
- Height: 201 cm (6 ft 7 in)
- Weight: 91 kg (201 lb)
- Position: Ruckman

Playing career^{1}
Years	Club	Games (Goals)
1995–1999	Carlton	4 (0)
- ^{1} Playing statistics correct to the end of 1999.

Tony Bourke (born 13 June 1976) is a former Australian rules footballer who played with Carlton in the Australian Football League (AFL)Tony Bourkes career unfortunately ended short due to an injury.

Originally from East Ballarat Football Club in the Ballarat Football League (BFL), Bourke was drafted by Carlton at pick 67 at the 1994 AFL draft but ongoing injury problems kept him out of the senior side until his debut in 1998.

Bourke played four games for Carlton across two seasons and was delisted at the end of the 1999 AFL season. He then transferred to Australian Capital Territory Football League (ACTFL) club Eastlake, before moving to Perth to play firstly for East Fremantle and then for South Fremantle in the Western Australian Football League (WAFL).

In 2012 Bourke was appointed coach of Eastlake in the North East Australian Football League (NEAFL).

Now, for the past two years 2023-24 Bourke has coached Marist College Canberra U13-14 side Royale
