= David Norman (Australian footballer) =

Australian rules footballer (1942–2025)

Personal information
- Full name: David Norman
- Born: 1 April 1942; Beaufort, Victoria
- Died: 20 April 2025 (aged 83)
- Original team: North Ballarat
- Height: 175 cm (5 ft 9 in)
- Weight: 68 kg (150 lb)
- Position: Rover

Playing career
Years	Club	Games (Goals)
1961–1966	Collingwood	91 (148)

David Norman (1 April 1942 – 20 April 2025) was an Australian rules footballer who played with Collingwood in the Victorian Football League (VFL) during the 1960s.

Growing up in his hometown of Beaufort, Norman won the Lexton League best and fairest as a 17 year old. He transferred to North Ballarat in the 1960 BFL season and won the league's "Best and Fairest" award, known as the Henderson Medal. The following season he joined Collingwood where he would spend six seasons as a rover and small forward.

Known for his strength and courage, Norman appeared as a half forward flanker in the 1964 VFL Grand Final but ended up on the losing team. He kicked a career high 40 goals that year, bettering his 36-goal effort in 1962. Neither were enough to top Collingwood's goal-kicking but he earned that accolade in 1965 when he booted 32 goals. Norman also twice kicked six goals in a game during his career, both times against North Melbourne.

He finished his career back in the Ballarat Football League, with Beaufort.
