= Greg Packham =

Australian rules footballer

Personal information
- Full name: Greg Packham
- Born: 1 March 1959 (age 67)
- Original team: Redan
- Height: 175 cm (5 ft 9 in)
- Weight: 76 kg (168 lb)

Playing career^{1}
Years	Club	Games (Goals)
1982–1983	St Kilda	17 (31)
- ^{1} Playing statistics correct to the end of 1983.

Greg Packham (born 1 March 1959) is a former Australian rules footballer who played with St Kilda in the Victorian Football League (VFL) during the 1980s.

From Ballarat, Packham started his career at St Kilda in 1982 and kicked 24 goals from 12 appearances that year. He played just five further games for St Kilda and finished with an unusual statistic of having kicked at least one goal in every one of his 17 league games.

The red haired forward then returned to his original club Redan and in 1981 won the Henderson Medal, awarded to the best and fairest player in the Ballarat Football League. He was later named as a forward pocket in Redan's official "Team of the 20th Century".

In 1985, he played for Caulfield in the Victorian Football Association, and he finished second in the J. Field Medal for best and fairest of Division 2. In 1986, he tied for the Grogan Medal, with Coorparoo's Brendan McMullen, in the 1986 Queensland Australian Football League season with Kedron.
