= Lake Wendouree Football Club =

Lake Wendouree

Names
- Full name: Lake Wendouree Football Netball Club
- Nickname: Lakers

Club details
- Founded: 1994; 32 years ago
- Colours
- Competition: Ballarat Football League
- Ground: C.E. Brown Reserve

Uniforms
Home

Other information
- Official website: lwfnc.com

The Lake Wendouree Football Netball Club (nicknamed the Lakers) is an Australian rules football and netball club located in the Ballarat North suburb of Victoria. The football squad currently competes in the Ballarat Football League. The club is a result of a merger of the Wendouree Football Club and the Ballarat YCW Football Club at the end of 1994.

Lake Wendouree Football Club competed in the Ballarat Football League for the first time in 1995. The club was runner up in its second season and played finals every year for the first six seasons.

== Home ground ==
The football squad play their home matches at C.E. Brown Reserve, Ballarat North.

== History ==
=== Ballarat YCW Football Club ===
Competed in senior competition between 1946 and 1949. The club concentrated on filling junior competitions until their merger in 1994.

=== Wendouree Football Club ===
Wendouree football club was reformed in 1946 and competed in district competitions around Ballarat before being a founding member of the Central Highlands Football League in 1979.

- Central Highlands Football League
  - Senior premierships
    - 1947, 1949, 1963, 1971, 1972, 1973, and 1983.

=== Post Merger ===
In recent times, Lake Wendouree Junior Football Club have won several premierships with the Under 12 reserves and seniors winning the premiership in 2013. The Under 14s won the seniors and reserves premierships in 2015 and also the Under 14s seniors premiership in 2016. Both the under 16.5s reserves and seniors had success in their 2017 campaigns with the reserves being undefeated all year and only losing to a stacked Bacchus Marsh side. Some of the top players for the Lake Wendouree reserves for the game were Ethan Forbes, Harry Carter, Liam Vercoe, Bailey McCabe and Josh Canny. The seniors also had a great season, only losing 2 games during the regular season. They would defeat North Ballarat, previously the dominant side all year in the preliminary final. They would face North Ballarat again in the grand final and ultimately emerged victorious. The top players of the game for Lake Wendouree included Ned Nash, Jordy Clark, Iggy Duke and Will Clark.

==== VFL/AFL players ====
- Con Britt - Collingwood
- Des Tuddenham - Collingwood and Essendon
- Mark Orchard - Collingwood and Sydney
- Gavin Maher - Richmond
- Alex McDonald - Collingwood and Hawthorn
- James McDonald - Melbourne and Greater Western Sydney
- James Walker - Fremantle
- Jordan Roughead - Western Bulldogs and Collingwood
- Steve Clifton- Greater Western Sydney
- Dan Butler- Richmond and St Kilda
- Kai Lohmann - Brisbane Lions

== Ballarat Football League Premierships ==
- Seniors
  - 2010
- Under 18.5 years
  - 2002, 2004
- Under 16.5 years
  - 2003, 2006, 2017
- Under 16. years
  - 2001, 2002, 2015, 2016
- Under 13.5 years
  - 2003, 2004
- Under 12 years
  - 1997, 1998, 2001

== BFL Leading Goalkicker - Tony Lockett Medallists ==
- 1969 - Gavin Maher: 143
- 1999 - Daryl Jarred: 103
- 2005 - Brad Maxwell: 83

== Bibliography ==
- History of Football in the Ballarat District by John Stoward - ISBN 978-0-9805929-0-0
