= Darren Stanley =

Australian rules footballer

Personal information
- Full name: Darren Stanley
- Born: 2 February 1972 (age 54)
- Original team: Coburg
- Height: 174 cm (5 ft 9 in)
- Weight: 78 kg (172 lb)

Playing career^{1}
Years	Club	Games (Goals)
1991	Footscray	3 (2)
- ^{1} Playing statistics correct to the end of 1991.

Darren Stanley (born 2 February 1972) is a former Australian rules footballer who played with Footscray in the Victorian Football League (VFL).

Stanley, who Footscray secured from Coburg, appeared in three of the last four rounds of the 1991 AFL season. He then returned to Coburg and also had a stint in Western Australia with West Perth.

He had a decorated career in the Ballarat Football League. While at Melton South in 1998, he was awarded the Henderson Medal, a joint winner with Leigh Trethowan. Stanley joined rivals Melton in 2000 and won the medal again in his first year and was runner-up in 2001. In both of those years, he was also a member of premiership teams. He announced his retirement at the end of the 2009 season.
