= Bill James (footballer) =

Australian rules footballer

Personal information
- Full name: Bill T. James
- Born: 23 March 1937
- Original team: Geelong West
- Height: 187 cm (6 ft 2 in)
- Weight: 78 kg (172 lb)

Playing career^{1}
Years	Club	Games (Goals)
1957	Geelong	3 (1)
- ^{1} Playing statistics correct to the end of 1957.

Bill T. James (born 23 March 1937) is a former Australian rules footballer who played with Geelong in the Victorian Football League (VFL).

James came from Geelong West to play three senior games for Geelong in the 1957 VFL season. He was back at Geelong West the following year and won the Ballarat Football League's best and fairest award.
