= Brian Clegg (footballer) =

Australian rules footballer (1930–2007)

Personal information
- Full name: Brian George Clegg
- Born: 12 April 1930
- Died: 20 January 2007 (aged 76)
- Height: 183 cm (6 ft 0 in)
- Weight: 90 kg (198 lb)

Playing career^{1}
Years	Club	Games (Goals)
1951	South Melbourne	2 (0)
- ^{1} Playing statistics correct to the end of 1951.

Brian George Clegg (12 April 1930 – 20 January 2007) was an Australian rules footballer who played with South Melbourne in the Victorian Football League (VFL).

Clegg made two appearances, as a half back flanker, in the 1951 VFL season. He played those games beside his brother, Brownlow Medal winner Ron Clegg.

He later made a name for himself in the Ballarat Football League, where he played for Geelong West. In 1956 he won the league's best and fairest award.
