= Anthony Walsh (criminologist) =

American professor

- Education: Eastern Michigan University, University of Toledo, Bowling Green State University
- Scientific career
- Fields: Criminology
- Institutions: Boise State University
- Thesis: Differential sentencing patterns among felony sex offenders and non-sex offenders (1983)

Anthony Walsh is an American criminologist and professor emeritus at Boise State University in Boise, Idaho. He was educated at Eastern Michigan University (B.A. in sociology, 1975), the University of Toledo (M.A. in medical sociology, 1977), and Bowling Green State University (Ph.D. in criminology, 1983). He worked in law enforcement for 21 years before joining the faculty of Boise State University in 1984. These positions included a stint as a probation officer in Lucas County, Ohio.

He became interested in the science of love while working on parole and probation cases, during which time he noticed many of these cases pertained to love. He subsequently wrote the book The Science of Love: Understanding Love and Its Effects, which was published in 1991. Walsh is also the author of the books Biosociology: An Emerging Paradigm (1995), Criminology: A Global Perspective (with Lee Ellis, 2000), African Americans and Serial Killing in the Media: The Myth and the Reality. Research Methods in Criminal Justice and Criminology: An Interdisciplinary Approach (with Lee Ellis and Richard D. Hartley, 2009), Introduction to Criminology: A Text/Reader (with Craig Hemmens, 2008; 4th ed., 2018), Corrections: A Text/Reader (with Mary Stohr and Craig Hemmens, 2009; 2nd ed., 2013), Feminist Criminology Through a Biosocial Lens (2011), Criminology: The Essentials (2012), and Biosociology: Bridging the Biology-Sociology Divide (2014). He is the co-editor, with Kevin M. Beaver, of Biosocial Criminology: New Directions in Theory and Research.

In 2008, he received Boise State University's Tenured Research Award.
