= Stuart Atkin =

Australian rules footballer

Personal information
- Full name: Stuart Atkin
- Born: 16 May 1957 (age 69)
- Original team: Beaufort
- Height: 196 cm (6 ft 5 in)
- Weight: 96 kg (212 lb)

Playing career^{1}
| Years | Club | Games (Goals) |
| 1980–1983 | Collingwood | 18 (2) |
- ^{1} Playing statistics correct to the end of 1983.

Stuart Atkin (born 16 May 1957) is a former Australian rules footballer who played with Collingwood in the Victorian Football League (VFL) during the early 1980s.

Stuart is the fourth son of a soldier settler family in the Western District of Victoria. He started his junior football with SMW Rovers (Streatham, Mininera and Westmere) in the Mininera League. Beaufort Football Club then playing in the Ballarat League recruited him in 1976 on permit initially. After only playing a half season in 1977 on permit he came third in the Ballarat League Best and Fairest (The Henderson Medal). He was initially refused a clearance from his former club until he decided to stand out of football rather than continue with SMW Rovers. After joining Beaufort full-time in 1978 he won the Henderson medal that year in the Ballarat Football League.

After arriving in 1979 from Beaufort, Atkin played a lot of reserves football before finally breaking into the Collingwood seniors in 1980. The second of his two appearances that season was in an Elimination Final win over North Melbourne. An understudy to ruckman Peter Moore, Atkin played 12 games in 1981 and was named on the interchange bench (although he started on the field as ruckman) in Collingwood's losing 1981 VFL Grand Final side.

He joined Preston in 1984, as a replacement for the retired Geoff Austen. Preston won the 1984 grand final being the second year in a row (back to back).
