= Eastern Oval =

Sports ground in Ballarat, Australia

Coordinates: 37°33′27.88″S 143°51′48.75″E

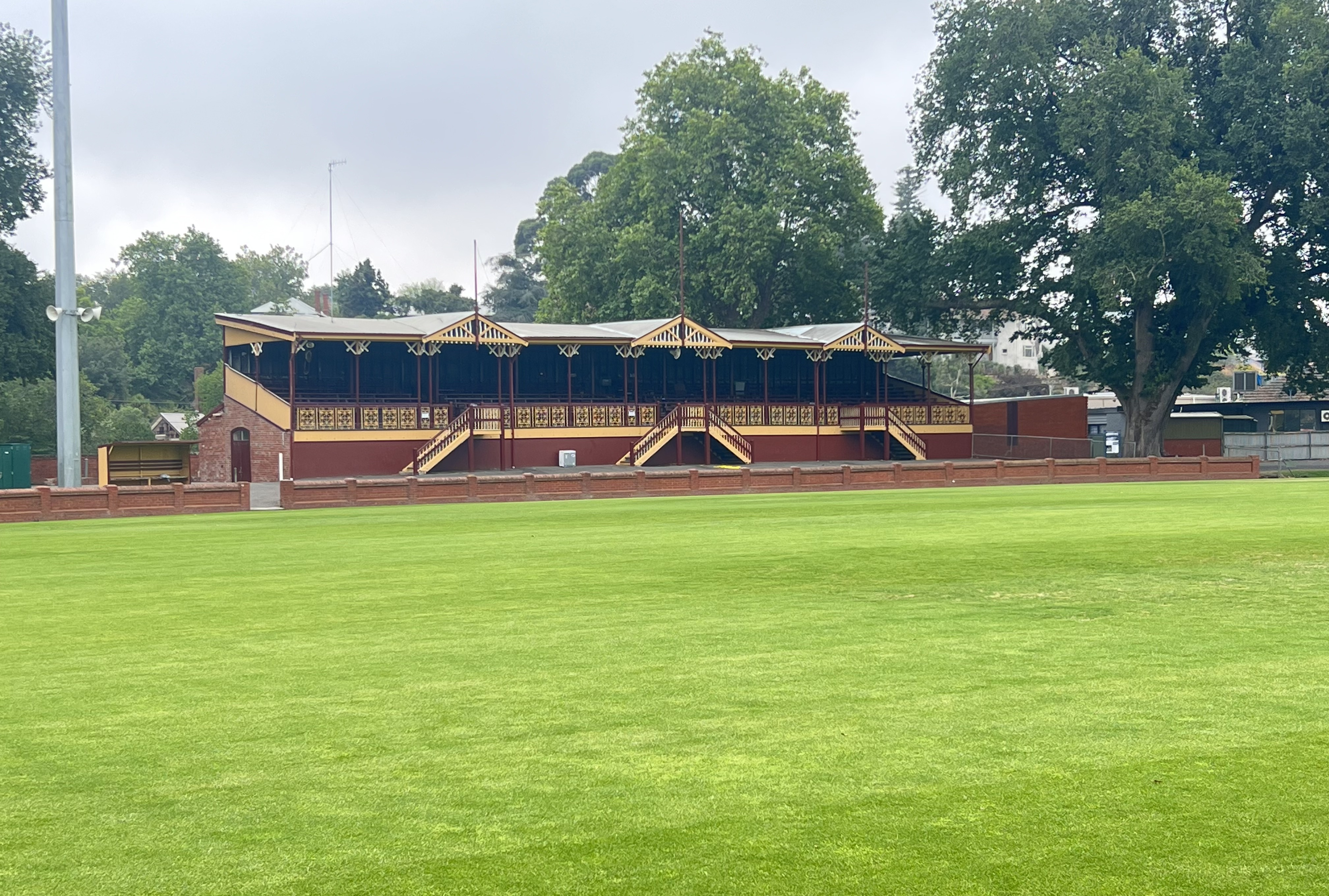
- Interactive map of Eastern Oval

Ground information
- Location: Ballarat, Victoria
- Establishment: 1862 (first recorded match)
- Capacity: 8,000
- End names
- Bowling Club End; City End

International information
- Only men's ODI: 9 March 1992: England v Sri Lanka

Team information
| Victoria | (1985–2005) |
| Golden Point Cricket Club | (1910-present) |
| East Point Football Club | (2001-present) |
- As of 21 October 2011; Source: Ground profile

Eastern Oval (formerly known as the Ballarat Cricket Ground) is an Australian rules football and cricket ground in the city of Ballarat, Victoria, Australia.

The first recorded match on the ground in 1862 when Ballarat played HH Stephenson's XI. The ground was an important early centre of cricket in Victoria, hosting the Australia team, as well as personal teams from important cricketing figures such as George Parr, W. G. Grace and John Lillywhite to name a few.

The oval is characterised by its steep grassy embankments, historic timber grandstand, and large trees that surround the playing field. It remains popular as a sports venue in Ballarat because of its intimacy, closeness to the city centre, and historic character.

== Cricket ==
More than a hundred years later the ground held its first First-Class match when Victoria played an England XI in a List A match in 1985. The only first-class match to be held there to date was played in 1990 when Victoria played an England XI.

The ground was selected as a venue for the 1992 Cricket World Cup, staging a One Day International between England and Sri Lanka. This match resulted in an England win by 106 runs. Two further List A matches have been held there, one in the 2003/04 ING Cup between Victoria and Queensland and another between the same teams in the following season's competition.

The oval hosted four games as part of the 2021-22 Women's Big Bash League season, including a derby between the Melbourne Renegades and the Melbourne Stars.

== Modern development ==
In February 2015, the Ballarat City Council released its Master Plan for the 10 year development of the oval projected to cost $4.2 million (AUD). In 2016 $1 million of works had been completed including a new netball court with lighting, synthetic bowling green and synthetic cricket training facility. In February 2017, Cricket Victoria and the Ballarat City Council announced that the ground will receive a further $2 million (AUD) upgrade to develop it as one of eight State cricketing hubs. This project includes the upgrade of oval lighting to Cricket Australia's class two standard (300 lux to outfield and 500 lux to centre wicket), development of new turf wicket training facilities and redevelopment of the existing change facilities to make them female friendly.

== Australian rules football ==
The earliest known organised match of women's Australian rules football in Victoria was held at Eastern Oval on 28 September 1918. A team from the Commonwealth Clothing Factory, named the "Khakis", in South Melbourne travelled to the ground to play against a local team known as the "Lucas Girls". The game was played in front of 6'000 spectators. The funds raised by the game assisted in construction of the Arch of Victory. The local team won the game 3.6 (24) to 1.2 (8). Whilst newspapers of the time reported the South Melbourne team had played before this match, it is unclear whether these reports are factual. A return match was fixtured to be played on 9 November 1918 in Carlton, which may have been the first women's game in Melbourne.

The venue was home to the East Ballarat Football Club before the Club merged with Golden Point FC in 2001 to form the East Point Football Club, which now uses the oval as its home. The ground is currently used to host most Ballarat Football and Netball League finals games. The oval was also periodically used by the Australian Football League for pre-season games until 2017, when the Western Bulldogs committed to playing two to three games each season at Eureka Stadium.
