= Tony Walsh (footballer) =

Australian rules footballer

Personal information
- Full name: Anthony "Tony" Walsh
- Born: 30 November 1928
- Died: 18 November 1984 (aged 55)
- Original team: Geelong West
- Height: 183 cm (6 ft 0 in)
- Weight: 85.5 kg (188 lb)

Playing career^{1}
Years	Club	Games (Goals)
1952	Geelong	3 (4)
1953–54	Carlton	12 (20)
Total		15 (24)
- ^{1} Playing statistics correct to the end of 1954.

Tony Walsh (30 November 1928 – 18 November 1984) was an Australian rules footballer who played with Carlton and Geelong in the Victorian Football League (VFL).

Walsh won the 1951 Ballarat Football League senior football goal kicking award with 64 goals prior to playing with Geelong in 1952.
