= East Point Football Club =

East Point

Names
- Full name: East Point Football Netball Club
- Nickname(s): Kangaroos

Club details
- Founded: 2001; 24 years ago
- Colours
- Competition: Ballarat Football League
- Premierships: 1
- Ground(s): Eastern Oval

Uniforms
Home

The East Point Football Netball Club is an Australian rules football and netball club. The football squad competes in the Ballarat Football League. The club, originally named "East Point Kangaroos" was formed in 2001 when historical clubs East Ballarat and Golden Point merged.

== History ==
The East Ballarat Football Club was formed in 1885 and, at the time of its merger with Golden Point Football Club in 2001, East Ballarat was the second oldest club in the Ballarat Football League after Ballarat Football Club. The East Ballarat Football Club won 6 senior premierships in its history as an independent football club. Golden Point Football Club joined the Ballarat Football League in 1905 and won 14 senior premierships as an independent football club. The East Point Kangaroos now occupy the historic Eastern Oval, located in Ballarat East, which is known for its well preserved Edwardian architecture. The team's jumper was designed by Matthew Sheedy as a combination of the East Ballarat and Golden Point playing guernseys as well as the new combined club's mascot, the kangaroo.

== Club record and structure ==
The East Point Football Netball Club incorporates the East Point Junior Football Netball Club ("the Bulldogs") and the East Point Dragons Female Football Club ("the Dragons").

The East Point Kangaroos have enjoyed a lot of success on the football field and netball court in recent years with many finals appearances. In 2016 both the Reserves and Under 18.5 football teams were premiers with comfortable wins in the Grand Final. 2016 saw history being made as East Point claimed their first ever senior netball flag, with the A Grade netballers beating North Ballarat City in double overtime. The Under 18.5 footballers have also won flags in 2015 and 2009, and the Reserve footballers were premiers in 2009. In 2013 the B Grade netball team completed an undefeated season with a premiership win. East Point Kangaroos won their first senior premiership in 2018, after finishing runners-up in 2006, 2007, and 2009.

== See also ==
- East Ballarat Football Club
- Golden Point Football Club

== AFL players ==
- James Frawley - Melbourne. Hawthorn, St Kilda
- Harry Sharp- Brisbane Lions , Melbourne
- Daniel Rioli- Richmond, Gold Coast
- Josh Gibcus- Richmond
- Jake Neade - Port Adelaide
- Nick Hind - St Kilda, Essendon
