= Jack Boyd (footballer) =

Australian rules footballer

Personal information
- Full name: Jack Boyd
- Born: 24 February 1906
- Died: 26 April 1996 (aged 90)
- Original team: Ballarat

Playing career^{1}
Years	Club	Games (Goals)
1927	Essendon	2 (2)
- ^{1} Playing statistics correct to the end of 1927.

Jack Boyd (24 February 1906 – 26 April 1996) was an Australian rules footballer who played with Essendon in the Victorian Football League (VFL).
