= Keenan Reynolds (Australian footballer) =

Australian rules footballer (born 1969)

Personal information
- Full name: Keenan Reynolds
- Born: 7 January 1969 (age 57)
- Original team: Werribee Juniors
- Height: 188 cm (6 ft 2 in)
- Weight: 90 kg (198 lb)

Playing career^{1}
Years	Club	Games (Goals)
1990–1994	Footscray	74 (35)
1995–1996	North Melbourne	12 (2)
Total		86 (37)
- ^{1} Playing statistics correct to the end of 1996.

Keenan Reynolds (born 7 January 1969) is a former Australian rules footballer who played with Footscray and North Melbourne in the Australian Football League (AFL) during the 1990s.

A Werribee junior, Reynolds had also played some games with the Essendon Under-19s before he arrived at Western Oval. He was a regular fixture in the Footscray side in 1990, making 18 appearances, but spent much of 1991 on the sidelines with an eye injury.

Reynolds, a half back, played 17 successive games in the second half of the 1992 season, including three finals. He was often used up forward in 1993 and kicked six goals in a win over St Kilda on his home ground. Reynolds played 18 games in 1994 but left the club at the end of the season after an agreement on his salary could not be met.

Taken by North Melbourne in the pre-season draft, he made only nine appearances for his new team in 1995 but played in their reserves premiership. After adding just a further three games in 1996, Reynolds went to Tasmania to continue his career. He signed with the Burnie Dockers in the NTFL and played three seasons with the club from 1997 to 1999.
