= Alex Sinclair (footballer) =

Australian rules footballer

Personal information
- Full name: Alexander Sinclair
- Born: 29 January 1882; Beaufort, Victoria
- Died: 25 August 1962 (aged 80); Rhodesia
- Original team: Beaufort

Playing career^{1}
Years	Club	Games (Goals)
1902	St Kilda	3 (0)
- ^{1} Playing statistics correct to the end of 1902.

Alexander Sinclair (29 January 1882 – 25 August 1962) was an Australian rules footballer who played for the St Kilda Football Club in the Victorian Football League (VFL).
