= Gary Lofts =

Australian rules footballer

Personal information
- Full name: Gary Lofts
- Born: 5 October 1951 (age 75)
- Original team: Beaufort
- Height: 183 cm (6 ft 0 in)
- Weight: 86 kg (190 lb)
- Position: Utility

Playing career^{1}
| Years | Club | Games (Goals) |
| 1976–79, 1981 | St Kilda | 60 (102) |
- ^{1} Playing statistics correct to the end of 1981.

Gary Lofts (born 5 October 1951) is a former Australian rules footballer who played with St Kilda in the Victorian Football League (VFL).
