= East Ballarat Football Club =

East Ballarat

Names
- Full name: East Ballarat Football Club
- Nickname: Bulldogs

Club details
- Founded: 1885
- Dissolved: 2001; 25 years ago (merged with Golden Point to form the East Point FC)
- Colours
- Competition: Ballarat Football League
- Premierships: 6 (1949, 1950, 1964, 1989, 1990, 1993)

Uniforms
Home

The East Ballarat Football Club was an Australian rules football club which competed in the Ballarat Football League.

First formed in 1885 the club remained a junior club in their district, their senior club being Ballarat Imperial Football Club.

The upheaval of the 1930s in which the Ballarat competition merged with the Wimmera league for three years resulted with the dissolving of the Imperial. Reformed during the WWII the club in 1944 was promoted to the top level BFL competition. They won six premierships in 1949, 1950, 1964, 1989, 1990 & 1993.

They merged with Golden Point in 2001 to form the East Point Football Club.

== Premierships ==
- Ballarat Football League (6): 1949, 1950, 1964, 1989, 1990, 1993

== Notable players ==
- Graham Donaldson
- Danny Frawley
- Mark Orchard
- Sean Simpson
- Tony Evans
- Tony Bourke

== See also ==
- Golden Point Football Club
- East Point Football Club

== Book ==
History of Football in the Ballarat District by John Stoward - ISBN 978-0-9805929-0-0
