= Golden Point Football Club =

Australian rules football club

Golden Point

Names
- Full name: Golden Point Football Club
- Nickname: Rice Eaters

Club details
- Founded: 1880s formally founded 1902
- Dissolved: 2001; 25 years ago (merged with East Ballarat to form the East Point Football Club)
- Competition: Ballarat Football League
- Premierships: 14 (1910, 1914, 1919, 1920, 1921, 1939, 1947, 1948, 1953, 1966, 1967, 1980, 1981, 1987)

Uniforms
Home

The Golden Point Football Club was an Australian rules football club which competed in the Ballarat Football League from 1908 to 2000. They merged with East Ballarat in 2001 to form the East Point Football Club.

== History ==
The Golden Point Football Club had existed since the 1880's although they weren't formally founded until 1902.

- 1902 they were part of the Ballarat fourth rate association,
- 1903 they were part of the Ballarat third rate association,
- 1904 they were part of the Ballarat second rate association,
- 1905 they were part of the Ballarat first rate association and they won the premiership
- 1906 they were part of the Ballarat first rate Junior association and they won the premiership
- 1907 they were part of the Ballarat first rate Junior association and they won the premiership
- 1908 they were part of the Ballarat Football Association.

Golden Point was based on the Eastern Oval, in 2001 the club merged with their co-tenant East Ballarat.

== Notable players ==
- Charlie Clymo, St Kilda
- Con Britt, Collingwood
- Jack Collins, Geelong
- Robert Corbett, Melbourne
- Daryl Cunningham. St Kilda, Essendon
- Geoff Cunningham, St Kilda
- Bob Davis - Geelong
- Bill Hearn
- Brendan Birch
- Leigh Colbert, Geelong, North Melbourne
- Alan Martin, Western Bulldogs

== Book ==
History of Football in the Ballarat District by John Stoward - ISBN 978-0-9805929-0-0
