= Clunes District Football League =

Australian rules football league

The Clunes District Football League was an Australian rules football competition based around the town of Clunes, Victoria

== History ==
The Clunes District Football Association was formed in 1931.

Reg Coles from Daylesford won the 1937 league best and fairest award and H Dwan won it in 1938.

In 1940, the Clunes Football League was made up with eight teams.

== Clubs ==
=== Final ===
Club	Colours	Nickname	Home Ground	Former League	Est.	Years in CDFL	CDFL Senior Premierships		Fate
Club	Colours	Nickname	Home Ground	Former League	Est.	Years in CDFL	Total	Years	Fate
Bungaree		Demons	Bungaree Recreation Reserve, Bungaree	BFA	1897	1933-1936, 1951-1978	7	1954, 1956, 1957, 1959, 1971, 1973, 1976	Formed Central Highlands FL in 1979
Clunes		Magpies	Ligar Street Reserve, Clunes	MDFL	1869	1931-1978	7	1934, 1951, 1953, 1958, 1960, 1963, 1978	Formed Central Highlands FL in 1979
Creswick		Wickers	Doug Lindsay Reserve, Creswick	B&DFA, BDFL	1869	1932-1940, 1950-1978	4	1940, 1950, 1961, 1974	Formed Central Highlands FL in 1979
Hepburn		Burras	Hepburn Recreation Reserve, Hepburn	D&DFL	1919	1947-1978	0	-	Formed Central Highlands FL in 1979
Korweinguboora		Bulldogs	Korweinguboora Recreation Reserve, Spargo Creek	BDFL	1920s	1961-1978	0	-	Formed Central Highlands FL in 1979
Learmonth		Lakies	Learmonth Recreation Reserve, Learmonth	B&DFA	1889	1940-1978	2	1952, 1955	Formed Central Highlands FL in 1979
Newlyn		Cats	Newlyn Recreation Reserve, Newlyn	B&DFA	1900	1932-1978	9	1932, 1935, 1936, 1938, 1949, 1962, 1969, 1970, 1975	Formed Central Highlands FL in 1979
Springbank		Tigers	Wallace Recreation Reserve, Wallace	BFA	1925	1963-1978	6	1964, 1965, 1966, 1967, 1968, 1972	Formed Central Highlands FL in 1979
Waubra		Roos	Waubra Recreation Reserve, Waubra	LFL	1910	1975-1978	0	-	Formed Central Highlands FL in 1979
Wendouree		Swans	C.E. Brown Reserve, Wendouree	BDFL	1920s	1973-1978	1	1977	Formed Central Highlands FL in 1979

=== Former ===
Club	Colours	Nickname	Home Ground	Former League	Est.	Years in CDFL	CDFL Senior Premierships		Fate
Club	Colours	Nickname	Home Ground	Former League	Est.	Years in CDFL	Total	Years	Fate
Allendale			Allendale Reserve, Allendale	CJFA		1936	0	-	Folded after 1936 season
Burrumbeet			Burrumbeet Lake Park, Burrumbeet	B&DFA	1910s	1940	0	-	Moved to Ballarat District FL in 1946
Campbelltown				SJFA	1920s	1931-1937	0	-	Moved to Maryborough District FL in 1938
Creswick Forestry			Doug Lindsay Reserve, Creswick	–	1946	1946-1949	0	-	Folded after 1949 season
Daylesford		Demons	Victoria Park, Daylesford	MDFA	1877	1933-1938	0	-	Entered recess in 1939, re-formed in Castlemaine District FL in 1948
Daylesford United			Victoria Park, Daylesford	D&DFL		1947	0	-	Folded after 1947 season
Loddon Valley				D&DFL		1951	0	-	Returned to Daylesford & District FL in 1952
Malmsbury	Dark with light MFC monogram		Malmsbury Recreation Reserve, Malmsbury	CDFA	1879	1955	0	-	Moved to Riddell District FL in 1956
Miners Rest			Miners Rest Recreation Reserve, Miners Rest	B&DFA		1940	0	-	Folded after 1940 season
Newstead			Newstead Recreation Reserve, Newstead	CDFL	1881	1931-1934	1	1933	Returned to Castlemaine District FL in 1935
Sebastopol		Burras	Marty Busch Reserve, Sebastopol	BFL	1893	1939	1	1939	Merged with South Ballarat to form South-Sebastopol in Ballarat FL in 1940
Smeaton			Smeaton Football Ground, Smeaton	SJFA, BFL	1910s	1931-1940, 1946-1953	5	1931, 1937, 1946, 1947, 1948	Played in Ballarat FL in 1944-45. Folded after 1953 season
RSL				–	1946	1946-1947	0	-	Moved to Ballarat District FL in 1948

== Premierships ==
	Clunes DFA: Senior Football - Grand Final Scores					
Year	Premiers	Score	Runner up	Score	Venue	Gate / Comments
Clunes District Football Association
1931	Smeaton	12.8 - 80	Clunes	11.11 - 77	Newstead	
1932	Newlyn	6.7 - 43	Clunes	5.8 - 38		
Clunes District Football League
1933	Newstead	7.10 - 52	Bungaree	1.13 - 19	Smeaton	Clunes: 3rd
1934	Clunes	6.15 - 51	Newlyn	5.6 - 36	Daylesford	£59
1935	Newlyn	15.16 - 106	Daylesford	5.4 - 34		
1936	Newlyn	9.19 - 73	Clunes	5.4 - 34		
1937	Smeaton	11.8 - 74	Newlyn	6.10 - 46		
1938	Newlyn	15.9 - 99	Smeaton	11.10 - 76		
1939	Sebastopol	12.18 - 90	Creswick	12.8 - 80		
1940	Creswick	11.11 - 77	Smeaton	10.15 - 75		
1941-45						In recess > WW2
1946	Smeaton	10.12 - 72	Creswick Forestry	8.13 - 61		
1947	Smeaton	12.12 - 84	Creswick Forestry	9.10 - 64		Clunes: 3rd
1948	Smeaton	9.12 - 66	Newlyn	6.8 - 44		
1949	Newlyn	13.17 - 95	Hepburn	8.8 - 56		
1950	Creswick	10.3 - 63	Clunes	4.10 - 34		
1951	Clunes	7.9 - 51	Bungaree	5.6 - 36		
1952	Learmonth	8.9 - 57	Bungaree	4.7 - 31		
1953	Clunes	11.6 - 72	Bungaree	7.14 - 56		
1954	Bungaree	9.12 - 66	Clunes	5.14 - 44		
1955	Learmonth	13.9 - 87	Bungaree	11.13 - 79		
1956	Bungaree	5.7 - 37	Clunes	4.2 - 26		
1957	Bungaree	12.7 - 79	Clunes	6.8 - 54		
1958	Clunes	6.11 - 47	Bungaree	3.11 - 29		
1959	Bungaree	16.7 - 103	Creswick	6.6 - 42		
1960	Clunes	16.9 - 105	Creswick	11.4 - 70		
1961	Creswick	9.11 - 65	Newlyn	5.7 - 37		
1962	Newlyn	7.10 - 52	Creswick	4.7 - 31		
1963	Clunes	10.17 - 77	Koreweinguboora	7.8 - 50		
1964	Springbank	12.7 - 79	Clunes	7.9 - 51		
1965	Springbank	10.12 - 72	Clunes	10.9 - 69		
1966	Springbank	10.10 - 70	Clunes	7.7 - 49		
1967	Springbank	15.9 - 99	Clunes	6.10 - 46		
1968	Springbank	10.13 - 73	Creswick	10.9 - 69		
1969	Newlyn	13.5 - 83	Creswick	11.12 - 78		
1970	Newlyn	18.11 - 119	Bungaree	8.10 - 58		
1971	Bungaree	12.7 - 79	Creswick	6.6 - 42		
1972	Springbank	13.15 - 93	Bungaree	12.17 - 89		
1973	Bungaree	18.14 - 122	Wendouree	7.12 - 54		
1974	Creswick	11.15 - 81	Bungaree	4.3 - 27		
1975	Newlyn	18.23 - 131	Bungaree	9.10 - 64		
1976	Bungaree	17.14 - 116	Springbank	16.12 - 108		
1977	Wendouree	10.19 - 79	Learmonth	11.9 - 75		
1978	Clunes	9.15 - 69	Newlyn	10.9 - 69		Drawn G Final
1978	Clunes	20.5 - 125	Newlyn	7.11 - 53		G Final Reply
1979: Clunes DFL & Ballarat / Bacchus Marsh DFL merged to form the Central Highlands FNL
Year	Premiers	Score	Runner Up	Score	Venue	Gate/Comments
