= Creswick Football Netball Club =

Australian rules football and netball club

Creswick FNC

Names
- Full name: Creswick Football Netball Club
- Nickname: Wickers
- Club song: "Oh we're from Creswick town"

2023 season
- After finals: N/A
- Home-and-away season: 13th

Club details
- Founded: 1869; 156 years ago
- Colours: black white red
- Competition: Central Highlands FL
- Coach: Paul Borchers
- Premierships: (14): 1894, 1907, 1914, 1915, 1919, 1923, 1925, 1926, 1931, 1940, 1950, 1961, 1974, 1987
- Ground: Doug Lindsay Reserve, Creswick (2012-present)
- Former ground: Hammon Park (1869-2011)

Uniforms
Home

Other information
- Official website: Creswick FNC website

The Creswick Football Netball Club is an Australian rules football and netball club that plays in the Central Highlands Football League and is based in the town of Creswick, Victoria.

== History ==
The Creswick Football Club was founded in 1869, with Mr. J Wighton elected as President.

Creswick's first recorded game was July 24 that same year against Kingston, with the result being a 0-0 draw.

The club played in 1876 against Clunes and Daylesford, winning both games 1 goal to 0. Between 1869 and 1914, the name of the league where the Wickers played changed almost yearly but the league was often known as the 'Challenge Cup'. There was no football between 1870 and 1875 due to floods.

In 1878, the Ballarat Caledonia FC played the Creswick Hill Camp FC in Creswick, with Creswick winning four goals to nil.

In 1880, Creswick FC President was, Mr. Thomas Cooper (MLA).

The Creswick District Football Association was reformed in 1914, with Creswick joined by clubs from Dean, Smeaton, Newlyn and Allendale & Broomfield. Creswick won the 1914 premiership from Newlyn, and repeated the dose in 1915.

There was a suspension of football in the league due to World War I which lasted from 1916 to 1918, with the league ultimately ceasing existence in early 1935.

In 1922, Creswick: 12.9 - 81 defeated North Melbourne: 9.15 - 69 and Mr. Herbert Packham was voted the most popular footballer at Creswick.

Creswick joined the Ballarat First Rate Association in 1929 and lost the first semi final in 1930 and were premiers of the Ballarat & District Football Association in 1931, prior to joining the Clunes Football Association from 1932 to 1940, while fielding a seconds team in the Creswick Association.

Creswick's ground hosted what turned out to be the last CDFA grand final between Springmount and Allendale in 1934.

In 1941, Creswick went into recess, where World War II was the cause of no football from 1941 to 1945.

Creswick shifted back to the Clunes competition in 1950 where they stayed until 1978 before joining the newly-formed Central Highlands Football League as a founding member.

They are currently affiliated with the CHFL and continue to field junior and senior football and netball teams. Creswick relocated its home ground of 143 years at Hammon Park to a new venue at Doug Lindsay Reserve in 2012.

Football Club Timeline

- 1890 - 1891: Club active, but no official competition matches.
- 1892 - 1893: Clunes, Allendale & Daylesford Football Association
- 1894 - 1896: Creswick District Football Association
- 1897 - 1900: Allendale District Football Association
- 1901 - 1915: Creswick District Football Association
- 1916 - 1918: Club in recess due to World War One
- 1919 - 1921: Creswick District Football Association
- 1922 - Creswick Junior Football Association.
- 1922 - Ballarat District Football Association
- 1923 - 1928: Creswick District Football Association
- 1929 - 1930: Ballarat First Rate Football Association
- 1931 - Ballarat District Football Association
- 1932 - 1940: Clunes District Football Association
- 1941 - 1945: Club in recess due to World War Two
- 1946 - 1949: Ballarat Football League - B. Grade
- 1950 - 1978: Clunes Football League
- 1979 - 2019: Central Highlands Football League
- 2020 - Club in recess due to COVID-19
- 2021 - 2024: Central Highlands Football League

== Football Premierships ==
Seniors

- Creswick District Football Association:
  - 1894, 1907, 1914, 1915, 1919, 1923, 1925, 1926
- Ballarat District Football Association
  - 1931
- Clunes Football Association:
  - 1940
- Clunes Football League:
  - 1950, 1961, 1974

Reserves

- Creswick District Football League
  - 1933 - Creswick Rovers FC

Juniors

- Creswick District Junior Football Association
  - 1902 - North Creswick
- Clunes Football League
  - 1964 - Creswick: 7.5 - 47 d Learmonth: 1.3 - 9

Under 18's

- Clunes Football League
  - 1968 - Creswick: 5.12 - 42 d Bungaree: 5.6 - 36

Central Highlands Football League

- Seniors
  - 1987
- Reserves
  - 1981, 1986, 1987, 1988, 2019
- Under 18:
  - 1979, 1990, 1995, 2006
- Under 15:
  - 1985, 1986, 1992,1993, 1995, 2003, 2008, 2011, 2015

== League Best & Fairest Winners ==
Senior Football

- Central Highlands Football League
  - 1981 - Peter Muller: 20 votes
  - 1986 - David Jenkins: 26

== League Goalkicking Award Winners ==
Senior Football

- Clunes Football League (1932-1978)
  - 1968 - Capuano
  - 1971 - G Kohn 78
- Central Highlands Football League (1979 - current)
  - 1987 - Darren Kubeek: 105 goals
  - 1992 - Jason Yean: 91

== VFL / AFL players ==
Year - Debut season

- 1925 - Dinny Heagney - Geelong
- 1927 - Jack Wunhym - Footscray
- 1940 - Jim Mooring - Carlton
- 1946 - Des Bell - Melbourne
- 1951 - John McDonald - Hawthorn
- 1956 - Jimmy Stephenson - St Kilda
- 1965 - Brian Hepper - Fitzroy
- 1966 - Greg Dowd - Footscray
- 1980 - Eric Clarke - St Kilda
- 1981 - Peter Huntley - St Kilda
- 1987 - Ron Gladman - St Kilda
- 1994 - Matthew Capuano - North Melbourne, St Kilda.

== Creswick District Football Association ==
Creswick FC played in the following football competitions between 1892 and 1934, with the competition name changing their title a number of times.

In 1904, there was a four team local football competition between - Allendale, Clementston Creswick and Lawrence.

In 1906, the Creswick DFA comprised the following eight clubs: Allendale, Lawrence, Long Point, Mount Prospect, Newlyn, North Creswick, Rocky Lead and Springmount.

When the Creswick DFL folded in 1935, the remaining clubs joined the following local competitions - Allendale joined the Clunes Football League, Springmount - Daylesford & DFA. Unsure what happened to the Creswick Rovers, Eganstown and Kingston Football Clubs in 1935.

	Creswick DFA: Senior Football - Grand Final Scores					
Year	Premiers	Score	Runner up	Score	Venue	Gate / Comments
1892 - 1893: Clunes, Allendale & Daylesford DFA: Senior Football - Grand Final Scores
1892	Allendale					
1893	Eganstown	1.1 - 7	Clementson	1.0 - 6	Allendale	
1894 - 1896: Creswick DFA: Senior Football - Grand Final Scores
1894	Creswick	2.7 - 19	Allendale	0.1 - 1	Ballarat	
1895	Allendale		Clementston		Allendale	Sloan Bros Silver Cup
1896	?					
1897 - 1900: Allendale DFA: Senior Football - Grand Final Scores
1897	Allendale		Clementston			
1898	Allendale Rovers	3.4 - 16	Clementston Snorters	1.6 - 12		
1899						
1900						
Creswick DFA: Senior Football - Grand Final Scores
1901	North Creswick	defeated	Broomfield	by 8 points	Newlyn	
1902	?					
1903	?					
1904	North Creswick		?			
1905	?					
1906	?					
1907	Creswick	5.5 - 35	Allendale	1.7 - 13	Creswick	
1908	?					
1909	Newlyn		Daylesford			
	Creswick & Allendale DFA: Senior Football - Grand Final Scores					
1910	?					
1911	?					
1912	Broomfield/Allendale	2.4 - 16	Newlyn	1.7 - 13	Allendale	7/7
1913	Newlyn	1.6 - 12	Creswick	1.5 - 11	Allendale	
	Creswick & DFA: Senior Football - Grand Final Scores					
1914	Creswick	2.8 - 20	Newlyn	3.1 - 19	Allendale	£13
1915	Creswick	5.6 - 36	Newlyn	3.3 - 21	Allendale	£6/7s/8d
1916-18						In recess > WW1
1919	Creswick					
1920	Newlyn	4.5 - 29	Creswick	2.7 - 19	Newlyn	£49/1/3
1921						
1922						Creswick played in Ballarat DFA in'22
1923	Creswick	4.5 - 29	Dean	2.2 - 14		
1924	Bungaree	6.9 - 45	Newlyn	2.1 - 13		
1925	Creswick	6.5 - 41	Bungaree	5.5 - 35		
1926	Creswick	3.4 - 16	Clunes	2.5 - 17		
1927	Newlyn	6.3 - 39	Creswick	6.2 - 38		
1928	Newlyn	7.6 - 48	Creswick	6.10 - 46		
1932	Clunes Juniors	5.10 - 40	Creswick Junors	2.9 - 21		
1933	Creswick Rovers	5.4 - 34	Clunes Imperial	1.11 - 17	Creswick	
1934	Springmount	6.6 - 42	Allendale	2.8 - 20	Creswick	
1935						Creswick DFA went into recess
