= Daylesford & District Football League =

Australian rules football league

The Daylesford & District Football League was an Australian rules football league based around the town of Daylesford, Victoria.

== History ==
The Daylesford District Football Association was formed in April, 1914 from the following football clubs - Bullarto, Musk Vale, Star Rovers (Daylesford) and Wombat Hill.

The Association ran for only two years just prior to World War One in 1914 and 1915.

In August 1946, Port Melbourne Football Association, 14.3 - 87 defeated Daylesford DFA, 7.9 - 51.

== Clubs ==
=== Final ===
Club	Colours	Nickname	Home Ground	Former League	Est.	Years in D&DFL	D&DFL Senior Premierships		Fate
Club	Colours	Nickname	Home Ground	Former League	Est.	Years in D&DFL	Total	Years	Fate
Daylesford reserves		Demons	Victoria Park, Daylesford		1877	1952-1954	0	-	Joined Ballarat FL B grade in 1955
Gordon-Egerton		Eagles	Mount Egerton Recreation Reserve, Mount Egerton	BFA	1890s	1951-1954	0	-	Recess between 1955-61, re-formed in Ballarat District FL in 1962
Korweinguboora		Bulldogs	Korweinguboora Recreation Reserve, Spargo Creek	BFA	1920s	1927-1930, 1939-1940, 1951-1954	0	-	Recess between 1931-38. Played in Bungaree FA in 1949-50. Moved to Ballarat District FL in 1955
Loddon Valley (Lyonville 1939-40)				CDFL		1932-1937, 1939-1940, 1952-1954	1	1932	Played in Clunes District FL in 1951. Folded after 1954 season
Malmsbury	Dark with light MFC monogram		Malmsbury Recreation Reserve, Malmsbury	CDFA	1879	1953-1954	2	1953, 1954	Moved to Clunes District FL in 1955

=== Former ===
Club	Colours	Nickname	Home Ground	Former League	Est.	Years in D&DFL	D&DFL Senior Premierships		Fate
Club	Colours	Nickname	Home Ground	Former League	Est.	Years in D&DFL	Total	Years	Fate
Bullarto				–		1914-1915, 1922, 1926, 1930-1931	3	1914, 1915, 1926	Recess between 1915-21 and 1923-25. Folded after 1931 season
Daylesford Fire Brigade			Victoria Park, Daylesford	–		1915, 1932	0	-	Folded after 1932 season
Daylesford United			Victoria Park, Daylesford	–		1933-1937	1	1935	Recess between 1938-46, re-formed in Clunes District FL in 1947
Dunnstown		Towners	Dunnstown Recreation Reserve, Dunnstown	BFA	1894	1952	1	1952	Moved to Ballarat District FL in 1953
East Trentham				–		1922	0	-	1923-25 unknown, joined Barfold FA in 1926
Eganstown				–		1931-1933	0	-	Folded after 1933 season
Glenlyon			Glenlyon Recreation Reserve, Glenlyon	–		1932-1940	1	1936	Folded after 1940 season
Hepburn		Burras	Hepburn Recreation Reserve, Hepburn	–	1919	1921-1940	5	1930, 1934, 1937, 1938, 1939	Moved to Clunes District FL in 1947
Militia				–	1938	1938-1939	0	-	Folded after 1939 season
Musk Vale				–		1914-1915	0	-	Folded after 1915 season
Springmount				CJFA		1935-1936	0	-	Moved to Bungaree FA in 1937
Star Rovers			Victoria Park, Daylesford	–		1914, 1930-1931	0	-	Recess between 1915-29. Folded after 1932 season
Textiles				–	1938	1938-1940	1	1940	Folded after 1940 season
Trentham		Grasshoppers	Trentham Recreation Reserve, Trentham	MDFL	1892	1933-1936	1	1933	Moved to Castlemaine District FA in 1937
Victoria Park			Victoria Park, Daylesford	–		1921-1926, 1931-1932	2	1935, 1931	Recess between 1927-30. Folded after 1932 season
Wombat Hill				–		1914-1915, 1921-1928	3	1921, 1924, 1927	Recess between 1916-20. Folded after 1928 season
Woollen Mills						1930-1931	0	-	Folded after 1931 season

== Premierships ==
Year	Premiers	Score	Runner up	Score	Venue	Gate / Comments
Daylesford & District Football Association
1914	Bullarto	4.9 - 33	Musk Vale	1.1 - 7	Bullarto	
1915	Bullarto	2.7 - 19	Wombat Hill	0.0 - 0	Victoria Park	
1916-20	Recess					
Daylesford District Junior Football Association
1921	Wombat Hill	2.4 - 16	Victoria Park	0.2 - 2		
1922	?					
1923	?					
1924	Wombat Hill	4.4 - 28	Victoria Park	1.4 - 10		
1925	Victoria Park	3.2 - 20	Wombat Hill	2.7 - 19		
1926	Bullarto	2.2 - 14	Hepburn	1.3 - 9		
1927	Wombat Hill	6.6 - 42	Korweinguboora	4.4 - 28		
1928	?					Wombat Hill vs Korweinguboora - result unknown
1929	?					
Daylesford & District Football Association
1930	Hepburn	8.13 - 61	Bullarto	2.7 - 19		
1931	Victoria Park	3.2 - 20	Hepburn	2.7 - 19		
1932	Loddon Valley	12.12 - 84	Hepburn	5.7 - 37		
1933	Trentham	9.7 - 61	Loddon Valley	2.2 - 14		
1934	Hepburn	5.6 - 36	Loddon Valley	5.5 - 35		1st Grand Final - Hepburn Premiers:
1934	Loddon Valley	led by 2 goals	Hepburn			2nd Final
1935	Daylesford United	6.11 - 47	Hepburn	4.14 - 38		
1936	Glenlyon	defeated	Hepburn			
1937	Hepburn	7.11 - 53	Glenlyon	6.10 - 46		
1938	Hepburn	11.15 - 81	Glenlyon	7.3 - 45		
1939	Hepburn	12.10 - 82	Korweinguboora	8.7 - 55		
1940	Textiles	10.13 - 73	Glenlyon	2.8 - 20		
1941-51	Recess					
Daylesford & District Football League
1952	Dunnstown	8.17 - 65	Gordon-Egerton	3.9 - 27		
1953	Malmsbury	9.7 - 61	Korweinguboora	9.7 - 61		Drawn grand final
1953	Malmsbury	6.7 - 43	Korweinguboora	5.7 - 37		Replay
1954	Malmsbury	6.10 - 46	Korweinguboora	6.9 - 45		
