= Learmonth Football Club =

Learmonth

Names
- Full name: Learmonth Football Netball Club
- Nickname(s): Lakies

2018 season
- After finals: DNQ
- Home-and-away season: 10th

Club details
- Founded: 1889; 136 years ago
- Colours: blue gold
- Competition: Central Highlands FL
- Ground(s): Learmonth Oval

Uniforms
Home

Other information
- Official website: learmonthfnc.com.au

The Learmonth Football Netball Club, nicknamed the Lakies, is an Australian rules football and netball club based in the town of Learmonth, Victoria. The club's colours are yellow and blue and play in the Central Highlands Football League.

== History ==
The Learmonth FC was founded at the turn of the 19th century and began its first years of existence by playing social matches against the neighbouring towns of Burrumbeet, Coghill's Creek and Waubra. These games extended further out to Lexton and Ballarat even before the foundation of the Learmonth & District Football Association in 1912 with Burrumbeet and Coghill's Creek winning the first premierships. Football in the LDFA was suspended from 1914 to 1918 due to World War I but the sport resumed in 1919 and the Lakies won their first flag the following year in 1920. They won two more flags during the 1920s, being the runner up five times and winning four senior flags during the 1930s.

After the 1933 season, the LDFA disbanded and the Lakies played in the Burrumbeet & District Football Association for six years before making another move to the Clunes Football League after the war. Upon joining the Clunes league, Learmonth's existing red and blue colours clashed with the Hepburn Football Club who were another new entrant and joined the league at an earlier date. Learmonth decided to change the strip to a royal blue background with a gold sash and changed again to a gold V in the late 1960s.

Learmonth FC won their first Clunes FL premiership in 1952 and they won again in 1955. But the 1960s and 1970s saw a major downfall in performance, despite managing to make the Finals in 1977 finishing fifth and making the Grand Final and losing to new club Wendouree by 3 points. The Lakies made another Grand Final in 1994 and coming from a lower spot from the final four but lost to the undefeated Dunnstown Football Club.

In 1979, the Clunes Football League and the Ballarat Bacchus Marsh Football League amalgamated to form the current Central Highlands Football League where Learmonth is currently playing. Beaufort and Daylesford joined the CHFL in 1994 and 2006 and Rokewood-Corindhap, Skipton, Carngham-Linton and Illabarook (now Smythesdale) joined in 2011 from the former Lexton Plains Football League. The Learmonth Lakies FC still are a founding member of the CHFL and the club still continues to field junior and senior football and netball teams.

== A-Grade Premierships ==
- Learmonth Football Association
  - 1920, 1921, 1929, 1931, 1932, 1933
- Burrumbeet Football Association
  - 1935
- Clunes Football League
  - 1952, 1955

== Bibliography ==
- History of Football in the Ballarat District by John Stoward - ISBN 978-0-9805929-0-0
