= Skipton Football Netball Club =

Skipton FNC

Names
- Full name: Skipton Football Netball Club
- Nickname: Emus

2025 season
- After finals: 1st: Premiers
- Home-and-away season: 3rd
- Leading goalkicker: Rhys Monument (47)
- Best and fairest: Jake Maddock

Club details
- Founded: 1874; 152 years ago
- Colours: red white navy
- Competition: Central Highlands FL
- President: Kiernan Molloy
- Coach: Mitch Walsh
- Premierships: 14
- Ground: Skipton Recreation Reserve

Uniforms
Home

Other information
- Official website: skiptonfnc.com.au

The Skipton Football Netball Club, nicknamed the Emus, are an Australian rules football and netball club based in the town of Skipton, Victoria, currently playing in the Central Highlands Football League.

== History ==
The earliest recorded Australian Rules Football match at the Skipton Reserve, was on Saturday, 4th July 1874, when twenty residents of Skipton were captained by Mr Herbert Anderson and twenty residents of Streatham, under the captaincy of Mr Andrew Chirnside Junior.

The Skipton Football Club's earliest recorded match dates back to 1873-1874 against Streatham on a field east of the Emus' current Skipton Recreation Reserve and played against teams from the towns of Carngham, Haddon and Linton. A few years later, the recreation reserve was fenced with grass planted and games were played against more districts such as Camperdown and Lismore, with Ballarat official umpires officiating the matches.

Skipton had a very strong team during this era and is believed that they had the best record of any Australian rules football club in Australia, playing for fifteen years without losing a game and for eighteen years without losing a home game.

In 1888, there was a cup gifted to the Skipton Football Club by a Charles Wilson and the Skipton FC set up a local football competition between the following clubs - Beautfort, Carngham, Lake Bolac, Linton, Rokewood, Scaresdale and Smythesdale.

In Skipton's early years still, football games were often played in the form of scratch matches, with some of the earliest competition matches dating back to 1890 when Skipton played against clubs from Ararat, Lake Bolac and Streatham and competed for the Streatham trophy of twenty sovereigns. That year, in the 1890 final, Skipton and Ararat competed against each other at Streatham and Ararat won the game by a goal but Skipton were successful the following year, easily defeating Beaufort in 1891 to win the Streatham Trophy donated by T H Brown.

On several occasions, Skipton played fully representative teams from Ballarat and their undefeated home run was ended when a Ballarat team reportedly beat them after two drawn matches.

Football from 1895 to 1900 saw Skipton continuing to play scratch matches against Carngham, Happy Valley and Linton and the club played mainly against the surrounding towns for the next couple of years. In 1908, Skipton defeated Beaufort in the decider in a triangular competition that had a team from Stockyard Hill. A football association was formed between the clubs of Skipton, Carngham, Linton and Scarsdale in 1909 that lasted until World War I. During the war there was no competition but the Skipton football team was still around to support a Queen Carnival in assistance of patriotic funding.

In 1919, the Linton & District Football Association was founded and Skipton, Carngham and Linton played in the league and the Scarsdale club rejoined later. Over the years of competition in the LDFL, football fever was developing hatred and bitter rivalry between the local towns. Skipton won LDFL premierships in 1921, 1923 and 1924, beating Linton, Carngham and Linton.

The competition was renamed the Linton-Scarsdale Association in 1925, with the addition of teams from the towns of Lismore and Bradvale. The name was changed again in 1927, to the Linton-Skipton Association after Carngham and Scarsdale transferred to the Rokewood-Cape Clear Association. Skipton ended the 1927 and 1929 seasons runner up to Lismore.

The Emus joined the Rokewood-Cape Clear Association in 1930 and finished runner up to Illabarook in 1931 and 1932, which became the Cape Clear-Carngham Association from 1934, then the Linton-Carngham Association from 1936, with Skipton again ending the season runner up to Illabarook.

In 1937, Skipton won a closely contested grand final against Carngham but the tables were turned in 1938 when Carngham beat Skipton. After 1940, the association went into recess due to World War II.

After football resumed in the area in 1946, the Skipton Emus finished the season runner up to Carngham but went through 1949 undefeated and made it to the Grand Final, only to lose to Carngham by one point. In the last two years of the Linton-Carngham Football League, Skipton finished runner up two consecutive seasons; 1951 to Illabarook and 1952 to Carngham. Skipton Football Club joined the Western Plains Football League in 1953 but did not reach a grand final until 1996, in a close loss by six points to Derrinallum.

The 1999 season saw the Emus transfer to the Lexton Plains Football League and won senior premierships in 2001, 2003, 2005, 2009 and 2010. The Lexton Plains Football League's final season of existence was the 2010 season which was capped with the Skipton Football Club fielding teams in grand finals and coming away with the win for A-Grade, B-Grade and U17 premierships. A-Grade beat Lexton 16.15.111 to 3.8.26.

In 2011, the Skipton Emus moved to the Central Highlands Football League that they are currently affiliated with. In order to avoid a jumper clash with Bungaree, a new guernsey, red with a navy blue yoke and white vee was created. This jumper incorporated designs from two previous jumpers worn. These being red with a white vee as worn in the Western Plains Football League and navy blue with a red yoke in the Lexton Plains Football League.

Skipton made finals for the first time in 2019, losing to Hepburn by 33 points in an elimination final. From 2022 to 2024, Skipton returned to the finals, but only ever made it as far as a preliminary final in 2024, losing to eventual premiers Daylesford by 25 points.

In 2025, Skipton finished 3rd after the home and away season. They defeated Gordon by 38 points in the first week of finals, then in the preliminary final against minor premier Dunnstown they were victorious by 17. Skipton played Daylesford in the Grand Final at Mars Stadium, where after a very even 1st half, proved too good in the later part of the game to win by 31 points.

== Club song ==
We are the red, white and blue,

We are the good old red, white and blue,

We're the team that comes from miles around,

We'll play them on our home or any ground,

Some come to cheer us,

While others fear us,

When they are near us,

We are the good old red, white and blue,

We are the Skipton football team.

== Football Premierships ==
Senior Football

- Wilson Cup
  - 1888,
  - 1889 - Skipton: 6.10 - 46 d Lismore: 1.2 - 8
- T H Brown Trophy
  - 1891 - Skipton: 5.9 - 39 d Beautfort: 0.0 - 0
- A Local Competition
  - 1908 - ?
- Linton & District Football League
  - 1921 - Skipton: 5.12 - 42 d Linton: 4.5 - 29
  - 1923 - Skipton: 4.5 - 29 d Carngham: 1.5 - 11
  - 1924 - Skipton: 5.3 - 33 d Linton: 4.2 - 26
- Linton-Carngham Football Association
  - 1937 - Skipton: 10.14 - 74 d Carngham: 9.9 - 63
- Lexton Plains Football League
  - 2001 - Skipton: 15.17 - 107 d Rokewood Corindhap: 6.16 - 52
  - 2003 - Skipton: 12.16 - 88 d Carngham Linton: 10.10 - 70
  - 2005 - Skipton: 22.18 - 150 d Carngham Linton: 9.9 - 63
  - 2009 - Skipton: 17.9 - 111 d Carngham Linton: 10.9 - 69
  - 2010 - Skipton: 16.15 - 111 d Lexton: 3.8 - 26
- Central Highlands Football League
  - 2025 - Skipton: 15.12 - 102 d Daylesford: 10.11 - 71

== VFL/AFL ==
- 1963 - Graeme Wise - Melbourne
- 1983 - Dean Chiron - St Kilda , Footscray, Melbourne

VFL / AFL players that were born in Skipton

- 1897 - Ted Greeves - Geelong

== Bibliography ==
- History of Football in the Ballarat District by John Stoward - ISBN 978-0-9805929-0-0
