= Learmonth Uniting Church =

Closed Uniting church in Learmonth, Victoria, Australia

- Learmonth Presbyterian Church
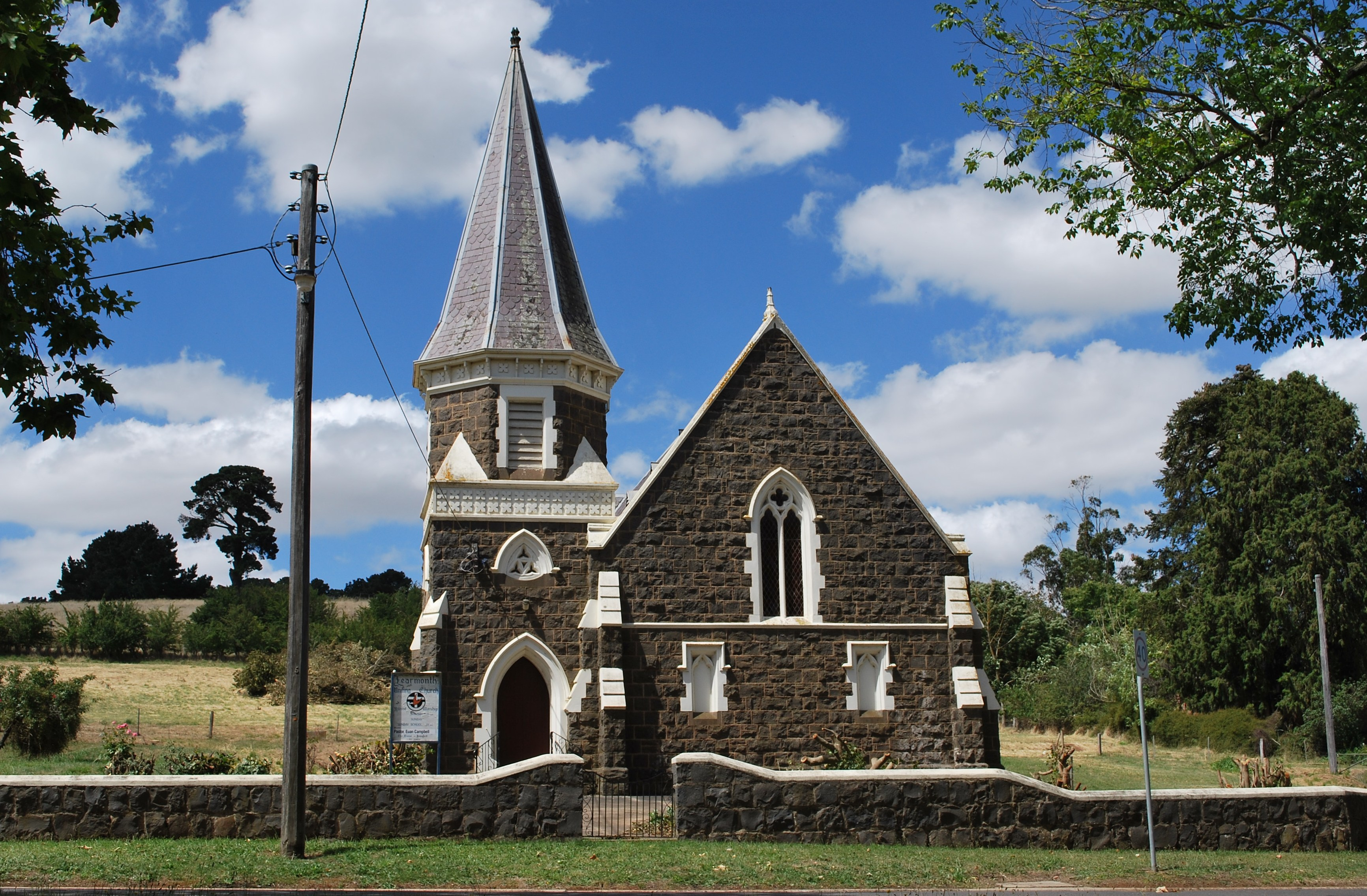
- Learmonth Uniting Church
- Learmonth Uniting Church
- 37.4232985°S 143.718488°E
- Address: 316 High Street, Learmonth, Victoria
- Country: Australia
- Denomination: Uniting (since 1977)

History
- Status: Closed (private residence)

Architecture
- Architect: Henry R. Caselli
- Architectural type: Church
- Style: Victorian Gothic
- Years built: 1875-1876
- Completed: 1876
- Closed: 2025

Learmonth Uniting Church (formerly Learmonth Presbyterian Church) is a historic former Presbyterian-turned-Uniting church located in the town of Learmonth, Victoria, Australia. The bluestone church, built in 1876 to replace an older church, is recognised as one of the key historic religious buildings of Learmonth's nineteenth-century heritage.

== History ==
The local Presbyterian community in the Learmonth district organised on 13 March 1857 during a period of rapid rural settlement in western Victoria, with a meeting being held at the farm of Robertson and Ross at Burrumbeet to plan the erection of a church, manse and school in connection with the Free Church of Scotland for the burgeoning local population. A committee was formed and a site on the north side of Lake Learmonth was chosen for the church and manse.

A timber Presbyterian church and manse were erected in early 1858, with the first services conducted from the new building. Rev. George Mackie was instrumental in organising the congregation and served as its first minister. By 1859 the Learmonth congregation was holding regular services and connected with nearby charges in the region. The first communion service was held in May 1859, with elders appointed and a formal congregation established.

As the township prospered, plans were made for a permanent stone church. The foundation stone for the present bluestone church was laid by Sir Samuel Wilson of Ercildoune on 24 November 1875. The new building replaced the original timber structure and was opened on 19 March 1876, by which time the construction debt of £1,250 had been nearly paid off. Architectural credit includes the involvement of Henry R. Caselli as architect and the building was financed partly through local patronage and congregation effort.

In 1890 a new manse for the minister was built, and in 1907 a stone Sunday School building was added at the rear of the church. During the 1950s a stone fence and wrought iron gates were constructed using stone and materials donated by Mr Max Griffin and others.

The congregation continued to use the church throughout the first three-quarters of the twentieth century. In 1977 the last service under the Presbyterian name was held as the church became part of the Uniting Church of Australia.

The building continued in use for Uniting Church services until at least 2025. The church was sold on 29 July 2025 for $700,000.
