= Danny Frawley =

Australian rules footballer, coach and media personality (1963-2019)

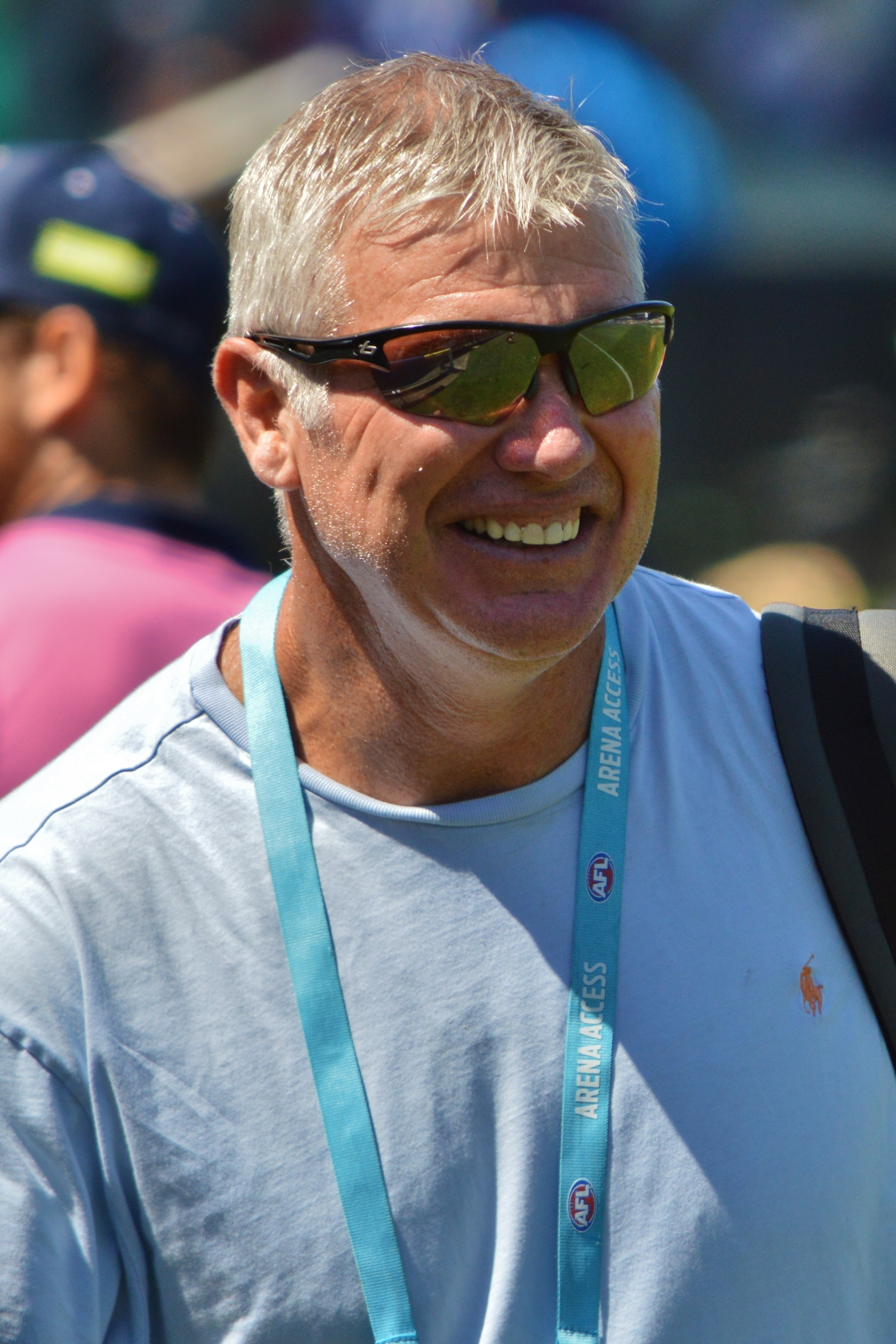
- Frawley during a pre-season match in 2017

Personal information
- Full name: Daniel Patrick Frawley
- Nickname: Spud
- Born: 8 September 1963; Ballarat, Victoria, Australia
- Died: 9 September 2019 (aged 56); Millbrook, Victoria, Australia
- Original team: Bungaree (CHFL)
- Debut: Round 4, 1984, St Kilda vs. Hawthorn, at Princes Park
- Height: 191 cm (6 ft 3 in)
- Weight: 95 kg (209 lb)
- Position: Full back

Playing career^{1}
Years	Club	Games (Goals)
1984–1995	St Kilda	240 (13)

Representative team honours^{2}
Years	Team	Games (Goals)
1987–1994	Victoria	11 (0)

International team honours^{2}
1987–1990	Australia	6 (2)

Coaching career
Years	Club	Games (W–L–D)
2000–2004	Richmond	113 (45–68–0)
- ^{1} Playing statistics correct to the end of the 1995 season.^{2} Representative statistics correct as of 1994.

Career highlights
- St Kilda Football Club Hall of Fame (inducted 2006); St Kilda captain: 1987–1995; All-Australian team: 1988; St Kilda best and fairest: 1988

Daniel Patrick "Spud" Frawley (8 September 1963 – 9 September 2019) was an Australian rules football player, coach, administrator, commentator and media personality. He played 240 games for the St Kilda Football Club in the Victorian Football League (VFL)/Australian Football League (AFL) from 1984 to 1995, captaining the club for nine seasons, and won All-Australian selection and the St Kilda best and fairest award in 1988. Frawley coached the Richmond Football Club from 2000 to 2004, with his most successful season coming in 2001, when he coached Richmond to a preliminary final. He was chief executive officer of the AFL Coaches Association from 2008 to 2014, and had part-time roles with the Hawthorn Football Club and St Kilda.

Following his coaching career, Frawley was an AFL commentator for Fox Footy, Triple M and 1116 SEN, and also appeared on The Sunday Footy Show on the Nine Network. On television, he is best remembered for his work on the Fox Footy program Bounce, which he co-hosted alongside contemporary Jason Dunstall for over 350 episodes from 2007 to his death in 2019; on radio, he is best remembered for his work on Triple M, most notably his appearances on The Saturday Rub, from 2005 to 2016. Frawley quietly struggled with mental health problems throughout most of his time in football, but he became more open in his later years, leading him to host his own podcast on SEN dedicated to mental health, No Man Should Ever Walk Alone, from 2017 to 2018.

Frawley died by suicide in a single-vehicle car crash in Millbrook, Victoria, on 9 September 2019.

== Early life and family ==
Frawley was educated at St Patrick's College, Ballarat, and played country football for East Ballarat in the Ballarat Football League (BFL) and Bungaree in the Central Highlands Football League (CHFL). He grew up and worked on a potato farm in Bungaree, which led to his nickname of "Spud".

Frawley was the nephew of former Collingwood player Des Tuddenham and the uncle of Melbourne, Hawthorn St Kilda and Current Gold Coast Reserves player James Frawley. His brother Tony was the chief executive officer of AFL Northern Territory from 2005 to 2015.

== Playing career ==
=== St Kilda ===
As of 2023, Frawley is one of only 16 players to play their first 90 games consecutively. Frawley initially played as a forward but soon became a renowned full-back. He captained the St Kilda Football Club for nine seasons over his 240-game playing career from 1984 to 1995. He was the club's best and fairest winner in 1988 and was named in the All-Australian team the same year. He was the longest-serving captain of the St Kilda Football Club. He was inducted into the Saints' hall of fame in 2007.

=== Honours and achievements ===
Individual

- St Kilda Football Club Hall of Fame (inducted 2006)
- St Kilda captain: 1987–1995
- All-Australian team: 1988
- St Kilda best and fairest: 1988
- 2× Australia representative honours in international rules football: 1987, 1990

== Coaching career ==
=== Collingwood Football Club assistant coach (1996–1999) ===
After his retirement from playing, Frawley spent four years as an assistant coach at Collingwood Football Club from 1996 until 1999 under senior coach Tony Shaw.

=== Richmond Football Club senior coach (2000–2004) ===
Frawley became the senior coach of the Richmond Football Club in 2000 when he replaced Jeff Gieschen. In his first year in the 2000 season, Richmond under Frawley just missed out of the finals by finishing ninth. In the 2001 season, he took the Tigers into the finals, where, in the preliminary finals, they were eliminated by the Brisbane Lions, who were the eventual premiers. Under Frawley, the club moved to fourth on the ladder and their first preliminary final since 1995. In the 2002 season, however, Richmond under Frawley struggled and finished 14th. At the start of the 2003 season, the initial signs were positive, with Richmond under Frawley starting with six wins and two losses to start the season; however, the club's on-field performance dropped when they lost 13 of their next 14 matches and finished 13th.

In the 2004 season, Richmond under Frawley kept struggling and finished 16th for the "wooden spoon", which was the last position on the ladder at the time. Midway through the season, Frawley announced that he would resign at the end of the 2004 season. Richmond under Frawley lost their last 14 matches of the 2004 season. Frawley was then replaced by Terry Wallace as Richmond Football Club senior coach.

=== Hawthorn Football Club assistant coach (2008–2014) ===
From 2008 until 2014, Frawley worked at Hawthorn as a part-time assistant coach.

=== St Kilda Football Club assistant coach (2014–2018) ===
He rejoined St Kilda as a backline and key-position assistant coach in November 2014. Later, and until 2018, Frawley was a part-time specialist defence coach at the St Kilda Football Club.

== Post-coaching roles ==
After leaving senior coaching, Frawley was a special commentator for Triple M. In June 2006, he coached a winning Victorian state of origin side in the E. J. Whitten Legends Match and became the chief executive of the AFL Coaches Association.

== Media career and post-football ==
During his playing career, Frawley was a regular cast member on AFL Squadron alongside Garry Lyon. When he transitioned to being a commentator primarily, Frawley was a commentator for Fox Footy and was a co-host of Bounce with Jason Dunstall and Cameron Mooney, as well as a part of the 1116 SEN Footy team on Friday nights and Sunday afternoons. Earlier in his career, he was also involved with the Nine Network and Triple M as a commentator and a regular co-host on The Saturday Rub. He also hosted a Monday night show on SEN called No Man Should Ever Walk Alone on men's health topics including mental health, addiction, and lifestyle.

== Personal life and death ==
Frawley was married to Anita, who made regular appearances on the Fox Footy Channel program Living with Footballers. They had three daughters: Chelsea, Danielle, and Keeley.

On 9 September 2019, a day after his 56th birthday, Frawley died in a single-vehicle car crash in Millbrook, Victoria. The incident occurred shortly after 1:30 pm when his car left the road and struck a tree on Old Melbourne Road between Ryans and Chapmans Roads. He was the only passenger and died at the scene of the crash. The coroner ruled his death a suicide. An examination of his brain nearly a year later found that Frawley had stage two chronic traumatic encephalopathy (CTE), a neurodegenerative disease caused by repeated head injuries; his wife Anita said she had "strongly suspected there was more going on with Danny than straightforward depression".

=== Tributes ===
The Trevor Barker Award, St Kilda's award for best and fairest player, proceeded two nights after Frawley's death and was filled with tributes to him, including speeches from teammates Stewart Loewe and Robert Harvey. The AFL announced that a moment of silence would be observed in Frawley's honour before both semifinals the following weekend (Geelong–West Coast and Brisbane–Greater Western Sydney), with all four teams also wearing black armbands. The Melbourne Storm and Canberra Raiders also observed a moment of silence for Frawley before their NRL qualifying final at AAMI Park. AFL CEO Gillon McLachlan also revealed that it was being considered that the Golden Fist award, an award for best defender that Frawley had famously created on Bounce, should become an official AFL honour. A Change.org petition about the matter had garnered 33,000 signatures in less than 48 hours.

Who was Danny Frawley? He was larger than life. He was the country kid. He was a footballer, he was our skipper, he was a coach, he was a spud farmer, a media personality...he was a husband, he was a dad, he was a brother, he was a friend to many, and he was one of my best mates...and he will always be my hero. When Matt Finnis (St Kilda CEO) then asked me yesterday if I'd like to pay tribute to Danny tonight at the best & fairest, I couldn't answer him...But after an hour or so by myself, I started to think, what would Spud want? What would he do? The answer was pretty obvious. "Put your suit on, roll up your sleeves, and get the bloody job done." That's just who he was.

— Stewart Loewe at the 2019 Trevor Barker Award two days after Frawley's death

Good morning. But it's not really. It's a time where we grapple and fumble around and search for a meaning that's not really there. It's an imprecise morning, one that we spend together and do our best.

Danny Frawley's death is a hammer blow to our community. Watching and reading and listening to all the reactions makes me think of the truism "The love you give is the love you get."

There's no solace at a time like this, but there is a collective embrace, and hopefully Anita and Chelsea, Danielle and Keeley can at least feel it. Danny was a great football person from the grassroots, to the top level. He belonged to many, from Bungaree to St Kilda and beyond.

In the media, he was a tremendous character, in the way that he gave of himself, to enhance your connection or enjoyment, and often at his own expense. He's done that for many years at Crocmedia and, in more recent times, on SEN. He maintained an infectious enthusiasm and vibrancy. It's the sort of thing people say, but you know that it's true, because you watched it and listened to it. When the footy got exciting, he was jumping, metaphorically and literally, all over the broadcast, and he could mangle the language in the most wonderful way. And I think he leaves us with "Yeah nah"...maybe it predates Danny, but he normalised it in our football world.

He was a latter day cyclist, in questionable Lycra, he was a hobby horse breeder, and he was an optimistic golfer. He was a friend to many, and I suspect you will feel that whether you knew him or not.

How footy touched his soul...well, that was evidence in the tears he shed for Teddy Whitten during that lap at the MCG, when he couldn't finish that famous induction speech for Tony Lockett and as he choked up honouring Trevor Barker just this year as he took his place in the Hall of Fame.

And now, those tears are for Spud.

[Plays When the Saints Go Marching In]

They play that in the terraces at St Kilda games, and I suspect the next time it's done, it'll have additional poignancy and carry the images...

— Gerard Whateley opening Whateley on SEN the day after Frawley's death

Both radio stations Frawley had worked at — Triple M and SEN — broadcast a special joint edition of The Saturday Rub in Frawley's honour co-hosted by friends and colleagues James Brayshaw, Brian Taylor, Damian Barrett and Garry Lyon.

A private but broadcast memorial was held for Frawley, followed by the hearse travelling to Moorabbin Oval for a lap of honour.

In November 2020, St Kilda and the Victorian and federal governments announced the plans for a $16 million (AUD) Moorabbin Oval centre, including classroom spaces, consultation suites and breakout areas to be named the Danny Frawley Centre for Health and Wellbeing. The centre launched on 1 March 2022, with the attendees including St Kilda greats Loewe and Nick Riewoldt, club CEO Matt Finnis, Frawley's broadcast colleagues Lyon and Jason Dunstall, actor and former St Kilda #1 ticket holder Eric Bana, AFL CEO Gillon McLachlan, Victorian Tourism Minister Martin Pakula and Senator Jane Hume. Frawley's #2 was also retired by the club and hangs in the centre. In January 2021, it was announced that Frawley's nephew James, who had joined St Kilda after a brief retirement at the end of the 2020 season with Hawthorn, would wear the #24 guernsey, which Danny had worn from 1985 to 1987 before switching to #2.

In March 2021, St Kilda announced that their Round 2 game, beginning that season against Melbourne, would be called "Spud's Game: Time 2 Talk" in partnership with Movember to promote mental health. Prior to the match, the game was delayed by two minutes with Frawley's close friends Lyon, Loewe and Tony Lockett paying tribute to Frawley in the middle of the ground and asking for those that were watching to check with their mates with both teams surrounding them and his family watching on.
