= Hepburn Pool =

Historic swimming pool in Hepburn Springs, Victoria, Australia

Coordinates: 37°18′57″S 144°8′26″E

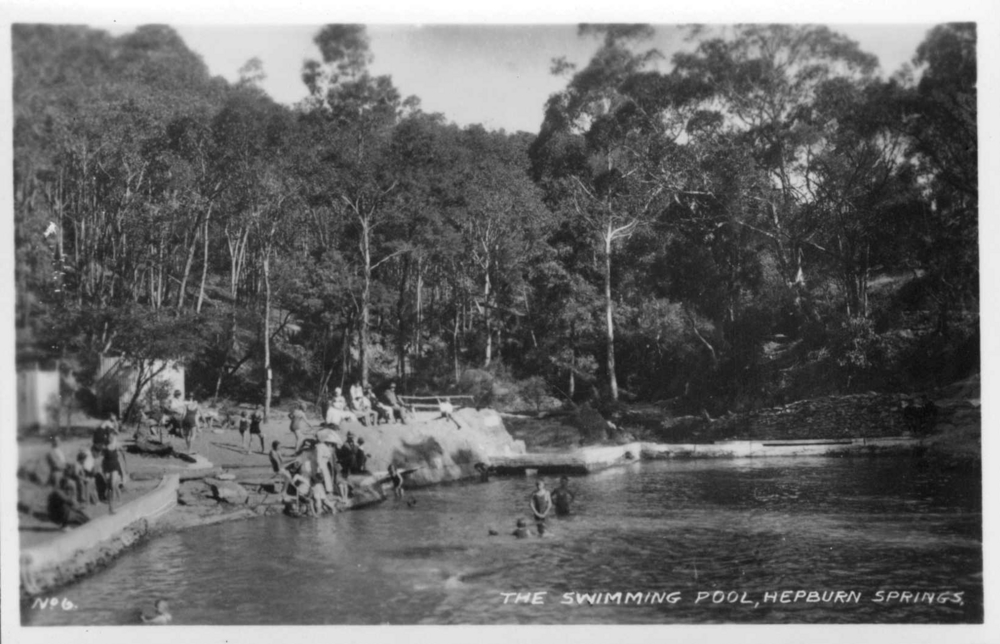
The Swimming Pool, circa 1938.

Hepburn Pool is a historic, pre-Olympic swimming pool built into Spring Creek within the Hepburn Mineral Springs Reserve in Hepburn Springs. It was included on the Victorian Heritage Register following a nomination and comparative analysis of pre Olympic Swimming Pools in Victoria by Lisa Gervasoni.

It was built in the early 1930s for Bellinzona Guest House, which was operated by the Zelman family, prominent Swiss Italian settlers. The pool is created by a concrete weir and drystone walling of a natural basin in Spring Creek, and is surrounded by terraced drystone seating. The weir features an outlet valve which ensures environmental flows into Spring Creek.

The pool was of Olympic size and was an early competition pool which hosted Victorian swimming championships in the 1930s.

The pool ceased operation in 1969 when an Olympic Pool was constructed in Daylesford. The pool filled with silt and in 1993-95 was conserved by volunteers led by Merv Keating of the Savoia Hotel using old photographs to replicate missing features such as seating.

The Pool was named Victoria's Favourite Built Place in 2004 as part of the Victorian Government's involvement in the International Year of the Built Environment.

In 2006 the Victorian Minister for Planning undertook a community consultation project to resolve perceived conflicts between the heritage of the site and Council's fears regarding insurance coverage. In 2007 risk management works, funded by the Department of Sustainability and the Environment commenced.

== Images ==
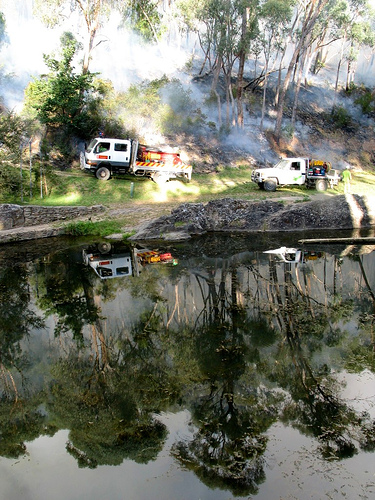
Hepburn Pool

Hepburn Pool

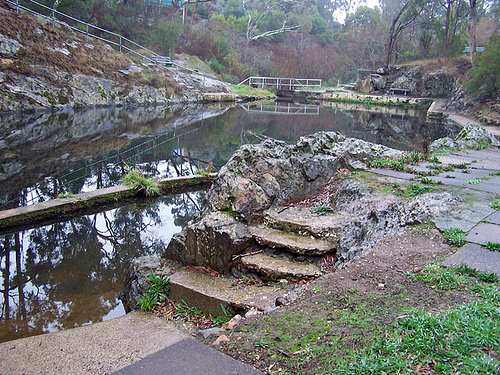
Hepburn Pool
