= Newlyn Football Netball Club =

Australian sports club

Newlyn

Names
- Full name: Newlyn Football Netball Club
- Nickname: Cats

Club details
- Founded: 1900; 125 years ago
- Colours
- Competition: Central Highlands Football League
- Premierships: 18 (1903, 1906, 1907, 1913, 1920, 1927, 1928, 1932, 1935, 1936, 1938, 1949, 1962, 1969, 1970, 1975, 1992, 2003
- Ground: Newlyn Recreation Reserve

Uniforms
Home

Other information
- Official website: newlyncats.com.au

The Newlyn Football Netball Club is an Australian rules football and netball club from Newlyn, Victoria which competes in the Central Highlands Football League. The Cats are one of the founding members of the CHFL.

== History ==
Established in 1900, Newlyn Football Club commenced organised competition the following year in the Creswick District Football Association. Prior to 1932 there were 14 different competitions mainly covering the district around Creswick., winning a total of five premierships, before helping establish the Clunes Football Association in 1931.

Newlyn was a strong combination, Between 1932 and 1938 the team contested six out of seven grand finals, winning in 1932, 1935, 1936 and 1938. Disrupted by WW2 the club claimed a fifth flag in 1949, it took another thirteen years before the club defeated Creswick to win the 1962 flag.

In 1969 the club had its first VFL grown player when David McKay made his debut for Carlton. McKay would play in 263 games and be in four premierships sides.

Locally that year the club won the flag against Springbank by five points. They went back to back the next year with a 61-point win against Bungaree and finally in 1975 they defeated Bungaree again be 1975 by 67 points.

In Clunes Football League last season in 1978, it was one of the most climatic in its history as Newlyn and Clunes played out the competition's only ever grand final draw with Clunes 9.15.69 to Newlyn 10.9.69. Clunes won the replay 20.5.125 to Newlyn 7.11.53.

Two Premierships have been won in the Central Highlands Football League, in 1992 against Dunnstown and then eleven years later in 2003 against Buninyong.

The Sewell brothers, Brad and Myles both went on to play in stronger competitions, Brad played 200 games for Hawthorn while his brother Myles won the J. J. Liston Trophy while playing for North Ballarat in the VFL.

== Football Premierships ==
Seniors

- Donated Trophies
  - 1903, 1906, 1907
- Creswick District Football Association
  - 1913, 1920, 1927, 1928,
- Clunes Football League
  - 1932, 1935, 1936, 1938, 1949, 1962, 1969, 1970, 1975,
- Central Highlands Football League
  - 1992, 2003

== VFL/AFL players ==
- David McKay - Carlton
- Brad Sewell - Hawthorn
- Sean Willmott - Essendon

== Bibliography ==
- History of Football in the Ballarat District by John Stoward – ISBN 978-0-9805929-0-0
