= Des Bell =

Australian rules footballer (born 1923)

Personal information
- Full name: Desmond Clyde Bell
- Born: 23 May 1923 (age 103); Creswick, Victoria, Australia
- Original team: Creswick
- Height: 180 cm (5 ft 11 in)
- Weight: 79 kg (174 lb)

Playing career^{1}
Years	Club	Games (Goals)
1946–48	Melbourne	7 (4)
- ^{1} Playing statistics correct to the end of 1948.

Desmond Clyde Bell (born 23 May 1923) is a former Australian rules footballer who played with Melbourne in the Victorian Football League (VFL).

== Personal life ==
Bell was born at Creswick, Victoria on 23 May 1923. He married Nina Helen Dora Thomson in 1948.

Bell served overseas as a gunner in the Australian Army during the Second World War.
