= Central Highlands Football League =

Australian rules football league in Ballarat, Victoria

Central Highlands Football Netball League
- Current season, competition or edition: 2026
- Formerly: Bacchus Marsh & Ballarat DFL & Clunes FL
- Sport: Australian rules football, Netball
- Founded: 1979; 47 years ago
- Founder: VCFL
- First season: 1979
- President: Heath Boyd
- No. of teams: 17
- Country: Australia
- Venues: Grand Final Venue: Eureka Stadium, Ballarat
- Sponsor: Brandt
- Website: Central Highlands FNL website

The Central Highlands Football League is an Australian Rules Football & Netball League in the Ballarat region. The league coordinates Senior, Reserve, Under 18, Under 15 and Under 12 grades.

== History ==
Central Highlands FNL - 1979 to 2026

The CHFNL was formed in 1979 as a merger of the Clunes FL and the Bacchus Marsh Ballarat DFL.

In 2011 the league admitted four new clubs from the defunct Lexton Plains Football League, bringing the total number of clubs to 18.

In 2014 Illabarook changed its name to Smythesdale to reflect the town it plays its home games. Smythesdale later entered recess in 2018.

Clunes Football Association - 1931 to 1978

The Clunes FA was formed in 1931 and was initially made up of the following teams - Campbelltown, Clunes, Newstead and Smeaton.

== Clubs ==
=== Current clubs ===
Club	Colours	Nickname	Home Ground	Former League	Est.	Years in CHFL	CHFL Senior Premierships	
Club	Colours	Nickname	Home Ground	Former League	Est.	Years in CHFL	Total	Years
Ballan		Blues	Ballan Recreation Reserve, Ballan	B&BMDFL	1881	1979-	2	1980, 1981
Beaufort		Crows	Goldfields Recreation Reserve, Beaufort	BFL	1880	1994-	3	1995, 1996, 2018
Bungaree		Demons	Bungaree Recreation Reserve, Bungaree	CDFL	1897	1979-	2	1991, 2014
Buninyong		Bombers	Buninyong Recreation Reserve, Buninyong	B&BMDFL	1874	1979-	1	2002
Carngham Linton		Saints	Carngham Recreation Reserve, Snake Valley	LPFL	1969	2011-	0	–
Clunes		Magpies	Ligar Street Reserve, Clunes	CDFL	1869	1979-	3	1979, 1993, 1997
Creswick		Wickers	Doug Lindsay Reserve, Creswick	CDFL	1869	1979-	1	1987
Daylesford		Bulldogs	Victoria Park, Daylesford	BFL	1877	2006-	5	2007, 2009, 2012, 2024, 2026
Dunnstown		Towners	Dunnstown Recreation Reserve, Dunnstown	B&BMDFL	1894	1979-	3	1994, 1998, 1999
Gordon		Eagles	Gordon Recreation Reserve, Gordon	B&BMDFL	1895	1979-	3	1988, 2022, 2023
Hepburn		Burras	Hepburn Recreation Reserve, Hepburn	CDFL	1919	1979-	9	1985, 1986, 1989, 2004, 2005, 2008, 2010, 2013, 2017
Learmonth		Lakies	Learmonth Recreation Reserve, Learmonth	CDFL	1889	1979-	0	–
Newlyn		Cats	Newlyn Recreation Reserve, Newlyn	CDFL	1900	1979-	2	1992, 2003
Rokewood Corindhap		Grasshoppers	Rokewood Recreation Reserve, Rokewood	LPFL	1932	2011-	0	–
Skipton		Emus	Skipton Recreation Reserve, Skipton	LPFL	1873	2011-	1	2025
Springbank		Tigers	Wallace Recreation Reserve, Wallace	CDFL	1925	1979-	5	1990, 2000, 2001, 2015, 2016
Waubra		Roos	Waubra Recreation Reserve, Waubra	CDFL	1910	1979-	4	1982, 2006, 2011, 2019

=== Former clubs ===
Club	Colours	Nickname	Home Ground	Former League	Est.	Years in CHFL	CHFL Senior Premierships		Fate
Club	Colours	Nickname	Home Ground	Former League	Est.	Years in CHFL	Total	Years	Fate
Darley		Magpies	Darley Park, Darley	B&BMDFL	1919	1979–1985	1	1984	Moved to Riddell District FNL following 1985 season
Korweinguboora		Bulldogs	Korweinguboora Recreation Reserve, Spargo Creek	CDFL	1920s	1979–1981	0	–	Folded in 1982
Smythesdale (Illabarook 2011-13)	(2011-12)(2013-18)	Bulldogs	Smythesdale Recreation Reserve, Smythesdale	LPFL	1925	2011-2018	0	–	Entered recess following 2018 season
Wendouree		Swans	C.E. Brown Reserve, Wendouree	CDFL	1920s	1979–1994	1	1983	Merged with Ballarat YCW to form Lake Wendouree in Ballarat FL following 1994 season

== Football Premierships ==
=== Senior Football ===
- 1979 Clunes d Ballan
- 1980 Ballan d Dunnstown
- 1981 Ballan d Springbank
- 1982 Waubra d Dunnstown
- 1983 Wendouree d Dunnstown
- 1984 Darley
- 1985 Hepburn d Bungaree
- 1986 Hepburn d Bungaree
- 1987 Creswick
- 1988 Gordon d Bungaree
- 1989 Hepburn d Springbank
- 1990 Springbank
- 1991 Bungaree
- 1992 Newlyn
- 1993 Clunes
- 1994 Dunnstown
- 1995 Beaufort
- 1996 Beaufort
- 1997 Clunes
- 1998 Dunnstown
- 1999 Dunnstown
- 2000 Springbank
- 2001 Springbank
- 2002 Buninyong
- 2003 Newlyn
- 2004 Hepburn
- 2005 Hepburn
- 2006 Waubra
- 2007 Daylesford
- 2008 Hepburn
- 2009 Daylesford d Hepburn
- 2010 Hepburn d Daylesford
- 2011 Waubra d Daylesford
- 2012 Daylesford d Buninyong
- 2013 Hepburn d Buninyong
- 2014 Bungaree d Springbank
- 2015 Springbank d Gordon
- 2016 Springbank d Buninyong
- 2017 Hepburn d Beaufort
- 2018 Beaufort d Buninyong
- 2019 Waubra d Hepburn
- 2020 League in recess due to COVID-19
- 2021 No finals > COVID-19 1st: Gordon
- 2022 Gordon d Springbank
- 2023 Gordon d Springbank
- 2024 Daylesford d Bungaree
- 2025 Skipton d Daylesford
- 2026 Daylesford d Dunnstown

=== Reserves Football ===
- 1979 Bungaree d Wendouree
- 1980 Bungaree d Wendouree
- 1981 Creswick d Learmont
- 1982 Learmonth
- 1983 Wendouree d Gordon
- 1984 Wendouree
- 1985 Darley d Hepburn
- 1986 Creswick
- 1987 Creswick
- 1988 Creswick d Gordon
- 1989 Wendouree d Newlyn
- 1990 Gordon
- 1991 Learmonth
- 1992 Springbank
- 1993 Springbank
- 1994 Wendouree
- 1995 Ballan
- 1996 Dunnstown
- 1997 Buninyong
- 1998 Clunes
- 1999 Buninyong
- 2000 Dunnstown
- 2001 Buninyong
- 2002 Buninyong
- 2003 Buninyong
- 2004 Hepburn
- 2005 Buninyong
- 2006 Hepburn
- 2007 Waubra
- 2008 Hepburn
- 2009 Buninyong d Bungaree
- 2010 Buninyong d Hepburn
- 2011 Waubra d Springbank
- 2012 Buninyong d Waubra
- 2013 Waubra d Bungaree
- 2014 Hepburn d Waubra
- 2015 Beaufort d Buninyong
- 2016 Springbank d Buninyong
- 2017 Buninyong d Beaufort
- 2018 Buninyong d Beaufort
- 2019 Creswick d Springbank
- 2020 League in recess due to COVID-19
- 2021 No finals > COVID-19 1st: Newlyn
- 2022 Springbank d Skipton
- 2023 Springbank d Newlyn
- 2024 Bungaree d Buninyong
- 2025 Dunnstown d Buninyong
- 2026 Learmonth d Buninyong

=== Under 17s/18s ===
- 1979 Creswick
- 1980 Newlyn
- 1981 Hepburn d Ballan
- 1982 Ballan
- 1983 Darley
- 1984 Buninyong
- 1985 Dunnstown d Darley
- 1986 Dunnstown
- 1987 Buninyong
- 1988 Ballan d Hepburn
- 1989 Bungaree d Ballan
- 1990 Creswick
- 1991 Dunnstown
- 1992 Ballan
- 1993 Learmonth
- 1994 Buninyong
- 1995 Creswick
- 1996 Ballan
- 1997 Bungaree
- 1998 Bungaree
- 1999 Bungaree
- 2000 Gordon
- 2001 Beaufort
- 2002 Gordon
- 2003 Dunnstown
- 2004 Buninyong
- 2005 Bungaree
- 2006 Bungaree
- 2007 Bungaree
- 2008 Bungaree
- Under 18
- 2009 Daylesford d Ballan
- 2010 Waubra d Daylesford
- 2011 Waubra d Learmonth
- 2012 Springbank d Daylesford
- Under 17.5
- 2013 Daylesford d Buninyong
- 2014 Hepburn d Bungaree
- Under 18
- 2015 Bungaree d Hepburn
- 2016 Beaufort d Waubra
- 2017 Hepburn d Springbank
- 2018 Springbank d Buninyong
- 2019 Gordon d Buninyong
- 2020 League in recess due to COVID-19
- 2021 No finals > COVID-19 1st: Rokewood Corindhap
- 2022 Springbank d Gordon
- 2023 Springbank d Rokewood Corindhap
- 2024 Springbank d Daylesford
- 2025 Learmonth d Rokewood Corindhap
- 2026 Skipton d Bungaree

=== Under 14s/15s ===
- 1979 Clunes
- 1980 Hepburn
- 1981 Buninyong
- 1982 Buninyong
- 1983 Buninyong
- 1984 Dunnstown
- 1985 Creswick d Ballan
- 1986 Creswick
- 1987 Newlyn
- 1988 Bungaree d Ballan
- 1989 Gordon
- 1990 Ballan
- 1991 Buninyong
- 1992 Creswick
- 1993 Creswick
- 1994 Ballan
- 1995 Creswick
- 1996 Learmonth
- 1997 Gordon
- 1998 Beaufort
- 1999 Gordon
- 2000 Learmonth
- 2001 Learmonth
- 2002 Buninyong
- 2003 Creswick
- 2004 Hepburn
- 2005 Bungaree
- 2006 Hepburn
- 2007 Dunnstown
- 2008 Creswick
- Under 15
- 2009 Learmonth d Dunnstown
- 2010 Daylesford d Clunes
- 2011 Creswick d Gordon
- 2012 Beaufort d Dunnstown
- Under 14.5
- 2013 Buninyong d Hepburn
- 2014 Hepburn d Buninyong
- Under 15
- 2015 Creswick d Hepburn
- 2016 Buninyong d Hepburn
- 2017 Springbank d Hepburn
- 2018 Skipton d Gordon
- 2019 Gordon d Springbank
- 2020 League in recess due to COVID-19
- 2021 No finals > COVID-19 1st: Buninyong
- 2022 Buninyong d Daylesford
- 2023 Rokewood Corindhap d Springbank
- 2024 Skipton d Ballan
- 2025 Skipton d Learmonth
- 2026 Skipton d Waubra

== Statistics ==
CHFNL: Senior Football Records
Highest Score	436 – Gordon 69.22.436 (Smythesdale 1.1.7) – 2015
Most goals in a game	22 – Paul McMahon – Springbank vs Smythesdale round 17 2016
Most goals in a season	149 – Ian McBain – Dunnstown – 1982
Most wins in a row	32 – Dunnstown – 1994–1995
Most losses in a row	83 – Smythesdale (Illabarook) – 2011–2015
2023 CHFL season
Football Premiers: Seniors: Gordon; Reserves: Under 18s: Under 15s:	Football Minor Premiers: Seniors: Reserves: Under 18s: Under 15s:
Football Goalkicking Awards: Seniors: Reserves: Under 18s: Under 15s:	Football Best & Fairest: Seniors: Sean Tighe; Reserves: Under 18s: Under 15s:

== League Best & Fairest ==
Senior Football

	CHFNL - Best & Fairest		
Geoff Taylor Medal
Year	Winner	Club	Votes
1979	Ian Lyttle	Clunes	24
1980	Hans Veerdorm	Buninyong	23
1981	Peter Muller	Creswick	20
1982	Peter Keep	Darley	38
1983	Terry Howard	Newlyn	32
1984	Peter Keep	Darley	27
1985	Tony Howlett	Bungaree	20
1986	David Jenkins	Creswick	26
1987	Peter Gervasoni	Hepburn	24
1988	Mark Milne &	Gordon	24
	Leigh Mitchell	Newlyn	24
1989	Andy Dispirit	Ballan	22
1990	Mark Milne	Gordon	24
1991	Stuart Richardson	Newlyn	22
1992	Chris Parker	Waubra	25
1993	David Wood	Learmonth	22
1994	Peter Doherty	Beaufort	29
1995	Peter Doherty	Beaufort	32
1996	Peter Doherty	Beaufort	23
1997	Matthew Brown	Hepburn	29
1998	Ricky Andrews &	Beaufort	23
	Lynden Henderson	Buninong	23
1999	Peter Doherty	Beaufort	28
2000	James Hall	Springbank	22
2001	Scott Crouch	Bungaree	28
2002	Simon Wilkie	Ballan	22
2003	Barry Fitzpatrick	Beaufort	24
2004	Jason Hill	Clunes	25
2005	Joe Gilbert	Buninyong	23
2006	Luke Adams	Daylesford	29
2007	Luke Adams	Daylesford	29
2008	Louis Frank	Beaufort	24
2009	Jaye Cahir	Dunnstown	24
2010	Chris Eastwell	Newlyn	22
2011	Louis Frank	Beaufort	23
2012	Andy McKay	Hepburn	25
2013	Nick Sullivan	Waubra	27
2014	Luke Fisher	Springbank	29
2015	Shaun Campbell	Ballan	34
2016	David Benson	Bungaree	21
2017	David Benson	Bungaree	28
2018	Joel Maher	Bungaree	28
2019	Rupert Sangster	Beaufort	22
2020	CHFNL in recess >	COVID-19	
2021	Mitchell Gilbert	Skipton	17
2022	Sam Willian	Skipton	30
2023	Sean Tighe	Hepburn	23
2024	Will Henderson	Dunnstown	19
2025	Flynn Stevenson	Dunnstown	23
2026	Matthew Aikman	Rokewood Corindhap	23

== Leading CHFL Goalkicker ==
Seniors

	CHFNL - Senior Football Leading & Century Goalkickers				
Year	Winner	Club	Season Goals	Goals in finals	Total Goals
1979	Ian McBain	Dunnstown	104		
1980	Geoff Bourke - Finn	Ballan	98		
1981	Ian McBain	Dunnstown	97		
1982	Ian McBain	Dunnstown	122		
1983	Ian McBain	Dunnstown	73		
1984	Michael Hastie	Ballan	96		
1985	Tony Howlett	Bungaree	95		
1986	Peter Nikolovski	Hepburn	96		
1987	Darren Lubeek	Creswick	105		
1988	Ian Denny	Gordon	71		
1989	John Heagney	Newlyn	59		
1990	Justin Conroy	Ballan	69		
1991	Malcom Scott	Learmonth	89		
1992	Jason Yean	Creswick	91		
1993	Ian Denny	Gordon	114		
1994	Ian Denny	Gordon	121		
1995	Steven Gallop	Ballan	106		
1996	Troy Jansenns	Dunnstown	74		
1997	Ricky Inness	Buninyong	61		
1998	Paul Mahar	Bungaree	76		
1999	Dave Thompson	Hepburn	72		
2000	Sam Basham	Learmonth	79		
2001	Phillip Jeffrey	Bungaree	72		
2002	Greg Barass	Hepburn	80		
2003	Greg Barass	Hepburn	100		
2004	Owen Weatherley	Clunes	102		
2005	Owen Weatherley	Clunes	114		
2006	Lee Brown	Waubra	104		
2007	Bryce Nicholson	Bungaree	95		
2008	Lee Brown	Waubra	100		
2009	Rodney Watts	Ballan	88	N/A	88
2010	Lee Cox	Hepburn	118	?	?
2011	Lee Cox	Hepburn	79		
2012	Lee Cox	Hepburn	106		
2013	Lee Cox	Hepburn	62		
2014	Zach Peoples	Ballan	83		
2015	Steven Nicholson	Gordon	66		
2016	Paul McMahon	Springbank	79	10	89
2017	Tim Boyle	Waubra	53	1	54
2018	Isaac Baker &	Buninyong	41	6	47
	Jack Duke	Beaufort	41	8	49
2019	Marcus Darmody	Newlyn	103		?
	Sam Dunstan	Hepburn	?		108
2020	CHFNL in recess >	COVID-19			
2021	Sam Dunstan	Hepburn	82		
2022	Mitchell Banner	Hepburn	73		
2023	Andrew McKay	Hepburn	70	2	72
2024	James Lukich	Bungaree	60	12	72
2025	Adam Toohey	Gordan	58	6	64
2026	Marcus Darmody	Newlyn	67		
Year	Winner	Club	Season Goals	Goals in finals	Total Goals

== Bibliography ==
- History of Football in the Ballarat District by John Stoward - ISBN 978-0-9805929-0-0
