= Graham Wise =

Australian rules footballer

Personal information
- Born: 13 October 1942 (age 84)
- Original teams: Skipton, North Ballarat, (BFL)
- Height: 188 cm (6 ft 2 in)
- Weight: 83 kg (183 lb)

Playing career^{1}
Years	Club	Games (Goals)
1963–1966	Melbourne	40 (1)
- ^{1} Playing statistics correct to the end of 1966.

Graham Wise (born 13 October 1942) is a former Australian rules footballer who played with Melbourne in the Victorian Football League (VFL) during the 1960s.

Wise was a ruckman and joined Melbourne for the 1963 season. He played in Melbourne's 1964 VFL premiership side and finished his career with 40 senior games.

During the 1970s he played with and coached Golden Point in the Ballarat Football League.
