= Learmonth, Victoria =

Learmonth
- Town
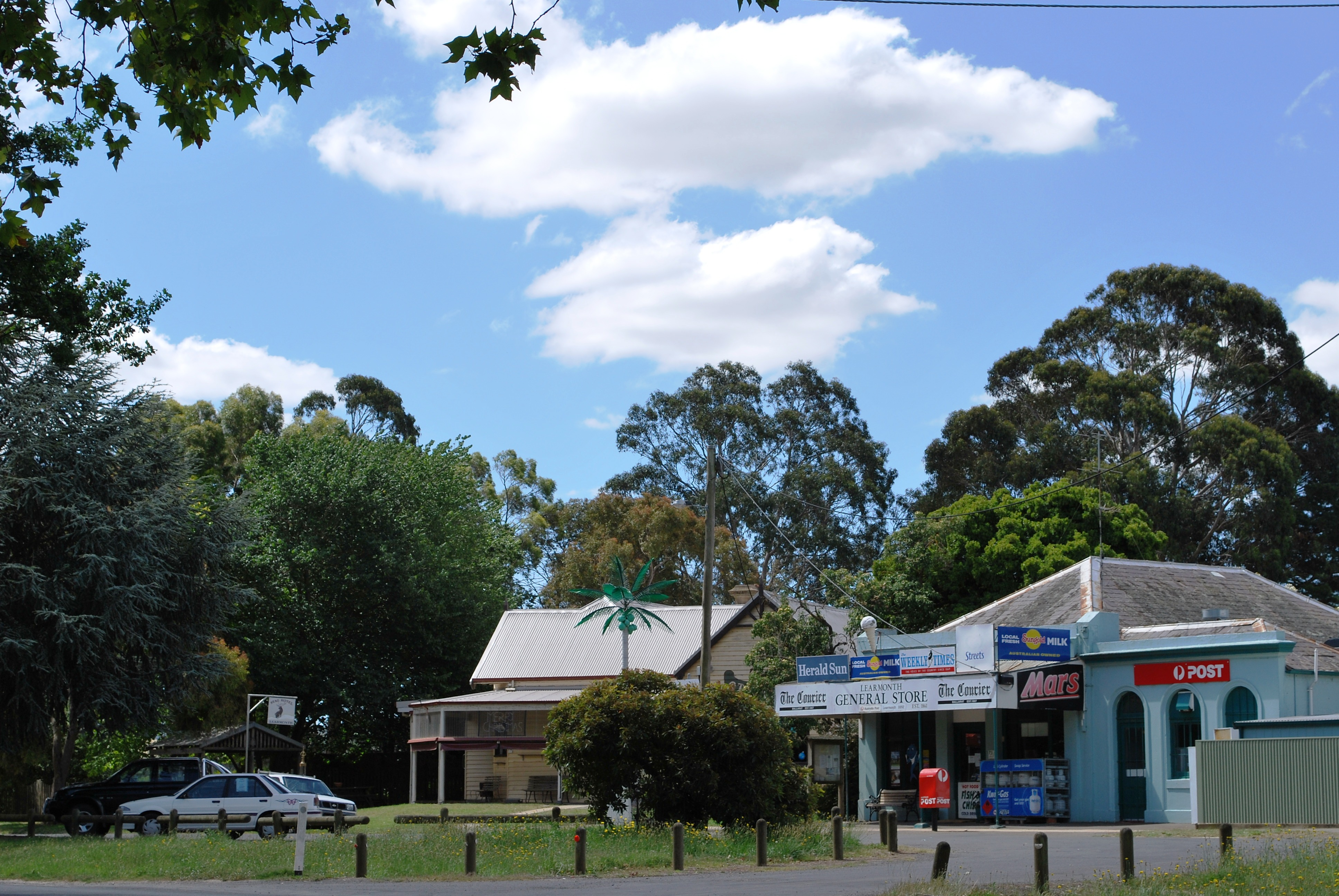
- Hotel and general store

- Coordinates: 37°25′S 143°43′E
- Country: Australia
- State: Victoria
- LGA: City of Ballarat
- Location: 136 km (85 mi) W of Melbourne; 23 km (14 mi) NW of Ballarat; 9 km (5.6 mi) SE of Waubra

Government
  - State electorate: Ripon
  - Federal division: Ballarat

Population
  - Total: 396 (2021 census)
- Postcode: 3352

Learmonth is a town, located in Central Victoria, Australia, 136 kilometres (85 mi) west of the state capital Melbourne, and 23 kilometres north west of the regional city centre of Ballarat. Learmonth is located on the Sunraysia Highway, on the road to Avoca, St Arnaud and the Pyrenees wine region, and is surrounded by an agricultural, pastoral and dairy region. At the 2021 census, Learmonth had a population of 396.

== History ==
The township was first established in 1837. It was the original local government office headquarters of the Shire of Ballarat. Lake Learmonth Post Office opened on 13 February 1858 and was renamed Learmonth in 1860.

The town was named in reference to its position beside Lake Learmonth, which itself was named after the brothers Thomas Livingston Learmonth and Somerville Learmonth who squatted in the area in 1838.

In November 1859, Thomas Learmonth made a donation towards building a church in the town:

Thomas Learmonth, Esq., of Ercildoun, with his usual liberality has contributed £20 towards the erection of a Church of England place of worship at Lake Learmonth.

One Learmonth brother in particular, was implicitly aware his shepherds were using skulls of Wadawurrung people on stakes to ward people off his property.

== Today ==
The town has a large lake, Lake Learmonth, which is popular for water sports, fishing and family activities. This lake has always been a natural water hole and swamp, but was enhanced by human intervention in the late 1800s, resulting in a fuller and more defined lake area. Picnic areas, children's playgrounds and nature walks exist on the eastern and northern side of the lake. Gently rolling ancient volcanic hills surround the town, and the soil is rich and red; good for growing plants and trees. The natural birdlife in the area is well appreciated by locals.

Learmonth today has a post office, pub, cafe, antique store, two churches (the Learmonth Uniting Church closed in 2025), shire hall, historic society, police station, art hall, community garden, lawn bowling club, aged care facility and a friendly and active community life. There is a free community newsletter named 'The Learmonth Thunderer', run by volunteers. There is also an Australian Rules football team competing in the Central Highlands Football League. A historic walking tour runs up and down the main street (High Street) highlighting many interesting former businesses of the early settler and colonial period.

== Population ==
In the 2016 Census, there were 438 people in Learmonth. 87.9% of people were born in Australia and 93.0% of people spoke only English at home. The most common responses for religion were No Religion 30.9% and Catholic 28.2%.
