= Hepburn Springs =

- Town
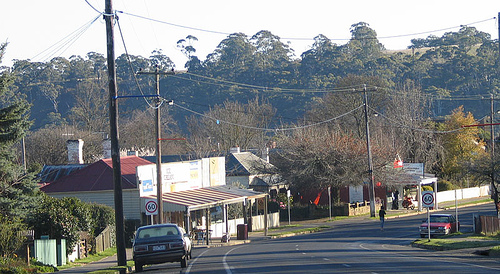
- Main Road

- Coordinates: 37°19′0″S 144°08′0″E
- Country: Australia
- State: Victoria
- LGA: Shire of Hepburn
- Location: 114 km (71 mi) NW of Melbourne; 48 km (30 mi) NE of Ballarat; 3 km (1.9 mi) N of Daylesford

Government
  - State electorate: Macedon
  - Federal division: Ballarat

Population
  - Total: 368 (2021 census)
- Postcode: 3461

Hepburn Springs is a resort town located in the middle of the largest concentration of mineral springs in Australia, situated in Victoria, 48 km northeast of Ballarat. The 2021 census recorded a population of 368 in Hepburn Springs. The town is named after Captain John Hepburn, who was an early squatter in central Victoria. The traditional owners of the land are the Dja Dja Wurrung.

Hepburn and Hepburn Springs are twin towns that are often grouped together under the Hepburn Springs name. Hepburn Springs was originally known as "Spring Creek" and Hepburn as "Old Racecourse". Old Racecourse is the location of the recreation reserve, and "New Racecourse" is otherwise known as Victoria Park in nearby Daylesford. Both Hepburn and Hepburn Springs were located on the Jim Crow Diggings, and the towns were populated by miners in the 1850s, predominantly from England, Ireland, Germany, Switzerland, Italy, and France. The Hepburn Post Office opened on 1 January 1854 and closed in 1964. Later, the Hepburn Springs Post Office opened on 1 October 1908.

Today, the village is known as a spa town. Visitors can sample the local mineral waters and explore other local amenities.

Hepburn Springs' buildings are dominated by Edwardian architecture, unlike the Victorian architecture present in nearby Daylesford. This is due to the devastation of the 1906 bushfire, which destroyed most buildings in the settlement.

Hepburn Springs is located in the Wombat State Forest between the former volcanoes of Mt. Franklin and Wombat Hill. The prevalence of mineral water in the area is related to the distance from the Great Dividing Range and the volcanic nature of the geology.

== Mineral Springs ==
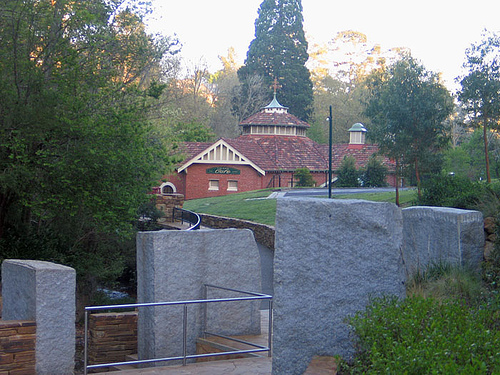
Hepburn Mineral Spring—Locarno and the pavilion

In 1864, its citizens met at the Savoia Hotel and petitioned the government to protect the mineral springs from mining; the water was rated as more valuable than gold, and the Hepburn Mineral Spring Reserve was created in 1865. Many of its residents came from 'spa' areas in Italy, Germany, and England and appreciated its value. A bathhouse was created in the 1890s and has been remodelled several times. The latest remodelling opened in 2008. Several springs exist in the main reserve: Soda, Sulphur, Pavilion, Locarno and Wyuna. Golden Spring, Hendersons and Lithia Spring are located in the vicinity.

== Swiss and Italian Influence ==
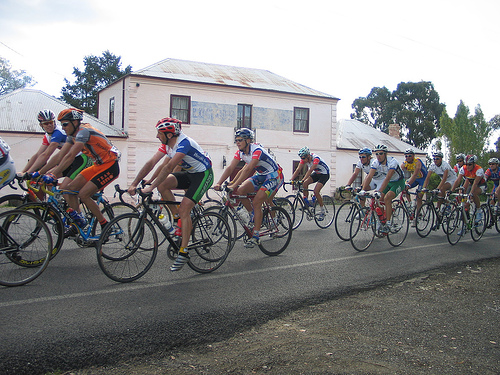
Pasta has been made in Hepburn Springs since 1865

The influence of the Swiss Italians of Australia—Italian-speaking Swiss from the cantons of Ticino and Grisons and the northern Italians—is still present in the township through the names of its residents, the names of its springs (Locarno) and buildings (Savoia Hotel, Parma House, Perinis, Bellinzona), and the annual Swiss-Italian Festa.

The centre of the Italian-speaking community was the area around the Savoia (Spring Creek) Hotel and the Macaroni Factory. The Savoia is named after the royal family of unified Italy. An Italian reading library was located at the hotel, and pasta was made opposite in Lucini's Macaroni Factory which was also home to the Democratic Club. Lucini's moved from Lonsdale Street, Melbourne in 1865, where they had set up the first pasta factory in Australia in 1864. Vanzetta's bakery supplied bread and Crippa, Perini and the Gervasonis (Yandoit Creek) produced wine.

Renowned landscape artist Victor Zelman lived at Zelman Cottage in Hepburn Springs. It contains a frieze in the main living area of the 360-degree ridgeline view from the cottage.

A local delicacy is bullboar, which is a sausage made from beef, pork, garlic and spices. In 2005, Daylesford Secondary College participated in ABC's Young Gourmets by making bullboars from the Gervasoni and Sartori recipes. It gained media attention over the fate of the pig used. The Bullboar has been named an endangered recipe by the Slow Food Movement.

A book on the Swiss Italians in the region by Clare Gervasoni, entitled Bullboar Macaroni and Mineral Water, details the influence of the Swiss Italians on Hepburn Springs.

In 2007, the Melbourne Immigration Museum featured a display entitled Wine Water and Stone, reflecting the Swiss and Italian heritage of the area.

== Heritage-listed sites ==
Hepburn Springs has seven sites on the Victorian Heritage Register: Hepburn Mineral Springs Reserve, including the bathhouse and the pavilion; Hepburn Pool, which was named Victoria's Favourite Built Place in 2004; Parma House; Blowhole Gold Diversion Tunnel, where Chinese miners diverted the Jim Crow Creek; Former Macaroni Factory, which is still owned by the descendants of the Lucini family; Jim Crow Creek Gold Mining Diversion Sluice; and Breakneck Gorge Puddling Site, which is located near the Blowhole.

The Hepburn Planning Scheme also lists a number of sites of local heritage significance, including the Savoia Hotel, Wyuna, Mooltan, the Grande, the Palais, Dudley House, Mineral Springs Hotel and the Breakneck Gorge culvert.

== Entertainment ==
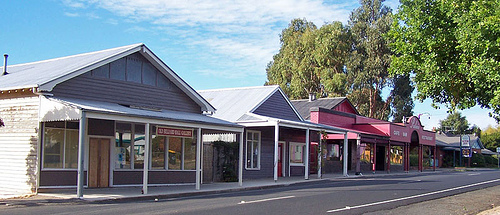
Hepburn Springs Palais—musical centre of the town

The Palais is a well-known and popular bar and music venue which regularly attracts national and international acts including Paul Kelly, Mark Seymour and Lloyd Cole. The Palais was a popular dance venue in the 1920s–1950s and has a sprung wooden floor which is good for dancing.

The Laurie Sullivan Reserve is a popular place for walking amongst the trees planted by Laurie Sullivan, many of which are now memorials to local stalwarts who were instrumental in the development and management of the reserve.

The area is well known for its health, well-being and food. Several day spas utilising mineral water are located in the township as well a wide range of restaurants, cafe, hotels, guest houses and accommodation options.

The town is surrounded by the Hepburn Regional Park where it is possible to conduct short or long bushwalks, along old gold mining water sluices and peppered by mineral springs.

Playgrounds are found at the Hepburn Mineral Spring Reserve and at the Laurie Sullivan Recreation Reserve. Barbecue facilities are located at the Hepburn Mineral Spring Reserve and the Hepburn Pool.

== Sport ==
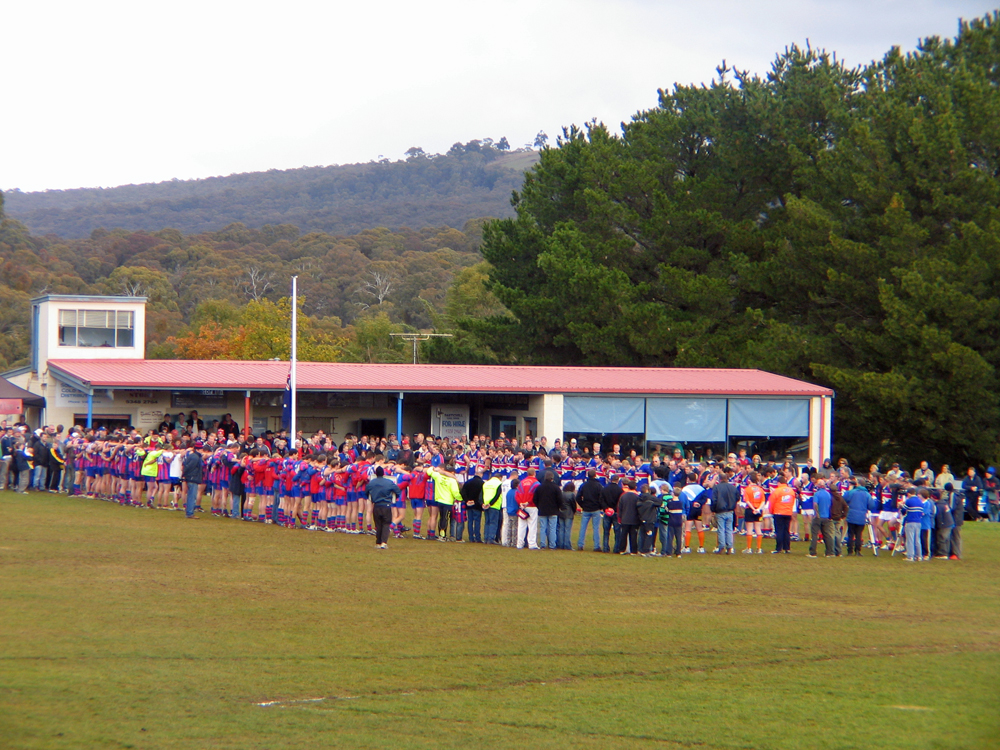
Hepburn Football Club members in the Laurie Sullivan Recreation Reserve

The local Australian Rules Football team is the Hepburn Football Club (nicknamed the Burras) who play at the Laurie Sullivan Recreation Reserve in 20th Street, competing in the Central Highlands Football League. In summer, the Hepburn Cricket team also play at the reserve. Hepburn football and cricket clubs were successful clubs in the early twenty-first century.

Golfers play at the course of the Hepburn Springs Golf Club on Golf Links Road.

== Notable people ==
- Lisa Gervasoni – Artist and planner
- Robert Walls – AFL coach and player
- Victor Zelman – Artist
- Richard Pleasance – Musician

== Notes ==
Notes

- Daylesford Advocate, Mercury, Express, Mercury-Express. 1859-1870 Data extracted and interpreted by Les Pitt-Daylesford

== Bibliography ==
- Clare Gervasoni, Bullboar Macaroni and Mineral Water: Spa Country's Swiss & Italian Story 2005
