= Greg Dowd =

Australian rules footballer

Personal information
- Full name: Greg Dowd
- Born: 19 March 1946
- Died: 27 July 2002 (aged 56)
- Original team: East Ballarat
- Height: 180 cm (5 ft 11 in)
- Weight: 73 kg (161 lb)

Playing career^{1}
Years	Club	Games (Goals)
1966	Footscray	1 (0)
- ^{1} Playing statistics correct to the end of 1966.

Greg Dowd (19 March 1946 – 27 July 2002) was a former Australian rules footballer who played with Footscray in the Victorian Football League (VFL).
