= Newlyn, Victoria =

Newlyn Victoria
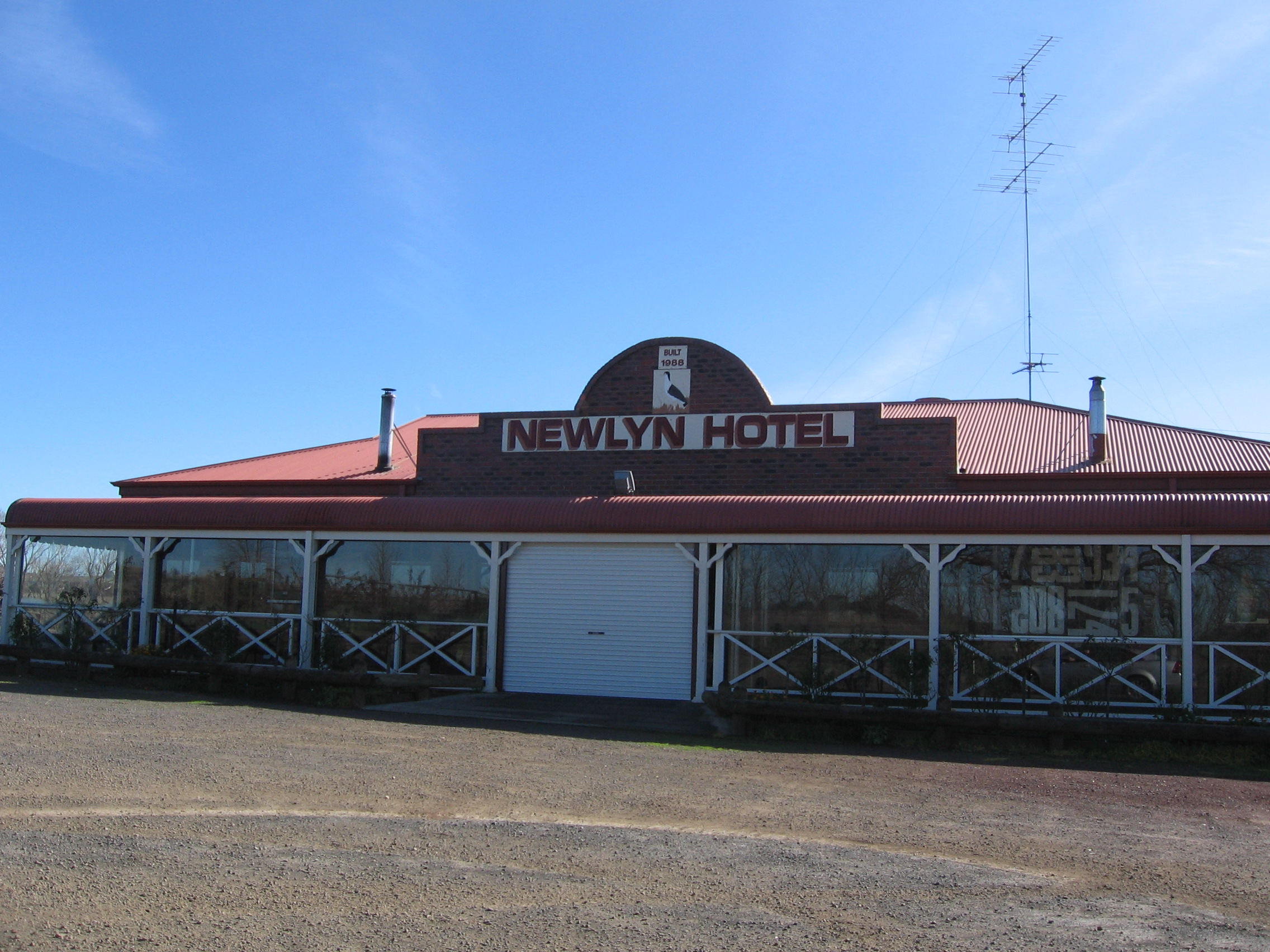
- Newlyn Hotel

- Coordinates: 37°25′01″S 143°58′59″E
- Population: 136 (2021 census)
- Postcode(s): 3364
- Elevation: 452 m (1,483 ft)
- Location: 124 km (77 mi) NW of Melbourne; 27 km (17 mi) NE of Ballarat; 19 km (12 mi) SW of Daylesford; 10 km (6 mi) E of Creswick
- LGA(s): Shire of Hepburn
- State electorate(s): Ripon
- Federal division(s): Ballarat

Newlyn is a town in the Shire of Hepburn, in Victoria, Australia. It is situated on the Midland Highway between Creswick and Daylesford. At the 2021 census, Newlyn had a population of 136.

The area was first settled in by Creswick miners who turned to farming as alluvial gold became harder to obtain. In 1915, the township split into Newlyn and Newlyn North after a naming dispute between its two post offices. The Newlyn Recreation Reserve serves as a venue for meetings and sporting clubs, including the local Newlyn Football Netball Club and the Coronet City-Newlyn Cricket Club, while the town also has a small state primary school.

== Name ==
According to Placenames Victoria, Newlyn is considered to be named after the Cornish village of St Newlyn East by the descendants of Cornish families who settled in the town during the Victorian gold rush. Houses in Newlyn were also given the names of other settlements in the English county. The town may also be named after another town in Cornwall named Newlyn.

== History ==
In the mid-1850s, alluvial gold was now harder to find because of the Victorian gold rush. Miners from nearby Creswick—many of whom were of the Methodist church—settled in the Newlyn area after finding it was suitable for farming.

Two post offices were opened in the following years. One was named the Bella Vue Post Office before it moved to the railway station and renamed the Newlyn Railway Station Post Office. When this post office was relocated to J. Walton's store in 1915, sixty residents signed a petition to rename it the Newlyn Post Office. The other post office in the north, conducted by J. Williams, had operated as the Newlyn Post Office ever since it had opened 46 years prior. Although 118 people signed a counter-petition to retain the name of Williams' post office, the Postmaster-General renamed it Newlyn North, much to the anger of the northern residents.

Newlyn Station was on a branch line of the Mildura railway line from North Creswick to Daylesford which closed in 1953.

== Buildings ==
Newlyn has a general store, a hotel, a hall and a primary school. The Post Office opened on 10 September 1864. A mechanics' institute was opened in 1886, which became the site of the Newlyn Antiques and Nursery. In 1890, Newlyn had two hotels, two churches, a free library (which would also become part of the Nursery) and a large produce store.

=== Newlyn Antiques and Cottage Garden Nursery ===
Newlyn Antiques and Cottage Garden Nursery was owned by John and Faye Hungerford, who worked there for twenty-three years after buying the building in 1996. The site is composed of a number of historical buildings, including a cottage built in 1853, and a restorer’s shed and hall established in 1886, which housed the Mechanics' Institute and Free Library. The couple retired in 2019 and Faye died in May 2022.

== Recreation ==
The Newlyn Recreation Reserve is located on the Midland Highway outside Newlyn. While the land was initially donated by a farming family in the 1950s, the current building was completed in 1991. It serves as a venue for community meetings and sports clubs, as it contains the oval and netball courts.

== Education ==
Newlyn Primary School was established in 1858 as a Wesleyan school. It became a state school (no. 453) in 1861 and a common school in 1862, and took its current name in 1970. The 1887 brick building has been retained, and the school also has a garden with several animals and a 1930s piano. It has faced closure from declining enrolment and funding and is maintained by community volunteers. Samantha Vella has acted as the school principal since 2018 and is one of two teachers. As of 2021, Newlyn Primary School has eighteen students, an increase from six in 2018. The school received local coverage in October 2022 when the school bell, built in the late 1880s, which students would ring at the end of every break, was stolen.

== Sport ==
The Newlyn Football Netball Club plays in the Central Highlands Football League.

The Coronet City-Newlyn Cricket Club is the town's cricket club. During the 1950s and 60s, the area was in the Newlyn Cricket Association, but faced demise as sides joined other associations and cricket became more popular in Ballarat. They won a premiership in the 90s but were in recess for two years. Its president is Craig Slater, who has been involved in the club for around forty-five years, and its captain is Ben Dimond. The Newlyn Cricket Club used to play in the Daylesford Cricket Association before it folded. It survived by becoming part of the Coronet City Cricket Club and joining the Ballarat Cricket Association in 2012.

== Sources ==
- Lynes, E.T. (1987). A history of Newlyn. Ballarat, Victoria: Loftset Press. ISBN 1862529132.
- Tropman, Lester; Jacobs, Wendy; McConville, Chris; Aitken, Richard (December 1990). Creswick Shire Heritage Study (PDF). Creswick Shire, Victoria: Prepared for the National Estate Committee (Victoria) and Shire of Creswick.
