= Lisa Gervasoni =

Australian artist (born 1969)

- Born: 1969 (age 56–57); Melbourne, Australia
- Education: Royal Melbourne Institute of Technology; University of Melbourne
- Occupations: Strategic planner, photographer, artist
- Parent: Jack Gervasoni (father)

Lisa Gervasoni (born 1969) is the Senior Stakeholder Policy and Advocacy Advisor at the Victorian Farmers Federation. Gervasoni is strategic planner, photographer and artist. She was born in Melbourne, Australia. Gervasoni is part of a long family tradition of working with heritage sites in Australia. She is a member of the International Council on Monuments and Sites (ICOMOS) and was a two-term member of their executive committee. She has been a keynote speaker in Victoria, Australia. Gervasoni was instrumental in getting Hepburn Pool listed on the Victorian Heritage Register.

== Education ==
Gervasoni went to Genazzano FCJ College for her undergraduate studies. She later graduated from the Royal Melbourne Institute of Technology where she received a Bachelor of Applied Science-Planning. She earned her Master of Environmental Studies from the University of Melbourne.

== Career and work ==
Gervasoni became involved in community and heritage work at a young age. Her father, Jack Gervasoni, worked as a councilor at City of Kew. Gervasoni's strategic planning has been referenced in the Planning Institute of Australia's submission to the Parliament of Australia's Standing Committee on Agriculture, Fisheries and Forestry Inquiry into Future Water Supply for Rural Industries and Communities. Gervasoni has given evidence to many parliamentary inquiries and in 2020 she gave evidence to the Royal Commission into Natural Disaster Arrangements. The March 2010 edition of Planning News featured an article on fire risk and planning.

Gervasoni identifies heritage as an important and necessary part of a community's well-being. Other critical components of a healthy community identified by Gervasoni are practicing sustainable growth and celebrating history. Gervasoni has written extensively on heritage matters and was the Municipal Association of Victoria representative on the community reference group for the Historic Places Investigation by VEAC. Gervasoni has presented papers to many planning and heritage conferences as was the keynote speaker at the Victorian Association of Family History Organisation (VAFHO) conference in 2013.

=== Hepburn Pool ===
Gervasoni's work in documenting and promoting pre-olympic swimming pools was critical in saving Hepburn Pool and later, being named as Victoria's Favourite Built Place in 2004. This recognition helped lead to funding from the Minister for Planning in 2006 to ensure the pool's long-term survival. Gervasoni did significant research on pre olympic pools for the Australia ICOMOS Watermarks conference in 2011.

=== Art and photo documentary ===
Gervasoni is dedicated to ensuring the photographic documentation of urban areas, heritage sites and natural resources of Australia. She has provided over 70,000 images to the National Library of Australia Trove database via the Flickr portal.

Gervasoni had a solo exhibition, Reimagining our cultural landscapes, at the Art Gallery of Ballarat in 2023 for the Ballarat Heritage Festival. The exhibition took inspiration from the works of Eugene Von Guerard and used an abstract expressionism to change focal points and look for new patterns and meanings in the landscape.

In 2004 Gervasoni won the Daylesford Small Art Prize for an embroidered depiction of the Savoia Hotel. Her art mediums are photography, embroidery and acrylic on canvas. Many of her works have a theme of interpretation of heritage and cultural spaces. Her art has a page on Bluethumb and the National Register of Art and Artists.

Gervasoni was a finalist in the 2022 Harden Art Prize for Australian Landscape painting and had a solo exhibition at Backspace at the Art Gallery of Ballarat in 2023.

Gervasoni's photographs have been published in Ballarat Views by Dorothy Wickham. She was also published in the Warrnambool Heritage Strategy report in 2011. Gervasoni's image of Broken Hill was used on the cover of the 2009-2010 Australia ICOMOS Annual report. An image of Burra is used on the front cover of the history of Australia ICOMOS, an image of Pootilla on the cover of the Victorian Farmers Federation 2018 Conference proceedings and an image of Stawell Town Hall on the front cover of Long distance commuting and regional development: a case study of Stawell, Victoria. Her photos have been used in news publications such as The Age and the Sydney Herald. Gervasoni designed the cover art for an early numeracy book - Extending Mathematical Understanding (EMU) - consisting of an emu constructed from brightly coloured numbers. In 2007 one of Gervasoni's images was chosen as the Christmas Card for the managing director of the Australian Broadcasting Commission.

In 2010 Gervasoni was asked to be involved in ABC Open's inaugural project One on One: Change. Her involvement in other projects were featured on ABC Open. Her work for ABC Open Now and Then was one of 40 images nationwide displayed at an exhibition in the Museum of Sydney. In 2011 Gervasoni curated an exhibition in the Warrnambool Art Gallery using ABC South West Vic Now and Then photos as well as images illustrating the thematic environmental history for Warrnambool. In 2012 she curated the Makers and Shapers exhibition in the Warrnambool Art Gallery.

Gervasoni has self published three photo books on weather, Warrnambool and Uluru.

=== Awards ===
Gervasoni was inducted into the Hepburn Shire Council's Women's Honour Roll in 2009. Hepburn Shires recognized her various professional and community achievements and highlighted her skills as a town planner. She was the Victorian winner of the Urban Planning Achievement category of the Planning Institute of Australia.

== Quotes ==
- "People often return to a place with family, and are disappointed when it is greatly changed...understanding what people value can assist in planning."
- "Heritage as a concept changes and develops over time."
- "It is a wicked problem that we have been trying to discuss for quite some time. One of the things we called for in the review of native vegetation regulations was a recognition that agriculture is probably one of the few areas that, through Landcare and even Salt Action: Joint Action before that and the farm tree association, has been voluntarily getting to net gain and quite often not with a lot of support."
