= Jim Stephenson (Australian footballer) =

Australian rules footballer (1934–2021)

Personal information
- Full name: James William Stephenson
- Born: 13 August 1934
- Died: 16 July 2021 (aged 86)
- Original team: Ballarat
- Height: 180 cm (5 ft 11 in)
- Weight: 81 kg (179 lb)

Playing career^{1}
Years	Club	Games (Goals)
1956	St Kilda	2 (1)
- ^{1} Playing statistics correct to the end of 1956.

James William Stephenson (13 August 1934 – 16 July 2021) was an Australian rules footballer who played with St Kilda in the Victorian Football League (VFL). Stephenson died on 16 July 2021, at the age of 86.
