= Waubra Football Netball Club =

Waubra FNC

Names
- Full name: Waubra Football Netball Club
- Nickname: Kangaroos

Club details
- Founded: 1903; 123 years ago
- Colours: blue white
- Competition: Central Highlands FL
- Ground: Waubra Oval

Uniforms
Home

Other information
- Official website: waubrafnc.com

The Waubra Football Netball Club Inc, nicknamed Kangaroos, is an Australian rules football and netball club based in the town of Waubra, Victoria. The team currently plays in the Central Highlands Football League.

== History ==
Like all small rural towns, every town had persons wanting to participate in the leisure activity of Australian rules football, with Weabra's first media documented match summary appeared in June 1903 in a match against Federal Coghill's Creek.

Waubra was able to join the nearby Learmonth FA in 1912. They were content to stay in this competition until it dissolved twenty years later. Undaunted the club moved to the replacement competition that was larger in teams and distance in the need to travel. With the dark shadow of war the club moved again this time to the Clunes FA for 1940. This move was because the Burrumbeet DFA had gone into recess.

After World War II, Waubra joined the Ballarat Football League but soon discovered that the standard was too high. Fortunately the Lexton Football League had formed nearby so they transferred in it in 1946. Waubra was the dominant team from the start until 1961. Between 1946 and 1961 the seniors contested 13 out of a possible 16 grand finals, winning 8 of them.

In 1975 Waubra transferred from the Lexton FL to the Clunes Football League. Four years later, the Clunes FL merged with the Ballarat and Bacchus Marsh Football League to form the Central Highlands Football League and Waubra was a founding club.

== Leagues and Premierships ==
- Learmonth District Football Association (1912–1933)
  - 1922, 1923, 1925
- Burrumbeet and District Football Association (1934–1939)
  - 1938, 1939
- Clunes Football Association (1940)
- Ballarat Football League (1945)
- Lexton Football League (1946–1974)
  - 1946, 1947, 1948, 1950, 1955, 1956, 1957, 1960
- Clunes Football League (1975–1978)
- Central Highlands Football League (1979- )
  - 1982, 2006, 2011, 2019

== VFL/AFL players ==
- Norm Duncan - South Melbourne
- Alex McDonald - Hawthorn, Collingwood
- Anthony McDonald - Melbourne
- James McDonald - Melbourne, Greater Western Sydney

== Bibliography ==
- History of Football in the Ballarat District by John Stoward - ISBN 978-0-9805929-0-0
