= Hepburn Mineral Springs Reserve =

Mineral spring reserve in Victoria, Australia

Coordinates: 37°18′42″S 144°8′31″E

The Hepburn Mineral Springs Reserve is a 30-hectare (74-acre) reserve near Hepburn Springs, Victoria, Australia. It contains several mineral springs that have been used for drinking and bathing since the 1860s. The site is listed on the Victorian Heritage Register and forms part of Hepburn Regional Park.

== History of the Mineral Springs ==
In the 1864 its citizens met at the Savoia Hotel and petitioned the government to protect the mineral springs from mining - the water was rated above gold and the Hepburn Mineral Spring Reserve was created in 1865. Many of its residents came from 'spa' areas in Italy, Germany and England and appreciated its value.

== Bathhouse ==
A bathhouse was created in the 1890s which has been remodelled several times. After an A$13 million redevelopment, the Hepburn Bathhouse & Spa reopened in September 2008.

== Springs ==
Several springs exist in the main reserve – Soda, Sulphur, Pavilion, Locarno and Wyuna. Golden Spring, Hendersons and Lithia Spring are located in the vicinity.
