= Peter Huntley =

Australian rules footballer (born 1961)

Personal information
- Full name: Peter Huntley
- Born: 7 December 1961 (age 64)
- Original team: Creswick
- Height: 185 cm (6 ft 1 in)
- Weight: 76 kg (168 lb)

Playing career^{1}
| Years | Club | Games (Goals) |
| 1981–82 | St Kilda | 4 (0) |
- ^{1} Playing statistics correct to the end of 1982.

Peter Huntley (born 7 December 1961) is a former Australian rules footballer who played with St Kilda in the Victorian Football League (VFL).
