= Brian Hepper =

Australian rules footballer

Personal information
- Full name: Brian John Hepper
- Born: 11 December 1946 (age 79)
- Height: 177 cm (5 ft 10 in)
- Weight: 73 kg (161 lb)

Playing career^{1}
Years	Club	Games (Goals)
1965–66	Fitzroy	8 (1)
- ^{1} Playing statistics correct to the end of 1966.

Brian Hepper (born 11 December 1946) is a former Australian rules footballer who played with Fitzroy in the Victorian Football League (VFL). He is the cousin of Fitzroy footballer Wally Clark.
