= Eric Clarke (footballer) =

Australian rules footballer

Personal information
- Born: 16 February 1957 (age 69)
- Original team: North Ballarat
- Height: 183 cm (6 ft 0 in)
- Weight: 80 kg (176 lb)

Playing career^{1}
Years	Club	Games (Goals)
1980	St Kilda	6 (6)
- ^{1} Playing statistics correct to the end of 1980.

Eric Clarke (born 16 February 1957) is a former Australian rules footballer who played with St Kilda in the Victorian Football League (VFL).

Clarke, an Indigenous Australian, grew up in Creswick. Aged just 16, Clarke played in North Ballarat's 1973 premiership team and was also a member of their 1978 and 1979 premiership sides. In the 1980 VFL season he made six league appearances for St Kilda, where he played as a half forward. After leaving St Kilda, Clarke played for Redan, then returned to North Ballarat.
