= Bungaree Football Club =

Bungaree

Names
- Full name: Bungaree Football & Netball Club
- Nickname: Demons
- Motto: "Every heart beats true"

Club details
- Founded: 1904; 121 years ago
- Colours: navy blue red
- Competition: Central Highlands FL
- Premierships: 13 (1922, 1924, 1947, 1949, 1954, 1956, 1957, 1971, 1973, 1991, 2014)
- Ground: Bungaree Recreation Reserve

Uniforms
Home

Other information
- Official website: bungareefnc.com.au

The Bungaree Football & Netball Club is an Australian rules football and netball club from Bungaree, Victoria which competes in the Central Highlands Football League.

== History ==
The Demons are one of the founding members of the CHFL and play their home games at the Bungaree Recreation Reserve which underwent a full redevelopment in 2012, with the changeroom facility being named the Danny Frawley Pavilion.

Between 1951 and 1959, Bungaree played in nine consecutive Clunes District Football League senior football grand final, winning four of those premiership matches.

Bungaree emerged from a lean decade in the 2000s to play four preliminary finals in a row from 2012–15, culminating in their first premiership in 23 years in 2014 with a 9-goal thrashing of arch rivals Springbank. The Reserves were also able to break their 34-year drought with a comprehensive win over Waubra FC.

Bungaree is most widely recognised through their best export, former St Kilda captain, Victorian representative, the late Danny Frawley.

== Football Premierships ==
Seniors

- Kingston Football Association
  - 1922 - Bungaree: 4.6 - 30 d Newlyn: 3.4 - 22
- Creswick District Football Association
  - 1924 - Bungaree: 6.9 - 45 d Newlyn: 2.1 - 13
- Bungaree District Football Association
  - 1947 - Bungaree: 9.11 - 65 d Springbank: 5.11 - 41
  - 1949 - Bungaree: 1.11 - 17 d Gordon-Egerton: 1.10 - 16
- Clunes District Football League
  - 1954, 1956, 1957, 1959, 1971, 1973, 1976
- Central Highlands Football League
  - 1991
  - 2014 - Bungaree: 16.18 - 114 d Springbank: 7.14 - 56

Reserves

- Clunes District Football League
  - 1972, 1973, 1976, 1977, 1978
- Central Highlands Football League
  - 1979, 1980, 2014, 2024

Under 18

- Clunes District Football League
  - 1972
- Central Highlands Football League
  - 1980, 1989, 1997, 1998, 1999, 2005, 2006, 2007, 2008, 2015

Under 15

- Central Highlands Football League
  - 1988, 2005

== Champion Club ==
THE CHFL awards the Merv & Mary Howard Champion Club award at the conclusion of each home and away season to the club that has performed the best across 4 grades of football and 6 grades of netball. Bungaree have won the award on 10 occasions, double that of the next most successful club.

- CHFL Merv & Mary Howard Champion Club-
  - 1979, 1998, 2001, 2002, 2004, 2006, 2007, 2009, 2011, 2012

== Netball ==
The club fields multiple netball teams in the CHFNL.

== VFL/AFL players ==
- Danny Frawley - St Kilda , Richmond coach
- Maurice Frawley - North Melbourne
- Danny Guinane - Richmond
- Maurice O'Keefe - St Kilda, Geelong
- Harry Cousens - Richmond
