= Lake Learmonth =

Lake in Victoria, Australia

Lake Learmonth (Tombin)
- Location in Victoria
- Location: Victoria
- Coordinates: 37°25′S 143°42′E

Lake Learmonth is a lake located in central Victoria, Australia. The Djadjawurrung and Wathawurrung name for the lake is Tombin.

The lake is a popular spot for water sports, fishing and family activities. It is a natural water-hole and swamp, but was enhanced by human intervention in the late 1800s, resulting in a fuller and more defined lake area. Picnic areas, children's playgrounds and nature walks exist on the Eastern and Northern side of the lake.
