= Springbank Football Netball Club =

Springbank

Names
- Full name: Springbank Football Netball Club
- Nickname(s): Tigers

Club details
- Founded: 1925; 100 years ago
- Colours: Black Yellow
- Competition: Central Highlands Football League
- Premierships: 5 (1990, 2000, 2001, 2015, 2016)
- Ground(s): Recreation Reserve, Wallace

Uniforms
Home

Other information
- Official website: springbankfnc.com.au

Springbank Football Netball Club, nicknamed the Tigers, is an Australian rules football team based in the Central Highlands district of Victoria in the small town of Springbank. The club plays in the Central Highlands Football League.

== History ==
The team was formerly known as the Wallace Rovers they were formed in 1925. The team played for a short time in the Dunnstown Football Association before going into recess in the mid-1930s.

Reforming and joining the Bungaree Football Association, Springbank soon had its first premiership in 1939 then again in 1940. The interruption caused by World War 2 slowed the development of football in the area. Reforming again after the war, Springbank continued in the Bungaree FA until the competition folded and unlike the other clubs that moved to the Clunes FL Springbank went into recess.

A group of enthusiasts reformed the club in 1963 and the club entered the Clunes Football League. Success came immediately with the club winning five premierships in a row.

Springbank's senior side has had the most successful run of all clubs since joining the Central Highlands Football League with five premierships.

In 1996, the Football and Netball Clubs merged to become one incorporated body as the club was re-named Springbank Football Netball Club.

The netball side has been successful across this time with eight premierships in Central Highlands Football League. In 2013, former Australian Diamonds squad member Cynna Kydd and husband Garth signed on to coach winning both A and B grade grand finals in the first year.

== Premierships ==
Senior Football

- Bungaree Football Association
  - 1939, 1940, 1946, 1948
- Clunes Football League
  - 1964, 1965, 1966, 1967, 1968, 1972
- Central Highlands Football League
  - 1990, 2000, 2001, 2015, 2016

A. Grade Netball

- Central Highlands Football League
  - 2004, 2006, 2007, 2008, 2012, 2013, 2015, 2017

== VFL/AFL players ==
- Andrew Tranquilli - Collingwood
- Shannon Donegan - Geelong
- Andy Challis - Gold Coast Suns
- Mitch Grace - Fremantle
- James Reicha - St Kilda
- Matthew Lakey - Richmond
- Tim Knowles - Tasmania Devils

== Bibliography ==
- History of Football in the Ballarat District by John Stoward - ISBN 978-0-9805929-0-0
