= Clunes Football Netball Club =

Clunes FNC Inc.

Names
- Full name: Clunes Football Netball Club
- Nickname: Magpies
- Motto: Committed, United, Proud

2023 season
- After finals: N/A
- Home-and-away season: 12th: 5 wins, 11 losses

Club details
- Founded: 1876; 149 years ago
- Colours: black white
- Competition: Central Highlands Football League
- Premierships: (10) 1934, 1951, 1953, 1958, 1960, 1963, 1978, 1979, 1993, 1997
- Ground: Neil "Bull" Milgate Oval, Ligar St, Clunes, Victoria.

Uniforms
Home

Other information
- Official website: Clunes FC website

The Clunes Football Netball Club is an Australian rules football and Netball club that are based in the former goldrush town of Clunes, Victoria. The footballers play in the Central Highlands Football League and the netballers play in the Central Highlands Netball League, while both leagues are separate entities they are synchronise with each other for the fixtures and finals.

== History ==
The first published Australian Rules football match of "the newly formed" Clunes Football Club took place in Clunes against the Albion Football Club of Ballarat, on Saturday, 24 June 1876. Mr. Finn captained Clunes and the match resulted in a win to Albion.

In September 1879, Carlton's Second Twenty played a match against the Clunes FC in Clunes.

In 1882, Mr. Thomas Anketell was elected President at the Annual Meeting which was held in the Free Library.

In May 1884, Essendon's Second Twenty played a match in against Clunes, which resulted in a win to Essendon.

"After lying dormant for a number of years" (two), Clunes Football Club was reformed in 1913 with Mr. D. McLean as President.

At the club's 1915 meeting, Mr. W J Champion was elected as president.

The club played in various friendly local games from 1876 to 1909. Clunes played in the Creswick & Allendale FA in 1910.

Games were often played midweek in the early days with many players being employed in the mines. Football in the town were often formed from the labour of mining companies and commercial merchants. Teams were formed and a local identity would donate a cup or trophy for competition.

Surprisingly for a club of its age it never was in a structured association until 1910. In 1919, Clunes joined the Creswick District Football Association when it was reformed after World War One. Clunes was unsettled as it twice left the local competition to play in the Maryborough District Football Association.

In 1931 the Clunes Football Association was formed and Clunes was a founding club. The three other clubs were Smeaton, Newstead and Campbelltown. Runners up in the inaugural year it took a few more years before Clunes won its first Premiership in 1934.

Just after the war, a local lad by the name of Bob Davis caught a train and attended preseason training with South Melbourne, but was told he wasn't wanted. As the lad was boarding and attended at Ballarat College. He played locally with Golden Point where he was spotted by Geelong recruiters and he was invited to try out with Geelong.

Clunes was a dominating force during the fifties and sixties, as they played in thirteen CDFL grand finals, for five premiership wins. Clunes won the 1963 CDFL premiership, but then lost four CDFL grand finals in a row to Springbank from 1964 to 1967.

Clunes remained in the Clunes Football League until it merged with the Ballarat and Bacchus Marsh Football League to form the Central Highlands Football League in 1979, with Clunes among the new competition's fifteen founder members.

In the last season of the Clunes Football District League in 1978, it was one of the most climatic in its history as Clunes and Newlyn played out the competition's only ever grand final draw with the scores - Clunes 9.15.69 to Newlyn 10.9.69. A week later, Clunes won the grand final replay, 20.5.125 to Newlyn 7.11.53.

Success again the following year in the new competition with Clunes defeating Ballan 11.13.79 to 11.10.76.

Their two other premierships were in 1993 when they again defeated Ballan 14.14.98 to 12.12.84 and in 1997 when they defeated Dunnstown 13.17.95 to 12.16.88.

Current Essendon player Nick Hind grew up in Clunes and played 49 Senior games for the Clunes Football Netball Club and won the 2014 club Best and Fairest. Nick is currently with the Essendon where he was drafted to in 2021, after playing 21 games for the St. Kilda in 2019–2020.

Football Club Timeline

- 1876 - 1899: Club formed & active playing friendly matches against other local teams.
- 1900 - 1909: Club appears active, but very little published content in newspapers.
- 1910 - Creswick & Allendale District Association
- 1911 - 1912: Club in recess
- 1913 - 1915: Club active, playing some games against other local teams
- 1916 - 1918: Club in recess, due to World War One
- 1919 - 1921: Clunes & Creswick District Football Association
- 1922 - 1924: Maryborough District Football Association
- 1925 - 1926: Creswick District Football Association
- 1927 - 1930: Maryborough District Football Association
- 1931 - 1940: Clunes Football Association
- 1941 - 1944: Club in recess due to World War Two
- 1945 - Maryborough District Football Association
- 1946 - 1978: Clunes Football League
- 1979 - 2024: Central Highlands Football League

== Football premierships ==
Seniors

- Clunes Football League
  - 1934, 1951, 1953, 1958, 1960, 1963, 1978,
- Central Highlands Football League
  - 1979 - Clunes: 11.13 - 79 d Ballan: 11.10 - 76
  - 1993 - Clunes: 14.14 - 98 d Ballan: 12.12 - 84
  - 1997 - Clunes: 13.17 - 95 d Dunnstown: 12.16 - 88

Reserves

- Central Highlands Football League
  - 1998

Juniors

- Creswick District Football Association
  - 1932 - Clunes Juniors: 5.10 - 40 d Creswick Juniors: 2.9 - 21

== Football Runners Up ==
Seniors

- Creswick District Football Association
  - 1926
- Maryborough & District Football Association
  - 1930 - Dunnolly: 11.8 - 74 d Clunes (minor premiers): 6.8 - 44
- Clunes District Football Association
  - 1931, 1932, 1936, 1950, 1954, 1956, 1957, 1964, 1965, 1966, 1967,
- Maryborough District Football Association
  - 1945: Patience & Nicholson: 13.18 - 96 d Clunes: 6.14 - 50

Clunes Imperial FC

- Creswick District Football Association
  - Creswick Rovers: 5.4 - 34 d Clunes Imperial: 1.11 - 17

== VFL / AFL players ==
- 1948 - Bob Davis - Geelong
- 1955 - Graham Donaldson - Carlton
- 2019 - Nick Hind - Essendon / St Kilda

== Club jumper history ==
- 1919: the club adopted the Collingwood colours of black and white vertical stripes.
- 1931: the stripe was changed to black with a white stripe down the middle.
- 1933: this was reversed back to white with a black stripe down the middle.
- 1945: saw the club sporting a black jumper with white collar and cuffs with a CFC monogram.
- 1973: the club reverted to the Collingwood stripes.
- 1979: the club switched to white with a black stripe down the middle.
- 1982: the club switched to black with a white V yolk.
- 1987: the club again switched back to the Collingwood stripes.

== Clunes District Football Association ==
The Clunes District Football Association was formed in 1931.

Reg Coles from Daylesford won the 1937 league best and fairest award and H Dwan won it in 1938.

In 1940, the Clunes Football League was made up with eight teams.

	Clunes DFA: Senior Football - Grand Final Scores					
Year	Premiers	Score	Runner up	Score	Venue	Gate / Comments
Clunes District Football Association
1931	Smeaton	12.8 - 80	Clunes	11.11 - 77	Newstead	
1932	Newlyn	6.7 - 43	Clunes	5.8 - 38		
Clunes District Football League
1933	Newstead	7.10 - 52	Bungaree	1.13 - 19	Smeaton	Clunes: 3rd
1934	Clunes	6.15 - 51	Newlyn	5.6 - 36	Daylesford	£59
1935	Newlyn	15.16 - 106	Daylesford	5.4 - 34		
1936	Newlyn	9.19 - 73	Clunes	5.4 - 34		
1937	Smeaton	11.8 - 74	Newlyn	6.10 - 46		
1938	Newlyn	15.9 - 99	Smeaton	11.10 - 76		
1939	Sebastopol	12.18 - 90	Creswick	12.8 - 80		
1940	Creswick	11.11 - 77	Smeaton	10.15 - 75		
1941-45						In recess > WW2
1946	Smeaton	10.12 - 72	Creswick Forestry	8.13 - 61		
1947	Smeaton	12.12 - 84	Creswick Forestry	9.10 - 64		Clunes: 3rd
1948	Smeaton	9.12 - 66	Newlyn	6.8 - 44		
1949	Newlyn	13.17 - 95	Hepburn	8.8 - 56		
1950	Creswick	10.3 - 63	Clunes	4.10 - 34		
1951	Clunes	7.9 - 51	Bungaree	5.6 - 36		
1952	Learmonth	8.9 - 57	Bungaree	4.7 - 31		
1953	Clunes	11.6 - 72	Bungaree	7.14 - 56		
1954	Bungaree	9.12 - 66	Clunes	5.14 - 44		
1955	Learmonth	13.9 - 87	Bungaree	11.13 - 79		
1956	Bungaree	5.7 - 37	Clunes	4.2 - 26		
1957	Bungaree	12.7 - 79	Clunes	6.8 - 54		
1958	Clunes	6.11 - 47	Bungaree	3.11 - 29		
1959	Bungaree	16.7 - 103	Creswick	6.6 - 42		
1960	Clunes	16.9 - 105	Creswick	11.4 - 70		
1961	Creswick	9.11 - 65	Newlyn	5.7 - 37		
1962	Newlyn	7.10 - 52	Creswick	4.7 - 31		
1963	Clunes	10.17 - 77	Koreweinguboora	7.8 - 50		
1964	Springbank	12.7 - 79	Clunes	7.9 - 51		
1965	Springbank	10.12 - 72	Clunes	10.9 - 69		
1966	Springbank	10.10 - 70	Clunes	7.7 - 49		
1967	Springbank	15.9 - 99	Clunes	6.10 - 46		
1968	Springbank	10.13 - 73	Creswick	10.9 - 69		
1969	Newlyn	13.5 - 83	Creswick	11.12 - 78		
1970	Newlyn	18.11 - 119	Bungaree	8.10 - 58		
1971	Bungaree	12.7 - 79	Creswick	6.6 - 42		
1972	Springbank	13.15 - 93	Bungaree	12.17 - 89		
1973	Bungaree	18.14 - 122	Wendouree	7.12 - 54		
1974	Creswick	11.15 - 81	Bungaree	4.3 - 27		
1975	Newlyn	18.23 - 131	Bungaree	9.10 - 64		
1976	Bungaree	17.14 - 116	Springbank	16.12 - 108		
1977	Wendouree	10.19 - 79	Learmonth	11.9 - 75		
1978	Clunes	9.15 - 69	Newlyn	10.9 - 69		Drawn G Final
	Clunes	20.5 - 125	Newlyn	7.11 - 53		G Final Reply
1979: Clunes DFL & Ballarat / Bacchus Marsh DFL merged to form the Central Highlands FNL
Year	Premiers	Score	Runner Up	Score	Venue	Gate/Comments

Reserves

- 1977 - Bungaree: 8.5 - 53 d Hepburn: 6.10 - 46

Juniors

- 1963 - Newlyn: 7.9 - 51 d Creswick: 4.6 - 30
- 1964 - Creswick: 7.5 - 47 d Learmonth: 1.3 - 9

Under 18's

- 1968 - Creswick: 5.12 - 42 d Bungaree: 5.6 - 36

== Book ==
History of Football in the Ballarat District by John Stoward - ISBN 978-0-9805929-0-0
