= Spargo Creek =

- Town
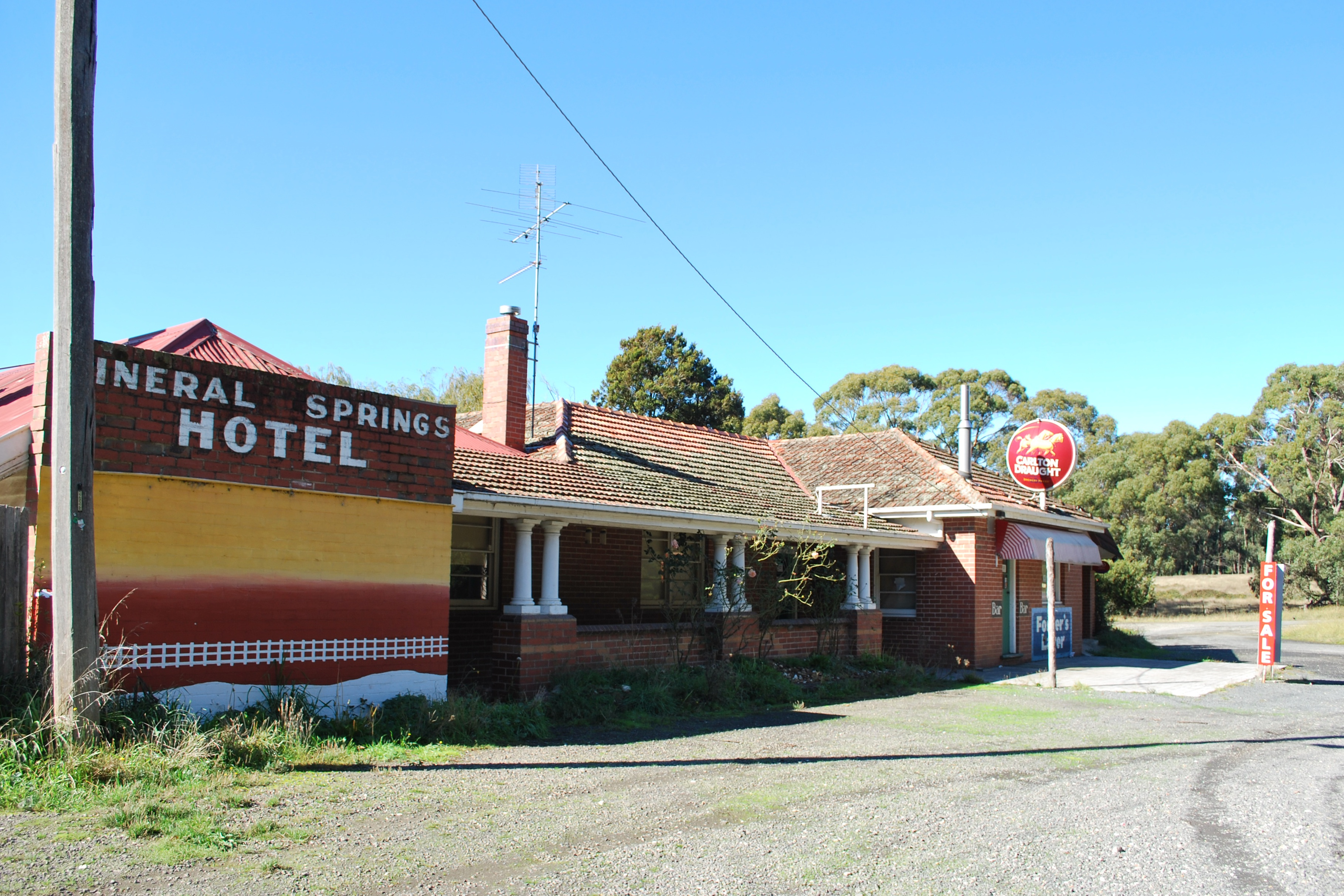
- The Mineral Springs Hotel at Spargo Creek

- Coordinates: 37°28′47″S 144°09′02″E
- Country: Australia
- State: Victoria
- LGA: Shire of Moorabool
- Location: 96 km (60 mi) NW of Melbourne; 34 km (21 mi) NE of Ballarat; 18 km (11 mi) SE of Daylesford

Government
  - State electorate: Eureka
  - Federal division: Ballarat

Population
  - Total: 36 (2016 census)
- Postcode: 3461

Spargo Creek is a locality in central Victoria, Australia. The locality is in the Shire of Moorabool, 96 kilometres (60 mi) north west of the state capital, Melbourne and 34 kilometres (21 mi) north east of the regional city of Ballarat.

At the 2016 census, Spargo Creek had a population of 36.
