= Hepburn Football Club =

Hepburn FNC Inc.

Names
- Full name: Hepburn Football Netball Club
- Nickname: Burras

Club details
- Founded: 1919
- Colours: blue red
- Competition: Central Highlands FL
- Premierships: (14) 1930, 1934, 1937, 1938, 1939, 1985, 1986, 1989, 2004, 2005, 2008, 2010, 2013, 2017
- Ground: Hepburn Recreation Reserve

Uniforms
Home

The Hepburn Football Netball Club, nicknamed the 'Burras, is an Australian rules football and netball club that plays in the town of Hepburn Springs, Victoria, Australia, and plays in the Central Highlands Football League. The colours of the club are red and blue.

== Club history ==
Football in the Victorian town of Hepburn Springs dates back to the 1860s and a team was fielded in 1864 but it wasn't until approximately 1919, after World War I, that the Hepburn Football Club was officially founded and represented the town in an organised competition.

Hepburn FC had a golden era during the 1930's playing in ten grand finals in the Daylesford District Football Association between 1930 and 1939, in which the Burras compiled a successful history, claiming premierships in 1930, 1934, 1937, 1938 and 1939.

After World War II, Hepburn moved to the Clunes Football Association and were runners up in 1949 grand final, Newlyn by 31 points.

In 1979, the Clunes Football League and the Bacchus Marsh Ballarat District Football League amalgamated to form the Central Highlands Football League and Hepburn were one of the founding members of the new competition.

After first contesting the finals in 1985, the Burras improved and went on to win a CHFL record-breaking nine senior premierships, the most recent being in 2017 at Mars Stadium when they beat minor premiers Beaufort 15.15.105 to 13.9.87.

The club celebrated its 150th anniversary in 2014.

== Football Premierships ==
=== Seniors ===
- Daylesford District Football Association
  - 1930,
  - 1934,
  - 1937,
  - 1938
  - 1939
- Central Highlands Football League
  - 1985, 1986, 1989, 2004, 2005, 2008, 2010, 2013, 2017
