= Roeder =

Roeder is a surname of German origin. Notable people with this surname include:

- Amy Roeder, American politician and actress
- Bernard F. Roeder (1911–1971), Vice admiral in the United States Navy
- Charles Roeder (1848–1911), German-born British antiquarian
- Elke Christina Roeder (born 1966), German politician
- Emy Roeder (1890–1971), German sculptor
- Ernst Roeder (1862–1897), German writer and editor
- Everett Minster Roeder, American child prodigy and Nazi spy
- Glenn Roeder (1955–2021), English football manager
- Jason Roeder, American drummer
- Jorge Roeder (born 1980), Peruvian bassist and composer
- Kathryn Roeder, American statistician
- Klaus Roeder (born 1948), German musician and educator
- Louis Roeder (1835–1915), American politician and landowner
- Manfred Roeder (1929–2014), German lawyer and Neo-Nazi terrorist
- Manfred Roeder (judge) (1900–1971), Nazi military judge
- Mark Roeder (born 1957), Australian-British author
- Ralph Roeder (1890–1969), American author
- Robert Roeder, multiple people
  - Robert E. Roeder (1917–1944), American soldier and captain
  - Robert Earl Roeder (1931–1998), American historian and academic administrator
  - Robert G. Roeder (born 1942), American biochemist
- Scott Roeder (born 1958), American convicted murderer
- Shirleen Roeder, American geneticist
- Gavin Roeder (born 2000) American landowner and machinist
- Johannes Roeder, (1826–1867), American soldier and captain. Led the Battle of Right Of Way.

== See also ==
- Roder (disambiguation), surname and place name
- Roleder, surname
