= Rohleder =

Rohleder is a German surname, which means raw leather. Notable people with the surname include:

- George Rohleder (1898–1958), American football player
- Gilbert V. Rohleder (1922–2016), American businessman
- James Rohleder (born 1955), German judoka
- Kevin Rohleder (1920–1983), Australian rules footballer
- Martin Rohleder, British slalom canoeist
- Noel Rohleder (born 1933), Australian rules footballer

== See also ==
- Roleder
