= Rokewood-Corindhap Football Netball Club =

Rokewood Corindhap

Names
- Full name: Rokewood Corindhap Football Netball Club
- Nickname: Grasshoppers

Club details
- Founded: 1931; 95 years ago
- Colours: green white
- Competition: Central Highlands FL
- Premierships: 10 (1947, 1957, 1963, 1967, 1978, 1979, 1992, 1993, 1994, 2002)
- Ground: Rockwood Recreation Reserve

Uniforms
Home

The Rokewood Corindhap Football Netball Club is an Australian rules football club from Rokewood, Victoria which competes in the Central Highlands Football League. The Grasshoppers joined the league in 2011 after the Lexton Plains FL disbanded.

== History ==
Rokewood-Corindhap FC

Established in 1931 during the height of the Great Depression, following the merger of the Rokewood and Corindhap Football Clubs. The club initially played in the Rokewood & Cape Clear District Football Association between 1931 and 1934, losing the 1933 grand final to Illabarook.

The Grasshoppers moved to the Western Plains Football League in 1935 to join their nearest neighbour, Illabarook. The club had to wait until after World War II to win its first flag.

The club won nine flags in the Western Plains Football League, including a hat-trick from 1992 to 1994. The Western Plains Football League merged with the Lexton Football League in 1999, forming the Lexton Plains Football League.

The Grasshoppers previously competed in the Lexton Plains Football League from 1999 to 2010, but the league folded at the end of the 2010 season, then joined the Central Highlands Football League in 2011.

Corindhap FC (1893 to 1930)

The Corindhap FC was established in 1893. The club played in the following football competitions -

- 1893 - Club active playing friendly matches against other local towns.
- 1894 - Rokewood & District Football Association
- 1895 - Ballarat Football Association / Baby Nicholl Variety Troupe Football Trophy
- 1896 - Rokewood & District Football Association
- 1897 - 1907: The club appears to be in recess
- 1907 - 1908: Club active, but no official competition football
- 1909 - The club appears to be in recess
- 1910 - Club active, but no official competition football
- 1911 - 1913: The club appears to be in recess
- 1914 - Club active, but no official competition football
- 1915 - Corindhap FC and Rokewood FC merge and play in the Rokewood Football Association Runners Up
- 1916 - 1919: Club in recess due to World War One
- 1920 - 1924: Rokewood Football Association
- 1925 - 1930: Rokewood / Cape Clear District Football Association

Rokewood FC (1888 to 1930)

In 1888, there was a cup gifted to the Skipton Football Club by a Charles Wilson and the Skipton FC set up a local football competition between the following clubs - Beautfort, Carngham, Lake Bolac, Linton, Rokewood, Scaresdaleand Smythesdale. The first published match review for Rokewood FC was in 1890 after a match against Dereel FC at Rokewood, which resulted in a win to Rokewood. The club played in the following football competitions -

- 1888 - Charles Wilson Cup Premiers: Skipton FC
- 1889 - Charles Wilson Cup
- 1890 - 1893: Club active playing friendly matches against other local towns.
- 1894 - Rokewood & District Football Association Premiers
- 1895 - Ballarat District Football Association (Baby Nicholl Trophy):
- 1896 - Rokewood & District Football Association:
- 1897 - 1901: The club appears to be in recess
- 1902 - Club active. Played a match against Lismore.
- 1903 - 1905: The club appears to be in recess
- 1906 - Club active. Played a match against Berringa.
- 1907 - 1913: Club appears to be recess
- 1914 - The club reformed in May 1914 and played in the Cressy Football Association.
- 1915 - Corindhap FC and Rokewood FC merge. Rokewood Football Association Runners Up
- 1916 - 1919: Club in recess due to World War One
- 1920 - 1924: Rokewood Football Association by Rokewood Junction FC
- 1925 - 1930: Rokewood & Cape Clear District Football Association by Rokewood FC

== Leagues and Premierships ==
Rokewood-Corindhap Football Club

- Linton Carngham District Football Association (1931–1934)
  - Nil
- Western Plains Football League (1935–1998)
  - 1947, 1957, 1963, 1967, 1978, 1979, 1992, 1993, 1994
- Lexton Plains Football League (1999–2010)
  - 2002
- Central Highlands Football League (2011–present)
  - Nil

Rokewood Football Club - Premierships

- Rokewood & District Football Association
  - 1894
- Rokewood & Cape Clear District Football Association
  - 1926 - Rokewood: 5.7 - 37 d Illabarook: 3.4 - 22
  - 1928 - Rokewood: 6.6 - 42 d Illabarook: 4.11 - 35

Corindhap Football Club - Premierships

- Rokewood & District Football Association
  - 1921 - Corindhap: 4.6 - 30 d Illabarook Cape Clear: 1.4 - 10
  - 1922 - Corindhap: 5.2 - 32 d Rokewood/Werneth: 2.5 - 17

== League Best and Fairest Winners ==
Senior Football

- Western Plains Football League - Henry Brunn Cup
  - 1963 - Gary Dark
- Lexton Plains Football League - Peter Smith Medal
  - 2007 - Karl Begbie

== VFL/AFL players ==
- 1949 - Russell Middlemiss – Geelong
- 1964 - Gary Dark - Footscray

== Bibliography ==
- History of Football in the Ballarat District by John Stoward – ISBN 978-0-9805929-0-0
