= Roder (disambiguation) =

Roder is a village in Luxembourg.

Roder, Röder or Rőder may also refer to:

== Geography ==
- Große Röder, river in Brandenburg and Saxony, Germany
- Kleine Röder (Black Elster), river in Brandenburg, Germany
- Kleine Röder (Große Röder), river in Saxony, Germany
- Schwarze Röder, river in Saxony, Germany

== People ==
- Berndt Röder (born 1948), German politician
- Dechen Roder (born 1980), Bhutanese filmmaker
- Enno Röder (1935–2019), German cross-country skier
- Erhard Ernst von Röder (1665-1743), Prussian field marshal
- Franz-Josef Röder (1909-1979), German politician
- Friedrich Erhard von Röder (1768–1834), Prussian officer during the Napoleonic Wars
- Johann Michael Röder (fl. 1708-1746), German organ builder
- Klaus Röder (born 1948), German musician
- Matthias Röder (born 1972), German canoeist
- Mirro Roder (1944–2021), Czech-born American football placekicker
- Nigel Roder (born 1967), English court jester
- Reinhard Roder (born 1941), German football player and manager
- Rick Roder, baseball umpire
- Vilmos Rőder (1881-1969), Hungarian officer

== See also ==
- Arenz, Röder and Dagmar v. Germany, UN Human Rights Committee case
- Rode (disambiguation), a surname and placename
- Roeder, surname
