= Heyme =

Heyme is a German surname. Notable people with the surname include:

- Geoff Heyme (born 1942), Australian rules footballer
- Hansgünther Heyme (born 1935), German theatre director
