= Serrala =

Finance automation company

Serrala Group GmbH
- Type: Private company
- Industry: Financial technology
- Founded: January 1, 1984; 42 years ago
- Founder: Hans Herbert Lindemann
- Headquarters: Norderstedt, Germany
- Area served: Worldwide
- Key people: Axel Rebien (CEO)
- Services: Finance automation; financial software
- Number of employees: 700 (2021)
- Website: www.serrala.com

Serrala is a German software company headquartered in Norderstedt, near Hamburg, that develops financial automation software. It was founded in 1984 by the software entrepreneur Hans Herbert Lindemann as Hanse Orga and was renamed Serrala in 2018. The private equity firm Hg holds a majority stake in Serrala.

== History ==
=== Hanse Orga (1984–2018) ===
Serrala's predecessor, Hanse Orga, was founded in 1984 by the software entrepreneur Hans Herbert Lindemann. The company began developing finance software integrated with SAP enterprise resource planning in the 1980s.

In 2012, Sven Lindemann, Hans Herbert Lindemann's son, took over as chairman from his father. He expanded the company's international presence, particularly in the United States.

In 2016, the Dutch private equity firm Waterland acquired a stake in the family-owned Hanse Orga, and the Lindemann family retained under 50 percent.

In 2016–2017, Hanse Orga expanded through a series of acquisitions in Germany and the US. Integrating the acquired companies required substantial resources and was associated with operational difficulties.

=== Serrala (2018–present) ===
In 2018, the company changed its name from Hanse Orga to Serrala. According to then-chief executive Sven Lindemann, the name was intended to work internationally, alluding both to the Hindi word saral, meaning "simple", and to the mountain range Sierra de la Serrella in Spain.

In 2021, Serrala announced an investment of €50 million in a new headquarters at the Nordport site in Norderstedt, to which it planned to relocate 400 of its 700 employees.

In May 2021, Waterland had put Serrala up for sale, working with Deutsche Bank and expecting to benefit from high valuations in the payments-technology sector. Of around 40 parties invited to the process many withdrew after learning the seller's price expectations. In August 2021 Hg acquired a majority stake in Serrala. The Lindemann family and Waterland reduced their holdings.

== Products and services ==
Serrala develops software for financial automation, including the processing of payments, accounts receivable, accounts payable and treasury management.

The company's treasury software originated as SAP add-ons in the 1980s. When SAP formalized its "Clean Core" strategy, it became more difficult for third-party vendors to deploy their solutions, but Serrala confirmed its compliance with SAP S/4HANA. The company also developed an ERP-independent cloud platform.

The industry research firms IDC, Forrester and Gartner have assessed Serrala in their reports covering the finance automation software market.

== See also ==
- BlackLine Systems
- Versapay
- Bill.com
- Tipalti
