= Carngham Linton Football Netball Club =

Australian Rules football and netball club

Carngham Linton

Names
- Full name: Carngham Linton Football Netball Club
- Nickname: Saints

Club details
- Founded: 1969; 57 years ago
- Colours: black white red
- Competition: Central Highlands Football League
- Premierships: 17 (1974, 1976, 1982, 1983, 1984, 1985, 1987, 1989, 1990, 1995, 1997, 1998, 2000, 2004, 2006, 2007, 2008)
- Ground: Linton Recreation Reserve, Linton

Uniforms
Home

The Carngham Linton Football Netball Club is an Australian Rules football and netball club from Linton which competes in the Central Highlands Football League. They previously played in the Western Plains Football League and the Lexton Plains Football League.

== History of football in the district ==
The first published team list for the Carngham Football Club was published in September 1878 for a match against Skipton, played at Carngham, which resulted in a draw. Then in 1879, there was newspaper reports published for two matches between Carngham and Linton. Carngham won on both occasions. Grenville Football Association was formed in 1901, with Carngham one of its founding clubs, which was won by Smythesdale.

Carngham played in the Grenville Football Association in 1908.

In 1909, the Scarsdale Football Association was formed between the clubs of Skipton, Carngham, Linton, and Scarsdale.

In 1919, the Linton & District Football Association was founded, and Skipton, Carngham, and Linton played in the competition. The Scarsdale Football Club joined in 1923.

Over the years of competition in the LDFA, football fever developed into hatred and bitter rivalry between the local towns. Linton won LDFA premierships in 1919, 1920, 1922, and 1925.

The Linton-Scarsdale District Football Association was formed in 1925, with the addition of Bradvale and Lismore. The name was changed again in 1927 to the Linton-Skipton Association after Carngham and Scarsdale transferred to the Rokewood-Cape Clear Association.

Linton joined the Rokewood-Cape Clear Association in 1930, which became the Cape Clear-Carngham Association in 1934, then the Linton-Carngham Association in 1936, with Skipton again ending the season runner-up to Illabarook.

In 1937, Carngham lost to Skipton in a closely contested grand final, but the tables were turned in 1938 when Carngham beat Skipton. Carngham again won in 1939. After 1940, the association went into recess due to World War II.

After football resumed in the area in 1946, the Linton-Carngham Association was dominated by Carngham, who won six of seven premierships after the war. In 1953, the clubs in the Linton-Carngham Football League all rolled into the Western Plains Football League.

Linton stayed in the Western Plains Football League and won its final premiership and first for thirty-seven years in 1962. The club then struggled for success and players before going into recess in 1968. Carngham would transfer to the Ballarat Football League District section without success until merging with its neighbour in 1968.

Carngham FC Timeline

- 1878 - 1900: Club established, first match. Club played many friendly matches intermittently against other local towns.
- 1893 - Western District Premiers: Carngham FC
- 1901 - Grenville Football Association - Premiers: Symthesdale, 2nd Carngham
- 1902 - 1907: Club active, but no official competition football
- 1908 - : Smythesdale District Football Association Premiers: Carngham FC
- 1909 - Scarsdale District Football Association
- 1910 - 1911: The club may have been in recess?
- 1912 - 1913: Linton & District Football Association. Premiers: ?
- 1914 - 1915: ?
- 1916 - 1917: Senior club in recess due to World War One. Juniors active.
- 1918 - Club active, but no official competition football
- 1919 - Linton & District Football Association: Premiers - Linton FC
- 1920 - Linton & District Football Association: Premiers - Linton d Carngham
- 1921 - Linton & District Football Association: Premiers: Skipton d Linton
- 1922 - Linton & District Football Association: Premiers: Linton d Carngham
- 1923 - Linton & District Football Association: Premiers: Skipton d Carngham
- 1924 - Linton & District Football Association: Premiers: Skipton d Linton
- 1925 - Linton Scarsdale District Football Association: Premiers: Linton d Skipton
- 1926 - Linton Scarsdale District Football Association: Premiers: Carngham d Scarsdale
- 1927 - 1934: Rokewood & Cape Clear DFA
- 1935 - Cape Clear Carngham DFA
- 1936 - 1952: Linton Carngham DFA
- 1952 - 1961: Western Plains Football League
- 1962 - 1968: Ballarat District Football League
- 1969 - 1998: Western Plains Football League: Carngham FC & Linton FC merge to form Carngham / Linton FC in 1969

Linton FC Timeline

- 1879 - 1900: Club established and active, but no competition football
- 1901 - Pitfield DFA - Premiers: Pitfield
- 1902 - Grenville Shire FA
- 1903 - Club active, but no competition football
- 1904 - Scarsdale & DFA
- 1905 - Grenville Shire FA - Premiers: Linton
- 1906 - 1908: Club active, but unsure what association Linton played in.
- 1910 - 1911: Scarsdale & DFA: Premiers - Scarsdale d Linton
- 1912 - 1914: Linton & District FA 1914 Premiers: Berringa d Linton
- 1915 - Linton & District FA: Premiers - Linton d Berringa
- 1916 - 1917: Club in recess due to World War One, but the junior team was active
- 1918 - Club active playing several matches to raise funds for the Red Cross
- 1919 - 1924: Linton & District FA
- 1925 - 1926: Linton Scarsdale & DFA
- 1927 - 1929: Lismore Skipton FA
- 1930 - 1934: Rokewood & Cape Clear DFA
- 1935 - Cape Clear Carngham FA
- 1936 - 1940: Linton Carngham FA
- 1941 - 1945: Club in recess, due to WW1
- 1946 - 1952: Linton Carngham FA
- 1953 - 1968: Western Plains Football League
- 1969 - 1998: Western Plains Football League Carngham FC & Linton FC merge to form Carngham / Linton FC in 1969

== History of the club ==
After many years of talking, an agreement was reached to merge the two clubs in 1969. Carngham Linton Football Club first took the field in 1969 in the Western Plains Football League.

Over the next thirty years, the club won twelve premierships, including four in a row from 1982 to 1985.

When the Western Plains Football League merged with the Lexton Football League in 1999 to form the Lexton Plains Football League, Carngham Linton Football Netball Club won five of the 12 premierships in that league.

In 2011, the Lexton Plains Football League stopped operating, so the club transferred to the Central Highlands Football League.

== Leagues and Premierships ==
Senior Football
Carngham Linton FNC (1969 to 2026)

- Western Plains Football League (1969–1998)
  - 1974, 1976, 1982, 1983, 1984, 1985, 1987, 1989, 1990, 1995, 1997, 1998
- Lexton Plains Football League (1999–2010)
  - 2000, 2004, 2006, 2007, 2008
- Central Highlands Football League (2011- )
  - Nil

Carngham FC (1878 to 1968)

- Western District
  - 1893
- Linton - Scarsdale DFA
  - 1926
- Rokewood & Cape Clear DFA
  - 1927
- Linton Carngham DFA
  - 1938, 1939, 1946, 1947, 1948, 1949, 1952

Linton FC (1879 to 1968)

- Grenville Shire FA
  - 1905
- Linton & DFA
  - 1915, 1919, 1920, 1922, 1925
- Western Plains Football League
  - 1962

== League Best & Fairest Winners ==
Senior Football

- Western Plains Football League
  - 1977 - Hans Verdoorn
  - 1979 - Hans Verdoorn
  - 1985 - Eugene Grigg
  - 1987 - Eugene Grigg
  - 1998 - Nick McIntosh
- Lexton Plains Football League
  - 2003 - Ross Waters
  - 2009 - Jason Hill

== Books ==
- Great Plains: The history of football and netball in the Western Plains district. By Michael O'Bernie and Darren Prentice
- History of Football in the Ballarat District by John Stoward - ISBN 978-0-9805929-0-0
