= Robert Roeder =

Robert Roeder may refer to:

- Robert E. Roeder (1917–1944), recipient of the United States Medal of Honor
- Robert Earl Roeder (1931–1998), historian and academic administrator
- Robert G. Roeder (born 1942), received the Albert Lasker Award for Basic Medical Research
