= Norderstedt =

- Town
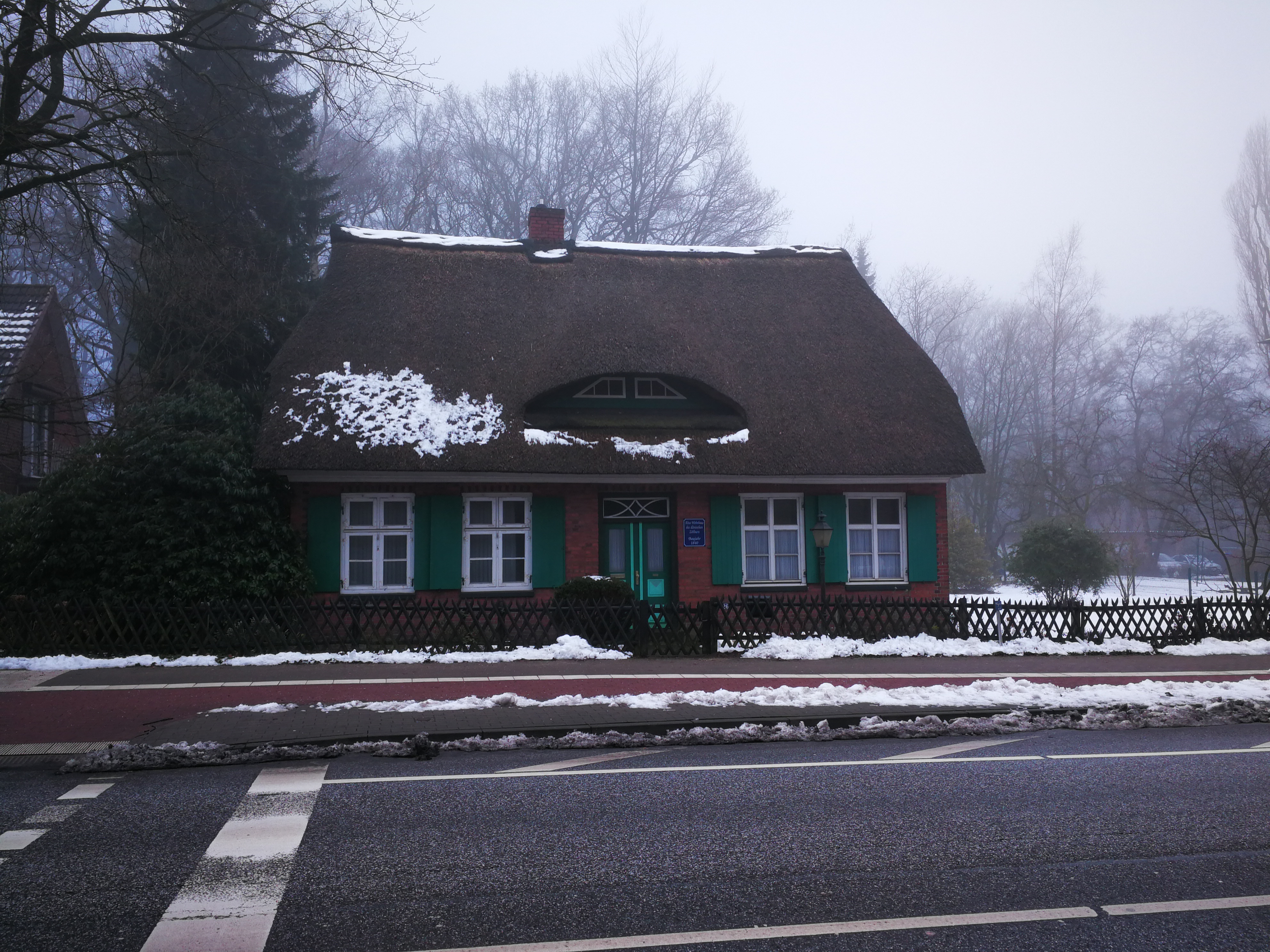
- Danish customs house from 1840

- Coat of arms

- Location of Norderstedt within Kreis Segeberg district
- Interactive map of Norderstedt
- Location within Germany Location within Schleswig-Holstein
- Coordinates: 53°42′23″N 10°0′37″E
- Country: Germany
- State: Schleswig-Holstein
- District: Kreis Segeberg
- Subdivisions: Garstedt, Harksheide, Friedrichsgabe, Glashütte, Mitte

Government
  - Mayor: Elke Christina Roeder (SPD)

Area
  - Total: 58.1 km^{2} (22.4 sq mi)
- Elevation: 36 m (118 ft)

Population (2025-12-31)
  - Total: 83,196
  - Density: 1,430/km^{2} (3,710/sq mi)
- Time zone: UTC+01:00 (CET)
  - Summer (DST): UTC+02:00 (CEST)
- Postal codes: 22844–22851
- Dialling codes: 040
- Vehicle registration: SE
- Website: www.norderstedt.de

Norderstedt (German pronunciation: [ˈnɔʁdɐˌʃteːt]; Northern Low Saxon: Noordersteed) is a city in Germany and part of the Hamburg Metropolitan Region (Metropolregion Hamburg), the fourth largest city (with approximately 84,100 inhabitants as of 2023) in the federal state of Schleswig-Holstein, belonging to the Segeberg district.

== History ==
Norderstedt was created by the merger of four villages on 1 January 1970: the villages of Friedrichsgabe and Garstedt, both belonging to the Pinneberg district, and the villages of Glashütte and Harksheide, both belonging to the Stormarn district. The newly created city was assigned to the Segeberg district.

== Location ==
The city hall of Norderstedt is located at 53°42′29″N 9°59′37″E. Norderstedt is the southernmost city of Segeberg district, bordering with Hamburg in the south and forms part of Hamburg agglomeration.

== Transport and logistics ==
Norderstedt is served by the Autobahn (federal motorway) A 7/E 45 via exit number 23 Hamburg-Schnelsen-Nord (Norderstedt-Süd), located on Hamburg territory, in the southwest, and exit number 21 Quickborn in the northwest. Major thoroughfares are the federal highways B 432 in west-east and B 433 in north-south directions.

The closest airport is that of Hamburg (IATA airport code HAM), whose runway 33 extends across the state border into Norderstedt.

Norderstedt does not have a Deutsche Bahn railway station. However, the north-south AKN railway line A2 operated by AKN Eisenbahn, which runs between Ulzburg Süd in the north and Norderstedt Mitte in the south, services the city. Norderstedt Mitte is also the northern terminus of the Hamburg underground/subway line U1 and an interchange point for a variety of busses. Travel time from Hamburg Central Station to Norderstedt Mitte is 40 minutes. The other two stations of the U1 line in the city of Norderstedt are Richtweg and Garstedt.

Norderstedt is covered by the postal codes 22844, 22846, 22848, 22850 and 22851. The UN/LOCODE abbreviation for Norderstedt is DENOT.

== Economy ==
Due to its proximity to Hamburg Airport, the Port of Hamburg and major transport links, Norderstedt has developed as a business location. One of the city's major commercial developments is the Nordport business park, where international companies including Casio, tesa, Condair and Serrala have established operations.

== Twin towns – sister cities ==
Norderstedt is twinned with:

- Kohtla-Järve, Estonia (1989)
- Maromme, France (1966)
- Oadby and Wigston, England, United Kingdom (1977)
- Zwijndrecht, Netherlands (1981)

== Notable people ==
- Ernst Bader (1914–1999), actor, composer and songwriter, lived and died there
- Oliver Bendt (born 1946), singer and founder of Goombay Dance Band, lives there
- Uwe Seeler (1936–2022), footballer, lived and died there
- Tom Shaka (born 1953), American singer-songwriter, lives there
- Armin von Gerkan (1881–1969), Baltic German classical archaeologist, lived and died there

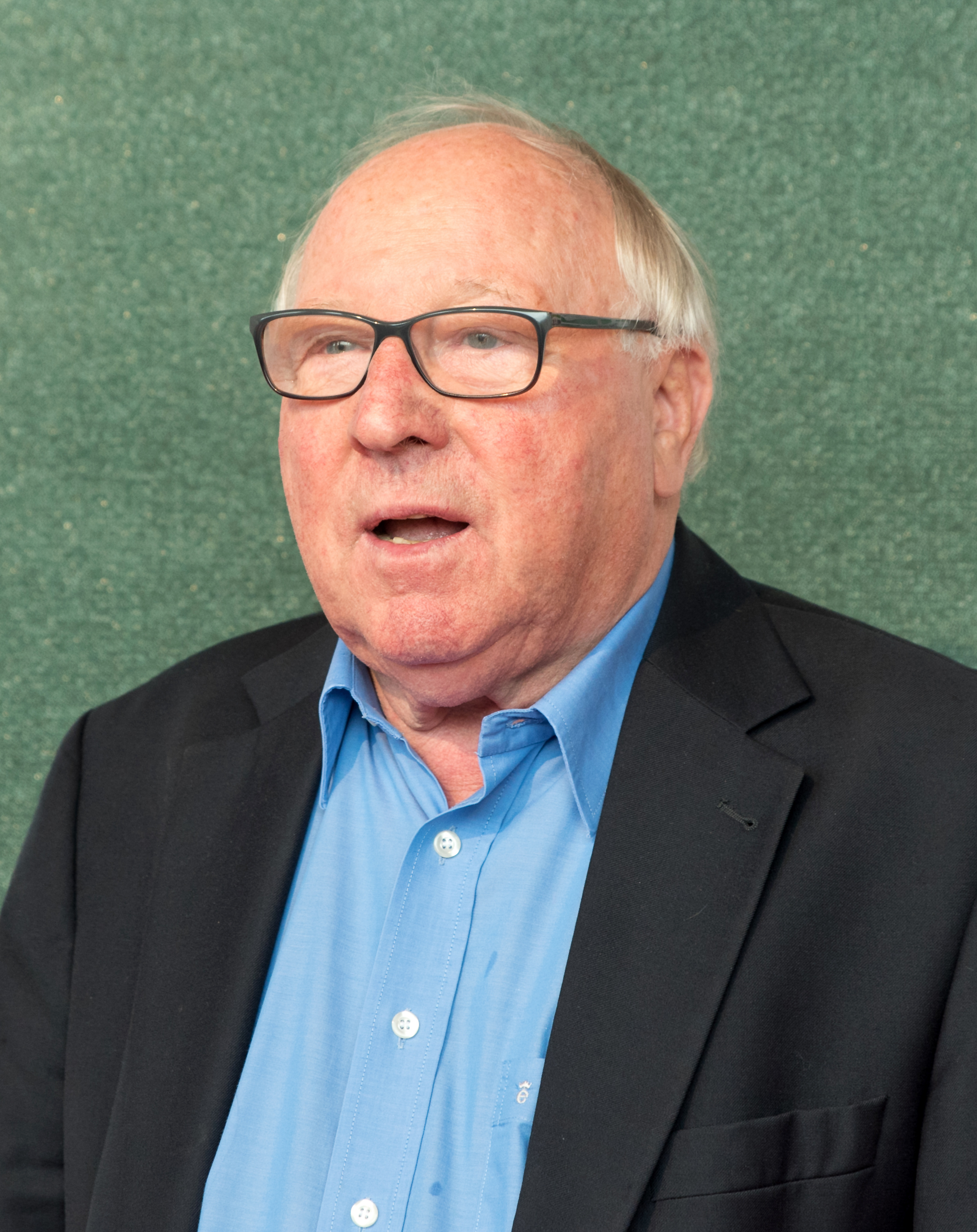
Uwe Seeler, 2016
