= Bill Brown (footballer, born 1906) =

Australian rules footballer

Personal information
- Full name: William John Brown
- Born: 17 June 1906; Newport, Victoria
- Died: 20 April 1981 (aged 74); Brunswick, Victoria
- Original team: Altona
- Height: 169 cm (5 ft 7 in)
- Weight: 66 kg (146 lb)

Playing career^{1}
Years	Club	Games (Goals)
1926, 1928	Hawthorn	12 (0)
1929, 1931	Yarraville (VFA)	
- ^{1} Playing statistics correct to the end of 1928.

William John Brown (17 June 1906 – 20 April 1981) was an Australian rules footballer who played for the Hawthorn Football Club in the Victorian Football League (VFL).

== Family ==
The son of William James Brown (1875–1925) and Charlotte Brown, nee Edwards (1875–1965), William John Brown was born in Newport, Victoria on 17 June 1906

== Football ==
Brown joined Hawthorn from Altona in 1926 and played a total of 12 senior games over his three seasons at the club.

He was granted a clearance to Yarraville in the Victoria Football Association in July 1928 but did not receive a permit to play until 1929 and he played with Yarraville until 1931.

== Death ==
William Brown died at Brunswick on 20 April 1981 and was cremated at Altona Memorial Cemetery.
