= Stuart Magee =

Northern Irish born player and coach of Australian rules football

Personal information
- Full name: Stuart Michael Magee
- Born: 13 October 1943 (age 83); Belfast, Northern Ireland
- Original team: Altona
- Height: 174 cm (5 ft 9 in)
- Weight: 74 kg (163 lb)

Playing career^{1}
Years	Club	Games (Goals)
1962–1968	South Melbourne	84 (72)
1968–1975	Footscray	132 (77)
Total		216 (149)
- ^{1} Playing statistics correct to the end of 1975.

Stuart Michael Magee (born 13 October 1943, in Northern Ireland) is a former Australian rules footballer who played with South Melbourne and Footscray in the Victorian Football League (VFL).

Magee, who played as a centreman and rover, made his debut for South Melbourne in 1962. By 1966 he was representing Victoria at interstate football but soon after he was let go by South Melbourne. He was signed up by Footscray and became captain of the club during the 1970 season after the retirement of Ted Whitten. In 1976 he moved to the West Australian National Football League (WANFL) and joined the Swan Districts as captain-coach.
