= Robert Saggers =

Australian rules footballer

Personal information
- Born: 5 August 1965 (age 61)
- Original team: Altona City
- Height: 185 cm (6 ft 1 in)
- Weight: 78 kg (172 lb)

Playing career^{1}
Years	Club	Games (Goals)
1985	Sydney Swans	2 (2)
1986	North Melbourne	3 (5)
Total		5 (7)
- ^{1} Playing statistics correct to the end of 1986.

Robert Saggers (born 5 August 1965) is a former Australian rules footballer who played with the Sydney Swans and North Melbourne in the Victorian Football League (VFL).

Saggers, an Altona City recruit, made two appearances for Sydney late in the 1985 VFL season. A forward, he transferred to North Melbourne in 1986 and played three games for the club that year.
