= Altona Football Club =

Australian rules football club in Altona, Melbourne

Altona

Names
- Full name: Altona Football Club
- Nickname: Vikings

Club details
- Founded: 1918; 108 years ago
- Colours
- Competition: Western Football Netball League (s. 1988)
- Owners: Members
- President: Jared Moore
- Coach: Rodney Van Riet
- Premierships: 1947, 1951, 1991, 2004, 2005, 2012, 2022
- Ground: Grant Reserve, Altona

Uniforms
Home

Other information
- Official website: altonafc.com.au

The Altona Football Club is an Australian rules football club which competed in the WRFL since 1988. The team is based in the Melbourne suburb of Altona.

== History ==
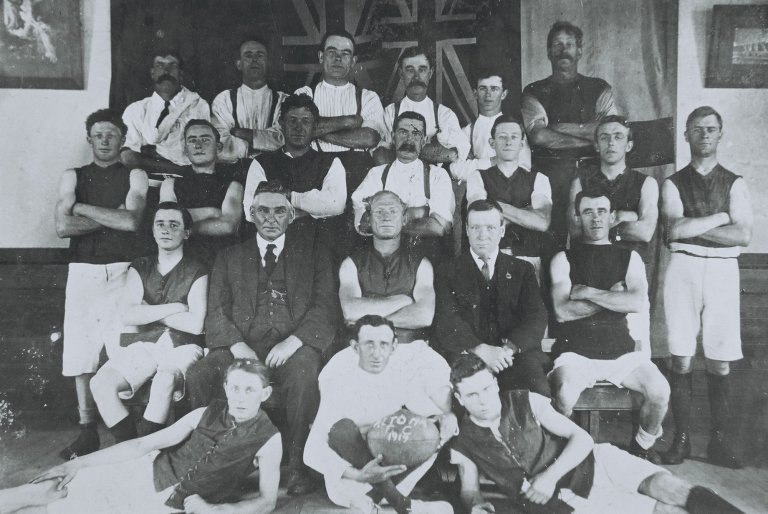
An Altona FC team of 1919.

Altona Football Club was established in 1918 in a Pier Street café by James Duke. Altona's nickname in the 1930s was “The Seagulls” or "The Seadogs". In 1939 Altona changed their Guernseys to Navy Blue with a white "A" on the breast and were known as "The As" In 1940 Altona struggled to keep a team going due to many players joining the Armed Forces. With 2 games to complete the 1940 W.D.F.L. season, Altona were expelled from the Association due to not fielding a team on 2 occasions. Altona would go into recess from 1941 to 1943. In 1944 a group met at Leo Barnes' shop in Pier Street Altona and formed a committee to resume the football club which would play social matches in 1944. In 1945 Altona entered the Footscray District Football League in B-Grade where they won the 1947 Premiership and were elevated into the A-Grade for seasons 1948 and 1949.

In 1950 Altona did not field a Senior team due to the Werribee Shire unwilling to supply a satisfactory playing area, Altona only ran an Under 18 team in C-Grade of the F.D.F.L.

In 1951 with a new playing area Altona rejoined the B-Grade of the F.D.F.L. where they won the Premiership Flag.

In 1952 the F.D.F.L. made it mandatory that there would only be 1 Senior Grade and that all teams must have an Under 18 side. Altona could not raise an Under 18 side so it joined the Werribee Football League and changed its Guernseys back to purple & gold. Altona played in the W.F.L. from 1952 to 1964 and were finalists every year and winning the 1956 & 1964 Premierships.

In 1965 Altona had 2 Senior sides and Juniors. Due to the W.F.L. only having one Senior Division, Altona joined the strong Metropolitan Football League with 1 Senior side and had its Reserves and Juniors in the Werribee Football League. Altona's Reserves would move to the 2nd Division of the Metro Football League in 1966 and the Juniors played in the Western Suburban Football League which had changed its name from the Werribee Football League on the request of the South Melbourne Football Club whom was sponsoring the League.

In early 1969, Altona Football Club Committee released a statement that due to lack of support and poor finances Altona would not field a Senior side and only field Juniors in the W.S.F.L. Former Altona Shire President, Bill Lee had registered the name "Altona City Football Club" with the W.S.F.L. and this would be the start of a new club which would have all the A.F.C. players, same colours and same ground. In 1972 Altona City adopted the nickname "The Vikings" and penned the theme song which would pay homage to the Altona Football Club with the ending chorus of "C'mon the As". This era would be Altona's most successful winning Senior Premierships in 1970, 71, 72, 73, 75 &76.

In 1977 Altona City FC joined the FDFL for 3 seasons.

Altona rejoined the WSFL in 1980 winning the Division 2 flag and the 1987 Premiership. Altona City played in the WSFL until 1988 when the WSFL merged with the FDFL. In 1991 Altona City won the F.D.F.L. A2 Division Premiership which elevated them to the A1 Division in 1992.

At Altona's AGM at the end of 1992, it was voted that Altona City would be named Altona Football Club and all records from both clubs be amalgamated. Altona played in the A1 Division until they were relegated back to the A2 Division after the 2003 season. 2004 saw Altona win the A2 Premiership. Instead of taking the elevation into the A1 Division, the club believed they were not ready to play in the A1 Division and decided to stay in the A2 Division in 2005 where they won back to back Premierships and were elevated into A1 Division for season 2006. The club rebuilt itself from 2006 and saw some lean years but it paid dividends were Altona won the 2012 A1 Division Premiership.

== Team Of The Century 1918 - 2018 ==
Back pocket	Full back	Back pocket	
Danny Brennan	Bernie Brennan	Ian McLeod	
Half back	Centre half back	Half back flank	
Bill "Scud: Thompson -VC	Frank Nielson	Ian Harris	
Wing	Centre	Wing	
John Rohleder	Mal Tisdale	Greg Cunninghan	
Half forward	Centre half Forward	Half forward	
Steve Sheils	Steve Mandics	Wayne Muschialli	
Forward pocket	Full forward	Forward pocket	
Andrew Venner	Ron Schwabe	Bill Devereaux	
Ruck	Ruck rover	Rover	
Gordon Timmins	Martin Crump	Noel Rohleder-Capt	
Interchange
Vic Pateras	Geoff Bebend	Kevin Rohleder	Peter Mildenhall
Coach	Assistant Coach		
Mal Tisdale	Lou Thompson		

== Competitions ==
=== Y.M.C.A ===
1921 , 1924, 1925, 1927, 1928 (5 Seasons)

=== Sunshine & District Football Association ===
1922, 1923 (2 Seasons)

=== Melbourne & Suburbs A-Grade ===
1926 (1 Season)

=== V.F.A. Suburban District B Section ===
1929 (1 Season)

=== Footscray District Football League / Western Region Football League ===
1933, 34, 35, 36, 37, 45, 46, 47, 48, 49, 51, 77, 78, 79, 1988–present (45 Seasons)

=== Werribee District Football Association / Werribee Football League ===
1930,, 31, 32, 38, 39, 40, 52, 53, 54, 55, 56, 57, 58, 59, 60, 61, 62, 63, 64 (19 Seasons)

=== Metropolitan Football League ===
1965, 66, 67, 68 (4 Seasons)

=== Western Suburban Football League ===
1969, 70, 71, 72, 73, 74, 75, 76, 80, 81, 82, 83, 84, 85, 86, 87 (16 Seasons)

== Premierships Seniors ==
- W.D.F.L. = 1930, 1932
- W.F.L. = 1956, 1964
- F.D.F.L. & W.R.F.L. = Div 1 = 2012, 2022 Div 2 = 1947, 1951, 1991, 2004, 2005
- W.S.F.L. = 1970, 1971, 1972, 1973, 1975, 1976, 1980, 1987

== Premierships Reserves ==
- W.S.F.L. 1972, 1974
- W.R.F.L. Div 2 = 2005, Div 1 = 2012, 2013, 2018, 2019

== Premierships U19s ==
- W.R.F.L. 2017, 2018

== Premierships U18s ==
- W.F.L. 1960, 1961, 1964
- W.S.F.L. 1966, 1967, 1968, 1970, 1971, 1984
- W.R.F.L. 2007 Div: 1, 2007 Div: 2

== Premierships U16s ==
- W.S.F.L. 1968, 1969, 1970, 1971

== Premierships U13s ==
- W.S.F.L. 1973, 1977

== Senior Grand Final Results ==
Year	Team	Score		Team	Score	League
1925	Abbotsford	12:8:80	Defeated	Altona	11:5:71	Y.M.C.A. Open Age
1930	Altona	10:11:71	Defeated	Truganina	9:6:60	W.D.F.L.
1932	Altona	12:10:82	Defeated	Laverton	4:13:37	W.D.F.L.
1947	Altona	12:25:97	Defeated	Waratah	4:5:29	F.D.F.L. B Grade
1951	Altona	12:12:84	Defeated	Kingsville	11:7:73	F.D.F.L. B Grade
1956	Altona	9:13:67	Drew	Werribee INF	10:7:67	W.F.L.
1956	Altona	8:7:55	Defeated	Werribee INF	5:7:37	W.F.L.
1957	Werribee South		Defeated	Altona		W.F.L.
1958	Werribee INF	12:17:89	Defeated	Altona	6:13:49	W.F.L.
1959	Werribee South	6:11:47	Defeated	Altona	3:8:26	W.F.L.
1963	Werribee South	10:13:73	Defeated	Altona	9:9:63	W.F.L.
1964	Altona	5:13:43	Defeated	Werribee South	5:4:34	W.F.L.
1970	Altona City	17:14:116	Defeated	Central Altona	14:10:94	W.S.F.L.
1971	Altona City	13:9:87	Defeated	West Newport	11:13:79	W.S.F.L.
1972	Altona City	16:8:104	Defeated	Newport	2:11:23	W.S.F.L.
1973	Altona City	14:20:104	Defeated	Newport	8:12:60	W.S.F.L.
1975	Altona City	20:13:133	Defeated	Central Altona	10:13:73	W.S.F.L.
1976	Altona City	25:9:159	Defeated	Brooklyn	14:13:97	W.S.F.L.
1980	Altona City	18:11:119	Defeated	Laverton	11:9:75	W.S.F.L. 2nd Div
1983	Werribee Centrals	25:13:163	Defeated	Altona City	10:7:67	W.S.F.L.
1984	West Newport	12:12:84	Defeated	Altona City	7:9:51	W.S.F.L.
1987	Altona City	18:10:118	Defeated	Hoppers Crossing	15:9:99	W.S.F.L.
1991	Altona City	10:14:74	Defeated	Sunshine Heights	7:13:55	F.D.F.L. A2 Div
2004	Altona	11:14:80	Defeated	Deer Park	8:7:55	W.R.F.L. A2 Div
2005	Altona	19:12:126	Defeated	Glenorden	8:9:57	W.R.F.L. A2 Div
2012	Altona	14:7:91	Defeated	Spotswood	12:18:90	W.R.F.L. A1 Div
2019	Altona	9:10:64	Defeated By	Deer Park	9:13:67	W.R.F.L. A1 Div
2022	Altona	10:21:81	Defeated	Werribee Districts	9:4:58	W.R.F.L A1 Div

== VFL/AFL players ==
- Charles McDonald - South Melbourne 1924 - 1928 57 Games 5 goals
- Bill Brown - Hawthorn 1926 & 1928 12 Games
- Kevin Rohleder - St.Kilda 1943 5 Games
- Noel Rohleder - South Melbourne 1950 1 Game 1 goal
- Tom Jones - Carlton 1951 - 1952 and Footscray 1953 - 1954 20 Games 10 goals
- Stuart Magee - South Melbourne 1962 - 1968 and Footscray 1968 - 1975 216 Games 149 goals
- Geoff Heyme - South Melbourne 1962 - 1963 10 Games
- Graham Page - South Melbourne 1969 1 Game
- Robert Saggers - Sydney & North Melbourne 1985 - 1986 5 Games 7 goals
- Jayden Post - Richmond 2009 - 2012 30 Games 6 goals
- Saad El-Hawli - Essendon 2025

== Altona Juniors Football Club ==
- Trent McKenzie - Gold Coast Suns 2011 - 2017, Port Adelaide 2018 - 2024
- Emerson Jeka - Hawthorn 2020 - 2023, Geelong - 2024

== ALTONA Senior Best & Fairest ==
 MOST BEST & FAIRESTS  
 5 Noel Rohleder 51, 59, 61, 62, 64  5 Steve Mandics 75, 79, 80, 82, 85  5 Greg Cunningham 87, 89, 93, 94, 96  4 Andrew Venner 97, 98, 99, 01  4 Aaron Freeland  05, 07, 08, 09  3 Mal Tisdale  67, 71, 74   3 Steven Kennedy 13, 17, 19

1919 Abe Johnson & J.Chandler
1931 Ben Wohlers
1938 Kevin Rohleder
1945 Bernie Brennan 
1946 Ron Douglas 
1947 W."Scud" Thompson
1949 Chris Birkitt
1951 Noel Rohleder
1952 Kevin Ridge
1953 Bob Blokeerus
1955 Max Stephens *Max Stephens League B&F 
1958 Wilfred Haigh
1959 Noel Rohleder
1961 Noel Rohleder
1962 Noel Rohleder *Noel Rohleder League B&F
1963 Mario Piovesan *Mario Povesan League B&F
1964 Noel Rohleder & Bill Devereaux
1965 Bill Devereaux
1966
1967 Mal Tisdale
1968 Algie Vosilitis * Algie Vosilitis League B&F
1969 Graham Brennan
1970 Stephen Chatfield
1971 Mal Tisdale
1972 Martin Crump
1973 Gary Munro *Ron Schwabe League B&F
1974 Mal Tisdale
1975 Steve Mandics
1976 Danny Brennan
1977 Geoff Bebend 
1978 Peter Robertson
1979 Steve Mandics
1980 Steve Mandics *Steve Mandics League B&F
1981 Peter Greenough
1982 Steve Mandics
1983 Murray Cooper *Murry Cooper League B&F
1984 Bradley Scholes
1985 Steve Mandics
1986 Colin Ritchie
1987 Greg Cunningham
1988 Shane Davis
1989 Greg Cunningham
1990 Darren Hyde
1991 Paul Whybrow
1992 David Wright
1993 Greg Cunningham
1994 Greg Cunningham
1995 Wayne Muschialli & Scott Evans
1996 Greg Cunninham
1997 Andrew Venner
1998 Andrew Venner *Andrew Venner League B&F
1999 Andrew Venner *Andrew Venner League B&F
2000 Scott Evans 
2001 Andrew Venner *Andrew Venner R/up League B&F
2002 J.Dorward
2003 A.McMahon
2004 S.Smith
2005 Aaron Freeland & Brett Miller
2006 J.Magnabosco
2007 Aaron Freeland
2008 Aaron Freeland & Brett Shiels
2009 Aaron Freeland
2010 Lee Spiteri
2011 Reece Miles
2012 Travis Lunardi
2013 Steven Kennedy
2014 Daniel O'Leary
2015 Jayden Post     
2016 Jordan Robbins
2017 Steven Kennedy *Steven Kennedy League B&F
2018 Patrick Rose
2019 Steven Kennedy
2021 Luke Whatman
2022 Joshua Bench  *Joshua Bench 3rd League B&f
2023 Joshua Bench
2024 Cooper Atchinson
2025 Colby Redpath

== ALTONA Reserves Best & Fairest ==
MOST BEST & FAIRESTS
5 - Anthony Hodgetts 2001, 03, 04, 05, 06  5 - Brett Miller 2012, 13, 14, 15, 16  3 - Darren Hyde 86, 97, 2002  3 - Steve Shiels 91, 92, 94  3 - Glenn Evans 98, 99, 2000

1965 Ern Gillert
1966 Lou Thompson
1967 Kevin Peachey
1968 John Neal
1972 Bill Devereaux *Bill Devereaux League B&F
1974 Geoff Bebend
1976 Steve Grainger
1977 Mick Howard
1978 Gary Nolan
1986 Darren Hyde
1990 Paul Nuske
1991 Steve Shiels
1992 Steve Shiels
1993
1994 Steve Shiels
1995 Robert Grierson
1996 Greg Cooney
1997 Darren Hyde
1998 Glenn Evans 
1999 Glenn Evans  *Glenn Evans League B&f
2000 Glenn Evans 
2001 Anthony Hodgetts  *Glenn Evans League B&f *Anthony Hodgetts R/up League b&f
2002 Darren Hyde 
2003 Anthony Hodgetts
2004 Anthony Hodgetts 
2005 Anthony Hodgetts  *Anthony Hodgetts League B&f
2006 Anthony Hodgetts  *Anthony Hodgetts R/up League B&f 
2007 Kevin McDonald    *Anthony Hodgetts R/up League B&f
2008 Kevin McDonald 
2009 Shaun Hagger
2010 Allan Casser  *Anthony Hodgetts League B&f  
2011 Allan Casser 
2012 Brett Miller  *Brett Miller League b&f 
2013 Brett Miller  *Brett Miller League B&f
2014 Brett Miller  *Brett Miller League B&f *Bilal Souki R/up League B&f 
2015 Brett Miller  *Brett Miller League B&f
2016 Brett Miller  *Brett Miller League B&f
2017 Jordan Allen
2018
2019 Matthew McCartney
2021 William Ward
2022 Matthew McCartney
2023 Ben Tipper *William Naismith R/up League B&f
2024 Michael Spohn +James Mead
2025 Tahu Roordink

== League Best & Fairest ==
=== Seniors ===
1955 – Max Stephens. 1962 – Noel Rohleder. 1963 – Mario Piovesan. 1968 – Algie Vosilaitis. 1973 – Ron Schwabe. 1980 – Steve Mandics. 1983 – Murray Cooper. 1998 & 1999 – Andrew Venner. 2017 -Steven Kennedy.

=== Reserves ===
1972 – Bill Devereaux. 1999 – Glenn Evans. 2001 – Glenn Evans. 2005 – Anthony Hodgetts. 2010 – Anthony Hodgetts. 2012, 2013, 2014, 2015, 2016 – Brett Miller.

=== Under 19s ===
2018 – J.Callaway & B.Searle.

=== Under 18s ===
1960 – Brian Skinner. 1970 – Steve Chatfield. 1971 – E.Valente 1999 – R.Cassidy. 2007 – M.Hardiman. 2008 – Corey Lawson. 2009 – Alex Vivoda. 2017 Ethan Taylor

=== Under 17s ===
1978 – Neil Condon.

=== Under 16s ===
1966 – Richard Zapart. 1968 – Steve Chatfield. 1971 – Joc O'Conner.

=== Under 12s ===
1977 – Doug Cooper. 1983 – Jason Skinner.

=== Under 10s ===
1977 – Andrew Taylor.

== Book ==
- History of the WRFL/FDFL – Kevin Hillier - - ISBN 9781863356015
- History of football in Melbourne's north west - John Stoward - ISBN 9780980592924
