= Roleder =

Roleder is a German surname. Notable people with the surname include:

- Cindy Roleder (born 1989), German hurdler
- Helmut Roleder (born 1953), German football goalkeeper

== See also ==
- Rohleder
- Roeder
