= Rob Astbury =

Australian radio & TV sports journalist

Rob Astbury (1948 – 9 November 2017) was an Australian radio and television sports journalist and real estate agent.

== Biography ==
Astbury was born in Avoca, Victoria. Asbury played senior football for the Avoca Football Club and won the 1971 Lexton FL goalkicking award and played with Avoca in their 1971 and 1972 losing Lexton FL grand final teams.

During a media career spanning 21 years, he won ten VFL/AFL awards, two national Penguin Awards and was twice nominated for the Logie Awards for the Best News Story of the year. After an early career in Melbourne radio, Astbury made a successful jump to television—firstly for the Channel 0/10 network, then for the Nine Network, after accepting a personal job offer from owner Kerry Packer. During his television career, Astbury was Australia's highest-paid sports correspondent.

In 2005, Astbury revealed he was HIV positive, although medical tests showed he was a rare long-term nonprogressor (or "elite controller"), whose body can suppress the virus for a long period without antiretroviral drugs. In 2006, celebrity agent Anthony Zammit published King and I: My Life With Graham Kennedy, a biography that detailed Astbury's relationship with entertainer Graham Kennedy.

After retiring from television, Astbury worked as a real estate agent at Broadbeach on the Gold Coast, Queensland, between 1995 and 2000. For the next decade, he ran a property development company in Thailand. During the 2004 Boxing Day tsunami while Astbury was holidaying in Phuket, he reported on the devastation for the political website Crikey. Returning to the Gold Coast in 2010, Astbury worked with the Ray White Real Estate agency in Broadbeach. On 9 November 2017, a colleague found him dead in his home after he did not turn up to work and could not be contacted.

Astbury left a second biography unpublished. At the time of his death Astbury was making plans with fellow journalist Jon Lindsay to travel back to Pattaya in Thailand to set up a new real estate agency aimed at the ex-pat retirement market.
