= Charles McDonald (footballer) =

Australian rules footballer

Personal information
- Full name: Charles John McDonald
- Born: 14 June 1901; Eaglehawk, Victoria
- Died: 28 September 1978 (aged 77); Altona, Victoria
- Original teams: Altona, Leopold
- Height: 182 cm (6 ft 0 in)
- Weight: 76 kg (168 lb)

Playing career^{1}
Years	Club	Games (Goals)
1924–28	South Melbourne	57 (5)
- ^{1} Playing statistics correct to the end of 1928.

Charles John McDonald (14 June 1901 – 28 September 1978) was an Australian rules footballer who played with South Melbourne in the Victorian Football League (VFL).

McDonald later served in the Australian Army for three years during World War II.
