= Tom Jones (footballer, born 1930) =

Australian rules footballer (1930–2018)

Personal information
- Full name: Thomas Maxwell Jones
- Born: 10 July 1930
- Died: 20 April 2018 (aged 87)
- Original team: Altona
- Height: 191 cm (6 ft 3 in)
- Weight: 89 kg (196 lb)

Playing career^{1}
Years	Club	Games (Goals)
1951–52	Carlton	7 (4)
1953–54	Footscray	13 (6)
Total		20 (10)
- ^{1} Playing statistics correct to the end of 1954.

Thomas Maxwell Jones (10 July 1930 – 20 April 2018) is a former Australian rules footballer who played with Carlton and Footscray in the Victorian Football League (VFL).
