= Hg (equity firm) =

British private equity firm

- Type: Private limited company
- Industry: Private equity
- Predecessor: Mercury Private Equity
- Founded: 2000; 26 years ago
- Founders: Partnership
- Headquarters: London
- Products: Private equity funds, leveraged buyout
- Total assets: US$100 billion (2025)
- Website: www.hgcapital.com

Hg is a London, England-based private equity firm targeting technology buyouts primarily in Europe and the US. The company focuses on investments in technology and services sectors. Hg was founded in 2000.

== History ==
Hg began life as Mercury Private Equity, the private equity arm of Mercury Asset Management plc, a long-established UK-based asset management firm. Mercury Asset Management was acquired by Merrill Lynch in 1997. In December 2000, the executives of Mercury Private Equity negotiated independence from Merrill Lynch, and HgCapital (as it was then known) was established as a fully independent partnership wholly owned by its Partners and employees, who together work with a common purpose and culture.

In February 2017, the company raised its 8th £2.5 billion core fund and its 2nd £575 million Mercury fund, targeting smaller technology buyouts. Both funds were closed on their hard-caps and were more than 3x oversubscribed versus their targets, receiving strong re-ups from existing investors. The company raised its 1st time £1.5B Saturn large-cap fund in March 2018 and in 2020 raised $11B across three funds, Mercury 3, Genesis 9 and Saturn 2.

In 2021, Hg secured a majority investment in Serrala, a German provider of financial-automation and payments software.

In 2022, the company raised $11 billion for its largest fund, Saturn 3. In 2023, the firm reached the €6.75 billion hard-cap for mid-market fund Genesis 10 and held a final close on Hg Mercury 4 at over €2.4 billion.

In June 2024, Hg ranked 10th in Private Equity International's PEI 300 ranking among the world's largest private equity firms. In 2024 Hg Wealth raised €500m from its friends and family network into its fund. Later in the year, Hg Wealth signed a partnership with UBS. In the same year, Hg acquired audit, risk and ESG software firm Auditboard for over $3bn, as well as Focus Group, a UK-based business technology provider.

In October 2025, Hg sold GTreasury, a treasury management software company it had backed since 2023, to Ripple Labs for approximately US$1 billion. The platform was subsequently relaunched as Ripple Treasury.

== Business ==
The company has close to 400 employees in investment offices in London, UK, Munich, Germany, San Francisco, Singapore, and New York, NY, and serves over 100 institutional investors, including private and public pension funds, endowments, insurance companies and fund of funds. As of 2025, Hg has over $75 billion in funds under management and invests on behalf of Limited Partner clients.

=== Investments ===
Hg is invested in more than 50 companies across Europe and the US, and has invested in over 120 Software & Services businesses. One of its most prominent investments is Visma, a Scandinavian software business. In August 2020 Hg led the $12.2B buyout of Visma, Europe's largest software buyout to date. In 2022, Hg Capital purchased Ideagen PLC, a UK GRC company, for £1 bn.

In January 2026, Hg announced it would acquire financial software company OneStream for ~$6.4 billion. The deal was expected to close in 1H 2026.
