= List of former Australian rules football competitions in Victoria =

This is a list of former Australian Rules Football competitions in the Australian state of Victoria.

== Metropolitan competitions ==
Name	Founded	Ended	Reason	Previous Names	Known clubs
Band of Hope Football Association	1926	1931			
Berwick Football Assocication	1910	1932	Most clubs moved to the Dandenong District FL		Beaconsfield, Berwick, Clayton, Cranbourne, Dandenong, Glen Waverley, Mulgrave, Noble Park, Springvale.
Bourke-Evelyn Football League	1906	1931			Arthurs Creek, Donnybrook, Epping, Kinglake, Mernda, Midland Rovers, Reservoir, South Morang, Whittlesea
Brunswick & Coburg Churches Association	1927	1932			Coburg Methodists, East Brunswick Methodists, West Brunswick Methodists, Moreland C of C, Brunswick C of C, Coburg Presbyterians, Brunswick Presbyterians, St Augustines, Union Street Methodists.
Caulfield Oakleigh Football League	1932	1962	Formed as a feeder competition for players to progress to the Oakleigh (VFA) side. Merged with the Eastern Suburban Football League to form the South East Suburban Football League.		
Croydon Ferntree Gully Football League	1950	1961	Changed its name to the Eastern Districts Football League		
CYMS Football Association	1910s	1976			
Dandenong Districts Football League	1933	1953	Most clubs move to the newly formed South West Gippsland FL in 1954		Beaconsfield, Berwick, Clayton, Cranbourne, Dandenong, Ferntree Gully, Keysborough, Mulgrave, Noble Park, Rythedale-Officer, Springvale, Tooradin-Dalmore.
East Suburban Football League	1932	1962	Merged with the Caulfield Oakleigh Football League to form the South East Suburban Football League.		
Eastern Suburban Churches Football Association	1925	1992	Absorbed by the Southern Football League	Eastern Suburban Protestant Churches Association 1925-1969	
Federal Football League	1909	1981	Absorbed by the South East Suburban FL		
Keilor & Broadmeadows Football League	1926	1931			
Melbourne District Football Association	1906	1924	Forerunner of the VFL Sub Districts		
Melbourne North Football League	1989	1994	Set up for clubs that the Diamond Valley refused to admit.		Bellfield, Heidelberg Colts, Keon Park, Northcote Dragons. Northern Dragons, Reservoir Rovers
Methodist Football League	1946	1955			Hampton Methodist fc 1947-1951
Metropolitan Football League	1950	1974		Sub District Football League (1925–49)	Altona, Deer Park, East Brunswick, East Hawthorn, Fairfield, Hawthorn City, Northcote Park, Reservoir, Richmond District, St Albans, St Kilda City, South Melbourne District, Sunshine
Metropolitan Protestant Churches Football League	1957	1971			
Mountain District Football Association	1911	1965	Existed 1911–1924, reformed 1931–1935, known as Belgrave Football League in 1936, 1945–1965. Merged with Yarra Valley Football League in 1966 to form Yarra Valley & Mountain District Football League		Monbulk, Belgrave, Ferny Creek (1911-1932), Olinda (1911-1914 + 1933–1938), Olinda-Ferny Creek (1946-1964), Macclesfield, Emerald, Gembrook, Silvan, Boronia, Ferntree Gully, Upwey-Tecoma, Upper Ferntree Gully, South Belgrave, South Wantirna, Mt. Evelyn, Lilydale Imperial (1931–32), Kilsyth (1936)
Northern Metropolitan Football League	1975	1979			Batman (now Coburg Districts), Bellfield, Broadmeadows, Collingwood Districts, Dallas Blues, East Brunswick, Fitzroy Stars, Jacana, Merlynston, Preston Wanderers, Princes Hill, RMIT, St Andrews, West Brunswick
Panton Hill Football League	1931	1987			Donnybrook, Hurstbridge, Kinglake, Lalor, Latrobe University, Mernda, Panton Hill, Research, St Andrews, Watsonia, Whittlesea
Protestant Football Association	1921	1940			
Reporter District Football Association	1903	1928	Disbanded early 1927 after inner clubs joined the V.F.L. Sub-Districts and the outer clubs formed the Ringwood District Football League		Box Hill, Mitcham, Canterbury, Ringwood Imperials (1903), Ringwood, Bayswater, Ferntree Gully, Burwood, East Burwood, Camberwell, Warrandyte, Nunawading, Blackburn, Doncaster, Croydon, Rose Of Camberwell (1909), Surrey Hills, Deepdene, Kilsyth, Kew, Vermont, Auburn, Balwyn
Ringwood District Football League	1927	1941			Ringwood, Blackburn, Doncaster, Warrandyte, Croydon, Kilsyth, Vermont, Mitcham, Templestowe, Tunstall All Blacks, Ringwood East, Olinda-Monbulk (1939), Bayswater, Boronia, Lilydale Stars
Saturday Morning Football League	1927	1960		Industrial FL	Postal, Wirra Stars, MacRobertson's, Victoria Brewery, Havelock, Carlton Brewery, Abbotsford Brewery, Raymonds, G.M.H., Commonwealth Services, Electronic, Explosive, Kodak, Repatriation, S.E.C., Yellow Cabs
Scoresby District Football League	1925	1930	League created to replace Mountain DFA which went into recess. When MDFA resumed in 1931 most clubs transferred in.		Bayswater-Boronia, Ferntree Gully, East Burwood, Ferny Creek, Belgrave, Scoresby, Monbulk, Silvan
Sunday Amateur Football League	1947	1964			
Sunday Suburban Football League	1950	1968		Melbourne Amateur Sunday Football Association (1950–67)	
VFA Sub District Football Association	1927	1953			Altona, North Williamstown, Port United, North Port Melbourne, East Preston, Victoria Park, Montague, St. Andrews, Yarraville Districts, South Elsternwick,
VFL Sub-Districts	1925	1949	Revamped into Metropolitan FL (1950-1974)		
Victorian Junior Football Association	1883	1932			
West Suburban Football League	1919	1987	Absorbed by the Footscray District Football League	Werribee District Football League (1919–64)	Altona, INF, Lara, Laverton, Little River, Metro Farm, Newport, Services, Werribee, Werribee South, Williamstown Rovers, Wyndham
YCW National Football League	1963	1986	Broke away from the C.Y.M.S. association because most junior clubs didn't have a senior pathway forward.		ACSC, Bellfield, Broadmeadows, Clifton Hill, Coburg YCW, East Brunswick, East Preston, East Thomastown, Fitzroy Stars, Fairfield, Flemington, Jacana, Kensington Stores, Keon Park, Merlynston, Moomba Park, Moorabbin West, North Fawkner, North Melbourne and District YCW, RAAF Melbourne, RAAF Squadron, Reservoir Rovers, Richmond Centrals (unrelated to current Richmond Central) St Andrews, South Dandenong, West Ivanhoe

== Country competitions ==
- Alberton Football League (1946-2019)
- Ararat & District Football Association (1928–1999)
  - Clubs included Caledonians, Halls Gap, St Marys, Prestige, Trinity, Great Western, Moyston, Glenorchy, Swifts, Warriors, Miners
- Bacchus Marsh Football League (1912–1973)
  - Merged with Ballarat District Football League to form the Ballarat and Bacchus Marsh Football League.
- Bairnsdale District Football League (1948–1972)
  - Merged with Gippsland Football League to form the East Gippsland Football League
- Bairnsdale Bruthen District Football League (1928–1953)
- Ballarat District Football League (1959–1973)
  - Merged with Bacchus Marsh Football League to form the Ballarat and Bacchus Marsh Football League.
- Ballarat and Bacchus Marsh Football League (1974–1978)
  - Merged with Clunes Football League to form the Central Highlands Football League.
- Bass Valley Football League (1922), (1946–1954)
- Bass Valley Wonthaggi Football League (1955–1995)
- Benalla & District Football League
- Bright and Myrtleford District Football Association (1936-1951)
- Bright District Football Association (1901-1935)
- Castlemaine Football Association (1894-1951)
- Central Gippsland Football League (1902–1953)
- Central Glenelg Football League (1934–1959)
- Central Goulburn Football League (1998-2005)
- Central Wimmera (1922–1968)
  - Clubs included Natimuk, Noradjuha, Horsham seconds, Pimpinio, Quantong,
- Clunes Football League (1931–1978)
  - Merged with Ballarat and Bacchus Marsh Football League to form the Central Highlands Football League.
- Corangamite Football League (1925–1934)
- Cowwarr Football League (1909–1954)
  - Merged with Sale District Football League to form the North Gippsland Football League.
- East Gippsland Football League (1920–1939)
- Echuca Football League (1952–1989)
  - Merged with the Northern Districts Football League to form the Northern & Echuca Football League. Clubs included Echuca East, Echuca South, Bawamn, Lockington, Moama, Bunnaloo
- Euroa District Football Association (1903-1949)
- Gippsland Football League (1901–1973)
  - Merged with Bairnsdale District Football League to form the East Gippsland Football League
- Glenelg & District Football Assoc (1945–1959)
- Glenelg Football League (1960–1969)
- Golden City Football League (1960–1980)
- Grantville District Football Association
- Great Southern Football Association (1902-?)
- Heytesbury Football League (1980–1991)
  - Merged with the Mount Noorat Football League to form the Heytesbury Mount Noorat Football League
- Heytesbury Mount Noorat Football League (1992-2002)
- Hume Highway Football League (1931–54)
- Korong Football League (1908–1949)
- Kowree Naracoorte Football League (1937–1992)
  - Merged with Tatiara Football League to form Kowree Naracoorte Tatiara Football League
- Lexton Football League (1945–1998)
  - Merged with Western Plains Football League to form the Lexton Plains Football League
- Linton Carngham Football League (1936–1952)
  - Clubs included Berringa, Bradvale, Carngham, Illabarook, Mannibadar, Scarsdale, Skipton, Smythesdale and Vite Vite.
- Lowan Star Football Association (1923–1968)
  - Minor competition in the Nhill district. Clubs included Boyeo, Gerang, Kiata, Lorquon, Netherby, Winiam, and Yanac. Second XVIII's from Nhill, Jeparit and Dimboola competed at different stages.
- Mallee Football Association (1902–1934)
- Mid Murray Football League (1934–1997)
  - Merged with Northern & Echuca Football League to form the Central Murray Football League
- Mountain Creek Football Association (1922-1933)
- Mount Noorat Football League (1932–1991)
  - Merged with the Heytesbury Football League to form the Heytesbury Mount Noorat Football League
- Mudgegonga Football Association (1934)
- Nepean Football League (1959-1986)
  - Hived off by the Mornington Peninsula FL committee only to merge later to form the Mornington Peninsula Nepean Football League.
- Neerim District Football Association (1907–1951)
- Northern Mallee Football League (1979–1996)
  - Merged with Southern Mallee Football League to form the Mallee Football League.
- North East District Association (1895-1912)
  - Forerunner of the Waranga North East Football Association.
- Northern Districts Football League (1953–1989)
- Northern & Echuca Football League (1990–1996)
  - League merged with Mid Murray FL to form Central Murray Football League.
- Otway Football Association (1931–1956)
- Ouyen District Football League (1910–1955)
- Panton Hill Football League (1931–1987)
- Polwarth Football League (1922–1970)
  - Became the Bellarine Football League
- Port Campbell Football League
- Port Fairy Football League (1923–1969)
- Portland District Football League (1955–1969)
- Purnim Football League (1931-1969)
- Purnim Heytesbury Football League (1970-1979)
  - Resultant merge of senior and junior football leagues.
- Riviera Football League (1986–2003)
  - Second division clubs broke away from East Gippsland Football League
- Sale District Football League (1946–1954)
  - Merged with Cowwarr Football League to form the North Gippsland Football League.
- South Gippsland Shire Football Association (1904-21), (1923-32)
- South Gippsland Football League (1933-1952)
- South Gippsland Senior Football League (1954)
  - Leongatha, Korumburra and Mirboo were barred from joining the Latrobe Valley Football League.
  - All towns supplied two teams each for a six team competition.
- South Gippsland Football League (1955-1970)
- South West Gippsland Football League (1954–1994)
- Southern Mallee Football League (1932–1996)
  - Merged with Northern Mallee Football League to form the Mallee Football League.
- Tambo Valley Football Association (1907–1925)
- Tatiara Football League (1911–1992)
  - Merged with Kowree Naracoorte Football League to form Kowree Naracoorte Tatiara Football League
- Tatong & Thoona Football Association (1933-1940)
- Tyrrell Football League (1945–1978)
- Wallacedale District Football League (1935–1954)
- Waranga North East Football Association (1913–1976)
- West Gippsland Football Association (1903 - ?)
- West Gippsland Football League (1927–2001)
- Western District Football League (1923–1963)
  - Merged with SE Border FL to form Western Border Football League
- Western And Moira Football Association (1906-1933)
  - Renamed the Picola & District Football League
- Western Plains Football League (1930–1998)
  - Merged with Lexton Football League to form the Lexton Plains Football League
- Winchelsea Football Association (1896-1921)
  - Forerunner of the Polwarth Football Association. Teams included Birregurra, Deans Marsh, Forrest & Winchelsea.
- Yackandandah & District Football League (1928-1932), (1940) & (1946-1953)
- Yarrawonga District Football Association (1891-1912)
- Yarra Valley Football League (1919-1965)
  - Merged with the Mountain District Football League to form the Yarra Valley Mountain District Football League
