= Western Plains Football League =

- Formerly: Western Plains Football Association, Western Plains FA in recess, Western Plains Football League
- Founded: 1920
- Folded: 1998
- Replaced by: Lexton Plains Football League

The Western Plains Football League was an Australian rules football league based in Victoria.

== History ==
In Jul, 1920, Melbourne played the Western Plains FA in a match at Cressy.

The Western Plains Football Association was reformed in 1930, from the following clubs - Berrybank, Cressy, Derrinallum and Lismore, with precursor league the Lismore District Football Association finishing.

The Western Plains Football League commenced the 1940 season on Saturday 11 May 1940, but at a league meeting in late June it was decided to abandon the season, mainly due to the number of player enlistments into the various Australian Armed Forces due to World War Two.

There is evidence of a Western Plains football competition in 1945, but the full revival of the Western Plains FL took place in April 1946, from the following teams - Cressy, Derrinallum, Iiiabarook, Lismore and Rokewood.

In September 1946, the Geelong Football League: 11.15 - 81 defeated the Western Plains Football League: 8.9 - 57.

The league continued until 1998 when the VCFL forced it to merge with the Lexton Football League to create the Lexton Plains Football League.

All existing clubs joined the Lexton Plains Football League in 1999, with the exception of Derrinallum, who then merged with Lismore and joined the Mininera & District Football League and Cressy who went into recess.

Some notable players from the Western Plains are Carji Greeves, Reg Hickey, Allan Everett, John Northey and Gerard FitzGerald are among 30 VFL / AFL players who commenced their football journey in the Western Plains FL.

== Clubs ==
=== Final Clubs in 1998 ===
Club	Jumper	Nickname	Home Ground	Former League	Est.	Years in WPFL	Premierships		Fate
Club	Jumper	Nickname	Home Ground	Former League	Est.	Years in WPFL	Total	Years	Fate
Carngham Linton		Saints	Carngham Recreation Reserve, Snake Valley	–	1968	1969-1998	12	1974, 1976, 1982, 1983, 1984, 1985, 1987, 1989, 1990, 1995, 1997, 1998	Formed Lexton Plains FL in 1999
Cressy		Demons	Cressy Recreation Reserve, Cressy	CFL	1907	1920, 1930-1998	8	1920, 1949, 1951, 1953, 1959, 1961, 1969, 1970	Moved to Colac District FA in 1921. Folded in 1999
Illabarook	(1940s-60s)(1960s-98)	Bulldogs	Illabarook Recreation Reserve, Illabarook	LCDFA	1891	1937-1998	4	1938, 1946, 1988, 1991	Formed Lexton Plains FL in 1999
Lismore		Lions	Lismore Recreation Reserve, Lismore	LSFA	1880s	1920-1924, 1930–1998	10	1921, 1932, 1933, 1934, 1935, 1948, 1952, 1964, 1973, 1986	Moved to Linton Scarsdale FA in 1925. Renamed Lismore-Derrinallum and moved to Mininera & District FL in 1999
Rokewood-Corindhap		Hoppers	Rokewood Recreation Reserve, Rokewood	LCDFA	1931	1935-1998	9	1947, 1957, 1963, 1967, 1978, 1979, 1992, 1993, 1994	Formed Lexton Plains FL in 1999
Skipton		Emus	Skipton Recreation Reserve, Skipton	LCDFA	1870s	1953-1998	0	-	Formed Lexton Plains FL in 1999

=== Previous clubs ===
Club	Jumper	Nickname	Home Ground	Former League	Est.	Years in WPFL	Premierships		Fate
Club	Jumper	Nickname	Home Ground	Former League	Est.	Years in WPFL	Total	Years	Fate
Beeac		Magpies	Beeac Recreation Reserve, Beeac	CFL, C&DFL	1889	1935-1940, 1950-1951	3	1937, 1939, 1950	Played in Colac & District FL between 1945-49. Moved to Polwarth FL in 1952
Berrybank			Berrybank Recreation Reserve, Berrybank	LDFA		1920-1924, 1930-1936	1	1936	Recess between 1925-29. Folded in 1937
Bradvale		Magpies	Bradvale Recreation Reserve, Bradvale	LCDFA	1925	1949-1982	1	1965	Folded in 1983
Carngham	Light with dark sash		Carngham Recreation Reserve, Snake Valley	LCDFA	1919	1953-1961	0	-	Moved to Ballarat District FL in 1962
Darlington			Darlington Recreation Reserve, Darlington	HDFA	1938	1950-1960	3	1955, 1956, 1958	Folded in 1961
Derrinallum		Tigers	Derrinallum Recreation Reserve, Derrinallum	LSFA	1880s	1920-1924, 1930–1997	9	1930, 1931, 1960, 1971, 1972, 1977, 1980, 1981, 1996	Entered recess in 1925, re-formed in Lismore DFA in 1926. Merged with Mortlake to form Western Lions in Hampden FNL in 1998
Glenormiston College		The College	Glenormiston College, Glenormiston South	MNFL	1971	1992-1993	0	-	Withdrew mid-season in 1993 and subsequently folded
Linton			Linton Recreation Reserve, Linton	LCDFA	1919	1953-1968	1	1962	Merged with Carngham to form Carngham Linton in 1969
Mingay						1920-1924	1	1924	Folded in 1925

== Grand Finals ==
- 1920 – Cressy 5.9 (39) def Lismore 4.10 (34)
- 1921 – Lismore 5.5 (35) def Derrinallum 4.8 (32)
- 1922 – Derrinallum 13.8 (86) def Mingay 3.3 (21)
- 1923 – Berrybank 2.14 (26) def Lismore 3.3 (21)
- 1924 – Mingay 5.3 (33) def Lismore 3.8 (26)
- 1925-1929 – WPFA in recess
- 1930 – Derrinallum-Bradvale 11.10 (76) def Cressy 7.13 (55)
- 1931 – Derrinallum-Bradvale 7.9 (51) def Cressy 4.8 (32)
- 1932 – Lismore 7.15 (57) def Derrinallum-Bradvale 8.6 (54)
- 1933 – Lismore 7.16 (58) def Derrinallum-Bradvale 6.13 (49)
- 1934 – Lismore 8.11 (59) def Cressy 9.2 (56)
- 1935 – Lismore 12.7 (79) def Beeac 7.10 (52)
- 1936 – Berrybank 8.5 (53) def Lismore 4.5 (29)
- 1937 – Beeac 7.8 (50) def Cressy 5.9 (39)
- 1938 – Beeac 9.5 (59) def Illabarook 6.10 (46)
  (Beeac played an ineligible player & Illabarook were declared premiers)
- 1939 – Beeac 10.17 (77) def Derrinallum 10.9 (69)
- 1940 - Season abandoned in June 1940 due to WW2
- 1941 - 1944: WPFL in recess due to WW2
- 1945 - Derrinallum 14.13 (97) def Lismore 8.12 (60)
- 1946 - Illabarook: 9.12 - 66 drew with Rokewood-Corindhap: 8.18 - 66
- 1946 – Illabarook 8.9 (57) def Rokewood-Corindhap 4.7 (31) (Replay)
- 1947 – Rokewood-Corindhap 9.13 (67) def Lismore 9.9 (63)
- 1948 – Lismore 22.12 (144) def Illabarook 6.14 (50)
- 1949 – Cressy 11.7 (73) def Lismore 8.21 (69)
- 1950 – Beeac 10.7 (67) def Rokewood-Corindhap 5.13 (43)
- 1951 – Cressy 11.14 (80) def Beeac 10.11 (71)
- 1952 – Lismore 10.8 (68) def Illabarook 8.15 (63)
- 1953 – Cressy 15.16 (106) def Lismore 8.9 (57)
- 1954 – Lismore 13.17 (95) def Derrinallum 7.15 (57)
- 1955 – Darlington 20.11 (131) def Derrinallum 6.12 (48)
- 1956 – Darlington 13.4 (82) def Rokewood-Corindhap 6.13 (49)
- 1957 – Rokewood-Corindhap 14.8 (92) def Lismore 7.11 (53)
- 1958 – Darlington 13.8 (86) def Linton 9.12 (66)
- 1959 – Cressy 10.8 (68) def Derrinallum 8.18 (66)
- 1960 – Derrinallum 10.10 (70) def Cressy 7.12 (54)
- 1961 – Cressy 8.9 (57) def Derrinallum 5.16 (46)
- 1962 – Linton 13.7 (85) def Derrinallum 8.10 (58)
- 1963 – Rokewood-Corindhap 18.9 (117) def Cressy 11.13 (79)
- 1964 – Lismore 11.12 (78) def Cressy 9.4 (58)
- 1965 – Bradvale 14.14 (98) def Derrinallum 7.6 (48)
- 1966 – Cressy 15.10 (100) def Rokewood-Corindhap 4.12 (36)
- 1967 – Rokewood-Corindhap 14.14 (98) def Derrinallum 14.11 (95)
- 1968 – Derrinallum 9.13 (67) def Cressy 7.15 (57)
- 1969 – Cressy 17.7 (109) def Derrinallum 10.17 (77)
- 1970 – Cressy 17.6 (108) def Lismore 9.11 (65)
- 1971 – Derrinallum 7.11 (53) def Lismore 3.6 (24)
- 1972 – Derrinallum 15.21 (111) def Illabarook 14.8 (92)
- 1973 – Lismore 18.9 (117) def Derrinallum 13.15 (93)
- 1974 – Carngham-Linton 7.4 (46) def Lismore 5.15 (45)
- 1975 – Derrinallum 13.15 (93) def Cressy 10.12 (72)
- 1976 – Carngham-Linton 18.10 (118) def Cressy 9.20 (74)
- 1977 – Derrinallum 11.12 (78) def Carngham-Linton 9.12 (66)
- 1978 – Rokewood-Corindhap 14.19 (103) def Cressy 15.8 (98)
- 1979 – Rokewood-Corindhap 8.12 (60) def Carngham-Linton 7.11 (53)
- 1980 – Derrinallum 14.11 (95) def Carngham-Linton 12.12 (84)
- 1981 – Derrinallum 23.14 (152) def Lismore 10.9 (69)
- 1982 – Carngham-Linton 17.17 (119) def Illabarook 9.14 (68)
- 1983 – Carngham-Linton 15.23 (113) def Lismore 11.12 (78)
- 1984 – Carngham-Linton 25.19 (169) def Derrinallum 16.8 (104)
- 1985 – Carngham-Linton 22.7 (139) def Derrinallum 15.8 (98)
- 1986 – Lismore 14.14 (98) def Carngham-Linton 1.6 (12)
- 1987 – Carngham-Linton 10.22 (82) def Illabarook 9.11 (65)
- 1988 – Illabarook 16.16 (112) def Cressy 9.11 (65)
- 1989 – Carngham-Linton 22.13 (145) def Illabarook 4.10 (34)
- 1990 – Carngham-Linton def Illabarook
- 1991 – Illabarook 14.12 (96) def Carngham-Linton 8.7 (55)
- 1992 – Rokewood-Corindhap 17.10 (112) def Derrinallum 6.6 (42)
- 1993 – Rokewood-Corindhap 17.11 (113) def Carngham-Linton 13.13 (91)
- 1994 – Rokewood-Corindhap 17.14 (116) def Carngham-Linton 13.8 (86)
- 1995 – Carngham-Linton 22.17 (149) def Rokewood-Corindhap 12.8 (80)
- 1996 – Derrinallum 8.10 (58) def Skipton 8.4 (52)
- 1997 – Carngham-Linton 18.11 (119) def Derrinallum 12.9 (81)
- 1998 – Carngham-Linton 17.14 (116) def Rokewood-Corindhap 10.8 (68)

== League Best and Fairest Winners ==
The Western Plains FL best and fairest award was known as the Brunn Trophy / Cup, in honour of former Lismore player Henry Brunn, who at 19 years of age died in a motorcycle accident in April 1948. This award most likely ran from 1948 to 1998, but unable to find a complete list of the winners.

- 1957 - D Hart - ?
- 1963 - Gary Dark - Rokewood
- 1973 - John Fraser - Skipton
- 1977 - Hans Verdoorn - Carngham Linton
- 1979 - Hans Verdoorn - Carngham Linton
- 1985 - Eugene Grigg - Carngham Linton
- 1987 - Eugene Grigg - Carngham Linton
- 1988 - S Blake - Rokewood Corindhap
- 1990 - W Innes - Rokewood Corindhap
- 1998 - Nick McIntosh - Carngham Linton

== Links ==
- Great Plains: The history of football and netball in the Western Plains district. By Michael O'Bernie and Darren Prentice
- 1938 - Western Plains FL Premiers: Illabarook FC team photo
- 1946 - Western Plains FL Premiers: Lismore FC team photo
- 1954 - Western Plains FL Grand Final teams: Lismore FC & Derrinallum FC team photos
- 1957 - Western Plans FL: Henry Brunn Cup photo
- Lexton Plains Football League: 1999 to 2010
- Western Plains FL via Footypedia.info
