= Gary Dark =

Australian rules footballer

Personal information
- Full name: Gary Donald Thomas Dark
- Born: 28 November 1944
- Died: 22 September 1971 (aged 26); Ballarat, Victoria
- Original team: Rokewood
- Height: 187 cm (6 ft 2 in)
- Weight: 86 kg (190 lb)

Playing career^{1}
Years	Club	Games (Goals)
1964, 1966	Footscray	6 (8)
- ^{1} Playing statistics correct to the end of 1966.

Career highlights
- Western Plains FL Brunn Trophy: 1963; Western Plains FL Premiership: 1963

Gary Dark (28 November 1944 – 22 September 1971) was a former Australian rules footballer who played with Footscray in the Victorian Football League (VFL).

Dark won his club best and fairest award in 1963 and also the 1963 Western Plains Football League best and fairest award, the Henry Brunn Trophy whilst playing with Rokewood.
