= Elke Christina Roeder =

German politician

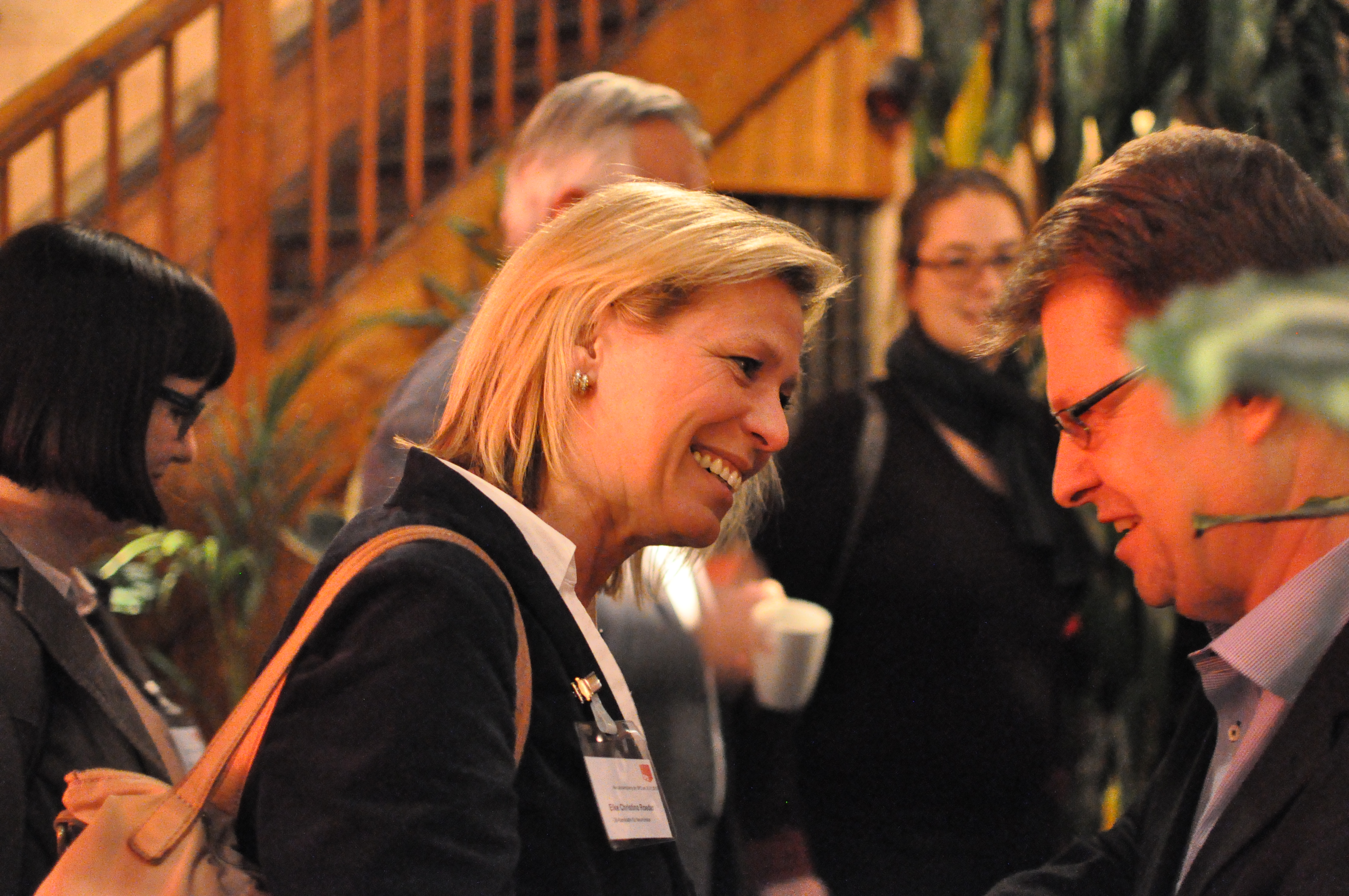
Elke Christina Roeder

Elke Christina Roeder (born November 27, 1966, in Simmern/Hunsrück) is a German politician and a member of the Social Democratic Party of Germany (SPD). From 2018 to 2024 she was Lord Mayor of the city of Norderstedt, which borders Hamburg.

== Life ==
Roeder was born on November 27, 1966, in Simmern/Hunsrück and grew up in Wentorf bei Hamburg. She is a trained jurist and qualified bank clerk. She completed her law studies at the Leibniz University Hannover.

She was mayor of Bad Pyrmont from 2006 to 2014. On October 18, 2011, she joined the SPD. The SPD had already supported her mayoral candidacy in 2006. In addition, she was chairman of the supervisory board of Stadtwerke Bad Pyrmont. After the mayoral election on 25 May 2014, she was succeeded by Klaus Blome (independent) as mayor on 1 November 2014.

Roeder is also a member of the main committee of the Deutscher Städtetag.

On 19 November 2014, Elke Christina Roeder was nominated by the SPD Neumünster as a candidate for mayoral election on 10 May 2015. She lost the election significantly with 34.5% against the non-partisan incumbent Olaf Tauras (59.8%). There was no runoff. She worked in the planning and environmental committee of the city and belonged to the SPD Kreisverband Neumünster as a member of the local association West.

For the election to the German Bundestag 2017, she ran on place 11 of the SPD Schleswig-Holstein state party list, but did not enter the Bundestag.

The SPD selected Roeder as their candidate for the mayoral election in Norderstedt. She succeeded Hans-Joachim Grote, who is now Minister of the Interior of Schleswig-Holstein. On the first ballot on 5 November 2017, Elke Christina Roeder received 24.17% of the vote. In the election on 26 November 2017, she was elected mayor with 55.33% of the vote.
