= Condair Group =

- Type: Corporation
- Industry: Humidification, Dehumidification and Evaporative Cooling
- Founded: 1948
- Headquarters: Pfäffikon/Freienbach, canton of Schwyz, Switzerland
- Key people: Oliver Zimmermann (CEO)
- Revenue: approx. 200 Mio. CHF
- Number of employees: approx. 850
- Website: www.condairgroup.com www.condair.ch

Condair Group AG founded in 1948 and based in Switzerland is the global leader in humidification, dehumidification and evaporative cooling. Condair Group has production sites in Europe, North America and China, its own sales and service organizations in 23 countries, and representatives in 50 locations worldwide. Its head office, including its administrative and research and development departments, are located in Pfäffikon/Freienbach in the Swiss canton of Schwyz.

== Products ==
The Condair Group, known then as Defensor, began to develop and manufacture a rotary sprayer designed to disinfect cattle sheds (to fight foot-and-mouth disease) shortly after the Second World War. Today, the Group produces a wide range of steam humidifiers, steam distribution systems, hybrid humidifiers, adiabatic humidifiers, evaporative coolers, measurement and control technologies and water treatment products. Typical use cases for these include:

- In homes and offices to improve health, productivity and wellbeing by keeping rooms at the ideal humidity
- In healthcare environments to aid recovery and to increase performance
- In a variety of industrial environments, such as those within the printing and paper, textile, wood, automotive and pharmaceutical sectors, to increase productivity and quality
- In food storage environments such as fruit and vegetable warehouses and wine cellars
- In data centers as an efficient way of ensuring that servers are kept cool and/or at the correct humidity
- In cultural institutions (particularly museums and galleries) to protect sensitive paints on canvases and conserve valuable antiquities and musical instruments.

== Company history ==
The foundation of what would later become the Condair Group was laid in 1948, when Defensor developed its own rotary sprayers for disinfecting cattle sheds. Condair's development of electrode steam humidifiers in 1958 launched the company into the HVAC market (heating, ventilation and air conditioning). WMH (now Walter Meier AG, Schwerzenbach, listed in Zurich) took over Defensor AG in 1975 and Condair AG in 1981, followed by the Canadian manufacturer of steam humidifiers, Nortec, including its American sales and distribution network, a year later in 1982. Defensor AG and Condair AG merged in 1995 to become Axair AG, covering the entire spectrum of humidification technologies. The brand names Condair and Defensor were retained. In 2001, WMH acquired Draabe Industrietechnik GmbH, an industrial endcustomer oriented company with a full service business model. Between 2011 and 2014, further acquisitions were made in Denmark (ML-System), England (JS Humidifiers), the Netherlands and Belgium (Geveke Technology Solutions). In 2014, all humidification companies owned by Walter Meier AG were transferred to the Condair Group. The former listed holding of independent small companies then became a private company, now headquartered in Switzerland.

== Technologies and innovations ==
Condair developed the first hybrid humidifier to use two adiabatic humidification methods in parallel, the Condair Dual, in 1997. Its combination of spray and evaporation technologies made the humidification process more hygienic and efficient than using either of the two methods in isolation. In 2000, Condair developed the Condair Mk5, the first steam humidifier to use a patented scale management system to solve the physical problem of scale build-up in the steam cylinders. These systems negate the need for replaceable cylinders.
