= Noel Rohleder =

Australian rules footballer

Personal information
- Full name: Noel William Rohleder
- Born: 18 December 1933 (age 92)
- Original team: Altona
- Height: 173 cm (5 ft 8 in)
- Weight: 58 kg (128 lb)

Playing career^{1}
Years	Club	Games (Goals)
1950	South Melbourne	1 (1)
- ^{1} Playing statistics correct to the end of 1950.

Noel William Rohleder (born 18 December 1933) is a former Australian rules footballer who played with South Melbourne in the Victorian Football League (VFL).

Aged 16 years and 251 days, he was the youngest player to have played for South Melbourne. His brother Kevin Rohleder played 5 games for St Kilda.
