= Graham Page (footballer) =

Australian rules footballer

Personal information
- Full name: Graham Page
- Born: 13 December 1950 (age 75)
- Original team: Altona Under 18s
- Height: 185 cm (6 ft 1 in)
- Weight: 89 kg (196 lb)

Playing career^{1}
Years	Club	Games (Goals)
1969	South Melbourne	1 (0)
- ^{1} Playing statistics correct to the end of 1969.

Graham Page (born 13 December 1950) is a former Australian rules footballer who played with South Melbourne in the Victorian Football League (VFL).
