= Versapay =

Software company in Canada

Versapay Corporation
- Company type: Private
- Industry: Financial services
- Founded: 2006
- Headquarters: San Francisco, California, United States
- Area served: North America
- Number of employees: 411
- Website: Official website

Versapay is a North American financial technology company headquartered in San Francisco, California. Versapay specializes in account receivable software and cash application for midsized businesses. Versapay products include digital invoicing and customer portal, collections management, B2B payment services, cash application, reporting and reconciliation, and ERP integrations. It was listed on the TSX Venture Exchange under the symbol VPY between January 2010 and February 2020 when it was acquired by private equity firm Great Hill Partners for $126 million.

In 2009, Canadian Business Magazine named Versapay Corporation the fastest growing company in Canada. Revenue for Versapay had grown from $50,000 in 2006 to $5.1 Million in 2008. They grew from processing an estimated $230 Million in 2008 from over 2800 clients to processing over $1 billion annually in 2013.

== History ==
Versapay began accepting clients in 2007 as it set up the company's headquarters in Vancouver, BC. Versapay offered payment processing for both B2B (business-to-business) and B2C (business-to-consumer) transactions.

In February 2008, Versapay acquired a 75% interest in Positive Inc., a wireless payment technology provider. In June 2010, Versapay agreed to sell its ownership in Positive Inc. back to the company in return for shares in Versapay. Versapay began trading on the TSX Venture Exchange on January 20, 2010. Versapay shares trade under the symbol "VPY".

January 2017, Versapay received shareholder approval for the sale of its Merchant Services division for proceeds up to $11,000,000. As part of this transition, BluePay (the purchaser) acquired the Montreal office and its staff (except for Patrick MacDonald who has been President of the company since 2007) and all related agents, associations and processing partner relationships related to the merchant services business. The transaction was completed on February 1, 2017. On April 18, 2022, Versapay completed its acquisition of U.S.-based fintech company DadeSystems, a long-term technology partner of Versapay.

== Leadership ==
Versapay Corporation was founded in 2006 by Michael Gokturk and Kevin Short.

In May 2010, shortly after the company's IPO on the Toronto Stock Exchange, the founder and CEO Michael Gokturk was abruptly replaced by the board of directors. Bill McGill, the company's CFO at the time, assumed the role of CEO. Michael Gokturk resurfaced in January 2011 to launch his new payments company Payfirma, which was the first in Canada to deploy mobile payments on smartphones.

In September 2013, Versapay announced the departure of Bill McGill as CEO. Craig O'Neill, previously the co-founder and CEO of Xeye (sold to Odyssey Financial Technologies) - was appointed CEO of Versapay. Carey O'Connor Kolaja was announced as the new CEO on March 7, 2023, replacing O'Neill, who moved to an advisory role.
