= Arenz and Röder v. Germany =

2004 UN Human Rights Committee case

- Court: United Nations Human Rights Committee under the 1^{st} ICCR Optional Protocol
- Full case name: Paul Arenz and Thomas and Dagmar Röder v. The Federal Republic of Germany
- Started: 26 September 2002
- Decided: 24 March 2004
- Session: 59
- Citation(s): CCPR/C/80/D/1138/2002 (Communication №1138/2002) A/59/40 v. II (HRC 2004) ¶548 summarized at v. I ¶101

Holding
- As the proceedings in Germany were not "arbitrary" nor a "denial of justice", the communication was inadmissible.

Committee membership
- Abdelfattah Amor, Nisuke Ando, Prafullachandra Natwarlal Bhagwati, Alfredo Castillero Hoyos, Christine Chanet, Franco Depasquale, Maurice Glèlè Ahanhanzo, Walter Kälin, Ahmed Tawfik Khalil, Rafael Rivas Posada, Sir Nigel Rodley, Martin Scheinin, Ivan Shearer, Hipólito Solari Yrigoyen, Ruth Wedgwood, Roman Wieruszewski, and Maxwell Yalden.

Case opinions
- For the committee
- Opinion in: English, French, and Spanish
- Decided in: Geneva, Switzerland

Laws applied
- International Covenant on Civil and Political Rights; First Optional Protocol to the International Covenant on Civil and Political Rights § 2, § 5 ¶¶ 2(b) et seq.

Area of law
- International law

Paul Arenz and Thomas and Dagmar Röder v. The Federal Republic of Germany (Communication No.1138/2002) was a case decided by the UN Human Rights Committee in 2004.

== Facts ==
In 1991, the Christian Democratic Union declared affiliation with Scientology incompatible with CDU membership. In 1992 and 1994, the applicants were expelled from CDU. Party decisions were upheld by German courts (Para. 2.-3. of the views).

The applicants alleged violations of their rights under articles 2, paragraph 1 (non-discrimination), 18 (freedom of religion), 19 (freedom of expression), 22 (freedom of association), 25 (political participation), 26 (non-discrimination) and 27 (minority rights) of the Covenant (Para. 4.).

== HRC views ==
The committee has rejected Germany's objections that the case was inadmissible due to decisions being taken by a party, not by state (Para. 8.5.).

However, it decided that "8.6. (..) The issue before the Committee is whether the State party violated the authors' rights under the Covenant in that its courts gave priority to the principle of party autonomy, over their wish to be members in a political party that did not accept them due to their membership in another organization of ideological nature. The Committee recalls its constant jurisprudence that it is not a fourth instance competent to reevaluate findings of fact or reevaluate the application of domestic legislation, unless it can be ascertained that the proceedings before the domestic courts were arbitrary or amounted to a denial of justice. (..) the authors have failed to substantiate, for purposes of admissibility, that the conduct of the courts of the State party would have amounted to arbitrariness or a denial of justice. Therefore, the communication is inadmissible".
