= Kevin Rohleder =

Australian rules footballer

Personal information
- Full name: Kevin Stanley Rohleder
- Born: 7 April 1920; Carlton, Victoria
- Died: 14 August 1983 (aged 63); Footscray, Victoria
- Original team: Altona
- Height: 178 cm (5 ft 10 in)
- Weight: 64 kg (141 lb)

Playing career^{1}
Years	Club	Games (Goals)
1941	Williamstown (VFA)	1 (0)
1943	St Kilda	5 (0)
- ^{1} Playing statistics correct to the end of 1943.

Kevin Stanley Rohleder (7 April 1920 – 14 August 1983) was an Australian rules footballer who played for St Kilda in the Victorian Football League (VFL). His brother, Noel Rohleder, played one game for South Melbourne.

Kevin Stanley was born on 7 April 1920 in Carlton, Victoria, the son of Veronica Harriet Stanley (1899–1970), . He later adopted the surname Rohleder after his mother married Walter John Rohleder (1897–1982) in 1923.

Rohleder initially gained attention playing with Altona, and transferred to Williamstown in 1941. However played only a single game against Port Melbourne before being relegated to the reserves. In mid 1942, Rohleder enlisted in the Australian Army, where he served until the end of World War II.

In May 1943, while serving in Melbourne, Rohleder obtained a permit to play with St Kilda. He played five games for St Kilda that season before the Army transferred him to Queensland, where he played in both Australian Rules Football and Rugby League.
