= Geoff Heyme =

Australian rules footballer

Personal information
- Full name: Geoff Heyme
- Born: 10 July 1942 (age 84)
- Original team: Altona
- Height: 183 cm (6 ft 0 in)
- Weight: 72 kg (159 lb)

Playing career^{1}
Years	Club	Games (Goals)
1962–63	South Melbourne	10 (0)
- ^{1} Playing statistics correct to the end of 1963.

Geoff Heyme (born 10 July 1942) is a former Australian rules footballer who played with South Melbourne in the Victorian Football League (VFL).
