= Gilbert V. Rohleder =

American pipeline executive

Gilbert V. Rohleder (April 22, 1922 – January 30, 2016) was a 20th-century American pipeline executive, and one of the founding principals of the Mid-America Pipeline Company, founded in 1960. During his tenure, MAPCO evolved into a Fortune 500 company that was ultimately acquired by the Williams Companies in Tulsa, OK. Rohleder served in World War II as a First Lieutenant being wounded during the Normandy invasion. Rohleder holds an engineering degree from Massachusetts Institute of Technology, and was also selected in 1987 for the Massachusetts Institute of Technology Corporate Leadership Award. Rohleder also served as President of the American Pipeliner's Club, Director of the American Gas Processor's Association, and was a member of the business advisory council of Northwestern University. Rohleder lived in Tulsa, OK with his wife Patricia until his death in 2016.
