= Lexton Plains Football League =

Australian football league

- Founded: 1999
- Folded: 2010

The Lexton Plains Football League was an Australian rules football competition in western Victoria, Australia. The league ran an annual competition from 1999 to 2010.

== History ==
The Western Plains Football League, which was formed in 1930 and the Lexton Football League, which was formed in 1945, both merged in 1999 to form the Lexton Plains Football / Netball League.

The league has a brief twelve yer history, then folded after the 2010 season, with the last grand final being postponed a week, due to the local flooding isolating clubs scheduled to play.

Navarre, Natte-Bealiba and Lexton joined the Maryborough Castlemaine District Football League, the Ararat Eagles joined the Mininera & District Football League and the four other clubs joined the Central Highlands Football League in an 18 team Competition for 2011.

== Clubs ==
=== Final clubs ===
Club	Colours	Nickname	Home Ground	Former League	Est.	Years in comp	LPFL Senior Premierships		Fate
Club	Colours	Nickname	Home Ground	Former League	Est.	Years in comp	Total	Years	Fate
Ararat Eagles		Eagles	Alexandra Oval, Ararat	HDFNL	2000	2001-2010	0	-	Moved to Mininera & District FNL after 2010 season
Carngham Linton		Saints	Carngham Recreation Reserve, Snake Valley	WPFL	1968	1999-2010	4	2000, 2006, 2007, 2008	Moved to Central Highlands FL after 2010 season
Illabarook		Bulldogs	Smythesdale Recreation Reserve, Smythesdale	WPFL	1891	1999-2010	0	-	Moved to Central Highlands FL after 2010 season
Lexton		Tigers	Lexton Recreation Reserve, Lexton	LFL	1920	1999-2010	0	-	Moved to Maryborough Castlemaine District FNL after 2010 season
Natte Bealiba		Swans	Natte Yallock Recreation Reserve, Natte Yallock	LFL	1961	1999-2010	0	-	Moved to Maryborough Castlemaine District FNL after 2010 season
Navarre		Hoppers	Navarre Recreation Reserve, Navarre	LFL	1920	1999-2010	1	1999	Moved to Maryborough Castlemaine District FNL after 2010 season
Rokewood Corindhap		Hoppers	Rokewood Recreation Reserve, Snake Valley	WPFL	1932	1999-2010	2	2002, 2004	Moved to Central Highlands FL after 2010 season
Skipton		Emus	Skipton Recreation Reserve, Skipton	WPFL	1873	1999-2010	5	2001, 2003, 2005, 2009, 2010	Moved to Central Highlands FL after 2010 season

=== Former clubs ===
Club	Colours	Nickname	Home Ground	Former League	Est.	Years in comp	LPFL Senior Premierships		Fate
Club	Colours	Nickname	Home Ground	Former League	Est.	Years in comp	Total	Years	Fate
Avoca		Bulldogs	Avoca Recreation Reserve, Avoca	LFL	1873	1999-2004	0	-	Moved to Maryborough Castlemaine District FNL after 2004 season
Dunolly		Eagles	Dunolly Recreation Reserve, Dunolly	LFL	1873	1999-2000	0	-	Moved to Loddon Valley FNL after 2000 season
Landsborough		Burras	Landsborough Recreation Reserve, Landsborough	LFL	1896	1999-2001	0	-	Folded in 2001
Marnoo		Navy Blues	Marnoo Recreation Reserve, Marnoo	LFL	1900s	1999-2000	0	-	Folded in 2000

== Premiers ==
Senior Football Premiers

Year	Premiers	Score	Runners up	Score	Best on Ground	Venue	Comments
1999	Navarre	18.14 - 122	Carngham-Linton	14.7 - 91	Christian Bibby (N)		
2000	Carngham-Linton	28.17 - 185	Skipton	5.4 - 34	Troy Nunn (CL)		
2001	Skipton	15.7 - 107	Rokewood-Corindhap	6.16 - 52	Wayne Grace (S)		
2002	Rokewood-Corindhap	12.9 - 81	Carngham-Linton	11.7 - 73	Aaron Stewart (RC)		
2003	Skipton	12.16 - 88	Carngham-Linton	10.10 - 70	Darren Fletcher (S)		
2004	Carngham-Linton	16.14 - 110	Skipton	8.10 - 58	Justin Porter (CL)		
2005	Skipton	22.18 - 150	Carngham-Linton	9.9 - 63	Mark McGowan (S)		
2006	Carngham-Linton	12.12 - 84	Skipton	12.9 - 81	Ryan Head (CL)		
2007	Carngham-Linton	13.7 - 85	Natte Bealiba	10.7 - 67	Clint Ladiges (CL)		
2008	Carngham-Linton	13.8 - 86	Skipton	11.14 - 80	Travis Grigg (CL)		
2009	Skipton	17.9 - 111	Carngham-Linton	10.9 - 69	Keirnan Molloy (S)	Learmonth Oval	
2010	Skipton	16.15 - 111	Lexton	3.8 - 26	Scott Fletcher (S)	Eureka Stadium	

Reserves Football

- 2009 - Rokewood-Corindhap: 10.5 - 65 d Carngham-Linton: 7.6 - 48
- 2010 - Skipton: 16.15 - 111 d Lexton: 3.8 - 26

Under 17's

- 2009 - Illabarook: 16.7 - 103 d Carngham-Linton: 3.7 - 25
- 2010 - Skipton: 7.10 - 52 d Rokewood-Corindhap: 5.12 - 42

Under 14's

- 2009 - Skipton: 7.11 - 53 d Navarre: 7.6 - 48
- 2010 - Navarre: 7.7 - 49 d Skipton: 4.4 - 28

Under 12's

- 2009 - Carngham-Linton: 3.5 - 23 d Skipton: 0.1 - 1
- 2010 - Rokewood-Corindhap: 2.3 - 15 d Skipton: 2.2 - 14

== League Best and Fairest ==
Senior Football

Lexton Plains FNL: Best & Fairest / Leading goal-kicker
Season	Peter Smith Medal	Club	Votes	Leading goal-kicker	Club	Goals
1999	Steve Clohesy	Navarre		Troy Nunn	Carngham-Linton	
2000	Marcus Driscoll	Navarre		Shane Hutchins	Dunolly	
2001	Trevor Field	Avoca		Justin Porter	Carngham-Linton	129(140)
2002	Jarrod Bibby	Navarre		Justin Porter	Carngham-Linton	
2003	David Dridan &	Lexton	16	Justin Porter	Carngham-Linton	103
	Ross Waters &	Carngham-Linton	16			
	Nick Watson	Skipton	16			
2004	David Dridan &	Lexton		Justin Porter	Carngham-Linton	100
	Ian Martin	Natte Bealiba				
2005	Darren Fletcher	Skipton	27	Justin Porter	Carngham-Linton	
2006	Tim McKay	Skipton		James McNamee	Natte Bealiba	91
2007	Karl Begbie	Rokewood Corindhap	26	James McNamee	Natte Bealiba	74
2008	Stephen Ross	Natte Bealiba	24	James McNamee	Rokewood Corindhap	77
2009	Jason Hill	Carngham-Linton	24	Thomas Mullane-Grant	Rokewood-Corindhap	79
2010	Ben Martin	Navarre	22	Tim Beecham	Skipton	76

== Senior Football Ladders ==
1999 Ladder

Club	Wins	Byes	Losses	For	Against	%	Pts
Carngham-Linton	17	1	0	2509	1297	193.4	72
Navarre	13	2	3	1882	728	258.5	60
Lexton	13	1	4	1935	1120	172.8	56
Avoca	12	2	4	1558	1281	121.6	56
Skipton	10	1	7	1829	1780	102.8	44
Rokewood-Corindhap	7	2	9	1584	1679	94.3	36
Illabarook	6	2	10	1327	1652	80.3	32
Marnoo	4	2	12	1067	1816	58.8	24
Natte-Bealiba	4	1	13	1189	1585	75.0	20
Dunolly	3	2	13	1221	2249	54.3	20
Landsborough	1	2	15	1095	2009	54.5	12

2008 Ladder

Lexton Plains	Wins	Byes	Losses	Draws	For	Against	%	Pts
Rokewood-Corindhap	15	0	0	1	1797	872	206.08%	62
Skipton	13	0	2	1	1654	1212	136.47%	54
Carngham-Linton	12	0	4	0	1858	1235	150.45%	48
Navarre	7	0	9	0	1199	1276	93.97%	28
Illabarook	6	0	10	0	1234	1469	84.00%	24
Lexton	5	0	10	1	1267	1571	80.65%	22
Natte-Bealiba	3	0	13	0	1157	1464	79.03%	12
Ararat Eagles	1	0	14	1	773	1840	42.01%	6

2008 FINALS

Final	Team	G	B	Pts	Team	G	B	Pts
Elimination	Illabarook	10	7	67	Navarre	6	9	45
Qualifying	Carngham-Linton	20	12	132	Skipton	8	12	60
1st Semi	Skipton	20	9	129	Illabarook	12	5	77
2nd Semi	Carngham-Linton	17	12	114	Rokewood-Corindhap	14	3	87
Preliminary	Skipton	4	7	31	Rokewood-Corindhap	3	7	25
Grand	Carngham-Linton	13	8	86	Skipton	11	14	80

2009 Ladder

Lexton Plains	Wins	Byes	Losses	Draws	For	Against	%	Pts
Skipton	15	0	1	0	1897	902	210.31%	60
Carngham-Linton	12	0	4	0	1529	1003	152.44%	48
Rokewood-Corindhap	12	0	4	0	1563	1072	145.80%	48
Navarre	9	0	7	0	1408	1247	112.91%	36
Natte-Bealiba	5	0	11	0	966	1583	61.02%	20
Illabarook	4	0	12	0	1068	1543	69.22%	16
Lexton	4	0	12	0	1018	1593	63.90%	16
Ararat Eagles	3	0	13	0	951	1457	65.27%	12

2009 FINALS

Final	Team	G	B	Pts	Team	G	B	Pts
Elimination	Navarre	15	12	102	Natte-Bealiba	4	7	31
Qualifying	Rokewood-Corindhap	13	8	86	Carngham-Linton	9	17	71
1st Semi	Carngham-Linton	19	9	123	Navarre	9	6	60
2nd Semi	Skipton	11	18	84	Rokewood-Corindhap	9	7	61
Preliminary	Carngham-Linton	20	3	123	Rokewood-Corindhap	8	12	60
Grand	Skipton	17	9	111	Carngham-Linton	10	9	69

2010 Ladder

Lexton Plains	Wins	Byes	Losses	Draws	For	Against	%	Pts
Skipton	15	0	1	0	1909	834	228.90%	60
Rokewood-Corindhap	12	0	4	0	1382	893	154.76%	48
Lexton	11	0	5	0	1385	914	151.53%	44
Navarre	11	0	5	0	1209	972	124.38%	44
Carngham-Linton	7	0	9	0	1305	1118	116.73%	28
Illabarook	5	0	11	0	927	1301	71.25%	20
Natte-Bealiba	3	0	13	0	939	1234	76.09%	12
Ararat Eagles	0	0	16	0	567	2357	24.06%	0

2010 FINALS

Final	Team	G	B	Pts	Team	G	B	Pts
Elimination	Carngham-Linton	6	8	44	Navarre	5	7	37
Qualifying	Lexton	5	7	37	Rokewood-Corindhap	1	7	13
1st Semi	Rokewood-Corindhap	15	10	100	Carngham-Linton	4	8	32
2nd Semi	Lexton	11	5	71	Skipton	8	15	63
Preliminary	Skipton	8	10	58	Rokewood-Corindhap	6	4	40
Grand	Skipton	16	15	111	Lexton	3	8	26

== Lexton Football League ==
The Lexton FL was formed in 1945, with the six foundation club's being - Amphitheatre, Avoca, Lexton, Moonambel, Natte Yallock, Talbot and Waubra.

In 1983, Lexton: 30.24.204 defeated Dunolly: 11.14 - 80, which is the record for the highest score in a senior football grand final.

The best on ground award in the Lexton FL senior football competition received the Mervyn Howard Memorial Award, which was first awarded in 1996.

The Lexton FL merged with the Western Plains Football League in 1999 to form the Lexton Plains Football League.

Senior Football Premiers

Year	Premiers	Score	Runners up	Score	Best on Ground	Venue	Comments
1945	Lexton	14.20 - 104	Moonambel	12.10 - 82			
1946	Waubra	defeated	Moonambel			Avoca	
1947	Waubra	19.13 - 127	Navarre	15.18 - 108		Lexton	
1948	Waubra	18.12 - 120	Beaufort	10.14 - 74		Avoca	
1949	Navarre	19.16 - 130	Waubra	16.8 - 104		Lexton	
1950	Waubra	15.12 - 102	Lexton	12.8 - 80		Avoca	
1951	Navarre	18.18 - 126	Waubra	18.14 - 122		Avoca	
1952	Navarre	14.15 - 99	Moonambel	11.12 - 78			
1953	Avocca	15.10 - 100	Navarre	12.20 - 92		Lexton	
1954	Navarre	20.11 - 131	Waubra	10.5 - 65		Avoca	
1955	Waubra	12.15 - 87	Navarre	9.13 - 67			
1956	Waubra	9.15 - 69	Navarre	8.11 - 59		Avoca	
1957	Waubra	15.13 - 103	Moonambel	4.7 - 31		Avoca	
1958	Navarre	21.18 - 144	Waubra	8.5 - 53		Lexton	
1959	Navarre	12.14 - 86	Beaufort	5.15 - 45		Avoca	
1960	Waubra	15.12 - 102	Lexton	9.9 - 63		Avoca	
1961	Navarre	12.10 - 82	Waubra	5.15 - 45		Avoca	
1962	Navarre	13.12 - 90	Beaufort	11.9 - 75		Avoca	
1963	Lexton	11.15 - 81	Beaufort	12.8 - 80		Avoca	
1964	Beaufort	23.14 - 152	Lexton	7.9 - 51		Avoca	
1965	Beaufort	12.13 - 85	Navarre	12.9 - 81		Avoca	
1966	Lexton	17.11 - 113	Natte Bealiba	12.9 - 81		Avoca	
1967	Lexton	12.13 - 85	Natte Bealiba	11.9 - 75		Avoca	
1968	Lexton	11.16 - 82	Natte Bealiba	11.11 - 77		Avoca	
1969	Natte Bealiba	13.12 - 90	Lexton	11.14 - 80		Avoca	
1970	Natte Bealiba	16.16 - 112	Lexton	11.15 - 81		Avoca	
1971	Lexton	10.20 - 80	Avoca	9.14 - 68		Moonambel	
1972	Lexton	6.25 - 61	Avoca	5.11 - 41		Natte Yallock	
1973	Moonambel	15.14 - 104	Lexton	13.15 - 93		Avoca	
1974	Lexton	12.9 - 81	Moonambel	6.8 - 44		Avoca	
1975	Navarre	16.17 - 113	Lexton	11.13 - 79		Moonambel	
1976	Lexton	11.15 - 81	Natte Bealiba	11.9 - 75		Avoca	
1977	Navarre	11.13 - 79	Natte Bealiba	12.5 - 77		Avoca	
1978	Lexton	15.18 - 108	Navarre	11.14 - 80		Moonambel	
1979	Moonambel	21.16 - 142	Avoca	17.13 - 115		Natte Yallock	
1980	Avoca	11.17 - 83	Natte Bealiba	7.10 - 52		Moonambel	
1981	Avoca	20.20 - 140	Lexton	14.13 - 97		Navarre	
1982	Navarre	14.16 - 100	Natte Bealiba	9.15 - 69		Lexton	
1983	Lexton	30.24 - 204	Dunolly	11.14 - 80		Moonambel	
1984	Landsborough	14.14 - 98	Lexton	12.13 - 85		Navarre	
1985	Landsborough	18.10 - 118	Lexton	14.9 - 93		Natte Yallock	
1986	Landsborough	14.14 - 98	Lexton	10.13 - 73		Navarre	
1987	Manoo	11.14 - 80	Lexton	10.10 - 70		Avoca	
1988	Lexton	7.7 - 49	Navarre	4.8 - 32		Dunolly	
1989	Navarre	18.15 - 123	Marnoo	10.8 - 68		Avoca	
1990	Navarre	23.10 - 148	Avoca	9.12 - 66		Lexton	
1991	Navarre	15.19 - 109	Lexton	11.9 - 75		Marnoo	
1992	Lexton	9.12 - 66	Navarre	7.5 - 47		Dunolly	
1993	Avoca	14.9 - 93	Natte Bealiba	11.18 - 84		Landsborough	
1994	Natte Bealiba	15.15 - 105	Avoca	11.12 - 78		Lexton	
1995	Natte Bealiba	14.12 - 96	Navarre	8.14 - 62		Marnoo	
1996	Avoca	11.18 - 84	Natte Bealiba	7.6 - 48	Phil Canny (A)	Dunolly	
1997	Avoca	17.8 - 110	Dunolly	14.10 - 94	Jim Jess (A)	Landsborough	
1998	Avoca	17.5 - 107	Lexton	5.11 - 41	Phil Canny (A)	Navarre	
Year	Premiers	Score	Runner Up	Score	Best on Ground	Venue	Comments

	Lexton FL SENIORS – Best & Fairest Medal / Leading Goalkicker					
Year	Winner	Club	Votes	Goalkicking	Club	Goals
1945						
1946	W T Rattray	Navarre		W T Rattray	Navarre	140
1947	L Dunn	Landsborough		A Grossman	Navarre	108
1948	K Morvell	Beaufort				
1949	J Briody	Lexton		H Hannett	Navarre	106
1950	Mel Morley	Amphitheatre				
1951	Max Vickery	Lexton				
1952	Jack Clark	Beaufort				
1953	Jack Clark	Beaufort				
1954	Jack Clark	Beaufort		Frank Driscoll	Navarre	106
1955	Colin Biddy	Navarre		Frank Driscoll	Navarre	127
1956	D Wright	Moonambel				
1957	Alan Streeter	Avoca				
1958	Jack Biddy	Navarre				
1959	David Norman	Beaufort				
1960	Jack Biddy	Navarre				
1961	Jack Biddy	Navarre				
1962	Gerry Brennan	Navarre		Rod Branigan	Lexton	80
1963	Bill Candy	Amphitheatre		Rod Branigan	Lexton	70
1964	Bill Candy	Amphitheatre		J Meadows	Beaufort	64
1965	Jack Hutchings	Beaufort		Gerry Brennan	Navarre	94
1966	Howard Lockett	Lexton		Keith Hunt	Natte Bealiba	88
1967	Greg Wright	Natte Bealiba		Keith Hunt	Natte Bealiba	73
1968	Henry Gunstone	Navarre		Brian Coghlan	Avoca	66
1969	Merv White	Lexton		Brian Coghlan	Avoca	99
1970	Graham Sandlant &	Lansborough		Jim Gull	Natte Bealiba	68
	Trevor Thomas	Navarre				
1971	Howard Lockett	Lexton		Rob Astbury	Avoca	75(84)
1972	Neil Hall	Marnoo		Laurie Plowman	Landsborough	124
1973	Joe Peacock	Landsborough		Laurie Plowman	Landsborough	109
1974	Jeff Lillingston	Moonambel		Gary Studd	Navarre	80
1975	Wayne Jones	Marnoo		Gary Studd	Navarre	77
1976	Julian Kaye	Lexton		Peter Armarant	Landsborough	57
1977	Chris Bibby	Navarre		Warren Grant	Landsborough	60
1978	Julian Kaye	Lexton		Terry Page	Lexton	85
1979	Wayne Deledio	Avoca		Neil Butterworth	Moonambel	
1980	Wayne Deledio	Avoca	23	Terry Page	Lexton	85
1981	John Lovell	Marnoo		Graham Gordon	Natte Bealiba	90
1982	Pat Bigmore	Navarre		Gerard Darcy	Avoca	115
1983	Ricard Field &	Avoca		Leigh Hunt	Dunolly	114
	Steve Kirby	Lexton				
1984	Pat Bigmore	Navarre		Peter Rivett	Landsborough	101
1985	Pat Bigmore	Navarre		Peter Rivett	Landsborough	82
1986	Chris Guthrie	Marnoo		Leigh Hunt	Dunolly	83
1987	Brent Dyer	Navarre		Peter Rivett	Landsborough	57
1988	Brad Gooch &	Natte Bealiba		Brendan Lowrie	Navarre	43
	Neil Robinson	Natte Bealiba				
1989	Tony Beck	Navarre		Tim Bibby	Navarre	74
1990	Tony Beck	Navarre		Bruce Austerberry	Navarre	74
1991	Paul Campigli	Landsborough		Terry Hillier	Natte Bealiba	86
1992	Paul Campigli	Landsborough		Geoff Le Poidiven	Lexton	72
1993	David Edwards	Avoca		Jim Jess	Avoca	103
1994	Fabian Bigmore	Navarre		Warren Howell	Avoca	70
1995	Craig Evans	Navarre		Troy Janssen	Landsborough	49
1996	Les Brennan	Avoca		Malcom Scott	Avoca	96
1997	Les Brennan	Avoca		Robert Redpath	Avoca	79
1998	Malcom Sargent	Lexton		Leigh Hunt	Dunolly	65
