= Robert E. Roeder =

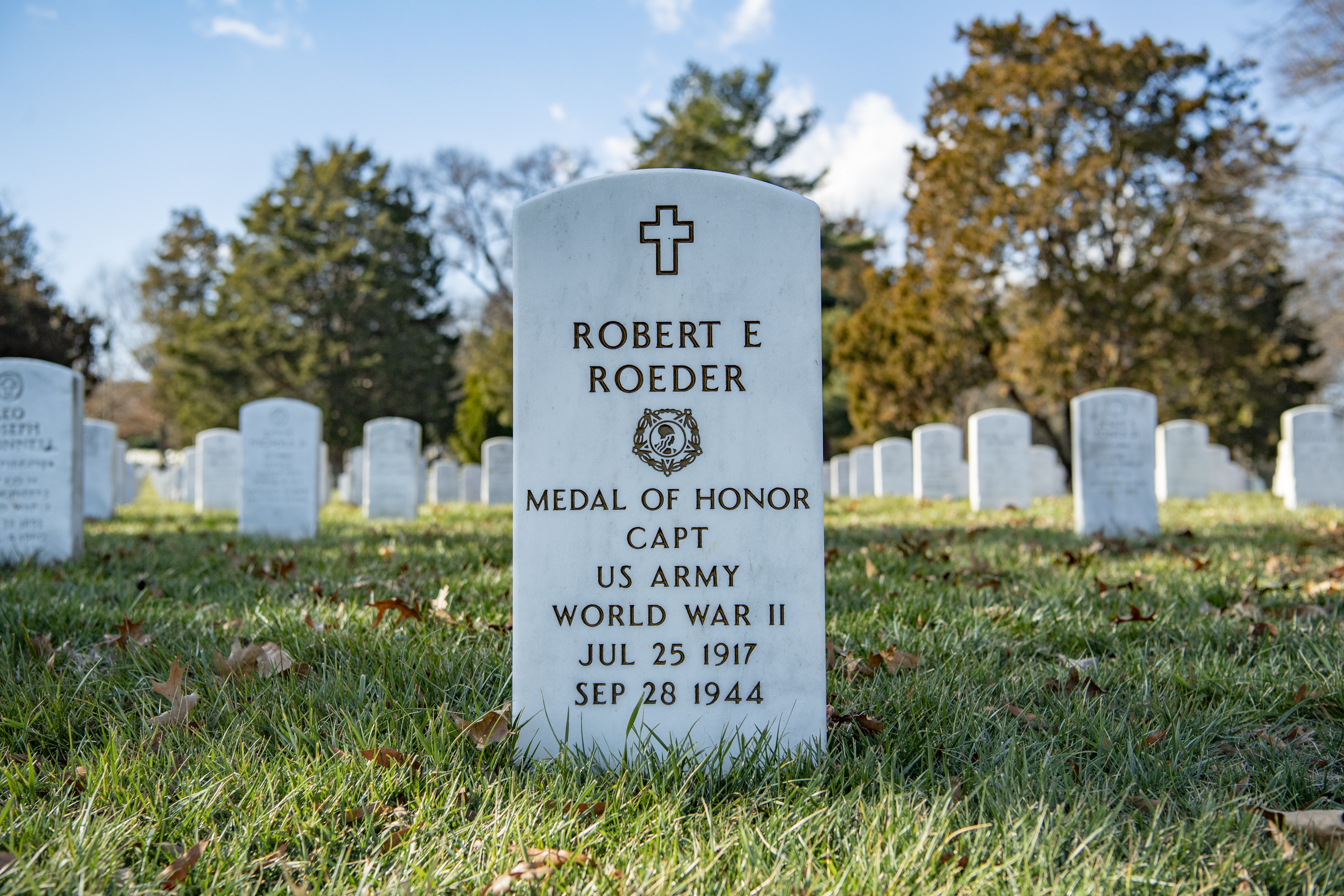
- Grave at Arlington National Cemetery
- Born: July 25, 1917; Summit Station, Pennsylvania
- Died: September 28, 1944 (aged 27); Killed in action in Battaglia, Italy
- Burial place: Arlington National Cemetery
- Military career
- Allegiance: United States of America
- Branch: United States Army
- Service years: 1936–1944
- Rank: Captain
- Units: 350th Infantry Regiment, 88th Infantry Division
- Conflicts: World War II
- Awards: Medal of Honor

Robert E. Roeder (July 25, 1917 – September 28, 1944) was a captain in the U.S. Army who received the Medal of Honor for his heroic actions during World War II, during which he was killed in action. Roeder is buried in Arlington National Cemetery.

Roeder joined the army from his birthplace in 1936.

== Medal of Honor citation ==
Rank and Organization: Captain, U.S. Army, Company G, 350th Infantry, 88th Infantry Division. Place and Date Mt. Battaglia, Italy, 27–28 September 1944. Entered Service at: Summit Station, Pa. Birth: Summit Station, Pa. G.O. No.: 31, 17 April 1945.

For conspicuous gallantry and intrepidity at risk of life above and beyond the call of duty. Capt. Roeder commanded his company in defense of the strategic Mount Battaglia. Shortly after the company had occupied the hill, the Germans launched the first of a series of determined counterattacks to regain this dominating height. Completely exposed to ceaseless enemy artillery and small-arms fire, Capt. Roeder constantly circulated among his men, encouraging them and directing their defense against the persistent enemy. During the sixth counterattack, the enemy, by using flamethrowers and taking advantage of the fog, succeeded in overrunning the position. Capt. Roeder led his men in a fierce battle at close quarters, to repulse the attack with heavy losses to the Germans. The following morning, while the company was engaged in repulsing an enemy counterattack in force, Capt. Roeder was seriously wounded and rendered unconscious by shell fragments. He was carried to the company command post, where he regained consciousness. Refusing medical treatment, he insisted on rejoining his men. Although in a weakened condition, Capt. Roeder dragged himself to the door of the command post and, picking up a rifle, braced himself in a sitting position. He began firing his weapon, shouted words of encouragement, and issued orders to his men. He personally killed 2 Germans before he himself was killed instantly by an exploding shell. Through Capt. Roeder's able and intrepid leadership his men held Mount Battaglia against the aggressive and fanatical enemy attempts to retake this important and strategic height. His valorous performance is exemplary of the fighting spirit of the U.S. Army.

== Awards and Decorations ==

| Badge | Combat Infantryman Badge | | |
| 1st row | Medal of Honor | | |
| 2nd row | Bronze Star Medal Retroactively Awarded, 1947 | Purple Heart | American Defense Service Medal |
| 3rd row | American Campaign Medal | European–African–Middle Eastern Campaign Medal with 1 Campaign star | World War II Victory Medal |
| Unit awards | Presidential Unit Citation | | |

88th Infantry Division Insignia

== Additional honors ==
A newly built american military installation in Salzburg, Allied-occupied Austria, was named Camp Roeder in his honor in 1951 (today Schwarzenbergkaserne of austrian Austrian Armed Forces/Bundesheer).

== See also ==
- List of Medal of Honor recipients
- List of Medal of Honor recipients for World War II
