= Gabriel Szondy =

Gabriel Szondy is an Australian accountant in the taxation and superannuation industries. Szondy is, however, best known for being a former president of the Melbourne Football Club. He is currently the chair of the Centre for Institutional Investors (CII) and is an independent director of CareSuper, on Military Super's Board of Trustees and is chair of the board of Frontier Advisors. Previously, Szondy has been a senior accounting partner at PriceWaterhouseCoopers and head of their Melbourne-based superannuation tax practice. He has also been chairman of Association of Superannuation Funds in Australia's (ASFA) National Taxation Policy Committee, chairman of the ASFA's Victorian Executive for 12 years.

== Melbourne Football Club president ==
Szondy became president of the Melbourne Football Club on 18 December 2001, ousting previous and controversial president Joseph Gutnick with approximately 65% of the vote. All ten members of Szondy's "Team Vision" running ticket were elected to the board, which included former players, Robert Flower and Gary Hardeman, ABC journalist Beverley O'Connor and Szondy's successor as president, Paul Gardner.

During May 2003, Szondy apologised to the club's players, as a result of comments he had made about the football department the previous week. Szondy had suggested that "drastic action" would need to be taken if the team's poor form continued. The Demons, however, responded with a win the following week against Port Adelaide and Melbourne Football Club senior coach Neale Daniher was widely defended by the football community, including by fellow senior coaches Mick Malthouse and Denis Pagan. Szondy then apologised for "anything that had taken their focus off football last week", saying it was "regrettable" and that he was "sorry".

Midway through the 2003 season, Szondy announced that he would step down as president of the Melbourne Football Club at the end of the season. He appointed board member Paul Gardner as his successor in the role and Gardner did become president for the 2004 season.

Sporting positions
Preceded by Joseph Gutnick	President of the Melbourne Football Club; 2001–2003	Succeeded by Paul Gardner
