= Wartman =

Surname list

Wartman is a surname. Notable people with the surname include:

- Mark Wartman (born 1951), Canadian politician
- Ray Wartman (1915–2008), Australian football player
