= Tulloh =

Tulloh is a surname. Notable people with the surname include:

- Bruce Tulloh (1935–2018), English long-distance runner
- Percy Tulloh (1900–1970), Australian rules football player
