= 1872 Victorian football season =

3rd senior season of Australian rules football in Victoria

- Senior teams: 6
- Premiers: Melbourne; 2nd premiership

The 1872 Victorian football season was the third senior season of Australian rules football in the colony of Victoria. Melbourne was the premier club for the second time.

== 1872 season ==
Four metropolitan clubs participated in senior football during the 1872 season: Albert-park, Carlton, Melbourne and South Yarra. Geelong and Ballarat also played, but since they played too few games, they are not listed with the metropolitan clubs below.

Melbourne was the premier club for the season, with Carlton runners-up. The two clubs were the dominant senior clubs in the colony, and the premiership was mostly determined based on the head-to-head record in matches between the two: their four matches yielded two wins for Melbourne, one win for Carlton and one draw. Albert-park was placed third, its only win coming against South Yarra, who once again failed to win a game against any of the other principal clubs.

There was no Challenge Cup contested by the senior clubs during the 1872 season, but in the junior competition, a Junior Challenge Cup was established, contested and paid for equally by the four leading junior clubs: Collingwood, East Melbourne, Richmond and Southern. The cup was contested as a round-robin amongst the four teams, with each club playing the others twice, earning two premiership points for a win and one for a draw. Richmond won the cup with eight points; Collingwood was second with seven points; East Melbourne was third with six points; and Southern was fourth with three points. The junior clubs played several games at odds against the seniors, with the seniors usually fielding sixteen men to the juniors' twenty, compared with fifteen-to-twenty in 1871.

=== Senior results ===
The following table shows the clubs' senior results during the year amongst the four Challenge Cup teams, plus matches Carlton played against Geelong and Ballarat, and a match South Yarra played against Geelong. Matches played against junior clubs and/or at odds are not included in the table.

1872 Senior Clubs' Results
No.	TEAM	P	W	L	D	GF	GA
1	Melbourne (P)	8	5	1	2	5	1
2	Carlton	9	5	2	2	11	3
3	Albert-park	5	1	3	1	3	6
4	South Yarra	5	0	5	0	0	9
Key: P = Played, W = Won, L = Lost, D = Drawn, GF = Goals For, GA = Goals Against, (P) = Premiers						Source:	

== Notable events ==
- The ball-up was introduced to the rules of the game in 1872. Until 1871, a scrimmage would be allowed to continue until the ball was won; but from 1872, the central umpire was able to intervene and throw the ball into the air for a neutral contest whenever a scrimmage formed.
- On 14 September, a match was played at even strength between Melbourne and a team comprising five players from each of the four main junior clubs. The match was drawn 1–1.
