= Barrie Vagg =

Australian rules footballer

Personal information
- Born: 21 January 1943 (age 83); Kyabram, Victoria
- Original team: Shepparton (GVFL)
- Height: 182 cm (6 ft 0 in)
- Weight: 73 kg (161 lb)

Playing career^{1}
Years	Club	Games (Goals)
1962–1969	Melbourne	115 (132)
- ^{1} Playing statistics correct to the end of 1969.

Barrie Vagg (born 21 January 1943) is a former Australian rules footballer who played with Melbourne in the Victorian Football League (VFL) during the 1960s.

Vagg was recruited by Footscray in 1960 but failed to get a senior game and left at the end of the season. A half forward, he joined Melbourne for the 1962 season and was a member of their 1964 premiership team. In 1966, when Melbourne had abruptly declined to second last with just three wins, Vagg topped the club's goalkicking with the low total of 20 goals.
