= Maurie Gibb =

Australian rules footballer, born 1914

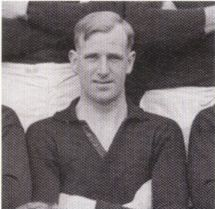

Personal information
- Full name: Maurice Peter Gibb
- Born: 7 February 1914; Carlton, Victoria
- Died: 6 August 2000 (aged 86)
- Original team: Rosedale
- Height: 183 cm (6 ft 0 in)
- Weight: 78 kg (172 lb)

Playing career^{1}
Years	Club	Games (Goals)
1934–1943	Melbourne	133 (167)
- ^{1} Playing statistics correct to the end of 1943.

Career highlights
- 2× VFL premierships: 1940, 1941; Melbourne leading goalkicker: 1935; Melbourne Hall of Fame

Maurice Peter Gibb (7 February 1914 – 6 August 2000) was an Australian rules footballer who played for Melbourne in the Victorian Football League (VFL) during the 1930s and early 1940s.

Gibb originally tried out for Carlton but after being rejected was picked up by Melbourne after winning the 1933 Gippsland Football League's best and fairest award, the Trood Medal.

He was a forward and had his most prolific season in 1935 when he topped Melbourne's goalkicking with 59 goals in a tally which included two bags of nine. In 1940 and 1941 Gibb played in back to back premiership teams.
