= Harry Brereton =

Australian rules footballer

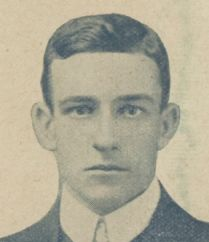

Personal information
- Full name: Henry Evan Brereton
- Born: 13 June 1887; Port Melbourne, Victoria
- Died: 31 December 1950 (aged 63); Melbourne, Victoria
- Original team: Port Melbourne Railway United
- Debut: Round 1, 1909, Melbourne vs. Richmond, at Punt Road
- Height: 180 cm (5 ft 11 in)
- Weight: 72 kg (159 lb)

Playing career^{1}
Years	Club	Games (Goals)
1909–12, 1915	Melbourne	85 (187)
1919–22	South Melbourne	17 (52)
Total		102 (239)
- ^{1} Playing statistics correct to the end of 1922.

Career highlights
- VFL leading goalkicker 1912

Henry Evan Brereton (13 June 1887 – 31 December 1950) was an Australian rules footballer who played with Melbourne and South Melbourne in the Victorian Football League (VFL).

== Football ==
Originally recruited from Port Melbourne Railway United, Brereton made a startling entry into VFL football in 1909. After a slow start, he kicked nine goals against Geelong in only his seventh match. This was the most goals kicked by a player in a match since Jim McShane kicked eleven against St Kilda in 1899, and Brereton continued to top Melbourne's goalkicking for the year with 34 goals.

After a disappointing 1910, Brereton, who was one of the most accurate kicks in the VFL at the time with the long-obsolete place kick, rebounded solidly in 1911 to kick 46 goals and be second in the goalkicking behind Vin Gardiner. He kicked five of his team's six goals on the coldest-ever VFL/AFL match day of 7.1 °C (44.8 °F) in the twelfth round against eventual premier Essendon. The following year, he did even better, heading the VFL goalkicking with fifty-six goals, but a long-term illness meant Brereton could not play a single match in 1913, and despite expectations he would return for 1914, a recurrence meant he again could not appear at all.

1915, however saw him return to the Redlegs and with Roy Park provide a potent forward line that lifted Melbourne into the finals for the first time since 1902. Owing to the club's amateur tradition, however, Melbourne withdrew from the VFL from 1916 to 1918 – there were also problems with the availability of the MCG which was used mainly for schoolboy matches – and when Melbourne did resume in the VFL Brereton was cleared to join South Melbourne but did not play for them until Round 11. When he did play. however, Brereton shows he had not lost his skill, kicking eleven goals in his first two games in the red and white, including six of their record score of 29 goals 15 against St Kilda. After that, however, injury and work with the Melbourne Cricket Club caused Brereton to fade from the scene, though when South were short of forwards he was recalled from retirement at the age of thirty-five in 1922 and still kicked five goals in each of his last two games with Fitzroy and Geelong.

Later in his life, Brereton served as secretary of the Victorian Cricket Association.
