= Greg Parke =

Australian rules footballer (1948–2021)

Personal information
- Born: 18 April 1948
- Died: 25 September 2021 (aged 73)
- Original team: Bentleigh
- Height: 185 cm (6 ft 1 in)
- Weight: 85 kg (187 lb)
- Position: Centre half-forward

Playing career^{1}
Years	Club	Games (Goals)
1968–1973	Melbourne	119 (169)
1974–1975	Footscray	37 (56)
1976	Norwood	18 (32)
1977	Fitzroy	15 (17)
Total		189 (274)
- ^{1} Playing statistics correct to the end of 1977.

Greg Parke (18 April 1948 – 25 September 2021) was an Australian rules footballer who played for Melbourne, Footscray and Fitzroy in the Victorian Football League (VFL).

Parke made his VFL debut in 1968 with Melbourne and finished the season with more Brownlow Medal votes than any other Melbourne player. He played most of his football at centre half forward and in 1970 took 238 marks, the most in the league that season. He held the AFL record for most marks in a game. His best year in front of goal came in 1972 when he topped Melbourne's goalkicking with 63 goals.

In 1974 he crossed to Footscray where he played two seasons before finishing his career with one-year stints at Norwood in the South Australian National Football League and Fitzroy.

He died on the day that two of his former teams, Melbourne and the Western Bulldogs, met in the 2021 AFL Grand Final.
