= Joe Blair =

Australian football club executive

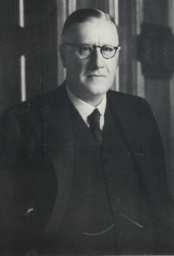

Joe C. Blair (died 23 September 1946), known as J. C. Blair and JCB, was president of the Melbourne Football Club, treasurer of the Melbourne Cricket Club, vice-president of the Victorian Football League (VFL) and deputy chairman of the Vacuum Oil Company.

== Early life ==
Blair had an outstanding school sporting career and was the Victorian mixed doubles champion in tennis three times. He also won the singles and doubles championship of South Australia and regularly partnered Sir Norman Brookes. Bowles was another sport at which he excelled.

== Vacuum Oil ==
Blair was associated with Vacuum Oil Company for 41 years. In that time he worked as a clerk, assistant accountant, chief clerk, chief accountant, with the financial directorate and finally as deputy chairman of the company for eight years. He retired on 31 May 1946.

== Sporting administrator ==
=== Football ===
Blair was the president of the Melbourne Football Club for 18 years, from 1929, taking over the presidency from Vernon Ransford, until his death in 1946, when he was succeeded by William Flintoft. He was made a life member of the club prior to 1943. During his time as president Blair met and convinced star West Australian player, Stan "Pops" Heal, to play for the club for the 1941 season. Although Heal only played eight games, he contributed to Melbourne winning their third consecutive premiership.

During the time he was president of Melbourne, Blair was also vice-president of the Victorian Football League, of which he became a life member.

=== Cricket ===
Blair became a member of the Melbourne Cricket Club Committee in 1929. He became treasurer on 29 July 1941 and served in that position until his death. He was made a life member in 1945.

== Legacy ==
Blair was inducted into the Melbourne Football Club's Hall of Fame in 2008, as a 'Pioneer and Administrator'. The University of Melbourne Cricket Club plays Adelaide University Cricket Club for the "J. C. Blair Trophy", in an annual Intervarsity match. The trophy was first awarded in 1949, when it was presented by Blair's son Syd, a Melbourne University player.

Sporting positions
Preceded by Vernon Ransford	President of the Melbourne Football Club; 1929–1946	Succeeded by William Flintoft
