= Harry Harker =

Australian rules footballer

Personal information
- Full name: Frederick Henry Harker
- Born: 22 December 1887; Essendon, Victoria
- Died: 22 June 1961 (aged 73); Mildura, Victoria
- Original team: Brunswick (VFA)
- Position: Forward

Playing career^{1}
Years	Club	Games (Goals)
1912–1919	Brunswick (VFA)	83 (169)
1920–1924	Melbourne (VFL)	54 (146)
- ^{1} Playing statistics correct to the end of 1924.

Frederick Henry "Harry" Harker (22 December 1887 – 22 June 1961) was an Australian rules footballer who originally played for the Brunswick Football Club in the Victorian Football Association (VFA) and then played for the Melbourne Football Club in the Victorian Football League (VFL).

== Family ==
The son of Thomas Harker, and Catherine Harker, née Griffiths, Frederick Henry Harker was born in Essendon, Victoria on 22 December 1887.

He married Louisa Kimber (1888–1975) in 1913.

== Career ==
A farmer in Bayles, Victoria, Harker played with Brunswick in the VFA for eight years, before making the decision to play for the Melbourne in the VFL, the highest level of Australian rules football competition at the time. He debuted for Melbourne in round 2 of the 1920 season against Essendon, at 32 years of age, making Harker the oldest player to ever debut for the Melbourne Football Club.

In his first three seasons, in 1920, 1921 and 1922, Harker was Melbourne's leading goal kicker, with 23, 47 and 47 goals respectively. In the 1921 season, in round 21, Harker kicked ten goals against Geelong, in his best performance in the VFL. Melbourne won the match kicking 16 goals in total. Harker still holds the record for the most goals kicked on the Melbourne Cricket Ground (MCG) in round 18.

The 1923 season was, however, less successful for Harker, playing only six games, losing all of them and kicking just 13 goals. 1924 would be Harker's last season for Melbourne and his last in the VFL. It was a slight improvement on 1923, as he played seven games and kicked 16 goals, but, ultimately, Harker retired at the end of the season, playing his last game at 36 years of age and "regret[ting] that he had not gone to the VFL in the first place".

== Later life ==
Harker was the Treasurer of the Rotary Club of Brunswick from 1952 to 1954.

== Death ==
He died in Mildura, Victoria on 21 June 1961.
