= Stephen Bickford =

Australian rules footballer

Personal information
- Full name: Stephen Bickford
- Born: 27 September 1960 (age 66)
- Original team: Wesley College
- Height: 187 cm (6 ft 2 in)
- Weight: 87 kg (192 lb)

Playing career^{1}
Years	Club	Games (Goals)
1980–1981	Melbourne	15 (4)
- ^{1} Playing statistics correct to the end of 1981.

Stephen Bickford (born 27 September 1960) is a former Australian rules footballer who represented the Melbourne Football Club in the Victorian Football League (VFL) during the 1980s.

Son of 1948 Melbourne Premiership player George Bickford, Bickford was named Rookie of the Year in 1980. After a second season of 6 games, he left the club after 1981. He later served on the club's board from 1999 to 2008.
