= Alan Rowarth =

Australian rules footballer

Personal information
- Full name: Alan William Michael Rowarth
- Born: 24 August 1936 (age 90)
- Original team: Birregurra
- Height: 177 cm (5 ft 10 in)
- Weight: 77 kg (170 lb)

Playing career^{1}
Years	Club	Games (Goals)
1958–1963	Melbourne	70 (90)
- ^{1} Playing statistics correct to the end of 1963.

Alan William Michael Rowarth (born 24 August 1936) is a former Australian rules footballer who played for Melbourne in the Victorian Football League (VFL).

Rowarth first played with Melbourne in 1958 and despite playing 10 games that year he missed the Grand Final. He made the decider however the following season and, playing as full-forward, helped his team win by kicking four goals, bringing his season tally to 42. Rowarth enjoyed premiership success again in 1960.
