= Ray Biffin =

Australian rules footballer and cricketer (born 1949)

Personal information
- Full name: Raymond Leo Biffin
- Born: 6 May 1949 (age 77)
- Original team: North Launceston (NTFA)
- Height: 182 cm (6 ft 0 in)
- Weight: 92 kg (203 lb)

Playing career^{1}
Years	Club	Games (Goals)
1968–1979	Melbourne	170 (131)
- ^{1} Playing statistics correct to the end of 1979.

Raymond Leo Biffin (born 6 May 1949 in Launceston) is a former Australian rules footballer who played with Melbourne in the Victorian Football League (VFL).

Launceston-born Ray Biffin went to the mainland in 1968 and joined Melbourne after starting his career in the NTFA. He was known for his robust physical approach to the game and played most games at either full-forward or fullback. He topped Melbourne's goalkicking in 1976 with 47 goals. When he left the club after the 1979 season he became coach of Dandenong. He is an inductee (No. 153) of the Tasmanian Football Hall of Fame.

He was also a cricketer. In the 1967–68 season he played a first-class match for Tasmania against the touring Indian team, making 10 runs and taking two wickets. When he took the wicket of Ajit Wadekar he became one of the small number of players who have taken a wicket with their first ball in first-class cricket.

== See also ==
- List of Tasmanian representative cricketers
