= George Margitich =

Australian rules footballer (1908–1958)

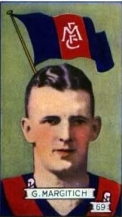

Personal information
- Full name: George Francis Margitich
- Born: 18 November 1908; Adelaide, South Australia
- Died: 17 January 1958 (aged 49); Adelaide, South Australia
- Original teams: South Adelaide (SANFL), Rostrevor College
- Height: 6 ft 0 in (184 cm)
- Weight: 12 st 11 lb (81 kg)

Playing career^{1}
Years	Club	Games (Goals)
1930–1934	Melbourne	75 (267)
- ^{1} Playing statistics correct to the end of 1934.

George Francis Margitich (18 November 1908 – 17 January 1958) was an Australian rules footballer who played with Melbourne in the Victorian Football League (VFL) during the 1930s.

== Football ==
Margitich attended Rostrevor College and was a member of the 1st XVIII from the age of thirteen. In his final year at Rostrevor, Margitich captained the First XI cricket team. In 1927, he kicked 151 goals in eleven games, averaging almost 14 goals per game. In his five years representing Rostrevor's First XVIII football side he kicked over 400 goals.

Following Rostrevor, Margitich played for South Australian National Football League (SANFL) club South Adelaide. In 1929 he kicked 74 goals and was selected to tour Western Australia with the state team. Margitich was transferred by his employer (Vacuum Oil) to Victoria. Margitich then debuted for Melbourne in 1930 and kicked 73 goals, a then club record for most goals in a season. He topped their goalkicking again in 1931 and 1932 and managed 10 goals in a game three times in his career. The most he kicked was 12 against North Melbourne in 1931.

In 1935 he left Victoria to coach Swan Districts in Western Australia. While business commitments kept him away from football he had enough free time to be wicketkeeper for district cricket.

== Death ==
Margitich died suddenly at home on 17 January 1958. He was 49 years old.
