= Koltyn Tholstrup =

Australian rules footballer

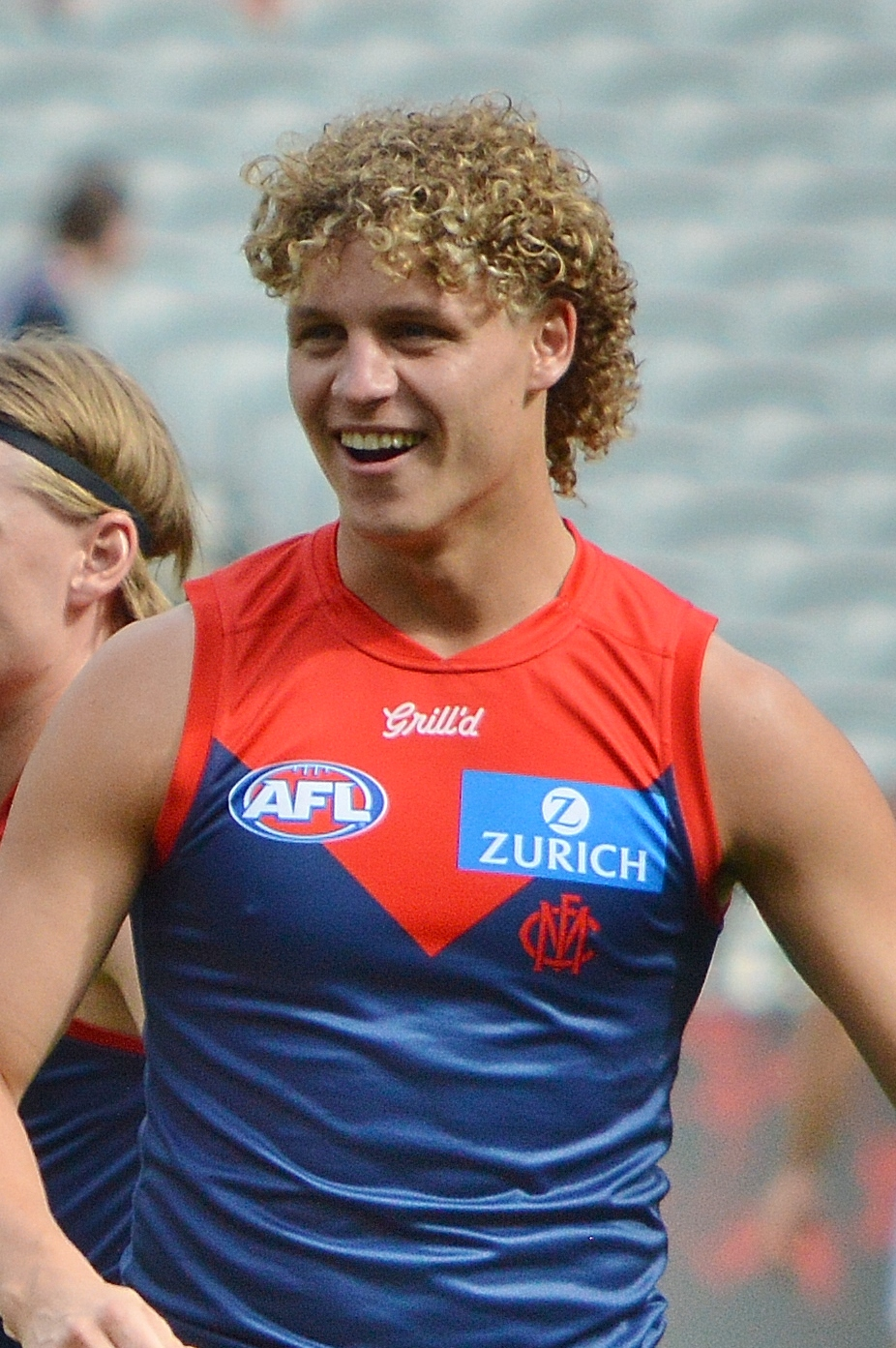
- Tholstrup in April 2025

Personal information
- Born: 28 June 2005 (age 21)
- Original team: Newtown Condingup Football Club
- Draft: No. 13, 2023 national draft
- Debut: Round 5, 2024, Melbourne vs. Brisbane Lions, at MCG
- Height: 186 cm (6 ft 1 in)
- Position: Defender

Club information
- Current club: Melbourne
- Number: 12

Playing career^{1}
Years	Club	Games (Goals)
2024–	Melbourne	40 (11)
- ^{1} Playing statistics correct to the end of round 22, 2026.

Career highlights
- Harold Ball Memorial Trophy: 2026

Koltyn Tholstrup (born 28 June 2005) is a professional Australian rules footballer playing for the Melbourne Football Club in the Australian Football League (AFL). A medium forward, he is 1.86 metres (6 ft 1 in) tall. He made his debut in the twenty-two point loss to Brisbane Lions at the Melbourne Cricket Ground in round 5 of the 2024 season.

== Statistics ==
Updated to the end of round 22, 2026.

Legend
G	Goals	K	Kicks	D	Disposals	T	Tackles
B	Behinds	H	Handballs	M	Marks

Season	Team	No.	Games	Totals							Averages (per game)							Votes
Season	Team	No.	Games	G	B	K	H	D	M	T	G	B	K	H	D	M	T	Votes
2024	Melbourne	39	10	5	5	69	48	117	24	36	0.5	0.5	6.9	4.8	11.7	2.4	3.6	0
2025	Melbourne	12	9	3	4	31	33	64	13	23	0.3	0.4	3.4	3.7	7.1	1.4	2.6	0
2026	Melbourne	12	21	3	3	226	140	366	82	31	0.1	0.1	10.8	6.7	17.4	3.9	1.5	0
Career			40	11	12	326	221	547	119	90	0.3	0.3	8.2	5.5	13.7	3.0	2.3	0
