= Peter O'Keefe (footballer) =

Australian rules footballer

Personal information
- Full name: Peter O'Keefe
- Born: 24 March 1956 (age 70)
- Original team: Seymour
- Height: 184 cm (6 ft 0 in)
- Weight: 81.5 kg (180 lb)

Playing career^{1}
Years	Club	Games (Goals)
1976–79	Melbourne	10 (1)
- ^{1} Playing statistics correct to the end of 1979.

Peter O'Keefe (born 24 March 1956) is a former Australian rules footballer who played with Melbourne in the Victorian Football League (VFL).
