= Dennis Jones (Australian footballer) =

Australian rules footballer and coach

Personal information
- Full name: Dennis Jones
- Born: 13 November 1936
- Died: 21 December 1999 (aged 63)
- Height: 183 cm (6 ft 0 in)
- Weight: 86 kg (190 lb)
- Positions: Half-back, ruckman

Playing career^{1}
Years	Club	Games (Goals)
1956–1960, 1962	Melbourne	59 (4)

Coaching career
Years	Club	Games (W–L–D)
1968–1971	Central District	
1973–1974	West Perth	
1978	Melbourne	22 (5–17–0)
- ^{1} Playing statistics correct to the end of 1978.

Dennis Jones (13 November 1936 – 19 December 1999) was an Australian rules footballer who played with Melbourne in the Victorian Football League (VFL). He then moved to South Australia where he coached Central Districts to the finals for the first time.

Jones, a half-back, made his senior VFL debut in 1956 and was a member of Melbourne's 1959 premiership side. He retired from the VFL aged 25, and in 1968 became the senior coach of the South Australian National Football League (SANFL) club Central District. Jones remained in that role for four seasons before moving to the Western Australian Football League (WAFL) to coach West Perth, and getting them to a Grand Final. In 1978 Jones rejoined Melbourne, where he had been appointed coach, but he could not prevent the team from finishing with the wooden spoon.
