= Wally Lock =

Australian rules footballer

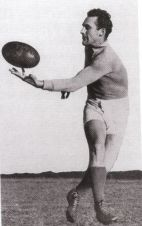

Personal information
- Full name: Walter Albert Lock
- Born: 22 January 1917; Maryborough, Victoria
- Died: 17 June 1992 (aged 75)
- Original team: Maryborough
- Height: 180 cm (5 ft 11 in)
- Weight: 83 kg (183 lb)
- Position: Half back flank

Playing career^{1}
| Years | Club | Games (Goals) |
| 1936–41, 1946–49 | Melbourne | 140 (14) |
- ^{1} Playing statistics correct to the end of 1949.

Career highlights
- VFL premiership: 1941; Keith 'Bluey' Truscott Medallist: 1947; Melbourne Team of the Century–interchange; Melbourne Hall of Fame

Walter Albert Lock (22 January 1917 – 17 June 1992) was an Australian rules footballer who played for Melbourne in the Victorian Football League (VFL).

== Family ==
The son of Walter "Paddy" Lock (1882–1951), and Mabel Rebecca Lock (1891–1965), née Eastman, Walter Albert Lock was born at Maryborough, Victoria on 22 January 1917.

He married Margaret Greenough Day (1921–2005) on 14 October 1944. They had four children.

== Cricket ==
He was a talented cricketer in the Maryborough and District Cricket Association.

== Football ==
Recruited from Maryborough, and granted a permit on 23 April 1936, Lock began his career with Melbourne as half forward flanker — according to Percy Beames, he was known as Melbourne's "Bunton" in his early years. — and went on to later play in the backline as a valuable defender.

"He was restricted to 13 games in his second season [1937] by a series of ankle injuries, as well as being bitten [in the back] by a horse while at work. In the 1939 pre-season he needed a tetanus injection after the nails of a boot stop punctured his skin." — Demonwiki.

Due to suspension, Lock did not play in Melbourne's 1939 premiership team. Due to an injury sustained in the 1940 preliminary final, he was unable to play in Melbourne's 1940 premiership. He played (at half-back flank) in Melbourne's 1941 premiership side — as one of the team's best players, with a performance described as "outstanding".

On his discharge from the Army in 1946, and aged 29, Lock resumed his football career.

He was Melbourne's best and fairest, and was named in the Sporting Life "Team of the Year" in 1947. Due to an injury sustained in the 1948 semi final, he did not play in Melbourne's premiership match that year, and was only able to play four games in 1949. He retired in the 1950 pre-season when he discovered that his knee was "not likely to respond to treatment".

== Military service ==
In 1942, Lock enlisted in the Australian Army to serve in World War II. He held the rank of corporal, served overseas in the 4th Field Ambulance, and was discharged on 4 January 1946.

== Legacy ==
Lock was a boyhood hero of Ron Barassi. Barassi described Lock as someone who "combined strength with guile and football intelligence" and "was dashing and played with flair".

=== Life membership (M.F.C.) ===
Lock was made a life member of the Melbourne Football Club in 1946.

=== Team of the Century (M.F.C.) ===
In 2000, he was named on the interchange bench in Melbourne's official "Team of the Century".

=== "150 Heroes" (M.F.C.) ===
In 2008, during the Melbourne Football Club's 150th anniversary celebrations, Lock's name was included in the list of the club's "150 heroes".

=== Hall of Fame (M.F.C.) ===
In 2013, he was inducted into Melbourne's "Hall of Fame".
