= Harry Davie =

Australian rules footballer

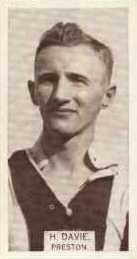

Personal information
- Full name: Henry John Davie
- Born: 22 May 1905
- Died: 17 March 1968 (aged 62); Sydney, Australia
- Original team: Melbourne Juniors
- Height: 169 cm (5 ft 7 in)
- Weight: 58 kg (128 lb)

Playing career^{1}
Years	Club	Games (Goals)
1924–1927	Melbourne	49 (160)
1928	Carlton	9 (26)
Total		58 (186)
- ^{1} Playing statistics correct to the end of 1928.

Henry James Davie (22 May 1905 – 17 March 1968) was an Australian rules footballer who played for Melbourne and Carlton in the Victorian Football League (VFL) during the 1920s.

Born in Fitzroy, Davie was very lightly built but could play in the key forward positions as well as in the pockets. He holds the record for most goals on debut by a Melbourne footballer, with a bag of six against Richmond when he played his first game in 1924.

In Melbourne's Round 14, encounter with Carlton the following season at Princes Park, Davie kicked 13 goals and 5 behinds. It remains the most ever goals kicked by an individual in a game at the ground and the equal most by a player against Carlton anywhere with both Tony Lockett and Tony Modra kicking 13 goals against Carlton in the 1990s. His haul was also a club record until 1947 when Fred Fanning bagged 18.

Davie twice kicked over 50 goals in a season and topped Melbourne's goalkicking in 1925 and 1927. He missed out on his club's 1926 premiership through injury.

He crossed to Carlton in 1927 and played there for a season before finishing his career in the Victorian Football Association (VFA) with Preston. He was often used as a centreman at Preston but also spent time up forward.
