= Peter Giles (footballer) =

Australian rules footballer

Personal information
- Full name: Peter Giles
- Born: 10 June 1958 (age 68)
- Original team: Sandringham
- Height: 188 cm (6 ft 2 in)
- Weight: 92 kg (203 lb)

Playing career^{1}
Years	Club	Games (Goals)
1979–1987	Melbourne	124 (32)
- ^{1} Playing statistics correct to the end of 1987.

Peter Giles (born 10 June 1958) is a former Australian rules footballer who played with Melbourne in the Victorian Football League (VFL).
