= Melbourne Football Club =

Australian rules football club

Names
- Full name: Melbourne Football Club Limited
- Nickname(s): AFL: Demons, Dees; Indigenous rounds: Narrm
- Former nickname(s): Redlegs, Fuchsias (prior to 1933)

2026 season
- After finals: 9th
- Home-and-away season: 7th
- Leading goalkicker: Jacob van Rooyen (42 goals)

Club details
- Founded: 1858; 168 years ago
- Colours: Navy Blue Red
- Competition: AFL: Men; AFLW: Women
- President: Steven Smith
- CEO: Dan Taylor
- Coach: AFL: Steven King; AFLW: Tom Wilson
- Captain(s): AFL: Max Gawn; AFLW: Kate Hore
- Premierships: VFL/AFL (13): 1900; 1926; 1939; 1940; 1941; 1948; 1955; 1956; 1957; 1959; 1960; 1964; 2021; AFLW (1); 2022 (S7); Reserves (12): 1931; 1932; 1933; 1934; 1935; 1939; 1949; 1956; 1969; 1970; 1984; 1993; Victorian (3): 1870; 1872; 1876
- Ground: AFL: Melbourne Cricket Ground (100,024); AFLW: Casey Fields (9,000)
- Training ground: AFL/AFLW: Gosch's Paddock, Casey Fields

Uniforms
Home	Away	Clash

Other information
- Official website: melbournefc.com.au

The Melbourne Football Club, nicknamed the Demons and commonly known as the Dees, is a professional Australian rules football club. The club competes in the Australian Football League (AFL), the highest level of Australian rules football and plays its home matches at the Melbourne Cricket Ground (MCG).

Established in 1858, Melbourne is the oldest Australian rules football club and is widely recognised as the world's oldest professional club of any football code. The club played a central role in the development of Australian rules football: in May 1859, Melbourne members drafted the first laws of the game which laid the foundation for the modern game's rules. Melbourne was subsequently a foundation member of the Victorian Football Association (VFA) in 1877 and in 1896, the Victorian Football League (VFL) which was renamed the AFL in 1990.

Melbourne has won 13 VFL/AFL premierships, placing it among the more successful clubs in the competition's history. Its most successful period came between 1939 and 1964, during which it won ten premierships, including three consecutive flags from 1939 to 1941 and five premierships in six seasons between 1955 and 1960. After winning the 1964 premiership, the club endured a 57-year premiership drought before claiming its 13th flag in 2021.

Melbourne was a foundation member of the AFL Women's league (AFLW) in 2017, and won its first AFLW premiership in 2022 season 7.

The club has a longstanding association with the Melbourne Cricket Club (MCC) and the MCG, and again became a sporting section of the MCC in 2009.

== History ==
=== 1858: Foundations ===
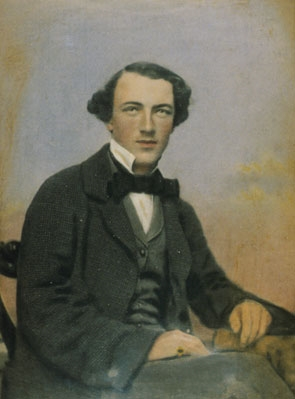
After promoting the formation of, and captaining an 1858 incarnation of the club, Tom Wills co-wrote Melbourne's first laws.

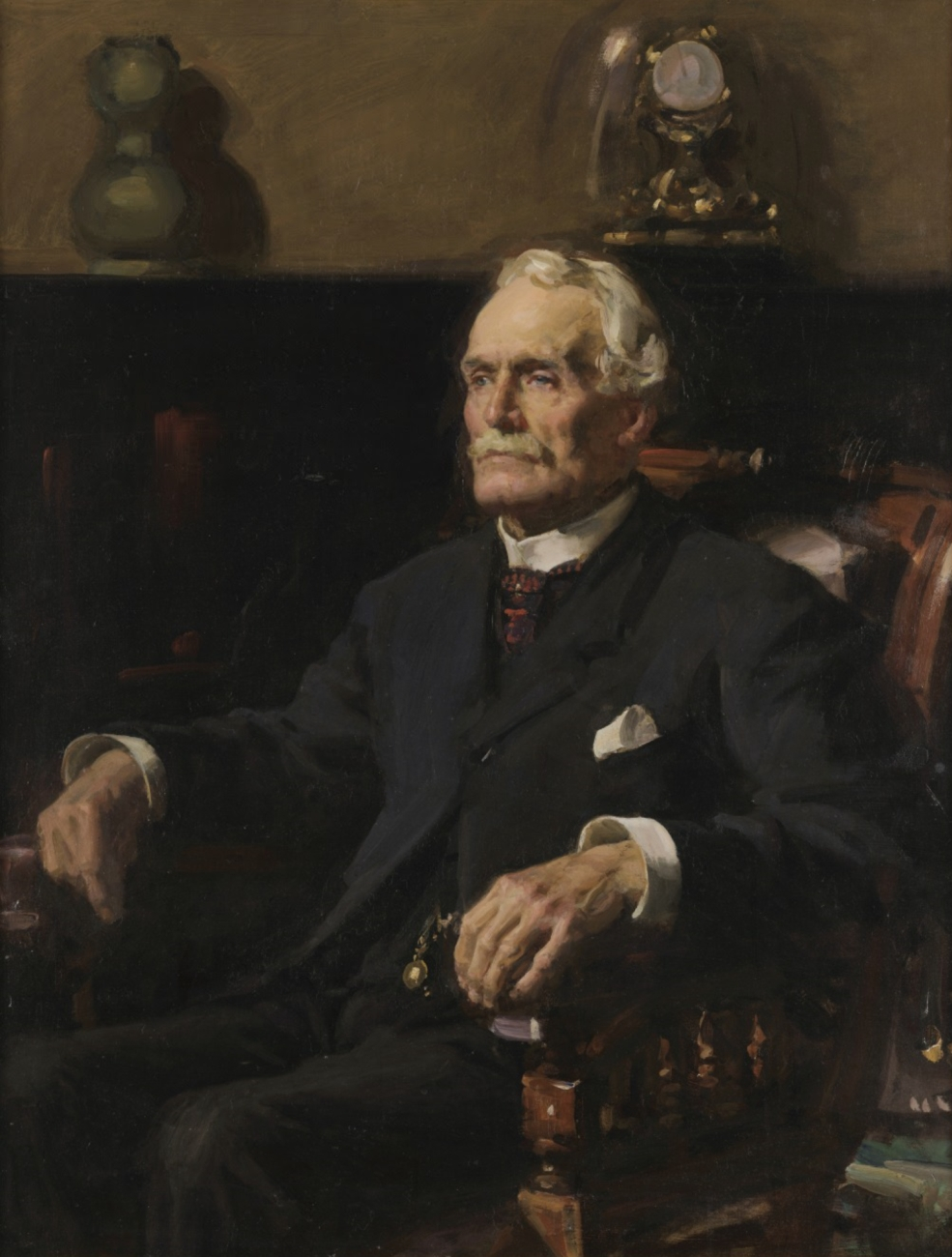
Wills' cousin H. C. A. Harrison captained Melbourne from 1861 to 1872, and later served as club president.

In the winter and spring of 1858, a loosely organised football team known as 'Melbourne' played in a series of scratch matches in the parklands outside the Melbourne Cricket Ground. This team was captained by Tom Wills, a prominent athlete and captain of the Victoria cricket team, who, on 10 July that year, had a letter of his published by the Melbourne-based Bell's Life in Victoria and Sporting Chronicle, in which he called for the formation of a "foot-ball club" with a "code of laws" to keep cricketers fit during winter, or alternatively to form a rifle club.

Other figures associated with this embryonic Melbourne side included Melbourne Cricket Club members Jerry Bryant, William Hammersley and J. B. Thompson, and teacher Thomas H. Smith. Whereas, fresh contemporary evidence from Bell's Life confirms the prominent role Jerry Bryant played in formation of the Melbourne Football Club at his Parade Hotel on the 21st May 1859.

It is possible that the first game played in 1858 involving the Melbourne team took place on or adjacent to the Melbourne Cricket Ground on 14 August following Bryant's call for 'all good kicks' to take part with a subsequent match held among the Melbourne Cricket Club members on 30 August. On 25 September 1858, Melbourne was challenged to a match by the South Yarra FC featuring 26 players a side, with Melbourne winning the game.

Although the club had not yet been established as a formal entity, nor its unique football rules, the year 1858 has long been recognised as being the foundation year of the Melbourne Football Club.

=== 1859–1876: establishment and early years ===
With the cricket season finished The Argus reported in early May 1859 that the membership of the "Melbourne Football Club" was growing 'owing, probably, to its being no longer confined to members of the Melbourne Cricket Club'. On 14 May the club held its first match of the year in the Richmond Paddock with two sides captained by Smith and Bryant, with Bryant's side kicking two goals for victory. A subsequent meeting was held to elect a Secretary, Treasurer and committee of five to administer the affairs of the club and to draft its rules, whilst an application to the MCC was made for use of the MCG on Wednesdays and Saturdays. Although most Melbourne players and officials were associated with the MCC, the football club was not initially allowed to use its ground, so matches were played on the fields at Yarra Park.

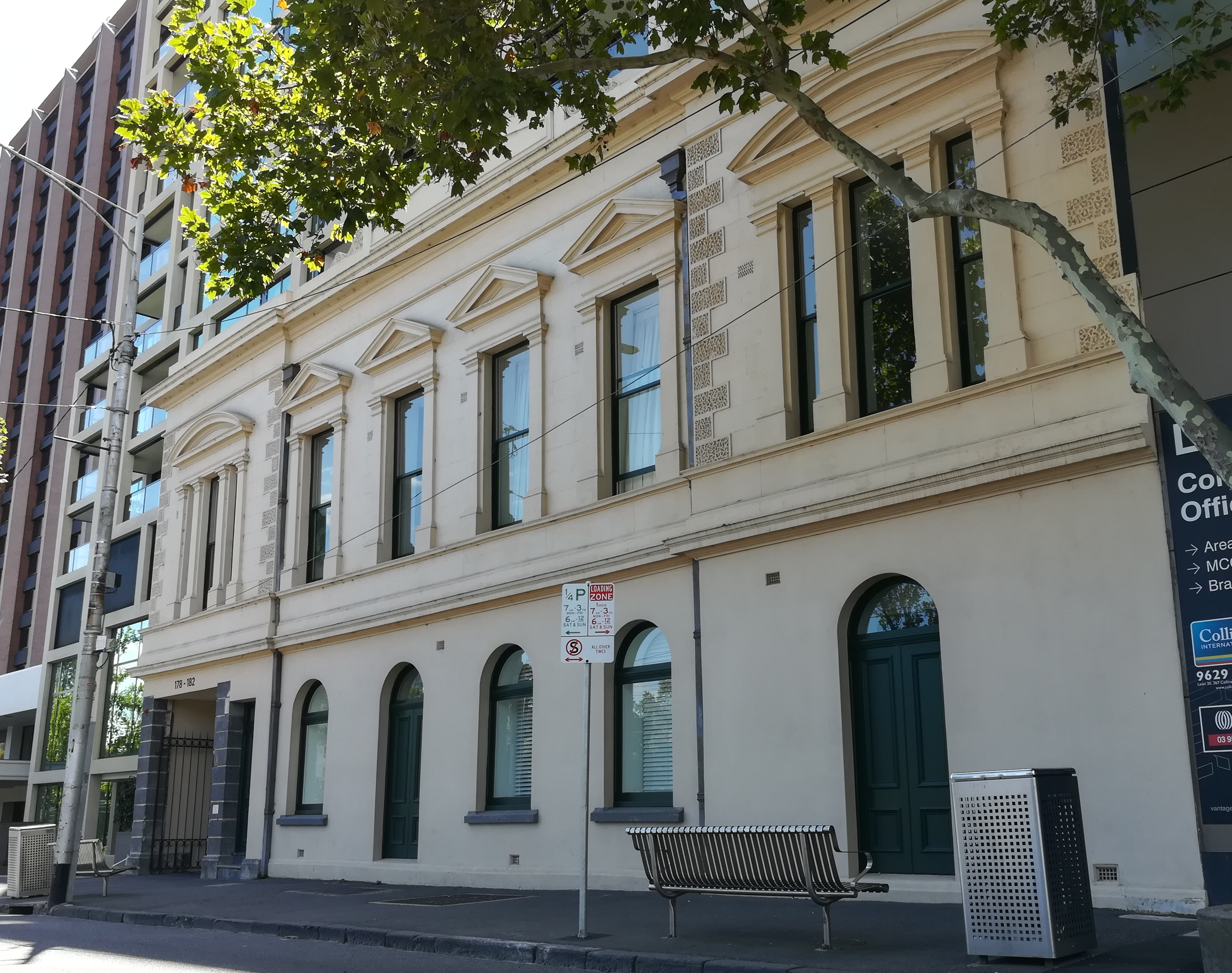
Former Parade Hotel near the MCG, where in 1859 the "Rules of the Melbourne Football Club" were drafted

On 17 and 21 May 1859, Wills, Hammersley, Thompson and Smith met near the MCG at the Parade Hotel, owned by Bryant, to draft "The Rules of the Melbourne Football Club". The resulting ten codified rules are the laws from which Australian rules football evolved.

In the early years of the club, football matches were conducted on a casual basis with no set fixture and teams often having to cancel engagements due to a lack of players. The first mention of an interclub match played under the new code was between Melbourne and South Yarra in July 1859, with Hammersley as Melbourne's inaugural captain. In 1860 Melbourne played its first match against the Geelong Football Club in Geelong with the match resulting in a draw.

In 1861, Melbourne participated in the Caledonian Society Challenge Cup, but lost the trophy to the Melbourne University Football Club. The club pushed for its rules to be the accepted rules, however many of the early suburban matches were played under compromised rules decided between the captains of the competing teams.

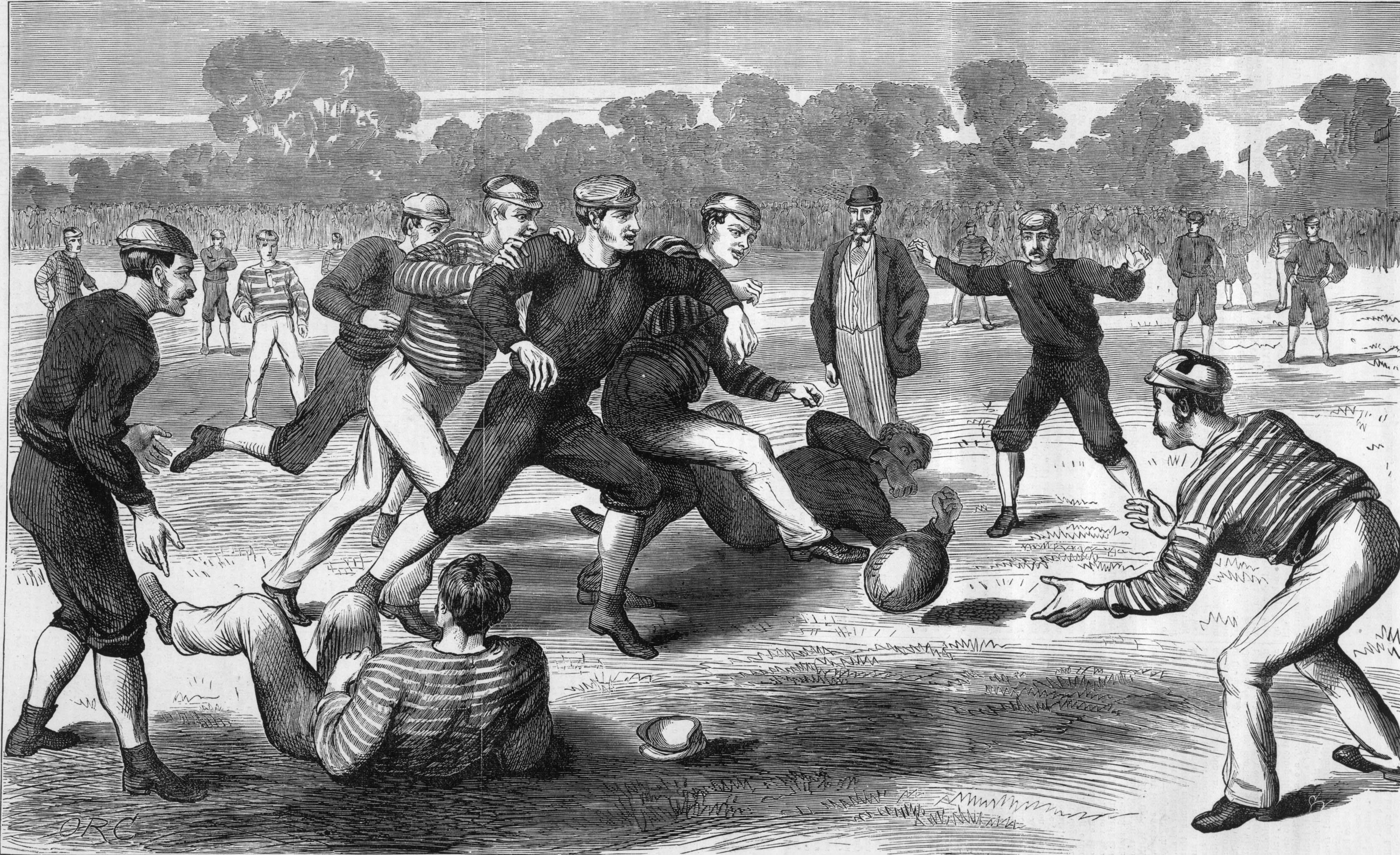
Melbourne playing in Yarra Park at the start of the 1874 season

By 1866 several other clubs had also adopted an updated version of Melbourne's rules, drafted at a meeting chaired by Wills' cousin, H. C. A. Harrison. Harrison was a key figure in the early years of the club; he often served as captain and, in later years, as president. Due to his popular reputation and administrative efforts, he was officially named "Father of Australian Football" in 1908, the year of the sport's golden jubilee. In 1866 the Melbourne club issued a challenge to the newly founded Sydney Football Club in the New South Wales capital, however the negotiations on the visit stalled.

During the 1870s, Melbourne fielded teams in the Seven Twenties and South Yarra Cup competitions.

=== 1877–1896: Victorian Football Association ===
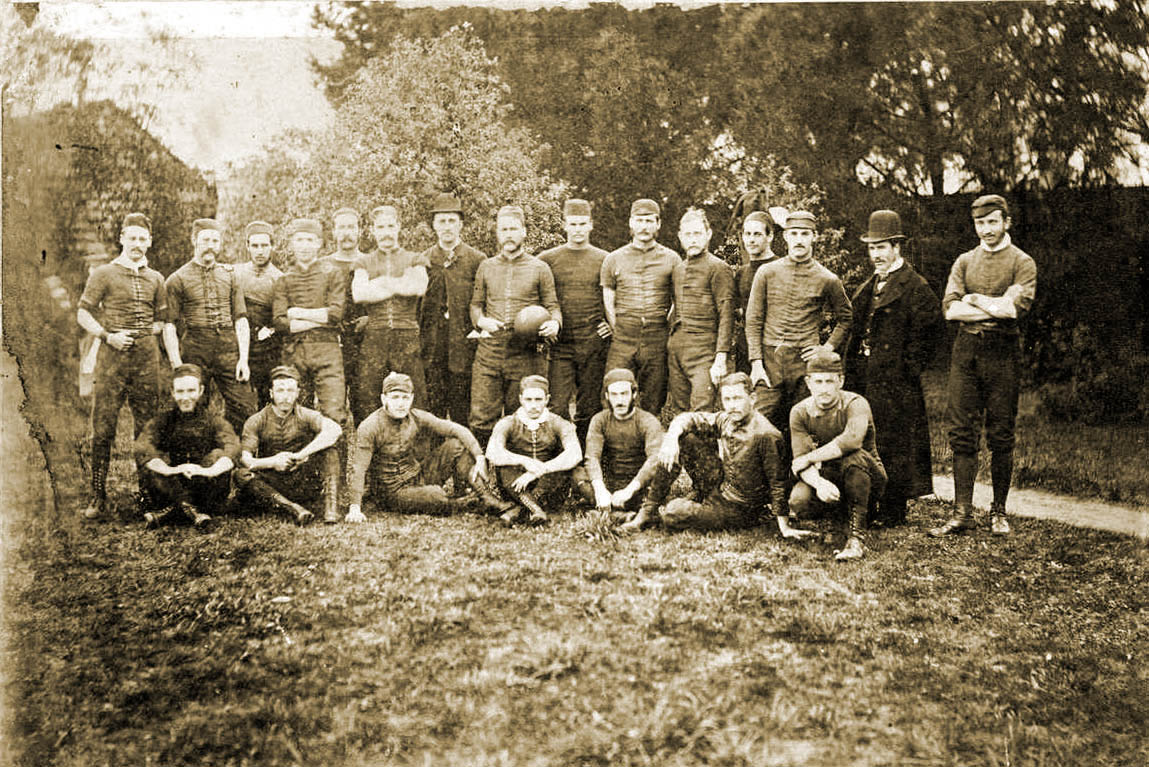
Melbourne side of 1879

In 1877, Melbourne became a founding member of the Victorian Football Association (VFA). During the same year the club took part in the first interstate football match involving a South Australian side, Victorian, defeating the home side 1–0. Melbourne never won a VFA premiership, although they were consistently one of the stronger teams in the competition, finishing as runners-up four times, to Carlton in 1877, Geelong in 1878 and twice to Essendon in 1893 and 1894.

On 9 July 1881 Melbourne played East Sydney in the first football game, of any code, to be played at the Sydney Cricket Ground. Melbourne won the game 2.22 (34) to 0.1 (1). The crowd for the game numbered 2500.

In 1884 Melbourne's stand at the MCG which catered for 3,000 spectators burned down precipitating a series of financial constraints for the club. With mounting debts, club officials running up unauthorised accounts, poor on-field form and players leaving to join other clubs, Melbourne's future was in serious jeopardy by 1888. It was proposed that the MCC intervene to provide assistance given the closeness of the two clubs and the fact that football matches generated significant gate revenue for the MCC.

At the end of the 1889 season, the MFC and MCC committees met and agreed to amalgamation of the two. The football club would become a section of the cricket club with the MCC handling the MFC's immediate and ongoing financial concerns. Melbourne's on-field prospects soon lifted finishing fourth on the ladder in 1892 and vying the Premiership in 1893. This was to be the beginning of a long and fruitful partnership that produced 12 VFL Premierships between 1900 and 1964.

=== 1897–1932: early years in the Victorian Football League ===
Chart of yearly ladder positions for Melbourne in VFL/AFL

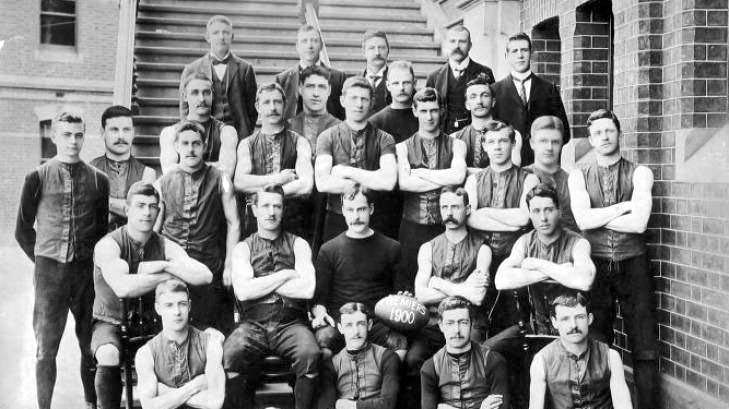
Melbourne team that won its first VFL premiership in 1900

In 1897, Melbourne joined other VFA powerhouse clubs Essendon, Collingwood, Fitzroy, Geelong, and South Melbourne to form the breakaway Victorian Football League with Carlton and St Kilda also joining. In the first season of the new competition, Jack Leith was the league's leading goalscorer while Fred McGinis emerged as a champion player and league identity being judged Champion of the Colony for the season. In 1900, McGinis helped take Melbourne to its first VFL premiership, defeating Fitzroy in a Grand Final upset at the East Melbourne Cricket Ground; and, in 1904, Vin Coutie kicked 39 goals to be the League's leading goalkicker. But, despite this success, including playing in the finals again in 1902, Melbourne's first decade of the 20th century was poor on-field, with the club taking out the Wooden Spoon in 1905 and 1906.

In the 1910s the team had adopted the nickname 'Fuchsias' alongside the pre-existing Redlegs name and in 1912 the club adopted a club song to the tune of 'You're A Grand Old Flag". Harry Brereton was the VFL leading goalscorer in the 1911 and 1912 season. During this time the club took pride in its policy of amateurism and when World War I broke out, the club strongly petitioned for the league being suspended to prevent fit professional footballers from joining the war effort. In 1916 the club refused to take part in the competition for three seasons, returning in 1919. 14 Melbourne players lost their lives in the conflict, including Arthur Mueller 'Joe' Pearce, Clifford Burge, Jack Doubleday, Desmond McDonald, Ralph Robertson, Percy Rodriguez and Alfred Williamson.

Melbourne had little success in the immediate post-war years having not played a final since 1915, taking out another Wooden Spoon in 1919. However, finals form would return with the team defeating Geelong and later losing to Collingwood in 1925. In 1926 Albert Chadwick captain-coached the team to its second league Premiership defeating Collingwood in the Grand Final. Melbourne's greatest player at this time was Ivor Warne-Smith, who in the Premiership year won the club's first Brownlow Medal. Warne-Smith went on to win a second Brownlow in 1928, a year in which Melbourne would play finals again. Chadwick and Warne-Smith would both go on to have influential administrative roles in the club's most successful period in the 1950s.

=== 1933–1964: dominant years ===
The Great Depression took a financial toll on the club with poor on-field performances and some players having the pressure of having to search for employment. Melbourne's fortunes were lifted however for the 1933 season when it lured Richmond's premiership winning coach Frank "Checker" Hughes and Richmond's secretary Percy Page to the club.

Hughes was a tough and disciplined coach inspiring the changing of the club's nickname from the Fuchsias to the Demons.

You are playing like a lot of flowers. Lift your heads and play like demons!

— Hughes during a speech to his players

Under Hughes' leadership, and with star players including captain Allan La Fontaine, rover Percy Beames, backman Jack Mueller and Norm Smith at full forward, the Demons played finals in 1936 and 1937, and became the third club after Carlton and Collingwood to win three successive premierships in 1939, 1940 and 1941.

Tragedy would fall on the club soon after with 11 players giving their lives whilst serving in World War 2. These players included premiership players Keith 'Bluey' Truscott, Harold Ball, Syd Anderson and Ron Barassi Sr, all for whom club awards have been dedicated to, with the club's Best and Fairest award named in honour of Truscott.

Hughes left the club at the end of the 1941 season but returned in 1945. The next year Don Cordner became the second Demon to win the Brownlow Medal with Melbourne reaching the grand final, losing to Essendon by a margin of 63 points. Fred Fanning was the VFL leading goal scorer in 1943, 1944, 1945 and 1947 when he also kicked the league record 18 goals in a match during the last game of the season (a record that still stands). In 1948, Melbourne met Essendon in a grand final rematch. The Bombers' inaccurate kicking of 7 goals and 27 behinds resulted in the first ever drawn VFL grand final. The Demons returned the next week to win its sixth premiership with Jack Mueller kicking six goals in the match. Hughes retired again as coach at the end of the season and after being denied the position by a single vote of the club's committee, Norm Smith moved to Fitzroy to take a position as captain-coach.

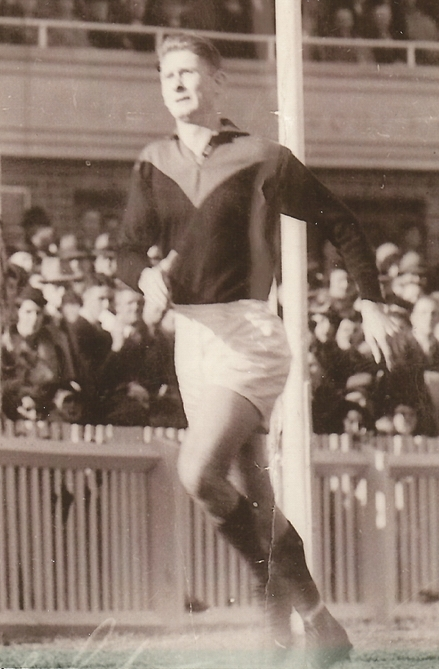
Demons great Norm Smith coached the club to six premierships

New coach Allan La Fontaine had limited success despite the Demons playing finals in 1950 and bringing talented new players into the club. After the Demons took out the Wooden Spoon in 1951, Smith returned to take up the coaching position in the 1952 season and set about forging a new team with future club champion Ron Barassi joining in 1953 under the newly created father-son rule. In 1954, the Demons made the Grand Final losing to a rampaging Footscray. In 1955 the Demons cemented their position as the best team in the league finishing top of the ladder and taking out the Premiership in the Grand Final against Collingwood. Melbourne became the only VFL team to win three premierships in succession twice by winning the 1956 and 1957 grand finals against Collingwood and Essendon. The Demons suffered a shock defeat to their rivals Collingwood in the 1958 grand final, but would regain the premiership following wins in the 1959 and 1960 grand finals against Essendon and Collingwood.

Despite playing in the finals series in 1961, 1962 and 1963, Melbourne failed to reach a grand final until 1964 when the Demons finished top of the ladder again. In one of the grand finals, Melbourne won its 12th VFL premiership in the dying seconds of the game against Collingwood with back-pocket player Neil Crompton kicking the winning goal.

After the 1954 Grand Final loss to Footscray, no team was able to score 100 points against the Demons until Collingwood in round 5 1963. The next team was Geelong with 110 in round 1 1964. and dominant period of any team in the VFL/AFL no other team has ever won 10 premierships in just 31 years.

=== 1965–1986: decades of disappointment ===
In one of the greatest shock moves in the VFL history, Ron Barassi transferred to Carlton as captain-coach for the 1965 season. Despite this, Melbourne were still the dominant team of the league, winning its first eight games in succession. After having lost just three games, the club's committee made the startling decision to sack Norm Smith as coach before its Round 13 fixture against North Melbourne. Hughes returned to coach the Demons in a losing game, while Melbourne identities, including Barassi took to the media to defend Smith. Smith was reinstated however the damage was done, the Demons would only win one more game and subsequently missed out on finals for the first time since 1953. Melbourne would not play in another finals series until 1987.

Smith coached two more seasons with Melbourne and a succession of coaches followed trying to reverse the Demons fortunes including John Beckwith (1968–70), Ian Ridley (1971–73), Bob Skilton (1974–77) and Dennis Jones (1978). Melbourne languished near the bottom of the ladder throughout the late 1960s and 1970s, including three wooden spoons in 1969, 1974 and 1978. Despite possessing gifted players including Robert Flower and Greg Wells, the introduction of country zoning and poor management hampered the club's fortunes. Melbourne tried to supplement its list by recruiting older players from successful teams including Carl Diterich who played in two separate engagements with the Demons, the first between 1973 and 1975 and then serving as captain-coach in 1979 and 1980.

Melbourne's 1980s shield logo

In an effort to attract more members and to improve the club's finances the club legally separated from the MCC, becoming a public company. In 1981, under the chairmanship of Sir Billy Snedden, and with a public campaign backed by radio broadcaster Derryn Hinch, Ron Barassi returned to Melbourne as coach and immediately appointed Robert Flower as captain. Barassi set about implementing a 5-year plan for the Demons to win a Premiership, however the Demons finished 1981 with the wooden spoon after winning only one game. Recruits Brian Wilson from Footscray and Peter Moore from Collingwood would win the club's 4th and 5th Brownlow Medals in 1982 and 1984. However, despite sound recruiting, Barassi was unable to take the Demons to an elusive finals series and John Northey took up the coaching position in 1986.

=== 1987–2006: rollercoaster years ===
Melbourne would finally make the finals in 1987 in dramatic fashion needing to beat Footscray at the Western Oval and requiring Geelong to lose to Hawthorn. The Demons beat the Bulldogs by two goals with the Hawks beating the Cats by three points in the dying seconds of the game. Both matches took place at the same time, with the Melbourne fans cheering towards the end of the game when news came through of the Hawks win. Melbourne cruised into the Preliminary Final defeating North Melbourne by 118 points and Sydney by 76 points. In Robert Flower's last game, the Demons lead the Hawks by 4 points at the final siren, though Hawthorn's Gary Buckenara had a free kick 55 metres out. Melbourne Irish recruit Jim Stynes ran across the mark and incurred a 15-metre penalty, bringing Buckenara close enough to kick the winning goal after the siren. The Demons would try to exact revenge on the Hawks in the 1988 Grand Final but were trounced by 96 points.

From 1987 to 1991, Melbourne had five positive win–loss differentials in successive seasons which the club had not been able to achieve since the 1950s. Thereafter things went downhill for Northey, although Jim Stynes won the Brownlow in 1991. In 1992, the club finished 11th, and Northey was replaced by Neil Balme as coach. Balme coached Melbourne into the finals in 1994, but a last game loss to Brisbane saw them drop out of the top-eight in 1995, and the club lingered at or near the bottom of the ladder for most of the 1996 season.

By 1996, the club was also in dire financial straits. The club's board led by past club champion Ian Ridley as president decided on the desperate step of a merger with Hawthorn. In the ensuing weeks, a passionate debate was fought between pro and anti-merger supporters. In the first few days of this debate, lifelong supporters Mark and Anthony Jenkins met with coterie member George Zagon to form the Demon Alternative – an anti-merger group that was to significantly impact on the plans of the incumbent board. Former player and politician Brian Dixon and Rabbi Joseph Gutnick became the prominent leaders of the Demon Alternative group. The group quickly organised itself into a credible option for Melbourne supporters; however given the support of the AFL and other factors, when the merger issue was put to a vote, a majority of Melbourne members supported the board. In a meeting on the opposite side of town, Hawthorn members rejected their board's proposal and eventually the merger was defeated.

Gutnick and Mark Jenkins were co-opted onto the club's board in the aftermath with Gutnick later being voted in as president. He put $3 million of his own money into the club, and sacked Balme as coach midway through the 1997 season. In 1998, under new coach Neale Daniher, the club spent most of the season in the top eight and beat the eventual premiers Adelaide in the Qualifying Final. Melbourne also eliminated St Kilda, but lost to North Melbourne in the Preliminary Final. In 1999 Melbourne finished in the bottom three.

In an exciting finish to the 2000 season, Melbourne stormed its way into the Grand Final, but were convincingly beaten by ladder leaders Essendon. Melbourne missed out on finals in 2001 finishing 11th, but would finish sixth in 2002 to eventually lose its semi-final to Adelaide at the MCG in a controversial ‘away’ game, only played in Melbourne due to the AFL's contractual obligations with the MCG. Captain David Neitz would play his best season winning the Best and Fairest award and winning the club's first Coleman Medal as the league's leading goalscorer kicking 75 goals. Gutnick was replaced by Gabriel Szondy as president at the end of the year winning 65% of the members' vote.

In 2003, Melbourne plunged into new on and off-field crises, winning only five games for the year and posting a $1 million loss. Szondy resigned as president and it seemed that Daniher's tenure as coach was under threat. Melbourne played finals again in 2004. In a seesawing Elimination Final, the Demons lost to Essendon by less than a goal. During the 2004 post-season, Melbourne player Troy Broadbridge was killed in the 2004 Boxing Day tsunami, when he was swept off Phi Phi island in Thailand. His body was found on 3 January 2005, and brought home. A funeral was held on 20 January 2005 in recognition to the No. 20 guernsey he wore during his playing days. During the 2005 off-season, the whole team travelled to the island in which Broadbridge was killed to build a new school for those struck by the tsunami. The No.20 jumper was then rested for two years.

Melbourne finished the 2005 season in seventh position but lost the elimination final to Geelong by 55 points. In 2006, after a slow start, Melbourne again finished the season in seventh position. After defeating St Kilda in the second Elimination Final by 18 points the season ended the following week when Fremantle beat the Demons by 28 points. Daniher had become the club's the second longest-serving coach while Neitz became Melbourne's all-time leading goal-kicker on 19 May, surpassing Norm Smith's previous record of 546 goals. Two weeks later, he broke Robert Flower's long standing record of 272 games, making him the longest serving Demon in history.

=== 2007–2017: years of struggle ===
At the start of the 2007 AFL season, Melbourne were thought by many pundits to be contenders for the Premiership, but injuries to key players across the team resulted in the Demons losing its opening nine matches. Daniher resigned as coach mid-season with Mark Riley appointed as caretaker coach. Late in the season, David Neitz became the first Melbourne player to play 300 games.

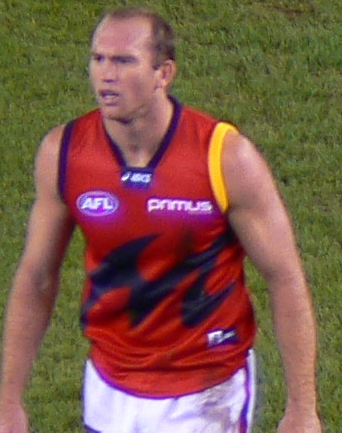
David Neitz retired as the club's games and goals record holder, along with being the longest serving captain

Dean Bailey was appointed coach for the 2008 season, however Melbourne lost their first six matches, before breaking through with a record comeback win in round seven against Fremantle. Melbourne finished the season poorly finishing last on the ladder, taking out its first Wooden Spoon since 1997.

Off field, the club remained in turmoil. In its 150th anniversary year club CEO Steve Harris resigned and was replaced by former Wimbledon tennis champion Paul McNamee in early 2008. Club President Paul Gardner also resigned mid-season making way for former club champion Jim Stynes who inherited a $4.5 million debt. Stynes immediately got to work and was instrumental in Melbourne's ‘Debt Demolition’ campaign held in a Kensington warehouse on 5 August. More than $1.3 million was raised on the night, with more than $3 million pledged to the cause. The Stynes' board sacked McNamee after just four months following criticism of him holidaying in Wimbledon to compete in a legends match. New club CEO Cameron Schwab declared that it required urgent AFL assistance to continue, requesting additional funding to its special annual distribution. In December, a fallout in negotiations between the Melbourne Cricket Club resulted in the MCC not committing an expected $2 million to the club and Schwab declared that the club's immediate future was in doubt. This doubt was quickly put to bed when the AFL and MCC finalised negotiations. The AFL committed $1 million to the club in 2009, with the MCC matching the AFL contribution.

Melbourne endured another poor season in 2009, winning just four matches to claim back-to-back Wooden Spoons. The year was made worse in July when Jim Stynes revealed he was fighting cancer. He temporarily stood down, with vice-chairman Don McLardy stepping up in his absence. In 2010 the club's on-field fortunes lifted, as they finished the season 12th on the ladder.

The club's 2011 season took a dramatic turn when the Demons suffered its second greatest loss in league history, going down to Geelong at Kardinia Park in round 19 by 186 points. Bailey was immediately sacked as coach with former club captain Todd Viney coaching the remaining games to finish 13th on the ladder. In August the club announced that its goal of wiping out the club's debt had finally been achieved and new coach Mark Neeld was announced in September.

In 2012 Jim Stynes retired as president, with vice-president Don McLardy stepping up to take the reins. Tragically, on March 20, Stynes’ long fight with cancer came to an end. He was given a state funeral, given his remarkable legacy on and off the field. The AFL investigated Melbourne's 2009 season in August, following comments made by former Demon and Carlton player, Brock McLean, that the club had not been trying to win. See: Melbourne Football Club tanking scandal

In 2013, Melbourne managed just one win from its first 11 games and Neeld was sacked as coach in Round 17 with assistant coach Neil Craig being appointed caretaker. This was precipitated by the departures of CEO Schwab and President McLardy. In September the club announced Sydney premiership coach Paul Roos signed a two-year deal to coach the Demons, with the option of a third year.

Paul Roos' first year in his tenure as the Demons' coach saw an improvement from their 2013 season, with the Demons doubling their win tally. Under Roos, the club continued to steadily improve winning 7 games in 2015 and key forward Jesse Hogan won Melbourne's second AFL Rising Star award. Roos left Melbourne after another improved season in 2016 with assistant coach Simon Goodwin taking over in a planned succession.

Melbourne made history in 2017, competing as one of the eight foundation clubs in the inaugural AFL Women's competition. Led by captain Daisy Pearce and coach Mick Stinear, Melbourne took on the Brisbane Lions in the first game of the new league at Casey Fields.

At the end of the 2018 season Melbourne finished in fifth place on the ladder reaching the finals series for the first time since 2006. The Demons advanced to an eventual Preliminary final defeat to West Coast after defeating Geelong and Hawthorn. Melbourne's success could not be maintained in 2019 with the Demons finishing 17th on the ladder. In the shortened 2020 season interrupted by the COVID-19 pandemic, Melbourne would finish ninth on the Ladder winning nine and losing eight games.

=== 2021: premiership success after 57 years ===
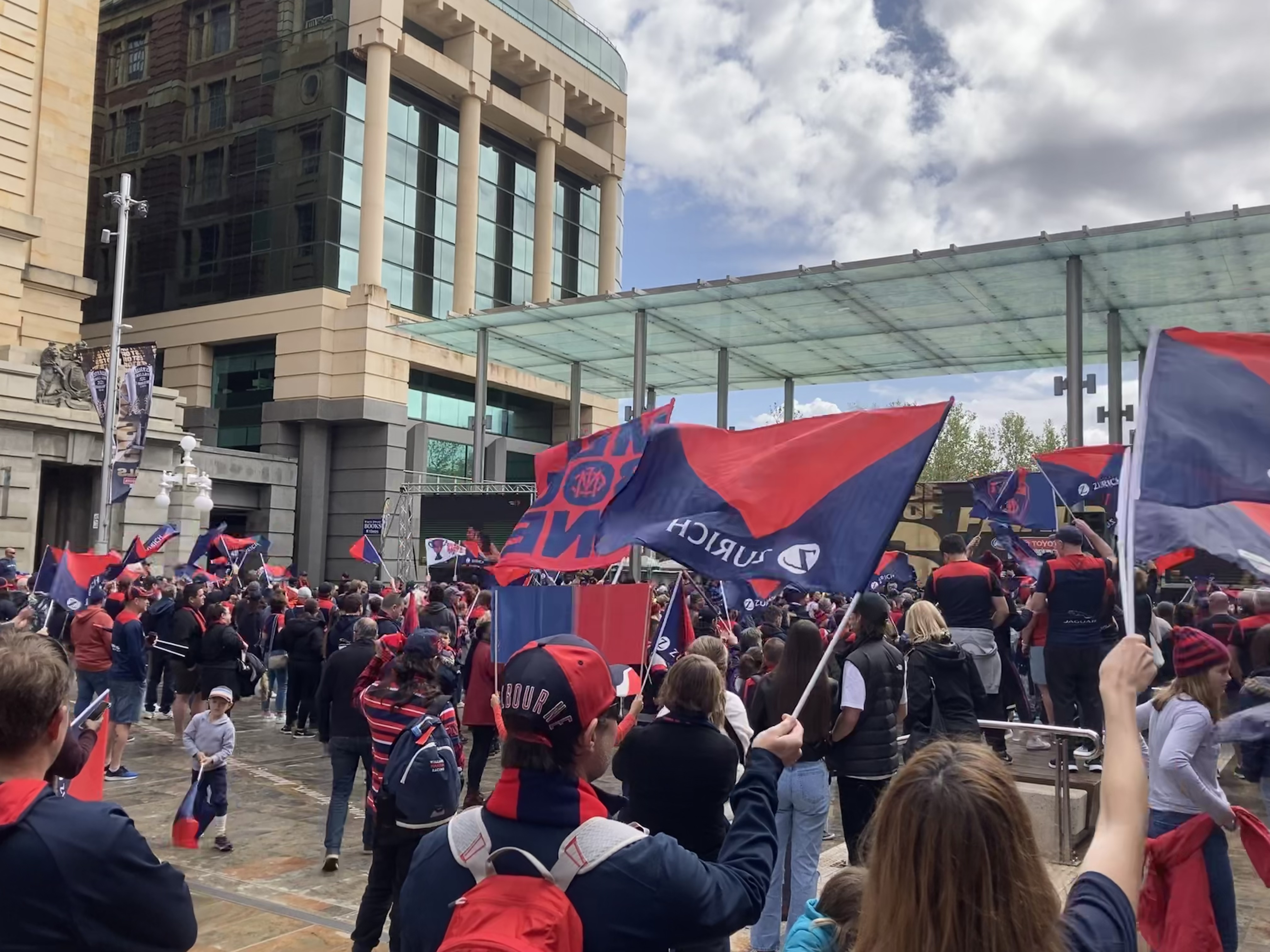
Demons fans celebrate at Forrest Place in Perth following Melbourne's 2021 premiership win the previous day over the Western Bulldogs at Optus Stadium

Melbourne's victory over North Melbourne in Round 7 of the 2021 season put them on the top of the ladder for the first time since the third round of 2005. They won their first nine matches of a season for the first time since 1956. Melbourne's win over West Coast in Round 21 put them at the top of the ladder again and secured their first double chance in a finals series since the 2000 season. Their next win against Adelaide equalled their most wins in a season from 1956. With captain Max Gawn kicking a goal after the siren in the Round 23 match against Geelong, Melbourne finished the season as minor premiers for the first time since 1964. After defeating Brisbane in a qualifying final at the Adelaide Oval and Geelong in a preliminary final at Optus Stadium, the Demons reached their first grand final since 2000. On 25 September, Melbourne won its 13th VFL/AFL premiership, defeating the Western Bulldogs by 74 points in the grand final at Optus Stadium in Perth; it was their first premiership since their 1964 victory against Collingwood. Christian Petracca was unanimously judged as best on the ground, winning the club's first Norm Smith Medal.

2021 AFL Grand Final	G	B	Total
Melbourne	21	14	140
Western Bulldogs	10	6	66
Venue: Perth Stadium	Crowd: 61,118

=== 2022–present ===
Melbourne's premiership defence began with 10 straight victories, increasing their streak from last year to 17, before suffering three losses on the bounce to fellow finalists Fremantle, Sydney and Collingwood. The Demons’ form in the second half of the 2022 season was inconsistent, but the reigning premiers emphatically secured a spot in the top four after a comfortable 58-point victory over Brisbane in the final round. The Demons finished second with a win–loss record of 16 wins and six losses, but came undone in the finals, bowing out in straight sets after losing to Sydney and Brisbane in the qualifying and semi final respectively.

Melbourne finished fourth on the ladder in 2023. Their season ended in week two of the finals, losing to Collingwood and Carlton in the qualifying and semi final respectively, becoming the first team to suffer consecutive straight sets exits in two seasons under the current AFL finals system.

Melbourne did not make the finals in 2024 and with continued poor performance in 2025, the club sacked coach Simon Goodwin with three rounds remaining in the season. Senior assistant Troy Chaplin was named as caretaker coach for the last three rounds. In September, former Geelong and St Kilda player Steven King was appointed as coach.

Melbourne defied expectations in King’s first season as senior coach. The Demons returned to finals football in 2026 after an outstanding 15–8 season, finishing seventh. Captain Max Gawn was awarded a record ninth All-Australian honour, the most of any AFL player. A final round loss to the Western Bulldogs forced the Demons into the AFL’s first ever wildcard round, where they were eliminated after a 19-point loss to Carlton.

== Club symbols ==
=== Colours ===
In one of the first practice matches between Melbourne teammates in 1859, both red and blue were worn and these colours quickly became associated with the Melbourne Football Club, although they were not used as part of the team's uniform.

In 1872, club member Larry Bell brought some red stockings back from England which were teemed with blue knickerbockers and jerseys and red caps. It is at this time that the team became known as the 'Redlegs'. Bell also brought back with him blue stockings which were reputedly given to the Carlton Football Club.

=== Uniform ===
In the early days of Australian football, players would wear whatever sporting clothing they had. As most of its players were members of the Melbourne Cricket Club, it quickly became the trend for Melbourne players to wear predominantly white clothes, which gave rise to the team being called the 'Invincible Whites'. For a brief period in 1861 and 1862, the club adopted magenta flannel shirts, but these were soon abandoned.

From 1872, a more standardised uniform was adopted, although it remained common for footballers to wear a mismatch of uniforms. Most footballers had dispensed with wearing cricket whites and were now choosing to wear woollen navy guernseys which were more suitable for winter play. The Melbourne team distinguished itself with red socks and a red cap. A canvas lace up guernsey was introduced in 1884 which featured a red leather strip down the middle and was worn by players up until 1915. In 1906, some players wore a navy woollen guernsey with a small red yoke around the neck. When Melbourne re-entered the competition for the 1919 season, a standardised uniform was used with a red V on a navy jumper. In 1925, the V was made smaller and raised to the collar with a red horizontal band added to the waist.

The current club jumper of a red V-shaped yoke on a navy background was first adopted in 1935, and apart from very slight variations over the years, and a period in which royal blue was used between 1975 and 1986 due to the introduction of colour television, the jumper has remained the same.

The Melbourne clash strip, new in 2018, consists of a retro-inspired home strip of royal blue with a red yoke, including white shorts as worn between 1975 and 1986. The alternate away strip is the same as the home strip, with the difference being the back entirely in red to allow the club to wear a non-white alternate strip.

New Balance have manufactured Melbourne's on- and off-field apparel since 2011.

==== Uniform evolution ====
Throughout its history, Melbourne has had different guernsey designs, as follows:

1858–61 & 1863–71	1861–62	1872–83	1884–1915	1905–15

1919–24	1925–34	1935–74	1975–86	1987–present

=== Mascot ===
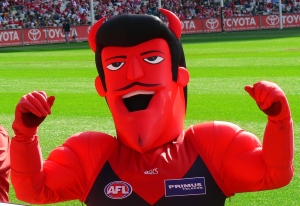
Ronald Deeman – Melbourne Football Club's mascot, pictured at Melbourne's home ground, the MCG.

In 1933, Melbourne was beginning to rebuild its side and abandoned the name 'Fuchsias' for a more ferocious title—the 'Demons'. This was inspired by then coach Frank "Checker" Hughes reportedly saying to the players in a game to 'lift up your heads and play like demons!'. Over the years, the club has used various iterations of demons as club mascots. This includes Ronald Deeman from the AFL Mascot Manor franchise.

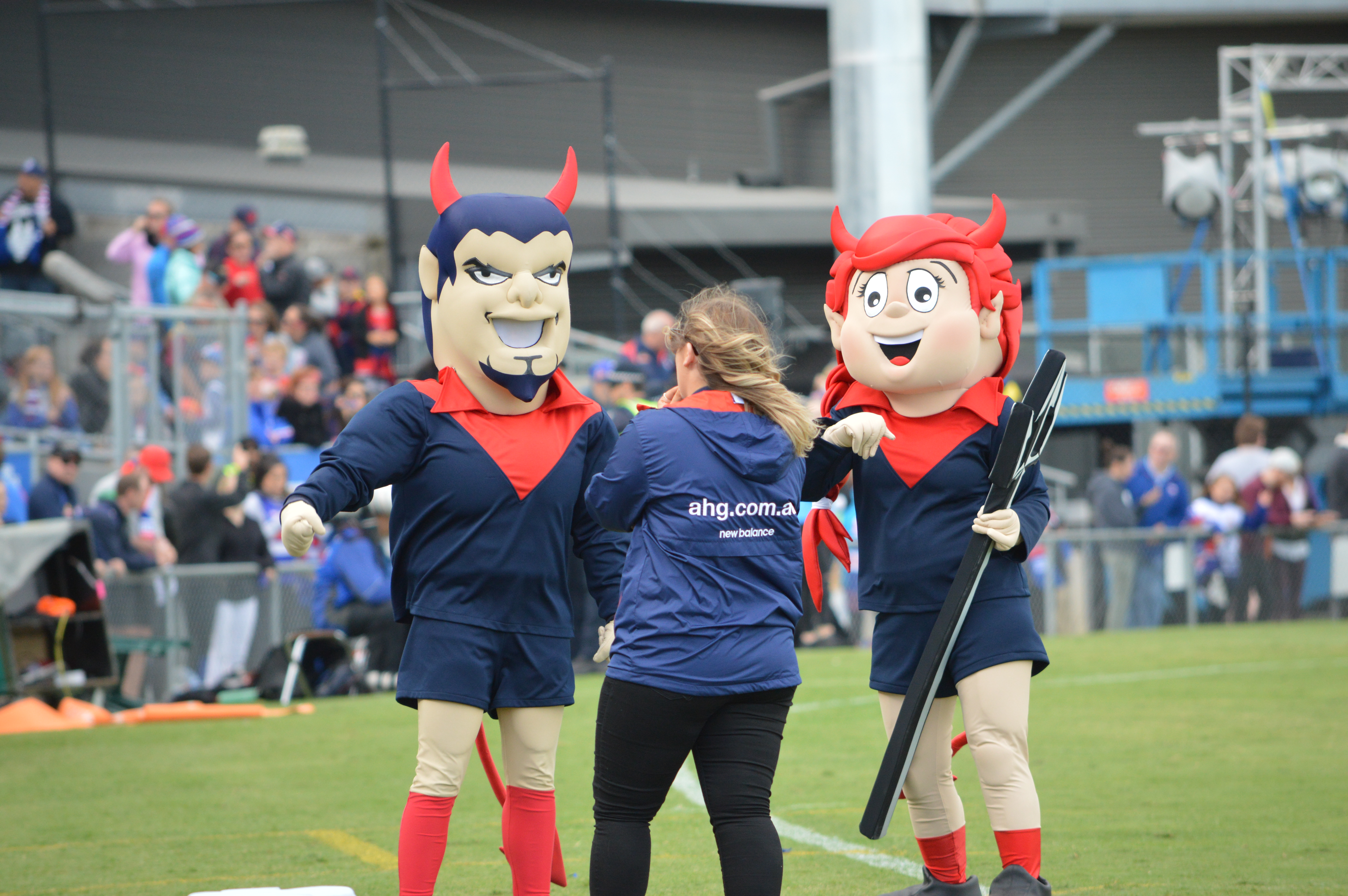
Checker and Daisy in February 2017

The current club mascots are Chuck, Checker, Flash, Daisy and Cheeky. Chuck is named after legendary coach Frank "Checker" Hughes; Daisy is named after the inaugural captain of the women's team, Daisy Pearce; and Flash is named after the 2009 Keith "Bluey" Truscott Medallist, Aaron Davey.

=== Song ===
The official Melbourne Football Club song is called "It's a Grand Old Flag" (sung to the tune of George M. Cohan's 1906 song "You're a Grand Old Flag"). The song was first adopted by the club in 1912. The Demons primarily repeat the first verse of the song.

It's a grand old flag, it's a high-flying flag,

It's the emblem for me and for you;

It's the emblem of the team we love,

The team of the Red and the Blue.

Every heart beats true for the Red and the Blue,

And we sing this song to you:

Should old acquaintance be forgot,

Keep your eye on the Red and the Blue.

A second verse was reputedly written by club champion Keith "Bluey" Truscott in 1940, referencing the club's 1939 and 1926 VFL premiership titles. The club resurrected the original second verse for the 2011 season.

Oh, the team played fine in the year Thirty-nine,

We’re the Demons that no one can lick;

And you'll find us there at the final bell,

With the spirit of Twenty-six.

Every heart beats true, for the Red and the Blue,

And we sing this song to you:

Should old acquaintance be forgot,

Keep your eye on the Red and the Blue.

=== Sponsorship ===
Year	Kit Manufacturer	Major Sponsor	Shorts Sponsor	Bottom Back Sponsor	Top Back Sponsor
1978–83	-	Mayne Nickless	-	-	-
1984	-	Hertz	-	-	-
1985–91	-	Drake International	-	-	-
1992	-	Snowy Mountain	-	-	-
1993	-	Pioneer Homes	-	-	-
1994	-	Tooheys Blue Demons	Blue	Tooheys	-
1995–97	-	Tooheys	Metway Bank	Tooheys	-
1998	Canterbury	LG	Tooheys Victoria	LG Electronics	-
1999	Canterbury	LG	Hahn	LG Electronics	-
2000	Fila	LG	Hahn	LG Electronics	-
2001–02	Fila	LG	Tooheys New	LG Electronics	-
2003	Asics	LG	Subway	LG Electronics	-
2004	Asics	iPrimus	Subway	Primus Telecom	-
2005–06	Asics	Primus Telecom	Red Energy	Primus Telecom	-
2007	Asics	Primus Telecom	The Age	Primus Telecom	-
2008	Reebok	Primus Telecom	The Age	Primus Telecom	-
2009	Reebok	Hankook	The Age	Kaspersky Lab	-
2010	Reebok	Hankook	Volvo	Kaspersky Lab	-
2011	New Balance	Hankook	Metro Solar	Kaspersky Lab	-
2012	New Balance	Webjet	Metro Solar	Opel	-
2013	New Balance	Webjet	-	Opel	-
2014–16	New Balance	AHG	NT	AHG	-
2017	New Balance	AHG	IG	iSelect	-
2018	New Balance	Zurich	IG	iSelect	-
2019	New Balance	Zurich	Johnnie Walker	Jaguar Cars	-
2020	New Balance	Zurich	Hertz	Jaguar Cars	Zurich
2021–	New Balance	Zurich	Hertz	Jaguar Cars	Beyond Bank

== Home and training grounds ==
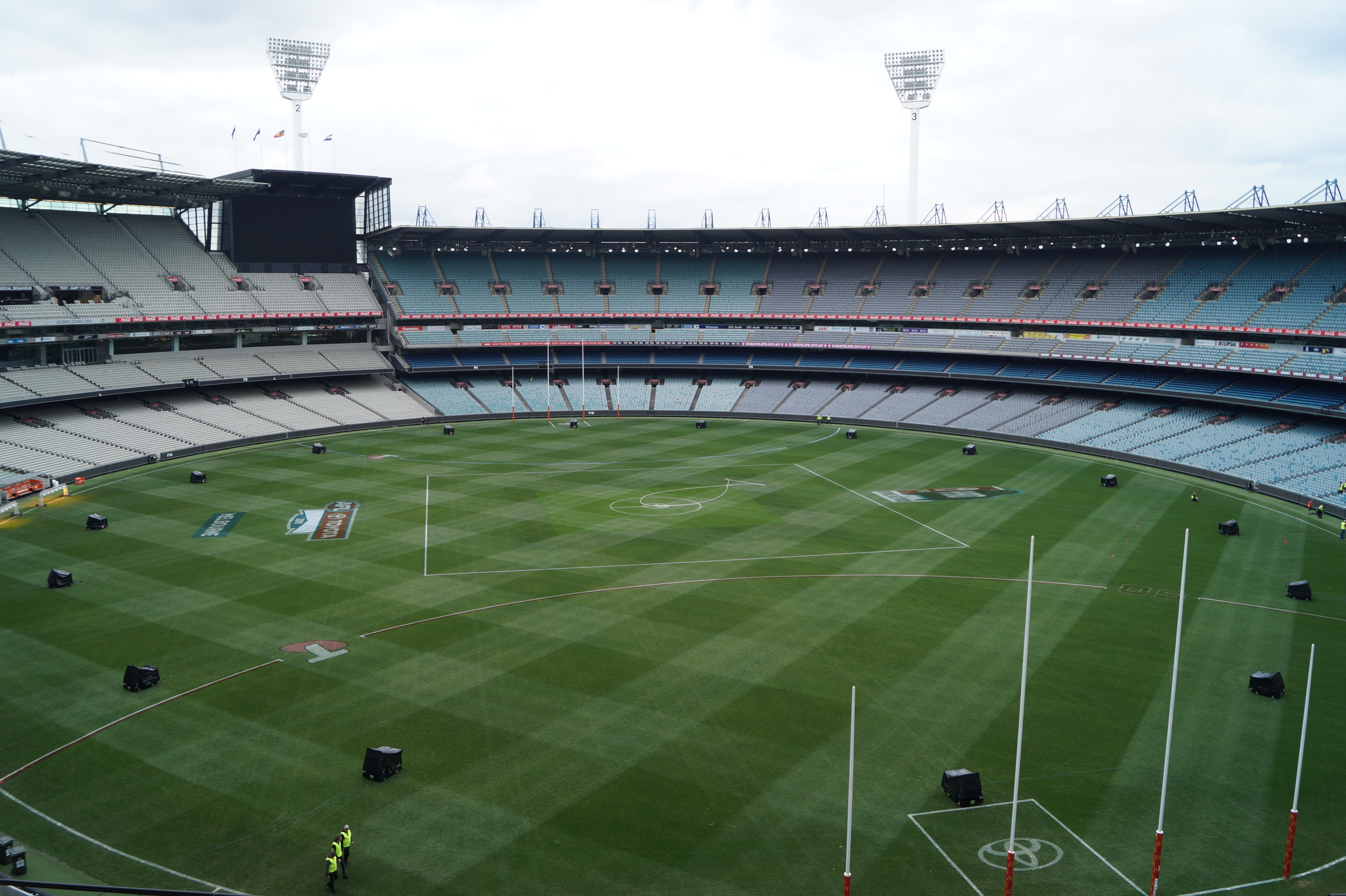
Melbourne Cricket Ground, the club's home venue for AFL matches

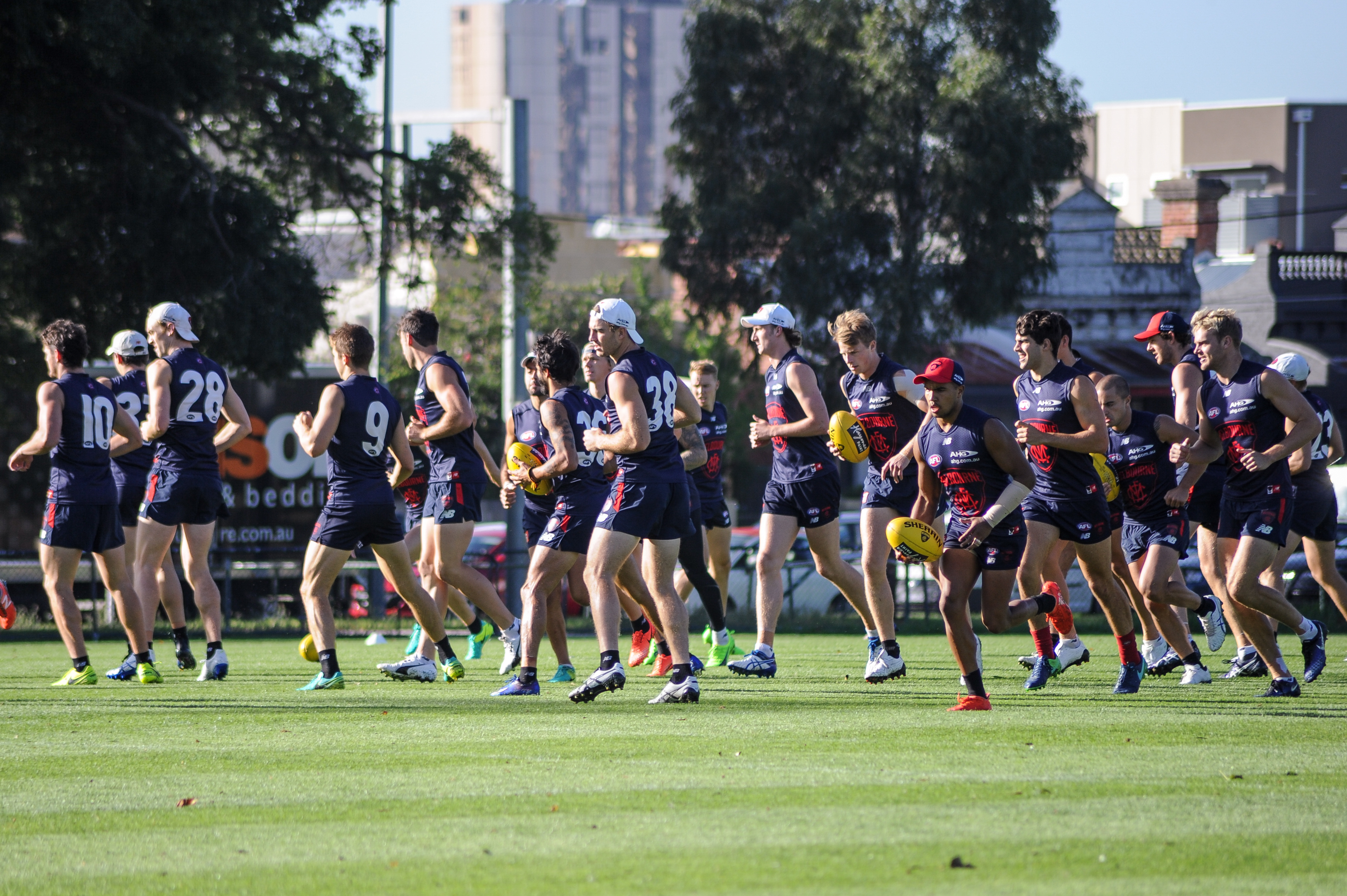
Players training at Goschs Paddock, the club's main training ground in 2017

Melbourne's home ground has been the Melbourne Cricket Ground (MCG) since 1889. From that time to 1980, the team was part of the Melbourne Cricket Club's sporting sections. The MCC operates and partially owns the MCG. The two clubs severed ties in 1980, though restored the relationship in 2009. The club trained on the MCG until 1985, at which point they shifted to the Junction Oval in St Kilda, which served as the club's training base from 1986 until 2010. In 2009, the Demons first moved their training facilities from the Junction Oval to Casey Fields in Cranbourne East. The club maintains a presence at the fields, with the venue being the home ground of its AFLW team and VFL/VFLW affiliates the Casey Demons. It based its AFL training program at the venue for the duration of the 2021 season, which was interrupted by the COVID-19 pandemic. The club trains at Casey regularly during the summer and once every one or two weeks during the football season. Currently, the Demons' football offices and indoor training facilities are based at AAMI Park, where they moved in late 2010, and its administrative offices located within the MCG.

After Collingwood moved their outdoor training to the renovated Olympic Park Oval in 2013, Melbourne moved their training to the adjacent Gosch's Paddock public oval. The oval was upgraded in the 2021/22 off-season to increase the dimensions to better match the measurements of the MCG and Docklands Stadium. Redevelopment of Goschs Paddock oval commenced on 5 December 2021. Given AAMI Park is co-tenanted with three other professional sporting clubs, Melbourne have often investigated moving to a dedicated club-specific facility. In August 2021 it was reported the club was considering moving all its football and administrative offices, and indoor training facilities, to the land where Car Park E next to AAMI Park is located. In December 2023, the club commenced a feasibility study of land within the Caulfield Racecourse Reserve. In mid-2026 the club reportedly lost out on moving their training program to Waverley Park in Mulgrave in favour of Richmond, who moved their training facilities in lieu of Punt Road Oval's redevelopment.

Aside from the MCG, Melbourne also plays home games in the Northern Territory; from 2010 to 2019 the played one home game per year at Marrara Oval in Darwin, since 2014 the club has played one home game per year at Traeger Park in Alice Springs.

== Membership base and supporters ==
Melbourne has improved their membership and attendances steadily since the failed Hawthorn merger in 1996, building a membership base of over 30,000 since 2009. The membership record of 36,937 was set in 2011 before it was broken in April 2016 to finish with 39,211 for the 2016 season, this record was broken the next year in April 2017. In May 2017, Melbourne signed up 40,000 members for the first time. In May 2019, Melbourne signed up 50,000 members for the first time. A 2000 Roy Morgan AFL survey suggested that Melbourne supporters had the highest household income.

Year	Members	Finishing position including finals position
1984	6,297	9th
1985	5,801	11th
1986	4,511	11th
1987	3,122	3rd
1988	10,078	2nd
1989	8,184	4th
1990	10,111	4th
1991	10,153	4th
1992	8,681	11th
1993	10,097	10th
1994	10,648	4th
1995	9,544	9th
1996	12,964	14th
1997	15,350	16th
1998	17,870	4th
1999	19,713	14th
2000	18,227	2nd
2001	22,940	11th
2002	20,152	6th
2003	20,844	14th
2004	25,252	7th
2005	24,220	8th
2006	24,698	5th
2007	28,077	14th
2008	29,619	16th
2009	31,506	16th
2010	33,358	12th
2011	36,937	13th
2012	35,345	16th
2013	33,177	17th
2014	35,911	17th
2015	35,953	13th
2016	39,211	11th
2017	42,233	9th
2018	44,279	4th
2019	52,421	17th
2020	40,571	9th
2021	53,188	1st
2022	66,484	5th
2023	70,785	6th
2024	65,479	14th
2025	58,563	14th

=== Notable supporters ===
- Sir Henry Bolte (Premier of Victoria)
- Rupert Murdoch (businessman)
- John So (Lord Mayor of Melbourne)
- Anthony Mundine (Boxer and Rugby League player)
- Sir Billy Snedden (Politician)
- Baz Lurhman (Film Director)
- Rod Laver (Tennis player)
- Don Lane (Television personality)
- Ron Walker (Businessman)
- Rod Carnegie (Businessman)
- Robert Champion de Crespigny (Businessman)
- Hamish Blake (Comedian)
- Ryan Shelton (Comedian)
- Rob Sitch (Comedian)
- Ella Hooper (musician)
- Wilbur Wilde (Musician)
- Jim Keays (Musician)
- Nazeem Hussain (Comedian)
- Shane Bourne (Comedian)
- Temper Trap (Music group)
- David Hobson (Singer)
- Peter Russell-Clarke (chef, author and illustrator)
- Alan Stockdale (Politician)
- Tony Staley (Politician)
- Brad Hodge (Australian cricketer)
- Steve Moneghetti (marathon runner)
- Beverley O'Connor (television and radio personality)
- James Tomkins (Olympic Rower)
- Mack Horton (Olympic Swimmer)
- Nicky Buckley (television personality)
- Geoff Cox (television presenter)
- Rob Gell (television weatherman)
- Greg Evans (television host)
- Michael Veitch (comedian and writer)
- Tim Wilson (Politician)
- Nicole Werner (Politician)
- Louise Staley (Politician)
- Archie Thompson (Soccer player)
- Andrew Daddo (Television presenter)
- James Frecheville (Actor)
- Veronica Milsom (Radio personality)
- Christian Welch (NRL player)
- Joe and Carlo Salanitri (Sooshi Mango comedy troupe members)
- Broden Kelly (Comedian and actor)

== Club honours ==
=== Club achievements ===
Premierships
Competition	Level	Wins	Years won
Australian Football League	Seniors	13	1900, 1926, 1939, 1940, 1941, 1948, 1955, 1956, 1957, 1959, 1960, 1964, 2021
Australian Football League	Reserves (1919–1999)	12	1931, 1932, 1933, 1934, 1935, 1939, 1949, 1956, 1969, 1970, 1984, 1993
Australian Football League	Under 19s (1946–1991)	6	1947, 1953, 1964, 1971, 1981, 1983
AFL Women's	Seniors	1	2022 (S7)
Victorian Football Association	Seniors (1877–1896)	Nil	-
Victorian Premiership	Seniors (1870–1876)	3	1870, 1872, 1876
Other titles and honours
McClelland Trophy	Multiple (Note: Between 1951 and 1990 the McClelland Trophy was awarded to the club with the highest-aggregate points across the VFL/AFL seniors premiership, VFL/AFL reserves premiership, and VFL/AFL under 19s premiership. Between 1991 and 2022 it was awarded to the club who finished on top of the AFL premiership ladder, thereby merging it with the minor premiership. Since 2023 it has been awarded to the club with the highest aggregate-points across the AFL and AFL Women's competitions.)	6	1955, 1956, 1958, 1990, 2021, 2023
AFLX Tournament	Seniors	1	2018
VFL/AFL pre-season competition	Seniors	1	1989
VFL Night Series	Seniors	2	1971, 1987
Lightning Premiership	Seniors	1	1952
Finishing positions
Australian Football League	Minor premiership	10	1939, 1940, 1955, 1956, 1957, 1958, 1959, 1960, 1964, 2021
Australian Football League	Grand Finalist	5	1946, 1954, 1958, 1988, 2000
Australian Football League	Wooden spoons	12	1905, 1906, 1919, 1923, 1951, 1969, 1974, 1978, 1981, 1997, 2008, 2009
AFL Women's	Minor premiership	Nil	-
AFL Women's	Grand Finalist	1	2022 (S6)
AFL Women's	Wooden spoons	Nil	-

=== Melbourne Team of the Century ===
The Melbourne Football Club Team of the Century was announced on 24 June 2000 at Crown Casino. The selectors were Percy Beames (former player and journalist), Lynda Carroll (club historian), Bill Guest (MFC Director), Greg Hobbs (journalist), John Mitchell (former MFC and MCC President), Linda Pearce (journalist), Dudley Phillips (supporter), Stephen Phillips (media consultant) and Mike Sheahan (journalist), with CEO John Anderson as non-voting chairman.

**Melbourne Team of the Century**
B:	John Beckwith	Tassie Johnson	Don Cordner
HB:	Noel McMahen	Gary Hardeman	Don Williams
C:	Brian Dixon	Allan La Fontaine	Robert Flower
HF:	Hassa Mann	Ivor Warne-Smith	Garry Lyon
F:	Jack Mueller	Norm Smith	Percy Beames
Foll:	Denis Cordner	Ron Barassi (Captain)	Stuart Spencer
Int:	Frank Adams	Albert Chadwick	Wally Lock
Int:	Laurie Mithen	Jim Stynes	Todd Viney
Coach:	Norm Smith		

Stan Alves, Ian Ridley, Bob Johnson and Greg Wells were all named as emergencies.

=== Hall of Fame ===
The Hall of Fame was introduced in 2001 with Norm Smith inducted directly as a legend. The Hall of Fame consists of five legends and forty-four inductees.

Melbourne Football Club
**Hall of Fame**
**Legends**

**Ron Barassi**

Don Cordner

Jack Mueller

Ian Ridley

**Norm Smith**

**Inductees**

Frank Adams
Sam Allica
Stan Alves
Ron Baggott
**Percy Beames**
John Beckwith
Joe Blair
Barry Bourke
Jim Cardwell

Geoff Case
**Albert Chadwick**
Denis Cordner
**Brian Dixon**
**Robert Flower**
Maurie Gibb
Gary Hardeman
**H.C.A. Harrison**
Greg Healy

**Frank Hughes**
Alan Johnson
**Bob Johnson**
Tassie Johnson
**Allan La Fontaine**
Clyde Laidlaw
Wally Lock
Brett Lovett
Garry Lyon

**Hassa Mann**
**William McClelland**
Fred McGinis
Shane McGrath
Noel McMahen
Laurie Mithen
**Jack Mueller**
**David Neitz**
Percy Page

Dudley Phillips
**Stuart Spencer**
**Jim Stynes**
Todd Viney
Greg Wells
Sean Wight
Don Williams
**Tom Wills**

Players listed in **bold** are inductees in the Australian Football Hall of Fame.
Players listed in **bold and italics** are legends in the Australian Football Hall of Fame.

=== "150 Heroes" ===
Melbourne FC announced its "150 Heroes" to celebrate its 150th anniversary at Crown Casino on 7 June 2008. Each player, or their closest relative, was presented with an official 150 heroes medallion. The criteria for inclusion was games played (minimum of 100), best-and-fairest awards, premierships, Brownlow Medals, contribution to the club and state representation. Those who died in the war were judged based on their achievements before their death.

The heroes named were:

Jim Abernethy, Frank Adams, Bill Allen, Stan Alves, Syd Anderson, Tony Anderson, Lance Arnold, Ron Baggott, Garry Baker, Harold Ball, Ron Barassi, Percy Beames, John Beckwith, George Bickford, Ray Biffin, Barry Bourke, Harry Brereton, Cameron Bruce, Keith Carroll, Geoff Case, Albert Chadwick, Noel Clarke, Geoff Collins, Jack Collins, Chris Connolly, Bob Corbett, Denis Cordner, Don Cordner, Ted Cordner, Vin Coutie, Harry Coy, Jim Davidson, Frank Davis, Ross Dillon, Carl Ditterich, Brian Dixon, Len Dockett, Adrian Dullard, Hugh Dunbar, Richie Emselle, Fred Fanning, Jeff Farmer, Matthew Febey, Steven Febey, Dick Fenton-Smith, Rowley Fischer, Robert Flower, Laurie Fowler, Maurie Gibb, Peter Giles, Terry Gleeson, Brad Green, Rod Grinter, George Haines, Gary Hardeman, Henry Harrison, Gerard Healy, Greg Healy, Dick Hingston, Paul Hopgood, Danny Hughes, Anthony Ingerson, Eddie Jackson, Alan Johnson, Bob Johnson, Tassie Johnson, Trevor Johnson, Travis Johnstone, Gordon Jones, Les Jones, Bryan Kenneally, Allan La Fontaine, Clyde Laidlaw, Frank Langley, Jack Leith, Andrew Leoncelli, Charlie Lilley, Wally Lock, Harry Long, John Lord, Andy Lovell, Brett Lovett, Glenn Lovett, Garry Lyon, Hassa Mann, George Margitich, Peter Marquis, Bernie Massey, Anthony McDonald, James McDonald, Fred McGinis, Shane McGrath, Bob McKenzie, Col McLean, Ian McLean, Noel McMahen, Ken Melville, Laurie Mithen, Peter Moore, Jack Mueller, David Neitz, Stephen Newport, Jack O'Keefe, Andrew Obst, Gordon Ogden, Greg Parke, Joe Pearce, Jack Purse, Ian Ridley, Guy Rigoni, Frank Roberts, Russell Robertson, Alby Rodda, Brian Roet, Peter Rohde, Alan Rowarth, David Schwarz, Norm Smith, Steven Smith, Earl Spalding, Stuart Spencer, Charlie Streeter, Steven Stretch, Jim Stynes, Tony Sullivan, Dick Taylor, Ted Thomas, Ian Thorogood, Stephen Tingay, John Townsend, Keith Truscott, Geoff Tunbridge, Bill Tymms, Barrie Vagg, Francis Vine, Todd Viney, Ivor Warne-Smith, Ray Wartman, Athol Webb, Greg Wells, Jeff White, Sean Wight, Don Williams, Brian Wilson, Stan Wittman, Shane Woewodin, Graeme Yeats, Charlie Young, Adem Yze

== Match records ==
- Highest score: 182 points
  Round 21, 1986 (MCG) – Melbourne 28.14 (182) vs North Melbourne 14.13 (97)
  Round 5, 1991 (MCG) – Melbourne 28.14 (182) vs North Melbourne 17.10 (112)
- Lowest score: 2 points
  Round 16, 1899 (Brunswick Street Oval) – Melbourne 0.2 (2) vs Fitzroy 5.10 (40)
- Highest score conceded: 238 points
  Round 17, 1979 (Waverley Park) – Melbourne 6.12 (48) vs Fitzroy 36.22 (238)
- Lowest score conceded: 8 points
  Round 7, 1903 (MCG) – Melbourne 4.8 (32) vs Carlton 1.2 (8)
- Biggest winning margin: 141 points
  Round 9, 1926 (MCG) – Melbourne 21.28 (154) vs Hawthorn 1.7 (13)
- Biggest losing margin: 190 points
  Round 17, 1979 (Waverley Park) – Melbourne 6.12 (48) vs Fitzroy 36.22 (238)
- Highest losing score: 151 points
  Round 10, 1940 (MCG) – Melbourne 22.19 (151) vs Essendon 24.10 (154)
- Lowest winning score: 28 points
  Round 9, 1908 (MCG) 1897 – Melbourne 4.4 (28) vs Fitzroy 3.7 (25)
  Round 15, 1909 (MCG) – Melbourne 4.4 (28) vs University 2.15 (27)
- Longest winning streak: 19 games
  Round 15, 1955 vs North Melbourne (MCG) to round 13, 1956 vs Carlton (MCG)
- Longest losing streak: 20 games
  Round 4, 1981 vs St Kilda (MCG) to round 1, 1982 vs Sydney (SCG)
- Record attendance (home and away game): 99,346
  Round 10, 1958 (MCG) vs Collingwood
- Record attendance (finals match): 115,802
  Grand Final, 1956 (MCG) vs Collingwood
- Most goals in a match by an individual: 18 goals
  Fred Fanning – round 19, 1947 (Junction Oval) vs St Kilda
- Most disposals in a match by an individual, since 1965: 48 disposals
  Greg Wells – round 13, 1980 (MCG) vs Fitzroy

== Current squad ==
Melbourne Football Club · AFL personnel
Playing list		Inactive list	Coaching staff
2 Jacob van Rooyen; 3 Christian Salem; 4 Harvey Langford; 5 Xavier Lindsay; 6 Caleb Windsor; 8 Jake Lever; 9 Jack Steele; 10 Daniel Turner; 11 Max Gawn (c); 12 Koltyn Tholstrup; 13 Jai Culley*; 14 Changkuoth Jiath; 15 Ed Langdon; 16 Bailey Laurie; 17 Jake Bowey; 19 Xavier Taylor; 20 Thomas Matthews; 21 Matthew Jefferson; 22 Blake Howes; 26 Jed Adams; 27 Max Heath; 28 Brody Mihocek	30 Harry Sharp; 31 Bayley Fritsch; 32 Tom Sparrow; 33 Latrelle Pickett; 35 Harrison Petty; 36 Kysaiah Pickett; 37 Kade Chandler; 38 Oscar Berry*; 39 Ricky Mentha*; 41 Paddy Cross; 44 Luker Kentfield*; 46 Lukas Cooke*; 47 Joel Fitzgerald*; 48 Max Mapley*; Lochie Burrows; Zane Duursma; Ben Forster; Mitch Harris; Will McLachlan; Bodie Ryan; Kaie Sullivan		Senior coach: Steven King; Assistant coaches: Jared Rivers (back line); Nathan Jones (midfield/stoppages); Troy Chaplin (forward line); Mark Jamar (ruck); Rory Atkins (development); Legend: (c) captain; * rookie; Updated: 22 November 2026; Sources: Players, coaches

== Honour board ==
The honour board is listed from the first VFL/AFL season and includes the following individual awards:

- Keith 'Bluey' Truscott Trophy – awarded to the Melbourne Football Club's best and fairest player. Named after Keith Truscott who died in World War II.
- Leading goalkicker award – awarded to the player who kicks the most goals during the season.
- Harold Ball Memorial Trophy – awarded to the best first-year player between 1933 and 2011, and to the best young player from 2012 onward. Named in honour of Harold Ball who died in World War II and won the award in 1939.

Legend:
^ Premiers, * Grand finalist, † Finals, ‡ Wooden spoon
Bold italics: competition leading goal kicker

Season	Position	President	Secretary/general manager/CEO	Coach	Captain(s)	Best and fairest	Leading goalkicker (total)	Harold Ball Memorial Trophy^{2}
1897	4th†	H. C. A. Harrison	R. C. McLeod		Ned Sutton		Jack Leith (22)	
1898	6th	H. C. A. Harrison	Amos Norcott		Ned Sutton		Charlie Young (21)	
1899	6th	H. C. A. Harrison	Amos Norcott		Eddie Sholl		Jack Leith (21)	
1900	1st^	H. C. A. Harrison	Amos Norcott		Dick Wardill		Tommy Ryan (24)	
1901	5th	H. C. A. Harrison	Amos Norcott		William C. McClelland		Frank Langley (17)	
1902	4th†	H. C. A. Harrison	Amos Norcott		William C. McClelland		Jack Leith (26)	
1903	7th	H. C. A. Harrison	Amos Norcott		William C. McClelland		Vince Coutie (19)	
1904	6th	H. C. A. Harrison	Amos Norcott		William C. McClelland		Vince Coutie (39)	
1905	8th‡	H. C. A. Harrison	Amos Norcott		Frank Langley		Harry Cordner (16)	
1906	8th‡	H. C. A. Harrison	Amos Norcott		Arthur Sowden		Basil Onyons (16)	
1907	7th	T. F. Morkham	George Beachcroft	Alex Hall	Vince Coutie		Jack Leith (21)	
1908	8th	T. F. Morkham	Amos Norcott	Alex Hall	Hugh Purse		Vince Coutie (37)	
1909	5th	T. F. Morkham	J. A. Harper	Alex Hall	Bernie Nolan		Harry Brereton (34)	
1910	9th	T. F. Morkham	G. W. Lamb	Eddie Drohan	Vince Coutie		Stan Fairbairn (24)	
1911	7th	A. A. Aitken	G. W. Lamb	Alex Hall	Vince Coutie		Harry Brereton (46)	
1912	6th	William C. McClelland	Andrew Manzie	Alex Hall	Alf George		Harry Brereton (56)	
1913	9th	William C. McClelland	Andrew Manzie	Alex Hall	Alf George		Mick Maguire (13)	
1914	9th	William C. McClelland	Andrew Manzie	Len Incigneri	Len Incigneri		Arthur Best (30)	
1915	4th†	William C. McClelland	Andrew Manzie	Jack McKenzie	Jack McKenzie		Roy Park (35)	
1916–1918^{3}	—	William C. McClelland	Andrew Manzie	George Heinz	George Heinz			
1919	9th‡	William C. McClelland	Andrew Manzie	George Heinz	George Heinz		George Heinz (15)	
1920	8th	William C. McClelland	Andrew Manzie	Gerald Brosnan	George Heinz		Harry Harker (23)	
1921	6th	William C. McClelland	Andrew Manzie	Percy Wilson	Percy Wilson		Harry Harker (47)	
1922	6th	William C. McClelland	Andrew Manzie	Percy Wilson	Percy Wilson		Harry Harker (47)	
1923	9th‡	William C. McClelland	Andrew Manzie	Percy Wilson	Percy Wilson		Percy Tulloh (31)	
1924	8th	William C. McClelland	Andrew Manzie	Gordon Rattray	Albert Chadwick		Percy Tulloh (24)	
1925	3rd†	William C. McClelland	Andrew Manzie	Albert Chadwick	Albert Chadwick		Harry Davie (56)	
1926	1st^	William C. McClelland	Andrew Manzie	Albert Chadwick	Albert Chadwick		Harry Moyes (55)	
1927	5th	Vernon Ransford	Andrew Manzie	Albert Chadwick	Albert Chadwick		Harry Davie (40)	
1928	3rd†	Vernon Ransford	Andrew Manzie	Ivor Warne-Smith	Ivor Warne-Smith		Bob Johnson (55)	
1929	5th	Joe Blair	Andrew Manzie	Ivor Warne-Smith	Ivor Warne-Smith		Dick Taylor (30)	
1930	5th	Joe Blair	Andrew Manzie	Ivor Warne-Smith	Ivor Warne-Smith		George Margitich (73)	
1931	8th	Joe Blair	Andrew Manzie	Ivor Warne-Smith	Ivor Warne-Smith		George Margitich (66)	
1932	9th	Joe Blair	Charlie Streeter	Ivor Warne-Smith	Francis Vine		George Margitich (60)	
1933	10th	Joe Blair	Percy Page	Frank 'Checker' Hughes	Francis Vine		Bob Johnson (62)	Les Jones
1934	6th	Joe Blair	Percy Page	Frank 'Checker' Hughes	Colin Niven		Jack Mueller (52)	Allan La Fontaine
1935	6th	Joe Blair	Percy Page	Frank 'Checker' Hughes	Colin Niven	Allan La Fontaine	Maurie Gibb (59)	Ray Wartman
1936	3rd†	Joe Blair	Percy Page	Frank 'Checker' Hughes	Allan La Fontaine	Allan La Fontaine	Eric Glass (56)	
1937	3rd†	Joe Blair	Percy Page	Frank 'Checker' Hughes	Allan La Fontaine	Jack Mueller	Ron Baggott (51)	
1938	5th	Joe Blair	Percy Page	Frank 'Checker' Hughes	Allan La Fontaine	Norm Smith	Norm Smith (80)	Dick Hingston
1939	1st^	Joe Blair	Percy Page	Frank 'Checker' Hughes	Allan La Fontaine	Jack Mueller	Norm Smith (54)	Harold Ball
1940	1st^	Joe Blair	Percy Page	Frank 'Checker' Hughes	Allan La Fontaine	Ron Baggott	Norm Smith (86)	Col McLean
1941	1st^	Joe Blair	Percy Page	Frank 'Checker' Hughes	Allan La Fontaine	Allan La Fontaine	Norm Smith (89)	Ted Cordner
1942	8th	Joe Blair	Jack Chessell	Percy Beames	Percy Beames	Allan La Fontaine	Fred Fanning (37)	
1943	7th	Joe Blair	Jack Chessell	Percy Beames	Percy Beames	Don Cordner	Fred Fanning (62)	
1944	8th	Joe Blair	Jack Chessell	Percy Beames	Percy Beames	Norm Smith	Fred Fanning (87)	Es Downey
1945	9th	Joe Blair	Jack Chessell	Frank 'Checker' Hughes	Norm Smith	Fred Fanning	Fred Fanning (67)	
1946	2nd*	Joe Blair	Jack Chessell	Frank 'Checker' Hughes	Norm Smith	Jack Mueller	Jack Mueller (58)	Len Dockett
1947	6th	William Flintoft	Jack Chessell	Frank 'Checker' Hughes	Norm Smith	Wally Lock	Fred Fanning (97)	Eddie Jackson
1948	1st^	William Flintoft	Alex Gray	Frank 'Checker' Hughes	Don Cordner	Alby Rodda	Lance Arnold (41)	
1949	5th	William Flintoft	Alex Gray	Allan La Fontaine	Don Cordner	Len Dockett	Bob McKenzie (40)	Mike Woods
1950	4th†	Albert Chadwick	A. S. Thompson	Allan La Fontaine	Shane McGrath	Denis Cordner	Denis Cordner (36)	
1951	12th‡	Albert Chadwick	Jim Cardwell	Allan La Fontaine	Denis Cordner	Noel McMahen	Bob McKenzie (40)	John Beckwith
1952	6th	Albert Chadwick	Jim Cardwell	Norm Smith	Denis Cordner	Geoff McGivern	Noel Clarke (49)	
1953	11th	Albert Chadwick	Jim Cardwell	Norm Smith	Denis Cordner	Ken Melville	Bob McKenzie (38)	Ken Melville
1954	2nd*	Albert Chadwick	Jim Cardwell	Norm Smith	Geoff Collins	Denis Cordner	Noel Clarke (51)	Bob Johnson
1955	1st^	Albert Chadwick	Jim Cardwell	Norm Smith	Noel McMahen	Stuart Spencer	Stuart Spencer (34)	Trevor Johnson
1956	1st^	Albert Chadwick	Jim Cardwell	Norm Smith	Noel McMahen	Stuart Spencer	Bob Johnson (43)	Jim Sandral
1957	1st^	Albert Chadwick	Jim Cardwell	Norm Smith	John Beckwith	John Beckwith	Athol Webb (56)	Geoff Tunbridge
1958	2nd*	Albert Chadwick	Jim Cardwell	Norm Smith	John Beckwith	Laurie Mithen	Ron Barassi (44), Athol Webb (44)	Alan Rowarth
1959	1st^	Albert Chadwick	Jim Cardwell	Norm Smith	John Beckwith	Laurie Mithen	Ron Barassi (46)	Hassa Mann
1960	1st^	Albert Chadwick	Jim Cardwell	Norm Smith	Ron Barassi	Brian Dixon	Ian Ridley (38)	Ray Nilsson
1961	3rd†	Albert Chadwick	Jim Cardwell	Norm Smith	Ron Barassi	Ron Barassi	Bob Johnson (36)	Brian Roet
1962	4th†	Albert Chadwick	Jim Cardwell	Norm Smith	Ron Barassi	Hassa Mann	Laurie Mithen (37)	John Townsend
1963	3rd†	Donald Duffy	Jim Cardwell	Norm Smith	Ron Barassi	Hassa Mann	Barry Bourke (48)	Barry Bourke
1964	1st^	Donald Duffy	Jim Cardwell	Norm Smith	Ron Barassi	Ron Barassi	John Townsend (35)	Graeme Jacobs
1965	7th	Donald Duffy	Jim Cardwell	Norm Smith	Hassa Mann	John Townsend	John Townsend (34)	
1966	11th	Donald Duffy	Jim Cardwell	Norm Smith	Hassa Mann	Terry Leahy	Barrie Vagg (20)	Terry Leahy
1967	7th	Donald Duffy	Jim Cardwell	Norm Smith	Hassa Mann	Hassa Mann	Hassa Mann (38)	
1968	8th	Donald Duffy	Jim Cardwell	John Beckwith	Hassa Mann	Ray Groom	Hassa Mann (29)	Greg Parke
1969	12th‡	Donald Duffy	Jim Cardwell	John Beckwith	Hassa Mann	John Townsend	Ross Dillon (48)	Paul Rowlands
1970	10th	Donald Duffy	Jim Cardwell	John Beckwith	Tassie Johnson	Frank Davis	Ross Dillon (41)	Graham Molloy
1971	7th	Donald Duffy	Jim Cardwell	Ian Ridley	Frank Davis	Greg Wells	Paul Callery (38)	
1972	8th	Donald Duffy	Jim Cardwell	Ian Ridley	Frank Davis	Stan Alves	Greg Parke (63)	Ross Brewer
1973	10th	Donald Duffy	Jim Cardwell	Ian Ridley	Stan Alves	Carl Ditterich	Ross Brewer (32)	Robert Flower
1974	12th‡	Donald Duffy	Jim Cardwell	Bob Skilton	Stan Alves	Stan Alves	Ross Brewer (40)	Garry Baker
1975	10th	John Mitchell	Jim Cardwell	Bob Skilton	Stan Alves	Laurie Fowler	Greg Wells (32)	Marty Lyons
1976	6th	John Mitchell	Ivan Moore	Bob Skilton	Stan Alves	Greg Wells	Ray Biffin (47)	Peter O'Keefe
1977	11th	John Mitchell	Ray Manley	Bob Skilton	Greg Wells	Robert Flower	Ross Brewer (26)	Tom Flower
1978	12th‡	John Mitchell	Ray Manley	Dennis Jones	Greg Wells	Garry Baker	Henry Coles (33)	Peter Thorne
1979	11th	Wayne Reid	Ray Manley	Carl Ditterich	Carl Ditterich	Laurie Fowler	Robert Flower (33)	Peter Giles
1980	9th	Wayne Reid	Richard Seddon	Carl Ditterich	Carl Ditterich	Laurie Fowler	Brent Crosswell (31)	Stephen Bickford
1981	12th‡	Billy Snedden	Richard Seddon	Ron Barassi	Robert Flower	Steven Smith	Mark Jackson (76)	Mark Jackson
1982	8th	Billy Snedden	Richard Seddon	Ron Barassi	Robert Flower	Steven Icke	Gerard Healy (77)	Adrian Battiston
1983	8th	Billy Snedden	Richard Seddon	Ron Barassi	Robert Flower	Alan Johnson	Robert Flower (40)	Russell Richards
1984	9th	Billy Snedden	Richard Seddon	Ron Barassi	Robert Flower	Gerard Healy	Kelvin Templeton (51)	Graeme Yeats
1985	11th	Billy Snedden	Ray Manley	Ron Barassi	Robert Flower	Danny Hughes	Brian Wilson (40)	Rod Grinter
1986	11th	Billy Snedden,^{6} Stuart Spencer	Ray Manley	John Northey	Robert Flower	Greg Healy	Greg Healy (35)	Garry Lyon
1987	3rd†	Stuart Spencer	Tony King	John Northey	Robert Flower	Steven Stretch	Robert Flower (47)	Steven O'Dwyer
1988	2nd*	Stuart Spencer	Tony King	John Northey	Greg Healy	Steven O'Dwyer	Ricky Jackson (43)	Andy Lovell
1989	4th†	Stuart Spencer	Tony King	John Northey	Greg Healy	Alan Johnson	Darren Bennett (34)	Luke Beveridge
1990	4th†	Stuart Spencer	Tony King	John Northey	Greg Healy	Garry Lyon	Darren Bennett (87)	Rod Keogh
1991	4th†	Stuart Spencer,^{7} Ian Ridley	Tony King	John Northey	Garry Lyon	Jim Stynes	Allen Jakovich (71)	Allen Jakovich
1992	11th	Ian Ridley	Tony King^{7}, Hassa Mann	John Northey	Garry Lyon	Glenn Lovett	Allen Jakovich (40)	Chris Sullivan
1993	10th	Ian Ridley	Hassa Mann	Neil Balme	Garry Lyon	Todd Viney	Allen Jakovich (39)	David Neitz
1994	4th†	Ian Ridley	Hassa Mann	Neil Balme	Garry Lyon	Garry Lyon	Garry Lyon (79)	Paul Prymke
1995	9th	Ian Ridley	Hassa Mann	Neil Balme	Garry Lyon	Jim Stynes	Garry Lyon (77)	Adem Yze
1996	14th	Ian Ridley,^{7} Joseph Gutnick	Hassa Mann	Neil Balme	Garry Lyon	Jim Stynes	David Neitz (56)	Darren O'Brien
1997	16th‡	Joseph Gutnick	Hassa Mann,^{7} Cameron Schwab	Neil Balme,^{4} Greg Hutchison^{5}	Garry Lyon	Jim Stynes	David Neitz (30), Jeff Farmer (30)	Anthony McDonald
1998	4th†	Joseph Gutnick	Cameron Schwab	Neale Daniher	Todd Viney	Todd Viney	Jeff Farmer (47)	Guy Rigoni
1999	14th	Joseph Gutnick	Cameron Schwab,^{7} John Anderson	Neale Daniher	Todd Viney	David Schwarz	David Neitz (46)	Peter Walsh
2000	2nd*	Joseph Gutnick	John Anderson	Neale Daniher	David Neitz	Shane Woewodin	Jeff Farmer (76)	Matthew Whelan
2001	11th	Joseph Gutnick,^{7} Gabriel Szondy	John Anderson	Neale Daniher	David Neitz	Adem Yze	Russell Robertson (42)	Scott Thompson
2002	6th†	Gabriel Szondy	John Anderson	Neale Daniher	David Neitz	David Neitz	David Neitz (82)	Steven Armstrong
2003	14th	Gabriel Szondy,^{7} Paul Gardner	Ray Ellis	Neale Daniher	David Neitz	Russell Robertson	David Neitz (65)	Ryan Ferguson
2004	7th†	Paul Gardner	Steve Harris	Neale Daniher	David Neitz	Jeff White	David Neitz (69)	Aaron Davey
2005	8th†	Paul Gardner	Steve Harris	Neale Daniher	David Neitz	Travis Johnstone	Russell Robertson (73)	Chris Johnson
2006	5th†	Paul Gardner	Steve Harris	Neale Daniher	David Neitz	James McDonald	David Neitz (68)	Clint Bartram
2007	14th	Paul Gardner	Steve Harris	Neale Daniher,^{6} Mark Riley^{5}	David Neitz	James McDonald	Russell Robertson (42)	Ricky Petterd
2008	16th‡	Paul Gardner,^{7} Jim Stynes	Paul McNamee^{4} Cameron Schwab	Dean Bailey	David Neitz	Cameron Bruce	Brad Miller (26)	Cale Morton
2009	16th‡	Jim Stynes	Cameron Schwab	Dean Bailey	James McDonald	Aaron Davey	Russell Robertson (29)	Liam Jurrah
2010	12th	Jim Stynes	Cameron Schwab	Dean Bailey	James McDonald	Brad Green	Brad Green (55)	Tom Scully
2011	13th	Jim Stynes	Cameron Schwab	Dean Bailey,^{4} Todd Viney^{5}	Brad Green	Brent Moloney	Liam Jurrah (40)	Jeremy Howe
2012	16th	Jim Stynes,^{7} Don McLardy	Cameron Schwab	Mark Neeld	Jack Grimes, Jack Trengove	Nathan Jones	Mitch Clark (29)	Tom McDonald
2013	17th	Don McLardy,^{7} Glen Bartlett	Cameron Schwab,^{7} Peter Jackson	Mark Neeld,^{4} Neil Craig^{5}	Jack Grimes, Jack Trengove	Nathan Jones	Jeremy Howe (28)	Jack Viney
2014	17th	Glen Bartlett	Peter Jackson	Paul Roos	Jack Grimes, Nathan Jones	Nathan Jones	Chris Dawes (20)	Dom Tyson
2015	13th	Glen Bartlett	Peter Jackson	Paul Roos	Nathan Jones	Bernie Vince	Jesse Hogan (44)	Jesse Hogan
2016	11th	Glen Bartlett	Peter Jackson	Paul Roos	Nathan Jones	Jack Viney	Jesse Hogan (41)	Jayden Hunt
2017	9th	Glen Bartlett	Peter Jackson	Simon Goodwin	Nathan Jones; Jack Viney	Clayton Oliver	Jeff Garlett (42)	Clayton Oliver
2018	4th†	Glen Bartlett	Peter Jackson	Simon Goodwin	Nathan Jones; Jack Viney	Max Gawn	Tom McDonald (53)	Bayley Fritsch
2019	17th	Glen Bartlett	Gary Pert	Simon Goodwin	Nathan Jones; Jack Viney	Max Gawn; Clayton Oliver	Christian Petracca (22)	Harrison Petty
2020	9th	Glen Bartlett	Gary Pert	Simon Goodwin	Max Gawn	Christian Petracca	Bayley Fritsch (22)	Luke Jackson
2021	1st^	Glen Bartlett,^{7} Kate Roffey	Gary Pert	Simon Goodwin	Max Gawn	Clayton Oliver	Bayley Fritsch (59)	Kysaiah Pickett
2022	5th†	Kate Roffey	Gary Pert	Simon Goodwin	Max Gawn	Clayton Oliver	Bayley Fritsch (55)	Jake Bowey
2023	6th†	Kate Roffey	Gary Pert	Simon Goodwin	Max Gawn	Christian Petracca	Bayley Fritsch (38)	Judd McVee, Jacob van Rooyen
2024	14th	Kate Roffey	Gary Pert	Simon Goodwin	Max Gawn	Jack Viney	Bayley Fritsch (41)	Caleb Windsor
2025	14th	Brad Green	David Chippindall,^{8} Paul Guerra	Simon Goodwin,^{9} Troy Chaplin^{10}	Max Gawn	Max Gawn	Kysaiah Pickett (40)	Harvey Langford
2026	9th†	Steven Smith	Paul Guerra, Brian Cook, Dan Taylor	Steven King	Max Gawn	Max Gawn	Jacob Van Rooyen (42)	Koltyn Tholstrup

== Individual awards ==
=== Best and Fairest ===
See Keith 'Bluey' Truscott Medal

=== Norm Smith Medal winners ===
- Christian Petracca (2021)

=== Brownlow Medal winners ===
- Ivor Warne-Smith (1926, 1928)
- Don Cordner (1946)
- Brian Wilson (1982)
- Peter Moore (1984)
- Jim Stynes (1991)
- Shane Woewodin (2000)

=== Leigh Matthews Trophy ===
- Jim Stynes (1991)

=== VFL Leading Goalkicker Medal winners (1897–1954) ===
- Jack Leith (1897)
- Vince Coutie (1904)
- Harry Brereton (1911, 1912)
- Fred Fanning (1943, 1944, 1945, 1947)

=== Coleman Medal winners (since 1955) ===
- David Neitz (2002)

=== AFL Rising Star winners ===
- Jared Rivers (2004)
- Jesse Hogan (2015)
- Luke Jackson (2021)

=== Mark of the Year winners ===
- Shaun Smith (1995) (Mark of the Century)
- Michael Newton (2007)
- Liam Jurrah (2010)
- Jeremy Howe (2012)

=== Goal of the Year winners ===
- Jeff Farmer (1998)

=== All-Australian – AFL (since 1991) ===
- Jim Stynes (1991, 1993)
- Garry Lyon (1993, 1994, 1995)
- Stephen Tingay (1994)
- Neil Balme (1994 (Coach))
- David Neitz (1995, 2002)
- Todd Viney (1998)
- Jeff Farmer (2000)
- Adem Yze (2002)
- Jeff White (2004)
- James McDonald (2006)
- James Frawley (2010)
- Mark Jamar (2010)
- Max Gawn (2016, 2018, 2019, 2020, 2021 (Captain), 2022, 2024, 2025, 2026 (Captain))
- Michael Hibberd (2017)
- Clayton Oliver (2018, 2021, 2022)
- Christian Petracca (2020, 2021, 2022, 2023)
- Jake Lever (2021)
- Steven May (2021, 2022)
- Simon Goodwin (2021 (Coach))
- Kysaiah Pickett (2025, 2026)

=== VFL Team of the Year (1982–1990) ===
- Gerard Healy (1982, 1984)
- Robert Flower (1982, 1983, 1984)
- Steven Icke (1982)
- Brian Wilson (1982)
- Peter Moore (1984)
- Steven Stretch (1987)
- Sean Wight (1987)
- Steven O'Dwyer (1988)
- Brett Lovett (1988, 1989, 1990)
- Alan Johnson (1989)
- Garry Lyon (1989, 1990)

=== All-Australian players – Interstate Carnivals (1953–1988) ===
- Ron Barassi (1956, 1958, 1961)
- Brian Dixon (1961)
- Hassa Mann (1966)
- Gary Hardeman (1972)
- Robert Flower (1980, 1983)
- Danny Hughes (1988)

=== National team representatives (since 1998) ===
- Jeff Farmer (1998)
- David Neitz (1998, 2002)
- Jim Stynes (1998)
- Todd Viney (1998)
- Shane Woewodin (2000)
- Adem Yze (2000, 2002)
- Cameron Bruce (2002, 2004)
- Clint Bizzell (2003)
- Brad Green (2004, 2010, 2011)
- Aaron Davey (2005, 2006, 2013)
- Brent Moloney (2005)
- Russell Robertson (2005)
- James McDonald (2006)
- James Frawley (2010, 2011)
- Colin Sylvia (2011)
- Jack Trengove (2011)
- Dom Barry (2013)
- Michael Hibberd (2017)
- Neville Jetta (2017)

== AFL Women's team ==
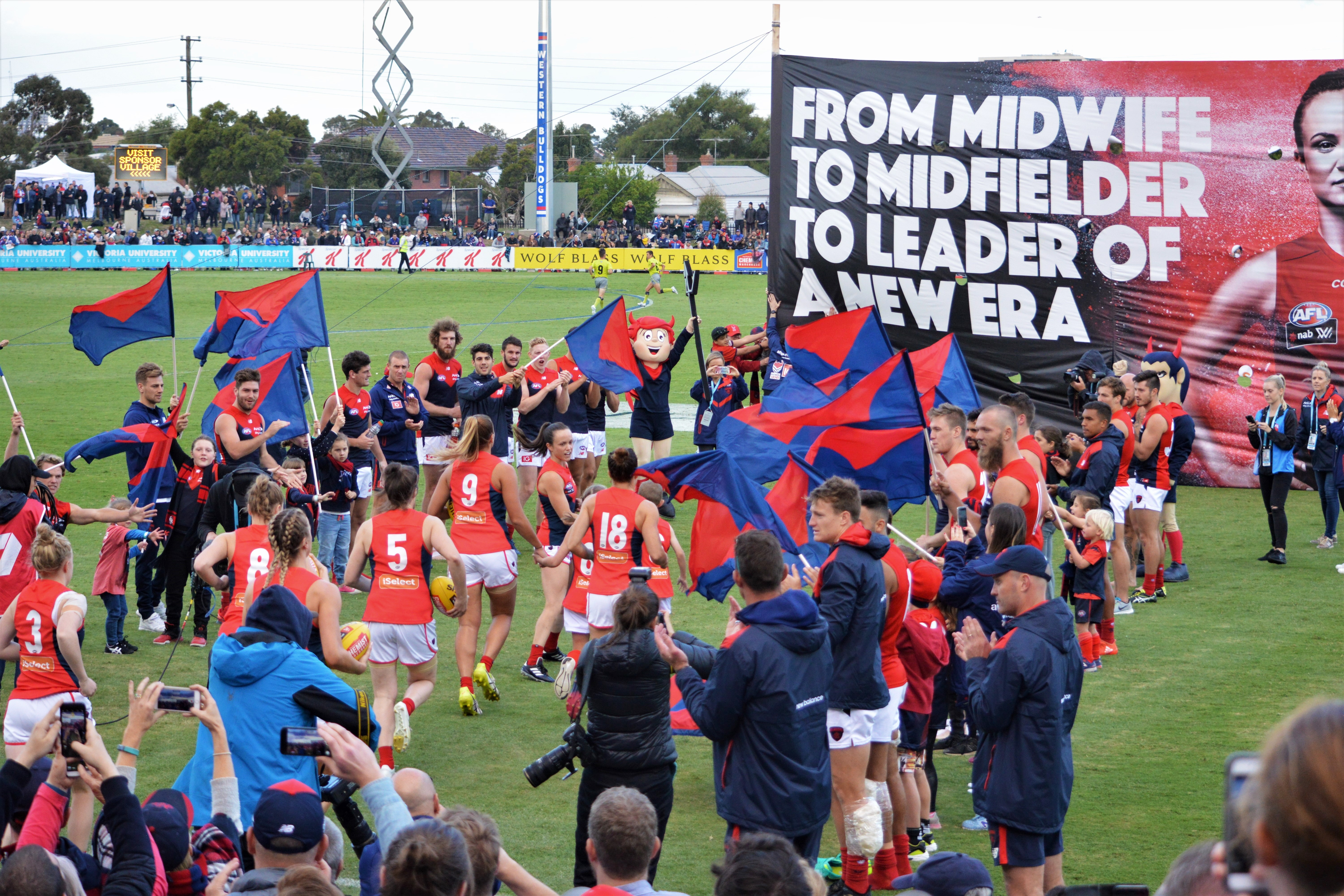
Melbourne captain Daisy Pearce leads her players past the men's side during round 3 of the 2017 AFL Women's season.

In June 2013, the club fielded a women's representative side known as the Chappettes against Western Bulldogs in the first AFL-sanctioned women's exhibition match, held at the MCG. The two teams competed annually over the next three years for the Hampson-Hardeman Cup. In 2016, when the AFL announced plans for AFL Women's, an eight team national women's league competition, Melbourne was asked to submit an application for a licence alongside other AFL clubs. The club was one of four Melbourne-based clubs to be granted a licence that year.

The club's first players were marquee signings Daisy Pearce and Melissa Hickey. The full list was completed later in the year with signings and selections made in the October draft period.

Oakleigh Chargers coach Mick Stinear was appointed the team's inaugural head coach in September 2016.

=== Current squad ===
Melbourne Football Club · AFL Women's personnel
Playing list		Inactive list	Coaching staff
1 Georgia Campbell; 2 Olivia Purcell; 3 Alyssia Pisano; 4 Paxy Paxman; 5 Tyla Hanks (vc); 6 Alyssa Bannan; 7 Tayla Harris; 8 Sarah Lampard; 9 Georgia Gall; 10 Kate Hore (c); 11 Molly O'Hehir; 12 Ryleigh Wotherspoon; 13 Maeve Chaplin; 14 Amelia Dethridge; 15 Lauren Pearce	17 Tahlia Gillard; 19 Laela Ebert; 20 Maggie Mahony; 21 Lauren Clifton; 22 Eliza McNamara; 23 Sinéad Goldrick; 24 Megan Fitzsimon; 25 Jacinta Hose; 26 Mia Austin; 28 Saraid Taylor; 29 Tahlia Fellows; 30 Shelley Heath; 32 Jordyn Allen; 33 Aoife Horisk*; 40 Jorja Livingstone	16 Grace Beasley; 18 Chloe Baker-West; 31 Bláithín Mackin	Senior coach: Tom Wilson; Assistant coaches: Riley Bonner (back line); Vincent Chungue (midfield); Daniel Currie (forward line); Rhiannon Watt (ruck); Legend: (c) captain; (vc) vice-captain; * rookie; Updated: 22 November 2026; Sources: Players, coaches

=== Season summaries ===
Melbourne AFLW honour roll
Season	Ladder	W–L–D	Finals	Coach	Captain(s)	Best and fairest	Leading goal kicker
2017	3rd	5–2–0	DNQ	Mick Stinear	Daisy Pearce	Daisy Pearce	Alyssa Mifsud (9)
2018	3rd	4–3–0	DNQ	Mick Stinear	Daisy Pearce	Daisy Pearce (2)	Tegan Cunningham (9)
2019	4th ^	4–3–0	DNQ	Mick Stinear	Elise O'Dea & Shelley Scott	Karen Paxman	Tegan Cunningham (8)
2020	4th ^	4–2–0	Semi-final	Mick Stinear	Daisy Pearce	Shelley Scott	Kate Hore (5)
2021	4th	7–2–0	Preliminary final	Mick Stinear	Daisy Pearce	Tyla Hanks & Karen Paxman (2)	Kate Hore (12)
2022 (S6)	2nd	9–1–0	Grand final	Mick Stinear	Daisy Pearce	Daisy Pearce (3)	Tayla Harris (18)
2022 (S7)	2nd	9–1–0	Premiers	Mick Stinear	Daisy Pearce	Kate Hore	Kate Hore (17)
2023	2nd	8–2–0	Semi Final	Mick Stinear	Kate Hore	Tyla Hanks (2) & Kate Hore (2)	Eden Zanker (23)
2024	9th	6–5–0	DNQ	Mick Stinear	Kate Hore	Kate Hore (3)	Alyssa Bannan (12)
2025	2nd	9–3–0	Preliminary Final	Mick Stinear	Kate Hore	Kate Hore (4)	Kate Hore (24)

^ Denotes the ladder was split into two conferences. Figure refers to the club's overall finishing position in the home-and-away season.

== See also ==
- Casey Demons (Melbourne is in an affiliation with Casey in the Victorian Football League and VFL Women's)
- List of Melbourne Football Club players
- List of Melbourne Football Club seasons
- Melbourne Hawks
- Sport in Victoria
- Sport in Australia

== Notes ==
1.The 2020 AFL season was shortened by five rounds as a result of the COVID-19 pandemic.
2.Awarded to the best first year player (1933–2011), then to the best young player (2012–present).
3.In recess owing to war.
4.Sacked mid-season.
5.Caretaker coach.
6.Retired mid-season.
7.Resigned mid-season.
8.Caretaker CEO.
9.Sacked mid-season.
10.Caretaker coach.
