= Tony King (footballer) =

Australian rules footballer

Personal information
- Full name: Tony King
- Born: 11 September 1955 (age 71)
- Original team: University Blacks
- Height: 185 cm (6 ft 1 in)
- Weight: 80 kg (176 lb)

Playing career^{1}
Years	Club	Games (Goals)
1978–80	Hawthorn	12 (7)
1980	St Kilda	4 (2)
Total		16 (9)
- ^{1} Playing statistics correct to the end of 1980.

Tony King (born 11 September 1955) is a former Australian rules footballer who played with Hawthorn and St Kilda in the Victorian Football League (VFL). King had an active career as a sporting administrator after his playing days concluded. He was the executive director of the National Basketball League for four years, before serving as general manager of the Melbourne Football Club from 1986 to 1992.
