= Charlie Streeter =

Australian rules footballer

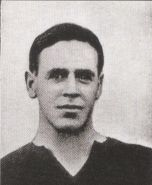

Personal information
- Full name: Charles Streeter
- Born: 15 August 1895; Maffra, Victoria
- Died: 14 October 1955 (aged 60); Moorabbin, Victoria
- Original team: Maffra
- Height: 170 cm (5 ft 7 in)
- Weight: 73 kg (161 lb)

Playing career^{1}
Years	Club	Games (Goals)
1920–1928	Melbourne	133 (10)
- ^{1} Playing statistics correct to the end of 1928.

Charles Streeter (15 August 1895 – 14 October 1955) was an Australian rules footballer who played for Melbourne in the Victorian Football League (VFL).

Streeter served with the 8th Australian Light Horse Regiment in the First World War and was wounded at Gallipoli in 1915.

A defender, Streeter was recruited to Melbourne from Maffra. He represented Victoria in two interstate fixtures against South Australia in 1921 and played in the back pocket for Melbourne in their 1926 premiership team. In 1931 he coached the Melbourne seconds to a premiership, then in 1932 became club secretary.
