= Paul Gardner (football administrator) =

Australian football administrator

- Born: Paul Albert Gardner
- Occupation: Businesspeople

Paul Albert Gardner AM is the former president of the Melbourne Football Club in the Australian Football League. He held that position between 2003 and 2008, when he resigned and was succeeded by Jim Stynes.

Gardner is also the former chairman of the Malthouse Theatre, chairman of advertising company Grey Global, former director of open Family Australia and works with the Transport Accident Commission.
