= Ray Wartman =

Australian rules footballer, born 1915

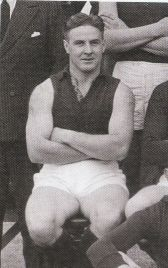

Personal information
- Born: 29 January 1915
- Died: 20 April 2008 (aged 93)
- Original teams: Whorouly, Camberwell
- Height: 180 cm (5 ft 11 in)
- Weight: 84 kg (185 lb)

Playing career^{1}
Years	Club	Games (Goals)
1932–1934	Camberwell	31 (10)
1935–1942	Melbourne	125 (61)
Total		156 (71)
- ^{1} Playing statistics correct to the end of 1942.

Career highlights
- Camberwell Semi-final Team: 1932; VFL premiership 1939, 1940, 1941; Melbourne Semi-final Team: 1936, 1939, 1940, 1941; Melbourne Preliminary Final Team: 1936, 1940; Melbourne Grand Final Team: 1939, 1940, 1941

Ray Wartman (29 January 1915 – 20 April 2008) was an Australian rules footballer who played with Melbourne in the VFL.

== Football ==
Wartman played with the Whorouly Football Club in the Ovens & King Football League in the early 1930s and commenced with his VFA career with the Camberwell Football Club in late 1932 during the final series. Wartman was cleared to Whorouly in early 1933. Wartman then returned to Camberwell in 1934, before commencing with Melbourne in 1935, winning the Best First Year Player award.

A wingman, Wartman was a member of Melbourne's successful side in the late 1930s and early 1940s. Wartman played in three consecutive premierships with Melbourne, in 1939, 1940, and 1941.

== Athletics ==
Wartman won the 1937 Castlemaine Gift, which elevated him as one of the pre-race favourites for the Stawell Gift, but he came second in his heat.

== Golf ==
Wartman made the semi-finals of the 1954 Victorian Amateur Golf Championships.

In 1955, Huntingdale Golf Club pair Bob Bull and Ray Wartman won the Australasian Foursomes Shield.
