= Percy Tulloh =

Australian rules footballer

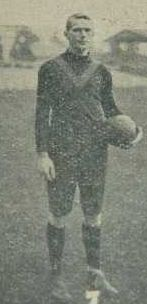

Personal information
- Full name: Arthur Percival Tulloh
- Born: 19 September 1900; Portland, Victoria
- Died: 30 March 1970 (aged 69); Burwood, Victoria
- Original teams: Wesley College, University
- Height: 173 cm (5 ft 8 in)
- Weight: 70 kg (154 lb)
- Positions: Half-forward flank, forward pocket

Playing career^{1}
Years	Club	Games (Goals)
1921–1927	Melbourne	69 (115)
1928	St Kilda	3 (2)
Total		72 (117)

Representative team honours^{2}
Years	Team	Games (Goals)
1924	Victorian B team	1 (0)
- ^{1} Playing statistics correct to the end of 1928.^{2} Representative statistics correct as of 1924.

Career highlights
- Melbourne leading goalkicker: 1923, 1924

Arthur Percival "Percy" Tulloh (19 September 1900 – 30 March 1970) was an Australian rules football player who spent most of his career with Melbourne in the Victorian Football League (VFL) and also played one season with St Kilda.

== Early life ==
Tulloh was educated at Wesley College in Melbourne. He captained the school team in football, cricket, and rowing.

== Football career ==
=== Melbourne ===
Recruited from Melbourne University Football Club, Tulloh made his debut in the VFL with the Melbourne Football Club in the first round of the 1921 season. At the relatively small height of 173 cm (5 ft 8 in), Tulloh played the majority of his career as a small forward, either on the half forward flank or as a forward pocket. He made an impact from the outset of his career, playing 15 matches in his first season and kicking 18 goals. Slightly less prolific in 1922, playing only 11 games, Tulloh's best two seasons in the VFL came in 1923 and 1924, when he kicked 31 and 24 goals respectively, winning Melbourne's Leading Goalkicker Award for each of the Demons' two poor seasons, where they finished eighth and ninth in the ten-team competition. In 1923, he was selected to represent the League in a match in Bendigo. Tulloh also played one match for the Victorian B team during 1924. Tulloh's career, however, declined from then on, playing only 13 matches in the next three seasons, while still kicking a respectable 27 goals. In 1926 Melbourne won their second premiership, but Tulloh only played the first two matches of the year and was not a part of the Grand Final-winning side. Tulloh had his best match for the Demons in round 13 of 1927, kicking seven goals, but the week after turned out to be his last match for the club.

=== St Kilda ===
Tulloh left Melbourne at the end of 1927 and joined St Kilda for the 1928 season, where he wore the number one guernsey. His stint with the Saints was largely unsuccessful, playing only three matches and kicking two goals in the one season he was on their list.

=== Brighton ===
Tulloh later moved to the Victorian Football Association to play for Brighton. He won Brighton's best and fairest award for the 1930 season.

== Cricket career ==
As well as being an avid footballer, Tulloh also played cricket to a high level. He played two season of district cricket with Melbourne Cricket Club in 1923/24 and 1924/25. Tulloh later played several seasons of sub-district cricket with Malvern, beginning in the 1926/27 season.
