= Keith 'Bluey' Truscott Trophy =

Annual Australian Football League award

- Awarded for: The best and fairest player at the Melbourne Football Club
- Location: Crown Palladium
- Country: Australia
- Presented by: Melbourne Football Club

History
- First award: 1935
- First winner: Allan La Fontaine
- Most wins: Allan La Fontaine; Jim Stynes; Clayton Oliver; Max Gawn (4 times)
- Most recent: Max Gawn (2026)

The Keith 'Bluey' Truscott Trophy is an Australian rules football award presented annually to the player(s) adjudged the best and fairest at the Melbourne Football Club throughout the Victorian Football League/Australian Football League (VFL/AFL) season. The Melbourne Football Club was established in 1858 and was a foundation member of the Victorian Football Association, playing in the league from 1877 to 1896. After the formation of the Victorian Football League in 1896, Melbourne joined the league as a foundation club the next year and has competed in the league ever since. The inaugural Melbourne best and fairest winner was Allan La Fontaine in 1935, and he retained it the following season. The award was known as the Melbourne best and fairest until it was renamed in 1943 in honour of Keith 'Bluey' Truscott, a former dual premiership player and World War II fighter ace killed in service in 1943.

Allan La Fontaine, Jim Stynes and Clayton Oliver have each won the award on four occasions in 1935, 1936, 1941 and 1942; 1991, 1995, 1996 and 1997 and 2017, 2019, 2021 and 2022, respectively; it is the most for any recipient of the award. Jim Stynes and Nathan Jones are the only two players to have won the award in three consecutive seasons: in the 1995–1997 seasons and 2012–2014 seasons, respectively. Two players have won the Keith 'Bluey' Truscott Trophy in the same season as winning the Brownlow Medal, which is awarded to the fairest and best player in the VFL/AFL, Jim Stynes in 1991 and Shane Woewodin in 2000. The voting system as of the 2016 AFL season, consists of four members of the match committee giving each player a ranking out of ten after each game. Players can receive a maximum of 40 votes for a game.

== Recipients ==
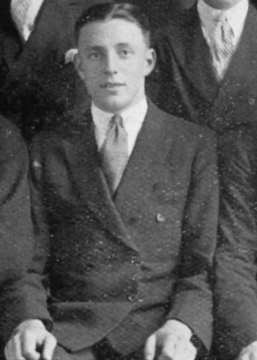
Allan La Fontaine, the winner of four best and fairests

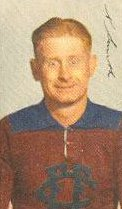
Norm Smith, two-time Keith 'Bluey' Truscott Trophy winner and Melbourne and Australian Football Hall of Fame legend

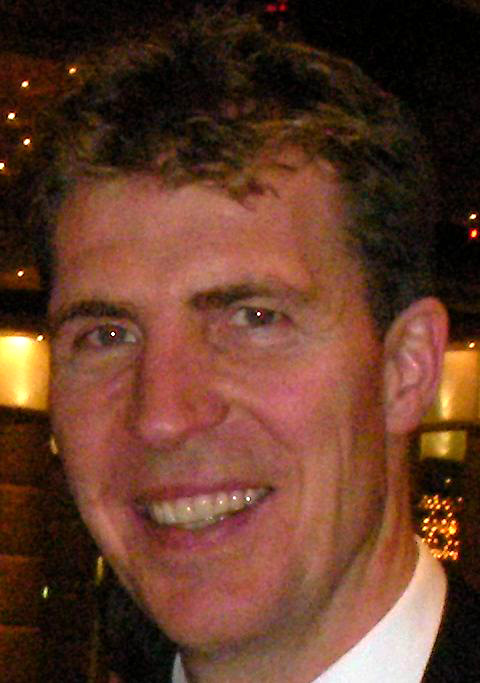
Jim Stynes, the winner of four Keith 'Bluey' Truscott Trophies, including three consecutive from 1995–1997

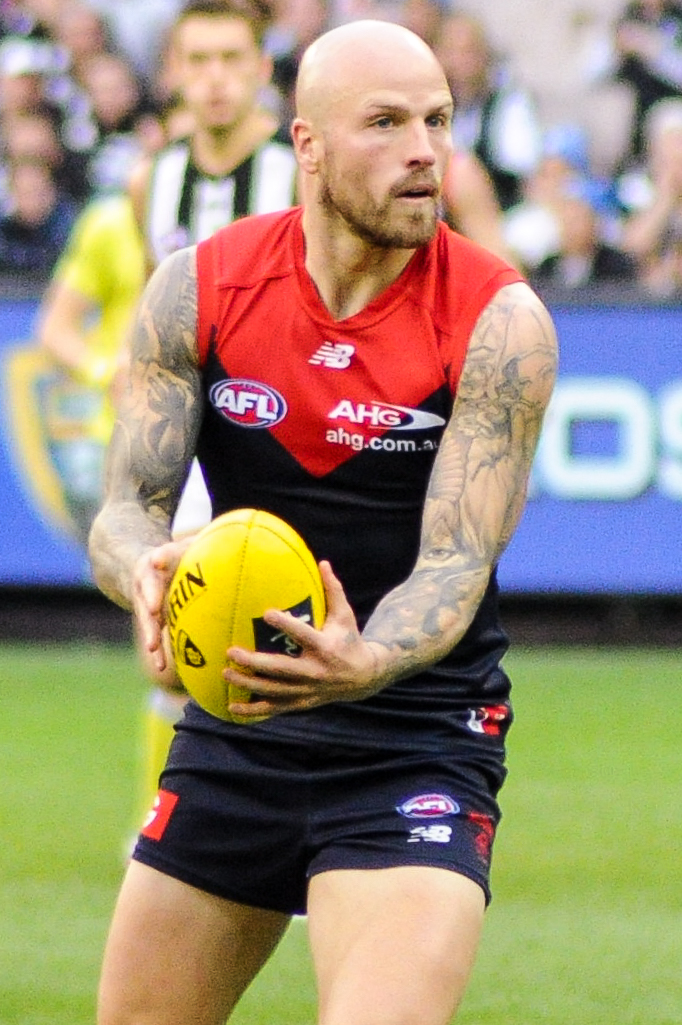
Nathan Jones, the winner of three Keith 'Bluey' Truscott Trophies in consecutive seasons from 2012–2014

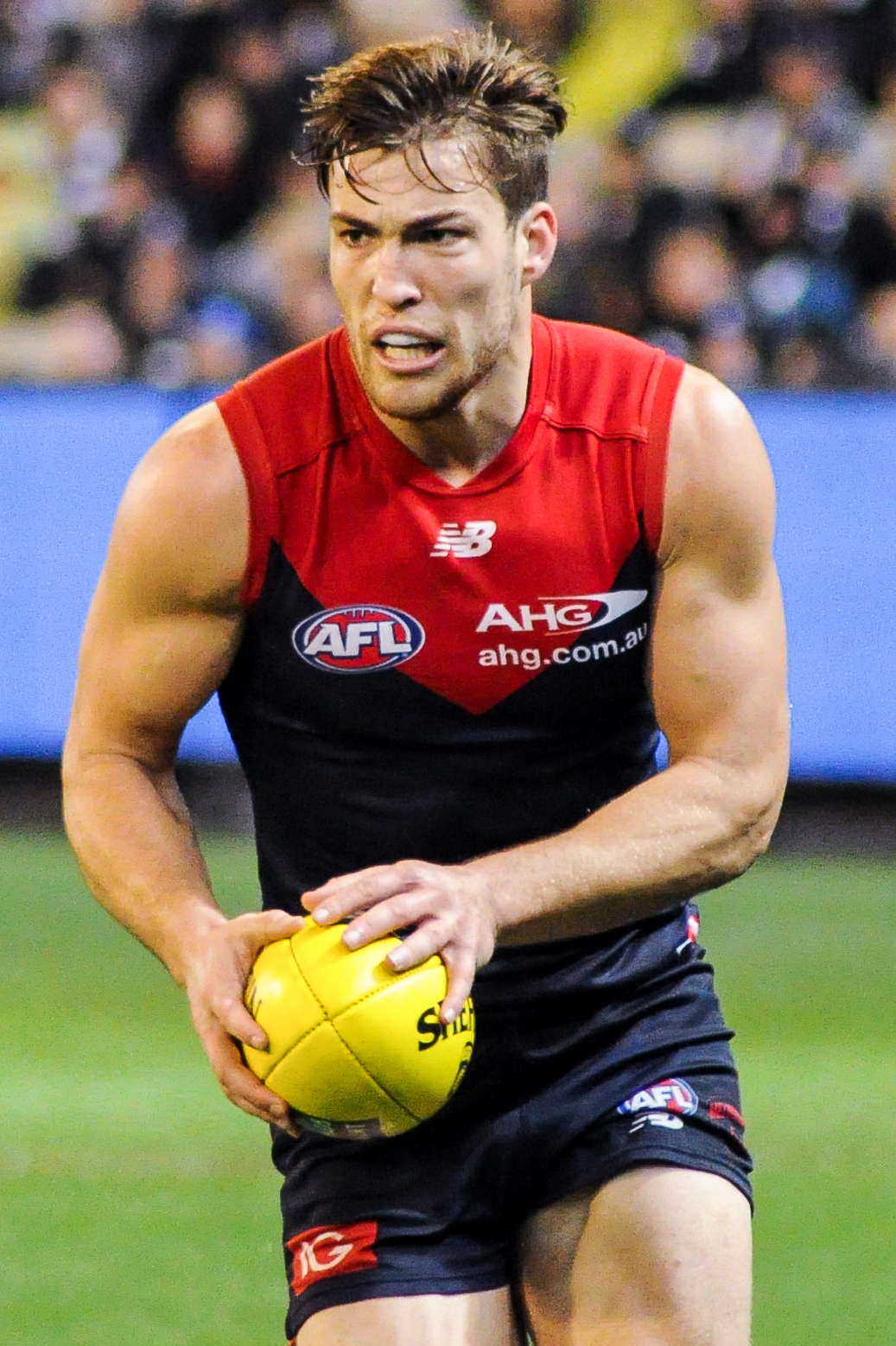
Jack Viney, the 2016 Keith 'Bluey' Truscott winner

^	Denotes current player
+	Player won Brownlow Medal in same season

Season	Recipient	Votes^{[b]}	Runner up^{[a]}	Votes^{[b]}	Ref
1935	Allan La Fontaine	—	—	—	
1936	Allan La Fontaine (2)	—	—	—	
1937	Jack Mueller	—	—	—	
1938	Norm Smith	—	Don Cordner	—	
1939	Jack Mueller (2)	—	—	—	
1940	Ron Baggott	—	—	—	
1941	Allan La Fontaine (3)	—	—	—	
1942	Allan La Fontaine (4)	—	—	—	
1943	Don Cordner	—	—	—	
1944	Norm Smith (2)	—	Don Cordner	—	
1945	Fred Fanning	—	Roy Dowsing	—	
1946	Jack Mueller (3)	—	—	—	
1947	Wally Lock	—	—	—	
1948	Alby Rodda	—	—	—	
1949	Len Dockett	—	Denis Cordner	—	
1950	Denis Cordner	—	Lance Arnold	—	
1951	Noel McMahen	—	Lance Arnold	—	
1952	Geoff McGivern	—	Denis Cordner	—	
1953	Ken Melville	—	Denis Cordner	—	
1954	Denis Cordner (2)	—	Noel McMahen	—	
1955	Stuart Spencer	69	Denis Cordner	68	
1956	Stuart Spencer (2)	87.5	John Beckwith	87	
1957	John Beckwith	—	Ron Barassi	—	
1958	Laurie Mithen	—	Don Williams	—	
1959	Laurie Mithen (2)	—	Ron Barassi	—	
1960	Brian Dixon	—	Ian Ridley	—	
1961	Ron Barassi	—	Frank Adams	—	
1962	Hassa Mann	—	Ron Barassi	—	
1963	Hassa Mann (2)	—	Ron Barassi	—	
1964	Ron Barassi (2)	—	Hassa Mann	—	
1965	John Townsend	—	Hassa Mann	—	
1966	Terry Leahy	—	Tassie Johnson	—	
1967	Hassa Mann (3)	—	Stan Alves	—	
1968	Ray Groom	—	Tassie Johnson	—	
1969	John Townsend (2)	—	Greg Parke	—	
1970	Frank Davis	—	Barry Bourke	—	
1971	Greg Wells	—	Paul Callery	—	
1972	Stan Alves	—	Greg Wells	—	
1973	Carl Ditterich	—	Greg Wells	—	
1974	Stan Alves (2)	—	Carl Ditterich	—	
1975	Laurie Fowler	—	Stan Alves	—	
1976	Greg Wells (2)	132	Laurie Fowler	121	
1977	Robert Flower	104	Shane Grambeau	92	
1978	Garry Baker	126	Greg Wells	96	
1979	Laurie Fowler (2)	118	Robert Flower	105	
1980	Laurie Fowler (3)	43	Robert Flower	41	
1981	Steven Smith	367	Brent Crosswell	250	
1982	Steven Icke	388	Robert Flower	324	
1983	Alan Johnson	402	Robert Flower	361	
1984	Gerard Healy	362	Peter Moore+	306	
1985	Danny Hughes	279	Gerard Healy	273	
1986	Greg Healy	237	Garry Lyon	172	
1987	Steven Stretch	342	Brian Wilson	320	
1988	Steven O'Dwyer	487	Brett Lovett	427	
1989	Alan Johnson (2)	278	Steven Stretch	207	
1990	Garry Lyon	301	Brett Lovett	271	
1991	Jim Stynes+	650	Todd Viney	449	
1992	Glenn Lovett	463	Andy Lovell	320	
1993	Todd Viney	394	Glenn Lovett	279	
1994	Garry Lyon (2)	355	Stephen Tingay	319	
1995	Jim Stynes (2)	311	David Neitz	272	
1996	Jim Stynes (3)	444	Alastair Clarkson	284	
1997	Jim Stynes (4)	404	Todd Viney	355	
1998	Todd Viney (2)	347	Adem Yze	323	
1999	David Schwarz	271	Shane Woewodin	270	
2000	Shane Woewodin+	341.5	Jeff White	328	
2001	Adem Yze	331	David Neitz	228	
2002	David Neitz	336	Cameron Bruce	295	
2003	Russell Robertson	267	James McDonald	240	
2004	Jeff White	287	Nathan Brown	286	
2005	Travis Johnstone	316	Russell Robertson	262	
2006	James McDonald	464	Cameron Bruce	317	
2007	James McDonald (2)	256	Nathan Jones	190	
2008	Cameron Bruce	75	Brock McLean	60	
2009	Aaron Davey	82	Brent Moloney	69	
2010	Brad Green	295	James Frawley	277	
2011	Brent Moloney	227	Jared Rivers	201	
2012	Nathan Jones	368	Jack Grimes	348	
2013	Nathan Jones (2)	365	Colin Garland	360	
2014	Nathan Jones (3)	311	Dom Tyson	293	
2015	Bernie Vince	328	Jack Viney^	327	
2016	Jack Viney^	407	Nathan Jones	399	
2017	Clayton Oliver	530	Jack Viney^	346	
2018	Max Gawn^	657	Clayton Oliver	595	
2019	Max Gawn^ (2)	464	Jack Viney^	323	
2019	Clayton Oliver (2)	464	Jack Viney^	323	
2020	Christian Petracca	385	Steven May	362	
2021	Clayton Oliver (3)	670	Christian Petracca	644	
2022	Clayton Oliver (4)	608	Christian Petracca	553	
2023	Christian Petracca (2)	607	Jack Viney^	527	
2024	Jack Viney^ (2)	407	Max Gawn^	405	
2025	Max Gawn^ (3)	592	Christian Petracca	479	
2026	Max Gawn^ (4)	680	Kysaiah Pickett	611	

== Multiple winners ==
^	Denotes current player

Player	Trophies	Seasons
Allan La Fontaine	4	1935, 1936, 1941, 1942
Jim Stynes	4	1991, 1995, 1996, 1997
Clayton Oliver	4	2017, 2019, 2021, 2022
Max Gawn^	4	2018, 2019, 2025, 2026
Laurie Fowler	3	1975, 1979, 1980
Nathan Jones	3	2012, 2013, 2014
Hassa Mann	3	1962, 1963, 1967
Jack Mueller	3	1937, 1939, 1946
Stan Alves	2	1972, 1974
Ron Barassi	2	1961, 1964
Denis Cordner	2	1950, 1954
Alan Johnson	2	1983, 1989
Garry Lyon	2	1990, 1994
James McDonald	2	2006, 2007
Laurie Mithen	2	1958, 1959
Christian Petracca	2	2020, 2023
Norm Smith	2	1938, 1944
Stuart Spencer	2	1955, 1956
John Townsend	2	1965, 1969
Jack Viney^	2	2016, 2024
Todd Viney	2	1993, 1998
Greg Wells	2	1971, 1976

== Footnotes ==
- ^{a} Records indicating the runners up are unavailable from 1935–1937, 1939–1943 and 1946–1948.
- ^{b} Records indicating the votes the winner and runner up received are unavailable from 1935–1954 and 1957–1975.
