= James Cardwell =

James Cardwell or Jim Cardwell is the name of:

- James Cardwell (actor) (1921–1954), American actor, born Albert Cardwell
- James B. Cardwell (1922–2012), American bureaucrat
- James F. Cardwell, film producer and former president of Warner Home Video
- James Moss Cardwell (1926–1990), American author who used the pen name Adobe James
- Jim Cardwell (1916–1996), Australian footballer
