= Russell Robertson =

Australian rules footballer, born 1978

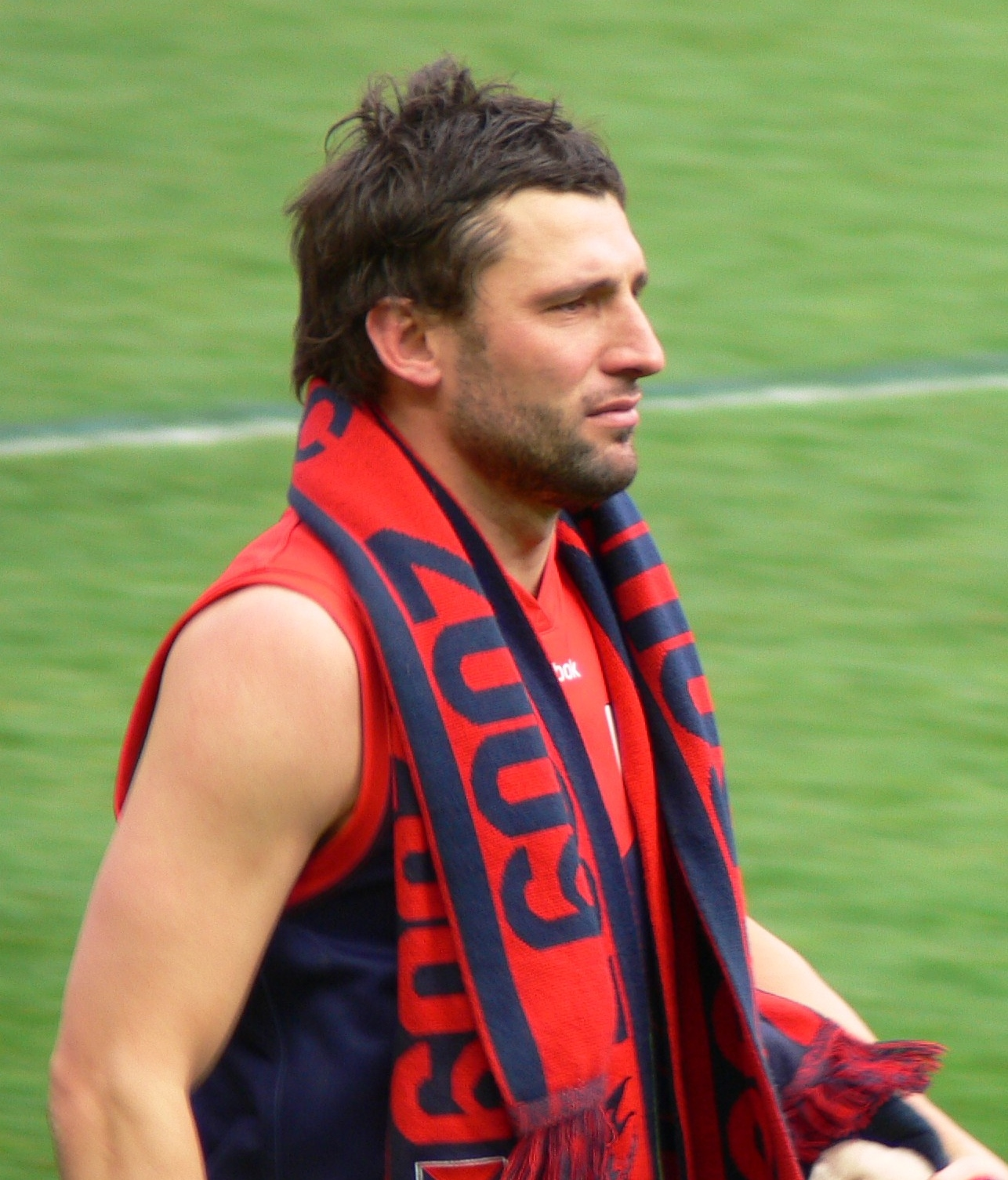
- Robertson after his last game in August 2009

Personal information
- Born: 24 November 1978 (age 47); Tasmania
- Original team: Tasmania U18s
- Debut: Round 20, 15 August 1997, Melbourne vs. West Coast Eagles, at W.A.C.A. Ground
- Height: 187 cm (6 ft 2 in)
- Weight: 91 kg (201 lb)

Playing career^{1}
Years	Club	Games (Goals)
1997–2009	Melbourne	228 (428)
- ^{1} Playing statistics correct to the end of 2009.

Career highlights
- Keith 'Bluey' Truscott Medallist: 2003; 4× Melbourne leading goalkicker: 2001, 2005, 2007, 2009; AFL Rising Star nominee: 1998

Russell "Robbo" Robertson (born 24 November 1978) is a former professional Australian rules footballer, who last played for the Melbourne Football Club.

Robertson is one of the Melbourne's great goalkickers, being one of just four players in the club's history to have led the goalkicking in four or more seasons. Robertson is well known for his ability to take regular spectacular marks.

Late in his career he was also known outside the football community, through reality television appearances, modelling and singing.

== Early life ==
Robertson grew up in the small town of Penguin, Tasmania, where he attended high school between 1991 and 1994.

He played his early football in nearby Burnie, Tasmania and recruiters first spotted him in a home video featured on The Footy Show's "Almost Footy Legends" segment. He was added to the Melbourne Football Club rookie list and seen as a potential player.

== AFL career ==
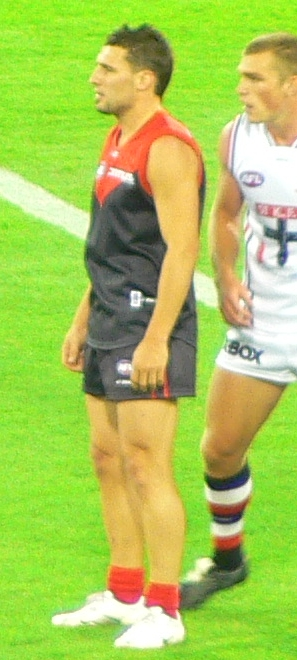
St Kilda's Leigh Fisher manning up on Russell Robertson

Robertson made his debut in the 1997 season. He did not take long to find his feet and became known as one of the game's most exciting forwards, taking numerous "Marks of the Week" (putting him in the running for Mark of the Year, however he never won the award). Robertson is known for his sometimes miraculous snap shots at goal as much as his accurate set shot kicking and was a regular feature in the Melbourne's senior side for well over a decade.

It was not until the 2005 season that Robertson became one of the Demons star players and regularly among the leading goalkicker list. Despite being short for a full-forward, Robertson became the second option in the key position to David Neitz.

In 2005, he played for Australia in his first International Rules series against Ireland.

He was unlucky to miss All-Australian selection despite finishing third in the Coleman medal. In that year he took out the Demons' leading goalkicker award.

In the same season he achieved a personal best haul of 7 goals against Geelong in round 20.

Robertson's 2006 season was hampered by soft tissue injuries.

In 2007, he started the season strongly, kicking a handful of goals against the Saints in the Demons 31-point loss, including a miraculous snap shot whilst sitting on the ground in the goal square. In Round 2 against the Hawks on Easter Monday, Robertson landed awkwardly while trying to take one of his trademark high flying marks and injured the medial ligament in his knee, along with David Neitz who suffered the same injury, and missed up to 7 weeks of football. However he still finished the season as the club's leading goalkicker, for the third time. Returning from injury, Robertson hit back to his best, kicking 7 goals against Collingwood in the traditional Queen's Birthday game at the MCG in Round 11.

On 1 June 2008, Robertson snapped his achilles tendon in what could have been a season-ending, and a career threatening, injury. He was added to the veterans list by the club in an effort to extend his career.

Robertson returned for Melbourne playing against Geelong on 3 May, 2009 at the Melbourne Cricket Ground. Robertson performed well in his return, kicking three goals.

On 20 August 2009, Robertson announced that he would be playing his last match with the Demons in season 2009 having been advised that his contract would not be renewed. After 13 seasons and 226 games, the 30-year-old and the club agreed to part ways. Robertson also announced that he would nominate for the 2009 AFL National Draft and 2010 pre-season draft, saying that he felt he still had some good footy left in him and as keen to play on for at least one more year.

He played most of the 2010 season in the Goulburn Valley Football League, one of the top country leagues in Australia and kicked a record 106 goals for Shepparton Swans Football Club.

In late 2010 he signed to be the playing-coach for St Josephs in the Geelong Football League.

In 2012 and 2013, he signed to be a fly-in player for Burnie in the Tasmanian Football League. Russell played in the 2013 Grand Final against South Launceston.

In 2016, Russell signed on to play at the Kangaroo Flat Football Club of the Bendigo Football Netball League.

In the second half of 2016 and the start of 2017, he is currently playing for the Toora and District Football Club.

== Statistics ==
Legend
G	Goals	K	Kicks	D	Disposals	T	Tackles
B	Behinds	H	Handballs	M	Marks

Season	Team	No.	Games	Totals							Averages (per game)						
Season	Team	No.	Games	G	B	K	H	D	M	T	G	B	K	H	D	M	T
1997	Melbourne	42	3	5	3	19	13	32	10	6	1.7	1.0	6.3	4.3	10.7	3.3	2.0
1998	Melbourne	24	16	15	16	90	58	148	41	11	0.9	1.0	5.6	3.6	9.3	2.6	0.7
1999	Melbourne	24	13	11	11	65	38	103	36	3	0.8	0.8	5.0	2.9	7.9	2.8	0.2
2000	Melbourne	24	25	44	31	225	100	325	131	21	1.8	1.2	9.0	4.0	13.0	5.2	0.8
2001	Melbourne	24	22	42	26	194	69	263	101	17	1.9	1.2	8.8	3.1	12.0	4.6	0.8
2002	Melbourne	24	21	32	28	186	51	237	114	28	1.5	1.3	8.9	2.4	11.3	5.4	1.3
2003	Melbourne	24	22	41	29	220	89	309	125	23	1.9	1.3	10.0	4.0	14.0	5.7	1.0
2004	Melbourne	24	22	30	29	214	99	313	113	36	1.4	1.3	9.7	4.5	14.2	5.1	1.6
2005	Melbourne	24	23	73	30	207	58	265	134	28	3.2	1.3	9.0	2.5	11.5	5.8	1.2
2006	Melbourne	24	23	44	28	190	52	242	106	28	1.9	1.2	8.3	2.3	10.5	4.6	1.2
2007	Melbourne	24	15	42	28	139	30	169	85	10	2.8	1.9	9.3	2.0	11.3	5.7	0.7
2008	Melbourne	24	10	20	13	96	20	116	57	8	2.0	1.3	9.6	2.0	11.6	5.7	0.8
2009	Melbourne	24	13	29	21	97	22	119	59	18	2.2	1.6	7.5	1.7	9.2	4.5	1.4
Career			228	428	293	1942	699	2641	1112	237	1.9	1.3	8.5	3.1	11.6	4.9	1.0

== Non-football activities ==
Outside of football, Robertson is a musician, who has abilities in singing and playing guitar, modelling and has become somewhat of a television personality.

He was featured in The Footy Show "Screamers" talent quest competition.

Robertson released an album titled Higher in 2008.

On 26 October 2006, Robertson married former Melbourne Storm cheerleader and aspiring actress Brooke Aust.

In February 2008, he was a contestant on the Australian television show Deal or No Deal.

Robertson also made an appearance in 2008 singing on the Australian television show It Takes Two with partner Kate Ceberano in which they were runners-up.

In 2012, Robertson re-joined the Melbourne Football Club to produce his own show, The Robbo Show, for the Melbourne FC website and is a regular MC at home matches at the MCG. He took over the role of Club Development Manager after the suspension and subsequent sacking of Chris Connolly for his role in the Melbourne tanking scandal.

In 2012, Robertson starred in Barassi, a stage show about Ron Barassi.

In 2018, Robertson sung a drawn-out and off-key version of the Australian National Anthem at the VFL Grand Final.

In September 2018, Robertson was a football consultant, and appeared in Season 1, episode 2, on the Australian drama Playing for Keeps.

== Discography ==
List of albums, with selected details and chart positions
Title	Details	Peak chart positions
Title	Details	AUS
Higher	Released: 2008; Label: Universal Music Australia; Format: CD	88
