= Robert Flower =

Australian rules footballer

Personal information
- Full name: Robert Alan Flower
- Nickname: Tulip
- Born: 5 August 1955; Melbourne
- Died: 2 October 2014 (aged 59)
- Original team: Murrumbeena

Playing career^{1}
Years	Club	Games (Goals)
1973–1987	Melbourne	272 (315)
- ^{1} Playing statistics correct to the end of 1987.

Career highlights
- Club: Keith 'Bluey' Truscott Medallist: 1977; 3x Melbourne leading Goalkicker: 1979, 1983, 1987: Harold Ball Memorial Trophy: 1973; Melbourne captain: 1981–1987; Melbourne Team of the Century – Wing; Melbourne Hall of Fame; Overall: Australian Football Hall of Fame; 15 x Victorian representative. Victorian captain 1983: 2× All-Australian: 1980, 1983; VFL team of the year 1982, 1983, 1984; 3rd Brownlow Medal: 1979 & 1984; Age Footballer of the Year : 1979

Robert Alan Flower (5 August 1955 – 2 October 2014) was an Australian rules footballer with Melbourne Football Club. His first game was against Geelong in 1973 and he captained the team from 1981 until his final game in 1987. He held the record for the number of games for his club, 272, until overtaken by David Neitz in 2006.

== Football career ==
In a radio interview in July 2006 conducted by the Coodabeen Champions, Flower stated that the club secretary Jim Cardwell rang to offer him the number 2 guernsey before his first senior game, an unofficial statement that the club saw great potential in the seventeen-year-old.

Known as "Tulip", he was a wingman for most of his career and was characterised by his ability to create space for himself and kick and handpass the ball with extraordinary accuracy. He possessed speed, sure-footedness and unrivalled tactical awareness.

In the documentary Red & Blue: The History of the Melbourne Football Club (1939–2005), Ian Ridley said of Flower, "Taking into account poise, ability, skill and marking, kicking, handballing...it doesn't matter what you refer to, but Robert Flower is the greatest footballer that I have seen in my life."

In Ken Piesse's The Complete Guide to Australian Football, Flower's player summary quotes Brent Crosswell: "...beat Flower and you could just about retire from League Football because anything else smacked of anti-climax." Wayne Schimmelbusch in the same publication said: "I paid more attention to Robert Flower than any other opponent."

Jim Main and Russell Holmesby mention Flower's thin physique and low playing weight—68 kilograms. It was assumed early in his career that he could not succeed because of his "wiry" frame. He sustained injuries that kept him from appearing in another 52 games, but he still played 272 out of a possible 324 games, and he was never omitted from the senior side when available.

=== Final season ===
Towards the end of the 1986 season, as Flower completed his 14th season without playing in a final, the Melbourne Football Club placed newspaper advertisements requesting donations from the public to enable the club to recruit a high-profile player under the headline "Please give Robbie one last chance to play in a final". Despite raising less money than expected, Melbourne did reach the 1987 finals after a dramatic final round.

His final three games were the only time Flower played in the finals. His last game was against Hawthorn in the preliminary final. Although Melbourne had led for the entire match, a free kick and a 15-metre penalty awarded after the final siren—via a Jim Stynes infraction—saw Hawthorn's Gary Buckenara kick the winning goal. Flower recalls in his autobiography Robbie that he started to run from the ground and paused to see the ball go through the goal and then went to the dressing rooms where he threw a can of drink against the wall in anger. Flower was injured in the game, and his ability to play in the grand final, had Melbourne won, was not certain.

== Playing statistics ==
Legend
G	Goals	K	Kicks	D	Disposals	T	Tackles
B	Behinds	H	Handballs	M	Marks

Season	Team	No.	Games	Totals							Averages (per game)						
Season	Team	No.	Games	G	B	K	H	D	M	T	G	B	K	H	D	M	T
1973	Melbourne	2	13	4	7	181	43	224	63	—N/a	0.3	0.5	13.9	3.3	17.2	4.8	—N/a
1974	Melbourne	2	18	22	14	196	68	264	67	—N/a	1.2	0.8	10.9	3.8	14.7	3.7	—N/a
1975	Melbourne	2	20	14	14	277	58	335	77	—N/a	0.7	0.8	14.6	3.1	17.6	4.1	—N/a
1976	Melbourne	2	19	17	19	248	123	371	103	—N/a	0.9	1.0	13.1	6.5	19.5	5.4	—N/a
1977	Melbourne	2	20	23	11	254	141	395	98	—N/a	1.2	0.6	12.7	7.1	19.8	4.9	—N/a
1978	Melbourne	2	22	18	21	304	113	417	114	—N/a	0.8	1.0	13.8	5.1	19.0	5.2	—N/a
1979	Melbourne	2	21	33	29	285	196	481	103	—N/a	1.6	1.4	13.6	9.3	22.9	4.9	—N/a
1980	Melbourne	2	22	21	26	275	217	492	127	—N/a	1.0	1.2	12.5	9.9	22.4	5.8	—N/a
1981	Melbourne	2	16	5	3	182	124	306	68	—N/a	0.3	0.2	11.4	7.8	19.1	4.3	—N/a
1982	Melbourne	2	21	25	26	264	188	452	117	—N/a	1.2	1.2	12.6	9.0	21.5	5.6	—N/a
1983	Melbourne	2	20	40	24	267	147	414	116	—N/a	2.0	1.2	13.4	7.4	20.7	5.8	—N/a
1984	Melbourne	2	21	28	18	229	162	391	102	—N/a	1.3	0.9	10.9	7.7	18.6	4.9	—N/a
1985	Melbourne	2	3	3	2	30	17	47	11	—N/a	1.0	0.7	10.0	5.7	15.7	3.7	—N/a
1986	Melbourne	2	16	15	11	152	78	230	64	—N/a	0.9	0.7	9.5	4.9	14.4	4.0	—N/a
1987	Melbourne	2	20	47	31	215	60	275	91	25	2.4	1.6	10.8	3.0	13.8	4.6	1.3
Career			272	315	256	3359	1735	5094	1321	25	1.2	1.0	12.4	6.4	18.8	4.9	1.3

== Post-football career ==
After retiring as a player, Flower was inducted in the Australian Football Hall of Fame in 1996 and was named on the wing in Melbourne's Team of the Century. He later served on the Melbourne board until he resigned after being diagnosed with cardiomyopathy in 2004. He had subsequently been diagnosed with prostate cancer in 2001.

== Personal life ==
His younger brother Tom Flower played 26 games for Melbourne over three seasons in the late 1970s. Robert's son, Brad, was considered a possible father–son selection in 2003 after playing for Sandringham Football Club, but he was overlooked and was never recruited to an AFL team.

Flower died on 2 October 2014 after a brief illness.

== Books ==
- Robbie by Robert Flower with Ron Reed (1987). Caribou Publications.
- Ken Piesse The Complete Guide to Australian Football Pan Macmillan Australia (1995) ISBN 0-330-35712-3.
- Main, J. & Holmesby, R. Encyclopedia of AFL Football Players AFL Publishing (2005) ISBN 1-920910-38-7.
