= List of Melbourne Football Club leading goalkickers =

The following is a list of Melbourne Football Club leading goalkickers in each season of the Australian Football League (formerly the Victorian Football League) and AFL Women's.

== VFL/AFL ==
| ^ | Denotes current player |
| + | Player won Coleman Medal/VFL Leading Goalkicker Medal in same season |

| Season | Player(s) | Goals |
|---|---|---|
| 1897 | Jack Leith+ | 22 |
| 1898 | Charlie Young | 21 |
| 1899 | Jack Leith (2) | 21 |
| 1900 | Tommy Ryan | 24 |
| 1901 | Frank Langley | 17 |
| 1902 | Jack Leith (3) | 26 |
| 1903 | Vince Coutie | 19 |
| 1904 | Vince Coutie+ (2) | 39 |
| 1905 | Harry Cordner | 16 |
| 1906 | Basil Onyons | 16 |
| 1907 | Jack Leith (4) | 27 |
| 1908 | Vince Coutie (3) | 37 |
| 1909 | Harry Brereton | 34 |
| 1910 | Stan Fairbairn | 24 |
| 1911 | Harry Brereton+ (2) | 46 |
| 1912 | Harry Brereton+ (3) | 56 |
| 1913 | Mick Maguire | 13 |
| 1914 | Arthur Best | 30 |
| 1915 | Roy Park | 35 |
| 1919 | George Heinz | 15 |
| 1920 | Harry Harker | 23 |
| 1921 | Harry Harker (2) | 47 |
| 1922 | Harry Harker (3) | 47 |
| 1923 | Percy Tulloh | 31 |
| 1924 | Percy Tulloh (2) | 24 |
| 1925 | Harry Davie | 56 |
| 1926 | Harry Moyes | 55 |
| 1927 | Harry Davie (2) | 40 |
| 1928 | Bob Johnson | 55 |
| 1929 | Dick Taylor | 30 |
| 1930 | George Margitich | 73 |
| 1931 | George Margitich (2) | 66 |
| 1932 | George Margitich (3) | 60 |
| 1933 | Bob Johnson (2) | 62 |
| 1934 | Jack Mueller | 52 |
| 1935 | Maurie Gibb | 59 |
| 1936 | Eric Glass | 56 |
| 1937 | Ron Baggott | 51 |
| 1938 | Norm Smith | 80 |
| 1939 | Norm Smith (2) | 54 |
| 1940 | Norm Smith (3) | 86 |
| 1941 | Norm Smith (4) | 89 |
| 1942 | Fred Fanning | 37 |
| 1943 | Fred Fanning+ (2) | 62 |
| 1944 | Fred Fanning+ (3) | 87 |
| 1945 | Fred Fanning+ (4) | 67 |
| 1946 | Jack Mueller (2) | 58 |
| 1947 | Fred Fanning+ (5) | 97 |
| 1948 | Lance Arnold | 41 |
| 1949 | Bob McKenzie | 40 |
| 1950 | Denis Cordner | 36 |
| 1951 | Bob McKenzie (2) | 40 |
| 1952 | Noel Clarke | 49 |
| 1953 | Bob McKenzie (3) | 38 |
| 1954 | Noel Clarke (2) | 51 |
| 1955 | Stuart Spencer | 34 |
| 1956 | Bob Johnson | 43 |
| 1957 | Athol Webb | 56 |
| 1958 | Ron Barassi, Jr. | 44 |
| 1958 | Athol Webb (2) | 44 |
| 1959 | Ron Barassi, Jr. (2) | 46 |
| 1960 | Ian Ridley | 38 |
| 1961 | Bob Johnson | 36 |
| 1962 | Laurie Mithen | 37 |
| 1963 | Barry Bourke | 48 |
| 1964 | John Townsend | 35 |
| 1965 | John Townsend (2) | 34 |
| 1966 | Barrie Vagg | 20 |
| 1967 | Hassa Mann | 38 |
| 1968 | Hassa Mann (2) | 29 |
| 1969 | Ross Dillon | 48 |
| 1970 | Ross Dillon (2) | 41 |
| 1971 | Paul Callery | 38 |
| 1972 | Greg Parke | 63 |
| 1973 | Ross Brewer | 32 |
| 1974 | Ross Brewer (2) | 40 |
| 1975 | Greg Wells | 32 |
| 1976 | Ray Biffin | 47 |
| 1977 | Ross Brewer (3) | 63 |
| 1978 | Henry Coles | 33 |
| 1979 | Robert Flower | 33 |
| 1980 | Brent Crosswell | 31 |
| 1981 | Mark Jackson | 76 |
| 1982 | Gerard Healy | 77 |
| 1983 | Robert Flower (2) | 40 |
| 1984 | Kelvin Templeton | 51 |
| 1985 | Brian Wilson | 40 |
| 1986 | Greg Healy | 35 |
| 1987 | Robert Flower (3) | 47 |
| 1988 | Ricky Jackson | 43 |
| 1989 | Darren Bennett | 34 |
| 1990 | Darren Bennett (2) | 87 |
| 1991 | Allen Jakovich | 71 |
| 1992 | Allen Jakovich (2) | 40 |
| 1993 | Allen Jakovich (3) | 39 |
| 1994 | Garry Lyon | 79 |
| 1995 | Garry Lyon (2) | 77 |
| 1996 | David Neitz | 56 |
| 1997 | David Neitz (2) | 30 |
| 1997 | Jeff Farmer | 30 |
| 1998 | Jeff Farmer (2) | 47 |
| 1999 | David Neitz (3) | 46 |
| 2000 | Jeff Farmer (3) | 76 |
| 2001 | Russell Robertson | 42 |
| 2002 | David Neitz+ (4) | 82 |
| 2003 | David Neitz (5) | 65 |
| 2004 | David Neitz (6) | 69 |
| 2005 | Russell Robertson (2) | 73 |
| 2006 | David Neitz (7) | 68 |
| 2007 | Russell Robertson (3) | 42 |
| 2008 | Brad Miller | 26 |
| 2009 | Russell Robertson (4) | 29 |
| 2010 | Brad Green | 55 |
| 2011 | Liam Jurrah | 40 |
| 2012 | Mitch Clark | 29 |
| 2013 | Jeremy Howe | 28 |
| 2014 | Chris Dawes | 20 |
| 2015 | Jesse Hogan | 44 |
| 2016 | Jesse Hogan (2) | 41 |
| 2017 | Jeff Garlett | 42 |
| 2018 | Tom McDonald^ | 53 |
| 2019 | Christian Petracca | 22 |
| 2020 | Bayley Fritsch^ | 22 |
| 2021 | Bayley Fritsch^ (2) | 59 |
| 2022 | Bayley Fritsch^ (3) | 55 |
| 2023 | Bayley Fritsch^ (4) | 38 |
| 2024 | Bayley Fritsch^ (5) | 41 |
| 2025 | Kysaiah Pickett^ | 40 |
| 2026 | Jacob van Rooyen^ | 42 |

== AFL Women's ==
| ^ | Denotes current player |
| + | Player won AFL Women's leading goalkicker in same season |

| Season | Player(s) | Goals |
|---|---|---|
| 2017 | Alyssa Mifsud | 9 |
| 2018 | Tegan Cunningham | 9 |
| 2019 | Tegan Cunningham (2) | 8 |
| 2020 | Kate Hore^ | 5 |
| 2020 | Shelley Scott | 5 |
| 2021 | Kate Hore^ (2) | 12 |
| 2022 (S6) | Tayla Harris^ | 18 |
| 2022 (S7) | Kate Hore^ (3) | 17 |
| 2023 | Eden Zanker^+ | 23 |
| 2024 | Alyssa Bannan^ | 12 |
| 2025 | Kate Hore^ (4) | 24 |

Note: In 2023, the AFL Women's league leading goalkicker award (based on goals kicked during the home-and-away season) was shared by Melbourne players Kate Hore and Eden Zanker. However, as Zanker kicked more goals in finals, Hore did not lead the club's goalkicking that year.
