= David Neitz =

Australian rules footballer, born 1975

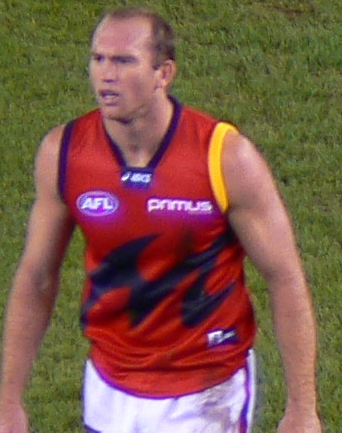

Personal information
- Full name: David Neitz
- Born: 22 January 1975 (age 51); Ulverstone, Tasmania
- Original team: Parkmore
- Height: 193 cm (6 ft 4 in)
- Weight: 100 kg (220 lb)
- Position: Full forward/centre half back

Playing career^{1}
Years	Club	Games (Goals)
1993–2008	Melbourne	306 (631)
- ^{1} Playing statistics correct to the end of 2008.

Career highlights
- Melbourne captain: 2000–2008; Keith 'Bluey' Truscott Medallist: 2002; Coleman Medallist: 2002; 7× Melbourne leading goalkicker: 1996, 1997 (equal), 1999, 2002, 2003, 2004, 2006; Melbourne all-time leading goalkicker.; Harold Ball Memorial Trophy: 1993; 2× All-Australian team: 1995, 2002; AFL Rising Star nominee: 1993; Melbourne Hall of Fame; Australian Football Hall of Fame

David Neitz (born 22 January 1975), is a retired Australian rules footballer. A strongly built forward, he debuted at 18 years old. In just his sixth senior game kicked 6 goals 6 behinds. In his 2nd year, with Melbourne's forward line consisting of Garry Lyon and David Schwarz, among others. He was shifted to the backline to fill a need, Neitz proved he was capable of playing both ends of the ground.

Neitz was the longest-serving captain in the history of the Melbourne Football Club and the first Melbourne player to achieve the 300-game milestone. He is considered one of the greatest ever players to come out of the island state of Tasmania.

Neitz was born in Ulverstone, Tasmania, he was groomed as a potential Australian Football League player from the age of 15 and targeted by the recruiters at the Melbourne Football Club, entering the AFL in 1993 as a key position player, he soon became one of Melbourne's best young prospects.

In 1994, Neitz was named to his first Victorian State of Origin team, and he went one step further in 1995 by making the All-Australian team as well as the Victorian side.

After the retirement of Demons great Garry Lyon, Neitz moved to the full-forward position and began his successful run as one of the AFL's elite goal scorers. He has led Melbourne's goalkicking seven times (1996, 1997 (equal), 1999, 2002, 2003, 2004 and 2006), and in 2002 won the prestigious Coleman Medal for leading the league in goals, making him not only the first Melbourne player to do so, but also the first Melbourne player to lead the competition's goalkicking since the 1940s. On 8 April 2005, Neitz became the 40th person in VFL/AFL history to kick 500 career goals.

Neitz was appointed captain of Melbourne in 2000, and on 8 April 2005 he broke the club record for most games captained (previously held by Garry Lyon with 112 games as captain). He has been an All-Australian in 1995 and 2002, and played for Australia in the 1998 International Rules Series and 2002 International Rules Series against Ireland. In 2002, Neitz also won his first Melbourne Best and Fairest Award, the Keith 'Bluey' Truscott Medal, along with the Coleman Medal, for kicking the most goals of any player in that season.

On 8 April 2005, Neitz played his 250th career AFL game, and in 2006 signed a two-year contract extension seeing him through to the end of 2007. Neitz became Melbourne's all-time leading goal-kicker on 19 May 2006, surpassing Norm Smith's previous record of 546 goals. Two weeks later, he broke Robert Flower's long standing record of 272 games, making him the longest serving Demon in history. He played his 300th AFL game for the Demons in the defeat against Collingwood on 17 August 2007. He is one of only two players to play as many games for the Melbourne Football Club, the other being Nathan Jones.

Neitz now sits on the AFL Tribunal jury, adjudicating on high-profile cases that arise during the regular season.

== Statistics ==
Legend
G	Goals	K	Kicks	D	Disposals	T	Tackles
B	Behinds	H	Handballs	M	Marks

Led the league for the season only
Led the league after finals only
Led the league after season and finals

Season	Team	No.	Games	Totals							Averages (per game)						
Season	Team	No.	Games	G	B	K	H	D	M	T	G	B	K	H	D	M	T
1993	Melbourne	38	20	17	15	161	96	257	94	12	0.9	0.8	8.1	4.8	12.9	4.7	0.6
1994	Melbourne	9	24	2	2	189	123	312	81	22	0.1	0.1	7.9	5.1	13.0	3.4	0.9
1995	Melbourne	9	22	33	25	232	67	299	140	18	1.5	1.1	10.5	3.0	13.6	6.4	0.8
1996	Melbourne	9	22	56	26	181	66	247	110	22	2.5	1.2	8.2	3.0	11.2	5.0	1.0
1997	Melbourne	9	17	30	22	129	34	163	77	9	1.8	1.3	7.6	2.0	9.6	4.5	0.5
1998	Melbourne	9	14	33	21	115	42	157	57	14	2.4	1.5	8.2	3.0	11.2	4.1	1.0
1999	Melbourne	9	18	46	21	153	51	204	92	17	2.6	1.2	8.5	2.8	11.3	5.1	0.9
2000	Melbourne	9	21	24	19	201	67	268	126	23	1.1	0.9	9.6	3.2	12.8	6.0	1.1
2001	Melbourne	9	22	38	34	206	61	267	132	21	1.7	1.5	9.4	2.8	12.1	6.0	1.0
2002	Melbourne	9	24	82	38	178	50	228	132	23	3.4	1.6	7.4	2.1	9.5	5.5	1.0
2003	Melbourne	9	22	65	28	147	38	185	101	22	3.0	1.3	6.7	1.7	8.4	4.6	1.0
2004	Melbourne	9	21	69	47	155	32	187	99	19	3.3	2.2	7.4	1.5	8.9	4.7	0.9
2005	Melbourne	9	18	39	23	118	27	145	67	20	2.2	1.3	6.6	1.5	8.1	3.7	1.1
2006	Melbourne	9	21	68	26	163	41	204	106	16	3.2	1.2	7.8	2.0	9.7	5.0	0.8
2007	Melbourne	9	15	26	16	100	33	133	68	6	1.7	1.1	6.7	2.2	8.9	4.5	0.4
2008	Melbourne	9	5	3	5	27	8	35	20	4	0.6	1.0	5.4	1.6	7.0	4.0	0.8
Career			306	631	368	2455	836	3291	1502	268	2.1	1.2	8.0	2.7	10.8	4.9	0.9

== Honours and achievements ==
**Brownlow Medal votes**
Season	Votes
1993	—
1994	2
1995	8
1996	10
1997	2
1998	—
1999	5
2000	6
2001	7
2002	11
2003	8
2004	10
2005	—
2006	10
2007	—
2008	—
**Total**	**79**
Key:
Green / **Bold** = Won

- **Individual**
  - Keith 'Bluey' Truscott Medal: 2002
  - Coleman Medal: 2002
  - Melbourne F.C. Captain: 2000-2008
  - All-Australian: 1995, 2002
  - Melbourne F.C. Leading Goalkicker: 1996–1997, 1999, 2002–2004, 2006
  - Australian Representative Honours in International Rules Football: 1998, 2002
  - AFL Rising Star Nominee: 1993 (Round 6)

== Retirement ==
Due to a broken disc in the back of his neck, and after playing only five games in 2008, he finally pulled the plug on his AFL career as he announced his immediate retirement on 19 May 2008. In the round nine 2008 match Melbourne vs Hawthorn after the match Neitz was given a standing ovation by the players and the fans. He ended his playing career with several Melbourne records that he'd broken during recent seasons, three in particular: Most games (one of only two players to play 300 games for Melbourne), most goals, and longest-serving captain.
