= Glenn Lovett =

Australian rules footballer

Personal information
- Full name: Glenn Lovett
- Born: 23 July 1969 (age 57)
- Original team: Melbourne High School
- Height: 180 cm (5 ft 11 in)
- Weight: 85 kg (187 lb)

Playing career^{1}
Years	Club	Games (Goals)
1987–1999	Melbourne	127 (74)
- ^{1} Playing statistics correct to the end of 1999.

Career highlights
- Keith 'Bluey' Truscott Medal: 1992

Glenn Lovett (born 23 July 1969) is a former Australian rules footballer who played for Melbourne in the VFL/AFL.

Lovett made his debut for Melbourne in 1987 but only managed seven games in his first three seasons. He did not cement his spot in the side until the 1990s. In 1992 he won the Keith 'Bluey' Truscott Medal for being Melbourne's best and fairest player and was runner up in 1993.

Lovett played only one game in the 1998 season battling hamstring injuries. Although he was named as vice-captain for 1999, he retired midway through the season.

Upon the end of his playing career, Lovett completed an MBA and began a successful career in sports business. He currently holds the position of President, Global Strategy, at REPUCOM, one of the world's leading sports marketing research companies.

== Playing statistics ==
Legend
G	Goals	K	Kicks	D	Disposals	T	Tackles
B	Behinds	H	Handballs	M	Marks

Season	Team	No.	Games	Totals							Averages (per game)						
Season	Team	No.	Games	G	B	K	H	D	M	T	G	B	K	H	D	M	T
1987	Melbourne	51	2	1	1	8	5	13	2	3	0.5	0.5	4.0	2.5	6.5	1.0	1.5
1988	Melbourne	6	0	—	—	—	—	—	—	—	—	—	—	—	—	—	—
1989	Melbourne	6	5	0	2	40	8	48	7	5	0.0	0.4	8.0	1.6	9.6	1.4	1.0
1990	Melbourne	6	10	3	5	97	19	116	31	15	0.3	0.5	9.7	1.9	11.6	3.1	1.5
1991	Melbourne	6	12	7	7	183	65	248	48	26	0.6	0.6	15.3	5.4	20.7	4.0	2.2
1992	Melbourne	6	18	12	7	307	130	437	108	34	0.7	0.4	17.1	7.2	24.3	6.0	1.9
1993	Melbourne	6	20	19	17	329	179	508	98	27	1.0	0.9	16.5	9.0	25.4	4.9	1.4
1994	Melbourne	6	11	11	7	133	92	225	39	17	1.0	0.6	12.1	8.4	20.5	3.5	1.5
1995	Melbourne	6	18	13	11	237	132	369	73	30	0.7	0.6	13.2	7.3	20.5	4.1	1.7
1996	Melbourne	6	15	4	9	185	126	311	54	28	0.3	0.6	12.3	8.4	20.7	3.6	1.9
1997	Melbourne	6	14	3	3	129	127	256	37	19	0.2	0.2	9.2	9.1	18.3	2.6	1.4
1998	Melbourne	6	1	0	0	3	4	7	2	0	0.0	0.0	3.0	4.0	7.0	2.0	0.0
1999	Melbourne	6	1	1	0	11	4	15	3	0	1.0	0.0	11.0	4.0	15.0	3.0	0.0
Career			127	74	69	1662	891	2553	502	204	0.6	0.5	13.1	7.0	20.1	4.0	1.6
