= Laurie Mithen =

Australian rules footballer (1934–2022)

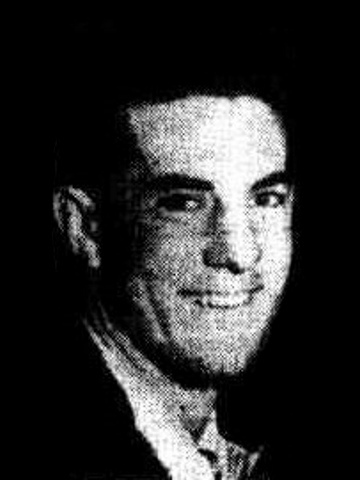
- Mithen in 1954

Personal information
- Full name: Lawrence Sidney Mithen
- Born: 15 April 1934
- Died: 2 February 2022 (aged 87)
- Original team: Ormond (VAFA)
- Height: 183 cm (6 ft 0 in)
- Weight: 83 kg (183 lb)

Playing career^{1}
Years	Club	Games (Goals)
1954–1962	Melbourne	153 (108)
1963–1965	Port Melbourne (VFA)	52
1966–1967	Claremont (WAFL)	34 (4)
Total		239 (112)
- ^{1} Playing statistics correct to the end of 1967.

Career highlights
- 5× VFL premierships: 1955, 1956, 1957, 1959, 1960; 2× Keith 'Bluey' Truscott Medallist: 1958, 1959; Melbourne leading goalkicker: 1962; Melbourne Team of the Century–interchange; Melbourne Hall of Fame

Lawrence Sidney Mithen (15 April 1934 – 2 February 2022) was an Australian rules footballer who played for Melbourne in the VFL during their successful period in the late 1950s under Norm Smith.

== Education ==
He was awarded a Bachelor of Arts from the University of Melbourne in April 1964. Laurie completed his doctoral dissertation while living in America receiving a PhD at the University of Oregon in 1975. The topic of his dissertation was the exploration and investigation into community-based education, what we would now call TAFE or community colleges, that was a relatively new concept and offered education to all age and socioeconomic groups. Laurie was a teacher at Melbourne High School and attended CBC as a child.

== Ormond (VAFA) ==
Playing for the Ormond Amateur Football Club in the Victorian Amateur Football Association, Mithen was the Association's best and fairest A Grade player in 1953.

== Melbourne (VFL) ==
Recruited from Ormond, he played in three consecutive premierships from 1955 to 1957 and was a premiership player again in 1959 and 1960 to finish with five.

Mithen played as a half forward early in his career before moving into the centre. It was as a centreman that he had most success, winning Melbourne's best and fairest in 1958 and 1959.

=== VFL representative ===
He was selected to play for Victoria in the 1958 ANFC Melbourne Carnival. In the only match (of a possible four) that he played in — the 7 July 1958 match against the VFA — he was completely outclassed by the VFA centreman, Bob Withers.

=== Team of the Century ===
He was named on the interchange bench in the Melbourne's official 'Team of the Century'.

== Port Melbourne (VFA) ==
In 1963, he moved to the Port Melbourne Football Club in the VFA and was the team's captain-coach from 1963 to 1965, during which time, he played 52 games, and the club won the 1964 Premiership.

== Claremont (WAFL) ==
He played for Claremont Football Club in the WAFL in 1966 and 1967 for a total of 34 games.

== Death ==
On 2 February 2022, it was announced that Mithen had died, at the age of 87.
