= Christian Petracca =

Australian rules footballer (born 1996)

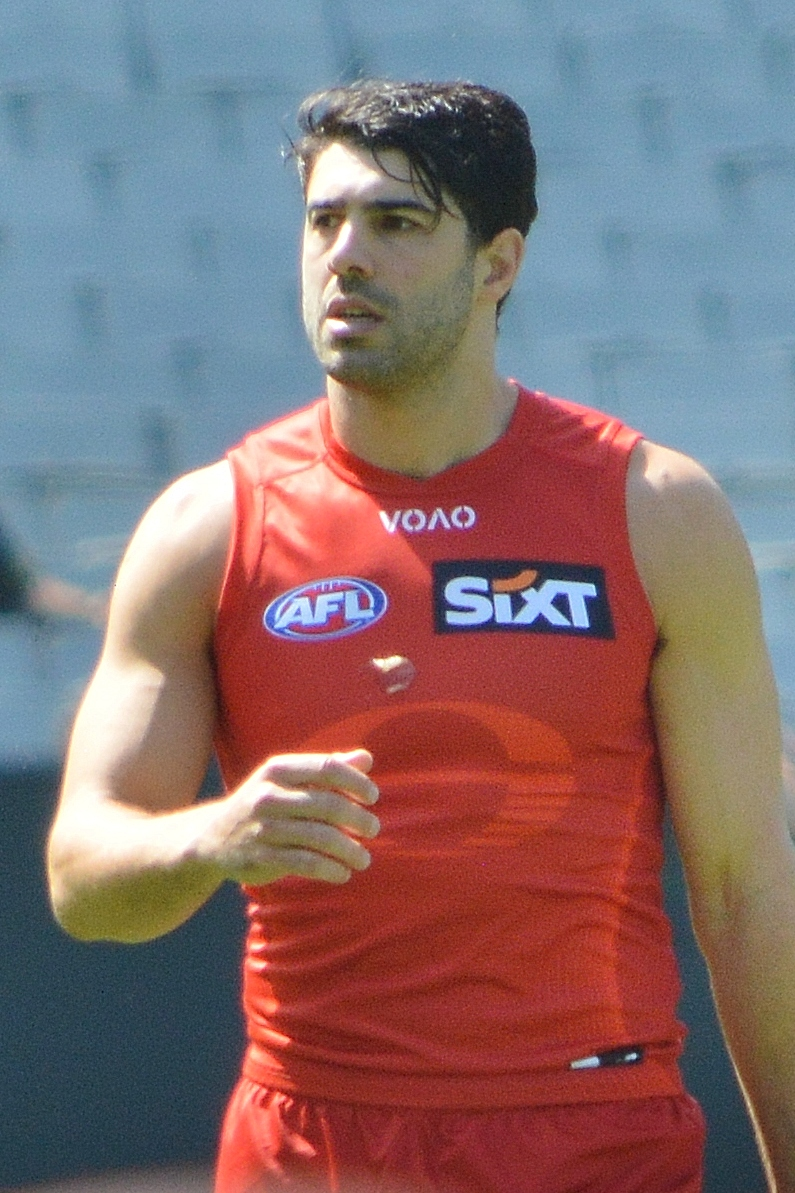
- Petracca pre-match with Gold Coast in 2026

Personal information
- Full name: Christian Petracca
- Nickname: Trac
- Born: 4 January 1996 (age 30)
- Original team: Eastern Ranges (TAC Cup)
- Draft: No. 2, 2014 national draft
- Debut: Round 6, 2016, Melbourne vs. St Kilda, at Etihad Stadium
- Height: 187 cm (6 ft 2 in)
- Weight: 94 kg (207 lb)
- Position: Midfielder / forward

Club information
- Current club: Gold Coast
- Number: 3

Playing career^{1}
Years	Club	Games (Goals)
2015–2025	Melbourne	212 (202)
2026–	Gold Coast	20 (22)
Total		232 (224)
- ^{1} Playing statistics correct to the end of the 2026 season.

Career highlights
- AFL premiership player: 2021; Norm Smith Medal: 2021; 4× All-Australian team: 2020, 2021, 2022, 2023; 2× Keith 'Bluey' Truscott Trophy: 2020, 2023; Melbourne leading goalkicker: 2019; Frank 'Checker' Hughes Medal: 2021; Neale Daniher Trophy: 2017; AFL Rising Star nominee: 2016

Christian Petracca (/pɛˈtrɑːkə/ peh-TRAH-ka; born 4 January 1996) is a professional Australian rules footballer playing for the Gold Coast Suns in the Australian Football League (AFL). He previously played for the Melbourne Football Club from 2015 to 2025. A midfielder, 1.87 metres (6 ft 2 in) tall and weighing 98 kilograms (216 lb), Petracca has the ability to play dual-positions as a forward and a midfielder both on the inside and outside.

Petracca had a standout junior basketball career where he played in the Victorian under-16 side, and he was named in the Australian under-18 squad. He entered top-level football early when he played for Victoria at under-12 level, and he represented them throughout his junior career, culminating in selection for Vic Metro in the 2014 AFL Under 18 Championships. In addition, he joined the TAC Cup competition as a bottom-aged player. His achievements as a junior included winning the Larke Medal, the most valuable player at state level, and selection in the All-Australian and TAC Cup Team of the Year sides. Petracca was recruited by Melbourne with the second selection in the 2014 AFL draft. He made his AFL debut in 2016 after missing all of 2015 with a knee injury and received an AFL Rising Star nomination in round 9.

== Early life ==
Petracca was born to Elvira and Tony Petracca on 4 January 1996 and is of Italian heritage. His father was born in the southern Italian city of Potenza. He and his family lived in the Melbourne suburb of Warrandyte. He was recognised as an adept footballer at a young age when he represented Victoria at under-12 level. He played his junior football with the Park Orchards Sharks, Warrandyte Bloods and Beverley Hills Junior Football Club. He also played for his school Whitefriars in the ACC school competition. Apart from football, he was talented at most sports he played, including cricket, soccer and tennis, but especially basketball. His leadership was recognised at a young age when he was named co-captain of the Victorian Primary Schools (VPS) basketball side. He featured in the under-16 Victorian basketball side and was selected in the Australian under-17 squad alongside 2014 NBA number-five draft pick and Dallas Mavericks player, Dante Exum. Basketball was his best sport as a junior; however, he decided to pursue a football career instead at sixteen years of age to stay in Australia and be closer to friends and family.

Petracca attended Whitefriars College, completing year 12 in 2013 and was named as the captain of their football side in the same year. He was a bottom-aged player with the Eastern Ranges in the TAC Cup during 2013 playing as a forward and he finished with 41 goals from 17 matches, including six against the Geelong Falcons in round nine and five in the preliminary final, also against the Geelong Falcons. He was named as one of the best players in the 92-point grand final victory against the Dandenong Stingrays, finishing with two goals and twenty-one disposals and ended the season as the Eastern Ranges leading goalkicker whilst also tying for second place in the best and fairest count. He received mid-year honours through selection as a bottom-aged player for Vic Metro in the 2013 AFL Under 18 Championships, and played in one match, the opening round match against Queensland where he was named as one of the best players. He also played for and captained the Victoria GAA minor (under 18) gaelic football side at the 2013 Australasian Gaelic Games in which he garnered player of the tournament honours.

After graduating high school in 2013, Petracca attended Swinburne University during 2014, studying commerce and marketing. He was awarded a scholarship within the AIS-AFL Academy, which saw him begin his draft year participating in the AIS-AFL Academy match against Collingwood's Victorian Football League (VFL) side at the Melbourne Cricket Ground in April, followed by a two-week tour to Europe. After declaring he wanted to be captain of the Eastern Ranges for 2014, he was instead named vice-captain due to his commitments with the AIS-AFL Academy. He played nine matches for the season finishing with 20 goals and ended the season with a tied third-place finish in the Morrish Medal and was named on the half-forward flank in the TAC Cup team of the year. He was again selected for Vic Metro in the Under 18 Championships playing a midfield, on-ball role. He played five out of six matches and was named in the best players in every match, where he averaged twenty-five disposals, five marks and five clearances per match. His performances in the championships saw him rewarded with the Larke Medal as the championships best player, the best and fairest player for Vic Metro where he finished fourteen votes ahead of Ed Vickers-Willis and was named in the All-Australian team as the centre midfield position.

After Petracca's strong performances in the championships, it was predicted he would be drafted inside the top-five in the 2014 national draft; however, by the end of the TAC Cup season, his draft chances were elevated to him becoming the number-one draft pick. His move into the midfield during 2014 proved he had the ability to play in both the forward-line and midfield, along with an increase in his endurance, this saw him described as the "most dominant player in the draft" by AFL Media journalist, Callum Twomey. His dual position capabilities saw him draw comparisons to Richmond player, Dustin Martin, and Port Adelaide midfielder, Ollie Wines, which led an AFL recruiter to rate him as a "star" and note that he has a "unique skill-set for an 18-year-old. He mixes power, speed, leap and marking. He’s a mid-forward, he’ll be an impact player used in short spells onball, [and] he’s a unique talent."

Prior to being drafted, Petracca supported the Collingwood Football Club.

== AFL career ==
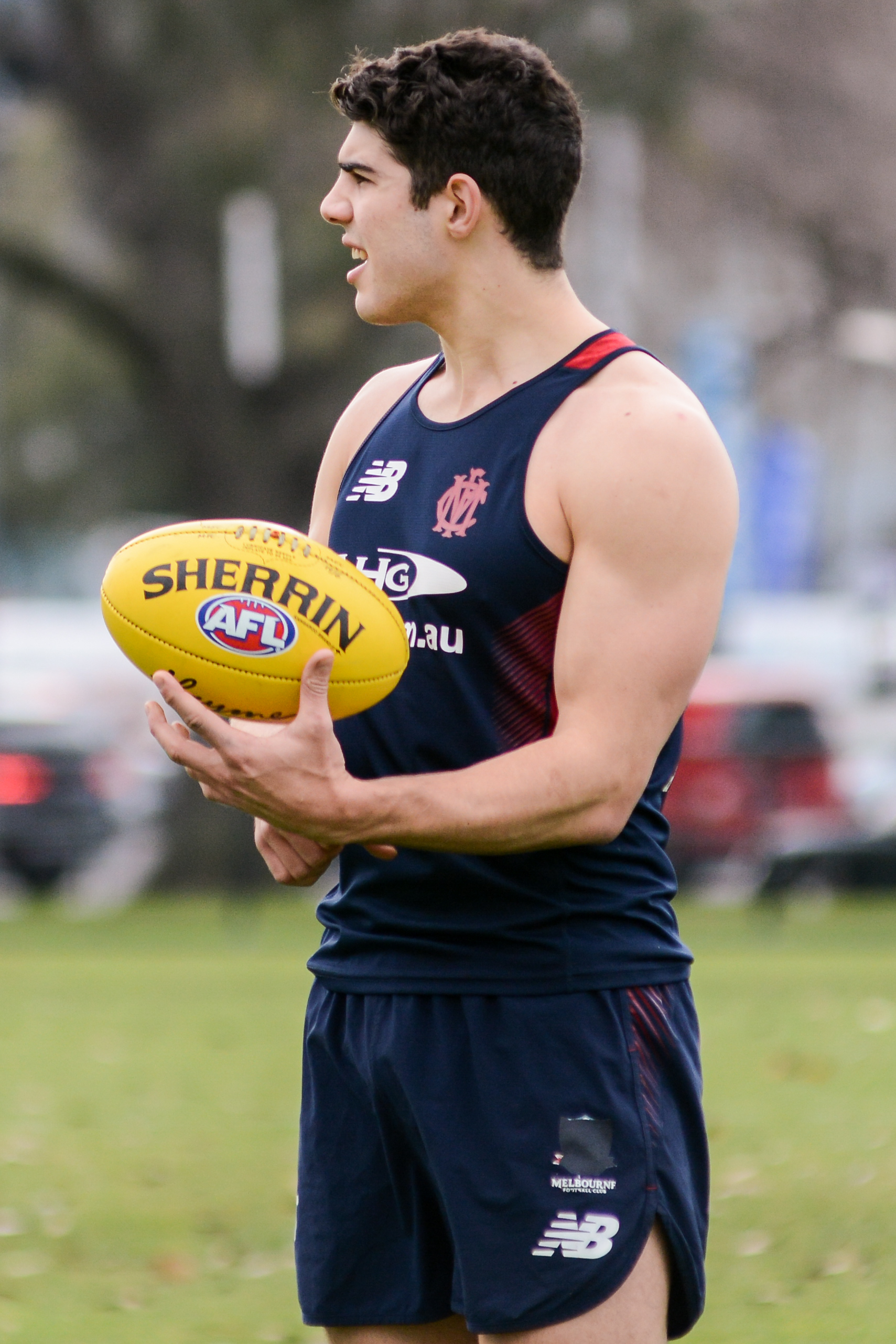
Petracca at training in July 2015

=== Melbourne (2015–2025) ===
Despite speculation Petracca would be the number one draft pick in the months leading to the 2014 national draft, he was ultimately drafted by the Melbourne Football Club with their first selection and second overall; the eventual number one draft pick, Paddy McCartin, was drafted to the St Kilda Football Club as a long-term replacement for Nick Riewoldt. He was predicted to play in the opening round of 2015 due to having an "AFL ready body"; however, his season ended abruptly after rupturing his ACL in his left knee at training in February. In May, he signed a two-year contract extension to the end of 2018.

He's genuinely going to be a star of the competition going forward.

— Jonathan Brown, former Brisbane Lions captain

After missing the entire 2015 season, speculation by the media surrounded Petracca and when he would play his debut match; however, a basketball mishap saw him break his toe during the Christmas break. Early reports stated he could still make his debut in round one, but, then-Melbourne coach, Paul Roos, quashed the reports by stating the mishap had cost Petracca a round one debut. Following the recovery from his broken toe, he played in the Victorian Football League (VFL) for Melbourne's affiliate team, the Casey Scorpions. As he spent more time in the VFL, speculation grew as to when he would make his AFL debut, along with AFL Media journalist Callum Twomey, noting the footy world was "fascinated" with Petracca and his potential debut.

Petracca ultimately made his debut in round six against St Kilda at Etihad Stadium in a 39-point loss, and there was strong hype surrounding his debut; however, his performance in his debut was labelled as a glimpse of his potential by News Corp Australia journalists Adam Baldwin and Jay Clark. In his second match, Petracca kicked his first AFL goal, finishing with two for the match; his second goal, in which he broke away from his opponent and tapped the ball to himself from the ground, saw former Brisbane Lions forward Jonathan Brown praise his skill by stating: "Jeez...it's a simple game when you make it look that easy." In his fourth match, he recorded 21 disposals, 11 score involvements and seven tackles in the 63-point win against the Brisbane Lions at the Melbourne Cricket Ground, which saw him rewarded with the round nine nomination for the Rising Star. The match drew high praise from the head of football writer at the Herald Sun, Mark Robinson, while teammate, Jack Watts, labelled him an "absolute beast".

After a handful of matches, Petracca became the favourite to win the Rising Star and received praise from Australian Football Hall of Fame members, Matthew Lloyd and Wayne Carey, with the former claiming his ability would bring fans through the gates, and the latter compared him to Norm Smith Medallist and three-time premiership player, Steve Johnson. Fox Sports Australia journalist, Ben Waterworth, made further comparisons to Steve Johnson, while also declaring Petracca edged Johnson with his overhead marking ability, with former St Kilda captain, Danny Frawley reiterating during the Queen's Birthday clash, "every time he goes near the ball, you sense he's going to mark the ball because he's got a beautiful pair of hands." He played every match following his debut, and finished the season with seventeen in total. After tailing off towards the end of the season, which he later attributed to his body tiring from the demands of AFL football, he finished sixth in the Rising Star and finished twelfth in Melbourne's best and fairest count. Despite finishing sixth in the Rising Star, he ranked first for inside-50s, second for goal assists and third for contested possessions per game out of all the Rising Star nominees. Furthermore, he was recognised as one of the best young players in the league when he was named in the 22under22 team on the half-forward flank.

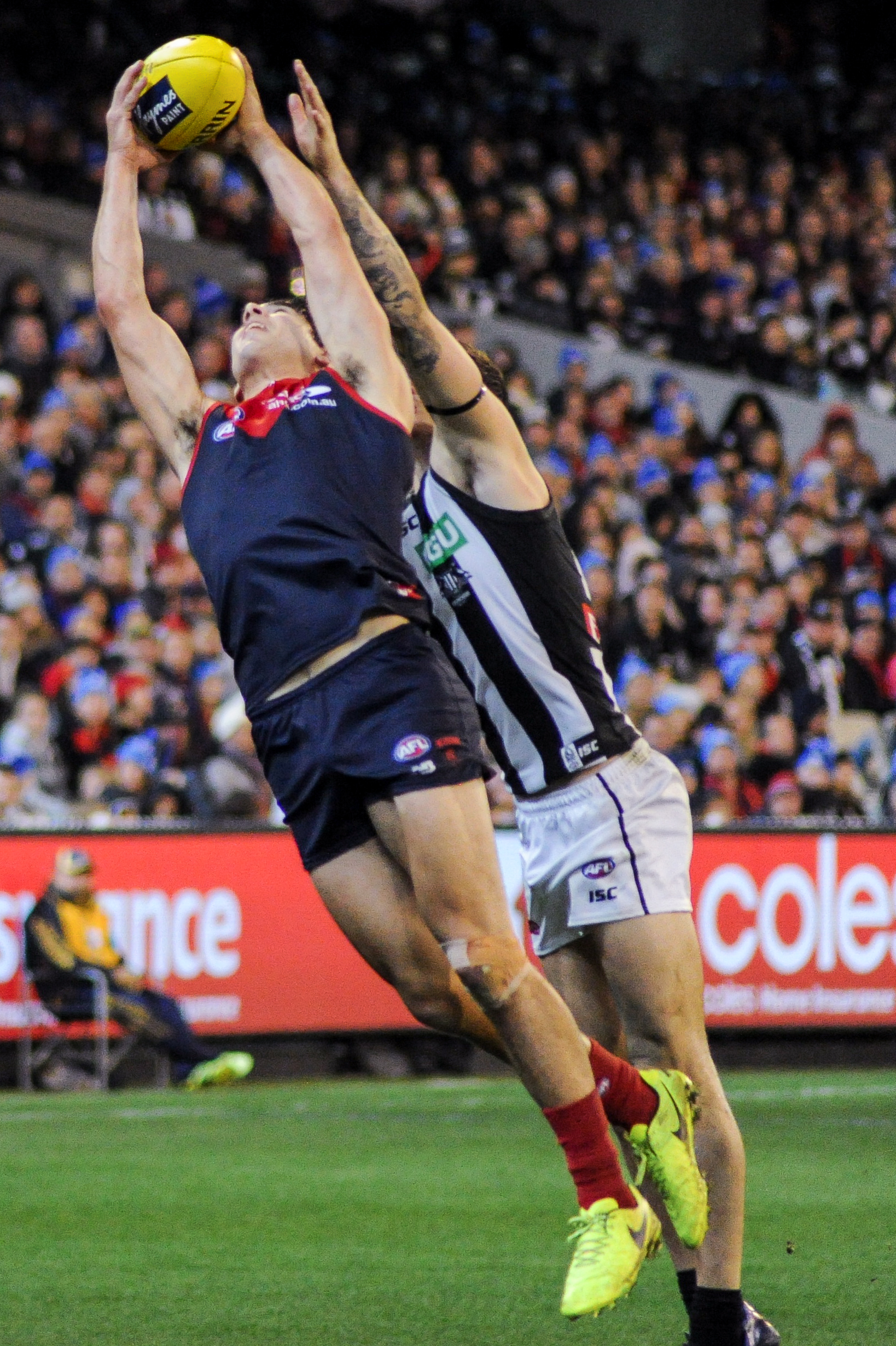
Petracca marking in front of Jack Crisp during the 2017 Queen's Birthday clash.

Entering the 2017 season, Petracca lost six kilograms in an attempt to play more game-time in the midfield and to increase his endurance base. This focused change led many to believe that he would take his "game to the next level" for the 2017 season, including teammates, Dom Tyson and Neville Jetta, Fox Sports Australia journalists, Riley Beveridge and Anna Harrington, 300-gamer for Port Adelaide, Kane Cornes, who drew comparisons between Petracca and the reigning Brownlow Medallist, Patrick Dangerfield, and former Melbourne player David Schwarz, who compared Petracca to the 2003 Brownlow Medallist, Mark Ricciuto. After Melbourne's second match in the JLT Community Series, a fifty-four point win against Carlton, in which Petracca recorded nineteen disposals, six marks and four goals to be named the best player on the ground by AFL Media, Herald Sun journalist, Glenn McFarlane, declared 2017 would be a breakout season for Petracca. Furthermore, in the week leading to the start of the AFL season, he was named in the top fifty AFL players by Mike Sheahan.

Petracca went on to play every match for the season, and throughout the season, the media continued to ponder on the type of player Petracca could become. Senior football writer with the Herald Sun, Jon Anderson, wrote in May that Petracca was an "extremely valuable commodity" and compared him to former players Tim Watson, Sam Kekovich and Ron Barassi, and claimed he could outweigh the two previous Brownlow Medallists, Nat Fyfe and Patrick Dangerfield, in his "natural affinity with scoring." Another Herald Sun journalist, Sam Edmund, compared him to Dustin Martin and Robbie Gray and highlighted Petracca's self-confessed dreams of wanting to be remembered as one of the best players and a potential hall of fame member. His teammate Clayton Oliver added further praise when he declared: "He's going to be one of the best players in the [competition], if not now, then soon" and Fox Sports Australia reporter, Sarah Olle, wrote he had a "match-winning flair" whereby he is "strong through the hips, dangerous in front of goal and has the perfect balance between swagger and determination that lifts his teammates." Riley Beveridge further commended him when he compared Petracca to Hawthorn's 2015 Norm Smith Medallist, Cyril Rioli, due to his influence as a forward-midfielder.

Although the external praise on Petracca throughout the season was high, Sam Edmund noted his performances throughout the season justified the praise as he was "walking the walk". During the thirty-eight point win against Essendon at Etihad Stadium in round six, Petracca recorded a career-high four goals and was named in Melbourne's best players by AFL Media. He was named the best player on the ground for the annual Queen's Birthday clash in the four point win over Collingwood, in which he recorded eighteen disposals, seven marks and three goals and won the Neale Daniher Trophy after receiving eight out of a possible nine votes. He was praised for his performance in the match by Chris Judd who stated Petracca's acceleration was "elite". Furthermore, he was named in AFL Media's team of the week on three occasions. Despite the amount of praise he received during the season, he failed to make the final 22under22 team, a team decided by fan votes.

In 2021, Petracca starred in Melbourne's 2021 Grand Final victory with a 39-disposal game, Melbourne's first premiership in 57 years. Petracca equalled Simon Black's record for most disposals in a grand final and won the prestigious Norm Smith medal for his best-on-ground performance.

=== Gold Coast (2026–present) ===
==== 2026 ====
Petracca requested a move to the Gold Coast Suns in September of 2025, which was finalised on the 15th of October on the last day of the 2025 Continental Tyres AFL Trade Period.

Petracca debuted for Gold Coast in the Opening Round of the 2026 AFL Season performing impressively in the 54-point win over Geelong, recording 34 disposals and 3 goals. Petracca once again performed very well the following week in the 59-point win over West Coast, recording 23 disposals and 4 goals. Both of these performances were awarded with 3 Brownlow votes each.

In the round 2 match against Richmond, Petracca sustained a hamstring injury, resulting in him missing the round 4 and 5 matches against Melbourne and Sydney respectively. Upon his return in round 6 against Essendon, he once again performed very well with 25 disposals and 3 goals - another performance that polled 3 Brownlow votes.

2 weeks later in round 8, for the fourth time in six matches, Petracca again polled 3 Brownlow votes in the Sun's 20-point win over GWS, tallying 29 disposals and 2 goals.

Over Petracca's next 14 matches, which saw out the remainder of the 2026 AFL Season, much like the rest of his team, he saw a form slump mid-season, reflected by much malignment from the media, as well only polling another 3 Brownlow votes for the remainder of the entire season.

An uproar from the media was sparked by an altercation between Petracca and his teammate Leo Lombard during the Sun's Round 20 match again Carlton. Petracca was seen berating his younger teammate following him being caught holding the ball late in the match, to which Lombard was seen responding to with "F**k off". This incident was slammed in the media and brought into question many aspects of the Sun's team culture and structural integrity, particularly due to this match being the Sun's 9th consecutive loss for the season, which would eventually become 10 straight losses.

== Statistics ==
Updated to the end of the 2026 season.

Legend
G	Goals	K	Kicks	D	Disposals	T	Tackles
B	Behinds	H	Handballs	M	Marks
#	Played in that season's premiership team

Season	Team	No.	Games	Totals							Averages (per game)							Votes
Season	Team	No.	Games	G	B	K	H	D	M	T	G	B	K	H	D	M	T	Votes
2015	Melbourne	26	0	—	—	—	—	—	—	—	—	—	—	—	—	—	—	0
2016	Melbourne	5	17	12	11	144	152	296	42	56	0.7	0.6	8.5	8.9	17.4	2.5	3.3	0
2017	Melbourne	5	22	26	6	181	233	414	72	54	1.2	0.3	8.2	10.6	18.8	3.3	2.5	2
2018	Melbourne	5	24	19	23	268	218	486	95	73	0.8	1.0	11.2	9.1	20.3	4.0	3.0	3
2019	Melbourne	5	22	22	14	212	199	411	89	65	1.0	0.6	9.6	9.0	18.7	4.0	3.0	0
2020 (Note: The 2020 season was played with 17 home-and-away matches per team (down from 22) and 16-minute quarters with time on (down from 20-minute quarters with time on) due to the impact of the COVID-19 pandemic.)	Melbourne	5	17	15	14	202	198	400	58	54	0.9	0.8	11.9	11.6	23.5	3.4	3.2	20
2021^{#}	Melbourne	5	25	29	19	409	321	730	126	103	1.2	0.8	16.4	12.8	29.2	5.0	4.1	23
2022	Melbourne	5	24	19	31	357	316	673	100	75	0.8	1.3	14.9	13.2	28.0	4.2	3.1	24
2023	Melbourne	5	25	28	34	351	344	695	107	99	1.1	1.4	14.0	13.8	27.8	4.3	4.0	26
2024	Melbourne	5	13	14	12	148	156	304	57	39	1.1	0.9	11.4	12.0	23.4	4.4	3.0	16
2025	Melbourne	5	23	18	24	265	321	586	82	78	0.8	1.0	11.5	14.0	25.5	3.6	3.4	16
2026	Gold Coast	3	20	22	16	211	253	464	63	46	1.1	0.8	10.6	12.7	23.2	3.1	2.3	15
Career			232	224	204	2747	2712	5459	892	743	1.0	0.9	11.8	11.7	23.5	3.8	3.2	145

== Honours and achievements ==
Team

- AFL premiership player (Melbourne): 2021
- AFL minor premiership/McClelland Trophy (Melbourne): 2021
- McClelland Trophy (Melbourne): 2023

Individual

- Norm Smith Medal: 2021
- 3× All-Australian team: 2020, 2021, 2022
- 2× Keith 'Bluey' Truscott Trophy: 2020, 2023
- Melbourne leading goalkicker: 2019
- Frank 'Checker' Hughes Medal: 2021
- Neale Daniher Trophy: 2017
- AFL Rising Star nominee: 2016
