= Tom Flower =

Australian rules footballer

Personal information
- Full name: Thomas Harold Flower
- Born: 3 December 1957 (age 68)
- Original team: Murrumbeena
- Height: 184 cm (6 ft 0 in)
- Weight: 71.5 kg (158 lb)
- Position: Wing / Half Forward

Playing career^{1}
Years	Club	Games (Goals)
1977–79	Melbourne	26 (28)
- ^{1} Playing statistics correct to the end of 1979.

Thomas Harold Flower (born 3 December 1957) is a former Australian rules footballer who played with Melbourne in the Victorian Football League (VFL).

He is the younger brother of former Melbourne captain and Australian Football Hall of Fame inductee Robert Flower.
