= Nathan Jones (Australian footballer) =

Australian rules footballer (born 1988)

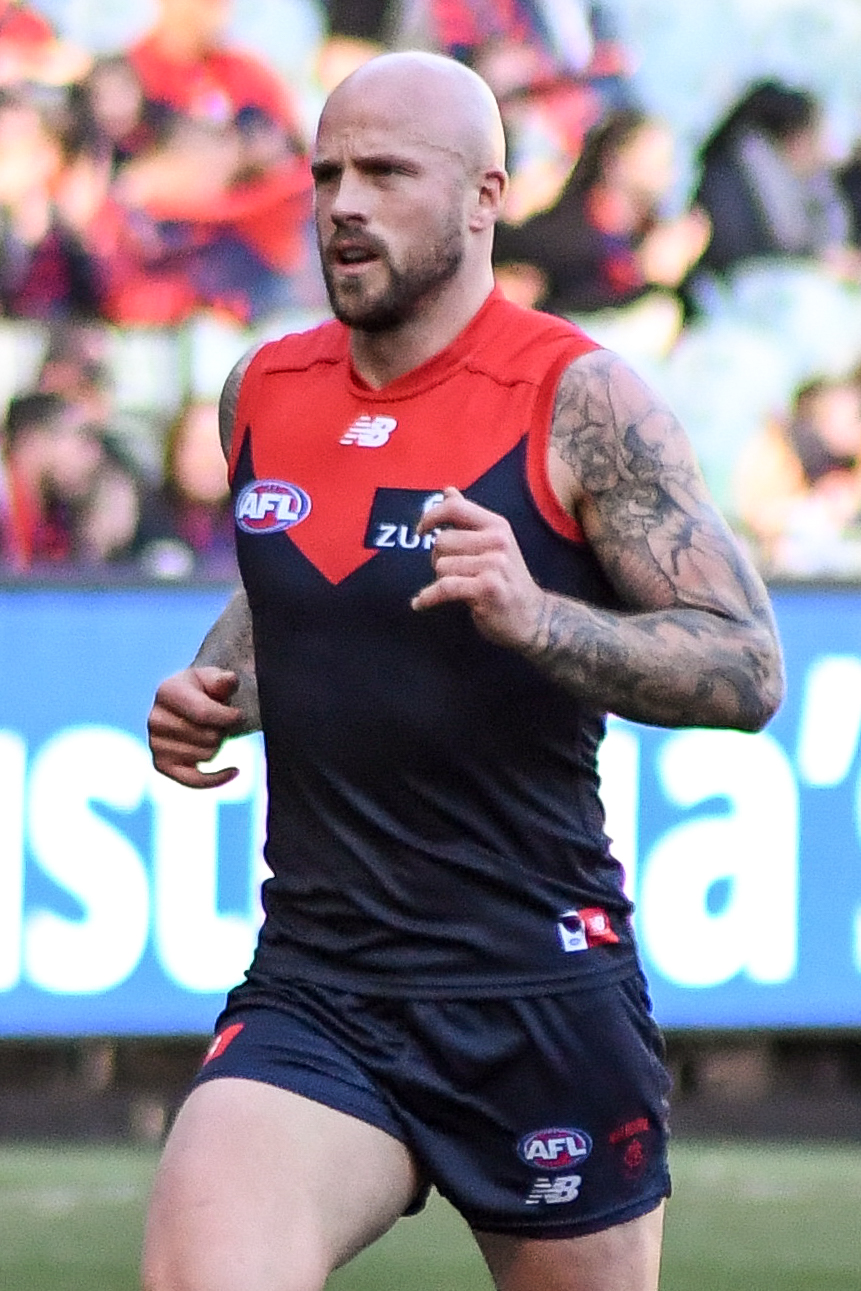
- Jones playing in August 2018

Personal information
- Full name: Nathan Jones
- Nicknames: Jonesy, Chunk
- Born: 20 January 1988 (age 38)
- Original team: Dandenong Stingrays (TAC Cup)
- Draft: No. 12, 2005 national draft
- Debut: Round 17, 2006, Melbourne vs. Western Bulldogs, at MCG
- Height: 180 cm (5 ft 11 in)
- Weight: 87 kg (192 lb)
- Position: Midfielder

Playing career^{1}
Years	Club	Games (Goals)
2006–2021	Melbourne	302 (141)
- ^{1} Playing statistics correct to the end of 2021.

Career highlights
- Melbourne captain: 2014–2019; 3× Keith 'Bluey' Truscott Medallist: 2012, 2013, 2014; 2× AFL Rising Star nominee: 2006, 2007

Nathan Jones (born 20 January 1988) is a former Australian rules footballer and current coach known for playing for and coaching the Melbourne Football Club in the Australian Football League. He is the older brother of former Sydney and St Kilda player Zak Jones. He served as the captain of Melbourne from 2014 until he stepped down at the end of the 2019 season.

== Early life ==
Jones played for the Dandenong Stingrays in the TAC Cup during his junior career and was selected to play for Vic Metro in the 2005 AFL Under-18 Championships. He was named in the 2005 Under-18 All-Australian team as a follower. He played in the TAC Cup Grand Final (now known as NAB League Boys) for Dandenong in 2005 and collected 36 disposals; however, they were defeated by 15 points by Gippsland Power.

Growing up, he was a St Kilda supporter.

== AFL career ==
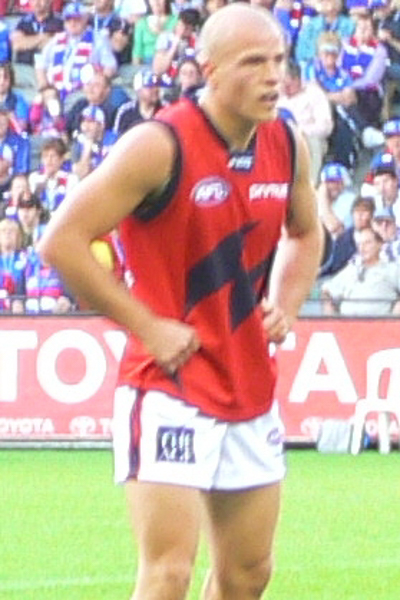
Jones in May 2007

Jones was drafted to Melbourne with their first selection and the 12th overall in the 2005 national draft. He made his debut against the Western Bulldogs in Round 17, 2006, at the Melbourne Cricket Ground and played the remaining eight games for the season, including the elimination final win against St Kilda and the semi-final loss to Fremantle. After his fourth match, he earned the Round 20 Rising Star nomination for his game against the Kangaroos, where he collected 25 disposals. After Melbourne were eliminated from the finals, he played for Melbourne's VFL-affiliate team, Sandringham, and played in their premiership side.

Jones played 21 games during 2007 and earned a second Rising Star nomination after the round 17 loss to Port Adelaide. He finished third in the award behind Joel Selwood and Scott Pendlebury and received 17 votes out of a possible 45. He was the runner-up in Melbourne's best and fairest with 190 votes, finishing behind James McDonald who received 260 votes.

Jones cemented himself in Melbourne's side by playing 21 games in 2008 in what was a disappointing year for the club, finishing on the bottom of the ladder. He played 21 matches in 2009 in a year where the club received the wooden spoon for the second consecutive season. After the Round 2 match against Collingwood in 2009, Jones's father was attacked by Collingwood fans in an altercation outside the ground. Jones remained a consistent figure in the side, playing every match in 2010 and 2011, including his 100th AFL game in the latter season.

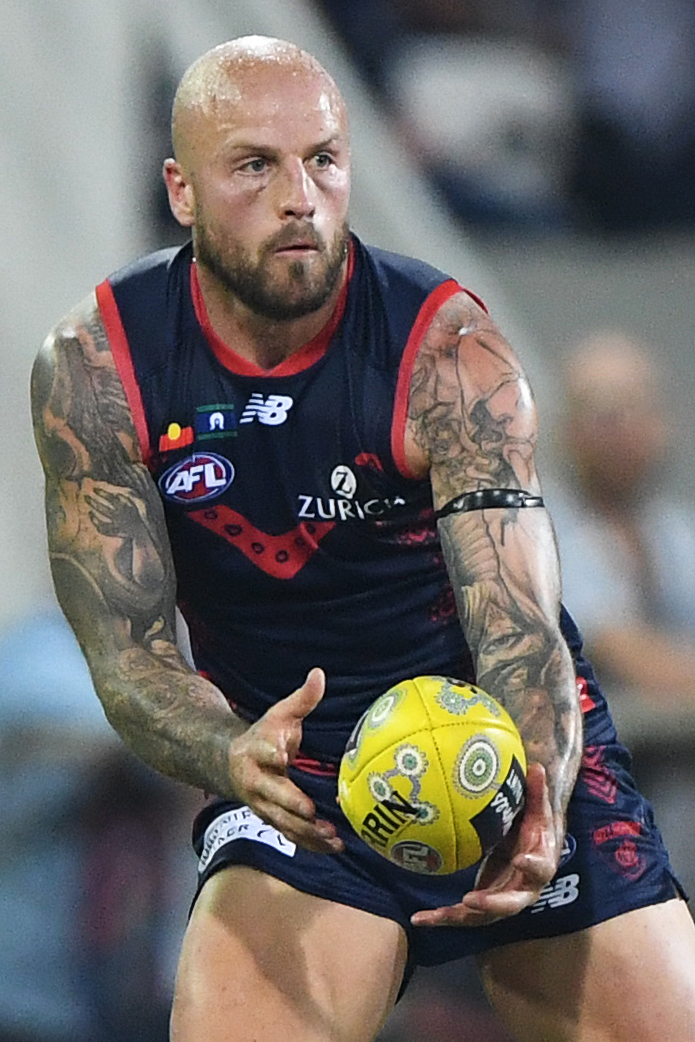
Jones playing for Melbourne in 2019

Jones established himself as Melbourne's leading midfielder in 2012 by winning his first Keith 'Bluey' Truscott Medal as the club's best and fairest; in addition, he polled 14 votes in the Brownlow Medal count to finish inside the top 20. He was named as vice captain prior to the 2013 season.

In May 2013, Jones was appointed as interim co-captain alongside Jack Trengove, replacing the injured Jack Grimes. He played every match during the season and won the best and fairest for the second consecutive season, finishing ahead of Colin Garland.

After the appointment of new coach Paul Roos, Jones was elected as co-captain alongside Jack Grimes for the 2014 season. He played every match for the season, amassing a career-high 610 disposals, the second-highest tally in the league during the home-and-away season, as well as having the fourth-highest number of clearances. He won his third consecutive Keith 'Bluey' Truscott Medal, a feat only previously achieved by club champion Jim Stynes.

At the end of 2014, Jones signed a four-year contract extension with the Demons, practically ensuring he would remain a one-club player. In February 2015, after Jack Grimes relinquished the co-captaincy, Jones was announced as sole captain, with Lynden Dunn named as vice-captain. He played his 200th AFL game in the Round 22 match against Fremantle; however, he suffered an ankle injury in the second quarter that forced him to be substituted out of the game. He finished fifth in the best-and-fairest count; and, despite playing every match for the season, it was announced that he had played most of the season with a neck injury.

In 2021, the 33-year-old Jones sustained multiple injuries (including a hamstring and later calf injury) that saw him missing the majority of his season (as in 2020, where he'd injured his quadriceps). Nonetheless, Jones became just the second Melbourne player, after David Neitz, to reach the 300-game milestone for the club, doing so against Richmond in round six. After Melbourne qualified for the 2021 AFL Grand Final, the injured Jones made the decision to return home to Victoria to be with his wife for the birth of their twins. He subsequently announced his retirement from the AFL, finishing on 302 games, four short of the club's all-time games record held by Neitz.

== Coaching career ==
Jones began his coaching career in the VAFA, leading Peninsula Grammar to a narrow finals miss in the 2024 VAFA season. Jones then joined his former club Melbourne, as their senior midfield and stoppages coach, replacing Greg Stafford (footballer), as the Demons reworked their coaching staff following the departure of assistant Andrew McQualter to the West Coast Eagles senior coach position.

== Statistics ==
Legend
G	Goals	K	Kicks	D	Disposals	T	Tackles
B	Behinds	H	Handballs	M	Marks

Season	Team	No.	Games	Totals							Averages (per game)							Votes
Season	Team	No.	Games	G	B	K	H	D	M	T	G	B	K	H	D	M	T	Votes
2006	Melbourne	2	8	2	0	64	47	111	20	25	0.3	0.0	8.0	5.9	13.9	2.5	3.1	2
2007	Melbourne	2	21	10	6	219	146	365	61	86	0.5	0.6	10.4	6.9	16.9	2.9	3.9	5
2008	Melbourne	2	21	9	6	212	220	432	65	53	0.4	0.3	10.1	10.5	20.6	3.1	2.5	0
2009	Melbourne	2	20	8	11	209	234	443	77	41	0.4	0.6	10.5	11.7	22.2	3.9	2.1	4
2010	Melbourne	2	22	9	12	198	227	425	54	62	0.4	0.5	9.0	10.3	19.3	2.5	2.8	1
2011	Melbourne	2	22	14	9	266	241	507	100	68	0.6	0.4	12.1	11.0	23.1	4.5	3.1	1
2012	Melbourne	2	21	16	10	265	251	516	45	95	0.8	0.5	12.6	12.0	24.6	2.1	4.5	14
2013	Melbourne	2	22	8	7	233	276	509	46	76	0.4	0.3	10.6	12.5	23.1	2.0	3.4	6
2014	Melbourne	2	22	7	6	311	299	610	64	115	0.3	0.3	14.1	13.6	27.7	2.9	5.2	13
2015	Melbourne	2	22	12	7	268	255	523	53	95	0.5	0.3	12.2	11.6	23.8	2.4	4.3	10
2016	Melbourne	2	22	10	11	288	329	617	56	118	0.5	0.5	13.1	15.0	28.0	2.5	5.4	11
2017	Melbourne	2	16	10	6	207	232	439	63	86	0.6	0.4	12.9	14.5	27.4	3.9	5.4	7
2018	Melbourne	2	25	15	10	285	329	614	66	93	0.6	0.4	11.4	13.2	24.6	2.6	3.7	7
2019	Melbourne	2	22	8	5	241	210	451	83	53	0.4	0.2	11.0	9.5	20.5	3.8	2.4	0
2020 (Note: The 2020 season was played with 17 home-and-away matches per team (down from 22) and 16-minute quarters with time on (down from 20-minute quarters with time on) due to the impact of the COVID-19 pandemic.)	Melbourne	2	8	1	3	50	54	104	23	13	0.1	0.4	6.3	6.8	13.0	2.9	1.6	0
2021 (Note: Statistics include one game in which Jones was a used medical substitute (round 7) and one game in which he was an unused medical substitute (round 15).)	Melbourne	2	8	2	3	50	45	95	23	12	0.3	0.4	6.3	5.6	11.9	2.9	1.5	0
Career			302	141	112	3366	3395	6761	899	1091	0.5	0.4	11.1	11.2	22.4	3.0	3.6	81

== Honours and achievements ==
Team

- McClelland Trophy (Melbourne): 2021

Individual

- Melbourne captain: 2014–2019
- Keith 'Bluey' Truscott Trophy: 2012, 2013, 2014
- AFL Rising Star nominee: 2006 (Round 20), 2007 (Round 17)
- David Neitz Medallist 2021
