= Fred Fanning =

Australian rules footballer

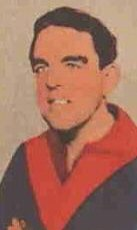

Personal information
- Born: 5 November 1921
- Died: 23 May 1993 (aged 71); Geelong, Victoria, Australia
- Original team: Coburg juniors
- Height: 193 cm (6 ft 4 in)
- Weight: 102 kg (225 lb)
- Position: Full-forward

Playing career^{1}
Years	Club	Games (Goals)
1940–1947	Melbourne	104 (411)
- ^{1} Playing statistics correct to the end of 1947.

Career highlights
- VFL premiership: 1940; 4× VFL leading goalkicker: 1943, 1944, 1945, 1947; Keith 'Bluey' Truscott Medal: 1945; 5× Melbourne leading goalkicker: 1942, 1943, 1944, 1945, 1947

Fred Fanning (5 November 1921 – 23 May 1993) was an Australian rules footballer who played for Melbourne in the Victorian Football League (VFL). A dominant full-forward in the 1940s, he is best known for holding the record of the most goals kicked in a single VFL/AFL match, with 18.

Fanning played his entire VFL career with Melbourne between 1940 and 1947, finishing as the VFL's leading goalkicker four times and winning the club's best and fairest, the Keith 'Bluey' Truscott Medal in 1945. Despite a relatively short career, he established himself as one of the most prolific forwards of his era, kicking 411 goals.

His record of 18 goals in a match, set against St Kilda in the final round of the 1947 season remains unsurpassed in VFL/AFL history. Fanning retired immediately after the match, making his final appearance one of the most remarkable individual performances in the history of the competition.

== VFL career ==
Hailing from the Victorian Football Association (VFA) club Coburg, Fanning was a strongly built forward standing at 193 cm and weighing 102 kg. In September 1939, playing for Melbourne Seconds against Richmond in the Seconds' Grand Final, Fanning kicked 12 goals in a 29-point victory.

Fanning made his senior debut in 1940 and played in that year's Grand Final victory over Richmond. He topped the VFL's goalkicking charts in 1943 (62 goals), 1944 (87) and 1945 (67), a year in which he also won Melbourne's best and fairest award.

In Round 19, 1947, he kicked 18 goals, 1 behind, in a game against St Kilda, which remains the record for most goals in a VFL/AFL match to this day; this was coincidentally Fanning's final appearance in a VFL match. He kicked 97 goals for the 1947 VFL season, the highest in his VFL career.

== Post-VFL ==
Fanning joined the Hamilton Football Club in the Western District Football League as captain-coach in 1948, after being offered 3 to 6 times the salary he was receiving at Melbourne (accounts vary). This appointment caused a split in the club, and the Hamilton Imperials were founded.

Fanning held the Western District record for most goals in a game by kicking 22 against Heywood in 1949. The following year he kicked 20 goals against Penshurst. He kicked a Western District record of 151 goals in a season in 1952. He finished his football career at Coleraine in 1953.
