= John Townsend (footballer) =

Australian rules footballer (born 1943)

Personal information
- Full name: John Townsend
- Born: 16 June 1943 (age 83)
- Original team: St Pat's College
- Height: 171 cm (5 ft 7 in)
- Weight: 66 kg (146 lb)

Playing career^{1}
Years	Club	Games (Goals)
1962–1972	Melbourne	153 (182)
- ^{1} Playing statistics correct to the end of 1972.

Career highlights
- VFL premiership player: 1964; Keith 'Bluey' Truscott Medal: 1965; 2× Melbourne leading goalkicker: 1964, 1965

John Townsend (born 16 June 1943) is a former Australian rules footballer who played for Melbourne in the Victorian Football League (VFL).

Originally from Sale, Townsend came to Melbourne and made his league debut in 1962.

He played as a rover and was handy near goals, topping the club's goalkicking in their premiership season of 1964 with 35 of them.

Townsend won Melbourne's Best and Fairest award in both 1965 and 1969.

He finished his career in the Victorian Football Association with Prahran.

In 2003 he was selected in Prahran's Team of the Century.

He is the uncle of Marcus Ashcroft and great uncle of Will Ashcroft and Levi Ashcroft.

== Playing statistics ==
Legend
G	Goals	K	Kicks	D	Disposals	T	Tackles
B	Behinds	H	Handballs	M	Marks

Season	Team	No.	Games	Totals							Averages (per game)						
Season	Team	No.	Games	G	B	K	H	D	M	T	G	B	K	H	D	M	T
1962	Melbourne	16	6	7	—N/a	—N/a	—N/a	—N/a	—N/a	—N/a	1.2	—N/a	—N/a	—N/a	—N/a	—N/a	—N/a
1963	Melbourne	16	19	22	—N/a	—N/a	—N/a	—N/a	—N/a	—N/a	1.2	—N/a	—N/a	—N/a	—N/a	—N/a	—N/a
1964	Melbourne	16	20	35	—N/a	—N/a	—N/a	—N/a	—N/a	—N/a	1.8	—N/a	—N/a	—N/a	—N/a	—N/a	—N/a
1965	Melbourne	16	18	34	26	295	42	337	63	—N/a	1.9	1.4	16.4	2.3	18.7	3.5	—N/a
1966	Melbourne	16	1	0	1	11	2	13	1	—N/a	0.0	1.0	11.0	2.0	13.0	1.0	—N/a
1967	Melbourne	16	6	5	7	75	31	106	16	—N/a	0.8	1.2	12.5	5.2	17.7	2.7	—N/a
1968	Melbourne	16	16	15	11	254	62	316	53	—N/a	0.9	0.7	15.9	3.9	19.8	3.3	—N/a
1969	Melbourne	16	20	16	29	416	68	484	97	—N/a	0.8	1.5	20.8	3.4	24.2	4.9	—N/a
1970	Melbourne	16	17	14	20	265	48	313	63	—N/a	0.8	1.2	15.6	2.8	18.4	3.7	—N/a
1971	Melbourne	16	18	25	28	301	87	388	80	—N/a	1.4	1.6	16.7	4.8	21.6	4.4	—N/a
1972	Melbourne	16	12	9	12	152	44	196	48	—N/a	0.8	1.0	12.7	3.7	16.3	4.0	—N/a
Career			153	182	134	1769	384	2153	421	—N/a	1.2	1.2	16.4	3.6	19.9	3.9	—N/a
