= Shane Woewodin =

Australian rules footballer (born 1976)

Personal information
- Full name: Shane Woewodin
- Nickname: Woey
- Born: 12 July 1976 (age 50)
- Original team: East Fremantle (WAFL)
- Draft: No. 18, 1997 pre-season draft
- Height: 185 cm (6 ft 1 in)
- Weight: 83 kg (183 lb)
- Position: Midfielder

Playing career^{1}
Years	Club	Games (Goals)
1997–2002	Melbourne	138 (63)
2003–2005	Collingwood	62 (31)
Total		200 (94)

International team honours
Years	Team	Games (Goals)
2000	Australia	2

Coaching career^{3}
Years	Club	Games (W–L–D)
2015–2016	Brisbane Lions (NEAFL)	36 (5–31–0)
- ^{1} Playing statistics correct to the end of 2005.^{3} Coaching statistics correct as of 2016.

Career highlights
- Brownlow Medal: 2000; Keith 'Bluey' Truscott Medal: 2000; East Fremantle best and fairest 2006; AFL Rising Star nominee: 1997

Shane Woewodin (born 12 July 1976) is a retired Australian rules football player who played 200 games with the Melbourne and Collingwood Football Clubs. He was the recipient of the Brownlow Medal in 2000.

== Early career ==
Born to Ukrainian parents, Woewodin played the majority of his junior career at the Lynwood Ferndale Junior Football Club predominantly as a centre half-forward. LFJFC was a part of the East Fremantle recruiting zone. Shane attended Kent Street Senior High School as a teenager and made his debut for the seniors of East Fremantle in the West Australian Football League (WAFL) in 1995. In 1997, he was picked up by Melbourne in the pre-season draft.

== AFL career ==
=== Melbourne ===
Woewodin had played more than 100 consecutive games since his debut.

The highlight of Woewodin's career is his 2000 Brownlow Medal victory, in which he finished ahead of favourite Scott West of the Western Bulldogs. Woewodin played in the losing Grand Final team against Essendon that year.

In the 2001 AFL season, Woewodin experienced injury and poor form as the Demons finished outside the final eight.

=== Collingwood ===
In the aftermath of the 2002 season, in which Woewodin improved on his 2001 but was still unable to recapture his 2000 Brownlow-winning form, Melbourne sought to trade Woewodin to Collingwood as they felt he was underperforming given that he became one of the highest-paid AFL footballers at the end of the 2000 season. Woewodin held general discussions with Collingwood initially, but the media speculated that he was keen to remain in Melbourne and ultimately would accept a reduced salary. However, Woewodin was traded to Collingwood for a first-round draft pick (which Melbourne used on South Australian half-back/midfielder Daniel Bell).

In the days and weeks following his trade, it was revealed that Melbourne approached Woewodin at the end of the season with the view of negotiating a salary reduction. It was rumoured that Woewodin offered to reduce his $500,000 per year contract by approximately $50,000 per year. However, Melbourne officials publicly stated that, specific figures aside, it was clear that Woewodin would never agree to the (substantial) reduction they had in mind. Accordingly, they entered into confidential negotiations with Collingwood. As part of the trade, it was believed that Melbourne would pay approximately $320,000 of Woewodin's salary in his first year at Collingwood and Collingwood would pay the balance of $180,000. In the second year, Melbourne and Collingwood were to pay his salary in equal shares and his third year, Collingwood would shoulder most of his salary, thereby creating room in Melbourne's salary cap.

Woewodin was informed of his trade to Collingwood while holidaying in Mauritius. Woewodin was understandably shattered to have been moved on without any significant warning. A verbal war of words between Woewodin and Melbourne coach Neale Daniher, in particular, continued until the Melbourne–Collingwood Queen's Birthday match of 2003. After publicly stating he hoped the Magpies would "smash" his old side, Woewodin got his "revenge", picking up 22 touches in the Pies' 52-point victory. It was the only time Collingwood defeated Melbourne during his three-year stint at the club.

When playing for Collingwood, the Round 7 victory over Adelaide at AAMI Stadium, saw Woewodin ensure 25 possessions and two goals, earning him three of his 12 Brownlow votes for the season.

As Collingwood slid from contention in 2004, Woewodin enjoyed his best season in black and white, finishing second in the Copeland Trophy; however, the following season saw Woewodin fall out of favour. With Collingwood winning a mere five games, the club's selection committee opted to pursue a youth policy, which saw the likes of Woewodin, whose lack of leg speed saw him unable to dominate the midfield as he once had, Andrew Williams and, to a lesser extent, Matthew Lokan, ushered out of the side. He was dropped to the club's VFL-affiliate Williamstown on a number of occasions, and at the end of the season, was delisted.

== Post-AFL career ==
Woewodin hoped to be picked up in the pre-season draft to extend his career beyond 2006 (he expressed interest in re-joining Melbourne), but was eventually overlooked by all clubs in the draft. He gave a candid interview on SEN 1116 revealing his disbelief and frustration at not being picked up when, realistically, he could have played for another three or four seasons. Eventually, he could only manage to play for two seasons in the lower-ranked WAFL.

On the Queen's Birthday match between Melbourne and Collingwood on 12 June 2006, Shane Woewodin did a pre-match lap of honour in an open-top car with his children to celebrate his distinguished career with both sides. He accurately tipped Melbourne to win the match. In an interview he gave prior to the game, he continued to signal his intent to return to the AFL in 2007 and was doing "all the right things" with East Fremantle in an attempt to catch the eye of recruiting staff. Woewodin added that he did not have a manager at this point in time, but was hopeful of selection if he simply nominated himself for the draft. However, he was again overlooked by the draft, due to his age (31).

=== East Fremantle ===
Woewodin finished his career playing for East Fremantle in the WAFL, his original club. In May 2006, after a 37-possession performance for Western Australia against South Australia, Woewodin again reiterated his desire to return to the AFL level. Again he was not selected. He retired at the end of the 2007 WAFL season.

He was named coach of East Fremantle in 2008.

=== Brisbane Lions ===
In October 2010, Woewodin announced that he had signed a two-year deal as the midfield coach for AFL club Brisbane Lions. He also served as the head coach of the Lions' NEAFL reserves team during the 2010s.

=== Return to East Fremantle ===
In November 2024, Woewodin was appointed general manager of football operations at East Fremantle Football Club.

== Personal life ==
Woewodin married Deanne Price in 2003. They have four children—Shaye (Deanne's son from a previous relationship), Taj, Sienna and Summer. On 25 November 2021 his son Taj was drafted by Melbourne (pick 65) under the father-son rule.

== Playing statistics ==
Legend
G	Goals	K	Kicks	D	Disposals	T	Tackles
B	Behinds	H	Handballs	M	Marks

Season	Team	No.	Games	Totals							Averages (per game)						
Season	Team	No.	Games	G	B	K	H	D	M	T	G	B	K	H	D	M	T
1997	Melbourne	22	22	4	4	169	79	248	74	22	0.2	0.2	7.7	3.6	11.3	3.4	1.0
1998	Melbourne	22	25	10	10	316	136	452	127	33	0.4	0.4	12.6	5.4	18.1	5.1	1.3
1999	Melbourne	22	22	10	7	256	104	360	91	20	0.5	0.3	11.6	4.7	16.4	4.1	0.9
2000	Melbourne	22	25	20	16	367	187	554	107	64	0.8	0.6	14.7	7.5	22.2	4.3	2.6
2001	Melbourne	22	20	7	8	215	98	313	61	33	0.4	0.4	10.8	4.9	15.7	3.1	1.7
2002	Melbourne	22	24	12	9	296	170	466	98	73	0.5	0.4	12.3	7.1	19.4	4.1	3.0
2003	Collingwood	2	25	16	12	322	152	474	115	66	0.6	0.5	12.9	6.1	19.0	4.6	2.6
2004	Collingwood	2	22	10	12	314	120	434	96	64	0.5	0.5	14.3	5.5	19.7	4.4	2.9
2005	Collingwood	2	15	5	7	169	73	242	63	31	0.3	0.5	11.3	4.9	16.1	4.2	2.1
Career			200	94	85	2424	1119	3543	832	406	0.4	0.4	12.1	5.6	17.7	4.2	2.0

== Honours and achievements ==
**Brownlow Medal votes**
Season	Votes
1997	2
1998	6
1999	4
**2000**	**24**
2001	4
2002	3
2003	12
2004	2
2005	—
**Total**	**57**
Key:
Green / **Bold** = Won

- **Individual**
  - Brownlow Medal: 2000
  - Keith 'Bluey' Truscott Medal: 2000
  - Australian Representative Honours in International Rules Football: 2000
  - AFL Rising Star nominee: 1997 (Round 10)
