= Greg Wells (footballer, born 1950) =

Australian rules footballer (born 1950)

Personal information
- Full name: Greg Wells
- Born: 6 June 1950 (age 76)
- Original team: Bentleigh-McKinnon YC
- Height: 175 cm (5 ft 9 in)
- Weight: 80 kg (176 lb)
- Position: Midfielder

Playing career^{1}
Years	Club	Games (Goals)
1969–1980	Melbourne	224 (251)
1980–1982	Carlton	43 (24)
1980–1982	Moorabbin Football Club	10 (25)
Total		277 (300)
- ^{1} Playing statistics correct to the end of 1982.

Career highlights
- VFL premiership: 1981; 2× Keith 'Bluey' Truscott Medallist: 1971, 1976; Melbourne leading goalkicker: 1975; Melbourne captain: 1977–1978; Melbourne Team of the Century–emergency; Melbourne Hall of Fame

Greg Wells (born 6 June 1950) is a former Australian rules footballer who played with Melbourne and Carlton in the Victorian Football League (VFL) during the 1970s and early 1980s.

Wells usually played as a centreman or rover. During the 1969 season Wells played in the thirds, seconds and senior Melbourne sides in successive weeks. He finished runner-up in the 1972 Brownlow Medal and equal fourth in 1976. Wells also won Melbourne's best and fairest award in both 1971 and 1976.

The 1980 season was his last for Melbourne and he crossed mid year to Carlton where he attempted to finish his career with a premiership. He was a member of Carlton's 1981 premiership side.

In 1983, he moved to the Moorabbin Football Club in the Victorian Football Association (VFA) second division, serving as its inaugural VFA captain.

== Playing statistics ==
Legend
G	Goals	K	Kicks	D	Disposals	T	Tackles
B	Behinds	H	Handballs	M	Marks

Season	Team	No.	Games	Totals							Averages (per game)						
Season	Team	No.	Games	G	B	K	H	D	M	T	G	B	K	H	D	M	T
1969	Melbourne	50	3	10	4	51	13	64	10	—N/a	3.3	1.3	17.0	4.3	21.3	3.3	—N/a
1970	Melbourne	11	20	19	25	267	50	317	52	—N/a	1.0	1.3	13.4	2.5	15.9	2.6	—N/a
1971	Melbourne	11	18	11	17	316	38	354	89	—N/a	0.6	0.9	17.6	2.1	19.7	4.9	—N/a
1972	Melbourne	11	22	34	29	444	52	496	114	—N/a	1.5	1.3	20.2	2.4	22.5	5.2	—N/a
1973	Melbourne	11	21	20	39	459	77	536	113	—N/a	1.0	1.9	21.9	3.7	25.5	5.4	—N/a
1974	Melbourne	11	22	26	30	474	91	565	97	—N/a	1.2	1.4	21.5	4.1	25.7	4.4	—N/a
1975	Melbourne	11	21	32	33	388	70	458	81	—N/a	1.5	1.7	19.4	3.5	22.9	4.0	—N/a
1976	Melbourne	11	22	31	29	477	107	584	105	—N/a	1.4	1.3	21.7	4.9	26.5	4.8	—N/a
1977	Melbourne	11	21	23	19	416	93	509	94	—N/a	1.1	1.0	19.8	4.4	24.2	4.5	—N/a
1978	Melbourne	11	20	17	26	374	120	494	121	—N/a	0.9	1.4	18.7	6.0	24.7	6.1	—N/a
1979	Melbourne	11	22	24	39	412	132	544	133	—N/a	1.1	1.8	18.7	6.0	24.7	6.0	—N/a
1980	Melbourne	11	12	4	6	202	99	301	60	—N/a	0.3	0.5	16.8	8.3	25.1	5.0	—N/a
1980	Carlton	11	10	9	11	175	84	259	61	—N/a	0.9	1.1	17.5	8.4	25.9	6.1	—N/a
1981	Carlton	1	22	13	14	309	111	420	77	—N/a	0.6	0.6	14.0	5.0	19.1	3.5	—N/a
1982	Carlton	1	11	2	10	126	44	270	31	—N/a	0.2	0.9	11.5	4.0	15.5	2.8	—N/a
Career			267	275	331	4890	1181	6071	1238	—N/a	1.0	1.3	18.4	4.4	22.8	4.7	—N/a
