= Jim Cardwell =

Australian rules footballer

- Born: James Hector Cardwell; 2 February 1916; Port Melbourne, Victoria
- Died: 23 December 1996 (aged 80)
- Known for: Secretary of the Melbourne Football Club (1951–75)

James Hector Cardwell (2 February 1916 – 23 December 1996) was an Australian rules football player who served in the Australian Army in World War II. However, he became most well known for his administrative work for the Melbourne Football Club, where he served as secretary for 25 years, was made a life member and was inducted into the club Hall of Fame.

== Early life ==
Cardwell was born in Port Melbourne on 2 February 1916. Cardwell was a keen debater in his youth, winning the Victorian Solo Debating Championship twice, in 1934 and 1935.

== Playing career ==
Cardwell began his playing career with the CYMS Football Association club North Brunswick CYMS and won their best and fairest award. He was subsequently recruited by the Melbourne Football Club, who played in the Victorian Football League (VFL). Cardwell never broke into Melbourne's senior team, but played regularly in the reserves. In his first season with the Demons he was a member of Melbourne's VFL reserves 1939 premiership team. During his time playing in the reserves, Cardwell began to show an interest in the administrative side of the game, becoming a delegate to the VFL for the Demons' reserves side.

== World War II ==
Cardwell enlisted to the Australian Army on 23 December 1941 in Caulfield to fight in World War II. He served in Darwin and New Guinea. At one point during his service, when he was on leave, Cardwell was given an opportunity to make his senior VFL debut for the Demons, but he instead decided to take a honeymoon with his wife, Mavis. This was to be Cardwell's only opportunity to play VFL football and he retired having never played a senior match in the VFL. Cardwell was discharged from the Army after the conclusion of World War II, on 22 November 1945. At the time of his discharge, Cardwell was serving as a sergeant with the 2/1 Australian Mechanical Equipment Company.

== "The Prince of Secretaries" ==
When the war finished, Cardwell became an assistant engineer with the Forest Commission and in 1948 he opened his own engineering business in Melbourne. He also began to increase his work with Melbourne, becoming a selector of the Melbourne reserves team. He then became secretary of the reserves in 1949 and secretary of the seniors in 1951, taking over from A. S. Thompson. Cardwell, along with Albert Chadwick, who became president in 1950, Norm Smith, who became coach in 1952, Ivor Warne-Smith, who was the chairman of selectors, and former coach Frank 'Checker' Hughes, who was in charge of what would now be labelled the football department, became what has been described as Melbourne's "backbone of steel". In 1956, Cardwell had a breakdown, due to working two jobs, which required a long recuperation. The club subsequently offered to pay Cardwell to become a full-time secretary. Cardwell, saying he was "hooked on football", accepted the job and gave up his engineering business, thereby becoming the first full-time secretary in the VFL.

Cardwell's full-time appointment proved to be a success, with Melbourne winning six premierships in just 14 years. Although Cardwell often clashed with Smith, who he had recruited from Fitzroy, and who went on to become the AFL Coach of the Century, they were close friends. Cardwell was secretary in the days before country zoning and part of his role included recruiting. He had a "relentless desire" to search for the very best country football players. Due to his talent for convincing players to sign with Melbourne rather than rival teams, Cardwell was called "The Prince of Secretaries" and "The Doyen of Secretaries". He was considered the greatest Australian rules football talent scout of his era, with the success that Melbourne had during his employment a testament to his recruiting prowess.

Cardwell retired at the end of the 1975 season, having served as secretary for 25 years, and serving the club in other roles for over 35 years. He was succeeded in the post by Ivan Moore. Cardwell retained an active passion for the club until his death on 23 December 1996 after a long illness.

== Legacy ==
Cardwell recruited many of Melbourne's premiership greats, including Laurie Mithen, John Beckwith, Frank Adams, Brian Dixon, Athol Webb, Tassie Johnson, Ian Ridley, Bob Johnson and Hassa Mann. He was one of the inaugural inductees into the Melbourne Football Club Hall of Fame in 2001. Cardwell was also made a life member of the Melbourne Football Club in 1960. Ron Barassi named Cardwell as one of his "Top five MFC heroes" in 2008.
