= Allan La Fontaine =

Australian rules footballer

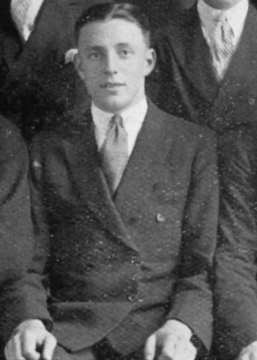

Personal information
- Full name: Allan Faulkner La Fontaine
- Born: 5 December 1910; Eskdale, Victoria, Australia
- Died: 14 August 1999 (aged 88); Sydney, New South Wales, Australia
- Original team: University Blacks
- Height: 175 cm (5 ft 9 in)
- Weight: 81 kg (179 lb)
- Position: Centreman

Playing career^{1}
Years	Club	Games (Goals)
1934–1942, 1945	Melbourne	171 (77)

Representative team honours
Years	Team	Games (Goals)
1934, 1936	Victoria	2 (0)

Coaching career
Years	Club	Games (W–L–D)
1949–1951	Melbourne	56 (25–31–0)
- ^{1} Playing statistics correct to the end of 1945.

Career highlights
- 3× VFL premierships: 1939, 1940, 1941; 4× Keith 'Bluey' Truscott Medallist: 1935, 1936, 1941, 1942; Melbourne captain: 1936–1941; Melbourne Team of the Century (centre); Australian Football Hall of Fame; Melbourne Hall of Fame; Harold Ball Memorial Trophy: 1934; St. Kevin's College, Melbourne: Team of the Century (centre)

Allan Faulkner La Fontaine (5 December 1910 – 14 August 1999) was an Australian rules footballer who played with and coached Melbourne in the Victorian Football League (VFL).

== Private life ==
La Fontaine was born at the country town of Eskdale, Victoria. While still a youngster, his parents, Cyrelle and Beatrice, brought the family to Melbourne, where they settled in the suburb of Footscray. He had three brothers, Claude, Lionel and Donald. La Fontaine attended St Joseph's CBC North Melbourne (later St Joseph's College, Melbourne) from 1925 to 1929, where he earned the title Captain of College three years in a row: 1927, 1928 and 1929.

At school, he made his mark as both an excellent athlete, handball player and footballer. In 1930, he went on to complete his secondary education at St Kevin's College, Melbourne, before proceeding to university where he was eventually granted Bachelor of Science in 1946.

La Fontaine enjoyed a variety of activities which included boxing, cricket and in 1936 working as a seaman on an oil tanker bound for America.

In July 1940, La Fontaine married Mary Williams at St Patrick's Cathedral.

During World War II, he served as a Flying Officer with the RAAF between 1942 and 1945, and he saw action in New Guinea and the nearby islands. Two of his brothers served in the Australian Army during the same conflict. On his return he took up his trade as an industrial chemist and analyst in a Melbourne business.

La Fontaine died in Sydney in August 1999.

== Football career ==
Recruited to the Old Paradians by its founder Lou Arthur, La Fontaine vindicated the transport magnate's faith by kicking 146 goals for the home-and-away season (152 including finals), which was easily a record in any Metropolitan Amateur Football Association (MAFA) division since the competition began in 1892. His football career changed dramatically when he was later recruited from University Blacks. In his last amateur season in 1933, he kicked a record 197 goals for the season.

La Fontaine was considered a brilliant amateur full-forward, and was to earn his fame playing with the Melbourne Football Club as a centreman. He was appointed captain of Melbourne in 1936. He led the club to their hat-trick of premierships in 1939, 1940 and 1941. La Fontaine went on to coach Melbourne from 1949 until 1951.

In 1996 La Fontaine was inducted into the Australian Football Hall of Fame.

== Sources ==
- Ross, John (1999). The Australian Football Hall of Fame. Australia: HarperCollinsPublishers. p. 87. ISBN 0-7322-6426-X.
- Second World War Nomonal Roll: Flying Officer Allan Faulkiner La Fontaine (119471).
