= Ron Baggott =

Australian rules footballer, born 1917

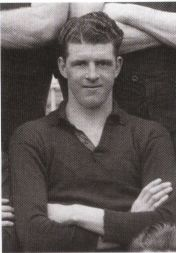

Personal information
- Full name: Ronald Idris Baggott
- Born: 16 January 1917; South Melbourne, Victoria
- Died: 26 April 2013 (aged 96)
- Original team: Northcote Church of Christ
- Height: 183 cm (6 ft 0 in)
- Weight: 76 kg (168 lb)

Playing career^{1}
Years	Club	Games (Goals)
1935–1945	Melbourne	133 (308)
- ^{1} Playing statistics correct to the end of 1945.

Career highlights
- 2 x VFL Reserves Premierships: 1934, 1935; 3× VFL premiership player: 1939, 1940, 1941; Keith 'Bluey' Truscott Medallist: 1940; Melbourne leading goalkicker: 1937; Melbourne Hall of Fame

Ronald Idris Baggott (16 January 1917 – 26 April 2013) was an Australian rules footballer who played with Melbourne in the Victorian Football League (VFL). He later captain-coached Brunswick in the throw-pass era Victorian Football Association.

Baggot played 14 first eleven games of Victorian Premier Cricket with Northcote Cricket Club.

He was the younger brother of Jack Baggott who played for Richmond.
