= Roy Dowsing =

Australian rules footballer, born 1915

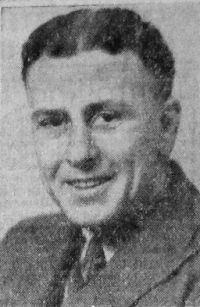

Personal information
- Full name: Roy Dowsing
- Born: 23 October 1915
- Died: 13 December 1973 (aged 58)
- Original team: South Camberwell
- Height: 170 cm (5 ft 7 in)
- Weight: 67 kg (148 lb)
- Position: Wing

Playing career^{1}
Years	Club	Games (Goals)
1939–46	Melbourne	105 (45)
- ^{1} Playing statistics correct to the end of 1946.

Roy Dowsing (23 October 1915 – 13 December 1973) was an Australian rules footballer who played with Melbourne in the Victorian Football League (VFL). His football career lasted from 1939 to 1946.

== Career ==
Roy Dowsing played for Melbourne Football Club throughout his career. Dowsing's debut game was Round 14 in 1939 against St Kilda Football Club at Junction Oval. He scored the first goal of the match, leading Melbourne to win by 24 points. His last game was Round 18 in 1946 against Fitzroy Football Club at Brunswick Street Oval.
