= Stan Fairbairn =

Australian rules footballer (1886–1943)

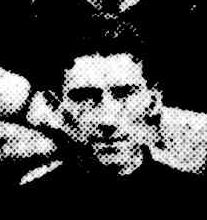

Personal information
- Full name: Stanley John Fairbairn
- Born: 14 July 1886; Camperdown, Victoria
- Died: 26 February 1943 (aged 56); Dandenong, Victoria
- Original team: South Ballarat

Playing career^{1}
Years	Club	Games (Goals)
1910–11, 1914	Melbourne	30 (41)
- ^{1} Playing statistics correct to the end of 1914.

Stanley John Fairbairn (14 July 1886 – 26 February 1943) was an Australian rules footballer who played with Melbourne in the Victorian Football League (VFL).
