= Barry Bourke =

Australian rules footballer

Personal information
- Born: 14 September 1943 (age 83)
- Original team: Neerim-Neerim South
- Height: 179 cm (5 ft 10 in)
- Weight: 77 kg (170 lb)

Playing career^{1}
Years	Club	Games (Goals)
1963–1973	Melbourne	175 (154)
- ^{1} Playing statistics correct to the end of 1973.

Career highlights
- VFL premiership: 1964; Melbourne leading goalkicker: 1963; Harold Ball Memorial Trophy: 1963; Melbourne Hall of Fame

Barry Bourke (born 14 September 1943) is a former Australian rules footballer who played for Melbourne in the Victorian Football League (VFL).

Bourke started his career in the forwardline, topping Melbourne's goalkicking with 48 goals in his debut season. Most of his subsequent games were spent in defence with the occasional stints up forward. He was a premiership player with Melbourne in 1964 and was a regular Victorian representative at interstate football.
