= James Moss Cardwell =

- Born: January 17, 1926; Fort Smith, Arkansas, U.S.
- Died: April 11, 1990 (aged 64); Pensacola, Florida, U.S.
- Education: Pomona College
- Occupations: Writer, educator
- Writing career
- Pen name: Adobe James

James Moss Cardwell (January 17, 1926 – April 11, 1990), (Note: Most sources support the 1926 birth year, although some library records state 1929.) who used the pen name Adobe James, was an American writer and educator.

He is best known for his horror stories, such as The Ohio Love Sculpture and The Road to Mictlantecutli, which appeared in anthologies edited by Alfred Hitchcock, Herbert van Thal, and others. He also wrote short stories and articles for men's magazines.

== Career ==
Cardwell was a president of California's Monterey Peninsula College, and a long-standing member of the Diogenes Club, a Sherlock Holmes appreciation society. His unproduced musical play "Mrs. Hudson? Mrs. Hudson!!", a Sherlockian pastiche, was published posthumously in 2000, with illustrations by Jean-Pierre Cagnat.

Cardwell was survived by his third wife, Julie.

== Selected bibliography ==
=== Short stories ===
As Adobe James:

- The Ohio Love Sculpture (1963)
- I'll Love You – Always (1964)
- The Revenge (1964)
- Puppetmaster (1965)
- The Road to Mictlantecutli (1965)
- Tomorrow and ... Tomorrow (1967)
- An Apparition at Noon (1968)
- The Spelling Bee (1989)

According to one source Cardwell used another pseudonym, James McArdwell, to write The Green Umbilical Cord (1968).

=== Play ===
- "Mrs. Hudson? ... Mrs. Hudson!!" (2000) (published posthumously as James Moss Cardwell) ISBN 978-1552462072

== Influences ==
Cardwell's editor, Michael Kean, has discussed similarities between Cardwell's 1967 story "Tomorrow and Tomorrow" and Michael Winner's 1974 film Death Wish. Cardwell's 1964 story "The Revenge" closely resembles a 1947 story, "Revenge" – attributed to an otherwise unknown writer, Samuel Blas – which was twice adapted for television's Alfred Hitchcock Presents (in 1955 and 1985), and was also used as a plot in a number of horror comics. However, as Cardwell is not credited for these adaptations, it remains unclear whether these similarities are coincidental.
