= 2000 Brownlow Medal =

- Winner: Shane Woewodin (Melbourne); 24 votes

Television/radio coverage
- Network: Seven Network

The 2000 Brownlow Medal was the 73rd year the award was presented to the player adjudged the fairest and best player during the Australian Football League (AFL) home-and-away season. Shane Woewodin of the Melbourne Football Club won the medal by polling twenty-four votes during the 2000 AFL season.

The Essendon Football Club set a record for the highest number of votes collected as a team, with 116 out of a possible 132 votes. The club polled at least one vote in every game, including all six votes in 14 games.

== Leading vote-getters ==
	Player	Votes
1st	Shane Woewodin (Melbourne)	24
2nd	Scott West (Western Bulldogs)	22
3rd	Andrew McLeod (Adelaide)	20
4th	Anthony Koutoufides (Carlton)	19
=5th	Nathan Buckley (Collingwood)	18
=5th	Brett Ratten (Carlton)	18
=7th	Michael O'Loughlin (Sydney)	16
=7th	Michael Voss (Brisbane Lions)	16
=7th	James Hird (Essendon)	16
=10th	Wayne Carey (Kangaroos)	14
=10th	Nick Holland (Hawthorn)	14
=10th	Adem Yze (Melbourne)	14
=10th	Brent Harvey (Kangaroos)	14
=10th	Tony Liberatore (Western Bulldogs)	14
=10th	Matthew Lloyd (Essendon)	14
