= Norm Smith =

Australian rules footballer (1915-1973)

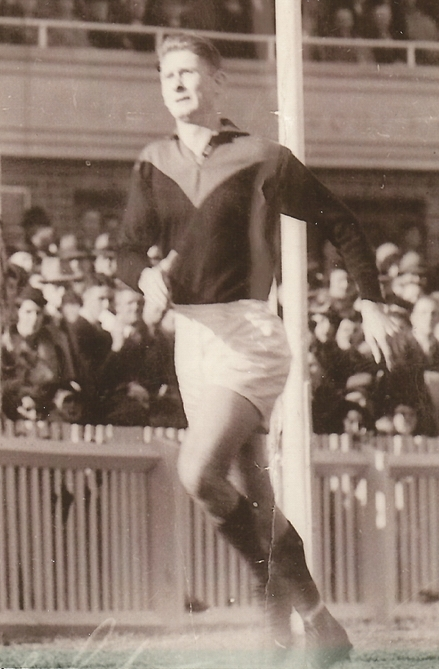
- Norm Smith playing for Melbourne, c. 1940s

Personal information
- Nickname: The Red Fox
- Born: 21 November 1915; Clifton Hill, Victoria, Australia
- Died: 29 July 1973 (aged 57); Pascoe Vale, Victoria, Australia
- Original team: Northcote juniors
- Height: 183 cm (6 ft 0 in)
- Weight: 81 kg (179 lb)
- Position: Full-forward

Playing career^{1}
Years	Club	Games (Goals)
1935–1948	Melbourne	210 (546)
1949–1950	Fitzroy	17 (26)
Total		227 (572)

Representative team honours^{2}
Years	Team	Games (Goals)
1941–1945	Victoria	2 (9)

Coaching career^{3}
Years	Club	Games (W–L–D)
1949–1951	Fitzroy	55 (30–23–2)
1952–1967	Melbourne	310 (197–108–5)
1969–1972	South Melbourne	87 (26–61–0)
Total		452 (253–192–7)
- ^{1} Playing statistics correct to the end of 1950.^{2} Representative statistics correct as of 1945.^{3} Coaching statistics correct as of 1972.

Career highlights
- Player: 4× VFL premierships: 1939, 1940, 1941, 1948; 2× Keith 'Bluey' Truscott Medallist: 1938, 1944; 4× Melbourne leading goalkicker: 1938, 1939, 1940, 1941; Melbourne captain: 1945–1947; Fitzroy captain: 1949–1950; Melbourne Team of the Century (full forward); Coach: 6× VFL premierships: 1955, 1956, 1957, 1959, 1960, 1964; AFL Team of the Century (coach); Melbourne Team of the Century (coach); Overall: Australian Football Hall of Fame (legend status); Melbourne Hall of Fame (legend status)

Norman Walter Smith (21 November 1915 – 29 July 1973) was an Australian rules football player and coach in the Victorian Football League (VFL). After more than 200 games as a player with Melbourne and Fitzroy, Smith began a twenty-year coaching career, including a fifteen-year stint at Melbourne.

A revered figure in the Australian Football Hall of Fame, Smith is widely regarded as one of the greatest and most influential coaches in the game's history, as well as having been considered by many one of the finest full-forwards of his era. Like legendary Collingwood coach Jock McHale, Smith was seen as able to take young players of different backgrounds and mould them into a disciplined team. Along with his brother Len, Smith's ability to think innovatively when it came to tactics had a profound influence on the game, most notably through his protégé Ron Barassi.

Smith played in four premierships with Melbourne and then coached the club to six further premierships in the 1950s and 1960s, but his sensational sacking midway through the 1965 season (when Melbourne were the reigning premiers) gave rise to what is known as the "Curse of Norm Smith". The supposed curse lasted 57 years until Melbourne defeated the Western Bulldogs in the 2021 AFL Grand Final. In 1996, Smith was chosen as the coach of the AFL Team of the Century.

== Personal life ==
Smith and elder brother Len (b. 1912) were the sons of ironworker Victor Smith and Ethel May (née Brown). After attending Westgarth Central School, Smith completed an engineering apprenticeship and worked at Millers rope-works in Brunswick. In 1943, he took over his father's engineering business in Northcote, later relocating it to North Coburg in 1954. On 19 October 1940, he married Marjorie Victoria Ellis, at the Wesley Church in Melbourne. Their only child, Peter, was born in 1947.

== Playing career ==
A brilliant all-round sportsman in his youth, Smith played first-grade district cricket and Australian football. His first club football was for Dennis, which played in the sub-district competition, where his brother Len had started his career. When scouts for VFL club Melbourne arrived at the Smith household to sign Len, Victor Smith suggested that young Norm might make the grade as well. Melbourne were ambitiously rebuilding their side and Smith made his debut under legendary coach Frank 'Checker' Hughes in 1935. Ironically, while Norm's career blossomed at Melbourne, brother Len failed to nail down a regular place and he moved to the VFA and later to Fitzroy to further his career.

=== Outstanding on-field success ===
Smith became a regular in the first team in 1937. Usually playing as full-forward, Smith quickly developed an understanding with teammate Ron Baggott and earned a reputation as a cool-headed, "thinking" player. He favoured the pass to a man in a better position, the quick handball, the tap on and the shepherd for a teammate with the ball. One scribe commented that he "could make a forward line work around him" and he was the epitome of a team player. The Melbourne team was rising fast: they played finals in 1936 and 1937, but lost to more experienced opponents both times. The team took a step back in 1938, finishing fifth, but looked the team most likely throughout 1939.

Under Hughes, a successful former Richmond player and coach, Melbourne had remade themselves into a more professional outfit, after many years as an amateur club. Smith was one of many talented players who adhered to Hughes' doctrine. Now renamed the Red Demons (later to become simply the Demons), Melbourne went into the 1939 finals with a team based on all-out attack, with Smith the linchpin. In the Grand Final against Collingwood, Melbourne booted a record Grand Final score and set a new record winning margin, taking only their third premiership in 39 years. Another flag was won in 1940 when Smith was the star, scoring seven goals in the Grand Final. The following year, the team marked themselves as a special combination by completing the hattrick, despite missing players due to war service and injury on Grand Final day. Smith enjoyed his most productive season and finished the year as the VFL's leading goalkicker. He continued playing during the war years in a decimated Melbourne team. In 1944 Smith won The Herald newspaper's best player award.

=== Captaincy and the Miracle of '48 ===
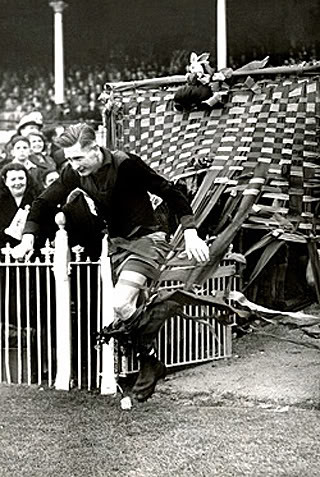
Smith emerging onto the field for the 1946 VFL Grand Final

Smith was appointed captain of the club in 1945, leading the Demons to their first Grand Final defeat in 1946. Poor form and a loss of confidence led to Smith resigning the captaincy for 1948 and it seemed that, at 32, his career was winding down. Melbourne were thrashed by Essendon in the second semi final and were long odds to win the premiership. However, in something of a miracle, previously retired champion Jack Mueller was recalled to the team and in the next three games (which included a tied and replayed Grand Final) Smith and Mueller combined to dominate the scoring and lead the Demons to an unlikely premiership. Deciding that it was a perfect note on which to end his marathon career, 'Checker' Hughes retired as coach, and Smith was a keen applicant for the position.

== Coaching career ==
Disappointingly for Smith, the committee decided (by a single vote) to award the job to ex-Melbourne premiership skipper, Allan LaFontaine. Anxious to begin coaching, Smith made an emotionally difficult decision to transfer to Fitzroy as captain-coach. His older brother Len was already there as coach of the Under 19's. Smith played only seventeen games with the 'Roys before retiring as a player in 1950. His time at Fitzroy was a mixed bag: the team was competitive without making the finals. Meanwhile, Melbourne were struggling and LaFontaine resigned after three years. So in 1952, Smith returned to Melbourne as coach. Benefiting from the recruitment of some of the best players in the club's history, Smith and Melbourne dominated the VFL for a decade, during which the club won six premierships: 1955-56-57, 1959–60 and 1964.

=== Coaching style ===
A stickler for team discipline, Smith was variously called the 'Demon Dictator' and the 'Martinet of Melbourne'. His canniness and brushed-back auburn hair earned him another nickname: the 'Red Fox'. Smith built his success on an espirit de corps, creating close-knit teams during Melbourne's years of greatness that were the envy of the other eleven clubs. Many sought to emulate his methods and create a similar atmosphere for their own clubs. Norm and Len Smith (who coached Fitzroy from 1958 to 1962) led the move toward a quicker, play-on style of football. Melbourne sides under Smith were fast, disciplined, fit and confident. The only real lapse of discipline came in the 1958 Grand Final when, attempting to equal Collingwood's great four-in-a-row record, the Demons were baited into losing their concentration by a fanatical Collingwood team.

=== The dismissal ===
From 1964 tension began to build between Smith and several influential figures at Melbourne. One factor was the decision by Melbourne's star player, Ron Barassi, to move to Carlton in 1965 as captain-coach. Barassi had lived with Smith and his wife from the time he was 15 – Barassi became the older man's protege and the two enjoying a unique relationship. Smith supported Barassi's aspirations, offering to stand aside so Barassi could coach Melbourne. When Barassi rejected that proposal and insisted on a clearance to the Blues, some Melbourne officials unfairly accused Smith of ridding himself of a potential rival. Another factor was Smith's sometimes acid tongue, which he sometimes turned on committeemen he felt were interfering in his domain. This facet of the Smith personality put him in a difficult situation when he was sued by an umpire for defamation. In defending the action, Smith found no support from the men running his club.

Finally, the situation exploded on the Friday night before the round 13, 1965 match against North Melbourne. A courier delivered a termination notice to Smith at his home. When the news leaked to the media, it created a sensation, arguably the most dramatic news story in Australian football history. Smith made an emotional appearance on television on the Sunday and speculation was rife that he would replace his ill brother, then coaching Richmond. Although he was reinstated within a week, he never again enjoyed his old relationship with the club. The Demons won only one more game for the year and missed the finals for the first time in eleven years. In a matter of a few dramatic months, Melbourne's dominance was dismantled. The Demons would not make the finals again until 1987.

=== A brief return to the finals ===
After two more disappointing seasons, heart disease compelled Smith to resign from Melbourne at the end of 1967. It was a sad year for the Smith family, as brother Len had succumbed to a heart attack just months before his adopted club Richmond won the premiership. Feeling sufficiently recovered, Smith surprised many by accepting an offer to coach South Melbourne in 1969. At Albert Park, Smith pulled off what was considered one of his best coaching performances by taking the downtrodden Swans to the 1970 semi-final, their first finals appearance since 1945. However, the under-resourced and under-confident Swans couldn't sustain the effort and finished last and second last in the next two years. Smith resigned after the 1972 season.

== Death and legacy ==
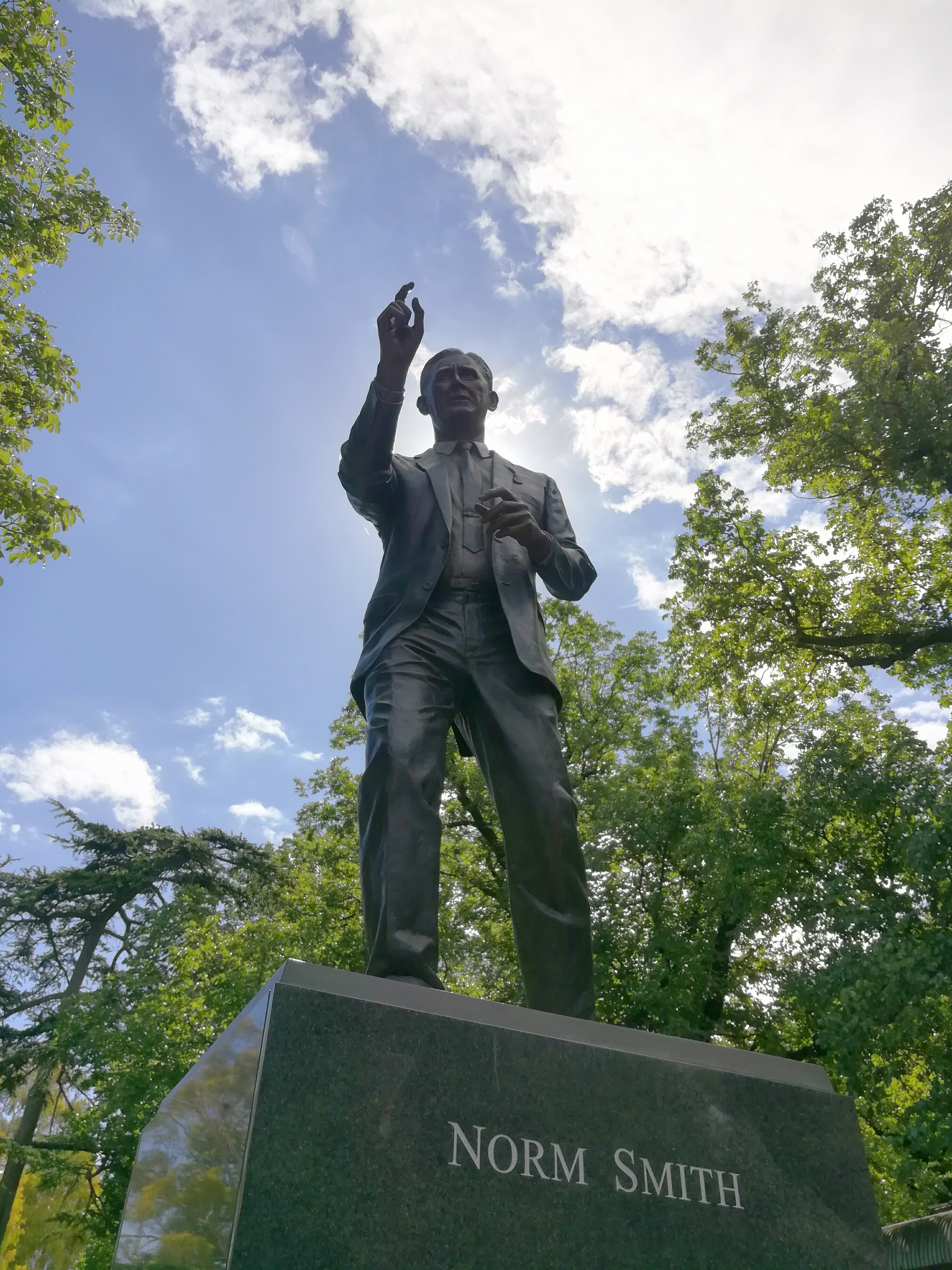
Statue of Smith in Yarra Park

Norm Smith was only 57 when he died of a cerebral tumour at his home in Pascoe Vale on 29 July 1973. He was survived by his wife and son.

Smith's influence was wide-ranging. He increased the importance of the coach in Australian football with innovations such as using a runner to send messages to his players (in 1955). He raised the standards of fitness and team discipline, which enabled the evolution of the so-called "running game" in the 1970s. Although his blunt manner of speaking and intolerance for fools sometimes led him to conflict, he was universally admired and respected for his insightful thinking on the game and his mantra that teamwork was all. Although he was known as a great orator and a stern taskmaster, he was a quiet and retiring man away from the game. Paradoxically, he played and coached largely for the love of the game yet did as much as anyone else to move it forward from a semi-professional sport.

During the 1970s, Smith's son Peter played for Melbourne and Carlton in the VFL and for Coburg in the VFA as a full-forward and was Coburg's leading goalkicker for a season.

On 19 July 2007, Norm Smith was inducted into the Australian Football Hall of Fame as a playing Legend.

== Norm Smith Medal and Norm Smith Memorial Trophy ==
See main article: Norm Smith Medal

In 1979, the VFL instituted the Norm Smith Medal, awarded to the best player in the Grand Final. The first winner was Norm Smith's great nephew and Carlton player Wayne Harmes (Len Smith's grandson). He received the medal from Norm's widow, Marj.

In addition to the Norm Smith Medal, the Norm Smith Memorial Trophy is a Coaches Award "presented to the player who best represents the qualities of work ethic and preparation" at the Melbourne Football Club during their annual best and fairest award ceremony.

== Bibliography ==
- Collins, Ben (2008). The Red Fox, The Biography of Norm Smith Legendary Melbourne Coach. Australia: The Slattery Media Group. ISBN 978-0-9803466-2-6.
- Hess, Rob; Nicholson, Matthew; Stewart, Bob; de Moore, Gregory (2008). A National Game : The History of Australian Rules Football. Camberwell, VIC: Penguin Group (Australia). ISBN 9780670070893.
- Ross, John (1999). The Australian Football Hall of Fame. Australia: HarperCollinsPublishers. p. 120. ISBN 0-7322-6426-X.
