= List of VFL debuts in 1979 =

The 1979 Victorian Football League (VFL) season was the eighty third season of the VFL. The season saw 76 Australian rules footballers make their senior VFL debut and 41 players transferring to new clubs having previously played in the VFL.

== Debuts ==
Name	Club	Age at debut	Round debuted	Games	Goals	Notes
Wayne Johnston	Carlton	21 years, 102 days	3	209	283	
Alex Marcou	Carlton	20 years, 268 days	1	134	148	
Robbert Klomp	Carlton	23 years, 321 days	1	84	17	
Peter Francis	Carlton	21 years, 74 days	1	47	15	
Michael Jez	Carlton	25 years, 72 days	20	2	0	
Peter Daicos	Collingwood	17 years, 220 days	4	250	549	
Denis Banks	Collingwood	19 years, 337 days	7	166	111	
Craig Davis	Collingwood	24 years, 187 days	1	102	251	Previously played for Carlton and North Melbourne. Father of Nick Davis.
David Twomey	Collingwood	18 years, 150 days	16	63	14	
Mark Hannebery	Collingwood	21 years, 237 days	9	61	23	
Russell Ohlsen	Collingwood	23 years, 141 days	3	50	22	Previously played for Carlton.
Ross Brewer	Collingwood	25 years, 347 days	14	47	85	Previously played for Melbourne. Brother of Ian Brewer.
Allan Edwards	Collingwood	21 years, 251 days	16	35	45	Previously played for Richmond. Grandson of Frank Aked, son of Arthur Edwards and father of Jake Edwards.
Michael Woolnough	Collingwood	26 years, 202 days	2	24	8	Previously played for Geelong. Father of Marc Woolnough.
David Young	Collingwood	25 years, 150 days	22	18	12	Previously played for South Melbourne.
Bill Valli	Collingwood	28 years, 356 days	1	17	17	
Mark Dreher	Collingwood	18 years, 154 days	20	15	0	
Geoff Austen	Collingwood	25 years, 176 days	1	13	3	Previously played for Fitzroy.
Stephen Roach	Collingwood	20 years, 291 days	1	4	0	Previously played for Richmond.
Mick Warren	Collingwood	20 years, 46 days	1	3	0	
Darren Williams	Essendon	18 years, 204 days	5	109	94	
Frank Dunell	Essendon	21 years, 93 days	11	100	57	
Neale Daniher	Essendon	18 years, 44 days	3	82	32	Brother of Terry, Anthony and Chris Daniher
Alan Reid	Essendon	23 years, 61 days	3	52	18	
Peter Keenan	Essendon	27 years, 358 days	3	31	17	Previously played for Melbourne and North Melbourne
Barry Day	Essendon	25 years, 32 days	3	15	15	
Craig Barbary	Essendon	18 years, 291 days	4	8	5	
Kelvin Steel	Essendon	24 years, 30 days	14	6	0	Previously played for Hawthorn
Robert Hyde	Essendon	24 years, 311 days	EF	1	0	Previously played for Collingwood.
Leon Harris	Fitzroy	20 years, 177 days	5	186	101	
Michael Poynton	Fitzroy	17 years, 348 days	4	52	66	
Max Richardson	Fitzroy	30 years, 104 days	1	30	41	Previously played for Collingwood. Brother of Wayne Richardson
Kevin Higgins	Fitzroy	28 years, 46 days	1	25	0	Previously played for Geelong
Malcolm Bramley	Fitzroy	20 years, 56 days	1	5	2	
Keith MacLeod	Fitzroy	20 years, 091 days	1	2	0	
Neil Cordy	Footscray	20 years, 6 days	2	139	28	Brother of Brian and Graeme Cordy
Michael McKenna	Footscray	18 years, 115 days	17	102	55	
Bill Berry	Footscray	21 years, 354 days	11	43	18	Previously played for Essendon.
Gary Cowton	Footscray	26 years, 98 days	1	40	4	Previously played for North Melbourne.
Shane Loveless	Footscray	20 years, 123 days	1	28	72	
John Moylan	Footscray	26 years, 114 days	5	21	1	Previously played for North Melbourne.
Steven Hoffman	Footscray	27 years, 198 days	1	11	5	Previously played for South Melbourne.
Neil Bristow	Footscray	23 years, 135 days	1	10	4	
Mark Williams	Footscray	21 years, 203 days	15	5	1	Previously played for North Melbourne.
Gordon Polson	Footscray	20 years, 123 days	17	5	1	
Robbie Peers	Footscray	23 years, 196 days	4	3	0	
Shane Walsh	Footscray	20 years, 129 days	19	2	1	
Mark Bos	Geelong	18 years, 288 days	6	195	16	
John Mossop	Geelong	19 years, 297 days	1	134	87	
Peter Featherby	Geelong	27 years, 186 days	11	93	79	Previously played for Footscray
Peter Johnston	Geelong	21 years, 166 days	4	92	108	Previously played for Melbourne
Glen Middlemiss	Geelong	22 years, 303 days	1	34	29	
John Burns	Geelong	29 years, 240 days	1	17	10	Previously played for North Melbourne
Mario Bortolotto	Geelong	21 years, 362 days	12	14	2	
John Durnan	Geelong	21 years, 284 days	3	1	0	
Greg Nichols	Geelong	20 years, 224 days	20	1	0	
John Kennedy	Hawthorn	19 years, 171 days	6	241	210	Son of John Kennedy Sr. Father of Josh P. Kennedy.
Mark Turner	Hawthorn	19 years, 084 days	14	35	6	
Terry Moore	Hawthorn	27 years, 272 days	5	21	10	Previously played for North Melbourne.
Robert Polkinghorne	Hawthorn	21 years, 88 days	8	5	0	
Brendan McFaull	Hawthorn	21 years, 341 days	2	2	1	
Gerard Healy	Melbourne	18 years, 037 days	1	130	189	Won Brownlow Medal in 1988. Brother of Greg Healy
Peter Giles	Melbourne	20 years, 357 days	9	124	32	
Kelly O'Donnell	Melbourne	18 years, 156 days	3	80	67	
Tony Elshaug	Melbourne	19 years, 37 days	21	66	92	
Cameron Clayton	Melbourne	22 years, 110 days	8	44	18	Previously played for Richmond
Robert Elliott	Melbourne	25 years, 352 days	2	43	8	Previously played for St Kilda. Brother of Glenn Elliott
Wayne Gordon	Melbourne	25 years, 271 days	8	34	5	Previously played for Collingwood
Tony Martyn	Melbourne	22 years, 29 days	1	32	5	
Jim Durnan	Melbourne	19 years, 066 days	12	26	2	
Glenn Elliott	Melbourne	28 years, 235 days	1	15	11	Previously played for St Kilda. Brother of Robert Elliott
Phil Carman	Melbourne	28 years, 215 days	1	11	23	Previously played for Collingwood
Don Whitford	Melbourne	22 years, 161 days	4	10	3	Previously played for Fitzroy
Bruce Elliott	Melbourne	22 years, 279 days	5	5	0	
John Wallace	Melbourne	19 years, 232 days	3	2	0	
John Dellamarta	Melbourne	24 years, 242 days	4	2	1	Previously played for Collingwood
Stewart Gull	Melbourne	27 years, 319 days	7	2	1	Previously played for South Melbourne.
Gary Dempsey	North Melbourne	30 years, 136 days	1	122	39	Won 1975 Brownlow Medal. Previously played for Footscray.
Kevin Bryant	North Melbourne	24 years, 89 days	1	58	38	
Russell Ebert	North Melbourne	29 years, 289 days	1	25	15	Four time Magarey Medallist. Father of Brett Ebert
Shane Bond	North Melbourne	24 years, 305 days	3	9	8	Previously played for Collingwood
John Murphy	North Melbourne	29 years, 215 days	12	9	8	Previously played for Fitzroy and South Melbourne. Father of Marc Murphy
Graham Cornes	North Melbourne	31 years, 7 days	1	5	10	1980 Tassie Medallist. Father of Chad and Kane Cornes
Barry Rowlings	Richmond	28 years, 257 days	5	152	117	Previously played for Hawthorn
Graeme Landy	Richmond	25 years, 065 days	18	120	38	Previously played for Geelong
Robert Wiley	Richmond	24 years, 14 days	1	95	127	
Stephen Mount	Richmond	19 years, 33 days	1	31	9	
Shane Williams	Richmond	19 years, 308 days	11	27	14	
Peter Williams	Richmond	21 years, 149 days	6	7	1	
Craig Considine	Richmond	20 years, 19 days	14	7	1	
Kim Kershaw	Richmond	20 years, 100 days	5	5	0	
Rod Oborne	Richmond	25 years, 304 days	14	5	7	Previously played for Collingwood. Father of Brad Oborne.
Frank Bain	Richmond	19 years, 315 days	3	2	0	
Barrie Trotter	Richmond	19 years, 134 days	13	2	0	
Mark Kellett	St Kilda	18 years, 324 days	11	55	7	
Michael Nettlefold	St Kilda	19 years, 351 days	15	43	13	
Andrew Cross	St Kilda	18 years, 099 days	16	31	31	
Dean Herbert	St Kilda	23 years, 157 days	13	22	23	
Malcolm Scott	St Kilda	21 years, 087 days	14	10	26	
David Granger	St Kilda	24 years, 123 days	8	3	1	
Allan Sinclair	St Kilda	25 years, 326 days	5	2	1	Previously played for Fitzroy
Dean Ross	St Kilda	24 years, 150 days	11	2	1	
Gary Lugg	St Kilda	21 years, 25 days	13	1	0	
Stephen Wright	South Melbourne	18 years, 81 days	8	246	247	
Ian Roberts	South Melbourne	22 years, 88 days	13	157	33	
David Ackerly	South Melbourne	18 years, 194 days	10	138	12	
Max Kruse	South Melbourne	20 years, 244 days	13	126	32	
Wayne Carroll	South Melbourne	21 years, 114 days	15	123	57	Brother of Dennis Carroll
Len Thompson	South Melbourne	31 years, 223 days	8	20	39	Winner of Brownlow Medal in 1972. Previously played for Collingwood
Mark Fraser	South Melbourne	19 years, 245 days	9	20	1	
Doug Koop	South Melbourne	19 years, 13 days	18	15	15	
Jon Hummel	South Melbourne	22 years, 84 days	4	14	20	Previously played for Richmond
Dale Murphy	South Melbourne	19 years, 334 days	18	12	0	
Daryl Cumming	South Melbourne	27 years, 327 days	1	11	4	Previously played for Richmond, Melbourne and North Melbourne
Robert Lamb	South Melbourne	24 years, 136 days	9	7	10	Previously played for Richmond
Garry Williams	South Melbourne	22 years, 225 days	13	3	0	
Howard Tarpey	South Melbourne	21 years, 155 days	22	1	0	
