= Andrew Cross =

Andrew Cross may refer to:

- Andrew Cross (footballer) (born 1961), Australian rules footballer
- Andrew Cross Award, a British award for religious journalism

== See also ==
- Andrew Crosse (1784–1855), British scientist
- St. Andrew's Cross (disambiguation)
