= Steve Roach =

Steve Roach may refer to:

- Steve Roach (musician) (born 1955), American ambient music composer
- Steve Roach (rugby league) (born 1962), Australian rugby league footballer
- Stephen S. Roach (born 1945), economist
- Stephen Roach (footballer) (born 1958), Australian rules footballer
- Steven Roach, American police officer who was involved in the 2001 Cincinnati riots
- Steve Roach, editor of Coin World magazine

== See also ==
- Stephen Roche (born 1959), Irish cyclist
