= Fitzroy v Melbourne (1979 VFL season) =

Football match in the 1979 Victorian Football League season

1979 VFL Round 17

Fitzroy	Melbourne
36.22 (238)	6.12 (48)
	1	2	3	4
FITZ	7.7 (49)	14.14 (98)	26.17 (173)	36.22 (238)
MELB	2.1 (13)	2.5 (17)	4.8 (32)	6.12 (48)
- Date: 28 July 1979
- Stadium: VFL Park, Mulgrave, Victoria
- Attendance: 12,149

In Round 17, 1979, a Victorian Football League (VFL) home-and-away match was played between Fitzroy and Melbourne at VFL Park in Mulgrave, Victoria. The match saw Fitzroy record the largest victory in VFL/AFL history, defeating Melbourne by 190 points, and scoring a then-record 36.22 (238); only the former record remains unmatched as of 2026.

== Background ==
Going into round 17 of the 1979 VFL season, Fitzroy and Melbourne sat in third and eleventh place on the ladder, respectively.

== Match summary ==
Melbourne captain-coach Carl Ditterich was forced to coach the game from the sidelines due to an ankle injury, while Robert Flower missed the match with injury.

=== First quarter ===
Fitzroy kicked 7.7 (49) to Melbourne's 2.1 (13) in the first quarter.

=== Second quarter ===
Fitzroy doubled its first quarter score in the second quarter, though ended it having kicked five consecutive behinds. Melbourne failed to kick a goal, adding only four behinds to trail by 81 points at half-time.

=== Third quarter ===
Twelve goals to two saw Fitzroy extend the margin to 141 points by three-quarter-time.

=== Fourth quarter ===
When Harvey Merrigan kicked Fitzroy's 33rd goal at the 21-minute mark of the final quarter to take the score to 33.20 (218), the Lions passed the previous highest score in VFL history, which was set when Footscray kicked 33.15 (213) against St Kilda in round 13, 1978. By full-time, Fitzroy had kicked 22.8 (140) in the second half, and registered more than 400 disposals, 140 more than Melbourne.

Bob Beecroft kicked ten goals while Garry Wilson gathered 42 possessions for Fitzroy. Graeme Gaunt and Laurie Flower were among Melbourne's best players.

=== Scoreboard ===
Round 17, 1979
Saturday, 28 July (2:10 pm)	Fitzroy	def.	Melbourne	Waverley Park, Mulgrave, Victoria (crowd: 12,149)
7.7 (49); 14.14 (98); 26.17 (173); 36.22 (238)	Q1; Q2; Q3; Final	2.1 (13); 2.5 (17); 4.8 (32); 6.12 (48)
10: Beecroft; 5: Irwin; 4: Conlan, Quinlan; 3: Allan, Walls, Wilson; 2: McMahon; 1: Merrigan, Richardson	Goals	2: Gaunt; 1: Biffin, Durnan, Healy, Thorne

=== Records ===
The following records were broken:

- Greatest winning margin in VFL/AFL history (190 points)
- Fitzroy's highest ever score in VFL/AFL history (36.22 (238))
- Highest score conceded in Melbourne's history

== Aftermath ==
Fitzroy ultimately qualified for the finals for the first time since 1960, finishing fourth on the ladder and defeating Essendon in an elimination final before losing to the eventual runners-up Collingwood in the first semi-final.

The record for the highest score in VFL/AFL history was later broken when Geelong kicked 37.17 (239) against the Brisbane Bears at Carrara Stadium in round 7, 1992. As of 2026, Geelong's score still holds the record.

Melbourne responded after its record-breaking defeat, defeating then-fifth placed Essendon by 29 points the following week, 21.8 (134) to 16.9 (105). In the lead-up to that match, captain-coach Carl Ditterich admitted to warming the seat for Ron Barassi to return to the club as its head coach, though also confided that his players would bounce back:

"Really I think they will be in the right frame of mind because of the humiliation. You can cajole them, rant and rave, whatever you want but it is up to each one of them to realise the position the club is in, and accordingly to lift."
