= Apse from the Cathedral of Urgell =

Apse painting

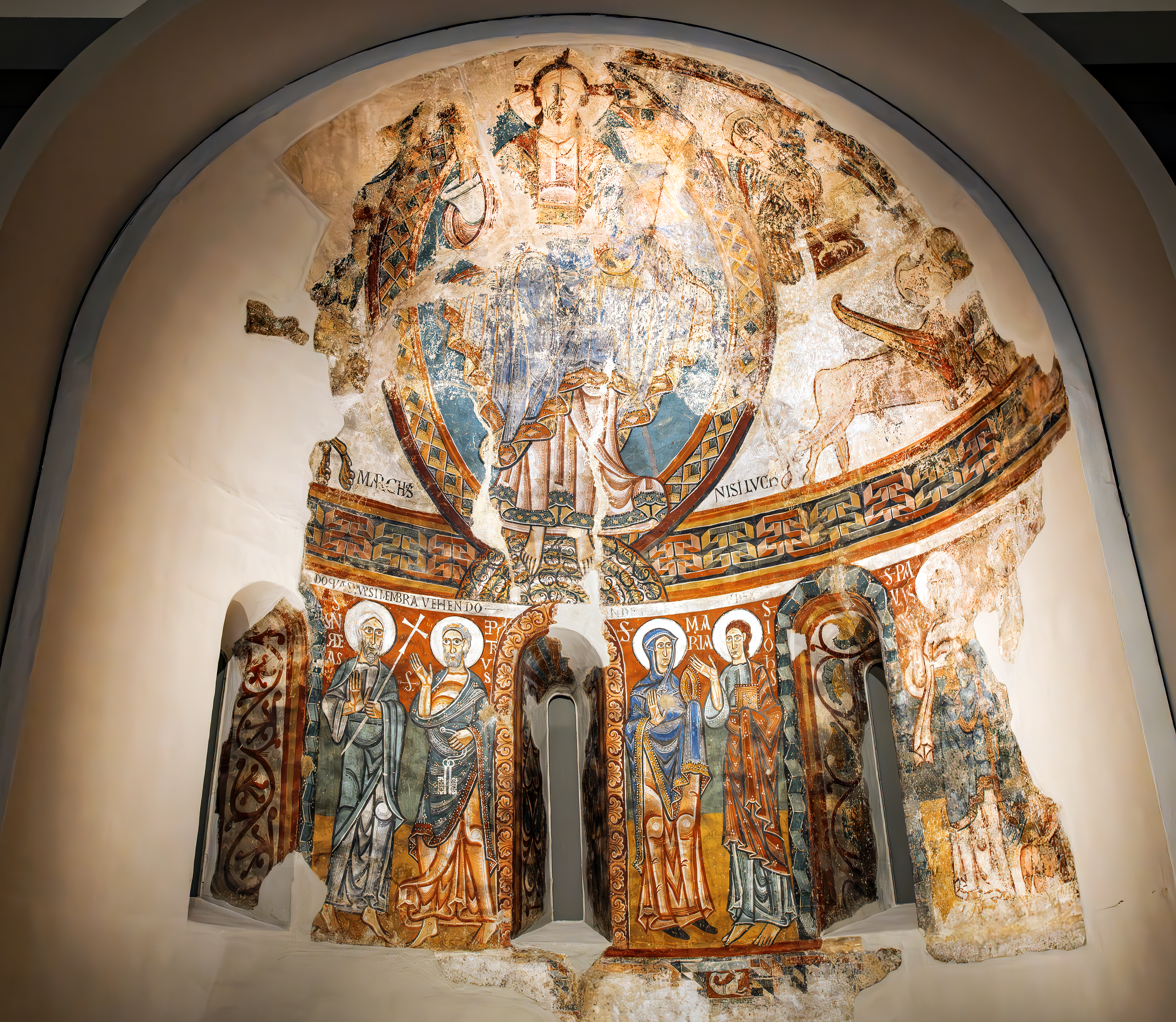
- Artist: Unknown
- Year: First half of the 12th century
- Location: Museu Nacional d'Art de Catalunya, Barcelona

The Apse from La Seu d'Urgell is an apse exhibited at the National Art Museum of Catalonia in Barcelona.

== Description ==
The decoration on this apse is a noteworthy sample from the MNAC's unique collection of Romanesque mural painting, most of which comes from the diocese of Urgell.

In the apse there was a large representation of the Theophany, or manifestation of the Lord, inspired in the Gospel and the Book of Revelation. Christ appears in all his splendour, upright and imposing in the mandorla of his glory, with the Earth as his footstool, in keeping with the Biblical interpretation. He was surrounded by the Tetramorph, or symbols of the Four Evangelists, of which John's eagle and Luke's bull are preserved almost whole.

The vision evoked in this image is both the Ascension of Christ and his triumphant return at the end of time. An attractive Greek fret in the classical tradition separates this register from the one below, in which are the Apostles, gathered around the figures of Saint Peter with the keys, and the Blessed Virgin Mary holding a crown - a curious iconographic detail referring to the Kingdom of Heaven.

Also portrayed are Saint Andrew with his cross, a beardless Saint John the Evangelist and Saint Paul, the Apostle to the Gentiles, who represent the Church militant attending to the manifestation of God. Attractive floral borders decorated the windows. Stylistically, these paintings show a synthesis of different influences from Lombardy, Occitania and Peitieu.

== See also ==
- Altar frontal from Tavèrnoles
