= Carl Ditterich =

Australian rules footballer, born 1945

Personal information
- Full name: Carl Robert Ditterich
- Born: 10 October 1945 (age 81)
- Original team: East Brighton
- Debut: Round 1, 20 April 1963, St Kilda vs. Melbourne, at Junction Oval
- Height: 194 cm (6 ft 4 in)
- Weight: 96 kg (212 lb)
- Position: Ruckman

Playing career^{1}
Years	Club	Games (Goals)
1963–1972	St Kilda	153 (123)
1973–1975	Melbourne	53 (35)
1976–1978	St Kilda	50 (33)
1979–1980	Melbourne	29 (8)
Total		285 (199)

Coaching career
Years	Club	Games (W–L–D)
1979–1980	Melbourne	43 (11–32–0)
- ^{1} Playing statistics correct to the end of 1980.

Career highlights
- Trevor Barker Medallist: 1968; Keith 'Bluey' Truscott Medallist: 1973; St Kilda captain: 1976–1977; Melbourne captain/coach: 1979–1980

Carl Robert Ditterich (born 10 October 1945) is a former Australian rules footballer who played for the St Kilda Football Club and Melbourne Football Club in the Victorian Football League (VFL). He also coached Melbourne for two years, as a playing coach.

Ditterich, known as the "Blonde Bombshell", made an impressive debut as a 17-year-old for St Kilda against Melbourne in the opening round of the 1963 VFL season, with his speed, high leaping and endurance noted.

He became a tough ruckman and often appeared at the VFL Tribunal, in particular missing St Kilda's only premiership victory in 1966 through suspension.

In 1973, he transferred to Melbourne under the VFL's short-lived "10-year rule", which allowed players with ten years' service at one club to move to another club without a clearance, before returning to St Kilda in 1976, due to his six-year deal being too expensive for Melbourne to continue.

In 1979 he switched again to Melbourne to become their captain-coach for two years; during this period, the Demons suffered the worst defeat in VFL/AFL history, losing to Fitzroy by 190 points in Round 17, 1979.

== After football ==
Ditterich purchased a wheat farm near Swan Hill, Victoria. He coached nearby Woorinen (Mid Murray FL) for two seasons 1983 and 1984. Eighteen years later he coached Boort in the North Central Football League in 2002 and 2003.

Ditterich unsuccessfully stood as an independent candidate for the seat of Swan Hill in the 1999 Victorian state election.

In April 2024, Ditterich was charged with historical child sex offences. The charges were dropped in January 2025.

== Statistics ==
Legend
G	Goals	K	Kicks	D	Disposals	T	Tackles
B	Behinds	H	Handballs	M	Marks	H/O	Hit-outs

Season	Team	No.	Games	Totals								Averages (per game)							
Season	Team	No.	Games	G	B	K	H	D	M	T	H/O	G	B	K	H	D	M	T	H/O
1963	St Kilda	10	17	3	—N/a	—N/a	—N/a	—N/a	—N/a	—N/a	—N/a	0.2	—N/a	—N/a	—N/a	—N/a	—N/a	—N/a	—N/a
1964	St Kilda	10	17	5	—N/a	—N/a	—N/a	—N/a	—N/a	—N/a	—N/a	0.3	—N/a	—N/a	—N/a	—N/a	—N/a	—N/a	—N/a
1965	St Kilda	10	13	8	13	199	28	227	70	—N/a	—N/a	0.6	1.0	15.3	2.2	17.5	5.4	—N/a	—N/a
1966	St Kilda	10	12	9	13	167	36	203	41	—N/a	116	0.8	1.1	13.9	3.0	16.9	3.4	—N/a	10.5
1967	St Kilda	10	12	18	18	169	19	188	49	—N/a	185	1.5	1.5	14.1	1.6	15.7	4.1	—N/a	15.4
1968	St Kilda	10	20	5	9	317	71	388	123	—N/a	335	0.3	0.5	15.9	3.6	19.4	6.2	—N/a	16.8
1969	St Kilda	10	8	16	8	90	20	110	39	—N/a	59	2.0	1.0	11.3	2.5	13.8	4.9	—N/a	7.4
1970	St Kilda	10	16	14	13	202	56	258	94	—N/a	96	0.9	0.8	12.6	3.5	16.1	5.9	—N/a	6.0
1971	St Kilda	10	16	23	12	233	50	283	91	—N/a	137	1.4	0.8	14.6	3.1	17.7	5.7	—N/a	8.6
1972	St Kilda	10	22	22	14	317	101	418	127	—N/a	241	1.0	0.6	14.4	4.6	19.0	5.8	—N/a	12.0
1973	Melbourne	10	22	5	13	256	44	300	96	—N/a	298	0.2	0.6	11.6	2.0	13.6	4.4	—N/a	13.5
1974	Melbourne	10	19	12	9	214	78	292	79	—N/a	8	0.6	0.5	11.3	4.1	15.4	4.2	—N/a	8.0
1975	Melbourne	10	12	18	6	114	57	171	34	—N/a	18	1.5	0.6	10.4	5.2	15.5	3.1	—N/a	3.6
1976	St Kilda	10	18	11	3	154	72	226	51	—N/a	203	0.6	0.2	8.6	4.0	12.6	2.8	—N/a	11.3
1977	St Kilda	10	11	6	4	83	39	122	27	—N/a	99	0.5	0.4	7.5	3.5	11.1	2.5	—N/a	9.0
1978	St Kilda	10	21	16	13	172	80	252	60	—N/a	197	0.8	0.7	8.2	3.8	12.0	2.9	—N/a	10.4
1979	Melbourne	10	17	6	4	178	103	281	70	—N/a	175	0.4	0.2	10.5	6.1	16.5	4.1	—N/a	10.3
1980	Melbourne	10	12	2	6	76	76	152	28	—N/a	122	0.2	0.5	6.3	6.3	12.7	2.3	—N/a	10.2
Career			285	199	158	2941	930	3871	1079	—N/a	2289	0.7	0.6	11.8	3.7	15.5	4.3	—N/a	11.0
