= Keith MacLeod =

Australian rules footballer

Personal information
- Full name: Keith MacLeod
- Born: 6 January 1959 (age 67)
- Original team: Koroit / Grassmere
- Height: 188 cm (6 ft 2 in)
- Weight: 86 kg (190 lb)

Playing career^{1}
Years	Club	Games (Goals)
1979	Fitzroy	2 (0)
- ^{1} Playing statistics correct to the end of 1979.

Keith MacLeod (6 January 1959) is a former Australian rules footballer, who played for the Fitzroy Football Club in the Victorian Football League (VFL).

== Career ==
MacLeod was a tall utility, standing 188 cm (6.17 ft), he was tall enough to pinch-hit in the ruck and mobile enough to be a follower. His VFL career was confined to that single season before he departed the club and returned to Koroit.

MacLeod played two games for Fitzroy in the 1979 season.
