= Saltire =

Heraldic and vexillogical symbol in the form of a diagonal cross

A diagonal cross (decussate cross, saltire, St. Andrew's Cross)

A saltire, also called Saint Andrew's Cross or the crux decussata, is a heraldic symbol in the form of a diagonal cross. The word comes from the Middle French saultoir ‘stirrup loop, stile with crosspiece’, from Medieval Latin saltatorium.

From its use as field sign, the saltire came to be used in a number of flags, in the 16th century for Scotland and Burgundy, in the 18th century also as the ensign of the Russian Navy, and for Ireland. Notable 19th-century usage includes some of the flags of the Confederate States of America. It is also used in the flag of Jamaica and on seals, and as a heraldic charge in coats of arms.

The term saltirewise or in saltire refers to heraldic charges arranged as a diagonal cross. The shield may also be divided per saltire, i.e. diagonally.

A warning sign in the shape of a saltire is also used to indicate the point at which a railway line intersects a road at a level crossing.

== Heraldry and vexillology ==
The saltire is important both in heraldry, being found in many coats of arms, and in vexillology, being found as the dominant feature of multiple flags.

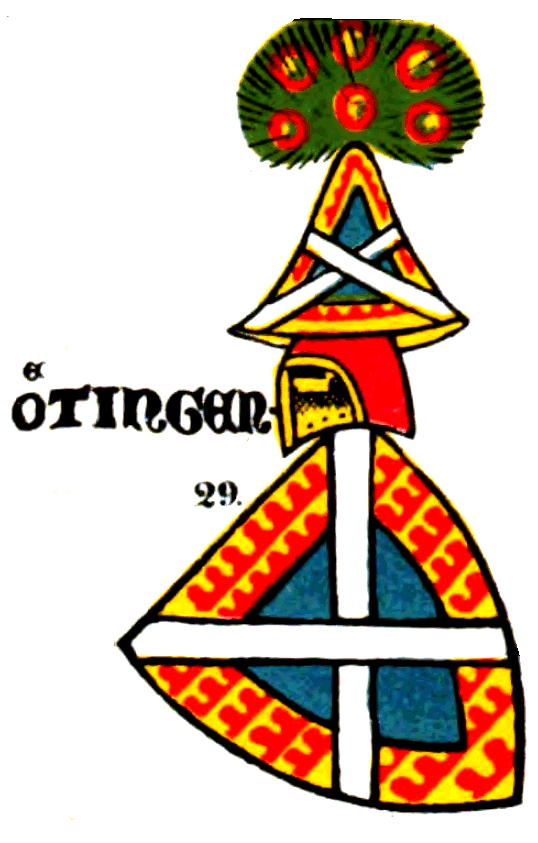
Coat of arms of the counts of Ötingen (Oettingen): Azure a bordure vair ancien gules and or, a saltire argent over all (attested from as early as 1180, here in the depiction in the Zürich armorial, c. 1340).

The saltire is one of the so-called ordinaries, geometric charges that span throughout (from edge to edge of) the shield. As suggested by the name saltire ("stirrup"; in French: sautoir, in German: Schragen), the ordinary in its early use was not intended as representing a Christian cross symbol. The association with Saint Andrew is a development of the 15th to 16th centuries. The Cross of Burgundy emblem originates in the 15th century, as a field sign, and as Saint Andrew's Cross of Scotland was used in flags or banners (but not in coats of arms) from the 16th century, and used as naval ensign during the Age of Sail.

When two or more saltires appear, they are usually blazoned as couped (cut off). For example, contrast the single saltire in the arms granted to G. M. W. Anderson (Note: Or on a saltire engrailed Azure two quill pens in saltire Argent enfiling a Loyalist military coronet Or)—with the three saltires couped in the coat of Kemble Greenwood. (Note: Sable a chevron Erminois cotised between three saltires couped Or)

Diminutive forms include the fillet saltire, (Note: The coat of the South African National Cultural and Open-air Museum: Or; an ogress charged with a fillet saltire surmounted by an eight spoked wheel or, and ensigned of a billet sable; a chief nowy gabled, Sable) usually considered half or less the width of the saltire, and the saltorel, a narrow or couped saltire.

A field (party) per saltire is divided into four areas by a saltire-shaped "cut". If two tinctures are specified, the first refers to the areas above (in chief) and below (in base) the crossing, and the second refers to the ones on either side (in the flanks). (Note: The coat of the Sandwell Metropolitan Borough Council: Per saltire Vert and Or four Fers de Moline counterchanged in fess point a Fountain.) Otherwise, each of the four divisions may be blazoned separately.

The phrase in saltire or saltirewise is used in two ways:

1. Two long narrow charges "in saltire" are placed to cross each other diagonally. Common forms include the crossed keys found in the arms of many entities associated with Saint Peter and paired arrows. (Note: Suffolk County Council's Gules a Base barry wavy enarched Argent and Azure issuant therefrom a Sunburst in chief two Ancient Crowns enfiled by a pair of Arrows in saltire points downwards all Or)
2. When five or more compact charges are "in saltire", they are arranged with one in the center and the others along the arms of an invisible saltire. (Note: Winchester City Council: Gules five castles triple towered, in saltire, argent, masoned proper the portcullis of each part-raised, or, and on either side of the castle in fess point a lion passant guardant that to the dexter contourny Or) (Note: The arms of the Episcopal Church in the United States of America: Argent; a quarter azure charged with nine cross crosslets in saltire argent, overall a cross gules)

Division of the field per saltire was notably used by the Aragonese kings of Sicily beginning in the 14th century (Frederick the Simple), showing the pales of Aragon and the "Hohenstaufen" eagle (argent an eagle sable).

=== Scotland ===
Flag of Scotland

The Flag of Scotland, called The Saltire or Saint Andrew's Cross, is a blue field with a white saltire. According to tradition, it represents Saint Andrew, who is supposed to have been crucified on a cross of that form (called a crux decussata) at Patras, Greece.

Saint Andrew's Cross was worn as a badge on hats in Scotland, on the day of the feast of Saint Andrew.^{[1]}

In the politics of Scotland, both the Scottish National Party and Scottish Conservative Party use stylised saltires as their party logos, deriving from the flag of Scotland. Furthermore, the Scottish Government uses the flag as its official symbol on Scottish Government publications, including letters, documents and press releases.

Prior to the Union, the Royal Scots Navy used a red ensign incorporating St Andrew's Cross; this ensign is now sometimes flown as part of an unofficial civil ensign in Scottish waters. With its colours exchanged (and a lighter blue), the same design forms part of the arms and flag of Nova Scotia (whose name means "New Scotland").

=== Cross of Burgundy ===
Cross of Burgundy

The Cross of Burgundy, a form of Saint Andrew's Cross, is used in numerous flags across Europe and the Americas. It was first used in the 15th century as an emblem by the Valois Dukes of Burgundy. The Duchy of Burgundy, forming a large part of eastern France and the Low Countries, was inherited by the House of Habsburg on the extinction of the Valois ducal line. The emblem was therefore assumed by the monarchs of Spain as a consequence of the Habsburgs bringing together, in the early 16th century, their Burgundian inheritance with the other extensive possessions they inherited throughout Europe and the Americas, including the crowns of Castile and Aragon. As a result, the Cross of Burgundy has appeared in a wide variety of flags connected with territories formerly part of the Burgundian or Habsburg inheritance. Examples of such diversity include the Spanish naval ensign (1506-1701), the flag of Carlism (a nineteenth century Spanish conservative movement), the flag of the Dutch municipality of Eijsden, the flag of Chuquisaca in Bolivia and the flags of Florida and Alabama in the United States.

=== Gascony ===
Flag of Gascony Lo Sautèr ('the Saltire')

Gascony has not had any institutional unity since the 11th century, hence several flags are currently used in the territory. Legend says that this flag appeared in the time of Pope Clement III to gather the Gascons during the Third Crusade (12th century). That flag, sometimes called "Union Gascona" (Gascon Union), contains St Andrew's Cross, the patron saint of Bordeaux and the red color of English kingdom, which reigned over Gascony from 12th to mid-15th century.

In Tome 14 of the La Grande Encyclopédie, published in France between 1886 and 1902 by Henri Lamirault, it says

during the hard times of the Hundred Years' War and the terrible struggles between the Armagnacs, representing the national party (white cross) and the Burgundians, allied to the English (red cross and red Saint Andrew's Cross), the flag of the victorious English ends up gathering, in 1422, under Henri VI, on its field the white and red crosses of France and England, the white and red Saint Andrew's Crosses of Guyenne and Burgundy.

That saltire is also represented in the pattern of some talenquères in many bullrings in Gascony.

=== Maritime flags ===
St Andrew's flag, used by the Russian Navy

The naval ensign of the Imperial Russian (1696–1917) and Russian navies (1991–present) is a blue saltire on a white field.

The international maritime signal flag for M is a white saltire on a blue background, and indicates a stopped vessel. A red saltire on a white background denotes the letter V and the message "I require assistance".

=== Others ===
The flags of the Colombian archipelago of San Andrés and Providencia and the Spanish island of Tenerife also use a white saltire on a blue field. The Brazilian cities of Rio de Janeiro and Fortaleza also use a blue saltire on a white field, with their coats-of-arms at the hub.

Saltires are also seen in several other flags, including the flags of Grenada, Jamaica, Alabama, Florida, Jersey, Logroño, Vitoria, Amsterdam, Breda, Katwijk, Potchefstroom, The Bierzo and Valdivia, as well as the former Indian princely states of Khairpur, Rajkot and Jaora.

The design is also part of the Confederate Battle Flag and Naval Jack used during the American Civil War (see Flags of the Confederate States of America). Arthur L. Rogers, designer of the final version of the Confederate National flag, claimed that it was based on the saltire of Scotland. The saltire is used on modern-day Southern U.S. state flags to honour the former Confederacy.

== Christian symbol ==
Anne Roes (1937) identifies a design consisting of two crossing diagonal lines in a rectangle, sometimes with four dots or balls in the four quarters, as an emblem or vexillum (standard) of Persepolis during the 3rd to 2nd centuries BC. Roes also finds the design in Argive vase painting, and still earlier in button seals of the Iranian Chalcolithic. Roes also notes the occurrence of a very similar if not identical vexillum which repeatedly occurs in Gaulish coins of c. the 2nd to 1st century BC, in a recurring design where it is held by a charioteer in front of his human-headed horse. A large number of coins of this type (118 out of 152 items) forms part of the Les Sablons hoard of the 1st century BC, discovered in Le Mans between 1991 and 1997, associated with the Cenomani.

The same design is found on coins of Christian Roman emperors of the 4th to 5th centuries (Constantius II, Valentinian, Jovian, Gratianus, Valens, Arcadius, Constantine III, Jovinus, Theodosius I, Eugenius and Theodosius II). The letter Χ (Chi) was from an early time used as a symbol for Christ (unrelated to the Christian cross symbol, which at the time was given a T-shape). The vexillum on imperial coins from the 4th century was sometimes shown as the Labarum, surmounted by or displaying the Chi-Rho monogram rather than just the crux decussata. The emblem of the crux decussata in a rectangle, sometimes with four dots or balls, re-appears in coins the Byzantine Empire, in the 9th to 10th centuries. Roes suggested that early Christians endorsed its solar symbolism as appropriate to Christ.

Reconstruction of Saltire pattern labarum per A.Roes

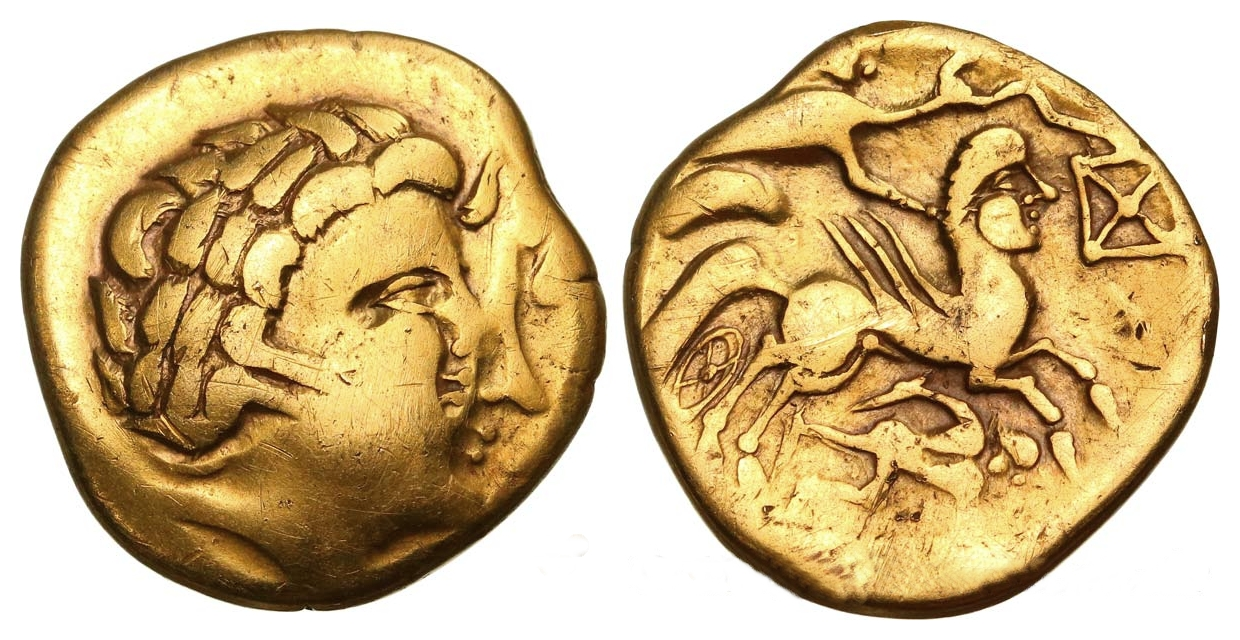
Gold stater of the Cenomani, on the reverse an androcephalous horse led by a charioteer extending a vexillum in front of it, riding over a fallen enemy.

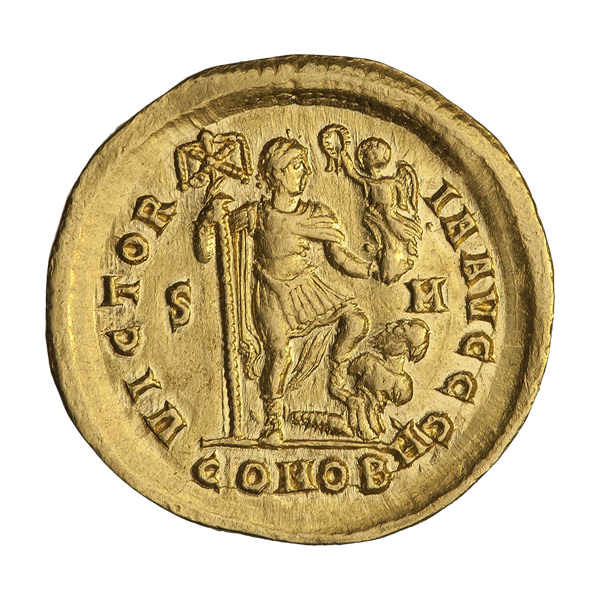
Coin of Theodosius I (393–395), with a vexillum displaying a crux decussata

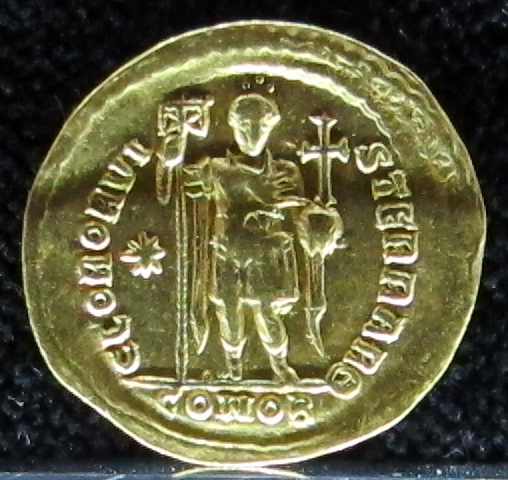
Coin of Theodosius II (425–429), showing the emperor with globus cruciger and with the same vexillum

The association with Saint Andrew develops in the late medieval period. The tradition according to which this saint was crucified on a decussate cross is not found in early hagiography. Depictions of Saint Andrew being crucified in this manner first appear in the 10th century, but do not become standard before the 17th century. Reference to the saltire as "St Andrew's Cross" is made by the Parliament of Scotland (where Andrew had been adopted as patron saint) in 1385, in a decree to the effect that every Scottish and French soldier (fighting against the English under Richard II) "shall have a sign before and behind, namely a white St. Andrew's Cross".

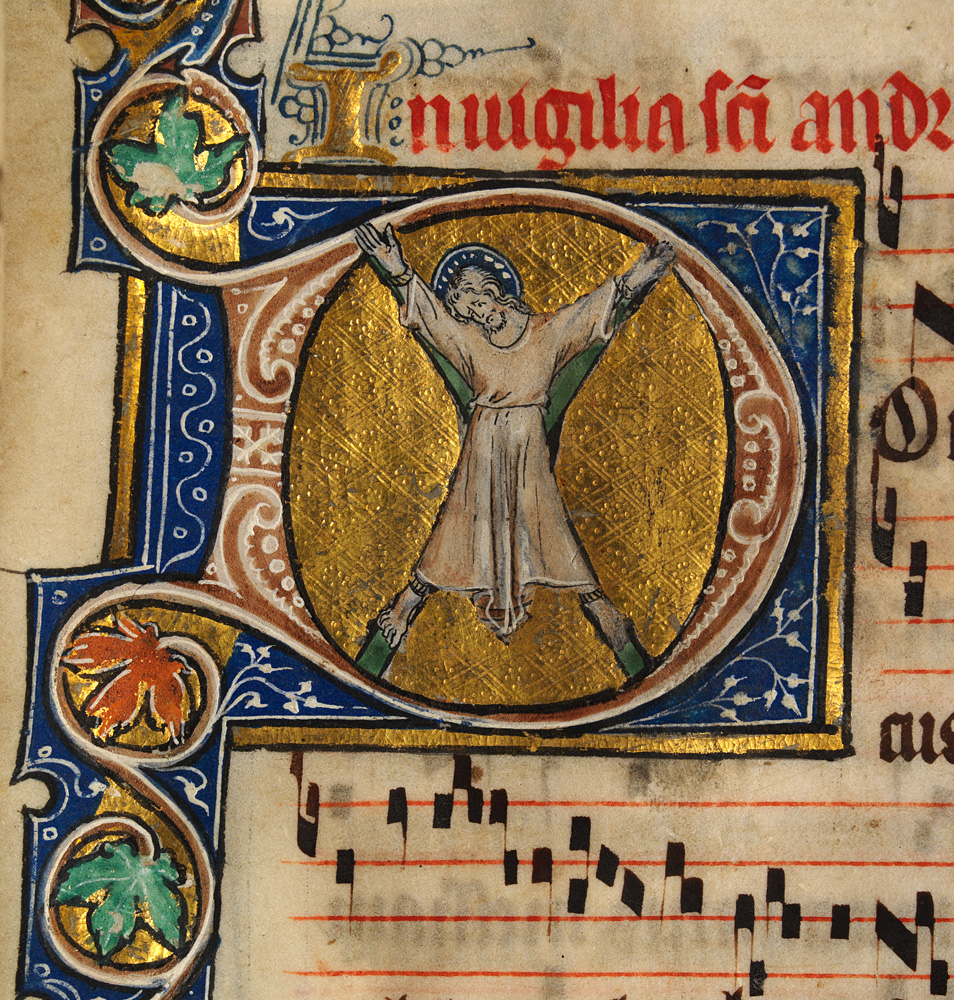
Saint Andrew martyred on a decussate cross (miniature from an East Anglian missal, c. 1320)

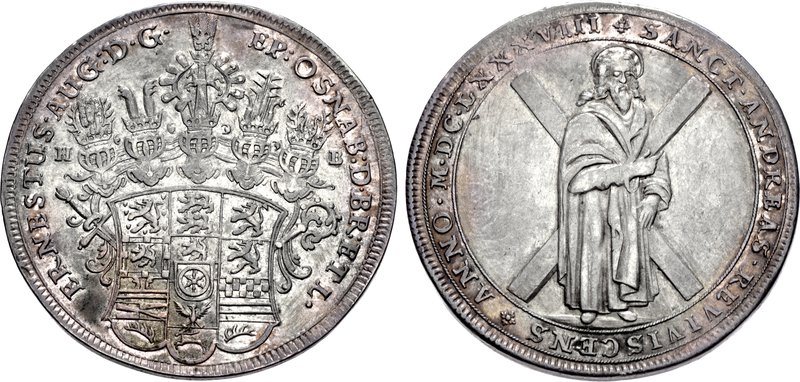
Saint Andrew holding his cross on a Taler of Ernest Augustus, Elector of Brunswick-Lüneburg (1688)

The cross continues to be used in modern times by religious groups. The arms of the Episcopal Church in the United States features a saltire in its canton. The logo of the Christian Church (Disciples of Christ) features a red chalice with a Saint Andrew's cross, representing the Scottish heritage of the denomination.

== Other ==
Chemical hazard

The diagonal cross (decussate cross) or X mark is called "saltire" in heraldic and vexillological contexts.

A black diagonal cross was used in an old European Union standard as the hazard symbol for irritants (Xi) or harmful chemicals (Xn). It indicated a hazard less severe than skull and crossbones, used for poisons, or the corrosive sign.

The Maria Theresa thaler has a Roman numeral ten to symbolize the 1750 debasement of the coinage, from 9 to 10 thalers to the Vienna mark (a weight of silver).

A diagonal cross known as "crossbuck" is used as the conventional road sign used to indicate the point at which a railway line intersects a road at a level crossing. A white diagonal cross on a blue background (or black on yellow for temporary signs) is displayed in UK railway signalling as a "cancelling indicator" for the Automatic Warning System (AWS), informing the driver that the received warning can be disregarded.

In Cameroon, a red "X" placed on illegally constructed buildings scheduled for demolition is occasionally referred to as "St Andrew's Cross". It is usually accompanied by the letters "A.D." ("à détruire"—French for "to be demolished") and a date or deadline. During a campaign of urban renewal by the Yaoundé Urban Council in Cameroon, the cross was popularly referred to as "Tsimi's Cross" after the Government Delegate to the council, Gilbert Tsimi Evouna.

In traditional timber framing a pair of crossing braces is sometimes called a saltire or a St. Andrew's Cross. Half-timbering, particularly in France and Germany, has patterns of framing members forming many different symbols known as ornamental bracing.

The saltire cross, X-cross, X-frame, or Saint Andrew's cross is a common piece of equipment in BDSM dungeons. It is erotic furniture that typically provides restraining points for ankles, wrists, and waist. When secured to an X-cross, the subject is restrained in a standing spreadeagle position.

Unicode encoded various decussate crosses under the name of saltire, they are U+2613 ☓ SALTIRE, U+1F7A8 🞨 THIN SALTIRE, U+1F7A9 🞩 LIGHT SALTIRE, U+1F7AA 🞪 MEDIUM SALTIRE, U+1F7AB 🞫 BOLD SALTIRE, U+1F7AC 🞬 HEAVY SALTIRE, U+1F7AD 🞭 VERY HEAVY SALTIRE and U+1F7AE 🞮 EXTREMELY HEAVY SALTIRE.

== Gallery ==
=== Coats of arms ===
Gules a saltire argent (Neville)

Azure a saltire or (Saint Alban's Cross, St Albans 1634)

Argent a saltire azure (Katwijk)

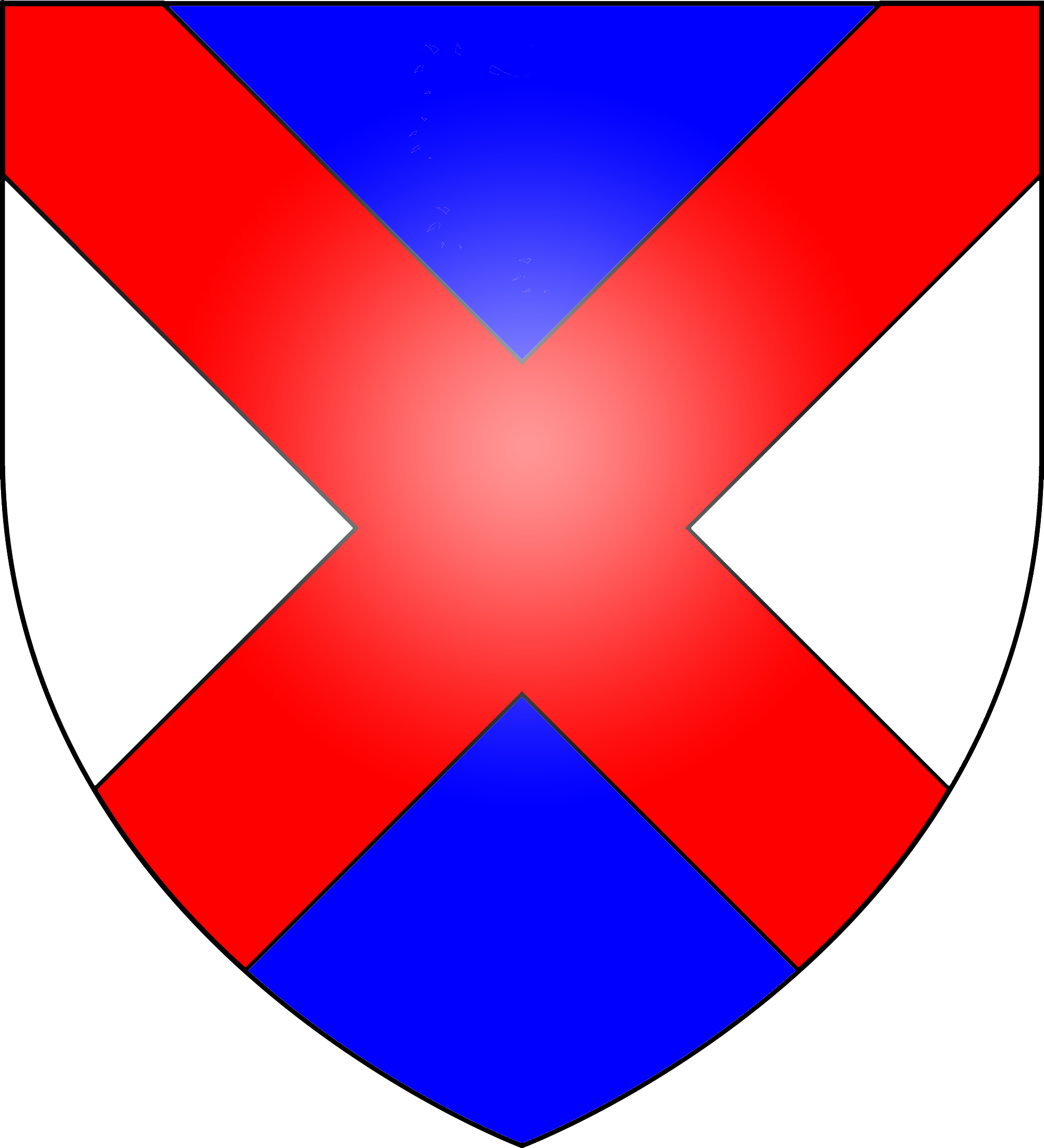
Per saltire azure and argent, a saltire gules (Gage of Hengrave)

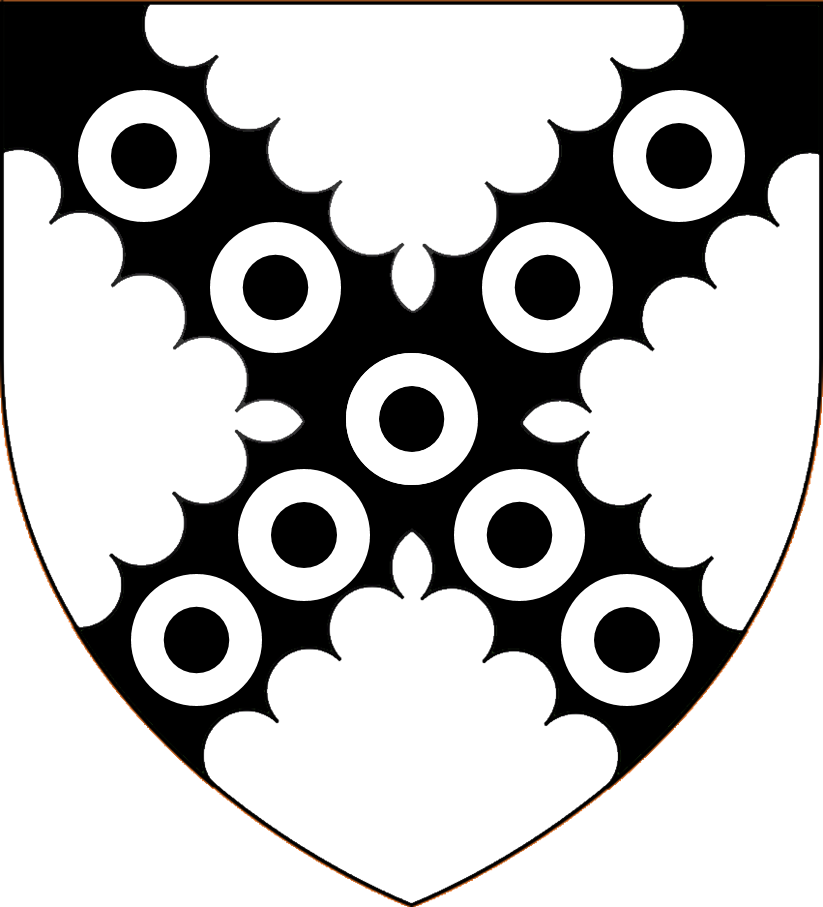
Argent on a saltire engrailed sable nine annulets of the field (Earl of Scarsdale)

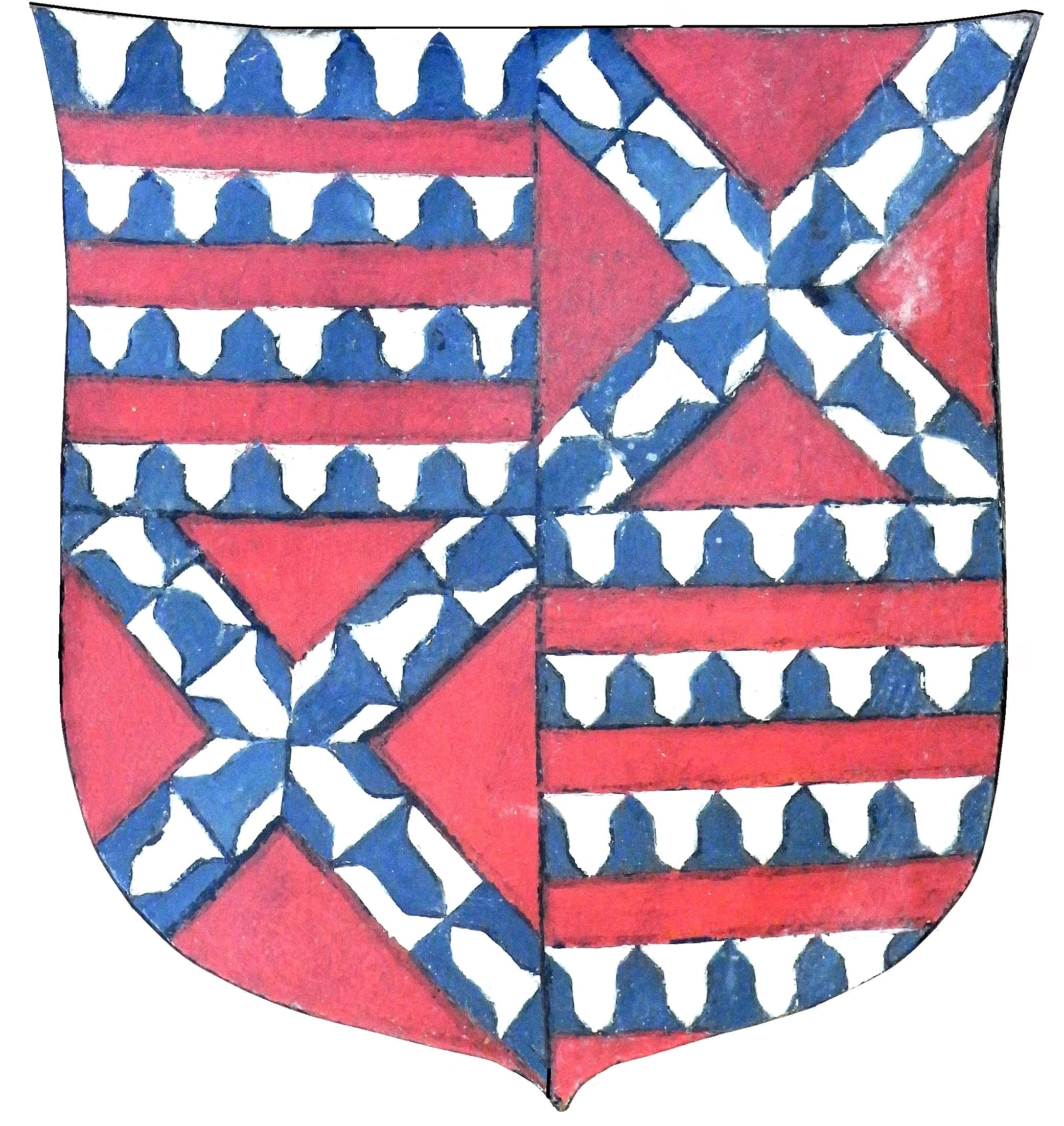
Quarterly 1st & 4th: Barry of six [seven] vair and gules; 2nd & 3rd: Gules, a saltire vair (Henry Beaumont of Devon, d.1591)

Argent a saltire floretty gules (Busséol)

Gules a fillet saltire couped argent above a wheel of the same (Klein-Winternheim)

Coat of arms of the San Andrés Archipelago

Hexham Coat of Arms (1953)

saltirewise

Gules two keys in saltire argent and or (Coats of arms of the Holy See and Vatican City)

Gules a cross saltire and orle of chains linked together or, in the fess point an emerald vert (Kingdom of Navarre)

Gules two keys argent saltirewise (Papal coat of arms for Pope Nicholas V, 1447)

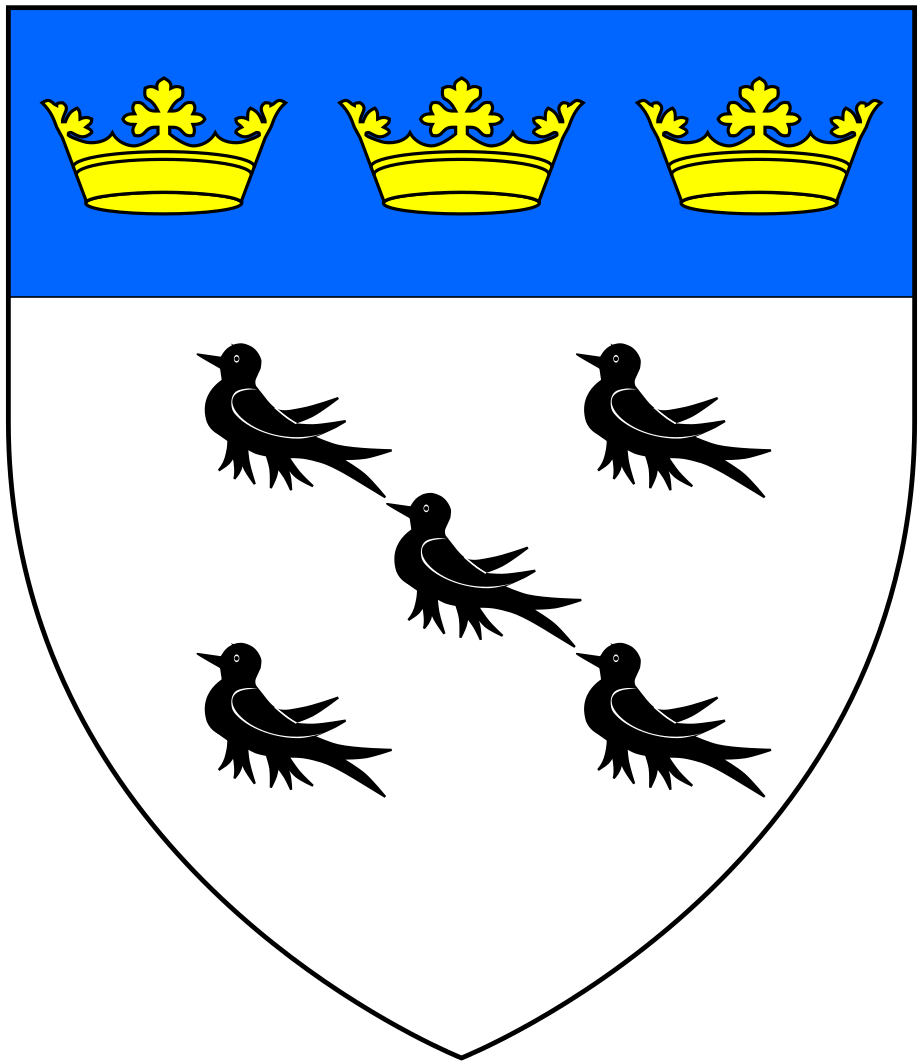
Argent five martlets saltirewise sable on a chief azure three ducal crowns or (Bodley)

Vert bordure or a caduceus argent and or and a cornucopia or with fruits and vegetables proper saltirewise (Coat of arms of Kharkiv, Ukraine)

Vert bordure or a torch and a caduceus or saltirewise (Federal Customs Service of Russia)

Argent two keys sable saltirewise under a cross pattée or (Lesser coat of arms of Riga, Latvia)

in supporters

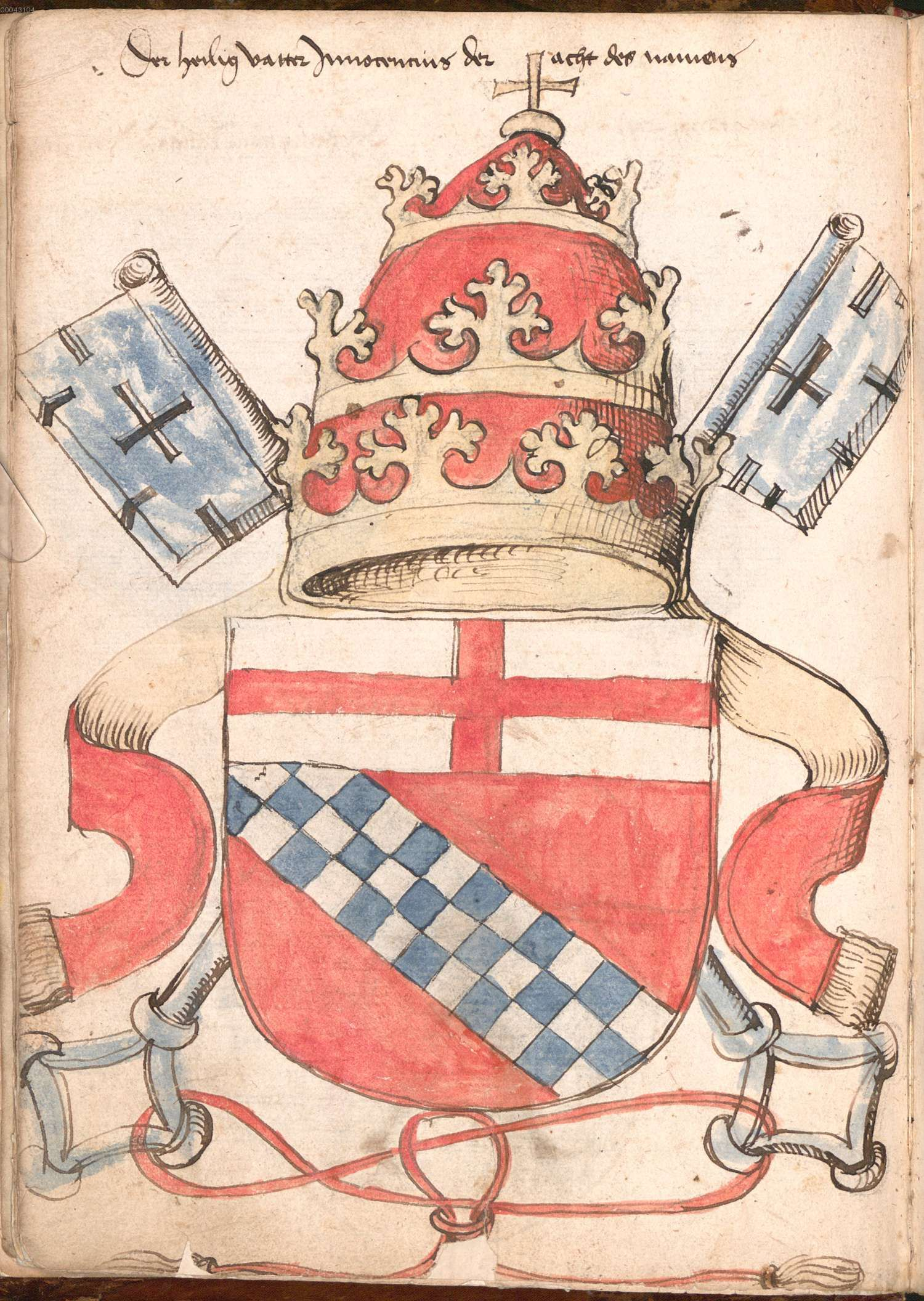
Papal coat of arms for Pope Innocent VIII with the Keys of Peter saltirewise (Wernigerode Armorial, c. 1490)

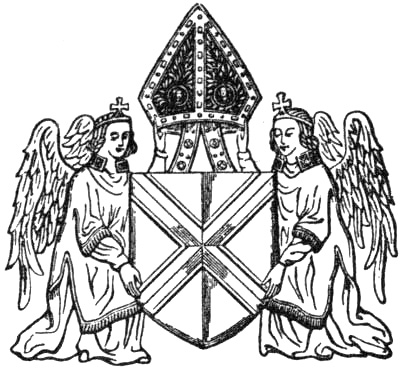
Coat of arms of the Abbey of St. Albans

Royal Coat of Arms of Spain (1700–1761)

Coat of arms of Spain (1874–1931)

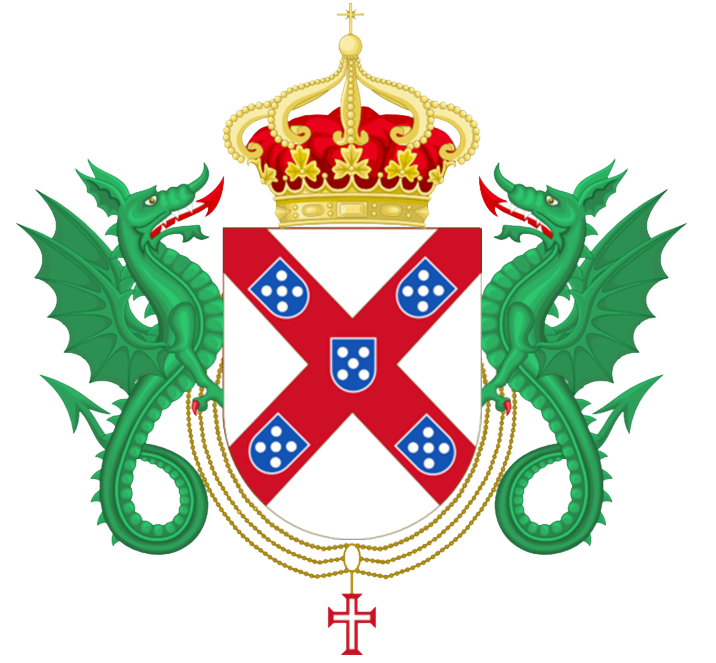
Coat of arms of the House of Braganza.

other

Coat of arms of Kaliningrad

Coat of arms of Barbados with Sugar Canes held saltirewise.

=== Flags ===
Vatican City's flag (Flag of Vatican City)

Saint Alban's flag (13th century)

Naval flag of the Kingdom of Sicily (after Guillem Soler c. 1380), inheriting the per saltire division from the royal coat of arms.

Flag of Scotland (c. 1507)

Flag of Gascony (15th century?)

Cross of Burgundy Flag, Duchy of Burgundy and Burgundian Netherlands (15th century)

Cross of Burgundy Flag, Spanish Empire (16th century)

Flag of Sucre (Chuquisaca), (currently Bolivia) (1540)

Flag of Valdivia, Chile (1552)

Tercio de la Liga (1571)

Saint Patrick's Flag (1783)

Union Jack (1606)

Union Jack in Scotland (1606)

Union Jack (1801)

Unknown Tercio flag (appears near commander Ambrogio Spinola in the painting "The Surrender of Breda" of Diego Velázquez) (1621)

Tercio de Alburquerque (1643)

Tercio Morados Viejos (1670)

Tercio Amarillos Viejos (1680)

Scottish Covenanter flag (17th century)

Flag of Argyll's Rising (1685)

St Andrew's flag of the Russian Navy and Imperial Russian Navy (1712)

Jack of the Russian Navy (1992)

Flag of Congress Poland (1815)

Flag of Nova Scotia (1858)

Confederate Army of Northern Virginia battle flag (1863–1865)

Confederate naval jack (1863–1865)

Flag of Shanghai Municipal Council, Shanghai International Settlement (1869 – c. 1917)

Flag of the League of the South

Flag of Shanghai Municipal Council, Shanghai International Settlement (c. 1917 – 1943)

Ensign of Chinese Customs (1867–1911)

Flag of the South African Republic ("Burgers Flag") (1874–1875), also flag of Potchefstroom.

Flag of Peru (1821–1825)

Flag of Rio de Janeiro (1908)

Flag of a Portuguese Minister (1911)

Flag of the Prime Minister of Portugal (1972)

Flag of the Empire of China (1915–1916)

White Army General Markov's Regiment flag (1917–1922)

Naval flag of the Far Eastern Republic (1921–1922)

Jack of the Estonian Navy (1926)

Flag of the Inspector-General of Customs (1929–1950) and the Ministry of Finance of the Republic of China (1950–2014)

Flag of Fortaleza (1958)

Flag of Jamaica (1962)

Flag of Katwijk (1970)

Banner of Kraków (2004)

Flag of Grenada (1974)

Flag of Amsterdam (1975)

Flag of the Basque Country (the Ikurrina) (1978)

Flag of Newfoundland and Labrador (1980)

Flag of Jersey (1981)

Flag of Burundi (1982)

Flag of Tenerife (1989)

Jack of the Bulgarian Navy (1991)

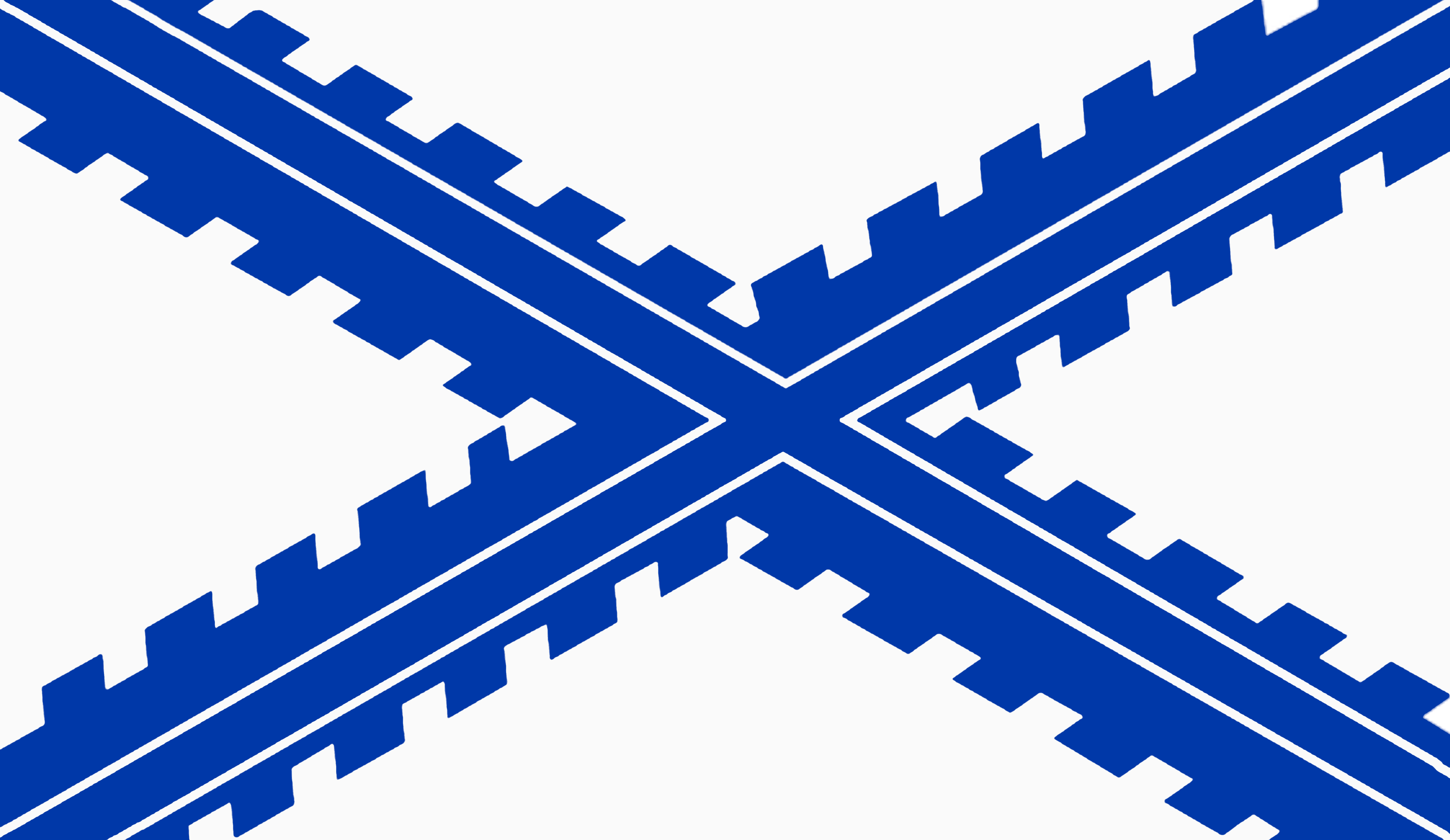
Flag of Truro, Nova Scotia (1993)

Flag of the Federal Customs Service of Russia (1994)

Ceremonial ensign of the Coast Guard of Georgia (1999)

Battle ensign of the Coast Guard of Georgia (2004)

Naval Ensign of Georgia (2004–2009)

Flag of the Russian Coast Guard (2008)

Flag of Arkhangelsk Oblast (2009)

Flag of Katwijk (2009)

Flag of Penrith (2012)

Flag of Ruhnu Parish, Estonia (2015)

Flag of Vladivostok (2016)

Flag of Sutherland (2018)

Auto racing disqualification flag

International Code of Signals

Mike

Victor

United States

Flag of Alabama (1895)

Flag of Florida (1868, 1900)

Flag of Georgia (1956–2001)

Flag of Mississippi (1894–2020)

=== Military insignia ===
Ensign of the Russian Navy

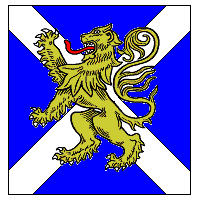
Tactical Recognition Flash of the Royal Regiment of Scotland

Spanish Air Force fin flash

Bulgarian Air Force roundel (1941–1944)

Bayonets in saltire create Roman numeral X for the US Army's 10th Mountain Division.

=== Orders ===
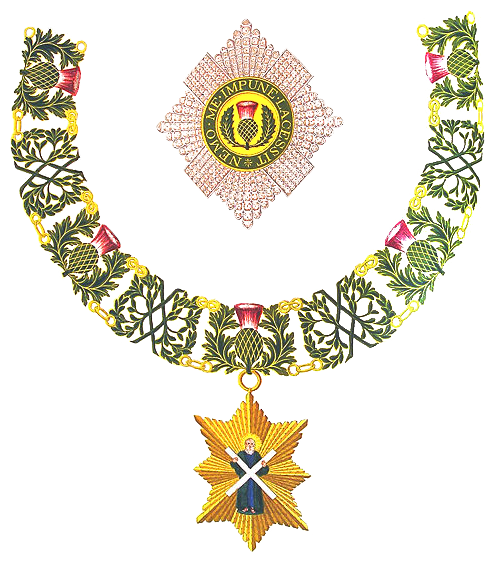
Order of the Thistle

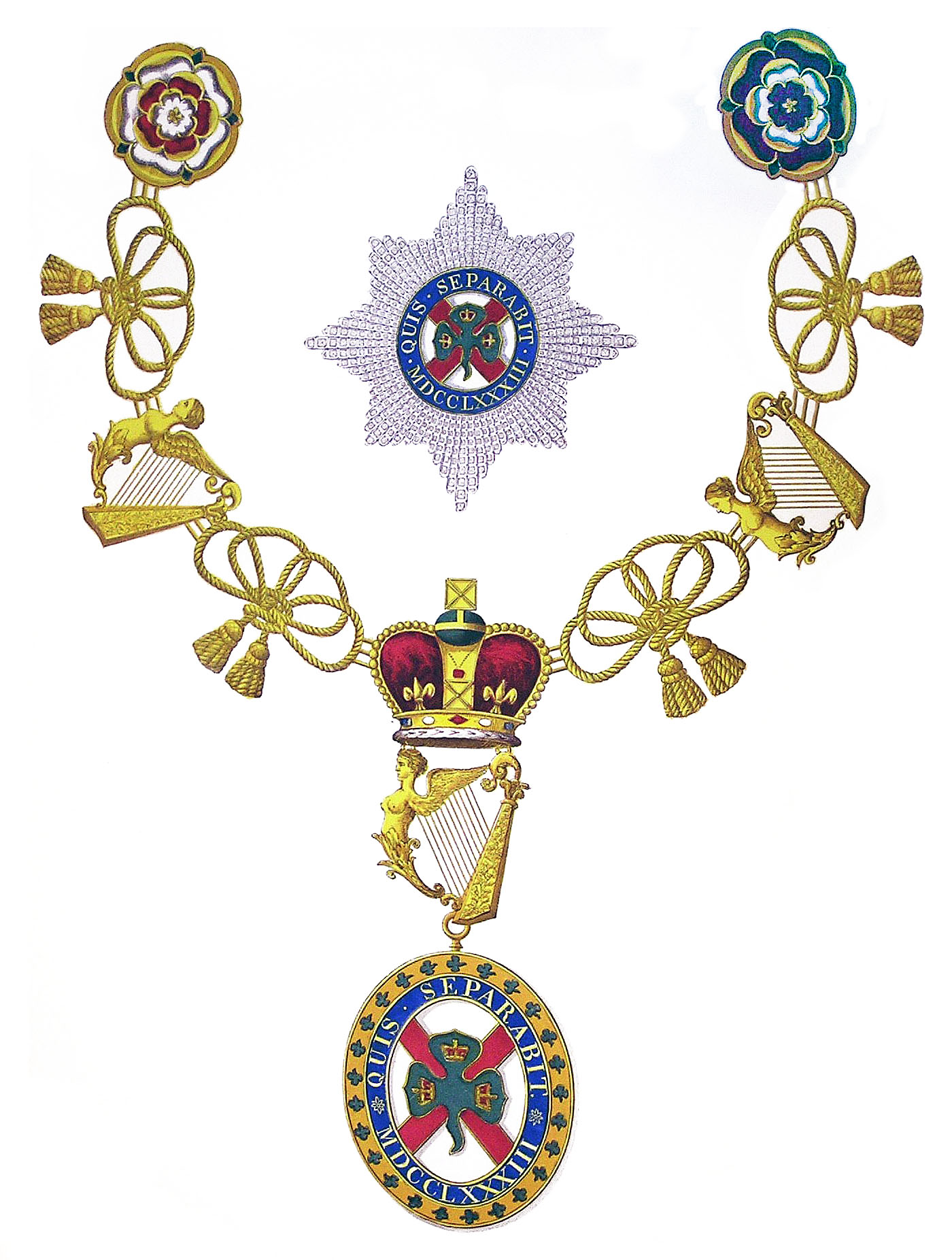
Order of St Patrick

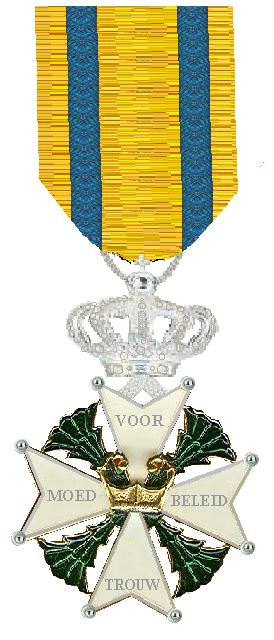
Military Order of William

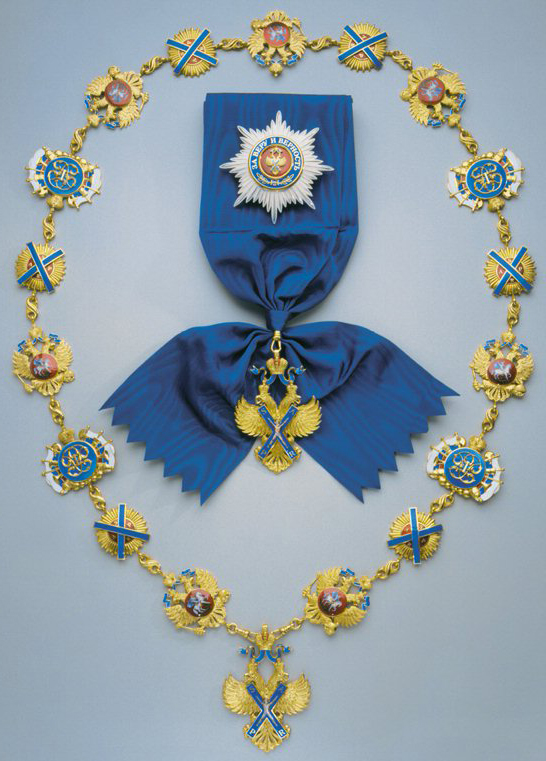
Order of St Andrew

== See also ==
- Christian cross
- Cross of Saint Peter
- Crossbuck
- Nordic cross
- Saint Andrew's Cross (disambiguation)
- Saint George's Cross
- Saint Patrick's Saltire
- X mark
