= Robert Elliott (Australian rules footballer) =

Australian rules footballer

Robert Elliot

Personal information
- Born: 29 April 1953 (age 73)
- Original team: Yea / Scotch College
- Height: 188 cm (6 ft 2 in)
- Weight: 81 kg (179 lb)

Playing career^{1}
Years	Club	Games (Goals)
1973–1978	St Kilda	60 (15)
1979–1981	Melbourne	43 (8)
Total		103 (23)
- ^{1} Playing statistics correct to the end of 1981.

Robert Elliott (born 29 April 1953) is a former Australian rules footballer who played with Melbourne and St Kilda in the Victorian Football League (VFL).

He is the younger brother of St Kilda Best and Fairest winner Glenn Elliott.

Elliott, in 1978, kicked a goal after the siren to give St Kilda a win over North Melbourne.
