= Todd Viney =

Australian rules footballer and executive

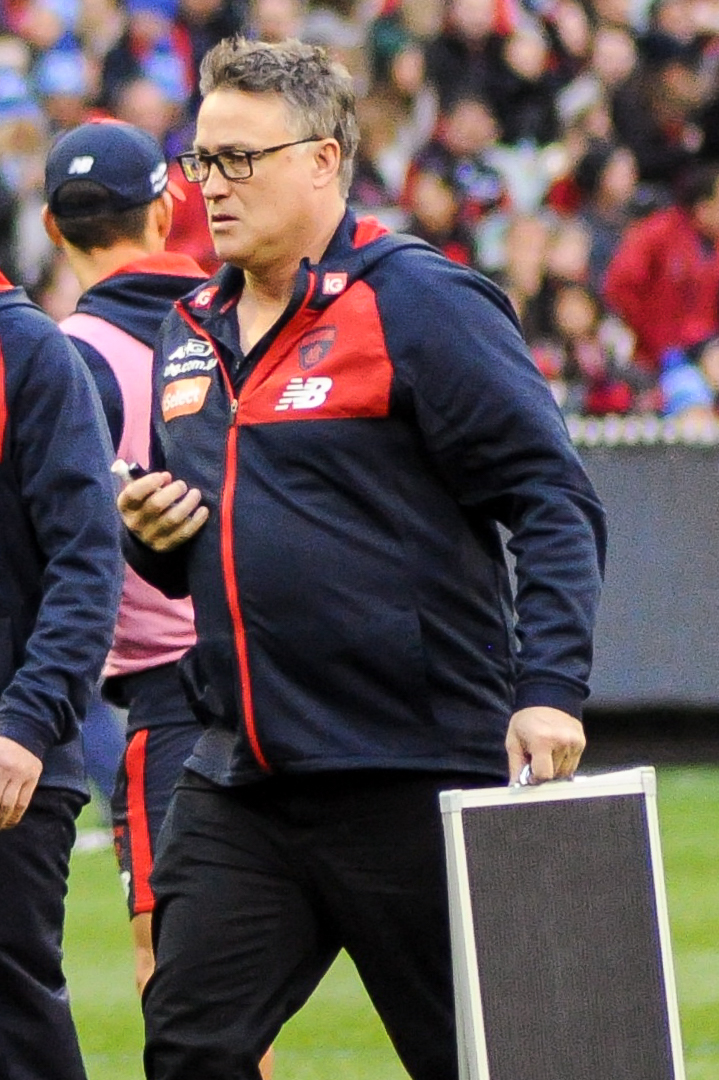
- Viney in June 2017

Personal information
- Full name: Todd Viney
- Born: 30 March 1966 (age 60)
- Original team: Sturt (SANFL)
- Height: 183 cm (6 ft 0 in)
- Weight: 92 kg (203 lb)
- Position: Midfielder

Playing career^{1}
Years	Club	Games (Goals)
1985–1986	Sturt	45 (30)
1987–1999	Melbourne	233 (92)
Total		278 (122)

Coaching career^{3}
Years	Club	Games (W–L–D)
2011	Melbourne	5 (1–4–0)
- ^{1} Playing statistics correct to the end of 1999.^{3} Coaching statistics correct as of 2011.

Career highlights
- Keith 'Bluey' Truscott Medallist: 1993, 1998; Melbourne Captain: 1998–1999; Melbourne Team of the Century -Interchange; Melbourne Hall of Fame; All-Australian: 1998

Todd Viney (born 30 March 1966) is an Australian rules football executive and former player and coach. He is currently the General Manager of Football of the North Melbourne Football Club. Viney played 13 seasons with Melbourne in the VFL/AFL, and he later served as their caretaker senior coach for the final five games of the 2011 season.

== Early life ==
As a youngster, Viney was a talented tennis player and held an Australian Institute of Sport scholarship from 1983 to 1984. In July 1984, he was ranked 735 on the ATP rankings. At 18, however, he decided to switch and pursue a footballing career.

== Playing career ==
=== Melbourne Football Club ===
A Sturt recruit, Viney was mostly a wingman and on-baller for Melbourne Football Club.

After nine seasons with the Demons, he decided to retire from football in order to become the fitness coach and hitting partner of the young tennis star Mark Philippoussis. However, Todd's standing with Mark's father/manager/coach Nick Philippoussis was very strained (as many people had warned him), and he soon resumed his football career with the Demons, midway through the 1996 season.

Viney captained the Demons in 1998 and 1999. In 1998, Viney earned All-Australian selection finished equal fifth in the 1998 Brownlow Medal. He also twice won the Keith 'Bluey' Truscott Trophy as Melbourne's best and fairest.

Viney announced his retirement before the end of the 1999 season due to nerve and hamstring related injuries. He is named in Melbourne’s Team of the Century, and is a member of the Club’s Hall of Fame.

Viney's brother Jay also played with Melbourne from 1988 to 1991.

== Coaching career ==
=== Melbourne Football Club ===
In 2000, he joined the Melbourne Football Club coaching panel as an assistant coach in the role of midfield coach under senior coach Neale Daniher. Viney was also part of the coaching panel in the club's 2000 Grand Final Loss. Viney didn't continue in the role for the 2001 season.

=== Moama Football Club ===
Viney then moved to Echuca coaching country club Moama in 2003 and 2004.

=== Hawthorn Football Club ===
Former teammate and Hawthorn Football Club senior coach Alastair Clarkson recruited Viney as an assistant coach at Hawthorn from 2005 to the end of 2008, including their 2008 premiership victory.

=== Adelaide Crows ===
Viney then moved to the Adelaide Crows as an assistant coach from 2009 to 2010. Viney resigned from his role as the assistant coach of Adelaide Crows at the conclusion of the 2010 season.

=== Return to Melbourne Football Club ===
In October 2010, Viney signed with Melbourne to be in charge of Melbourne's player development program. With Viney's move back to the Demons, Adelaide conceded Viney's talented son, Jack, to the Demons, under the father–son rule.

After Dean Bailey was sacked as senior coach in the middle of the 2011 season, the Melbourne Football Club announced that Viney would be caretaker senior coach for the remainder of the 2011 season. Melbourne under Viney, won one game and lost four games of the remaining five games left in the 2011 season, to finish in thirteenth place on the ladder. At the end of the 2011 season, Viney chose not to re-apply for the senior coaching job and was replaced by Mark Neeld as senior coach of Melbourne Football Club. Viney however remained with the club as the General Manager of Player Personnel.

Viney left the Melbourne Football Club at the end of the 2019 season.

== Sports Administration Career ==
=== North Melbourne Football Club ===
After three years away from the AFL, Viney was appointed General Manager of Football at North Melbourne on 25 August 2022, to work alongside newly hired senior coach Alistair Clarkson.

== Statistics ==
=== Playing statistics ===
Legend
G	Goals	K	Kicks	D	Disposals	T	Tackles
B	Behinds	H	Handballs	M	Marks

Season	Team	No.	Games	Totals							Averages (per game)							Votes
Season	Team	No.	Games	G	B	K	H	D	M	T	G	B	K	H	D	M	T	Votes
1987	Melbourne	12	16	9	11	180	79	259	58	44	0.6	0.7	11.3	4.9	16.2	3.6	2.8	3
1988	Melbourne	12	12	1	7	65	41	106	21	16	0.1	0.6	5.4	3.4	8.8	1.8	1.3	0
1989	Melbourne	12	9	6	4	90	49	139	39	11	0.7	0.4	10.0	5.4	15.4	4.3	1.2	0
1990	Melbourne	12	15	12	13	190	74	264	51	21	0.8	0.9	12.7	4.9	17.6	3.4	1.4	1
1991	Melbourne	12	24	13	15	412	182	594	103	36	0.5	0.6	17.2	7.6	24.8	4.3	1.5	7
1992	Melbourne	12	22	7	4	234	162	396	76	40	0.3	0.2	10.6	7.4	18.0	3.5	1.8	1
1993	Melbourne	12	20	6	5	238	228	466	67	38	0.3	0.3	11.9	11.4	23.3	3.4	1.9	2
1994	Melbourne	12	25	3	1	258	288	546	74	59	0.1	0.0	10.3	11.5	21.8	3.0	2.4	2
1995	Melbourne	12	17	4	4	179	175	354	56	35	0.2	0.2	10.5	10.3	20.8	3.3	2.1	3
1996	Melbourne	12	12	1	8	123	127	250	44	21	0.1	0.7	10.3	10.6	20.8	3.7	1.8	2
1997	Melbourne	12	22	7	2	261	235	496	61	60	0.3	0.1	11.9	10.7	22.5	2.8	2.7	9
1998	Melbourne	12	22	15	9	281	199	480	94	43	0.7	0.4	12.8	9.0	21.8	4.3	2.0	20
1999	Melbourne	12	17	8	12	176	110	286	52	26	0.5	0.7	10.4	6.5	16.8	3.1	1.5	5
Career			233	92	95	2687	1949	4636	796	450	0.4	0.4	11.5	8.4	19.9	3.4	1.9	55

=== Coaching statistics ===
Legend
W	Wins	L	Losses	D	Draws	W%	Winning percentage	LP	Ladder position	LT	League teams

Season	Team	Games	W	L	D	W %	LP	LT
2011*	Melbourne	5	1	4	0	20.0%	13	17
Career totals		5	1	4	0	20.0%		

* = Caretaker coach

== Honours and achievements ==
- Individual
  - Keith 'Bluey' Truscott Medal: 1993, 1998
  - Melbourne F.C. Captain: 1998-1999
  - All-Australian: 1998
  - Melbourne F.C. Team of the Century
  - AFL Rising Star Nominee: 1993 (Round 6)
  - Melbourne F.C. Coach: 2011 (Caretaker)
