= List of Melbourne Football Club coaches =

The following is a list of coaches who have been the official coach of the Melbourne Football Club, an Australian rules football club which plays in the Australian Football League (AFL), formerly the Victorian Football League (VFL).

== VFL/AFL ==
No.	Coach	C	W	L	D	W%	Years
1	Alex Hall	89	37	51	1	41.57	1907–09, 1912–13
2	Eddie Drohan	18	4	14	0	22.22	1910
3	Len Incigneri	18	2	16	0	11.11	1914
4	Jack McKenzie	17	9	8	0	52.94	1915
5	George Heinz	16	0	16	0	0.00	1919
6	Gerald Brosnan	16	5	11	0	31.25	1920
7	Percy Wilson	48	16	30	2	35.42	1921–23
8	Gordon Rattray	16	4	12	0	25.00	1924
9	Albert Chadwick	58	42	15	1	73.28	1925–27
10	Ivor Warne-Smith	92	48	42	2	53.26	1928–32
11	Frank 'Checker' Hughes	258	157	99	2	61.24	1933–41, 1945–48
12	Percy Beames	48	19	29	0	39.58	1942–44
13	Allan La Fontaine	56	25	31	0	44.64	1949–51
14	Norm Smith	310	197	108	5	64.35	1952–67
15	John Beckwith	62	17	45	0	27.42	1968–70
16	Ian Ridley	66	28	37	1	43.18	1971–73
17	Bob Skilton	88	28	60	0	31.82	1974–77
18	Dennis Jones	22	5	17	0	22.73	1978
19	Carl Ditterich	44	11	33	0	25.00	1979–80
20	Ron Barassi	111	34	77	0	30.63	1981–85
21	John Northey	167	90	76	1	54.19	1986–92
22	Neil Balme	98	41	57	0	41.84	1993–97
23	Greg Hutchison	13	3	10	0	23.08	1997
24	Neale Daniher	223	108	114	1	48.65	1998–2007
25	Mark Riley	9	3	6	0	33.33	2007
26	Dean Bailey	83	22	59	2	26.51	2008–2011
27	Todd Viney	5	1	4	0	20.00	2011
28	Mark Neeld	33	5	28	0	15.15	2012–2013
29	Neil Craig	11	1	10	0	9.09	2013
30	Paul Roos	66	21	45	0	31.18	2014–2016
31	Simon Goodwin	202	111	90	1	55.20	2017–2025
32	Troy Chaplin	3	0	3	0	00.0	2025
33	Steven King	11	7	4	0	63.64	2026–
Key: C = coached, W = won, L = lost, D = drew, W% = win percentage

- Statistics are correct as at the end of round 11 of the 2026 AFL home and away season.

== AFL Women's ==
Season(s)	Coach	Notes
2017–2025	Mick Stinear	2022 (S7) premiership coach
