= Peter Williams (Australian footballer, born 1957) =

Australian rules footballer

Personal information
- Full name: Peter J. Williams
- Born: 14 December 1957 (age 68)
- Original team: Waverley
- Height: 193 cm (6 ft 4 in)
- Weight: 96 kg (212 lb)

Playing career^{1}
Years	Club	Games (Goals)
1979	Richmond	7 (1)
- ^{1} Playing statistics correct to the end of 1979.

Peter Williams (born 14 December 1957) is a former Australian rules footballer who played with Richmond in the Victorian Football League (VFL).

Williams, a Waverley recruit, made seven appearances for Richmond, all in the 1979 VFL season. A ruck-rover, Williams debuted in round six, against North Melbourne. He next played in round 12, the first of six successive games.
