= Rheanne Lugg =

Australian rules footballer

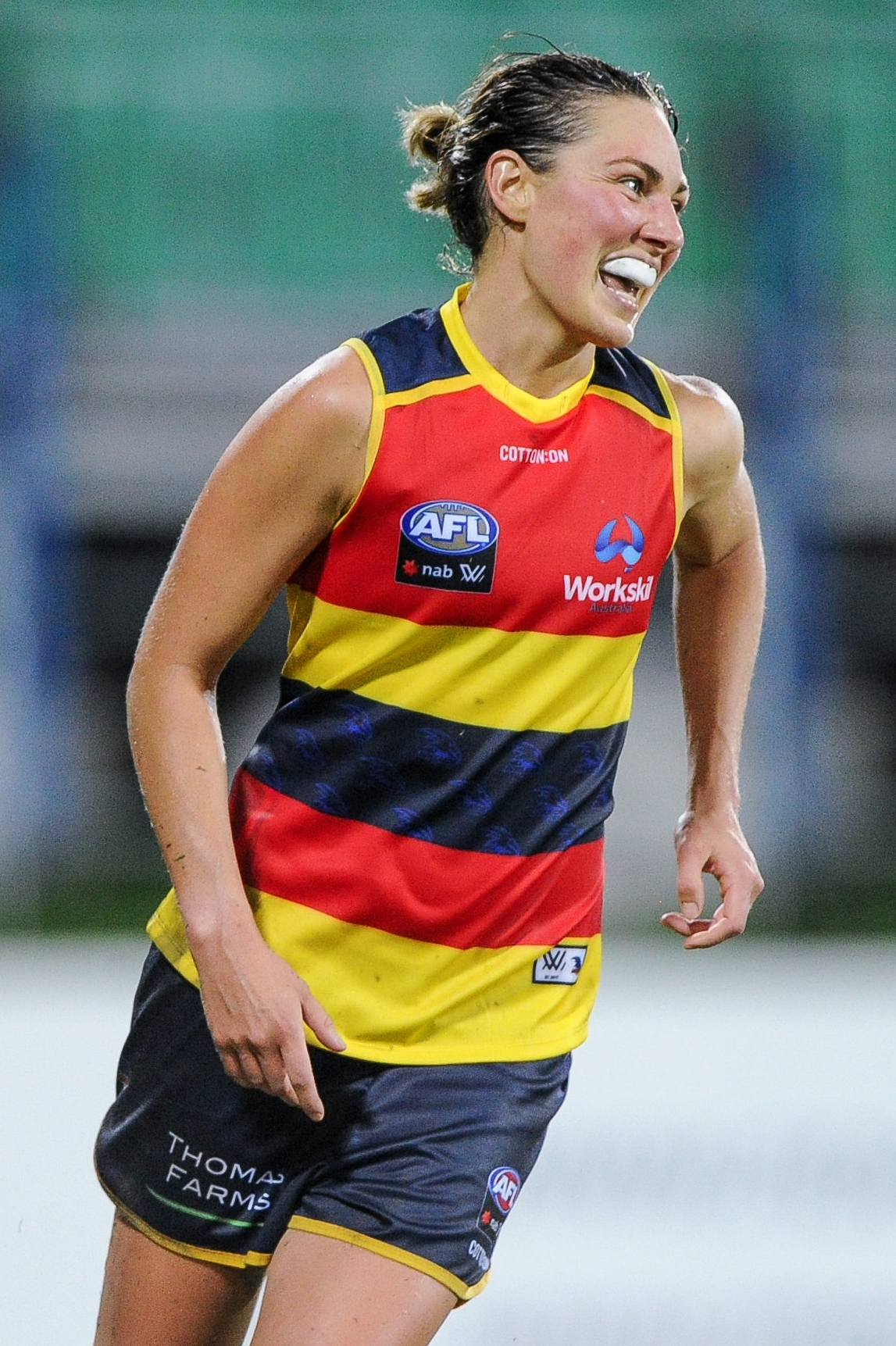
- Lugg playing for Adelaide in January 2018

Personal information
- Born: 22 February 1990 (age 36); Perth, Western Australia
- Original team: Riverina Lions (AFL Canberra)
- Draft: No. 42, 2017 AFL Women's draft
- Debut: Round 1, 2018, Adelaide vs. Brisbane, at Norwood Oval
- Height: 166 cm (5 ft 5 in)
- Position: Midfielder

Playing career
Years	Club	Games (Goals)
2018–2019	Adelaide	6 (0)
2020–2021	Brisbane	9 (3)
Total		15 (3)

Rheanne Lugg (born 22 February 1990) is a retired Australian rules footballer who played in the AFL Women's (AFLW) for Adelaide, from 2018 to 2019, and for Brisbane, from 2020 to 2021.

== State football ==
Lugg played with Swan Districts in the West Australian Women's Football League (WAWFL), alongside Chelsea Randall, and won a premiership with them. She played over 125 games for Swan Districts. In 2017, Lugg played for Riverina Lions in AFL Canberra. Lugg joined Wilston Grange, together with Brianna McFarlane, for the 2020 AFL Queensland Women's League (QAFLW) season. Lugg represented Western Australia four times, including the team who beat Victoria in 2015. Lugg has also played in the AFL Women's exhibition matches

== AFLW career ==
=== Adelaide ===
Lugg was drafted by Adelaide with their sixth selection and forty-second overall in the 2017 AFL Women's draft. The Australian Army let her transfer bases for six months so that she can work and play football simultaneously. She made her AFLW debut in the twelve point loss to Brisbane at Norwood Oval in the opening round of the 2018 season. In total, she played in six games over the season. After not playing a game the following year, she was delisted by Adelaide in April 2019.

=== Brisbane ===
Lugg signed as a free agent with Brisbane ahead of the 2020 season. In June 2021, Lugg retired from football.

== Personal life ==
Lugg is from Perth, where she completed a four-year electrical apprenticeship. Lugg's father, Gary, played for St Kilda before suffering an anterior cruciate ligament injury. Lugg is a qualified electrician, and worked in the field in the Australian Army, as an electrical technician, servicing, maintaining, and repairing electrical equipment.
