= Altar frontal from Tavèrnoles =

Romanesque painting

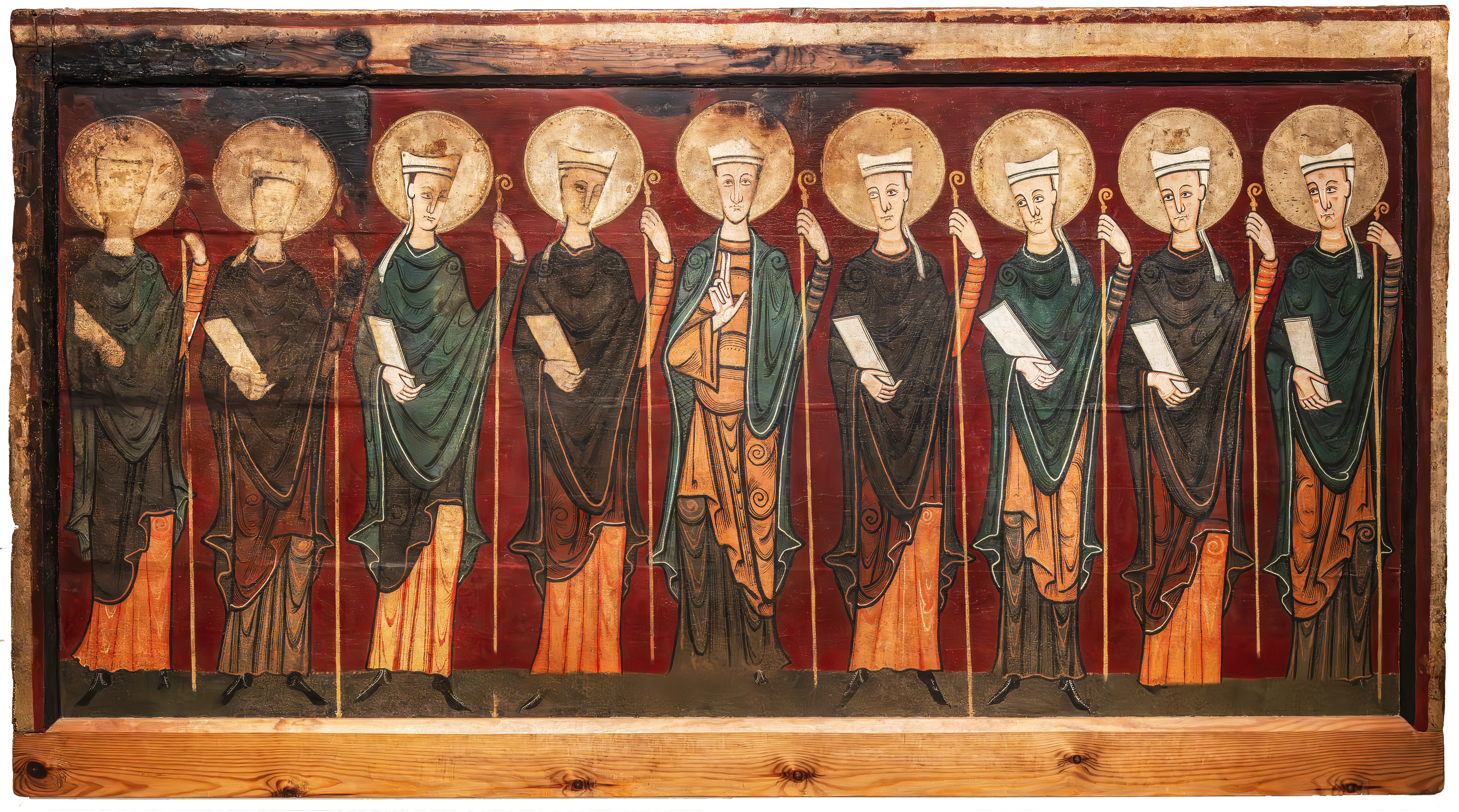
- Artist: Unknown
- Year: Second half of 12th century
- Medium: Tempera on wood
- Dimensions: 120 cm × 218 cm (47 in × 86 in)
- Location: Museu Nacional d'Art de Catalunya, Barcelona

The Altar frontal from Tavèrnoles is Romanesque altar frontal exhibited at the National Art Museum of Catalonia in Barcelona.

== Description ==
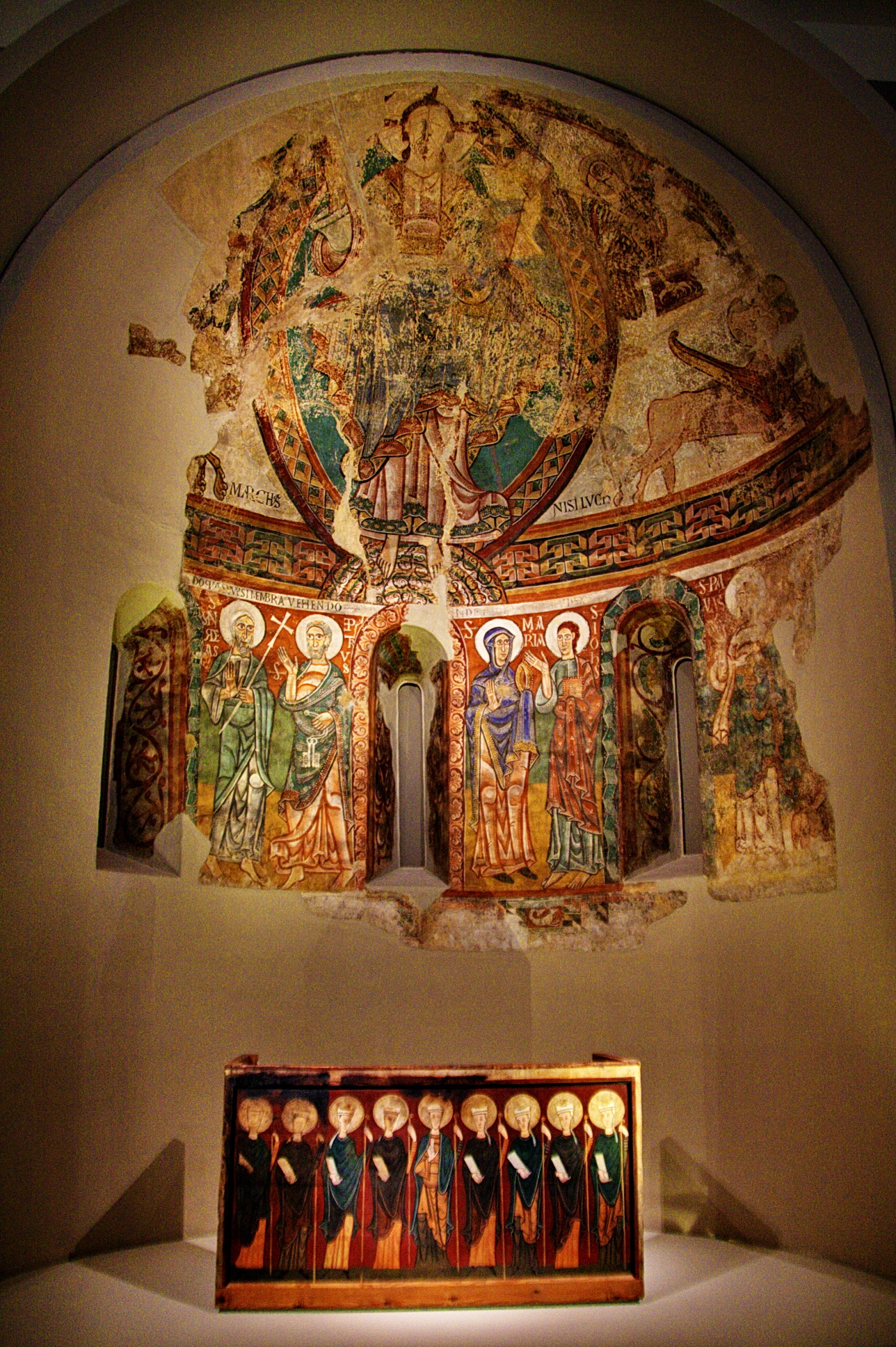
Exhibition of the frontal inside MNAC.

The altar from Sant Serni de Tavèrnoles stands out on account of its size, the composition and the subject depicted, a series of bishop saints.

The dimensions of this item are larger than is usual in known altar frontals. This suggested the possibility that it was a sarcophagus or an altarpiece, but the size and importance of the monastery it came from allowed large liturgical celebrations that would have required an altar of these proportions. The work depicts nine bishop saints, of which the central figure is possibly Saint Sernin the 3rd-century bishop martyred in Toulouse, who is the namesake and patron of the monastery the item comes from and .

This subject is very uncommon in panel painting, which used to concentrate the decoration around a central figure and arrange the scenes or figures in registers. On the sides, which were obviously painted by a different artist, are the bishops Martin and Bricius, identified by inscriptions.

The little we know about this altar has made stylistic analysis of the frontal our main source of information and there are various interpretations of it. The stylisation of the figures and the ornamental effect of the almost seriated rhythm of the personages have associated it with the resources used in mural painting, while such aspects as the precision of the line in defining the drapery have linked it to the decoration characteristic of miniaturists. However, the work could have belonged to a workshop connected with La Seu d'Urgell, for which reason it has been installed - inside de Museum - in the apse of La Seu d'Urgell.

== See also ==
- Apse from La Seu d'Urgell
