= Bob Beecroft =

Australian rules footballer (born 1952)

Personal information
- Full name: Robert James Beecroft
- Born: 11 January 1952 (age 74)
- Original team: Williams (UGSFL)
- Height: 191 cm (6 ft 3 in)
- Weight: 92 kg (203 lb)

Playing career
Years	Club	Games (Goals)
1970–1975	Swan Districts	126 (164)
1976–1980	Fitzroy	96 (291)
1981–1985	Woodville	79 (203)
Total		301 (658)

Representative team honours
Years	Team	Games (Goals)
1972–1979	Western Australia	8 (11)

Career highlights
- Swan Medal: (1972); All-Australian team: (1972); 4× Fitzroy leading goalkicker: (1977, 1978, 1979, 1980); Swan Districts Hall of Fame, inducted 2021; Swan Districts Team of the Century 1934-2000 (Interchange)

Robert James Beecroft (born 11 January 1952) is a former Australian rules footballer who played for the Fitzroy Football Club in the Victorian Football League (VFL), Swan Districts Football Club in the Western Australian National Football League (WANFL) and the Woodville Football Club in the South Australian National Football League (SANFL).

Beecroft made his debut with Swan Districts in 1970, playing 126 games as a ruckman, being named All Australian for his performance in the 1972 Perth Carnival and the Swan's Best and Fairest award. He played for Western Australia three years later and was recruited by Fitzroy for the following season.

As a key forward for the Lions, Beecroft topped their goalkicking list four times with a best of 87 goals in 1979 which was at the time a club record. He kicked 10 goals in a match twice, including in the record-breaking win over Melbourne in round 17, and by the end of his short VFL career he had managed 291 goals.

He returned to the SANFL with Woodville, where he played 79 premiership games, kicking 203 goals.

Beecroft finished his career at the Encounter Bay Football Club, where he coached the Bays to the 1989 premiership.
