= Ian Roberts (Australian footballer) =

Australian rules footballer

Personal information
- Born: 3 April 1957 (age 69)
- Original team: Frankston (VFA)
- Height: 180 cm (5 ft 11 in)
- Weight: 73 kg (161 lb)

Playing career^{1}
Years	Club	Games (Goals)
1979–1991	South Melbourne/Sydney	157 (33)
- ^{1} Playing statistics correct to the end of 1991.

Ian Roberts (born 3 April 1957) is a former Australian rules footballer in the Victorian Football League (VFL) for the Sydney Swans.

Roberts was a supporter of VFL club South Melbourne as a child, and was later recruited to South Melbourne from Victorian Football Association (VFA) club Frankston. He made his VFL debut with South Melbourne in 1979 and made his name as a back pocket player as they relocated from Melbourne to Sydney in 1982.

In a long career with the Swans spanning 13 seasons, Roberts played 157 games and kicked 33 goals, retiring at the end of 1991. He missed many games due to injury, as his light 73 kg frame and uncompromising playing style.
