= Doug Koop =

Australian rules footballer (born 1960)

Personal information
- Full name: Doug Koop
- Born: 22 July 1960 (age 66)
- Original team: Springvale (Federal League)
- Height: 180 cm (5 ft 11 in)
- Weight: 83 kg (13 st 1 lb)

Playing career^{1}
Years	Club	Games (Goals)
1979–1981	South Melbourne	15 (15)
1985–1986	North Melbourne	5 (4)
1987–1988	Melbourne	24 (5)
Total		44 (24)
- ^{1} Playing statistics correct to the end of 1988.

Doug Koop (born 22 July 1960) is a former Australian rules footballer who played with South Melbourne, North Melbourne and Melbourne in the Victorian Football League (VFL).

Recruited from Federal League and future VFA club Springvale, Koop, a utility, played 15 games in three seasons from 1979 at South Melbourne. He had perhaps his best match in 1980, against Carlton at Princes Park, when he had 22 disposals and kicked four goals.

He spent 1982 to 1984 in the SANFL playing with Woodville and then returned to the VFL at North Melbourne. Koop only made two appearances for North Melbourne in 1985 and three more in 1986 before switching to Melbourne.

It was at Melbourne that he got selected most regularly and despite playing in both of his club’s semi-final wins of 1987 and 1988, he missed each of the preliminary finals. Koop would remain at Melbourne in 1989, but did not play a senior game, and for 1990 he returned to his former club in the VFA.

Koop coached at the Cranbourne and Frankston YCW clubs, before joining the Officer Kangaroos in 2017. In mid-2022, Koop was sacked without warning prior to a midweek training session.
