= Gordon Polson =

Australian rules footballer (born 1959)

Personal information
- Full name: Gordon Polson
- Born: 27 March 1959 (age 67)
- Original team: North Ballarat (BFL)
- Height: 180 cm (5 ft 11 in)
- Weight: 76 kg (168 lb)

Playing career^{1}
Years	Club	Games (Goals)
1979–81	Footscray	5 (1)
- ^{1} Playing statistics correct to the end of 1981.

Gordon Polson (born 27 March 1959) is a former Australian rules footballer who played with Footscray in the Victorian Football League (VFL).
