= Mark Fraser (footballer, born 1959) =

Australian rules footballer

Personal information
- Full name: Mark Fraser
- Born: 30 September 1959 (age 67)
- Original team: Turvey Park
- Height: 180 cm (5 ft 11 in)
- Weight: 78 kg (172 lb)
- Position: Utility

Playing career^{1}
| Years | Club | Games (Goals) |
| 1979–81 | South Melbourne | 20 (1) |
- ^{1} Playing statistics correct to the end of 1981.

Mark Fraser (born 30 September 1959) is a former Australian rules footballer who played with South Melbourne in the Victorian Football League (VFL).
