= Shane Walsh (Australian footballer) =

Australian rules footballer

Personal information
- Full name: Shane Walsh
- Born: 4 April 1959 (age 67)
- Original team: North Footscray
- Height: 185 cm (6 ft 1 in)
- Weight: 80 kg (176 lb)

Playing career^{1}
Years	Club	Games (Goals)
1979	Footscray	2 (1)
- ^{1} Playing statistics correct to the end of 1979.

Shane Walsh (born 4 April 1959) is a former Australian rules footballer who played with Footscray in the Victorian Football League (VFL).
