= Glenn Elliott (footballer) =

Australian rules footballer

Personal information
- Born: 15 August 1950 (age 76)
- Original team: Yea

Playing career^{1}
Years	Club	Games (Goals)
1969–1977	St Kilda	138 (69)
1979	Melbourne	15 (11)
Total		153 (80)
- ^{1} Playing statistics correct to the end of 1979.

Career highlights
- St Kilda Best and Fairest 1974; Victorian state representative 4 times; Simpson Medal 1976 (VIC v WA in Perth)

Glenn J. Elliott (born 15 August 1950) is a former Australian rules footballer. He played for the St Kilda and Melbourne as a centreman.

He was a gifted player whose career peak was in the mid-1970s where he was rated the state's best in the centre. He took over the role of St Kilda's centreman from Ian Stewart after Stewart left the club. Representing Victoria, Elliott won the Simpson Medal in 1976 for best on ground against Western Australia in Perth.

After suffering a knee injury in 1977, he played a season for Melbourne in 1979. Later he moved to Port Adelaide and then coached West Torrens in the South Australian National Football League.

Following a stint as CEO of North Adelaide Football Club, Elliott became CEO of Adelaide United in 2011.
