= St. Andrew's Cross =

St. Andrew's Cross may refer to:

- Saltire, a heraldic symbol in the form of a diagonal cross
  - Flag of Scotland, the national flag of Scotland, a white saltire on a blue field
  - St. Andrew's cross (philately), a saltire that occurs on some philatelic items
  - Saint Andrew's Cross (BDSM), a common piece of equipment in BDSM dungeons
- St Andrew's Cross, Glasgow, a road junction in Glasgow, Scotland
- Hypericum hypericoides, or St. Andrew's cross, a species of flowering plant
- Argiope (spider), or St. Andrew's cross spider, a genus of spiders

== See also ==
- Andrew Cross (disambiguation)
