= Gary Lugg =

Australian rules footballer

Personal information
- Full name: Gary Lugg
- Born: 5 June 1958 (age 68)
- Original team: Golden Point
- Height: 175 cm (5 ft 9 in)
- Weight: 76 kg (168 lb)

Playing career^{1}
Years	Club	Games (Goals)
1979	St Kilda	1 (0)
- ^{1} Playing statistics correct to the end of 1979.

Gary Lugg (born 5 June 1958) is a former Australian rules footballer who played with St Kilda in the Victorian Football League (VFL).

Lugg's daughter, Rheanne, plays for Brisbane in the AFL Women's (AFLW).
