= Mick Warren =

Australian rules footballer

Personal information
- Full name: Mick Warren
- Born: 19 June 1959 (age 67)
- Original team: Watsonia
- Height: 185 cm (6 ft 1 in)
- Weight: 86 kg (190 lb)

Playing career^{1}
Years	Club	Games (Goals)
1979–80	Collingwood	3 (0)
- ^{1} Playing statistics correct to the end of 1980.

Mick Warren (born 19 June 1959) is a former Australian rules footballer who played with Collingwood in the Victorian Football League (VFL).
