= Robbie Peers =

Australian rules footballer

Personal information
- Full name: Robbie Peers
- Born: 14 May 1956 (age 70)
- Height: 182 cm (6 ft 0 in)
- Weight: 76 kg (168 lb)

Playing career^{1}
Years	Club	Games (Goals)
1979	Footscray	3 (0)
- ^{1} Playing statistics correct to the end of 1979.

Robbie Peers (born 14 May 1956) is a former Australian rules footballer who played with Footscray in the Victorian Football League (VFL).
