= John Dellamarta =

Australian rules footballer

Personal information
- Full name: John Dellamarta
- Born: 26 August 1954 (age 72)
- Original team: Trinity Grammar
- Height: 185 cm (6 ft 1 in)
- Weight: 84 kg (185 lb)

Playing career^{1}
Years	Club	Games (Goals)
1975–78	Collingwood	17 (3)
1979	Melbourne	2 (1)
Total		19 (4)
- ^{1} Playing statistics correct to the end of 1979.

John Dellamarta (born 26 August 1954) is a former Australian rules footballer who played with Collingwood and Melbourne in the Victorian Football League (VFL).
