= Jim Durnan =

Australian rules footballer

Personal information
- Full name: Jim Durnan
- Born: 18 April 1960 (age 66)
- Original team: St Kilda CBC
- Height: 187 cm (6 ft 2 in)
- Weight: 87 kg (192 lb)

Playing career^{1}
Years	Club	Games (Goals)
1979–81	Melbourne	26 (2)
- ^{1} Playing statistics correct to the end of 1981.

Jim Durnan (born 18 April 1960) is a former Australian rules footballer who played with Melbourne in the Victorian Football League (VFL). He later played for Prahran in the Victorian Football Association, winning a Division 2 premiership with the club in 1987 before retiring. He returned to coach the club in 1994, its final season in the VFA.
