= Andrew Cross (footballer) =

Australian rules footballer

Personal information
- Born: 13 April 1961 (age 65)
- Original team: St Kilda City
- Height: 178 cm (5 ft 10 in)
- Weight: 80 kg (176 lb)

Playing career^{1}
Years	Club	Games (Goals)
1979–1984	St Kilda	31 (31)
1985	Fitzroy	19 (12)
1986	Richmond	1 (0)
Total		51 (43)
- ^{1} Playing statistics correct to the end of 1986.

Andrew Cross (born 13 April 1961) is a former Australian rules footballer who played with St Kilda, Fitzroy and Richmond in the Victorian Football League (VFL).

Cross, a rover, was recruited locally and made his league debut in 1979. He appeared just twice in 1980 and then didn't play senior VFL football in either of the next two seasons. When he returned in 1983, he played the best football of his career, averaging 20 disposals and kicking 14 goals from his eight games. The following year he made more regular appearances, playing 15 games.

He finished his career with one seasons stints at both Fitzroy and Richmond. At Fitzroy, he missed just three games all year and then crossed to Richmond. Despite commanding a high transfer fee, he played just once for his new club.

Cross also played for Victorian Football Assoication (VFA) club Frankston under the coaching of Jeff Sarau.
