= Stephen Roach (footballer) =

Australian rules footballer and coach

Personal information
- Full name: Stephen Hartley Roach
- Born: 20 June 1958 (age 68); Melbourne, Victoria
- Original team: Jordanville
- Height: 183 cm (6 ft 0 in)
- Weight: 89 kg (196 lb)

Playing career^{1}
Years	Club	Games (Goals)
1978	Richmond	2 (0)
1979–1980	Collingwood	4 (0)
1981	St Kilda	2 (1)
Total		8 (1)
- ^{1} Playing statistics correct to the end of 1981.

Stephen Hartley Roach (Steve) (born 20 June 1958) is a former Australian rules footballer who played with Richmond, Collingwood and St Kilda in the Victorian Football League (VFL). He is also a musician and singer songwriter based in Melbourne Australia.

Roach, a utility from Jordanville, played two senior games for Richmond in 1978. He finished third in Gardiner Medal voting for his efforts in the reserves. The utility made his way to Collingwood in 1979 and with the club making the grand final in both of his two seasons and several serious injuries, Roach found it difficult to command regular selection and played only 4 senior games at the club. Stephen played 2 senior games at St Kilda in 1981, Roach then went to the Victorian Football Association, (VFA) and played at Oakleigh F.C. for 5 years and Box Hill for 1 year. Roach was captain and coach of the Oakleigh Football Club in 1985 and 1986. After an injury plagued career Roach retired from football at the end of 1987 and had a career in business and coached in suburban leagues.

In 2005 Roach pursued an interest in music and formed a band called "Steve Roach and Little Rain". Roach is a singer song writer whose music is categorised as Americana, Blues and Rock. He plays guitar and is lead singer in the band. In 2009 he was signed to Cinderella Records in Jacksonville Florida U.S.A. He released two albums which were distributed world wide by Cinderella Records and Musik and Film Distribution to critical acclaim but limited sales success. The first recording "The Revelation" was in 2010 with the first single being "Just a little Stumble", The second in 2013, "A Long Time Coming" received major airplay but limited sales. The singles were "Salvation" a bluesy gospel song and "Darkness" a upbeat rocker were well received by critics but limited sales. Roach commenced recording a third album just before Covid19 lockdowns in Australia and it is yet to be completed. The band started recording twelve tracks at Last Match recordings in Richmond Victoria. Four tracks finished production and were to make up an EP but the project still sits uncompleted.

Roach has also been involved in martial arts, particularly HEMA, Historical European Martial Arts, using European Longsword and Backsword.
