= 1979 VFL season =

83rd season of the Victorian Football League (VFL)

1979 VFL premiership season
- Teams: 12
- Premiers: Carlton; 12th premiership
- Minor premiers: Carlton; 14th minor premiership
- Night series: Collingwood; 1st Night series win
- Brownlow Medallist: Peter Moore (Collingwood)
- Coleman Medallist: Kelvin Templeton (Footscray)

Attendance
- Matches played: 138
- Total attendance: 3,574,281 (25,901 per match)
- Highest: 113,545

The 1979 VFL season was the 83rd season of the Victorian Football League (VFL), the highest level senior Australian rules football competition in Victoria. The season featured twelve clubs, ran from 31 March until 29 September, and comprised a 22-game home-and-away season followed by a finals series featuring the top five clubs.

The premiership was won by the Carlton Football Club for the twelfth time, after it defeated Collingwood by five points in the 1979 VFL Grand Final.

The season saw the beginning of the league's expansion into the interstate and Sunday television markets, with two Sunday matches played in Sydney, New South Wales.

== Night series ==
Collingwood defeated Hawthorn 12.8 (80) to 7.10 (52) in the final.

== Home-and-away season ==
=== Round 1 ===
Home team	Home team score	Away team	Away team score	Venue	Crowd	Date
Collingwood	9.15 (69)	Fitzroy	21.23 (149)	Victoria Park	29,345	7 April 1979
Carlton	23.13 (151)	Geelong	15.11 (101)	Princes Park	24,771	7 April 1979
South Melbourne	15.21 (111)	Richmond	19.11 (125)	SMCG	18,603	7 April 1979
St Kilda	19.14 (128)	Hawthorn	14.19 (103)	Moorabbin Oval	22,060	7 April 1979
Melbourne	18.17 (125)	Footscray	16.17 (113)	MCG	24,133	7 April 1979
North Melbourne	17.27 (129)	Essendon	16.13 (109)	NMCG	22,633	7 April 1979

=== Round 2 ===
Home team	Home team score	Away team	Away team score	Venue	Crowd	Date
Footscray	13.16 (94)	North Melbourne	20.13 (133)	Western Oval	23,457	14 April 1979
Fitzroy	12.14 (86)	South Melbourne	21.13 (139)	Junction Oval	19,437	14 April 1979
Hawthorn	13.24 (102)	Collingwood	19.18 (132)	Princes Park	29,355	14 April 1979
Geelong	15.16 (106)	Melbourne	9.13 (67)	Kardinia Park	23,858	16 April 1979
Essendon	21.22 (148)	St Kilda	9.10 (64)	Windy Hill	26,499	16 April 1979
Richmond	13.18 (96)	Carlton	23.9 (147)	MCG	59,942	16 April 1979

=== Round 3 ===
Home team	Home team score	Away team	Away team score	Venue	Crowd	Date
Essendon	11.14 (80)	Carlton	14.17 (101)	VFL Park	41,717	31 March 1979
South Melbourne	18.10 (118)	Melbourne	16.15 (111)	SMCG	14,431	21 April 1979
Hawthorn	18.15 (123)	Geelong	11.17 (83)	Princes Park	14,703	21 April 1979
St Kilda	15.14 (104)	Footscray	16.13 (109)	Moorabbin Oval	18,275	21 April 1979
Richmond	20.12 (132)	Fitzroy	16.16 (112)	MCG	24,635	21 April 1979
North Melbourne	18.19 (127)	Collingwood	14.15 (99)	NMCG	29,747	21 April 1979

Despite being formally a part of Round 3, the Essendon vs Carlton match was played as a stand-alone match on the Saturday before Round 1, and was therefore the opening match of the season.

=== Round 4 ===
	Round 4
Wednesday, 25 April (2:10 pm)	Hawthorn 29.15 (189)	def.	South Melbourne 15.5 (95)	VFL Park (crowd: 37,276)	Report
Wednesday, 25 April (2:10 pm)	Melbourne 16.23 (119)	def.	Richmond 15.19 (109)	MCG (crowd: 44,708)	Report
Saturday, 28 April (2:10 pm)	Fitzroy 11.16 (82)	def. by	Carlton 20.19 (139)	Junction Oval (crowd: 21,577)	Report
Saturday, 28 April (2:10 pm)	Collingwood 31.21 (207)	def.	St Kilda 3.11 (29)	Victoria Park (crowd: 29,380)	Report
Saturday, 28 April (2:10 pm)	Footscray 20.8 (128)	drew with	Essendon 19.14 (128)	Western Oval (crowd: 26,981)	Report
Saturday, 28 April (2:10 pm)	Geelong 10.13 (73)	def. by	North Melbourne 19.9 (123)	Kardinia Park (crowd: 21,353)	Report
In the ANZAC Day clash at VFL Park, Hawthorn kicked their highest score against South Melbourne. It was also at the time the highest score in a match that South Melbourne had conceded, the previous highest being 28.17 (185) by North Melbourne in Round 12, 1974.; At Victoria Park, Collingwood broke several records in their win against St Kilda, kicking their highest-ever score in a match – 31.21 (207), which they would top the following year against the same team – and also broke a 60-year-old League record in terms of greatest winning margin (178 points), previously held by South Melbourne, who beat St Kilda by 171 points back in Round 12, 1919.

=== Round 5 ===
Home team	Home team score	Away team	Away team score	Venue	Crowd	Date
North Melbourne	19.24 (138)	South Melbourne	12.16 (88)	NMCG	16,015	5 May 1979
Essendon	10.16 (76)	Fitzroy	25.22 (172)	Windy Hill	19,741	5 May 1979
Carlton	15.20 (110)	Melbourne	13.18 (96)	Princes Park	24,248	5 May 1979
Richmond	11.16 (82)	Hawthorn	24.17 (161)	MCG	31,448	5 May 1979
St Kilda	17.10 (112)	Geelong	22.10 (142)	Moorabbin Oval	15,481	5 May 1979
Footscray	12.17 (89)	Collingwood	20.17 (137)	VFL Park	34,163	5 May 1979

=== Round 6 ===
Home team	Home team score	Away team	Away team score	Venue	Crowd	Date
Collingwood	14.15 (99)	Essendon	19.19 (133)	Victoria Park	27,824	12 May 1979
South Melbourne	26.19 (175)	St Kilda	11.20 (86)	SMCG	12,394	12 May 1979
Geelong	9.18 (72)	Footscray	7.5 (47)	Kardinia Park	27,824	12 May 1979
Melbourne	21.14 (140)	Fitzroy	24.19 (163)	MCG	21,783	12 May 1979
Hawthorn	16.12 (108)	Carlton	25.18 (168)	Princes Park	29,935	12 May 1979
North Melbourne	14.15 (99)	Richmond	13.16 (94)	VFL Park	22,626	12 May 1979

=== Round 7 ===
Home team	Home team score	Away team	Away team score	Venue	Crowd	Date
Footscray	22.17 (149)	South Melbourne	14.17 (101)	Western Oval	15,045	19 May 1979
Fitzroy	14.18 (102)	Hawthorn	11.24 (90)	Junction Oval	15,870	19 May 1979
Essendon	23.18 (156)	Melbourne	9.20 (74)	Windy Hill	21,592	19 May 1979
Carlton	15.14 (104)	North Melbourne	16.12 (108)	Princes Park	39,411	19 May 1979
St Kilda	16.15 (111)	Richmond	14.15 (99)	Moorabbin Oval	18,087	19 May 1979
Collingwood	13.14 (92)	Geelong	6.15 (51)	VFL Park	37,260	19 May 1979

=== Round 8 ===
Home team	Home team score	Away team	Away team score	Venue	Crowd	Date
Hawthorn	17.18 (120)	Melbourne	10.17 (77)	Princes Park	10,997	26 May 1979
Richmond	22.26 (158)	Footscray	12.13 (85)	MCG	21,672	26 May 1979
North Melbourne	13.16 (94)	Fitzroy	21.22 (148)	NMCG	17,469	26 May 1979
Geelong	12.11 (83)	Essendon	12.12 (84)	Kardinia Park	25,402	26 May 1979
South Melbourne	6.8 (44)	Collingwood	20.11 (131)	SMCG	21,282	26 May 1979
St Kilda	9.10 (64)	Carlton	15.13 (103)	VFL Park	28,817	26 May 1979

=== Round 9 ===
Home team	Home team score	Away team	Away team score	Venue	Crowd	Date
Melbourne	17.9 (111)	North Melbourne	23.18 (156)	MCG	23,261	2 June 1979
Fitzroy	18.15 (123)	St Kilda	11.12 (78)	Junction Oval	14,963	2 June 1979
Collingwood	19.18 (132)	Richmond	10.20 (80)	Victoria Park	31,474	2 June 1979
Hawthorn	16.12 (108)	Essendon	17.14 (116)	Princes Park	24,875	2 June 1979
Footscray	11.12 (78)	Carlton	18.19 (127)	Western Oval	21,362	2 June 1979
Geelong	18.15 (123)	South Melbourne	17.8 (110)	VFL Park	15,750	2 June 1979

=== Round 10 ===
Home team	Home team score	Away team	Away team score	Venue	Crowd	Date
Essendon	16.19 (115)	South Melbourne	14.15 (99)	Windy Hill	18,916	9 June 1979
Carlton	18.15 (123)	Collingwood	16.11 (107)	Princes Park	46,106	9 June 1979
St Kilda	9.11 (65)	Melbourne	12.13 (85)	Moorabbin Oval	17,390	9 June 1979
Richmond	14.17 (101)	Geelong	18.19 (127)	MCG	24,824	9 June 1979
Footscray	11.8 (74)	Fitzroy	17.17 (119)	VFL Park	14,357	9 June 1979
North Melbourne	16.9 (105)	Hawthorn	23.18 (156)	SCG	31,391	10 June 1979

=== Round 11 ===
Home team	Home team score	Away team	Away team score	Venue	Crowd	Date
Fitzroy	19.18 (132)	Geelong	9.11 (65)	Junction Oval	17,520	16 June 1979
Hawthorn	15.10 (100)	Footscray	15.11 (101)	Princes Park	12,513	16 June 1979
Melbourne	11.16 (82)	Collingwood	13.18 (96)	MCG	53,562	16 June 1979
St Kilda	15.17 (107)	North Melbourne	16.14 (110)	Moorabbin Oval	19,705	18 June 1979
South Melbourne	18.18 (126)	Carlton	20.12 (132)	SMCG	26,740	18 June 1979
Richmond	16.12 (108)	Essendon	20.12 (132)	VFL Park	53,116	18 June 1979

=== Round 12 ===
Home team	Home team score	Away team	Away team score	Venue	Crowd	Date
Richmond	25.16 (166)	South Melbourne	16.14 (110)	MCG	21,216	23 June 1979
Hawthorn	19.18 (132)	St Kilda	13.15 (93)	Princes Park	13,176	23 June 1979
Footscray	18.12 (120)	Melbourne	11.15 (81)	Western Oval	14,308	23 June 1979
Essendon	15.11 (101)	North Melbourne	6.18 (54)	Windy Hill	30,795	23 June 1979
Geelong	15.17 (107)	Carlton	14.17 (101)	Kardinia Park	29,941	23 June 1979
Fitzroy	17.20 (122)	Collingwood	11.14 (80)	VFL Park	56,975	23 June 1979

=== Round 13 ===
Home team	Home team score	Away team	Away team score	Venue	Crowd	Date
Collingwood	25.19 (169)	Hawthorn	8.16 (64)	Victoria Park	22,903	30 June 1979
Carlton	21.12 (138)	Richmond	12.10 (82)	Princes Park	21,792	30 June 1979
North Melbourne	8.21 (69)	Footscray	12.9 (81)	NMCG	13,925	30 June 1979
South Melbourne	15.20 (110)	Fitzroy	20.16 (136)	SMCG	13,850	30 June 1979
St Kilda	9.12 (66)	Essendon	15.15 (105)	Moorabbin Oval	18,802	30 June 1979
Melbourne	9.3 (57)	Geelong	16.12 (108)	VFL Park	13,272	30 June 1979

=== Round 14 ===
Home team	Home team score	Away team	Away team score	Venue	Crowd	Date
Essendon	10.11 (71)	Footscray	6.14 (50)	Windy Hill	25,240	7 July 1979
Richmond	17.18 (120)	Melbourne	10.16 (76)	MCG	19,879	7 July 1979
South Melbourne	13.11 (89)	Hawthorn	10.14 (74)	SMCG	10,626	7 July 1979
North Melbourne	17.16 (118)	Geelong	14.16 (100)	NMCG	14,971	7 July 1979
St Kilda	6.16 (52)	Collingwood	15.11 (101)	Moorabbin Oval	21,588	7 July 1979
Carlton	17.14 (116)	Fitzroy	9.11 (65)	VFL Park	58,736	7 July 1979

=== Round 15 ===
Home team	Home team score	Away team	Away team score	Venue	Crowd	Date
Melbourne	24.23 (167)	South Melbourne	24.10 (154)	MCG	15,039	14 July 1979
Footscray	24.16 (160)	St Kilda	11.15 (81)	Western Oval	13,386	14 July 1979
Collingwood	10.16 (76)	North Melbourne	20.13 (133)	Victoria Park	30,415	14 July 1979
Carlton	18.18 (126)	Essendon	12.11 (83)	Princes Park	44,661	14 July 1979
Geelong	11.12 (78)	Hawthorn	11.13 (79)	VFL Park	20,777	14 July 1979
Fitzroy	20.15 (135)	Richmond	22.20 (152)	SCG	17,140	15 July 1979

=== Round 16 ===
Home team	Home team score	Away team	Away team score	Venue	Crowd	Date
Hawthorn	14.20 (104)	Richmond	18.11 (119)	Princes Park	13,557	21 July 1979
Geelong	20.9 (129)	St Kilda	14.20 (104)	Kardinia Park	14,613	21 July 1979
Collingwood	23.17 (155)	Footscray	3.15 (33)	Victoria Park	21,041	21 July 1979
Fitzroy	16.16 (112)	Essendon	15.9 (99)	Junction Oval	19,684	21 July 1979
Melbourne	9.7 (61)	Carlton	19.26 (140)	MCG	26,388	21 July 1979
South Melbourne	8.18 (66)	North Melbourne	12.16 (88)	VFL Park	14,725	21 July 1979

=== Round 17 ===
Home team	Home team score	Away team	Away team score	Venue	Crowd	Date
St Kilda	19.14 (128)	South Melbourne	16.12 (108)	Moorabbin Oval	12,969	28 July 1979
Footscray	12.10 (82)	Geelong	18.14 (122)	Western Oval	14,284	28 July 1979
Carlton	15.21 (111)	Hawthorn	12.11 (83)	Princes Park	22,159	28 July 1979
Richmond	16.15 (111)	North Melbourne	19.10 (124)	MCG	38,111	28 July 1979
Essendon	9.17 (71)	Collingwood	14.8 (92)	Windy Hill	31,968	28 July 1979
Fitzroy (details)	36.22 (238)	Melbourne	6.12 (48)	VFL Park	12,149	28 July 1979

- Fitzroy's 190-point winning margin remains, as of 2026, the biggest in AFL/VFL history.

=== Round 18 ===
Home team	Home team score	Away team	Away team score	Venue	Crowd	Date
South Melbourne	31.9 (195)	Footscray	15.16 (106)	SMCG	9,815	4 August 1979
Hawthorn	15.14 (104)	Fitzroy	15.25 (115)	Princes Park	15,104	4 August 1979
Melbourne	21.8 (134)	Essendon	16.9 (105)	MCG	25,367	4 August 1979
Geelong	18.16 (124)	Collingwood	9.9 (63)	Kardinia Park	30,495	4 August 1979
North Melbourne	18.11 (119)	Carlton	21.15 (141)	NMCG	28,902	4 August 1979
Richmond	28.22 (190)	St Kilda	18.11 (119)	VFL Park	24,651	4 August 1979

=== Round 19 ===
Home team	Home team score	Away team	Away team score	Venue	Crowd	Date
Footscray	13.19 (97)	Richmond	6.5 (41)	Western Oval	12,537	11 August 1979
Fitzroy	7.12 (54)	North Melbourne	17.19 (121)	Junction Oval	16,659	11 August 1979
Essendon	14.12 (96)	Geelong	8.8 (56)	Windy Hill	23,336	11 August 1979
Collingwood	14.11 (95)	South Melbourne	13.9 (87)	Victoria Park	18,041	11 August 1979
Carlton	22.17 (149)	St Kilda	6.9 (45)	Princes Park	17,127	11 August 1979
Melbourne	8.25 (73)	Hawthorn	14.11 (95)	VFL Park	12,897	11 August 1979

=== Round 20 ===
Home team	Home team score	Away team	Away team score	Venue	Crowd	Date
Essendon	9.16 (70)	Hawthorn	10.14 (74)	Windy Hill	19,034	18 August 1979
North Melbourne	15.27 (117)	Melbourne	6.9 (45)	NMCG	10,680	18 August 1979
South Melbourne	16.6 (102)	Geelong	10.12 (72)	SMCG	11,298	18 August 1979
St Kilda	9.6 (60)	Fitzroy	10.16 (76)	Moorabbin Oval	12,330	18 August 1979
Richmond	10.15 (75)	Collingwood	13.17 (95)	MCG	61,624	18 August 1979
Carlton	12.18 (90)	Footscray	8.6 (54)	VFL Park	25,075	18 August 1979

=== Round 21 ===
Home team	Home team score	Away team	Away team score	Venue	Crowd	Date
Melbourne	24.17 (161)	St Kilda	12.24 (96)	MCG	18,435	25 August 1979
Hawthorn	7.18 (60)	North Melbourne	24.21 (165)	Princes Park	18,501	25 August 1979
Geelong	17.13 (115)	Richmond	12.17 (89)	Kardinia Park	18,039	25 August 1979
Fitzroy	22.19 (151)	Footscray	14.16 (100)	Junction Oval	12,076	25 August 1979
Collingwood	18.12 (120)	Carlton	14.17 (101)	Victoria Park	36,509	25 August 1979
South Melbourne	10.16 (76)	Essendon	13.17 (95)	VFL Park	32,127	25 August 1979

=== Round 22 ===
Home team	Home team score	Away team	Away team score	Venue	Crowd	Date
Footscray	9.11 (65)	Hawthorn	14.19 (103)	Western Oval	12,839	1 September 1979
Essendon	8.15 (63)	Richmond	18.14 (122)	Windy Hill	22,589	1 September 1979
Collingwood	23.16 (154)	Melbourne	15.13 (103)	Victoria Park	27,206	1 September 1979
Carlton	23.16 (154)	South Melbourne	17.19 (121)	Princes Park	24,479	1 September 1979
Geelong	16.16 (112)	Fitzroy	15.17 (107)	Kardinia Park	21,801	1 September 1979
North Melbourne	21.18 (144)	St Kilda	9.11 (65)	VFL Park	20,571	1 September 1979

== Ladder ==
(P)	Premiers
	Qualified for finals

#	Team	P	W	L	D	PF	PA	%	Pts
1	Carlton (P)	22	19	3	0	2772	1986	139.6	76
2	North Melbourne	22	17	5	0	2574	2083	123.6	68
3	Collingwood	22	15	7	0	2501	1974	126.7	60
4	Fitzroy	22	15	7	0	2699	2198	122.8	60
5	Essendon	22	12	9	1	2236	2127	105.1	50
6	Geelong	22	12	10	0	2149	2140	100.4	48
7	Hawthorn	22	10	12	0	2332	2336	99.8	40
8	Richmond	22	9	13	0	2451	2512	97.6	36
9	Footscray	22	7	14	1	2015	2463	81.8	30
10	South Melbourne	22	6	16	0	2424	2666	90.9	24
11	Melbourne	22	6	16	0	2093	2759	75.9	24
12	St Kilda	22	3	19	0	1857	2859	65.0	12

Rules for classification: 1. premiership points; 2. percentage; 3. points for
Average score: 106.5
Source: AFL Tables

== Finals series ==
=== Finals week 1 ===
Home team	Score	Away team	Score	Venue	Crowd	Date
Fitzroy	17.22 (124)	Essendon	5.13 (43)	VFL Park	49,470	8 September
Collingwood	9.28 (82)	North Melbourne	18.13 (121)	MCG	84,660	8 September

=== Finals week 2 ===
Home team	Score	Away team	Score	Venue	Crowd	Date
Collingwood	16.20 (116)	Fitzroy	12.22 (94)	MCG	87,139	15 September
Carlton	15.21 (111)	North Melbourne	11.7 (73)	VFL Park	69,142	15 September

=== Preliminary final ===
Home team	Score	Away team	Score	Venue	Crowd	Date
North Melbourne	13.17 (95)	Collingwood	18.14 (122)	VFL Park	73,380	22 September

=== Grand final ===
Game	Home team	Home team score	Away team	Away team score	Venue	Crowd	Date
Grand final	Carlton	11.16 (82)	Collingwood	11.11 (77)	MCG	113,545	29 September 1979

== Season notes ==
- The record for greatest winning margin was set twice during 1979.
  - In Round 4, Collingwood defeated St Kilda by 178 points, breaking the record set sixty years earlier, in the 1919 VFL season by South Melbourne.
  - Collingwood's new record was broken only three months later in Round 17, when Fitzroy defeated Melbourne by 190 points, a record which remains as of 2026.
- Fitzroy's score of 36.22 (238) in the same game also set the record for highest score in a VFL/AFL game. This beat the record set by Footscray in the 1978 VFL season by twenty-five points, and remained the record until 1992.
- Fitzroy made the finals for the first time since 1960, ending a nineteen-year finals drought.

== Awards ==
- The leading goalkicker was Kelvin Templeton of Footscray with 91 goals
- The Brownlow Medal was won by Peter Moore
- The reserves premiership, known as the Commodore Cup, was won by North Melbourne. North Melbourne 13.14 (92) defeated Collingwood 9.13 (67) in the grand final, held as a stand-alone night match at VFL Park on Friday, 28 September, before a crowd of 6,047.

== See also ==
- List of VFL debuts in 1979

== Sources ==
- 1979 VFL season at AFL Tables
- 1979 VFL season at Australian Football
