= List of VFL/AFL commissioners and club presidents =

This is a listing of all the commissioners and club presidents of the VFL/AFL.

An independent VFL Commission was formed in 1985, being renamed the AFL Commission in 1990 in line with the competition.

In 1993, the AFL Commission was given the power to make most administrative decisions relating to the league unilaterally, with the AFL Board of Directors voting itself out of existence. In 1995, the AFL Commission would also assume control of the administration of Australian rules football when it absorbed the ANFC.

A separate role of AFL Chairman was created in 1993 (see below).

== List of VFL/AFL CEOs ==
VFL President (1897–1985), VFL/AFL Chairman/Chief Executive Officer (since 1985)
No.	Name (birth–death)	Term of office			State	VFL/AFL club	Notes
No.	Name (birth–death)	Took office	Left office	Time in office	State	VFL/AFL club	Notes
1	Alex McCracken (1856–1915)	12 April 1897	28 May 1915	18 years, 46 days	(Victoria (state)) Victoria	Essendon	Resigned due to ill health
2	Oliver Morrice Williams (1857–1938)	19 October 1915	25 May 1917	1 year, 218 days	(Victoria (state)) Victoria	University	Resigned
—	Chas Brownlow (1861–1924) (acting)	25 May 1917	27 June 1919	2 years, 33 days	(Victoria (state)) Victoria	Geelong	Served in an acting capacity after Williams' resignation
3	Walter Baldwin Spencer (1860–1929)	27 June 1919	4 March 1926	6 years, 250 days	(Victoria (state)) Victoria	Carlton	Resigned
4	William C. McClelland (1875–1957)	4 March 1926	21 March 1956	30 years, 17 days	(Victoria (state)) Victoria	Melbourne	Resigned due to ill health
5	Kenneth Luke (1896–1971)	21 March 1956	13 June 1971	15 years, 84 days	(Victoria (state)) Victoria	Carlton	Died in office
6	Maurice Nathan (1914–1982)	1 July 1971	c. 1 June 1977	5 years, 335 days	(Victoria (state)) Victoria	Carlton	
7	Allen Aylett (1934–2022)	c. 1 June 1977	5 December 1984	c. 7 years, 187 days	(Victoria (state)) Victoria	North Melbourne	
Title of "VFL/AFL Chief Commissioner" adopted; later replaced with "AFL CEO"
8	Jack Hamilton (1928–1990)	c. December 1984	October 1986	c. 1 year, 300 days	(Victoria (state)) Victoria	Collingwood	Resigned
9	Ross Oakley (1942–)	October 1986	October 1996	c. 10 years, 0 days	(Victoria (state)) Victoria	St Kilda	Resigned
10	Wayne Jackson (1944–)	October 1996	28 September 2003	c. 6 years, 362 days	South Australia	—	Resigned
11	Andrew Demetriou (1961–)	28 September 2003	30 April 2014	10 years, 214 days	(Victoria (state)) Victoria	—	Resigned
12	Gillon McLachlan (1973–)	30 April 2014	1 October 2023	9 years, 154 days	South Australia	—	Resigned
13	Andrew Dillon (1970–)	1 October 2023	Incumbent	3 years, 36 days (Note: As of 6 November 2026.)	(Victoria (state)) Victoria	—	

== AFL Chairman (since 1993) ==
Name	Term in office
John Kennedy, Sr.	1993–1997
Ron Evans AM	1997–2007
Mike Fitzpatrick	2007–2017
Richard Goyder	2017–2026
Craig Drummond	2026-

== Club Presidents ==
=== Adelaide ===
- Bob Hammond (1991–2000)
- Bob Campbell (2001–2003)
- Bill Sanders (2004–2008)
- Rob Chapman (2009–2020)
- John Olsen (2021–present)

=== Brisbane Bears/Lions ===
- Paul Cronin (1987–1990)
- Noel Gordon (1990–1999)
- Alan Piper (1999–2000)
- Graeme Downie (2000–2006)
- Tony Kelly (2006–2010)
- Angus Johnson (2010–2013)
- Bob Sharpless (2013–2017)
- Andrew Wellington (2017–present)

=== Carlton ===
- Robert McFarland (1864–1865)
- James Linacre (1865)
- George Coppin (1866–1872)
- John Walls (1873)
- Robert Robertson (1874–1885)
- Arthur Gillespie (1886–1894)
- Frederick Bromley (1895)
- A. H. Shaw (1896–1901)
- Robert Heatley (1901–1904)
- H. B. Higgins (1904–1905)
- W. F. Evans (1905–1907)
- J. Urquhart (1907–1910)
- J. McInerney (1910–1912)
- D. Bell (1912–1914)
- Jack Gardiner (1914–1925)
- D. Young (1925–1928)
- Dave Crone (1929–1938)
- Sir Kenneth Luke (1938–1956)
- Horrie Clover (1956–1958)
- L. J. M. Holmes (1958–1965)
- George Harris (1965–1975, 1978–1980)
- Ivan Rohrt (1975–1978)
- Ian Rice (1980–1983)
- John Elliott (1983–2002)
- Ian Collins (2002–2006)
- Graham Smorgon (2006–2007)
- Richard Pratt (2007–2008)
- Stephen Kernahan (2008–2014)
- Mark LoGiudice (2014–2021)
- Luke Sayers (2021–2025)
- Robert Priestley (2025–present)

=== Collingwood ===
- William Beazley (1892–1911)
- Alfred Cross (1912)
- Jim Sharp (1913–1923)
- Harry Curtis (1924–1950)
- Syd Coventry (1950–1962)
- Tom Sherrin (1963–1974)
- Ern Clarke (1975–1976)
- John Hickey (1977–1981)
- Ranald Macdonald (1982–1986)
- Allan McAllister (1986–1995)
- Kevin Rose (1996–1998)
- Eddie McGuire (1998–2021)
- Mark Korda (2021)
- Jeff Browne (2021–2024)
- Barry Carp (2024–present)

=== Essendon ===
- Robert McCracken (1877–1885)
- James Robertson (1886)
- Alexander McCracken (1887–1903)
- W. Kent-Hughes (1904–1907)
- A. L. Crichton (1908–1919)
- W. Raper (1920–1925)
- A. F. McGowan (1926–1929)
- F. F. Campbell (1930–1934)
- A. F. Showers (1935–1940)
- N. H. Mirams (1940)
- W. R. Crichton (1941–1959)
- W. G. Brew (1959–1968)
- Allan Hird Snr (1969–1975)
- Colin Stubbs (1976–1980)
- Greg Sewell (1981–1987)
- Ron Evans (1988–1992)
- David Shaw (1992–1996)
- Graeme McMahon (1996–2003)
- Neil McKissock (2003–2006)
- Ray Horsburgh (2006–2009)
- David Evans (2009–2013)
- Paul Little (2013–2015)
- Lindsay Tanner (2015–2020)
- Paul Brasher (2020–2022)
- David Barham (2022–2025)
- Andrew Welsh (2025–current)

=== Fitzroy ===
- John McMahon (1884–1887)
- Robert Best (1887–1910)
- Don Chandler (1910–1930)
- Bill Hannah (1930–1932)
- Alec Sloan (1932–1933)
- Ossie Porter (1933–1936)
- Bill Raymond (1936–1938)
- Harold McLennan (1938–1947)
- George Hook (1947–1951)
- Les Phelan (1951–1964)
- Ern Joseph (1964–1975)
- Frank Bibby (1975–1980)
- Keith Wiegard (1980–1984)
- Bruce White (1984–1985)
- Leon Wiegard (1985–1991)
- Dyson Hore-Lacy (1991–1996)

=== Fremantle ===
- Ross Kelly (1995–1998, Chairman)
- Ross McLean (1999–2001, Chairman)
- Rick Hart (2002–2009, titled Chairman until 2004, President since 2005)
- Steve Harris (2009–2016)
- Dale Alcock (2016–2023)
- Chris Sutherland (2023–present)

=== Geelong ===
- S.S. Rennie (1861–1864)
- E.R. Lennon (1867–1872)
- J.J. Buckland (1873)
- George Rippon (1874–1876)
- Hermann Reichmann (1876)
- J.J. Buckland (1877)
- P. Dwyer (1878)
- James Wilson Sr (1878–1883)
- J.R. Hopkins (1884–1885)
- F. Orchard (1886)
- James Wilson Jr (1887–1888)
- John Sommers (1889)
- George Steedman (1890)
- Joseph Grey (1891–1899)
- J. McMullen (1900–1902)
- Harry Hodges (1903–1909)
- Arthur Bowman (1910–1920)
- Robert Smith (1921–1922)
- Walter Carr (1922)
- James Piper (1923–1926)
- Joe Thear (1927–1929)
- Morris Jacobs (1930–1938)
- Tom Hawkes (1939)
- Basil Collins (1940–1945)
- Jack Jennings (1946–1970)
- Vern Johnstone (1971–1973)
- Neil Trezise (1974–1975)
- Owen Graham (1976–1979)
- John Holt (1980–1982)
- Kevin Threlfall (1983–1987)
- Wayne Bannon (1987–1988)
- Ron Hovey (1988–1998)
- Frank Costa (1998–2010)
- Colin Carter (2010–2021)
- Craig Drummond (2021–2024)
- Grant McCabe (2024–present)

=== Gold Coast ===
- John Witheriff (2011–2016)
- Tony Cochrane (2016–2023)
- Bob East (2023–present)

=== Greater Western Sydney ===
- Tony Shepherd (2012–2023)
- Tim Reed (2023–present)

=== Hawthorn ===
- J. C. Watts (1902)
- George Swinburne (1903)
- C. O. Shave (1906)
- Col. Pleasants (1907)
- W. M. Burton (1908–1909, 1912)
- H. Henningsen (1910)
- Charles Bethune (1911, 1914–1915)
- Cr. Wood (1913)
- W. H. "Bill" Hulse (1916)
- Edward Ward (1919)
- F. O. Small (1920)
- J. "Bill" Kennon (1921–1931)
- Dr Jacob Jona J.P. (1932–1949)
- David Prentice (1949–1953)
- A. "Sandy" Ferguson (1953–1968)
- Phil Ryan (1968–1980)
- Ron Cook (1980–1988)
- Trevor Coote (1988–1994)
- Geoff Lord (1994–1995)
- Brian Coleman (1995–1996)
- Ian Dicker (1996–2005)
- Jeff Kennett (2005–2011, 2017–2022)
- Andrew Newbold (2011–2016)
- Richard Garvey (2016–2017)
- Andy Gowers (2022–present)

=== Melbourne ===
- Frank Grey-Smith (1883–1890)
- R. H. McLeod (1890–1897)
- H. C. A. Harrison (1897–1906)
- T. F. Morkham (1907–1910)
- A. A. Aitken (1911)
- William C. McClelland (1912–1926)
- Vernon Ransford (1927–1928)
- Joe Blair (1929–1946)
- William Flintoft (1947–1949)
- Albert Chadwick (1950–1962)
- Donald Duffy (1963–1974)
- John Mitchell (1975–1978)
- Wayne Reid (1979–1980)
- Sir Billy Snedden (1981–1986)
- Stuart Spencer (1986–1991)
- Ian Ridley (1991–1996)
- Joseph Gutnick (1996–2002)
- Gabriel Szondy (2002–2003)
- Paul Gardner (2003–2008)
- Jim Stynes (2008–2012)
- Don McLardy (2012–2013)
- Peter Spargo (2013)
- Glen Bartlett (2013–2021)
- Kate Roffey (2021–2023)
- Brad Green (2023–present)

=== North Melbourne/Kangaroos ===
- John McIndoe (1869–1871)
- R. J. Alcock (1872–1873)
- Dr. Burke (1874)
- R. Sutcliffe (1875, 1877–1881)
- E. Harcourt (1882–1885)
- R. K. Montgomerie (1886)
- M. Evans (1887–1891)
- J. Barwise (1892–1895, 1897)
- N. M. O'Donnell (1896)
- D. Wadick (1898)
- W. H. Fuller (1899–1900)
- James Gardiner (1901)
- G. M. Prendergast (1902–1911)
- Clem Davidson (1912–1919)
- T. F. Jenyns (1920)
- B. Deveney (1921)
- George E Ravenhall (1922–1923)
- A. J. Russell (1924)
- Patrick Sullivan (1924–1928)
- Dr D Berman (1928)
- Arthur Calwell (1928–1934)
- Dr D Berman (1934–1937)
- Frank Trainor (1937–1952)
- Johnny Meere (1952–1953)
- Phonse Tobin (1953–1956)
- Alex Marr (1956–1962)
- Jack Adams (1962–1965)
- Tony Trainor (1965–1971)
- Allen Aylett (1971–1977)
- Lloyd Holyoak (1977–1980)
- Al Mantello (1980)
- Bob Ansett (1980–1992)
- Ron Casey (1992–2000)
- Andrew Carter (2000–2001)
- Allen Aylett (2001–2005)
- Graham Duff (2005–2007)
- John Magowan (2007)
- James Brayshaw (2007–2016)
- Ben Buckley (2016–2022)
- Dr Sonja Hood (2022–present)

=== Port Adelaide ===
SANFL

- J. Hart Snr (1870–1879)
- J. Formby (1880–1892)
- J. Cleave (1893–1894)
- W. Fisher (1895–1900)
- R. Cruickshank (1901)
- W. E. Mattinson (1902–1911)
- R. Cruickshank (1912)
- Dr A. V. Benson (1913–1921)
- S. H. Skipper (1922–1925)
- Dr P. T. S. Cherry (1927–1931, 1937–1949)
- C. T. Gunn (1932–1936)
- Dr W. H. Baudinet (1950–1951)
- F. B. Harvey (1952–1972)
- K. L. Duthie (1973–1985)
- B. H. Weber (1986–1992)

AFL

- Greg Boulton (1993–2008)
- Brett Duncanson (2008–2012)
- David Koch (2013–present)

=== Richmond ===
- George Bennett (1887–1908)
- Frank Tudor (1909–1918)
- Alf Wood (1919–1923)
- Jack Archer (1924–1931)
- Barney Herbert (1932–1935, 1939)
- Lou Roberts (1936–1938)
- Harry Dyke (1940–1958)
- Maurie Fleming (1958–1963)
- Ray Dunn (1964–1971)
- Alistair Boord (1971–1973)
- Ian Wilson (1974–1985)
- Barry Richardson (1985)
- Bill Durham (1986)
- Alan Bond (1987)
- Neville Crowe (1987–1993)
- Leon Daphne (1993–1999)
- Clinton Casey (2000–2005)
- Gary March (2005–2013)
- Peggy O'Neal (2013–2022)
- John O'Rourke (2022–present)

=== St Kilda ===
- Dave McNamara (1939–1940)
- E. C. Mitty (1940–1945)
- Reuben Sackville (1946–1955)
- Jack Reilly (1958)
- Graham Huggins (1959–1979)
- Lindsay Fox (1979–1985)
- David Perry (1985–1986)
- Travis Payze (1987–1993)
- Andrew Plympton (1993–2001)
- Rod Butterss (2001–2007)
- Greg Westaway (2007–2013)
- Peter Summers (2013–2018)
- Andrew Bassat (2018–present)

=== South Melbourne/Sydney ===
- A. Brown (1881)
- Henry Dodds (1881–1891)
- A. G. Major (1895, 1898)
- Dr Thomson (1896)
- John Sloss (1897)
- Thomas Craine (1899–1903)
- Henry Hawkins Skinner (1904–1911)
- George A. Emslie (1912–1917)
- Joseph Francis Hannon (1919)
- Robert Melville Cuthbertson (1920–1928)
- Jack Rohan (1929–1932)
- Archie Crofts (1933–1937)
- J. D. M. Dickson (1938–1941)
- Lionel Newton (1942–1945)
- J. P. Cullen (1946–1959)
- W. R. Tait (1960–1963)
- R. C. Warner (1963)
- C. V. Ridgway (1964–1967)
- Brian Bourke (1967–1972)
- S. Keane (1972–1973)
- K. G. Hooker (1974–1975)
- Craig Kimberley (1976–1977, 1986–1988)
- G. Camakaris (1977–1978)
- Graeme John (1978–1981)
- Jack Marks (1981–1985)
- Dr Geoffrey Edelsten (1985–1986)
- Peter Weinert (1988–1993)
- Richard Colless (1993–2013)
- Andrew Pridham (2013–present)

=== Footscray/Western Bulldogs ===
- David Mitchell (1886–1893)
- James Tucker (1893–1894)
- James Cuming (1894–1911)
- Frank Shillabeer (1911–1912)
- Arch Crow (1912–1921)
- George Sayer (1922, 1926)
- James Stephens (1923)
- George Farnsworth (1924)
- L. Caldecott (1925)
- Kevin McCarthy (1926–1938)
- Bert Jamieson (1938–1941)
- Con Curtain (1941–1946)
- Otto Grobbecker (1946–1949, 1953–1955)
- Con Weickhardt (1949–1952)
- Bernie Barry (1955–1960)
- Harry Dolphin (1960–1962)
- Jim Miller (1962–1966)
- Jack Collins (1966–1973)
- Dick Collinson (1973–1978)
- Charlie Sutton (1979–1981)
- G. Gray (1981–1981)
- Tony Capes (1982–1988)
- Barry Beattie (1988–1989)
- Nick Columb (1989)
- Peter Gordon (1989–1996, 2012–2020)
- David Smorgon (1996–2012)
- Kylie Watson-Wheeler (2020–present)

=== West Coast ===
- Richard Colless (1987)
- Neil Hamilton (1987–1989)
- Terry O'Connor (1989–1992)
- Dwane Buckland (1992–1996)
- Murray McHenry (1996–1998)
- Michael Smith (1998–2002)
- Dalton Gooding (2002–2007)
- Mark Barnaba (2007–2010)
- Alan Cransberg (2010–2016)
- Russell Gibbs (2016–2022)
- Paul Fitzpatrick (2022–2025)
- Elizabeth Gaines (2025-present)
