= Electoral results for the Division of Barker =

Australian division election results

This is a list of electoral results for the Division of Barker in Australian federal elections from the division's creation in 1903 until the present.

== Members ==
Member	Party	Term
Sir Langdon Bonython	Protectionist	1903–1906
John Livingston	Anti-Socialist	1906–1909
John Livingston	Liberal	1909–1917
John Livingston	Nationalist	1917–1922
Malcolm Cameron	Liberal	1922–1925
Malcolm Cameron	Nationalist	1925–1931
Malcolm Cameron	United Australia	1931–1934
Archie Cameron	Country	1934–1940
Archie Cameron	United Australia	1940–1945
Archie Cameron	Liberal	1945–1956
Jim Forbes	Liberal	1956–1975
James Porter	Liberal	1975–1990
Ian McLachlan	Liberal	1990–1998
Patrick Secker	Liberal	1998–2013
Tony Pasin	Liberal	2013–present

== Election results ==
=== Elections in the 2020s ===
==== 2025 ====
2025 Australian federal election: Barker
Party	Candidate	Votes	%	±%
Liberal	Tony Pasin			
Independent	Rosa Hillam			
National	Jonathan Pietzsch			
Labor	James Rothe			
One Nation	Jennifer Troeth			
Family First	Michael Brohier			
Independent	Ian Penno			
Trumpet of Patriots	Robert Jameson			
Greens	Major Moogy Sumner			
Independent	Cody Scholes			
Total formal votes				
Informal votes				
Turnout				

==== 2022 ====
2022 Australian federal election: Barker
Party	Candidate	Votes	%	±%
Liberal	Tony Pasin	56,330	53.24	−4.64
Labor	Mark Braes	22,054	20.85	−0.16
Greens	Rosa Hillam	7,841	7.41	+0.57
One Nation	Carlos Quaremba	6,958	6.58	+6.58
United Australia	David Swiggs	4,222	3.99	−1.93
Independent	Maddy Fry	3,190	3.02	+3.02
National	Jonathan Pietzsch	2,531	2.39	−0.26
Independent	Vince Pannell	1,913	1.81	+1.81
Federation	Kym Hanton	760	0.72	+0.72
Total formal votes		105,799	93.04	−1.39
Informal votes		7,909	6.96	+1.39
Turnout		113,708	92.20	−2.33
Two-party-preferred result
Liberal	Tony Pasin	70,483	66.62	−2.32
Labor	Mark Braes	35,316	33.38	+2.32
Liberal hold		Swing	−2.32	

Alluvial diagram for preference flows in the seat of Barker in the 2022 federal election. The winning candidate got over 50% of first preference votes, so this alluvial diagram is indicative only, and preference flows were not used to determine the final result. The preference flows were used to determine the two-candidate-preferred.

=== Elections in the 2010s ===
==== 2019 ====
2019 Australian federal election: Barker
Party	Candidate	Votes	%	±%
Liberal	Tony Pasin	61,155	57.88	+12.35
Labor	Mat O'Brien	22,205	21.01	+4.68
Greens	Rosa Hillam	7,229	6.84	+3.23
United Australia	Bert Bacher	6,259	5.92	+5.92
Centre Alliance	Kelly Gladigau	3,082	2.92	−25.67
Animal Justice	Karen Eckermann	2,940	2.78	+2.78
National	Miles Hannemann	2,796	2.65	+2.65
Total formal votes		105,666	94.43	−1.31
Informal votes		6,227	5.57	+1.31
Turnout		111,893	94.53	+0.50
Two-party-preferred result
Liberal	Tony Pasin	72,851	68.94	+14.20
Labor	Mat O'Brien	32,815	31.06	+31.06
Liberal hold		Swing	+14.20	

==== 2016 ====
2016 Australian federal election: Barker
Party	Candidate	Votes	%	±%
Liberal	Tony Pasin	44,001	46.59	−6.02
Xenophon	James Stacey	27,452	29.07	+29.07
Labor	Mat O'Brien	14,363	15.21	−3.16
Family First	Yvonne Zeppel	5,458	5.78	−2.18
Greens	Mark Keough	3,171	3.36	−2.29
Total formal votes		94,445	95.72	+1.10
Informal votes		4,228	4.28	−1.10
Turnout		98,673	93.44	−1.18
Notional two-party-preferred count
Liberal	Tony Pasin	61,566	65.19	−1.36
Labor	Mat O'Brien	32,879	34.81	+1.36
Two-candidate-preferred result
Liberal	Tony Pasin	51,698	54.74	−11.81
Xenophon	James Stacey	42,747	45.26	+45.26
Liberal hold		Swing	N/A	

==== 2013 ====
2013 Australian federal election: Barker
Party	Candidate	Votes	%	±%
Liberal	Tony Pasin	48,678	52.61	−2.47
Labor	Phil Golding	16,993	18.37	−9.62
Family First	Kristin Lambert	7,368	7.96	+1.78
Independent	Richard Sage	6,617	7.15	+7.15
Greens	Mark Keough	5,224	5.65	−3.39
National	Miles Hannemann	4,021	4.35	+4.35
Palmer United	Balwinder Singh Jhandi	3,623	3.92	+3.92
Total formal votes		92,524	94.62	+0.12
Informal votes		5,259	5.38	−0.12
Turnout		97,783	94.63	−0.35
Two-party-preferred result
Liberal	Tony Pasin	61,571	66.55	+3.54
Labor	Phil Golding	30,953	33.45	−3.54
Liberal hold		Swing	+3.54	

==== 2010 ====
2010 Australian federal election: Barker
Party	Candidate	Votes	%	±%
Liberal	Patrick Secker	51,810	54.96	+8.15
Labor	Simone McDonnell	26,433	28.04	−2.03
Greens	Sean Moffat	8,607	9.13	+4.06
Family First	Trevor Honeychurch	5,829	6.18	+0.46
Climate Sceptics	Steven Davies	1,591	1.69	+1.69
Total formal votes		94,270	94.54	−1.61
Informal votes		5,443	5.46	+1.61
Turnout		99,713	95.07	−0.90
Two-party-preferred result
Liberal	Patrick Secker	59,278	62.88	+3.43
Labor	Simone McDonnell	34,992	37.12	−3.43
Liberal hold		Swing	+3.43	

=== Elections in the 2000s ===
==== 2007 ====
2007 Australian federal election: Barker
Party	Candidate	Votes	%	±%
Liberal	Patrick Secker	44,329	46.81	−6.36
Labor	Karen Lock	28,475	30.07	+8.60
National	Deb Thiele	9,695	10.24	−0.35
Family First	Phil Cornish	5,418	5.72	−0.10
Greens	Andrew Jennings	4,796	5.06	+0.98
Democrats	Justin Sneath	1,984	2.10	+0.62
Total formal votes		94,697	96.15	+2.02
Informal votes		3,793	3.85	−2.02
Turnout		98,490	95.97	+0.49
Two-party-preferred result
Liberal	Patrick Secker	56,301	59.45	−10.43
Labor	Karen Lock	38,396	40.55	+10.43
Liberal hold		Swing	−10.43	

==== 2004 ====
2004 Australian federal election: Barker
Party	Candidate	Votes	%	±%
Liberal	Patrick Secker	48,233	53.17	−2.95
Labor	Waluwe Simpson-Lyttle	19,478	21.47	−2.01
National	Tim Jackson	9,611	10.59	+10.59
Family First	Philip Cornish	5,276	5.82	+5.82
Greens	Pam Kelly	3,704	4.08	+0.98
Independent	Rodger Schmidt	1,572	1.73	+1.73
One Nation	Neil Russell-Taylor	1,501	1.65	−6.24
Democrats	Graham McNaughton	1,339	1.48	−4.66
Total formal votes		90,714	94.13	−0.34
Informal votes		5,662	5.87	+0.34
Turnout		96,376	95.48	−0.85
Two-party-preferred result
Liberal	Patrick Secker	63,392	69.88	+3.25
Labor	Waluwe Simpson-Lyttle	27,322	30.12	−3.25
Liberal hold		Swing	+3.25	

==== 2001 ====
2001 Australian federal election: Barker
Party	Candidate	Votes	%	±%
Liberal	Patrick Secker	43,201	54.06	+7.20
Labor	David Detchon	18,968	23.74	+2.04
One Nation	Dona Wright	5,900	7.38	−5.62
Democrats	Louise Miller	5,504	6.89	+0.55
Greens	Matt Rigney	2,629	3.29	+3.29
Independent	Liz Ballinger	2,538	3.18	+3.18
Independent	Philip Cornish	1,167	1.46	+1.46
Total formal votes		79,907	94.50	−0.43
Informal votes		4,654	5.50	+0.43
Turnout		84,561	96.96	
Two-party-preferred result
Liberal	Patrick Secker	52,491	65.69	+1.65
Labor	David Detchon	27,416	34.31	−1.65
Liberal hold		Swing	+1.65	

=== Elections in the 1990s ===
==== 1998 ====
1998 Australian federal election: Barker
Party	Candidate	Votes	%	±%
Liberal	Patrick Secker	36,412	46.89	−15.62
Labor	David Detchon	16,844	21.69	−1.36
One Nation	Dona Wright	10,096	13.00	+13.00
Democrats	John Lavers	4,919	6.33	−3.49
Independent	Tony Beck	3,985	5.13	+5.13
Christian Democrats	Philip Cornish	2,161	2.78	+2.78
National	Tom Haig	1,746	2.25	+2.25
Independent	Bill Jerram	784	1.01	+1.01
Australia First	Judith Ludwig	713	0.92	+0.92
Total formal votes		77,660	94.92	−1.66
Informal votes		4,158	5.08	+1.66
Turnout		81,818	96.52	+1.66
Two-party-preferred result
Liberal	Patrick Secker	49,501	63.74	−7.14
Labor	David Detchon	28,159	36.26	+7.14
Liberal hold		Swing	−7.14	

==== 1996 ====
1996 Australian federal election: Barker
Party	Candidate	Votes	%	±%
Liberal	Ian McLachlan	49,204	62.51	+2.13
Labor	Leah York	18,146	23.05	−2.74
Democrats	Dennis Dorney	7,734	9.82	+3.69
Greens	Rita Helling	2,924	3.71	+3.71
Natural Law	Chris Wells	712	0.90	−1.40
Total formal votes		78,720	96.58	+0.15
Informal votes		2,786	3.42	−0.15
Turnout		81,506	96.48	−0.77
Two-party-preferred result
Liberal	Ian McLachlan	55,554	70.89	+4.91
Labor	Leah York	22,818	29.11	−4.91
Liberal hold		Swing	+4.91	

==== 1993 ====
1993 Australian federal election: Barker
Party	Candidate	Votes	%	±%
Liberal	Ian McLachlan	46,667	60.37	+2.63
Labor	Harry Early	19,939	25.79	−2.22
Democrats	Regine Andersen	4,742	6.13	−5.44
Natural Law	Chris Wells	1,784	2.31	+2.31
Call to Australia	Deidre Kent	1,548	2.00	+1.06
Independent	Francis Boylan	1,399	1.81	+1.81
Independent	Stephen Wikblom	1,221	1.58	+1.58
Total formal votes		77,300	96.44	−0.57
Informal votes		2,857	3.56	+0.57
Turnout		80,157	95.71	
Two-party-preferred result
Liberal	Ian McLachlan	50,928	65.97	+2.27
Labor	Harry Early	26,265	34.03	−2.27
Liberal hold		Swing	+2.27	

==== 1990 ====
1990 Australian federal election: Barker
Party	Candidate	Votes	%	±%
Liberal	Ian McLachlan	39,470	57.8	+5.6
Labor	Bill Hender	19,865	29.1	−4.2
Democrats	Mark Lobban	6,730	9.9	+4.3
Independent	Pieter Raams	2,211	3.2	+3.2
Total formal votes		68,276	97.0	
Informal votes		2,087	3.0	
Turnout		70,363	96.5	
Two-party-preferred result
Liberal	Ian McLachlan	43,388	63.6	+2.0
Labor	Bill Hender	24,841	36.4	−2.0
Liberal hold		Swing	+2.0	

=== Elections in the 1980s ===
==== 1987 ====
1987 Australian federal election: Barker
Party	Candidate	Votes	%	±%
Liberal	James Porter	33,296	52.2	−5.1
Labor	Bill Hender	21,221	33.3	−1.3
National	Max Vawser	3,924	6.2	+3.3
Democrats	Glenn Taylor	3,602	5.6	+0.3
Independent	Harry Pfeuffer	884	1.4	+1.4
Unite Australia	Tom Giannouklas	451	0.7	+0.7
Independent	Allan Bannister	385	0.6	+0.6
Total formal votes		63,763	93.4	
Informal votes		4,481	6.6	
Turnout		68,244	95.0	
Two-party-preferred result
Liberal	James Porter	39,273	61.6	−1.1
Labor	Bill Hender	24,448	38.4	+1.1
Liberal hold		Swing	−1.1	

==== 1984 ====
1984 Australian federal election: Barker
Party	Candidate	Votes	%	±%
Liberal	James Porter	35,429	57.3	+1.4
Labor	Jeremy Moore	21,412	34.6	+0.8
Democrats	Meg Lees	3,266	5.3	+0.1
National	Richard Jacka	1,775	2.9	−2.0
Total formal votes		61,882	92.8	
Informal votes		4,835	7.2	
Turnout		66,717	95.5	
Two-party-preferred result
Liberal	James Porter	38,763	62.6	+0.3
Labor	Jeremy Moore	23,113	37.4	−0.3
Liberal hold		Swing	+0.3	

==== 1983 ====
1983 Australian federal election: Barker
Party	Candidate	Votes	%	±%
Liberal	James Porter	42,333	57.3	−0.2
Labor	Valerie Young	23,906	32.4	+3.5
Democrats	Meg Lees	3,974	5.4	−0.2
National	Anthony Beck	3,650	4.9	−3.2
Total formal votes		73,863	97.7	
Informal votes		1,717	2.3	
Turnout		75,580	96.0	
Two-party-preferred result
Liberal	James Porter		63.8	−2.3
Labor	Valerie Young		36.2	+2.3
Liberal hold		Swing	−2.3	

==== 1980 ====
1980 Australian federal election: Barker
Party	Candidate	Votes	%	±%
Liberal	James Porter	40,445	57.5	−5.9
Labor	Norman Napper	20,323	28.9	+1.0
Democrats	Ivor Childs	3,924	5.6	−3.1
National Country	Anthony Beck	3,774	5.4	+5.4
National Country	Kim Ross	1,920	2.7	+2.7
Total formal votes		70,386	97.1	
Informal votes		2,090	2.9	
Turnout		72,476	95.8	
Two-party-preferred result
Liberal	James Porter		57.5	−5.9
Labor	Norman Napper		42.5	+5.9
Liberal hold		Swing	−5.9	

=== Elections in the 1970s ===
==== 1977 ====
1977 Australian federal election: Barker
Party	Candidate	Votes	%	±%
Liberal	James Porter	43,129	63.4	+3.9
Labor	Neil Richardson	18,968	27.9	−1.7
Democrats	Rodney Roberts	5,952	8.7	+8.7
Total formal votes		68,049	97.2	
Informal votes		1,980	2.8	
Turnout		70,029	95.4	
Two-party-preferred result
Liberal	James Porter		67.8	−0.5
Labor	Rodney Roberts		32.2	+0.5
Liberal hold		Swing	−0.5	

==== 1975 ====
1975 Australian federal election: Barker
Party	Candidate	Votes	%	±%
Liberal	James Porter	36,894	58.5	+10.0
Labor	Graham Bath	19,334	30.6	−1.6
National Country	Kenneth Williams	4,070	6.4	−5.0
Liberal Movement	Rodney Roberts	2,176	3.4	−3.1
Independent	Lily Bayly	630	1.0	+1.0
Total formal votes		63,104	98.0	
Informal votes		1,305	2.0	
Turnout		64,409	97.0	
Two-party-preferred result
Liberal	James Porter		67.3	+2.1
Labor	Graham Bath		32.7	−2.1
Liberal hold		Swing	+2.1	

==== 1974 ====
1974 Australian federal election: Barker
Party	Candidate	Votes	%	±%
Liberal	Jim Forbes	28,280	48.5	−8.4
Labor	Jim Hennessy	18,765	32.2	−7.6
Country	Malcolm Adams	6,655	11.4	+11.4
Liberal Movement	Dick Clampett	3,811	6.5	+6.5
Australia	Colyn van Reenen	542	0.9	+0.9
Independent	Arthur Strachan	228	0.4	+0.4
Total formal votes		58,281	97.4	
Informal votes		1,568	2.6	
Turnout		59,849	96.4	
Two-party-preferred result
Liberal	Jim Forbes		65.2	+5.7
Labor	Jim Hennessy		34.8	−5.7
Liberal hold		Swing	+5.7	

==== 1972 ====
1972 Australian federal election: Barker
Party	Candidate	Votes	%	±%
Liberal	Jim Forbes	29,426	56.9	−0.9
Labor	John Cornwall	20,622	39.8	−2.4
Democratic Labor	David Le Cornu	1,705	3.3	+3.3
Total formal votes		51,753	98.2	
Informal votes		928	1.8	
Turnout		52,681	97.1	
Two-party-preferred result
Liberal	Jim Forbes		59.5	+1.7
Labor	John Cornwall		40.5	−1.7
Liberal hold		Swing	+1.7	

=== Elections in the 1960s ===
==== 1969 ====
1969 Australian federal election: Barker
Party	Candidate	Votes	%	±%
Liberal	Jim Forbes	27,176	57.8	−10.5
Labor	John Cornwall	19,873	42.2	+12.1
Total formal votes		47,049	97.5	
Informal votes		1,187	2.5	
Turnout		48,236	96.9	
Liberal hold		Swing	−10.7	

==== 1966 ====
1966 Australian federal election: Barker
Party	Candidate	Votes	%	±%
Liberal	Jim Forbes	33,921	67.0	+10.2
Labor	Norman Alcock	15,923	31.4	−9.6
Communist	Don Jarrett	819	1.6	+1.6
Total formal votes		50,663	98.0	
Informal votes		1,053	2.0	
Turnout		51,716	96.9	
Two-party-preferred result
Liberal	Jim Forbes		67.2	+9.3
Labor	Norman Alcock		32.8	−9.3
Liberal hold		Swing	+9.3	

==== 1963 ====
1963 Australian federal election: Barker
Party	Candidate	Votes	%	±%
Liberal	Jim Forbes	26,547	56.8	+2.4
Labor	Norman Alcock	19,168	41.0	+1.0
Independent	Harvey Burns	1,043	2.2	+2.2
Total formal votes		46,758	98.7	
Informal votes		596	1.3	
Turnout		47,354	97.5	
Two-party-preferred result
Liberal	Jim Forbes		57.9	−0.3
Labor	Norman Alcock		42.1	+0.3
Liberal hold		Swing	−0.3	

==== 1961 ====
1961 Australian federal election: Barker
Party	Candidate	Votes	%	±%
Liberal	Jim Forbes	23,732	54.4	−5.9
Labor	Norman Alcock	17,428	40.0	+4.3
Democratic Labor	Charles Coffey	1,364	3.1	−0.9
Independent	John Gartner	1,089	2.5	+2.5
Total formal votes		43,613	97.6	
Informal votes		1,094	2.4	
Turnout		44,707	97.0	
Two-party-preferred result
Liberal	Jim Forbes		58.2	−5.3
Labor	Norman Alcock		41.8	+5.3
Liberal hold		Swing	−5.3	

=== Elections in the 1950s ===
==== 1958 ====
1958 Australian federal election: Barker
Party	Candidate	Votes	%	±%
Liberal	Jim Forbes	25,146	60.3	−7.4
Labor	Norman Alcock	14,860	35.7	+3.4
Democratic Labor	Frank Marshall	1,670	4.0	+4.0
Total formal votes		41,676	98.4	
Informal votes		1,107	2.6	
Turnout		42,783	97.3	
Two-party-preferred result
Liberal	Jim Forbes		63.5	−4.2
Labor	Norman Alcock		36.5	+4.2
Liberal hold		Swing	−4.2	

==== 1956 by-election ====
Barker by-election, 1956
Party	Candidate	Votes	%	±%
Liberal	Jim Forbes	18,471	48.7	−19.0
Labor	Ralph Dettman	14,454	38.1	+5.8
Independent Liberal	William McAnaney	2,819	7.4	+7.4
Labor (A-C)	Brian Crowe	2,207	5.8	+5.8
Total formal votes		37,951	98.0	
Informal votes		771	2.0	
Turnout		38,722	92.6	
Two-party-preferred result
Liberal	Jim Forbes	21,935	57.8	−9.9
Labor	Ralph Dettman	16,016	42.2	+9.9
Liberal hold		Swing	−9.9	

==== 1955 ====
1955 Australian federal election: Barker
Party	Candidate	Votes	%	±%
Liberal	Archie Cameron	25,993	67.7	+5.5
Labor	Ralph Dettman	12,398	32.3	−5.5
Total formal votes		38,391	96.9	
Informal votes		1,214	3.1	
Turnout		39,605	96.3	
Liberal hold		Swing	+5.5	

==== 1954 ====
1954 Australian federal election: Barker
Party	Candidate	Votes	%	±%
Liberal	Archie Cameron	27,255	62.9	+1.5
Labor	Ralph Dettman	16,107	37.1	+0.9
Total formal votes		43,362	98.4	
Informal votes		706	1.6	
Turnout		44,068	97.0	
Liberal hold		Swing	+0.2	

==== 1951 ====
1951 Australian federal election: Barker
Party	Candidate	Votes	%	±%
Liberal	Archie Cameron	25,256	61.4	−3.1
Labor	Jim Corcoran	14,880	36.2	+3.1
Independent	Charles Lloyd	528	1.3	+1.3
Independent	Frank Rieck	481	1.2	+1.2
Total formal votes		41,145	98.1	
Informal votes		794	1.9	
Turnout		41,939	97.5	
Two-party-preferred result
Liberal	Archie Cameron		62.7	−3.1
Labor	Jim Corcoran		37.3	+3.1
Liberal hold		Swing	−3.1	

=== Elections in the 1940s ===
==== 1949 ====
1949 Australian federal election: Barker
Party	Candidate	Votes	%	±%
Liberal	Archie Cameron	26,034	64.5	+11.6
Labor	John Klar	13,354	33.1	−9.6
Independent	John Gartner	1,004	2.5	+2.5
Total formal votes		40,392	98.3	
Informal votes		706	1.7	
Turnout		41,098	97.6	
Two-party-preferred result
Liberal	Archie Cameron		65.8	+10.8
Labor	John Klar		34.2	−10.8
Liberal hold		Swing	+10.8	

==== 1946 ====
1946 Australian federal election: Barker
Party	Candidate	Votes	%	±%
Liberal	Archie Cameron	34,619	54.0	+13.4
Labor	Harry Krantz	26,500	41.3	+1.3
Independent	David Eddy	2,992	4.7	+4.7
Total formal votes		64,111	97.3	
Informal votes		1,781	2.7	
Turnout		65,892	95.9	
Two-party-preferred result
Liberal	Archie Cameron		56.4	−4.7
Labor	Harry Krantz		43.6	+4.7
Liberal hold		Swing	+4.7	

==== 1943 ====
1943 Australian federal election: Barker
Party	Candidate	Votes	%	±%
United Australia	Archie Cameron	24,616	40.6	+40.6
Labor	Harry Krantz	24,240	40.0	+13.3
Independent	Frank Halleday	10,508	17.3	+17.3
Independent	John Gartner	1,222	2.0	+2.0
Total formal votes		60,586	97.1	
Informal votes		1,816	2.9	
Turnout		62,402	97.5	
Two-party-preferred result
United Australia	Archie Cameron	31,294	51.7	+51.7
Labor	Harry Krantz	29,292	48.3	+14.2
United Australia gain from Country		Swing	−14.2	

==== 1940 ====
1940 Australian federal election: Barker
Party	Candidate	Votes	%	±%
Country	Archie Cameron	34,649	58.6	−5.0
Labor	Cecil Skitch	15,786	26.7	+26.7
Independent	Charles Lloyd	8,659	14.7	−21.7
Total formal votes		59,094	96.9	
Informal votes		1,861	3.1	
Turnout		60,955	96.0	
Two-party-preferred result
Country	Archie Cameron		65.9	+2.3
Labor	Cecil Skitch		34.1	−2.3
Country hold		Swing	+2.3	

=== Elections in the 1930s ===
==== 1937 ====
1937 Australian federal election: Barker
Party	Candidate	Votes	%	±%
Country	Archie Cameron	35,559	63.6	+1.3
Independent	Charles Lloyd	20,375	36.4	+36.4
Total formal votes		55,934	95.4	
Informal votes		2,724	4.6	
Turnout		58,658	96.9	
Country hold		Swing	−5.1	

==== 1934 ====
1934 Australian federal election: Barker
Party	Candidate	Votes	%	±%
Country	Archie Cameron	32,311	62.3	+62.3
Labor	Cecil Skitch	12,923	24.9	+6.1
Social Credit	John Maycock	6,598	12.7	+12.7
Total formal votes		51,832	95.1	
Informal votes		2,684	4.9	
Turnout		54,516	95.1	
Two-party-preferred result
Country	Archie Cameron		68.7	+68.7
Labor	Cecil Skitch		31.3	+6.4
Country gain from United Australia		Swing	−6.4	

==== 1931 ====
1931 Australian federal election: Barker
Party	Candidate	Votes	%	±%
Emergency Committee	Malcolm Cameron	50,597	64.0	+12.8
Labor	Cyril Hasse	10,904	22.8	−26.0
Independent	Percy Spehr	6,291	13.2	+13.2
Total formal votes		47,792	94.5	
Informal votes		2,765	5.5	
Turnout		50,557	96.3	
Two-party-preferred result
Emergency Committee	Malcolm Cameron		70.7	+19.5
Labor	Cyril Hasse		29.3	−19.5
Emergency Committee hold		Swing	+19.5	

=== Elections in the 1920s ===
==== 1929 ====
1929 Australian federal election: Barker
Party	Candidate	Votes	%	±%
Nationalist	Malcolm Cameron	23,189	51.2	−1.4
Labor	Frank Nieass	22,067	48.8	+48.8
Total formal votes		45,256	94.9	
Informal votes		2,459	5.1	
Turnout		47,715	95.6	
Nationalist hold		Swing	−1.4	

==== 1928 ====
1928 Australian federal election: Barker
Party	Candidate	Votes	%	±%
Nationalist	Malcolm Cameron	21,883	52.6	−9.0
Country	Ronald Hunt	19,699	47.4	+47.4
Total formal votes		41,582	90.2	
Informal votes		4,523	9.8	
Turnout		46,105	95.4	
Nationalist hold		Swing	−9.0	

==== 1925 ====
1925 Australian federal election: Barker
Party	Candidate	Votes	%	±%
Nationalist	Malcolm Cameron	24,356	61.6	+61.6
Labor	Alwyn Roberts	15,209	38.4	−4.7
Total formal votes		39,565	95.2	
Informal votes		1,993	4.8	
Turnout		41,558	93.7	
Nationalist gain from Liberal		Swing	+9.3	

==== 1922 ====
1922 Australian federal election: Barker
Party	Candidate	Votes	%	±%
Labor	Eric Shepherd	8,066	43.1	+9.4
Liberal	Malcolm Cameron	7,861	42.0	+42.0
Country	Ronald Hunt	2,791	14.9	+14.9
Total formal votes		18,718	92.6	
Informal votes		1,491	7.4	
Turnout		20,209	50.2	
Two-party-preferred result
Liberal	Malcolm Cameron	9,789	52.3	+52.3
Labor	Eric Shepherd	8,929	46.7	+11.0
Liberal gain from Nationalist		Swing	−11.0	

=== Elections in the 1910s ===
==== 1919 ====
1919 Australian federal election: Barker
Party	Candidate	Votes	%	±%
Nationalist	John Livingston	13,233	60.0	−3.9
Labor	Albert Davies	7,023	31.8	−4.3
Independent	Alexander Williams	1,813	8.2	+8.2
Total formal votes		22,069	90.8	
Informal votes		2,238	9.2	
Turnout		24,307	62.3	
Two-party-preferred result
Nationalist	John Livingston		64.1	+0.2
Labor	Albert Davies		35.9	−0.2
Nationalist hold		Swing	+0.2	

==== 1917 ====
1917 Australian federal election: Barker
Party	Candidate	Votes	%	±%
Nationalist	John Livingston	16,869	63.9	+7.2
Labor	Stanley Whitford	9,522	36.1	−7.2
Total formal votes		26,391	96.6	
Informal votes		938	3.4	
Turnout		27,329	70.2	
Nationalist hold		Swing	+7.2	

==== 1914 ====
1914 Australian federal election: Barker
Party	Candidate	Votes	%	±%
Liberal	John Livingston	16,866	56.7	−2.3
Labor	William Sampson	12,876	43.3	+2.3
Total formal votes		29,742	97.3	
Informal votes		814	2.7	
Turnout		30,556	81.7	
Liberal hold		Swing	−2.3	

==== 1913 ====
1913 Australian federal election: Barker
Party	Candidate	Votes	%	±%
Liberal	John Livingston	15,590	59.0	−0.5
Labor	William Sampson	10,849	41.0	+0.5
Total formal votes		26,439	95.0	
Informal votes		1,392	5.0	
Turnout		27,831	79.7	
Liberal hold		Swing	−0.5	

==== 1910 ====
1910 Australian federal election: Barker
Party	Candidate	Votes	%	±%
Liberal	John Livingston	9,519	59.5	+1.4
Labour	Martin Dwyer	6,473	40.5	−1.4
Total formal votes		15,992	96.1	
Informal votes		642	3.9	
Turnout		16,634	55.8	
Liberal hold		Swing	+1.4	

=== Elections in the 1900s ===
==== 1906 ====
1906 Australian federal election: Barker
Party	Candidate	Votes	%	±%
Anti-Socialist	John Livingston	6,534	58.1	+58.1
Labour	Roland Campbell	4,715	41.9	+41.9
Total formal votes		11,249	95.3	
Informal votes		559	4.7	
Turnout		11,808	44.2	
Anti-Socialist gain from Protectionist		Swing	+58.1	

==== 1903 ====
1903 Australian federal election: Barker
Party	Candidate	Votes	%	±%
Protectionist	Sir Langdon Bonython	unopposed		
Protectionist win		(new seat)		
