= Gillon McLachlan =

Australian sports administrator (born 1973)

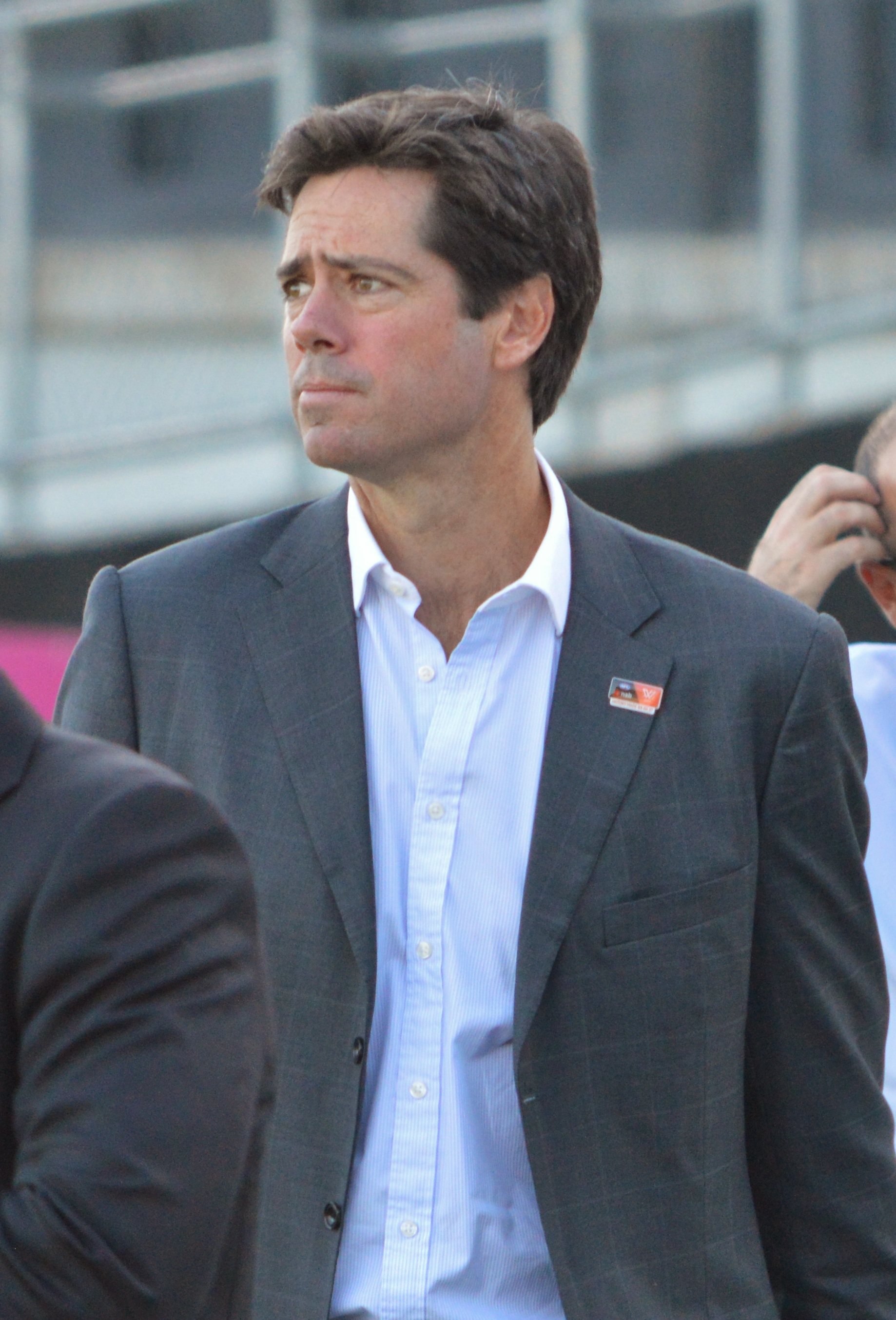
- McLachlan in February 2017

CEO of the Australian Football League
- In office 30 April 2014 – 1 October 2023
- Preceded by: Andrew Demetriou
- Succeeded by: Andrew Dillon

Personal details
- Born: 8 August 1973 (age 53) Adelaide, South Australia
- Spouse: Laura Blythe
- Children: 4
- Education: St Peter's College, Adelaide; University of Adelaide; Melbourne University

Gillon McLachlan (born 8 August 1973) is an Australian business executive who is the CEO of Tabcorp. He is the former chief executive officer of the Australian Football League (AFL). He was appointed to the role in 2014, succeeding Andrew Demetriou, having previously been his deputy, and finished his contract at the end of the 2023 season, passing the reins to Andrew Dillon.

== Early life ==
McLachlan grew up on his family farm, "Rosebank", located in Mount Pleasant, South Australia. His parents are Angus, a former first class cricketer, and Sylvia. He is the eldest of four brothers: Hamish, Will and Banjo. His uncle, Ian McLachlan, was an Australian government Minister for Defence, and was long term president (to 2014) of the South Australian Cricket Association.

== Schooling ==
After completing secondary school as a boarder at St Peter's College, Adelaide, McLachlan obtained a Bachelor of Commerce degree at the University of Adelaide in 1995 and a Bachelor of Laws (Honours) degree at the University of Melbourne in 1996, where he was a resident at Trinity College. He later completed the Senior Executive Program at Stanford University.

== Sporting career ==
McLachlan played Australian football in the Hills Football League colts competition for the now defunct Pleasant Valley club. After moving to Melbourne, he played with Melbourne University Blues in the Victorian Amateur Football Association (VAFA). Besides playing as a ruckman for the club (1994–2003), he was captain (2000–2002), was awarded the C. W. McLeod Trophy for best-and-fairest (2000), committee member and made a life member (2003).

McLachlan was a regular VAFA representative, including as captain, and was on the Carlton Football Club supplementary list from 1996 to 1997. McLachlan has represented Victoria in polo and has been a national selector.

== Business career ==
After leaving university, McLachlan worked as a management consultant with Accenture. In 2000, he was employed as a strategy consultant to the AFL by CEO Wayne Jackson. He proceeded to move up through key administrative posts at the league. In 2003, he was appointed general manager of commercial operations. In 2008, he was appointed chief operating officer.

In 2012, it was reported that McLachlan rejected the CEO positions at the National Rugby League and Liverpool F.C., before being appointed deputy CEO of the AFL in December 2012. During this time, McLachlan played a major role in delivering stadiums for two new teams (Gold Coast and Greater Western Sydney), established the AFL Media department, and negotiated the media broadcast deal of $1.25 billion. In 2013, he supervised the AFL's investigation into the Melbourne Football Club tanking scandal and the negotiations with the Essendon Football Club as part of its illegal sports supplements scandal.

On 30 April 2014, McLachlan was appointed AFL CEO, replacing Andrew Demetriou. At the announcement of his appointment, McLachlan stated: "I've been part of the community of football and I know how important it is. I played over 200 games of amateur or country football, I've captained a club, I've been on a committee of a club, I'm a life member of a club. I've had my share of cold showers and freezing committee meetings. I've been part of appointing coaches and sacking coaches. I have a clear vision of where the game needs to go and how we're going to get there. For me that vision is about having an unassailable hold on the Australian community."

In 2014, McLachlan was appointed patron of the Children's Cancer Foundation. McLachlan stated: "Australian football is built on community. We are only as strong as the community in which we reside. The Children's Cancer Foundation's values reflect the AFL's commitment to effecting positive social change." Since 2015, McLachlan has also been a member of the Million Dollar Lunch Committee.

In April 2022, McLachlan announced that he would step down from his role as AFL CEO at the end of the 2022 season, but his tenure was extended until the end of the 2023 season after the selection process for his replacement took longer than expected. He was set replaced by Andrew Dillon in October 2023.

In June 2024, McLachlan was appointed CEO of Tabcorp.

== Personal life ==
Gillon McLachlan is married to Laura Blythe, who was a fellow resident at Trinity College and is the daughter of former Spotless chairman Brian Blythe. The McLachlans have four children.

Noted Australian comedic duo Roy and HG dubbed McLachlan 'The Murderer', on account of his ruthless leadership during his tenure as CEO of the AFL.
