= Kenneth Luke =

Australian football administrator (1896–1971)

Sir Kenneth Luke CMG
- Luke in April 1944

President of the Victorian Football League
- In office 21 March 1956 – 13 June 1971
- Preceded by: William C. McClelland
- Succeeded by: Maurice Nathan

President of the Carlton Football Club
- In office 1938–1955
- Preceded by: Dave Crone
- Succeeded by: Horrie Clover

Personal details
- Born: Kenneth George Luke; 11 November 1896
- Died: 13 June 1971 (aged 74) Hawthorn, Victoria, Australia

Sir Kenneth George Luke CMG (11 November 1896 – 13 June 1971) was an Australian rules football administrator and self-made millionaire manufacturer who served as the president of the Victorian Football League (VFL) from 1956 until his death in 1971.

Luke was a member of the Carlton Football Club committee from 1935 to 1937 and Carlton President from 1938 to 1955. He also served as VFL Vice-President 1946 to 1955 and VFL President 1956 to 1971. Along with Eric McCutchan, he played a major role in the purchase of land for Waverley Park in 1962 and the development of the stadium, and its main grandstand was named in his honour.

In 1952, he founded the White Ensign Club, to provide services to sailors. He was knighted in the Queen's New Years Honours of 1962.

Sir Kenneth was inducted to the Australian Football Hall of Fame in 1996.
