= Wayne Reid =

Australian tennis player and sports administrator (1938–2021)

- Full name: Wayne Vivian Reid
- Country (sports): Australia
- Born: 12 January 1938; Melbourne, Victoria
- Died: 30 June 2021 (aged 83)
- Retired: 1967
- Plays: Right-handed

Singles
- Career titles: 0

Grand Slam singles results
- Australian Open: 3R (1961)
- Wimbledon: 2R (1958)

Doubles

Grand Slam doubles results
- Australian Open: SF (1961)
- Wimbledon: 1R (1962)

Mixed doubles

Grand Slam mixed doubles results
- Australian Open: 2R (1957)
- Wimbledon: 2R (1958, 1962)

Wayne Vivian Reid OBE (12 January 1938 – 30 June 2021) was a tennis player and sports administrator who was president of the Lawn Tennis Association of Australia (LTAA), the Melbourne Football Club, the Asian Tennis Circuit, the Confederation of Australian Sport, the International Assembly of National Confederations of Sports and was a founding director of the Australian Institute of Sport.

== Early life ==
Reid was born in Melbourne, Victoria, on 12 January 1938. Reid was educated at Wesley College in Melbourne. While at Wesley, Reid won the Victorian schoolboys singles and doubles tennis championships.

== Tennis ==
=== Player ===
Reid, a right-handed player, played his whole career as an amateur. Reid's most notable display as a player came when he defeated tennis legend Rod Laver at the South Australian Open in 1960. Reid played in the Australian Open five times, in 1958, 1959, 1961, 1965 and 1967; his best performance was reaching the third round in 1961, when he was seeded seventh. That year he also entered the doubles with Christian Kuhnke; they reached the semi-finals before being defeated by the eventual champions, Laver and Bob Mark. He travelled overseas only twice in his playing career, both times to play at Wimbledon. He reached the second round in both 1958 and 1962, losing to the eventual runner-up, Martin Mulligan, in the latter. While he was in Europe in 1958 to play at Wimbledon he also played in Spain, at the Torneo Godó, where he was knocked out in the third round by the eventual champion, Sven Davidson. Reid retired from championship tennis shortly after his 22nd birthday in order to focus on his business interests. He did, however, play in two more Australian Opens after his retirement.

=== Administrator ===
Reid became president of the Lawn Tennis Association of Australia (LTAA) in 1969, at the age of just 31. Because of his youth, Reid was able to bridge the generational gap between the officials and the players, which was considered especially important at the time, as 1969 was the first year of Open tennis. He successfully negotiated the transition from amateur to professional tennis and has been praised for his forward and progressive thinking, an example of which was the introduction of sponsorship to Australian tennis. His tenure as president is considered to be successful; he founded the Australian Davis Cup Tennis Foundation and the Asian Tennis Circuit, of which he was the inaugural chairman, and left the LTAA $367,000 better off than when he took on the presidency. Reid resigned as president in 1977.

== Australian rules football ==
Having only been elected to the Board of the Melbourne Football Club in October 1978, Reid was a surprise selection to replace the retiring John Mitchell as president of the club in November. One of the first actions of Reid's new Board was to sack coach Dennis Jones, who had been in the position for only a year. He appointed Carl Ditterich as captain-coach to replace Jones. Reid held the position of president for two years, until he resigned at the end of the 1980 season and Billy Snedden took over the presidency.

Reid was approached by five clubs to contest the 1988 election for president of the Victorian Football League, but he decided against running after learning that Allen Aylett, who became president, was intending to run.

== Further presidencies ==
He was also the inaugural president of the Confederation of Australian Sport, a position he held for eight years. In March 1981 he was elected president of the International Assembly of National Confederations of Sports, a position he also held for eight years. Reid was also a founding director of the Australian Institute of Sport and was a member of the Australian Federal Government Sports Advisory Council.

== Honours ==
Reid was made an Officer of the Order of the British Empire (OBE) for his service to tennis administration in 1977 and inducted into the Sport Australia Hall of Fame in 1989. He was also made a life member of Tennis Australia. The Wayne Reid Cup is named after Reid and is awarded for a five-day Australian under-16s event, held annually in Perth in the lead up to the Hopman Cup event.

Sporting positions
Preceded by John Mitchell	President of the Melbourne Football Club; 1979–1980	Succeeded by Billy Snedden
