= Andrew Dillon (sports administrator) =

Australian sports administrator

- Dillon in July 2026

CEO of the Australian Football League
- Incumbent
- Assumed office 1 October 2023
- Preceded by: Gillon McLachlan

Personal details
- Born: Andrew Dillon; 23 July 1970 (age 56) Victoria, Australia
- Spouse: Amanda Dillon
- Children: 3
- Education: Xavier College; Melbourne University

Andrew Dillon (born 23 July 1970) is an Australian sports administrator who has served as the chief executive officer of the Australian Football League (AFL) since October 2023.

== Early life and schooling ==
Dillon attended Xavier College in Kew. He completed a Bachelor of Commerce and Laws from University of Melbourne and Post Graduate Diploma in Applied Finance and Investment from the Securities Institute of Australia.

== Business career ==
In 1994, Dillon was employed as articled clerk at Corrs Chambers Westgarth and then became a commercial solicitor. In 1997, he was appointed in-house legal counsel at Village Roadshow. In August 2000, Dillon commenced his career at the Australian Football League as its legal counsel. In July 2004, he was promoted to AFL's General Manager of Legal and Business Affairs. In December 2011, he was appointed General Manager of National and Game Development. In 2013, he was appointed General Manager, Legal Integrity and Compliance. In 2017, game development was added to his role.

At the time of his appointment as AFL CEO-elect in May 2023, Dillon was Executive General Manager Football Operations, Legal & Integrity. He had been the AFL's General Counsel since 2011. In announcing his appointment, AFL Chairman Richard Goyder stated: "Andrew has been a key leader and voice in every decision we have made as an organisation for many years, and he brings not only experience across both elite and community football but also a key involvement in our major broadcast and partnership deals and in developing and shaping the AFL’s response to a number of key social issues."

== Sporting career ==
Dillon played for Old Xaverians Football Club in the Victorian Amateur Football League (VAFA) from 1989 to 2005. He played 290 games and was one of four players who featured in the club's six consecutive premierships between 1995 and 2000. Dillon has since been made a life member of Old Xaverians. He represented the VAFA on two occasions, was a committee member of Old Xaverians from 1998 to 2003, and was assistant coach from 2011 to 2012. Dillon also coached Kew Comets Junior Girls Football Club from 2014 to 2018.

== Personal life ==
Dillon's father John was a lawyer, eighth president of the Victorian Amateur Football League in 1984, and chairman of the Melbourne Racing Club from 2003 to 2005. He is the third of six children. Dillon's wife Amanda is the daughter of Paul Sheahan, a former Australian test cricketer, Melbourne Grammar School headmaster and president of the Melbourne Cricket Club. The Dillons have three daughters.
