= Andrew Demetriou =

Australian rules footballer, born 1961

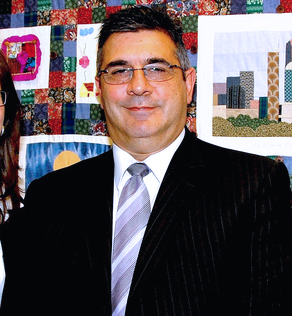

CEO of the Australian Football League
- In office 28 September 2003 – 30 April 2014
- Preceded by: Wayne Jackson
- Succeeded by: Gillon McLachlan

Personal details
- Born: Andrew Demetriou; 14 April 1961 (age 65) Melbourne, Victoria, Australia
- Spouses: Jan Bassett (died 1999) Symone Richards (m. 2002)
- Children: 4
- Education: La Trobe University

Andrew Demetriou (born 14 April 1961) is an Australian businessman, sports administrator, and former Australian rules football player who was chief executive officer (CEO) of the Australian Football League (AFL) up to June 2014. Demetriou played 103 games for the North Melbourne Football Club between 1981 and 1987, finishing his playing career with a three-game stint for Hawthorn in 1988. Chairing several companies after his retirement from playing, he was appointed CEO of the AFL Players Association in 1998, and was responsible for negotiating a new collective bargaining agreement between the league and the players. Demetriou was made CEO of the AFL in 2003, replacing Wayne Jackson. In his role as head of the AFL Commission, he was responsible for a number of changes, including the expansion of the league from 16 to 18 teams, the restructuring of the tribunal system, and the brokering of two new television rights deals.

== Early life ==
Demetriou is the youngest son of Greek Cypriot immigrants. He has an older brother Jim Demetriou who played senior football for Essendon in the mid-1970s.

He was educated at La Trobe University, where he completed a Bachelor of Arts in 1983 and a Diploma of Education in 1984. He was awarded the University's Distinguished Alumni Award in 2009 and a Doctor of Letters (honoris causa) in 2015 in recognition of his outstanding contributions to sport management and to Australian society through his leadership and support of important social issues, and currently serves as an adjunct professor.

Before becoming a VFL player, he worked in the dental import industry.

== Playing career ==
Andrew Demetriou

Personal information
- Full name: Andrew Demetriou
- Born: 14 April 1961 (age 65); Melbourne, Australia
- Original team: Pascoe Vale
- Height: 182 cm (6 ft 0 in)
- Weight: 80 kg (176 lb)
- Position: Wing

Playing career^{1}
Years	Club	Games (Goals)
1981–1987	North Melbourne	103 (47)
1988	Hawthorn	3 (1)
Total		106 (48)
- ^{1} Playing statistics correct to the end of 1988.

Recruited from Pascoe Vale, Demetriou played for the North Melbourne Football Club as a winger between 1981 and 1987, playing 103 games and kicking 47 goals.

He had a brief move to Hawthorn in 1988, but played only three games and kicked one goal.

== Administration career ==
Between 1998 and 2000, Demetriou was CEO of the AFL Players Association.

Demetriou was later appointed as AFL general manager of football operations, holding the position from May 2000 to September 2003.

Demetriou is best known for his position as CEO of the Australian Football League. He was elected by the board of directors at the end of the 2003 season, taking over from the outgoing CEO Wayne Jackson.

In 2008, Demetriou earned an annual salary of $1.4 million, making him the highest paid administrator or player then employed by the AFL.

Demetriou oversaw the league's continued national expansion with the admission of the New South Wales based Greater Western Sydney Giants and Queensland based Gold Coast Suns with a "20 to 30 years" vision for them to become "powerhouse club"s in terms of drawing support from large population bases.

In 2009, Demetriou earned $1.8 million for his role at the AFL.

== Achievements ==
In 2005 he was instrumental in securing a record breaking A$780 million TV rights deal.

In 2011, Demetriou was involved in securing a record breaking A$1.25 billion TV rights deal for the period of 2012–2016. The deal included unprecedented live TV coverage of the AFL competition in all states of Australia through free-to-air, subscription and IP television.

== Notable issues and controversies ==
=== Push for a Gold Coast–based team ===
Demetriou has been highly influential in the AFL Commission's desire for a team to be based on the Gold Coast. North Melbourne Football Club had played three home games there in 2007 and, at the conclusion of that season, Demetriou offered the club $100 million to relocate there permanently. North Melbourne rejected that offer and, in January 2008, the AFL chairman, Mike Fitzpatrick and Demetriou announced that the Gold Coast Football Club would enter the AFL in 2011.

=== Sydney Swans controversy ===
In the first half of 2005, Demetriou criticised the Sydney Swans and then-coach Paul Roos, labelling the team's play as "unattractive" and "ugly". He claimed that the Swans would not win the premiership with the way they were playing, and this statement was underlined when the team suffered a 43-point defeat to St Kilda in Round 10. This proved to be the turning point in the Swans' season, as they lost only two further home-and-away games for the season, both by single-figure margins, and eventually won the premiership.

Seven years later, Demetriou praised the Swans for their new attacking style of play under second-year coach John Longmire and rated them as serious contenders for the premiership. Sydney won the 2012 premiership implementing a style of relentless tackling and attacking play.

== Resignation ==
Demetriou announced on 3 March 2014 that he would step down from the role as AFL CEO after eleven years, at the conclusion of the 2014 AFL season.

In April 2014, it was announced that Gillon McLachlan, Demetriou's then deputy, would be his successor. Andrew finished his tenure with the AFL in June.

== Other activities ==
Demetriou has interests in factories in Brazil and India which manufacture dental products and exports them to 70 markets, including Australia.

Demetriou had a regular spot with Red Symons on Melbourne radio station ABC 774. During the 2013 Finals Series he also co-hosted Talking Footy for the Seven Network.

Demetriou in 2014 became the Chairman of the Advisory Board at Acquire Learning. Acquire Learning entered voluntary administration in May 2017, shortly after Demetriou left the company. Mr Demetriou was sued by shareholders for his part in the collapse, and contributed $360,000 to the settlement sum to stop the Court action.

In 2018, Demetriou became a director of Crown Resorts. In 2021, Demetriou resigned after Crown was found by Commissioner Patricia Bergin on behalf of the NSW Independent Liquor & Gaming Authority not to be suitable to hold a gaming licence in New South Wales and specifically found that Demetriou was someone who Crown "would be justified in lacking confidence in", calling his evidence to the inquiry "bizarre" and "unimpressive".

In 2022, Demetriou became an advisor to gambling company Betr, which is owned by YouTube personality Jake Paul.

== Personal life ==
Demetriou's first wife died in 1999. In 2002 he married his current wife Symone, and they have three daughters and a son.
