= Angus McLachlan =

Australian pastoralist and cricketer

Personal information
- Full name: Angus Alexander McLachlan
- Born: 11 November 1944 (age 82); North Adelaide, South Australia
- Batting: Right-handed
- Bowling: Right-arm leg-break and googly
- Relatives: Ian McLachlan (brother); Gillon McLachlan (son); Hamish McLachlan (son)

Domestic team information
- Years: Team
- 1964–1965: Cambridge University

Career statistics
Competition	First-class
Matches	17
Runs scored	232
Batting average	9.28
100s/50s	0/0
Top score	27
Balls bowled	2143
Wickets	32
Bowling average	37.43
5 wickets in innings	0
10 wickets in match	0
Best bowling	4/36
Catches/stumpings	8/–
- Source: CricketArchive, 21 November 2013

Angus Alexander McLachlan (born 11 November 1944) is an Australian pastoralist and former first-class cricketer.

== Cricket career ==
Like his elder brother Ian before him, McLachlan was educated at St. Peter's College, Adelaide, and Jesus College, Cambridge.

He made his first-class cricket debut for Cambridge University in his freshman year, 1964, taking 4 for 41 with "excellent leg-spin bowling" against Northamptonshire. Two games later he took 4 for 36 and 1 for 36 in an innings victory over Combined Services. He kept his place in the team for the rest of the season, playing in the annual match against Oxford University at Lord's. He finished the season with 18 wickets at 33.55.

Although his bowling "did not come up to expectations" and was "often expensive" in 1965, McLachlan played most of Cambridge's matches and once again appeared against Oxford at Lord's. His best figures were 4 for 101 against Yorkshire. He finished 1965 with 14 wickets at 42.42. In the 1966 season, the Cambridge captain, Deryck Murray, refused to allow players to play at all if they did not make themselves available for the whole season, and having devoted himself to his studies during the early weeks of the season, McLachlan was not selected for any matches.

== Pastoral career ==
In 1971, at the age of 26, McLachlan took charge of the family sheep station, Rosebank, in the Mount Pleasant area of the Adelaide Hills in South Australia. He also owned the Victorian sheep station Liewah, near Swan Hill, until 2008.

Rosebank is a prominent Merino stud. It also produces cattle, and won the Meat Standards Australia award for South Australian producer of the year for 2014-15 for its grass-fed veal cattle.

== Personal life ==
McLachlan and his wife Sylvia have four sons. Gillon (born 1973) was chief executive officer of the Australian Football League from 2014 to 2023; Hamish (born 1975) is a sports broadcaster and host with Seven Sport.
