= Gary March =

Australian inventor

Gary March is an Australian investor, the founder and former director of Concept Sports International, now known as Beyond Sportswear Limited and former president of the Richmond Football Club until 2013.

Gary took over the presidency from Clinton Casey in 2005, after being on the Richmond Board of Directors since 2002. He was replaced by Peggy O'Neal (lawyer) in late 2013.

Preceded by Clinton Casey	Richmond Football Club president 2005—	Succeeded by Incumbent
