= Alex McCracken =

Australian rules football administrator (1856–1915)

- McCracken circa 1900

President of the Victorian Football League
- In office 12 April 1897 – 28 May 1915
- Preceded by: League established
- Succeeded by: Oliver Morrice Williams (Note: Oliver Maurice Williams, a delegate to the VFL of the Melbourne University Football Club — although the club left the VFL at the end of 1914, Williams was a VFL vice-president in 1915 — was elected to succeed McCracken as VFL president in October 1915. He resigned his position in May 1917.)

Personal details
- Born: Alexander McCracken; 7 May 1856 Melbourne, Australia
- Died: 25 August 1915 (aged 59) Essendon North, Victoria
- Spouse: Mary Elizabeth Peck (m. 1884)
- Children: Alec Lindsay (1885–1959); Joy Margaret Louisa (1886–1945); Murray Robert (1888–1964); Jean Mary (1890–1983); Madge Huntington (1891–1967)
- Education: Scotch College, Melbourne

Alexander McCracken (7 May 1856 – 25 August 1915) was an Australian sports administrator who served as the inaugural president of the Victorian Football League (VFL).

== Background ==
The son of Robert McCracken (1813–1885), the brewer and first president of the Essendon Football Club, and Margaret McCracken (1831–1905), née Hannay, Alexander McCracken was born in Melbourne on 7 May 1856.

He attended Scotch College in East Melbourne from 1869 to 1871.

His brother John (1853–1879) became Essendon's first team captain, and his cousin Coiler (Note: Sometimes identified as "Coiler", sometimes as "Colyer", and sometimes as "Collier".) McCracken (1848–1915), became Essendon's second captain. (Note: According to the entry in Demonwiki, "Coiler McCracken" played for the Melbourne Football Club in 1868, 1869. 1871, 1872, and 1873, for the Melbourne University Football Club in 1865, 1868, and 1869, as well as for the Essendon Football Club in 1878.)

On 19 July 1884, McCracken married Mary Elizabeth (1863–1938), a daughter of John Murray Peck — co-founder of Cobb and Co, and vice-president of the Essendon Football Club from 1898 to 1905. They had five children.

== McCracken's Brewery ==
McCracken by David Low

He was the head of McCracken Brewery, until May 1907 when the company, along with five other brewing firms, was merged into Carlton & United Breweries Limited. He was appointed a Director of the new company.

== Football ==
Alex McCracken played a number of times for the Essendon Football Club in the four pre-VFA years (1873–1876) with his brother, John, and his cousin, Coiler, and also in the club's first season in the VFA 1877, when the team was captained by his cousin.

"The brothers McCracken, of the wealthy brewing firm, with A. Graham as treasurer, were the heart and soul of the [Essendon Football] club at the beginning. Mr. Alexander McCracken (one of the most distinguished of Victorian sportsmen) was hon. secretary, player, and later president for the greater part of his life, in spite of his racing interests, and the huge business organisation he controlled, relinquishing his official connection with the club only to assume the more important position of president of the Victorian League. This he held until just before he passed away . . ."

— The Referee, 6 August 1917.

In 2008, McCracken was inaugurated as one the ten "Legends" of the Essendon Football Club Hall of Fame.

== Organisations and associations ==
He was deeply involved in various sporting/social and commercial organisations as administrator, founder, and/or patron, including:

- First secretary of the Essendon Football Club (at the age of 17).
- First president of the Victorian Football League (VFL).
  - Elected at the VFL's first official meeting on 12 April 1897 he retired (due to ill-health) just before his death in 1915.
- President of the Essendon Literary and Debating Society.
- President of the Essendon Poultry, Dog, Pigeon and Canary Society.
- President of the Essendon Town Fire Brigade.
- President of the Brewers' Club of Melbourne.
- Founder of the Essendon Cricket Club.
- Founder and president of the Essendon Rowing Club.
- Founder of the Essendon Tennis Club.
- Founder of the Oaklands Hunt Club.
- Chairman of the Brewers' Association of Victoria (1901).
- Chairman of the Manufacturers' Bottle Co. of Victoria (1903).
- Chairman of the Liquor Trades Defence Union (1903).
- Chairman of the Royal Agricultural Society of Victoria (1909–1915).
- Vice-president of the Essendon Golf Club.
- Vice-president of the North Suburban Cycling Club.
- Vice-president of the Victorian Racing Club.
- Patron of the Essendon Bowling Club.
- Director of the Trustees Executors & Agency Co. Ltd.
- Director of the Victoria Insurance Co.

== Politics ==
In 1894 McCracken, as a Free-Trade Democratic Association candidate, stood against the incumbent MLA, Alfred Deakin, for the Victorian Legislative Assembly seat of Essendon and Flemington.

Mr. A. M'Cracken met a number of his friends yesterday at the city committee rooms, Queen Street, and promptly upon the heels of the public announcement to stand come many and cordial offers of assistance. As most of his intimate friends knew that he had no desire to oppose Mr. Deakin with whom he was personally friendly, the overtures came first from the opposite end of the district to that in which Mr. M'Cracken resides. He at first declined the request to stand, but when it was again made in more representative form and his more intimate friends reminded him that it was not a question of personal friendship but of public duty, he placed himself unreservedly in the hands of the electors, and one of the first men informed of that step was Mr. Deakin. Probably no battle in the campaign will be fought on more honourable lines than between the two chief aspirants for the Essendon seat.

— The Argus, 7 September 1894.

Soundly defeated by Deakin — "The easy win of Mr Deakin in Essendon and Flemington was somewhat of a surprise, for it was expected that Mr M'Cracken would run him much more closely than he did. [At the declaration of the poll] Mr Deakin's majority of nearly 2 to 1 was received with loud cheering." — McCracken did not attempt to enter politics ever again.

== Properties ==
The Essendon football Club was refused the use of Windy Hill and played its first few seasons (probably near Filson St) on Robert McCracken's "Ailsa". (Note: Later Mercy College; and from 2011, a Scientology centre.) (Note: When seeking admittance to the V.F.A. they had to move to the East Melbourne Ground.)

He built a mansion home called "North Park", (Note: Originally gazetted as Hawstead, the area is now known as Glenbervie. The house was built on the site of an earlier home called "North Park" built by Dugald McPhail.) now the Columban Mission, on the south side of Woodland St, Essendon. (Note: "McCracken was fiercely Presbyterian and did not want his property North Park to fall into the hands of a Catholic institution on his death. He was so adamant about this that he put a codicil in his will. On his death the property was sold to Harvey Paterson, an executive of BHP, who later sold to the Catholic St. Columban Mission.")

Alexander had a country estate called "Cumberland"; and it was, with the Inverness Hotel and Alister Clark's "Glenara", a venue for after hunt celebrations until the Oaklands Hunt Club bought "Sherwood" in Somerton Rd. After Alexander's death, the Johnsons of "Glendewar", across the creek from "Cumberland" moved into Alexander's property. (Note: The (by then abandoned) house was destroyed by fire in the 1950s; the granite remains can be seen in Woodlands Historic Park.) (Note: Coincidentally, "Cumberland" was granted to an early overlander Thomas Wills, an uncle of the founder of Australian Rules Football (Tom Wills), who codified the rules in 1866 (some say in that he did it in concert with H. C. A. Harrison).)

== Death ==
He died at his North Essendon residence, "North Park", on 25 August 1915 and was buried on 27 August in a private ceremony, at Melbourne General Cemetery.

DEATH OF MR. A. McCRACKEN.
Universal regret was expressed at the announcement of the death of Mr. A. McCracken, at his residence, North Park, Essendon, on August 25.
Until his retirement a few months ago he was connected with the League since its inception, filling the office of president from 1897 to 1915 inclusive.
It is no exaggeration to say that the League's success has been due in a great measure to his judgment, tact, and courtesy. Mr. McCracken in his young days was a keen footballer and supporter of the game.
In later years he was a generous patron, always displaying a close interest in the sport, being held in the highest esteem by footballers and the public.
The present Essendon League club first played in his father's paddock, and Mr. McCracken was the club's first secretary, and later on became president.

— Jack Worrall, 4 September 1915.
