= Oliver Morrice Williams =

Australian rules football administrator (1857–1938)

Oliver Morrice Williams OBE
- Williams in September 1919

President of the Victorian Football League
- In office 19 October 1915 – 25 May 1917
- Preceded by: Alex McCracken
- Succeeded by: Chas Brownlow (acting); Walter Baldwin Spencer

Personal details
- Born: Oliver Morrice Williams; 27 September 1857 Hobart, Tasmania, Australia
- Died: 31 July 1938 (aged 80) Toorak, Victoria, Australia
- Spouse: Sarah Kate Swallow (m. 1886)
- Education: Melbourne Grammar School

Oliver Morrice Williams OBE (27 September 1857 – 31 July 1938) was an Australian rules football administrator who served as the president of the Victorian Football League (VFL) from 1915 until 1917.

== Career ==
Williams was born in Hobart in 1857 and moved to Melbourne as a child. He attended Melbourne Grammar School before leaving to work at the Bank of Australasia. In 1891, he transferred to the London Chartered Bank of Australia and served as the bank's general manager from approximately 1909 until his retirement.

Around 1910, Williams became a delegate from the University Football Club to the board of the Victorian Football League (VFL). Although University left the VFL at the end of the 1914 season, Williams was a VFL vice-president in 1915. Following the resignation of inaugural president Alex McCracken due to ill health, (Note: Alex McCracken resigned as VFL president on 28 May 1915 and died on 25 August 1915, before Williams took office.) Williams was elected by the VFL board as the league's new president on 19 October 1915. He served in the role for less than two years before resigning on 25 May 1917, reportedly because he disagreed with the amount paid by the VFL to "patriotic funds" out of the gate receipts for Australia's World War I effort.

== Personal life ==
Williams married Sarah Kate Swallow in April 1886; the pair celebrated their 50th wedding anniversary at a reception in South Yarra in 1936. They had seven children, including five sons (Keith, Oliver, Clive, Denis and Charles) and two daughters. One son, Captain Charles Morrice Williams (1891–1917), was killed in Belgium while serving in the Australian Imperial Force during World War I.

Williams died at his home in Toorak on 31 July 1938, aged 80.
