= North Park (Melbourne) =

House in Melbourne, Victoria, Australia

- Location within Melbourne

General information
- Status: Completed
- Type: Mansion
- Architectural style: Federation Queen Anne Revival
- Location: 69 Woodland Street, Essendon, Melbourne, Victoria, Australia
- Coordinates: 37°44′37″S 144°55′25″E
- Completed: 1888; 138 years ago
- Cost: £10,750
- Client: Alex McCracken and family
- Owner: Missionary Society of St. Columban (since 1923)

Technical details
- Material: Red brick; timber; Marseilles terracotta roof tiles; sandstone; basalt; stained glass
- Size: 42 rooms
- Floor count: 2
- Grounds: c.2 ha (4.9 acres)

Design and construction
- Architect: Henry Kemp
- Architecture firm: Oakden, Addison & Kemp
- Main contractor: D. Sinclair

Victorian Heritage Register
- Official name: North Park
- Type: Registered place
- Designated: 9 January 1997
- Reference no.: H1286
- Heritage overlay no.: H128
- Categories: Parks, Gardens and Trees; Religion; Residential buildings (private)

Register of the National Estate
- Official name: North Park (former)
- Type: Defunct list
- Designated: undated
- Reference no.: 14955

North Park is a former mansion and, since 1923, Australian headquarters for a Catholic religious order. The former mansion is located at 69 Woodland Street, Essendon, an inner-western suburb of Melbourne, in Victoria, Australia.

Completed in 1888, the former mansion was added to the Victorian Heritage Register on 9 January 1997 in recognition of its architectural, historic, and aesthetic importance, and was added to the non-statutory and now defunct Register of the National Estate on an unknown date.

== History ==
North Park, now known as the Australian headquarters of the Missionary Society of St. Columban, was the home of Alex McCracken, a renowned brewer and sportsman. In 1907, the McCracken family company was merged with other companies to form Carlton & United Breweries Limited. McCracken was also a founder, secretary and then president of the Essendon Football Club, the inaugural president of the Victorian Football League, a chairman of the Royal Agricultural Society of Victoria, a chairman of the Victorian Racing Club, and involved with numerous other organisations. The mansion was often the location for social events. McCracken died in 1915 and his widow, Mary Elizabeth, inherited the mansion.

North Park was sold in 1920 for an undisclosed sum, believed to have been acquired by Harvey Patterson, (Note: His full name was Daniel Whittle Harvey Patterson; sometimes incorrectly spelled as Paterson.) a former director and chairman of BHP Limited. Three years later, North Park was acquired by the Missionary Society of St. Columban and repurposed as their Australian headquarters and monastery/seminary. The Society also acquired the nearby "Rosebank" estate as a convent for the Sisters of Charity. The sites were acquired for A£26,500 and totalled approximately 11 hectares (26 acres), on both sides of Woodland Street, from Napier Street to the Crossway, and included the grounds of what became the St Vincent de Paul Church and school during the 1930s.

The St. Columban Missionary Society made several modifications to the North Park mansion. A new wing was added to the house in 1966, and a new office building replaced the original stables in 1968. The former ballroom was converted into a chapel. In 2020, the St. Columban Missionary Society proposed to subdivide the 2-hectare (4.9-acre) estate and sell the former mansion, however it faced significant community opposition.

== Description ==
The 42-roomed mansion was built in 1888 by D. Sinclair for the cost of £10,750 to the design of Henry Kemp of the prominent Victorian architectural firm of Oakden, Addison & Kemp. In the tradition of the baronial mansions of wealthy British industrialists, the residence was built to symbolise its McCracken's prosperity and achievements.

The large, two-storey, picturesque residence is set on the highest point of Essendon and anticipates the popular Federation Queen Anne Revival style in its use of red brick for walls, half-timbering with roughcast in the gables, orange terracotta tiles, ornamental bargeboards, decorative finials and chimneys, and ornate glazing. Three ornately carved chairs survive from the furniture which was designed to complement the elaborate interior. A spacious ballroom was added to the ground floor in the early years of this century which now serves as a chapel. A new wing was added to the house in 1966, and a new office building replaced the original stables in 1968. The coach house was retained except for a small section on the south side.

The former North Park is architecturally important in demonstrating a high degree of creative achievement, being a pioneering example of the Queen Anne Revival domestic architecture in Australia. This style became the dominant expression in Australian domestic architecture in the decades immediately before and after 1900. The house is architecturally important for its use of imported Marseilles terracotta roof tiles in possibly their first application in Australia. Made in France, the unique tiles feature the signature bee imprint of the manufacturer. The interior is architecturally important for its rich decoration including multi-coloured pressed metal ceilings, plaster friezes, timber panelling, encaustic tiling and elaborate stained and coloured glass. Other important extant detail includes ornate door knobs and push plates, and gas light hardware. Three ornately carved chairs in the entrance hall dating from the McCracken ownership are important for their continued association with the house.

The grounds of North Park are of aesthetic importance as an outstanding example of the gardenesque style and for the unusual three curved terraces, wide drive, garden path remains, and the evergreen trees and large conifers which contribute to the picturesque profile of the overall composition. The circular fish pond (disused) with its central figurine fountain and random rubble base is of unusual design and an important garden element now uncommon in Victoria. The location of this structure opposite the ballroom bay window is an important design feature. The cast iron gates, fence and hand gate supported by dressed bluestone are of an outstanding design, with particularly large spears and large scale iron members. The coach house and gardener's shed are important contributions to the interpretation of a late nineteenth century large house and garden.

== See also ==
- Architecture of Melbourne
- List of places on the Victorian Heritage Register in the City of Moonee Valley
