= Ian McLachlan =

Australian politician

The Honourable Ian McLachlan AO
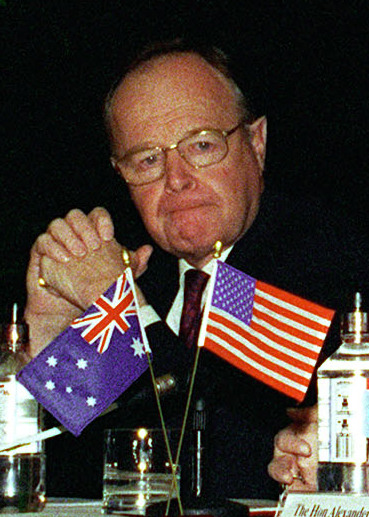
- McLachlan in 1998

Minister for Defence
- In office 11 March 1996 – 21 October 1998
- Prime Minister: John Howard
- Preceded by: Robert Ray
- Succeeded by: John Moore

Member of the Australian Parliament for Barker
- In office 24 March 1990 – 31 August 1998
- Preceded by: James Porter
- Succeeded by: Patrick Secker

Personal details
- Born: 2 October 1936 (age 90) North Adelaide, South Australia, Australia
- Party: Liberal

Ian Murray McLachlan AO (born 2 October 1936) is a former Australian politician who served as a member of the House of Representatives from 1990 to 1998, representing the Liberal Party. He was Minister for Defence in the Howard government from 1996 to 1998. Before entering politics, he served as president of the National Farmers Federation from 1984 to 1988. He played first-class cricket as a youth.

== Early life ==
Born in North Adelaide, McLachlan was educated at St. Peter's College, Adelaide, where he first displayed his cricketing prowess, and Jesus College, Cambridge.

He played 72 matches of first-class cricket for Cambridge University and South Australia between 1956 and 1964, scoring 3743 runs at an average of 31.72, with 9 centuries while completing his bachelor and masters in Law.

== Professional life ==
His business career includes managing director of Nangwarry Pastoral Co. Pty. Ltd., deputy chairman of SA Brewing Pty. Ltd (1983–1990), director of Elders IXL Ltd. (1980–1990) and president of the National Farmers Federation (1984–1988). He was made an Officer of the Order of Australia (AO) in January 1989 for "service to primary industry". He was a long term president (till 2014) of the South Australian Cricket Association.

Ian McLachlan
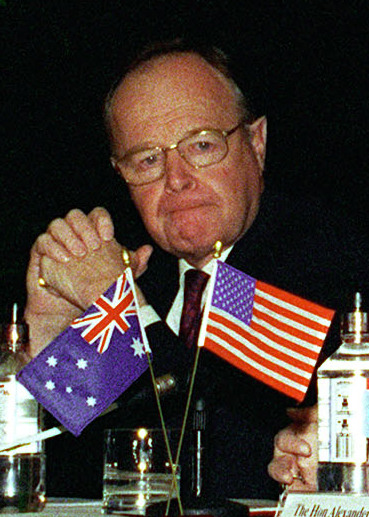

Personal information
- Batting: Right-handed
- Bowling: Right-arm leg-spin
- Relatives: Brother, Angus McLachlan; Nephew, Gillon McLachlan; Nephew, Hamish McLachlan

Domestic team information
- Years: Team
- 1956–1958: Cambridge University
- 1960/61–1963/64: South Australia

Career statistics
Competition	First-class
Matches	72
Runs scored	3,743
Batting average	31.72
100s/50s	9/17
Top score	188*
Balls bowled	606
Wickets	6
Bowling average	63.66
5 wickets in innings	0
10 wickets in match	0
Best bowling	2/33
Catches/stumpings	40/–
- Source: CricketArchive, 16 November 2013

== Political life ==
McLachlan was the member for Barker from 1990 until 1998 when he retired. He was Federal Minister for Defence from 1996 to 1998.

There was an earlier attempt to get McLachlan into Parliament in the lead-up to the 1987 election. According to John Howard, then Opposition Leader, stated in 2014 that Liberal MP Alexander Downer had offered to stand aside from his seat of Mayo in favour of McLachlan but the offer was declined.

It was revealed in 2006 that McLachlan was present at a meeting between John Howard and Peter Costello, arranging a handover of power after one and a half terms if Howard was allowed to become opposition leader without challenge, and then won office from the Australian Labor Party (ALP). Howard later reneged on this deal, leading to controversy and public bickering between Prime Minister Howard and Treasurer Costello. The revelation was made by McLachlan himself and Howard later said in The Howard Years documentary series that he had decided to hand over the prime ministership to Costello in 2006 but changed his mind as a result of the revelation of the deal.

Political offices
Preceded by Robert Ray	Minister for Defence; 1996–1998	Succeeded by John Moore
Parliament of Australia
Preceded by James Porter	Member for Barker; 1990–1998	Succeeded by Patrick Secker
