= James Porter (Australian politician) =

Australian politician

James Porter OAM
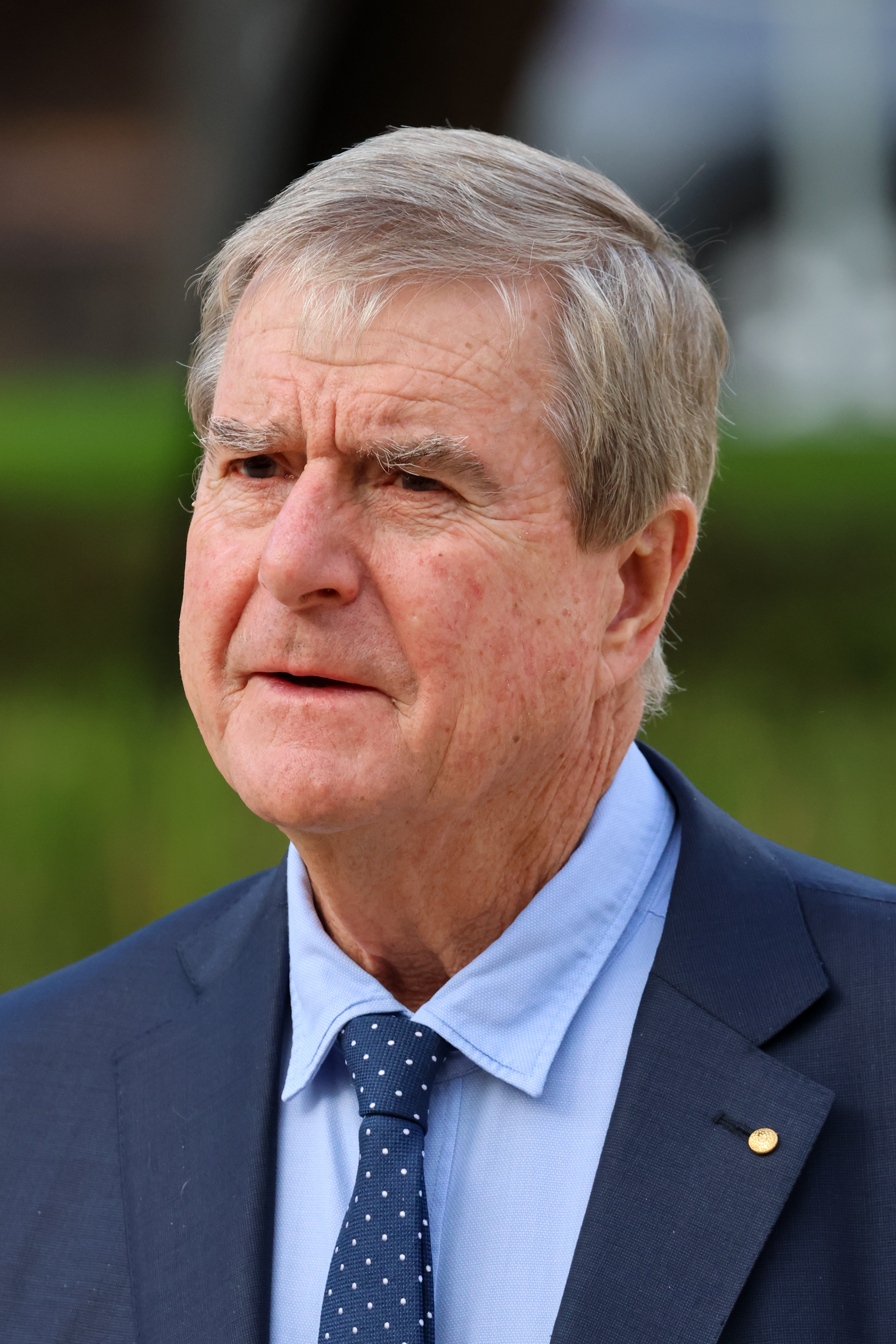
- Porter at the Adelaide Festival Centre in 2026

Member of the Australian Parliament for Barker
- In office 13 December 1975 – 19 February 1990
- Preceded by: Jim Forbes
- Succeeded by: Ian McLachlan

Personal details
- Born: 19 February 1950 (age 76) Adelaide, South Australia
- Party: Liberal Party of Australia

James Robert Porter OAM (born 19 February 1950) is an Australian politician. He was a Liberal Party of Australia member of the Australian House of Representatives from 1975 to 1990, representing the regional South Australian seat of Barker.

Porter was born in Adelaide into a wealthy establishment family, and studied law and economics at the University of Adelaide. He became a barrister and solicitor, as well as managing a large rural property owned by his family in the south-east of the state, where his family had large holdings. He also served as a lieutenant in the army reserve.

Porter was elected to the House of Representatives in the Liberal victory at the 1975 federal election. He was promoted to the shadow ministry after the Liberal government was defeated at the 1983 election and served as opposition spokesperson for a succession of portfolios including Aboriginal affairs (1983-1984), health (1984-1987), family and community services and social security (1987) and housing and public administration (1987-1988). He was praised by conservatives for his performance in Aboriginal affairs at a time when the Labor government faced challenges relating to native title and was later credited with leading the opposition's attack on the controversial Australia Card proposal. In 1987, he was briefly raised as a potential candidate for deputy leader of the party. However, he was downgraded to shadow parliamentary secretary to the Leader of the Opposition in his last two years from 1989 to 1990.

In June 1989 Porter was resoundingly defeated for Liberal preselection to recontest his seat at the 1990 federal election by Ian McLachlan, the high-profile and ambitious former president of the National Farmers' Federation. He faced strong pressure to resign immediately to allow McLachlan to enter parliament at a by-election, with rumours that he would be offered another position such as High Commissioner in London so that he would resign, but refused and remained until the 1990 election.

Porter was elected as a vice-president of the state branch of the Liberal Party in August 1989 while still an MP. In 1992, he narrowly lost a bitter battle for the state presidency of the party to Vickie Chapman amidst infighting between the "wet" and "dry" factions of the party.

== Notes ==
Parliament of Australia
Preceded by Jim Forbes	Member for Barker; 1975–1990	Succeeded by Ian McLachlan
