= Basil Collins =

Australian rules footballer

Personal information
- Full name: Basil Noel Marcus Collins
- Born: 11 June 1891; Geelong, Victoria
- Died: 3 February 1946 (aged 54); Geelong, Victoria
- Height: 185 cm (6 ft 1 in)
- Weight: 73 kg (161 lb)
- Position: Wing

Playing career^{1}
Years	Club	Games (Goals)
1910–1912, 1914–1915, 1917–1921	Geelong	62 (10)
- ^{1} Playing statistics correct to the end of 1921.

Basil Noel Marcus Collins (11 June 1891 – 3 February 1946) was an Australian rules footballer who played for the Geelong Football Club in the Victorian Football League (VFL).

Educated at Geelong College, Kyneton Grammar School, and Box Hill Grammar School, Collins football career with Geelong began in 1910 and ended in 1921 after playing 62 matches. He would also represent the VFL once. He held a number of off-field roles with the club, including serving as club president from 1940–1945, part of the time Geelong were forced to withdraw from the competition due to World War II.

Collins was part of a family dynasty that owned and operated wool manufacturing mills in the Geelong area.
