= John Mitchell (administrator) =

John Robert Mitchell is a former president of the Melbourne Football Club and the Melbourne Cricket Club.

== Melbourne Football Club ==
Mitchell became president of the Melbourne Football Club at the end of 1974, replacing the retiring Donald Duffy. He served for four years, during which time Melbourne's best result was to finish sixth. Mitchell retired at the end of the 1978 season, after the Demons finished on the bottom of the ladder, citing business and family reasons. He was succeeded as president by Wayne Reid.

In early 2000, Mitchell was one of nine people chosen to select the Melbourne Football Club Team of the Century.

== Melbourne Cricket Club ==
Mitchell was elected to the committee of the Melbourne Cricket Club on 27 February 1972. Mitchell was then elected vice-president on 21 August 1985, under the presidency of Don Cordner. When Cordner retired as president in 1992, Cordner nominated Mitchell for the role of president. Mitchell became president on 20 October 1992 and served until he retired on 18 November 1997. He was succeeded as president by R. Bruce Church.

Mitchell was made an honorary life member of the Melbourne Cricket Club in 1998.

Sporting positions
Preceded by Donald Duffy	President of the Melbourne Football Club; 1975–1978	Succeeded by Wayne Reid
