= Donald Duffy =

Australian doctor and sports administrator

Donald Grant Duffy (1 January 1915 – 16 January 1995) was an Australian medical doctor and surgeon. He served in the Australian Army in World War II and was a president of the Melbourne Football Club.

== Early life ==
Duffy was born in Mourilyan in northern Queensland on 1 January 1915, to Leontine Joseph Duffy and Bessie Rose Grant. Leontine was a manager of Australian Sugar. Donald was one of three children, all of whom ended up working in the field of medicine; his brother, Douglas, was a urologist and his sister, Dorothy, was a nurse.

== Schooling ==
Although born in Queensland, Duffy was educated at The Geelong College in Victoria. He then went on to study medicine at Ormond College, University of Melbourne, graduating with a Bachelor of Medicine, Bachelor of Surgery (MBBS) in 1938. Duffy achieved his Doctor of Medicine (MD), also from the University of Melbourne, in 1945.

== World War II ==
Duffy enlisted to the Australian Military Forces, the forerunner to the Australian Army Reserve, as part of the Second Australian Imperial Force, on 13 May 1940 in Caulfield, Victoria. He was posted to the 2/14 Battalion as the regimental medical officer. He served in the Middle East, Syria and New Guinea and in the Kokoda Track campaign, which was vital in stopping the Japanese invasion of Australia. In 1942 Duffy was promoted to the rank of major and on 23 December 1943 he was mentioned in dispatches, in the London Gazette and the Commonwealth of Australia Gazette, for "Gallant & distinguished services S.W.P. Area". Duffy was discharged on 8 May 1946.

== Medical career ==
Once discharge from the Army, and having earned his MD the previous year, Duffy was awarded a Nuffield Dominion Travelling Fellowship, which took him to London, where he worked with Professor Clifford Wilson in experimental studies on hypertension and nephritis. After his fellowship, Duffy returned to Melbourne and worked at the Alfred Hospital, the Austin Hospital, and the Repatriation General Hospital, Heidelberg. He worked as a MacKeddie Research Fellow at the Baker Medical Research Institute for four years, where his work was concerned hypertension and renal disease.

Duffy became Sub-Dean and, later, Dean of the Clinical School, at the Alfred Hospital and was instrumental in obtaining funds for the first commercially built Renal Dialysis Unit used in the hospital. At the Austin Hospital, Duffy, along with Keith Bradley and Tom Patrick, was responsible for creating the Spinal Unit.

Duffy became a member of the Royal Australasian College of Physicians (RACP), upon receiving his MD in 1945 and he became a fellow of the RACP in 1954. He served on the Victorian State Committee of the RACP from 1958 to 1964. Duffy was also a member of the Australian Rheumatism Association, the Cardiac Society of Australia and New Zealand, and the Australasian Society of Nephrology.

== Melbourne Football Club ==
Duffy began his association with the Melbourne Football Club when he became the club's medical officer in 1951, a role which he kept for many years. He also served on the board of the club and, when long-serving president Sir Albert Chadwick stepped down in 1963, Duffy assumed the presidency. In his second season as president the Demons won their sixth premiership in ten seasons, all of which were coached by the legendary Norm Smith, but their first under Duffy's presidency. This was, however, to be the peak of Duffy's 12 years as president, with arguably the lowest moment coming only a year later. Having lost star player Ron Barassi during the off-season and many other premiership players retiring, the Demons were not the team they once were, though they still won the first eight games of the season. However, in round 9 Melbourne lost to St Kilda by ten goals, which was the worst loss of Smith's coaching career and when the Demons then lost two of their next three games Duffy and his board made the decision to sack Smith, who later went on to be named AFL Coach of the Century. This caused a sensation, occupying the front and back pages of one of Melbourne's main newspapers, The Sun News-Pictorial, and occupying the first three pages of the other, The Age. After a severe public backlash to the decision, Smith was reinstated as coach by the board the very next day, which was again front-page news. Smith and Duffy were pictured, shaking hands, and Smith declared that "I think we will see Melbourne more united than ever". This was not to be the case as the Demons did not make the finals again until 1987. Duffy resigned as president at the end of 1974, and was succeeded by John Mitchell.

Duffy also served on the committee of the Melbourne Cricket Club. Nominated by Ivor Warne-Smith, Duffy was elected to the committee on 26 August 1960 and, after 26 years of service, resigned on 1 January 1987.

== Personal life ==
Described as a "tall, handsome and athletic man", Duffy married Mary Hazel Colebatch on 26 June 1943. Mary was a physiotherapist who served overseas with the Australian military forces during World War II and the sister of prominent paediatrician, John Colebatch. The Duffys had five children:

- Jennifer, a physiotherapist
- Donald Jr., a solicitor
- Ian, a barrister
- Stuart, a dentist
- Andrew, an executive with Telstra

Duffy's hobbies included squash, bush walking and surfing.

Duffy died on 16 January 1995, from cerebral metastases, aged 80.
