= Wayne Jackson (footballer) =

Australian rules footballer (born 1944)

Personal information
- Born: 16 April 1944 (age 82)
- Original team: Adelaide University (SAAFL)

Playing career^{1}
Years	Club	Games (Goals)
1965–1971	West Torrens	71 (3)
- ^{1} Playing statistics correct to the end of 1971.

Wayne R. Jackson (born 16 April 1944) is a former Australian rules footballer, best known for his tenure as the CEO of the Australian Football League (AFL) from 1996 to 2003.

Jackson attended Prince Alfred College and completed a Bachelor of Economics at the University of Adelaide, where he played for Adelaide University Football Club in the South Australian Amateur Football League (SAAFL) from 1962–64.

== SANFL ==
Jackson played 71 games for West Torrens Football Club in the South Australian National Football League (SANFL) from 1965 to 1971 before coaching the West Torrens reserves team in 1972 and the West Torrens senior and reserves teams in 1974.

In 1975, Jackson was appointed Chairman of West Torrens, and served as a SANFL League Director for West Torrens from 1975–1979, before becoming President of West Torrens in 1979, member of the SANFL Player Retention Committee from 1988–1992 and member of the SANFL Football Commission from 1991–1994.

== AFL ==
Jackson became a Member of the AFL Commission in 1995, then took over the role of CEO in 1996.

In his time as CEO of the AFL during the 1990s, Jackson continued the expansion of the game into a national competition, initially started by Allen Aylett during the 1970s. He was a strong champion of the sixteen-team competition and, during his tenure at the AFL, supported then struggling clubs the Western Bulldogs and Kangaroos with several million dollars being made available from various redistributions of AFL monies which became known as the "Competitive Balance Fund".

He presided over the $500 million television rights deal in 2001 that saw coverage move from the Seven Network to the partnership of Nine Network, Network Ten and Foxtel (Fox Footy Channel). It was also during this period that the AFL sold off the former VFL/AFL headquarters of Waverley Park.

Jackson announced on 15 April 2003 that he would be leaving the role at the end of the season, handing the reins to Andrew Demetriou. The following year he was appointed to the Northern Territory Football League (NTFL) Board.

== Football achievements summary ==
- Twice All-Australian University Amateur Footballer
- Life Member of West Torrens 1979
- Member of the South Australian Football Hall of Fame (inducted 2004)

== Other ==
Jackson completed a Management Development Program at the Harvard Business School. He has worked in several positions, including managing director of Thomas Hardy & Sons Pty Limited, General Manager and Director of BRL Hardy Limited and managing director of The South Australian Brewing Company Pty Limited.
