= William C. McClelland =

William C. McClelland CBE
- McClelland in July 1928

Personal information
- Full name: William Caldwell McClelland
- Born: 9 February 1875; Buninyong, Victoria
- Died: 30 May 1957 (aged 82); Brighton, Victoria
- Original team: Brighton Grammar
- Position: Defender

Playing career^{1}
| Years | Club | Games (Goals) |
| 1894 | Melbourne (VFA) | 16 (8) |
| 1898–1904 | Melbourne | 75 (3) |
| Total | | 91 (11) |

Representative team honours^{2}
| Years | Team | Games (Goals) |
| 1901 | Victoria | ? (?) |
- ^{1} Playing statistics correct to the end of 1904.^{2} Representative statistics correct as of 1901.

Career highlights
- VFL premiership player: 1900; Melbourne captain: 1901–1904; Australian Football Hall of Fame; Melbourne Hall of Fame

William Caldwell McClelland CBE (9 February 1875 – 30 May 1957) was a medical doctor and an Australian rules football player and administrator. Born at Buninyong, on Victoria's goldfields, to an Irish-born father (David) and his Victorian-born wife (Mary), McClelland went to Brighton Grammar School and then to the University of Melbourne where he was resident at Ormond College. He graduated BA in 1899, MA in 1901 and MB, BS in 1905.

== Playing career ==
He joined the Melbourne Football Club in 1894, but due to injury and medical studies, could not hold a place in the lineup until 1898, and became known as an often brilliant centre half-back. He played in the club's surprise 1900 premiership triumph and was elected as captain the following year, a position he filled for four seasons. Retiring at the end of the 1904 season with a total of 91 games to his credit, McClelland focused his energies on his medical career and he was medical officer to the Brighton City Council for more than four decades.

== Administrator ==
Following his retirement as a player, McClelland served as the delegate for the Melbourne Football Club on the Victorian Football League (VFL) Board of Directors, and became president of the club in 1912, serving in that role until he resigned after being elected as VFL president in 1926, succeeding Baldwin Spencer.

He served in this capacity for 30 years, and from 1944 was also the president of the Melbourne Cricket Club, thus simultaneously holding the two highest profile sporting positions in Victoria for 12 years. He was appointed a Commander of the Order of the British Empire (CBE) for services to sport in Australia in the 1955 Birthday Honours.

In 1956, at the age of 81, he handed over the leadership of the VFL to Carlton President Kenneth Luke, who was a more vocal opponent of the hold exerted by cricket clubs over the finances of VFL clubs. McClelland continued as president of the MCC until he died in 1957.

McClelland was inducted into the Australian Football Hall of Fame as an administrator in 1996. His citation read:

Cool, level-headed defender for Melbourne who was club president for 14 years before becoming VFL president from 1926 to 1955.

== Trophy ==
In 1951, the VFL instituted the McClelland Trophy, which was originally awarded to the club with the highest aggregate points across the three VFL grades (seniors, Reserves and Under-19s) at the end of the home-and-away season. With the transition to a national competition, the league was renamed the Australian Football League in 1990.

After the AFL announced the Under-19s competition would be shut down at the end of the 1991 season, to be replaced with a new Under-18s competition (the TAC Cup) featuring teams that were unaffiliated with the AFL clubs, the criteria for the McClelland Trophy was changed: from 1991 to 2022, it was awarded to the team finishing first on the ladder at the end of the home-and-away season, thus merging the Trophy with the minor premiership.

At the end of the 1999 season, the AFL Reserves competition was shut down in favour of alignments with, or stand-alone teams in, the Victorian Football League and other state leagues.

In March 2023, the AFL Commission announced it had approved a proposal to incorporate the results of the AFL Women's (AFLW) competition into the awarding of the Trophy, thus bringing an end to the 1991 format.

From 2023 onwards, the Trophy will be presented to the club with the highest aggregate points across the home-and-away seasons of both the AFL and AFLW, with the winning club also being awarded $1 million prize money.
