= Harry Dolphin =

Australian rules footballer

Personal information
- Full name: James Henry Dolphin
- Born: 28 August 1918; Moonee Ponds, Victoria
- Died: 20 July 2006 (aged 87)
- Original team: Sixth Melbourne Scouts
- Height: 183 cm (6 ft 0 in)
- Weight: 81 kg (179 lb)

Playing career^{1}
Years	Club	Games (Goals)
1940, 1942	Footscray	15 (0)
- ^{1} Playing statistics correct to the end of 1942.

James Henry Dolphin OBE (28 August 1918 – 20 July 2006) was an Australian rules footballer who played with Footscray in the Victorian Football League (VFL).

After playing for Footscray, Dolphin enlisted in the Australian Army and served in World War II.
