= Dave Crone =

Australian rules footballer

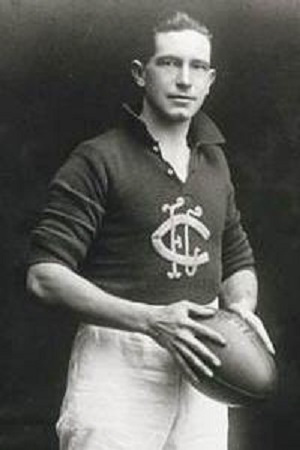
- Crone during his Carlton career

Personal information
- Full name: David Henry Crone
- Born: 2 May 1893; Donald, Victoria
- Died: 2 November 1959 (aged 64); Bruthen, Victoria
- Original team: South Ballarat
- Height: 180 cm (5 ft 11 in)
- Weight: 76 kg (168 lb)

Playing career^{1}
Years	Club	Games (Goals)
1915	Fitzroy	3 (1)
1917–1920	Carlton	22 (4)
Total		25 (5)
- ^{1} Playing statistics correct to the end of 1920.

David Henry Crone (2 May 1893 – 2 November 1959) was an Australian rules footballer who played with Fitzroy and Carlton in the Victorian Football League (VFL).
