= Allen Aylett =

Australian rules footballer and administrator (1934–2022)

Allen Aylett OBE
- Trading card of Aylett in 1954

President of the Victorian Football League
- In office c. 1 June 1977 – 5 December 1984
- Preceded by: Maurice Nathan
- Succeeded by: Jack Hamilton

President of the National Football League
- In office 1978 – 4 October 1985
- Preceded by: Ray Kutcher
- Succeeded by: Vince Yovich

President of the North Melbourne Football Club (known as Kangaroos from 1999–2007)
- In office 2001–2005
- Preceded by: Andrew Carter
- Succeeded by: Graham Duff
- In office 1971–1977
- Preceded by: Tony Trainor
- Succeeded by: Lloyd Holyoak

Personal details
- Born: Allen James Aylett; 24 April 1934 Melbourne, Victoria, Australia
- Died: 16 September 2022 (aged 88)
Australian rules football career
Personal information
- Nickname: Mick
- Original team: University High
- Height: 174 cm (5 ft 9 in)
- Weight: 80 kg (176 lb)
Playing career
Years	Club	Games (Goals)
1952–1964	North Melbourne	220 (311)

Allen James Aylett OBE (24 April 1934 – 16 September 2022) was an Australian rules football player and administrator.

As president of the then-Victorian Football League (VFL) from 1977 to 1984, he oversaw the competition's first expansion outside Victoria into the Sydney market with the relocation of South Melbourne to become the Sydney Swans, ultimately paving the way for the VFL to become a national competition. He was inducted into the Sport Australia Hall of Fame in 2006.

== Early life ==
Aylett was born in Melbourne on 24 April 1934. He attended University High School in his hometown. He made his debut for North Melbourne at the age of 17 while he was still in secondary school, a rare feat at the time.

== Playing career ==
It was as an Australian rules football rover that Aylett first made his mark. He played 220 games and kicked 311 goals, in a career spanning 1952–1964. He won North Melbourne's best and fairest award from 1958 to 1960, was All-Australian in 1958 and 1961, won the Tassie Medal in 1958 (the first player from Victoria to win), won the Simpson Medal in 1960, and was captain of his side from 1961 to 1964. He was selected in the North Melbourne Football Club's Team of the Century.

Aylett also had a brief cricketing career that he never fully pursued due to his interest in Australian rules football. He played as a batsman in 11 first-class matches in the 1950s for domestic cricket side Victoria but was not successful, finishing with a batting average of just 16. He played district cricket for Carlton (two seasons) and University (six seasons), averaging 27.

== Administration career ==
Aylett is best known for his career as an administrator in the 1970s and 1980s. He was elected to the position of North Melbourne Football Club president in 1971, and his innovative off-field leadership in securing sponsorship and running corporate entertainment – including the rise of the North Melbourne Grand Final Breakfast as one of the Grand Final's most prominent events – followed by his aggressive recruitment of star players, particularly through the use of the short-lived "ten-year rule" in 1973, turned North Melbourne from perennial also-rans to a professionally run powerhouse of the 1970s, and the club contested five consecutive Grand Finals between 1974 and 1978, winning the 1975 and 1977 games.

Aylett was elected president of the VFL in 1977. He continued his aggressive efforts to push the game's administration towards professional and business-driven success. His actions in setting up the VFL's Night Series in 1977, as a direct rival to the NFL's Night Series, delivered both sponsorship opportunities and laid the platform for the VFL to supersede the NFL for control of football in Australia. Under his guidance, the league expanded into the Sydney market, making preparations for an expansion team before South Melbourne opted to relocate there; Aylett subsequently sat on the Swans' board of directors. Additionally, during his tenure, the VFL began to establish regular Sunday matches in Victoria; and he fought the Melbourne Cricket Club and the Victorian Government to move the Grand Final to VFL Park, ultimately failing to make the move, but securing a better financial deal for the VFL and better ticket access for VFL members. Aylett stepped down in December 1984 following the establishment of the VFL Commission. Aylett also served as president of the National Football League from 1978 until 1985. He subsequently returned for a second and final stint as North Melbourne Kangaroos president from 2001 to 2005.

== Honours ==
In the 1979 Birthday Honours, Aylett was appointed an Officer of the Order of the British Empire (OBE) for services to Australian rules football. On 24 October 2000, he was awarded the Australian Sports Medal for his contribution to Australian Football. On 1 January 2001, he was awarded the Centenary Medal for service to Australian society through the sport of AFL football. He was inducted into the Sport Australia Hall of Fame as an administrator in 2006.

== Later life ==
Aylett worked as a dentist throughout his career and into his eighties.

Aylett was married to Marjorie "Marj" Wapet for 71 years until his death. They met while studying at University High together. Together, they had four children: Tony, Rick, Julie and Sam along with 8 grandchildren and 5 great-grandchildren.

Aylett died on 16 September 2022 at the age of 88.

== See also ==
- List of Victoria first-class cricketers
