= List of Fitzroy Football Club players =

This is a complete list of players to have represented the Fitzroy Football Club in the Victorian/Australian Football League.

Players are listed by the date of their VFL/AFL debut with the club. In cases of players debuting in the same game, they are listed alphabetically.

Key
Order	Players are listed according to the date of their debut for the club.
Debut year	Year of players' first VFL/AFL matches for Fitzroy.
Games	The number of games played.
Goals	The number of goals scored.
Years at club	The yearspan of the player's appearances for Fitzroy.
†	Inducted into the Australian Football Hall of Fame.

== 1890s ==
Debut year	Player	Games	Goals	Years at club
1897	Ivan Astruc	6	1	1897
1897	Tom Banks	8	0	1897
1897	John G. Dalton	44	0	1897–1900
1897	Pat Descrimes	55	18	1897–1900
1897	Jim Grace	47	33	1897–1899
1897	Mick Grace	65	55	1897–1900
1897	Pat Hickey	61	3	1897–1901
1897	Ern Jenkins	182	16	1897–1908, 1910
1897	Chris Kiernan	102	110	1897–1901, 1903, 1911
1897	Percy Kimberley	5	0	1897
1897	Roger Lamley	10	6	1897–1898
1897	Dick McCabe	24	14	1897–1898
1897	Samuel McMichael	10	0	1897
1897	Bill McSpeerin	126	93	1897–1904
1897	Dan Moriarty	12	2	1897
1897	Geoff Moriarty	106	0	1897, 1899–1907
1897	Arch Muirhead	16	3	1897–1898
1897	Jerry Nolan	34	1	1897–1899
1897	Ted Staniland	5	3	1897
1897	Jim Whelan	2	0	1897
1897	Tim Curran	3	0	1897
1897	Fred Nomens	2	1	1897
1897	Bert Rapiport	3	1	1897
1897	Alec Sloan	66	0	1897–1902
1897	Paddy Noonan	36	7	1897–1899
1897	Stan Reid	24	0	1897–1898
1897	Bill Cleary	21	6	1897–1899
1897	Bert Sharpe	99	59	1897–1903
1897	Joe Kerrigan	5	1	1897, 1899
1897	Charlie Cameron	5	1	1897
1897	Mick Peppard	5	0	1897
1897	Henry Yager	1	0	1897
1897	Alex Davidson	4	0	1897–1898
1897	Hugh McEwen	32	0	1897–1901
1897	Herb Nolan	4	0	1897–1898
1897	Harry James	1	0	1897
1897	Kelly Robinson	58	1	1897–1901
1898	Bill Dalton	57	9	1898–1902
1898	Eddie Drohane	75	5	1898–1902
1898	Charlie Jenkins	8	0	1898
1898	Bill Potter	60	8	1898–1902
1898	Jim Tulloch	1	0	1898
1898	Arthur Davidson	2	0	1898
1898	Johnny Power	10	0	1898–1899
1898	Charlie Doherty	2	0	1898
1898	Alf McDougall	59	28	1898–1902
1898	Fred Fontaine	110	33	1898–1907
1898	Harry Clarke	91	3	1898–1904
1898	George Shaw	5	1	1898
1899	Bill Thompson	10	1	1899–1900
1899	Jack Deas	33	0	1899–1901
1899	Charlie Foletta	5	1	1899
1899	Tom Nolan	2	0	1899
1899	Tammy Beauchamp	135	12	1899–1903, 1905–1908
1899	Bob Hay	8	1	1899–1901
1899	Jack Mulcahy	2	0	1899

== 1900s ==
Debut year	Player	Games	Goals	Years at club
1900	Lou Barker	150	63	1900–1908
1900	Gerald Brosnan	131	160	1900–1909
1900	Archibald Middleton	3	1	1900
1900	Joe Grace	2	0	1900
1900	Dave McGrath	1	1	1900
1900	Gordon Ross	4	1	1900–1901
1901	Bertie Loel	15	2	1901–1902
1901	Jim Paternoster	7	0	1901
1901	Matt Paternoster	12	4	1901
1901	Jim Sharp	161	43	1901–1910
1901	Percy Trotter	109	145	1901–1906
1901	Alf Bartlett	80	5	1901–1907
1901	Bob Smith	71	33	1901–1903, 1906–1909
1901	Alf Wilkinson	80	75	1901–1906, 1908
1901	Frank Hince	17	0	1901–1902
1902	Frank Brophy	26	20	1902–1903
1902	George Hutchinson	9	0	1902
1902	Henry Alder	1	0	1902
1902	Charlie Naismith	33	30	1902, 1906–1907
1902	Wally Naismith	143	20	1902–1910
1902	Mark Shea	24	1	1902–1904
1902	George Kruse	1	0	1902
1902	Bill McCarthy	11	0	1902
1902	Arthur Gilligan	3	4	1902
1902	Sam Baker	6	0	1902–1903
1902	Teddy Best	14	0	1902–1903
1902	Herbert Milne	122	69	1902–1910
1902	Jack Trehey	1	0	1902
1902	Fred Howard	2	0	1902
1902	Alby McDonald	7	1	1902–1903
1903	Bill Griffiths	8	2	1903
1903	Charlie Martin	2	0	1903
1903	Bill Walker	169	25	1903–1914
1903	Les Millis	126	76	1903–1909
1903	Alf Sharp	19	0	1903–1904
1904	Joe Johnson	55	15	1904–1906
1904	Edgar Kneen	48	33	1904–1906
1904	Percy Sheehan	58	11	1904–1906, 1908–1909
1904	Bill Kelly	7	0	1904
1904	Paddy Shea	13	8	1904
1904	Hedley Tomkins	4	0	1904
1904	Fred Lethbridge	3	1	1904
1904	Gilbert Barker	42	4	1904–1906
1904	Jack McDonough	29	6	1904–1905
1904	Les Sharp	23	12	1904–1905, 1907–1908
1905	Syd Billings	34	2	1905–1907
1905	Jack Holt	22	2	1905–1906
1905	Sonny Douglas	2	1	1905
1905	George Elliott	1	0	1905
1905	Barclay Bailes	79	29	1905–1909
1905	Sam Davison	2	0	1905
1905	Ridley Plaisted	5	8	1905–1907
1906	Frank Abbott	31	4	1906–1907, 1912
1906	Jim Neylan	1	0	1906
1906	Rupe Bradley	2	1	1906
1906	Joe Youlden	2	0	1906
1906	Lou Jacobs	1	2	1906
1906	Jimmy Luff	2	0	1906
1907	Bill Blacklock	4	1	1907
1907	Jack Cooper	136	8	1907–1915
1907	Jack Dawson	13	0	1907
1907	Harold McLennan	135	22	1907–1916, 1919
1907	Norm McLennan	7	2	1907–1908
1907	Charlie Owen	14	11	1907–1908
1907	Herb Byrne	2	0	1907
1907	Wally Johnson	190	83	1907–1916, 1919
1907	Alf Appleton	6	2	1907
1907	Mick Mornane	1	0	1907
1907	George McWilliam	17	1	1907–1909
1907	Tom Sadlier	1	2	1907
1907	Jack Edgeley	6	1	1907–1908
1907	Arthur Treloar	4	3	1907–1908
1908	Billy Dick	53	40	1908–1910
1908	Val Duncan	11	0	1908
1908	Bill Franklin	5	4	1908
1908	George Holden	164	37	1908–1911, 1913–1919
1908	Jim Thorpe	2	0	1908
1908	Bill Campbell	1	0	1908
1908	Charlie Taylor	19	0	1908–1909
1908	Ned Richardson	2	0	1908–1909
1908	Bill Dinsmore	19	13	1908–1909
1908	Fred Forbes	5	6	1908
1908	Tom Norton	1	2	1908
1909	George Lambert	107	5	1909–1917
1909	Clive Morrison	23	18	1909–1910
1909	Arthur Newbound	24	13	1909–1910
1909	Percy Parratt	195	202	1909–1917, 1920–1923
1909	Bill Payne	17	0	1909–1910
1909	Jim Lynch	8	0	1909
1909	Arthur Ferguson	20	1	1909–1910
1909	George Pyke	5	1	1909
1909	Norm Richardson	1	0	1909
1909	Dave Earsman	3	0	1909
1909	Bernie Brophy	1	1	1909
1909	Bob Briggs	26	47	1909–1910
1909	Sid O'Neill	1	0	1909

== 1910s ==
Debut year	Player	Games	Goals	Years at club
1910	Ted Farrell	12	3	1910–1911
1910	Bert Lenne	157	7	1910–1922
1910	Jim Porter	15	14	1910–1911, 1913
1910	Fred Scott	3	1	1910
1910	Fred Kirkwood	18	0	1910–1911
1910	Bill Marchbank	22		1910–1912
1910	Joe Brophy	2	2	1910
1910	Len Richardson	1	0	1910
1910	Bill Drew	8	4	1910
1910	Andy Pattison	16	0	1910–1911
1910	Bob Rahilly	33	21	1910–1912
1910	Herman Bartlett	1	1	1910
1910	George Featherston	5	1	1910
1911	Teddy Buist	59	15	1911–1916
1911	Ernie Everett	3	0	1911
1911	Jack Furness	6	3	1911
1911	Frank Lamont	17	9	1911–1912
1911	Tom Moloughney	1	0	1911
1911	Danny Murphy	1	0	1911
1911	Eric Watson	1	1	1911
1911	Artie Freeman	1	0	1911
1911	Cliff Hutton	34	7	1911–1912
1911	Fred Markby	2	0	1911
1911	George Shaw	117	48	1911–1916, 1919–1920
1911	Tom McCluskey	5	0	1911
1911	Tom Reardon	16	4	1911
1911	Thornton Clarke	4	0	1911
1911	Fred Bamford	119	1	1911–1919
1911	Clarrie Dall	9	9	1911–1912
1911	Bill Moxon	3	0	1911
1911	Charlie Dowell	8	0	1911–1912
1911	Bruce Campbell	15	27	1911–1912
1911	Charlie McMillan	8	4	1911
1911	Charlie Norris	106	19	1911–1918
1911	Alby Sheehan	1	0	1911
1911	Arthur Francis	1	0	1911
1912	Jimmy Freake	174	442	1912–1924
1912	Tom Willoughby	38	22	1912–1914
1912	Billy Holmes	16	11	1912
1912	Tom Strownix	20	0	1912–1914
1912	Hugh Heron	10	1	1912
1912	Percy Heron	46	17	1912–1915
1912	Harry Collins	6	0	1912, 1915
1912	Bill Laver	7	1	1912
1912	Tom Wells	5	1	1912
1912	Jack McArthur	14	0	1912–1913
1912	Bill Scott	3	1	1912
1913	Johnny Downs	2	0	1913
1913	George King	15	4	1913, 1915–1916
1913	Roy Millen	117	9	1913–1923
1913	Jim Toohey, Sr.	78	102	1913–1917, 1920
1913	Artie Harrison	19	3	1913–1914
1913	Ted McDonald	46	2	1913, 1915–1919
1913	Don Munro	1	0	1913
1913	Orm Fowler	1	0	1913
1913	Charlie Wells	15	6	1913–1914
1913	Thomas Heaney	98	95	1913–1917, 1919–1921
1913	Jack Loughnan	1	0	1913
1913	Billy Wilson	9	3	1913–1914
1913	Henry Anderson	6	0	1913
1913	Chris Lethbridge	148	19	1913–1922
1913	Roland Lynch	1	0	1913
1913	Jim Martin	27	16	1913–1914
1914	Arthur Jones	7	3	1914
1914	Paddy Abbott	40	1	1914–1918
1914	Bob Teasdale	1	0	1914
1914	George Pattison	8	0	1914–1915, 1917
1914	Stan Rodgerson	1	0	1914
1915	Dave Crone	3	1	1915
1915	Bill Stone	9	3	1915
1915	Harry Smith	6	0	1915–1916
1915	Clive Fergie	67	42	1915–1916, 1919–1924
1915	Tom Lowrie	48	48	1915–1919
1915	Bert O'Dee	31	5	1915–1916, 1919–1921
1916	Teddy Purcell	18	2	1916–1917
1916	Horrie Jenkin	168	22	1916–1928
1916	Bill Gibaud	1	0	1916
1916	Frank Ballantyne	4	1	1916
1916	Frank O'Keefe	1	1	1916
1916	Charlie Byrne	2	1	1916–1917
1916	Bob King	61	0	1916–1921
1916	Fred Moore	48	29	1916–1919
1916	Bill Reeves	1	0	1916
1916	Maurie Barrett	2	1	1916
1916	Harold Walker	1	0	1916
1917	Norm Barker	3	0	1917
1917	Bill Byrne	10	2	1917
1917	Frank Strawbridge	32	10	1917–1919
1917	Jim Atkinson	112	0	1917–1925
1917	Harry Powditch	2	0	1917–1918
1917	Alex Kennedy	9	2	1917–1918
1917	Jack O'Brien	6	1	1917–1918
1917	Carl Keller	85	5	1917–1923
1917	Len Wigraft	135	41	1917–1927
1917	Doug Bennett	4	2	1917
1917	Gordon Rattray	87	65	1917, 1919–1924, 1928
1918	Billy Billett	12	2	1918
1918	Clarrie Featherston	14	4	1918–1919
1918	Stan Molan	111	59	1918–1924
1918	Bill Thorpe	5	3	1918
1918	Cyril Zimmer	1	1	1918
1918	Wally Beckwith	1	0	1918
1918	Clarrie Sherry	75	3	1918–1923
1918	Les Gibaud	10	5	1918
1918	Les Boyne	4	1	1918, 1922
1918	Norm Byron	2	1	1918
1918	Vic Nankervis	2	1	1918
1919	George Gough	23	28	1919–1921
1919	Bob Scott	9	0	1919
1919	Joe Shortill	6	3	1919
1919	Syd Smith	1	3	1919
1919	Bob Merrick	59	181	1919–1922, 1926
1919	Bert Taylor	50	7	1919–1922
1919	George Muir	1	1	1919
1919	Fred Keays	5	1	1919–1920

== 1920s ==
Debut year	Player	Games	Goals	Years at club
1920	Johnny Carter	7	0	1920
1920	Gordon McCracken	109	61	1920–1927
1920	Len Gale	58	54	1920–1924
1920	Bill McGilvray	26	13	1920–1921
1920	Fred Williams	106	18	1920–1928
1920	Fred Chanter	1	0	1920
1920	Dave G. McGrath	10	6	1920
1920	Alf Boyce	4	10	1920
1920	Fred Chapman	2	1	1920–1921
1920	Don Hutchins	1	2	1920
1921	Harold Carter	38	34	1921–1923
1921	Ern Elliott	95	0	1921–1927
1921	Joe Scales	25	0	1921–1923
1921	George Welsh	7	2	1921
1921	Harry Watson	1	0	1921
1921	Norm Lugg	12	6	1921
1921	Alf Key	2	0	1921
1921	Arnold Beitzel	5	5	1921
1921	Bill Hicks	4	0	1921–1922
1922	Norm Cockram	120	82	1922–1928, 1932–1933
1922	Tommy Corrigan	107	13	1922–1928
1922	Steve Donnellan	27	12	1922–1925
1922	Hector McNeil	7	2	1922
1922	Percy Chalmers	1	0	1922
1922	Goldie Collins	64	9	1922–1924, 1926–1928
1922	John Hamilton	7	3	1922–1923
1922	Les Warren	40	0	1922–1927
1922	Alwin Dalitz	1	3	1922
1923	Arch Dickens	64	24	1923–1926, 1930–1931
1923	Jim Tarbotton	37	1	1923–1926
1923	Ernie Watson	1	0	1923
1923	Les Bryant	35	23	1923–1924
1923	Ern Michel	5	0	1923
1923	Jack Scales	12	3	1923–1924
1924	Arthur Batchelor	112	70	1924–1931
1924	Fred Beeson	2	2	1924–1925
1924	Bryan Cosgrave	5	4	1924
1924	Charlie Deslandes	8	4	1924
1924	Jack Moriarty †	157	626	1924–1933
1924	Bill Adams	51	17	1924–1926
1924	Norm Collins	4	1	1924–1925
1924	Doug Parks	1	1	1924
1924	Roy Snell	1	0	1924
1924	Len May	1	0	1924
1924	Bill Turner	3	1	1924
1924	Bobby Walker	3	2	1924
1924	George Gordon	23	0	1924, 1926–1927
1924	Mike McMahon	7		1924, 1928–1929
1924	Tom Hickey	35	24	1924–1929
1924	Charlie Chapman	104	161	1924–1931
1925	Frank Costigan	26	9	1925–1927
1925	Jack O'Rourke	34	41	1925–1927
1925	Reg Smith	6	4	1925
1925	Jack Millen	61	42	1925–1928, 1930
1925	Stewart McLatchie	4	4	1925
1925	Eric Reichman	18	0	1925, 1927–1928
1925	Eric Chatfield	17	0	1925, 1928
1925	Davitt Coghlan	25	10	1925, 1928–1930
1925	Bill Curtis	2	2	1925
1925	Gordon Hellwig	51	28	1925–1928
1925	Doug Anderson	8	2	1925–1926
1926	Jack Cashman	76	102	1926–1931, 1934
1926	Bert Carey	5	5	1926
1926	Reg Knipe	1	1	1926
1926	Vic Truman	10	0	1926
1926	Bob Allen	2	1	1926
1926	Lockie Wood	22	5	1926–1928
1926	Ed Ryan	3	0	1926
1926	John Fitzgerald	3	0	1926
1926	Cyril Kemp	26	1	1926–1928
1926	Phonse Hayes	5	0	1926
1926	Luke Brown	1	0	1926
1927	Lou Bols	27	4	1927–1928, 1930
1927	Roy Milne	21	3	1927–1928
1927	Willis Reeve	86	0	1927–1932
1927	Bert White	14	8	1927
1927	Claude Toovey	15	0	1927
1927	Steve Foley	15	0	1927–1928
1927	John Hayes	1	0	1927
1927	Bill Williams	4	0	1927
1927	Bill Donald	1	0	1927
1927	George Gibbs	11	2	1927–1928
1927	Jack Lean	6	5	1927–1928
1927	George Waterhouse	1	0	1927
1928	Tasman Roberts	17	10	1928
1928	Eddie Schenk	16	0	1928–1929
1928	Jim Shanahan	27	3	1928–1929
1928	Doug Ringrose	35	30	1928–1929
1928	Allan Johnston	2	0	1928
1928	Charlie McKinley	1	0	1928
1928	Jack Vale	29	1	1928–1929
1928	Ned Kick	2	1	1928
1928	Frank Gibson	63	10	1928–1932
1928	Robbie Gall	4	2	1928–1929
1928	Tom Meehan	5	0	1928
1928	Henry Powell	1	0	1928
1928	Tommy Williams	136	41	1928–1937
1929	Jack Buckley	5	0	1929
1929	Alex Byrne	1	0	1929
1929	Percy Ellis	59	5	1929–1932
1929	Cecil Kerr	64	3	1929–1932
1929	Paul Killeen	5	0	1929
1929	Tom Laurenson	2	0	1929
1929	Colin MacKay	4	3	1929
1929	Colin Niven	59	16	1929–1932
1929	Norm Harris	1	1	1929
1929	Neville Huggins	4	3	1929
1929	Tommy Pratt	11	3	1929
1929	Ivan Sharp	18	13	1929–1930
1929	Norm Stott	12	5	1929–1930
1929	Arthur Cockram	1	0	1929
1929	Percy Roberts	18	1	1929, 1932
1929	Norm Beckham	3	0	1929
1929	Tom McCaffrey	2	1	1929
1929	Roy Finlayson	39	7	1929–1932
1929	Roy Henry	2	0	1929
1929	Jim Watson	6	0	1929
1929	Johnny Davies	1	0	1929
1929	Les Scollard	3	1	1929
1929	Ted Shiels	3	0	1929
1929	Alan Fitcher	98	21	1929–1936
1929	Frank Pearce	21	0	1929–1931
1929	Bob Hall	1	0	1929
1929	Len Hooke	7	16	1929–1930

== 1930s ==
Debut year	Player	Games	Goals	Years at club
1930	Frank Beggs	4	0	1930
1930	Colin Benham	81	70	1930–1936
1930	Fred Davies	63	11	1930–1931, 1933–1934
1930	Con Hogan	30	0	1930–1931
1930	Gerald McKenzie	18	0	1930
1930	Harry Challis	3	0	1930
1930	Jack Williams	4	4	1930
1930	Wilfred Smallhorn †	150	31	1930–1940
1930	Frank Raymond	1	0	1930
1930	Ken Veevers	18	2	1930–1932
1930	Keith Fleming	6	4	1930, 1934
1930	Ken Mackie	7	15	1930–1931
1930	Roy McDougall	8	0	1930–1932
1930	Lindsay Fricker	1	0	1930
1931	Haydn Bunton Sr. †	119	207	1931–1937, 1942
1931	Lionel Hastie	13	15	1931
1931	Austin Hogan	5	2	1931
1931	Les Prior	12	11	1931
1931	Ray Niven	23	24	1931, 1933–1934
1931	Harry Verdon	1	3	1931
1931	Dinny Dowd	15	1	1931
1931	Jack Rocchi	4	0	1931
1931	Leo Bird	8	2	1931
1931	Tom Harrington	1	0	1931
1931	Harold Hartney	4	0	1931
1931	Roy Hearn	8	9	1931
1931	Horrie Dawson	140	62	1931–1940
1931	Ian Fleming	64	32	1931–1935
1931	Fred Heintz	14	18	1931–1933
1931	Stan Jones	1	0	1931
1931	Frank Fleming	2	1	1931
1931	Charlie Holmes	1	0	1931
1932	Frank Curcio	249	17	1932–1936, 1938–1943, 1945–1948
1932	Mal MacRae	6	6	1932
1932	Douglas Nicholls	54	2	1932–1937
1932	Laurie Plunkett	2	0	1932
1932	Jack Sexton	29	10	1932–1934
1932	Len Stott	62	16	1932–1937
1932	Harold Boyd	11	1	1932
1932	Ron Shapter	18	13	1932–1934
1932	George Chapman	13	9	1932
1932	Phil Lane	1	0	1932
1932	Ernie Burnes	4	2	1932
1932	Joe McKinley	1	0	1932
1932	Lew Sharpe	6	0	1932
1932	Stan Castles	2	3	1932
1932	Ray Coller	4	2	1932
1932	John Ryan	4	1	1932
1932	Wally Gray	87	4	1932–1938
1932	Alf Taggart	3	0	1932
1932	Wally Coates	2	0	1932
1932	Jack Cleary	3	0	1932
1932	Tommy Wells	4	1	1932
1932	Mickey Sharp	104	90	1932–1941
1933	Alf Callick	37	6	1933–1935, 1937
1933	Jock Cordner	24	23	1933–1934
1933	Frank Donnellan	36	0	1933–1934
1933	Dan Murray	66	4	1933–1934, 1938–1941, 1943–1945
1933	Frank O'Rourke	7	2	1933
1933	Seff Parry	5	3	1933
1933	Wally Mitchell	2	0	1933
1933	Leslie Watt	35	19	1933–1937
1933	Keith Marshall	2	5	1933
1933	Clete Turner	15	3	1933–1934
1933	Arthur Williams	3	0	1933
1933	Bruce Scharp	2	0	1933
1933	Keith Giffen	2	0	1933
1933	Claude Canaway	1	0	1933
1933	Jack Kidd	1	2	1933
1934	Bill Bedford	5	5	1934
1934	Rex Byrne	2	0	1934
1934	Len Pye	16	39	1934–1935
1934	Bill Shenfield	25	16	1934–1935
1934	Jim Steigenberger	3	0	1934
1934	Brian Goodhart	15	4	1934–1935
1934	Charles Cameron	23	52	1934–1936
1934	Allan Thompson	23	23	1934–1936
1934	Maurie Hearn	128	87	1934–1937, 1939–1944
1934	Bob Muir	2	0	1934
1934	Noel Fisher	7	4	1934–1935
1935	Denis Ryan	70	65	1935–1939
1935	Bert Beard	13	6	1935
1935	Frank Seymour	5	9	1935
1935	Mel Rudd	5	1	1935
1935	Richie Saunders	16	0	1935–1936
1935	Leo Maynes	15	4	1935–1937
1935	Ron Latham	1	0	1935
1935	Don Quartermain	4	0	1935–1936
1935	Ted Griffin	1	1	1935
1935	Jim Toohey, Jr.	35	32	1935–1936, 1938
1935	Alf Neeson	7	0	1935–1936
1935	Wally O'Brien	2	0	1935
1935	Len Blackley	2	2	1935
1935	Keith McPhee	1	0	1935
1936	Norm Andrews	4	1	1936
1936	Col Crawford	1	0	1936
1936	Arthur Hall	68	4	1936–1941
1936	Tom Ledwidge	6	3	1936, 1938
1936	Russell McInnes	13	0	1936–1937
1936	Bob McLellan	12	2	1936–1937
1936	Jack McConchie	22	45	1936–1937
1936	Leo Monaghan	52	20	1936, 1938, 1941–1944, 1947–1948
1936	Bill Warne	6	3	1936–1937
1936	Peter Connell	7	4	1936
1936	Terry MacKin	13	4	1936
1936	John Cadusch	7	0	1936
1936	Eric Clark	34	1	1936–1939
1936	Ken Read	4	5	1936
1936	Charlie O'Leary	7	0	1936–1937
1936	Joe O'Meara	10	6	1936–1937
1936	Les Ames	5	5	1936
1936	Bob Fitzsimmons	7	1	1936–1937
1936	Jock McKenzie	48	57	1936–1939
1936	Arthur Edwards	36	22	1936–1940, 1944–1945
1936	Bruce Calverley	89	22	1936–1945
1936	Tom Re	3	0	1936–1937
1936	Allan White	31	33	1936–1939, 1943
1937	Les Hughson	15	12	1937
1937	Laurie Morgan	34	14	1937–1939
1937	Bernie Treweek	57	0	1937–1940
1937	Tommy Laskey	4	2	1937
1937	Bill Bunworth	18	4	1937–1938
1937	Wally Mutimer	27	10	1937–1938
1937	Audley Gillespie-Jones	49	5	1937–1942, 1945–1946
1937	Mick Hughson	95	17	1937–1942, 1945–1946
1937	Bill Lowenthal	13	1	1937
1937	Vic Carroll	12	2	1937
1937	Dick Noble	4	0	1937
1937	Charlie Bartling	2	0	1937
1937	Tom Butherway	1	0	1937
1937	Len Smith	76	52	1937–1943, 1945
1937	Reg Trigg	4	8	1937–1938
1937	Charlie Young	2	0	1937
1937	Allen Nilan	1	0	1937
1938	Neil Boyd	4	0	1938
1938	Geoff Dalley	6	6	1938
1938	Fred Backway	1	0	1938
1938	Arch Knott	37	11	1938–1941, 1944
1938	Clen Denning	159	59	1938–1947
1938	Bert Minney	18	0	1938–1939
1938	Jack Norman	1	1	1938
1938	Fred Hughson	164	95	1938–1947
1938	Gordon Dennis	9	4	1938–1939
1938	Peter Reville	22	27	1938–1939
1938	Bob Sayers	4	0	1938–1939
1938	Harry Jacobs	4	0	1938–1939
1938	Jack Wegner	1	0	1938
1938	Arthur Hart	38	37	1938–1941
1938	Len Catton	4	0	1938–1939
1938	Alf Hurley	16	24	1938–1939
1938	Ingy Norman	1	0	1938
1939	Noel Price	104	98	1939–1942, 1944–1947
1939	Claude Curtin	93	269	1939–1942, 1944, 1946–1947, 1949
1939	Jim Tagell	9	7	1939–1940
1939	Keith Stackpole	84	203	1939–1944
1939	Alan Fields	57	27	1939–1940, 1944, 1946–1947
1939	Norm Hillard	94	12	1939–1946
1939	Ted Besford	2	0	1939, 1941
1939	Llew Martin	2	0	1939
1939	Mick Keighery	1	0	1939

== 1940s ==
Debut year	Player	Games	Goals	Years at club
1940	Alf Clay	41	17	1940–1944
1940	Kevin Fox	22	32	1940, 1946
1940	Ted Hill	22	2	1940, 1942–1945
1940	Bob Merrick	6	2	1940, 1944
1940	Shadrach James	18	20	1940–1941
1940	Lindsay McNamara	4	1	1940–1941
1940	Des Calverley	52	16	1940–1946
1940	Keith Forbes	4	10	1940
1940	Syd McGain	12	0	1940–1943
1940	Stan Wright	81	37	1940–1946
1940	Bert Clay	157	48	1940–1951
1940	Walter Dudley	3	4	1940
1940	Lindsay Dyring	45	5	1940–1941, 1943–1944, 1946
1940	Allan Ruthven †	222	442	1940–1941, 1943–1954
1940	Alan Muir	6	0	1940–1942
1940	Ken Sier	59	61	1940–1941, 1944–1947
1941	Albert Collier †	12	12	1941–1942
1941	Les Hill	52	4	1941–1944, 1946
1941	Ivor Clay	31	19	1941–1946
1941	Eddie Hart	98	323	1941, 1944, 1946–1951
1941	Colin Cox	5	0	1941, 1946
1941	Harold Powell	3	3	1941
1941	Geoff Nicholls	27	7	1941, 1944, 1948–1949
1941	Bill Jones	1	0	1941
1941	Bob Robinson	5	7	1941–1942
1942	Bruce Bridges	3	0	1942
1942	Leon Gemmell	18	5	1942–1943, 1945–1946
1942	Doug Oliphant	7	11	1942
1942	Len Toyne	12	4	1942
1942	George Watson	4	3	1942
1942	Jim Hallahan	32	7	1942–1944
1942	Reg Hammond	1	2	1942
1942	Vin Doherty	12	21	1942–1943
1942	Jack Grant	26	58	1942–1943
1942	Angie Muller	1	1	1942
1942	Leo Hicks	3	0	1942
1942	Bernie McVeigh	6	2	1942
1942	Arthur O'Bryan	46	29	1942, 1944–1946
1942	Billy Hall	2	0	1942
1942	George Hoskins	72	1	1942–1947
1943	Wally Miller	36	33	1943–1945
1943	Les Powell	3	0	1943
1943	Max Rippon	2	0	1943
1943	Stan Dawson	57	40	1943–1946
1943	Harold Winberg	32	12	1943, 1945–1946
1943	Merv Brooks	2	0	1943–1944
1943	Doug Brown	13	21	1943
1943	Ralph Patman	1	0	1943
1943	Jack Lancaster	9	6	1943–1944
1943	Bob McHenry	5	2	1943
1943	Ted Tomkins	1	0	1943
1943	Bernie Fyffe	2	3	1943
1943	Monty Horan	21	1	1943–1946
1943	Adrian Hearn	3	1	1943
1943	Dennis Hall	5	0	1943–1945
1943	Bill Spokes	5	3	1943–1944
1944	Billy Walsh	1	0	1944
1944	Wally Bristowe	18	14	1944–1945
1944	Laurie Bickerton	12	0	1944
1944	Charlie Linney	12	0	1944–1946
1944	Jack Harrow	2	0	1944
1944	Noel Jarvis	159	31	1944–1952
1944	Norm Johnstone	228	185	1944–1957
1944	Jack Symons	36	58	1944–1946
1945	Laurie Crouch	8	4	1945–1946
1945	Jack Collins	31	36	1945–1949
1945	Jim Kettle	41	23	1945, 1947–1952
1945	Peter Dalwood	7	12	1945
1945	Ed White	1	0	1945
1945	Don Hammond	5	0	1945
1945	Harold Shillinglaw	63	19	1945–1951
1945	Jim Brown	10	5	1945, 1947
1946	Alan McLaughlin	76	6	1946–1950
1946	Merv Smith	9	0	1946–1948
1946	Vic Chanter	108	0	1946–1952
1946	Norm Reidy	1	0	1946
1946	Reg Nicholls	83	3	1946–1950
1946	Bob Miller	44	3	1946–1950
1946	Stan Vandersluys	47	26	1946–1952
1946	Allan Broadway	3	2	1946
1947	Bill Stephen	162	4	1947–1957
1947	Don Chipp	3	1	1947
1947	George Coates	128	128	1947–1954
1947	Heinz Tonn	6	2	1947
1947	Dick Kennedy	63	47	1947–1951
1947	Neil O'Reilly	1	0	1947
1947	Jack Toohey	57	12	1947–1949, 1951–1952
1947	Llew Owens	5	3	1947
1947	Kevin Hart	19	8	1947–1949
1948	Ron Kinder	5	1	1948
1948	Ken Ross	129	36	1948–1955, 1959–1960
1948	Keith Williams	18	12	1948
1948	Wal Alexander	7	0	1948
1948	Eric Moore	19	14	1948–1950
1948	Gerry Sier	10	0	1948–1949
1948	Gordon Brunnen	3	0	1948
1948	Bill Charleson	4	0	1948
1948	Alan Gale	213	19	1948–1961
1949	Jack Gaffney	80	0	1949–1953
1949	Ron Simpson	37	23	1949–1953
1949	Norm Smith †	17	26	1949–1950
1949	Barry Waters	1	0	1949
1949	Ray Donnellan	40	0	1949–1951
1949	Jack Streader	69	45	1949–1955
1949	Don Furness	136	43	1949–1959
1949	Eddie Goodger	149	1	1949–1958
1949	Ron Bickley	29	0	1949–1951
1949	Ron Wright	3	0	1949
1949	Reg Milburn	2	0	1949

== 1950s ==
Debut year	Player	Games	Goals	Years at club
1950	Alan Sorrell	1	0	1950
1950	Ron Dunn	14	0	1950–1951
1950	Lance Watson	23	1	1950–1952
1950	Arthur Fitt	2	0	1950
1950	Don Hart	37	43	1950–1951, 1953
1951	Jack Gervasoni	89	86	1951–1956
1951	Fred Anderson	20	3	1951–1953
1951	Tom Magee	39	6	1951–1953
1951	Greg Lourey	10	1	1951–1952
1951	Noel Carroll	12	1	1951, 1953
1951	Bob Roberts	30	4	1951–1952, 1954
1952	Neville Broderick	50	3	1952–1954
1952	Tony Ongarello	131	247	1952–1960
1952	Colin Davey	77	9	1952–1959
1952	Ray Millington	2	0	1952
1952	Kevin Wright	140	160	1952–1961
1952	George Ashman	5	0	1952–1953
1952	Kevin Blizzard	1	0	1952
1952	John Harding	27	7	1952–1954
1952	Joe Hickey	26	48	1952–1953
1952	Jack MacGregor	87	23	1952–1958
1952	Vin Williams	93	7	1952–1959
1952	Joe Murphy	11	0	1952–1953
1952	Kevin Tame	3	0	1952
1953	Arnie Bench	37	0	1953–1955
1953	Tom Meehan	19	0	1953–1954
1953	Reg Renwick	3	0	1953
1953	Graham Spooner	2	0	1953
1953	Kevin Darrigan	33	8	1953–1956
1953	Jim Cusack	2	0	1953
1953	Ern Trickey	12	4	1953–1955
1953	John Ford	1	0	1953
1953	Keith Webb	47	26	1953–1959, 1961
1953	Bob Henderson	137	1	1953, 1955–1962
1953	Graham Knight	55	41	1953–1960
1953	Charlie Wanhope	4	0	1953–1954
1954	Ron Morgan	8	8	1954
1954	Brian Pert	125	18	1954–1965
1954	Ken Chambers	4	1	1954–1955
1954	John Barrett	22	1	1954–1955
1954	Ray Davies	1	0	1954
1954	Gordon Proudfoot	5	0	1954–1955
1954	Owen Abrahams	132	232	1954–1962
1954	Rod Vernon	119	72	1954–1963
1954	Ron Harvey	127	49	1954–1955, 1957–1963
1954	Jeff Patterson	7	6	1954
1954	James Chapman	14	1	1954–1956
1954	Leo Smyth	56	25	1954–1958
1954	Eddie Tucker	4	1	1954
1954	Reg Carr	20	0	1954–1956
1955	Bob Collins	3	0	1955
1955	Toby Elder	5	1	1955
1955	Alan Anton	2	2	1955
1955	Kevin Murray †	333	51	1955–1964, 1967–1974
1955	Wally Clark	105	120	1955–1962
1955	Ron Smith	9	0	1955–1956
1955	Bobby Wilson	3	1	1955
1955	John Charles	2	0	1955
1955	Laurie Jarman	2	2	1955
1955	Bill Smith	2	0	1955
1956	Matt Cunningham	37	16	1956–1957, 1959
1956	Max Galpin	4	0	1956
1956	Bryan Lane	12	8	1956–1957
1956	Graeme MacKenzie	105	1	1956, 1958–1962
1956	Ken Seymour	4	1	1956
1956	Ian Aston	98	22	1956–1962
1956	Graham Gotch	52	39	1956–1960
1956	Graham Campbell	151	154	1956–1964
1956	Colin Dodd	1	0	1956
1956	Ivan Smith	4	0	1956
1956	Dave Chivers	7	0	1956–1957
1957	Jack Clancy	1	0	1957
1957	John Hutchinson	3	3	1957
1957	John Shelton	6	3	1957
1957	Ken Grimley	9	16	1957
1957	Stan Whitmore	4	0	1957
1957	Barry Roberts	9	1	1957–1958
1957	Keith Rochow	4	1	1957
1957	Bruno Zorzi	18	0	1957–1958, 1960
1957	Ken Jones	55	2	1957–1961
1957	Ray Slocum	121	47	1957–1965
1957	Alan Chipp	1	0	1957
1957	Brian Barclay	61	9	1957–1962
1957	Tom Broadbent	1	0	1957
1957	Phil Rochow	1	0	1957
1957	Keith Wiegard	32	13	1957–1959, 1961
1958	Les Hughson, Jr.	28	1	1958–1962
1958	Gordon Dixon	4	0	1958
1958	Jim Broockmann	3	0	1958
1958	Keith Bromage	41	48	1958–1961
1959	Colin MacNeil	8	9	1959–1960
1959	Barrie Pigot	23	3	1959–1962
1959	Allan Lynch	106	17	1959–1966
1959	Geoff Hill	18	0	1959–1960
1959	Les Russell	7	0	1959, 1961
1959	Alan Wilson	2	2	1959

== 1960s ==
Debut year	Player	Games	Goals	Years at club
1960	Russell Crow	158	114	1960–1964, 1968–1973
1960	Bruce McMaster-Smith	13	1	1960–1961
1960	Stewart Duncan	30	7	1960–1964
1960	John Powell	48	12	1960–1963
1960	John Embrey	1	0	1960
1960	Brian Wicks	8	0	1960–1962
1961	John Hayes	94	21	1961–1966
1961	John Carmody	14	22	1961–1962
1961	David Sykes	34	37	1961–1963, 1967–1968
1961	Ian Powell	15	0	1961–1963
1961	Colin Bond	54	0	1961–1966
1961	Bryan Clements	23	6	1961–1964
1961	Bill Stevens	2	0	1961
1961	Wayne Eastman	73	9	1961–1968
1962	John Bahen	67	35	1962–1967
1962	Geoff Elliott	9	3	1962–1963
1962	Graeme Clyne	6	0	1962
1962	Max Miers	40	11	1962–1965
1962	Bill O'Kane	2	0	1962
1962	Norm Brown	181	77	1962–1973
1962	Ian McCrae	97	50	1962–1970
1962	Jim Renouf	1	0	1962
1962	Bob Beattie	58	1	1962–1967
1962	Colin Sleep	17	5	1962–1964
1962	Brian Beers	19	14	1962–1964
1962	Bob Eastaway	2	0	1962
1963	Gary Lazarus	132	206	1963–1970
1963	Brett Pollock	10	7	1963
1963	Brian Williams	2	0	1963
1963	Allan Anderson	4	0	1963
1963	Doug Hellings	64	15	1963, 1965–1969
1963	Stan Haag	4	1	1963
1963	Barry Rippon	3	5	1963
1963	Joe Dixon	5	0	1963
1963	Kevin Ellis	4	1	1963
1963	Ron Fry	46	7	1963–1967
1963	Brian Carroll	10	0	1963
1963	Ted Lovett	9	2	1963–1964
1963	Geoff Doubleday	1	0	1963
1963	Tony Hirst	19	3	1963–1965
1963	Barry Fitzgerald	35	4	1963–1965
1963	Barry Sadler	2	0	1963
1963	Terry O'Mara	20	1	1963–1965
1963	Bill Storer	9	7	1963–1964
1963	Graham Goninon	4	0	1963–1965
1964	David McKenzie	2	1	1964
1964	Ralph Rogerson	39	54	1964–1966
1964	Colin McRae	18	8	1964–1965
1964	John Newnham	116	89	1964–1971
1964	Eric Vinar	8	3	1964
1964	Kevin Mitchell	7	0	1964–1965
1964	Ross King	2	1	1964
1964	Alan Quaife	3	0	1964
1964	Graham Ramshaw	6	4	1964
1965	Graham Calverley	10	5	1965
1965	Bob Lynch	9	1	1965
1965	Daryl Peoples	77	50	1965–1970
1965	John Booth	46	16	1965–1967
1965	Lance Behan	4	2	1965
1965	Brian Hepper	8	1	1965–1966
1965	Jim Kemp	16	23	1965–1967
1965	Frank Johnson	3	0	1965
1965	Peter Wood	74	12	1965–1970
1965	Ray Calverley	21	2	1965–1967
1965	Brendon Hackwill	17	5	1965–1966
1965	Denis Hughson	1	1	1965
1965	Terry Brady	1	1	1965
1965	Bob Hayton	2	2	1965
1965	Peter Williams	7	2	1965–1966
1965	John O'Keeffe	1	0	1965
1965	Max Cole	52	0	1965–1969
1965	Bob Carroll	9	1	1965–1966
1966	Mike Andrews	80	13	1966–1972
1966	Peter Corkran	1	0	1966
1966	Colin Hobbs	64	6	1966–1971
1966	Paul O'Brien	47	2	1966–1969
1966	Trevor Dawson	9	6	1966, 1968
1966	Harry Corbett	10	2	1966–1967
1966	Russell Cromarty	18	25	1966–1967
1966	Bernie Drury	6	0	1966
1966	Kingsley Ellis	7	0	1966
1966	Treva McGregor	47	19	1966–1971
1966	Kevin Oakley	10	1	1966
1966	Kevin Parker	2	0	1966
1966	Cec Rheinberger	27	3	1966–1971
1966	Alex Ruscuklic	108	189	1966–1974
1966	George Carey	5	4	1966
1966	Rod Cobain	27	18	1966–1969
1966	Paul Hodgson	3	0	1966
1966	Dennis Aspinall	9	10	1966–1967
1966	Vern Drake	2	0	1966
1966	John Benison	52	2	1966–1970
1967	Ross Enbom	7	0	1967–1968
1967	John Murphy †	214	326	1967–1977
1967	Gary Ebbels	8	7	1967–1968
1967	David Wall	132	120	1967–1976
1967	Noel Zunneberg	71	3	1967–1972
1967	Barry Knight	4	2	1967, 1969
1967	Gavin Smith	1	0	1967
1967	Mike Hallahan	3	0	1967
1967	Dick Telford	2	0	1967
1967	Andrew Kuka	1	0	1967
1968	Darryl Herrod	47	1	1968–1971
1968	Barry McKenzie	38	15	1968–1972
1968	Barry Padley	159	94	1968–1978
1968	Bill Walford	11	16	1968
1968	Ross Parker	3	2	1968
1968	Hugh Worrall	13	4	1968–1969
1968	John Atkinson	3	1	1968
1968	Jack Austin	3	1	1968
1968	David Rhodes	72	14	1968–1973
1968	Doug Searl	131	170	1968–1976
1968	Graeme Shearer	19	5	1968–1970
1968	Norm Dare	72	24	1968–1974, 1977
1968	Harold Martin	1	0	1968
1969	Shane Molloy	61	4	1969, 1971–1974
1969	Bruce Baker	16	4	1969–1970
1969	Leigh Robertson	76	14	1969–1974
1969	Bill Sykes	48	5	1969–1971
1969	Harvey Merrigan	197	18	1969–1981
1969	Peter Ellis	7	0	1969–1971
1969	Bob Hodgkin	24	0	1969–1971
1969	Peter Weightman	1	1	1969
1969	Paul Shanahan	21	27	1969–1972
1969	Robert Ireland	5	0	1969–1970

== 1970s ==
Debut year	Player	Games	Goals	Years at club
1970	Alan Thompson	138	59	1970–1979
1970	Warwick Irwin	213	228	1970–1980, 1983
1970	John Duckworth	58	24	1970, 1974–1976
1970	Lawrie Bennett	1	0	1970
1970	Graeme Renwick	35	22	1970–1973
1971	Ray Sault	41	6	1971–1976
1971	Trevor Lloyd	61	19	1971–1975
1971	Laurie Richards	79	69	1971–1974
1971	Lyle Skinner	2	1	1971
1971	Garry Wilson †	268	452	1971–1984
1971	Jack Newton	12	33	1971, 1973
1971	Renato Serafini	81	117	1971–1977
1972	Ian McCulloch	60	16	1972–1975
1972	Glenn Robertson	50	13	1972–1976
1972	Jim Christou	30	23	1972–1976
1972	Ray Brain	13	1	1972–1974
1972	John Formosa	15	2	1972–1975
1972	Mark Amos	1	1	1972
1972	Geoff Austen	85	35	1972–1978
1972	Greg Booth	17	0	1972–1974
1972	Gerry Noonan	15	17	1972–1974
1973	David McMahon	218	236	1973–1984
1973	Kevin O'Keeffe	92	36	1973–1979, 1982
1973	Allan Sinclair	39	11	1973–1978
1973	Chris Smith	163	58	1973–1982
1973	Colin Cruse	15	3	1973–1974
1973	Kerrin Hayes	8	5	1973–1974
1973	Andrew Lukas	30	1	1973–1975
1974	Dean Farnham	17	4	1974–1975
1974	Ian Miller	80	33	1974–1977
1974	Neville Taylor	92	11	1974–1975, 1978–1982
1974	Dan Harrington	7	0	1974, 1976
1974	Don Whitford	42	8	1974–1978
1974	Rod Carter	76	0	1974–1979
1974	Wayne Linton	65	17	1974–1978
1974	Graeme Weatherley	14	16	1974–1975
1975	Rod Appleton	5	2	1975
1975	Peter Ruscuklic	10	20	1975–1976
1975	Robert Shepherd	43	31	1975–1977
1975	Graeme Allan	87	97	1975–1980
1975	Ian McGuinness	1	0	1975
1975	John Lorenzini	1	0	1975
1975	Jeff Clifton	9	0	1975–1976
1975	John Lewis	10	5	1975
1975	Lex Dwyer	6	3	1975–1977
1975	John Christou	7	1	1975–1977
1976	Ron Alexander	133	30	1976–1981
1976	Bob Beecroft	96	291	1976–1980
1976	Brian Brown	51	3	1976–1979, 1981
1976	Gary Chapman	16	17	1976–1978
1976	Leon Goonan	2	1	1976
1976	Max George	8	20	1976
1976	Grant Fowler	35	31	1976–1979
1976	Tim Godfrey	11	0	1976–1978
1977	Neil MacLeod	10	7	1977–1978
1977	Greg Parke	15	17	1977
1977	Peter Brown	44	16	1977–1980
1977	Chris Hansen	101	17	1977–1982
1977	Peter Johnston	8	9	1977, 1979
1977	Kalev Vann	2	0	1977
1977	Shane Gilmore	4	0	1977
1977	Russ Hodges	31	3	1977–1978
1977	Laurie Serafini	146	9	1977–1985
1977	Wayne Duke	9	1	1977–1979
1977	Mick Conlan	210	395	1977–1989
1977	Allan Holmes	1	0	1977
1977	Glenn Ward	3	0	1977
1978	Graham Bux	2	0	1978
1978	John Frazer	6	10	1978–1979
1978	Gerald McCarthy	75	23	1978–1982
1978	Grant Lawrie	151	56	1978–1988
1978	John Blair	4	2	1978
1978	Noel Mugavin	41	22	1978–1981
1978	Bernie Quinlan †	189	576	1978–1986
1978	Peter Keays	49	0	1978–1981
1978	Robert Walls †	41	77	1978–1980
1978	Rino Pretto	1	1	1978
1979	Malcolm Bramley	5	2	1979–1980
1979	Kevin Higgins	25	0	1979–1980
1979	Keith MacLeod	2	0	1979
1979	Max Richardson	30	41	1979–1980
1979	Michael Poynton	52	66	1979–1983
1979	Leon Harris	186	101	1979–1989

== 1980s ==
Debut year	Player	Games	Goals	Years at club
1980	Darryl Cox	16	8	1980, 1982–1983
1980	Phillip Early	3	1	1980
1980	Leigh McConnon	23	4	1980–1981
1980	Len Thompson †	13	19	1980
1980	Craig Braddy	8	3	1980–1981
1980	Rod Lewis	32	21	1980–1981, 1983
1980	Ross Thornton	146	26	1980–1989
1980	Bruce Chambers	1	0	1980
1980	David Rankin	9	2	1980–1981
1980	John Rantall †	6	0	1980
1980	Mick Gilmore	2	1	1980
1980	Frank Marchesani	16	17	1980
1980	Larry Watson	4	0	1980
1980	Les Parish	87	52	1980–1985
1980	Glenn Coleman	64	7	1980–1984
1980	Andrew Veal	6	0	1980
1980	Peter Foster	7	2	1980–1982
1980	Geoff Everett	15	1	1980–1982
1981	Graeme Hinchen	77	3	1981–1987
1981	Lee Murnane	51	49	1981–1984
1981	Matt Rendell	164	101	1981–1991
1981	Terry O'Neill	28	1	1981–1983
1981	Scott Clayton	160	23	1981–1990
1981	Leigh Carlson	75	48	1981–1984
1981	Des Herbert	14	5	1981–1983
1981	John Cassin	5	0	1981–1982
1981	Peter Francis	40	19	1981–1983
1982	Mark Eaves	2	0	1982–1983
1982	Michael Coates	29	5	1982–1984, 1986
1982	Brad Gotch	43	60	1982–1985
1982	Gary Pert	163	42	1982–1990
1982	Paul Roos †	269	270	1982–1994
1982	Andrew Merryweather	1	0	1982
1982	Jan Smith	7	1	1982
1982	Richard Osborne	187	411	1982–1992
1982	Grant O'Riley	6	5	1982–1983
1982	Garry Sidebottom	43	53	1982–1984
1983	Brett Grimley	18	2	1983–1985
1983	Bill Lokan	87	40	1983–1988
1983	Michael Reeves	40	10	1983–1987
1983	Michael Nettlefold	31	6	1983–1985
1983	Mark Scott	41	57	1983–1985, 1987–1989
1984	Doug Barwick	76	128	1984–1987
1984	Dean Turner	54	19	1984–1986
1984	Graeme Williamson	9	1	1984, 1986
1984	Craig McGrath	58	42	1984–1989
1984	Tim Pekin	107	15	1984–1989
1984	Peter Burke	26	2	1984–1985
1984	Jamie Cooper	26	1	1984–1987
1984	Kevin Taylor	1	1	1984
1984	Bernie Harris	46	60	1984–1986
1984	Graham Osborne	37	8	1984–1989
1985	Andrew Cross	19	12	1985
1985	Darren Murphy	4	0	1985
1985	Paul Tilley	13	1	1985–1986
1985	Tony Spassopoulos	1	0	1985
1985	Gary Keane	55	55	1985–1988
1985	Shane Halas	11	11	1985
1985	Scott McIvor	55	15	1985–1987
1985	Phillip Knight	33	21	1985–1988
1985	Grant Thomas	4	0	1985
1985	Michael Gibson	3	0	1985
1985	David Crutchfield	4	0	1985
1985	Ross Lyon	127	112	1985–1994
1985	John Blakey	135	38	1985–1992
1986	Michael Gale	105	29	1986–1993
1986	Duane Rowe	31	3	1986, 1989–1992
1986	Murray Browne	6	0	1986
1986	Jim Wynd	137	62	1986–1994
1986	Chris Stacey	1	0	1986
1986	Peter McCormack	1	0	1986
1986	David Mitchell	4	2	1986
1986	Mark Dwyer	13	6	1986–1987
1986	Brendan Ryan	1	0	1986
1986	Stuart Cameron	13	2	1986–1988
1986	Darren Bolden	2	2	1986
1987	Matthew Armstrong	132	71	1987–1994
1987	Chris Duthy	3	0	1987
1987	Darren Kappler	87	51	1987–1991
1987	Brett Stephens	133	52	1987–1993
1987	Ken Hinkley	11	21	1987–1988
1987	Keith Thomas	28	15	1987–1988
1987	Mark Trewella	23	4	1987–1990
1987	Michael Roberts	2	1	1987
1987	Darren Handley	10	7	1987–1988
1987	Allan Sidebottom	1	0	1987
1987	Tony Carafa	16	8	1987–1988
1987	Paul McLean	1	0	1987
1987	Jamie Shaw	2	5	1987–1988
1987	Christopher Taylor	1	0	1987
1987	Robert Bolzon	5	3	1987–1988
1987	David Strooper	43	28	1987–1991
1988	Terry Board	15	1	1988, 1990–1991
1988	John Ironmonger	43	8	1988, 1990–1991
1988	Alastair Lynch	120	173	1988–1993
1988	Darren Louttit	2	0	1988
1988	Andrew Brockhurst	38	0	1988–1990
1988	Paul Broderick	93	80	1988–1993
1988	Steven Newman	1	0	1988
1989	Carl Dilena	23	15	1989–1990
1989	Brad Edwards	6	1	1989
1989	Wally Matera	32	39	1989–1990
1989	Brendan McCormack	44	27	1989–1992
1989	Kevin Caton	9	8	1989
1989	Tony Woods	13	4	1989–1990
1989	Peter Bourke	22	3	1989–1991
1989	Darren Wheildon	70	160	1989–1994
1989	Jason Baldwin	125	36	1989–1996
1989	Dean Lupson	6	0	1989–1990

== 1990s ==
Debut year	Player	Games	Goals	Years at club
1990	Roger Delaney	1	0	1990
1990	Dale Kickett	15	13	1990
1990	Chris Waterson	13	7	1990–1991
1990	Mark Athorn	21	0	1990
1990	Matthew Dundas	73	61	1990–1993
1990	Robert Cummings	1	0	1990
1990	Jason Taylor	7	4	1990–1991
1990	Mark Bunn	30	1	1990–1992
1990	Andrew Johnston	9	3	1990–1991
1990	Darren Collins	4	3	1990
1990	Nick Beardsley	1	0	1990
1991	Matthew Bourke	2	2	1991
1991	Joe Cormack	26	17	1991–1992
1991	Brad Davis	5	1	1991, 1993
1991	Brenton Klaebe	5	0	1991
1991	David O'Connell	21	13	1991–1992
1991	Shayne Stevenson	11	9	1991–1993
1991	Jamie Elliott	40	7	1991–1993
1991	Frank Bizzotto	38	4	1991, 1993–1996
1991	Dean Harding	19	25	1991–1993
1991	David Noble	2	0	1991
1991	Peter Caven	39	17	1991–1993
1991	Justin McGrath	8	0	1991
1991	Stephen Paxman	102	18	1991–1996
1991	David Donato	12	2	1991
1991	Darron Wilkinson	1	0	1991
1991	Jamie Bond	1	1	1991
1992	Paul Abbott	26	13	1992–1993
1992	Jeremy Guard	68	17	1992–1995
1992	Paul Morrish	20	1	1992–1993
1992	Marcus Seecamp	51	10	1992–1994
1992	Gavin Exell	5	2	1992
1992	Dale Fleming	13	15	1992–1993
1992	Chris Barrett	4	4	1992
1992	Brad Boyd	70	49	1992–1996
1992	Peter Sartori	23	19	1992–1994
1992	David Johnston	25	1	1992–1994
1992	Ashley Matthews	6	1	1992–1993
1993	Michael Dunstan	38	30	1993–1994
1993	Mark Zanotti	57	8	1993–1995
1993	James Manson	47	20	1993–1995
1993	John McCarthy	71	77	1993–1996
1993	Danny Morton	30	17	1993–1996
1993	Simon Hawking	60	30	1993–1996
1993	Anthony McGregor	41	11	1993–1996
1993	Darren Payne	6	1	1993–1995
1993	Tom Kavanagh	8	1	1993–1994
1994	David Bain	12	4	1994
1994	Trent Cummings	27	18	1994–1996
1994	Jeff Hogg	40	41	1994–1996
1994	Kieran Sporn	12	6	1994
1994	Steven Stretch	25	7	1994–1995
1994	John Barker	47	12	1994–1996
1994	Chris Johnson	59	67	1994–1996
1994	Jarrod Molloy	59	54	1994–1996
1994	Matthew Dent	47	9	1994–1996
1994	Nick Mitchell	9	2	1994–1995
1994	Rowan Warfe	26	1	1994–1996
1994	Brett Cook	25	7	1994–1996
1994	Nigel Palfreyman	1	0	1994
1995	Simon Atkins	41	13	1995–1996
1995	Brett Chandler	28	2	1995–1996
1995	Doug Hawkins †	21	11	1995
1995	Wayne Lamb	19	13	1995–1996
1995	Matthew Manfield	5	0	1995–1996
1995	Martin Pike	36	15	1995–1996
1995	Andrew Cavedon	5	7	1995
1995	Darren Holmes	21	3	1995–1996
1995	Peter Bird	15	7	1995–1996
1995	Adam McCarthy	15	9	1995–1996
1995	Anthony Mellington	24	24	1995–1996
1995	John Rombotis	26	16	1995–1996
1995	Jeff Bruce	7	3	1995
1995	Peter Doyle	12	2	1995–1996
1995	Marty Warry	8	11	1995–1996
1996	Scott Bamford	22	6	1996
1996	Brad Cassidy	14	10	1996
1996	Mick Dwyer	8	3	1996
1996	Matthew Primus	20	5	1996
1996	Nick Carter	17	4	1996
1996	Shane Clayton	13	1	1996
1996	Brent Frewen	2	0	1996
1996	Jason Ramsey	2	0	1996
1996	Robert McMahon	2	1	1996
