= Youlden =

Youlden is an English surname. Notable people with this name include:

- Chris Youlden (1943–2025), English blues singer
- Joe Youlden (1883–1959), Australian rules footballer
- Luke Youlden (born 1978), Australian motor racing driver
- Tommy Youlden, (born 1949), English footballer
