= Peter Connell =

Peter Connell may refer to:

- Peter Connell (cricketer) (born 1981)
- Peter Connell (baseball) (1862–1892)
- Peter Connell (footballer) (1912–1964)
