= Bob Teasdale =

Australian rules footballer

Personal information
- Full name: Robert Haddin Teasdale
- Born: 28 June 1891; Footscray, Victoria
- Died: 24 June 1953 (aged 61); Spotswood, Victoria
- Height: 182 cm (6 ft 0 in)

Playing career^{1}
Years	Club	Games (Goals)
1914	Fitzroy	1 (0)
- ^{1} Playing statistics correct to the end of 1914.

Robert Haddin Teasdale (28 June 1891 – 24 June 1953) was an Australian rules footballer who played with Fitzroy in the Victorian Football League (VFL).
