= Leo Smyth =

Australian rules footballer

Personal information
- Full name: Leo Smyth
- Born: 14 March 1934
- Died: 2 June 1978 (aged 44)
- Height: 169 cm (5 ft 7 in)
- Weight: 66 kg (146 lb)
- Position: Wing / Rover

Playing career^{1}
Years	Club	Games (Goals)
1954–58	Fitzroy	56 (25)
- ^{1} Playing statistics correct to the end of 1958.

Leo Smyth (14 March 1934 – 2 June 1978) was a former Australian rules footballer who played with Fitzroy in the Victorian Football League (VFL).
