= Ern Michel =

Australian rules footballer, born 1903

Personal information
- Full name: Ernest Frederick Michel
- Nickname: Ernie
- Born: 21 March 1903; Preston, Victoria
- Died: 7 July 1983 (aged 80)
- Height: 173 cm (5 ft 8 in)
- Weight: 72 kg (159 lb)

Playing career^{1}
Years	Club	Games (Goals)
1923	Fitzroy	5 (0)
- ^{1} Playing statistics correct to the end of 1923.

Ernest Frederick Michel (21 March 1903 – 7 July 1983) was an Australian rules footballer who played with Fitzroy in the Victorian Football League (VFL).
