= Bill Reeves (footballer) =

Australian rules footballer

Personal information
- Full name: William Reeves
- Born: 22 March 1888; Castlemaine, Victoria
- Died: 23 August 1940 (aged 52); Caulfield, Victoria
- Height: 171 cm (5 ft 7 in)

Playing career^{1}
Years	Club	Games (Goals)
1916	Fitzroy	1 (0)
- ^{1} Playing statistics correct to the end of 1916.

William Reeves (22 March 1888 – 23 August 1940) was an Australian rules footballer who played with Fitzroy in the Victorian Football League (VFL).
