= Mick Mornane =

Australian rules footballer

Personal information
- Full name: Michael Patrick Mornane
- Born: 16 February 1886; Melbourne, Victoria
- Died: 6 March 1939 (aged 53); Fitzroy, Victoria
- Height: 182 cm (6 ft 0 in)

Playing career^{1}
Years	Club	Games (Goals)
1907	Fitzroy	1 (0)
- ^{1} Playing statistics correct to the end of 1907.

Michael Patrick Mornane (16 February 1886 – 6 March 1939) was an Australian rules footballer who played with Fitzroy in the Victorian Football League (VFL).
