= Harold Winberg =

Australian rules footballer, born 1918

Personal information
- Full name: Harold John Winberg
- Born: 25 May 1918; Lilydale, Victoria
- Died: 18 May 1981 (aged 62); East Melbourne, Victoria
- Original team: RAAF / Melbourne Seconds
- Height: 171 cm (5 ft 7 in)
- Weight: 72 kg (159 lb)

Playing career^{1}
Years	Club	Games (Goals)
1943, 1945–46	Fitzroy	32 (12)
1947	North Melbourne	7 (0)
Total		39 (12)
- ^{1} Playing statistics correct to the end of 1947.

Harold John Winberg (25 May 1918 – 18 May 1981) was an Australian rules footballer who played with Fitzroy and North Melbourne in the Victorian Football League (VFL).
