= Jim Renouf =

Australian rules footballer

Personal information
- Full name: James William Renouf
- Born: 29 March 1940
- Died: 26 July 1977 (aged 37)
- Original team: Richmond Reserves
- Height: 180 cm (5 ft 11 in)
- Weight: 81 kg (179 lb)

Playing career^{1}
Years	Club	Games (Goals)
1962	Fitzroy	1 (0)
- ^{1} Playing statistics correct to the end of 1962.

Jim Renouf (29 March 1940 – 26 July 1977) was an Australian rules footballer who played with Fitzroy in the Victorian Football League (VFL).

After his death in a car accident in 1977, Frankston and Port Melbourne played for the Jim Renouf Memorial Trophy.
