= Brian Wicks =

Australian rules footballer

Personal information
- Full name: Brian Wicks
- Born: 10 April 1940 (age 86)
- Original team: Assumption College
- Height: 175 cm (5 ft 9 in)
- Weight: 81 kg (179 lb)

Playing career^{1}
Years	Club	Games (Goals)
1960–62	Fitzroy	8 (0)
1962	North Melbourne	5 (5)
Total		13 (5)
- ^{1} Playing statistics correct to the end of 1962.

Brian Wicks (born 10 April 1940) is a former Australian rules footballer who played with Fitzroy and North Melbourne in the Victorian Football League (VFL).
