= Bill Bunworth =

Australian rules footballer, born 1914

Personal information
- Full name: Bill Bunworth
- Born: 6 June 1914
- Died: 14 July 1998 (aged 84)
- Original team: East Brunswick
- Height: 183 cm (6 ft 0 in)
- Weight: 83 kg (183 lb)

Playing career^{1}
Years	Club	Games (Goals)
1937–38	Fitzroy	18 (4)
- ^{1} Playing statistics correct to the end of 1938.

Bill Bunworth (6 June 1914 – 14 July 1998) was an Australian rules footballer who played with Fitzroy in the Victorian Football League (VFL).
