= Bill Smith (Australian rules footballer) =

Australian rules footballer

Personal information
- Full name: Bill Smith
- Born: 17 December 1936
- Died: 9 November 2010 (aged 73)
- Original team: Noble Park
- Height: 182 cm (6 ft 0 in)
- Weight: 79 kg (174 lb)

Playing career^{1}
Years	Club	Games (Goals)
1955	Fitzroy	2 (0)
- ^{1} Playing statistics correct to the end of 1955.

Bill Smith (17 December 1936 – 9 November 2010) was a former Australian rules footballer who played with Fitzroy in the Victorian Football League (VFL).
