= Bob McHenry (footballer) =

Australian rules footballer (1919–2003)

Personal information
- Full name: Jonathan Robert McHenry
- Born: 19 October 1919; Ballarat, Victoria
- Died: 21 January 2003 (aged 83); North Geelong, Victoria
- Height: 168 cm (5 ft 6 in)
- Weight: 75 kg (165 lb)

Playing career^{1}
Years	Club	Games (Goals)
1943	Fitzroy	5 (2)
1944	Geelong	10 (1)
Total		15 (3)
- ^{1} Playing statistics correct to the end of 1944.

Jonathan Robert McHenry (19 October 1919 – 21 January 2003) was an Australian rules footballer who played with Fitzroy and Geelong in the Victorian Football League (VFL).
