= Graeme Weatherley =

Australian rules footballer

Personal information
- Full name: Graeme Weatherley
- Born: 17 June 1955 (age 71)
- Original team: Preston Swimmers
- Height: 191 cm (6 ft 3 in)
- Weight: 93 kg (205 lb)

Playing career^{1}
Years	Club	Games (Goals)
1974–1975	Fitzroy	14 (16)
- ^{1} Playing statistics correct to the end of 1975.

Graeme Weatherley is a former Australian rules footballer, who played for the Fitzroy Football Club in the Victorian Football League (VFL).
