= Bruce Bridges =

Australian rules footballer, born 1917

Personal information
- Full name: Bruce Ernest Bridges
- Born: 7 August 1917; Perth, Western Australia
- Died: 26 October 1999 (aged 82)
- Original team: West Perth
- Height: 173 cm (5 ft 8 in)
- Weight: 74 kg (163 lb)

Playing career^{1}
| Years | Club | Games (Goals) |
| 1938–41, 45–47 | West Perth | 13 (8) |
| 1942 | Fitzroy | 3 (0) |
- ^{1} Playing statistics correct to the end of 1947.

Bruce Ernest Bridges (7 August 1917 – 26 October 1999) was an Australian rules footballer who played with Fitzroy in the Victorian Football League (VFL) and West Perth in the West Australian Football League (WAFL).

Bridges commenced his senior football career in the West Australian Football League, playing eight games over four seasons for West Perth.

In 1942 he enlisted in the Australian Army and served until the end of World War II. While he was training with the Army he played three games for Fitzroy during the 1942 VFL season.

After the war he returned to Perth and played a further five games for West Perth.
