= Norm Richardson (footballer) =

Australian rules footballer

Personal information
- Full name: Robert Norman Richardson
- Born: 3 March 1882; St Kilda, Victoria
- Died: 10 March 1949 (aged 67); Royal Park, Melbourne
- Original team: South Yarra
- Height: 170 cm (5 ft 7 in)

Playing career^{1}
Years	Club	Games (Goals)
1909	Fitzroy	1 (0)
- ^{1} Playing statistics correct to the end of 1909.

Robert Norman Richardson (3 March 1882 – 10 March 1949) was an Australian rules footballer who played with Fitzroy in the Victorian Football League (VFL).
