= Michael Poynton =

Australian rules footballer

Personal information
- Full name: Michael Poynton
- Born: 15 May 1961 (age 65)
- Original team: East Doncaster
- Height: 180 cm (5 ft 11 in)
- Weight: 70 kg (154 lb)
- Position: Half forward

Playing career^{1}
Years	Club	Games (Goals)
1979–83	Fitzroy	52 (66)
1985–86	North Adelaide	25 (62)
- ^{1} Playing statistics correct to the end of 1983.

Michael Poynton (born 15 May 1961) is a former Australian rules footballer who played with Fitzroy in the Victorian Football League (VFL) and North Adelaide in the South Australian National Football League (SANFL).
