= Kevin Oakley =

Australian rules footballer

Personal information
- Full name: Kevin Oakley
- Born: 19 April 1944
- Height: 191 cm (6 ft 3 in)
- Weight: 83 kg (183 lb)

Playing career^{1}
Years	Club	Games (Goals)
1966	Fitzroy	10 (1)
- ^{1} Playing statistics correct to the end of 1966.

Kevin Oakley (born 19 April 1944) is a former Australian rules footballer who played with Fitzroy in the Victorian Football League (VFL).
