= Wally Gray =

Australian rules footballer, born 1909

Personal information
- Full name: Wally Gray
- Born: 12 December 1909
- Died: 17 July 1950 (aged 40)
- Original team: Preston
- Height: 173 cm (5 ft 8 in)
- Weight: 73 kg (161 lb)
- Position: Defence

Playing career^{1}
Years	Club	Games (Goals)
1931–32	Richmond	3 (0)
1932–38	Fitzroy	87 (4)
Total		90 (4)
- ^{1} Playing statistics correct to the end of 1938.

Wally Gray (12 December 1909 – 17 July 1950) was a former Australian rules footballer who played with Richmond and Fitzroy in the Victorian Football League (VFL).
