= Jim Tagell =

Australian rules footballer, born 1914

Personal information
- Full name: James Tagell
- Born: 17 December 1914; Footscray, Victoria
- Died: 1 December 1973 (aged 58); Flinders, Victoria
- Original team: Auburn
- Height: 169 cm (5 ft 7 in)
- Weight: 80 kg (176 lb)

Playing career^{1}
Years	Club	Games (Goals)
1939–40	Fitzroy	9 (7)
- ^{1} Playing statistics correct to the end of 1940.

James Tagell (17 December 1914 – 1 December 1973) was an Australian rules footballer who played with Fitzroy in the Victorian Football League (VFL).

Tagell later served in the Australian Army during World War II.
