= Ron Smith (Australian footballer, born 1934) =

Australian rules footballer (1934–2008)

Personal information
- Full name: Ron Smith
- Born: 13 September 1934
- Died: 1 October 2008 (aged 74)
- Original team: Preston District Junior Association
- Height: 180 cm (5 ft 11 in)
- Weight: 76 kg (168 lb)

Playing career^{1}
Years	Club	Games (Goals)
1955–56	Fitzroy	9 (0)
- ^{1} Playing statistics correct to the end of 1956.

Ron Smith (13 September 1934 – 1 October 2008) was an Australian rules footballer who played with Fitzroy in the Victorian Football League (VFL).
