= Bill Turner (Australian footballer, born 1901) =

Australian rules footballer

Personal information
- Full name: William G. Turner
- Born: 6 December 1901
- Died: 3 January 1967 (aged 65)
- Height: 178 cm (5 ft 10 in)
- Weight: 73 kg (161 lb)

Playing career^{1}
Years	Club	Games (Goals)
1924	Fitzroy	3 (1)
- ^{1} Playing statistics correct to the end of 1924.

Bill Turner (6 December 1901 – 3 January 1967) was an Australian rules footballer who played with Fitzroy in the Victorian Football League (VFL).
