= Willis Reeve =

Australian rules footballer, born 1905

Personal information
- Full name: Willis Leonard Burton Reeve
- Born: 29 April 1905; Mandalay, British Burma
- Died: 6 September 2001 (aged 96); Carrum, Victoria
- Height: 184 cm (6 ft 0 in)
- Weight: 82 kg (181 lb)
- Position: Fullback

Playing career^{1}
Years	Club	Games (Goals)
1927–32	Fitzroy	86 (0)
- ^{1} Playing statistics correct to the end of 1932.

Willis Leonard Burton Reeve (29 April 1905 – 6 September 2001) was an Australian rules footballer who played with Fitzroy in the Victorian Football League (VFL).

The eldest son of British Army Sergeant Leonard Reeve (1866–1955) and Grace Marie Reeve, née Weston (1881–1948), Willis Reeve was born in what was then British Burma on 29 April 1905. The Reeve family migrated to Australia in 1911.

Reeve later served in the Royal Australian Air Force during World War II.
