= Graeme Hinchen =

Australian rules footballer

Personal information
- Full name: Graeme Hinchen
- Born: 18 January 1960 (age 66)
- Original team: New Norfolk
- Height: 179 cm (5 ft 10 in)
- Weight: 77 kg (170 lb)
- Position: Back pocket

Playing career^{1}
Years	Club	Games (Goals)
1981–87	Fitzroy	77 (3)
- ^{1} Playing statistics correct to the end of 1987.

Graeme Hinchen (born 18 January 1960) is a former Australian rules footballer who played with Fitzroy in the Victorian Football League (VFL).
