= Wally Mutimer =

Australian rules footballer, born 1907

Personal information
- Full name: Walter Robert Mutimer
- Born: 30 July 1907; Carlton North, Victoria
- Died: 14 October 1984 (aged 77); Parkville, Victoria
- Original team: Brunswick
- Height: 183 cm (6 ft 0 in)
- Weight: 84.5 kg (186 lb)

Playing career^{1}
Years	Club	Games (Goals)
1934–36	Carlton	21 (6)
1937–38	Fitzroy	27 (10)
Total		48 (16)
- ^{1} Playing statistics correct to the end of 1938.

Walter Robert Mutimer (30 July 1907 – 14 October 1984) was an Australian rules footballer who played with Carlton and Fitzroy in the Victorian Football League (VFL).

== Family ==
The son of Henry Basil Mutimer (1865-1944), and Mary Selina Mutimer (1864-1952), née Stephens, Walter Robert Mutimer was born in Carlton North, Victoria on 30 July 1907.

He married Alice May Sheppard (1908-1994) on 15 April 1926.
