= Billy Wilson (footballer, born 1891) =

Australian rules footballer

Personal information
- Full name: William James Wilson
- Born: 21 November 1891; Brunswick, Victoria
- Died: 9 February 1957 (aged 65); Parkville, Victoria
- Original team: Fitzroy Juniors

Playing career^{1}
Years	Club	Games (Goals)
1913–14	Fitzroy	9 (3)
1915–19	Northcote (VFA)	32 (21)
- ^{1} Playing statistics correct to the end of 1919.

William James Wilson (21 November 1891 – 9 February 1957) was an Australian rules footballer who played with Fitzroy in the Victorian Football League (VFL).
