= Jim Wynd =

Australian rules footballer and manager

Personal information
- Full name: James Wynd
- Born: 11 November 1964 (age 61)
- Original team: Regent Scouts
- Height: 177 cm (5 ft 10 in)
- Weight: 72 kg (159 lb)

Playing career^{1}
Years	Club	Games (Goals)
1986–1994	Fitzroy	137 (62)
- ^{1} Playing statistics correct to the end of 1994.

James Wynd (born 11 November 1964) is a former Australian rules footballer who played for Fitzroy in the Victorian Football League (VFL) and Australian Football League (AFL).

Wynd played 137 VFL/AFL matches for Fitzroy between 1986 and 1994, including 2 games for Victoria (Big V) in 1989 and 1991. He then went on to play for Central Districts in the South Australian National Football League (SANFL).

He is now a senior manager with the Centre for Multicultural Youth in Victoria.
