= Paul O'Brien (Australian footballer, born 1948) =

Australian rules footballer

Personal information
- Full name: Paul S. O'Brien
- Born: 19 August 1948 (age 78)
- Height: 188 cm (6 ft 2 in)
- Weight: 82.5 kg (182 lb)

Playing career^{1}
Years	Club	Games (Goals)
1966–1969	Fitzroy	47 (2)
- ^{1} Playing statistics correct to the end of 1969.

Paul S. O'Brien (born 19 August 1948) is a former Australian rules footballer who played with Fitzroy in the Victorian Football League (VFL).
