= Ross King (footballer) =

Australian rules footballer

Personal information
- Full name: Michael William King
- Born: 11 June 1943
- Died: 28 June 2016 (aged 73)
- Original team: Perth
- Height: 188 cm (6 ft 2 in)
- Weight: 80 kg (176 lb)

Playing career^{1}
Years	Club	Games (Goals)
1964	Fitzroy	2 (1)
1968	East Perth (WAFL)	1 (0)
- ^{1} Playing statistics correct to the end of 1968.

Michael William "Ross" King (11 June 1943 – 28 June 2016) was an Australian rules footballer who played with Fitzroy in the Victorian Football League (VFL) and East Perth in the West Australian Football League (WAFL).
