= Alby Sheehan =

Australian rules footballer

Personal information
- Full name: Albert Sheehan
- Born: 8 November 1887; Melbourne, Victoria
- Died: 25 April 1954 (aged 66); Hobart, Tasmania
- Original team: Clear Hills
- Height: 177 cm (5 ft 10 in)

Playing career^{1}
Years	Club	Games (Goals)
1911	Fitzroy	1 (0)
- ^{1} Playing statistics correct to the end of 1911.

Albert Sheehan (8 November 1887 – 25 April 1954) was an Australian rules footballer who played for the Fitzroy Football Club in the Victorian Football League (VFL).
