= Gordon Dennis =

Australian rules footballer, born 1919

Personal information
- Full name: Gordon Dennis
- Born: 18 April 1919
- Died: 10 March 1998 (aged 78)
- Height: 188 cm (6 ft 2 in)
- Weight: 86 kg (190 lb)

Playing career^{1}
Years	Club	Games (Goals)
1938–39	Fitzroy	9 (4)
- ^{1} Playing statistics correct to the end of 1939.

Gordon Dennis (18 April 1919 – 10 March 1998) was an Australian rules footballer who played with Fitzroy in the Victorian Football League (VFL).
