= Jimmy Luff =

Australian rules footballer

Personal information
- Full name: James Entwistle Luff
- Born: 9 May 1887; Hawthorn, Victoria
- Died: 5 October 1960 (aged 73); Highett, Victoria
- Height: 175 cm (5 ft 9 in)

Playing career^{1}
Years	Club	Games (Goals)
1906	Fitzroy	2 (0)
- ^{1} Playing statistics correct to the end of 1906.

James Entwistle Luff (9 May 1887 – 5 October 1960) was an Australian rules footballer who played with Fitzroy in the Victorian Football League (VFL).
