= Bert Minney =

Australian rules footballer, born 1914

Personal information
- Full name: Bert Minney
- Born: 7 January 1914
- Died: 20 May 1999 (aged 85)
- Original team: East Brunswick
- Height: 178 cm (5 ft 10 in)
- Weight: 77 kg (170 lb)

Playing career^{1}
Years	Club	Games (Goals)
1938–1939	Fitzroy	18 (0)
- ^{1} Playing statistics correct to the end of 1939.

Bert Minney (7 January 1914 – 20 May 1999) was an Australian rules footballer who played for the Fitzroy Football Club in the Victorian Football League (VFL).
