= Doug Parks =

Australian rules footballer

Douglas Lindsay Parks

Personal information
- Full name: Douglas Lindsay Parks
- Born: 21 June 1899; Romsey, Victoria
- Died: 18 June 1984 (aged 84); Castlemaine
- Height: 190.5 cm (6 ft 3 in)

Playing career^{1}
Years	Club	Games (Goals)
1924	Fitzroy	1 (1)
- ^{1} Playing statistics correct to the end of 1924.

Douglas Lindsay Parks (21 June 1899 – 18 June 1984) was an Australian rules footballer who played with Fitzroy in the Victorian Football League (VFL).
