= Ron Kinder =

Australian rules footballer

Personal information
- Full name: Ron Kinder
- Born: 18 August 1924
- Died: 30 May 2013 (aged 88)
- Original team: Northcote
- Height: 175 cm (5 ft 9 in)
- Weight: 76 kg (168 lb)

Playing career^{1}
Years	Club	Games (Goals)
1948	Fitzroy	5 (1)
- ^{1} Playing statistics correct to the end of 1948.

Ron Kinder (18 August 1924 – 30 May 2013) was an Australian rules footballer who played with Fitzroy in the Victorian Football League (VFL).
