= Andrew Veal =

Australian footballer

Personal information
- Full name: Andrew Veal
- Born: 11 May 1961 (age 65)
- Original team: Heidelberg West
- Height: 183 cm (6 ft 0 in)
- Weight: 76 kg (168 lb)

Playing career^{1}
Years	Club	Games (Goals)
1980	Fitzroy	6 (0)
- ^{1} Playing statistics correct to the end of 1980.

Andrew Veal is a former Australian rules footballer, who played for the Fitzroy Football Club in the Victorian Football League (VFL).

== Career ==
Veal played six games for Fitzroy in the 1980 season, without scoring.
