= Reg Smith (Australian footballer) =

Australian rules footballer, born 1902

Personal information
- Full name: Reginald Smith
- Born: 13 March 1902
- Died: 8 November 1963 (aged 61)
- Height: 183 cm (6 ft 0 in)
- Weight: 76 kg (168 lb)

Playing career^{1}
Years	Club	Games (Goals)
1925	Fitzroy	6 (4)
- ^{1} Playing statistics correct to the end of 1925.

Reg Smith (13 March 1902 – 8 November 1963) was an Australian rules footballer who played with Fitzroy in the Victorian Football League (VFL).
