= Leo Hicks =

Australian rules footballer, born 1916

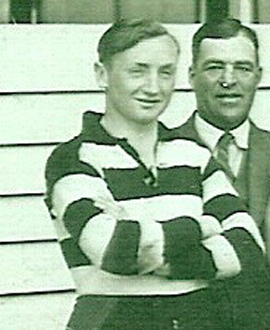
- Hicks in 1943

Personal information
- Full name: Thomas Leo Hicks
- Born: 24 January 1916; Yarrawonga, Victoria
- Died: 17 March 2005 (aged 89)
- Original team: Yarrawonga
- Height: 175 cm (5 ft 9 in)
- Weight: 71.5 kg (158 lb)

Playing career^{1}
Years	Club	Games (Goals)
1942	Fitzroy	4 (0)
1943	Collingwood	1 (1)
Total		5 (1)
- ^{1} Playing statistics correct to the end of 1943.

Thomas Leo Hicks (24 January 1916 – 17 March 2005) was an Australian rules footballer who played with Fitzroy and Collingwood in the Victorian Football League (VFL).
