= Les Prior =

Australian rules footballer, born 1908

Personal information
- Full name: Leslie Melvin Prior
- Born: 30 March 1908; Broken Hill, New South Wales
- Died: 8 September 1972 (aged 64); Red Cliffs, Victoria
- Height: 170 cm (5 ft 7 in)
- Weight: 61 kg (134 lb)

Playing career^{1}
Years	Club	Games (Goals)
1931	Fitzroy	12 (11)
- ^{1} Playing statistics correct to the end of 1931.

Leslie Melvin Prior (30 March 1908 – 8 September 1972) was an Australian rules footballer who played with Fitzroy in the Victorian Football League (VFL).
