= Hector McNeil (footballer) =

Australian rules footballer, born 1901

Personal information
- Full name: Hector McNeil
- Born: 8 November 1901
- Died: 15 July 1969 (aged 67)
- Height: 183 cm (6 ft 0 in)
- Weight: 83 kg (183 lb)

Playing career^{1}
Years	Club	Games (Goals)
1922	Fitzroy	7 (2)
- ^{1} Playing statistics correct to the end of 1922.

Hector McNeil (8 November 1901 – 15 July 1969) was an Australian rules footballer who played with Fitzroy in the Victorian Football League (VFL).
