= Alf Taggart =

Australian rules footballer, born 1907

Personal information
- Full name: Alfred Edward Taggart
- Born: 19 August 1907; Fitzroy North, Victoria
- Died: 11 July 1983 (aged 75); Camperdown, Victoria
- Original team: North Fitzroy Juniors

Playing career^{1}
Years	Club	Games (Goals)
1932	Fitzroy	3 (0)
- ^{1} Playing statistics correct to the end of 1932.

Alfred Edward Taggart (19 August 1907 – 11 July 1983) was an Australian rules footballer who played for the Fitzroy Football Club in the Victorian Football League (VFL).

Taggart later served in the Royal Australian Air Force during World War II.
