= Reg Trigg =

Australian rules footballer, born 1916

Personal information
- Full name: Reginald Percival Trigg
- Born: 12 July 1916; Geelong, Victoria
- Died: 22 April 2002 (aged 85)
- Original team: Parkside
- Height: 174 cm (5 ft 9 in)
- Weight: 73 kg (161 lb)

Playing career^{1}
| Years | Club | Games (Goals) |
| 1937–38 | Fitzroy | 4 (8) |
- ^{1} Playing statistics correct to the end of 1938.

Reginald Percival Trigg (12 July 1916 – 22 April 2002) was an Australian rules footballer who played with Fitzroy in the Victorian Football League (VFL).

== Football ==
Trigg made his senior debut for Fitzroy late in the 1937 season, scoring three goals in a game against South Melbourne and then scoring again against Essendon in the next round.

He played two further senior games for Fitzroy early in the 1938 season before being cleared to VFA side Northcote in the middle of the year.

== World War II ==
Trigg served in the Australian Army during World War II. After a year of service he was placed in the Army Reserve for medical reasons.
