= Bill Walford =

Australian rules footballer

Personal information
- Full name: William John Walford
- Born: 11 August 1947
- Died: 5 November 2014 (aged 67)
- Original team: Essex Heights
- Height: 191 cm (6 ft 3 in)
- Weight: 91 kg (201 lb)

Playing career^{1}
Years	Club	Games (Goals)
1965–66	Richmond	8 (1)
1968	Fitzroy	11 (16)
Total		19 (17)
- ^{1} Playing statistics correct to the end of 1968.

Bill Walford (11 August 1947 – 5 November 2014) was an Australian rules footballer who played with Richmond and Fitzroy in the Victorian Football League (VFL).
