= Reg Hammond =

Australian rules footballer

Personal information
- Full name: Reg Hammond
- Born: 15 June 1920
- Died: 19 September 1981 (aged 61)
- Original team: Orbost
- Height: 192 cm (6 ft 4 in)
- Weight: 89 kg (196 lb)

Playing career^{1}
Years	Club	Games (Goals)
1942	Fitzroy	1 (2)
- ^{1} Playing statistics correct to the end of 1942.

Reg Hammond (15 June 1920 – 19 September 1981) was a former Australian rules footballer who played with Fitzroy in the Victorian Football League (VFL).
