= Bob Robinson (Australian footballer) =

Best footballer, born 1914

Personal information
- Full name: Robert Ernest Robinson
- Born: 21 May 1914; Narrogin, Western Australia
- Died: 1 March 2001 (aged 86)
- Original team: West Perth
- Height: 183 cm (6 ft 0 in)
- Weight: 71 kg (157 lb)

Playing career^{1}
Years	Club	Games (Goals)
1939	West Perth	1 (0)
1941–42	Fitzroy	5 (7)
- ^{1} Playing statistics correct to the end of 1942.

Robert Ernest Robinson (21 May 1914 – 1 March 2001) was an Australian rules footballer who played with Fitzroy in the Victorian Football League (VFL) and West Perth in the West Australian Football League (WAFL).

After playing a single game for West Perth in 1939, Robinson played five games for Fitzroy during the early days of his service in the Royal Australian Air Force in World War II.
