= Gary Ebbels =

Australian rules footballer

Personal information
- Full name: Gary Ebbels
- Born: 16 March 1947 (age 79)
- Original team: East Ballarat
- Height: 180 cm (5 ft 11 in)
- Weight: 75 kg (165 lb)

Playing career^{1}
Years	Club	Games (Goals)
1967–68	Fitzroy	8 (7)
- ^{1} Playing statistics correct to the end of 1968.

Gary Ebbels (born 16 March 1947) is a former Australian rules footballer who played with Fitzroy in the Victorian Football League (VFL) in 1967 and 1968.

Ebbels was a physical education teacher in Ballarat at Sebastopol Technical School, later known as Sebastopol College, for 44 years. He retired in 2011.
