= Don Hutchins (Australian footballer) =

Australian rules footballer (1898–1976)

Personal information
- Full name: Donald Hutchins
- Born: 2 April 1898
- Died: 1 August 1976 (aged 78)
- Height: 168 cm (5 ft 6 in)

Playing career^{1}
Years	Club	Games (Goals)
1920	Fitzroy	1 (2)
- ^{1} Playing statistics correct to the end of 1920.

Don Hutchins (2 April 1898 – 1 August 1976) was an Australian rules footballer who played with Fitzroy in the Victorian Football League (VFL).
