= Shane Gilmore =

Australian rules footballer

Personal information
- Full name: Shane Gilmore
- Born: 13 June 1958 (age 68)
- Original team: Bulleen-Templestowe
- Height: 183 cm (6 ft 0 in)
- Weight: 76 kg (168 lb)

Playing career^{1}
| Years | Club | Games (Goals) |
| 1977 | Fitzroy | 4 (0) |
- ^{1} Playing statistics correct to the end of 1977.

Shane Gilmore is a former Australian rules footballer, who played for the Fitzroy Football Club in the Victorian Football League (VFL).
