= Eddie Tucker (footballer) =

Australian rules footballer

Personal information
- Full name: Eddie Tucker
- Born: 24 June 1932
- Original team: Carlton Colts
- Height: 171 cm (5 ft 7 in)
- Weight: 72 kg (159 lb)

Playing career^{1}
Years	Club	Games (Goals)
1954	Fitzroy	4 (1)
- ^{1} Playing statistics correct to the end of 1954.

Eddie Tucker (born 24 June 1932) is a former Australian rules footballer who played with Fitzroy in the Victorian Football League (VFL).
