= Jack Edgeley =

Australian rules footballer

Personal information
- Full name: John Edgeley
- Born: 21 March 1887; Poplar, London, England
- Died: 18 April 1944 (aged 57); Thornbury, Victoria
- Original team: Collingwood juniors
- Height: 168 cm (5 ft 6 in)

Playing career^{1}
Years	Club	Games (Goals)
1907–1908	Fitzroy	8 (1)
- ^{1} Playing statistics correct to the end of 1908.

Jack Edgeley (21 March 1887 – 18 April 1944) was an Australian rules footballer who played with Fitzroy in the Victorian Football League (VFL).
