= John Formosa (footballer) =

Australian rules footballer

Personal information
- Full name: John Formosa
- Born: 13 November 1954 (age 71)
- Original team: North Reservoir
- Height: 188 cm (6 ft 2 in)
- Weight: 81 kg (179 lb)

Playing career^{1}
Years	Club	Games (Goals)
1972–1975	Fitzroy	15 (2)
- ^{1} Playing statistics correct to the end of 1975.

John Formosa is a former Australian rules footballer, who played for the Fitzroy Football Club in the Victorian Football League (VFL).
