= Sam Baker (Australian footballer) =

Australian rules footballer

Personal information
- Full name: Samuel Gilbert Henry Baker
- Born: 2 October 1874; Collingwood, Victoria
- Died: 2 January 1946 (aged 71); Wahroonga, New South Wales
- Original team: Collingwood Juniors

Playing career^{1}
Years	Club	Games (Goals)
1902–03	Fitzroy	6 (0)
- ^{1} Playing statistics correct to the end of 1903.

Samuel Gilbert Henry Baker (2 October 1874 – 2 January 1946) was an Australian rules footballer who played with Fitzroy in the Victorian Football League (VFL).
