= Sam Davison =

Australian rules footballer

Personal information
- Full name: Samuel Roberts Davison
- Born: 23 February 1884; Fitzroy, Victoria
- Died: 17 January 1963 (aged 78)
- Original team: Preston
- Height: 177 cm (5 ft 10 in)

Playing career^{1}
Years	Club	Games (Goals)
1905	Fitzroy	2 (0)
- ^{1} Playing statistics correct to the end of 1905.

Samuel Roberts Davison (23 February 1884 – 17 January 1963) was an Australian rules footballer who played with Fitzroy in the Victorian Football League (VFL).
