= Reg Carr (footballer) =

Australian rules footballer

Personal information
- Full name: Reg Carr
- Born: 3 October 1934
- Died: 20 October 2011 (aged 77)
- Original team: Reservoir
- Height: 179 cm (5 ft 10 in)
- Weight: 81 kg (179 lb)

Playing career^{1}
Years	Club	Games (Goals)
1954–56	Fitzroy	20 (0)
- ^{1} Playing statistics correct to the end of 1956.

Reg Carr (3 October 1934 – 20 October 2011) was an Australian rules footballer who played with Fitzroy in the Victorian Football League (VFL).
