= Dave Chivers =

Australian rules footballer

Personal information
- Full name: David Chivers
- Born: 25 January 1936
- Original team: Templestowe
- Height: 185 cm (6 ft 1 in)
- Weight: 86 kg (190 lb)

Playing career^{1}
Years	Club	Games (Goals)
1956–57	Fitzroy	7 (0)
- ^{1} Playing statistics correct to the end of 1957.

Dave Chivers (born 25 January 1936) is a former Australian rules footballer who played with Fitzroy in the Victorian Football League (VFL).
