= Len Stott =

Australian rules footballer, born 1909

Personal information
- Full name: Leonard Wilbur Stott
- Born: 16 November 1909; Geelong
- Died: 7 May 2000 (aged 90); Heildelburg
- Original team: Preston
- Height: 178 cm (5 ft 10 in)
- Weight: 73 kg (161 lb)
- Position: Midfield

Playing career^{1}
Years	Club	Games (Goals)
1932–37	Fitzroy	62 (16)
- ^{1} Playing statistics correct to the end of 1937.

Len Stott (16 November 1909 – 7 May 2000) was a former Australian rules footballer who played with Fitzroy in the Victorian Football League (VFL).
