= Frank O'Keefe (footballer) =

Australian rules footballer

Personal information
- Full name: Francis Joseph O'Keefe
- Born: 24 April 1898; South Melbourne, Victoria
- Died: 26 June 1958 (aged 60); Heidelberg, Victoria
- Height: 184 cm (6 ft 0 in)
- Weight: 82 kg (181 lb)

Playing career^{1}
Years	Club	Games (Goals)
1916	Fitzroy	1 (1)
- ^{1} Playing statistics correct to the end of 1916.

Francis Joseph O'Keefe (24 April 1898 – 26 June 1958) was an Australian rules footballer who played with Fitzroy in the Victorian Football League (VFL).
