= Graeme Shearer =

Australian rules footballer

Personal information
- Full name: Graeme Shearer
- Born: 29 September 1948
- Died: 10 July 1983 (aged 34)
- Original team: Preston Scouts
- Height: 180 cm (5 ft 11 in)
- Weight: 76 kg (168 lb)

Playing career^{1}
Years	Club	Games (Goals)
1968–70	Fitzroy	19 (5)
- ^{1} Playing statistics correct to the end of 1970.

Graeme Shearer (29 September 1948 – 10 July 1983) was an Australian rules footballer who played with Fitzroy in the Victorian Football League (VFL).
