= Peter Johnston (footballer, born 1959) =

Australian rules footballer

Personal information
- Full name: Peter Anthony Johnston
- Born: 26 April 1959 (age 67)
- Height: 191 cm (6 ft 3 in)
- Weight: 83 kg (183 lb)

Playing career^{1}
Years	Club	Games (Goals)
1977; 1979	Fitzroy	8 (9)
- ^{1} Playing statistics correct to the end of 1979.

Peter Anthony Johnston (born 26 April 1959) is a former Australian rules footballer, who played for the Fitzroy Football Club in the Victorian Football League (VFL).
