= Tom Willoughby =

Australian rules footballer

Personal information
- Full name: Thomas Willoughby
- Born: 22 February 1889; Ballarat East, Victoria
- Died: 19 August 1964 (aged 75); Perth, Western Australia
- Original team: Perth
- Height: 180 cm (5 ft 11 in)
- Weight: 82 kg (181 lb)

Playing career^{1}
Years	Club	Games (Goals)
1912–14	Fitzroy	38 (22)
- ^{1} Playing statistics correct to the end of 1914.

Thomas Raymond Willoughby (22 February 1889 – 19 August 1964) was an Australian rules footballer who played with Fitzroy in the Victorian Football League (VFL).
