= Stan Whitmore =

Australian rules footballer (1936–2018)

Personal information
- Full name: Stan Whitmore
- Born: 30 October 1936
- Died: 15 December 2018 (aged 82)
- Original team: Preston Swimmers
- Height: 183 cm (6 ft 0 in)
- Weight: 76 kg (168 lb)

Playing career^{1}
| Years | Club | Games (Goals) |
| 1957 | Fitzroy | 4 (0) |
- ^{1} Playing statistics correct to the end of 1957.

Stan Whitmore (30 October 1936 – 15 December 2018) was an Australian rules footballer who played with Fitzroy in the Victorian Football League (VFL).
