= Norm Barker =

Australian rules footballer

Personal information
- Full name: John Norman Barker
- Born: 1 July 1893; Fitzroy, Victoria
- Died: 27 October 1984 (aged 91); Baxter, Victoria
- Original team: University High School
- Height: 165 cm (5 ft 5 in)

Playing career^{1}
Years	Club	Games (Goals)
1913	University	1 (0)
1917	Fitzroy	2 (0)
Total		3 (0)
- ^{1} Playing statistics correct to the end of 1917.

John Norman Barker (1 July 1893 – 27 October 1984) was an Australian rules footballer who played in the Victorian Football League (VFL).

Barker played one game for University in 1913, but studies took over his years as a footballer. He returned in 1917 for Fitzroy Football Club, but managed only two more VFL games. He was the younger brother of Gilbert Barker, who also played for Fitzroy and University.
