= Bernie Brophy (footballer) =

Australian rules footballer

Personal information
- Full name: Bernard James Brophy
- Born: 3 January 1889; Carlton North, Victoria
- Died: 24 July 1965 (aged 76); Armadale, Victoria
- Height: 180 cm (5 ft 11 in)

Playing career^{1}
Years	Club	Games (Goals)
1909	Fitzroy	1 (1)
- ^{1} Playing statistics correct to the end of 1909.

Bernard James Brophy (3 January 1889 – 24 July 1965) was an Australian rules footballer who played for the Fitzroy Football Club in the Victorian Football League (VFL).
