= Terry O'Mara =

Australian rules footballer

Personal information
- Full name: Terrence Anthony O'Mara
- Born: 24 February 1941
- Died: 13 August 1998 (aged 57); Sunbury, Victoria
- Original team: West Preston
- Height: 185 cm (6 ft 1 in)
- Weight: 86 kg (190 lb)

Playing career^{1}
| Years | Club | Games (Goals) |
| 1963–65 | Fitzroy | 20 (1) |
- ^{1} Playing statistics correct to the end of 1965.

Terrence Anthony O'Mara (24 February 1941 – 13 August 1998) was an Australian rules footballer who played with Fitzroy in the Victorian Football League (VFL).
