= Peter Williams (Australian footballer, born 1944) =

Australian rules footballer

Personal information
- Full name: Peter R. Williams
- Born: 10 October 1944 (age 82)
- Original team: Wonthaggi
- Height: 178 cm (5 ft 10 in)
- Weight: 73 kg (161 lb)

Playing career^{1}
Years	Club	Games (Goals)
1965–1966	Fitzroy	7 (2)
- ^{1} Playing statistics correct to the end of 1966.

Peter Williams (born 10 October 1944) is a former Australian rules footballer who played with Fitzroy in the Victorian Football League (VFL).

A Wonthaggi recruit, Williams played seven senior games for Fitzroy, four in the 1965 VFL season and three in the 1966 season. He was used as a half forward and rover.
