= Alan Chipp =

Australian rules footballer

Personal information
- Full name: Alan Chipp
- Born: 9 January 1937 (age 89)
- Original team: West Heidelberg
- Height: 181 cm (5 ft 11 in)
- Weight: 73 kg (161 lb)

Playing career^{1}
Years	Club	Games (Goals)
1957	Fitzroy	1 (0)
- ^{1} Playing statistics correct to the end of 1957.

Alan Chipp (born 9 January 1937) is a former Australian rules footballer who played for the Fitzroy Football Club in the Victorian Football League (VFL). He is a younger brother of politician Don Chipp.
