= Bill Storer (footballer) =

Australian rules footballer

Personal information
- Full name: Bill Storer
- Born: 7 February 1942
- Original team: Swan Hill
- Height: 180 cm (5 ft 11 in)
- Weight: 78 kg (172 lb)

Playing career^{1}
Years	Club	Games (Goals)
1963–64	Fitzroy	9 (7)
- ^{1} Playing statistics correct to the end of 1964.

Bill Storer (born 7 February 1942) is a former Australian rules footballer who played with Fitzroy in the Victorian Football League (VFL).
