= Eddie Schenk =

Australian rules footballer, born 1903

Personal information
- Full name: Horace Edward Schenk
- Born: 12 March 1903; Warrenheip, Victoria
- Died: 7 July 1974 (aged 71); Willoughby, New South Wales
- Original team: Hawthorn reserves
- Height: 174 cm (5 ft 9 in)

Playing career^{1}
Years	Club	Games (Goals)
1928–29	Fitzroy	16 (0)
- ^{1} Playing statistics correct to the end of 1929.

Eddie Schenk (12 March 1903 – 7 July 1974) was an Australian rules footballer who played with Fitzroy in the Victorian Football League (VFL).

Schenk later served in the Royal Australian Air Force during World War II.
