= Stan Vandersluys =

Australian rules footballer

Personal information
- Full name: Stan Vandersluys
- Born: 11 July 1924
- Died: 27 February 2005 (aged 80)
- Original team: RAAF
- Height: 183 cm (6 ft 0 in)
- Weight: 84 kg (185 lb)
- Position: Back pocket / Halfback

Playing career^{1}
Years	Club	Games (Goals)
1946–52	Fitzroy	47 (26)
1953	Richmond	3 (0)
Total		50 (26)
- ^{1} Playing statistics correct to the end of 1953.

Stan Vandersluys (11 July 1924 – 27 February 2005) was a former Australian rules footballer who played with Fitzroy and Richmond in the Victorian Football League (VFL).
