= Fred Markby =

Australian rules footballer (1892–1952)

Personal information
- Full name: Frederick Ernest Markby
- Born: 29 June 1892; Carlton North, Victoria
- Died: 10 May 1952 (aged 59); Parkville, Victoria
- Height: 178 cm (5 ft 10 in)

Playing career^{1}
Years	Club	Games (Goals)
1911	Fitzroy	2 (0)
- ^{1} Playing statistics correct to the end of 1911.

Frederick Ernest Markby (29 June 1892 – 10 May 1952) was an Australian rules footballer who played with Fitzroy in the Victorian Football League (VFL).
