= Rod Vernon =

Australian rules footballer

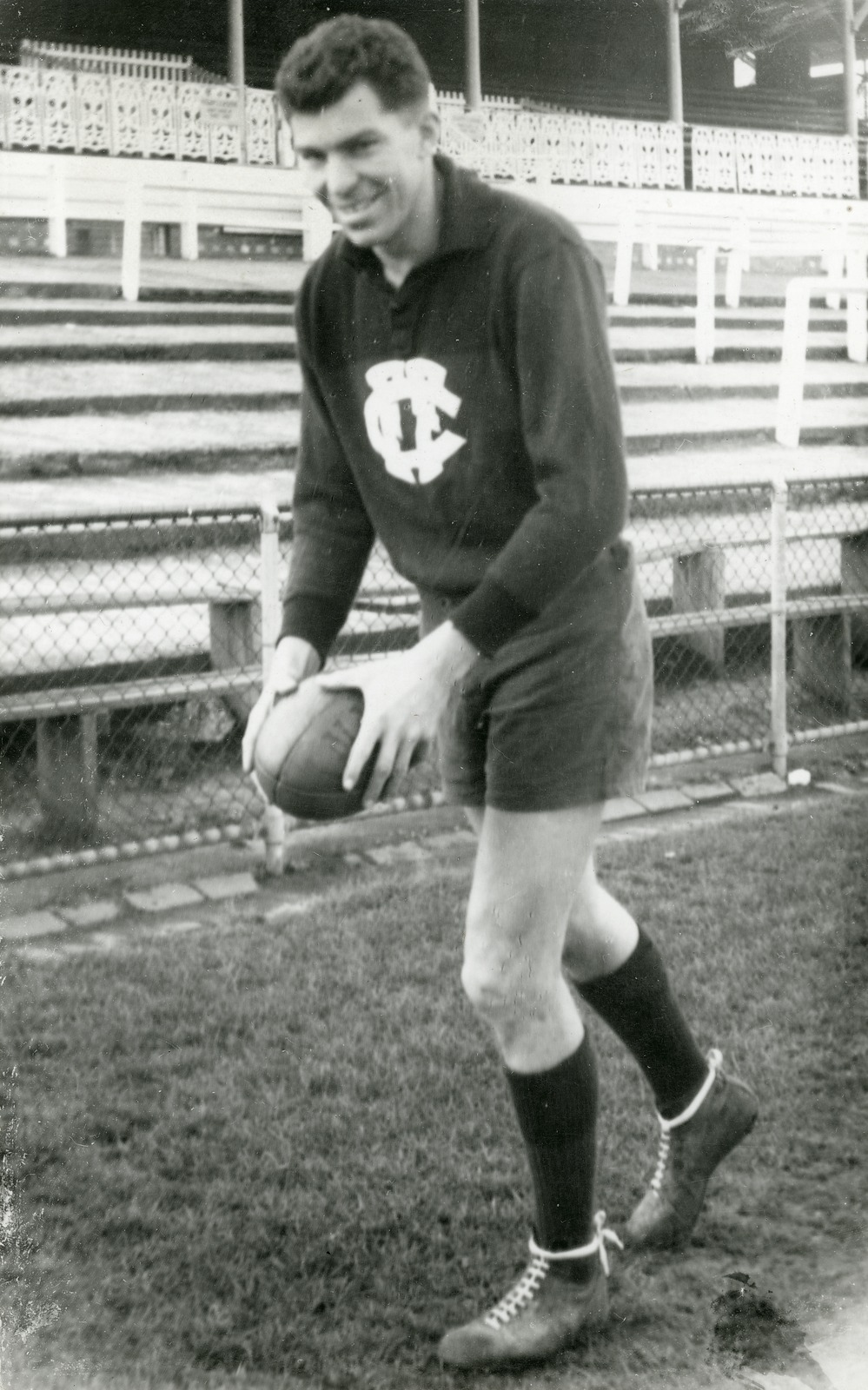

Personal information
- Full name: Rod Vernon
- Born: 3 April 1934
- Died: 8 July 2016 (aged 82)
- Original team: East Brunswick YCW
- Height: 191 cm (6 ft 3 in)
- Weight: 92 kg (203 lb)
- Position: Ruck / Utility

Playing career^{1}
Years	Club	Games (Goals)
1954–63	Fitzroy	119 (72)
- ^{1} Playing statistics correct to the end of 1963.

Rod Vernon (3 April 1934 – 8 July 2016) was an Australian rules footballer who played with Fitzroy in the Victorian Football League (VFL).
