= Rod Lewis (footballer) =

Australian rules footballer

Personal information
- Full name: Rod Lewis
- Born: 16 June 1960 (age 66)
- Original team: University Blacks
- Height: 194 cm (6 ft 4 in)
- Weight: 93 kg (205 lb)

Playing career^{1}
| Years | Club | Games (Goals) |
| 1980–1981,1983 | Fitzroy | 32 (21) |
| 1985 | North Melbourne | 1 (1) |
| Total | | 33 (22) |
- ^{1} Playing statistics correct to the end of 1985.

Rod Lewis (born 16 June 1960) is a former Australian rules footballer who represented the Fitzroy Football Club and the North Melbourne Football Club in the Victorian Football League (VFL) during the 1980s.

Lewis played for Fitzroy from 1980 to 1981, and returned to the side in 1983. Lewis attempted to play for Richmond in the 1984 season, but Fitzroy gained an injunction from the supreme court on the grounds that he was still tied to Fitzroy. Lewis was recruited by North Melbourne for the 1985 season, but played only one game before leaving VFL football at the end of the season.
