= Roy Milne (Australian footballer) =

Australian rules footballer, born 1909

Personal information
- Full name: Roy Clement Milne
- Born: 14 November 1909; Carlton, Victoria
- Died: 14 July 1977 (aged 67); Dandenong, Victoria

Playing career^{1}
Years	Club	Games (Goals)
1927–28	Fitzroy	21 (3)
1929–32	Northcote (VFA)	40 (40)
- ^{1} Playing statistics correct to the end of 1928.

Roy Clement Milne (14 November 1909 – 14 July 1977) was an Australian rules footballer who played with Fitzroy in the Victorian Football League (VFL).

Milne later served in the Australian Army during World War II.
