= Gerry Noonan =

Australian rules footballer (1951–2017)

Personal information
- Full name: Gerard William Noonan
- Born: 24 November 1951
- Died: 26 June 2017 (aged 65)
- Original team: Koroit
- Height: 183 cm (6 ft 0 in)
- Weight: 86 kg (190 lb)

Playing career^{1}
Years	Club	Games (Goals)
1972–1974	Fitzroy	15 (17)
- ^{1} Playing statistics correct to the end of 1974.

Gerard William Noonan (24 November 1951 – 26 June 2017) was an Australian rules footballer who played for the Fitzroy Football Club in the Victorian Football League (VFL).
