= Fred Lethbridge =

Australian rules footballer

Personal information
- Full name: Frederick Lethbridge
- Born: 31 January 1884; Collingwood, Victoria
- Died: 5 August 1961 (aged 77); Carnegie, Victoria
- Height: 179 cm (5 ft 10 in)

Playing career^{1}
Years	Club	Games (Goals)
1904	Fitzroy	3 (1)
- ^{1} Playing statistics correct to the end of 1904.

Fred Lethbridge (31 January 1884 – 5 August 1961) was an Australian rules footballer who played with Fitzroy in the Victorian Football League (VFL).
