= Arthur Fitt =

Australian rules footballer

Personal information
- Full name: Arthur Fitt
- Born: 12 February 1928 (age 98)
- Original team: Preston / Fairfield YCW
- Height: 170 cm (5 ft 7 in)
- Weight: 75 kg (165 lb)

Playing career^{1}
Years	Club	Games (Goals)
1950	Fitzroy	2 (0)
- ^{1} Playing statistics correct to the end of 1950.

Arthur Fitt (born 12 February 1928) is a former Australian rules footballer who played for the Fitzroy Football Club in the Victorian Football League (VFL).
