= Monty Horan =

Australian rules footballer

Personal information
- Full name: Monty Horan
- Born: 19 March 1922
- Died: 3 August 2005 (aged 83)
- Original team: Coburg Juniors
- Height: 174 cm (5 ft 9 in)
- Weight: 68 kg (150 lb)

Playing career^{1}
Years	Club	Games (Goals)
1943–46	Fitzroy	21 (1)
- ^{1} Playing statistics correct to the end of 1946.

Monty Horan (19 March 1922 – 3 August 2005) was a former Australian rules footballer who played with Fitzroy in the Victorian Football League (VFL).
