= Ron Wright (footballer) =

Australian rules footballer

Personal information
- Full name: Ron Wright
- Born: 25 July 1929
- Died: 20 November 2001 (aged 72)
- Height: 170 cm (5 ft 7 in)
- Weight: 67 kg (148 lb)

Playing career^{1}
Years	Club	Games (Goals)
1949	Fitzroy	3 (0)
- ^{1} Playing statistics correct to the end of 1949.

Ron Wright (25 July 1929 – 20 November 2001) was an Australian rules footballer who played with Fitzroy in the Victorian Football League (VFL).
