= Ross Parker (footballer) =

Australian rules footballer

Personal information
- Full name: Ross Parker
- Born: 27 January 1949 (age 77)
- Height: 175 cm (5 ft 9 in)
- Weight: 68 kg (150 lb)

Playing career^{1}
| Years | Club | Games (Goals) |
| 1968 | Fitzroy | 3 (2) |
- ^{1} Playing statistics correct to the end of 1968.

Ross Parker (born 27 January 1949) is a former Australian rules footballer who played with Fitzroy in the Victorian Football League (VFL).
