= Frank Ballantyne =

Australian rules footballer

Personal information
- Full name: Frank Huon Chesterman Ballantyne
- Born: 30 September 1891; Yendon, Victoria
- Died: 11 September 1940 (aged 48); Epworth Hospital, Richmond, Victoria
- Original team: Northcote City
- Height: 174 cm (5 ft 9 in)

Playing career^{1}
Years	Club	Games (Goals)
1916	Fitzroy	4 (1)
- ^{1} Playing statistics correct to the end of 1916.

Frank Huon Chesterman Ballantyne (30 September 1891 – 11 September 1940) was an Australian rules footballer who played with Fitzroy in the Victorian Football League (VFL).

After making four appearances with Fitzroy in 1916 (all losses), Ballantyne enlisted to serve in World War I, serving overseas for two years before returning to Australia in 1918.
