= Tom Reardon =

Australian rules footballer

Personal information
- Full name: Thomas De Brot Reardon
- Born: 13 July 1887; Broomfield, Victoria
- Died: 13 March 1943 (aged 55); Melbourne, Victoria
- Original team: Golden Point (BFL)
- Height: 168 cm (5 ft 6 in)

Playing career^{1}
| Years | Club | Games (Goals) |
| 1911 | Fitzroy | 16 (4) |
- ^{1} Playing statistics correct to the end of 1911.

Thomas De Brot Reardon (13 July 1887 – 13 March 1943) was an Australian rules footballer who played with Fitzroy in the Victorian Football League (VFL).

== Family ==
The son of Thomas Reardon (1857–1940), and Isabella (1856–1922), née Couttie, Thomas Reardon was born in Broomfield (near Ballarat) on 13 July 1887. His birth was registered under the name Thomas Henry Reardon but all adult records record his name as Thomas De Brot Reardon.

He married Alice Eva Elizabeth Charlesworth in Sydney on 10 December 1913. They had five children together, returning to live in Footscray, Victoria shortly after getting married.

== Football ==
=== Golden Point (BFL) ===
Reardon was a leading player for Golden Point in the Ballarat Football League from 1908 to 1910.

=== Fitzroy (VFL) ===
He played 16 games for Fitzroy in 1911, making his debut in Round 3 and playing every game for the rest of the season. He was cleared from Fitzroy back to Golden Point at the start of the 1912 season.
