= Frank Strawbridge =

Australian rules footballer

Personal information
- Full name: William Frank Strawbridge
- Born: 24 January 1896; Northcote, Victoria
- Died: 25 January 1971 (aged 75); Brisbane, Queensland
- Height: 170 cm (5 ft 7 in)

Playing career^{1}
Years	Club	Games (Goals)
1917–19	Fitzroy	32 (10)
- ^{1} Playing statistics correct to the end of 1919.

William Frank Strawbridge (24 January 1896 – 25 January 1971) was an Australian rules footballer who played with Fitzroy in the Victorian Football League (VFL).

In 1920 Strawbridge moved to Prahran in the Victorian Football Association and he later played in Minyip and Echuca.

He was appointed coach of Longford in 1929, but resigned part way through the season due to business commitments.
