= Jim Neylan =

Australian rules footballer

Personal information
- Full name: James Joseph Neylan
- Born: 30 April 1885; Collingwood, Victoria
- Died: 5 July 1969 (aged 84); Sandringham, Victoria
- Original team: West Melbourne (VFA)

Playing career^{1}
Years	Club	Games (Goals)
1905	West Melbourne (VFA)	9 (4)
1906	Fitzroy	1 (0)
1906–07	West Melbourne (VFA)	12 (2)
1908–09	Footscray (VFA)	19 (5)
1909–10	Carlton	3 (0)
1910–11	Brighton (VFA)	21 (3)
- ^{1} Playing statistics correct to the end of 1910.

James Joseph Neylan (30 April 1885 – 5 July 1969) was an Australian rules footballer who played with Fitzroy and Carlton in the Victorian Football League (VFL).

== Death ==
He died on 5 July 1969.
