= Johnny Downs (footballer) =

Australian rules footballer

Personal information
- Full name: John Downs
- Born: 2 March 1890; Collingwood, Victoria
- Died: 4 May 1975 (aged 85); Cobden, Victoria
- Original team: Fitzroy District
- Height: 165 cm (5 ft 5 in)
- Weight: 63.5 kg (140 lb)

Playing career^{1}
Years	Club	Games (Goals)
1913	Fitzroy	2 (0)
1920	Carlton	1 (0)
Total		3 (0)
- ^{1} Playing statistics correct to the end of 1920.

John Downs (2 March 1890 – 4 May 1975) was an Australian rules footballer who played with Fitzroy and Carlton in the Victorian Football League (VFL).
