= Bernie McVeigh =

Australian rules footballer, born 1918

Personal information
- Full name: Bernard McVeigh
- Born: 15 May 1918; Ballarat East, Victoria
- Died: 23 February 1966 (aged 47); Fitzroy, Victoria
- Original team: Yarraville
- Height: 187 cm (6 ft 2 in)
- Weight: 90 kg (198 lb)

Playing career^{1}
Years	Club	Games (Goals)
1938–41	Yarraville (VFA)	47 (50)
1942	Fitzroy	6 (2)
- ^{1} Playing statistics correct to the end of 1942.

Bernard McVeigh (15 May 1918 – 23 February 1966) was an Australian rules footballer who played for the Fitzroy Football Club in the Victorian Football League (VFL).

McVeigh also served in the Australian Army during World War II.
