= Barrie Pigot =

Australian rules footballer

Personal information
- Full name: Barrie Pigot
- Born: 3 August 1938
- Died: 21 June 2008 (aged 69)
- Original team: Swan Hill
- Height: 184 cm (6 ft 0 in)
- Weight: 84 kg (185 lb)

Playing career^{1}
Years	Club	Games (Goals)
1959–1962	Fitzroy	23 (3)
- ^{1} Playing statistics correct to the end of 1962.

Barrie Pigot (3 August 1938 – 21 June 2008) was an Australian rules footballer who played for the Fitzroy Football Club in the Victorian Football League (VFL).
