= Lyle Skinner =

Australian rules footballer

Personal information
- Full name: Lyle Alfred Skinner
- Born: 14 January 1949 (age 77)
- Height: 184 cm (6 ft 0 in)
- Weight: 83 kg (183 lb)

Playing career^{1}
Years	Club	Games (Goals)
1966–1979	Central District	
1971	Fitzroy	2 (1)
- ^{1} Playing statistics correct to the end of 1971.

Lyle Alfred Skinner (born 14 January 1949) is a former Australian rules footballer who played with Central District in the South Australian National Football League (SANFL) and Fitzroy in the Victorian Football League (VFL).

A centreman, Skinner spent some of 1971 in Victoria on national service and made two appearances for Fitzroy. He played in a win over North Melbourne and the following week kicked his only VFL goal against Collingwood.

Apart from his brief stint at Fitzroy, Skinner was a Central District player for his entire career and captained the club in the 1976 and 1977 SANFL seasons.

Skinner coached Hills Football League club Lobethal in 2005.
