= Glenn Ward =

Australian rules footballer

Personal information
- Full name: Glenn Ward
- Born: 22 October 1957 (age 69)
- Original team: Cobden
- Height: 183 cm (6 ft 0 in)
- Weight: 84 kg (185 lb)

Playing career^{1}
Years	Club	Games (Goals)
1977	Fitzroy	3 (0)
- ^{1} Playing statistics correct to the end of 1977.

Glenn Ward is a former Australian rules footballer, who played for the Fitzroy Football Club in the Victorian Football League (VFL).
