= Lee Murnane =

Australian rules footballer

Personal information
- Full name: Lee Murnane
- Born: 8 May 1959 (age 67)
- Original team: Colac-Coragulac
- Height: 180 cm (5 ft 11 in)
- Weight: 80 kg (176 lb)

Playing career^{1}
Years	Club	Games (Goals)
1981–84	Fitzroy	51 (49)
- ^{1} Playing statistics correct to the end of 1984.

Lee Murnane (born 8 May 1959) is a former Australian rules footballer who played with Fitzroy in the Victorian Football League (VFL).
