= Bill McGilvray (footballer) =

Australian rules footballer

Personal information
- Full name: William McGilvray
- Born: 13 March 1895; Geraldton, Western Australia
- Died: 8 May 1984 (aged 89); Rockingham, Western Australia
- Height: 180 cm (5 ft 11 in)
- Weight: 83 kg (183 lb)

Playing career^{1}
Years	Club	Games (Goals)
1920–21	Fitzroy	26 (13)
- ^{1} Playing statistics correct to the end of 1921.

William McGilvray MM (13 March 1895 – 8 May 1984) was an Australian rules footballer who played with Fitzroy in the Victorian Football League (VFL).

Originally recruited from South Fremantle in Western Australia, McGilvray returned there in 1922, captaining the side.
