= Bill Moxon =

Australian rules footballer

Personal information
- Full name: William Thomas Moxon
- Born: 2 February 1885; Williamstown, Victoria
- Died: 23 June 1952 (aged 67); Parkville, Victoria
- Height: 174 cm (5 ft 9 in)

Playing career^{1}
| Years | Club | Games (Goals) |
| 1911 | Fitzroy | 3 (0) |
- ^{1} Playing statistics correct to the end of 1911.

William Thomas Moxon (2 February 1885 – 23 June 1952) was an Australian rules footballer who played with Fitzroy in the Victorian Football League (VFL).
