= Les Sharp =

Australian rules footballer

Personal information
- Full name: Ernest Leslie Sharp
- Born: 30 September 1885; Fitzroy, Victoria
- Died: 5 March 1946 (aged 60); Richmond, Victoria
- Height: 178 cm (5 ft 10 in)

Playing career^{1}
Years	Club	Games (Goals)
1904–05, 1907–08	Fitzroy	23 (12)
- ^{1} Playing statistics correct to the end of 1908.

Ernest Leslie Sharp (30 September 1885 – 5 March 1946) was an Australian rules footballer who played with Fitzroy in the Victorian Football League (VFL).
