= Reg Renwick =

Australian rules footballer

Personal information
- Full name: Reg Renwick
- Born: 17 February 1932
- Original team: Caulfield District
- Height: 187 cm (6 ft 2 in)
- Weight: 80 kg (176 lb)

Playing career^{1}
Years	Club	Games (Goals)
1953	Fitzroy	3 (0)
- ^{1} Playing statistics correct to the end of 1953.

Reg Renwick (born 17 February 1932) is a former Australian rules footballer who played with Fitzroy in the Victorian Football League (VFL).
