= Len Hooke =

Australian rules footballer, born 1909

Personal information
- Full name: Leonard Hooke
- Born: 8 May 1909
- Died: 10 July 1950 (aged 41)

Playing career^{1}
Years	Club	Games (Goals)
1929–30	Fitzroy	7 (16)
1931	North Melbourne	9 (13)
Total		16 (29)
- ^{1} Playing statistics correct to the end of 1931.

Len Hooke (8 May 1909 – 10 July 1950) was an Australian rules footballer who played with Fitzroy and North Melbourne in the Victorian Football League (VFL).
