= Llew Martin =

Australian rules footballer (1920–2001)

Personal information
- Full name: Llewellyn John Martin
- Born: 25 April 1920; Northcote, Victoria
- Died: 13 November 2001 (aged 81)
- Original team: Clifton Hill CYMS (CYMSFA)
- Height: 185 cm (6 ft 1 in)
- Weight: 79 kg (174 lb)

Playing career^{1}
| Years | Club | Games (Goals) |
| 1939 | Fitzroy | 2 (0) |
- ^{1} Playing statistics correct to the end of 1939.

Llewellyn John Martin (25 April 1920 – 13 November 2001) was an Australian rules footballer who played with Fitzroy in the Victorian Football League (VFL).

Martin's senior career consisted of two games late in the 1939 VFL season, in both games being the 19th man who replaced an injured team mate in the last quarter.

Two years later Martin joined the 2nd AIF to serve in World War II after several years serving in the Army Reserve. In September 1941, he was posted to Singapore and was commissioned as an officer a month later. He was captured in the Fall of Singapore in February 1942 and was interned in Changi POW Camp. He was recovered from the Japanese in September 1945 and returned to Australia later that year.
