= Colin McRae (footballer) =

Australian rules footballer

Personal information
- Full name: Colin McRae
- Born: 20 April 1945
- Original team: Dalyston
- Height: 191 cm (6 ft 3 in)
- Weight: 87 kg (192 lb)

Playing career^{1}
Years	Club	Games (Goals)
1964–65	Fitzroy	18 (8)
- ^{1} Playing statistics correct to the end of 1965.

Colin McRae (born 20 April 1945) is a former Australian rules footballer who played with Fitzroy in the Victorian Football League (VFL).
