= Duane Rowe =

Australian rules footballer

Personal information
- Full name: Duane Rowe
- Born: 1 April 1966 (age 60)
- Original team: Bulleen-Templestowe
- Height: 183 cm (6 ft 0 in)
- Weight: 80 kg (176 lb)

Playing career^{1}
Years	Club	Games (Goals)
1986; 1989–1982	Fitzroy	31 (3)
- ^{1} Playing statistics correct to the end of 1992.

Duane Rowe is a former Australian rules footballer, who played for the Fitzroy Football Club in the Victorian Football League (VFL).

== Career ==
Rowe played for Fitzroy in the 1986 season, before leaving, and then returning in 1989. He then left again in 1992, and never returned to the VFL.
