= Leon Goonan =

Australian rules footballer

Personal information
- Full name: Leon Goonan
- Born: 30 August 1955 (age 71)
- Original team: Coragulac
- Height: 180 cm (5 ft 11 in)
- Weight: 70 kg (154 lb)

Playing career^{1}
| Years | Club | Games (Goals) |
| 1976 | Fitzroy | 2 (1) |
- ^{1} Playing statistics correct to the end of 1976.

Leon Goonan is a former Australian rules footballer, who played for the Fitzroy Football Club in the Victorian Football League (VFL).
