= Alf Appleton =

Australian rules footballer

Personal information
- Full name: Alfred Edward Appleton
- Born: 18 April 1882; Macarthur, Victoria
- Died: 27 June 1973 (aged 91); Geelong, Victoria
- Original team: Ballarat, Victoria
- Height: 173 cm (5 ft 8 in)

Playing career^{1}
| Years | Club | Games (Goals) |
| 1907 | Fitzroy | 5 (2) |
- ^{1} Playing statistics correct to the end of 1907.

Alfred Edward Appleton (18 April 1882 – 27 June 1973) was an Australian rules footballer who played for the Fitzroy Football Club in the Victorian Football League (VFL).
