= Bill Payne (footballer, born 1883) =

Australian rules footballer

Personal information
- Full name: William Payne
- Born: 8 August 1883; Heidelberg, Victoria
- Died: 24 October 1940 (aged 57); Fitzroy, Victoria
- Height: 175 cm (5 ft 9 in)

Playing career^{1}
Years	Club	Games (Goals)
1909–10	Fitzroy	17 (0)
- ^{1} Playing statistics correct to the end of 1910.

William Payne (8 August 1883 – 24 October 1940) was an Australian rules footballer who played with Fitzroy in the Victorian Football League (VFL).
