= Mick Gilmore =

Australian rules footballer

Personal information
- Full name: Mick Gilmore
- Born: 8 August 1961 (age 65)
- Original team: Bulleen-Templestowe
- Height: 180 cm (5 ft 11 in)
- Weight: 80 kg (176 lb)

Playing career^{1}
Years	Club	Games (Goals)
1980	Fitzroy	2 (1)
- ^{1} Playing statistics correct to the end of 1980.

Mick Gilmore is a former Australian rules footballer, who played for the Fitzroy Football Club in the Victorian Football League (VFL).

== Career ==
Gilmore played two games for Fitzroy in the 1980 season, scoring one goal.
