= Gordon Brunnen =

Australian rules footballer

Personal information
- Full name: Gordon James Brunnen
- Born: 11 May 1922; North Melbourne, Victoria
- Died: 20 March 2008 (aged 85)
- Original team: Navy
- Height: 188 cm (6 ft 2 in)
- Weight: 83 kg (183 lb)

Playing career^{1}
Years	Club	Games (Goals)
1946–47	St Kilda	26 (0)
1948	Fitzroy	3 (0)
Total		29 (0)
- ^{1} Playing statistics correct to the end of 1948.

Gordon James Brunnen (11 May 1922 – 20 March 2008) was an Australian rules footballer who played with St Kilda and Fitzroy in the Victorian Football League (VFL).

Prior to playing VFL football, Brunnen served in the Royal Australian Navy during World War II.
