= Les Russell =

Australian rules footballer

Personal information
- Full name: Les Russell
- Born: 2 April 1940
- Died: 1 January 2023 (aged 82)
- Original team: Swan Hill
- Height: 180 cm (5 ft 11 in)
- Weight: 80 kg (176 lb)

Playing career^{1}
Years	Club	Games (Goals)
1959, 1961	Fitzroy	7 (0)
- ^{1} Playing statistics correct to the end of 1961.

Les Russell (2 April 1940 – 1 January 2023) was an Australian rules footballer who played with Fitzroy in the Victorian Football League (VFL).
