= Joe McKinley =

Australian rules footballer (1911–1961)

Personal information
- Full name: Joseph Francis McKinley
- Born: 7 August 1911; Timor West, Victoria
- Died: 15 October 1961 (aged 50); Kew, Victoria
- Height: 182 cm (6 ft 0 in)
- Weight: 83 kg (183 lb)

Playing career^{1}
Years	Club	Games (Goals)
1929	Prahran (VFA)	4 (1)
1932	Fitzroy	1 (0)
- ^{1} Playing statistics correct to the end of 1932.

Joseph Francis McKinley (7 August 1911 – 15 October 1961) was an Australian rules footballer who played with Fitzroy in the Victorian Football League (VFL).

== Family ==
The son of Edward Thomas McKinley (1857–1931), and Margaret Agnes McKinley (1867–1952), née Hickey, Joseph Francis McKinley was born at Timor West on 7 August 1911.

He married Margaret Mary Cattanach (1918–1997) in 1945.

== Death ==
He died at Kew, Victoria on 15 October 1961.
