= Keith Giffen (footballer) =

Australian rules footballer, born 1911

Personal information
- Full name: Keith Giffen
- Born: 16 September 1911
- Died: 4 May 1983 (aged 71)

Playing career^{1}
Years	Club	Games (Goals)
1933	Fitzroy	2 (0)
- ^{1} Playing statistics correct to the end of 1933.

Keith Giffen (16 September 1911 – 4 May 1983) was an Australian rules footballer who played with Fitzroy in the Victorian Football League (VFL).
