= Roger Lamley =

Australian rules footballer

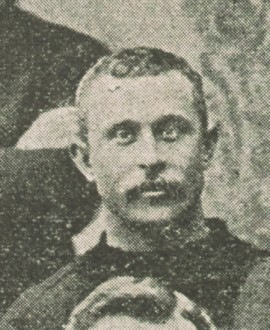

Personal information
- Full name: Charles Horace Lamley
- Born: 9 March 1870; Richmond, Victoria
- Died: 22 December 1961 (aged 91); Collingwood, Victoria
- Original team: North Melbourne (VFA)

Playing career^{1}
Years	Club	Games (Goals)
1897–1898	Fitzroy	10 (6)
- ^{1} Playing statistics correct to the end of 1898.

"Roger" Charles Horace Lamley (9 March 1870 – 22 December 1961) was an Australian rules footballer who played with Fitzroy in the Victorian Football League (VFL). He played for North Melbourne and Collingwood in the Victorian Football Association before coming to Fitzroy.
