= Syd Smith (Australian footballer) =

Australian rules footballer

Personal information
- Full name: Sydney Leslie Smith
- Born: 21 November 1888; Fitzroy, Victoria
- Died: 20 June 1954 (aged 65); Heidelberg, Victoria
- Original team: Manjimup

Playing career^{1}
| Years | Club | Games (Goals) |
| 1919 | Fitzroy | 1 (3) |
| 1919–20 | Northcote (VFA) | 12 (10) |
- ^{1} Playing statistics correct to the end of 1920.

Sydney Leslie Smith (21 November 1888 – 20 June 1954) was an Australian rules footballer who played with Fitzroy in the Victorian Football League (VFL).

== Family ==
The son of Charles Castle Smith (1846–1922), and Jane Smith (1848–1934), née Harris, Sydney Leslie Smith was born in Fitzroy on 21 November 1888, the eighth of nine children in the family.

== War service ==
Having moved to Western Australia, Sydney Leslie Smith enlisted in Helena Vale, Western Australia at the outbreak of World War I and served for the duration of the war, seeing active service in France. While serving, he married Ivy Dorothy Hardiman in Ilford, Essex on 16 January 1918.

== Football ==
After one game with Fitzroy where he scored three goals, Smith moved to Northcote where he played another 12 games.
