= Ron Morgan (footballer) =

Australian rules footballer

Personal information
- Full name: Ron Morgan
- Born: 21 December 1931
- Died: 28 March 2013 (aged 81)
- Original team: Morwell
- Height: 188 cm (6 ft 2 in)
- Weight: 89 kg (196 lb)

Playing career^{1}
Years	Club	Games (Goals)
1954	Fitzroy	8 (8)
- ^{1} Playing statistics correct to the end of 1954.

Ron Morgan (21 December 1931 – 28 March 2013) was an Australian rules footballer who played with Fitzroy in the Victorian Football League (VFL).
