= Don Whitford =

Australian rules footballer

Personal information
- Full name: Don Whitford
- Born: 15 November 1956 (age 69)
- Original team: Timboon
- Height: 182 cm (6 ft 0 in)
- Weight: 79 kg (174 lb)

Playing career^{1}
Years	Club	Games (Goals)
1974–78	Fitzroy	42 (8)
1979–81	Melbourne	10 (3)
Total		52 (11)
- ^{1} Playing statistics correct to the end of 1981.

Don Whitford (born 15 November 1956) is a former Australian rules footballer who played with Fitzroy and Melbourne in the Victorian Football League (VFL).
