= Jack McArthur (Australian footballer) =

Australian rules footballer

Personal information
- Full name: John Adrian McArthur
- Born: 5 May 1891; Mornington, Victoria
- Died: 7 July 1962 (aged 71); Melbourne, Victoria
- Original team: Mornington
- Height: 170 cm (5 ft 7 in)
- Weight: 65 kg (143 lb)

Playing career^{1}
Years	Club	Games (Goals)
1912–13	Fitzroy	14 (0)
- ^{1} Playing statistics correct to the end of 1913.

John Adrian McArthur (5 May 1891 – 7 July 1962) was an Australian rules footballer who played with Fitzroy in the Victorian Football League (VFL).
