= Charlie Linney =

Australian rules footballer

Personal information
- Full name: Charlie Linney
- Born: 8 September 1925
- Died: 22 December 2008 (aged 83)
- Original team: Fitzroy District
- Height: 175 cm (5 ft 9 in)
- Weight: 73 kg (161 lb)

Playing career^{1}
Years	Club	Games (Goals)
1944–46	Fitzroy	12 (0)
- ^{1} Playing statistics correct to the end of 1946.

Charlie Linney (8 September 1925 – 22 December 2008) was a former Australian rules footballer who played with Fitzroy in the Victorian Football League (VFL).
