= Paul Hodgson (Australian footballer) =

Australian rules footballer

Personal information
- Full name: Paul Hodgson
- Born: 20 May 1944 (age 82)
- Original team: Diamond Creek
- Height: 198 cm (6 ft 6 in)
- Weight: 104 kg (229 lb)

Playing career^{1}
Years	Club	Games (Goals)
1966	Fitzroy	3 (0)
- ^{1} Playing statistics correct to the end of 1966.

Paul Hodgson (born 20 May 1944) is a former Australian rules footballer who played with Fitzroy in the Victorian Football League (VFL).
