= Bill Laver =

Australian rules footballer

Personal information
- Full name: William Alfred Laver
- Born: 21 August 1888; Castlemaine, Victoria
- Died: 16 November 1922 (aged 34); Cheltenham, Victoria
- Original team: North Melbourne (VFA)

Playing career^{1}
Years	Club	Games (Goals)
1908	Carlton	1 (0)
1912	Fitzroy	7 (1)
Total		8 (1)
- ^{1} Playing statistics correct to the end of 1912.

William Alfred Laver (21 August 1888 – 16 November 1922) was an Australian rules footballer who played with Carlton and Fitzroy in the Victorian Football League (VFL).
