= Dave McGrath (footballer, born 1872) =

Australian rules footballer

Personal information
- Full name: David Charles McGrath
- Born: 10 November 1872; Newtown, Victoria (Golden Plains Shire)
- Died: 31 July 1934 (aged 61); Ballarat, Victoria
- Height: 170 cm (5 ft 7 in)
- Weight: 78 kg (172 lb)

Playing career^{1}
| Years | Club | Games (Goals) |
| 1900 | Fitzroy | 1 (1) |
- ^{1} Playing statistics correct to the end of 1900.

David Charles McGrath (10 November 1872 – 31 July 1934) Australian rules footballer who played with Fitzroy in the Victorian Football League (VFL).
