= Maurie Barrett =

Australian rules footballer

Personal information
- Full name: Maurice Patrick Barrett
- Born: 4 June 1893; Richmond, Victoria
- Died: 9 November 1981 (aged 88); Heidelberg, Victoria

Playing career^{1}
Years	Club	Games (Goals)
1916	Fitzroy	2 (1)
- ^{1} Playing statistics correct to the end of 1916.

Maurice Patrick Barrett (4 June 1893 – 9 November 1981) was an Australian rules footballer who played with Fitzroy in the Victorian Football League (VFL).
