= Ray Davies (footballer, born 1932) =

Australian rules footballer

Personal information
- Full name: Ray Davies
- Born: 26 September 1932
- Died: 21 February 1984 (aged 51)
- Original team: Preston
- Height: 175 cm (5 ft 9 in)
- Weight: 83 kg (183 lb)

Playing career^{1}
Years	Club	Games (Goals)
1954	Fitzroy	1 (0)
- ^{1} Playing statistics correct to the end of 1954.

Ray Davies (26 September 1932 – 21 February 1984) was a former Australian rules footballer who played with Fitzroy in the Victorian Football League (VFL).
