= Lawrie Bennett =

Australian rules footballer

Personal information
- Full name: Lawrence Hugh Bennett
- Born: 29 January 1949 (age 77)
- Original team: East Perth
- Height: 178 cm (5 ft 10 in)
- Weight: 89 kg (196 lb)

Playing career^{1}
Years	Club	Games (Goals)
1970	Fitzroy	1 (0)
- ^{1} Playing statistics correct to the end of 1970.

Lawrence Hugh Bennett (born 29 January 1949) is a former Australian rules footballer who played with Fitzroy in the Victorian Football League (VFL) and East Perth in the West Australian Football League.
