= Roy Hearn =

Australian rules footballer, born 1908

Personal information
- Full name: Roy William Hearn
- Born: 22 February 1908; Preston, Victoria
- Died: 18 August 1978 (aged 70); Footscray, Victoria
- Height: 180 cm (5 ft 11 in)
- Weight: 76 kg (168 lb)

Playing career^{1}
Years	Club	Games (Goals)
1930–31	Brunswick (VFA)	21 (8)
1934	Fitzroy	8 (9)
1932	Brunswick (VFA)	4 (0)
1933–34	Preston (VFA)	23 (32)
- ^{1} Playing statistics correct to the end of 1931.

Roy William Hearn (22 February 1908 – 18 August 1978) was an Australian rules footballer who played with Fitzroy in the Victorian Football League (VFL).
