= Robbie Gall =

Australian rules footballer, born 1906

Personal information
- Full name: Robert Gall
- Born: 17 July 1906
- Died: 19 December 1971 (aged 65)
- Original team: Northcote
- Height: 171 cm (5 ft 7 in)

Playing career^{1}
Years	Club	Games (Goals)
1928–29	Fitzroy	4 (2)
- ^{1} Playing statistics correct to the end of 1929.

Robbie Gall (17 July 1906 – 19 December 1971) was an Australian rules footballer who played with Fitzroy in the Victorian Football League (VFL).
