= Roland Lynch (footballer) =

Australian rules footballer

Personal information
- Full name: Roland Lynch
- Born: 20 March 1893; Murrumbeena, Victoria
- Died: 21 February 1971 (aged 77); Heidelberg, Victoria
- Original team: Woodend
- Height: 191 cm (6 ft 3 in)
- Weight: 89 kg (196 lb)

Playing career^{1}
Years	Club	Games (Goals)
1913	Fitzroy	1 (0)
- ^{1} Playing statistics correct to the end of 1913.

Roland Lynch (20 March 1893 – 21 February 1971) was an Australian rules footballer who played with Fitzroy in the Victorian Football League (VFL).
