= Arthur Cockram =

Australian rules footballer, born 1908

Personal information
- Full name: Arthur Cockram
- Born: 8 April 1908
- Died: 19 October 1968 (aged 60)
- Original team: Alphington

Playing career^{1}
Years	Club	Games (Goals)
1929	Fitzroy	1 (0)
- ^{1} Playing statistics correct to the end of 1929.

Arthur Cockram (8 April 1908 – 19 October 1968) was an Australian rules footballer who played for the Fitzroy Football Club in the Victorian Football League (VFL).
