= Alan Quaife =

Australian rules footballer (1945–2019)

Personal information
- Full name: Alan Jeffrey Quaife
- Born: 3 May 1945
- Died: 27 August 2019 (aged 74)
- Height: 177 cm (5 ft 10 in)
- Weight: 73 kg (161 lb)

Playing career^{1}
Years	Club	Games (Goals)
1964	Fitzroy	3 (0)
- ^{1} Playing statistics correct to the end of 1964.

Alan Jeffrey Quaife (3 May 1945 – 27 August 2019) was an Australian rules footballer who played for the Fitzroy Football Club in the Victorian Football League (VFL).
