= Robert Ireland (Australian footballer) =

Australian rules footballer

Personal information
- Full name: Robert Ireland
- Born: 16 November 1948 (age 77)
- Original team: Newborough
- Height: 180 cm (5 ft 11 in)
- Weight: 85 kg (187 lb)

Playing career^{1}
| Years | Club | Games (Goals) |
| 1969–70 | Fitzroy | 5 (0) |
- ^{1} Playing statistics correct to the end of 1970.

Robert Ireland (born 16 November 1948) is a former Australian rules footballer who played with Fitzroy in the Victorian Football League (VFL).
