= Bill O'Kane =

Australian rules footballer

Personal information
- Full name: William O'Kane
- Born: 1 July 1940
- Died: 28 May 2014 (aged 73)
- Original team: Myrtleford
- Height: 191 cm (6 ft 3 in)
- Weight: 89 kg (196 lb)

Playing career^{1}
Years	Club	Games (Goals)
1962	Fitzroy	2 (0)
- ^{1} Playing statistics correct to the end of 1962.

William O'Kane (1 July 1940 – 28 May 2014) was an Australian rules footballer who played with Fitzroy in the Victorian Football League (VFL).
