= Eric Reichman =

Australian rules footballer, born 1904

Personal information
- Full name: Eric Reichman
- Born: 25 August 1904; Woorndoo, Victoria
- Died: 19 June 1984 (aged 79); Preston, Victoria
- Original team: Brunswick
- Height: 178 cm (5 ft 10 in)
- Weight: 75 kg (165 lb)

Playing career^{1}
Years	Club	Games (Goals)
1925, 1927–28	Fitzroy	18 (0)
1926	Brunswick (VFA)	10 (9)
1929–32	Preston (VFA)	67 (1)
- ^{1} Playing statistics correct to the end of 1928.

Eric Reichman (25 August 1904 – 19 June 1984) was an Australian rules footballer who played with Fitzroy in the Victorian Football League (VFL).
