= Val Duncan =

Australian rules footballer

Personal information
- Full name: Claude Valentine Duncan
- Born: 4 May 1884; Sale, Victoria
- Died: 20 May 1960 (aged 76); Melbourne, Victoria
- Original team: Malvern
- Height: 177 cm (5 ft 10 in)

Playing career^{1}
Years	Club	Games (Goals)
1908	Fitzroy	11 (0)
- ^{1} Playing statistics correct to the end of 1908.

Claude Valentine Duncan (4 May 1884 – 20 May 1960) was an Australian rules footballer who played with Fitzroy in the Victorian Football League (VFL).
