= Malcolm Bramley =

Australian rules footballer

Personal information
- Full name: Malcolm Bramley
- Born: 10 February 1959 (age 67)
- Original team: Reservoir Colts
- Height: 179 cm (5 ft 10 in)
- Weight: 73 kg (161 lb)

Playing career^{1}
Years	Club	Games (Goals)
1979–1980	Fitzroy	5 (2)
- ^{1} Playing statistics correct to the end of 1980.

Malcolm Bramley is a former Australian rules footballer, who played for the Fitzroy Football Club in the Victorian Football League (VFL).
