= Bill Warne =

Australian rules footballer, born 1914

Personal information
- Full name: Elias Albert Warne
- Born: 21 August 1914
- Died: 26 February 1945 (aged 30)
- Original team: Old Scotch Collegians
- Height: 185 cm (6 ft 1 in)
- Weight: 86 kg (190 lb)

Playing career^{1}
Years	Club	Games (Goals)
1936–37	Fitzroy	6 (3)
- ^{1} Playing statistics correct to the end of 1937.

Elias Albert "Bill" Warne (21 August 1914 – 26 February 1945) was an Australian rules footballer who played with Fitzroy in the Victorian Football League (VFL).
