= Darren Murphy (Australian footballer) =

Australian rules footballer

Personal information
- Full name: Darren Murphy
- Born: 6 April 1964 (age 62)
- Height: 193 cm (6 ft 4 in)
- Weight: 86 kg (190 lb)

Playing career^{1}
Years	Club	Games (Goals)
1985	Fitzroy	4 (0)
- ^{1} Playing statistics correct to the end of 1985.

Darren Murphy is a former Australian rules footballer, who played for the Fitzroy Football Club in the Victorian Football League (VFL).

== Career ==
Murphy played four games for Fitzroy in the 1985 season.
