= Norm Andrews =

Australian rules footballer, born 1914

Personal information
- Born: 7 April 1914
- Died: 16 August 1977 (aged 63)
- Original team: Pakenham

Playing career^{1}
Years	Club	Games (Goals)
1936	Fitzroy	4 (1)
- ^{1} Playing statistics correct to the end of 1936.

Norm Andrews (7 April 1914 – 16 August 1977) was an Australian rules footballer who played with Fitzroy in the Victorian Football League (VFL).
