= Ron Latham =

Australian rules footballer, born 1913

Personal information
- Full name: Ronald William Latham
- Born: 31 July 1913; Derby, Tasmania
- Died: 12 August 1975 (aged 62); Croydon, Victoria
- Original team: Fitzroy Juniors
- Height: 173 cm (5 ft 8 in)
- Weight: 67 kg (148 lb)

Playing career^{1}
Years	Club	Games (Goals)
1935	Fitzroy	1 (0)
- ^{1} Playing statistics correct to the end of 1935.

Ronald William Latham (31 July 1913 – 12 August 1975) was an Australian rules footballer who played with Fitzroy in the Victorian Football League (VFL).
