= Colin Dodd =

Australian rules footballer

Personal information
- Full name: Colin Dodd
- Born: 25 May 1930
- Died: 4 August 2009 (aged 79)
- Height: 170 cm (5 ft 7 in)
- Weight: 72 kg (159 lb)

Playing career^{1}
Years	Club	Games (Goals)
1956	Fitzroy	1 (0)
- ^{1} Playing statistics correct to the end of 1956.

Colin Dodd (25 May 1930 – 4 August 2009) was an Australian rules footballer who played with Fitzroy in the Victorian Football League (VFL).
