= Greg Lourey =

Australian rules footballer

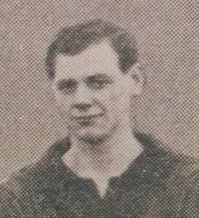

Personal information
- Full name: Greg Lourey
- Born: 1 August 1927
- Died: 30 November 2025 (aged 98)
- Original team: South Yarra YCW
- Height: 188 cm (6 ft 2 in)
- Weight: 84 kg (185 lb)
- Position: Follower

Playing career^{1}
Years	Club	Games (Goals)
1948, 1950	Melbourne	7 (1)
1951–52	Fitzroy	10 (1)
Total		17 (2)
- ^{1} Playing statistics correct to the end of 1952.

Greg Lourey (1 August 1927 – 30 November 2025) was an Australian rules footballer who played with Melbourne and Fitzroy in the Victorian Football League (VFL).
