= Steve Foley (Australian footballer) =

Australian rules footballer, born 1902

Personal information
- Full name: Stephen Andrew Foley
- Born: 31 August 1902
- Died: 22 February 1948 (aged 45)
- Height: 180 cm (5 ft 11 in)

Playing career^{1}
Years	Club	Games (Goals)
1927–28	Fitzroy	15 (0)
- ^{1} Playing statistics correct to the end of 1928.

Steve Foley (31 August 1902 – 22 February 1948) was an Australian rules footballer who played with Fitzroy in the Victorian Football League (VFL).
