= Andrew Kuka =

Australian rules footballer

Personal information
- Full name: Andrew Kuka
- Born: 9 May 1951
- Died: 24 June 2017 (aged 66)
- Original team: Morwell Tigers / Morwell High
- Height: 192 cm (6 ft 4 in)
- Weight: 83 kg (183 lb)

Playing career^{1}
Years	Club	Games (Goals)
1967	Fitzroy	1 (0)
- ^{1} Playing statistics correct to the end of 1967.

Andrew Kuka (9 May 1951 – 24 June 2017) was an Australian rules footballer who played for the Fitzroy Football Club in the Victorian Football League (VFL).
