= Terry MacKin =

Australian rules footballer, born 1915

Terry Mackin

Personal information
- Full name: Terence Bonaventure Mackin
- Born: 1 May 1915; Fish Creek, Victoria
- Died: 18 October 2008 (aged 93)
- Original team: Fish Creek
- Height: 183 cm (6 ft 0 in)
- Weight: 84 kg (185 lb)

Playing career^{1}
Years	Club	Games (Goals)
1936	Fitzroy	13 (4)
- ^{1} Playing statistics correct to the end of 1936.

Terence Bonaventure Mackin (1 May 1915 – 18 October 2008) was an Australian rules footballer who played with Fitzroy in the Victorian Football League (VFL).
