= Lance Watson (Australian footballer) =

Australian rules footballer (1931–2014)

Personal information
- Full name: Lance Alfred Watson
- Born: 4 January 1931
- Died: 17 October 2014 (aged 83)
- Original team: Parkside
- Height: 185 cm (6 ft 1 in)
- Weight: 84 kg (185 lb)

Playing career^{1}
Years	Club	Games (Goals)
1950–52	Fitzroy	23 (1)
- ^{1} Playing statistics correct to the end of 1952.

Lance Watson (4 January 1931 – 17 October 2014) was an Australian rules footballer who played with Fitzroy in the Victorian Football League (VFL).
