= Jim Tulloch =

Australian rules footballer

Personal information
- Full name: James Percival Tulloch
- Born: 27 June 1878; Richmond, Victoria
- Died: 22 March 1944 (aged 65); Oakleigh, Victoria
- Original team: Pembroke

Playing career^{1}
Years	Club	Games (Goals)
1898	Fitzroy	1 (0)
- ^{1} Playing statistics correct to the end of 1898.

James Percival Tulloch (27 June 1878 – 22 March 1944) was an Australian rules footballer who played with Fitzroy in the Victorian Football League (VFL).
