= Greg Booth =

Australian rules footballer

Personal information
- Full name: Gregory Booth
- Born: 28 August 1951 (age 75)
- Original team: Balwyn
- Height: 184 cm (6 ft 0 in)
- Weight: 84 kg (185 lb)

Playing career^{1}
Years	Club	Games (Goals)
1972–1974	Fitzroy	17 (0)
- ^{1} Playing statistics correct to the end of 1974.

Gregory Booth (born 28 August 1951) is a former Australian rules footballer, who played for the Fitzroy Football Club in the Victorian Football League (VFL).
