= Arthur Treloar =

Australian rules footballer

Personal information
- Full name: Arthur Treloar
- Born: 29 September 1884; Ballarat, Victoria
- Died: 5 March 1927 (aged 42); At sea
- Original team: Police
- Height: 177 cm (5 ft 10 in)

Playing career^{1}
Years	Club	Games (Goals)
1907–1908	Fitzroy	4 (3)
- ^{1} Playing statistics correct to the end of 1908.

Arthur Treloar (29 September 1884 – 5 March 1927) was an Australian rules footballer who played for the Fitzroy Football Club in the Victorian Football League (VFL).
