= Alby McDonald =

Australian rules footballer

Personal information
- Full name: Albert Murdoch McDonald
- Born: 27 February 1881; Amphitheatre, Victoria
- Died: 8 June 1961 (aged 80); Thornbury, Victoria
- Original team: Numurkah
- Height: 179 cm (5 ft 10 in)
- Weight: 80 kg (176 lb)

Playing career^{1}
Years	Club	Games (Goals)
1902–03	Fitzroy	7 (1)
- ^{1} Playing statistics correct to the end of 1903.

Albert Murdoch McDonald (27 February 1881 – 8 June 1961) was an Australian rules footballer who played with Fitzroy in the Victorian Football League (VFL).
