= Barry Waters =

Australian rules footballer

Personal information
- Full name: Barry Reginald Waters
- Born: 29 December 1928
- Died: 8 July 2023 (aged 94)
- Original team: University High School
- Height: 178 cm (5 ft 10 in)
- Weight: 76 kg (168 lb)

Playing career^{1}
Years	Club	Games (Goals)
1949	Fitzroy	1 (0)
- ^{1} Playing statistics correct to the end of 1949.

Barry Reginald Waters OAM (29 December 1928 – 8 July 2023) was an Australian rules footballer who played for the Fitzroy Football Club in the Victorian Football League (VFL).
