= Joe Youlden =

Australian rules footballer

Personal information
- Full name: Joseph Edgar Youlden
- Born: 21 November 1883; Bendigo, Victoria
- Died: 17 August 1959 (aged 75); Ballarat, Victoria
- Height: 185 cm (6 ft 1 in)

Playing career^{1}
Years	Club	Games (Goals)
1906	Fitzroy	2 (0)
- ^{1} Playing statistics correct to the end of 1906.

Joseph Edgar Youlden (21 November 1883 – 17 August 1959) was an Australian rules footballer who played with Fitzroy in the Victorian Football League (VFL).
