= Peter Connell (footballer) =

Australian rules footballer, born 1912

Personal information
- Full name: Peter Connell
- Born: 23 November 1912
- Died: 17 September 1964 (aged 51)
- Original team: Northcote
- Height: 183 cm (6 ft 0 in)
- Weight: 81 kg (179 lb)

Playing career^{1}
Years	Club	Games (Goals)
1936	Fitzroy	7 (4)
- ^{1} Playing statistics correct to the end of 1936.

Peter Connell (23 November 1912 – 17 September 1964) was an Australian rules footballer who played with Fitzroy in the Victorian Football League (VFL).
