= Wally Clark (Australian footballer) =

Australian rules footballer

Personal information
- Full name: Charles Wallace Clark
- Born: 25 May 1936
- Died: 24 March 1996 (aged 59); Adelaide
- Original team: Fitzroy U19s
- Height: 168 cm (5 ft 6 in)
- Weight: 74 kg (163 lb)
- Position: Rover

Playing career^{1}
Years	Club	Games (Goals)
1955–1962	Fitzroy	105 (120)

Coaching career
Years	Club	Games (W–L–D)
1963	Fitzroy	1 (1–0–0)
- ^{1} Playing statistics correct to the end of 1962.

Charles Wallace Clark (25 May 1936 – 24 March 1996) was an Australian rules footballer who played for Fitzroy in the Victorian Football League (VFL).

== Fitzroy ==
Clark, who was at Fitzroy from underage level, played as a rover. He was their top goal-kicker with 21 goals in 1962 but had his best goal kicking year when he bagged 33 two years earlier.

Although he retired from the seniors in 1963, Clark continued in the Fitzroy reserves as captain-coach and won a Gardiner Medal for his on field performances.

== Saturday, 6 July 1963 ==
Clark coached the senior Fitzroy side for only one match.

=== Predictions ===
With the team having lost the first nine home-and-away matches in the 1963 season, and with its opponents on the day (the second week-end of the split round 10) being the powerful Geelong side that would go on to win the 1963 VFL premiership, nobody gave the Fitzroy team a chance.

=== The selected team ===
With its captain-coach, Kevin Murray, and its regular first rover, Graham Campbell, absent in South Australia with the Victorian Interstate side—and with Geoff Doubleday, Joe Dixon, and Ted Lovett unavailable (each had returned to their country clubs) -- the selectors made eight changes to the preceding round's team (and in the process, dropped both Stewart Duncan and Brett Pollock, and relegated Ray Slocum to the bench as 20th man) and, as well, appointed the (then) Second XVIII coach, Wally Clark, as the team's stand-in coach (it was the only time that Clark ever coached the First XVIII).

With seven teenagers, and only six of the twenty chosen having played more than 20 First XVIII games, the team was very inexperienced:

The Fitzroy Team (6 July 1963)
B:	Brian Carroll; 22yrs; 2 games	Allen Lynch; 24yrs; 53 games	Norm Brown; 19yrs; 12 games
HB:	Brian Pert; 27yrs; 94 games	David Sykes; 20yrs; 15 games	Bob Beattie; 19yrs; 16 games
C:	Wayne Eastman; 21yrs; 12 games	John Bahen; 19yrs; 18 games	Colin Sleep; 18yrs; 6 games
HF:	Tony Hirst; 18yrs; 1 game	Ron Harvey; 27yrs; 118 games	Brian Beers; 24yrs; 69 games
F:	Max Miers; 22yrs; 17 games	Gary Lazarus; 17yrs; 9 games	Ian McCrae; 19yrs; 10 games
Foll:	Bryan Clements; 20yrs; 11 games	Ron Fry; 26yrs; 4 games	John Hayes; 23yrs; 38 games
Res:	Barry Fitzgerald; 24yrs; debut	Ray Slocum; 25yrs; 83 games	
Coach:	Wally Clark: Debut as First XVIII coach		

=== The match ===
The match, played at the Brunswick Street Oval, with Geelong having already won the Under 19s game, 10.11 (71) to 6.10 (46), and the Second XVIII's match, 8.13 (61) to 4.8 (32) in the curtain raisers, provided "one of the biggest upsets in that decade of VFL football" (Spaull, 2014), when the Fitzroy team thrashed the Geelong side 9.13 (67) to 3.13 (31), not only leading Geelong 3.7 (25) to 1.6 (12) at half time, but, also following Clark's inspiring half-time address delivered to the players in room packed with Fitzroy supporters (whom regular coach Kevin Murray routinely excluded from the change-rooms), scoring 5.4 (34) to Geelong's 1.3 (9) in the third quarter.

=== Remainder of the 1963 season ===
This extraordinary performance strongly contrasts with the fact that Fitzroy did not win another match during the entire 1963 home-and-away season, failed to win a single match in the 1964 season, and did not experience another victory until the second round of the 1965 season.

== Latrobe ==
The following season he went to Tasmania where he became captain-coach of NWFU club Latrobe. He coached and played for four years resulting in 47 wins and 23 losses. His side were runners up in 1966.

== Death ==
Clark died on 24 March 1996, at the age of 59, following a brain tumour.
