= Fitzroy v Geelong (1963 VFL season) =

Football match in the 1963 Victorian Football League season

1963 VFL Round 10

Fitzroy	Geelong
9.13 (67)	3.13 (31)
	1	2	3	4
FITZ	3.4 (22)	3.7 (25)	8.11 (59)	9.13 (67)
GEEL	0.6 (6)	1.6 (12)	2.9 (21)	3.13 (31)
- Date: 6 July 1963
- Stadium: Brunswick Street Oval
- Attendance: 16,221
- Umpires: Charles Gaudion
- Coin toss won by: Fitzroy
- Kicked toward: The railway end (with the breeze)

In Round 10, 1963, a Victorian Football League (VFL) home-and-away match was played between Fitzroy and Geelong at Brunswick Street Oval in North Fitzroy. The game is most notable for winless Fitzroy defeating eventual premiers Geelong in an unfathomable upset, highlighting what would be Wally Clark's only game as coach. The performance, which was later given the unofficial title of the "Miracle Match", remains held in such fondness that a book commemorating the win was released in 2014, shortly after the match's fiftieth anniversary.

Attended by 16,221 spectators at Fitzroy's home ground, the match was one of the defining moments of the 1960s. (Note: According to (Spaull, 2014), it provided "one of the biggest upsets in that decade of VFL football".) Fitzroy, a young and inexperienced side that had yet to win a match in the 1963 season, unexpectedly and emphatically defeated Geelong 9.13 (67) to 3.13 (31). The Cats were a team that had finished second on the 1962 VFL ladder, had already won six, and drawn one, of its nine home-and-away matches, and would eventually go on to win the 1963 VFL grand final and premiership.

The match was characterized by the team strategies and individual player tactics implemented by stand-in coach Clark. Under his direction, Fitzroy adapted to the muddy conditions of the Brunswick Street Oval, effectively neutralizing Geelong players Polly Farmer and Bill Goggin to prevent them from combining their play. Additionally, the strategy held Geelong full-forward John Sharrock scoreless for the duration of the game.

Geelong Set for Easy Win

Today's League game at Fitzroy will see a battle between
two acting coaches — Wally Clark for the Maroons and
Geelong's Neil Tresize. . . .
Everything points to a win for Tresize and the Geelong
team, which is after its seventh victory for the season.
Fitzroy has yet to win a game this season, and it would
be expecting too much of the young players to break
through for their first win against a side as high on the
ladder as Geelong.
The Home side has lost its two most damaging players
to the inter-State side, [Kevin] Murray and rover Graham
Campbell.
The Cats will be without key players in full-forward Doug
Wade, and centreman Alistair Lord [both absent with the
inter-State side], but they have players capable of filling
the gaps adequately.
Good Stand-ins
New full-forward John Sharrock, in particular, should hold
down the full-forward post adequately. He kicked five goals
in the last [VFL] match against Richmond and six last week
against [a combined Ovens and Murray team at] Albury.
Sharper and more confident ball handling, plus
strength in and around the packs, should be Geelong's
main winning factors.
Geelong’s ruckmen, Graham Farmer, John Watts, John
Yeates and Fred Wooller, should have little trouble winning
the knockouts and holding control in the air.
The Age, Saturday, 6 July 1963 (emphasis in original).

== Background ==
Given that Fitzroy had lost the first nine home-and-away matches in the 1963 VFL season, and with its opponents being the powerful Geelong side that would go on to win the 1963 VFL premiership (14 of whom would play against Fitzroy on that day), nobody gave the Fitzroy team a chance.

The game was predicted to be such a one-sided affair that none of the Melbourne radio stations bothered to send a commentator to broadcast the match.

== Weather ==
Although the first half of the "split round" (Note: It was a "split round" because the VFL representative team was playing against Western Australia, in Perth, on 29 June 1963, and against South Australia, in Adelaide, on 6 July 1963.) matches had been played under relatively good conditions at Victoria Park, Princes Park, and the Junction Oval on 29 June 1963, the heavy rainfall that Melbourne experienced over the ensuing week had seriously affected the condition of all of the VFL grounds on the day of the match. (Note: As an example of the sorts of unsatisfactory ground conditions prevailing in the week before the Fitzroy vs. Geelong match, see the muddy, waterlogged condition of North Melbourne’s Arden Street Oval (situated just 2.5 miles or 4 kilometres away from the Brunswick Street Oval) in the photograph of Laurie Dwyer taken on Tuesday 2 July 1963:)

=== Postponement of Round 11 ===
It is also significant that, on the following Saturday morning (13 July 1963) — based upon reports that the majority of the grounds upon which games were scheduled to be played that afternoon "were completely waterlogged" — the VFL’s adverse weather committee made the unanimous decision to postpone all of the Round 11 matches until the following Saturday and, in the process, move each of the season's scheduled rounds to a week later.

The weather that Melbourne experienced over that weekend proved that the committee's decision was well justified — not only did the storms and heavy rainfall cause widespread flooding in the Glenroy (Merlynston Creek) and Elsternwick-Gardenvale (Elwood Canal) areas, extensive power outages over a wide range of suburbs, and the postponement of the entire Grand National Steeple meeting at the low-lying and water-logged Flemington Racecourse, but also forced the closure of the Newport to Altona railway line for several days. (Note: As an example of the sorts of muddy playing conditions and waterlogged states of the grounds that had caused the one-week postponement of the VFL’s fixture, see the photograph taken on Saturday 13 July 1963 (the day of the VFL’s postponement), at the Moorabbin Oval, during the VFA match between of Moorabbin and Port Melbourne:)

== Venue ==
In addition to the playing arena itself being rather low-lying and very poorly drained — a situation that meant that whenever there was heavy rain, the Brunswick Street Oval had a strong tendency to be very muddy and seriously waterlogged for weeks on end — the long, thin, and (comparatively) rectangular shape of Fitzroy's home ground, even when completely dry, always demanded significant tactical adjustments in visiting teams, especially those accustomed to playing their matches on wide, and (comparatively) circular-shaped oval football fields such as the Melbourne Cricket Ground.

== Teams ==
The Fitzroy selectors made eight changes to the previous round's team: five of which were "forced" upon them, (Note: The team's captain-coach, Kevin Murray, and its regular first rover, Graham Campbell, were both absent with the Victorian Interstate squad. Three other players, Geoff Doubleday, Joe Dixon, and Ted Lovett, were unavailable; each having returned to their respective country clubs) and three which were not. (Note: The selectors dropped Stewart Duncan and Brett Pollock to the Reserves and, as well, relegated Ray Slocum to the bench as 20th man) The selected team was very inexperienced; it had seven teenagers, and only six members of the team had played more than 18 senior games.

The Geelong selectors made five changes to the previous round's team: two of which were "forced" upon them, (Note: The team's coach, Bob Davis, full-forward Doug Wade, and centreman, Alistair Lord were absent in South Australia with the Victorian Interstate squad.) and three which were not. (Note: The selectors selected Fred Wooller (ruck) and Hugh Routley (wing), both of whom were returning from injury, Garry Hamer (forward-flank), John Watts (resting back-pocket ruck), and Bill Miller (centre, replacing Alistair Lord); they also moved John Sharrock to full-forward (replacing Doug Wade), dropped Geoff Rosenow and Eric Nicholls, and relegated Brian Brushfield to the bench as 19th man) The selected team was far more experienced than the Fitzroy team: eleven, including Polly Farmer, with a total of 190 WANFL and VFL games, had played more than 35 senior games over a number of seasons, and fourteen would later play in the 1963 VFL Grand Final and win the 1963 premiership.

The coaches for the day were Wally Clark, the captain-coach of the Fitzroy reserves, (Note: Having played with Fitzroy's Firsts, Seconds, and Thirds (under-19s) over more than a decade, Wally Clark retired from senior football at the end of the 1962 VFL season, having played 105 senior games over eight seasons (1955-1962) and was in 1962 the team's top goal-scorer with 21 goals. He was appointed captain-coach of the Fitzroy Reserves for the 1963 season, and would go on to win the Reserve Grade's best and fairest award, the Gardiner Medal.) and Neil Trezise, the coach of the Geelong reserves. (Note: Tresize retired from senior football at the end of the 1959 VFL season, having played 185 senior games over eleven seasons from 1949 to 1959. He was appointed Geelong Reserves captain-coach for the 1960 season (winning the Gardiner Medal in 1960), and continued to serve as captain-coach for another two seasons in 1961 and 1962. He was the non-playing coach of the Reserves in 1963.) This was the only occasion that either of them ever coached a VFL senior team.

Fitzroy
B:	Brian Carroll; 22yrs; 2 games	Allen Lynch; 24yrs; 53 games	Norm Brown; 19yrs; 12 games
HB:	Brian Pert; 27yrs; 94 games	David Sykes; 20yrs; 15 games	Bob Beattie; 19yrs; 16 games
C:	Wayne Eastman; 21yrs; 12 games	John Bahen; 19yrs; 18 games	Colin Sleep; 18yrs; 6 games
HF:	Tony Hirst; 18yrs; 1 game	Ron Harvey (c); 27yrs; 118 games	Brian Beers; 24yrs; 69 games
F:	Max Miers; 22yrs; 17 games	Gary Lazarus; 17yrs; 9 games	Ian McCrae; 19yrs; 10 games
Foll:	Bryan Clements; 20yrs; 11 games	Ron Fry; 26yrs; 4 games	John Hayes; 23yrs; 38 games
Res:	Barry Fitzgerald; 24yrs; debut	Ray Slocum; 25yrs; 83 games	
Coach:	Wally Clark: Debut as First XVIII coach.		

Geelong
B:	Terry Callan; 24 yrs; 51 games	Roy West; 22 yrs; 48 games	John Watts; 26 yrs; 8 games
HB:	Stewart Lord; 23 yrs; 43 games	Ken Goodland; 22 yrs; 40 games	John Devine; 23 yrs; 53 games
C:	Hugh Routley; 23 yrs; 11 games	Bill Miller; 27 yrs; 36 games	Peter Walker; 21 yrs; 26 games
HF:	Garry Hamer; 20 yrs; 30 games	Bill Ryan; 18 yrs; 1 game	Ian Williams; 21 yrs; 1 game
F:	Tony Polinelli; 20 yrs; 16 games	John Sharrock; 19 yrs; 9 games	John Yeates; 24 yrs; 57 games
Foll:	Graham Farmer; 28 yrs; 14 VFL games 176 WAFL games	Fred Wooller (c); 24 yrs; 104 games	Bill Goggin; 22 yrs; 77 games
Res:	Brian Brushfield; 19 yrs; 7 games	Paul Vinar; 23 yrs; 73 games	
Coach:	Neil Trezise: Debut as First XVIII coach.		

== Lead-up ==
On the evening before the match, Wally Clark called all of the Fitzroy players together and quietly, thoroughly, and carefully explained — in very clear, precise, and simple terms — how all of them were to play (collectively) as a team, how each of them was to play as an individual and, in particular, how each of them was to play, on the day, against their specific opponent.

Clark methodically stressed the importance, regardless of the end to which the team was kicking, of attacking along the dryer (northern) grandstand side of the ground, and defending along the far more water-logged (southern) "outer" side of the ground. He demanded that they concentrate on tackling hard and keeping close to their opponents at all times, and that they continuously back each other up — and, as often as they could, use the handball directly to the team-mate that was backing up. In general play, he instructed them to keep their opponents between themselves and the boundary: see, for instance, the two-on-one tackle in the photograph at McFarlane (2014).

He spoke of the degree to which left-footed players such as Polly Farmer, Tony Pollinelli, Garry Hamer and John Sharrock could be destabilised by coming at them from their right side: see for example, the photograph of Norm Brown and John Hayes, coming in together from the centre of the ground, on the right side of the left-footer Garry Hamer, who is on the boundary side of the ground. In particular, he instructed the comparatively inexperienced ruckman, Bryan Clements — whose last 10 senior games, over three seasons (1961–1963) had been with losing Fitzroy teams, and who had been specifically promoted from the seconds for this special reason — to come in from the right side of Farmer at each bounce and boundary throw-in, bump him, and allow the other (even less experienced) Fitzroy ruckman, Ron Fry (in only his fourth VFL game), to go for the hit-out unimpeded and unchallenged. (Note: At 6 feet 5 inches (196 cm), Bryan Clements was 2.0 inches or 5 centimetres taller than Farmer’s 6 feet 3 inches (191 cm); at 6 feet 2 inches (187 cm), Ron Fry was 1.6 inches or 4 centimetres shorter than Farmer.)

== Match summary ==
=== Lower grades ===
On the day of the match Geelong's second XVIII (reserves) had already won their game against Fitzroy, 8.13 (61) to 4.8 (32). Concurrent to the senior game, Geelong's third XVIII (under-19s) would defeat Fitzroy 10.11 (71) to 6.10 (46) at Kardinia Park.

=== Pre-match ===
Prior to delivering his pre-game address to the team, Wally Clark made sure that each individual player clearly understood and could remember the instructions they had been given on the previous evening.

"A key factor in us winning the game was how (Clark) mentally prepared us. The frame of mind we were in was just incredible. We went out there to face Goliath, and they went out there to face David, and that was the difference in the two teams. And that was all because of Wally Clark. I don’t remember running onto the ground, he just had us so worked up. We all played roles on the field, but Wally Clark was the star that day." — Bryan Clements' 2014 recollection of the day.

=== First quarter ===
The Fitzroy captain, Ron Harvey, won the toss and elected to kick, with the breeze, to the (northern) railway end, which also meant that the Fitzroy team's right-hand side was on the comparatively dryer grandstand side of the muddy and waterlogged ground.

"The young Lions . . . [who] were going in for the ball with a ton of determination . . . bewildered the Cats from the start and their marking, handball and teamwork shocked the Cats"; and Fitzroy scored 3.4 (22) — with full-forward Gary Lazarus scoring two goals and forward-pocket Max Miers one goal — with under-pressure Geelong scoring only 6 behinds from eight shots at goal.

=== Second quarter ===
In the second quarter, and kicking against the breeze, "the Lions were hanging on to their [16-point] lead with a grim determination . . . [its] defenders were hurling themselves in for the ball and [Geelong] could not break through" While Fitzroy were able to score three behinds, Geelong, kicking to the scoring end, could only manage a single goal, and Fitzroy went in to the half-time break leading 3.7 (25) to Geelong’s 1.6 (12).

=== Half-time ===
Once again, in a Fitzroy room filled with enthusiastic supporters, Clark delivered an inspiring speech.

=== Third quarter ===
"Fitzroy led by 13 points at half time, and what looked like a possible win became a certainty in the third term as it piled on 5.4 to [Geelong’s] 1.3."

=== Final quarter ===
Despite Geelong's efforts, kicking to the scoring end, the team was only able to reduce its third-quarter deficit of 38 points by two points — scoring 1.4 (10) to Fitzroy's 1.2 (8).

== Reception ==
According to the football correspondent of The Age, "with eight men in the side who had not played in the previous round, the eager Lions outplayed Geelong in every phase of the game . . . [and] as the game progressed they not only outmarked and outscored the Cats, but also beat them at their own fast, play-on game" — "Fitzroy, winning in nearly all positions, not only "broke the ice" against Geelong on Saturday . . . it shattered it" — and, moreover, he stressed, although the final score seemed to indicate that Geelong, which had "six shots fewer than Fitzroy", had "[fallen] down badly in attack", the real reason for "this inaccuracy" is that it had been "caused by the strong play of Fitzroy's defenders".

Brian Pert was declared the "best on ground" for his outstanding performance in the match.

Given Wally Clark's specific pre-match instructions, it is significant that, not only did "the Lions' plan to nullify star ruckman Polly Farmer . . . [with Clements] bumping Farmer at the throw-ins and bounces while teammate Fry went for the hit out . . . [prove to be] an outstanding success . . . [but also] Farmer's eclipse [not only] made hard work for the Geelong rovers Bill Goggin and Tony Polinelli [but], at the same time, turned Fitzroy rover John Hayes into a damaging player", and, as well, although they kicked a number of behinds (Hamer, one; Sharrock, three, and Polinelli, four), none of Geelong's left-footers scored a single goal during the game.

== Aftermath ==
=== Fitzroy ===
This extraordinary performance, undoubtedly a consequence of Wally Clark’s meticulous planning, strongly contrasts with the fact that not only did Fitzroy fail to win another match during the entire 1963 home-and-away season, it also failed to win a single match in the 1964 season. Its next victory was not until the second round of the 1965 season under a new non-playing coach, Bill Stephen, who had returned to Fitzroy after spending seven years as captain-coach and later non-playing coach of the Yarrawonga Football Club in the Ovens & Murray Football League. In other words, given that Kevin Murray did not coach the team on that day, the Fitzroy team was absolutely winless for Murray's entire two-season and 34-match captain-coach career. (Note: Although the Fitzroy team played in 36 matches over the two seasons of Murray's tenure, he was absent on two occasions. On 6 July 1963, Murray was absent on interstate duties in South Australia, and Wally Clark, captain-coach of the Reserves, coached the team to its victory over Geelong. On 6 June 1964, Murray was absent on interstate duties in South Australia, and under-19s coach Tommy Williams coached the team to its loss to Melbourne.)

=== Geelong ===
The Geelong Football Club was so concerned about the comprehensive and overwhelming nature of the Fitzroy victory that, three days later, on Tuesday, 9 July 1963, the club convened a special 100-minute meeting between all of the club’s senior players and all of the members of the club's selection committee. Following this meeting, the team won nineteen of its next twenty-one matches, including the 1963 grand final.

=== Wally Clark ===
In the following season (1964), Wally Clark was appointed captain-coach of the Latrobe Football Club in the Tasmanian North West Football Union. He held the position for four seasons (1964–1967), winning the competition's best-and-fairest award, the Wander Medal, in 1964.

== See also ==
- Brisbane Lions v Geelong (2013 AFL season)

== Sources ==
- Lawrence, John (8 July 1963). "Cats had No Answer to Fitzroy's Game". The Age. p. 19.
- Lord, Sam (17 July 2014). "The Miracle Match". lions.com.au. "Wally Clark is at the left front, Brian Pert is fifth from the left, Gary Lazarus is third from the right, and Norm Brown is at the far right of the photograph"
- McDonald, Ian (6 July 1963). "Lions have Shock Win". The Sporting Globe.
- Piesse, Ken (2014). "The Day David Downed Goliath". australianfootball.com.
- Piesse, Ken (2014). Miracle Match: The Day David Downed Goliath, Brunswick St, July 6, 1963. Mt Eliza: Ken Piesse Football & Cricket Books. ISBN 978-0-992522-80-3.
- Spaull, Roger (18 May 2014). "Bryan Clements -- Fitzroy FC -- A Day to Remember at the Brunswick Street Oval". Boyles Football Photos.
- Wells, Samuel Garnet (8 July 1963). "The Ups and Downs of Sport". The Age (Cartoon). p. 17.
