= 1963 VFL grand final =

Grand final of the 1963 Victorian Football League season

1963 VFL Grand Final

Geelong	Hawthorn
15.19 (109)	8.12 (60)
	1	2	3	4
GEE	3.3 (21)	7.10 (52)	9.13 (67)	15.19 (109)
HAW	3.6 (24)	5.6 (36)	8.9 (57)	8.12 (60)
- Date: 5 October 1963
- Stadium: Melbourne Cricket Ground
- Attendance: 101,209

The 1963 VFL Grand Final was an Australian rules football game contested between the Geelong Football Club and Hawthorn Football Club, held at the Melbourne Cricket Ground in Melbourne on 5 October 1963. It was the 66th annual Grand Final of the Victorian Football League, staged to determine the premiers for the 1963 VFL season. The match, attended by 101,209 spectators, was won by Geelong by a margin of 49 points, marking that club's sixth premiership victory.

== Background ==
Hawthorn were minor premiers as a result of their superior percentage, as both clubs had finished the home and away season with 13 wins and a draw.

Geelong was contesting its eighth VFL grand final and chasing its sixth premiership, having most recently contested in 1953 and last won in 1952. The Hawks were contesting their second VFL grand final, having beaten Footscray to win their maiden premiership in 1961. For the Cats, this was the third consecutive match they were playing against Hawthorn, having met at Glenferrie Oval in the final round of the home-and-away season, then in the second semi-final two weeks later.

After the Cats' important win at Glenferrie, coach Bob Davis, when asked by a reporter what he thought of Hawthorn, called them "the roughest, dirtiest side that [he] had ever seen" and that "Any time they want to play football, we'll give them a hiding". Davis later admitted he didn't care what he said at the time, and Hawthorn coach John Kennedy Sr. took offence at Davis' comments about dirty play, stating that while his team certainly played a vigorous brand of football, he never asked players to deliberately "fix up" opposition players.

== Teams ==
Geelong	Hawthorn

Geelong
B:	Ian Scott	Roy West	John Watts
HB:	John Devine	Peter Walker	Stewart Lord
C:	Hugh Routley	Alistair Lord	John Brown
HF:	Gordon Hynes	Fred Wooller (c)	John Sharrock
F:	John Yeates	Doug Wade	Colin Rice
Foll:	Graham Farmer	Paul Vinar	Bill Goggin
Res:	Ken Goodland	Tony Polinelli	
Coach:	Bob Davis		

Hawthorn
B:	David Parkin	Phil Hay	Graham Cooper
HB:	Sted Hay	Garry Young	Cam McPherson
C:	John Fisher	Ron Nalder	Colin Youren
HF:	Graham Arthur (c)	Kevin Coverdale	Ian Mort
F:	Rodney Olsson	John Peck	David Albiston
Foll:	Ken Beck	Allan Woodley	Ian Law
Res:	Peter Lyon	Kevin Connell	
Coach:	John Kennedy		

Umpire – Jeff Crouch

== Scorecard ==
1963 VFL Grand Final
Saturday, 5 October 2:50pm	Hawthorn	def. by	Geelong	MCG (crowd: 101,209)	Report
3.6 (24); 5.6 (36); 8.9 (57); 8.12 (60)	Q1; Q2; Q3; Final	3.3 (21); 7.10 (52); 9.13 (67); 15.19 (109)	Umpires: Crouch; Television broadcast: Seven Network
Peck 3 Woodley, Law, Coverdale, Mort, Fisher 1	Goals	3 Wooller, Hynes; 2 Yeates, Goggin, Rice, A Lord; 1 Wade
Arthur, Nalder, Coverdale, Mort, Young, Youren, P Hay, Law, Fisher	Best	Farmer, Devine, Scott, Goggin, Walker, West, Watts, Hynes
Gate takings £31,216

== Bibliography ==
- Atkinson, Graeme; Atkinson, Brant (2009). The Complete Book of AFL Finals (4th ed.). Scoresby, Victoria: The Five Mile Press. ISBN 9781742112756.
- Hawke, Steve (2014). Polly Farmer (2nd ed.). Richmond, Victoria: The Slattery Media Group. ISBN 9780992363154.
- Ross, John, ed. (1996). 100 Years of Australian Football 1897–1996: The Complete Story of the AFL, All the Big Stories, All the Great Pictures, All the Champions, Every AFL Season Reported. Ringwood, Victoria: Viking. ISBN 0-670-86814-0.

== See also ==
- 1963 VFL season
- "1963 VFL Grand Final Souvenir Edition". The Football Record. Vol. 52, no. 33. Victorian Football League. 5 October 1963 – via State Library of Victoria.
