= Polly Farmer =

Australian rules footballer and coach (1935–2019)

Polly Farmer MBE
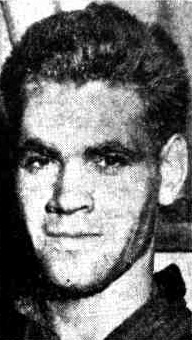
- Farmer in 1954

Personal information
- Full name: Graham Vivian Farmer
- Nickname: Polly
- Born: 10 March 1935; North Fremantle, Western Australia
- Died: 14 August 2019 (aged 84); Murdoch, Western Australia
- Original team: Maddington (SSFA)
- Height: 191 cm (6 ft 3 in)
- Weight: 94 kg (207 lb)
- Position: Ruckman

Playing career^{1}
Years	Club	Games (Goals)
1953–1961	East Perth	176 (157)
1962–1967	Geelong	101 (65)
1968–1971	West Perth	79 (55)
Total		356 (277)

Representative team honours
Years	Team	Games (Goals)
1955–1971	Western Australia	31 (19)
1963–1965	Victoria	6 (6)

International team honours
1968	Australia	

Coaching career^{3}
Years	Club	Games (W–L–D)
1968–1971	West Perth	91 (60–29–2)
1973–1975	Geelong	66 (24–42–0)
1976–1977	East Perth	45 (30–15–0)
1970–1971, 1977	Western Australia	6 (2–4–0)
Total		208 (116-90-2)
- ^{1} Playing statistics correct to the end of 1971.^{3} Coaching statistics correct as of 1977.

Career highlights
- Club: VFL Premiership player: (1963); 5× WANFL premiership player: (1956, 1958, 1959, 1969, 1971); 3× Sandover Medal: (1956, 1957, 1960); 2× Carji Greeves Medal: (1963, 1964); 7× East Perth Best and Fairest: (1954, 1955, 1956, 1957, 1959, 1960, 1961); West Perth Best and Fairest: (1969); 2× Simpson Medal (grand final): (1959, 1969); Geelong captain: (1965–1967); Geelong Team of the Century; West Perth Team of the Century; East Perth Post War Team of the Century; Representative: Tassie Medal: (1956); National Football Carnival Championship: 1961; 3× All-Australian team: (1956, 1958, 1961); 2× Simpson Medal (interstate): (1956, 1961); Overall: Australian Football Hall of Fame – Legend Status (inaugural); AFL Team of the Century; Western Australian Team of the Century – vice-captain; Indigenous Team of the Century – captain

Graham Vivian "Polly" Farmer MBE (10 March 1935 – 14 August 2019) was an Australian rules footballer who played for the Geelong Football Club in the Victorian Football League (VFL) and the East Perth Football Club and West Perth Football Club in the Western Australian National Football League (WANFL).

Born in Western Australia and of indigenous heritage through his Noongar mother, Farmer is considered one of the greatest footballers in the game's history; when the Australian Football Hall of Fame was established in 1996, Farmer was among the 12 inaugural players given "legend" status. He is primarily recognised for the way he revolutionised ruckwork and handballing.

After retiring as a player, Farmer returned to Geelong to become the VFL's first coach of indigenous background, and he was also named coach of Western Australia's first State of Origin team.

The Graham Farmer Freeway in his hometown of Perth is named in his honour.

== Early life ==
Farmer was born at the Hillcrest Maternity Home in North Fremantle to an unknown man and 25-year-old Noongar woman from Katanning named Eva. At the time of Farmer's birth, Australia was slowly recovering from the Great Depression, and Auber Neville was Western Australia's Chief Protector of Aborigines. In December 1936, Farmer was voluntarily placed in the care of Sister Kate's orphanage in Queens Park, Western Australia, a home for "half-caste" children. Farmer never found out why he had been put there, though it is presumed that Farmer's unmarried mother did not have the means to provide for him.

Nonetheless, Farmer was grateful to Sister Kate's for his upbringing: "If it had not been for Sister Kate's, I would have had an ice block's hope in hell of ever leading a normal life. I owe her and all her dedicated helpers everything – for giving me the chance to make something of myself. I was one of the lucky ones." A bout of poliomyelitis left Farmer with his left leg shorter than his right leg. According to Farmer, he was nicknamed "Polly the Parrot" as a six-year-old because people thought he chattered away like a parrot. At high school, Farmer was spotted by talent scouts for the East Perth Football Club and joined the team.

== Football career ==
=== East Perth ===
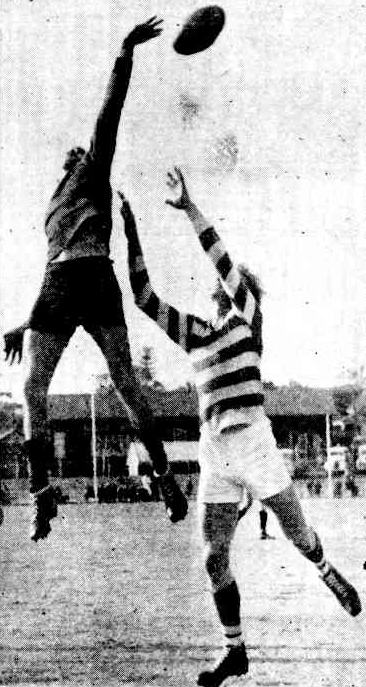
Farmer flies high over Jack Clarke of East Fremantle in 1954

Farmer began his top-level career in the West Australian Football League (WAFL), known then as the West Australian National Football League (WANFL), with the East Perth Football Club in 1953. He played 176 games from 1953 to 1961 with East Perth. During this time he won the club's fairest and best award seven times and was a member of their 1956, 1958 and 1959 premiership teams. In 1956, he was awarded a Simpson Medal for his performance against South Australia at the Perth Carnival and later was also awarded the Tassie Medal for being judged best at the carnival overall. He was awarded the WANFL's highest individual honour, the Sandover Medal, in 1956 and 1960. He also tied for the medal in 1957 with East Fremantle's Jack Clarke but lost on a countback; he was awarded that medal in 1997 when the WAFL awarded retrospective medals for those who missed out on countbacks. In 1959, he was awarded the Simpson Medal for being best on ground in the grand final. He was awarded another Simpson Medal in 1961 for his game against Victoria at the Brisbane Carnival.

=== Geelong ===
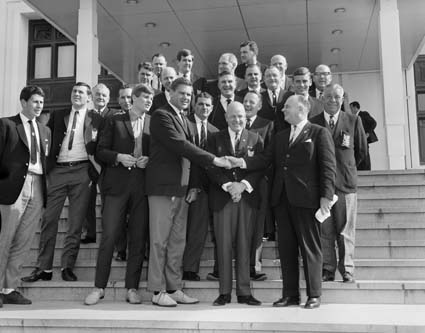
Farmer in October 1966 as captain of Geelong, shaking hands with government minister and former cycling champion Hubert Opperman as his teammates look on

Farmer had clear ambitions to play football in Victoria, and had attracted interest from Victorian clubs; at the end of 1955 he was signed by the Richmond Football Club for £200 (as was not uncommon at the time), but the move was blocked by East Perth, and he remained in Perth for the next six years. He was later recruited by Bob Davis to the Geelong Football Club in 1962. In the opening moments of his debut for Geelong in 1962, Farmer severely injured a knee, causing ligament damage and missed the rest of the season. He returned in 1963, winning a premiership with Geelong and coming equal-second in the Brownlow Medal behind Bob Skilton. Farmer played 101 games for Geelong from 1962 to 1968, won the team's fairest and best award in 1963 and 1964 and captained the team from 1965 until 1967.

On 6 July 1963 he was a member of the Geelong team that were comprehensively and unexpectedly beaten by Fitzroy, 9.13 (67) to 3.13 (31) in the 1963 Miracle Match.

Farmer practised handballing through car windows at the car yard where he worked and one of his football legacies is changing handballing from a last-resort option to a "dangerous offensive weapon". According to Geelong player Sam Newman, "without speaking one word he [Farmer] taught me everything I know. I watched how a man overcomes not the physical, not the mental, but the spiritual – that's the most important – he was an absolute star, about one decade, one century ahead of his time".

One tactic opposition players tried in order to distract Farmer was racial abuse, but to no avail, as he related to historian Sean Gorman:

I never took any notice of it. I think anything that was said out on the field was to put people off, but it didn’t break my concentration and when I was called names I’d look at myself and say to myself well I can’t see it. It never worried me. I still was called ‘You boong, you nigger.’ That was understandable because you do anything to try and put people off their game. I didn’t go out of my way to chase people and thump them because they called me a boong.

=== West Perth ===
In 1968, Farmer desired to return home to Western Australia. Although he had trained briefly with East Perth during 1967 as part of a testimonial to retired Royal teammate "Square" Kilmurray, Farmer accepted the role of captain/coach with the West Perth Football Club, rivals to his former club, East Perth. He led West Perth to premierships in 1969 and 1971, both times defeating East Perth in the grand final. In 1969, Farmer received his fourth Simpson Medal during the AFC Championships in Adelaide, and also played his 300th career game during the season.

In 1971, he played his 346th career game in Round 11 (245th in the WANFL) to break David "Dolly" Christy's long-standing elite Australian rules football games record, and also became the first player in elite Australian rules football to play 350 career games. Farmer retired after the Grand Final aged 36, after 79 games with West Perth and a career total of 356 games, which remained a record until broken by Kevin Murray in Round 2 of the 1974 VFL season (Murray retired at the end of that season with 377 games in the VFL and WANFL).

=== Other matches ===
Farmer also played 37 games in interstate football – 31 for Western Australia and six games for Victoria – along with four International Rules matches on the 1968 Australian Football World Tour: if these are considered, he played a total of 397 career senior games.

Farmer's total remained a record until broken by Murray in either of Round 13 of 1974 (using the VFL/AFL's totals) or Round 18 of 1973 (using his overall total): Murray retired at the end of 1974 with 407 (using the VFL/AFL's totals) or 424 (using his overall total) career senior games.

== Non-playing coach ==
Not involved in top-level football in 1972, Farmer returned to the VFL as coach of the Geelong Football Club in time for the 1973 VFL season. Shortly after taking up the position, Farmer travelled to Canberra in an attempt to personally persuade Manuka Football Club's star rover Edney Blackaby to join Geelong. Blackaby had signed a Form Four with the Cats, but not even Farmer's star power and a lucrative contract were enough to convince Blackaby to leave Canberra.
Farmer's tenure as Geelong coach was generally regarded as a disappointment, with a sixth-placed finish in 1974 their best result. One issue was that he assumed his players would adhere to all training instructions and be disciplined in their preparation, just as he was in his playing days. He also found it difficult to relate to players who were less naturally gifted. Farmer and the club's committee had an increasingly strained relationship and Farmer quit in 1975. A six-game losing streak in the second half of the season spelled the end of Farmer's time as coach. Geelong ensured that he bowed out on a positive note with a surprise 26-point win over Fitzroy at VFL Park.

Farmer returned to the WANFL, coaching East Perth from 1976 to 1977 with some success and he coached the first Western Australian state of origin team in 1977. Farmer was sacked as coach of East Perth in 1977 due to conflict and replaced by Barry Cable in 1978. Farmer said, "When the going gets tough a club should stick together and fight to beat it. But some people chip and chip at the ground underneath you in trying to find someone to blame. I do my best in football and I have no time to protect my back, so it's left wide open. Maybe that's a lot of my trouble."

== Personal life and death ==
In 1956, Farmer met Marlene Gray, a Tasmanian woman holidaying in Perth. They married in 1957 and had three children: two sons, Brett and Dean, and daughter Kim. In the 1960s, former Geelong player Neil Trezise approached Farmer about representing the Australian Labor Party in the seat of Corio. Farmer declined.

The couple sold their house in 1992 and ran a two-star Southway Auto Lodge motel in South Perth until 1998. Farmer said the business failed due to the downturn in the Asian economy and a 40% drop in tourist numbers. It left him with no money or assets. He said, "We have nothing and we are back to square one. But we didn't borrow money to keep the business going. All my life I have helped myself and there is no reason why I can't still do that." Farmer and Marlene were given temporary accommodation at the caretaker's flat in the Main Roads building. Two fundraising events were organised in Perth and Melbourne by John Watts, Bob Davis and Sam Newman, raising $120,000. A trust fund was established with the money and a small villa was bought in Innaloo.

In 1999, Farmer was diagnosed with Alzheimer's disease, but it was not until 2012 that his wife Marlene, who was battling breast cancer, decided to reveal it publicly. He died at the Fiona Stanley Hospital on 14 August 2019, aged 84. He was given a state funeral, held at Perth Stadium, on 26 August. He was survived by his three children, his wife Marlene having died in 2015.

After his death, Farmer's brain was donated to the Australian Sports Brain Bank. A study of his brain by researchers at the bank identified chronic traumatic encephalopathy. Farmer is the first former VFL/AFL player to be diagnosed with the condition.

== Legacy ==
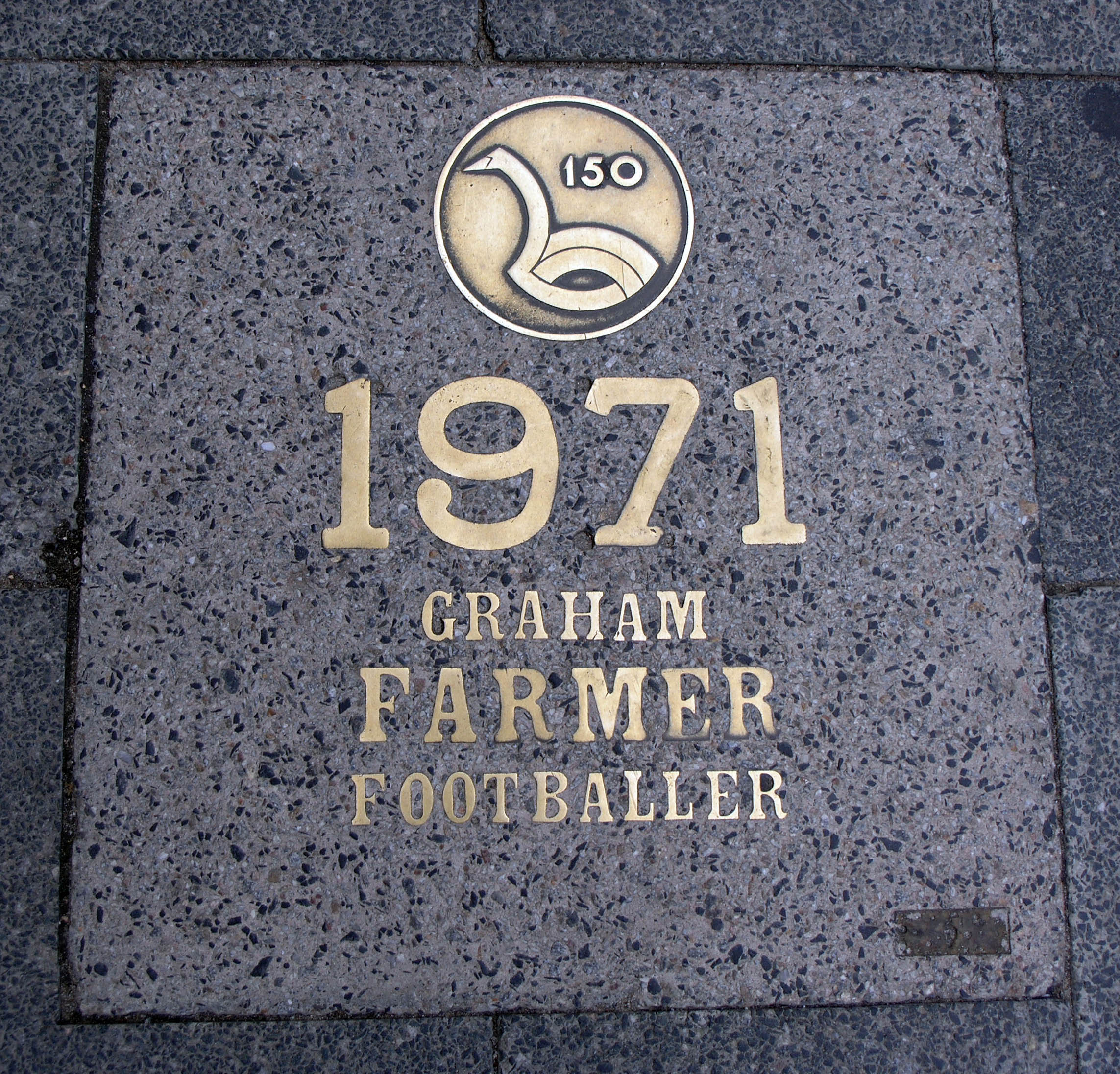
St Georges Terrace bronze tablet

In 1971, Farmer became the first Australian footballer to receive a Queen's honour when he was named a Member of the Order of the British Empire (MBE) in the New Year honours list. Farmer's name was included in the 150 bronze tablets set into the footpath along St Georges Terrace that commemorate notable figures in Western Australia's history, as part of the WAY 1979 celebrations. He was inducted into the Sport Australia Hall of Fame in 1985.

In 1994, Steve Hawke, author and son of former prime minister Bob Hawke, met with Farmer to discuss writing his biography. In return, Farmer asked for Hawke's help to create the Polly Farmer Foundation, an organization dedicated to supporting indigenous children in their sporting and academic endeavours. Farmer explained, "I want the foundation to be of practical assistance to young Aboriginal people with potential to do something with their lives … Not just sport, but in the professions and business. We want to develop links with the tertiary institutions and make sure Aboriginal people become leaders." Hawke enlisted the help of recently retired federal politicians Ron Edwards and Fred Chaney to establish the foundation, and was joined by Sir Ronald Wilson, a former High Court judge; and Greg Durham, chief executive of the Geelong Football Club.

On 6 October 1997, Western Australian Transport Minister Eric Charlton announced that the $400 m Northern City Bypass would be named the Graham Farmer Freeway. Charlton said, "He already has a place in WA sporting folklore and it is fitting that a showpiece of the city's transport network should bear his name… The northern traffic bypass system links West Perth and East Perth which are, coincidentally, the two districts which Graham Farmer represented with distinction on the football arena".

He was inducted into the inaugural Australian Football Hall of Fame in 1996 as one of the twelve official "Legends" and then into the West Australian Football Hall of Fame in 2004. He has been nominated as the first ruckman in every Team of the Century for each of the two leagues and three clubs for which he participated, plus the Indigenous Team of the Century, in which he was the captain. In 2008, Farmer was named at number 5 in The Age's top football players of all time. Farmer is depicted contesting a boundary throw-in with Carlton ruckman John Nicholls (the other ruckman in the AFL Team of the Century) in Jamie Cooper's painting The Game That Made Australia, commissioned by the AFL in 2008 to celebrate the 150th anniversary of the sport.

Farmer is also depicted in the rare 1963 Scanlens football card series, which, due to production problems during the printing process, is now considered one of the rarest and most valuable trading cards in Australia.

Upon Farmer's death, tributes came flowing in from his contemporaries. Carlton legend John Nicholls, whose ruck rivalry with Farmer was compulsory viewing for football fans in the 1960s, reflected fondly on their on-field contests and enduring friendship:

As a person, ‘Polly’ was a good man. He has been a friend of mine for the best part of 60 years. As a player he was talked about as ahead of his time . . . and he was a freak. ‘Polly’ and I probably played against each other 15 or 20 times. In all those times I can honestly say I don’t think he ever beat me - but then again, I don’t think I beat him either. We probably nullified each other. At ruck contests the pair of us used to take two or three steps - never a long run. At centre bounces he jumped early and umpires like Jeff Crouch used to let him get away with it. I gave away height to ‘Polly’ and I realized that if I jumped at the same time as him I was gone, so I jumped into him early, body on body, and I was successful at it because I had a good spring. [...] He was one of the first to really perfect the art of handballing. He was very good at it. He was a brilliant footballer, I learnt a lot from him, he made me a better player and I respected him. He was a good friend of mine, a very good friend.

Fellow Western Australian indigenous football legend Barry Cable, whose career overlapped with Farmer, reflected on his unique style of ruck play:

I don’t think there’s any doubt he was the greatest ruckman in Aussie rules – he led the way in that area, he had a very unique game. People say he changed the style of ruckman but I feel he was the only one who could do what he could do. He had a special game and ruck play all of his own, and no one has ever been able to follow it. There was no one who did it before him and no one’s ever done it after him.

On behalf of the AFL, chief executive Gillon McLachlan issued this statement:

When discussing ruckmen, every player who saw him play or took the field against him, deferred to Polly. Our game has always started in the centre square, with a contest between two big men, and Polly was the greatest of all the big men who seek to set the standard of competitiveness for their teams, lead from the front at every contest and compel their teammates to match their skills and commitment in the pursuit of victory. Beyond football, as a proud Noongar man, he was a leader for the Aboriginal community and his standing in the game and in society enabled his people to believe that they too could reach the peaks and achieve their best potential. He laid the path for so many great footballers from Aboriginal and Torres Strait Islander communities to come into the elite levels of the game and showcase their skills. At every point of his career, his teams found success on the field, thanks largely to his dominance that built a record that few players could ever hope to match.

== Bibliography ==
- Cartledge, Elliot (2013). Footy's Glory Days : The greatest era of the greatest game. Richmond, Victoria: Hardie Grant Books. ISBN 9781742705880.
- Hawke, Steve (2014). Polly Farmer (2nd ed.). Slattery Media Group. ISBN 9780992363154.
