= Bill Goggin =

Australian rules footballer (born 1941)

Personal information
- Born: 4 January 1941 (age 85)
- Original team: North Geelong
- Height: 175 cm (5 ft 9 in)
- Weight: 70 kg (154 lb)

Playing career^{1}
Years	Club	Games (Goals)
1958–1971	Geelong	248 (279)

Representative team honours
Years	Team	Games (Goals)
	Victoria	14 (22)

Coaching career^{3}
Years	Club	Games (W–L–D)
1976–1978	Footscray	46 (21–23–2)
1980–1982	Geelong	71 (41–30–0)
Total		117 (62–53–2)
- ^{1} Playing statistics correct to the end of 1971.^{3} Coaching statistics correct as of 1982.

Career highlights
- VFL Premiership player: (1963); 2× Carji Greeves Medal: (1967, 1970); Geelong captain: (1968-1971); Geelong Team of the Century; Australian Football Hall of Fame, inducted 2000

William Goggin (born 4 January 1941) is a former Australian rules footballer who played for the Geelong Football Club in the Victorian Football League (VFL). He later coached Geelong and also the Footscray Football Club.

== Family ==
His brother Matt also played for Geelong, and other brother Charlie is a racehorse trainer in Tasmania. Charlie's son Mathew Goggin, is a golfer on the PGA Tour.

== Football ==
A member of the Australian Football Hall of Fame, Goggin was one of the VFL's finest rovers during his era, forming a memorable combination with legendary ruckman Polly Farmer and full forward Doug Wade. He was also a regular Big V representative, both as a player and coach.

On 6 July 1963 he was a member of the Geelong team that were comprehensively and unexpectedly beaten by Fitzroy, 9.13 (67) to 3.13 (31) in the 1963 Miracle Match.

== Coach ==
After retiring from the VFL, Goggin coached Geelong West in the Victorian Football Association from 1972 until 1975. He led the club to the 1972 Division 2 premiership, a season in which the club was undefeated, and then to its first and only Division 1 premiership in 1975. He also played with the club in its 1972 premiership, and coached the club again to a Grand Final in 1979. He was also the coach of Victoria in State of Origin games on more than several occasions.

Goggin coached Geelong to successive Preliminary final appearances in 1980 and 1981, losing on both occasions to Collingwood in tight games. After Geelong only won seven games and crashed to ninth in 1982, Goggin contacted the club shortly after the end of the home-and-away rounds to say he would not seek reappointment as coach for the following season. He subsequently took up a board position at the club.

== Australian Football Hall of Fame ==
He was inducted into the Australian Football Hall of Fame in 2000. His citation read "Famous for roving to Graham "Polly" Farmer and pinpointing Doug Wade up forward."

== Athletics ==
Goggin was also an accomplished sprinter, competing on the professional running circuit in the mid-1960s. He won the 1964 Ballarat Gift.

== See also ==
- 1963 Miracle Match
