= Rutley =

Rutley is a surname. Notable people with the surname include:

- Brandon Rutley (born 1989), Canadian football running back
- David Rutley (born 1961), UK Conservative politician, Member of Parliament for Macclesfield
- Frank Rutley (1842–1904), an English geologist and petrographer
- Fred Rutley (1902–1947), Australian rules footballer
- Nick Rutley, Australian rules football coach
- Peter Rutley (born 1946), English former professional footballer

== See also ==
- Knight, Frank & Rutley, UK estate agency founded in London by John Knight, Howard Frank and William Rutley in 1896
- Routley
