= Ian Williams (footballer, born 1942) =

Australian rules footballer

Personal information
- Full name: Ian Williams
- Born: 26 April 1942
- Original teams: Newtown and Chilwell
- Height: 173 cm (5 ft 8 in)
- Weight: 75 kg (165 lb)

Playing career^{1}
Years	Club	Games (Goals)
1963	Geelong	2 (0)
- ^{1} Playing statistics correct to the end of 1963.

Ian Williams (born 26 April 1942) is a former Australian rules footballer who played with Geelong in the Victorian Football League (VFL).

== Football ==
On 6 July 1963 he was a member of the Geelong team that were comprehensively and unexpectedly beaten by Fitzroy, 9.13 (67) to 3.13 (31) in the 1963 Miracle Match.

== See also ==
- 1963 Miracle Match
