= Tony Polinelli =

Australian rules footballer

Personal information
- Full name: Anthony James Polinelli
- Born: 18 February 1943
- Original team: Maryborough
- Height: 170 cm (5 ft 7 in)
- Weight: 75 kg (165 lb)

Playing career^{1}
Years	Club	Games (Goals)
1961–1971	Geelong	138 (63)
- ^{1} Playing statistics correct to the end of 1971.

Anthony James Polinelli (born 18 February 1943) is a former Australian rules footballer who played with Geelong in the Victorian Football League (VFL) during the early 1960s.

== Football ==
Polinelli started his career as a rover but developed into a dashing wingman.

On 6 July 1963 he was a member of the Geelong team that were comprehensively and unexpectedly beaten by Fitzroy, 9.13 (67) to 3.13 (31) in the 1963 Miracle Match. He was a reserve in Geelong's 1963 premiership side and only appeared on the field briefly during the last quarter.

It is said that he had a pipe which he would smoke during the half time of matches.

He was shortlisted for the VFL/AFL Italian Team of the Century but didn't make the final cut.

== Athletics ==
Geelong encouraged him to train with Arthur Edgerton, a specialist sprint coach based in Geelong. Under Edgerton's guidance Polinelli won the 1966 Bendigo Gift before finishing second to Wodonga's Bill Howard in the 1966 Stawell Gift.

== See also ==
- 1963 Miracle Match
