= John Sharrock =

Australian rules footballer

Personal information
- Full name: Walter John Sharrock
- Born: 16 February 1944 (age 82)
- Original team: Tooleybuc
- Height: 185 cm (6 ft 1 in)
- Weight: 83 kg (183 lb)

Playing career^{1}
Years	Club	Games (Goals)
1963–1968	Geelong	94 (109)
- ^{1} Playing statistics correct to the end of 1968.

John Sharrock (born 16 February 1944) is a former Australian rules footballer who played with Geelong in the VFL during the 1960s.

== Football ==
Sharrock played most of his career as a half forward flanker and was a premiership player in 1963, his first season at Geelong. On 6 July 1963 he was a member of the Geelong team that were comprehensively and unexpectedly beaten by Fitzroy, 9.13 (67) to 3.13 (31) in the 1963 Miracle Match.

Due to an injury to Roy West, he spent the first half of 1966 playing at fullback before moving to centre-half forward for the second half of the season. He had his best season, finishing third in the Brownlow Medal count.

In 1968 he suffered a career ending knee injury during an Inter-League game and despite having represented Victoria at interstate football earlier in the season it would be his last year in the game.

== Life membership ==
John was awarded a Life Membership with Geelong Football Club in 2012.

== See also ==
- 1963 Miracle Match
