= Terry Callan =

Australian rules footballer (1938–2025)

Personal information
- Born: 30 August 1938
- Died: 10 June 2025 (aged 86)
- Original teams: Geelong Amateurs, Old Xaverians
- Height: 178 cm (5 ft 10 in)
- Weight: 73 kg (161 lb)
- Position: Back pocket

Playing career
Years	Club	Games (Goals)
1960–1964	Geelong	62 (5)

Terry Callan (30 August 1938 – 10 June 2025) was an Australian rules footballer who played with Geelong in the Victorian Football League (VFL).

Callan, a back pocket, played his early football with Geelong Amateurs and Old Xaverians. After making seven appearances in his debut season, Callan played 17 games for Geelong in 1961. He also represented Victoria at interstate football in 1961.

He was a regular fixture in the side again in 1962 and played in Geelong's drawn preliminary final against Carlton and preliminary final replay, which they lost.

Callan appeared in the opening 17 rounds of the 1963 VFL season. On 6 July 1963, he was a member of the Geelong team that were comprehensively and unexpectedly beaten by Fitzroy, 9.13 (67) to 3.13 (31) in the 1963 Miracle Match. A knee injury kept him out of the finals series and cost him a place in Geelong's sixth premiership team.

After having an operation on his knee to remove the strained cartilage, he returned to the side in 1964 and played three games, but continued to be troubled by his knee.

Callan was the father of former Geelong and Western Bulldogs player Tim Callan.

Callan died in Geelong on 10 June 2025, at the age of 86.

== See also ==
- 1963 Miracle Match
