= 1962 Brownlow Medal =

- Winner: Alistair Lord (Geelong); 28 votes

Television/radio coverage
- Network: Seven Network

The 1962 Brownlow Medal was the 35th year the award was presented to the player adjudged the fairest and best player during the Victorian Football League (VFL) home and away season. Alistair Lord of the Geelong Football Club won the medal by polling twenty-eight votes during the 1962 VFL season.

== Leading votegetters ==
	Player	Votes
1st	Alistair Lord (Geelong)	28
=2nd	Ken Fraser (Essendon)	19
=2nd	Kevin Murray (Fitzroy)	19
=2nd	Ron Branton (Richmond)	19
5th	John Schultz (Footscray)	15
=6th	Brian Gray (Collingwood)	13
=6th	Ron Harvey (Fitzroy)	13
=6th	Bob Skilton (South Melbourne)	13
=6th	Verdun Howell (St Kilda)	13
10th	Hassa Mann (Melbourne)	11
