= Ian McCrae =

Ian McCrae may refer to:

- Ian McCrae (Australian footballer) (born 1943), Australian rules footballer
- Ian McCrae (rugby union) (1941–2026), Scottish rugby union player

== See also ==
- Ian MacRae (born 1943), New Zealand rugby union player
- Ian McCrea (born 1976), Unionist politician from Northern Ireland
