= Garry Hamer =

Australian rules footballer

Personal information
- Born: 13 February 1943 (age 83)
- Original team: Lemnos
- Height: 185 cm (6 ft 1 in)
- Weight: 84 kg (185 lb)
- Position: Half forward

Playing career^{1}
Years	Club	Games (Goals)
1961–1965	Geelong	50 (26)
- ^{1} Playing statistics correct to the end of 1965.

Garry Hamer (born 13 February 1943) is a former Australian rules footballer who played with Geelong in the Victorian Football League (VFL).

== Football ==
=== Geelong (VFL) ===
Hamer was a half forward, defender and ruckman, recruited to Geelong from Lemnos, a Shepparton-based club.

He made his debut in the opening round of the 1961 VFL season against Collingwood, one of eight appearances he would make that year. (Note: Doug Wade, who would go on and kick 1057 league goals, also debuted) In 1962 he was one of three Geelong players to appear in all 21 games. This included both the drawn preliminary final against Carlton and the controversial five-point loss in the replay a week later. (Note: In the dying seconds a mark was taken by Wade in front of the goals but a free kick was paid to Carlton defender Peter Barry for a push in the back)

On 6 July 1963 he was a member of the Geelong team that were comprehensively and unexpectedly beaten by Fitzroy, 9.13 (67) to 3.13 (31) in the 1963 Miracle Match. He played eight games in 1963 and didn't feature in Geelong's premiership team, but did play in the Geelong reserves grand final win. The following year he again won a premiership with the reserves, after making only five appearances in the seniors.

He brought up his 50th league game in the penultimate round of the 1965 home and away season. (Note: By playing 50 games, Hamer qualified for the VFL provident fund) At the end of the year, at the age of just 22, Hamer was granted a clearance to join Wimmera Football League side Horsham as playing coach.

=== Coaching career ===
From 1966 to 1970, Hamer coached a strong Horsham side, which made the finals each year. In his first season, he finished second in the Toohey Medal and led Horsham to the grand final, which they lost to Nhill, the game decided off the last kick. He then led Horsham to back to back premierships in 1967 and 1968. After leaving Horsham he played with Geelong West, then in 1972 joined Barwon Heads and was best on ground for the club in that year's grand final win.

He was considered one of the favorites to fill the vacant position of Geelong senior coach for the 1976 VFL season, having just steered the reserves team to the 1975 premiership, his sixth since he began coaching. The job however went to Rodney Olsson and Hamer remained at the club as an assistant coach in 1976, before joining Barwon. He was coach of Geelong West in the 1982 VFA season.

== Cricket ==
Hamer also played 15 first eleven games for the Richmond Cricket Club in Victorian district cricket, as a fast bowler between 1963/64 and 1965/66.

In the 1963/64 summer, Hamer was chosen to represent a Victorian Country XI, against the touring South Africans at Kardinia Park. He took 3/50 and had Eddie Barlow as one of his wickets, bowled for a duck. When the Marylebone Cricket Club (MCC) came to Horsham in 1970/71, Hamer again represented Victoria Country and dismissed Colin Cowdrey leg before wicket for a duck.

== See also ==
- 1963 Miracle Match
