= Fred Wooller =

Australian rules footballer

Personal information
- Full name: Frederick Arnold Wooller
- Born: 21 October 1937 (age 89)
- Original team: Maddingley (BMMDFA)
- Height: 187 cm (6 ft 2 in)
- Weight: 85 kg (187 lb)

Playing career^{1}
Years	Club	Games (Goals)
1956–1964	Geelong	132 (225)
- ^{1} Playing statistics correct to the end of 1964.

Career highlights
- Geelong premiership captain 1963; Geelong leading goalkicker 1957, 1959, 1960; Carji Greeves Medal 1960; Geelong captain 1963–1964

Frederick Arnold Wooller (born 21 October 1937) is a former Australian rules footballer who played with Geelong in the VFL. Fred Wooller is the oldest living VFL/AFL Captain and presented the inaugural Ron Barassi Medal to the winning captain in the 2024 AFL Grand Final.

== Family ==
He married Patricia Aileen Hope in 1961.

== Football ==
=== Maddingley (BMMDFA) ===
He was recruited from Maddingley Football Club in the Bacchus Marsh and Melton District Football Association.

=== Geelong (VFL) ===
Wooller started his career as a full forward and topped Geelong's goalkicking with 56 goals in 1957, his tally being the equal second highest in the league for that season. He was rewarded with selection in the interstate carnival where he represented Victoria.

He was the Geelong's leading goalkicker again in 1959 as well as in 1960, where he played at centre half forward and won the Carji Greeves Medal for the club's best and fairest.

On 6 July 1963 he was a member of the Geelong team that were comprehensively and unexpectedly beaten by Fitzroy, 9.13 (67) to 3.13 (31) in the 1963 Miracle Match.

In 1963 he became club captain and led his side into the grand final. He kicked 3 goals and helped Geelong win their 6th premiership.

=== Penguin (NWFU) ===
He was captain-coach of the Penguin Football Club in Tasmania's North West Football Union (NWFU) for four seasons (1965-1968). He was the NWFU's leading goal-kicker in 1966 (61 goals).

=== Kyabram (GVFL) ===
In 1969 and 1970 he was captain-coach of the Kyabram Football Club in the Goulburn Valley Football League (GVFL)

== See also ==
- 1963 Miracle Match
