= Bill Miller (Australian footballer) =

Australian rules footballer

Personal information
- Full name: William Miller
- Born: 4 January 1936
- Died: 27 June 1986 (aged 50)
- Original team: Hawthorn reserves
- Height: 180 cm (5 ft 11 in)
- Weight: 73 kg (161 lb)

Playing career^{1}
Years	Club	Games (Goals)
1960–1963	Geelong	37 (19)
- ^{1} Playing statistics correct to the end of 1963.

Bill Miller (4 January 1936 – 27 June 1986) was an Australian rules footballer who played with Geelong in the Victorian Football League (VFL).

On 6 July 1963 he was a member of the Geelong team that were comprehensively and unexpectedly beaten by Fitzroy, 9.13 (67) to 3.13 (31) in the 1963 Miracle Match.

== See also ==
- 1963 Miracle Match
