= Brian Brushfield =

Australian rules footballer

Personal information
- Full name: Brian Brushfield
- Born: 25 December 1943 (age 82)
- Original team: Xavier College
- Height: 185 cm (6 ft 1 in)
- Weight: 76 kg (168 lb)

Playing career^{1}
Years	Club	Games (Goals)
1962–1965	Geelong (VFL)	15 (3)
1966–1968	Geelong West (VFA)	60 (?)

Coaching career
Years	Club	Games (W–L–D)
1967–1968	Geelong West (VFA)	41 (30–11–0)
- ^{1} Playing statistics correct to the end of 1968.

Brian Brushfield (born 25 December 1943) is a former Australian rules footballer who played with Geelong in the Victorian Football League (VFL). He was also a football commentator for some years, at Geelong radio station K-Rock.

== VFL career ==
Brushfield, a half-forward, is the nephew of former Geelong player Nick Brushfield.

Recruited from Xavier College, Brushfield started out at Geelong as an 18-year-old in the 1962 VFL season, where he made two league appearances.

He played a further six games in 1963, a premiership year, but didn't feature in the finals. On 6 July 1963 he was a member of the Geelong team that were comprehensively and unexpectedly beaten by Fitzroy, 9.13 (67) to 3.13 (31) in the 1963 Miracle Match.

Over the next two years, Brushfield made seven more league appearances, then left for the Victorian Football Association (VFA).

He had played in two reserves premierships for Geelong, in 1963 and 1964.

== Geelong West ==
Brushfield played for VFA club Geelong West from 1966 to 1968.

He was made captain-coach in 1967 and took Geelong West to the Division 2 grand final, which they lost to Oakleigh by 13 points.

In 1968, at the age of just 24, Brushfield led Geelong West to a premiership, with a grand final win over Williamstown.
