= Ian Scott (Australian footballer) =

Australian rules footballer

Personal information
- Born: 7 March 1940 (age 86)
- Original team: Terang
- Height: 180 cm (5 ft 11 in)
- Weight: 84 kg (185 lb)

Playing career^{1}
Years	Club	Games (Goals)
1963–1965	Geelong	36 (0)
- ^{1} Playing statistics correct to the end of 1965.

Ian Scott (born 7 March 1940) is a former Australian rules footballer who played with Geelong in the VFL during the 1960s.

Scott played in the back pocket for Geelong and was a premiership player in his first season at the club. Three of his first four games, including the 1963 VFL Grand Final, were played against Hawthorn.

In late 1965 Scott injured his right knee and missed the last six games of the season. He re-injured the knee in March 1966 and did not play for Geelong again.
