= Roy West (footballer) =

Australian rules footballer

Personal information
- Full name: Roy Mervyn West
- Born: 31 March 1941
- Died: 19 November 2011 (aged 70); Ballarat, Victoria
- Original teams: Great Western, Stawell
- Height: 185 cm (6 ft 1 in)
- Weight: 81 kg (179 lb)
- Position: Fullback

Playing career^{1}
| Years | Club | Games (Goals) |
| 1961–64; 1966–67 | Geelong | 108 (1) |

Representative team honours^{2}
| Years | Team | Games (Goals) |
| 1962–1963 | Victoria | 2 (0) |
- ^{1} Playing statistics correct to the end of 1967.^{2} Representative statistics correct as of 1963.

Career highlights
- VFL premiership player (1963); Carji Greeves Medal (1961)

Roy Mervyn West (31 March 1941 – 19 November 2011) was an Australian rules footballer for the Geelong Football Club in the Victorian Football League (VFL) during the 1960s.

West played in Stawell's Wimmera Football League grand final loss to Horsham in 1960, then West was a fullback and won the 1961 Carji Greeves Medal for Geelong's best and fairest player.

On 6 July 1963 he was a member of the Geelong team that were comprehensively and unexpectedly beaten by Fitzroy, 9.13 (67) to 3.13 (31) in the 1963 Miracle Match. He was a premiership player in 1963 and represented Victoria at interstate football.

West died in a Ballarat hospital on 19 November 2011, aged 70, four years after being diagnosed with lung cancer.

Roys son, Troy West, is a notable supporter of the Geelong football club, attending most games and donning the 'Catman' Persona, dressing up entirely in the clubs colours.

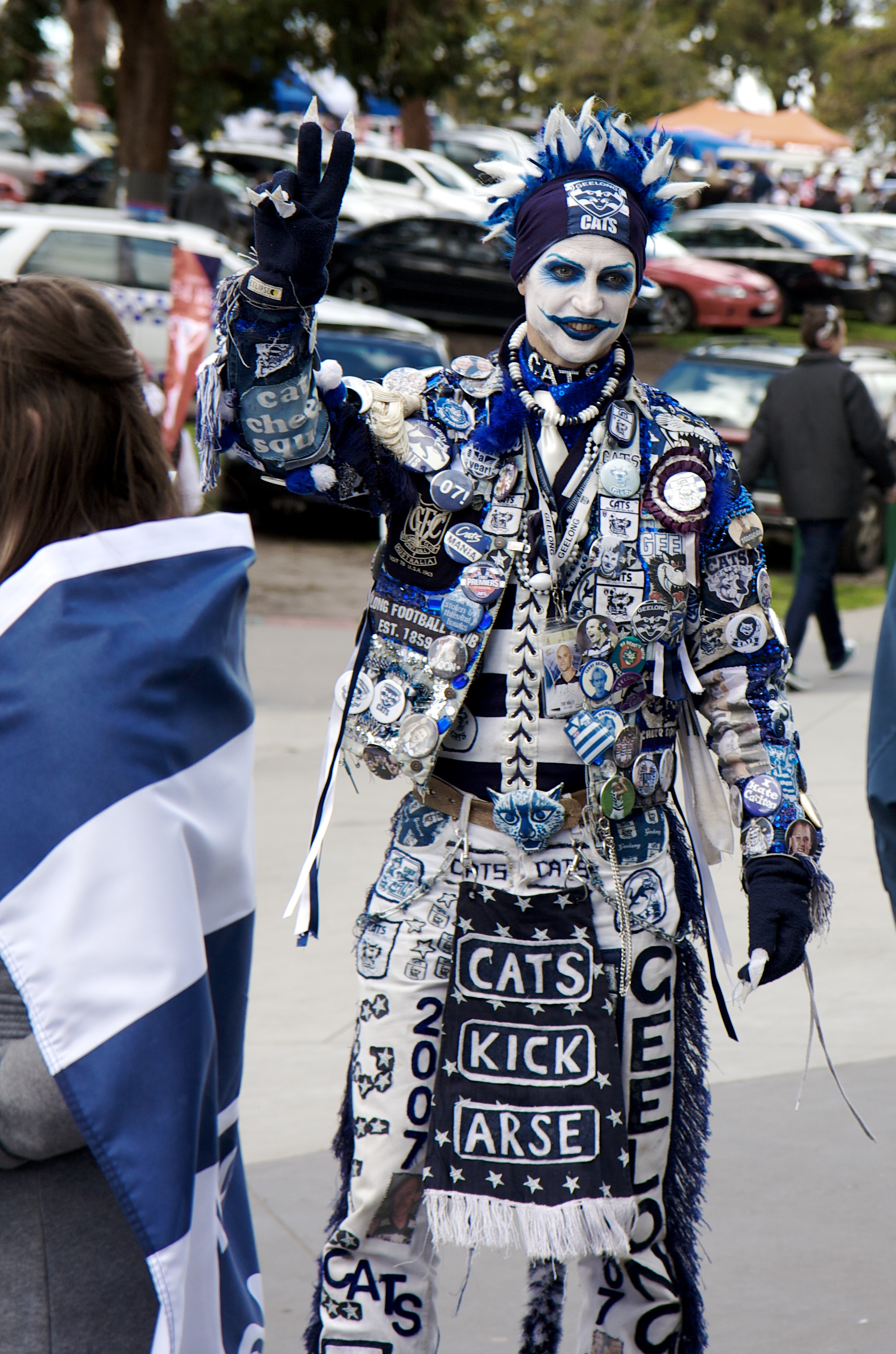
Troy West as 'Catman'

== See also ==
- 1963 Miracle Match
