= Nick Brushfield =

Australian rules footballer

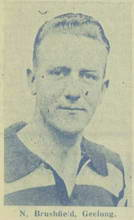

Personal information
- Full name: Nicholas Peter Brushfield
- Born: 26 July 1906; Geelong, Victoria
- Died: 13 November 1993 (aged 87)
- Original team: St Mary's
- Height: 180 cm (5 ft 11 in)
- Weight: 73 kg (161 lb)

Playing career^{1}
Years	Club	Games (Goals)
1923–1927	Geelong	41 (10)
- ^{1} Playing statistics correct to the end of 1927.

Nicholas Peter Brushfield (26 July 1906 – 13 November 1993) was an Australian rules footballer who played with Geelong in the Victorian Football League (VFL).

== Geelong ==
Brushfield was only 16 years of age when he came from St Mary's and debuted for Geelong in the 1923 VFL season. He played 16 games for Geelong in 1925, a premiership year, only to miss the grand final when he sprained a leg the day before and was withdrawn from the side. During the 1925 season he represented Victoria against Bendigo and New South Wales. He retired from football on the advice of his doctor halfway through Geelong's 1926 premiership defence, but returned in 1927 to make five appearances.

== Coaching ==
In the 1930s he had success as coach of the Geelong Amateurs in the Victorian Amateur Football Association, with premierships in 1931 and 1933.

== Family ==
His nephew, Brian Brushfield, played for Geelong in the 1960s. He is also related to Geelong player Tom Hawkins.
