= John Bahen =

Australian rules footballer

Personal information
- Born: 4 October 1943
- Died: 2 May 2017 (aged 73)
- Original teams: CBC Parade / Assumption College

Playing career^{1}
Years	Club	Games (Goals)
1962–1967	Fitzroy	67 (35)
- ^{1} Playing statistics correct to the end of 1967.

John Bahen (4 October 1943 – 2 May 2017) was an Australian rules footballer for the Fitzroy Football Club in the Victorian Football League (VFL).

== Football ==
=== Fitzroy (VFL) ===
He played 67 senior games for Fitzroy between 1962 and 1967.

On 6 July 1963, playing in the centre, he was a member of the young and inexperienced Fitzroy team that comprehensively and unexpectedly defeated Geelong, 9.13 (67) to 3.13 (31) in the 1963 Miracle Match.

=== Port Melbourne (VFA) ===
He played 13 senior matched for Port Melbourne over two seasons (1968-1969).

== After football ==
In retirement he went on to own a number of city hotels including The Greyhound Hotel, The Imperial and The Station Hotel NM.

== Death ==
Bahen died on 2 May 2017, aged 73.

== See also ==
- 1963 Miracle Match
