= Ken Goodland =

Australian rules footballer

Personal information
- Full name: Kenneth Gilmore John Goodland
- Born: 3 August 1940
- Died: 26 March 1983 (aged 42)
- Original team: Swan Hill
- Height: 189 cm (6 ft 2 in)
- Weight: 89 kg (196 lb)

Playing career^{1}
Years	Club	Games (Goals)
1959–1965	Geelong	54 (7)
- ^{1} Playing statistics correct to the end of 1965.

Kenneth Gilmore John Goodland (3 August 1940 – 26 March 1983) was an Australian rules footballer who played with Geelong in the VFL during the early 1960s.

== Football ==
Used mostly as a ruckman or half back, Goodland came off the bench in Geelong's 1963 premiership side.

On 6 July 1963 he was a member of the Geelong team that were comprehensively and unexpectedly beaten by Fitzroy, 9.13 (67) to 3.13 (31) in the 1963 Miracle Match.

He had career riddled with injuries, including breaking his leg in the opening game of the 1964 season.

== See also ==
- 1963 Miracle Match
