= Colin Sleep =

Australian rules footballer

Personal information
- Full name: Colin Sleep
- Born: 8 October 1944 (age 82)
- Original team: Horsham
- Height: 174 cm (5 ft 9 in)
- Weight: 65 kg (143 lb)
- Position: Midfielder

Playing career^{1}
Years	Club	Games (Goals)
1962–64	Fitzroy	17 (5)
- ^{1} Playing statistics correct to the end of 1964.

Colin Sleep (born 8 October 1944) is a former Australian rules footballer who played with Fitzroy in the Victorian Football League (VFL) during the 1960s.

== Football ==
=== Fitzroy (VFL) ===
From Horsham originally, Sleep played his football mostly as a rover and centreman.

He played five times for Fitzroy in 1962, his first season, followed by six in both 1963 and 1964. Four of his five career goals came in a match against North Melbourne at Brunswick Street in his final year.

On 6 July 1963, playing on the wing, he was a member of the young and inexperienced Fitzroy team that comprehensively and unexpectedly defeated Geelong, 9.13 (67) to 3.13 (31) in the 1963 Miracle Match.

=== Northcote (VFA) ===
While playing for Northcote in the Victorian Football Association, Sleep represented the Association in the 1966 Hobart Carnival.

In 1967, he tied on votes for the Division 2 Best and Fairest (later known as the Field Medal) but lost on countback; he was later retrospectively made joint winner of the award.

== See also ==
- 1963 Miracle Match
