= Tony Hirst (footballer) =

Australian rules footballer

Personal information
- Full name: Tony Hirst
- Born: 14 June 1945 (age 81)
- Height: 183 cm (6 ft 0 in)
- Weight: 79.5 kg (175 lb)

Playing career^{1}
Years	Club	Games (Goals)
1963–65	Fitzroy	19 (3)
1966	Melbourne	2 (0)
Total		21 (3)
- ^{1} Playing statistics correct to the end of 1966.

Tony Hirst (born 14 June 1945) is a former Australian rules footballer who played with Fitzroy and Melbourne in the Victorian Football League (VFL).

== Football ==
On 6 July 1963, playing on the half-forward flank, and kicking one goal, he was a member of the young and inexperienced Fitzroy team that comprehensively and unexpectedly defeated Geelong, 9.13 (67) to 3.13 (31) in the 1963 Miracle Match.

== See also ==
- 1963 Miracle Match
