= David Sykes (footballer) =

Australian rules footballer

Personal information
- Full name: David Arthur Sykes
- Born: 4 October 1942
- Died: 11 May 2023 (aged 80)
- Original team: Commonwealth Bank
- Height: 191 cm (6 ft 3 in)
- Weight: 86 kg (190 lb)
- Position: Ruck

Playing career^{1}
Years	Club	Games (Goals)
1961–63, 1967–68	Fitzroy	34 (37)
- ^{1} Playing statistics correct to the end of 1968.

David Arthur Sykes (4 October 1942 – 11 May 2023) was an Australian rules footballer who played with Fitzroy in the Victorian Football League (VFL).

== Footballer ==
Sykes, who was recruited out of the Victorian Amateur Football Association, played as a forward and ruckman for Fitzroy. He had two stints at the club and in between spent some time as captain-coach of Cobden, in the Hampden Football League.

On 6 July 1963, playing at Centre half-back, he was a member of the young and inexperienced Fitzroy team that comprehensively and unexpectedly defeated Geelong, 9.13 (67) to 3.13 (31) in the 1963 Miracle Match.

Sykes, North Albury won the 1964 Ovens & Murray Football League best & fairest award, the Morris Medal with Jim Sandral, Corowa, both on 22 votes.

He was later both a state and league coach in Sydney. He was captain-coach of the Blood Stained Newtown Angels in 1970/71.

== See also ==
- 1963 Miracle Match
