= John Hayes (footballer, born 1939) =

Australian rules footballer

Personal information
- Full name: John Hayes
- Born: 6 August 1939 (age 87)
- Original team: Warracknabeal
- Height: 177 cm (5 ft 10 in)
- Weight: 75 kg (165 lb)
- Position: Defender

Playing career^{1}
Years	Club	Games (Goals)
1961–1966	Fitzroy	94 (21)
- ^{1} Playing statistics correct to the end of 1966.

John Hayes (born 6 August 1939) is a former Australian rules footballer who played with Fitzroy in the Victorian Football League (VFL).

== Football ==
=== Fitzroy (VFL) ===
A defender, Hayes came to Fitzroy from Warracknabeal. Hayes captained Fitzroy for most of the 1966 VFL season, replacing Ralph Rogerson, who retired five rounds into the year.

On 6 July 1963, playing as first rover, he was a member of the young and inexperienced Fitzroy team that comprehensively and unexpectedly defeated Geelong, 9.13 (67) to 3.13 (31) in the 1963 Miracle Match.

=== Yarrawonga ===
He then moved to Yarrawonga, a club which he would captain-coach.

== See also ==
- 1963 Miracle Match
