= Brian Pert =

Australian rules footballer

Personal information
- Full name: Brian Thomas Pert
- Born: 28 January 1936 (age 90)
- Original team: Preston Scouts
- Height: 182 cm (6 ft 0 in)
- Weight: 76 kg (168 lb)

Playing career^{1}
Years	Club	Games (Goals)
1954–1965	Fitzroy	125 (18)
- ^{1} Playing statistics correct to the end of 1965.

Brian Thomas Pert (born 28 January 1936) is a former Australian rules footballer who played for Fitzroy in the VFL.

== Family ==
The son of Thomas Arthur Pert (1905–1961), and Grace Dorothy Pert (1905–1994), née Condick, Brian Thomas Pert was born on 28 January 1936.

He married Valerie Thelma Ballantyne (1938-) in 1960.

His son Gary was a best and fairest winner with Fitzroy.

== Football ==
Cleared from Preston Scouts to Fitzroy in April 1953, Pert usually played at half-back or as a wingman. He missed many games due to injury and despite spending 12 seasons with Fitzroy he managed to play only 125 games.

=== Saturday, 6 July 1963 ===
On 6 July 1963, playing on the half-back flank, he was a member of the young and inexperienced Fitzroy team that comprehensively and unexpectedly defeated Geelong, 9.13 (67) to 3.13 (31) in the 1963 Miracle Match. Pert was declared the "best on ground" for his outstanding performance in the match.

== See also ==
- 1963 Miracle Match
