= Hugh Routley =

Australian rules footballer (1940–2020)

Personal information
- Full name: Hugh Francis Routley
- Born: 19 June 1940
- Died: 12 September 2020 (aged 80); Geelong, Victoria
- Original team: Eaglehawk
- Height: 173 cm (5 ft 8 in)
- Weight: 73 kg (161 lb)

Playing career^{1}
Years	Club	Games (Goals)
1959–1964	Geelong	27 (0)
- ^{1} Playing statistics correct to the end of 1964.

Hugh Francis Routley (19 June 1940 – 12 September 2020) was an Australian rules footballer who played with Geelong in the VFL.

Routley debuted in 1959 and managed to play just 8 games coming into the 1963 season.

On 6 July 1963 he was a member of the Geelong team that were comprehensively and unexpectedly beaten by Fitzroy, 9.13 (67) to 3.13 (31) in the 1963 Miracle Match.

Playing on the wing, Routley became a regular in the side during 1963 and was a member of their premiership side.

== See also ==
- 1963 Miracle Match

1963 VFL grand final
