= Damien Keeping =

Australian rules football coach (born 1972)

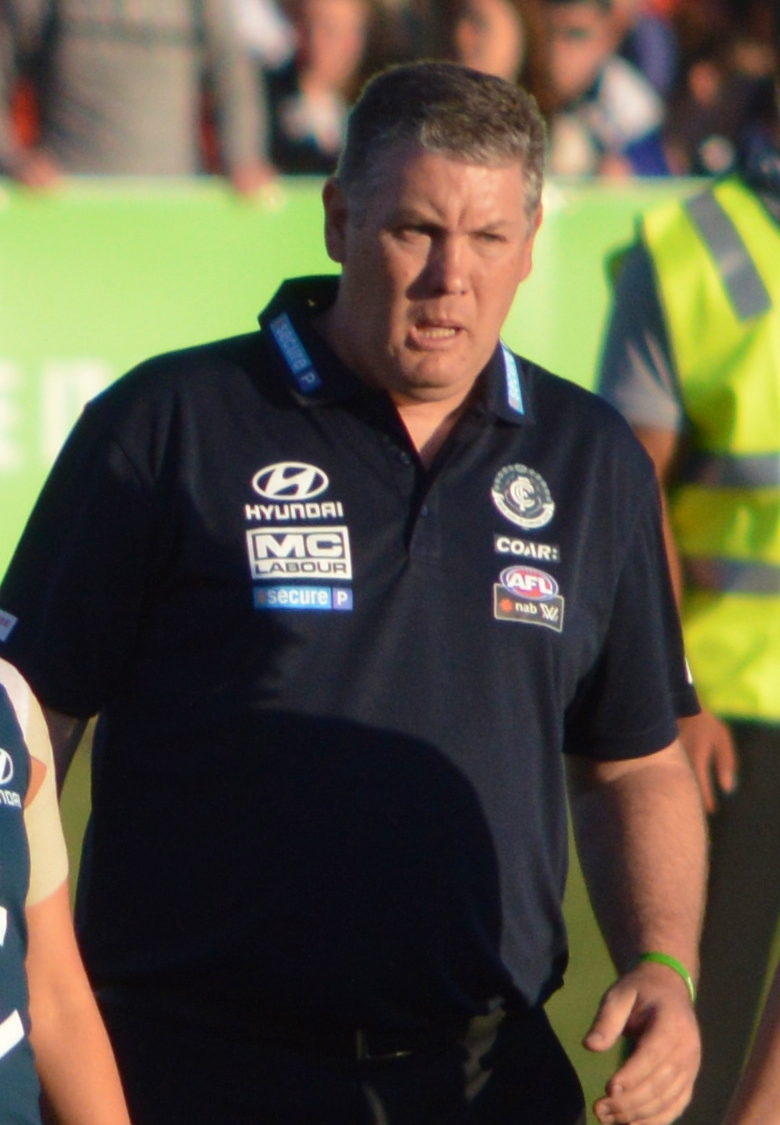
- Keeping in February 2017

Personal information
- Born: 25 May 1972 (age 54)

Coaching career^{3}
Years	Club	Games (W–L–D)
2017–2018	Carlton (W)	12 (4–7–1)
Total		12 (4–7–1)
- ^{3} Coaching statistics correct as of 2018.

Damien Keeping (born 25 May 1972) is an Australian rules football coach who served as the head coach of the Carlton Football Club in its first two seasons in the AFL Women's competition (AFLW), from 2017 to 2018.

== Coaching career ==
=== Beginnings ===
After coaching junior boys football at Gisborne Rookies at local level Keeping took up a role as assistant coach with the Calder Cannons in the TAC Cup. From there he made his first foray into women's football, moving on to coach the Victorian Metro Youth Girls side as an assistant coach. He later also served at the VWFL Women's Academy.

In 2016 Keeping worked as the head coach of the Western Bulldogs representative side in that year's women's exhibition series.

=== AFL Women's ===
Keeping was appointed as the inaugural head coach of Carlton's AFL Women's side in June 2016.

He coached the side to three wins and a draw from seven matches in the league's inaugural season in 2017.

After coaching the club to victory in its first match of the 2018 season, it was announced that Keeping had been admitted to hospital with an undisclosed illness. He was replaced in rounds 2 and 3 by assistant coach Nick Rutley, before Keeping returned to coaching in round 4. He failed to secure a win in the club's final four matches of the season, instead coaching Carlton to a wooden spoon finish with two wins. Keeping and the club parted ways by mutual agreement on 20 March, just two days after the home and away season's end. He had coached the club to 12 matches across his two seasons.

== Coaching statistics ==
Statistics are correct to the end of 2018

Legend
W	Wins	L	Losses	D	Draws	W%	Winning percentage	LP	Ladder position	LT	League teams

Season	Team	Games	W	L	D	W %	LP	LT
2017	Carlton	7	3	3	1	43%	4	8
2018	Carlton	5	1	4	0	20%	8	8
Career totals		12	4	7	1	33%		
