= Peter Walker (footballer) =

Australian rules footballer

Personal information
- Born: 12 June 1942
- Died: 8 July 2010 (aged 68)
- Original team: Beeac
- Height: 183 cm (6 ft 0 in)
- Weight: 76 kg (168 lb)

Playing career^{1}
Years	Club	Games (Goals)
1960–1971	Geelong	159 (1)
- ^{1} Playing statistics correct to the end of 1971.

Peter Walker (12 June 1942 – 8 July 2010) was an Australian rules footballer who played with Geelong in the Victorian Football League (VFL) during the 1960s.

== Family ==
His grandson Josh Walker played for Geelong, Brisbane Lions and North Melbourne.

== Football ==
A centre-half back who was originally from Beeac, Walker won the Carji Greeves Medal for Geelong's best and fairest player in 1965 and represented Victoria in nine interstate matches.

On 6 July 1963 he was a member of the Geelong team that were comprehensively and unexpectedly beaten by Fitzroy, 9.13 (67) to 3.13 (31) in the 1963 Miracle Match.

== See also ==
- 1963 Miracle Match
