= Gary Pert =

Australian rules footballer, (born 1965)

Personal information
- Full name: Gary James Pert
- Born: 28 May 1965 (age 61)
- Original team: Bulleen
- Height: 189 cm (6 ft 2 in)
- Weight: 97 kg (214 lb)
- Position: Full back

Playing career^{1}
Years	Club	Games (Goals)
1982–1990	Fitzroy	163 (42)
1991–1995	Collingwood	70 (4)
Total		233 (46)

Representative team honours
Years	Team	Games (Goals)
	Victoria	6
- ^{1} Playing statistics correct to the end of 1995.

Career highlights
- Mitchell Medal: 1989; All-Australian team: 1985; Fitzroy team of the century (half back flank)

Gary Pert (born 28 May 1965) is a former Australian rules footballer who represented Fitzroy and Collingwood in the Australian Football League (AFL). Tall, well-built and strong in the air, Pert played over 200 league games, despite suffering two serious knee injuries in the prime years of his career. Early in one season, Pert suffered a bizarre injury when he went to his girlfriend's house for dinner and got a biscuit stuck in his oesophagus. The blockage remained overnight and so the following day he underwent an oesophagoscopy under general anaesthetic. He recovered in time for the Round 5 game against Richmond. He returned in 1989, winning Fitzroy's best and fairest.

== Fitzroy career ==
The son of Brian Pert, a former Fitzroy utility player, Pert was educated at Templestowe High School.

Besides representing Bulleen in junior football, Pert also played for the Victorian Football League (VFL) schoolboys team in Ireland in 1981. He was recruited to Fitzroy, as Bulleen was in Fitzroy's recruiting zone, and made his senior debut in Round 4 of the 1982 season at only 16 years of age. Also making his debut was Paul Roos, with whom Pert formed a great partnership for Fitzroy through the 1980s.

He played State of Origin for Victoria in 1984 at the age of just 18, and was a champion full-back for the Lions (who could be switched to the forward line). In 1985 he won All-Australian selection.

Pert missed much of the first half of the 1987 VFL season due to a knee injury, but was playing again by the end of the season. Prior to the start of the 1988 VFL season, Paul Roos was named captain of Fitzroy, and Pert was chosen as his deputy. On the strong bond between Roos and Pert, David Parkin, who was coach of Fitzroy at the time, said:

They're inseparable in everything they do... On the field, from the time the ball leaves Pert and goes to Roos, there is an understanding there. I don't think I've seen such an understanding relationship between two players... It is remarkable

At the end of the 1990 AFL season, Pert suffered another knee injury that would rule him out of play for the whole year. The Lions let Pert go, having played 163 games with 42 goals between 1982 and 1990. The Collingwood Football Club subsequently picked him up in the 1990 AFL draft.

== Collingwood career ==
After missing the entire 1991 AFL season with a knee injury that he carried over from Fitzroy, Pert gave Collingwood loyal service over 70 games in four seasons, continuing to take on and match the best full forwards in the League. Soon after his retirement, his surname became rhyming slang, as evidenced in the popular Australian phrase, "How dare you! You've only gone and bloody well Gary Pert my feelings again!". Pert’s one career highlight came when he was used a human step ladder by Gary Ablett Senior when he took mark of the century.

== Post-AFL career ==
After retiring, Pert worked as a chief executive officer (CEO) for various high-profile organizations in Melbourne. He was head of Austereo before taking up a position at the Nine Network TV station in December 2006. But that job did not last long.

In May 2007, he replaced Greg Swann as CEO of Collingwood. On 24 July 2017, Pert resigned from his position as CEO of the club.

In June 2018, Pert returned to the AFL industry after being appointed as CEO of the Melbourne Football Club.
