= Ron Fry =

Australian rules footballer

Personal information
- Full name: Ron Fry
- Born: 4 May 1937
- Died: 24 January 1985 (aged 47)
- Original team: Penguin
- Height: 187 cm (6 ft 2 in)
- Weight: 86 kg (190 lb)
- Position: Ruck

Playing career^{1}
Years	Club	Games (Goals)
1963–67	Fitzroy	46 (7)
- ^{1} Playing statistics correct to the end of 1967.

Ron Fry (4 May 1937 – 24 January 1985) was an Australian rules footballer who played with Fitzroy in the Victorian Football League (VFL).

== Saturday, 6 July 1963 ==
On 6 July 1963, playing in the first ruck, he was a member of the young and inexperienced Fitzroy team that comprehensively and unexpectedly defeated Geelong, 9.13 (67) to 3.13 (31) in the 1963 Miracle Match.

== See also ==
- 1963 Miracle Match
