= Eric Nicholls =

Australian rules footballer

Personal information
- Full name: Eric Nicholls
- Born: 15 October 1939 (age 87)
- Original team: East Geelong
- Height: 180 cm (5 ft 11 in)
- Weight: 78 kg (172 lb)
- Position: Defender

Playing career^{1}
Years	Club	Games (Goals)
1956–1963	Geelong	58 (0)
- ^{1} Playing statistics correct to the end of 1963.

Eric Nicholls (born 15 October 1939) is a former Australian rules footballer who played with Geelong in the Victorian Football League (VFL).

== Career ==
Nicholls, who captained the Victorian schoolboys in interstate football, came to the VFL from East Geelong in 1956. He was a defender, used mostly as a half-back flanker and occasionally at full-back. His debut in the round 10 loss to Footscray at Western Oval, at the age of 16 and 245 days, made him the youngest player to debut for Geelong since Leo Tasker in 1917. It would be his only senior appearance in 1956 and he didn't get an extended run in the team until 1961, when he played in all 18 games. In 1962 he suffered a broken collarbone and later a thigh injury, which restricted his appearances, but he did feature in Geelong's drawn preliminary final against Carlton, before missing the replay. He played six league games in 1963, the last in round 14, then ended the year with a premiership in the reserves. It was his final season at Geelong before he left to captain-coach Geelong West in the Victorian Football Association (VFA).

In 1964, his first season as coach, Nicholls won a best and fairest and led Geelong West to the VFA 2nd Division premiership, with an upset 21 point win over Sunshine in the grand final. This came despite a poor start to the season, with losses in the opening four rounds and was the club's first VFA premiership, in what was only its second season in the competition. Promoted to the 1st Division for the 1965 VFA season, Nicholls was unable prevent Geelong West from finishing last. On an individual level he had a strong year, with an equal fifth placing in the J. J. Liston Trophy. Nicholls remained captain-coach in 1966 and in what would be his final season steered Geelong West to another 2nd Division grand final, which they lost to Oakleigh by 13 points.

== Family ==
His son, Leigh Nicholls, played Under 19s for Geelong and was a Victorian Teal Cup representative.
