= Brian Carroll (Australian footballer) =

Australian rules footballer

Personal information
- Full name: Brian Carroll
- Born: 25 March 1941 (age 85)
- Original team: Camperdown
- Height: 178 cm (5 ft 10 in)
- Weight: 80 kg (176 lb)

Playing career
Years	Club	Games (Goals)
1963	Fitzroy	10 (0)

Brian Carroll (born 25 March 1941) is a former Australian Rules footballer, who played 10 matches for Fitzroy in 1963.

== Family ==
He is the father of current Collingwood Head of academy and former Box Hill coach and former Hawthorn assistant coach Damian Carroll.

== Football ==
=== Saturday, 6 July 1963 ===
On 6 July 1963, playing in the back-pocket, he was a member of the young and inexperienced Fitzroy team that comprehensively and unexpectedly defeated Geelong, 9.13 (67) to 3.13 (31) in the 1963 Miracle Match.

== See also ==
- 1963 Miracle Match
