= Ron Nalder =

Australian rules footballer (1939–2026)

- Nalder with Hawthorn c. 1960s

Personal information
- Full name: Ronald James Nalder
- Born: 8 September 1939
- Died: 14 October 2026 (aged 87)
- Original team: Maryborough (Ballarat FL)
- Height: 178 cm (5 ft 10 in)
- Weight: 76 kg (168 lb)

Playing career^{1}
Years	Club	Games (Goals)
1959–1966	Hawthorn	121 (44)
- ^{1} Playing statistics correct to the end of 1966.

Ronald James Nalder (8 September 1939 – 14 October 2026) was an Australian rules footballer who played for the Hawthorn Football Club in the Victorian Football League (VFL).

Although mainly a centreman, Nalder also spent time across half forward and half back. He was one of Hawthorn's two reserves in their 1961 VFL premiership and also played in their losing 1963 VFL grand final.

Nalder died in October 2026, aged 87.
