= Wayne Eastman =

Australian rules footballer

Personal information
- Full name: Wayne Eastman
- Born: January 16, 1942 (age 84)
- Original team: West Preston
- Height: 173 cm (5 ft 8 in)
- Weight: 67 kg (148 lb)

Playing career^{1}
Years	Club	Games (Goals)
1961–68	Fitzroy	73 (9)
- ^{1} Playing statistics correct to the end of 1968.

Wayne Eastman (born January 16, 1942) is a former Australian rules footballer who played with Fitzroy in the Victorian Football League (VFL).

== Football ==
On 6 July 1963, playing on the wing, he was a member of the young and inexperienced Fitzroy team that comprehensively and unexpectedly defeated Geelong, 9.13 (67) to 3.13 (31) in the 1963 "Miracle Match".

== See also ==
- 1963 Miracle Match
