= Max Miers =

Australian rules footballer

Personal information
- Full name: Max Miers
- Born: 6 October 1940
- Died: 19 January 2003 (aged 62)
- Height: 185 cm (6 ft 1 in)
- Weight: 89 kg (196 lb)
- Position: Ruck

Playing career^{1}
Years	Club	Games (Goals)
1960–61	Carlton	6 (0)
1962–65	Fitzroy	40 (11)
Total		46 (11)
- ^{1} Playing statistics correct to the end of 1965.

Max Miers (6 October 1940 – 19 January 2003) was an Australian rules footballer who played with Carlton for one season and with Fitzroy for three seasons in the Victorian Football League (VFL).

== Football ==
=== Fitzroy (VFL) ===
On 6 July 1963, playing as a resting forward-pocket ruckman, and kicking one goal, he was a member of the young and inexperienced Fitzroy team that comprehensively and unexpectedly defeated Geelong, 9.13 (67) to 3.13 (31) in the 1963 Miracle Match.

== See also ==
- 1963 Miracle Match
