= Bryan Clements =

Australian rules footballer

Personal information
- Full name: Bryan Clements
- Born: 10 September 1942
- Original team: Wonthaggi Rovers
- Height: 196 cm (6 ft 5 in)
- Weight: 84 kg (185 lb)

Playing career^{1}
Years	Club	Games (Goals)
1961–64	Fitzroy	23 (6)
- ^{1} Playing statistics correct to the end of 1964.

Bryan Clements (born 10 September 1942) is a former Australian rules footballer who played with Fitzroy in the Victorian Football League (VFL).

== Football ==
On 6 July 1963, playing in the first ruck, he was a member of the young and inexperienced Fitzroy team that comprehensively and unexpectedly defeated Geelong, 9.13 (67) to 3.13 (31) in the 1963 Miracle Match.

== See also ==
- 1963 Miracle Match
