= Allen Lynch (footballer) =

Australian rules footballer (1938–2021)

Personal information
- Full name: Allen John Lynch
- Born: 30 July 1938
- Died: 6 June 2021 (aged 82)
- Original team: Launceston
- Height: 191 cm (6 ft 3 in)
- Weight: 85 kg (187 lb)
- Position: Fullback / ruck

Playing career^{1}
Years	Club	Games (Goals)
1959–1966	Fitzroy	106 (17)
- ^{1} Playing statistics correct to the end of 1966.

Allen John Lynch (30 July 1938 – 6 June 2021) was an Australian rules footballer who played for the Fitzroy Football Club in the Victorian Football League (VFL).

== Football ==
=== Saturday, 6 July 1963 ===
On 6 July 1963, playing at full-back, he was a member of the young and inexperienced Fitzroy team that comprehensively and unexpectedly defeated Geelong, 9.13 (67) to 3.13 (31) in the 1963 Miracle Match.

== See also ==
- 1963 Miracle Match
