= Kevin Coverdale =

Australian rules footballer

Personal information
- Full name: Kevin Coverdale
- Born: 31 May 1940
- Died: 4 April 1997 (aged 56)
- Original team: Bairnsdale
- Height: 188 cm (6 ft 2 in)
- Weight: 86 kg (190 lb)

Playing career^{1}
Years	Club	Games (Goals)
1963–1965	Hawthorn	50 (33)
- ^{1} Playing statistics correct to the end of 1965.

Kevin Coverdale (31 May 1940 – 4 April 1997) was an Australian rules footballer who played with Hawthorn in the Victorian Football League (VFL).

Coverdale first joined Hawthorn in 1959 and played VFL reserves football before returning to his home town of Bairnsdale due to work commitments. He also had the misfortune of being injured in two separate car accidents during his early career. Nevertheless, he won the La Trobe Valley Football League's "Best and Fairest" award in 1961, following a strong season with Bairnsdale.

He was cleared to Hawthorn for the 1963 season and would kick 21 goals from his 20 senior games that year. A centre half forward, he appeared for Hawthorn in the 1963 VFL Grand Final, which they lost. After playing two more seasons he left Melbourne and rejoined Bairnsdale, which he would captain.

He was awarded 10 Brownlow Medal votes in his VFL career.
