= Barry Fitzgerald (footballer) =

Australian rules footballer

Personal information
- Born: 1 October 1938; Adelaide, South Australia
- Original team: Sydney Naval Depot

Playing career
Years	Club	Games (Goals)
1963–1965	Fitzroy	35 (4)

Barry Fitzgerald (born 1 October 1938) is a former Australian rules footballer who played with Fitzroy in the VFL.

On 6 July 1963, he was 19th man for the young and inexperienced Fitzroy team that comprehensively and unexpectedly defeated Geelong, 9.13 (67) to 3.13 (31) in the 1963 Miracle Match.

== See also ==
- 1963 Miracle Match
