= John Yeates =

Australian rules footballer

Personal information
- Born: 30 August 1938 (age 88)
- Original team: West Gambier
- Height: 196 cm (6 ft 5 in)
- Weight: 83 kg (183 lb)

Playing career^{1}
Years	Club	Games (Goals)
1959–1965	Geelong	86 (76)
- ^{1} Playing statistics correct to the end of 1965.

John Yeates (born 30 August 1938) is a former Australian rules footballer who played with Geelong in the Victorian Football League (VFL).

== Family ==
His son Mark played at Geelong in the 1980s and became famous for his part in the 1989 VFL Grand Final.

== Football ==
Geelong's captain in 1961 and 1962, Yeates was a member of their premiership side in 1963 and kicked two goals in the grand final.

On 6 July 1963 he was a member of the Geelong team that were comprehensively and unexpectedly beaten by Fitzroy, 9.13 (67) to 3.13 (31) in the 1963 Miracle Match.

He later played and coached West Gambier Football Club in the Western Border Football League.

== See also ==
- 1963 Miracle Match
