= Bob Beattie (footballer) =

Australian rules footballer

Personal information
- Born: 1 September 1943 (age 83)
- Original team: North Reservoir
- Height: 187 cm (6 ft 2 in)
- Weight: 76 kg (168 lb)

Playing career
| Years | Club | Games (Goals) |
| 1962–1967 | Fitzroy | 58 (1) |

Bob Beattie (born 1 September 1943) is a former Australian rules footballer who played for Fitzroy in the Victorian Football League (VFL).

== Football ==
Beattie made his debut for Fitzroy in 1962 and played 58 Victorian football league matches until 1967.

On 6 July 1963, playing on the half-back flank, he was a member of the young and inexperienced Fitzroy team that comprehensively and unexpectedly defeated Geelong, 9.13 (67) to 3.13 (31) in the 1963 Miracle Match.

== See also ==
- 1963 Miracle Match
