= Matt Goggin =

Australian rules footballer

Personal information
- Full name: Matt Goggin
- Born: 21 July 1936
- Died: 2 February 1972 (aged 35); Melton, Victoria
- Original team: Lethbridge
- Height: 180 cm (5 ft 11 in)
- Weight: 76 kg (168 lb)
- Position: Wing

Playing career^{1}
Years	Club	Games (Goals)
1955–61	Geelong	88 (5)
- ^{1} Playing statistics correct to the end of 1961.

Matt Goggin (21 July 1936 – 2 February 1972) was a former Australian rules footballer who played with Geelong in the Victorian Football League (VFL).

The older brother of Geelong captain Bill Goggin, Matt was electrocuted and killed in a workplace accident in February 1972 whilst working as a linesman for the State Electricity Commission of Victoria.
