= Routley =

Routley is a surname. Notable people with the surname include:

- Bill Routley (born 1948), Canadian politician
- Doug Routley (born 1961), Canadian politician
- Erik Routley (1917–1982), English composer and musicologist
- Hugh Routley (born 1940), Australian rules footballer
- Jane Routley (born 1962), Australian writer
- Richard Routley, later known as Richard Sylvan (1935–1996), New Zealand–born philosopher
