= Ray Slocum =

Australian rules footballer and coach

Personal information
- Full name: Raymond Slocum
- Born: 16 August 1936
- Died: 14 November 2013 (aged 76)
- Original team: Fitzroy reserves
- Height: 170 cm (5 ft 7 in)
- Weight: 67 kg (148 lb)
- Position: Wing

Playing career^{1}
Years	Club	Games (Goals)
1957–1965	Fitzroy	121 (47)

Coaching career
Years	Club	Games (W–L–D)
1968	Fitzroy	1 (0–1–0)
- ^{1} Playing statistics correct to the end of 1965.

Raymond "Ray" Slocum (16 August 1936 – 14 November 2013) was an Australian rules footballer who played for Fitzroy in the Victorian Football League (VFL).

== Football ==
Recruited locally, Slocum developed into a wingman after being used initially as a rover and at half forward.

On 6 July 1963, he was the 20th man for the young and inexperienced Fitzroy team that comprehensively and unexpectedly defeated Geelong, 9.13 (67) to 3.13 (31) in the 1963 Miracle Match.

== Coach ==
After retiring he became coach of the Fitzroy reserves and filled in as senior coach for a match against Hawthorn in the 1968 VFL season. He would later coach Eltham and steered them to the 1972 Diamond Valley Football League premiership.

== See also ==
- 1963 Miracle Match
