= Gary Lazarus =

Australian rules footballer

Personal information
- Born: 21 September 1945 (age 81)
- Original team: Fitzroy Thirds
- Height: 188 cm (6 ft 2 in)
- Weight: 89 kg (196 lb)

Playing career^{1}
Years	Club	Games (Goals)
1963–1970	Fitzroy	132 (206)
- ^{1} Playing statistics correct to the end of 1970.

Gary Lazarus (born 21 September 1945) is a former Australian rules footballer who played with Fitzroy in the VFL during the 1960s.

== Football ==
=== Fitzroy (VFL) ===
Lazarus came to Fitzroy straight from the thirds, without playing a single reserves game. He was used by Fitzroy mainly as a key forward and in the ruck. On four occasions, 1963, 1965, 1966 and 1967 he topped Fitzroy's goalkicking. He kicked a career high 39 goals in the 1966 season.

On 6 July 1963, playing at full-forward, and kicking four goals, he was a member of the young and inexperienced Fitzroy team that comprehensively and unexpectedly defeated Geelong, 9.13 (67) to 3.13 (31) in the 1963 Miracle Match.

== See also ==
- 1963 Miracle Match
