= Paul Vinar =

Australian rules footballer (1940–2009)

Personal information
- Full name: Pavel Vinar
- Born: 24 March 1940; Czechoslovakia
- Died: 20 May 2009 (aged 69); Tasmania, Australia
- Original team: Barwon
- Debut: 15 June 1959, Geelong vs. Carlton, at Kardinia Park
- Height: 188 cm (6 ft 2 in)
- Weight: 83 kg (183 lb)

Playing career^{1}
Years	Club	Games (Goals)
1959–1966	Geelong	132 (45)
- ^{1} Playing statistics correct to the end of 1966.

Pavel "Paul" Vinar (24 March 1940 – 20 May 2009) was an Australian rules footballer who played with Geelong in the VFL during the 1960s.

== Family ==
Vinar was born in Czechoslovakia, and moved to Geelong in Australia with his mother and four brothers after his father was killed in World War II. Despite being Czech, his nickname was Swede.

== Football ==
He was known for his long kicking ability. A highly regarded defender and occasional ruckman, he was also a nationally recognised long kicking champion considered to have the longest and most accurate kick of his era. Bob Davis, his coach during his time with the Geelong, thought Vinar had the best drop kick he had ever seen.

He began playing for the Geelong Football Club's under-19s, and made his VFL debut on 15 June 1959, aged 19, against Carlton at Kardinia Park.

Vinar was a utility player, often used at full back or in the ruck. He was a follower in the club's 1963 premiership side. On 6 July 1963 he was a member of the Geelong team that were comprehensively and unexpectedly beaten by Fitzroy, 9.13 (67) to 3.13 (31) in the 1963 Miracle Match.

Vinar moved to Tasmania in 1967 to take up the coaching role for Longford after which he became a regular Tasmanian representative, including at the 1969 National Carnival and in Tasmania’s historic victory over Western Australia in 1970 where he was named best player. Following his 5 seasons at Longford he moved to Launceston, which was also in the Northern Tasmanian Football Association.

Right to the end of his senior playing career Paul Vinar was still able to kick the ball well over 65 metres. Vinar's playing record included: 132 games (Geelong, 1959–66); 104 games (Longford, 1967–71); 45 games (Launceston, 1972–74); 15 games (NTFA, 1967-72); 7 games (Tasmania, 1967–71).

Paul Vinar was recognised with the Lefroy Medal as Tasmania's best representative player, is a Life Member of the Longford CLub and was inducted in the Tasmanian Football Hall of Fame.

== See also ==
- 1963 Miracle Match
