= Ron Harvey (Australian rules footballer) =

Australian rules footballer (1935–1991)

Personal information
- Full name: Ronald Joseph Harvey
- Born: 11 November 1935; Annandale, New South Wales
- Died: 25 October 1991 (aged 55); Ballarat, Victoria
- Original team: Parade College
- Height: 192 cm (6 ft 4 in)
- Weight: 92 kg (203 lb)
- Positions: Ruck, Forward

Playing career^{1}
Years	Club	Games (Goals)
1954–1963	Fitzroy	127 (49)
- ^{1} Playing statistics correct to the end of 1963.

Career highlights
- Fitzroy Club Champion: 1959

Ronald Joseph Harvey (11 November 1935 – 25 October 1991) was an Australian rules footballer who played with Fitzroy in the VFL.

== Family ==
The son of Joseph Henry Harvey (1897-1969), and Elizabeth Agnes Harvey (1903-1973), née Morris, Ronald Joseph Harvey, was born at Annandale, New South Wales, on 11 November 1935.

He married Patricia Anne Dillon (1938-) in 1957. They had four children.

== Fitzroy (VFL) ==
Harvey, who worked his way up from the Thirds and the Seconds, making his senior debut against Richmond, at the Brunswick Street Oval on 12 June 1954, played most of his career as a ruckman but was also used, on occasion, as a forward.

In 1959 he won Fitzroy's best and fairest award; in 1962 he finished equal sixth in the Brownlow Medal (along with Brian Gray, Verdun Howell, and Bob Skilton); and he represented Victoria twice in his career.

=== 1959 Night premiership ===
He was a member of Fitzroy's 1959 Night Premiership team.

=== 1963 Miracle Match ===
On 6 July 1963, playing at centre half-forward, he was captain of the young and inexperienced Fitzroy team that comprehensively and unexpectedly defeated Geelong, 9.13 (67) to 3.13 (31) in the 1963 Miracle Match.

== After Fitzroy ==
From 1964 to 1966 he played, as captain-coach, with the Wodonga Football Club in the Ovens & Murray Football League (OMFL), winning the Club's Best and Fairest Award in 1964.

In 1967 he was the captain-coach of the Coolamon Football Club in the Riverina's South West Football League (New South Wales) (SWDFL).

== Death ==
He died at Ballarat, Victoria on 25 October 1991.

== See also ==
- 1959 Night Series Cup
- 1963 Miracle Match
- Winners: Wodonga Football Club's Best and Fairest
