= Stewart Lord =

Australian rules footballer (1940–2022)

Personal information
- Born: 9 April 1940
- Died: 4 March 2022 (aged 81)
- Original team: Cobden
- Height: 178 cm (5 ft 10 in)
- Weight: 84 kg (185 lb)

Playing career^{1}
| Years | Club | Games (Goals) |
| 1960–1964 | Geelong | 74 (13) |
- ^{1} Playing statistics correct to the end of 1964.

Stewart Lord (9 April 1940 – 4 March 2022) was an Australian rules footballer who played with Geelong in the VFL during the early 1960s. He was the identical twin brother of teammate Alistair Lord, who won the Brownlow Medal in 1962.

Stewart Lord usually played at halfback although he played his first season in the forward line when he kicked all of his 13 career goals.

A member of Geelong's 1963 premiership team, he retired at the end of 1964, aged 24, to become a coach.

Lord captain-coached Camperdown and was non-playing coach of Geelong West.

== See also ==
- 1963 Miracle Match
