= Alistair Lord =

Australian rules footballer

Personal information
- Born: 9 April 1940 (age 86)
- Original team: Cobden
- Height: 180 cm (5 ft 11 in)
- Weight: 85 kg (187 lb)

Playing career^{1}
Years	Club	Games (Goals)
1959–1966	Geelong	122 (79)
- ^{1} Playing statistics correct to the end of 1966.

Career highlights
- 1962 Brownlow Medal; Geelong premiership player 1963

Alistair Lord (born 9 April 1940) is a former Australian rules footballer who played for Geelong during the late 1950s to the mid-1960s.

Lord played as a centreman and debuted in 1959. He won the Brownlow Medal in 1962, and the Carji Greeves Medal, averaging 30 disposals a game for the year. In 1963, he became a member of Geelong's premiership side, playing alongside his identical twin brother Stewart.

Lord retired at 26 years old and returned to the family farm at Cobden. He accepted a position as captain-coach of South Warrnambool in the Hampden League. He often played against his twin brother Stewart, who was captain-coach of Camperdown at the time.
