= Ian McCrae (Australian footballer) =

Australian rules footballer

Personal information
- Full name: Ian McCrae
- Born: 31 October 1943
- Original team: North Reservoir
- Height: 175 cm (5 ft 9 in)
- Weight: 69 kg (152 lb)
- Position: Wing

Playing career^{1}
Years	Club	Games (Goals)
1962–70	Fitzroy	97 (50)
- ^{1} Playing statistics correct to the end of 1970.

Ian McCrae (born 31 October 1943) is a former Australian rules footballer who played with Fitzroy in the Victorian Football League (VFL).

== Football ==
On 6 July 1963, playing as second rover (resting in the forward-pocket), and kicking one goal, he was a member of the young and inexperienced Fitzroy team that comprehensively and unexpectedly defeated Geelong, 9.13 (67) to 3.13 (31) in the 1963 Miracle Match.

== See also ==
- 1963 Miracle Match
