= John Brown (Australian footballer, born 1937) =

Australian rules footballer (1937–2001)

Personal information
- Full name: John Brown
- Born: 8 May 1937
- Died: 8 July 2001 (aged 64)
- Original team: Stawell
- Height: 183 cm (6 ft 0 in)
- Weight: 76 kg (168 lb)
- Position: Wingman

Playing career^{1}
Years	Club	Games (Goals)
1960–1964	Geelong	48 (4)
- ^{1} Playing statistics correct to the end of 1964.

John Brown (8 May 1937 – 8 July 2001) was an Australian rules footballer who played with Geelong in the Victorian Football League (VFL) during the 1960s.

Brown was recruited from Stawell were in 1959 won the club's best and fairest.

The following year he commenced with Geelong.

Brown was a wingman in Geelong's 1963 premiership team.
