= Nick Rutley =

Australian rules football coach (born 1984)

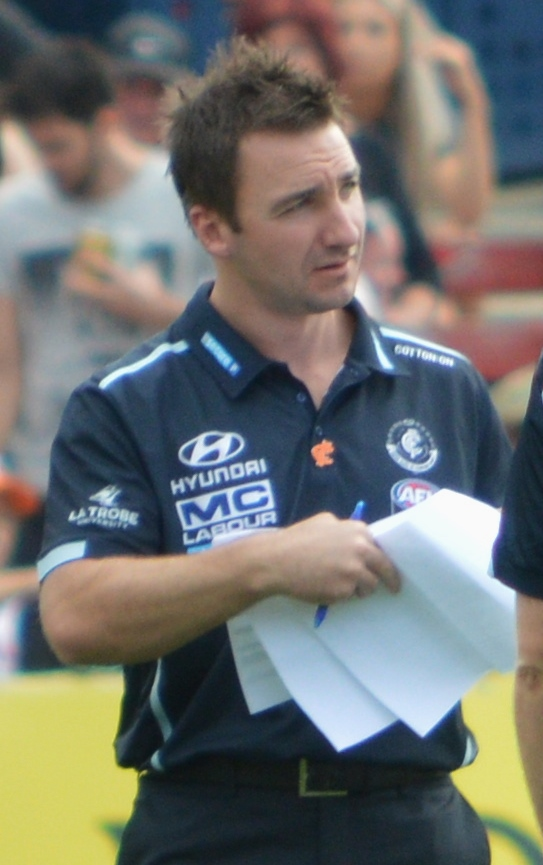
- Rutley as Carlton assistant coach in March 2018

Personal information
- Born: 1984 (age 41–42)

Coaching career^{3}
Years	Club	Games (W–L–D)
2018	Carlton (W)	2 (1–1–0)
Total		2 (1–1–0)
- ^{3} Coaching statistics correct as of 2018.

Nick Rutley (born 1984) is an Australian rules football coach who currently serves as the lead assistant coach of the Carlton Football Club in the AFL Women's competition (AFLW).

== Coaching career ==
Rutley's coaching career began in earnest in 2014 with a development coaching role at the Casey Scorpions. He later moved on to the same role at the Box Hill Hawks in 2015. In 2016 Rutley served as the midfield assistant at the Calder Cannons in the TAC Cup.

In October 2016 Rutley was appointed as the head coach of the Wandin Football Coach in the Yarra Ranges Football & Netball League.

He also holds a level two AFL coaching accreditation.

=== AFL Women's ===
Rutley was appointed to the assistant coaching panel of Carlton's AFL Women's side in October 2017. He served in the role in round 1 of the 2018 season before illness forced head coach Damien Keeping to temporarily stand aside and Rutley to be appointed caretaker for the club's round 2 match against Greater Western Sydney. He coached to the team to a 21-point win in that match at Drummoyne Oval in Sydney. Rutley coached the team in round 3 as well before Keeping returned in round 4. Rutley recorded one win and one loss during his time as interim coach.

== Coaching statistics ==
Statistics are correct to the end of 2018

Legend
W	Wins	L	Losses	D	Draws	W%	Winning percentage	LP	Ladder position	LT	League teams

Season	Team	Games	W	L	D	W %	LP	LT
2017	Carlton	2	1	1	0	50%	—N/a	8
Career totals		2	1	1	0	50%		

^Rutley was Carlton's caretaker coach for two weeks during 2018.
