= Leo Tasker =

Australian rules footballer, born 1900

Personal information
- Full name: Thomas Leo Tasker
- Born: 21 October 1900; Ballarat East, Victoria
- Died: 1 June 1948 (aged 47); Parkville, Victoria
- Original team: Geelong High School

Playing career^{1}
Years	Club	Games (Goals)
1917	Geelong	5 (2)
1918–19	Carlton	15 (13)
Total		20 (15)
- ^{1} Playing statistics correct to the end of 1919.

Thomas Leo Tasker (21 October 1900 – 1 June 1948) was an Australian rules footballer who played with Geelong and Carlton in the Victorian Football League (VFL).
