= Brett Pollock (footballer) =

Australian rules footballer

Personal information
- Full name: Howard Brett Pollock
- Born: 27 November 1942; Fairfield, Victoria
- Died: 22 July 1982 (aged 39); Parkville, Victoria
- Original team: Flinders Naval Depot
- Height: 180 cm (5 ft 11 in)
- Weight: 80 kg (176 lb)

Playing career^{1}
| Years | Club | Games (Goals) |
| 1963 | Fitzroy | 10 (7) |
- ^{1} Playing statistics correct to the end of 1963.

Howard Brett Pollock (27 November 1942 – 22 July 1982) was an Australian rules footballer who played with Fitzroy in the Victorian Football League (VFL).
