= Stewart Duncan (footballer) =

Australian rules footballer (1940–2024)

Personal information
- Born: 5 June 1940
- Died: 18 July 2024 (aged 84)
- Height: 196 cm (6 ft 5 in)
- Weight: 97 kg (214 lb)
- Position: Ruck

Playing career
Years	Club	Games (Goals)
1960–1964	Fitzroy	30 (7)

Stewart Duncan (5 June 1940 – 18 July 2024) was an Australian rules footballer who played with Fitzroy in the Victorian Football League (VFL). He died on 18 July 2024, at the age of 84.
