= Joe Dixon (Australian footballer) =

Australian rules footballer (1940–2023)

Personal information
- Full name: Joseph Matthew Dixon
- Born: 31 May 1940
- Died: 23 April 2023 (aged 82)
- Original team: Yarrawonga
- Height: 188 cm (6 ft 2 in)
- Weight: 86 kg (190 lb)

Playing career^{1}
Years	Club	Games (Goals)
1963	Fitzroy	5 (0)
- ^{1} Playing statistics correct to the end of 1963.

Joseph Matthew Dixon (31 May 1940 – 26 April 2023) was an Australian rules footballer who played with Fitzroy in the Victorian Football League (VFL).

Dixon's son Ben Dixon played for Hawthorn Football Club.
