= John K. Watts =

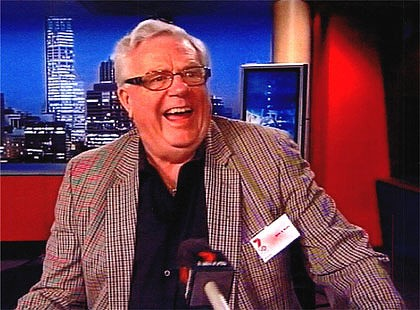
- John K. Watts at Channel 7 Studios Perth, 2009

Personal information
- Full name: John Albert Watts
- Born: 21 January 1937; East Perth, Western Australia
- Died: 3 June 2017 (aged 80)
- Original team: Bayswater Juniors
- Height: 191 cm (6 ft 3 in)
- Weight: 94 kg (207 lb)

Playing career^{1}
Years	Club	Games (Goals)
1954–1962	East Perth	166 (9)
1963–1965	Geelong	52 (4)
1966–1968	Hobart	53

Representative team honours
Years	Team	Games (Goals)
1957–1960	Western Australia	12 (0)
1966–1968	TANFL	2

Coaching career
Years	Club	Games (W–L–D)
1966–1968	Hobart	61 (24-36-1)
- ^{1} Playing statistics correct to the end of 1968.

Career highlights
- East Perth premiership player – 1956, 1958 and 1959; Geelong premiership player – 1963; Hobart premiership captain-coach 1966; Simpson Medallist

John Albert Watts (later known as John K. Watts, 21 January 1937 – 3 June 2017) was an Australian rules football player and radio broadcaster and television personality. He worked in the police force before starting his football career.

== Football career ==
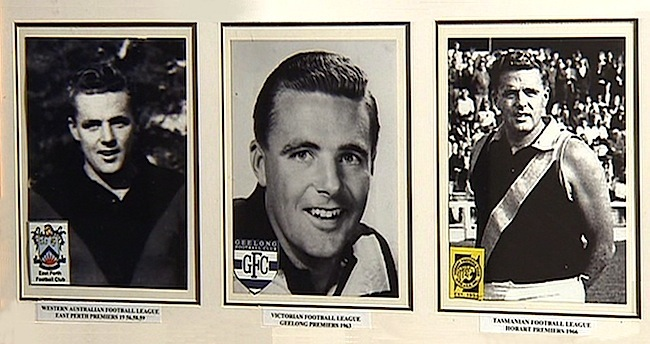
The three major Football Clubs J.K. Watts played for.

Watts debuted for the East Perth Football Club on a half back flank against Subiaco at the age of 17 in 1954 and would become a regular player with the club. In 1963 he was a member of the Geelong football team. In 1966, Watts moved to Tasmania to Captain/Coach the Hobart Football Club. This success would make him the only Australian rules football player to have played in three premiership sides, for three different teams, in three different states. He retired from playing football in 1968.

It was during these events that he wrote several club anthems. He wrote the East Perth Football Club, Swan Districts and Geelong Football Club theme songs.

In March 2008 he was inducted into the West Australian Football Hall of Fame.

== Media career ==
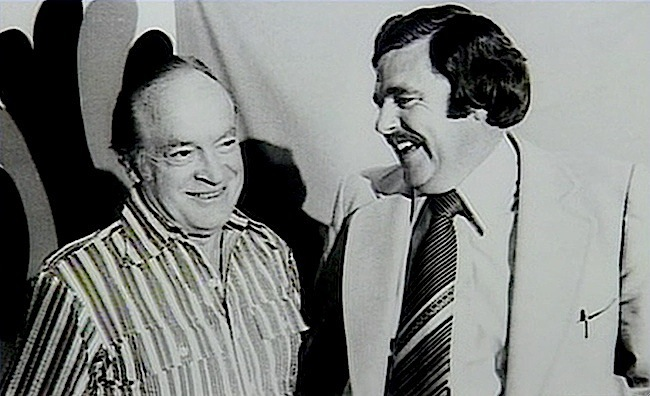
John K. Watts and Bob Hope

After retiring from football, Watts began working in radio and television. Over a span of 30 years, he worked with multiple television and radio stations. He wrote for comedians Bob Hope and Harry Secombe and made contributions to magazines and published his own joke books.

Watts appeared on TVW 7's inaugural televised Football Panel and World of Sport segments, hosted by Ross Mewburn Elliott. He appeared on the Football and Sports review on Channel 7 News and became a familiar entertainer and panelist on TVW 7's Telethon.

== Work with George Chapman ==
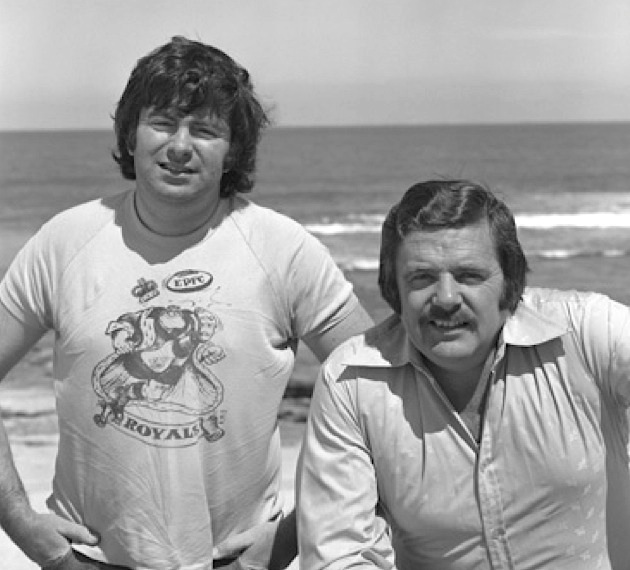
The "Dynamic Duo" Wattsie and Martin

In the early 1970s, John Watts received an offer from George Chapman, the head of Perth Radio Station 6PM, to collaborate with popular DJ and radio producer Barry Martin in creating a variety-style radio program.

By the late 1970s, they had earned the moniker of the "Dynamic Duo". They welcomed Qantas Airways' first B747 to Perth, promoting the Australind Train Service to Bunbury, and celebrating the relaunch of the Indian Pacific Train Service (for which John Watts penned another song).

== Business career ==
John K Watts ventured into the world of business and owned several radio stations and hotels in Perth. His entrepreneurial endeavors expanded to encompass various football, horse-racing, and hotel ventures, solidifying his reputation as a highly accomplished businessman.

During this period, Watts had the idea to integrate a West Australian team into the Victorian Football League (now known as the Australian Football League), however, rival factions within the West Australian Football League boycotted this proposal. Unfazed by the opposition, John rallied the support of figures such as Lindsay Fox and Alan Delaney, who shared his vision. Their collective efforts eventually led to the birth of the West Coast Eagles.

== Personal life ==
John Watts had three daughters: Joanna, Donna (deceased), and Venessa, as well as two sons named Luke and Jonathon. Throughout his life, John entered into three marriages. In the year 2000, he married Lorraine Watts (née Goodwin), his third wife, in Las Vegas. They resided in Scarborough, a coastal city in Western Australia.

During his lifetime, Watts faced various health challenges. He underwent surgery to remove a melanoma from the back of his neck during his football playing days and continued to play football while recovering. In the year 2000, he was diagnosed with prostate cancer. Later, in November 2011, he received the diagnosis of a form of bone cancer.

On June 3, 2017, Watts died at the age of 80. His departure occurred at his home in Scarborough, where he found solace in the serene presence of the Indian Ocean.

== Discography ==
=== Studio albums ===
List of albums, with Australian chart positions
Title	Album details	Peak chart positions
Title	Album details	AUS
Martin & Watts Stage Debut (as Martin & Watts)	Released: 1977; Format: LP; Label: Woodduck Records (WD 001)	88

== See also ==
- 1963 Miracle Match
