= Bob Davis (Australian rules footballer) =

Australian rules footballer, born 1928

Personal information
- Full name: Robert Davis
- Born: 12 June 1928; Golden Point, Victoria
- Died: 16 May 2011 (aged 82); Geelong, Victoria, Australia
- Original team: Clunes (CHFL)/ Golden Point (BFL)
- Height: 183 cm (6 ft 0 in)
- Weight: 91 kg (201 lb)

Playing career^{1}
Years	Club	Games (Goals)
1948–1958	Geelong	189 (149)

Coaching career^{3}
Years	Club	Games (W–L–D)
1956–1965	Geelong	116 (72–39–5)
- ^{1} Playing statistics correct to the end of 1958.^{3} Coaching statistics correct as of 1965.

Career highlights
- Geelong premiership player 1951, 1952; Geelong premiership coach 1963; Geelong Team of the Century; Geelong captain 1955–1958; Carji Greeves Medal 1957; All-Australian captain 1958

Robert "Bob" Davis (12 June 1928 – 16 May 2011) was an Australian rules footballer who played in the Victorian Football League (VFL).

== Early life ==
Bob Davis was born in Clunes and as a teenager he boarded and attended at Ballarat College. A keen South Melbourne supporter he attended a preseason training with the club but was told his services would not be necessary. He returned to Ballarat and played locally with Golden Point. He was spotted by Geelong recruiters and he was invited to try out with Geelong.

== VFL career ==
Nicknamed "Woofa", Davis was recruited from Golden Point in the Ballarat Football League and played with the Geelong Football Club in the VFL from 1948 to 1958, generally as a half-forward flanker.

He made his debut in the opening round of 1948, on a two-match permit issued by his club Golden Point. He missed the next two games because Golden Point refused to clear him. The Geelong president met with the Golden Point committee, and, after a long discussion, Davis's clearance was granted. He made the state side for the first time in 1949.

At 183 cm (6 feet) in height, Davis was noted for his pace and tenacity. He was one of the fastest players in the League at the time, and was known in the press as "The Geelong Flyer", named after the express train that ran from Melbourne to Geelong in only 55 minutes.

Davis represented Victoria on 13 occasions, as well as the captaining Geelong from 1955 to 1958. He played in two premierships for Geelong, in 1951 and 1952. He also coached the club, first in 1956, and then from 1960 to 1965, which included coaching Geelong to the VFL premiership in 1963, defeating Hawthorn.

In 1952, after playing only 51 games for Geelong, Davis was offered a coaching job with the South Adelaide Football Club in the South Australian National Football League. He moved to Adelaide for the start of the 1952 season, but after Geelong refused to clear him, he returned to Geelong in time for the sixth game of the season, and he remained there for the remainder of his career.

== Post-playing career ==
During his career, Davis was a popular character off the field, with his much-imitated flamboyant voice – in particular the phrase "fair dinkum unbelievable", which has been imitated many times in the football world, usually with humorous but respectful intent. He appeared on many television shows in the 1970s and '80s, including World of Sport and League Teams with Lou Richards and Jack Dyer.

He died in hospital on 16 May 2011 after a long battle with illness in his last months. Before the Carlton–Geelong game later that week, they held a minute's silence.

Clunes Football Club Davis's original club scrapped their traditional Black and White for a one-off tribute game post his death. They donned Geelong-styled guernseys for one game, and they displayed both club's logos and the name Bob Davis on the back.
