= 1963 VFL season =

67th season of the Victorian Football League (VFL)

1963 VFL premiership season
- Teams: 12
- Premiers: Geelong; 6th premiership
- Minor premiers: Hawthorn; 2nd minor premiership
- Consolation series: Footscray; 1st Consolation series win
- Brownlow Medallist: Bob Skilton (South Melbourne)
- Coleman Medallist: John Peck (Hawthorn)
- Matches played: 112
- Highest: 101,209

The 1963 VFL season was the 67th season of the Victorian Football League (VFL), the highest level senior Australian rules football competition in Victoria. The season featured twelve clubs, ran from 20 April until 5 October, and comprised an 18-game home-and-away season followed by a finals series featuring the top four clubs.

The premiership was won by the Geelong Football Club for the sixth time, after it defeated Hawthorn by 49 points in the 1963 VFL Grand Final.

== Background ==
In 1963, the VFL competition consisted of twelve teams of 18 on-the-field players each, plus two substitute players, known as the 19th man and the 20th man. A player could be substituted for any reason; however, once substituted, a player could not return to the field of play under any circumstances. Teams played each other in a home-and-away season of 18 rounds; matches 12 to 18 were the "home-and-way reverse" of matches 1 to 7. Once the 18 round home-and-away season had finished, the 1963 VFL Premiers were determined by the specific format and conventions of the Page–McIntyre system.

Persistent rain throughout the week and further heavy downpours on the Friday (12 July) caused the postponement of all Round 11 matches until the following Saturday (20 July). All remaining home-and-away and finals matches were played a week later than had been scheduled.

== Home-and-away season ==
=== Round 1 ===
Home team	Home team score	Away team	Away team score	Venue	Crowd	Date
Geelong	16.26 (122)	South Melbourne	9.9 (63)	Kardinia Park	33,953	20 April 1963
St Kilda	13.5 (83)	Melbourne	9.11 (65)	Junction Oval	31,300	20 April 1963
North Melbourne	11.11 (77)	Footscray	5.10 (40)	Arden Street Oval	21,960	20 April 1963
Hawthorn	8.12 (60)	Essendon	13.7 (85)	Glenferrie Oval	30,000	20 April 1963
Richmond	11.14 (80)	Collingwood	18.16 (124)	Punt Road Oval	32,200	20 April 1963
Fitzroy	10.12 (72)	Carlton	14.11 (95)	Brunswick Street Oval	25,167	20 April 1963

=== Round 2 ===
Home team	Home team score	Away team	Away team score	Venue	Crowd	Date
South Melbourne	12.14 (86)	Richmond	17.7 (109)	Lake Oval	25,700	25 April 1963
Melbourne	14.16 (100)	Hawthorn	13.18 (96)	MCG	55,293	25 April 1963
Essendon	16.13 (109)	Geelong	6.14 (50)	Windy Hill	40,000	27 April 1963
Collingwood	8.14 (62)	North Melbourne	12.9 (81)	Victoria Park	32,210	27 April 1963
Carlton	7.11 (53)	St Kilda	6.15 (51)	Princes Park	39,490	27 April 1963
Footscray	15.11 (101)	Fitzroy	7.13 (55)	Western Oval	21,791	27 April 1963

=== Round 3 ===
Home team	Home team score	Away team	Away team score	Venue	Crowd	Date
Fitzroy	9.13 (67)	St Kilda	11.11 (77)	Brunswick Street Oval	18,544	4 May 1963
Essendon	9.14 (68)	Melbourne	9.9 (63)	Windy Hill	27,283	4 May 1963
Collingwood	8.16 (64)	Hawthorn	13.22 (100)	Victoria Park	27,419	4 May 1963
Richmond	6.12 (48)	North Melbourne	10.9 (69)	Punt Road Oval	23,200	4 May 1963
Geelong	10.25 (85)	Footscray	10.4 (64)	Kardinia Park	26,523	4 May 1963
South Melbourne	10.14 (74)	Carlton	16.15 (111)	Lake Oval	22,850	4 May 1963

=== Round 4 ===
Home team	Home team score	Away team	Away team score	Venue	Crowd	Date
Hawthorn	21.25 (151)	South Melbourne	11.14 (80)	Glenferrie Oval	15,000	11 May 1963
Footscray	14.12 (96)	Richmond	11.11 (77)	Western Oval	21,695	11 May 1963
Carlton	9.13 (67)	Essendon	8.13 (61)	Princes Park	42,919	11 May 1963
North Melbourne	3.7 (25)	Geelong	7.19 (61)	Arden Street Oval	21,700	11 May 1963
Melbourne	14.10 (94)	Fitzroy	8.7 (55)	MCG	25,462	11 May 1963
St Kilda	14.13 (97)	Collingwood	11.7 (73)	Junction Oval	37,700	11 May 1963

=== Round 5 ===
Home team	Home team score	Away team	Away team score	Venue	Crowd	Date
Geelong	10.12 (72)	St Kilda	3.11 (29)	Kardinia Park	33,084	18 May 1963
Footscray	8.9 (57)	Hawthorn	11.10 (76)	Western Oval	22,251	18 May 1963
Collingwood	15.10 (100)	Melbourne	7.10 (52)	Victoria Park	30,121	18 May 1963
South Melbourne	17.11 (113)	North Melbourne	11.9 (75)	Lake Oval	14,900	18 May 1963
Fitzroy	6.15 (51)	Essendon	16.16 (112)	Brunswick Street Oval	15,504	18 May 1963
Richmond	11.9 (75)	Carlton	11.11 (77)	Punt Road Oval	25,400	18 May 1963

=== Round 6 ===
Home team	Home team score	Away team	Away team score	Venue	Crowd	Date
St Kilda	13.16 (94)	South Melbourne	8.5 (53)	Junction Oval	26,400	25 May 1963
Melbourne	20.15 (135)	Richmond	7.14 (56)	MCG	33,914	25 May 1963
Hawthorn	11.17 (83)	North Melbourne	9.7 (61)	Glenferrie Oval	14,387	25 May 1963
Essendon	13.16 (94)	Footscray	6.18 (54)	Windy Hill	27,455	25 May 1963
Carlton	7.16 (58)	Geelong	7.22 (64)	Princes Park	47,514	25 May 1963
Fitzroy	9.5 (59)	Collingwood	12.14 (86)	Brunswick Street Oval	23,930	25 May 1963

=== Round 7 ===
Home team	Home team score	Away team	Away team score	Venue	Crowd	Date
North Melbourne	8.10 (58)	St Kilda	9.12 (66)	Arden Street Oval	17,125	1 June 1963
Geelong	9.12 (66)	Hawthorn	9.12 (66)	Kardinia Park	29,374	1 June 1963
Collingwood	10.11 (71)	Essendon	13.9 (87)	Victoria Park	44,501	1 June 1963
South Melbourne	11.8 (74)	Melbourne	8.22 (70)	Lake Oval	17,160	1 June 1963
Richmond	17.13 (115)	Fitzroy	13.8 (86)	Punt Road Oval	16,500	1 June 1963
Footscray	7.7 (49)	Carlton	8.9 (57)	Western Oval	26,107	1 June 1963

=== Round 8 ===
Home team	Home team score	Away team	Away team score	Venue	Crowd	Date
Essendon	13.11 (89)	Richmond	7.5 (47)	Windy Hill	21,200	8 June 1963
Carlton	6.8 (44)	Collingwood	6.10 (46)	Princes Park	38,698	8 June 1963
St Kilda	8.13 (61)	Hawthorn	9.11 (65)	Junction Oval	34,900	8 June 1963
Footscray	6.16 (52)	South Melbourne	5.9 (39)	Western Oval	22,950	10 June 1963
Fitzroy	2.11 (23)	North Melbourne	6.15 (51)	Brunswick Street Oval	13,400	10 June 1963
Melbourne	11.16 (82)	Geelong	4.11 (35)	MCG	81,550	10 June 1963

=== Round 9 ===
Home team	Home team score	Away team	Away team score	Venue	Crowd	Date
Melbourne	18.6 (114)	North Melbourne	9.10 (64)	MCG	23,971	22 June 1963
Geelong	16.13 (109)	Richmond	10.11 (71)	Kardinia Park	20,681	22 June 1963
Essendon	4.16 (40)	St Kilda	8.8 (56)	Windy Hill	24,725	22 June 1963
Collingwood	11.6 (72)	Footscray	6.4 (40)	Victoria Park	26,173	22 June 1963
South Melbourne	8.10 (58)	Fitzroy	5.9 (39)	Lake Oval	12,850	22 June 1963
Hawthorn	9.6 (60)	Carlton	7.12 (54)	Glenferrie Oval	25,300	22 June 1963

=== Round 10 ===
Home team	Home team score	Away team	Away team score	Venue	Crowd	Date
Collingwood	19.11 (125)	South Melbourne	11.8 (74)	Victoria Park	24,820	29 June 1963
Carlton	8.8 (56)	Melbourne	12.12 (84)	Princes Park	32,600	29 June 1963
St Kilda	14.13 (97)	Footscray	15.11 (101)	Junction Oval	27,700	29 June 1963
Fitzroy	9.13 (67)	Geelong	3.13 (31)	Brunswick Street Oval	16,221	6 July 1963
Richmond	4.10 (34)	Hawthorn	11.14 (80)	Punt Road Oval	20,300	6 July 1963
North Melbourne	5.5 (35)	Essendon	9.9 (63)	Arden Street Oval	17,560	6 July 1963

=== Round 11 ===
Home team	Home team score	Away team	Away team score	Venue	Crowd	Date
Richmond	9.4 (58)	St Kilda	14.16 (100)	Punt Road Oval	15,000	20 July 1963
Footscray	3.6 (24)	Melbourne	10.9 (69)	Western Oval	18,231	20 July 1963
Hawthorn	9.17 (71)	Fitzroy	6.2 (38)	Glenferrie Oval	10,500	20 July 1963
South Melbourne	6.10 (46)	Essendon	12.20 (92)	Lake Oval	16,000	20 July 1963
Geelong	7.13 (55)	Collingwood	5.13 (43)	Kardinia Park	31,578	20 July 1963
North Melbourne	8.14 (62)	Carlton	5.9 (39)	Arden Street Oval	13,870	20 July 1963

=== Round 12 ===
Home team	Home team score	Away team	Away team score	Venue	Crowd	Date
Melbourne	14.14 (98)	St Kilda	5.9 (39)	MCG	55,060	27 July 1963
Footscray	10.11 (71)	North Melbourne	7.10 (52)	Western Oval	15,715	27 July 1963
Essendon	11.17 (83)	Hawthorn	7.10 (52)	Windy Hill	25,500	27 July 1963
Collingwood	12.12 (84)	Richmond	13.7 (85)	Victoria Park	23,286	27 July 1963
Carlton	16.19 (115)	Fitzroy	11.8 (74)	Princes Park	16,909	27 July 1963
South Melbourne	8.12 (60)	Geelong	14.11 (95)	Lake Oval	14,500	27 July 1963

=== Round 13 ===
Home team	Home team score	Away team	Away team score	Venue	Crowd	Date
Richmond	9.10 (64)	South Melbourne	20.10 (130)	Punt Road Oval	15,000	3 August 1963
Hawthorn	13.6 (84)	Melbourne	8.14 (62)	Glenferrie Oval	34,000	3 August 1963
Fitzroy	7.7 (49)	Footscray	10.20 (80)	Brunswick Street Oval	13,892	3 August 1963
Geelong	14.15 (99)	Essendon	9.8 (62)	Kardinia Park	40,885	3 August 1963
North Melbourne	9.17 (71)	Collingwood	8.10 (58)	Arden Street Oval	16,083	3 August 1963
St Kilda	14.12 (96)	Carlton	7.13 (55)	Junction Oval	30,100	3 August 1963

=== Round 14 ===
Home team	Home team score	Away team	Away team score	Venue	Crowd	Date
North Melbourne	11.8 (74)	Richmond	10.4 (64)	Arden Street Oval	9,807	10 August 1963
Footscray	5.8 (38)	Geelong	8.10 (58)	Western Oval	25,645	10 August 1963
Carlton	17.13 (115)	South Melbourne	8.9 (57)	Princes Park	17,510	10 August 1963
St Kilda	16.21 (117)	Fitzroy	2.3 (15)	Junction Oval	15,700	10 August 1963
Melbourne	19.8 (122)	Essendon	10.11 (71)	MCG	71,086	10 August 1963
Hawthorn	15.9 (99)	Collingwood	8.9 (57)	Glenferrie Oval	19,458	10 August 1963

=== Round 15 ===
Home team	Home team score	Away team	Away team score	Venue	Crowd	Date
Geelong	15.8 (98)	North Melbourne	5.13 (43)	Kardinia Park	21,396	17 August 1963
Fitzroy	8.9 (57)	Melbourne	22.21 (153)	Brunswick Street Oval	11,989	17 August 1963
Collingwood	6.6 (42)	St Kilda	14.20 (104)	Victoria Park	27,298	17 August 1963
South Melbourne	6.9 (45)	Hawthorn	15.15 (105)	Lake Oval	14,100	17 August 1963
Richmond	7.10 (52)	Footscray	16.21 (117)	Punt Road Oval	15,200	17 August 1963
Essendon	10.10 (70)	Carlton	11.10 (76)	Windy Hill	29,000	17 August 1963

=== Round 16 ===
Home team	Home team score	Away team	Away team score	Venue	Crowd	Date
North Melbourne	12.12 (84)	South Melbourne	5.9 (39)	Arden Street Oval	9,506	24 August 1963
Essendon	16.21 (117)	Fitzroy	5.6 (36)	Windy Hill	14,175	24 August 1963
Carlton	10.18 (78)	Richmond	12.13 (85)	Princes Park	15,170	24 August 1963
St Kilda	12.18 (90)	Geelong	8.21 (69)	Junction Oval	44,900	24 August 1963
Hawthorn	13.21 (99)	Footscray	8.7 (55)	Glenferrie Oval	17,000	24 August 1963
Melbourne	19.15 (129)	Collingwood	10.8 (68)	MCG	43,057	24 August 1963

=== Round 17 ===
Home team	Home team score	Away team	Away team score	Venue	Crowd	Date
Collingwood	20.14 (134)	Fitzroy	12.15 (87)	Victoria Park	16,892	31 August 1963
South Melbourne	8.7 (55)	St Kilda	19.14 (128)	Lake Oval	22,920	31 August 1963
Richmond	7.8 (50)	Melbourne	14.13 (97)	Punt Road Oval	17,780	31 August 1963
North Melbourne	6.9 (45)	Hawthorn	12.14 (86)	Arden Street Oval	12,963	31 August 1963
Footscray	4.4 (28)	Essendon	12.12 (84)	Western Oval	27,231	31 August 1963
Geelong	13.17 (95)	Carlton	5.4 (34)	Kardinia Park	29,732	31 August 1963

=== Round 18 ===
Going into the final home-and-away round, Hawthorn was the only team with a guaranteed finals berth. It was down to Geelong, Melbourne, St Kilda and Essendon to fight it out for the remaining three play-off positions.

Home team	Home team score	Away team	Away team score	Venue	Crowd	Date
Melbourne	12.19 (91)	South Melbourne	8.8 (56)	MCG	24,871	7 September 1963
Fitzroy	8.8 (56)	Richmond	16.13 (109)	Brunswick Street Oval	9,951	7 September 1963
Carlton	13.13 (91)	Footscray	8.11 (59)	Princes Park	15,319	7 September 1963
St Kilda	17.14 (116)	North Melbourne	4.8 (32)	Junction Oval	22,800	7 September 1963
Hawthorn	6.16 (52)	Geelong	13.12 (90)	Glenferrie Oval	35,000	7 September 1963
Essendon	12.11 (83)	Collingwood	8.8 (56)	Windy Hill	29,700	7 September 1963

== Ladder ==
(P)	Premiers
	Qualified for finals

#	Team	P	W	L	D	PF	PA	%	Pts
1	Hawthorn	18	13	4	1	1485	1137	130.6	54
2	Geelong (P)	18	13	4	1	1354	1056	128.2	54
3	Melbourne	18	13	5	0	1680	1136	147.9	52
4	St Kilda	18	13	5	0	1501	1071	140.1	52
5	Essendon	18	13	5	0	1470	1069	137.5	52
6	Carlton	18	10	8	0	1275	1234	103.3	40
7	North Melbourne	18	8	10	0	1059	1244	85.1	32
8	Collingwood	18	7	11	0	1365	1427	95.7	28
9	Footscray	18	7	11	0	1126	1283	87.8	28
10	Richmond	18	5	13	0	1279	1687	75.8	20
11	South Melbourne	18	4	14	0	1202	1722	69.8	16
12	Fitzroy	18	1	17	0	986	1716	57.5	4

Rules for classification: 1. premiership points; 2. percentage; 3. points for
Average score: 73.1
Source: AFL Tables

== Finals series ==
=== Semi-finals ===
	First Semi-final
Saturday, 14 September (2:30 pm)	Melbourne 9.17 (71)	def.	St Kilda 8.16 (64)	MCG (crowd: 88,914)	Report
This match set new records for crowd attendance at a VFL First Semi-final and gate takings (£29,420)

	Second Semi-final
Saturday, 21 September (2:30 pm)	Hawthorn 11.16 (82)	def. by	Geelong 14.17 (101)	MCG (crowd: 91,471)	Report

=== Preliminary final ===
	Preliminary final
Saturday, 28 September (2:30 pm)	Hawthorn 11.11 (77)	def.	Melbourne 10.8 (68)	MCG (crowd: 86,586)	Report

=== Grand final ===
	Grand final
Saturday, 5 October (2:50 pm)	Hawthorn 8.12 (60)	def. by	Geelong 15.19 (109)	MCG (crowd: 101,209)	Report

== Consolation Night Series Competition ==
The night series were held under the floodlights at Lake Oval, South Melbourne, for the teams (5th to 12th on ladder) out of the finals at the end of the season.

Final: Footscray 10.9 (69) defeated Richmond 9.9 (63)

== Season notes ==
- In Round 5, Collingwood was the first team to score at least 100 points against Melbourne since Footscray in the 1954 Grand Final; Terry Waters kicked 7 goals in Collingwood's 15.10 (100) to 7.10 (52) victory.
- On Saturday 15 June, South Australia beat Victoria 12.8 (80) to 10.13 (73) at the Melbourne Cricket Ground in front of 59,260 spectators. In a brutal return match, in Adelaide, a straighter-kicking Victoria beat South Australia 8.6 (54) to 5.12 (42), a match notorious for a powerful king-hit delivered by Victorian John Peck, who had been included in the team for the return match in order to provide more "grunt" and physical menace, to the jaw of an unsuspecting Brian Sawley. Sawley went some distance in the air before collapsing unconscious in the mud, and had to be carried from the field on a stretcher. Peck was reported, and at the VFL tribunal, Peck testified that the king-hit was in retaliation for Sawley having kicked him in the stomach; Peck was suspended for two weeks.
- Fitzroy's only win during the year was against eventual premiers Geelong, and was achieved without captain-coach Kevin Murray, who was in Adelaide playing for Victoria. Reserves captain Wally Clark took over, and Geelong's weakness in terrible conditions proved their undoing.
- Owing to extremely cold and wet weather, Round 11 was postponed from 13 to 20 July. As of 2024, this is the last time that a complete round of football has been postponed due to weather.
- As of 2024, this is the most recent season that both of the previous year’s Grand Finalists would miss the finals.

== Awards ==
- The 1963 VFL Premiership team was Geelong.
- The VFL's leading goalkicker was John Peck of Hawthorn who kicked 75 goals (including 6 goals in the final series).
- The winner of the 1963 Brownlow Medal was Bob Skilton of South Melbourne with 20 votes.
- Fitzroy took the "wooden spoon" in 1963.
- The reserves premiership was won by Geelong. Geelong 13.12 (90) defeated St Kilda 7.11 (53) in the Grand Final, held as a curtain-raiser to the seniors Grand Final at the Melbourne Cricket Ground on 5 October.

== See also ==
- 1963 Miracle Match

== Sources ==
- 1963 VFL season at AFL Tables
- 1963 VFL season at Australian Football
