= Guy (surname) =

Guy is a French and English surname. Notable people with the surname include:

- Alain Guy (1924–2009), French philosopher
- Allan Guy (1890–1979), Australian politician
- Allan Ray Guy (1926–2025), Canadian politician
- Amy Guy (born 1983), Welsh athlete and model
- André Guy (born 1941), French footballer
- Athol Guy (born 1940), Australian musician
- Barry Guy (born 1947), British composer
- Basil Guy (disambiguation), multiple people, including:
  - Basil Guy (bishop) (1910–1975), British clergyman
  - Basil Guy (Royal Navy officer) (1882–1956), British naval officer
- Bedford G. Guy (1841–1915), American politician
- Betty Guy (1920–2016), American artist
- Billy Guy (1936–2002), American singer
- Brent Guy (born 1960), American football coach
- Buddy Guy (born 1936), American guitarist
- Buzz Guy (1936–2010), American football player
- Callum Guy (born 1996), English footballer
- Charles Guy (disambiguation), multiple people, including:
  - Charles A. Guy (died 1985), American newspaper owner and editor
  - Charles H. Guy (1924–2010), American football and lacrosse player and coach
  - Charles L. Guy (1856–1930), American politician and judge
- Charlie Guy (1896–1974), American football player
- Dave Guy (born 1978), American trumpeter
- David Guy (1897–1960), American military aviator
- Dennis Guy (1944–2022), Northern Irish footballer
- Derek Guy (born 1979), Canadian-born American fashion writer
- Dick Guy (1937–2018), Australian cricketer
- Dickie Guy (born 1949), English footballer
- Dillon Guy (born 1991), Canadian football player
- Doug Guy (born 1929), Australian rules footballer
- Edna Guy (1907–1982), American dancer
- Edna Guy (artist) (1897–1969), British artist
- Eolyn Klugh Guy (c. 1901–1961), American social worker
- Eric Guy (1886–1946), Australian rules footballer
- Étienne Guy (1774–1820), Canadian surveyor and politician
- Fabrice Guy (born 1968), French skier
- Finley Guy (fl. 1928), American owner of the Finley Guy Building
- Frances Guy (born 1959), British diplomat
- Francis Guy (c. 1760–1820), American painter
- Francis Guy (cyclist) (1885–1947), British cyclist
- François Guy (singer) (1947–2023), Canadian singer, actor and playwright
- François-Frédéric Guy (born 1969), French pianist
- Fred Guy (1897–1971), American banjo player and guitarist
- Gary Guy (born 1952), Australian rules footballer
- Gawain Guy (born 1962), Jamaican runner
- George Guy (disambiguation), multiple people, including:
  - George Guy (footballer) (1896–1975), English footballer
  - George Guy (trade unionist) (1918–2005), British trade unionist
  - George F. Guy (1904–1980), American politician
  - George Omar Guy (died 1927), American grocer, founder of G. O. Guy
- Geoffrey Guy (born 1954), British pharmacologist and businessman
- Geoffrey Colin Guy (1921–2006), British colonial administrator
- Georgia Guy (born 1993), New Zealand cricketer
- Gerard Ambassa Guy (born 1978), Hong Kong footballer
- Gillian Guy, British administrator
- Graham Guy (born 1983), Scottish footballer
- Greg Guy (born 1971), American basketball player
- Gregory Guy (born 1950), American linguist
- Guylaine Guy (1929–2024), Canadian singer and painter
- Hana Guy (born 1969), New Zealand tennis player
- Harold Arthur Guy (1898–1980), British car dealer and politician
- Harrison Guy, American dancer and choreographer
- Harry Guy (1881–1958), Australian rules footballer
- Harry P. Guy (1870–1950), American composer
- Henry Guy (disambiguation), multiple people, including:
  - Henry Guy (politician) (1631–1710), English politician
  - Henry Lewis Guy (1887–1956), British mechanical engineer
- Hervé Guy (born 1984), Ivorian footballer
- Ivor Guy (1924–1986), English footballer
- Jackie Guy, Jamaican dancer
- Jacques Guy (born 1944), French-born Australian linguist
- Jael-Marie Guy (born 2007), Filipino footballer
- James Guy (disambiguation), multiple people, including:
  - James Guy (Australian politician) (1860–1921), Australian politician
  - James Guy (British politician) (1894–1972), Scottish politician
  - James Guy (swimmer) (born 1995), English swimmer
- Jamie Guy (born 1987), English footballer
- Janice Guy (born 1953), British photographer, co-founder of Murray Guy
- Jasmine Guy (born 1962), American actress
- Jean Guy (1922–2013), American first lady
- Jeff Guy (1940–2014), South African historian
- Joanna Guy (born 1991), American model
- Joe Guy (disambiguation), multiple people, including:
  - Joe Guy (cricketer) (1813–1873), English cricketer
  - Joe Guy (musician) (1920–1962), American trumpeter
- Joel and Lisa Guy (died 2016), American murder victims
- John Guy (disambiguation), multiple people, including:
  - John Guy (colonial administrator) (1568–1629), English politician and colonial administrator
  - John Guy (historian) (born 1949), British historian
  - John Guy (English cricketer) (1916–1997), English cricketer
  - John Guy (New Zealand cricketer) (born 1934), New Zealand cricketer
  - John Hudson Guy (fl. 1749), Jamaican judge
- Kevan Guy (born 1965), Canadian ice hockey player
- Kevin Guy (born 1972), American football coach and player
- Kyle Guy (born 1997), American basketball player
- L. Ruth Guy (1913–2006), American pathologist
- Lawrence Guy (born 1990), American football player
- Lewis Guy (born 1985), English footballer
- Louis Guy (1768–1850), Canadian politician
- Louis Guy (American football) (born 1941), American football player
- Madison Guy (born 1994), Northern Irish footballer and internet entrepreneur
- Mark Guy (born 1964), American football player
- Marvin Guy (born 1964), American convict
- Mary E. Guy, American political scientist
- Mathieu Guy (born 1983), French footballer
- Matthew Guy (born 1974), Australian politician
- Maureen Guy (1932–2015), Welsh singer
- Michael Guy (born 1943), British computer scientist and mathematician
- Michelle Guy, Northern Irish politician
- Mila Guy (born 1992), South African actress and costume designer
- Morais Guy, Jamaican politician
- Nancy Guy, American politician
- Nathan Guy (born 1970), New Zealand politician
- Nicholas Guy (fl. 1612–1631), Newfoundland settler
- P. L. O. Guy (1885–1952), British archaeologist
- Phil Guy (1940–2008), American guitarist
- Philip Guy (British Army officer) (1804–1878), British army officer
- Pierre Guy (1931–2025), French sport shooter
- R. Kip Guy, American pharmacologist
- Ralph B. Guy Jr. (1929–2026), American judge
- Randor Guy (1937–2023), Indian film historian
- Ray Guy (1949–2022), American football player
- Ray Guy (humorist) (1939–2013), Canadian journalist and writer
- Raymond Guy (1912–2000), Canadian politician
- Richard Guy (disambiguation), multiple people, including:
  - Richard Guy (footballer) (1877–1938), English footballer
  - Richard K. Guy (1916–2020), British-Canadian mathematician
  - Richard P. Guy (1932–2025), American judge
- Richie Guy (born 1941), New Zealand rugby union player and administrator
- Riki Guy (born 1975), Israeli singer
- Robert Guy (disambiguation), multiple people, including:
  - Robert Guy (athlete) (born 1964), Trinidadian runner
  - Robert Guy (Royal Navy officer), British naval officer
- Robin Guy (1970–2024), English drummer
- Roland Guy (1928–2005), British army officer
- Roma Guy (born 1942), American activist
- Ronald Guy (1912–2005), English sport shooter
- Rosa Guy (1925–2012), American writer
- Ross Guy (born 1975), English Musician
- Ryan Guy (born 1985), American soccer player
- Sara Guy (born 1997), Canadian curler
- Scott Guy (died 2010), New Zealand murder victim
- Seymour Joseph Guy (1824–1910), American painter
- Simon Guy (born 1978), English cricketer
- Steve Guy (born 1959), New Zealand tennis player
- Sylvain Guy, Canadian screenwriter and film director
- Thomas Guy (1644–1724), English politician and hospital benefactor
- Thomas Guy (fl. 1890), American owner of the Thomas Guy House
- TJ Guy (born 2003), American football player
- Tony Guy (born 1959), American basketball player
- Trent Guy (born 1987), American football player
- Vernon Guy (1945–1998), American singer
- Wally Guy (1910–1978), Australian rules footballer
- William Guy (disambiguation), multiple people, including:
  - William Guy (1810–1885), British physician and medical statistician
  - William Guy (dentist) (1859–1950), British dentist
  - William Guy (golfer) (born 1967), Scottish golfer
  - William Henry Guy (1890–1968), British politician
  - William L. Guy (1919–2013), American politician
- Winston Guy (born 1990), American football player

== Compound surname ==
These people have Guy as part of a compound surname:

- Jean Dornal de Guy (1771–1855), French naval officer
- Emma Guy Cromwell (1865–1952), American politician
- Melerson Guy Dunham (1904–1985), American activist and historian
- Maryse Guy Mitsouko (1943–1995), French artist and actress
- Florence Guy Seabury (1881–1951), American journalist and essayist
- Alice Guy-Blaché (1873–1968), French filmmaker
- Donna Guy-Halkyard (born 1961), New Zealand judoka
- Catherine Guy-Quint (born 1949), French politician
- Beverly Guy-Sheftall (born 1946), American scholar
- Marie Guy-Stéphan (1818–1873), French dancer
- Oliver Guy-Watkins (born 1979), British film director and artist
- Denton Guy-Williams (born 1972), Sierra Leonean runner

== See also ==
- Governor Guy (disambiguation)
