= John F. Griffiths =

American meteorologist (1926–2003)

John Frederick Griffiths
- Born: February 8, 1926; London, UK
- Died: June 27, 2003 (aged 77); College Station, Texas, US
- Education: London University: Imperial and King's Colleges (degrees on mathematics, physics, meteorology, theology and statistics)
- Occupations: Bioclimatologist in the British Overseas Scientific Civil Service; professor of Meteorology at Texas A&M; Dean of the Meteorological Program with the Organization for Tropical Studies; the first Texas State Climatologist; the President of The American Association of State Climatologists; chief consultant to the United States agencies
- Years active: 1950 – 1999
- Organizations: World Meteorological Organization; East African Veterinary Research Organization; Organization for Tropical Studies; Food and Agriculture Organization
- Known for: Professor Emeritus of Meteorology and professor for multiple other disciplines in Texas A&M University; First Texas State Climatologist in 15 years; A chief consultant in regard to climate for many United States agencies
- Notable work: One Hundred Years of Texas Weather; The History of Kent Cricket, 1946 – 1963
- Spouse: Margaret Joan Baron Griffiths (married 1962 – 2003)
- Awards: Drew Gold Medal for Mathematics; Texas A&M’s Distinguished Achievement in Teaching Award

John Frederick Griffiths (8 February 1926 – 27 July 2003) was a Professor of Meteorology (as well as of agricultural climatology, architectural climatology and numerous other fields) at Texas A&M University and with the Organization for Tropical Studies. He was the first Texas State Climatologist and served as President of the American Association of State Climatologists from 1984 to 1985. His work was printed in a variety of publications, and he was frequently interviewed for his expertise on natural disasters and climate change. Later in his career, he was a chief consultant to many United States agencies, including the World Meteorological Organization and the U.S. Agencies for International Development. As a reminder of Griffiths' achievements and an inspiration to future generations of meteorologists, Texas A&M offers a scholarship in his name.

== Early life and education ==
Griffiths was born on February 8, 1926, in London, England. As a teenager, he survived the London Blitz during World War II. He studied at the London University, (Imperial, and King's Colleges), earning several degrees in mathematics, physics, meteorology, theology and statistics. Griffiths specialized in applied meteorology and climatology, and was known internationally as an expert on the connection between climate and agriculture.

== Career ==
=== First positions ===
After graduation from the London University, Griffiths became a bioclimatologist in the British Overseas Scientific Civil Service. His first projects gave him the opportunity to visit Ethiopia, Somalia, Saudi Arabia and East Africa. From 1950 to 1956, he worked for the British Colonial Scientific Service with the Desert Locust Survey.

From 1956 – 1958, he served as bioclimatologist with the East African Veterinary Research Organization. Then the East African Meteorological Department in Nairobi, Kenya, hired him as Principal Scientific Officer, and he managed its Research Section until 1962. Later in his career, Griffiths was asked to be the Hearne Rotary speaker on J.J. Yarka Vondracek's program to have a conversation on the history and the present of East Africa.

=== Texas A&M University (1960 – 1999) ===
In 1960, Griffiths won a Rockefeller and a Munitalp grant that allowed him to travel to and around the U.S. for the first time. He stayed at Texas A&M University for six or seven weeks, learning about the university and its culture. In 1962, Griffiths and his wife moved to College Station, Texas, where he became a Texas A&M Professor of Meteorology and helped develop an atmospheric sciences program that emerged as an international leader in the field. According to a university colleague, Professor David Woodcock, Griffiths "loved teaching, was very popular with his students and maintained an extraordinary connection with many of them."

Griffiths was the principal investigator for an A&M Research Foundation project to study the pollution over Houston in 1967. The data was used to improve a unique mathematical model that helps research gaseous materials by factoring in weather conditions, nature, materials and topography. The study continued into 1970 with the help of a Public Health Service grant.

As a professor, Griffiths also worked closely with U.S. and Latin American students in cooperation with the Organization for Tropical Studies, where he was Dean of the Meteorological Program. The program focused on locations in Central and South America. In 1969, Griffiths organized an eight semester-hour credit course that took place at the University of Costa Rica in Colombia to study atmospheric energy budgets.

In 1974 – 1975, Griffiths was chosen to be Texas A&M's University Lecturer. His topic was "The Climate is Changing." He was an early voice on the subject of climate change, climate warming, and how cities and fuel consumption impact long-term temperatures.

As an A&M professor, Griffiths taught ten different courses, including tropical meteorology, agricultural climatology, architectural climatology, and statistics. He supervised 67 masters’ theses and 13 doctoral dissertations. He retired from A&M in 1999 as a Professor Emeritus.

=== Activity as the Texas State Climatologist ===
In 1973, John Griffiths was named the first Texas State Climatologist and opened an office in the College of Geosciences. He was the only person to occupy the position since the federal government closed it 15 years prior. He spoke very highly of his position and its responsibilities: tracking the weather of the entire state of Texas, conveying it to people, and predicting what it would be like years and centuries ahead. Under Griffiths' command, the Office of Texas State Climatologist became known as a place anyone could visit or call to find out any climatological data for Texas.

During 1984 – 1985, Griffiths served as the President of the American Association of State Climatologists.

In an article published in 1988, Griffiths disagreed with fellow scientist James Hansen on the greenhouse effect as a cause for Earth's climate shift. Though skeptical about the greenhouse effect, Griffiths spoke out in support of limiting fossil fuel use, linking it to increased pollution in Texas. He actively debated climate warming, and the efficiency of models predicting such warming (such as the error in General Circulation Models of using single point estimates to represent large areas of the world, especially in Africa and South America).

In another article, Griffiths shared his knowledge and opinion on modern droughts in Texas. He studied 30 years of Texas climate records and claimed the worst drought took place in 1950.

=== Other activity, positions and honors ===
In 1963, Griffiths visited France to chair a group concerned with meteorological instrumentation. He presented two papers at the Third Congress of the International Society of Biometeorology in Pau, France.

In 1965, Griffiths was elected the chapter chairman of the American Meteorological Society's Texas local unit, defeating his colleague Walter K. Henry.

During his career, Griffiths was a chief consultant to many United States agencies, including the World Meteorological Organization, the Food and Agriculture Organization, and the U.S. Agencies for International Development, which involved partnership with the governments of Greece, Spain, India, Kenya, Senegal, Mali and Mauritania. He worked as an affiliate with the National Climate Data Center in Asheville, N.C. as Principal Investigator, quality-controlling global climate databases.

Griffiths was named a Fellow of the Royal Meteorological, the Royal Geographical and the Royal Astronomical Societies, as well as Sigma Xi and Phil Kappa Phil. He was also a member of the World Academy of Art and Science.

=== Notable publications ===
Alongside his contributions to research and academia, Griffiths published and edited, 12 books, authored more than 100 scientific articles, and edited selected issues of meteorological journals.

With the help of a former student and State Climatologist Office researchers, Griffiths authored a publication called "One Hundred Years of Texas Weather," which contained data, labels and maps to track Texas weather extremes.

In 2000, following the 100th anniversary of the nation's deadliest hurricane in Galveston, Texas Griffiths published an overview of local natural disasters and their consequences. He analyzed their causes and offered recommendations on how to prepare both the environment and the public for natural disasters.

As a member and historian for the Kent County Cricket Club, Griffiths published a number of volumes and special editions on the club's history.

Griffiths is perhaps best known for his 1966 book Applied Climatology, in which he introduced a new climate classification scheme, among its features being the use of 6 °C in the coldest month as the poleward limit of subtropical climates (this line following closely the poleward limit of where the hardiest palm trees can survive, and also the fact that 6 °C is the point colder than which photosynthesis becomes impossible), and placing dry climates — arid and semiarid — on the same thermal continuum as other climates, using a separate letter to denote these respective climates (F was used for all dry climates in the original scheme, but X and Z have been used to denote semiarid and arid climates, respectively, in the updated scheme).

The rules of the Griffiths scheme are as follows:

Temperature

A (tropical) climates: All 12 months with mean monthly temperatures of 18 °C or above

B (subtropical) climates: One or more months with mean monthly temperatures below 18 °C, but all 12 months with mean monthly temperatures of 6 °C or above

C (short winter) climates: 7 to 11 months with mean monthly temperatures of 6 °C or above

D (long winter) climates: 3 to 6 months with mean monthly temperatures of 6 °C or above

E (tundra) climates: Less than 3 months with mean monthly temperatures of 6 °C or above, but at least one monthly mean above 0 °C. While it is mathematically possible for the warmest month in this climate to average 10 °C or above, it is extremely rare for trees to be found therein, as per Otto Nordenskjöld's formula of W = 9 - 0.1C, with W denoting the warmest monthly mean temperature and C denoting the coldest monthly mean temperature, both in °C — the best examples can be found in locations along the Hudson Bay coast of Nunavut, which are treeless despite having a warmest month above 10 °C

F (ice cap) climates: All 12 months with mean monthly temperatures of 0 °C or below

Seasonality of Precipitation

"A" climates only

A1 (essentially analogous to Af under the Köppen climate classification scheme): 10 or more months with mean monthly precipitation of 50 mm or above (not 60 mm as in the Köppen scheme)

A2 (essentially analogous to Am in the Köppen scheme): 7–9 months with mean monthly precipitation of 50 mm or above

A3 (essentially analogous to Aw or As in the Köppen scheme): 6 months or less with mean monthly precipitation of 50 mm or above, but not meeting the standards for designation as a semiarid or arid climate — the original formula for determining aridity was R = 160 + 0.9T, with R denoting mean annual precipitation in mm and T the mean annual temperature in °C; however, due to this formula's lack of differentiation between semiarid and arid climates, use of either the Köppen or the Trewartha scheme for fixing the aridity thresholds has become customary.

All other climates

U (uniform precipitation): The three consecutive wettest months do not receive twice as much precipitation as the three consecutive driest months

S (summer precipitation): The three consecutive wettest months receive more than twice as much precipitation as the three consecutive driest months, and the second of the three consecutive wettest months occurs in the high-sun season (April through September in the Northern Hemisphere, or October through March in the Southern Hemisphere). This is seen most commonly in the monsoon regions of southern and eastern Asia, and in the landmass interiors of Asia and North America

W (winter precipitation — colloquially referred to as the Mediterranean climate, even though it can extend as far north as Provideniya, Russia: The three consecutive wettest months receive more than twice as much precipitation as the three consecutive driest months, and the second of the three consecutive wettest months occurs in the low-sun season (October through March in the Northern Hemisphere, or April through October in the Southern Hemisphere)

Under the original scheme, V for "vernal" (denoting spring maximum precipitation) and A for "autumn" (denoting autumn maximum precipitation) also existed, but these designations have largely fallen out of use.

== Personal life ==
Working on an experimental atmospheric project in Kenya, Griffiths met his future wife, Margaret Joan Baron. In 1962, the couple got married in Londonand moved to College Station, Texas, where Griffiths became a Professor of Meteorology at Texas A&M University.

The Griffiths lived in College Station for over fifty years, during which they decided to become U.S. citizens. In spite of that, they never lost their British accent, manners, or values, such as serving high tea or celebrating Boxing Day. In the front garden of their house, Griffiths installed an imported English mail box that was nearly 100 years old.

Griffiths died of heart disease on July 27, 2003, in College Station, Texas. After his passing, Griffiths' wife, Joan, founded a scholarship endowment to honor him. To this day it supports many students with a passion for meteorology.

=== Extracurricular interests ===
From a young age, Griffiths had interest in live theater, concerts and films. Later, he started enjoying classical music and had an extensive library. He was an experienced collector, with collections of model trams, rare coins, stamps and more.

Griffiths' wife, Joan, shared her husband's interest in art, music and literature and was a President of TAMU Fine Arts Group.

Being fond of cricket, Griffiths helped Texas A&M found their first cricket team, was their captain and coach, elected several times, and was the president of the Texas A&M University Cricket Club. In 1966, under Griffiths' precise leadership, the team's first international match occurred; they went to Mexico City and beat Mexico City Sunday.

== Awards ==
The London University awarded the Drew Gold Medal for Mathematics to Griffiths for distinguished student achievements.

In 1990, John Griffiths was given the Texas A&M’s Distinguished Achievement in Teaching Award.

== See also ==
- Texas A&M University
- College Station, Texas
- Organization for Tropical Studies
- Kent County Cricket Club
- Greenhouse effect
- Royal Meteorological Society

== Literature cited ==
- Stewart Jr., Robert Chisem, ed. (30 June 1963), "Dateline: College station", The Eagle, Bryan: Eagle Printing Company, p. 18, ISSN 2333-6323, LCCN sn86088792, OCLC 14171566
- "J. F. Griffiths rotary speaker February 13", The Hearne Democrat, vol. 73, no. 50, Hearne: J. Felton Lane, p. 1, 7 February 1964, OCLC 14265209
- Stewart Jr., Robert Chisem, ed. (17 January 1965), "Griffiths named Society Chief", The Eagle, Bryan: Eagle Printing Company, p. 10, ISSN 2333-6323, LCCN sn86088792, OCLC 14171566
- Stewart Jr., Robert Chisem, ed. (17 April 1966), "Cricket Club downs Mexico", The Eagle, Bryan: Eagle Printing Company, p. 13, ISSN 2333-6323, LCCN sn86088792, OCLC 14171566
- Stewart Jr., Robert Chisem, ed. (2 August 1966), "J. F. Griffiths heads cricket", The Eagle, vol. 91, Bryan: Eagle Printing Company, p. 2, ISSN 2333-6323, LCCN sn86088792, OCLC 14171566
- Stewart Jr., Robert Chisem, ed. (14 July 1968), "A&M to study pollution", The Eagle, Bryan: Eagle Printing Company, p. 5, ISSN 2333-6323, LCCN sn86088792, OCLC 14171566
- "Aggies plan air study", Austin American-Statesman, Austin: H. H. Sevier, p. 29, 7 July 1969, ISSN 2473-5450, LCCN sn83026380, OCLC 9946647
- Waggone, Jerry Wayne, ed. (1 December 1969), "Prof to take class south of border", The Eagle, Bryan: Eagle Printing Company, p. 2, LCCN sn88083746, OCLC 18092047
- Waggone, Jerry Wayne, ed. (20 May 1970), "English letter box", The Eagle, vol. 94, no. 254, Bryan: Eagle Printing Company, p. 1, LCCN sn88083746, OCLC 18092047
- Waggone, Jerry Wayne, ed. (5 November 1971), "TAMU Fine Arts Group", The Eagle, Bryan: Eagle Printing Company, p. 29, LCCN sn88083746, OCLC 18092047
- "Texas weather like England's", The Victoria Advocate, Victoria: Victoria Advocate Publishing Company, pp. 6D, 11 October 1973, OCLC 247434350
- Waggone, Jerry Wayne, ed. (28 November 1974), "Griffiths named series lecturer", The Eagle, Bryan: Eagle Printing Company, pp. 2E, OCLC 14109076
- Waggone, Jerry Wayne, ed. (4 December 1974), "Prof estimates one degree drop would up consumption", The Eagle, Bryan: Eagle Printing Company, pp. 2A, OCLC 14109076
- "Book tells freaky Texas weather facts", The Kilgore News Herald, Kilgore: Charles K. Devall, p. 16, 5 May 1982, OCLC 14369436
- "Griffiths is state's top weather expert", Longview News-Journal, Atlanta: Cox Media Group, p. 47, 27 March 1988, OCLC 859412005
- "Texas State 'Weatherman' thrives on diversity", The Tyler Courier-Times, Tyler: Courier-Times Publishing Company, p. 5, 28 March 1988, OCLC 1007402408
- "Think this is dry? You oughta been in Valley back in '50's", The Monitor, McAllen: Garland Buck, pp. 10B, 24 July 1988, OCLC 14375474
- "Latest weather information only a telephone call away", Galveston Daily News, Houston: W. Richardson, pp. 14–A, 31 December 1988, ISSN 0738-8047, LCCN sn83008047, OCLC 9690957
- "Preventing disasters a shared responsibility", Austin American-Statesman, Austin: H. H. Sevier, pp. J3, 3 September 2000, ISSN 2473-5752, LCCN sn87090670, OCLC 33201136
- Benson, Darren, ed. (3 August 2003), "August: John F. Griffiths", Bryan-College Station Eagle, Omaha: Berkshire Hathaway
- Benson, Darren, ed. (18 February 2015), "Griffiths, Margaret Joan", Bryan-College Station Eagle, Omaha: Berkshire Hathaway
- Driscoll, Dennis M. (1 January 2004), "Obituary: John Frederick Griffiths", Weather, 59 (1), Hoboken: John Wiley and Sons: 27, Bibcode:2004Wthr...59...27D, doi:10.1256/wea.173.03, LCCN 49000693, OCLC 1769533
- Ford, Robert F. (12 October 1973), Guy, Charles A. (ed.), "Briton 'Messing around with Texas Weather'", Lubbock Avalanche-Journal, vol. 51, no. 296, Lubbock: Charles A. Guy, p. 1, LCCN sn86088060, OCLC 13990498
- Lang, Andy (25 October 1964), "On the house", Austin American-Statesman, Austin: H. H. Sevier, pp. C16, ISSN 2473-5752, LCCN sn87090670, OCLC 33201136
- Martin, Dorian (7 March 2018), Bayliss, Karissa (ed.), "Forecasting the Future", Spirit, College Station: Texas A&M University
- Stanley, Dick (25 June 1988), "Greenhouse effect not weather culprit, expert says", Austin American-Statesman, Austin: H. H. Sevier, p. 21, ISSN 2473-5752, LCCN sn87090670, OCLC 33201136
- Stanley, Dick (18 June 1989), "Scientist backs limit on fuel use", Austin American-Statesman, Austin: H. H. Sevier, p. 16, ISSN 2473-5752, LCCN sn87090670, OCLC 33201136
