= Carrum Football Club =

Australian rules football club

Carrum-Patterson Lakes

Names
- Full name: Carrum Patterson Lakes Football Club
- Former name(s): Carrum Football Club,
- Nickname(s): "Carrum", "The Lions", "Carrum-Pat"
- Club song: "You're a Grand Old Flag"
- Leading goalkicker: Alex Wilson

Club details
- Founded: 1909, 2013
- Dissolved: 1996
- Colours: Maroon and Blue with White Monogram
- Competition: Southern Football League
- President: Mark Bollen
- Coach: Rohan Bleeker
- Captain(s): Alex Wilson, Dane Leyden
- Premierships: 1921, 1932, 1948, 1955, 1959, 1963, 1966, 1973, 1974, 1974, 1989, 1994
- Ground(s): Roy Dore Reserve
- Former ground(s): Keast Park

Other information
- Official website: http://www.cplfc.com.au/index.aspx

The Carrum-Patterson Lakes Football Club is an Australian rules football club from Melbourne, that was founded in 1909 and currently plays in Division 3 of the Southern Football League.

== History ==
Football has been reported to be played in Carrum since as early as 1902. Between 1902 and 1908 it has been well reported that a 'Carrum Football Club' played pre-season matches against the likes of Frankston Football Club and Mornington Football Club but never competed in an organised competition.

A news article from the Mornington Standard in 1909 reported the formation of the 'Carrum Football Club' with R. W. Jones elected as President and M. McCauley and A. Rigby as Vice-Presidents. Despite forming a club in 1909 and playing one-off matches they would not compete in regular competition until 1911.

Carrum Football Club first competed in the Federal Football Association as Carrum-Chelsea Football Club in 1911, competing against Moorabbin, Cheltenham and Victoria Brewery. In 1912 the club did not compete but would return in 1913 and 1914 again re-amalgamated as Carrum-Chelsea. In 1914, Carrum would finish 5th on the ladder at the end of what would be their last season until after World War I.

In 1919 following the end of the Great War, Chelsea broke away from the Carrum Football Club and formed their own 'Chelsea Football Club'. Carrum Football Club now competed as a stand-alone club in the Federal Football Association.

Carrum played a short stint between 1919 and 1921 in the Mornington Peninsula Football Association. It was during this time that Carrum won their first Senior Premiership in 1921, they then returned to the Federal FA the next year. In 1928 the club underwent some financial hardship and disbanded until 1932. They reformed and joined the Peninsula District Football Association where they won their second premiership in 1932 in their return season. In 1933, Carrum came runners up to Rosebud and at the end of the 1933 season the Peninsula District FA merged with the Peninsula FA to form the Mornington Peninsula Football League.

In 1936 the club disbanded again and the players joined neighboring clubs, particularly Seaford. Due to constant pressure from the old Carrum players and limited players in both Seaford and Carrum towns, they decided to combine and entered the Mornington Peninsula Football League as Seaford/Carrum Football Club. The combined Seaford/Carrum side would compete together until 1940. During those 4 seasons the team lost 51 games and only won 2.

In 1941 Carrum went stand-alone again competing in a social league but achieving little success. Carrum would soon return to the MPFL and shortly after won the MPFL B-Grade Premiership in 1948 and again in 1955. Following this Carrum entered a rebuilding stage and yielded little success until 1959 when great efforts were made to match the strength of sides such as Hastings, Frankston and Crib Point. It paid off with the 1959 premiership, defeating Hastings by just 1 point.

In the late 1960s the club song was changed to It's a Grand Old Flag, as used by the Melbourne Demons in the Australian Football League.

Carrum would dominate the Mornington Peninsula Football League for a period in the 1970s. Under coach Ivan Guy, from midway through 1973 to early 1975 they were undefeated in 35 matches, winning the 1973 and 1974 premierships. Carrum also made the competition grand final in 1972 and again in 1975, losing both to rivals Hastings. 1974 premiership captain Gary Guy made the move to the VFL in 1975, eventually playing 22 matches for the Melbourne Football Club.

Carrum Lions would then stay in the MPFL until 1987, when the Mornington Peninsula Football League merged with the Nepean Football League to form the league now knows as the MPNFL. The MPNFL was where Carrum won their final flag as the 2nd Division Premiers in 1994.

The club disbanded at the end of the 1995 season, but reformed 18 years later as the Carrum Paterson Lakes Football Club, joining the Southern Football Netball League (SFNL) in 2013. As of 2023, the club plays in Division 3 of the SFNL.

== Home Grounds ==
- 1911 - Rigby's Land - now known as Stanley St.
- 1912 - Carrum Primary School oval
- 1913-1914 - Forsyth's Property, bottom end of Breeze St.
- 1921 - Priestley's Paddock, McLeod Rd, Carrum.
- 1922-1954 - Keast Park - Nepean Highway, current site of Carrum Bowls Club.
- 1955–Present - Roy Dore Reserve (Graham Road Reserve)

The Graham Road Reserve was renamed the Roy Dore Reserve in 1985 in honor of long time Carrum CFA Captain and Carrum FC President, player and coach Roy Dore.

== Club Colours and Guernsey ==
- 1911 - No Record
- 1913-1914 - Blue with Gold Band (Carrum/Chelsea)
- 1921 - Navy Blue with Royal Blue Band
- 1922-1927 - Gold Jumper with Blue Band
- 1932-1935 - Blue Jumper with Gold V
- 1937-1940 - Black with Gold Sash (Seaford/Carrum)
- 1941-1945 - Brown with Gold Band
- 1946-1948 - Gold Jumper with Blue V
- 1949-1954 - Blue Jumper with Yellow V
- 1955-1956 - Yellow Jumper with Blue Band
- 1957-1962

For a short period of time between 1957 and 1962 Carrum Football Club wore blue and gold hoops similar to the Geelong jumper. In 1961 the Bonbeach Football Club was formed and Carrum FC donated these blue and gold hooped guernseys to Bonbeach FC for them to wear in their inaugural season.

- 1963 and 1969

Now known as the "Carrum Lions", the club's colours were blue and gold; A blue jumper with a gold yolk.

- 1970-1980

The club changed its colours to the Maroon and Blue. The playing Guernsey mirrored Fitzroy's in the VFL being a Maroon Guernsey with a blue yolk and a gold Lion emblem located on the left breast of the Jersey. This was also when Carrum began wearing the now infamous white CFC monogram on the centre.

- 1980s - 1996

In Carrum's final years between their Guernsey changed from the dark maroon and blue yolk to red and royal blue yolk and a white monogram. Again, mirroring the Fitzroy Lions of the VFL who changed their Guernsey colours due to the popularity of colour television.

Reforming in 2013, as a tribute to over 100 years of football in the Carrum community the current playing Guernsey pays homage to the Guernsey worn when the Carrum Football Club won back to back MPFL premierships in 1973 and 1974.

== Premierships and Grand Final Appearances ==
In all, Carrum Patterson Lakes Football Club has won 12 premierships and finished runners up 12 times.

- 1921 1st XVIII Premiers - Carrum 7.17.59 d Hastings 7.4.46 - Played at Somerville
- 1932 1st XVIII Premiers - Carrum d Rosebud - Played at Dromana
- 1933 1st XVIII Runners Up - Rosebud 8.12.60 d Carrum 5.10.40 - Played at Dromana
- 1948 1st XVIII Premiers - Carrum 17.7.109 d Rye 14.14.98 - Played at Mornington
- 1955 1st XVIII Premiers - Carrum 6.13.49 d Rye 4.10.34 - Played at Dromana
- 1959 1st XVIII Premiers - Carrum 11.14.80 d Hastings 12.7.79 - Played at Mornington
- 1961 1st XVIII Runners Up - Frankston 12.15.87 d Carrum 9.14.68 - Played at Mornington
- 1963 2nd XVIII Premiers
- 1965 1st XVIII Runners Up - Edithvale Aspendale 11.6.72 d Carrum 8.13.61 - Played at Mornington
- 1966 3rd XVIII Premiers
- 1966 2nd XVIII Runners Up
- 1967 1st XVIII Runners Up - Chelsea 20.18.138 d Carrum 11.21.87 - Played at Mornington
- 1968 2nd XVIII Runners Up
- 1973 1st XVIII Premiers - Carrum 12.14.86 d Hastings 4.17.41 - Played at Mornington
- 1974 1st XVIII Premiers - Carrum 11.17.83 d Mornington 11.13.79 - Played at Mornington
- 1974 2nd XVIII Premiers
- 1974 3rd XVIII Runners Up
- 1975 1st XVIII Runners Up - Hastings 18.19.127 d Carrum 10.13.73 - Played at Mornington
- 1976 3rd XVIII Runners Up
- 1989 2nd XVIII Premiers
- 1992 2nd XVIII Premiers
- 1993 1st XVIII Runners Up - Langwarrin 14.13.97 d Carrum 15.6.96 - Played at Frankston
- 1994 1st XVIII Premiers - Carrum 15.8.98 d Rosebud 13.8.86 - Played at Frankston
- 2013 2nd XVIII Runners Up - Doveton Eagles 11.15.81 d Carrum PL 7.5.47 - Played at Cheltenham
- 2013 1st XVIII Runners Up - Doveton Eagles 14.11.95 d Carrum PL 7.14.56 - Played at Cheltenham

== League Best and Fairests ==
=== 1st XVIII ===
- 1958 - W. Stevens
- 1965 - W. I'Anson
- 1965 - R. Stubbs
- 1983 - H. Felmingham
- 2018 - P.Mauracher
- 2021 - R.Bleeker & A.Wilson

=== 2nd XVIII ===
- 1959 - L. Wangman
- 1961 - J. Jelley

=== U18s/17s ===
- 1969 - Gary Guy
- 1976 - Robbie Laing
- 1982 - Wayne Norrish
- 2019 - Colby Nayna

=== U16s/15s ===
- 1965 - Peter Briggs
- 1969 - Mick Collier
- 1971 - Glenn Heath
- 1983 - Jeff Lord
- 2006 - Mitchell Dicker
- 2008 - Nathan James
- 2010 - Andrew McCormack
- 2018 - Colby Nayna

== AFL / VFL Recruits from Carrum ==
- Darcey Murphey
- Jake Buzza (Port Adelaide)
- Barry Colliver - Essendon
- Syd Hogg - South Melbourne
- Bill Stevens - Fitzroy
- Llew Owens - South Melbourne, Fitzroy
- Ron Stubbs - Hawthorn Football Club (All-Australian)
- Eric Guy - St Kilda Football Club (Player and Coach)
- Wally Guy - North Melbourne
- Wally Hillis - Richmond
- Robert McKenzie - Melbourne
- Gary Guy - Melbourne
