= Charles Guy =

Charles Guy may refer to:

- Charles A. Guy (died 1985), American newspaper owner and editor
- Charles H. Guy (1924–2010), American football and lacrosse player and coach
- Charles L. Guy (1856–1930), American lawyer and politician from New York
- Charlie Guy (1896–1974), American football player

== See also ==
- Guy (surname)
- Charles Guy Briggle (1883–1972), United States district judge
- Charles Guy Parsloe (1900–1985), British historian, writer and Liberal Party politician
