= Colliver =

Colliver is a surname. Notable people with the surname include:

- Barry Colliver (born 1935), Australian rules footballer
- Horace Stanley Colliver (1874–1957), Canadian businessman and politician

== See also ==
- Collier (surname)
