= William Guy (disambiguation) =

William Guy (1810–1885) was a British physician and medical statistician.

William Guy may also refer to:

- William Guy (dentist) (1859–1950), British pioneer of modern dentistry
- William Guy (golfer) (born 1966), Scottish professional golfer
- William Henry Guy (1890–1968), British Labour Party politician
- William L. Guy (1919–2013), governor of the U.S. state of North Dakota
- William Ray Guy or Ray Guy (1949–2022), American football player
