= John Guy =

John Guy may refer to:

- John Guy (New Zealand cricketer) (born 1934), played 12 Test matches for New Zealand 1955–61
- John Guy (English cricketer) (1916–1997), English cricketer who played first-class cricket for Oxford University, Kent and Warwickshire
- John Guy (colonial administrator) (1568–1629), coloniser of Newfoundland
- John Guy (historian) (born 1949), British historian of Tudor England
- John Hudson Guy, Chief Justice of Jamaica in 1749
