= Robert Guy =

Robert Guy may refer to:

- Robert Guy (Welsh Musician)
- Robert Guy (Royal Navy officer)
- Robert Guy (athlete) (born 1964), retired athlete from Trinidad and Tobago
