= Richard Guy (disambiguation) =

Richard K. Guy (1916–2020) was a British mathematician.

Richard Guy may also refer to:

- Richard Guy (footballer) (1880–1938), English footballer
- Richard P. Guy (1932–2025), American judge
- Dick Guy (1937–2018), Australian cricketer
- Richie Guy (born 1941), New Zealand rugby player and administrator
- Dickie Guy (Richard John Guy, born 1949), English football goalkeeper

== See also ==
- Guy A. Richard (born 1932), Canadian lawyer
- Guy Richards (born 1983), Australian rules footballer
