= Henry Guy =

Henry Guy may refer to:

- Henry Lewis Guy (1887–1956), British mechanical engineer
- Henry Guy (politician) (1631–1710), English politician

== See also ==
- Harry Guy (1881–1960), Australian rules footballer
- Harry P. Guy (1870–1950), African American ragtime composer
- Guy Henry (disambiguation)
