= Eric Guy =

Australian rules footballer

Personal information
- Full name: Eric Arthur Guy
- Born: 18 August 1932
- Died: 3 May 1991 (aged 58); Tynong, Victoria
- Original team: Carrum (MPFL)
- Height: 183 cm (6 ft 0 in)
- Weight: 91 kg (201 lb)

Playing career^{1}
Years	Club	Games (Goals)
1957–1962	St Kilda	93 (0)

Coaching career
Years	Club	Games (W–L–D)
1972, 1974	St Kilda	6 (3–3–0)
- ^{1} Playing statistics correct to the end of 1962.

Eric Arthur Guy (18 August 1932 – 3 May 1991) was an Australian rules footballer who played with St Kilda in the VFL.

== Family ==
The youngest of the nine children of Willie Guy (1886-1946), and Ruby May Guy (1889-1960), née Sawyer, Eric Arthur Guy was born on 18 August 1932.

His older brother, Wally Guy, played VFL football for the North Melbourne Football Club, and his nephew, Gary Guy played VFL football for the North Melbourne Football Club.

== Football ==
=== Dromana (MPFL) ===
As a teenager, Guy played 26 games for the Dromana Football Club in the Mornington Peninsula Football League.

=== Carrum (MPFL) ===
He transferred to the Carrum Football Club, also in the MPFL.

=== Oakleigh (VFA) ===
He started his top level senior career at the Oakleigh Football Club in the Victorian Football Association in 1952. In a controversial start to his career at Oakleigh, both Guy and his Carrum teammate Bill Botten played the opening match of the 1952 season before their transfer paperwork had been formally lodged, which resulted in the match, which Oakleigh had won by ten goals, being forfeited to Brunswick.

Guy played 91 senior games for the club over five years.

=== St Kilda (VFL) ===
Guy did enough to catch the eye of St Kilda and they recruited him for the 1957 season. A tough and fearless half back flanker, he served as vice-captain at St Kilda for three of his six seasons, as well as representing Victoria in interstate football.

=== Longwarry (EDFL) ===
He led Longwarry to a premiership in 1968 in the Ellinbank & District Football League (they beat Nar Nar Goon). The side include a young schoolboy named Peter Knights who would become a Hawthorn champion.

=== St Kilda (VFL) ===
After retiring as a player Guy returned to St Kilda as an assistant to coach Allan Jeans. He stepped in to coach when Jeans was away on state duties in 1972 and later when Jeans was ill in 1974. Guy coached St. Kilda in six games for three wins.

== Death ==
He died in Tynong, Victoria on 3 May 1991.
