= Jerusalem Academy of Music and Dance =

School of music and performing arts in Jerusalem, Israel

Coordinates: 31°46.600′N 35°11.694′E

The Jerusalem Academy of Music and Dance
- האקדמיה למוסיקה ולמחול בירושלים
- Former name: The Rubin Academy of Music
- Established: 1933
- Academic staff: 160
- Students: 600
- Location: Jerusalem
- Campus: Givat Ram campus of the Hebrew University of Jerusalem
- Nickname: JAMD
- Website: jamd.ac.il

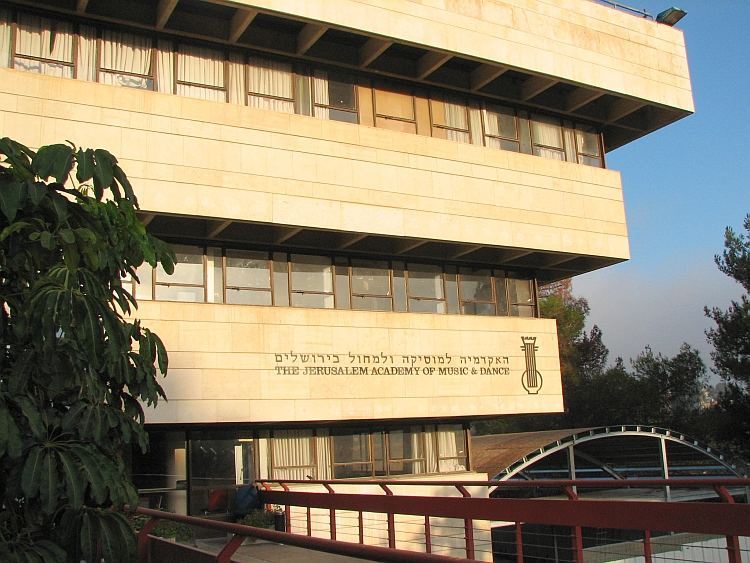
Jerusalem Academy of Music and Dance, Givat Ram, Jerusalem

The Jerusalem Academy of Music and Dance (Hebrew: האקדמיה למוסיקה ולמחול בירושלים), is a school for the music and the performing arts in Jerusalem. It is located on the Givat Ram campus of the Hebrew University of Jerusalem.

== History ==
The Jerusalem Conservatory of Music was founded in August 1933 by violinist Emil Hauser, who served as its first director. His wife, Helena Kagan, a pioneer of pediatric medicine in pre-state Israel, was honorary secretary in 1938–1946. The principal of the school was Yocheved Dostorevsky, a pianist who immigrated to Jerusalem from Vienna. Israeli composer Josef Tal headed the academy in 1948–52. Classes were held at a building on the corner of Kikar Zion in the center of Jerusalem. As the number of students rose, the school moved to rented premises, the Schmidt building, on Hillel Street.

In 1958, Samuel Rubin, president of the Norman Foundation (now the America-Israel Cultural Foundation), donated a large sum of money to purchase a building on Smolenskin Street in Jerusalem's Rehavia neighborhood. The inauguration took place in the presence of Golda Meir, Teddy Kollek and other dignitaries. At the ceremony, the school was renamed the Rubin Academy of Music in Jerusalem.

That same year, the Academy library was established under the leadership of Claude Abravanel. During his 35 years as director, the library collected books, journals, scores, first editions and the like. The collection now resides in the Academy's library and in the Israeli music archives, founded in 1988.

Edith Gerson-Kiwi, an ethnomusicologist specializing in the ethnic music of the oriental Jewish communities of Palestine and Israel, taught music history there in 1942. With the encouragement of Emil Hauser, she established the Phonograph Archives of the Palestine Institute of Folklore and Ethnology and the academy's collection of ethnic musical instruments.

In 1965, Hassia Levy-Agron, a pioneer of dance in Israel, established the school's dance department. Israeli conductor Mendi Rodan headed the school from 1984–93.

== Degrees ==
Today the school has a faculty of 160, and over 600 students. The academy is an independent institution recognized by the Council for Higher Education in Israel, but also collaborates with the Hebrew University of Jerusalem. The school has a Faculty of the Performing Arts, a Faculty of Composition, Conducting and Music Education, and a Faculty of Dance, Movement and Movement Notation.

- Bachelor of Music (B. Mus.).
- Bachelor of Education in Music (B. Ed. Mus.).
- Bachelor of Dance (B. Dance) in conjunction with the Hebrew University of Jerusalem.
- Master of Arts in Music (M. A. Mus.) in conjunction with the Hebrew University of Jerusalem.

== High school ==
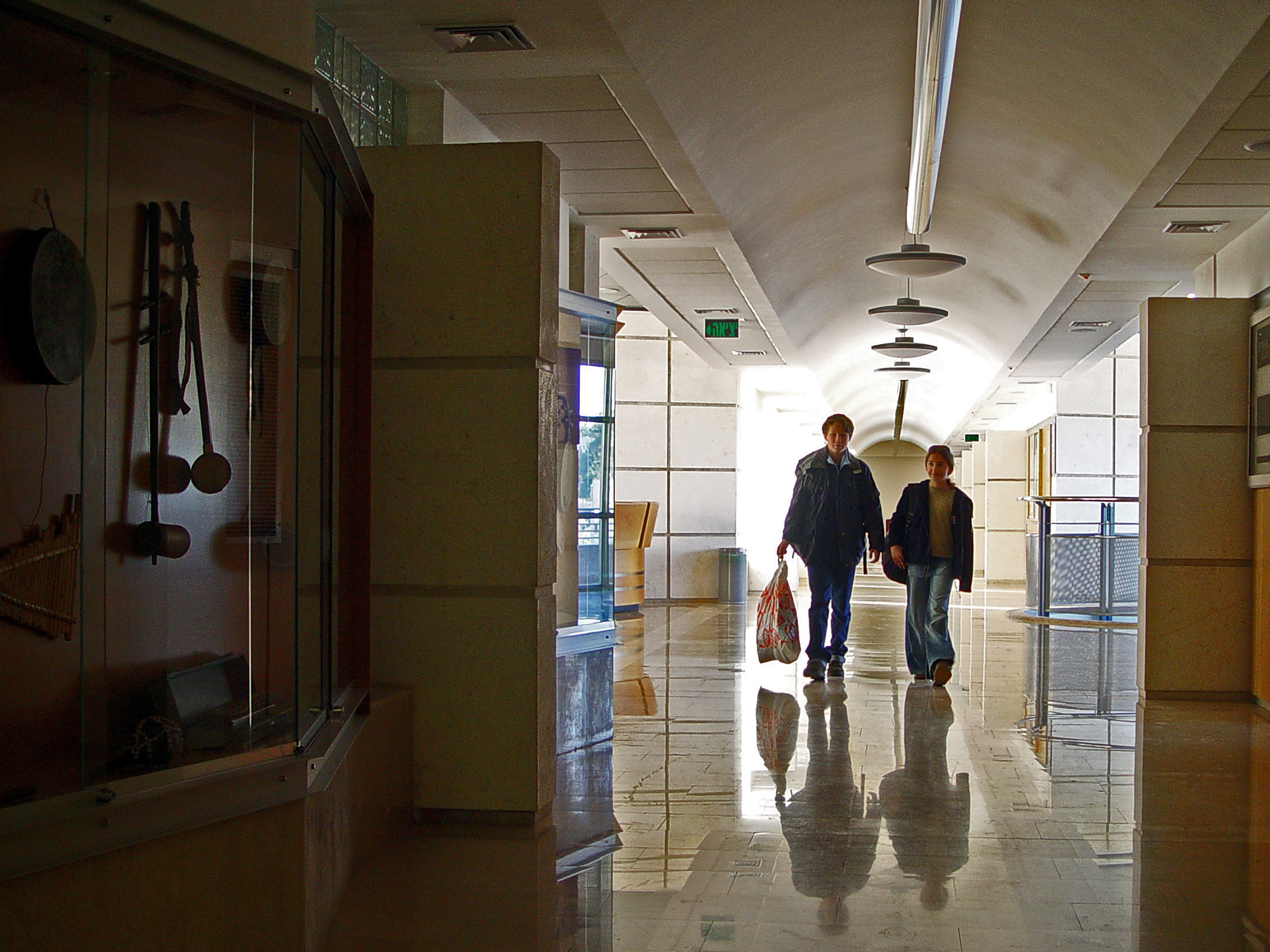
Jerusalem Academy of Music and Dance – high school

The Academy High School is situated in the Younes and Soraya Nazarian Building in Givat Ram, adjacent to the Academy's main building. Founded in the late 1960s, the curriculum combines general studies with specialization in music and dance.

== Summer programs ==
The academy runs an annual two-week program called the International Summer Institute for Strings.

== Conservatory ==
The Conservatory offers individual and group instruction in music and dance for students from the age of five. Students attend special workshops and master classes taught by the Academy's senior lecturers, and perform as soloists and in ensembles in Israel and overseas. Over 700 students are currently studying at the Conservatory.

== Notable alumni ==
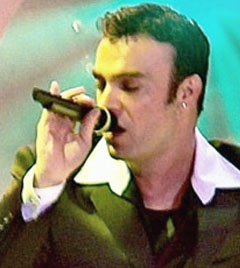
David D'Or

- Ofir Ben Shitrit (born 1995), singer
- David Bizic (born 1975), operatic baritone
- Natan Brand (1944–90), classical pianist
- Drora Bruck (born 1966), recorder player
- David D'Or (born 1965), singer, composer, and songwriter
- Noga Erez (born 1989), singer
- Riki Guy (born c. 1975), full-lyric soprano
- Gilad Atzmon (born 1963), jazz saxophonist and academic
- Nurit Hirsch (born 1942), composer, arranger, and conductor
- Walter Hautzig (born 1921), classical pianist
- Daniella Kertesz (born 1989), actress
- Naomi Shemer (1930–2004), songwriter
- Robert Starer (1924–2001), composer and pianist
- Edna Stern (born 1977), pianist
- Ilan Volkov (born 1976), orchestral conductor
- Yitzhak Yedid (born 1971), Israeli-Australian composer of classical music and jazz pianist
- Lior Rosner (born 1969), Israeli-American composer of classical music and film music

== See also ==
- List of universities and colleges in Israel
- Dance in Israel
- Music in Israel
- Education in Israel
