= Guy Henry =

Guy Henry may refer to:

- Guy Vernor Henry (1839–1899), military officer and Governor of Puerto Rico
- Guy Henry (equestrian) (1875–1967), American Olympic equestrian
- Guy Henry (actor) (born 1960), British stage and screen actor
- Guy Henri (1922-2002), French actor

== See also ==
- Henry Guy (disambiguation)
