= Edna Stern =

Belgian-Israeli pianist

Edna Stern (Hebrew: עדנה שטרן; born 6 March 1977) is a Belgian-Israeli pianist.

== Biography ==
She was born in Belgium, and grew up in Israel. She began to play piano at the age of six. She studied piano under Viktor Derevianko and Natasha Tadson at the Rubin Academy of Music and Dance in Tel Aviv.

Afterwards she studied at the Chapelle Royale Reine Elisabeth in Brussels, and studied with Martha Argerich. In 1996 she moved to Basel, Switzerland, where she studied for four years as a student of Krystian Zimerman. Later on she took part in masters courses in piano at the International Piano Academy Lake Como under Alicia de Larrocha, Dimitri Bashkirow, Andreas Staier, and Leon Fleisher.

She followed Fleisher to the Peabody Institute of the Johns Hopkins University, in Baltimore, Maryland, for a year. In 2000 she won the international competition, Senigallia, and in 2001 the Juventus Award.

In 2003 she moved to Paris, where she began to deliver historically informed period performances on the fortepiano.

Her first CD, Chaconne, was named the best CD of 2005 by Arte.

Since September 2009 this artist has been teaching at the Royal College of Music in London.

== Repertoire ==
Her current repertoire varies from Johann Sebastian Bach, Carl Philipp Emanuel Bach, and Luciano Berio to contemporary composers.

== CDs ==
- 2005: Chaconne (Pieces from Ferruccio Busoni, Rudolf Lutz, and Johann Sebastian Bach), with Amandine Beyer (violin)
- 2008: Sonatas by Carl Philipp Emanuel Bach for violin and keyboard
- 2008: Fantasies by Robert Schumann
- 2009: Nun komm der Heiden Heiland – Preludes, fugues und chorals by Bach
- 2010: Chopin Piano Sonate No. 2 / Préludes
- 2010: Mozart Piano Concerto No. 9 Jeune Homme and Concertos Nos 12 & 14 – Edna Stern & Orchestre d'Auvergne – Highly Acclaimed Performance BBC Radio CD Review
