= Wally Guy =

Australian rules footballer, born 1910

Personal information
- Full name: Walter Leslie Guy
- Born: 25 October 1910
- Died: 28 March 1978 (aged 67)
- Original team: Carrum
- Position: on ball

Playing career^{1}
Years	Club	Games (Goals)
1934	North Melbourne	8 (4)
1938	Sorrento	17 (unknown)
- ^{1} Playing statistics correct to the end of 1934.

Career highlights
- 1938 Sorrento Best & Fairest

Walter Leslie Guy (25 October 1910 – 28 March 1978) was an Australian rules footballer who played with North Melbourne in the Victorian Football League (VFL).

== Family ==
One of the nine children of Willie Guy (1886–1946), and Ruby May Guy (1889–1960), née Sawyer, Walter Leslie Guy was born on 25 October 1910.

His youngest brother, Eric Arthur Guy (1932–1991) played for St Kilda Football Club. A nephew, Gary Guy (1952–), the son of another of his brothers, Ivan, played for the Melbourne Football Club.

== Football ==
He was cleared from Carrum Football Club to North Melbourne Football Club on 20 June 1934.
