= Claude Abravanel =

Swiss pianist and composer

Claude Abravanel קלוד אברבנל
- Born: 16 July 1924; Montreux, Switzerland
- Died: 14 December 2012 (aged 88)
- Genres: Classical
- Occupation(s): Pianist, composer
- Instrument: Piano

Claude Abravanel (Hebrew: קלוד אברבנל; 16 July 1924 – 14 December 2012) was a Swiss-Israeli pianist and composer of classical music.

== Activities ==
He studied piano with Dinu Lipatti at the Geneva Conservatory of Music. He also studied composition with Arthur Honegger and piano with Yvonne Lefébure at the Ecole Normale de Musique in Paris. A lecturer and director of the library at the Jerusalem Academy of Music and Dance (Rubin Academy) until 1992, Abravanel became director of the Archives of Israeli Music at the Academy.

== Ensemble compositions Chamber Music ==
- Elegy,[ for low Voice & Flute]
- Four Songs [for Alto & Cello]
- Hymn of Praise on a Yemenite Motive [for high voice & piano]
- Les Amours de Ronsard, [for high voice & piano]
- Prelude, Aria & Postlude for clarinet & piano
- Supplication, Choreographical Poem [for flute & piano]
- Three Psalms [for High Voice & Piano]
- Tre Sonetti di Petrarca [for high voice & piano]

== Personal history ==
Abravanel was born in Montreux, Switzerland, and settled in Israel in 1951.

== See also ==
- Aria
- Chamber Music
- Music of Israel
- Petrarca
- Pierre de Ronsard
- Yemenite

== Additional reference material ==
- ©The National Library of Israel. All rights reserved retrieved 23/9/11
- book written by Abravanel retrieved 23/9/11
