= Bill Stevens (footballer, born 1939) =

Australian rules footballer

Personal information
- Full name: William Stevens
- Born: 26 May 1939
- Original team: Carrum / Melbourne reserves
- Height: 184 cm (6 ft 0 in)
- Weight: 77 kg (170 lb)

Playing career^{1}
Years	Club	Games (Goals)
1961	Fitzroy	2 (0)
- ^{1} Playing statistics correct to the end of 1961.

Bill Stevens (born 26 May 1939) is a former Australian rules footballer who played with Fitzroy in the Victorian Football League (VFL).
