= Riki Guy =

Israeli full-lyric soprano

Riki Guy ריקי גאי
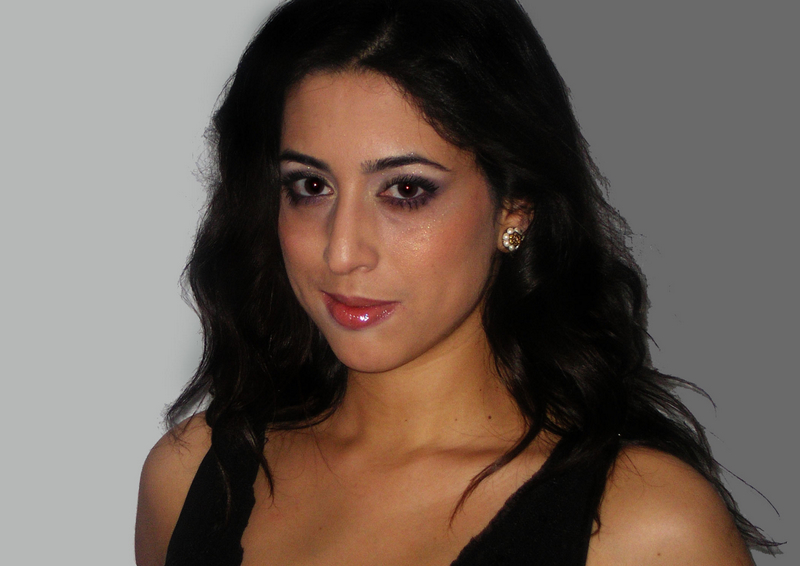
- Photograph of Guy in 2008

Background information
- Born: 1975 (age 50–51)
- Origin: Israel
- Occupation: Lyric soprano
- Years active: 1997-2010

Riki Guy (Hebrew: ריקי גאי; born c. 1975) is an Israeli full-lyric soprano.

== Education ==
Riki Guy graduated from the Jerusalem Academy of Music and Dance in 1997.

== Awards ==
Scholarships and awards include the Israel Vocal Arts Institute scholarships America Israel Cultural Foundation scholarships. Additional important awards include two New Israeli Opera awards – the "Grebov" Prize in 2000 and the "Basser" Prize in 1999.

In 2000, Riki Guy won first prize in the Vera Rozsa Vocal Competition, and later that year she won first prize in the "Lions" Vocal Competition, both in Israel. That year, Riki Guy also won the special prize granted by the chairman of the jury of the Romeo et Juliette competition in Budapest.

In 2002, Riki Guy won the International Media Prize, the Prize of the Chambre Professionnelle des Directeurs d’Opera, and the special prize of the Leipzig opera at the Hans Gabor Belvedere Competition in Vienna. In 2001, Ms. Guy won First Prize in the opera category, at the International Vocal Competition in Marmande.

== Stage roles ==
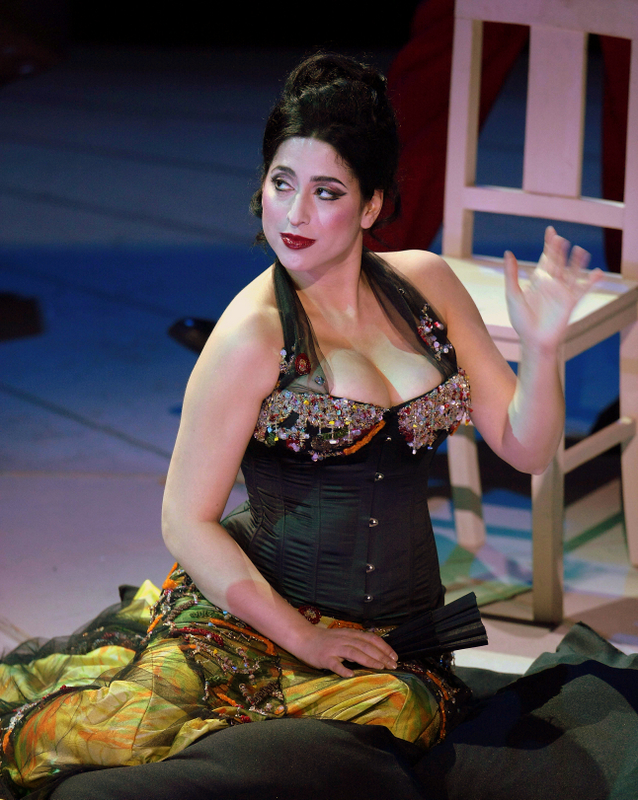
Riki Guy as Giulietta in Les Contes d'Hoffmann

- Giulietta, The Tales of Hoffmann: Zurich Opera House 2009/10, Lisbon Opera House 2007/08, Leipzig Opera House 2002/03/06
- Antonia, The Tales of Hoffmann: Graz Opera House 2005/06, International Vocal Arts Institute 2004
- Micaela, Carmen: Aalto Theatre Essen 2002/03, Deutsche Oper am Rhein 2002/03, New Israeli Opera 2002
- Mimi, La bohème: Volkstheater Rostock 2002/03
- Second Niece, Peter Grimes: New Israeli Opera 2002
- Angelica, Suor Angelica: International Vocal Arts Institute 2002
- First Soprano, St. Mattheus Passion: New Israeli Opera 2002
- Pallade Venus, L'incoronazione di Poppea: New Israeli Opera 2002
- Pamina, The Magic Flute: Israel Philharmonic Orchestra 2001
- Angel & Nurse, Alfa and Omega: New Israeli Opera 2001
- Contessa & Ceprano, Rigoletto: New Israeli Opera 2000
- Adina, L'elisir d'amore: International Vocal Arts Institute 1999
- Princess, L'enfant et les sortilèges: International Vocal Arts Institute 1998
- Musetta, La bohème: International Vocal arts institute 1997
- Gretel, Hänsel and Gretel: Israel Philharmonic Orchestra 1997
- Dido, Dido and Æneas: Music Days Festival 1997

== Orchestral engagements and recitals ==
- Ah! perfido (Beethoven): Easter Festival Warsaw 2006
- Coronation Mass/Lobgesang: Bochum Symphonic 2003/04
- Several works: Staatsorchester Kassel 2003/04
- Aria Concert: The Lions Club – Maggio Musicale; Fiorentino, Teatro Comunale 2001
- Aria Concert: Haifa Symphony 2000
- Bach Arias: Israeli Philharmonic Orchestra 1996
- A Midsummer Night's Dream (Mendelssohn): Israeli Philharmonic Orchestra 1995
- Stabat Mater (Pergolesi): The Israel Sinfonietta Beer–Sheva 1991
