= Edna Guy (artist) =

British artist (1897–1969)

- Born: 10 July 1897; Sutton, England
- Died: 1969 (aged 71–72)
- Education: Academie Julian; Spenlove School; Slade School of Fine Art
- Known for: Marine painting

Edna W Guy (10 July 1897 – 1969) was a British marine artist and a notable oil painter.

== Biography ==
Guy was born at Sutton in Surrey and was trained as an artist in South Africa by John Amschewitz during 1920 before continuing her training in Paris at the Academie Julian throughout 1921 and 1922. After a break Guy returned to full-time study in 1934 at the Spenlove School where Reginald Eves taught her. Guy enrolled in the Slade School of Fine Art in 1936 where she was taught by Randolph Schwabe. Guy was a member of the Royal Watercolour Society and also exhibited with the Royal Society of Marine Artists. She also exhibited paintings at the Royal Academy in London, with the Society of Women Artists and the National Society of Painters, Sculptors and Engravers. Guy exhibited extensively abroad, notably in Paris at both the Paris Salon and at the Salon de la Marine.
