= Governor Guy =

Governor Guy may refer to:

- Geoffrey Colin Guy (1921–2006), Governor of Dominica from 1965 until 1967 and Governor of Saint Helena from 1976 to 1980
- John Guy (governor) (died 1629), 1st proprietary governor of Newfoundland Colony from 1610 to 1614
- William L. Guy (1919–2013), 26th Governor of North Dakota
