= Madison Guy =

Northern Irish footballer

Personal information
- Date of birth: 25 October 1994 (age 32)
- Height: 5 ft 8 in (1.73 m)
- Position: Midfielder

Youth career
- Vancouver Whitecaps

College career
Years	Team	Apps	(Gls)
2012–2016	UBC Thunderbirds	80	(11)

International career^{‡}
2012	Republic of Ireland U19		
2017–	Northern Ireland		
- ‡ National team caps and goals as of 19:46, 30 August 2019 (UTC)

Madison Guy (born 25 October 1994) is a soccer player and internet entrepreneur who has appeared for the Northern Ireland women's national team.

== Soccer ==
=== Club and college career ===
Guy is from Langley, British Columbia and played youth soccer in Langley and Surrey. Between 2007 and 2010 she was on the British Columbia provincial selection and attended the Canadian national training centre. She also played for the youth team of Vancouver Whitecaps.

In 2012 Guy graduated from Brookswood Secondary School and went to UBC Sauder School of Business on a college soccer scholarship. She captained the soccer team to the 2015 U Sports women's soccer championship, scoring in the 3–0 final win over rivals Trinity Western Spartans.

=== International career ===
Under FIFA eligibility rules, Guy could play for Ireland as her maternal grandmother is Irish. She approached the Football Association of Ireland about playing for the Republic of Ireland women's national under-19 football team, and was called into a squad training camp in January 2012. She played for the under-19s in two friendlies against Scotland in August 2012.

Guy was later capped for the Northern Ireland national team, appearing for the team during the 2019 FIFA Women's World Cup qualifying cycle. She made her senior international debut in the 3–1 win over Slovakia at Štadión pod Dubňom, Žilina on 28 November 2017. She also represented Northern Ireland at the 2018 Turkish Women's Cup.

== GrantMe ==
Informed by her own experiences as a student athlete, in 2017 Guy founded GrantMe, an online service to help college students access additional funding. The success of the startup venture and her increased workload as the chief executive officer prompted Guy to pause her soccer career.
