= Doug Guy =

Australian rules footballer

Personal information
- Full name: Douglas George Guy
- Born: 21 November 1929
- Died: 8 June 1993 (aged 63)
- Original team: East Brunswick
- Height: 180 cm (5 ft 11 in)
- Weight: 80 kg (176 lb)

Playing career^{1}
Years	Club	Games (Goals)
1950–53	Carlton	39 (2)
- ^{1} Playing statistics correct to the end of 1953.

Douglas George Guy (21 November 1929 - 8 June 1993) was an Australian rules footballer who played with Carlton in the Victorian Football League (VFL).
