= Wally Hillis =

Australian rules footballer

Personal information
- Full name: Wally Hillis
- Born: 2 March 1938
- Died: 10 February 2006 (aged 67)
- Original team: Carrum
- Height: 185 cm (6 ft 1 in)
- Weight: 81 kg (179 lb)
- Position: Defender

Playing career^{1}
Years	Club	Games (Goals)
1962	Richmond	3 (0)
- ^{1} Playing statistics correct to the end of 1962.

Wally Hillis (2 March 1938 – 10 February 2006) was an Australian rules footballer who played with Richmond in the Victorian Football League (VFL).
