= James Guy =

James Guy may refer to:

- James Guy (Australian politician) (1860–1921), Australian politician from Tasmania
- James Guy (British politician) (1894–?), Scottish politician, MP for Edinburgh Central 1931–1941
- James Guy (swimmer) (born 1995), British swimmer
