= Finley Guy Building =

- U.S. National Register of Historic Places
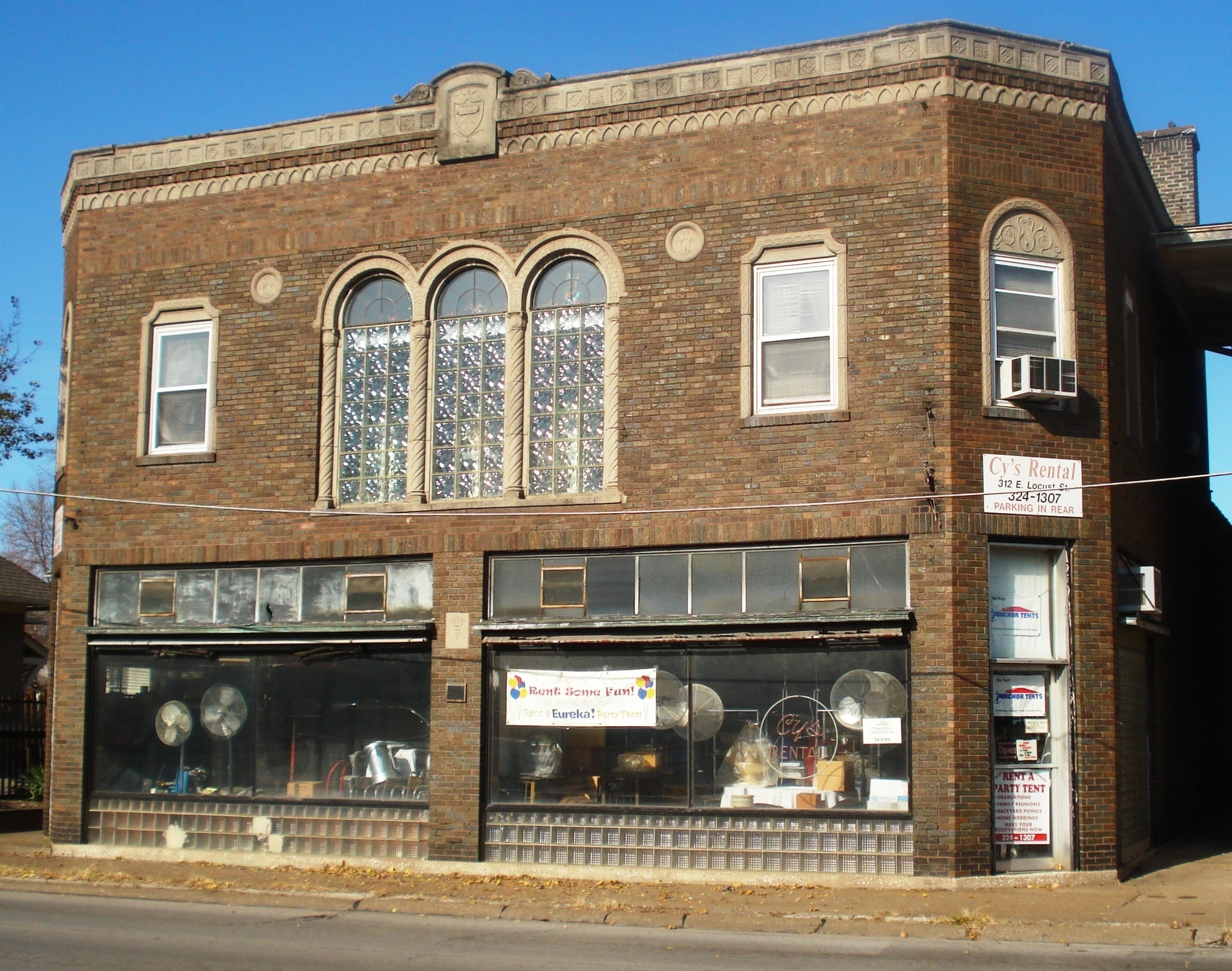

- Location within Iowa Location within the United States
- Location: 310 E. Locust St. Davenport, Iowa
- Coordinates: 41°32′18″N 90°34′13″W
- Area: less than one acre
- Architectural style: Mission/Spanish Revival
- MPS: Davenport MRA
- NRHP reference No.: 84001426
- Added to NRHP: July 27, 1984

Finley Guy Building is a historic building in central Davenport, Iowa, United States. The Spanish Colonial Revival structure was listed on the National Register of Historic Places in 1984.

== History ==
Finley Guy had this building constructed in 1928 to house his drug store. Lorenzen Grocery and Meat Market occupied the second commercial space. The building has housed a rental shop for many years. Guy himself made his home in the second-floor residential space.

== Architecture ==
The Finley Guy Building is noteworthy for its use of Spanish Colonial Revival architecture. The style was rarely employed in Davenport and when it was used it is found in residential architecture. The building features heavily textured polychrome face brick and metal casement windows. Both decorative elements are typical of buildings constructed in Davenport in the late 1920s and in the 1930s, but they are generally found in Tudor Revival and Cotswold Cottage styles. The building is also noteworthy for its use of molded concrete decoration. Spiral colonnettes frame windows on the second floor, and tiles with a variety of patterns are found on the parapet level. The concrete window surrounds have a helical pattern. There is also a concrete plaque between the main floor shop windows with a caduceus, which refers to the building's original use as a drug store.
