= Mary E. Guy =

American political scientist and academic

- Occupations: Political scientist, public administration scholar, academic, and author
- Awards: Fellow, National Academy of Public Administration; Dwight Waldo Award, American Society for Public Administration; Paul Van Riper Award for Excellence and Service, ASPA

Academic background
- Education: B.A., Psychology; M.A., Rehabilitation Counseling; M.A., Psychology; Ph.D., Political Science
- Alma mater: Jacksonville University; University of Florida; University of South Carolina

Academic work
- Institutions: School of Public Affairs, University of Colorado Denver; Florida State University; University of Alabama at Birmingham

Mary E. Guy is an American political scientist, public administration scholar, academic, and author. She is a professor at School of Public Affairs at University of Colorado Denver.

Guy has published papers and books on topics related to public administration. She is best known for exploring the emotive demands of street level work, and for her work on the difference that gender makes. Her research has a particular focus on public service delivery, dynamics within the citizen-state encounter, emotional labor, and social equity. She has authored books, including Professionals in Organizations: Debunking a Myth, From Organizational Decline to Organizational Renewal: The Phoenix Syndrome, Emotional Labor: Putting the Service in Public Service, Ethical Decision Making for Everyday Work Situations, Emotional Labor and Crisis Response: Working on the Razor's Edge, and Essentials of Public Service: An Introduction to Contemporary Public Administration.

Guy is a fellow of the National Academy of Public Administration. She was editor-in-chief of Review of Public Personnel Administration from 2001 through 2006.

== Education ==
Guy studied at Jacksonville University and received her bachelor's degree in Psychology in 1969. In the following year, she obtained her master's degree in Rehabilitation Counseling from University of Florida. She then enrolled at University of South Carolina and earned her master's degree in Psychology in 1976, and Doctoral Degree in political science in 1981.

== Career ==
Upon receiving her Doctoral degree, Guy joined the University of Alabama at Birmingham as assistant professor in 1982, and was promoted to associate professor in 1986, and to Professor in 1991. She assumed the Jerry Collins Eminent Scholar Chair in the Askew School of Public Administration and Policy at Florida State University in 1997. In 2008 she joined the School of Public Affairs at University of Colorado Denver as a professor.

== Research ==
Guy's research is focused on public administration, with a particular attention on public service delivery, dynamics within the citizen-state encounter, emotional labor, social equity, and the difference that gender makes in policy development and implementation.

=== Public administration ===
In her study regarding public administration, Guy discussed the divergence, parallel paths, and convergence that link political science and public administration as fields, and highlighted Woodrow Wilson’s point of view about politics and administration. Using bibliometric mapping, she demonstrated the intellectual networks and paths that emotional labor research has followed in its early diffusion into the field. Furthermore, she criticized civil service systems which are designed on the assumptions of a bygone era, thus failing to acknowledge and compensate emotional labor.

Guy presented several approaches for strengthening government and increasing government's capacity to deal with the complexity of interrelated social, administrative, demographic, and economic challenges, and explored Paul Volcker's dream of a government that works better.

=== Public management ===
Guy examined two decades of affirmative action initiatives and drew a comparative analysis based on the status of women and men in career public management positions. In her study, she argued that women have a long way to go before they reach parity. In 2014, she conducted a study based on the 2002 General Social Survey of 454 government employees and compared Baby Boomers to GenXers. Results of her study indicated minor differences between the Baby Boom generation and Generation X in terms of their appraisal of work motivation factors. She also studied the concepts regarding emotional labor and artful affect, which advances our understanding of leadership.

=== Public sector human resource management ===
Guy defined human service organizations, discussed the attributes that distinguish them from other organizational forms, and proposed a range of theoretical approaches to address these attributes. Furthermore, she described the relationship that exists between emotional labor and job burnout in the context of individualist versus collectivist cultures, while taking a sample of public servants in the United States and China.

== Awards and honors ==
- 1998 – Fellow, National Academy of Public Administration
- 2009 - Delivered Donald Stone Lecture, American Society for Public Administration (ASPA)
- 2010 - Award for Excellence in Service, University of Colorado Denver
- 2011,2014,2017,2018 - Chester A. Newland Presidential Citation of Merit, American Society for Public Administration
- 2012 - ASPA/NASPAA Distinguished Research Award
- 2018 - Dwight Waldo Award, American Society for Public Administration
- 2018 - Visiting Distinguished Professor, Boise State University
- 2020 - Paul Van Riper Award for Excellence and Service, ASPA

== Bibliography ==
=== Books ===
- Professionals in Organizations: Debunking a Myth (1985) ISBN 9780275901110
- From Organizational Decline to Organizational Renewal: The Phoenix Syndrome (1989) ISBN 9780899303727
- Ethical Decision Making in Everyday Work Situations (1990) ISBN 9780899304182
- Women and Men of the States: Public Administrators at the State Level (1992) ISBN 9781563240515
- Emotional Labor: Putting the Service in Public Service (2008) ISBN 9780765621177
- Emotional Labor and Crisis Response: Working on the Razor's Edge (2012) ISBN 9780765625199
- Public Administration Evolving: From Foundations to the Future (2015) ISBN 9781317514534
- Essentials of Public Service: An Introduction to Contemporary Public Administration (2018) ISBN 9780999235904
- The Palgrave Handbook of Global Perspectives on Emotional Labor in Public Service (2019) ISBN 9783030248239
- Achieving Social Equity: From Problems to Solutions (2020) ISBN 9781733934466

=== Selected articles ===
- Guy, M. E. (1990). Ethical decision making in everyday work situations. Greenwood Publishing Group.
- Kelly, R. M., Guy, M. E., Bayes, J., Duerst-Lahti, G., Duke, L. L., Hale, M. M., ... & Stanley, J. R. (1991). Public managers in the states: A comparison of career advancement by sex. Public Administration Review, 402–412.
- Guy, M.E. (1993). Three steps forward, two steps backward: The status of women's integration into public management. Public Administration Review, 53(4), 285–292.
- Guy, M. E., & Newman, M. A. (2004). Women's jobs, men's jobs: Sex segregation and emotional labor. Public administration review, 64(3), 289–298.
- Yang, S. B., & Guy, M. E. (2006). GenXers versus boomers: Work motivators and management implications. Public Performance & Management Review, 29(3), 267–284.
- Newman, M. A., Guy, M. E., & Mastracci, S. H. (2009). Beyond cognition: Affective leadership and emotional labor. Public Administration Review, 69(1), 6-20.
- Guy, M.E. & Lee, H. J. (2015). Emotional intelligence and emotional labor: How related are they?” Review of Public Personnel Administration, 35(3): 261-277.
- Guy, M.E. (2017). Mom work versus dad work in local government. Administration & Society 49(1): 48-64
- Guy, M.E. (2020). Emotive skills are work skills.” Public Personnel Management, 49(3): 327–330.
