= Barry Colliver =

Australian rules footballer

Personal information
- Full name: Barry Raymond Colliver
- Born: 28 February 1935
- Died: 19 May 2023 (aged 88)
- Original team: Carrum
- Height: 177 cm (5 ft 10 in)
- Weight: 79 kg (174 lb)
- Position: Half-back

Playing career^{1}
Years	Club	Games (Goals)
1954–1955	Essendon	7 (1)
- ^{1} Playing statistics correct to the end of 1955.

Barry Raymond Colliver (28 February 1935 – 19 May 2023) was an Australian rules footballer who played for the Essendon Football Club in the Victorian Football League (VFL). He won the under-19s best and fairest in 1952 and was captain the next year. After his time for the Essendon, Colliver played for the Rushworth Football Club and was captain-coach of Lake Boga.
