= Lubbock Avalanche-Journal =

American daily newspaper in Texas, US

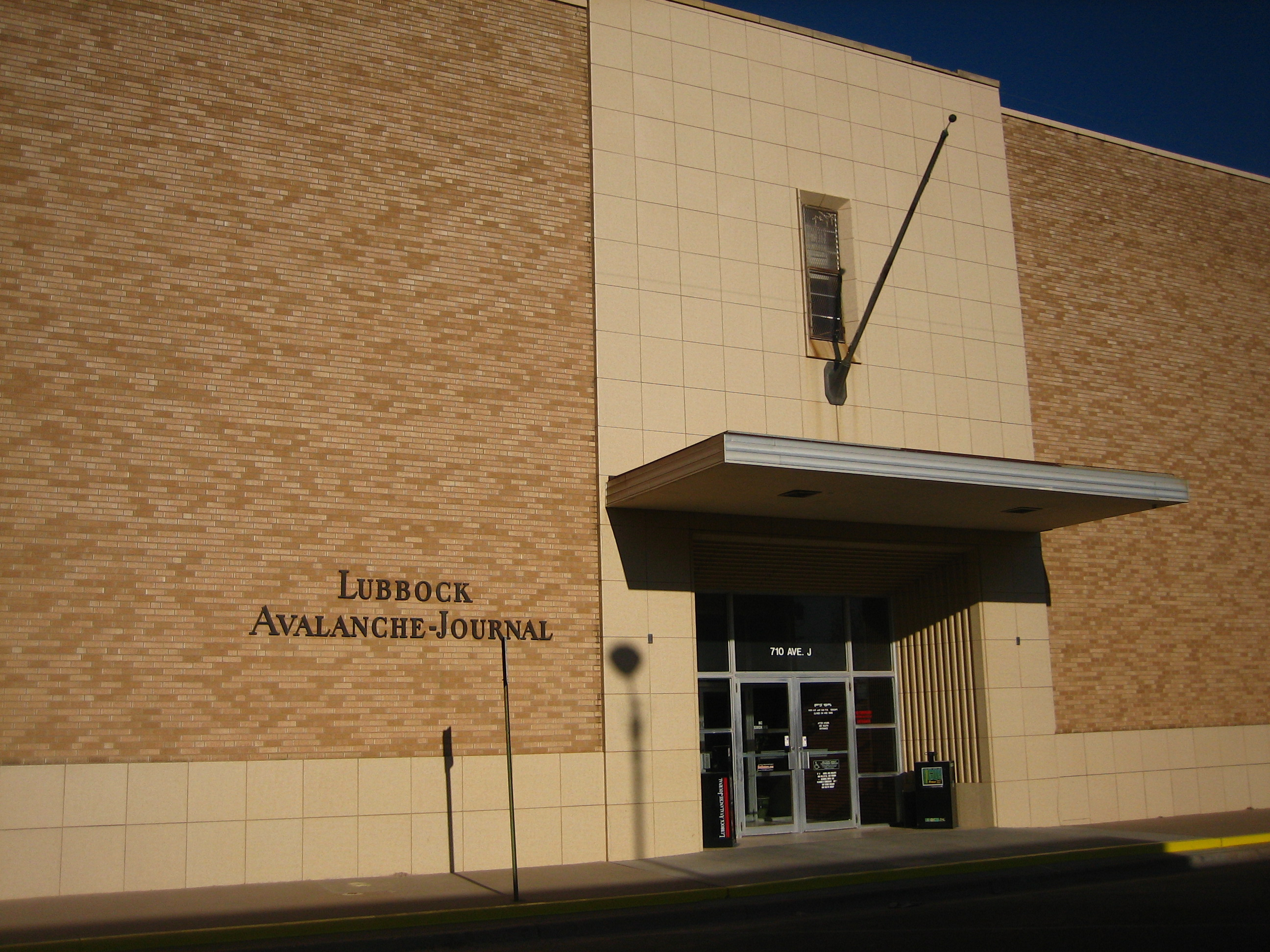
- Type: Daily newspaper
- Format: Broadsheet
- Owner: USA Today Co.
- Founder(s): John James Dillard, Thad Tubbs
- Editor: Adam Young
- Founded: May 4, 1900; 125 years ago as The Avalanche
- Language: English
- Headquarters: 710 Avenue J; Lubbock, Texas 79401
- Country: United States
- Circulation: 7,260 (as of 2023)
- ISSN: 2331-6349 (print); 2331-6357 (web)
- OCLC number: 13942131
- Website: www.lubbockonline.com

Lubbock Avalanche-Journal is a newspaper based in Lubbock, Texas, United States. It is owned by USA Today Co.

== History ==
The Lubbock Avalanche was founded in 1900 by John James Dillard and Thad Tubbs. According to Dillard, the name "Avalanche" was chosen due to his desire that the newspaper surprise the citizens of Lubbock. The newspaper was sold to James Lorenzo Dow in 1908. In 1922, the Avalanche became a daily newspaper (except for Mondays) and a year later added a morning edition.

In 1926, the owners of the rival Lubbock Daily Journal, editor Charles A. Guy and partner Dorrance Roderick, bought The Avalanche to form The Lubbock Avalanche-Journal. The pair partnered with Houston Harte and Bernard Hanks, later of Harte Hanks, as well as J. Lindsay Nunn of The Amarillo Daily News and Post. In 1928, Guy, Roderick, and Nunn bought control of the Avalanche-Journal from Harte and Hanks. Guy was named editor and publisher in 1931 of The Avalanche-Journal, a position he held until 1972. Other journalists to serve as editor were Jay Harris, Burle Pettit, Randy Sanders, Terry Greenberg, James Bennett, Jill Nevels-Haun and Adam Young.

The Amarillo Globe-News Publishing Company, headed by Eugene A. Howe and Wilbur C. Hawk, would later own the majority of The Avalanche-Journal. In 1951, the Whittenburg family in Amarillo acquired the Avalanche-Journal, after their Panhandle Publishing Company was merged with Globe-News company. In 1972, both The Avalanche-Journal and The Amarillo Globe-News were acquired by Morris Communications of Augusta, Georgia.

On Tuesday, May 12, 1970, the day after a massive F5 tornado had devastated much of downtown Lubbock—including the Avalanche-Journal building at 8th Street and Avenue J—the newspaper managed to publish an eight-page edition by dictating reports to its sister paper, the Globe-News, in Amarillo, Texas. That morning a print run of 60,000 copies bearing the page-one headline "Twister Smashes Lubbock, 20 Dead, Hundreds Injured," the first printed news of the storm, went out from Amarillo, 100 miles north of Lubbock. The May 13 edition, listing names of the known dead, was published in the same manner, and by May 14 The Avalanche-Journal was again printed locally.

During strikes over crop support prices in 1977, an editorial published in the Lubbock Avalanche-Journal infuriated farmers, who blockaded the newspaper's delivery docks with their tractors. The unsigned editorial accused farmers of using the "anti-social tactics of union goons." Farmers demanded an apology and formed a tractor blockade, preventing trucks from delivering newspapers. Editor Jay Harris spoke with the farmers and indicated the editorial was not intended to imply that the farmers were goons.

In 2008, The Avalanche-Journal led an investigation into the 1985 rape conviction of Tim Cole, a Texas Tech University student who had died in prison in 1999 at the age of thirty-nine. The A-J's three-part series on Cole's exoneration in light of DNA evidence, "Hope Deferred," helped prompt a legislative ruling in Texas permitting posthumous pardons, and on March 1, 2010, Governor Rick Perry granted the state's first posthumous pardon to Cole.

The Avalanche-Journal launched a full-color lifestyle publication, Lubbock Magazine, in April 2008. The magazine is published eight times a year.

In February 2011, The Avalanche-Journal became the first media company on the South Plains to launch an application for the iPad.

In 2017, Morris Communications sold its newspapers to GateHouse Media, since rebranded following a merger with Gannett.

In March 2022, The Avalanche-Journal moved to a six day printing schedule, eliminating its printed Saturday edition.

In 2025, the paper announced it will shut down its printing press.

== Journalists ==
Journalists who got their start at the Lubbock Avalanche-Journal include CBS Evening News anchor Scott Pelley.
