= Alain Guy =

French philosopher

Alain Guy (11 August 1918 – 7 November 1998) was a French philologist and hispanist.
