= Mila Guy =

South African actress

- Born: Mila Guy; 14 November 1992 (age 33); Nelspruit, South Africa
- Education: University of Auckland; University of Pretoria
- Occupations: Actress; Costume designer
- Years active: 2014–present
- Spouse: Ben Fourie (m. 2023)

Mila Guy (born 14 November 1992) is a South African actress and costume designer. She is best known for her role as "Malanie Schmit" in the kykNet television series Hotel and her critically acclaimed role as "Nonnie Blignout" in the film Liewe Kersfeesvader.

== Personal life ==
Mila was born on 14 November 1992 in Nelspruit in Mpumalanga, South Africa. When she was in Standard 8, she emigrated to New Zealand with her family. Her first year of tertiary education was completed at the University of Auckland. After returning to South Africa, she graduated with her BA degree in Drama at the University of Pretoria in 2014. She is married to Ben Fourie.

== Career ==
In 2014, she made her television debut during the 10th season of the kykNET soap opera Binnelanders, where she played the role of "Zanel Jordaan". In 2015, she made the film debut with Ballade vir 'n Enkeling. Then she acted in several short films and feature films such as; For the Birds, Wonderlus, Vuil Wasgoed, Desember, Stille Nag, Soek jy 'n Lift and Parable. In 2016, she was cast in the kykNET mockumentary comedy series Hotel, where she played the role "Malanie Schmit" in all seasons as a series regular. In the same year, she made an item song appearance in the kykNET musical drama series Sterlopers and a guest role in the SABC1 legal drama serial Sokhulu & Partners.

In 2017, she acted in the film Liewe Kersfeesvader directed by Etienne Fourie. In the film she played the role "Nonnie Blignout", where she was nominated for the Silwerskerm Festival Prize for Best Actress at the Silwerskerm Festival. In the same year, she joined with recurring cast as "Kara" in the kyKNET sitcom Phil101, as "Antoinette de Villiers" in the SABC1 comedy-drama Bedford Wives, as "Mia" on the SABC2 drama series Erfsondes, as "Benina" in the SABC2 telenovela Keeping Score and in 2019 as "Vicky" in the kykNET drama series Alles Malan.

In 2019, she made the titular role in the short film Miemie. The film later received an official selection at the 2019 Silwerskermfees. In April 2020, she made the debut appearance for the popular SABC2 soap opera 7de Laan, where she played the role of "Lana Basson". Quickly after that, she made a recurring role as "Karien Koelenberg" in a parody segment in the comedy show Die Laager. In 2020, she joined with the kykNET comedy-drama series Ekstra Medium by playing the role "Elke".

== Filmography ==
Year	Film	Role	Genre	Ref.
2014	Binnelanders	Zanel Jordaan	TV series	
2015	Ballade vir 'n Enkeling	Karlientjie Koekemoer	Film	
2016	For the Birds	Vrou	Film	
2016	Keeping Score	Benina	TV series	
2016	Hotel	Malanie Schmit	TV series	
2017	Wonderlus	Bride	Film	
2017	Vlugtig	Chantel	Short film	
2017	Vuil Wasgoed	Verpleegster	Film	
2017	Liewe Kersfeesvader	Nonnie Blignout	Film	
2017	Erfsondes	Mia	TV series	
2017	Bedford Wives	Antoinette De Villiers	TV series	
2017	Phil101	Kara	TV series	
2018	Axis Mundi	Christine van Heerden	Short film	
2019	Desember	Estelle Burger	TV movie	
2019	Stille Nag	Antoinette van der Hoven	TV movie	
2019	Soek jy 'n lift	Karmen	TV movie	
2019	Miemie	Miemie Naude	Short film	
2019	Alles Malan	Vicky	TV series	
2019	Chin Up!	Jogging Girl	TV series	
2020	7de Laan	Lana van Deventer	TV series	
2020	Parable	Young Mommy	TV movie	
2020	Ekstra Medium	Elke	TV series	
2020	Mr Johnson	Young Helena	Film	
2021	Die Speelkamer		TV movie	
2022	Legacy	Unknown	TV series	
2024	Summertide	Emily		
