= Llew Owens =

Australian rules footballer (1927–2018)

Personal information
- Full name: Llewellyn James Owens
- Born: 26 September 1927
- Died: 1 January 2018 (aged 90)
- Original team: Carrum
- Height: 175 cm (5 ft 9 in)
- Weight: 73 kg (161 lb)

Playing career^{1}
Years	Club	Games (Goals)
1947	Fitzroy	5 (3)
1951	South Melbourne	2 (1)
1952–54	Port Melbourne (VFA)	55 (44)
- ^{1} Playing statistics correct to the end of 1954.

Llewellyn James Owens (26 September 1927 – 1 January 2018) was an Australian rules footballer who played with Fitzroy and South Melbourne in the Victorian Football League (VFL).
