= The Bryan-College Station Eagle =

Daily newspaper in Bryan, Texas

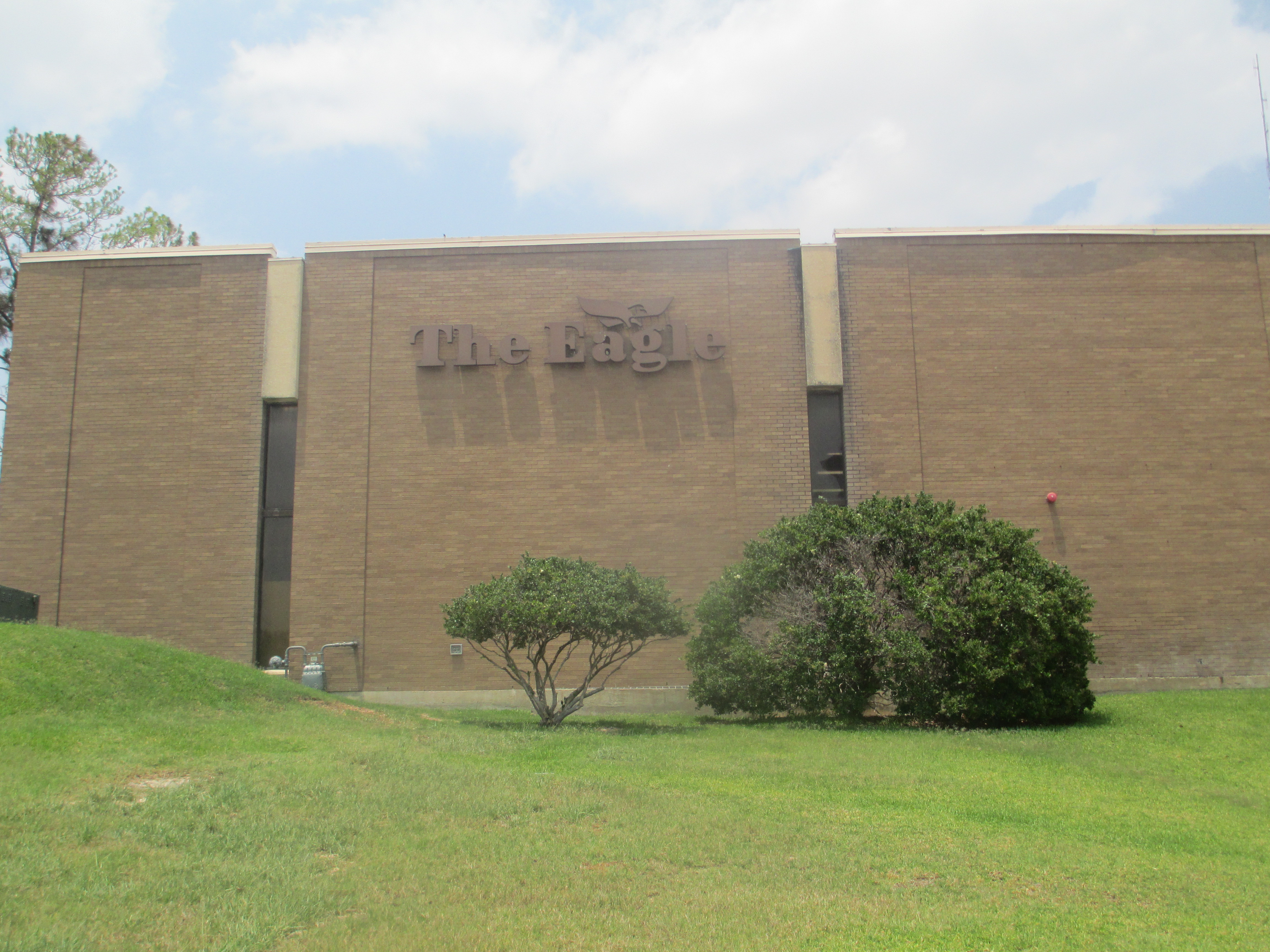
- The Eagle headquarters in Bryan, Texas
- Type: Daily newspaper
- Format: Broadsheet
- Owner: Lee Enterprises
- Founder: Richard M. Smith
- Managing editor: Rick Weegman
- Founded: October 26, 1889; 136 years ago
- Headquarters: 1729 Briarcrest Drive; Bryan, Texas 77802
- Country: United States
- Circulation: 6,682 Daily (as of 2023)
- ISSN: 0739-8727
- OCLC number: 9824088
- Website: theeagle.com

The Eagle, officially known as The Bryan-College Station Eagle, is a daily newspaper based in Bryan, Texas, United States. Centered in Brazos County, the paper covers an eight-county area around Bryan-College Station that includes Texas A&M University.

== History ==
First published by attorney Richard M. Smith as the Weekly Eagle on October 26, 1889, it transitioned to a daily in 1913.

The Eagle was owned by the Evening Post Publishing Company from 2001 to 2012, when it was sold to Berkshire Hathaway to become part of its BH Media Group subsidiary. At that time, the paper's average weekday circulation in 2012 was 19,132.

Previously, the newspaper was owned by Belo Corp. from 1995 to 2001, Worrell Newspapers from 1988 to 1995, Harte-Hanks Communications from 1962 to 1988 and local ownership prior to that. As of 2020, Lee Enterprises owns the paper.

Starting June 20, 2023, the print edition of the newspaper will be reduced to three days a week: Tuesday, Thursday and Saturday. Also, the newspaper will transition from being delivered by a traditional newspaper delivery carrier to mail delivery by the U.S. Postal Service.

== Awards ==
The Eagle has won multiple awards, including Texas Associated Press Managing Editors awards, as well as Newspaper Association of America circulation awards.
