= R. Kip Guy =

American physician

- Born: Alabama, US
- Spouse: Caitlin Allen
- Children: 2

Academic background
- Education: BA, chemistry, Reed College; PhD, organic chemistry, 1996, Scripps Research
- Thesis: An Exploration of the Chemistry of Taxo (1996)
- Doctoral advisor: K. C. Nicolaou

Academic work
- Institutions: University of Kentucky College of Pharmacy; St. Jude Children's Research Hospital; University of California, San Francisco

R. Kip Guy is an American pharmaceutical chemist. As of 2016, he is the dean of the University of Kentucky College of Pharmacy.

== Early life and education ==
Guy was born in Alabama but was raised in various places including Jacks Creek, Tennessee, England, and Ohio. He completed his Bachelor of Arts degree in chemistry from Reed College before working as a process development chemist in the process translation unit at IBM Research. Following this, he received his PhD in organic chemistry in 1996 based on the total synthesis of taxol from the Scripps Research Institute. His thesis was conducted under the guidance of K. C. Nicolaou and was titled An Exploration of the Chemistry of Taxol. After this, Guy accepted a postdoctoral fellowship in cellular biology at the University of Texas Southwestern Medical Center and additional training in physiology at the Woods Hole Oceanographic Institution.

== Career ==
After completing his postdoctoral fellowship, Guy joined the University of California, San Francisco as an assistant professor with joint appointments in pharmaceutical chemistry and cellular and molecular pharmacology. While there, he established an independent laboratory to develop strategies for targeting and signaling systems for testosterone and estrogen. In 2005, Guy moved to St. Jude Children's Research Hospital to found and chair its new department of chemical biology and therapeutics as the Robert J. Ulrich Chair in Chemical Biology and Therapeutics. While serving in this position, he led the anti-malarial drug-discovery effort and preclinical development of SJ733.

In October 2016, Guy left St. Jude's to become the dean of the University of Kentucky College of Pharmacy. While serving in this role, he continued his research from St. Jude studying blocking cancer-causing proteins on a cellular level. In 2017, his research team became the first to show that protein interaction controlled by N-terminal acetylation could be blocked. Following this discovery, Guy was elected a Fellow of the American Association for the Advancement of Science (AAAS).

== Personal life ==
Guy and his wife, pediatric psychologist Caitlin Allen, have two children together.
