= Syd Hogg =

Australian rules footballer, born 1902

Personal information
- Full name: Alfred Sidney Hogg
- Born: 6 September 1902; South Melbourne, Victoria
- Died: 22 June 1973 (aged 70); Upper Ferntree Gully, Victoria
- Height: 170 cm (5 ft 7 in)
- Weight: 63 kg (139 lb)
- Position: Wing

Playing career^{1}
Years	Club	Games (Goals)
1925–30	South Melbourne	54 (6)
- ^{1} Playing statistics correct to the end of 1930.

Alfred Sidney Hogg (6 September 1902 – 22 June 1973) was an Australian rules footballer who played with South Melbourne in the Victorian Football League (VFL).
