= William Guy (golfer) =

Scottish golfer (born 1967)

Personal information
- Full name: William Guy
- Nationality: Scotland
- Born: 8 October 1967 (age 59)
- Height: 6 ft 0 in (1.83 m)

Career
- Sport: Golf
- Turned professional: 1992
- Former tours: European Tour; Challenge Tour

Best results in major championships
- Masters Tournament: DNP
- PGA Championship: DNP
- U.S. Open: DNP
- The Open Championship: T59: 1992

William Guy (born 8 October 1967) is a Scottish professional golfer.

== Career ==
In 1991, Guy completed his five-year PGA apprenticeship at Buchanan Castle Golf Club and gained his European Tour Card in 1992. Over the next five years he would compete on the main European Tour and the second tier Challenge Tour. He finished tied 59th at the 1992 Open Championship and tied 66th at the 1993 Open Championship. Guy had several top-10 finishes, including the Kenya Open where he finished sixth.
