= William Guy (dentist) =

British pioneer of modern dentistry

- Born: 3 December 1859; Biddenden, Kent, England
- Died: 29 May 1950 (aged 90)
- Occupation: Dentist

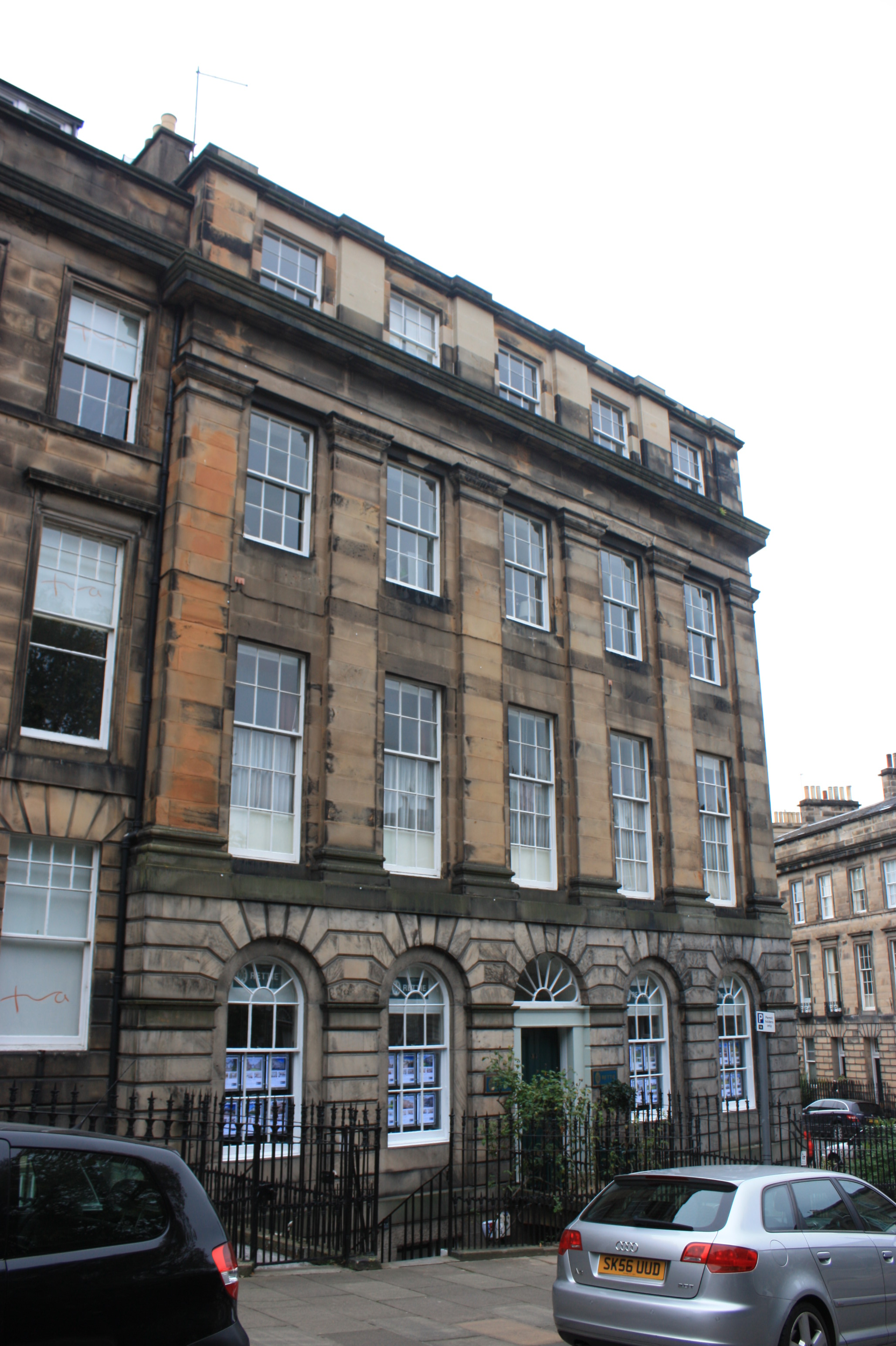
William Guy's dental surgery on the ground floor of 11 Wemyss Place, Edinburgh

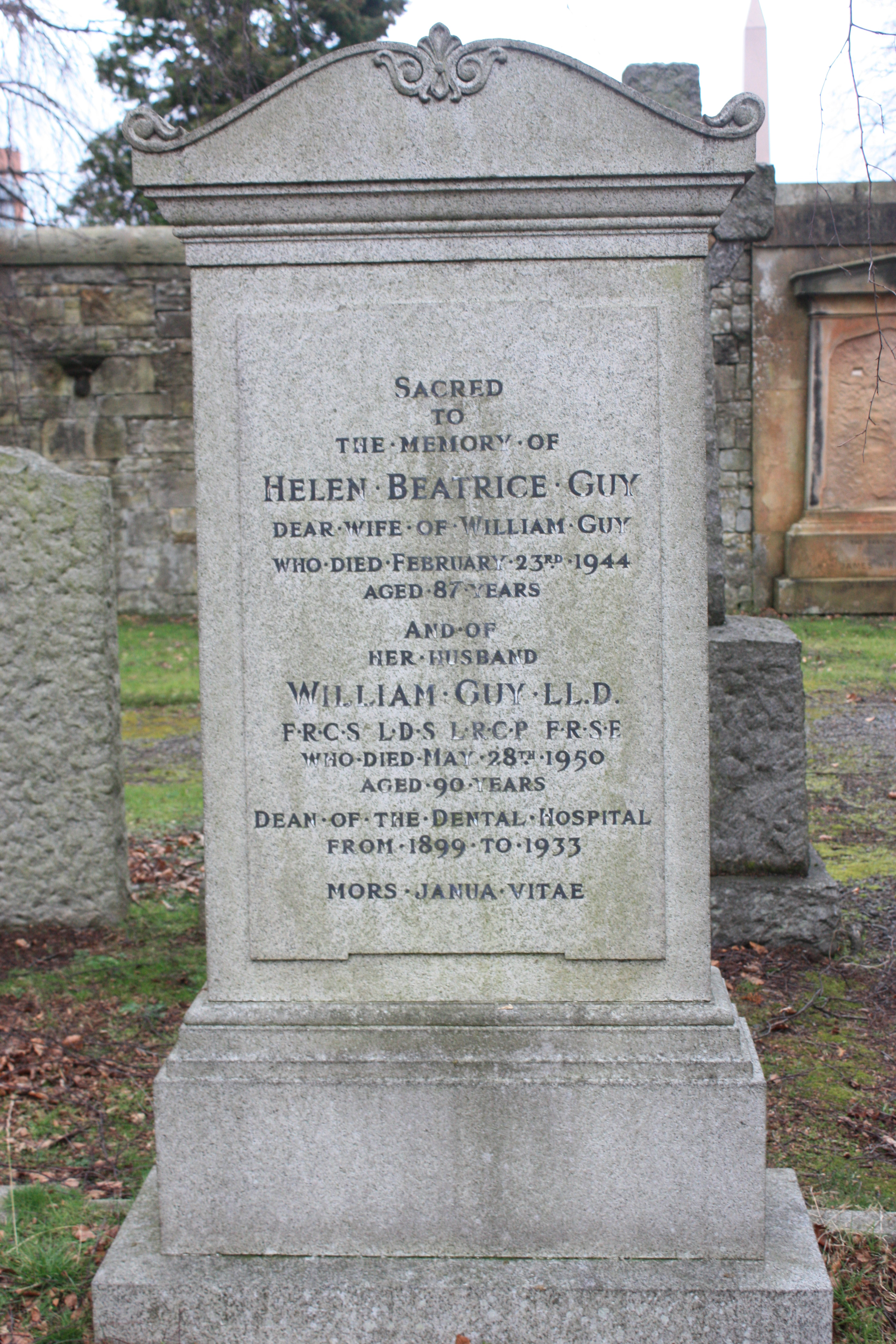
The grave of William Guy, Dean Cemetery

William Guy FRSE FRCS BDA FDS LLD (1859-1950) was a British pioneer of modern dentistry and the widespread use of anaesthesia. He was instrumental in the creation of the 1921 Dentists Act in the United Kingdom.

== Life ==
He was born in Biddenden in Kent on 3 December 1859, the son of Dr William Guy of Norwich, and attended Norwich Grammar School. He received a Licentiate from the Royal College of Surgeons of Edinburgh in 1892 In 1899 he succeeded William Bowman MacLeod as Dean of the Edinburgh Dental Hospital and served this role for 40 years. The final 5 years (1935-1939) were in a transition period with Arthur Cyril William Hutchison, who eventually replaced him fully in 1939.

From October 1899, (prior to its customary use in clinical surgery) he was the first person to employ permanent anaesthetists in the UK. At the peak of his career, he was practising from a surgery at 11 Wemyss Place in western Edinburgh. The property had previously been the dental practice of John Smith.

In 1894, he was elected a member of the Harveian Society of Edinburgh. In May 1911, he was elected a Fellow of the Royal Society of Edinburgh. His proposers included William Spiers Bruce and Thomas Smith Clouston.

In 1914, he was elected President of the British Dental Association. In the First World War he served as a military surgeon, at home in Scotland, being employed at Craigleith Hospital (the Second Scottish Military Hospital), specialising in facial reconstruction. In 1917 he was promoted to Major.

He died in Edinburgh in 1950 and is buried with his wife Beatrice in a north section of the original Dean Cemetery in western Edinburgh.

== Memorials ==
The William Guy Memorial Lecture is named in his memory.

== Publications ==
- Mostly Memories – Some Digressions autobiography (1948)

== Family ==
Guy married Helen Beatrice Smith in 1895. They had no children.
