= Harry Guy =

Australian rules footballer (1881–1958)

Personal information
- Full name: Henry Augustus Guy
- Born: 4 June 1881; Hamilton, Tasmania
- Died: 10 January 1958 (aged 76)
- Original team: North Launceston

Playing career^{1}
Years	Club	Games (Goals)
1903	South Melbourne	4 (0)
- ^{1} Playing statistics correct to the end of 1903.

Harry Augustus Guy (4 June 1881 – 10 January 1958) was an Australian rules footballer who played with South Melbourne in the Victorian Football League (VFL).

== Football ==
Recruited from North Launceston, Guy made four appearances for South at the start of the 1903 season before returning to Tasmania by the middle of the year.
