= Charles H. Guy =

American-football player (1924–2010)

Biographical details
- Born: February 5, 1924; Pittsburgh, Pennsylvania, U.S.
- Died: May 22, 2010 (aged 86); Tampa, Florida, U.S.

Playing career

Football
- 1945: Navy

Lacrosse
- 1946: Navy

Coaching career (HC unless noted)

Football
- 1949: Virginia (assistant)
- 1950: Johns Hopkins

Lacrosse
- 1949–1950: Virginia

Head coaching record
- Overall: 3–4–1 (football); 15–7 (lacrosse)

Charles Howgate Guy Jr. (February 5, 1924 – May 22, 2010) was an American college football and college lacrosse player and coach. He served as the head football coach at Johns Hopkins University in 1950 and as the head lacrosse coach at the University of Virginia from 1949 to 1950. Charlie was born on February 5, 1924, in Pittsburgh, Pennsylvania. He attended New Trier High School in Chicago, IL, where he was an exceptional football player.

== Head coaching record ==
=== Football ===
Year	Team	Overall	Conference	Standing	Bowl/playoffs
Johns Hopkins Blue Jays (Mason–Dixon Conference) (1950)
1950	Johns Hopkins	3–4–1	0–2–1	8th	
Johns Hopkins:		3–4–1	0–2–1		
Total:		3–4–1			
