= Dick Guy =

Australian cricketer

Personal information
- Full name: Richard Henry Guy
- Born: 4 April 1937; Sydney, Australia
- Died: 16 May 2018 (aged 81)
- Batting: Right-handed
- Bowling: Right-arm leg-break and googly

Domestic team information
- Years: Team
- 1960-61 to 1968-69: New South Wales

Career statistics
| Competition | First-class |
|---|---|
| Matches | 8 |
| Runs scored | 92 |
| Batting average | 9.20 |
| 100s/50s | 0/0 |
| Top score | 19 |
| Balls bowled | 1533 |
| Wickets | 25 |
| Bowling average | 27.88 |
| 5 wickets in innings | 0 |
| 10 wickets in match | 0 |
| Best bowling | 4/64 |
| Catches/stumpings | 3/– |
- Source: Cricinfo, 3 June 2018

Dick Guy (4 April 1937 – 16 May 2018) was an Australian cricketer. A leg-spin bowler, he played eight first-class matches for New South Wales between 1960/61 and 1968/69.

== See also ==
- List of New South Wales representative cricketers
