= Dickie Guy =

English football goalkeeper

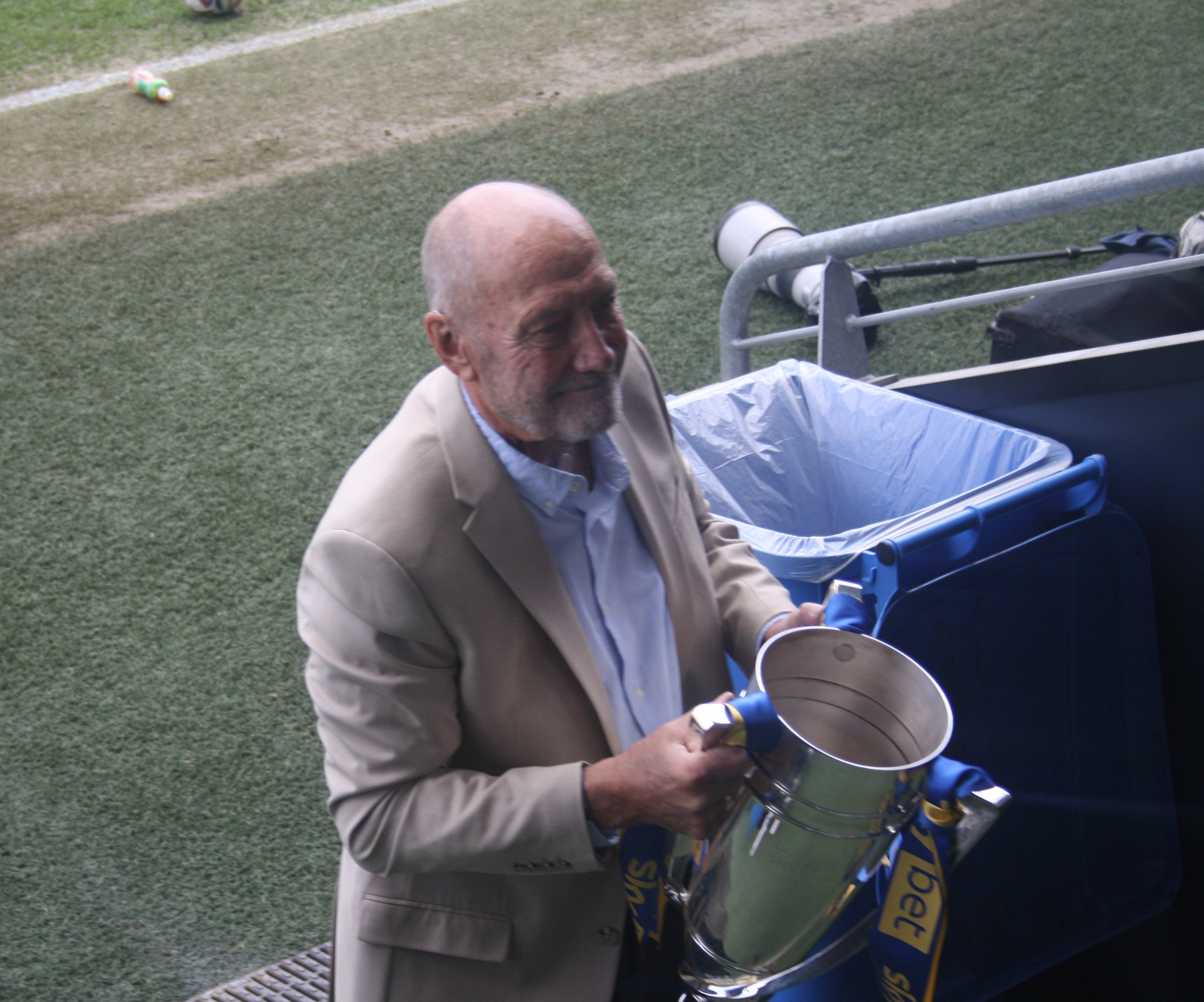
- Dickie Guy lifting the EFL play-off's trophy.

Personal information
- Full name: Richard John Guy
- Date of birth: 6 January 1949 (age 77)
- Place of birth: Greenwich, London, England

Youth career
- Millwall
- Tooting & Mitcham United

Senior career*
Years	Team	Apps	(Gls)
1967–1978	Wimbledon	371	(0)
1978–1979	Maidstone United	26	(0)
1979–1980	Carshalton Athletic	1	(0)
- * Club domestic league appearances and goals

Richard John Guy (born 6 January 1949) is an English former footballer who played as a goalkeeper for Wimbledon during the 1960s and 1970s. Today, Guy is the President of AFC Wimbledon, the supporter-owned club which represents Wimbledon.

== Playing career ==
Guy made nearly 600 first team appearances for Wimbledon between 1967 and 1978. He was signed from local rivals Tooting & Mitcham United who had taken him on as a junior from Millwall. During his Wimbledon career, he once made 275 consecutive appearances, and only missed a single game in a run of 449 consecutive matches between January 1970 and August 1977.

Guy shot to national fame during the then non-league club's spectacular 1975 FA Cup run, initially keeping a clean sheet as the Dons knocked out First Division Burnley at Turf Moor in the third round, thus becoming the first non-league club in a century to beat a First Division team on their own ground. But it was in the fourth round that Guy became a Dons legend, with a heroic display at Elland Road, not only keeping another clean sheet but, most famously, saving a Peter Lorimer penalty to earn Wimbledon a replay against reigning English Champions, Leeds United. In the replay, he was again superb and was eventually only beaten by a single deflected own goal.

When Wimbledon were elected to The Football League in 1977, he made a total of 19 appearances for the club before deciding that he wished to remain a semi-professional player, rather than give up his successful career outside football. His final game for Wimbledon was at Plough Lane against Torquay United on 21 February 1978. At the end of the season, in recognition of his devoted service to the club he was awarded a testimonial match against Chelsea on 11 April 1978.

He moved to Maidstone United after leaving Wimbledon and played in their F.A. Cup tie against Charlton Athletic at The Valley, which saw two Charlton players (Mike Flanagan and Derek Hales) sent off for fighting each other. The match ended in a 1–1 draw. Maidstone lost the replay 2–1.

== More recently ==
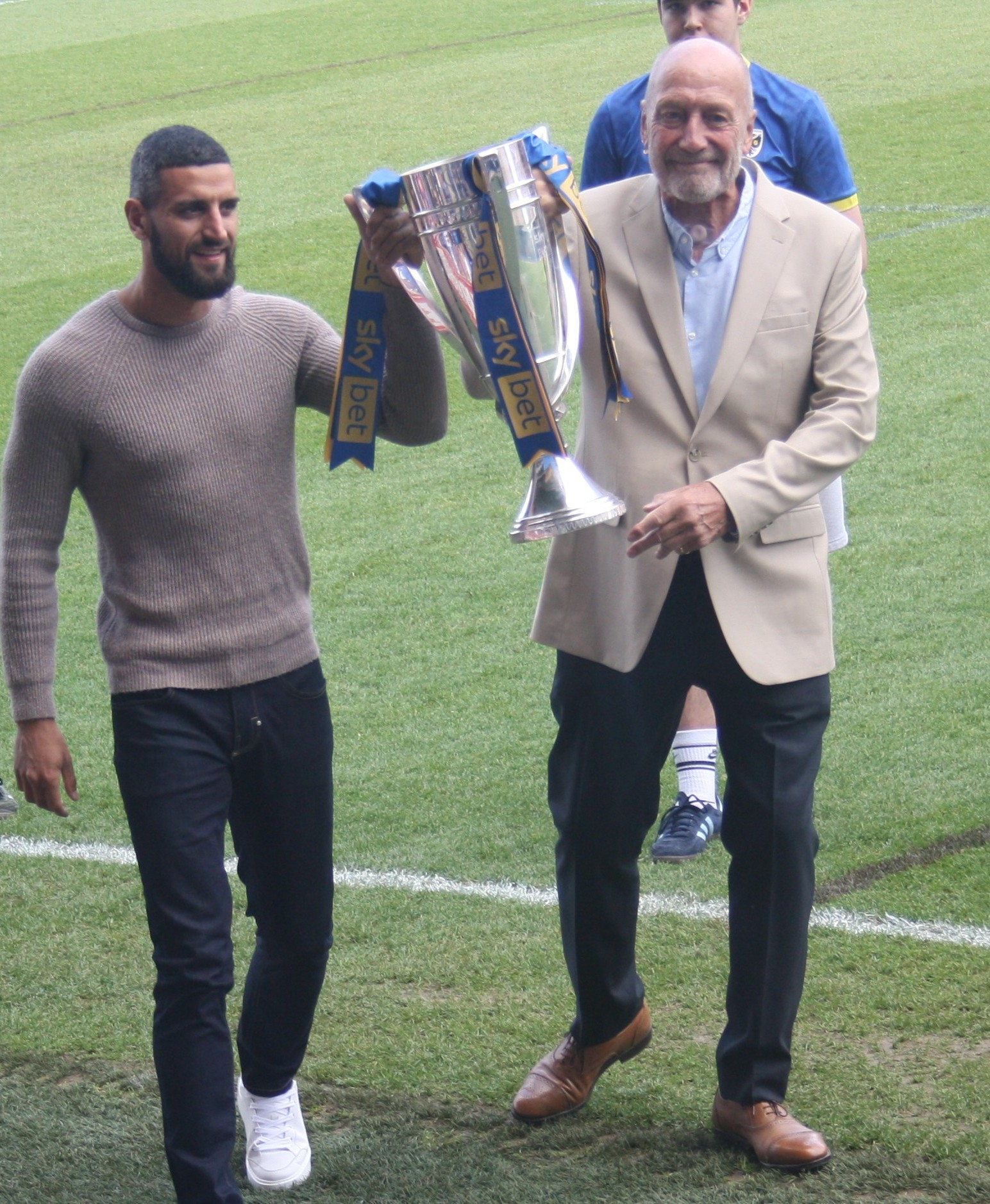
Dickie Guy (right) and Omar Bugiel parading the Play-Off Final Trophy after beating Walsall 1-0 to get promoted to League One.

As a renowned former player, Dickie Guy was a very outspoken opponent of the club's proposed re-location to Milton Keynes, and their subsequent re-branding as Milton Keynes Dons. He was a popular choice among Wimbledon fans when appointed as President of AFC Wimbledon in 2004.

Guy made a brief comeback playing for a Wimbledon old boys team against a rival Liverpool team at a charity event at Kingsmeadow in 2004.

On 21 April 2010, Guy suffered a serious heart attack and was subsequently taken to hospital and operated on.

On 16 July 2021 it was announced that he was to receive the Freedom of the Borough of Merton in September 2021.
