= Robert Guy (athlete) =

Trinidad and Tobago sprinter

Personal information
- Born: February 21, 1964 (age 62) Trinidad, Trinidad and Tobago

Sport
- Sport: Track and field
Medal record
Representing Trinidad and Tobago
Pan American Games
Bronze medal – third place	1995 Mar del Plata	4x400m relay

Robert Guy (born February 21, 1964) is a retired athlete from Trinidad and Tobago who specialized in the 400 metres. He attended Abilene Christian College, Texas, US.

== Achievements ==
Year	Competition	Venue	Position	Event	Notes
Representing Trinidad and Tobago
1991	Pan American Games	Havana, Cuba	4th	4 × 400 m relay	
1995	Pan American Games	Mar del Plata, Argentina	3rd	4 × 400 m relay	
