= John Hudson Guy =

Chief Justice of Jamaica

John Hudson Guy was Chief Justice of Jamaica in 1749.
