= John Guy (English cricketer) =

English cricketer

John Bernard Guy (16 May 1916 – 7 February 1997) was an English first-class cricketer who played for Oxford University, Kent and Warwickshire in nine matches before and after the Second World War. He was born in Ramsgate in Kent in 1916 and died at Bournville in Birmingham in 1997 aged 80.

Guy played as a right-handed middle-order batsman and appeared in six matches for Oxford University, where he studied at Brasenose College, in 1938 and 1939 without cementing a place in the first team or winning a Blue. His best innings was 45 runs against Glamorgan in 1938, but in 15 other first-class innings he did not reach 20. He played a single match for Kent in 1938 and re-appeared in first-class cricket in two games for Warwickshire in 1950; at this stage, he was a schoolmaster at King Edward's School, Birmingham.

== Bibliography ==
- Carlaw, Derek (2020). Kent County Cricketers, A to Z: Part Two (1919–1939) (PDF). Cardiff: ACS.
