= Robert Guy (Royal Navy officer) =

Robert Lincoln Guy LVO was educated at Radley College and entered the Royal Navy in 1966. After training and subsequent service in two frigates, he was aide-de-camp to the Governor of Gibraltar in 1972 and then commanded successively HMS Ashton and HMS Kedleston, both of the Fishery Protection Squadron. He qualified as a Warfare Officer in 1975 and then was the Operations Officer of HMS Arrow. Guy was Equerry to Queen Elizabeth II from 1977 to 1980.

Guy returned to sea in 1981, as second in command, first of HMS Antelope, from which he was last off minutes before she blew up during the Falklands War, and then of HMS Liverpool. After promotion to commander, he commanded the towed-array frigate HMS Sirius in 1983 and 1984. After the Joint Service Defence College and a short period as senior naval officer, Falkland Islands, Guy held a number of key staff appointments, mainly in London, as the fleet programming officer, the naval assistant to the chief of fleet support, the head of maritime intelligence and then, finally, the senior naval member of the staff of the Joint Services Defence College at Greenwich.

He resigned early from the Navy in 1997 and became the executive director of The Japan Society, which appointment he held for 10 years, resigning in 2007. In 2000, he also became executive director of The Hong Kong Association, The Hong Kong Society and The Universities’ China Committee in London. He now remains the executive director of the last three and is a consultant to The Japan Society.

His main sport over 30 years has been polo, which he stopped playing in 1992; during his time as captain of Naval Polo, the Navy won, for the first time in its history, the Inter-Regimental Cup, the premier services tournament.

Guy is married and has two daughters. He was made a Lieutenant of the Royal Victorian Order (LVO) in 1980.
