= Gary Guy =

Australian rules footballer

Personal information
- Full name: Gary Guy
- Born: 12 July 1952 (age 74)
- Original team: Carrum
- Height: 175 cm (5 ft 9 in)
- Weight: 78 kg (172 lb)

Playing career^{1}
Years	Club	Games (Goals)
1975–76	Melbourne	22 (8)
- ^{1} Playing statistics correct to the end of 1976.

Gary Guy (born 12 July 1952) is a former Australian rules footballer who played with Melbourne in the Victorian Football League (VFL) and Dandenong Football Club (VFA).

Guy was recruited by Melbourne from the Carrum Football Club, where he had captained Carrum to back-to-back Mornington Peninsula Football League (MPFL) premierships in 1973–74 while coached by his father Ivan Guy. He finished second in the 1974 MPFL best and fairest count behind teammate Ron Stubbs.

Guy would make his VFL debut for Melbourne in round 1 of the 1975 VFL season, playing in 15 consecutive matches before injuring his shoulder. He would leave Melbourne at the end of the 1976 season, later playing in the VFA with Frankston and Dandenong.
