= Charles A. Guy =

American journalist

Charles A. Guy (died 1985) was the longtime owner and editor of the Lubbock Avalanche-Journal.

== Biography ==
Charles Guy founded the Lubbock Daily Journal with partner Dorrance Roderick, and in 1926 bought the rival newspaper The Lubbock Avalanche from John James Dillard and Thad Tubbs to form the Lubbock Avalanche-Journal. He served as editor and publisher of the Lubbock Avalanche-Journal from 1931 to 1972.

He was described as an "utter realist" in his approach by journalist Erwin Canham.

The Charles A. Guy Park in Lubbock, Texas is named after him.
