= Deaths in October 1994 =

The following is a list of notable deaths in October 1994.

Entries for each day are listed alphabetically by surname. A typical entry lists information in the following sequence:

- Name, age, country of citizenship at birth, subsequent country of citizenship (if applicable), reason for notability, cause of death (if known), and reference.

== October 1994 ==
=== 1 ===
- David Berg, 75, American founder and leader of religious movement The Family International.
- Georges Delporte, 82, French Olympic water polo player (1936).
- Ignazio Dionisi, 82, Italian Olympic ice hockey player (1936, 1948).
- Ron Herron, 64, English architect and teacher.
- Bud Houser, 93, American field athlete and Olympian (1924, 1928).
- Donald Roy Irvine, 74, Canadian politician.
- Oluyemi Kayode, 26, Nigerian sprinter and Olympian (1992), traffic collision.
- Paul Lorenzen, 79, German philosopher and mathematician.
- Marjorie Weaver, 81, American actress, heart attack.

=== 2 ===
- Matthew Black, 86, Scottish minister and biblical scholar.
- Toby Caston, 29, American football player (Houston Oilers, Detroit Lions).
- Claude Harris, Jr., 54, American politician, member of the United States House of Representatives (1987-1993).
- Harry Hodgkinson, 81, British writer, journalist, and naval intelligence officer.
- Harriet Nelson, 85, American singer and actress (The Adventures of Ozzie and Harriet), heart failure.
- Lyall Williams, 88, Australian rules footballer.

=== 3 ===
- Tim Asch, 62, American anthropologist, photographer, and ethnographic filmmaker, cancer.
- Virginia Dale, 77, American actress and dancer.
- William Daniel Murray, 85, American district judge (United States District Court for the District of Montana).
- Lassi Parkkinen, 77, Finnish speed skater and Olympian (1948, 1952).
- Phil Ragazzo, 79, American football player (Cleveland Rams, Philadelphia Eagles, New York Giants).
- Heinz Rühmann, 92, German film actor.
- Prince Max Emanuel of Thurn and Taxis, 92, German Benedictine and nobleman.
- Dub Taylor, 87, American actor (The Wild Bunch, Bonnie and Clyde, Casey Jones).

=== 4 ===
- Yardena Alotin, 64, Israeli composer and pianist.
- Ted Brewis, 92, Australian rules footballer.
- Bill Challis, 90, American jazz arranger.
- Danny Gatton, 49, American guitarist, suicide.
- Shmuel Merlin, 84, Israeli Revisionist Zionist activist and politician.
- Effat Nagy, 89, Egyptian artist.
- John Opper, 85, American abstract painter.
- Andrea Velis, 62, American operatic tenor.

=== 5 ===
- Lee Gamble, 84, American baseball player (Cincinnati Reds).
- Luc Jouret, 46, Belgian religious cult leader, suicide.
- Gordon Juckes, 80, Canadian ice hockey administrator.
- Dientje Meijer-Haantjes, 76, Dutch Olympic gymnast (1948).
- Nini Rosso, 68, Italian jazz trumpeter and composer, lung cancer.
- Walt Schlinkman, 72, American gridiron football player (Green Bay Packers), and coach.
- Bill Shaw, 79, Australian rules footballer.
- William R. Smedberg III, 92, United States Navy vice admiral.
- Jacques Tarride, 91, French actor.
- Doug Wildey, 72, American comic book artist and television writer (Jonny Quest).

=== 6 ===
- Jo Colruyt, 66, Belgian businessman.
- Per Mørch Hansson, 89, Norwegian sportsman and businessman.
- G. Joseph Tauro, 88, American judge and Chief justice (1970-1976).
- Tadeusz Żakiej, 79, Polish musicologist and music publicist, and food writer.

=== 7 ===
- Piotr Alberti, 80, Soviet/Russian painter.
- Maya Bulgakovа, 62, Soviet/Russian actress, traffic collision.
- Bruce Cork, 78, American physicist.
- Ray Ellefson, 72, American basketball player (Minneapolis Lakers, New York Knicks).
- Stan Ferens, 79, American baseball player (St. Louis Browns).
- Jack Fitzgerald, 80, Irish Labour Party politician.
- Carlos Gracie, 92, Brazilian martial artist.
- Viktors Hatuļevs, 39, Soviet/Latvian ice hockey defenseman and left winger.
- James Hill, 75, British film and television director, screenwriter and producer.
- Niels Kaj Jerne, 82, Danish immunologist.
- Maurício do Valle, 66, Brazilian film actor, diabetes.

=== 8 ===
- Anthony Abell, 87, British colonial official.
- Diana Churchill, 81, English actress, multiple sclerosis.
- Brian Hartley, 55, British mathematician specialising in group theory, heart attack.
- Khaled al-Hassan, 66, Palestinian politician, adviser of Yasser Arafat and founder of militant organization Fatah.
- Alan M. Holman, 89, American football player and coach.
- Jan de Koning, 68, Dutch politician and social geographer, cancer.
- John Neely, 64, American jazz tenor saxophonist and arranger.

=== 9 ===
- Raich Carter, 80, English sportsman.
- Tony Falkenstein, 79, American football player (Green Bay Packers, Brooklyn Tigers, Boston Yanks).
- Bill Fox, 95, New Zealand politician.
- Idris Hopkins, 83, Welsh football player.
- Nikolai Karetnikov, 64, Soviet /Russian composer of underground music.
- Fred Lebow, 62, American runner and race director.
- Philip Burton Moon, 87, British nuclear physicist.
- Lawrence Simmons, 83, American football and baseball coach.
- Rolf Thiele, 76, German film director, producer and screenwriter.
- Corneille Wellens, 89, Belgian field hockey player and Olympian (1928, 1936).

=== 10 ===
- Richard J. C. Atkinson, 74, British prehistorian and archaeologist.
- John C. Champion, 70, American producer and screenwriter.
- Nola Luxford, 92, New Zealand-American film actress.
- Allen Nilan, 81, Australian rules footballer.
- SM Sultan, 71, Bangladeshi painter.

=== 11 ===
- Bobby Brooks, 48, American baseball player (Oakland Athletics, California Angels).
- Charlie Cuellar, 77, American baseball player (Chicago White Sox).
- Harry Harley, 78, Australian rules footballer.
- Jarvis Hunt, 90, American politician.
- Keiji Imai, 77, Japanese Olympic sprinter (1936).
- Ahmadiyya Jabrayilov, 74, French Resistance member.
- Frank McGuire, 79, American basketball coach (St. John's Red Storm, North Carolina Tar Heels, South Carolina Gamecocks).

=== 12 ===
- John Blackburn, 61, British politician.
- Raymond Garrett, 93, Australian military officer, photographer, and politician.
- Gérald Godin, 55, Quebec poet and politician.
- John Harding, 62, Australian rules footballer.
- Aslam Khan, 76, Pakistani brigadier, captured Kennedy Peak (Myanmar) during WWII
- Werner Kubitzki, 79, German Olympic field hockey player (1936).
- Manole Marcus, 66, Romanian film director and screenwriter.
- Yakov Punkin, 72, Ukrainian featherweight Greco-Roman wrestler and Olympian (1952).
- Sady Rebbot, 59, French actor, cancer.

=== 13 ===
- Fiodar Fiodaraŭ, 83, Soviet/Belarusian physicist.
- Ture Königson, 84, Swedish evangelical politician.
- Eric Morse, 5, American murder victim, fall.
- Samuel Jacob Sesanus Olsen, 90, Faroese teacher, writer and translator.
- Guido Wolf, 70, Liechtensteiner Olympic sports shooter (1960).

=== 14 ===
- Monte Brethauer, 63, American football player (Baltimore Colts).
- Gioconda de Vito, 87, Italian-British violinist.
- Harry Fleer, 78, American actor.
- Ken Jordan, 82, American basketball player.
- Neil Kennedy-Cochran-Patrick, 68, British Olympic sailor (1952, 1956).
- Setu Madhavrao Pagdi, 84, Indian civil servant, polyglot, and historian.
- Nikolai Skomorokhov, 74, Soviet Air Forces flying ace during World War II, traffic collision.
- Karl Edward Wagner, 48, American writer, poet, editor, and publisher.
- Petar Šegedin, 68, Yugoslav steeplechase, long-distance runner, and Olympian (1948, 1952).
- Ada Valerie-Tal, 58, Israeli actress (Bar 51), heart disease.

=== 15 ===
- Avis Acres, 84, New Zealand artist, writer, illustrator and conservationist.
- Wally Culpitt, 76, Australian rules footballer.
- Jean Dasté, 90, French actor and theatre director.
- Bernie Hore, 78, Australian rules footballer.
- Sarah Kofman, 60, French philosopher, suicide.
- George Meader, 87, American politician, member of the United States House of Representatives (1951-1965).
- Jozo Tomasevich, 86, American economist and military historian.

=== 16 ===
- Joan Airey, 68, British Olympic artistic gymnast (1948).
- Kunigunde Bachl, 75, German physician and politician, member of the Landtag of Schleswig-Holstein
- Peter Bromilow, 61, English actor (Camelot, The Railway Children, The Rocketeer).
- Ed Cody, 71, American football player (Green Bay Packers, Chicago Bears), and coach.
- Monja Danischewsky, 83, British producer and writer.
- Michela Fanini, 21, Italian racing cyclist, traffic collision.
- Ganesh Ghosh, 94, Indian independence activist, revolutionary and politician.
- Dewey Halford, 75, American football coach and athletics commissioner. (Morningside University).
- Josef Kraft, 73, German Luftwaffe pilot during World War II and later an officer in the German Air Force.
- Barney McKellar, 54, Australian rules footballer.

=== 17 ===
- P. M. Aboobacker, Indian politician.
- George Barrows, 80, American actor.
- John Ellis, 80, Australian cricketer.
- Ralph Hill, 86, American runner and Olympian (1932).
- Dmitry Kholodov, 27, Russian journalist, homicide.
- Joe Paparella, 85, American baseball umpire.
- Gus Risman, 83, Welsh rugby player.

=== 18 ===
- Herman Ahlsell, 75, Swedish director and actor.
- Lee Allen, 67, American tenor saxophone player.
- Walker Lee Cisler, 97, American engineer and business executive.
- Xavier Depraz, 68, French opera singer and actor.
- Else Klink, 86, German Eurythmist.
- Eddie Mast, 46, American basketball player (New York Knicks, Atlanta Hawks).
- Conchita Montes, 80, Spanish film actress.
- Max Müller, 88, German philosopher and Catholic intellectual.
- Li Qingwei, 74, People's Republic of China politician.

=== 19 ===
- Frank J. Battisti, 72, American district judge (United States District Court for the Northern District of Ohio).
- Ray Birdwhistell, 76, American anthropologist.
- Oldřich Černík, 72, Czech politician and Prime minister of Czechoslovakia.
- Hedi Flitz, 94, German politician.
- M. C. M. Kaleel, 94, Ceylonese physician, social worker and politician.
- Jacopo Napoli, 83, Italian composer.
- Martha Raye, 78, American comic actress and singer, pneumonia.
- Nyanaponika Thera, 93, German-born Theravada Buddhist monk and scholar.

=== 20 ===
- Sergei Bondarchuk, 74, Soviet/Russian actor, film director, and screenwriter, heart attack.
- Shlomo Carlebach, 69, Jewish rabbi, spiritual leader, composer, and singer, heart attack.
- Viola Gråsten, 83, Swedish textile designer.
- Barbara Ingram, 46, American R&B singer and songwriter.
- Hakob Karapents, 69, Iranian-Armenian author.
- Mike Kasap, 71, American football player (Baltimore Colts).
- Burt Lancaster, 80, American actor (From Here to Eternity, Elmer Gantry, Birdman of Alcatraz), Oscar winner (1961), heart attack.
- Robert Medley, 88, English artist.
- Georges Poffé, 62-63, Belgian Olympic equestrian (1956).
- Giacomo Rossi-Stuart, 69, Italian film actor.
- Francis Steegmuller, 88, American biographer, translator and fiction writer.

=== 21 ===
- Bunny Adair, 89, Australian politician.
- Richard Harvey Chambers, 87, American circuit judge (United States Court of Appeals for the Ninth Circuit).
- Thore Ehrling, 81, Swedish trumpeter, composer, and bandleader.
- George H. Gay, 77, United States Navy bomber pilot during World War II.
- Jerome Wiesner, 79, American engineer and president of MIT.

=== 22 ===
- Wali Ahmed, Bangladesh Awami League politician.
- William Frankena, 86, American moral philosopher.
- Engelbert Holderied, 70, German Olympic ice hockey player (1952).
- Harold Hopkins, 75, British physicist.
- Handel Manuel, 76, Indian pianist, organist, conductor, composer and accompanist.
- Rollo May, 85, American existential psychologist and author.
- Jimmy Miller, 52, American record producer and musician, liver disease.
- Rastko Poljšak, 95, Yugoslavian Olympic gymnast (1924).
- Benoît Régent, 41, French actor, aneurysm.
- Andrea Zambelli, 67, Italian bobsledder.

=== 23 ===
- Ray Conger, 89, American middle-distance runner and Olympian (1928).
- Albino Crespi, 64, Italian racing cyclist.
- Jean-Claude Druart, 67, French Olympic footballer (1952).
- Jack Gibson, 86, English schoolmaster, academic and mountaineer.
- Robert Lansing, 66, American actor (12 O'Clock High. The Equalizer, Kung Fu: The Legend Continues), cancer.
- Bill Leonard, 78, American journalist and television executive, stroke.
- Yisroel Ber Odesser, 106, Israeli Breslover Hasid and rabbi.
- Cornelis Pama, 77, Dutch bookseller, publisher, heraldist and genealogist.

=== 24 ===
- René Clermont, 72, French stage and film actor and playwright.
- Sólo̱n Zéfyros Gri̱goriádi̱s, 82, Greek Navy officer, journalist, writer and politician.
- George Hecht, 74, American football player (Chicago Rockets).
- Hans Jacobs, 87, German sailplane designer and pioneer.
- Edward St John, 78, Australian barrister, anti-nuclear activist and politician.
- Raul Julia, 54, Puerto Rican actor (Kiss of the Spider Woman, The Addams Family, Presumed Innocent), Emmy winner (1995), stroke.
- John Lautner, 83, American architect.
- Ian Potter, 92, Australian stockbroker, businessman and philanthropist.
- Guy Powles, 89, New Zealand diplomat, and New Zealand's first Ombudsman.
- Alexander Shelepin, 76, Soviet politician and security and intelligence officer.
- Notable people killed in the 1994 Colombo suicide attack
  - Ossie Abeygunasekera, 44, Sri Lankan politician and Member of Parliament
  - Gamini Dissanayake, 52, Sri Lankan politician and Leader of the Opposition
  - Weerasinghe Mallimaratchi, 64, Sri Lankan politician and cabinet minister
  - G. M. Premachandra, 54, Sri Lankan politician and cabinet minister

=== 25 ===
- Yang Dezhi, 83, Chinese general and politician.
- George Fallon, 80, American baseball player (Brooklyn Dodgers, St. Louis Cardinals).
- Bob Gantt, 72, American basketball player.
- Thomas Gibbs Gee, 68, American circuit judge (United States Court of Appeals for the Fifth Circuit).
- Emil Grünig, 79, Swiss Olympic sport shooter (1948).
- Lillian Hayman, 72, American actress and singer, heart attack.
- Kara Hultgreen, 29, American naval aviator, plane crash.
- Hou Jingru, 92, Chinese Army officer and politician.
- Antal Kocsis, 88, Hungarian boxer and Olympian (1928).
- József Kozma, 69, Hungarian Olympic basketball player (1948).
- Jack Mathews, 80, Australian rules footballer.
- Karl-Heinz Metzner, 71, German football player.
- Mildred Natwick, 89, American actress (Barefoot in the Park, Dangerous Liaisons, The Snoop Sisters), Emmy winner (1974), cancer.
- Frank Spaniel, 66, American gridiron football player (Washington Redskins, Baltimore Colts).

=== 26 ===
- Norma Dee Edwards, 82, American politician.
- Wilbert Harrison, 65, American rhythm and blues musician, stroke.
- Herbert Holba, 62, Austrian film director and screenwriter.
- Stella Kübler, 72, German Jewish woman and Gestapo collaborator during WorldWar II, suicide by drowning.
- Gunnar Palm, 79, Swedish Olympic equestrian (1952).
- Tutta Rolf, 87, Norwegian-Swedish film and theatre actress and singer.

=== 27 ===
- Kay Bell, 80, American gridiron football player (Chicago Bears, New York Giants), cancer.
- Elwood Cook, 65, American soccer player and Olympian (1952).
- Wally Halder, 69, Canadian ice hockey player and Olympian (1948).
- James Schwarzenbach, 83, Swiss right-wing politician and publicist.
- Omar Wahrouch, 68, Moroccan singer-poet and songwriter.
- Robert White, 57, American soul musician and a guitarist (Funk Brothers).

=== 28 ===
- William Boon, 83, British chemist.
- Marcia Anastasia Christoforides, 85, British philanthropist, art collector, and racehorse owner.
- Calvin Souther Fuller, 92, American physical chemist at AT&T Bell Laboratories.
- Roger Jansson, 35, Swedish Olympic sports shooter (1984).
- Doghmi Larbi, 63, Moroccan actor.
- Ramakrushna Nanda, 88, Indian writer, educator and children's author.
- Irene Robertson, 62, American Olympic hurdler (1956, 1960).
- Charles E. Stewart Jr., 78, American district judge (United States District Court for the Southern District of New York).

=== 29 ===
- Shlomo Goren, 76, Polish-Israeli Orthodox Religious Zionist rabbi and Talmudic scholar.
- Ernst Heinrichsohn, 74, German lawyer and SS officer during World War II.
- Jalmari Kivenheimo, 105, Finnish Olympic gymnast (1912).
- Oscar Midtlyng, 88, Norwegian Olympic high jumper (1928).
- Manuel Barbachano Ponce, 69, Mexican film producer, director, and screenwriter.
- Pearl Primus, 74, American dancer, choreographer and anthropologist.
- Mat Ryan, 81, Australian rugby league footballer.

=== 30 ===
- Piero Baglia-Bamberghi, 66, Italian Olympic field hockey player (1952).
- Frank Coggins, 50, American baseball player (Washington Senators, Chicago Cubs).
- Oakley C. Collins, 78, American politician.
- Miguel García, 97, Spanish Olympic runner (1920).
- Nicholas Georgescu-Roegen, 88, Romanian mathematician, statistician and economist, diabetes.
- Guy Middleton, 94, French Olympic swimmer (1924).
- Swaran Singh, 87, Indian politician, heart attack.

=== 31 ===
- Hal Ellson, 84, American author of pulp fiction, heart attack.
- John Pope-Hennessy, 80, British art historian.
- George Powell-Shedden, 78, British RAF pilot and Olympic bobsledder (1948).
- Lester Sill, 76, American record label executive.
- Erling Stordahl, 71, Norwegian farmer and singer.
