= Maryborough Football Club =

Australian rules football and netball club

Names
- Full name: Maryborough Football Club
- Nickname: Magpies

2023 season
- After finals: N/A
- Home-and-away season: 10th (last)

Club details
- Founded: 1872; 154 years ago
- Colours
- Competition: Bendigo Football League (BFL)
- President: Kelvin Noonan
- Premierships: 14: MFA, 1892, 1894, 1908, BFL 1924, 1925, 1927, 1931, 1960, 1965, 1968, 1972, 1974 BFL: 1998, 1999
- Ground: Princes Park

Uniforms
Home

Other information
- Official website: https://maryboroughfnc.com.au/

The Maryborough Football & Netball Club, nicknamed the Magpies, is an Australian rules football and netball club based in the town of Maryborough, Victoria.

The club is currently a member of the Bendigo Football Netball League. However, they have been in recess since 2025. In 2027 they will join the Maryborough Castlemaine District Football Netball League

== History ==
An Australian Rules football club was tried to be formed in Maryborough in 1869, but was unsuccessful, then in 1872, the club was formed and three matches were played against Avoca.

In 1891, the Maryborough Albion Junior FC played 15 games, for 14 wins, one draw to be premiers of the Maryborough district.

Maryborough joined the Ballarat Football League in 1924 and were premiers on four occasions between 1924 and 1931 but missed both the 1929 and 1930 seasons as they were without a home ground. The council had decided to allocate Princes Park to the Maryborough District Football Association (MDFA).

In August, 1928, Marborough player, Charlie Backway kicked 18 goals against Ballarat Imperial FC.

After returning and winning the 1931 premiership, Maryborough applied to join the Bendigo Football League in 1932 and were suspended by the Ballarat Football League as a result, who refused to clear the club to the Bendigo Football League.

To get around the disqualification, a new club was formed, called Maryborough United FC and they participated in the Bendigo Football League, from 1932 to 1940, due to Maryborough FC's disqualification.

The original club reformed in 1945, spent a season in the Maryborough District Football Association (MDFA), before returning to the Ballarat Football League in 1946.

At the end of 1991 the club were successful in transferring to the Bendigo Football League.

Football Timeline

- 1872 - 1891: Maryborough FC formed in 1872, club active playing matches against local towns, but no competition football.
- 1892 - 1894: Maryborough District Football Association formed in 1892.
- 1895 - 1898: Maryborough District Football Association? Club active, but no competition football?
- 1899 - 1900: Maryborough District Football Association
- 1901 - 1903: Maryborough District Football Association ?
- 1904 - 1910: Maryborough District Football Association
- 1911 - 1915: Maryborough FC appears to be in recess. Maryborough Temperance FC, Maryborough Railways FC and Bristol Hill FC (Maryborough) all active in the Maryborough DFA.
- 1916 - 1918: Association & club in recess due to World War One
- 1919 - 1923: Club in recess
- 1924 - 1928: Ballarat Football League
- 1929 & 1930: Club in recess. Maryborough FC was forced into recess, after the local council did not provide the club with the lease of their home ground, Princes Park.
- 1931: Ballarat Football League
- 1932 - 1940: Bendigo Football League, as Maryborough United FC.
- 1941 - 1944: League and club in recess, due to World War Two
- 1945: Maryborough District Football League
- 1946 - 1991: Ballarat Football League
- 1992 - 2019: Bendigo Football League
- 2020: BFNL & club in recess due to COVID-19
- 2021 - 2024: : Bendigo Football League
- 2025-2027- MFNC in recess.
- 2027 Maryborough Castlemaine District Football Netball League

== Football Premierships ==
Seniors

- Maryborough Football Association (1892–1915, 1945):
  - 1892 - Maryborough: 4.6 - 30 defeated Bowenvale: 2.8 - 20
  - 1894 - Maryborough:
  - 1908 - Maryborough: 7.9 - 51 d Carisbrook: 1.0 - 6
- Ballarat Football League (1924–1931, 1946–1991):
  - 1924 - Maryborough: 6.13 - 49 d Ballarat: 6.4 - 40
  - 1925 - Maryborough: 11.12 - 78 d Ballarat: 10.9 - 69
  - 1927 - Maryborough: 6.10 - 40 drew Ballarat: 6.10 - 40
  - 1927 - Maryborough: 8.17 - 65 d Ballarat: 8.12 - 60 (Grand Final Replay)
  - 1931 - Maryborough: 13.24 - 102 d Ballarat Imperial: 11.7 - 73
  - 1960 - Maryborough: 8.12 - 60 d Daylesford: 6.14 - 50
  - 1965 - Maryborough: 13.10 - 88 d Ballarat: 8.8 - 56
  - 1968 - Maryborough: 21.18 - 124 d Ballarat: 9.13 - 68
  - 1972 - Maryborough: 18.12 - 120 d North Ballarat: 9.14 - 68
  - 1974 - Maryborough: 10.12 - 72 d East Ballarat: 9.16 - 70
- Bendigo Football League (1932–1940, 1992–present):
  - 1998 - Maryborough: 19.11 - 125 d Sandhurst: 12.6 - 78
  - 1999 - Maryborough: 20.17 - 137 d Castlemaine: 17.4 - 106

Reserves

- Ballarat Football League (1946–1991)
  - 1959, 1960, 1966, 1985
- Bendigo Football League (1992–present)
  - 2010

Thirds

- Ballarat Football League (1951–1991)
  - 1961, 1963

== Football Runners Up ==
Seniors

- Bendigo Football League (1932–1940, 1992–present)
  - 1933, 1939
- Ballarat Football League (1924–1931, 1946–1991)
  - 1946, 1948, 1949, 1958, 1960, 1961, 1964

Reserves

- Ballarat Football League (1946–1991)
  - 1965, 1974

== League Best & Fairest Winners ==
Senior Football

- Ballarat Football League (1924–1931, 1946–1991):
  - 1948 - H Hubble
  - 1953 - Don Nicholls (as a 16 year old)
  - 1961 - Brian Coleman
  - 1969 - Kevin Coleman
  - 1971 - Colin Elliott
  - 1982 - Rod Fehring
  - 1990 - Geoff MacIlwain
  - 1991 - Geoff MacIlwain
- Bendigo Football League (1932–1940, 1992–present)::
  - 1932 - Stan Nicol
  - 1996 - Jamie Bond
  - 2002 - Matt Aston

== League Leading & / or Century Goalkicker ==
- Ballarat Football League (1924–1931, 1946–1991)
  - 1933 - (2nd:) S. Slater: 111 goals
  - 1949 - Ken Yates: 61
  - 1950 - Bill Wells: 73
  - 1965 - Noel Bishop:
  - 1967 - Noel Bishop:
- Bendigo Football League (1932–1940, 1992–present)
  - 1994 - Shane McCluskey: 100 (113)

== Football Club Best & Fairest Award ==
- Seniors
  - 1924 - Walter Grose
  G. F. Cuttle Memorial Gold Medal

The club's senior football best and fairest award, was initially called the G F Cuttle Memorial Award, who resurrected the club in 1924 and was Maryborough's first president when they joined the Ballarat Football League and was first awarded in 1926. Cuttle received a life membership of the Maryborough FC in April, 1926, just prior to his unfortunate death in June, 1926.

  - 1926 - Ted Waugh
  - 1927 - Colin Niven
  - 1928 - Thomas Rowe
  - 1932 - Stan Nicol
  - 1935 - James Durbridge

== Football Coaches ==
Seniors

- 1873 - Keast
- 1876 - Dood
- 1910 - A R Outrim (captain)
- 1924 & 1925 - Artie Wood
- 1926 - Les Johnson
- 1927 - Colin Watson
- 1928 - Maurie Beasy Appointed as captain-coach, but Carlton did not clear him.
- 1932 - Hugh Donnelly
- 1933 - Bob Makeham
- 1934 - Cecil Kerr
- 1935 - Les Dayman Dayman appointed but did not coach. Gordon Mackie was originally appointed as captain-coach in 1935, but Carlton refused to clear him.
- 1936 - Ted Llewellyn
- 1937 - 1939: Fred Coppock
- 1946 - 1948: Ernie Coward
- 1950 - Bill Wells
- 1951 & 1952 - Don Wilks
- 1953 & 1954: Vic Chanter
- 1960 - 1963: John Haygarth
- 1967: Ralph Rose
- 1976 & 1977: Bryan Quirk
- 1993 - Brent Dyer
- 1994: Merv Neagle
- 1998 & 1999: Neville Massina
- 2000: Jamie Bond
- 2014: Jamie Bond / Glenn Chadwick
- 2022: Coby Perry

== Notable players ==
The following footballers played with Maryborough FNC, prior to playing senior football in the VFL/AFL, and / or drafted, with the year indicating their VFL/AFL debut.

- 1884 – Jack Worrall - Fitzroy, Carlton, Essendon player/coach
- 1887 - Con Hickey - Fitzroy
- 1895 - Pat Hickey - Fitzroy
- 1897 – Tom Banks - Fitzroy player/administrator
- 1897 - Alf Wood - (Melbourne)
- 1899 - Alf Catlin - Collingwood
- 1909 - Bert Richardson - St Kilda
- 1918 - Jimmy Sullivan - Essendon
- 1920 - Horrie Clover - Carlton
- 1921 - Larry Polinelli - St Kilda
- 1922 - Jim Cullum - South Melbourne
- 1922 - Bill Gunn - South Melbourne
- 1923 - Hedley Blackmore - Carlton
- 1925 - Ted Brewis - Carlton
- 1927 - George Arnott - Hawthorn
- 1927 - Les Johnson - Carlton
- 1929 - Cecil Kerr - Fitzroy
- 1929 - Paul Killeen - Fitzroy
- 1929 - Colin Niven - Fitzroy
- 1931 - Johnny Leonard - South Melbourne
- 1931 - Ray Niven - Fitzroy
- 1932 - Reg Drew - St Kilda
- 1932 - Leo Nolan - Melbourne
- 1935 – Gordon Jones - Melbourne
- 1935 - Jack Ryan - Footscray
- 1936 - Wally Lock - Melbourne
- 1939 - Jack E. Williams - South Melbourne
- 1940 - Jim Mooring - Carlton
- 1941 - Jack Matthews - North Melbourne
- 1942 - Max Oppy - Richmond
- 1945 - Joe Keating - St Kilda
- 1945 - Jim Oppy - Melbourne
- 1946 - Allan Matheson - Essendon
- 1948 - Dick Bryar - Essendon
- 1951 - Ron McMahon - Melbourne
- 1951 - Ron Richards - Footscray
- 1952 - Brian Coleman - Essendon
- 1953 – Ron Branton - Richmond
- 1953 - Kevin Coppock - Richmond
- 1953 - Ian McCann - Hawthorn
- 1956 – Don Nicholls - Carlton
- 1957 - Rod McKindlay - North Melbourne
- 1957 – John Nicholls - Carlton / AFL Hall of Fame
- 1959 - Ron Nalder - Hawthorn
- 1960 - Kevin Connell - Hawthorn
- 1961 - Bernie Dowling - Footscray
- 1961 - Tony Polinelli - Geelong
- 1964 - Mike Hammond - Richmond
- 1968 - Noel Bishop - Carlton
- 1969 - Geoff Thatcher - Footscray
- 1974 - Graeme Whitnall - Carlton
- 1975 - Gary Higgins - Carlton
- 1975 – Russell Ohlsen - Collingwood & Carlton
- 1986 - Geoff MacIlwain - Richmond
- 1989 - Daryl Groves - Collingwood (No. 10 AFL Draft)
- 1989 - Brendan Tranter - Collingwood
- 1991 - Jamie Elliott - Fitzroy, Richmond & St Kilda
- 1994 - Glenn Gorman - Sydney Swans
- 2004 – Jed Adcock - Brisbane
- 2010 – Stewart Crameri - Essendon
- 2010 - Eddie Prato - Footscray (No. 59 Rookie Draft)
- 2022 - Kai Lohmann - Brisbane Lions

The following footballers played senior VFL / AFL football prior to playing and / or coaching with Maryborough FNC with the year indicating their first season at MFNC.

- 1878 - Bill Lacey - Carlton
- 1924 - Artie Wood - South Melbourne
- 1927 – Colin Watson - St Kilda
- 1933 - Bob Makeham - Collingwood
- 1935 - Les Dayman - Footscray
- 1936 - Ted Llewellyn - Geelong
- 1937 - Fred Coppock - Footscray
- 1946 - Ernie Coward - Essendon
- 1950 - Bill Wells - North Melbourne
- 1951 - Don Wilks - Hawthorn
- 1953 - Vic Chanter - Fitzroy
- 1954 - Fred Clarke - Richmond
- 1967 - Ralph Rose - Collingwood
- 1976 - Bryan Quirk - Carlton
- 1988 - Gordon Sumner - Collingwood
- 1989 - Jamie Bond - Fitzroy
- 1994 - Merv Neagle - Essendon
- 2015 - Brock McLean - Melbourne

== Netball Premierships ==
Bendigo Football Netball League

- B Grade
  - 1996

== Netball Runners Up ==
Bendigo Football Netball League

- A Grade
  - 2002
- B Grade
  - 1999, 2000, 2004
- C Grade
  - 1997, 1998, 2000
- Under 17
  - 2010, 2017
