= Coppock =

Coppock may refer to:

- Coppock, Iowa, a city in the United States
- Coppock (surname)
- Coppock curve, a stock market bottom indicator
