= Dee Edwards =

Dee Edwards may refer to:

- Dee Edwards (businesswoman), British entrepreneur
- Dee Edwards (singer) (1945–2006), American singer
- Norma Dee Edwards (1912–1994), American politician
