= Les Reeves =

Australian rules footballer

Personal information
- Full name: Leslie Charles Reeves
- Born: 22 June 1923; Coburg, Victoria
- Died: 23 June 1967 (aged 44); Preston, Victoria
- Original team: Wesley College, Melbourne
- Height: 179 cm (5 ft 10 in)
- Weight: 83 kg (183 lb)

Playing career^{1}
Years	Club	Games (Goals)
1946–1953	North Melbourne	116 (8)
- ^{1} Playing statistics correct to the end of 1953.

Leslie Charles Reeves (22 June 1923 – 23 June 1967) was an Australian rules footballer in the Victorian Football League, (VFL).

Reeves was the nephew of Ray Niven and Colin Niven.

Prior to playing VFL football, Reeves served in the Australian Army during World War II.
