= Coppuck =

Coppuck is a surname. Notable people with the surname include:

- Frank Coppuck, British motorsport engineer
- Gordon Coppuck (born 1936), British motorsport engineer

== See also ==
- Coppock (surname)
