= Triptow =

Triptow is a surname. Notable people with the surname include:

- Dick Triptow (1922–2015), American basketball player and coach
- Kunigunde Triptow (1919–1994), German physician and politician
- Robert Triptow (born 1952), American writer and artist
