= Fred Clarke (Australian footballer) =

Australian rules footballer (1932–2020)

Personal information
- Full name: Fredrick Clarke
- Born: 1 December 1932
- Died: 17 August 2020 (aged 87)
- Original team: Heidelberg
- Height: 183 cm (6 ft 0 in)
- Weight: 92 kg (203 lb)

Playing career^{1}
Years	Club	Games (Goals)
1951–1953	Richmond	21 (0)
- ^{1} Playing statistics correct to the end of 1953.

Fred Clarke (1 December 1932 – 17 August 2020) was an Australian rules footballer who played with Richmond in the Victorian Football League (VFL).

During his career he wore the number 17 guernsey made famous by Jack Dyer, the first player to do so after the retirement of Dyer.

== Career ==
Clarke came to Richmond as an 18-year-old in the 1951 VFL season, from Heidelberg. He was 19th man in the opening round, then was moved from his natural half-back flank position to full-back for the second round against South Melbourne, after an injury to Bob Wiggins. Described as a fast moving and robust player, Clarke appeared again in round three, then spent a brief period of time in the seconds. In July he learnt he would have to leave Richmond for military training, compulsory for 18-year-olds during the Korean War, which ended his season.

He put together 14 appearances for Richmond in the 1952 season, 12 of them in succession, playing in a variety of positions including full-back.

In the 1953 season, Clarke played four early games before suffering a thigh injury from which he was unable to recover well enough to make any more appearances. He was unlucky with injuries again in 1954, unable to get a game he was granted a clearance to Maryborough in late June.

A member of five Heidelberg premiership teams, he is a back pocket in the club's Team of the Century.

== Personal life ==
Fred had four brothers, Robert (Bob), Ronald, Colin Thomas and Ralph Gordon Clarke.

He eventually met Fay, his wife. Fred and Fay had four children, three sons and a daughter.

His eldest son, Neil Clarke, played 135 games for Essendon and featured in two premiership sides.
