= Paul Killeen =

Paul Killeen may refer to:

- Paul Killeen (footballer)
- Paul Killeen (hurler)
