= Gordon Jones (Australian footballer) =

Australian rules footballer

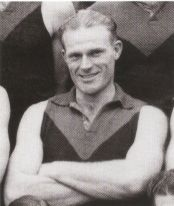

Personal information
- Full name: Gordon Lindsay Jones
- Born: 2 November 1913; Bealiba, Victoria
- Died: 3 December 1999 (aged 86)
- Original team: Maryborough
- Height: 180 cm (5 ft 11 in)
- Weight: 85 kg (187 lb)
- Position: Follower

Playing career^{1}
| Years | Club | Games (Goals) |
| 1935–1940 | Melbourne | 61 (2) |
- ^{1} Playing statistics correct to the end of 1940.

Gordon Lindsay Jones (2 November 1913 – 3 December 1999) was an Australian rules footballer who played for Melbourne in the Victorian Football League (VFL).

He was the cousin of Melbourne footballers Colin Niven and Ray Niven.

A Maryborough recruit, he had a strong year in 1938 when he gathered 12 Brownlow Medal votes to finish as the best-placed Melbourne player and equal ninth overall.

Jones debuted in league football with a solid performance as a ruckman in the opening round of the 1935 VFL season when Melbourne lost to Essendon 15.9 (99) to 24.15 (159).

He was primarily a follower during his career but also played at centre half back, the position in which he was a member of Melbourne's 1939 and 1940 premiership teams.

Jones won the Donald Gift in 1935.
