= Ian McCann =

Ian McCann may refer to:

- Ian McCann (Australian rules footballer) (1933–2018)
- Ian McCann (rugby league) Australian rugby league player
