= Bert Richardson (footballer) =

Australian rules footballer

Personal information
- Full name: Bertram Leslie Richardson
- Born: 3 January 1887; Maryborough, Victoria
- Died: 15 August 1962 (aged 75); Ballarat, Victoria
- Original team: Maryborough

Playing career^{1}
Years	Club	Games (Goals)
1909	St Kilda	1 (0)
- ^{1} Playing statistics correct to the end of 1909.

Bertram Leslie Richardson (3 January 1887 – 15 August 1962) was an Australian rules footballer who played for the St Kilda Football Club in the Victorian Football League (VFL).
