= Ron McMahon =

Australian rules footballer (1927–2016)

Personal information
- Full name: Ron McMahon
- Born: 29 March 1927
- Died: 10 May 2016 (aged 89)
- Original team: Maryborough
- Height: 185 cm (6 ft 1 in)
- Weight: 80 kg (176 lb)

Playing career^{1}
Years	Club	Games (Goals)
1951–52	Melbourne	13 (1)
- ^{1} Playing statistics correct to the end of 1952.

Ron McMahon (29 March 1927 – 10 May 2016) was an Australian rules footballer who played with Melbourne in the Victorian Football League (VFL).
