= Jim Cullum =

Australian rules footballer

Personal information
- Full name: James Albert Cullum
- Born: 9 April 1898; Broadford, Victoria
- Died: 21 November 1948 (aged 50); East Melbourne, Victoria
- Original team: Maryborough

Playing career^{1}
Years	Club	Games (Goals)
1922	South Melbourne	2 (0)
- ^{1} Playing statistics correct to the end of 1922.

James Albert Cullum (9 April 1898 – 21 November 1948) was an Australian rules footballer who played with South Melbourne in the Victorian Football League (VFL).
