= Brian Coleman (footballer, born 1932) =

Australian rules footballer

Personal information
- Full name: Brian Coleman
- Born: 21 May 1932
- Died: 9 December 1966 (aged 34); Melbourne
- Original team: Cobden
- Height: 182 cm (6 ft 0 in)
- Weight: 79 kg (174 lb)

Playing career^{1}
Years	Club	Games (Goals)
1952–1953	Essendon	10 (0)
- ^{1} Playing statistics correct to the end of 1953.

Brian Coleman (21 May 1932 – 9 December 1966) was an Australian rules footballer who played with Essendon in the Victorian Football League (VFL).

Coleman, a half back, started his career at Cobden. From there he joined Essendon and played five games in both the 1952 and 1953 VFL seasons. He left Essendon in 1954 and returned to the Ballarat Football League, signing with Maryborough.

In 1961 he won the Ballarat Football League's best and fairest award.

He died in 1966, aged 34, in an accident at a gymnasium. A police constable, he had attempted a somersault from a spring board and received cervical injuries when he landed badly. He died on the way to the hospital.
