= Jack Ryan (footballer, born 1914) =

Australian rules footballer

Personal information
- Full name: John Francis Thomas Ryan
- Born: 3 December 1914; Sale, Victoria
- Died: 31 July 1976 (aged 61); Maryborough, Victoria
- Original team: Maryborough (BFL)
- Height: 180 cm (5 ft 11 in)
- Weight: 78 kg (172 lb)
- Position: Wingman

Playing career^{1}
| Years | Club | Games (Goals) |
| 1935–1939 | Footscray | 74 (37) |
| 1940–1941 | North Melbourne | 9 (2) |
| Total | | 83 (39) |
- ^{1} Playing statistics correct to the end of 1941.

John Francis Thomas Ryan (3 December 1914 – 31 July 1976) was an Australian rules footballer who played with Footscray and North Melbourne in the Victorian Football League (VFL).

Originally from Bendigo Football League club Maryborough Ryan topped Footscray's goal-kicking in 1935, his debut season, with 25 goals. The following year he was selected to represent the VFL against the Victorian Football Association (VFA). He was a regular fixture in the Footscray side, as a wingman, for another three seasons before being traded to North Melbourne, in exchange for Ted Ellis, in 1940.
