= Jim Oppy =

Australian rules footballer

Personal information
- Full name: James Watson Oppy
- Born: 8 March 1921; Maryborough, Victoria
- Died: 24 July 2011 (aged 90)
- Original teams: Campbell's Creek, Castlemaine, Maryborough

Playing career^{1}
Years	Club	Games (Goals)
1945	Melbourne	3 (0)
- ^{1} Playing statistics correct to the end of 1945.

James Watson Oppy (8 March 1921 – 24 July 2011) was an Australian rules footballer who played with Melbourne in the Victorian Football League (VFL).

== Family ==
The son of James Thomas Oppy (1893–1935) and Doris Edna Oppy, née Watson (1895–1967), James Watson Oppy, known as "Jim", was born on 8 March 1921.

He was the older brother of Richmond player Max Oppy and cousin of Dick Reynolds, Tom Reynolds, and murdered lawyer Keith William Allan.
