= Don Nicholls =

Australian rules footballer (1936–2023)

Personal information
- Full name: Donald Charles Nicholls
- Born: 23 November 1936
- Died: 10 September 2023 (aged 86)
- Original teams: Primrose, Maryborough
- Height: 178 cm (5 ft 10 in)
- Weight: 80 kg (176 lb)

Playing career^{1}
Years	Club	Games (Goals)
1956–61	Carlton	77 (32)
- ^{1} Playing statistics correct to the end of 1961.

Donald Charles Nicholls (23 November 1936 – 10 September 2023) was an Australian rules footballer who played with Carlton in the Victorian Football League (VFL).

Nicholls won the 1952 Maryborough District Football League best and fairest award with Primrose Football Club, before playing with Maryborough Football Club in the Ballarat Football League and winning the Ballarat FL best and fairest award in 1953.

The Carlton Football Club recruited Nicholls from the Maryborough Football Club in 1956. The Blues would later sign his younger brother John. Their father ensured that both brothers would play together with one club. Don played 77 senior games as a centreman for Carlton from 1956, when he was Carlton's best first-year player, to 1961.

In 1962 he left Carlton to play for Box Hill.

Don Nicholls died in September 2023, at the age of 86.
