= Geoff MacIlwain =

Australian rules footballer

Personal information
- Full name: Geoff MacIlwain
- Born: 28 October 1963 (age 63)
- Original team: Doncaster
- Height: 193 cm (6 ft 4 in)
- Weight: 90 kg (198 lb)

Playing career^{1}
Years	Club	Games (Goals)
1986	Richmond	2 (0)
- ^{1} Playing statistics correct to the end of 1986.

Geoff MacIlwain (born 28 October 1963) is a former Australian rules footballer who played with Richmond in the Victorian Football League (VFL).

MacIlwain was already 22 when he first played for Richmond. He made two senior appearances in total for the club, both early in the 1986 VFL season. The former Doncaster player would go on to win back to back Henderson Medals with Maryborough, in 1990 and 1991.
