= Dick Bryar =

Australian rules footballer

Personal information
- Full name: Richard Baden Bryar
- Born: 16 February 1925
- Died: 11 April 1968 (aged 43)
- Original team: Maryborough
- Height: 179 cm (5 ft 10 in)
- Weight: 86 kg (190 lb)
- Positions: Forward, centreman

Playing career^{1}
Years	Club	Games (Goals)
1948	Essendon	3 (0)
- ^{1} Playing statistics correct to the end of 1948.

Richard Baden Bryar (16 February 1925 – 11 April 1968) was an Australian rules footballer who played with Essendon in the Victorian Football League (VFL). Bryar served in the Royal Australian Air Force during World War II. After his season with Essendon, he played with Coburg in the Victorian Football Association (VFA) and Drysdale.
