= Reg Drew =

Australian rules footballer, born 1910

Personal information
- Full name: Reginald Alan Drew
- Born: 21 August 1910; Newport, Victoria
- Died: 12 November 1992 (aged 82)
- Original team: Maryborough
- Height: 173 cm (5 ft 8 in)
- Weight: 66 kg (146 lb)

Playing career^{1}
Years	Club	Games (Goals)
1932	St Kilda	3 (0)
- ^{1} Playing statistics correct to the end of 1932.

Reginald Alan Drew (21 August 1910 – 12 November 1992) was an Australian rules footballer who played with St Kilda in the Victorian Football League (VFL).
