= Les Johnson (footballer, born 1903) =

Australian rules footballer, born 1903

Personal information
- Full name: Leslie Alexander Johnson
- Born: 15 July 1903; Maryborough, Victoria
- Died: 14 June 1979 (aged 75); Kew, Victoria
- Original team: Maryborough
- Height: 184 cm (6 ft 0 in)
- Weight: 81 kg (179 lb)

Playing career^{1}
Years	Club	Games (Goals)
1927–28	Carlton	29 (13)
- ^{1} Playing statistics correct to the end of 1928.

Leslie Alexander Johnson (15 July 1903 – 14 June 1979) was an Australian rules footballer who played with Carlton in the Victorian Football League (VFL).

Johnson was coach of Maryborough in the Ballarat Football League in 1925 and 1926.
