= Max Oppy =

Australian rules footballer and coach

Personal information
- Full name: William Maxwell Oppy
- Born: 14 October 1924; Maryborough, Victoria
- Died: 25 November 2008 (aged 84)
- Original team: Maryborough/Kew
- Weight: 80.5 kg (177 lb)
- Positions: Defender, Rover

Playing career^{1}
Years	Club	Games (Goals)
1942–1954	Richmond	185 (29)

Coaching career
Years	Club	Games (W–L–D)
1956	Richmond	18 (6–12–0)
- ^{1} Playing statistics correct to the end of 1954.

Career highlights
- Richmond Premiership Player 1943; Interstate Games:- 4; Richmond – Hall of Fame – inducted 2004

William Maxwell Oppy (14 October 1924 – 25 November 2008) was an Australian rules football player who played in the Victorian Football League (VFL) between 1942 and 1954 for the Richmond Football Club. He was senior coach of Richmond in 1956.

== Career ==
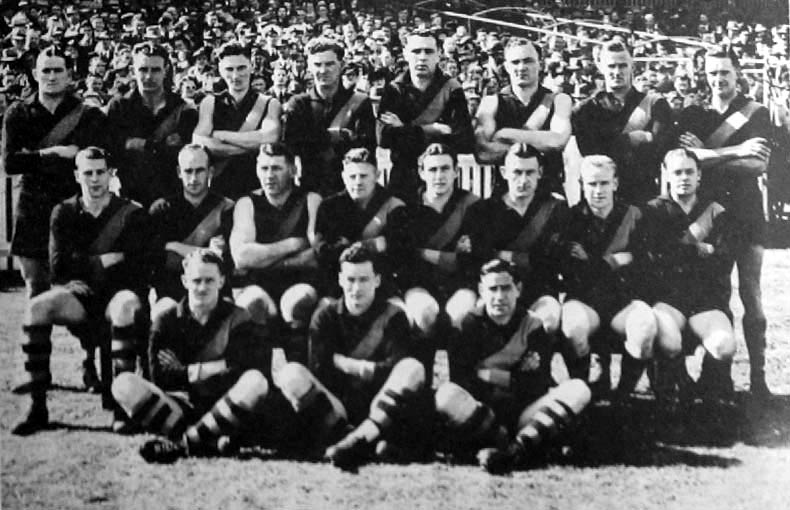
1943 VFL Premiers: Richmond FC

Oppy, who was recruited from Kew, via Maryborough originally, and won Kew's best first year player in 1941.

Oppy also played with Carnegie Sons of Soldiers FC side in the C. Grade Under 18 competition of the Cauldfield, Oakleigh, Dandenong Football League in 1940.

Oppy started his VFL career as a rover at Richmond in 1942 and played in their 1943 VFL premiership side.

The following season he was pushed into defence by Jack Dyer and soon established a place in the side as a specialist back pocket, participating in Richmond's losing 1944 VFL Grand Final.

He represented the VFL at interstate matches four times. Jack Dyer called him the "player who could not be hurt.

After retiring from football in 1954, Oppy returned to Richmond two years later and replaced Alby Pannam as senior coach in 1956. They managed just six wins, finishing in tenth position, which meant Oppy wasn't kept on in 1957.

== Family ==
The son of James Thomas Oppy (1893–1935) and Doris Edna Oppy, née Watson (1895–1967), William Maxwell Oppy, known as "Max", was born on 14 October 1924. He was the brother of Jim Oppy and cousin of Dick Reynolds, Tom Reynolds, and murdered lawyer Keith William Allan.
