= George Arnott =

Australian rules footballer (born 1901)

Personal information
- Full name: Gervais Colquhoun Arnott
- Born: 30 June 1901; Flemington, Victoria
- Died: 5 September 1985 (aged 84); Williamstown, Victoria
- Original team: Maryborough
- Height: 177 cm (5 ft 10 in)

Playing career^{1}
| Years | Club | Games (Goals) |
| 1927 | Hawthorn | 10 (0) |
- ^{1} Playing statistics correct to the end of 1927.

Gervais Colquhoun 'George' Arnott (30 June 1901 – 5 September 1985) was an Australian rules footballer who played with Hawthorn in the Victorian Football League (VFL).

== Early life ==
The fifth of six children born to Arthur Edward Arnott (1862–1945) and Grace Colquhoun (1866–1943), Gervais Colquhoun Arnott was born on 30 June 1901 at Flemington in inner northern Melbourne.

== Football ==
Arnott commenced in football career in Maryborough, initially playing for the Railways team and then being part of Maryborough’s premiership sides in the Ballarat Football League in 1924 and 1925.

Arnott joined Hawthorn from Maryborough at the beginning of the 1927 season. He played ten VFL games at Hawthorn, acquitting himself well on his debut against St. Kilda. Arnott played at full back for the first five games of the season before being injured against Carlton and missing the next two games. He returned for Rounds 8-10 but was then dropped to the reserves before playing two further games near the end of the season on the half-forward line.

After only one season with Hawthorn, Arnott moved to Dimboola in the Wimmera where he played for local team in the Wimmera League under Leo Wescott.

Arnott subsequently returned to playing in the Ballarat League before returning to senior football in 1931 when he transferred to VFA side Williamstown. Despite being named as an emergency the week after receiving a permit he never made a senior appearance for Williamstown.

== War Service ==
Arnott later served in the Australian Army for two and a half years during World War II, spending some time in Egypt as part of the 9th Division Engineers.

== Later life ==
In 1931, Gervais Arnott married Bridget Theresa O’Brien (1901–1982) and they lived in the Williamstown area for their whole married life. Gervais Colquhoun Arnott died at Williamstown on 5 September 1985 and is buried with his wife at Altona Memorial Park.
