= Allan Matheson =

Australian rules footballer

Personal information
- Full name: Allan Douglas Matheson
- Born: 3 May 1925; Birchip, Victoria
- Died: 4 August 2008 (aged 83)
- Original teams: Maryborough, Essendon District
- Height: 161 cm (5 ft 3 in)
- Weight: 70 kg (154 lb)
- Position: Rover

Playing career^{1}
| Years | Club | Games (Goals) |
| 1946 | Essendon | 3 (2) |
- ^{1} Playing statistics correct to the end of 1946.

Allan Douglas Matheson (3 May 1925 – 4 August 2008) was an Australian rules footballer who played for the Essendon Football Club in the Victorian Football League (VFL). He later played for Narraport and was captain-coach of Nullawil. Matheson worked as a caretaker and chaplain until his retirement in 1986.
