= Bernie Dowling =

Australian rules footballer

Personal information
- Full name: Bernie Dowling
- Born: 6 June 1942 (age 84)
- Original team: Maryborough
- Height: 175 cm (5 ft 9 in)
- Weight: 72 kg (159 lb)
- Position: Rover

Playing career^{1}
| Years | Club | Games (Goals) |
| 1961–1963 | Footscray | 18 (8) |
- ^{1} Playing statistics correct to the end of 1963.

Bernie Dowling (born 6 June 1942) is a former Australian rules footballer who played for the Footscray Football Club in the Victorian Football League (VFL).
