= Ralph Rose (footballer) =

Australian rules footballer

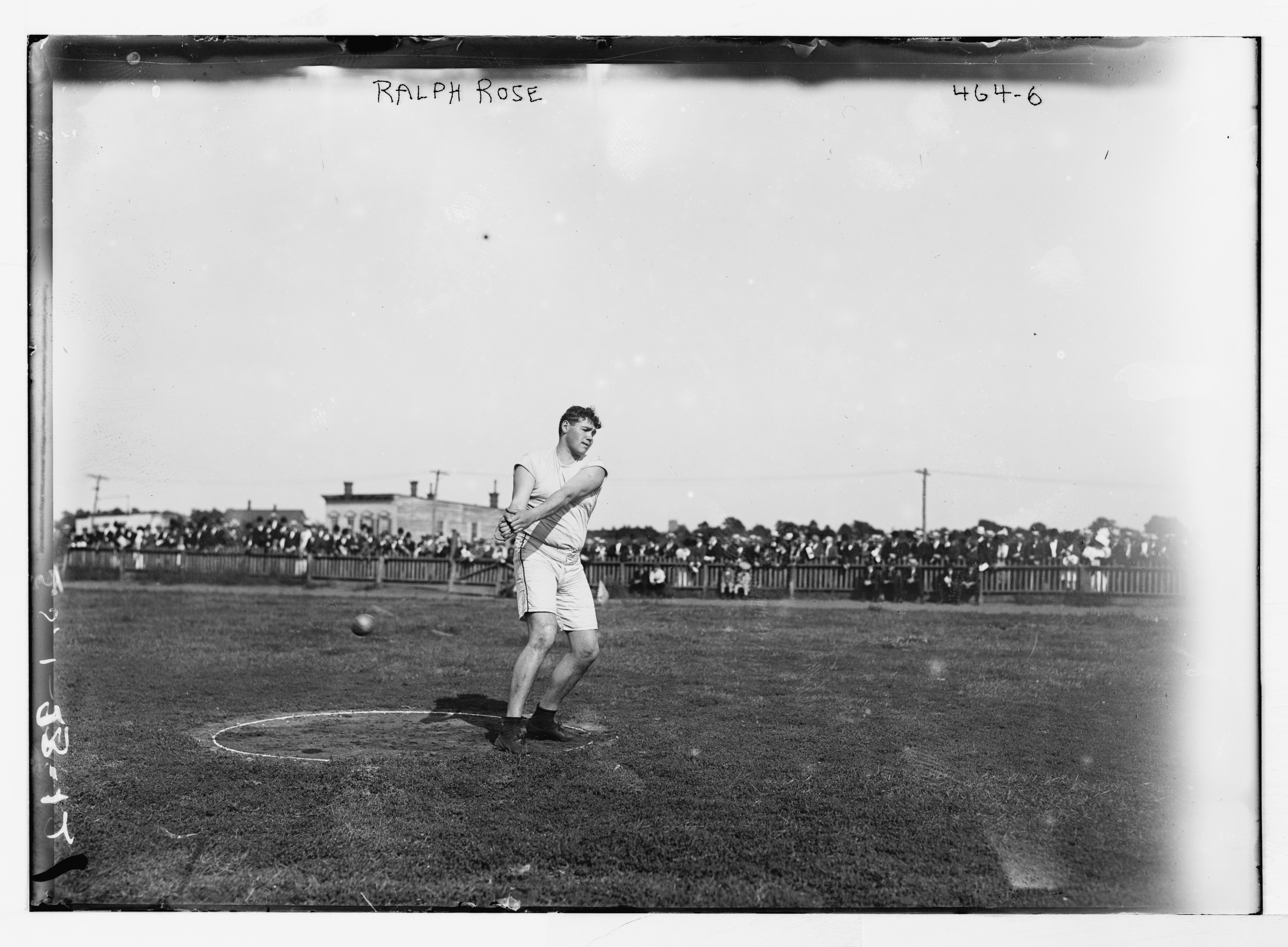

Personal information
- Full name: Ralph Desmond Rose
- Born: 2 February 1943; Nyah West, Victoria
- Died: 14 October 1992 (aged 49)
- Original team: Nyah West
- Height: 180 cm (5 ft 11 in)
- Weight: 74 kg (163 lb)

Playing career^{1}
Years	Club	Games (Goals)
1962–1963	Collingwood	23 (9)
- ^{1} Playing statistics correct to the end of 1963.

Ralph Desmond Rose (2 February 1943 - 14 October 1992) was an Australian rules footballer who played with Collingwood in the Victorian Football League (VFL).

Rose, a Nyah West recruit, appeared in the opening 16 rounds of the 1962 VFL season. The centre half-forward played a further nine games in 1963.

He is the youngest of the four Rose brothers who played for Collingwood, Bill, Bob and Kevin.

In 1964 he accepted an offer to captain-coach Wycheproof-Narraport and in 1967 he joined Maryborough as playing coach. He continued to coach clubs into the 1970s, including Avenel.
