= Noel Bishop =

Australian rules footballer

Personal information
- Full name: Noel Bishop
- Born: 12 February 1948 (age 78)
- Original team: Maryborough
- Height: 178 cm (5 ft 10 in)
- Weight: 78.5 kg (173 lb)

Playing career^{1}
Years	Club	Games (Goals)
1968	Carlton	2 (0)
- ^{1} Playing statistics correct to the end of 1968.

Noel Bishop (born 12 February 1948) is a former Australian rules footballer who played with Carlton in the Victorian Football League (VFL).
