= Geoff Thatcher =

Australian rules footballer

Personal information
- Full name: Geoff Thatcher
- Born: 22 September 1950 (age 76)
- Original team: Maryborough
- Height: 184 cm (6 ft 0 in)
- Weight: 81 kg (179 lb)

Playing career^{1}
Years	Club	Games (Goals)
1969	Footscray	36 (11)
- ^{1} Playing statistics correct to the end of 1969.

Geoff Thatcher (born 22 September 1950) is a former Australian rules footballer who played with Footscray in the Victorian Football League (VFL).
