= Rod McKindlay =

Australian rules footballer

Personal information
- Full name: Roderick Donald McKindlay
- Born: 25 October 1935
- Died: 18 March 2015 (aged 79)
- Original team: Maryborough
- Height: 188 cm (6 ft 2 in)
- Weight: 76 kg (168 lb)

Playing career^{1}
Years	Club	Games (Goals)
1957–59	North Melbourne	5 (0)
- ^{1} Playing statistics correct to the end of 1959.

Roderick Donald McKindlay (25 October 1935 – 18 March 2015) was an Australian rules footballer who played with North Melbourne in the Victorian Football League (VFL).

He died in 2015.
