= Kevin Connell =

Australian rules footballer

Personal information
- Full name: Kevin Connell
- Born: 27 August 1939
- Original team: Maryborough
- Height: 173 cm (5 ft 8 in)
- Weight: 73 kg (161 lb)

Playing career^{1}
Years	Club	Games (Goals)
1960–1964	Hawthorn	55 (64)
- ^{1} Playing statistics correct to the end of 1964.

Kevin Connell (born 27 August 1939) is a former Australian rules footballer who played with Hawthorn in the Victorian Football League (VFL).

Connell, a rover from Maryborough, was a regular member of the Hawthorn team for much of the early 1960s. He was unlucky to miss out on participating in Hawthorn's breakthrough premiership win in 1961, having been in good form with five goals against Richmond in the final round of the home and away season, only to injure his knee in the semi.

Two years later he was the beneficiary of an injury, when he was named in the Hawthorn side which contested the 1963 preliminary final, despite previously playing just one game all year. He had been called up as cover for Ian Law and kept his spot on the bench for the 1963 VFL Grand Final, which Hawthorn lost.
