= Larry Polinelli =

Australian rules footballer

Personal information
- Full name: Laurence Polinelli
- Born: 19 December 1891; Dunolly, Victoria
- Died: 12 September 1955 (aged 63); Castlemaine, Victoria
- Original team: Maryborough
- Height: 182 cm (6 ft 0 in)
- Weight: 83 kg (183 lb)

Playing career^{1}
| Years | Club | Games (Goals) |
| 1921 | St Kilda | 1 (1) |
- ^{1} Playing statistics correct to the end of 1921.

Laurence Polinelli (19 December 1891 – 12 September 1955) was an Australian rules footballer who played with St Kilda in the Victorian Football League (VFL).
