= Coppock (surname) =

Coppock is the surname of the following people:

- Barclay Coppock (1839–1861), American soldier
- Chet Coppock, American radio broadcaster, television broadcaster, sports talk personality and author
- Dick Coppock (1885–1971), British trade unionist and politician
- Edwin Coppock (1835–1859), American soldier, brother of Barclay
- Fred Coppock (1905–1965), Australian rules footballer
- Kevin Coppock (1932–2016), Australian rules footballer
- Laurel Coppock (born 1977), American comedic actress
- John Terence Coppock (1921–2000), British geographer
