= Joe Keating =

Australian rules footballer

Personal information
- Full name: Joe Keating
- Born: 24 January 1922
- Died: 10 June 2000 (aged 78)
- Original team: Maryborough
- Height: 185 cm (6 ft 1 in)
- Weight: 76 kg (168 lb)

Playing career^{1}
Years	Club	Games (Goals)
1945	St Kilda	4 (0)
- ^{1} Playing statistics correct to the end of 1945.

Joe Keating (24 January 1922 – 10 June 2000) was an Australian rules footballer who played with St Kilda in the Victorian Football League (VFL).
