= Artie Wood =

Australian rules footballer and coach

Personal information
- Full name: Arthur Charles Wood
- Born: 24 June 1898; Williamstown, Victoria
- Died: 14 May 1959 (aged 60); Horsham, Victoria
- Original team: Middle Park/City of Northcote
- Height: 163 cm (5 ft 4 in)
- Weight: 62 kg (137 lb)
- Position: Wingman

Playing career^{1}
| Years | Club | Games (Goals) |
| 1917–1923 | South Melbourne | 97 (14) |

Coaching career
| Years | Club | Games (W–L–D) |
| 1921 | South Melbourne | 16 (5–10–1) |
- ^{1} Playing statistics correct to the end of 1923.

Arthur Charles Wood (24 June 1898 – 14 May 1959) was an Australian rules footballer who played for and coached South Melbourne in the Victorian Football League (VFL).

Arthur Wood, known as 'Artie', was a wingman and made his debut during the 1917 season. He was a member of the South Melbourne VFL premiership team of 1918.

He spent the 1921 season as playing coach, despite being aged only 25, and the club finished in seventh position.

Wood was captain-coach of Maryborough in 1924 and 1925 when they won back to back Ballarat Football League premierships. Wood led Maryborough in 1926 too, then was captain-coach of Horsham from 1927 to 1934, winning a premiership in 1932.
