= Ron Richards (footballer, born 1927) =

Australian rules footballer

Personal information
- Full name: Ronald Allan Richards
- Born: 2 December 1927
- Died: 11 October 2006 (aged 78)
- Original team: Maryborough
- Height: 187 cm (6 ft 2 in)
- Weight: 80 kg (176 lb)

Playing career^{1}
Years	Club	Games (Goals)
1951–52	Footscray	12 (8)
- ^{1} Playing statistics correct to the end of 1952.

Ronald Allan Richards (2 December 1927 – 11 October 2006) was an Australian rules footballer who played with Footscray in the Victorian Football League (VFL).

== Notes ==
Ron has three children; Heather, Stuart and Geoffrey eight grandchildren; Renee, Rhiannon, Jarrod, Wynton, Jesse, Elise, Oscar, Poppy and two great-grandchildren; Tessa and Zander.
