= Tilläggspension =

Swedish pension system

Tilläggspension ('Supplementary pension') is a government-run pension system in Sweden, paid to wage labourers on retirement. It was originally enacted on 1 January 1960 by an act of parliament, and funded by payroll taxes paid by the employers. The original system was called Allmän tilläggspension ('General supplementary pension', ATP). The systems are called "supplementary" because they are paid in addition to the general age pension, and the size of the payment is dependent on wages earned and the number of years as a wage earner.

== History ==
Before the advent of ATP, Swedish labourers were only insured with a basic retirement fund, which was barely adequate to sustain them. Professional employees, in contrast, had a higher wage and their union succeeded in negotiating a supplementary retirement fund with employers which was paid by wages. Other groups did not have the same opportunity to negotiate supplementary retirement funds.

In 1956 an investigation was commissioned to investigate this problem. It suggested a system for a general employee retirement fund for the workers. The parties represented in the Riksdag thus disagreed with each other, with centre and right-wing parties wanting a voluntary system, while the Swedish Social Democratic Party together with the Communist Party wanted a mandatory system.

Although at a public referendum 1957 the line which advocated a mandatory system received most votes, the social democrats could not pass the issue because of a tie vote. But they put forward the proposition anyway. The tie vote was resolved by an MP (Ture Königson) for the Folkpartiet who abstained stating that he cannot vote against the pensioners, thereby passing the proposition.

The ATP system came into effect on 1 January 1960, and the first payments from the ATP system were made in 1963.

To qualify for the full ATP amount, wage earners are required to have worked for at least 30 years. The full amount of the individual pension level is based the 15 years of highest wage income of their working life. Under this system, total payments from the government-run system were equivalent to about 60-65% of the salary people had before retiring. The various parts of the system was financed by both employees and employers.

In 1994 the Swedish parliament made a decision to reform the entire pension system as it was not equipped to handle large demographic changes related to an aging population, or large variations in the growth. The economic crisis of the early 1990s provided additional impetus for these reforms. The Vänsterpartiet was the only party objecting the suggested change. In the new system the retirement fund is partially based on total income and partially on paid obligations.

In 2003, the pension scheme's name was changed from allmän tilläggspension to tilläggspension.

== Current situation ==
The current Swedish pension system consists of inkomstpension ("income pension"), premiepension ("premium pension") and garantipension ("guarantee pension"), where the last one works as a safeguard/lowest point of reduction for the general pension. This system was brought in progressively from 1999. The current system is based on income earners' entire life-income.

The amount of pension determined by the old system and the new system depend on the birth year of the individual. People born before 1937 have only ATP, people born between 1938–1953 have both the old ATP and the current system in various proportions, and people born 1954 and later have only the current system.
