= Ernie Coward =

Australian rules footballer (1916–1985)

Personal information
- Full name: Ernest Coward
- Born: 27 January 1916
- Died: 5 April 1985 (aged 69)
- Original team: West Perth
- Height: 170 cm (5 ft 7 in)
- Weight: 67 kg (148 lb)
- Position: Wingman

Playing career^{1}
Years	Club	Games (Goals)
1939–45	Essendon	118 (20)
- ^{1} Playing statistics correct to the end of 1945.

Ernie "Sonny" Coward (27 January 1916 – 5 April 1985) was an Australian rules footballer who played for Essendon in the Victorian Football League (VFL).

Coward was originally from West Perth and along with his teammate Wally Buttsworth had to spend the 1938 season on the sidelines while waiting for a clearance to Essendon.

He soon established himself as a wingman in Dick Reynolds's strong Essendon side of the early 1940s and appeared in three consecutive VFL Grand Finals in 1941, 1942 and 1943, with a premiership in 1942.

The Western Australian was runner-up in the 1944 Essendon Best and Fairest count.

A VFL representative in 1945, Coward played a total of 11 finals matches with Essendon during his career.

Tasmanian club Scottsdale secured his services as captain-coach in 1949, after he had played three seasons at Maryborough.
