= Cecil Kerr =

Australian rules footballer, born 1910

Personal information
- Full name: Norman Cecil Kerr
- Born: 19 April 1910; Maryborough, Victoria
- Died: 22 July 1995 (aged 85); Maryborough, Victoria
- Original team: Maryborough
- Position: Wing

Playing career^{1}
Years	Club	Games (Goals)
1929–32	Fitzroy	64 (3)
- ^{1} Playing statistics correct to the end of 1932.

Norman Cecil Kerr (19 April 1910 – 22 July 1995) was an Australian rules footballer who played with Fitzroy in the Victorian Football League (VFL).
