= Jamie Bond =

Australian rules footballer

Personal information
- Full name: Jamie Bond
- Born: 12 November 1971 (age 54)
- Original team: Talbot / Beaufort
- Draft: No. 78, 1988 national draft
- Height: 190 cm (6 ft 3 in)
- Weight: 89 kg (196 lb)

Playing career^{1}
Years	Club	Games (Goals)
1989	Hawthorn	0 (0)
1990–1991	Fitzroy	1 (1)
- ^{1} Playing statistics correct to the end of 1991.

Jamie Bond (born 12 November 1971) is a former Australian rules footballer who played with Fitzroy in the Australian Football League (AFL).

Bond was an Under-19s player at Hawthorn and joined the senior list when they picked him up in the 1988 VFL draft. He only played reserves football for Hawthorn in 1989, unable to break into the dominant Hawthorn team.

It was with Fitzroy that he made his AFL debut, in round 17 of the 1991 season, against Melbourne at the MCG. He had kicked a goal and a behind from his three disposals.

He didn't appear in another senior game with Fitzroy and made his way to South Launceston, for whom he won a best and fairest in 1994. Bond was then a successful player in the Bendigo Football League, where he played for Maryborough. In 1996 he won the league's best player award, the Michelsen Medal and would have won another in 2001 had he not been ineligible through suspension. Bond, who retired in 2004, was a member of back-to-back Maryborough premiership sides in 1998 and 1999.
