= Paul Killeen (footballer) =

Australian rules footballer, born 1903

Personal information
- Full name: William Paul Killeen
- Born: 8 July 1903; Euroa, Victoria
- Died: 1 March 1991 (aged 87); Kilsyth, Victoria
- Original team: Maryborough
- Height: 177 cm (5 ft 10 in)
- Weight: 79 kg (174 lb)

Playing career^{1}
| Years | Club | Games (Goals) |
| 1929 | Fitzroy | 5 (0) |
- ^{1} Playing statistics correct to the end of 1929.

William Paul Killeen (8 July 1903 – 1 March 1991) was an Australian rules footballer who played with Fitzroy in the Victorian Football League (VFL).
