= Engelbert Holderied =

German ice hockey player

Personal information
- Nationality: German
- Born: 26 June 1924; Füssen, Germany
- Died: 22 October 1994 (aged 70); Füssen, Germany

Sport
- Sport: Ice hockey

Engelbert Holderied (26 June 1924 – 22 October 1994) was a German ice hockey player. He competed in the men's tournament at the 1952 Winter Olympics.
