= Coppock curve =

Indicator in technical analysis

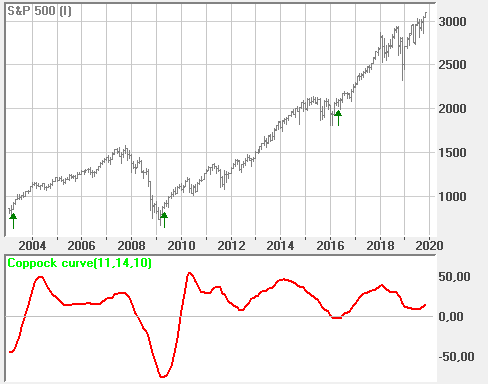
The Coppock Curve alongside the S&P 500 index

The Coppock curve or Coppock indicator is a technical analysis indicator for long-term stock market investors created by E.S.C. Coppock, first published in Barron's Magazine on October 15, 1962.

The indicator is designed for use on a monthly time scale. It is the sum of a 14-month rate of change and 11-month rate of change, smoothed by a 10-period weighted moving average.

$$Coppock = WMA[10] \; of \; (ROC[14] + ROC[11])$$.

Coppock, the founder of Trendex Research in San Antonio, Texas, was an economist. He had been asked by the Episcopal Church to identify buying opportunities for long-term investors. He thought market downturns were like bereavements and required a period of mourning. He asked the church bishops how long that normally took for people, their answer was 11 to 14 months and so he used those periods in his calculation.

A buy signal is generated when the indicator is below zero and turns upwards from a trough. No sell signals are generated (that not being its design). The indicator is trend-following, and based on averages, so by its nature it doesn't pick a market bottom, but rather shows when a rally has become established.

Coppock designed the indicator (originally called the "Trendex Model") for the S&P 500 index, and it has been applied to similar stock indexes like the Dow Jones Industrial Average. It is not regarded as well-suited to commodity markets, since bottoms there are more rounded than the spike lows found in stocks.

== Variations ==
Although designed for monthly use, a daily calculation over the same period can be made, converting the periods to 294-day and 231-day rate of changes, and a 210-day weighted moving average.

A slightly different version of the indicator is still used by the Investors Chronicle, a British investment magazine. The main difference is that the Investors Chronicle version does include the sell signals, although it stresses that they are to be treated with caution. This is because such signals could merely be a dip in a continuing bull market.

Jerry Samet has successfully used the Coppock indicator using weekly close data vs. monthly close. This indicator greatly helps with the definition of the intermediate term market moves of 6-weeks to 12-month duration. Mike Scott has determined that the weekly Coppock used in conjunction with Investor's Business Daily Market Direction calls that a Coppock buy signal that occurs within plus or minus 2 weeks of an IBD Follow-Through Day correctly identifies successfully rallies 79% of the time in bull markets and 45% of the time in bear markets. Success here is defined by a NASDAQ market that rallies at least 9 or 10% over at least a 5 or 6 week period.
