= Ray Niven =

Australian rules footballer

Personal information
- Full name: Raymond Gordon Niven
- Born: 25 April 1911; Bealiba, Victoria
- Died: 26 November 1992 (aged 81)
- Original team: Maryborough

Playing career^{1}
Years	Club	Games (Goals)
1931, 1933–34	Fitzroy	23 (24)
1932	West Perth (WAFL)	18 (23)
1934	Melbourne	2 (2)
1936–38	Brighton (VFA)	34 (62)
- ^{1} Playing statistics correct to the end of 1938.

Raymond Gordon "Bunty" Niven (25 April 1911 – 26 November 1992) was an Australian rules footballer who played with Fitzroy and Melbourne in the Victorian Football League (VFL).

== Family ==
His brother, Colin Niven played for Fitzroy and Melbourne, and his nephew, Les Reeves, played for North Melbourne.

== Football ==
He left Fitzroy to play with West Perth in 1932, before returning to Victoria in 1933.
