= Ture Königson =

Swedish politician (1910–1994)

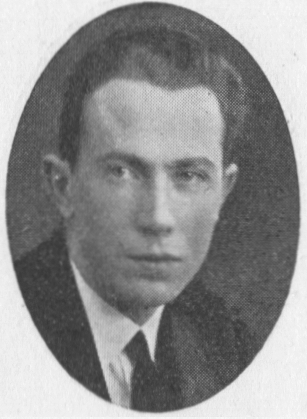
Ture Königson

Ture König Königson (21 June 1910 – 13 October 1994) was a Swedish evangelical labour-liberal politician, belonging to the People's Party. He was born in Gothenburg. Königson is primarily remembered in Swedish politics for having decided the outcome of the parliamentary vote on the 1957 pension reform.

Königson's father was a typographer by profession, Königson became an industrial worker at the Götaverken shipyard in Gothenburg. Königson was a member of the Gothenburg city council 1951 to 1952, and held different municipal positions. In 1953 he became a member of the Second Chamber of the Swedish Parliament, having been elected as a candidate of the People's Party.

Regarding the pension reform, the vote in the parliament had been preceded by a general referendum, in which the proposed reform had won the most votes (out of three alternatives) but no majority. At the time of the parliamentary vote in 1959, the government side counted with 115 seats and the opposition to the reform (including Königson's People's Party) had 115 seats. By abstaining from voting (the sole parliamentarian to do so), Königson decided the vote in the favour of the reform proposal.

This type of action, to disobey party directives in a crucial parliamentary vote, is highly unusual in Swedish politics. Through his abstention, Königson became the most prominent parliamentary dissident in modern Swedish politics. After the vote, Königson declared that being a worker himself he could not vote against the pension reform. He stated that he could not have looked his colleagues at the shipyard in the eyes, had he voted no. Although he received support from the public for his decision, his political career was effectively ended. He was not put forth for re-election by the People's Party in the 1960 polls.
