= Jack Mathews (footballer) =

Australian rules footballer, born 1914

Personal information
- Full name: John Llewellyn Mathews
- Born: 22 October 1914; Dunolly, Victoria
- Died: 25 October 1994 (aged 80); Tasmania
- Original teams: Bealiba, Maryborough

Playing career^{1}
| Years | Club | Games (Goals) |
| 1941 | North Melbourne | 3 (1) |
- ^{1} Playing statistics correct to the end of 1941.

John Llewellyn Mathews (22 October 1914 – 25 October 1994) was an Australian rules footballer who played with North Melbourne in the Victorian Football League (VFL).

Mathews started his football with Bealiba and from there he went to Maryborough in the Bendigo League. In 1941 he played three games with North Melbourne, and the following year joined the R.A.A.F. and briefly served in World War II. After playing with Mirboo North in Gippsland he moved to Tasmania where he both played with and coached Ulverstone until his retirement in 1951.
