= P. M. Aboobacker =

Indian politician

P. M. Abubacker (Poovanitheruvath Maliyekal Abubacker) was one of the Muslim political leaders of Kerala, India, previously a renowned journalist with the Chandrika newspaper in Kozhikode. He represented constituencies Calicut 2 (1982), Koduvally (1987), Guruvayoor (1991) in Legislative assembly of Kerala State. It was his efforts for KUWJ which brought about pensions for journalists. His political career in social service extended almost four decades.

He was a part of Thekkepuram community in Kozhikode. His wife was Smt M P Sainabi and they had four sons PM Iqbal, PM Firoz, PM Afsal, PM Mouzzammil and a daughter Shamshad Banu. He died on 17 October 1994.

== Positions held ==
- Minister for Public Works from 25-01-1980 to 20–10–1981
- Chairman, Committee on Estimates (1991–94)
- Vice Chairman, Kerala State Financial Enterprises
- Member of the University of Calicut Senate
- Member Kerala Khadi Board
- President of mavoor Gwoliar rayons STU
- Member IUML National Executive
- Member Kerala State Muslim League High Power Committee
- Councillor, Calicut Corporation (1962–74)
- Deputy Mayor, Calicut Corporation
- State President, Indian National League
- Member of the 3rd, 5th, 6th, 7th, 8th and 9th Kerala Legislative Assembly

== Publications ==
- A Book on Prison Life.
