= Kevin Coppock =

Australian rules footballer (1932–2016)

Personal information
- Full name: Kevin Coppock
- Born: 9 May 1932
- Died: 29 November 2016 (aged 84)
- Original team: Maryborough
- Height: 183 cm (6 ft 0 in)
- Weight: 83 kg (183 lb)

Playing career^{1}
Years	Club	Games (Goals)
1953	Richmond	2 (0)
- ^{1} Playing statistics correct to the end of 1953.

Kevin Coppock (9 May 1932 – 29 November 2016) was an Australian rules footballer who played with Richmond in the Victorian Football League (VFL).
