= Dee Edwards (businesswoman) =

British entrepreneur, based in London

- Occupation: Entrepreneur

Dee Edwards is a British entrepreneur, based in London. She is a co-founder and managing director of Habbo, and runs a travel company in London named Tell Tale Travel.
