= Hedi Flitz =

German politician (1900–1994)

Member of the Bundestag
- In office 17 October 1961 – 17 October 1965

Personal details
- Born: 22 February 1900 Bad Ems
- Died: 19 October 1994 (aged 94)
- Party: FDP

Hedi Flitz (22 February 1900 – 19 October 1994) was a German politician of the Free Democratic Party (FDP) and former member of the German Bundestag.

== Life ==
Flitz was a member of the city council of Wilhelmshaven from 1956 to 1976. In the 1961 federal election she was elected to the German Bundestag via the state list of the FDP Lower Saxony, of which she was a member until 1965.

== Literature ==
Herbst, Ludolf; Jahn, Bruno (2002). Vierhaus, Rudolf (ed.). Biographisches Handbuch der Mitglieder des Deutschen Bundestages. 1949–2002 [Biographical Handbook of the Members of the German Bundestag. 1949–2002] (in German). München: De Gruyter - De Gruyter Saur. p. 1715. ISBN 978-3-11-184511-1.
