= Bob Wiggins (footballer) =

Australian rules footballer

Personal information
- Full name: Bob Wiggins
- Born: 8 November 1925
- Died: 29 August 2002 (aged 76)
- Original team: St James North Richmond
- Height: 185 cm (6 ft 1 in)
- Weight: 89 kg (196 lb)
- Position: Defence

Playing career^{1}
Years	Club	Games (Goals)
1944–51	Richmond	68 (2)
- ^{1} Playing statistics correct to the end of 1951.

Bob Wiggins (8 November 1925 – 29 August 2002) was a former Australian rules footballer who played with Richmond in the Victorian Football League (VFL).
