= Georges Poffé =

Belgian equestrian

Personal information
- Nationality: Belgian
- Born: 1931
- Died: 20 October 1994 (aged 62–63)

Sport
- Sport: Equestrian

Georges Poffé (1931 – 20 October 1994) was a Belgian equestrian. He competed in two events at the 1956 Summer Olympics.
