= John Ellis (Queensland cricketer) =

Australian cricketer

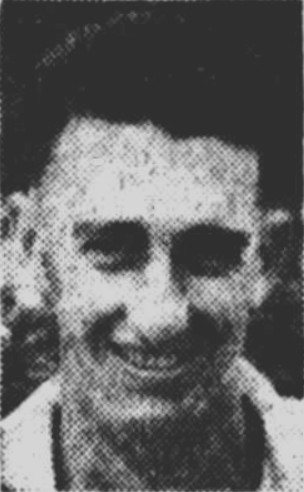

Personal information
- Born: 10 June 1914; Brisbane, Queensland, Australia
- Died: 17 October 1994 (aged 80); Brisbane, Queensland, Australia
- Source: Cricinfo, 3 October 2020

John Ellis (10 June 1914 – 17 October 1994) was an Australian cricketer. He played in 25 first-class matches for Queensland between 1938 and 1948.

== See also ==
- List of Queensland first-class cricketers
