= Colin Niven =

Australian rules footballer

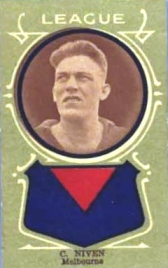

Personal information
- Full name: Colin Leslie Niven
- Born: 6 September 1903; Bealiba, Victoria
- Died: 1 December 1968 (aged 65); Cowes, Victoria
- Original team: Maryborough
- Height: 183 cm (6 ft 0 in)
- Weight: 90 kg (198 lb)
- Position: Follower

Playing career^{1}
Years	Club	Games (Goals)
1929–1932	Fitzroy	59 (16)
1933–1935	Melbourne	44 (13)
Total		103 (29)

Coaching career
Years	Club	Games (W–L–D)
1930–1931	Fitzroy	36 (11–25–0)
- ^{1} Playing statistics correct to the end of 1935.

Career highlights
- Fitzroy captain: 1930–1931; Melbourne captain: 1934–1935

Colin Niven (6 September 1903 – 1 December 1968) was an Australian rules footballer who played for Fitzroy and Melbourne in the Victorian Football League (VFL).

== Family ==
The son of Colin Niven (1870–1938), and Ida Bell Niven (1875–1947), née Lewis, Colin Leslie Niven was born at Bealiba, Victoria on 6 September 1903.

His cousin once removed, Gordon Jones, also played for Melbourne.

He married Ada Dorothy Smith in 1934.

== Footballer ==
Niven, a follower, played with Maryborough in the Ballarat Football League and won their 1927 best and fairest award, prior to joining Fitzroy. He captain-coached Fitzroy in 1930 and 1931 before crossing to Melbourne, which he captained in 1934 and 1935. His brother Ray, who played beside Colin in 1931, later reunited with him at Melbourne where they again appeared together in the same side.

After six months out of the game, Niven was appointed playing coach of Donald in 1936 and he led the team to premierships in 1936, 1937 and 1939 in the North Central Football League before retiring as a player.

== Military service ==
Niven later served in the Royal Australian Air Force during World War II.

== Death ==
He died at Cowes, Victoria on 1 December 1968.
