= Harry Harley (footballer) =

Australian rules footballer (1916–1994)

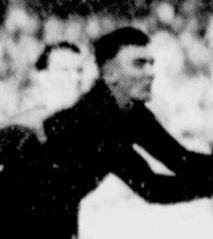

Personal information
- Full name: Harry Harley
- Born: 6 February 1916
- Died: 11 October 1994 (aged 78)
- Original team: Woomelang
- Height: 180 cm (5 ft 11 in)

Playing career^{1}
Years	Club	Games (Goals)
1938–39	Melbourne	20 (5)
- ^{1} Playing statistics correct to the end of 1939.

Harry Harley (6 February 1916 – 11 October 1994) was an Australian rules footballer who played with Melbourne in the Victorian Football League (VFL).
