= Jean-Claude Druart =

French footballer (1927–1994)

Personal information
- Date of birth: 25 August 1927
- Place of birth: Paris, France
- Date of death: 23 October 1994 (aged 67)
- Place of death: Charleville-Mézières, France
- Position: Midfielder

International career
Years	Team	Apps	(Gls)
- France

Jean-Claude Druart (25 August 1927 – 23 October 1994) was a French footballer. He competed in the men's tournament at the 1952 Summer Olympics.
