= Gordon Sumner (footballer) =

Australian rules footballer (born 1965)

Personal information
- Born: 10 February 1965 (age 61)
- Original team: Warburton Millgrove
- Height: 177 cm (5 ft 10 in)
- Weight: 74 kg (163 lb)

Playing career^{1}
Years	Club	Games (Goals)
1985–1986	Collingwood	26 (3)
- ^{1} Playing statistics correct to the end of 1986.

Gordon Sumner (born 10 February 1965) is a former Australian rules footballer who played with Collingwood in the Victorian Football League (VFL).

Sumner was recruited from Warburton Millgrove. On his debut, Sumner was one of the best afield for Collingwood, with 29 disposals (22 kicks), against the Sydney Swans at Victoria Park in the fifth round of the 1985 VFL season. He didn't miss a game for the rest of the year. In 1986 he played eight games, all early in the season.

In 2013, he was a senior assistant coach at the Silvan Football Club.
