= Allen Nilan =

Australian rules footballer

Personal information
- Full name: Allen Nilan
- Born: 1 April 1913
- Died: 10 October 1994 (aged 81)
- Original team: University Blues
- Height: 179 cm (5 ft 10 in)
- Weight: 72 kg (159 lb)

Playing career^{1}
Years	Club	Games (Goals)
1937	Fitzroy	1 (0)
- ^{1} Playing statistics correct to the end of 1937.

Michael Allen Kerins Nilan (1 April 1913 – 10 October 1994) was an Australian rules footballer who played for the Fitzroy Football Club in the Victorian Football League (VFL).. He was a teacher at the Dewhurst State School in Pakenham and served in New Guinea during World War 2.
