= Ignazio Dionisi =

Italian ice hockey player

Personal information
- Nationality: Italian
- Born: 27 February 1912; Milan, Italy
- Died: 1 October 1994 (aged 82); Milan, Italy

Sport
- Sport: Ice hockey

Ignazio Dionisi (27 February 1912 – 1 October 1994) was an Italian ice hockey player. He competed in the men's tournaments at the 1936 Winter Olympics and the 1948 Summer Olympics.
