= Ian McCann (Australian rules footballer) =

Australian rules footballer (1933–2018)

Personal information
- Full name: Clarence Ian McCann
- Born: 28 August 1933
- Died: 16 February 2018 (aged 84); Coburg
- Original team: Maryborough
- Height: 184 cm (6 ft 0 in)
- Weight: 80 kg (176 lb)

Playing career^{1}
Years	Club	Games (Goals)
1953–1955	Hawthorn	12 (3)
- ^{1} Playing statistics correct to the end of 1955.

Clarence Ian McCann (28 August 1933 – 16 February 2018) was an Australian rules footballer who played for the Hawthorn Football Club in the Victorian Football League (VFL).

Ian coached the Commonwealth Bank Football Club for two seasons in the VAFA's section B.

Ian was a member of Northern Golf Club, A Hall of Fame inductee at Pascoe Vale Central Cricket Club, a Broadmeadows Rotarian, a member of Commonwealth Bank Retired Officers Association, and lead vocalist in the trio The Hat Band performers at the British Isles Dance Club Brunswick for 25 years.

Ian served in the Army as a conscript.
