= Norma Dee Edwards =

Michigan politician (1912–1994)

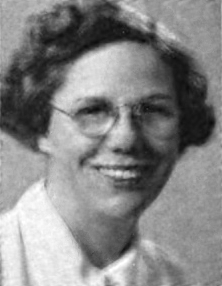

Member of the Michigan House of Representatives from the Wayne County 1st district
- In office January 1, 1949 – 1950

Personal details
- Born: July 11, 1912 Spring Arbor Township, Michigan, U.S.
- Died: October 26, 1994 (aged 82) Royal Oak, Michigan, U.S.
- Party: Democratic
- Education: Wayne State University; Detroit College of Law

Norma Dee Edwards, also known as Dee Edwards, (July 11, 1912 – October 26, 1994) was a Michigan politician.

== Early life ==
Edwards was born on July 11, 1912, in Spring Arbor Township, Michigan, to Arthur S. and Hazel F. Edwards. Edwards was from a family of ten siblings. At age thirteen, Edwards left home and became self-sufficient. She worked as a maid while attending high school.

== Education ==
Edwards attended Detroit public schools. Edwards first attended Wayne State University in 1931. After going to New York, she returned and earned her A.B. from the university in 1935. She also earned an L.L.B. from Detroit College of Law.

== Career ==
Edwards was a lawyer. On November 2, 1948, Edwards was elected to the Michigan House of Representatives where she represented the Wayne County 1st district from January 5, 1949, to 1950. Edwards was not elected to the same position in 1952. Edwards was a candidate in the Democratic primary for the Michigan Senate seat representing the 4th district in 1950. In 1962, Edwards was a candidate in a primary to be a delegate to the Michigan state constitutional convention from Wayne County 2nd district.

== Death ==
Edwards died on October 26, 1994, in Royal Oak, Michigan.
