= Kunigunde Bachl =

German physician and politician (1919–1994)

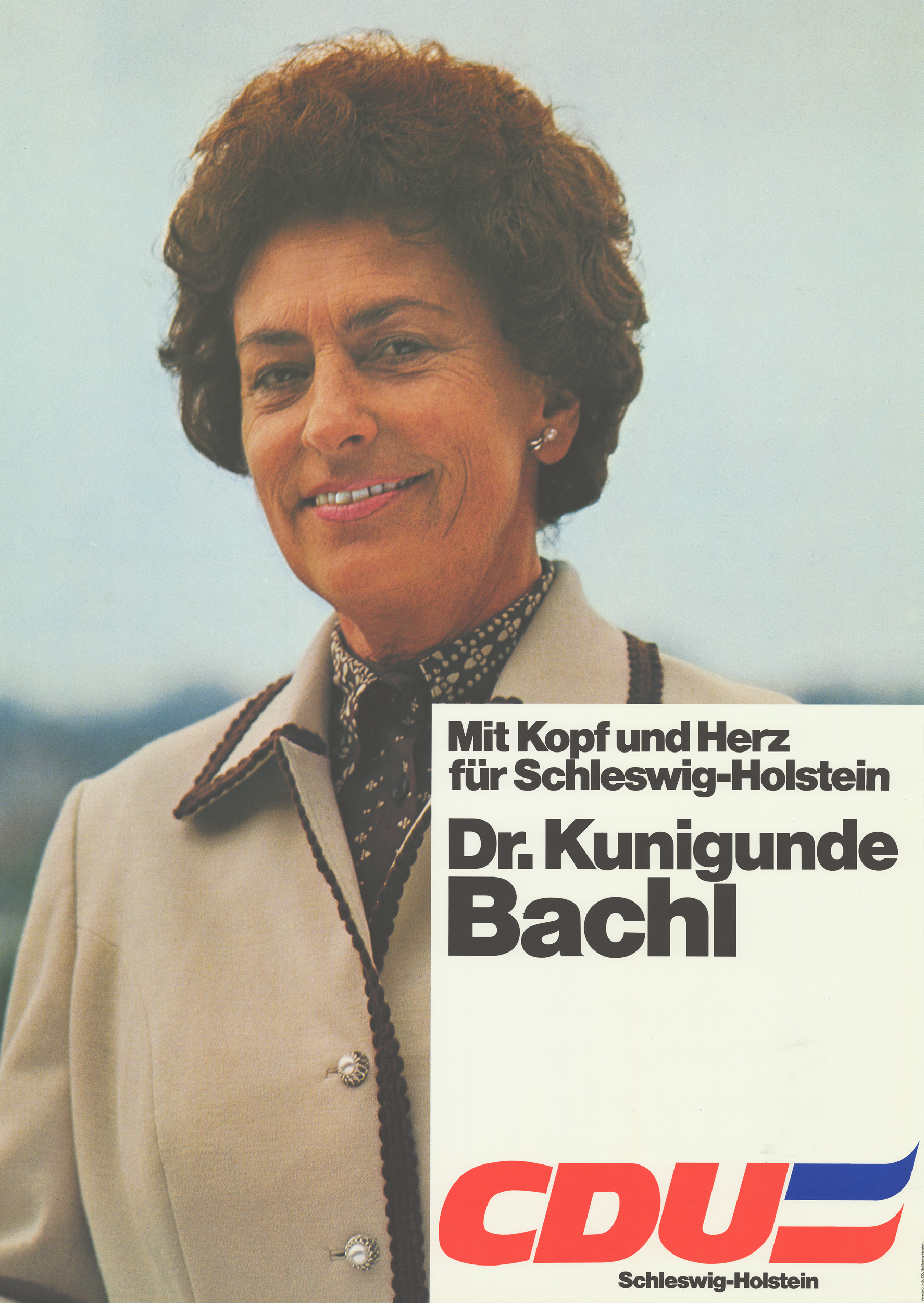
- Bachl in 1979

Member of the Landtag of Schleswig-Holstein
- In office 4 November 1980 – 2 October 1987
- In office 19 January 1978 – 26 May 1979
- In office 24 May 1971 – 24 May 1975

Personal details
- Born: Kunigunde Triptow; 29 July 1919 Kiel, Free State of Prussia, Germany
- Died: 16 October 1994 (aged 75)
- Party: Nazi Party (1940–1945); Christian Democratic Union (1969–1994)
- Spouse: Herr Bachl
- Children: 3
- Education: German Sport University Cologne; Ludwig-Maximilians-Universität München; Marburg University (Dr. med.)

Kunigunde Bachl (née Triptow; 29 July 1919 – 16 October 1994) was a German physician and politician who served in the Landtag of Schleswig-Holstein non-consecutively from 1971 until 1987. A member of the Christian Democratic Union, she advocated for car safety while in the state parliament, and was a member of the Federal Assembly in 1974. In 1973, Bachl became the president of the Schleswig-Holstein branch of the German Association of Female Doctors.

== Biography ==
Kunigunde Bachl was born in the city of Kiel on 29 July 1919. After receiving her Abitur in 1938, she began studying physical education at the German Sport University Cologne, graduating the following year. On 1 September 1940, Bachl joined the Nazi Party; historian Uwe Danker classifies her as "NS-socialized", which refers to party members who grew up after the Nazi seizure of power. She worked as a physical education teacher from 1940 until 1941, when she began studying medicine. She attended the Ludwig-Maximilians-Universität München in 1942 and 1943. In 1947, Bachl graduated from Marburg University with a Doctor of Medicine degree. She later began working as an assistant physician, and became a general practitioner in 1964.

In 1969, Bachl joined the Christian Democratic Union. She was a member of the Kiel school and health committees from 1970 until 1971. In 1971, she became a member of the local CDU board and the state women's council. Bachl was elected to the Landtag of Schleswig-Holstein in the 1971 state election on the state list, becoming one of five women elected to the state parliament. During this term, she was a member of the Social Committee, the Municipal Investment Fund Committee, and a special committee investigating a women's clinic in Kiel. In 1972, following an increase in car-related fatalities among young men in the state, Bachl advocated for seatbelt regulations and blamed the increase on machismo, stating that cars "must remain a means of transport and must not become a status symbol". The following year, she became a member of the state CDU board, and was named president of the Schleswig-Holstein branch of the German Association of Female Doctors. Bachl was a member of the 6th Federal Assembly on 15 May 1974. She left the Landtag at the end of her term on 24 May 1975. In 1977, she became the deputy chairman of the state health advisory board.

On 19 January 1978, Bachl was appointed to the Landtag. She served on the Youth Committee, and left office at the end of her term on 26 May 1979. On 4 November 1980, Bachl was again appointed to the Landtag. She was re-elected in the 1983 state election. In both terms, she was a member of the Finance Committee and the Social Committee. Bachl left office at the end of her term on 2 October 1987.

Bachl was an evangelical, and was married with three children. She died on 16 October 1994.

== Honors ==
- Cross of Merit on Ribbon of the Federal Republic of Germany (14 April 1975)
- Cross of Merit 1st Class of the Federal Republic of Germany (9 August 1983)

== Publications ==
- Bachl, Kunigunde (1947). Knochenmetastasen bei Mammacarcinom [Bone Metastases in Breast Cancer] (in German). Marburg: Marburg University. (Thesis)
