= Fred Coppock =

Australian rules footballer, born 1905

Personal information
- Full name: Fred Coppock
- Born: 18 January 1905
- Died: 23 January 1965 (aged 60)
- Original team: Castlemaine
- Height: 178 cm (5 ft 10 in)
- Weight: 79 kg (174 lb)

Playing career^{1}
Years	Club	Games (Goals)
1930	Footscray	9 (1)
- ^{1} Playing statistics correct to the end of 1930.

Fred Coppock (18 January 1905 – 23 January 1965) was a former Australian rules footballer who played with Footscray in the Victorian Football League (VFL).
