= List of Melbourne Football Club seasons =

This is a list of seasons competed by the Melbourne Football Club. The team was founded in 1858, and was fundamental in developing the rules of Australian rules football and organizing the first competitions. Melbourne was a founding member of the Victorian Football Association (VFA) in 1877, which, alongside the South Australian Football Association (SAFA), were the first ever Australian rules football associations. In 1897, Melbourne was a founding member of the breakaway Victorian Football League (VFL) – renamed the Australian Football League (AFL) in 1990 – which they have remained in ever since.

In their long history, Melbourne have had long periods of success but also long periods of failure. During the nine VFA premiership seasons in which Melbourne took part, they never won the premiership. They have won the AFL premiership 13 times, most recently in 2021, which was the club's first premiership since 1964. After their 1964 premiership, Melbourne missed the finals for 22 consecutive seasons, the third-longest such drought in VFL/AFL history.

== Seasons ==
Premiership	Runners-up	Minor premiership	Finals berth	Wooden spoon

League Season	Melbourne Season	League	Home-and-away season results				Finals results	Coach	Captain
League Season	Melbourne Season	League	Finish	Wins	Losses	Draws	Finals results	Coach	Captain
Victorian Football Association (VFA)
1877	1877	VFA	—	16	3	4	Not held	—	Bob Sillett
1878	1878	VFA	—	11	7	5	Not held	—	Bob Sillett
1879	1879	VFA	—	11	6	4	Not held	—	Bob Sillett
1880	1880	VFA	—	9	5	8	Not held	—	James Bennie
1881	1881	VFA	—	14	6	4	Not held	—	Sam Lamrock
1882	1882	VFA	—	6	13	4	Not held	—	Dave Rannard
1883	1883	VFA	—	12	10	2	Not held	—	Murdoch McKenzie
1884	1884	VFA	—	10	13	3	Not held	—	John Macdonald
1885	1885	VFA	—	6	15	2	Not held	—	George Aitken; Frederick Franks
1886	1886	VFA	—	13	10	1	Not held	—	Howard Morrison
1887	1887	VFA	—	7	11	2	Not held	—	James Kelly
VFA premiership officially established
1888	1888	VFA	11th	4	14	1	Not held	—	Howard King
1889	1889	VFA	11th	4	16	1	Not held	—	Eddie Fox
1890	1890	VFA	8th	6	9	4	Not held	—	Eddie Fox
1891	1891	VFA	6th	8	6	5	Not held	—	Eddie Fox
1892	1892	VFA	4th	10	5	3	Not held	—	William Aitken; Eddie Fox
1893	1893	VFA	2nd	16	3	2	Not held	—	Eddie Fox
1894	1894	VFA	2nd	13	5	0	Not held	—	Eddie Fox
1895	1895	VFA	2nd (Note: In a 3-way tie with Collingwood and Geelong for 2nd place.)	13	5	0	Not held	—	Eddie Fox; Joe Wilson
1896	1896	VFA	4th (Note: In a 2-way tie with Fitzroy for 4th place.)	12	6	0	Not held	—	Joe Wilson
Victorian Football League (VFL)
1897	1897	VFL	3rd	10	4	0	Lost round-robin match (Collingwood) 51–47; Lost round-robin match (Geelong) 46–37; Lost round-robin match (Essendon) 14–8	—	Ned Sutton
1898	1898	VFL	6th	6	10	1	Lost round-robin match (Geelong) 78–16; Won round-robin match (St Kilda) 38–17; Lost round-robin match (Collingwood) 55–41	—	Ned Sutton
1899	1899	VFL	5th	8	9	0	Lost round-robin match (Collingwood) 45–25; Lost round-robin match (Fitzroy) 40–2; Lost round-robin match (Carlton) 41–16	—	Eddie Sholl
1900	1900	VFL	6th	8	9	0	Won round-robin match (Geelong) 45–28; Won round-robin match (St Kilda) 86–15; Lost round-robin match (Collingwood) 30–24; Won semi-final (Essendon) 45–43; Won Grand Final (Fitzroy) 34–30	—	Dick Wardill
1901	1901	VFL	5th	9	7	1		—	William C. McClelland
1902	1902	VFL	4th	9	8	0	Lost semi-final (Essendon) 61–51	—	William C. McClelland
1903	1903	VFL	7th	3	14	0		—	William C. McClelland
1904	1904	VFL	6th	8	9	0		—	William C. McClelland
1905	1905	VFL	8th	3	14	0		—	Frank Langley
1906	1906	VFL	8th	1	16	0		—	Arthur Sowden
1907	1907	VFL	7th	7	10	0		Alec Hall	Vin Coutie
1908	1908	VFL	8th	7	11	0		Alec Hall	Hugh Purse
1909	1909	VFL	5th	10	7	1		Alec Hall	Bernie Nolan
1910	1910	VFL	9th	4	14	0		Eddie Drohan	Vin Coutie
1911	1911	VFL	7th	7	10	1		—	Vin Coutie
1912	1912	VFL	6th	9	9	0		Alec Hall	Alf George
1913	1913	VFL	9th	4	14	0		Alec Hall	Alf George
1914	1914	VFL	9th	2	16	0		Len Incigneri	
1915	1915	VFL	4th	9	7	0	Lost semi-final (Carlton) 78–67	Jack McKenzie	
1916	Did not play due to World War I								
1917	Did not play due to World War I								
1918	Did not play due to World War I								
1919	1919	VFL	9th	0	16	0		George Heinz	
1920	1920	VFL	8th	5	11	0		Gerald Brosnan	George Heinz
1921	1921	VFL	6th	6	8	2		Percy Wilson	
1922	1922	VFL	6th	7	9	0		Percy Wilson	
1923	1923	VFL	9th	3	13	0		Percy Wilson	
1924	1924	VFL	8th	4	12	0		Gordon Rattray	Bert Chadwick
1925	1925	VFL	3rd	12	4	1	Won semi-final (Geelong) 101–86; Lost preliminary final (Collingwood) 63–26	Bert Chadwick	
1926	1926	VFL	3rd	14	4	0	Won semi-final (Collingwood) 95–84; Won Preliminary Final (Essendon) 42–39; Won Grand Final (Collingwood) 119–62	Bert Chadwick	
1927	1927	VFL	5th	12	6	0		Bert Chadwick	
1928	1928	VFL	3rd	14	4	0	Drew Semi-final (Collingwood) 62–62; Lost semi-final replay (Collingwood) 68–64	Ivor Warne-Smith	
1929	1929	VFL	5th	11	6	1		Ivor Warne-Smith	
1930	1930	VFL	5th	11	7	0		Ivor Warne-Smith	
1931	1931	VFL	8th	8	10	0		Ivor Warne-Smith	
1932	1932	VFL	9th	4	14	0		Ivor Warne-Smith	Francis Vine
1933	1933	VFL	10th	3	15	0		Frank Hughes	Francis Vine
1934	1934	VFL	6th	9	9	0		Frank Hughes	Colin Niven
1935	1935	VFL	6th	8	9	1		Frank Hughes	Colin Niven
1936	1936	VFL	4th	12	6	0	Won semi-final (Carlton) 97–88; Lost preliminary final (South Melbourne) 89–63	Frank Hughes	Allan La Fontaine
1937	1937	VFL	2nd	15	3	0	Lost semi-final (Geelong) 125–113; Lost preliminary final (Collingwood) 107–52	Frank Hughes	Allan La Fontaine
1938	1938	VFL	5th	11	7	0		Frank Hughes	Allan La Fontaine
1939	1939	VFL	1st	15	3	0	Won semi-final (Collingwood) 104–90; Won Grand Final (Collingwood) 148–95	Frank Hughes	Allan La Fontaine
1940	1940	VFL	1st	14	4	0	Lost semi-final (Richmond) 107–101; Won Preliminary Final (Essendon) 90–85; Won Grand Final (Richmond) 107–68	Frank Hughes	Allan La Fontaine
1941	1941	VFL	2nd	14	4	0	Won semi-final (Carlton) 109–82; Won Grand Final (Essendon) 127–98	Frank Hughes	Allan La Fontaine
1942	1942	VFL	8th	5	10	0		Percy Beames	
1943	1943	VFL	7th	7	8	0		Percy Beames	
1944	1944	VFL	8th	7	11	0		Percy Beames	
1945	1945	VFL	9th	8	12	0		Frank Hughes	Norm Smith
1946	1946	VFL	4th	13	6	0	Won semi-final (Footscray) 120–102; Won Preliminary Final (Collingwood) 113–100; Lost Grand Final (Essendon) 150–87	Frank Hughes	Norm Smith
1947	1947	VFL	6th	11	8	0		Frank Hughes	Norm Smith
1948	1948	VFL	2nd	13	6	0	Lost semi-final (Essendon) 94–58; Won Preliminary Final (Collingwood) 166–101; Drew Grand Final (Essendon) 69–69; Won Grand Final replay (Essendon) 89–50	Frank Hughes	Don Cordner
1949	1949	VFL	5th	12	7	0		Allan La Fontaine	Don Cordner
1950	1950	VFL	3rd	12	6	0	Lost semi-final (Geelong) 88–44	Allan La Fontaine	Shane McGrath
1951	1951	VFL	12th	1	17	0		Allan La Fontaine	Denis Cordner
1952	1952	VFL	6th	9	9	1		Norm Smith	Denis Cordner
1953	1953	VFL	11th	3	14	1		Norm Smith	Denis Cordner
1954	1954	VFL	4th	11	7	0	Won semi-final (North Melbourne) 110–80; Won Preliminary Final (Geelong) 67–50; Lost Grand Final (Footscray) 102–51	Norm Smith	Geoff Collins
1955	1955	VFL	1st	15	3	0	Won semi-final (Collingwood) 56–45; Won Grand Final (Collingwood) 64–36	Norm Smith	Noel McMahen
1956	1956	VFL	1st	16	2	0	Won semi-final (Collingwood) 80–64; Won Grand Final (Collingwood) 121–48	Norm Smith	Noel McMahen
1957	1957	VFL	1st	12	5	1	Lost semi-final (Essendon) 83–67; Won Preliminary Final (Hawthorn) 144–76; Won Grand Final (Essendon) 116–55	Norm Smith	John Beckwith
1958	1958	VFL	1st	15	3	0	Won semi-final (Collingwood) 78–33; Lost Grand Final (Collingwood) 82–64	Norm Smith	John Beckwith
1959	1959	VFL	1st	13	4	1	Won semi-final (Carlton) 81–37; Won Grand Final (Essendon) 115–78	Norm Smith	John Beckwith
1960	1960	VFL	1st	14	4	0	Won semi-final (Fitzroy) 102–40; Won Grand Final (Collingwood) 62–14	Norm Smith	Ron Barassi
1961	1961	VFL	2nd	12	5	1	Lost semi-final (Hawthorn) 80–73; Lost preliminary final (Footscray) 85–58	Norm Smith	Ron Barassi
1962	1962	VFL	3rd	14	4	0	Lost semi-final (Carlton) 78–76	Norm Smith	Ron Barassi
1963	1963	VFL	3rd	13	5	0	Won semi-final (St Kilda) 71–64; Lost preliminary final (Hawthorn) 77–68	Norm Smith	Ron Barassi
1964	1964	VFL	1st	14	4	0	Won semi-final (Collingwood) 134–45; Won Grand Final (Collingwood) 64–60	Norm Smith (Note: Ron Barassi was the coach for one match.)	Ron Barassi
1965	1965	VFL	7th	10	8	0		Norm Smith (Note: Frank Hughes was the coach for one match.)	Hassa Mann
1966	1966	VFL	11th	3	15	0		Norm Smith	Hassa Mann
1967	1967	VFL	7th	8	10	0		Norm Smith	Hassa Mann
1968	1968	VFL	8th	8	12	0		John Beckwith	Hassa Mann
1969	1969	VFL	12th	3	17	0		John Beckwith	Tassie Johnson
1970	1970	VFL	10th	6	16	0		John Beckwith	Frank Davis
1971	1971	VFL	7th	11	10	1		Ian Ridley	Frank Davis
1972	1972	VFL	8th	10	12	0		Ian Ridley	Frank Davis
1973	1973	VFL	10th	7	15	0		Ian Ridley	Stan Alves
1974	1974	VFL	12th	3	19	0		Bob Skilton	Stan Alves
1975	1975	VFL	10th	9	13	0		Bob Skilton	Stan Alves
1976	1976	VFL	6th	11	11	0		Bob Skilton	Stan Alves
1977	1977	VFL	11th	5	17	0		Bob Skilton	Greg Wells
1978	1978	VFL	12th	5	17	0		Dennis Jones	Greg Wells
1979	1979	VFL	11th	6	16	0		Carl Ditterich (Note: Frank Davis was the coach for one match.)	
1980	1980	VFL	9th	5	17	0		Carl Ditterich	
1981	1981	VFL	12th	1	21	0		Ron Barassi	Robert Flower
1982	1982	VFL	8th	8	14	0		Ron Barassi	Robert Flower
1983	1983	VFL	8th	9	13	0		Ron Barassi	Robert Flower
1984	1984	VFL	9th	9	13	0		Ron Barassi	Robert Flower
1985	1985	VFL	11th	6	16	0		Ron Barassi	Robert Flower
1986	1986	VFL	11th	7	15	0		John Northey	Robert Flower
1987	1987	VFL	5th	12	10	0	Won Elimination Final (North Melbourne) 158–40; Won semi-final (Sydney) 149–73; Lost preliminary final (Hawthorn) 80–78	John Northey	Robert Flower
1988	1988	VFL	5th	13	9	0	Won Elimination Final (West Coast) 73–71; Won semi-final (Collingwood) 95–82; Won Preliminary Final (Carlton) 120–98; Lost Grand Final (Hawthorn) 152–56	John Northey	Greg Healy
1989	1989	VFL	4th	14	8	0	Won Elimination Final (Collingwood) 111–88; Lost semi-final (Geelong) 153–90	John Northey	Greg Healy
Australian Football League (AFL)
1990	1990	AFL	4th	16	6	0	Won Elimination Final (Hawthorn) 73–64; Lost semi-final (West Coast) 130–100	John Northey	Greg Healy
1991	1991	AFL	5th	13	9	0	Won Elimination Final (Essendon) 113–75; Lost semi-final (West Coast) 117–79	John Northey	Garry Lyon
1992	1992	AFL	11th	7	14	1		John Northey	Garry Lyon
1993	1993	AFL	10th	10	10	0		Neil Balme	Garry Lyon
1994	1994	AFL	7th	12	10	0	Won Qualifying Final (Carlton) 123–96; Won semi-final (Footscray) 144–65; Lost preliminary final (West Coast) 117–52	Neil Balme	Garry Lyon
1995	1995	AFL	9th	9	13	0		Neil Balme	Garry Lyon
1996	1996	AFL	14th	7	15	0		Neil Balme	Garry Lyon
1997	1997	AFL	16th	4	18	0		Neil Balme; Greg Hutchison	Garry Lyon
1998	1998	AFL	4th	14	8	0	Won Qualifying Final (Adelaide) 115–67; Won semi-final (St Kilda) 107–56; Lost preliminary final (North Melbourne) 114–84	Neale Daniher	Todd Viney
1999	1999	AFL	14th	6	16	0		Neale Daniher	Todd Viney
2000	2000	AFL	3rd	14	8	0	Won Qualifying Final (Carlton) 96–87; Won Preliminary Final (North Melbourne) 156–106; Lost Grand Final (Essendon) 135–75	Neale Daniher	David Neitz
2001	2001	AFL	11th	10	12	0		Neale Daniher	David Neitz
2002	2002	AFL	6th	12	10	0	Won Elimination Final (North Melbourne) 122–84; Lost semi-final (Adelaide) 130–118	Neale Daniher	David Neitz
2003	2003	AFL	14th	5	17	0		Neale Daniher	David Neitz
2004	2004	AFL	5th	14	8	0	Lost Elimination Final (Essendon) 104–99	Neale Daniher	David Neitz
2005	2005	AFL	7th	12	10	0	Lost Elimination Final (Geelong) 116–61	Neale Daniher	David Neitz
2006	2006	AFL	7th	13	8	1	Won Elimination Final (St Kilda) 90–72; Lost semi-final (Fremantle) 102–74	Neale Daniher	David Neitz
2007	2007	AFL	14th	5	17	0		Neale Daniher; Mark Riley	David Neitz
2008	2008	AFL	16th	3	19	0		Dean Bailey	David Neitz
2009	2009	AFL	16th	4	18	0		Dean Bailey	James McDonald
2010	2010	AFL	12th	8	13	1		Dean Bailey	James McDonald
2011	2011	AFL	13th	8	13	1		Dean Bailey; Todd Viney	Brad Green
2012	2012	AFL	16th	4	18	0		Mark Neeld	Jack Grimes; Jack Trengove
2013	2013	AFL	17th	2	20	0		Mark Neeld; Neil Craig	Jack Grimes; Jack Trengove
2014	2014	AFL	17th	4	18	0		Paul Roos	Jack Grimes; Nathan Jones
2015	2015	AFL	13th	7	15	0		Paul Roos	Nathan Jones
2016	2016	AFL	11th	10	12	0		Paul Roos	Nathan Jones
2017	2017	AFL	9th	12	10	0		Simon Goodwin	Nathan Jones; Jack Viney
2018	2018	AFL	5th	14	8	0	Won Elimination Final (Geelong) 75–46; Won semi-final (Hawthorn) 104–71; Lost preliminary final (West Coast) 121–55	Simon Goodwin	Nathan Jones; Jack Viney
2019	2019	AFL	17th	5	17	0		Simon Goodwin	Nathan Jones; Jack Viney
2020	2020	AFL	9th	9	8	0		Simon Goodwin	Max Gawn
2021	2021	AFL	1st	17	4	1	Won Qualifying Final (Brisbane) 134–45; Won Preliminary Final (Geelong) 125–42; Won Grand Final (Western) 140–66	Simon Goodwin	Max Gawn
2022	2022	AFL	2nd	16	6	0	Lost Qualifying Final (Sydney) 91–69; Lost semi-final (Brisbane) 92–79	Simon Goodwin	Max Gawn
2023	2023	AFL	4th	16	7	0	Lost Qualifying Final (Collingwood) 60–53; Lost semi-final (Carlton) 73–71	Simon Goodwin	Max Gawn
2024	2024	AFL	14th	11	12	0		Simon Goodwin	Max Gawn
2025	2025	AFL	14th	7	16	0		Simon Goodwin	Max Gawn
2026*	2026	AFL	6th	12	6	0		Steven King	Max Gawn

== All-time win–loss records ==
League	Wins	Losses	Draws	Win %	Premierships
VFA (1877–1896)	201	168	55	.539	0 premierships
VFL/AFL (1897–2025) home-and-away season	1131	1335	20	.455	13 premierships 10 minor premierships
VFL/AFL (1897–2025) finals	57	46	2	.543	13 premierships 10 minor premierships
All-time results (1877–2025)	1389	1549	77	.461	
