= List of provincial clubs in the Victorian Football Association =

In the first decade of the Victorian Football Association (VFA), a number of provincial clubs were full administrative members of the association, but never played enough games against other clubs to be considered relevant in the premiership. These clubs were active from the first VFA season in 1877 until.

Notably, a number of 'junior teams' also competed alongside senior sides.

Almost all of these clubs folded after a single season, however a number still exist to this day and compete in local football leagues, including three in the Bendigo Football Netball League.

== List of provincial clubs ==
VFA Club	Colours	Moniker	Est.	VFA season(s)	Current league(s)				
VFA Club	Colours	Moniker	Est.	Barwon		Riverites	1874	1877–1878	Folded (1879)
Benalla				1882	Folded				
Castlemaine		Magpies	1859	1877	Folded*				
Colac/Camperdown		Magpies		1877	Folded				
Canning & Battery United				1879	Folded				
Chilwell			1874	1878–1881	Merged*				
Clifton Union				1883	Folded				
Daylesford		Bulldogs	1877	1880	Central Highlands				
East Geelong			1879	1880–1881	Geelong & District				
Geelong College				1878	Folded				
Geelong Imperial		Imps		1877	Folded				
Geelong Juniors		Juniors		1877	Folded				
Geelong Schools				1878–1881	Folded				
Inglewood				1877	Folded				
Kyneton		Tigers	1868	1877–1885	Bendigo				
Lincoln United			1877	1878	Folded				
Maryborough		Magpies	1872	1877–1884	Bendigo				
North Geelong		Magpies	1876	1878–1882	Geelong & District				
Public Schools				1877–1883	Folded				
Sale		Magpies	1877	1878–1883	Gippsland				
Sandhurst			1861	1877	Bendigo				
Warwick				1877	Folded				
Victorian Railways				1877	Folded				

- = Castlemaine were replaced by present-day Camperdown
- = Chilwell merged with Newtown in 1933 and are now competing in the Geelong Football Netball League as Newtown & Chilwell
