= South Melbourne vs Geelong (1886 VFA season) =

1886 VFA season

South Melbourne	Geelong
1.5	4.19
	1	2	3	4
SM	0.1	0.3	1.4	1.5
GEE	0.8	1.12	2.16	4.19
- Date: 4 September 1886
- Stadium: South Melbourne Cricket Ground
- Attendance: 30,000
- Umpires: James Shaw
- Coin toss won by: Geelong
- Kicked toward: Southern

On 4 September 1886, an Australian rules football match was played between the South Melbourne Football Club and the Geelong Football Club at the South Melbourne Cricket Ground. The match was part of the 1886 season of the Victorian Football Association. It was considered the sport's most important match of the 19th century, and is sometimes referred to in modern times as the Match of the Century.

Played late in the 1886 season, South Melbourne and Geelong both entered the match undefeated, meaning that it was nearly certain to decide the premiership. The match drew unprecedented public interest, and a then-record crowd of around 30,000 attended. Although scores remained close until the final quarter, the match was an ultimately a one-sided encounter, and Geelong 4.19 comfortably defeated South Melbourne 1.5 by a margin of three goals.

== Background ==
South Melbourne unbeaten streak

1884 VFA season

24 Sep 1884 vs Fitzroy 3.7 d. 1.15

1885 VFA season

18 Apr 1885 vs Union Jack (23) 7 d. 1
25 Apr 1885 vs South juniors (23) 4 d. 2
2 May 1885 vs Port Melbourne (23) 2.21 d. 0.1
9 May 1885 vs Carlton 4.12 d. 2.7
16 Mar 1885 vs Sunbury (23) 10.24 d. 0.0
23 May 1885 vs Port Adelaide 4.15 drew 4.5
25 May 1885 vs Ballarat Imperial 9.17 d. 1.6
30 May 1885 vs University 2.16 d. 0.10
6 June 1885 vs Essendon, cancelled
11 June 1885 vs A&S juniors (23) 8.22 d. 0.0
13 Jun 1885 vs Port Adelaide, cancelled
16 Jun 1885 vs Adelaide 5.10 d. 2.11
18 Jun 1885 vs Norwood 8.17 d 2.3
20 Jun 1885 vs South Adelaide 3.15 drew 3.6
22 Jun 1885 vs South Adelaide 8.16 d. 3.2
27 Jun 1885 vs Richmond 8.14 d. 0.4
4 July 1885 vs Geelong 2.9 drew 2.10
11 Jul 1885 vs Melbourne 12.17 d. 0.1
18 Jul 1885 vs Fitzroy 9.14 d. 0.8
25 Jul 1885 vs Hotham 8.14 d. 0.8
1 Aug 1885 vs Williamstown 6.10 d. 1.6
8 Aug 1885 vs University 12.15 d. 2.2
15 Aug 1885 vs Essendon 3.17 drew 3.10
22 Aug 1885 vs Melbourne 9.10 d. 2.7
29 Aug 1885 vs Geelong 5.11 d. 2.9
5 Sep 1885 vs Carlton 3.10 d. 1.7
12 Sep 1885 vs Fitzroy 4.11 d. 2.6
19 Sep 1885 vs Hotham 4.11 d. 2.5
26 Sep 1885 vs Richmond 9.9 d. 4.7

1886 VFA season

17 Apr 1886 vs South juniors (23) 2.5 d. 1.6
24 Apr 1886 vs South juniors (23) 2.11 drew 2.4
1 May 1886 vs Union Jack (23) 8.15 d. 0.0
8 May 1886 vs Port Melbourne 4.10 d. 3.9
15 May 1886 vs Melbourne 3.9 d. 2.5
24 May 1886 vs Footscray 7.20 d. 5.7
29 May 1886 vs Carlton 3.8 drew 3.10
5 Jun 1886 vs Williamstown 5.5 d. 3.15
12 Jun 1886 vs Essendon 2.20 d. 1.3
19 Jun 1886 vs Fitzroy 5.6 d. 2.10
26 Jun 1886 vs Geelong 3.13 drew 3.6
3 Jul 1886 vs Richmond 6.15 d. 2.7
10 Jul 1886 vs St Kilda 8.16 d. 2.0
17 Jul 1886 vs University 6.15 d. 2.8
24 Jul 1886 vs Hotham 7.9 d. 3.5
31 Jul 1886 vs Melbourne 6.14 d. 1.4
7 Aug 1886 vs Richmond 4.23 d. 1.8
14 Aug 1886 vs Footscray 6.18 d. 1.2
21 Aug 1886 vs Carlton 5.9 d. 3.12
28 Aug 1886 vs Essendon 8.9 d. 4.6

Geelong's unbeaten streak

1885 VFA season

19 Sep 1885 vs Williamstown 4.11 d. 3.15
26 Sep 1885 vs Melbourne 2.9 drew 2.10

1886 VFA season

17 Apr 1886 vs Geelong juniors (23) 3.17 d. 0.7
24 Apr 1886 vs Port Melbourne 3.11 drew 3.14
1 May 1886 vs Prahran 9.20 d. 0.0
8 May 1886 vs University 6.11 d. 2.6
15 May 1886 vs Williamstown 10.14 d. 0.8
22 May 1886 vs Ballarat Imperial 10.16 d. 5.3
24 May 1886 vs Hotham 3.18 drew 3.9
29 May 1886 vs New South Wales 14.17 d. 0.2
5 Jun 1886 vs St Kilda 10.20 d. 1.6
12 Jun 1886 vs Carlton 8.10 d. 3.18
19 Jun 1886 vs Essendon 8.12 d. 4.10
26 Jun 1886 vs South Melbourne 3.6 drew 3.13
3 Jul 1886 vs South Adelaide 8.8 d. 2.5
8 Jul 1886 vs A&S juniors (23) 6.10 d. 1.3
10 Jul 1886 vs Norwood 5.16 d. 3.12
13 Jul 1886 vs Port Adelaide 7.5 d. 4.10
15 Jul 1886 vs South Adelaide 7.15 d. 2.11
17 Jul 1886 vs Adelaide 7.5 d. 4.8
24 Jul 1886 vs Footscray 4.9 d. 1.4
31 Jul 1886 vs Ballarat 13.18 d. 2.5
7 Aug 1886 vs Hotham 6.16 d. 3.9
14 Aug 1886 vs Richmond 7.17 d. 1.16
21 Aug 1886 vs Williamstown 8.18 d. 2.3
28 Aug 1886 vs Fitzroy 10.17 d. 1.4
4 Sep 1886 vs South Melbourne 4.19 d. 1.5
11 Sep 1886 vs Carlton 10.16 d. 2.6
18 Sep 1886 vs Essendon 15.18 d. 0.7
25 Sep 1886 vs Melbourne 7.10 d. 2.6
2 Oct 1886 vs University, cancelled

1887 VFA season

23 Apr 1887 vs Geelong juniors (23) 8 d. 0
30 Apr 1887 vs South Ballarat 10.6 d. 4.4
7 May 1887 vs Richmond 9.18 d. 1.5
14 May 1887 vs Williamstown 5.15 d. 0.3
21 May 1887 vs Port Melbourne 8.10 d. 4.7
24 May 1887 vs Hotham 4.8 drew 4.12
28 May 1887 vs Fitzroy 9.7 d. 3.16
4 Jun 1887 vs Melbourne 7.8 d. 4.7

From the late 1870s until the 1880s, football in Victoria was dominated by two clubs: the South Melbourne Football Club, which had been the leading metropolitan club in Melbourne since its merger with Albert-park in 1880, and the Geelong Football Club, from the provincial city of Geelong. Between them, they had won the last eight VFA premierships: six by Geelong (1878, 1879, 1880, 1882, 1883 and 1884) and two by South Melbourne (1881 and 1885).

The 1886 VFA season saw both clubs near the peaks of their power, and when they met in their match on 4 September 1886, both clubs had amassed long unbeaten streaks:

- Geelong had not lost since 12 September 1885, and had an unbeaten streak of 26 matches. The club had a 13–0–2 record for the year thus far, and had also finished undefeated in a five-match tour of Adelaide in which it had faced all members of the SAFA. Across the season, it had scored more than four times as many goals as it had conceded and frequently dominated matches.
- South Melbourne's unbeaten run was even longer, having not lost since 20 September 1884, a streak of 48 matches, and South Melbourne's 1885 season had been as dominant as Geelong's 1886 season, with an undefeated premiership, an undefeated tour of South Australia, and four times as many goals scored as conceded. Its 1886 season was less dominant, as it had lost some champion players through defections to nearby rival club Port Melbourne which entered the VFA in 1886, but it was still on track for a second undefeated season: its premiership record stood at 15–0–2, and it had scored twice as many goals as it had conceded.

At the time, the VFA premiership was an unofficial title conferred by the press, and by convention it went to the club which lost the fewest premiership matches.^{N 1} The 4 September match had been arranged between secretaries at the start of the year, and the season still had a month to run after the match – but such was the two clubs' dominance over all others that it was considered a foregone conclusion that this match would decide the premiership. These combined circumstances meant that public interest in the match was unprecedented, and it was considered the most important match in Australian rules football history up to that point.

The two clubs had met once earlier in the season, on 26 June at Corio Oval in a drawn match; South Melbourne took the early lead, and Geelong kicked two goals in the final quarter to secure a draw. The home side, Geelong, finished with 3.5 to the visitors' 3.10. There was bad blood arising from the match: the South Melbourne team had arrived late after stopping in the town after their train arrived, resulting in the match being shortened by 20 minutes; in a dispute which played out as a series of letters to the editor of The Age newspaper over the following week, Geelong accused South Melbourne of doing this deliberately, since Geelong's small and speedy team was well known for dominating final quarters when its opponents were fatigued.

South Melbourne was a slight favourite with bettors, and a considerable amount of private wagering took place on the result.

== Match arrangements ==
=== Attendance and facilities ===
A record crowd attended the match, estimated by contemporary news reports as between 25,000 and 30,000. Modern references put the crowd at 34,121, a figure which would stand as the 11th-highest known VFA crowd of all time (as well as being the third-highest known VFA crowd in the 1877-1896 period), and remained a record crowd at the South Melbourne Cricket Ground until round 18 of 1923 in the VFL.

The crowd strongly supported the home team, and an estimated 2,000 spectators travelled from Geelong to Melbourne by two special trains for the match. South Melbourne reported a gate of £780 12s., more than twice the previous record.

In anticipation of a record crowd, the South Melbourne committee made improvements to the ground ahead of the match. Encroachment of the crowd into the playing arena was a common problem in the 1880s, which the committee dealt with by strengthening the fence and having police patrol the boundary, both on foot and on horseback. Part of the eastern fence still collapsed under the weight of the crowd prior to the game, but the crowd did not encroach and was considered overall to have been very well behaved.

Nevertheless, the venue was ill-equipped to handle such a large crowd – The Argus sportswriter described the scene as "25,000 packed into a ground capable of holding half of that", with shallow embankments meaning that as much as a third of the crowd could not see any action. Spectators scaled roofs, trees, fences and the pavilion's verandah for a better vantage point, with police having to intervene to stop some of the more dangerous attempts, and the flower garden in front of the pavilion was trampled.

To reduce the rush at the ground's ticket offices, 10,000 entry tickets were pre-sold at Boyle & Scott's and the Sports Depot in central Melbourne.

=== Arrangements ===
James Shaw was appointed field umpire, and R. C. Randall and F. Franks were appointed goal umpires. The goal umpires were given flags to signal scores: a red flag for a South Melbourne goal, a blue flag for a Geelong goal, and a white flag for a behind; it was one of the first matches in Victoria (although not the very first) to adopt the innovation, which Victorian clubs had first encountered on their tours of Tasmania during the year. Boundary umpires, who in 1886 were not mandatory but could be used at the agreement of the clubs, were not appointed.

The game was otherwise played under the standard Laws of the Game in 1886. Teams played twenty men per side. The game was divided into four quarters of thirty minutes, with a change of ends after each. Goals and behinds were recorded as part of the match score, but the final result was based only on the number of goals scored, with behinds serving a primarily statistical function. Behind posts were twenty yards from the goal posts, and little marks were permissible over a distance of five yards.

=== Other ===
On the night before the match, three men wrenched fishplates off the Melbourne-to-Geelong railway line at a culvert near Laverton, an act of vandalism which would have caused a train wreck had a passenger train traversed it at full speed; railway inspectors identified the damage in the early morning, and repaired the line with minimal disruption to services. News reporters speculated that the act may have been to disrupt the Geelong team's journey, but the perpetrators were never caught and the motive was unproven.

== Match summary ==
The match commenced at 3 pm. Geelong won the coin toss and kicked to the southern end of the ground, taking first use of the strong northerly breeze which blew across the ground throughout the match and made conditions difficult. South Melbourne kicked off.

=== First quarter ===
South Melbourne opened the match with a moment of trickery: as Roy lined up for the kick-off, Harper snuck in from the side and kicked off almost at right angles. Novel as this was, it was to little effect, as Geelong recovered and scored inside the first minute, Julien kicking a behind from the first shot at goal from a wide angle. South Melbourne rebounded the kick-off and managed two quick shots at goal, the first by Graves going out of bounds, and the second by Bushell from a set shot narrowly missing for a behind. Geelong attacked, and a 35yd set shot by Phil McShane was on target but touched through for a behind.

After these early chances, Geelong's speedy players dominated play for the remainder of the quarter with the wind, and most of the game being played on Geelong's eastern attacking forward pocket. However, Geelong was unable to convert the field position into a lead: behinds were kicked by Alec Boyd from an easy shot from 40 yards, McLean, Steedman, Boyd again from a free kick, Kerley after a kick to the goal square was fumbled by a team-mate, and Bailey from a set shot. Many other shots fell short, where they were marked and rebounded by the South Melbourne defenders, particularly Elms and Bodycomb. When the bell sounded for the first change of ends, scores were level: Geelong 0.8, South Melbourne 0.1.

=== Second quarter ===
South Melbourne now had the advantage of the wind; but after early end-to-end play, Geelong again settled into a position of territorial dominance. Two more behinds followed to Geelong: to McLean, and then to Kerley after South Melbourne's ensuing kick-off was turned over. Another shot by Galbraith was marked in the goal face by Elms. Finally, after McLean and Jack McShane won the ball out of the centre, the ball ended with Alec Boyd, who kicked Geelong's first goal from 40 yards. This gave Geelong its first lead, 1.10 to 0.1.

South Melbourne took possession from the kick-off and attacked, Harper scoring a behind. Geelong kicked the next two behinds, by Julien and McLean. O'Connor launched an attack for South Melbourne, and Burns was infringed, but managed only a behind from the free kick. There was no further scoring in the quarter, but a lot of spirited play in the centre of the ground. When the quarter ended, Geelong had a one-goal advantage: Geelong 1.12, South Melbourne 0.3.

=== Third quarter ===
Geelong had the wind advantage in the third quarter, and again was able to hold the ball at its end of the ground for long periods to start the quarter, and McLean scored the first behind. Then followed a series of attempts at goal by Phil McShane: his first, earned after Julien had won the ball from South Melbourne's Young, missed for a behind; his next two fell short and were marked by the South Melbourne defenders; and with his next, from a set shot directly in front after receiving a mark from Foote, he scored his first goal, giving Geelong a 2.14 to 0.3 advantage. Geelong won the ball on the wing after the next kick-off, and Bailey kicked a behind.

South Melbourne then attacked, Mat Minchin gaining ground through the middle and passing to Roy, whose shot was rushed through by Sam Boyd. Minchin regained possession from Geelong's kick-off, passing the ball with Graves to Bushell, who kicked his team's first goal of the game. The quarter finished evenly, Geelong securing one more behind by Steedman. At the final change of ends, Geelong held a one-goal advantage: Geelong 2.16, South Melbourne 1.4.

=== Final quarter ===
Geelong had dominated the game to this point and reputation for strong final quarters, but South Melbourne had the wind advantage and only a one-goal deficit, setting up a potentially exciting finish. South Melbourne attacked first and quickly, Harper kicking an early behind from a long set shot; but, it was his team's last score, and thereafter Geelong controlled play entirely. Geelong advanced, and with Hickinbotham effectively repelling any South Melbourne rebounds from the centre of the field, Geelong again held field position for the majority of the quarter. Geelong scored its third goal early in the quarter: Hickinbotham kicked to the goal face, Foote shepherded the defender Elms away, and Phil McShane picked the ball up and snapped it through from close range; Foote and Elms wrestled after the goal and had to be separated, and many reporters considered Elms had been illegally held in the play. Geelong managed further scores with a behind to Julien, another goal to Phil McShane from a set shot after receiving a little mark from McLean, and behinds to Hickinbotham and Jack McShane. When the bell rang, the final score was Geelong 4.19, South Melbourne 1.5.

=== Overview ===
Overall, Geelong's win was comprehensive. Geelong's play was too fast for the bigger-bodied South Melbourne players, their short kicking and teamwork were exemplary, and they won key matchups in the centre of the ground which gave them a territory advantage for most of the game. South Melbourne was tactically disorganised, fumbled and held onto the ball much more than it usually did, and failed to execute its little marking game effectively. On both sides the game was scrappy overall, not played at a high pace and with relatively few big runs or scrimmages, and even Geelong's skills weren't considered up to its usual standard. Despite Geelong's dominance, the score remained close until late in the final quarter, owing almost entirely to Geelong's goalkicking accuracy, which was poor by its usual standards; this was partly blamed on the blustery breeze and even on the condition of the old football which South Melbourne had supplied.

Geelong captain Dave Hickinbotham was considered by sportswriters in the Argus, the Sportsman and the Age to be the best player on the ground; playing in the centre, he regularly won contests, halted South Melbourne's attempts to rebound and advance, and ultimately gave Geelong its strong territory advantage. Jack Kerley, also playing in the centre, was considered Geelong's best in the Australasian and the Leader; Hugh McLean, who also played across Geelong's centre, and crack forward Phil McShane who finished with three goals were also among the best.

South Melbourne's best players were its defenders who were put under immense pressure by Geelong's dominance; captain Henry Elms was unanimously considered South Melbourne's best player, and the best on ground overall by the Leader. Hill, Young and Bodycomb were also strong for South Melbourne in defence, Mat Minchin its best in the centre, and Harper was its best attacking player.

== Aftermath ==
Both clubs won their remaining three matches of the 1886 season with relative ease. As such, Geelong won the premiership with an undefeated 17–0–2 record, its seventh premiership in nine seasons; South Melbourne finished second with a 18–1–2 record. Geelong continued its unbeaten streak until 11 June 1887, a total of 38 matches overall.

However, it was the last premiership of Geelong's decade-long period of dominance, and the club did not win another premiership until 1925 in the VFL: surviving members of the 4 September 1886 team were on hand to congratulate the premiers after the grand final. South Melbourne continued as the VFA's top metropolitan club for another half-decade, and won three consecutive premierships between 1888 and 1890.

The sneaky short kick-off which South Melbourne used at the start of the game was banned by the VFA in 1889, with the kick off being discontinued altogether in favour of the centre bounce in 1891.

Both clubs still compete to the present day in the fully professional Australian Football League: South Melbourne relocated to Sydney at the end of 1981 to become the Sydney Swans.

== Scorecard ==
1886 VFA season
Saturday, 4 September (3:00 pm)	South Melbourne	def. by	Geelong	South Melbourne Cricket Ground (crowd: 30,000)
0.1; 0.3; 1.4; 1.5	Q1; Q2; Q3; Final	0.8; 1.12; 2.16; 4.19	Umpires: James Shaw
Bushell	Goals	P. McShane 3, A. Boyd
Elms, Young, Hill, Bodycomb, M. Minchin, Harper	Best	Hickinbotham, Kerley, McLean, P. McShane, A. Boyd, Morrison, Bailey, Julien

== Teams ==
South Melbourne
R. Bodycomb	Peter Burns	William Bushby
Tom Bushell	Bill Docherty	T. Dickeson
Henry Elms (c)	Fred Graves	A. Harper (vc)
E. Hill	J. Minchin	Mat Minchin
Jim McDonald	Dinny McKay	O'Connor
Harry Purdy	Roy	Harry Smith
Smith	Jimmy Young	

Geelong
Jim Bailey	Alec Boyd	Sam Boyd
Percy Douglass	Billy Foote	Fred Furnell
Jim Galbraith	Dave Hickinbotham (c)	F. James
Jim Julien	Gus Kearney	Jack Kerley
Hugh McLean	Jack McShane	Phil McShane
Arthur Morrison	Tommy Mullen	Alec Robertson
Harry Steedman	Bob Talbot (vc)	

The club's twenties are listed above. For Geelong, Dick Groves was selected to play, but withdrew from the team following the death of his brother; he was replaced by F. James, and the few Geelong players who wore long sleeved guernseys wore crape armbands in his memory.

=== William Bushby ===
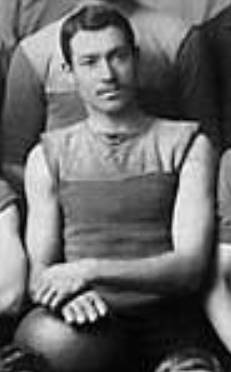
William Bushby (Port Adelaide) played for South Melbourne in the match.

Most notable among the selections for South Melbourne was William Bushby, the captain of the Port Adelaide Football Club and one of South Australia's finest players. Bushby had left Adelaide for Melbourne on 24 August and ended up playing the last five matches of the season for South Melbourne, of which the Geelong match was the second. The true circumstances of Bushby's recruitment are not known for certain. Bushby stated in a letter to the Herald newspaper that he had come to Melbourne in search of work and that he was not paid by South Melbourne to play, but this account is seldom fully believed; Adelaide's Sporting Chronicle reported from the outset that Bushby was recruited by the club to remain in Melbourne only until the end of the season, and this version of events is generally considered nearer to the truth. He returned to Port Adelaide from the 1887 season.

Geelong lodged a post facto protest against Bushby's inclusion on at the VFA general meeting 10 September, which was dismissed. Under the rules at the time, there was a cut-off for new permits on 15 July, and had Bushby played for another VFA club since that date, he would not have been able to transfer to South Melbourne; but, since the jurisdiction of the VFA's permit rules did not extend to clubs outside the VFA, Bushby's matches for Port Adelaide since 15 July did not exclude him from a transfer. It was the first case of a crack player being imported from another colony to bolster a club for a big match, at a time when both this and professionalism were frowned upon.

Whatever the circumstances of his recruitment, Bushby's performance in the big match was famously poor: he was tasked with defending Geelong captain Dave Hickinbotham and failed utterly, Hickinbotham finishing as the dominant player on the ground and Bushby barely earning a possession. The contrast between Bushby's high-profile recruitment and his low-quality performance was so stark that it became one of the seminal moments of the game; and even fifty years later, it was still regularly recounted as a symbol of South Melbourne's failure in the match.

== Footnotes ==
1. Conventionally, matches played against senior opponents in Victoria, on Saturdays or the Queen's Birthday holiday between May and September, were counted by the press as 'premiership games', although there were still some differences between what each major newspaper would choose to include.
