= George Coulthard =

Australian sportsman (1856–1883)

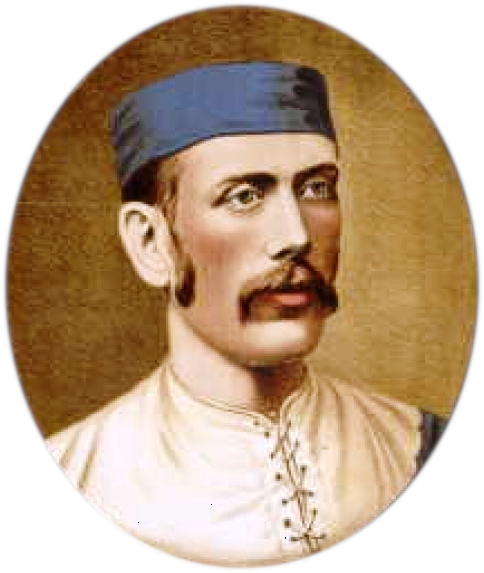
- Coulthard wearing a Carlton Football Club guernsey and cap
- Born: 1 August 1856; Carlton, Victoria, Australia
- Died: 22 October 1883 (aged 27); Carlton, Victoria, Australia
- Resting place: Melbourne General Cemetery, Victoria
- Occupations: Cricketer; Australian rules footballer; tobacconist
- Spouse: Letitia Jackson (m. 1880)
- Children: 2

George Coulthard (1 August 1856 – 22 October 1883) was an Australian cricketer, umpire and Australian rules footballer.

Born and raised on a farm outside Melbourne, Victoria, Coulthard helped lead the Carlton Football Club to premiership success in the fledgling Victorian Football Association (VFA), and was a key member of the Victorian side that dominated the first intercolonial matches. A fast, versatile and highly skilled footballer, Coulthard was, in the opinion of many of his contemporaries, the greatest player yet seen in the Australian game. However, his football career ended in controversy in 1882 when he received a season-long suspension—then the most severe punishment ever handed down by the VFA—for brawling and using "bad language" during play. Regarded today as the game's "first bona fide superstar", he was an inaugural inductee into the Australian Football Hall of Fame.

As a professional cricketer, he played at club level for Melbourne, represented Victoria in five first-class intercolonial matches, and made one Test appearance for Australia, against England in 1882. Coulthard also umpired one of the earliest Tests at age 22, and although he remains the youngest-ever Test umpire, he is perhaps best known in cricket for instigating the sport's first international riot when, in 1879 in Sydney, he controversially gave New South Wales batsman Billy Murdoch out against Lord Harris's English XI. Coulthard was co-officiating the match with Edmund Barton, later the first prime minister of Australia.

Coulthard's sporting exploits made him a household name throughout Australia. Off the field, he ran a tobacco and sporting goods store in Lygon Street, Carlton, and won additional fame for surviving a shark attack off Shark Island, fighting bare-knuckle boxing champion Jem "The Gypsy" Mace, and being the alleged source of a dream premonition that convinced many Melbourne Cup punters to back a horse with long odds (the horse finished close to last). Coulthard is also known as Australian football's first "man in white" for umpiring an 1880 match in the now-traditional all-white uniform. In 1882, while serving as the England cricket team's umpire on its first quest to regain The Ashes, Coulthard became ill with tuberculosis, from which he died the following year, aged 27.

== Football ==
=== Carlton's star recruit ===
George Coulthard
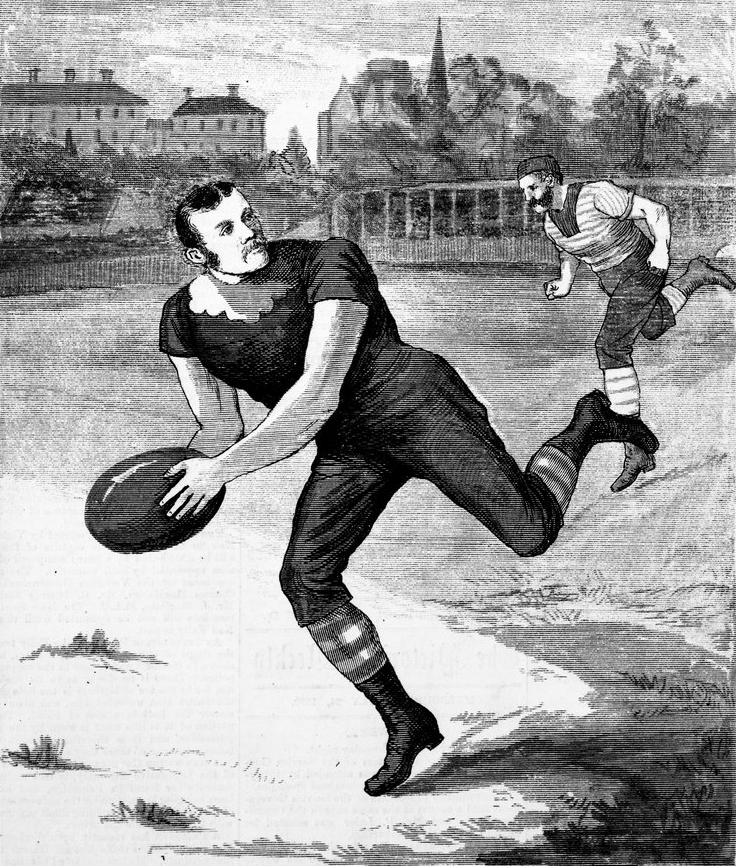
- Coulthard running with the ball against Geelong at the East Melbourne Cricket Ground on 17 July 1880

Personal information
- Original team: North Carlton
- Height: 178 cm (5 ft 10 in)
- Weight: 76 kg (168 lb)

Playing career
Years	Club	Games (Goals)
1874–1875	Carlton Imperial	7 (8)
1876–1882	Carlton	85 (55)
Total		92 (63)

Career highlights
- VFA premiership player: 1877; 3× VFA leading goal-kicker: 1878, 1879, 1880; Australian Football Hall of Fame inductee

Coulthard is believed to have started his football career at Carlton District Football League side, North Cartlon. Coulthard then played for junior league football for Carlton Imperial in the 1874 season, where he remained in 1875 after the Imperials were elevated to Senior status. He proved to be a match-winner for the Imperials with his goal-kicking, and in 1876 was recruited by Carlton, then a powerhouse of Victorian football.

Starting off as one of Carlton's followers, he was described by The Footballer as a "rising and most promising player". Carlton topped the ladder that year and looked to win its fourth premiership in a row, but in a de facto premiership playoff against archrivals Melbourne, a controversial umpiring call secured the trophy for the latter club.

The Victorian Football Association (VFA) was established the following year, with Carlton as one of its twelve foundation member clubs. Despite switching between attacking and defensive positions during the 1877 VFA season, Coulthard still managed to rank equal-first on Carlton's goal-kicking tally with eight goals, and his elusive dashes with the ball in hand, fully 100 metres up the field at times, became a celebrated aspect of his game:

His speciality is, undoubtedly, running with the ball; many are the runs he has made, warding off his opponents with his long, muscular arms. This peculiar style of passing is really a treat to witness, and we may well say that Coulthard is unequalled at it, being a custom almost his own.

— The Australasian

Mid-season, Carlton pioneered intercolonial football in Australia when it travelled north to Sydney in New South Wales to take on the Waratahs, a local rugby club, in two matches: one under rugby rules, the other under Australian rules. As was expected, each club won the match played by its own rules, and Coulthard was appraised as one of two Carlton footballers who adapted best to rugby. The clubs met again in Melbourne, repeating the code switch. Carlton won playing Australian rules and claimed a 1–1 draw in the rugby match in defiance of the opposing team's umpire, who disputed their goal; the Waratahs eventually allowed it under protest in order for the game to continue. Coulthard stood out in both fixtures and briefly joined the Waratahs to play rugby. He quickly dominated at the sport, scoring all five goals and four tries in his second and last game for the club.

Although he appeared in only two of the Waratahs' twelve rugby matches in 1877, Coulthard scored more goals than any other member that season, and tied equal first in tries. Coulthard was remembered decades later for "[showing] the Rugby men how their game should be played".

=== Shark attack ===
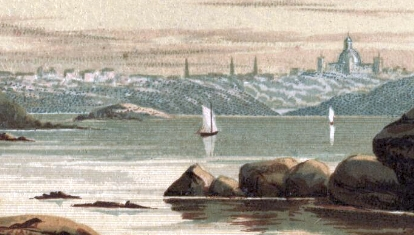
The waters near Shark Island where the shark attack took place.

Following the matches against Carlton, the Waratahs adopted Australian rules, and for a time, the colonial game threatened to become the dominant code in Sydney. During this period, Coulthard accepted an invitation to travel to Sydney to help foster Australian rules. On 15 September 1877, soon after his arrival, Coulthard joined several local footballers on a fishing trip in Sydney Harbour. The group was anchored off Shark Island when Coulthard, sitting on the boat's gunwale with the back of his tailcoat hanging over the side, was pulled overboard by "a monster shark, 13 feet long". The shark had seized his coattails trailing on the water and dragged him beneath the surface "some ten or twelve feet" until it tore the coat from his body. After kicking at the shark, Coulthard swam to the surface alongside the boat, "into which he threw, with the aid of his friends, a kind of somersault, just about as quickly as he had been taken overboard." The incident was said to be "one of the most marvellous escapes from a fearful death on record" and "probably without parallel in Australian waters".

Shaken by the event, Coulthard returned to Melbourne within a week, where he resumed playing for Carlton. The club denied rumours that it had lured its star player back with financial incentives, stating that Coulthard returned due to a falling out with his associates in Sydney. Nonetheless, the shark entered sporting folklore in the 20th century as the reason why Coulthard abandoned his plans in Sydney, which, as the story goes, kept Australian rules from becoming the city's most popular football code.

=== Champion of Victoria ===
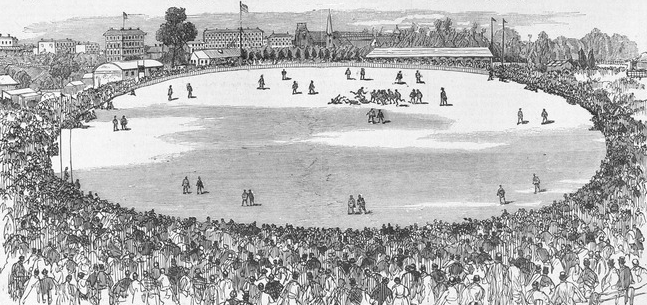
Coulthard was declared best-on-ground in the first intercolonial football match: Victoria v. South Australia, 1879, East Melbourne Cricket Ground.

Back in Victoria, in the lead-up to the final match of 1877, against Melbourne, Carlton was already acknowledged as having won the premiership—its fifth such honour in seven years—based on the results of previous encounters between the two clubs that season. Coulthard was instrumental in maintaining Carlton's supremacy and was voted by The Australasian in its end-of-season review as one of the VFA's best backline players. Carlton was considered the best side early on in the 1878 VFA season with Coulthard putting in best-on-ground efforts for the club. However, 1878 saw provincial Geelong develop a dynasty that would dominate the competition well into the 1880s. Coulthard capped off the season with 18 goals, the most of any player that year, and was singled out for his prowess in the ruck.

Coulthard was Carlton's best in its first match of the 1879 VFA season, a 4–0 win over Albert Park in which he scored a goal after using an innovative dodging tactic that, according to one observer, left his opponents "standing looking on at the cool operation like a lot of demented geese". In July, in Melbourne, Victoria defeated South Australia in the first football contest between two colonies. Coulthard contributed two goals for Victoria in a best-on-ground display, and again led the way when his colony trounced South Australia in the return match a few days later. At the Melbourne Cricket Ground (MCG) the following month, in the first club football match staged at night under electric lights, Carlton triumphed over Melbourne 3–0, two of the goals coming from Coulthard. He ended 1879 with a record 21 goals, seven more than the runner-up. At the conclusion of the season, The Australasian declared:

There can be no two opinions as to who is entitled first mention—George Coulthard, of Carlton. Back, forward, or following, and nowhere out of place, the grandest player of the day, it is doubtful if for general excellence his equal has ever been seen in Victoria.

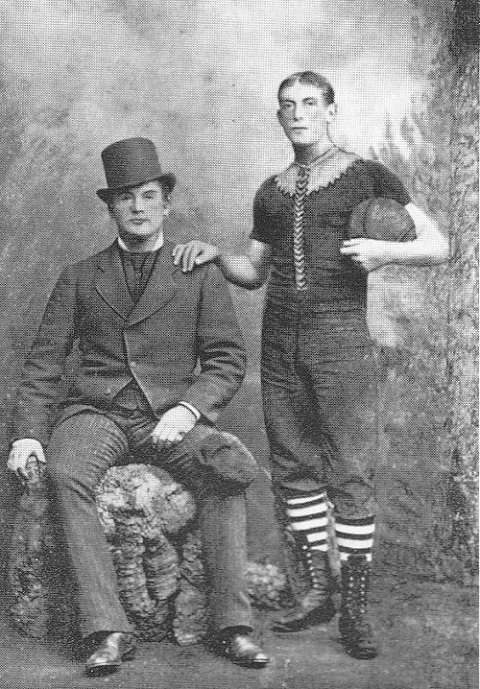
Coulthard (right) wearing a Carlton guernsey and holding a football with club secretary E. A. Prévôt, 1880

Coulthard kicked all five goals in the first game of the 1880 VFA season. Carlton was still undefeated in June when it recorded another victory, against Melbourne, in a testimonial match for Coulthard, who complimented the occasion with a best-on-ground effort. In July, he officiated a match between Melbourne and South Australia's touring Norwood Football Club in the now-traditional all-white umpiring uniform, and is thus recognised as football's first "man in white". Later that month, in a major match against reigning premiers Geelong, Coulthard fainted after opponent George "Hercules" Watson felled and injured him behind play. He tried squaring up to Watson but was pulled back by a police constable and taken from the field to recover. The incident failed to stop Carlton from recording an upset victory, ending Geelong's 44 match winning streak. Coulthard finished on top of the goal-kicking ladder for the third consecutive season with 21 goals, and was again recognised as a champion of the colony.

In July of the 1881 VFA season, Coulthard, attempting a mark in front of Carlton's goal, was tackled by a Melbourne opponent and accidentally kicked behind the right ear. It left a wound that required immediate surgical treatment, forcing him to sit out the match. Coulthard was still suffering the effects of the injury one week later when he returned to the field to face Geelong. He struggled during Carlton's 1881 tour of Adelaide, the local press stating that he was manned so persistently due to his footballing reputation that "he does not get the same chance of showing his sterling qualities". Although not up to his usual standard that year, Coulthard was still acknowledged as one of Victoria's best forwards, and secured 18 majors to finish second in the goal-kicking stakes.

=== Career-ending suspension ===
Coulthard was serving as Carlton's vice-captain in 1882 when events conspired to end his VFA career. During a club training session in April, he clashed with teammate Joey Tankard, a new recruit who subsequently returned to his original club of Hotham. They reignited their feud in August when Carlton and Hotham met on the East Melbourne Cricket Ground. With Carlton leading into the second half, Coulthard fell on Tankard in a scrimmage, either accidentally or on purpose "with both fists shut", depending on the eyewitness account. Upon rising, Tankard struck Coulthard in the face, who returned punches in kind and used "foul language" before other players broke up the fight. The crowd then invaded the pitch and an eruption of mob violence seemed imminent until the police intervened. The Sportsman called it "one of the most disgraceful affairs witnessed on a football field". Later in the match, Coulthard challenged Tankard to a fight in the pavilion, but he refused.

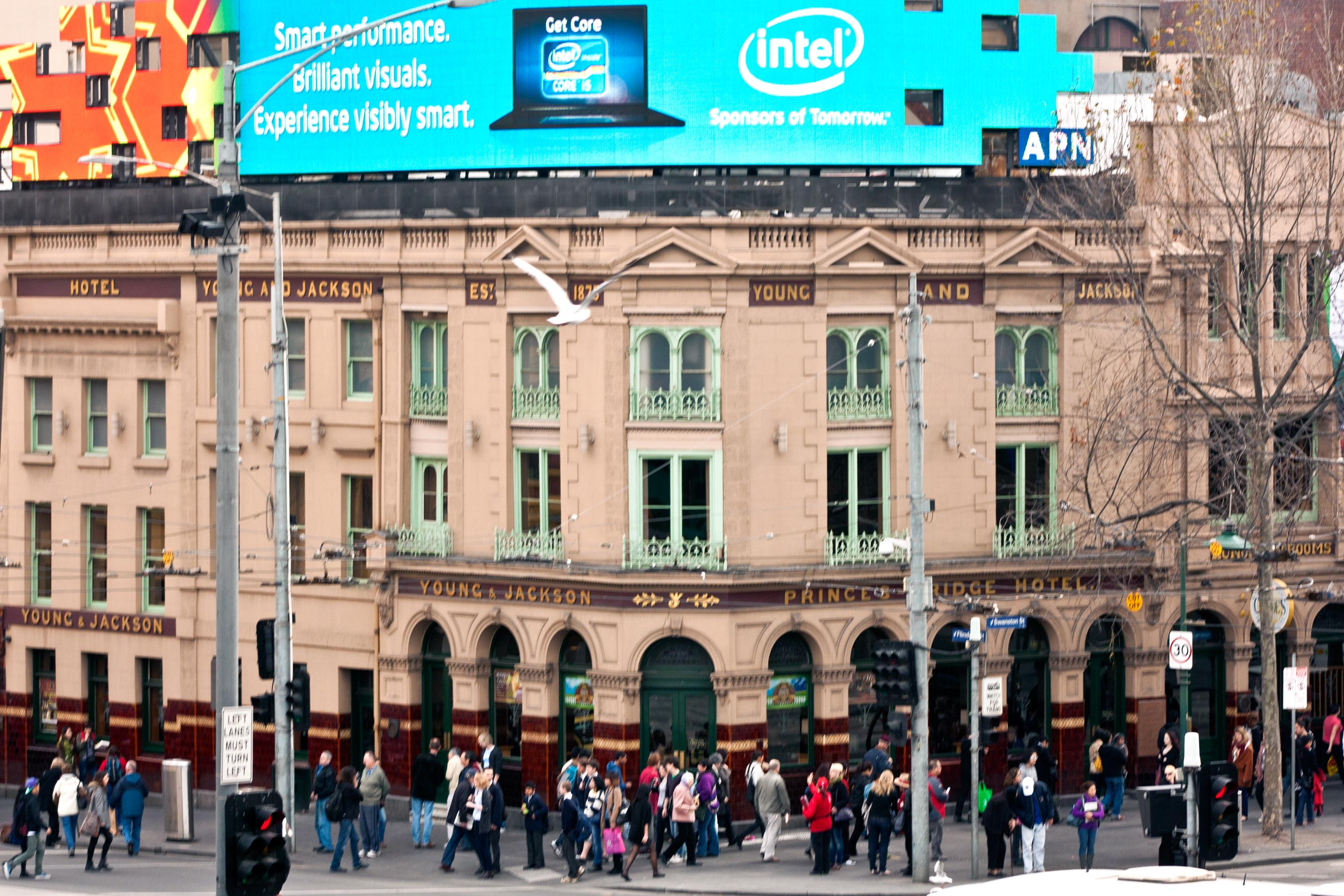
Coulthard received his suspension at the Young & Jackson hotel

Six days later, the VFA held a special meeting at the Young & Jackson hotel regarding the incident. After assessing the evidence, the bulk of which showed Tankard to be the aggressor, the VFA determined that Coulthard was "more to blame" for the fracas, with chairman H. C. A. Harrison expressing the opinion that "bad language is far worse than blows." Both players received a season-long suspension—the first punishment of its kind carried out by the association. After the verdict was handed down, Hotham secretary E. J. Lawrence accused Coulthard of insulting and threatening Tankard outside the meeting, and considered going to the police.

The Coulthard-Tankard affair was seen as the culmination of a recent trend in the sport harking back to the violence and brutality of 1860s football. The Argus supported the VFA, saying "it ought to be thanked and applauded by footballers, as it assuredly is by the public." Other publications considered the sentence too severe on the grounds that no similar charge had previously been brought against Coulthard, and that the VFA had shown leniency in similar, if not worse cases. The incident also served as a fulcrum for debate on the role of the media; one journalist in particular was criticised for sensationalising the fight, and in turn, influencing the VFA's decision to investigate it.

While Hotham abided by the ruling, Carlton was heavily censured for refusing to enter the field in its next arranged match, against Melbourne, unless Coulthard was allowed to play. Melbourne would only accept their demand if Carlton "assumed the responsibility of defying the association". Carlton rejected the offer, and the match was abandoned. By this stage, Carlton was in talks to secede from the VFA, but later decided to play out the season. It still sought to exonerate Coulthard, and at the VFA's next meeting, the case was reconsidered. In a move that quickly turned public opinion against the VFA, Tankard's suspension was uplifted while Coulthard's remained in place. The Australasian accused the VFA of basing its decision on "various jealousies and petty personal interests", and called for the governing body to be completely restructured. It was said that Coulthard's status as a lower class professional sportsman made him a convenient scapegoat. In a review of the Coulthard-Tankard affair, one journalist concluded:

Football may be a fine, muscular game, but football association decisions appear to be child's play, based upon reasoning that would be credit to Yarra Bend.

Coulthard, despite missing five matches due to his suspension, ranked first for Carlton and fourth overall in the 1882 goal-kicking ladder, tallying 14 majors. He never played senior-level football again.

== Cricket ==
George Coulthard
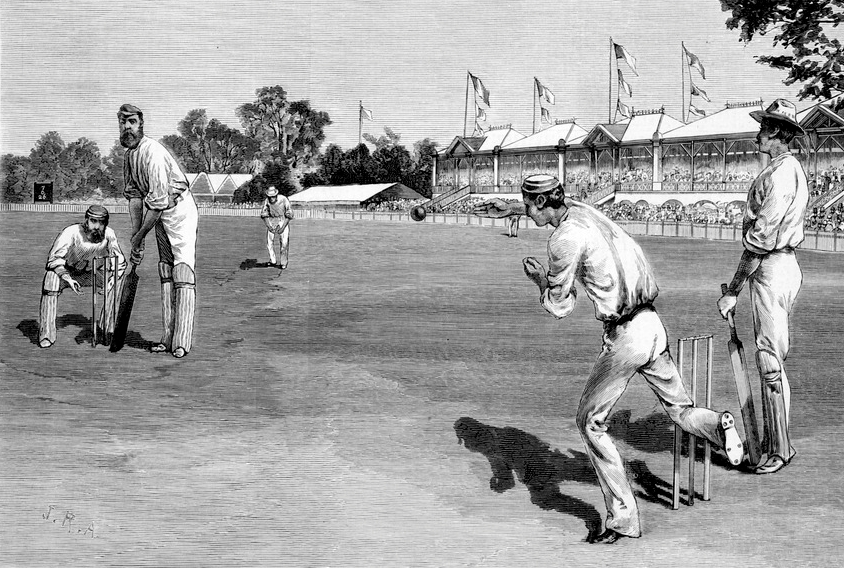
- Australia v. England at the MCG, 1879, in the third-ever Test match, umpired by Coulthard

Cricket information
- Batting: Right-handed
- Bowling: Right arm medium
- Role: All-rounder

International information
- National side: Australia

Domestic team information
- Years: Team
- 1880/81–1881/82: Victoria

Umpiring information
- Tests umpired: 2 (1879–1882)

Career statistics
Competition	Tests	First-class
Matches	1	6
Runs scored	6	92
Batting average	–	11.50
100s/50s	0/0	0/0
Top score	6*	31
Balls bowled	0	332
Wickets	0	5
Bowling average	–	25.00
5 wickets in innings	0	0
10 wickets in match	0	0
Best bowling	–	3/29
Catches/stumpings	0/0	3/0
- Source: Cricinfo

=== Melbourne professional ===
Coulthard began his cricket career at the Carlton Cricket Club. For the 1877–78 season, he transferred to the Melbourne Cricket Club (MCC), which took him on as a professional ground bowler (a job that involved bowling to members in the nets). In 1878–79, he went in as a substitute for a Victorian XV during a match against the first representative Australian team, and batted in the lower order for the MCC when it hosted New Zealand's visiting Canterbury XI.

Coulthard was only twenty-two when Lord Harris, captain of the touring England XI, put him on trial as the team's umpire on the advice of the MCC. Coulthard officiated the team's first match in Melbourne, against a Victorian XV, on Boxing Day 1878, and fulfilled the same duty in the lone Test match of the tour, against Australia, held at the MCG on 2–4 January 1879. Satisfied with Coulthard's umpiring, Harris invited him to accompany the team and stand in as umpire for the remainder of the tour.

=== Sydney Riot of 1879 ===
The England team's next first-class match was against New South Wales on the Association Ground in Sydney. As a hired professional, Coulthard was viewed with suspicion by many Sydneysiders (the local custom was to use amateur umpires), and, in an era of intense rivalry between the colonies, the fact that he was a Victorian only deepened their distrust. They also considered him "a mere tyro", out of depth with his new responsibilities. Even so, New South Wales was tipped to win based on England's losses in Victoria, and illegal gamblers had placed heavy bets in favour of the home side.

The first game passed off without incident, New South Wales winning by five wickets. England fought back in the return match, which began on 7 February. In reply to the tourists' first innings total of 267, Billy Murdoch, the star of New South Wales, carried his bat for 82 out of 177 and had reached 10 in the follow-on when Coulthard gave him run out. The dismissal caused an uproar in the crowd of 10,000, incited, it was alleged, by bookmakers and their cohorts in the pavilion, who told Murdoch to stay on the field. It was not Coulthard's first controversial call; on the first day, he gave the caught Harris a second life, a "blatant error" according to one match reporter.

Ignoring his team's umpire Edmund Barton, who deemed the run out fair, New South Wales captain Dave Gregory threatened to abandon the match unless Harris had Coulthard replaced. While the captains conferred, one of the English fieldsmen inflamed the situation by addressing hecklers in the crowd as "nothing but 'sons of convicts'". At this point, up to 2,000 "roughs and larrikins" surged onto the pitch. Some of the England players armed themselves with stumps as defensive weapons. Harris, in defending Coulthard, was struck with a heavy stick, and A. N. "Monkey" Hornby collared and dragged the assailant to the pavilion, taking punches and nearly losing his shirt in the process. Powerless to restore order, the mounted police were able to rescue Coulthard only after a lengthy struggle and with the help of volunteers. Two attempts were made to resume the match, but when the rioters learned of Harris' refusal to withdraw Coulthard, they again rushed the ground and stayed there until the scheduled end of play. Outside the ground, Coulthard was cornered by a 200-strong mob but escaped without further trouble when a group of sailors intervened and "polished off" his would-be attackers.

Following a joint apology from New South Wales cricket officials, Harris agreed to continue the match after Sunday break on the condition that Coulthard stood in as umpire. England won by an innings and 41 runs, and then cancelled its remaining fixtures in Sydney. The riot was reported on widely as a national disgrace and a blow to Anglo-Australian relations. The Sydney press maintained that Coulthard was either incompetent or "wilfully corrupt" as umpire. He wrote an open letter to The Sydney Evening News denying accusations that he had bets on the match, and Harris stated publicly that had he suspected his umpire of taking any interest in the result, he would not have employed him.

Speaking at a banquet given to the England team in Melbourne at the end of the tour, Lord Harris reaffirmed his belief that Murdoch was correctly given out, and, to the applause of the audience, stated that he and his men "had met with no better or fairer umpire than Mr. Coulthard".

=== First-class and Test careers ===
Coulthard was brought into a Victoria XV in March 1880 to take on that season's Australian representative team. He was the leading wicket-taker for his side with 5/52 and 4/28. In his first-class debut for Victoria later that year, against South Australia on the East Melbourne Cricket Ground, he took 3/29 and contributed 31 runs to a first innings total of 329, but his performance with the leather slumped in the second innings, conceding 49 runs for a single wicket. The following month, after top scoring (51) for a Victorian XV in a match against the Australian XI, Coulthard played in his first of three first-class contests against New South Wales. He failed to make much of a statistical impact for Victoria in any of these intercolonials.

Given the inconsistency of his first-class outings, it is considered an oddity that, during the 1881–82 season, Coulthard, then Victoria's twelfth man, was selected to play for Australia against Alfred Shaw's touring England team following the withdrawal through injury of Alick Bannerman and Fred Spofforth. It was the second Test of the tour, held at the Association Ground in Sydney on 17–21 February. Batting at number eleven, he scored 6 not out in a useful last wicket stand of 29 with fellow Test debutant Sammy Jones. It would be Coulthard's solitary Test appearance, earning him the rare distinction shared only with fellow Australian Paddy McShane of playing in a Test after umpiring in one. Also, by a "twist of fate", his captain in the match was Billy Murdoch. Coulthard umpired the fourth and final Test of the tour at the MCG on 10–14 March.

== Other sports ==
Beyond cricket and football, Coulthard excelled at other sports, and he was remembered as "one of the best all-round sportsmen of all time".

An admired amateur boxer, he sparred with—and competed against—English bare-knuckle champion Jem "The Gypsy" Mace.

== Family and personal life ==
Coulthard was born on 1 August 1856 in Boroondara (near Kew) to Thomas Coulthard and his wife Elizabeth (née Fleming), both of whom migrated to Victoria from England in 1854. Born in 1811 outside Stanhope, Thomas, a lead ore miner, married in 1843 to Elizabeth, an Ireshopeburn native two years his junior. George was their seventh child. Thomas and Elizabeth died in 1866 and 1873, respectively.

Coulthard was educated at St. Matthew's School, Carlton. As an adult, he lived in Carlton's Lygon Street, where he ran a sporting goods store that doubled as a clubroom and smoking divan. He married a woman named Letitia Ann Jackson in July 1880 with whom he had two daughters, one of whom died in infancy.

In March 1879, Coulthard spied on and captured William Grieves, a notorious criminal who had eluded detection for five years, and delivered him into police custody. Coulthard was later reportedly admitted as a member of the Victoria detective force. Coulthard also donated a koala to the precursor of the Melbourne Zoo in 1880.

Coulthard's youngest brother, William, the only sibling to survive past the age of 30, lived until 1935 and served on the board of the Carlton Football Club. He named his son after George.

== Illness and death ==
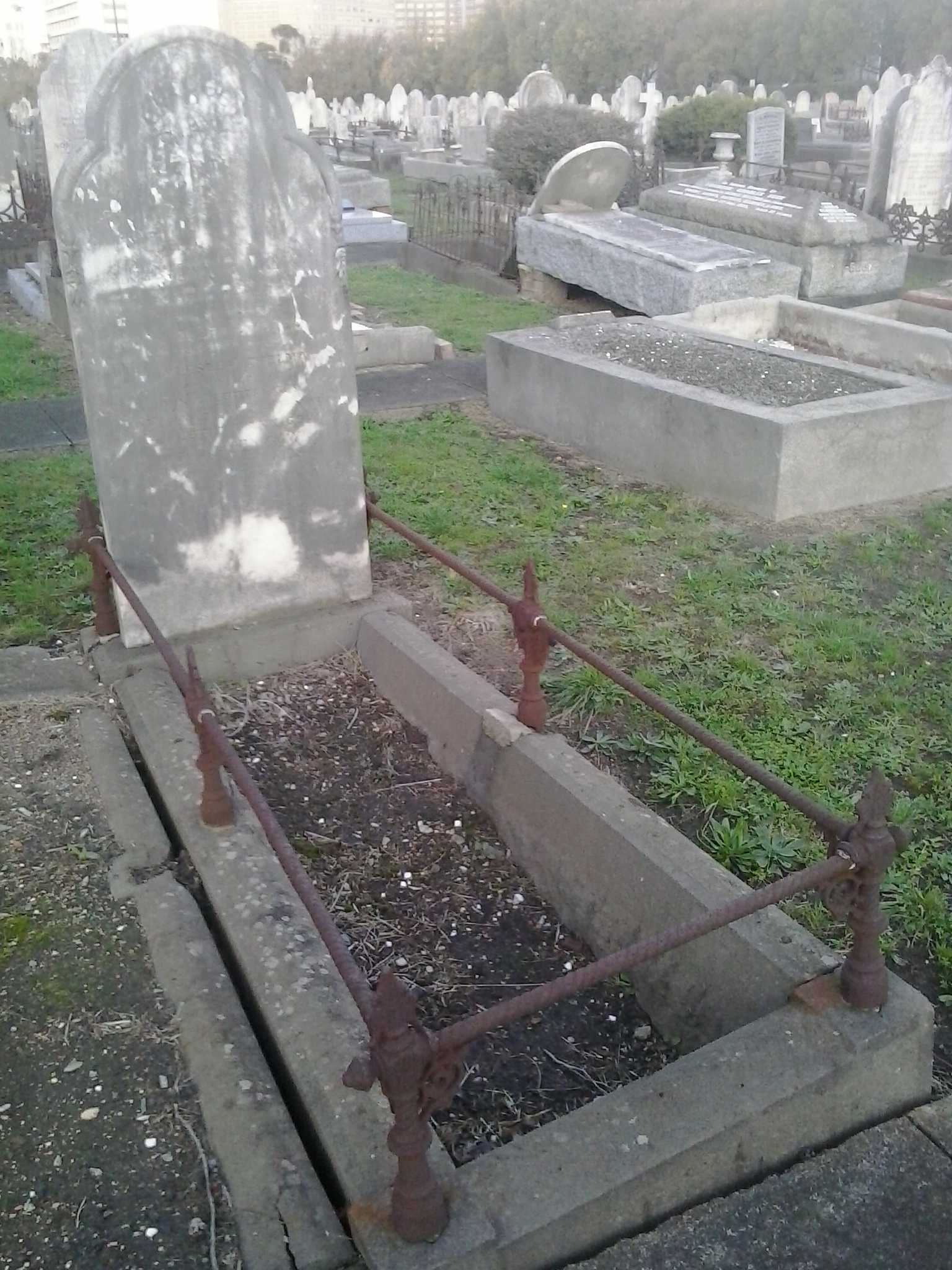
Coulthard's gravesite, Melbourne General Cemetery

In November 1882, Coulthard was appointed umpire for Ivo Bligh's touring England XI on its famous quest to recover The Ashes. Coulthard fell ill during a sea voyage early on in the tour, and on the second day of a match in Newcastle, suffered "severe indisposition" and retired from his post. Coulthard had contracted tuberculosis, and he was feared to be on the verge of death by the start of the 1883 VFA season. It was arranged that all proceeds from a June match between Carlton and Melbourne on the MCG be donated to Coulthard. The Melbourne press, noting Coulthard's popularity, anticipated a record attendance for football in Australia. However, stormy weather kept the turnout to no more than 5,000. Hotham, the club with which Coulthard had feuded the previous year, was among the contributors to his fund.

On 20 October 1883, Coulthard was reportedly "confined to his bed in a dangerous state". Delirious as he succumbed to the disease, Coulthard made apparent references to his suspension from the VFA, saying: "It is not true they're going to disqualify me. Surely they won't disqualify me." News of his death at 223 Lygon Street in Carlton, Victoria on 22 October was met with an outpouring of public grief, and a large procession followed Coulthard's remains from his Lygon Street home to his funeral. He was buried at the Melbourne General Cemetery next to Princes Park, home of the Carlton Football Club.

One sportswriter closed his obituary to Coulthard with the following words:

In all my experience I never met with one who better deserved to have written for epitaph "He was a man."

A benefit concert was staged later that year in Carlton for Coulthard's surviving wife and daughter. On the night of the event, Melbourne identity Edmund Finn recited to the packed venue an original poem about Coulthard, which read in part:

The foremost he, for football's manly game,
Was ever linked with poor George Coulthard's name.
He never changed—to Carlton always true,
He donned thro' good and ill the same dark blue.

=== "The Dream" ===
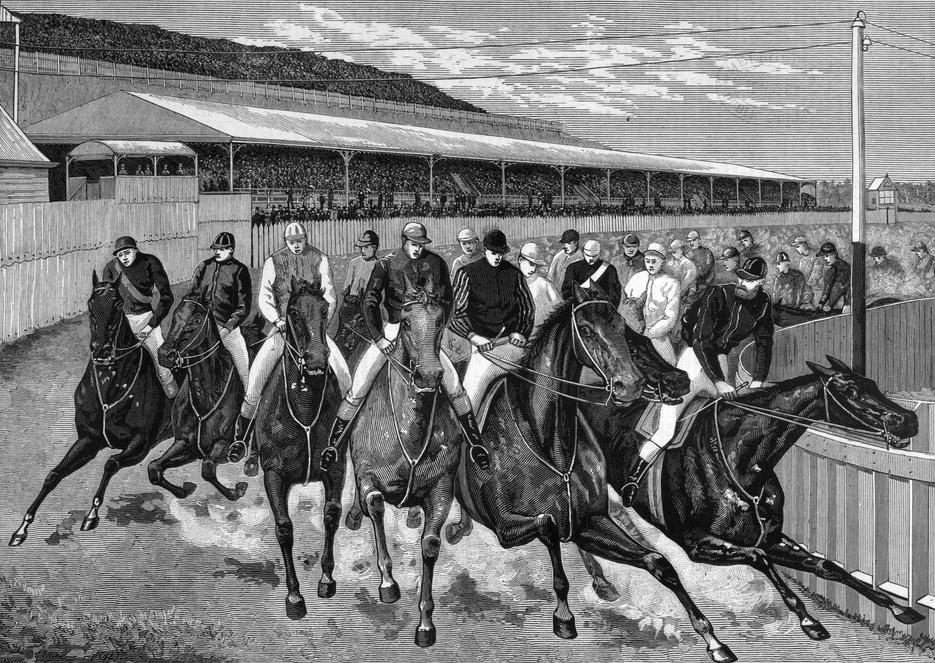
The 1883 Melbourne Cup

Coulthard earned a place in the annals of Australian horse racing for a dream he reportedly had in the weeks before his death. The story went that Coulthard, lying on his deathbed, dreamt that Martini-Henry would win the Victoria Derby, Dirk Hatteraick the Melbourne Cup, and that he himself would die before the first-named race was run. Coulthard's dream was "the great topic of the day" and received significant media coverage. When he died before Martini-Henry won the Derby, a "rush of superstitious punters" placed bets on Dirk Hatteraick to win the Cup, causing a sharp drop in odds, despite the fact that, in the words of one turf writer, the horse was "as fat as a bacon hog". Dirk Hatteraick finished in the tail end of the field. A former member of Victorian Parliament was among those who believed in Coulthard's dream, but admitted backing Dirk Hatteraick "was an idiotic thing to do".

Author Douglas Sladen's short story "At the Melbourne Cup", published by Arthur Patchett Martin in Oak-Bough and Wattle-Blossom: Stories and Sketches by Australians in England (1888), follows a punter who bets on Dirk Hatteraick after learning of Coulthard's dream.

== Legacy ==
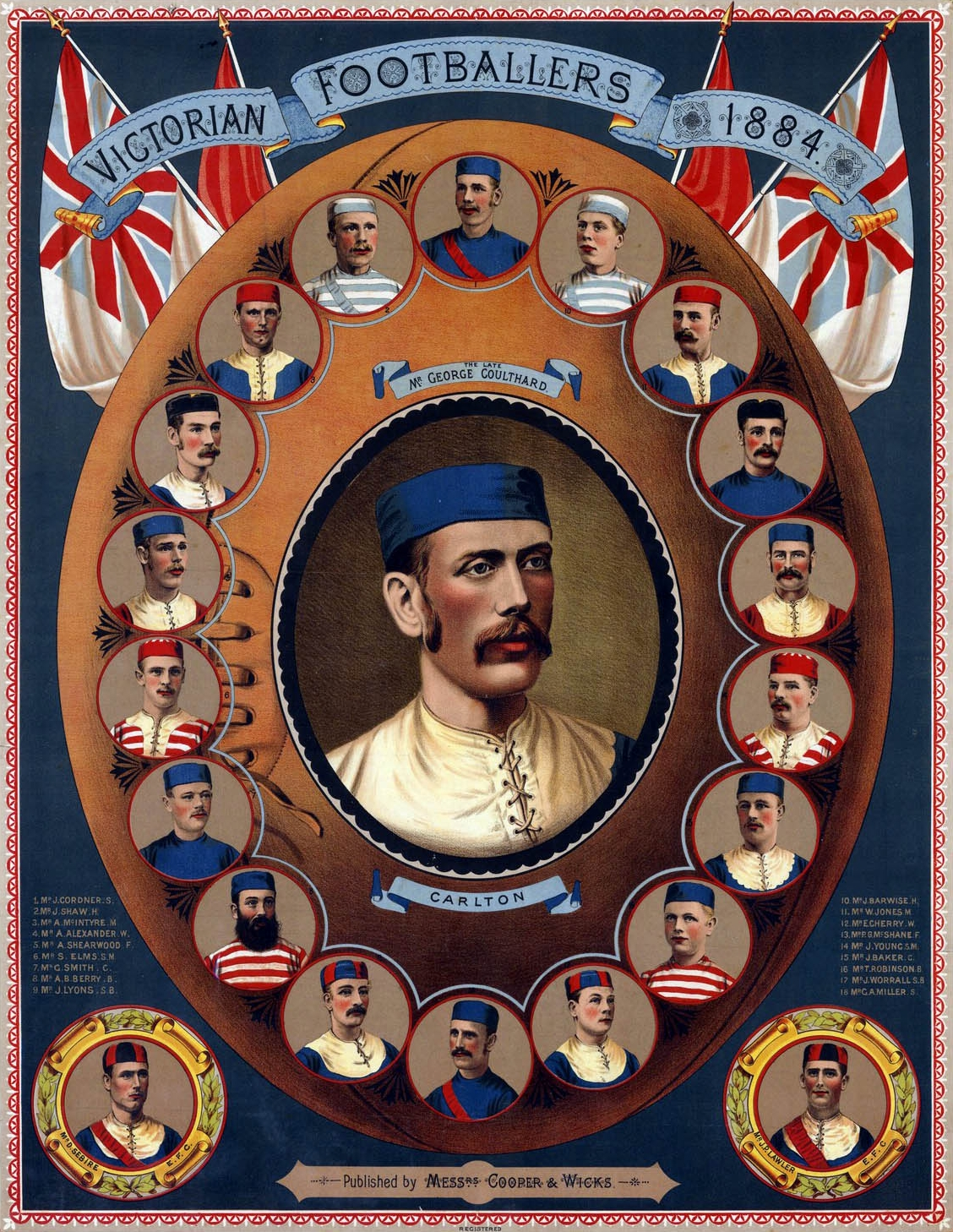
An 1884 poster showing star VFA footballers of the day. Coulthard's central portrait is surrounded by two players from each club, all contained in an oval football.

Coulthard is often ranked alongside Jack Worrall, Albert Thurgood and Fred McGinis as one of the greatest Australian rules footballers to emerge in the first fifty years of the game. In 1908, the year of Australian rules football's jubilee celebrations, sports journalist Donald Macdonald wrote of Coulthard:

He could not be misplaced. His clever handling, his pace, his expertness in dodging, his sureness in the air, and his masterful kicking were items that proved invaluable to his team. He was the brightest star in the galaxy, such as does not, even to-day, shed its effulgent beams on Carlton.

Early football historian C. C. Mullen retrospectively named Coulthard the "Champion of the Colony" for the years 1876, 1877 and 1879. Coulthard was inducted into the Carlton Football Club Hall of fame in 1990, and is one of the few players of his generation to be a member of the Australian Football Hall of Fame.

Coulthard is depicted in the MCG Tapestry, designed by artist Robert Ingpen and unveiled at the MCG in 2003 to commemorate the ground's 150th anniversary.

Coulthard was named as a follower in historian Mark Pennings' "Team of the Nineteenth Century", published in the fifth and final volume of his Origins of Australian Football series (2016). Pennings writes that Coulthard's innate athleticism and diverse skill set made him the ideal follower and "the player that other teams had to stop".

== See also ==
- Australian Football Hall of Fame
- List of Australian rules footballers and cricketers
- List of Australia Test cricketers
- List of Test cricket umpires
- List of Victoria first-class cricketers

== Bibliography ==
Books

- Birley, Derek (2013). A Social History of English Cricket. Aurum Press. ISBN 9781845137502.
- Blainey, Geoffrey (2003). A Game of Our Own: The Origins of Australian Football. Black Inc. ISBN 978-1-86395-347-4.
- Bolfo, Tony De (2009). Out of the Blue: Defining Moments of the Carlton Football Club. Weston Media & Communications. ISBN 978-0-646-51645-5.
- Bolton, Geoffrey (2001). "A Cricket Riot in Sydney, 1879". In Headon, David John (ed.). The Best Ever Australian Sports Writing: A 200 Year Collection. Black Inc. pp. 39–46. ISBN 9781863952668.
- Clowes, Colin (2007). 150 Years of NSW First-class Cricket: A Chronology. Allen & Unwin. ISBN 9781741750829.
- Dunstan, Keith (1998). The Paddock that Grew: The Story of the Melbourne Cricket Club. Random House Australia. ISBN 9780091691707.
- Gelder, Ken; Weaver, Rachael, eds. (2011). The Anthology of Colonial Australian Adventure Fiction. Melbourne University Publishing. ISBN 9780522858617.
- Hess, Rob; Stewart, Bob (1998). More Than a Game: The Real Story of Australian Rules Football. Melbourne University Publishing. ISBN 9780522847727.
- Field, Hugh (2003) [1957]. 100 Years of Football: The Story of the Melbourne Football Club, 1858–1958. Wilke & Co. Ltd.
- Hess, Rob (2008). A National Game: The History of Australian Rules Football. Viking. ISBN 978-0-670-07089-3.
- Lazenby, John (2015). The Strangers Who Came Home: The First Australian Cricket Tour of England. Bloomsbury Publishing. ISBN 9781408842881.
- Richards, Huw (2011). A Game for Hooligans: The History of Rugby Union. Random House. ISBN 9781780573281.
- Weston, James (2008). The Australian Game of Football: Since 1858. Geoff Slattery Publishing. ISBN 978-0-9803466-6-4.
- Pennings, Mark (2012). Origins of Australian Football: Victoria's Early History: Volume 1: Amateur Heroes and the Rise of Clubs, 1858 to 1876. Connor Court Publishing Pty Ltd. ISBN 9781921421471.
- Pennings, Mark (2014). Origins of Australian Football: Victoria's Early History: Volume 2: A Golden Era Begins: Football in 'Marvellous Melbourne', 1877 to 1885. Grumpy Monks Publishing. ISBN 9780646918655.
- Piesse, Ken (1995). The Complete Guide to Australian Football. Pan Macmillan Australia. ISBN 9780330357128.
- Tibballs, Geoff (2004). Great Sporting Scandals. Robson. ISBN 9781861056863.
- Williams, Ken (2000). For Club and Country. Melbourne Cricket Club Library. ISBN 9780957807402.

Journals

- Pennings, Mark (2013). "Fuschias, Pivots, Same Olds and Gorillas: The Early Years of Football in Victoria" (PDF). Tablet to Scoreboard. 1 (1).

Webpages

- Cardosi, Adam (2014). "Neglected heroes: The sad case of the Australian Football Hall of Fame". Australian Football.
