= William Bushby =

Australian rules footballer

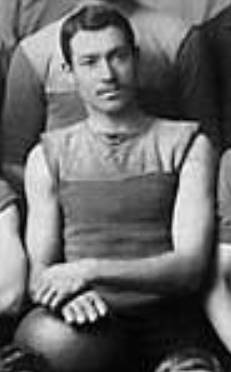

Personal information
- Full name: William Bushby
- Nickname: Bill
- Born: 25 January 1864; South Australia
- Died: 14 April 1936 (aged 72); Prospect, South Australia
- Position: Centerman

Playing career
Years	Club	Games (Goals)
1882	Victorian Football Club (SAFA)	Goals 1
1883–1891	Port Adelaide	Games 108
1886	South Melbourne (VFA)	Games 5
1892–93	South Adelaide	

Career highlights
- 2× Port Adelaide premiership player (1884, 1890); Port Adelaide best & fairest (1887); 2× South Adelaide premiership player (1892, 1893)

William Bushby (25 January 1864 – 14 April 1936) was an Australian rules footballer for Victorian, Port Adelaide, South Adelaide Football Clubs in the SAFA, and briefly for South Melbourne in the VFA. He was also a strong swimmer and member of the South Australia swimming and water polo club.

== Football career ==
Bushby was a big-bodied attacking centreman, adept at playing through the half-forwards with his size. In 1882 he began his senior career with the Victorians Football Club (SAFA) which based at North Adelaide. Then he went to Port Adelaide in 1883, playing there for eight seasons. Bushby was a member of their 1884 and 1890 SAFA premiership-winning teams, and was captain of the club from 1886 to 1889.

In 1886, Bushby left Adelaide shortly before the end of the 1886 SAFA season, and travelled to Melbourne to play for the South Melbourne Football Club for its last five matches of the 1886 VFA season – and, in particular, to play in the 4 September match against undefeated Geelong, a match near certain to have decided the VFA premiership for the season. It is thought to be the first case of a crack South Australian player being recruited by a Victorian club, and was controversial. Although Bushby played some good matches for South Melbourne, he played so poorly in the 4 September match that his failures were still recounted decades later in Victoria: he won few if any possessions, and his direct opponent, Geelong captain David Hickinbotham, was the best player on the ground in Geelong's dominant four goals to one victory. It was not Bushby's only connection to Victorian football, the Fitzroy Football Club accused of making him a big money offer to transfer in 1892.

In 1892, Bushby transferred to South Adelaide, and played there for two seasons. He was vice captain of the 1892 Premiership team under Jack "Dinny" Reedman.

== Swimming ==
In 1883, Busby placed 2nd in a South Australia Colony Championship mile swimming race held on Torrens River Lake in Adelaide. He also competed in events held at the Adelaide City Baths and in 1885 competed against Arthur Thomas Kenney, a Victorian and former amateur world swimming champion and record holder, in a 1000-yard race (30 laps).

== Later years and death ==
In his later years, Bushby continued to be actively involved with swimming, and was the founder of the Lyric Ladies Swimming Club at Kirkcaldy Beach (Henley Beach) in 1912. He was the swimming instructor for this club and at the Adelaide City Baths until 1932. He was also one of the founders of the South Australia Amateur Swimming Association, of which he was a life member.

On the morning of the 14th April 1936, he left his home in Prospect to go for a walk, and was suddenly overcome by a heart seizure.
