= Shark Island (Port Jackson) =

Australian island

Coordinates: 33°51′30.08″S 151°15′27.50″E

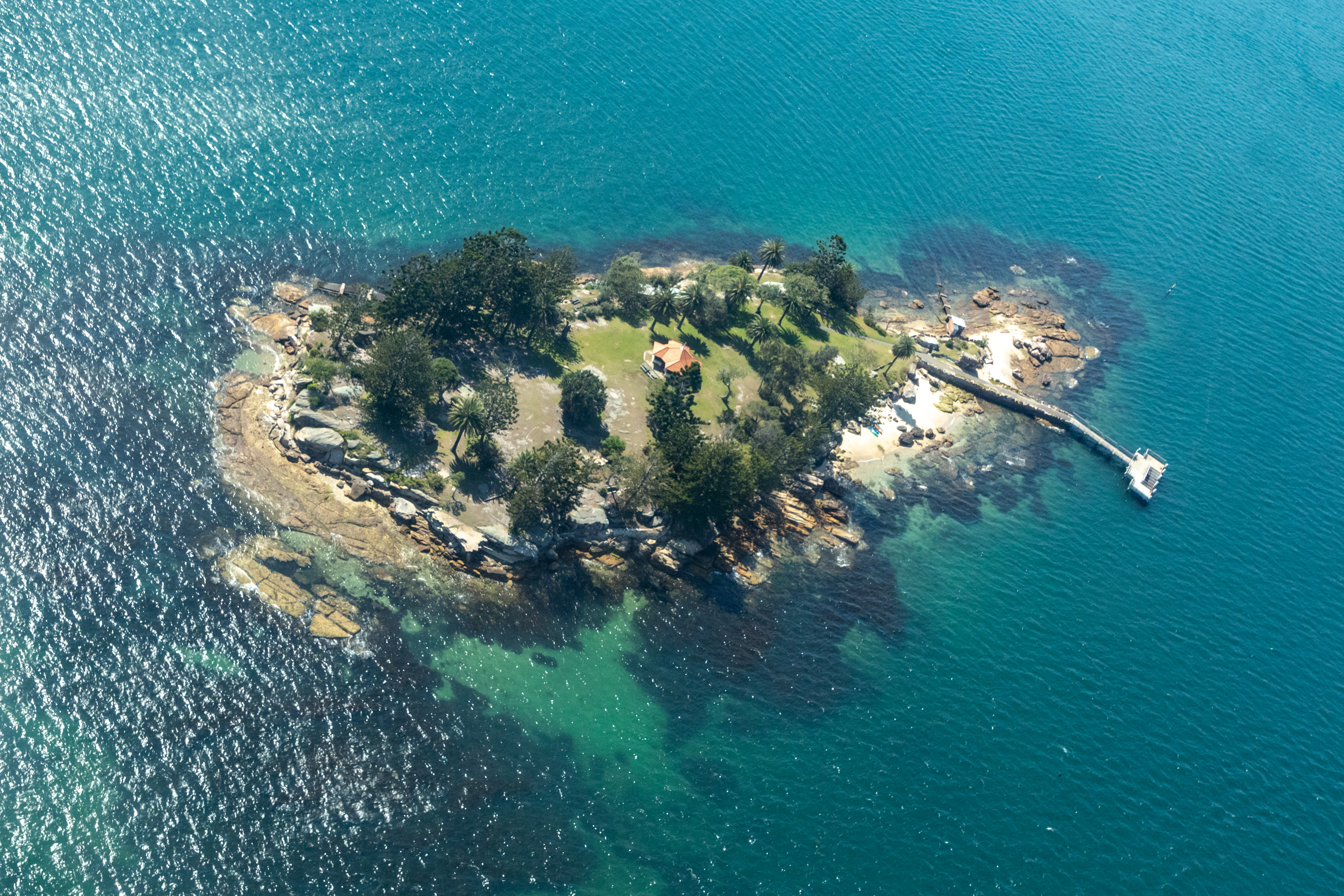
Shark Island

Shark Island is an island located within Sydney Harbour, in New South Wales, Australia. The island is 1.5 hectares (3.7 acres) in area, measuring some 250 metres by 100 metres, and lies off the Sydney suburbs of Point Piper, Rose Bay and Vaucluse, in the eastern section of the harbour between the Harbour Bridge and the harbour entrance. The island was known by the local Aboriginal people as Boambilly, and the current name comes from its shape, which is claimed to resemble a shark. Shark Island Light is an active pile lighthouse located just north of Shark Island. Its light is only visible from within the harbour's fairway between Shark Point and Point Piper.

== History ==
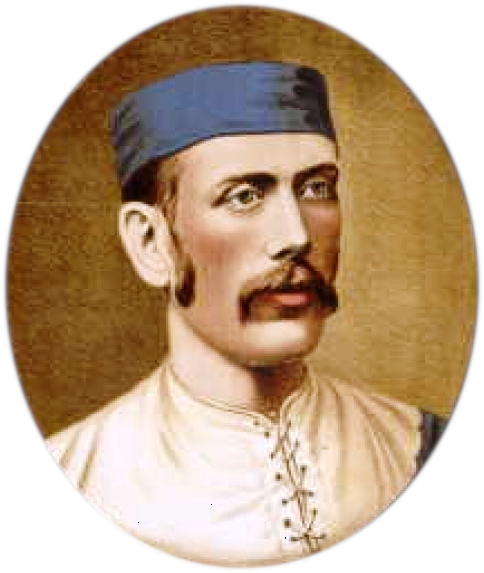
Cricketer and Australian rules footballer George Coulthard was attacked by a shark off Shark Island in 1877.

The island has been the site of drownings, shipwrecks, and at least one shark attack. In 1877, Australian rules footballer and cricketer George Coulthard, while sitting in a boat anchored offshore, was pulled overboard by a large shark. Coulthard managed to return to the boat, and his attack and escape were widely reported.

Parts of the island were set aside as a recreation reserve as early as 1879. It was also used as an animal quarantine station and naval depot until 1975. At that time it became exclusively a recreation reserve and part of the Sydney Harbour National Park. Approved operators and a scheduled ferry service can take people to the island.

Archaeologist Mary Harfield was born on the island.

Elias C. Laycock was custodian of the Shark Island Quarantine Station during the late 1870s and 1880s. He was also Champion Australian sculler.

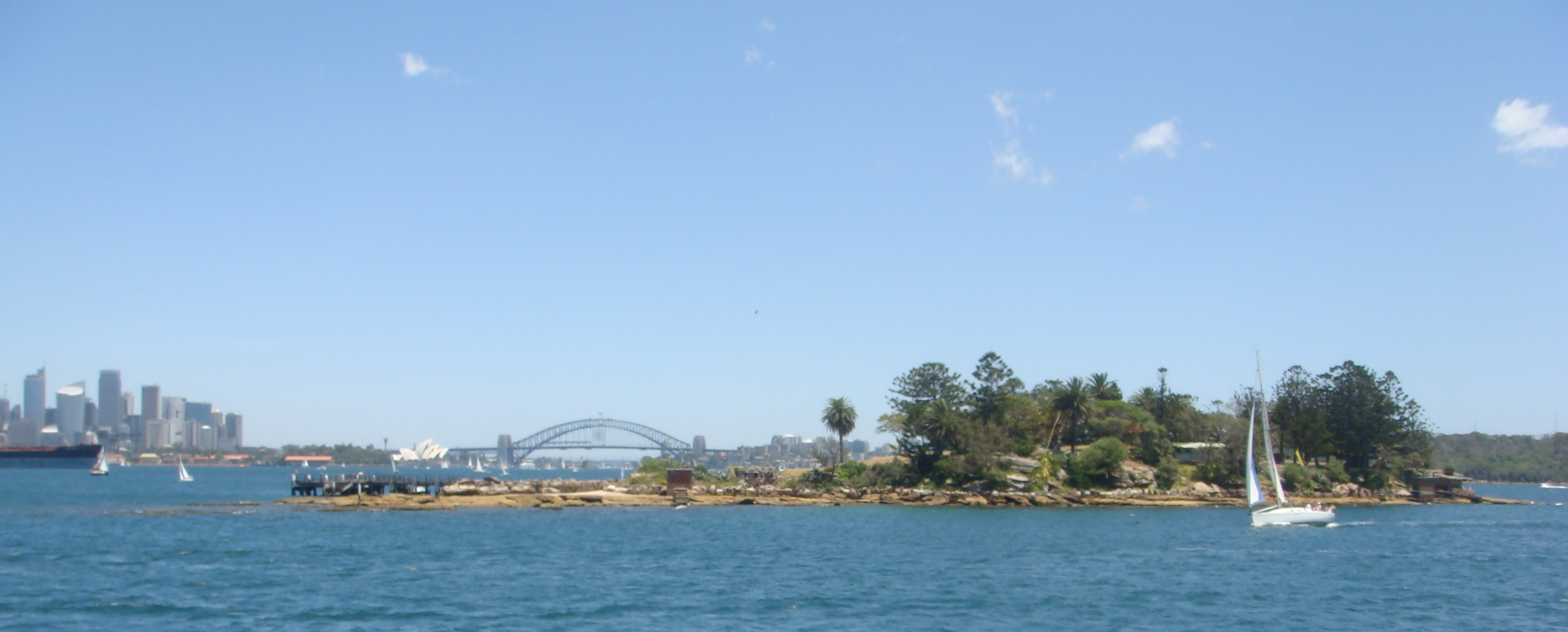
Shown within Sydney Harbour

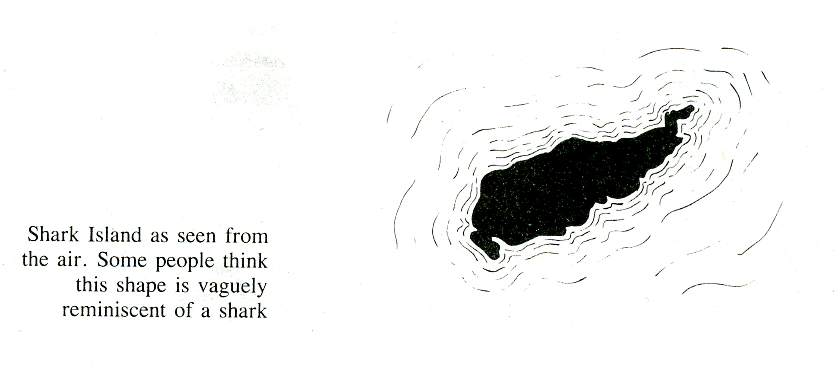
Illustration

== See also ==
- Bradleys Head
- Clark Island (New South Wales)
- Dobroyd Head
- Goat Island
- Sow and Pigs Reef
- Sydney Heads
- Sydney Harbour National Park
