= Joey Tankard =

Australian rules footballer

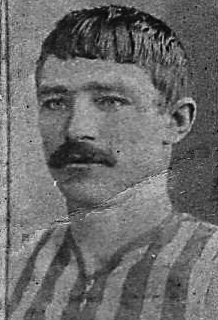

Personal information
- Full name: Joseph Tankard
- Born: 1862
- Died: 18 December 1931 (aged 68–69); Melbourne, Victoria, Australia

Playing career^{1}
Years	Club	Games (Goals)
- Hotham
- Carlton
- Launceston
- ^{1} Playing statistics correct to the end of 1901.

Joseph Tankard (1862 – 18 December 1931) was an Australian rules footballer who played for the Hotham Football Club (now North Melbourne) in the Victorian Football Association (VFA). He infamously came to blows with Carlton's star player, George Coulthard, during a match in 1882. Both players received a season-long suspension for the fight but Tankard was later let off after the VFA reconsidered the case.

He moved to Tasmania in 1890 where he played for colony's representative team. A small, strong follower with abnormally long arms and a tremendous leap, Tankard was considered a pioneer of the high mark, and had "the reputation of being able to fight like a bag of Kilkenny cats". He also played club-level cricket, principally as a wicket-keeper.

== Originator of the finger-tip mark ==
Tankard was known for high marking and was sometimes referred to as a pioneer of the feat. Years after his retirement, Tankard, in a public letter to The Referee, claimed to be the originator of the finger-tip mark in an era when most players marked the ball on the chest. He signed the letter "Ex-Champion Footballer of Victoria". The publication's football writer, a former teammate of Tankard's, disagreed, saying the finger-tip mark was commonplace at the time. He wrote that Tankard "was, however, a fine player, not brilliant, but very serviceable to his side."

== Personal life ==
Tankard worked as a bricklayer and later ran a pub, "appropriately enough, in view of his name", wrote one journalist. He also lived as a swagman for a time.

Tankard suffered a stroke in 1931 and died a few days later, on 18 December. His wife pre-deceased him by one week.

=== Arrests and convictions ===
Tankard was arrested and fined in September 1885 for fighting in Royal Park. In September of the following year, Tankard was arrested and incarcerated along with four other young men for committing an "outrage" in Royal Park, on a woman named Mary Ann Shields. Tankard's involvement caused a stir in the football world. Shields disappeared shortly after the arrests, and was still missing by the time the case went to court. Without the prosecutrix, the five accused were discharged, receiving a serious reprimand from the chairman, who said their conduct was "a disgrace to the colony" and that he had "never seen such a horrible and degrading case" previously brought before him over twenty-five years on the bench. In October 1887, Hugh Wilson, Mayor of North Melbourne, reported Tankard to the police for drunken brawling in public. Tankard was fined and spent 14 days in gaol.
