= Clark Island, New South Wales =

Island in New South Wales, Australia

Coordinates: 33°51′46″S 151°14′28″E

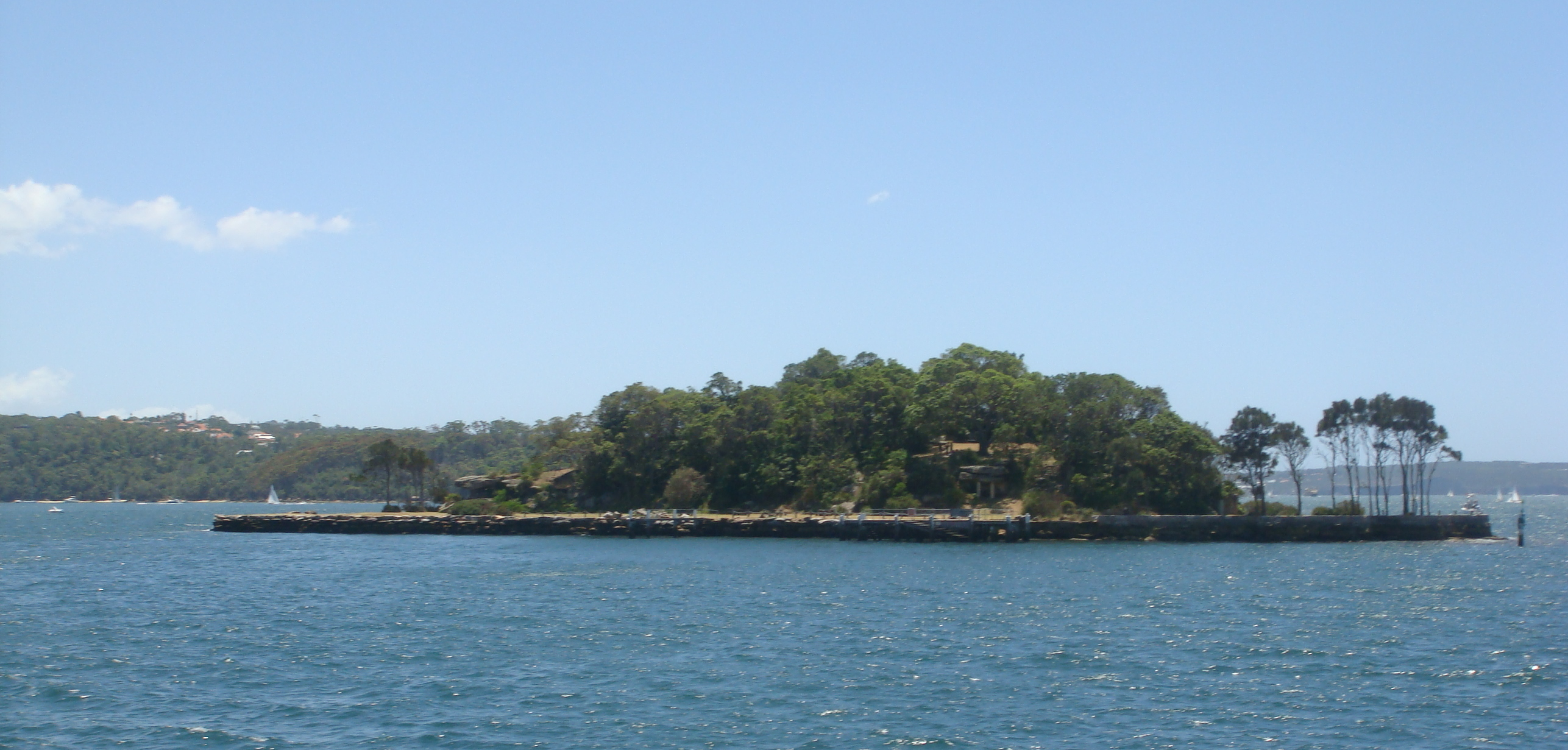
Clark Island lies in Sydney Harbour, and is situated offshore of Darling Point.

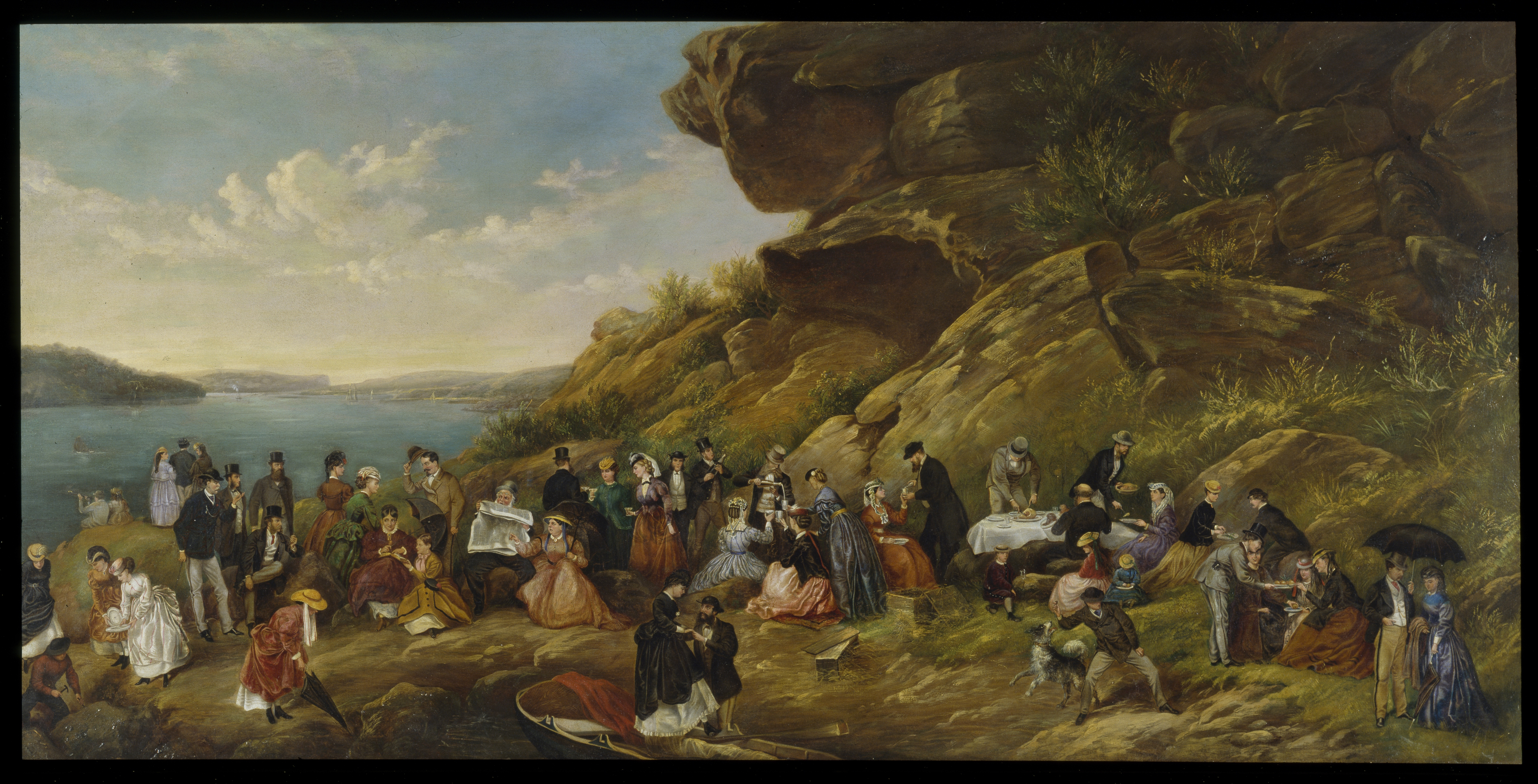
"A days picnic on Clark Island Sydney Harbour 1870" Montagu Scott

Clark Island is a small island in Sydney Harbour, near the coast of New South Wales, Australia. The island is part of the Sydney Harbour National Park and lies offshore the Sydney suburb of Darling Point, in the eastern part of Sydney Harbour between the Harbour Bridge and the harbour entrance.

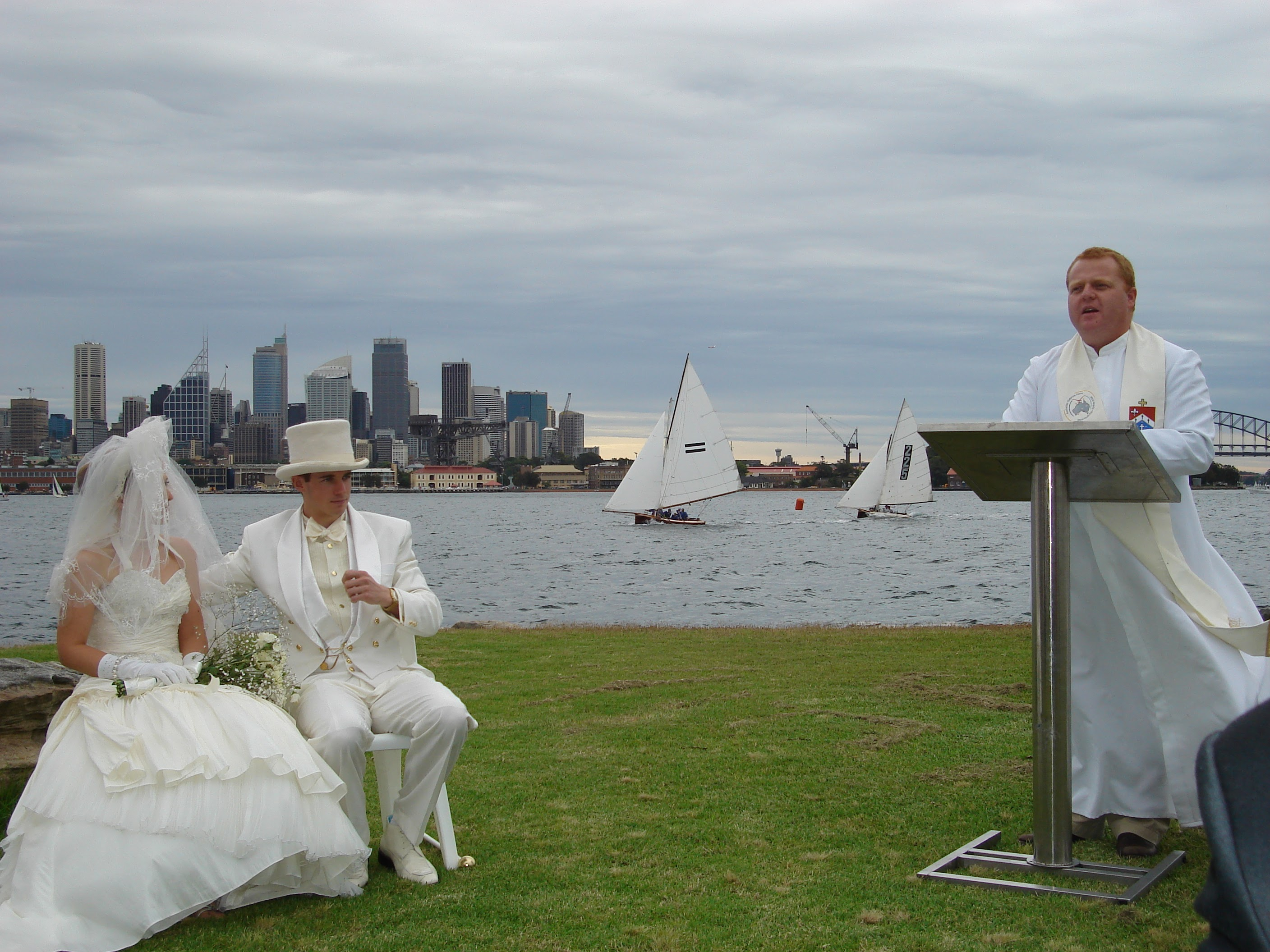
Weddings are held on Clark Island with guests arriving by boat.

== History and description ==
Clark Island is 0.9 hectares in area. Although the island is uninhabited, facilities include picnic tables, toilets, and drinking water. No ferry services operate to the island.

The island derives its name from Lieutenant Ralph Clark, an officer of the First Fleet. In the early days of New South Wales, naval officers were allowed to keep their own vegetable gardens, which were tended by convicts. Clark established one such garden on the island, which was unsuccessful as any produce was soon stolen as a result of the limited rations available at the time. In February 1790, Clark noted that "some Boat had landed since I had been there last and taken away the greatest part ... it is impossible for any body to attempt to raise any Garden stuff here, before it comes to perfection they will steal it.

In January 1979 a theatrical version of Robert Louis Stevenson's Treasure Island was performed on the island by the Nimrod Theatre Company as part of the Sydney Festival.

== See also ==
- Shark Island
- Bradleys Head
- Dobroyd Head
- Middle Head
- Nielsen Park
- Sydney Heads
