= Shark Island Light =

Lighthouse in New South Wales, Australia

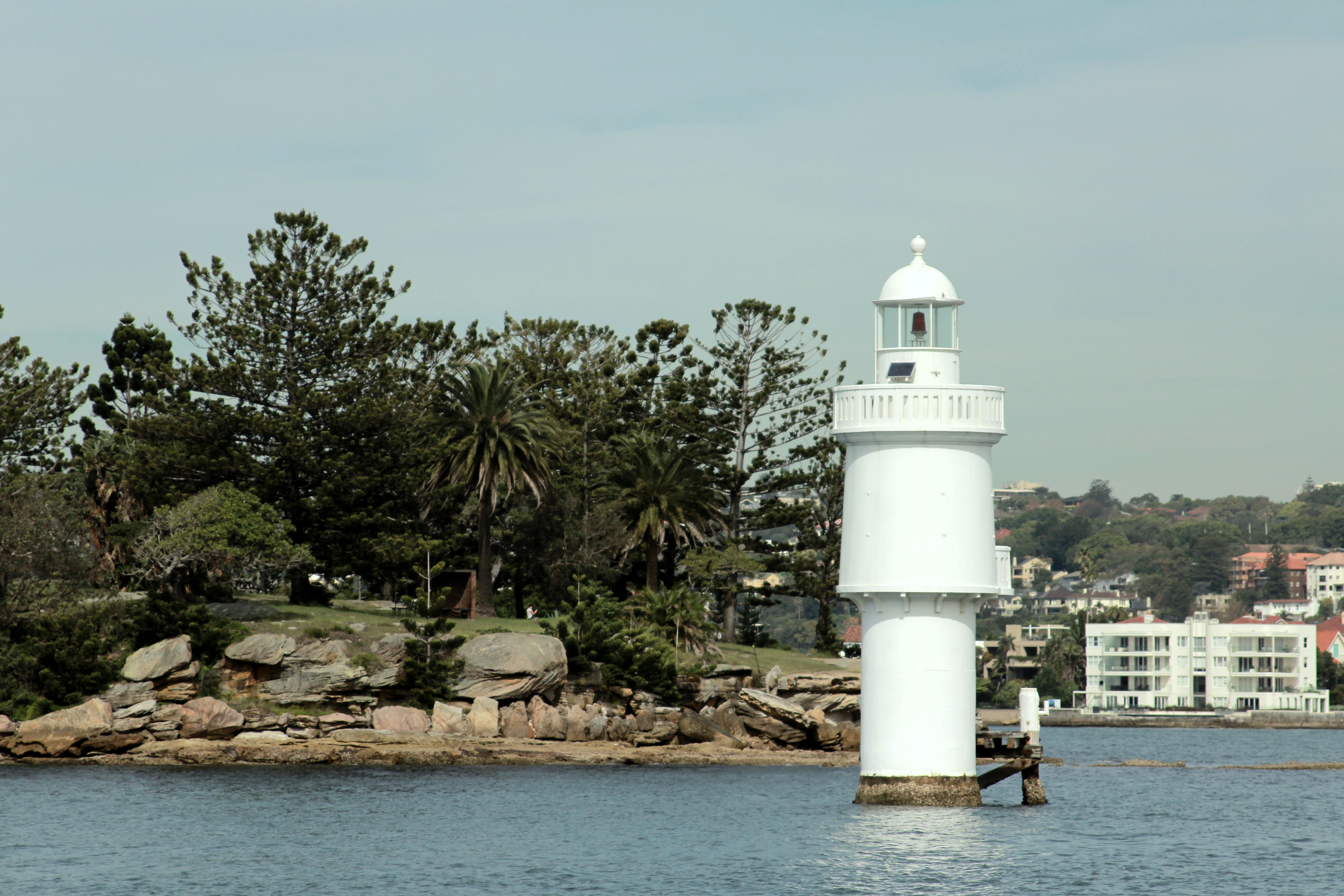
- Shark Island Light in front of Shark Island
- Location: Shark Island; New South Wales; Australia
- Coordinates: 33°51′23.59″S 151°15′25.85″E

Tower
- Constructed: 1913
- Height: 41 feet (12 m)
- Shape: cylindrical tower with balcony and lantern
- Markings: white tower and lantern

Light
- Focal height: 40 feet (12 m)
- Range: 6 nautical miles (11 km)
- Characteristic: Fl (3) R 8s.

Shark Island Light is an active pile lighthouse located just north of Shark Island, an island in Sydney Harbour, New South Wales, Australia. Its light is only visible on in the fairway of the harbour, between Shark Point and Point Piper.

== Site operation ==
The light is operated by the Sydney Ports Corporation, while the site is managed by the Department of Environment, Climate Change and Water as part of the Sydney Harbour National Park.

== Visiting ==
The lighthouse itself is only accessible by boat, and it is closed to the public. However, it is visible from Shark Island at close range. The island itself is open to the public, but capacity is limited and reservations are required.

== See also ==
- List of lighthouses in Australia
