= David Hickinbotham =

Australian rules footballer and coach

Personal information
- Full name: David Hickinbotham
- Born: 1862; Ashbourne, Victoria
- Died: 9 November 1941 (aged 79); Moolap, Victoria
- Original team: Geelong (VFA)
- Position: Centreman

Coaching career
| Years | Club | Games (W–L–D) |
| 1910–1911 | Geelong | 36 (18–16–2) |

David Hickinbotham (1862 – 9 November 1941) was an Australian rules footballer who played with Geelong in the Victorian Football Association (VFA) and coached them in the Victorian Football League (VFL).

Under Hickinbotham's captaincy, Geelong did not lose a single game in the 1886 VFA season on their way to the premiership. His sides were renowned for their fitness and physical preparation, while as a player he was regarded as one of the best centreman of the 1880s. Hickinbotham became Geelong's inaugural VFL coach in 1910 and was in charge for two seasons. He was particularly remembered for his best-on-ground performance in the famous 1886 "Match of the Century" against South Melbourne.
