= Hugh McLean (cricketer) =

Australian cricketer (1864–1915)

Personal information
- Born: 26 November 1864; Woodford, Victoria, Australia
- Died: 19 February 1915 (aged 50); Hawthorn, Victoria, Australia

Domestic team information
- Years: Team
- 1891–1892: Victoria
- Source: Cricinfo, 26 July 2015

Hugh McLean (26 November 1864 – 19 February 1915) was an Australian cricketer and Australian rules football player.

Educated at Geelong College, McLean played both cricket and football for the school and was described as the best player in both teams. He began playing for Geelong Football Club in the Victorian Football Association (VFA) while he was still in school and in 1882 he was the competition's leading goalkicker. He played for Geelong from 1882 to 1890 and again in 1892. Geelong won premierships in four of those seasons, 1882, 1883, 1884 and 1886. McLean also played with fellow VFA side Melbourne in 1890. He was regarded as one of the best players of his era.

He played two first-class cricket matches as a batsman for Victoria in 1891.

He died as the result of a railway accident in Melbourne, when he missed his footing getting off a train.

== See also ==
- List of Victoria first-class cricketers
