= 1878 VFA season =

2nd season of the Victorian Football Association

Overview
- Premiers: Geelong; 1st premiership
- Leading goalkicker: George Coulthard (Carlton – 18 goals)

The 1878 VFA season was the second season of the Victorian Football Association (VFA), the highest-level Australian rules football competition in the colony of Victoria.

Like the 1877 season, the existence of the VFA was effectively an administrative change only, and there was no significant change to the manner in which matches were scheduled and played – or the premiership decided – compared to the unaffiliated 1876 season.

The premiership was won by the Geelong Football Club, after it defeated Melbourne in a playoff match on 5 October. It was the club's first VFA premiership, and the first in a sequence of three consecutive premierships won from 1878 to 1880. Geelong was unbeaten during the year.

== Association membership ==
The number of senior metropolitan clubs in the Association increased from five to seven in 1878, with Essendon and West Melbourne being newly promoted to senior ranks for 1878, having been leading junior teams in 1877.

Additionally, several provincial teams, including premiers Geelong, competed as senior clubs affiliated with the Association.

== Metropolitan ==
Among the metropolitan clubs, Melbourne had the best record, finishing with eleven wins and five draws from its twenty-three matches, ahead of Carlton, whose record was seventeen wins and one draw from twenty-four matches.

Despite Carlton having a superior record, at the time, Melbourne and Carlton were considered to be by far the strongest of the metropolitan clubs, with Melbourne's position as the top club based almost entirely on the head-to-head matches between the two clubs, of which Melbourne won all four.

Among the provincial clubs, Geelong was by far the strongest, having gone through the season undefeated with fifteen wins and one draw from sixteen matches. However, Geelong had played only three games against metropolitan clubs (wins against West Melbourne, Carlton and Hotham), while its provincial opponents were not considered as strong as the metropolitan competition.

To resolve the matter of the premiership, Melbourne and Geelong scheduled a premiership play-off match — the first in Association history — for 5 October, the week after the season was to have finished, at the MCG. Geelong won the play-off match by four goals to win the premiership.

=== Club records ===
The below table details the playing records of the seven senior metropolitan clubs and Geelong in all matches during the 1878 season. Two sets of results are given:

- Senior results: based only upon games played against VFA senior metropolitan clubs
- Total results: including senior games, and games against intercolonial, up-country and junior clubs.

The clubs are listed in the order in which they were ranked in The Australasian. The VFA had no formal process by which the clubs were ranked, so the below order should be considered indicative only, particularly since the fixturing of matches was not standardised; however, the top three placings were later acknowledged in publications including the Football Record and are considered official. The senior records include the premiership playoff match.

Pos	Team	Senior results				Total results						Qualification
Pos	Team	Pld	W	L	D	Pld	W	L	D	GF	GA	Qualification
1	Geelong (P)	4	4	0	0	17	16	0	1	75	11	Playoff match
2	Melbourne	16	6	5	5	23	11	7	5	34	30	Playoff match
3	Carlton	13	8	5	0	24	17	6	1	69	23	
–	Hotham	10	4	4	2	19	9	4	3	20	8	
–	Essendon	10	3	3	4	18	8	3	7	28	11	
–	West Melbourne	10	2	5	3	18	6	5	7	18	12	
–	Albert Park	13	2	5	6	17	5	6	6	12	18	
–	St Kilda	6	1	3	2	11	2	6	3	6	30	

(P) Premiers

Note: Total results table include two wins for Melbourne and one win for Geelong against the visiting South Australian Victorian Club based in North Adelaide, South Australia who in the 1877 SAFA season were joint Premiers.

=== Playoff match ===
	1878 VFA premiership playoff match
Saturday, 5 October (3:30 pm)	Melbourne	def. by	Geelong	Melbourne Cricket Ground (Crowd: 7,000–8,000)
	1.1; 1.4	Half; Final	1.7; 5.12	Umpires: Graham (Essendon)
C. Baker		Goals	Booth 3, Christie, Douglass

== Notable events ==
- Carlton and Melbourne each hosted intercolonial clubs during the season – in both cases, the same clubs they had visited in 1877:
  - Carlton hosted the Waratah club from New South Wales, playing one match under the rugby rules prevalent in New South Wales and one match under the Victorian rules, as they had done the previous year during Carlton's visit to Sydney. The result of the rugby game on 29 June was disputed between the two clubs: both clubs claimed one goal and one touch-down, but the Carlton and Waratah umpires disagreed about whether or not Carlton's shot for goal had hit the post; consequently, Carlton claimed a 1–1 draw and Waratah claimed a 1–0 victory. In the Victorian rules game on 1 June, Carlton 2.13 defeated Waratah 1.2. Both clubs were lauded for their proficiency in their non-preferred code.
  - Melbourne hosted the Victorian club from South Australia Football Association (SAFA). Both matches were played under Victorian rules, which were in use in both Victoria and South Australia at the time. Melbourne won both games: on 17 August, Melbourne 1.23 d. Victorian (SAFA) 0.1; and, on 19 August, Melbourne 2.13 d. Victorian (SAFA) 0.4.
  - Geelong also hosted the Victorian (SAFA) club. The match was played at Corio Cricket Ground on 21 August, Geelong 6.26 d. Victorian (SAFA) 0.0
- The leading goalkickers for the season were Christie (Geelong) and George Coulthard (Carlton), who both kicked 15 goals.
