= 1879 VFA season =

3rd season of the Victorian Football Association

Overview
- Teams: 8
- Premiers: Geelong; 2nd premiership
- Leading goalkicker: George Coulthard (Carlton − 21 goals)

The 1879 VFA season was the third season of the Victorian Football Association (VFA), the highest-level Australian rules football competition in the colony of Victoria.

Geelong won the VFA premiership for the second time after completing a second consecutive unbeaten year. It was the club's second premiership in a sequence of three consecutive premierships won from 1878 to 1880.

== Association membership ==
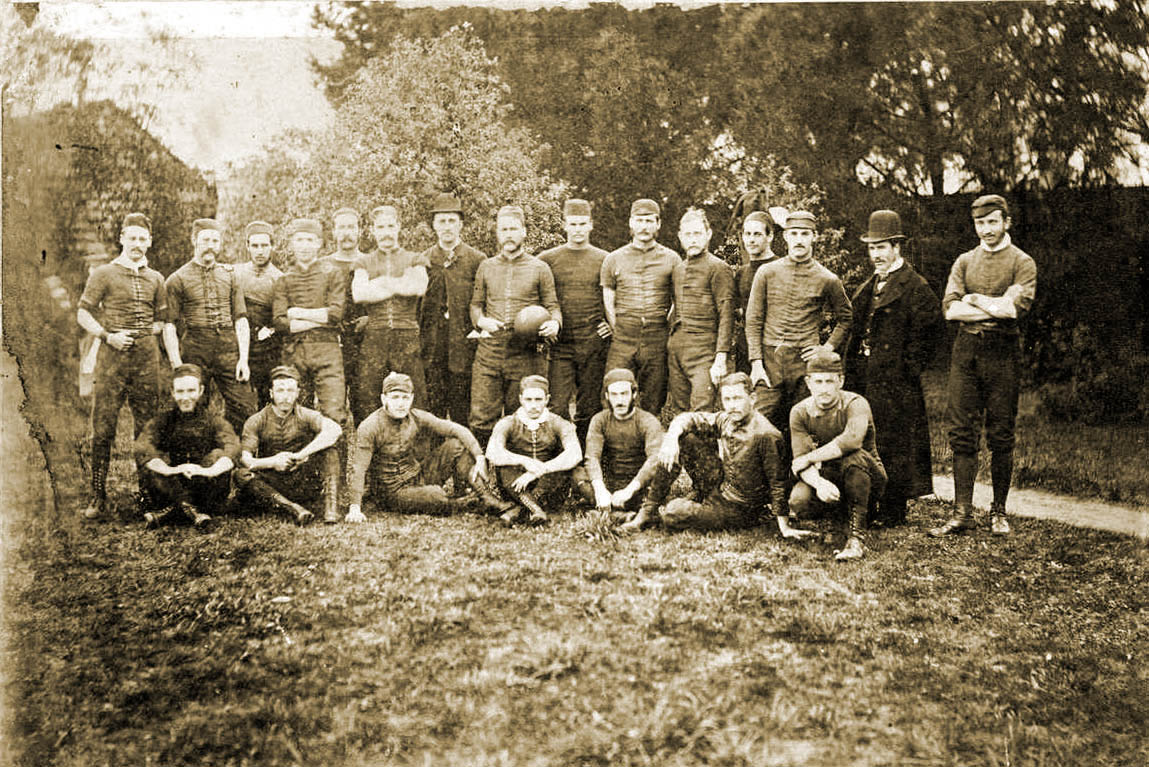
Melbourne team

The South Melbourne Football Club entered the senior ranks of the Association in 1879; however, while St Kilda was nominally a senior club to begin the year, it was in a weakened state and went into recess after playing five senior games.

The status of the Geelong Football Club also changed subtly in 1879. It had been a senior Association club since 1877, but it had played primarily against other provincial teams during 1877 and 1878. In its first premiership year of 1878, it played only four senior matches against metropolitan clubs, but in 1879, it played nine senior matches against metropolitan clubs. As such, although there was no formal change in its senior status, Geelong effectively shifted from being a provincial team, to being a provincially-based team competing in the metropolitan competition.

== 1879 VFA premiership ==
The 1879 premiership was won by the Geelong Football Club, the club's second in succession, finishing the season unbeaten with fifteen wins and one match (against West Melbourne) being abandoned as a draw five minutes from half-time after torrential rain swept the ground. Carlton finished second with sixteen wins and two draws from twenty-two games, with new senior club South Melbourne finishing third.

=== Club senior records ===
The below table details the playing records of the eight senior clubs in all matches during the 1879 season. Two sets of results are given:

- Senior results: based only upon games played against other VFA senior clubs
- Total results: including senior games, and games against intercolonial, up-country and junior clubs.

The clubs are listed in the order in which they were ranked in the Australasian newspaper. The VFA had no formal process by which the clubs were ranked, so the below order should be considered indicative only, particularly since the fixturing of matches was not standardised; however, the top three placings were later acknowledged in publications including the Football Record and are considered official.

1879 VFA Results
		Senior Results				Total Results					
	TEAM	P	W	L	D	P	W	L	D	GF	GA
1	Geelong (P)	9	8	0	1	16	15	0	1	61	10
2	Carlton	14	9	4	1	22	16	4	2	82	17
3	South Melbourne	9	5	4	0	18	14	4	0	35	13
	Melbourne	15	5	7	3	21	11	6	4	60	42
	West Melbourne	11	3	5	3	19	11	4	4	29	29
	Albert-park	7	2	3	2	16	8	5	3	31	14
	Essendon	10	2	6	2	17	6	6	5	30	30
	Hotham	11	2	7	2	17	6	7	4	19	28
Key: P = Played, W = Won, L = Lost, D = Drawn, GF = Goals For, GA = Goals Against, (P) = Premiers										Source:	

== Intercolonial matches ==
During 1879, a team representing the South Australian Football Association toured Victoria, and played two intercolonial matches against an Association representative team; the first on a public holiday Tuesday, and the other on the following Saturday. The games were the first ever intercolonial matches between colony representative teams.

	1879 Intercolonial Matches Victoria vs South Australia
Tuesday, 1 July	Victoria 7	def.	South Australia 0	East Melbourne Cricket Ground (crowd: 10,000)
Saturday, 5 July	Victoria 4	def.	South Australia 1	East Melbourne Cricket Ground (crowd: 6,000)

== Notable events ==
- A night match was staged between Melbourne and Carlton on Wednesday 13 August at the Melbourne Cricket Ground. The match was played under electric light, a new invention of which proponents were keen to display the effectiveness, and which had been successfully trialled for night football matches in England during the previous year. The trial in Melbourne proved much less successful, as the field was unevenly illuminated, making it impossible for spectators to see much of the play. A white football was used to make the ball more visible, except for a brief period in the first half when the initial ball deflated and a normal football – which was barely visible in the dim light – was used until it could be replaced. Carlton won the match, which did not count towards the premiership, by the score 3–0 before a crowd of around 5,000. The match was the second night football match played in Melbourne: a military match between Collingwood Rifles and East Melbourne Artillery had been played on Tuesday 5 August before a crowd of 10,000.
- In the 27 September match between Melbourne and Carlton, Melbourne intended to field Sandilands, a former Geelong player it claimed had moved to Melbourne, entitling him to a residential clearance; Carlton objected, on the understanding that Sandilands was en route to another colony and was therefore not entitled to the residential clearance. When the two clubs reached an impasse on the matter of Sandilands' inclusion, Melbourne left the ground and the match was called off, despite 8,000 spectators already being present.

== See also ==
- Wyoming Seminary vs. Mansfield State Normal (1892), the first night game in American football
