= 1880 VFA season =

4th season of the Victorian Football Association

Overview
- Teams: 8
- Premiers: Geelong; 3rd premiership
- Leading goalkicker: George Coulthard (Carlton − 21 goals)

The 1880 VFA season was the fourth season of the Victorian Football Association (VFA), the highest-level Australian rules football competition in the colony of Victoria.

The premiership was won by the Geelong Football Club. It was the club's third VFA premiership, and the last in a sequence of three consecutive premierships won from 1878 to 1880; Geelong lost two matches for the season, its first losses since 1877, having been unbeaten through the previous two years.

== Association membership ==
Between the 1879 and 1880 seasons, the Albert-park and South Melbourne football clubs amalgamated, with the merged entity known as South Melbourne. East Melbourne entered the senior ranks of the association. As such, the senior membership of the Association remained at eight clubs.

== 1880 VFA premiership ==
The 1880 premiership was won by the Geelong Football Club, which finished with a record of 9–1–2 in senior games and 14–2–2 overall. Geelong finished ahead of the newly amalgamated South Melbourne club, whose senior record of 9–2–3 was similarly meritorious, but whose overall record of 13–5–2 fell short of Geelong's. Carlton finished third.

=== Club records ===
The below table details the playing records of the eight clubs in all matches during the 1880 season. Two sets of results are given:

- Senior results: based only upon games played against other VFA senior clubs
- Total results: including senior games, and games against intercolonial, up-country and junior clubs.

The clubs are listed in the order in which they were ranked in The Australasian. The VFA had no formal process by which the clubs were ranked, so the below order should be considered indicative only, particularly since the fixturing of matches was not standardised; however, the top three placings were later acknowledged in publications including the Football Record and are considered official.

Pos	Team	Senior results				Total results					
Pos	Team	Pld	W	L	D	Pld	W	L	D	GF	GA
1	Geelong (P)	12	9	1	2	18	14	2	2	81	17
2	South Melbourne	14	9	2	3	20	13	5	2	52	17
3	Carlton	12	7	2	3	22	16	2	4	88	20
	Melbourne	15	4	4	7	22	9	5	8	43	27
	Hotham	11	4	4	3	19	10	4	5	30	17
	Essendon	15	3	7	4	19	8	7	4	39	
	West Melbourne	9	1	7	1	14	4	9	1	18	
	East Melbourne	11	0	10	1	22	6	15	1		

(P) Premiers

== Awards ==
- The leading goalkicker for the season was George Coulthard (Carlton), who kicked 21 goals.

== Intercolonial matches ==
An Association representative team toured South Australia in August, playing three intercolonial matches – two at even strength against the South Australian Football Association representative team, and one against a team of twenty-three South Australian-born players – and winning all three. J. Gibson (South Melbourne) served as captain of the Association team.

	1880 Intercolonial Matches
Saturday, 14 August	South Australia 2.7	def. by	Victoria 5.13	Adelaide Oval (crowd: 4,000)
Wednesday, 18 August	South Australian-born (23) 1.1	def. by	Victoria 5.17	Adelaide Oval (crowd: 1,500)
Saturday, 21 August	South Australia 0.6	def. by	Victoria 3.21	Adelaide Oval (crowd: 2,500)
