= 1881 VFA season =

5th season of the Victorian Football Association

Overview
- Date: 30 April – 1 October 1881
- Teams: 7
- Premiers: South Melbourne; 1st premiership
- Leading goalkicker: Eddy Brookes (Carlton − 20 goals)

The 1881 VFA season was the fifth season of the Victorian Football Association (VFA), the highest-level senior Australian rules football competition in the colony of Victoria.

South Melbourne won the premiership for the first time, after finishing the season with seven wins from its eleven senior matches.

== Association membership ==
Prior to the start of the 1881 season, the West Melbourne Football Club resigned from the senior ranks of the Association, leaving seven clubs.

== Premiership season ==
The 1881 premiership was won by the South Melbourne Football Club, with Geelong placing second.

The two clubs had almost equal records in senior matches played, with South Melbourne winning seven and drawing three of eleven matches, and Geelong winning seven and drawing two of ten matches. South Melbourne's sole loss was against Carlton, while Geelong's loss came against South Melbourne. It was thought that both could lay some claim to the premiership, but the consensus among the major newspapers was that South Melbourne was the premier club as the other match they played against Geelong had been drawn. Carlton finished third.

=== Club records ===
The below table details the playing records of the eight clubs in all matches during the 1880 season. Two sets of results are given:

- Senior results: based only upon games played against other VFA senior clubs
- Total results: including senior games, and games against intercolonial, up-country and junior clubs.

The clubs are listed in the order in which they were ranked in The Australasian. The VFA had no formal process by which the clubs were ranked, so the below order should be considered indicative only, particularly since the fixturing of matches was not standardised; however, the top three placings were later acknowledged in publications including the Football Record and are considered official.

It is noted that although East Melbourne was a senior club in 1881, it was very uncompetitive, so, in its review of the season the Australasian did not consider matches against East Melbourne amongst its senior results. As such, in the below table, the 'Senior Results' does not include matches against East Melbourne, but East Melbourne's results against the other senior clubs are given.

Some data is missing from the below table based on the availability of information.

Pos	Team	Senior results				Total results					
Pos	Team	Pld	W	L	D	Pld	W	L	D	GF	GA
1	South Melbourne (P)	11	7	1	3	19	15	3	1	63	15
2	Geelong	10	7	1	2	18	15	1	2	94	20
3	Carlton	11	5	3	3	24	18	3	3	107	33
	Melbourne	14	4	6	4	24	14	6	4	79	44
	Hotham	12	1	9	2	19	5	10	4	35	41
	Essendon	10	2	6	2	18	5	8	5	26	42
	East Melbourne	12	0	9	3	21	6	10	5	29	55

(P) Premiers

== Awards ==
- The leading goalkicker for the season was Eddy Brookes (Carlton), who kicked 20 goals.

== Intercolonial matches ==
Association representative teams played four intercolonial matches during 1881: two against New South Wales, and two against South Australia. All were played under Victorian rules.

	1881 Intercolonial Matches
Friday, 1 July	Victoria 9.24	def.	New South Wales 0.1	Melbourne Cricket Ground (crowd: 3,000)
Saturday, 6 August	New South Wales 1.8	def. by	Victoria 9.16	Association Cricket Ground (crowd: 5,000)
Saturday, 20 August	Victoria 8.24	def.	South Australia 1.8	East Melbourne Cricket Ground
Wednesday, 24 August	Victoria 4.14	def.	South Australia 1.5	East Melbourne Cricket Ground (crowd: 1,000)

== See also ==
- 1881 Victorian football season
