= 1875 Victorian football season =

6th senior season of Australian rules football in Victoria

- Senior teams: 7
- Premiers: Carlton; 4th premiership
- Challenge Cup: Carlton Imperial; 1st Challenge Cup win
- Leading goalkicker: Billy Dedman (Carlton – 13 goals)

The 1875 Victorian football season was the sixth senior season of Australian rules football in the colony of Victoria. Carlton was the premier metropolitan club for the fourth time, while Geelong was the premier provincial club.

== Metropolitan ==
Seven metropolitan clubs participated in senior football during the 1875 season: Albert Park, Carlton, Carlton Imperial, East Melbourne, Melbourne, North Melbourne and St Kilda cum University (a combined St Kilda and Melbourne University team).

The 1875 edition of The Footballer listed as many as 34 junior clubs that played matches throughout the season: Adeplhian, Abbotsford United, Albion Union, Alma, Brunswick, Carlton Rifles, Cambridge Union, Clifton, East St Kilda, Elwood, Esplanade, Essendon, Excelsior, Fawkner Park, Hawthorn, Hotham United, Jolimont, Richmond, Richmond Standard, Sands and McDougall, St Kilda Alma, South Melbourne, South Melbourne Imperial, South-park, Southern Rifles, Southern, Star of Richmond, Vaucluse, Victoria Parade, West Melbourne, West Richmond, Williamstown, and Windsor.

=== Season ===
As had been the case for several years, Carlton and Melbourne were considered the dominant clubs in the city, so the premier club was decided based entirely on the head-to-head record between the clubs. In their four meetings, Carlton won three and Melbourne won one, so Carlton was recognised as the premier club for the season.

A Challenge Cup played as a double round-robin amongst the second twenties (reserves teams) of the senior clubs was staged during the season. The Cup was won by Carlton Imperial, after it defeated Albert Park 1–0 in the final on 9 October.

=== Senior records ===
The table shows the results for senior clubs during the 1875 season across all matches, including senior, junior and odds matches.

Clubs are listed in the order in which they were ranked in The Australasian newspaper. Other than announcing the top three place-getters, there was no formal process by which the clubs were ranked, so the below order should be considered indicative only (particularly because the fixturing of matches was not standardised).

Pos	Team	Pld	W	L	D	GF	GA
1	Carlton (P)	17	12	1	4	36	5
2	Melbourne	18	12	3	3	43	9
3	Carlton Imperial	11	5	2	4	20	12
–	North Melbourne	11	6	1	4	19	6
–	East Melbourne	14	6	5	3	18	11
–	Albert Park	10	0	7	3	2	22
–	St Kilda cum University	9	0	6	3	1	21

(P) Premiers

== Provincial ==
Geelong were premiers in the provincial competition. Other senior provincial clubs in 1875 included Ballarat, Ballarat Imperial, Beechworth, Castlemaine, Inglewood, Rochester and South Ballarat.

In addition to the premiership, Geelong became the permanent owners of the Western District Challenge Cup, which it had held since the start of 1874. The club won the cup after its controversial win against Ballarat on 25 September at the Argyle Ground in Geelong. In the match, Austin of Geelong, while in possession of the ball, weaved through several spectators who were encroaching on the playing field, before passing to Fairbain who kicked a goal. Ballarat protested against the goal based on interference, and when the goal was upheld, walked off the ground and forfeited the match.
