= 1876 Victorian football season =

7th senior season of Australian rules football in Victoria

- Senior teams: 13
- Premiers: Melbourne; 3rd premiership
- Leading goalkicker: Billy Dedman (Carlton – 18 goals)

The 1876 Victorian football season was the seventh senior season of Australian rules football in the colony of Victoria. Melbourne was the premier metropolitan club for the third time, while Barwon was the premier provincial club.

This was the final season of decentralised administration of football in Victoria, with the Victorian Football Association (VFA) formed the following year to provide a committee-based approach to the administration of the sport.

== Clubs ==
=== Founded ===
The following clubs were established ahead of the 1876 season:

Club	Region	Ref
Kew	Metropolitan	

=== Mergers ===
==== Albert-park cum North Melbourne ====
In May 1876, shortly before the start of the season, the North Melbourne Football Club was disbanded, and most senior players and many members of the club joined the Albert-park Football Club, which was itself in a weakened position due to the departure of many players. There was no formal amalgamation between the two clubs, but Albert-park took on a strong North Melbourne character, fielding more former North Melbourne players than Albert-park players, and many fans openly cheered for North Melbourne rather than Albert-park – and some in the media came to describe the club as "Albert-park cum North Melbourne". The arrangement lasted only for one year, and the Hotham Football Club was re-established in North Melbourne in 1877.

== Metropolitan ==
Six metropolitan clubs participated in senior football during the 1876 season: Albert Park, Carlton, Carlton Imperial, East Melbourne, Melbourne and St Kilda. As had been the case for a few years, Carlton and Melbourne were considered the dominant clubs in the city, so the premier club was decided based entirely on the head-to-head record between the clubs; in their four meetings, Melbourne won two, Carlton won one, and one was drawn, so Melbourne was recognised as the premier club for the season.

Albert Park won the Second Twenties' Challenge Cup, while Williamstown was the leading junior club and won the Junior Challenge Cup.

=== Disputed match between Carlton and Melbourne ===
The result of the final match for the season, a de facto premiership playoff match between Carlton and Melbourne held at the Madeline Street Reserve on 23 September was disputed between the two clubs, owing to a disagreement over whether the first half goal scored by Melbourne's Fred Baker was valid. Baker had taken a mark right on the goal line and quickly kicked the ball between the posts, despite protests by Carlton players that Baker had illegally pushed Carlton defender Harry Nudd out of the marking contest.

According to The Australasian reporter Peter Pindar, who reported the details of a conversation he had with field umpire Searcey after the game, Searcey agreed that Nudd had been illegally pushed and was about to annul the goal (which the goal umpire had already awarded) and award a free kick when the Carlton players began to protest. However, Searcy was offended by the language that the Carlton players had used toward him and instead left the ground immediately, without having resolved the issue of the goal. There was a delay of fifteen minutes before a new umpire, Bride, could be found, during which Carlton unsuccessfully protested the awarding of the goal. Each club scored one additional goal during the rest of the game, resulting in a 2–1 victory for Melbourne.

Following the match, Carlton maintained its position of disputing Baker's goal, and claimed the match as a 1–1 draw; with no formal means of resolving the dispute, both clubs maintained their positions to the point that the two clubs reported different results for the match in their annual reports.

Despite this discrepancy, the major newspapers all considered the match to be a Melbourne victory; as the four matches between Carlton and Melbourne saw Melbourne win twice (including in this match) and Carlton win once, with the other match being drawn, Melbourne was thus declared the premier club for the season.

=== Club records ===
The below table shows the results for senior clubs during the 1876 season. The list shows the club records across all matches, including senior, junior and odds matches.

The clubs are listed here in the order in which they were ranked in the Australasian newspaper: other than announcing the top three place-getters, there was no formal process by which the clubs were ranked, so the below order should be considered indicative only, particularly since the fixturing of matches was not standardised.

Pos	Team	Pld	W	L	D	GF	GA
1	Melbourne (P)	17	10	2	5	33	15
2	Carlton	20	15	2	3	54	12
3	Albert Park	10	6	2	2	18	7
–	St Kilda	15	5	5	5	17	18
–	East Melbourne	13	3	4	6	18	17
–	Carlton Imperial	8	2	6	0	16	18

(P) Premiers

== Provincial ==
In the provincial competition, Barwon was the premier team, and was the winner of the Geelong, Ballarat and Wimmera District Challenge Cup. Barwon was presented with the cup after defeating Geelong 2–1 on 29 July.

=== Club records ===
Pos	Team	Pld	W	L	D	GF	GA
1	Barwon (P)	8	6	2	0	19	9
–	Geelong	11	3	5	3	16	16
–	Geelong Imperial	5	1	2	2	3	5
–	Bendigo	4	2	2	0	3	8
–	Ararat	3	1	2	0	3	8
–	Ballarat	11	6	2	3	19	10
–	Maryborough	9	4	4	1	16	10

(P) Premiers
