= History of Australian rules football in Victoria (1859–1900) =

Early years of Australian Rules Football in Victoria
19th century records
- Champion clubs Challenge Cups for Senior clubs.: 1862 University; 1863 Melbourne, Geelong; 1864 Geelong; 1865 Melbourne, University, South Yarra; 1866 South Yarra; 1870 Albert Park (disputed); 1871 Carlton; Premiership: 1870 Melbourne; 1871 Carlton; 1872 Melbourne; 1873 Carlton; 1874 Carlton; 1875 Carlton; 1876 Melbourne; Following the establishment of the Victorian Football Association in 1877, the VFA announced a Premier team. This was usually the club with the highest number of wins but this was not always the case; if a high proportion of wins were against Junior clubs, this would count against the team. The following list shows the teams recognised as the top four VFA clubs from 1877–96 (in consecutive order). In 1888, the VFA published a list of the final four clubs at the end of what are now called home-and-away matches. However, the listings for 1877 to 1887 are based on various newspaper reports. Between 1897 and 1900, the top teams for both the VFA and VFL are listed: 1877; Carlton; Melbourne; Hotham; Albert Park; 1878; Geelong; Melbourne; Carlton; Hotham; 1879; Geelong; Carlton; South Melbourne; Melbourne; 1880; Geelong; South Melbourne; Carlton; Melbourne; 1881; South Melbourne; Geelong; Carlton; Melbourne; 1882; Geelong; Essendon; South Melbourne; Carlton; 1883; Geelong; South Melbourne; Carlton; Melbourne; 1884; Geelong; Essendon; Hotham; South Melbourne; 1885; South Melbourne; Essendon; Geelong; Carlton; 1886; Geelong; South Melbourne; Carlton; Port Melbourne; 1887; Carlton; Geelong; South Melbourne; Fitzroy; 1888; South Melbourne; Geelong; Williamstown; Carlton; 1889; South Melbourne; Carlton; Port Melbourne; Essendon; 1890; South Melbourne; Carlton; Essendon; Fitzroy; 1891; Essendon; Carlton; Fitzroy; South Melbourne; 1892; Essendon; Fitzroy; Geelong; Melbourne; 1893; Essendon; Melbourne; Geelong; South Melbourne; 1894; Essendon; Melbourne; South Melbourne; Fitzroy; 1895; Fitzroy; Geelong; Melbourne; Collingwood; 1896; Collingwood; South Melbourne; Essendon; Melbourne; 1897; Port Melbourne (VFA); Essendon (VFL); North Melbourne (VFA); Geelong (VFL); Footscray (VFA); Collingwood (VFL); Williamstown (VFA); Melbourne (VFL); 1898; Footscray (VFA); Fitzroy (VFL); North Melbourne (VFA); Essendon (VFL); Port Melbourne (VFA); Collingwood (VFL); Richmond (VFA); Geelong (VFL); 1899; Footscray (VFA); Fitzroy (VFL); North Melbourne (VFA); Essendon (VFL); Port Melbourne (VFA); Geelong (VFL); Williamstown (VFA); Collingwood (VFL); 1900; Footscray (VFA); Melbourne (VFL); Williamstown (VFA); Fitzroy (VFL); Richmond (VFA); Essendon (VFL); Prahran (VFA); Collingwood (VFL)
- Leading goalkickers 1858–66 ? 1867 12: L. N. Bell (Melbourne); 1868–71 ? 1872 6: J. Donovan (Carlton); C. Loughnan (Melbourne); 1873 ? 1874 10: W. Dedman (Carlton); 1875 13: W. Dedman (Carlton); 1876 18: W. Dedman (Carlton); 1877 12: C. Baker (Melbourne); 1878 ? 1879 19: George Coulthard (Carlton); 1880 33 (some scored on tour & interstate); Percy Douglass (Geelong); 21: George Coulthard (Carlton); 1881 25: E. Brooks (Carlton); 1882 29: Hugh McLean (Geelong); 1883 29: Phil McShane (Geelong); 1884 33: Phil McShane (Geelong); 1885 38: G. Houston (Hotham); 1886 51: Phil McShane (Geelong); 1887 36: Tom McShane (Geelong); 1888 50: "Dinny" McKay (South Melbourne); 1889 40: Edgar Barrett (South Melbourne); 1890 49: Jim Grace (Fitzroy); 1891 37: Jim Grace (Fitzroy); 1892 56: Albert Thurgood (Essendon); 1893 64: Albert Thurgood (Essendon); 1894 63: Albert Thurgood (Essendon); 1895 42: Dave de Coite (Geelong); 1896 ? 1897 – VFA 38: Daly (Port Melbourne); 1897 – VFL 27: E. James (Geelong); 1898 – VFA ? 1898 – VFL 31: Archie Smith (Collingwood); 1899 – VFA 39: Daly (Footscray); 1899 – VFL 32: E. James (Geelong); 1900 – VFA 32: Daly (Footscray); 1900 – VFL 26: Albert Thurgood (Essendon)

Australian rules football was first organised in 1859 when its rules were codified by the Melbourne Football Club in Victoria, which was at the time a British colony.

== First rules: 1859 ==
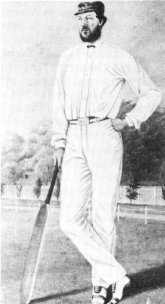
Tom Wills

The original local football rules were drafted on 17 May 1859, in a meeting between four members of the Melbourne Cricket Club (MCC), which included Tom Wills, William Hammersley, J. B. Thompson and Thomas Smith. The meeting was held at the Parade Hotel on the site of the present MCG Hotel. Wills, a renowned cricketer, was secretary of the MCC. He had attended Rugby School and was familiar with the argument between the proponents of allowing players to handle the ball (i.e., Rugby football) and those who wanted players to use their feet only, the style later adopted by the Football Association.

== 1859 – Geelong rules ==
Below are the rules for Australian Rules Football, alleged to have been used by the Geelong Football Club in 1859. They were originally written down by hand. This is strange, as when Geelong formed in July 1859, they used the Melbourne rules. Graeme Atkinson, writing in Everything You Wanted Know About Australian Rules Football ... considers it likely that these Geelong rules were drawn up prior to the first rules of the Melbourne Football Club which were drafted on 17 May 1859.

1. Distance between goals and the goal posts to be decided by captains.

2. Teams of 25 in grand matches, but up to 30 against odds.

3. Matches to be played in 2 halves of 50 minutes. At the end of first 50 teams may leave ground for 20 minutes for refreshments but must be ready to resume on time otherwise rival captain can call game off or (if his side has scored) claim it as a win.

4. Game played with 200 yard [sic.] [182.9 metre] space, same to be measured equally on each side of a line drawn through the centre of the two goals, and two posts to be called "kick off" posts shall be erected at a distance of 20 yards [18.3 metres] on each side of the goal posts at both ends and in a straight line between them.

5. When kicked behind goal, ball may be brought 20 yards in front of any portion of the space between the kick off and kicked as nearly as possibly [sic.] in line with opposite goal.

6. Ball must be bounced every 10 or 20 yards when carried.

7. Tripping, holding, hacking prohibited. Pushing with hands or body is allowed when any player is in rapid motion or in possession of ball, except in the case of a mark.

8. Mark is when a player catches the ball before it hits the ground and has been clearly kicked by another player.

9. Handball only allowed if ball held clearly in one hand and punched or hit out with other. If caught, no mark. Throwing is prohibited.

10. Before game captains coin toss for ends.

11. In case of infringements, captain may claim free from where breach occurred. Except where umpires appointed, opposing captain to adjudicate.

12. In all grand matches two umpires – one from each side – will take up position as near as possible between the goal posts and centre. When breach is made appeal to go to nearest umpire.

It is usually agreed that it was Rule 8, which covers marking, is the one that differentiated the Australian game from any other set of football rules. Rule 9, which covers handballing, also defines a major feature of the Australian game. The lack of any offside rule is also considered a vital differentiation from other forms of football.

Reference to "the 'kick off' posts" in Rule 4 is important. These are obviously what are now known as behind posts and which have always been an important feature of the game. Until 1878, kicks between the goal-post and kick off posts were not recorded. However, after that date, behinds were noted but did not count towards the score.

Despite the fact that Tom Wills had helped referee the Melbourne Grammar v Scotch College game in 1858, Field Umpires did not become a regular feature of the game until 1872. Under Rule 11 the captains were usually responsible for adjudicating on infringements and disputations. Rule 12 does make provision for the appointment of two Umpires but these are really only goal umpires.

Of course, rules continued (and still continue) to evolve. More information on the features that make Australian Rules distinctive, is found under the heading: "Features of the Game" (below).

== 1860 rules ==
Below are the rules as refined in 1860 by a meeting of the Melbourne Football Club but with some input from other existing clubs.

1. The distance between the goals and the goal posts shall be decided upon by the captains of the sides playing.

2. The captains on each side toss for choice of goal; the side losing the toss has the kick-off from the centre point between the goals.

3. A goal must be kicked fairly between the posts without touching either of them or any portion of the person of one of the opposite side. In case of the ball being forced between the goal posts in a scrimmage, a goal shall be awarded.

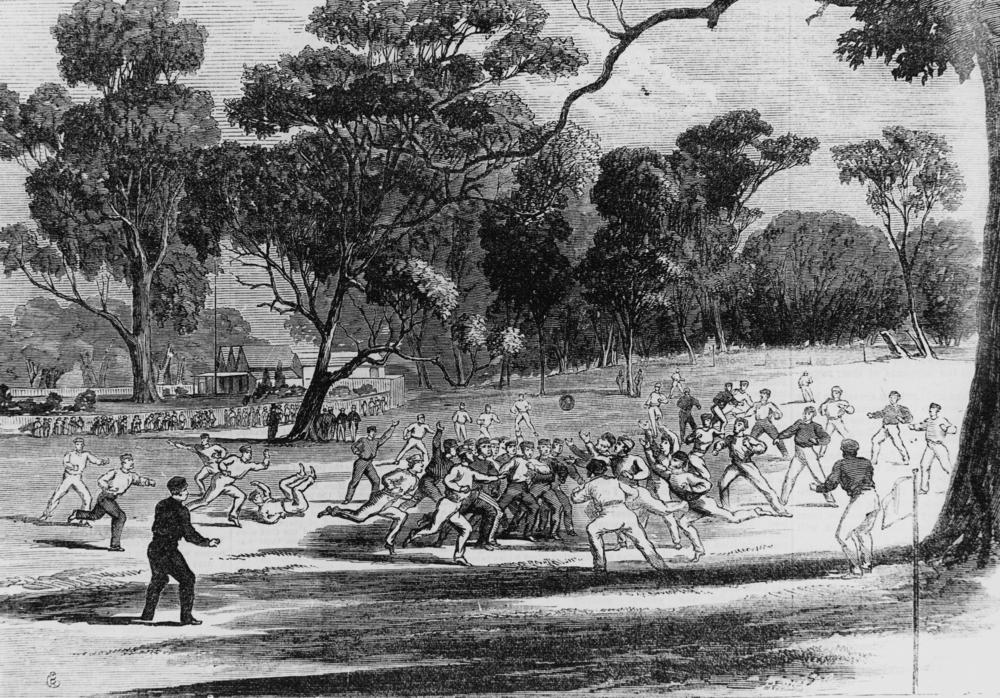
A game at the Richmond Paddock in the 1860s. A pavilion at the MCG is on the left in the background. (A wood engraving made by Robert Bruce on 27 July 1866.)

4. The game shall be played within a space of not more than 200 yds [182.9 metres] wide, the same to be measured equally on either side of a line drawn through the centre of the two goals; and the two posts, to be called kick-off posts, shall be erected at a distance of twenty yards [18.3 metres] on each side of the goal posts at both ends, and in a straight line with them.

5. In case the ball is kicked behind the goal, any one of the side behind whose goal it is kicked, may bring it twenty yards in front of any portion of the space between the "kick-off" posts, and shall kick it nearly as possible in line with the opposite goal.

6. Any player catching the ball directly from the foot may call "mark". He then has a free kick; no player from the opposite side being allowed to come inside the spot marked.

7. Tripping, holding and hacking are strictly prohibited. Pushing with the hands or body is allowed when any player is in rapid motion or in possession of the ball, except in the case provided for in Rule 6.

8. The ball may not be lifted from the ground in any circumstances, or taken in hand, except as provided for in Rule 6 (catch from the foot) or when on the pick-up. It shall not be run with in any case.

9. When a ball goes out of bounds (same being indicated by a row of posts) it shall be brought back to the point where it crossed the boundary line, and thrown in at right angles with that line.

10. The ball, while still in play, must under no circumstances, be thrown.

11. In case of a deliberate infringement of any of the above rules, by either side, the captain of the opposite side may claim that any one of his party may have a free kick from the place where the breach of the rules was made; the two captains in all cases, save where umpires are appointed, to be the sole judges of "infringements".

Until the 1980s, the earliest known rules were a printed set that came out of a meeting of delegates of the various clubs, held at the Freemason's Hotel, Melbourne on 8 May 1866. Copies [made at unknown date] of the 1859 set of rules and the 1860 rules, referred to above, both hand-written, have been unearthed in recent years.

== Features of the game ==
=== Kicking ===
When the game was first played the types of kicks used were the punt kick, the place kick and the drop kick.

The punt kick is still an important part of the game.

The place kick, usually associated with rugby league, rugby union and gridiron was used in Aussie Rules for many years, particularly for kicking for goal. It was mainly favoured because of the distance the ball would travel after being place kicked. It was rarely used after the 1920s.

The drop kick was an important feature of the game for many decades mainly because of its accuracy, but it fell into disuse as the pace of the game speeded up and it was rarely used after the 1960s.

The stab kick (or stab pass) was devised in the early days of the 20th century, probably by Collingwood players during a 1902 tour of Tasmania, where weak opposition teams led Collingwood players to experiment. The stab's discovery is usually attributed to Dick Condon but Eddie Drohan, Charlie Pannam and Bob Rush would have also contributed. (Some writers suggest that the Stab Pass was used even earlier and cite the Rev. A Brown who played for South Melbourne in the early 1880s. Nevertheless, it did not become a feature of the game until after Collingwood's 1902 Tasmanian tour.) The concentration on Collingwood and its players is not accidental, because the original Sherrin football, initially only used by Collingwood, was specifically designed to facilitate the stab-kick. Prior to the especially designed Sherrin football, the standard football was, essentially, a rugby ball. The stab pass also fell into disuse after the 1970s.

=== Bouncing the ball ===
Rule 6 of the rules drawn up in 1859 state that the ball should be bounced every 10 or 20 yards (9.14 to 18.29 metres). However, in the first few seasons there appears to have been an agreement between the clubs not to allow any running with the ball. This was mainly an attempt to curb H.C.A. Harrison who ran with great speed, carrying the ball Rugby style. Nevertheless, it is known that the agreement was sometimes ignored, such as during the Melbourne v Richmond game on 5 June 1860 and a Royal Park v Melbourne game in 1863. The latter led to the rule about bouncing being more strictly observed. When the rules were redrawn in 1866, the distance between bounces was reduced to a flat 10 yards.

=== Marks ===
The 1859 rules made provision for marking but they were usually taken on the chest or, sometimes, on the shoulder or with the hands outstretched but with the feet still firmly on the ground.

Probably the first player to make the spectacular leaps that are now a feature of the game, was Charles "Commotion" Pearson who played for Essendon in the mid-1880s. (Note: Pearson's nickname, Commotion, may well have come about because, between 1881 and 1885, The Hon. W. Pearson had a champion racehorse with that same name.) It is said that ladies in the crowd screamed for fear that Pearson may injure himself or others. The Argus prophetically said: While Mr Pearson takes risks with his rocket-like leaps into the air, who knows but that this may be a new revolution in high marking. What a thrill the game would become as a spectacle if all players tried out this new idea. Perhaps in years to come we will see players all over the field sailing up in the air in this 'Pearson-like' fashion. While Pearson is usually attributed with first devising the high mark, contemporaries such as Harry Todd (Hotham/North Melbourne) and Jack Kerley (Geelong) were also making similar high leaps.

=== Tagging the opposition ===
Tagging is not as new as many people may imagine. In 1885, a newspaper reporter objected to the tactics of both clubs during a Fitzroy v Carlton game. Fitzroy instructed "Dummy" Muir to watch Carlton's Baker, and Carlton had a player watching Paddy McShane. (Note: Although this would now be considered to be politically incorrect, the nickname, Dummy, came about because Muir was a mute.)

The following report of a South Melbourne v Melbourne game appeared in The Australasian of 14 July 1894: Someone told them (Melbourne) that McKnight, Windley and Waugh were the backbone of the Southern team and they immediately conceived the idea of telling men off to block these players. Moysey was directed to shadow McKnight, young Wardill had to prevent Windley getting possession ... and Lewis was appointed to control the movements of Waugh. Their instructions were very definite. They were all three told that it did not matter whether they got a kick themselves at all in the match, if they only succeeded in spoiling the play of the three South cracks. Those who were present at the match can say how well these instructions were carried out. There was nothing in the tactics adopted that infringed a solitary rule of the game and the plan was singularly effective, but I own to feeling a shade of doubt concerning the manliness of the whole proceeding. I would certainly have preferred to see the representatives of the grand old Melbourne win ... purely upon their superior prowess as players.

== 1860s and 1870s ==
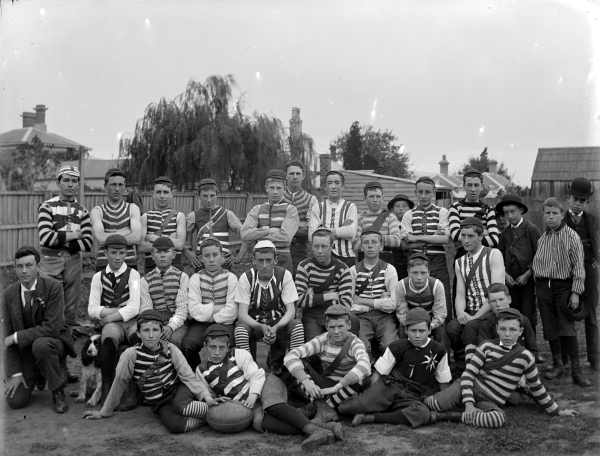
A Geelong junior team. Note the variety of jumpers. Nevertheless, there a good number of players wearing horizontal stripes, presumably in the Geelong colours of blue and white.

Within a few years of the drafting of the early rules, there were no fewer than 19 football clubs using the rules drafted at the Parade Hotel. The following clubs are known to have existed by the mid-1860s:

†Defunct

1858 teams (playing under hybrid rules or rugby)

- †South Yarra Football Club (25 September 1858 – 1873)
- Melbourne Football Club (1858 – present incorporated on 17 May 1859).
- †St Kilda Football Club (1858 – 1864) (unrelated to current St Kilda Football Club)
- Richmond (1858 – unknown)
- Albert Park (1858 – unknown)
- Melbourne Grammar (1858 – present)
- Scotch College (1858 – present)
- St Kilda Grammar School (1858 – unknown)

1859 teams

- Melbourne University Football Club (Prior to June 1859 – present)
- †Coast Football Club (Prior to June 1859 – 1877)
- †Brighton Football Club (9 June – unknown)
- Castlemaine Football Club (15 June 1859 – present)
- Geelong Football Club (18 July 1859 – present)
- †Emerald Hill Football Club (prior to August 1859)
- †Prahran Football Club (prior to August 1859)

Other early clubs

- Ballarat Football Club (20 May 1860 – present)
- Albert-park (originally South Melbourne, then Emerald-hill)
- Ballarat
- Brunswick
- Carlton
- Collingwood (no association with the present club, formed in 1892)
- Melbourne Grammar School
- Northcote
- Richmond (no association with the present club, formed in 1885)
- Royal Park
- Scotch College
- University
- Wharehousemen
- Williamstown

Among clubs formed in the late-1860s/early 1870s were Regiment and Studley Park. Most of the other clubs formed during this era are mentioned below.

In 1861 the first moves towards the establishment of a roof body were seen when the Athletic Sports Committee presented a Challenge Cup for the champion Senior team, which was donated by the Royal Caledionian Society of Melbourne. The result was disputed in 1869, with both Carlton and Melbourne claiming the Cup. In the following year, Melbourne and South Yarra both claimed champion status. In 1870, South Yarra put up a new Challenge Cup for competition. A few years after the Challenge Cup was first presented, Junior teams were able to compete for a Junior Challenge Cup.

Prior to the actual establishment of an official football-only roof body in 1877, there was still a great degree of organisation and cooperation between the various clubs. Regular meetings were held between the secretaries of the clubs at which, inter alia, the following matters were discussed:
- changes and refinements to the rules;
- fixtures for each season;
- the naming of the Champion club at the end of each season.

These meetings would have also discussed the ratings of each club, which were by the early 1870s listed in the following categories:
* Senior clubs
* Junior clubs
* Minor clubs
* Country clubs
* School clubs.

Fixtures did not necessarily confine clubs to playing other teams with a similar rating but if, for example, a Senior club played a Junior club, the Junior club would be allowed to have a greater number of players on the field. Clubs did not only play against other Victorian clubs and games between interstate teams were surprisingly frequent, particularly for the days before the establishment of interstate railway links, when the most common way of travelling from Melbourne to, say, Sydney or Adelaide, was by sea.

In the mid/late-1870s an annual called The Footballer was published. The Footballer provides readers with an insight into the early days of the game. It includes the results of all matches and a full and comprehensive listing of all contemporary teams, Senior, Public School, Junior, Minor, Country and School Clubs. The listing for most clubs includes details of its uniform, officials, playground (sic), year of formation, number of members and, importantly, potted biographies of most players. (Note: A copy of the 2nd edition (1876) was sold for AUD$4,000by Charles Leski Auctions on 19 September 2013 [refer to Charles Leski Auctions' catalogue of their public auction No.430 and Charles Leski Auctions' list of prices realised.])

By the time of the publishing of its first edition in 1875, there were already believed to be 143 football clubs in Victoria. The following eight clubs as Senior Clubs: Albert Park, Carlton, Carlton Imperials, East Melbourne, Hotham, Melbourne, St Kilda, and University.

The following four clubs were listed as "Principal School Clubs": Church of England Grammar School, Hofwyl-House School, Scotch College, and Wesley.

There were as many as 33 junior clubs listed in the 1875 The Footballer, viz: Adeplhian, Abbotsford United, Albion Union, Alma, Brunswick, Carlton Rifles, Cambridge Union, Clifton, East St. Kilda (late Alpaca), Elwood, Esplanade, Essendon, Excelsior, Fawkner Park, Hawthorn, Hotham United, Jolimont, Richmond (no relation to the present club), Richmond Standard, Sands and McDougall, (Note: This would appear to have been Victoria's first works-based team, consisting of the employees of the well-known directory of the era(http://www.findmypast.com.au/content/melbourne-directory-sands)) St. Kilda Alma, South Melbourne, South Melbourne Imperial (late Stanley), South Park, Southern Rifles, Southern, Star of Richmond, Vaucluse, Victoria Parade, West Melbourne, West Melbourne, Williamstown, Windsor.

A list of 14 minor clubs then followed, proceeded by the names (but no details) of 51 clubs who "also play under the Victorian Rules of Football".

Thirteen Provincial clubs were then listed, followed by the names and details of six Geelong clubs. (Note: On 13 December 2007, Charles Leski Auctions, Melbourne, sold an 1864 Geelong membership ticket for A$3,000. This is one of the earliest extant football artifacts, from any code, that is still in private hands.) Apart from Geelong Football Club, the following provincial clubs that were later to be regarded by the VFA as Senior Clubs, were listed by The Footballer: A.

The final club list in The Footballer was 20 country clubs in the process of forming.

Events during the early- and mid-1870s rightly appeared to be leading towards the establishment of a roof body for football in Victoria. The need for an organisation with some control over clubs is illustrated by an anecdote from 1875: the East Melbourne v Williamstown game was cancelled when the East Melbourne players decided that they would rather watch the Carlton v Melbourne game.

== Formation of the VFA ==
The Victorian Football Association (VFA) was formed on 7 May 1877 by fourteen metropolitan and provincial clubsat Oliver's Cafe in Melbourne, which was just seven days after the SAFA (later SANFL), which formed on 30 April 1877. The establishment of a unique Australian rules football code occurred via the formation of the VFA.The VFA took over and controlled the Victorian Junior Football Association (VJFA), although the VJFA had its own administration. It had an initial membership of 10 senior clubs and a number of junior clubs, seven of which are listed below: Junior clubs did not mean underage, a club was classed as junior on it ability and experience. In the 1880s there were up to 300 junior clubs in Victoria. Some of these clubs were only social clubs who played a couple of games a year, other played weekly and had the desire to become a senior club. Country clubs played when they could as they did not get the half holidays as they did in the city. It was not uncommon for junior clubs to emerge or re-form under a different name.

SENIOR TEAMS	Notes	JUNIOR TEAMS	Notes
Albert Park		Ballarat	out of VFA within a few years but rejoined at a later date
Carlton		Hawthorn	out of VFA within a few years but rejoined at a later date
East Melbourne	out of VFA within a few years but rejoined at a later date	Northcote	out of VFA within a few years but rejoined at a later date
Essendon		Standard	out of VFA within a few years and did not rejoin
Geelong		Victoria United	out of VFA within a few years and did not rejoin
Hotham		Victorian Railways	out of VFA within a few years and did not rejoin
Melbourne		Williamstown	out of VFA within a few years but rejoined at a later date
St Kilda	out of VFA within a few years but rejoined at a later date		
South Melbourne			
West Melbourne	out of VFA within a few years but rejoined at a later date		

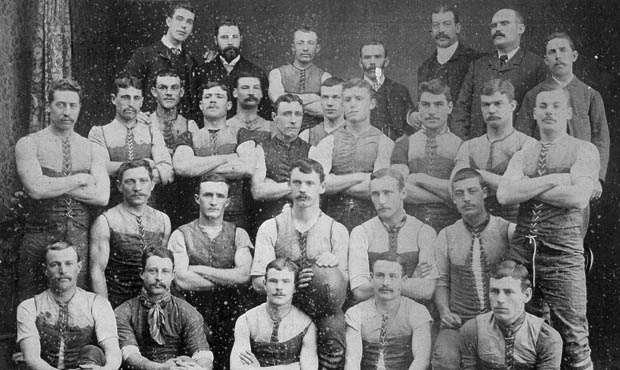
Carlton, VFA first premiers in 1877

In the early days, any club was eligible to join the VFA upon payment of an annual subscription. However, Senior clubs were mainly selected on merit but there were other criteria. For example, Senior clubs were required to have a minimum membership of 80.

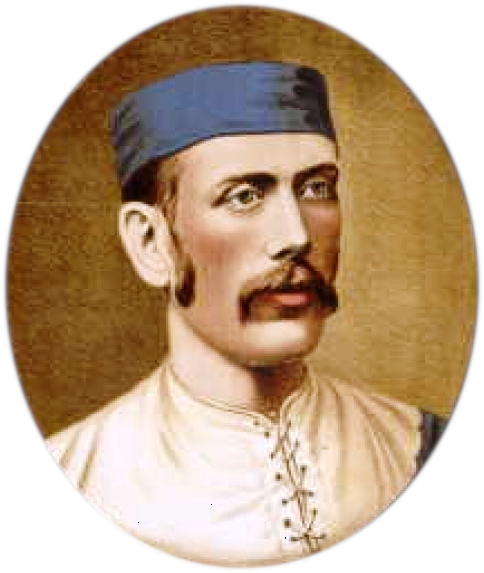
George Coulthard (1856–83) – Carlton

During the first decades, the VFA was not responsible for the setting of fixtures, which continued to be the province of meetings between the secretaries of the various clubs. However, by the late 1880s, a rule had been introduced that made any club that didn't play at least 18 games in a season, ineligible for the Premiership. As an example, in 1889 bottom club Footscray had only played 16 games. Finally, in 1891, the association set up a sub-committee under North Melbourne's W. R. Mullins which took on the responsibility of setting fixtures.

However, a lot of the other organisational work was now done by the VFA, from its inception, including the setting of rules and the naming of the premiers (or champion team). The number of players continued to vary according to the strength of the opposition, but if two equally ranked teams were pitted against each other, there were usually 20 players on each team.

From 1878, points were listed but only goals counted towards the score and, therefore, there were a great number of drawn games. Even though behinds did not count towards a result, in 1893 the VFA awarded the Stars and Stripes Trophy to the team kicking the fewest behinds in ratio to the number of goals scored in premiership matches. This was done to encourage accurate kicking for goal. Melbourne won the trophy with a percentage of 78.6, barely ahead of Williamstown at 78.5. The unusual trophy name comes from the fact that the trophy was awarded by Messrs Jacobs, Hart & Co., manufacturers of Stars and Stripes cigarettes.

Between 1873 and 1893 no fewer than six teams went through a season undefeated:

YEAR	TEAM	PLAYED	WON	DREW
1873	Carlton	13	6	7
1874	Carlton	17	12	5
1879	Geelong	17	16	1
1885	South Melbourne	25	22	3
1886	Geelong	27	24	3
1893	Essendon	18	16	2

South Melbourne was undefeated in 1886 until playing the undefeated Geelong in a special game to determine the premiership (see below: "The Game of the Century").

In 1877, Carlton became the first Victorian football team to play in New South Wales. They played two games against Waratah, winning one under Victorian rules and losing a rugby game.

In 1886 there were as many as 18 VFA clubs. The VFA decided to reduce the numbers and in 1888 they merged the Williamstown Football Club with the South Williamstown Football Club, merged the St Kilda Football Club with the original Prahran Football Club, and removed the three Ballarat clubs; Ballarat, Ballarat Imperials and South Ballarat (these clubs then became the base of a local Ballarat League). In 1889, the Melbourne Football Club and the original University Football Club were also merged.

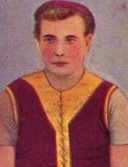
John "Jack" Worrall (1861–1937) – Fitzroy

By 1896, there were 13 teams in the VFA Senior competition. The ladder in that year was:

TEAM	WIN	LOSE	DRAW
Collingwood	14	3	1
South Melbourne	14	3	1
Essendon	14	4	-
Melbourne	12	6	-
Fitzroy	12	6	-
North Melbourne	8	9	1
Port Melbourne	7	8	3
Williamstown	7	8	3
St Kilda	6	11	1
Footscray	5	10	3
Geelong	4	11	3
Carlton	2	14	2
Richmond	3	15	-

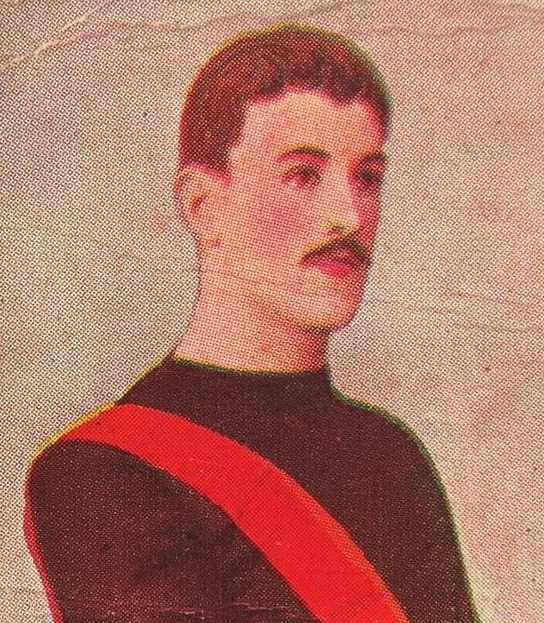
Albert Thurgood (1874–1927) – Essendon

A play-off was held at the East Melbourne Cricket Ground to determine the premiership: Collingwood 6.9 d. South Melbourne 5.10.

The VFA did not have regular finals during this period and the above table represents the situation at the end of what is now called the home-and-away matches.

In 1886 a rule change was introduced, with the two halves being replaced by four quarters of football, that is, three breaks of varying lengths.

Until 1886, the ball was thrown into the air to start a quarter but in 1887 the bounce, now a traditional part of Australian football, was introduced.

The supposed unpopularity of interstate games in the late 20th and early 21st centuries is reminiscent of the situation in the 1880s. The first intercolonial game was played in 1879 but similar games were hard to organise during the next few years. The following appeared in The Australasian on 22 July 1882: "Victoria versus South Australia. On account of a sufficient number of players not having intimated their desire to take part in the intercolonial matches against South Australia in Adelaide on the 5th, 7 and 12 August next, the match committee of the VFA had to postpone the selection of the team until 4.45 p.m. on Tuesday next. Players desirous of playing are requested to send their names to Messrs. Boyle and Scott before that time, and those selected will leave by steamer on the 29th inst. ..." None of the games took place.

== The match of the century ==
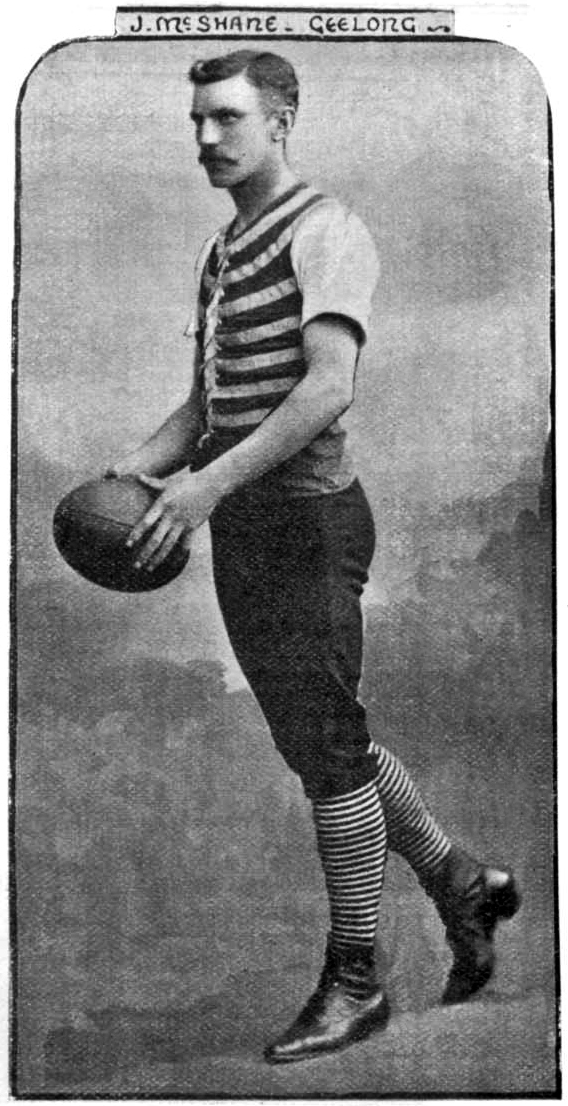
Jim McShane, one of the six McShane brothers to play for Geelong

Geelong v South Melbourne played on 4 September 1886 is, arguably, the most important Aussie Rules game to be played in the 19th century. Although regular final games had not yet been instituted, the VFA arranged this game so as to determine the Premiers for 1886; both teams had gone through the season undefeated. The strong contemporary records of both teams is shown above (The VFA's Top 19th Century Teams).

The game was held at South's Emerald Hill ground and a then-record crowd of 34,121 paid 6d (Note: In a straight conversion to decimal currency the admission was 5¢ for a total of $1,494.70. However, using the FitzHerbert Converter one is able to get a good estimate of the recent value. (The FitzHerbert Converter aims to convert the currency from all years from 1860 into 1988 Australian dollar values)) per head for a total revenue of £747/7/-. It was said that many more crowded into the ground without paying.

Two special trains brought the local team and two thousand supporters from Geelong. An attempt was made to wreck one of these trains by removing a section of rail, near Laverton – luckily the attempt was discovered and repaired. There were long lines of people and overcrowded Hansom cabs taking people from Melbourne to South Melbourne, prior to the game. After the game, thousands of people lined Clarendon Street, South Melbourne, to cheer the victorious Geelong on their way.

Geelong 4.19 defeated South Melbourne 1.5. (Note: In those days, points were recorded but did not count toward the score. However, whichever scoring method had been used, the result would have been the same.) At half-time Geelong was leading 1.12 to 0.3.

Geelong captain Dave Hickinbotham was one of the best players on the ground, even though he was up against William Bushby, reputed to be one of the finest players in Australia, and imported by South Melbourne from South Adelaide just for this game. (Note: There was no real system of registration of players in those days. There were also no transfer fees.) Other outstanding players were: Geelong – A. Boyd, Sam Boyd, J .J. Julien, Kearney, Kerley, Mc Lean and Phil McShane; (Note: Phil McShane was one of six McShane brothers playing for Geelong at that time. The McShane's still equal the record in senior football for the greatest number from a single family in the one team. (Six Tyson brothers played for Kalgoorlie in the late 19th and early 20th centuries. Two other Tyson relatives also played.)) South – Docherty, Henry Elms, Greaves, Harper, Hill, M. Minchin and H. Smith.

== Formation of the VFL ==
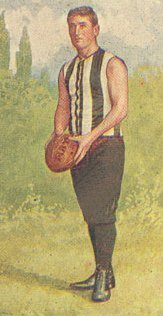
Edward M. "Ted" Rowell, c1877–c1967 – Collingwood 1902–14, 1915

From as early as the mid-1880s, a number of the Senior VFA clubs showed discontent with the unevenness of the competition, its unwieldiness and the VFA's perceived lack of desire to try and solve the problems. Geelong and Essendon, both of which were among the most successful teams, were at the forefront of the moves towards reform. In 1889 Geelong proposed a more streamlined break-away competition. In 1894, Geelong, Essendon, Melbourne and Fitzroy again planned a new organisation that would consist of the aforementioned four clubs, along with teams from Ballarat and Bendigo. Ironically, Collingwood also wanted to see reforms, even though it was, itself, a new club that had only been formed in 1892, mainly out of the Junior club, Britannia. The Collingwood plan was to reduce the number of teams by amalgamation (as had been done in 1888/89 [see above]). They proposed the following mergers which were basically geographically-based: Footscray and Williamstown; Carlton and Fitzroy; South Melbourne and Port Melbourne.

In 1896, Markwell the football writer for The Age noted that the VFA had not moved to try and stop the downfall of the game. He suggested that many of the rules would have to be changed and that boundary umpires should be introduced to help field umpires control on-field discipline. "Reform is urgently called for", he wrote. "Otherwise respectable young fellows will retire from the sport and leave it entirely in the hands of blackguards."

This unruliness among the players of certain teams and, more particularly, the thuggery of the supporters of some clubs, had been noted for a number of years and was certainly another reason that some clubs saw a break-away from the VFA as the only solution. Another contemporary writer called the Collingwood v North Melbourne game in July 1896: "the greatest disgrace of all time in Australian football". The game itself was a cleanly played affair, which was narrowly won by Collingwood. However, at half-time spectators attacked Umpire Roberts and did so again after the game. During the second attack, the players of both sides tried to protect the umpire only to have the crowd turn on them. Female spectators slashed away with long hat pins and one male supporter even produced an iron bar, which he used. Players McDougall (North Melbourne) and Bill Proudfoot (Collingwood) were knocked unconscious and most of their teammates suffered some injuries, albeit some minor. It is often claimed that this incident led to North Melbourne not being invited to join the VFL when it was formed later that year.

A few weeks later, on 22 August 1896, during a Footscray v Williamstown game, Williamstown walked off at three-quarter time, allegedly because of the rough play of Footscray. This was not the first time that such a thing had happened; in 1887, Richmond also left the ground at three-quarter time alleging rough play by Port Melbourne. This led to sustained rivalry between Port Melbourne and Richmond, which continued until Richmond's last VFA season, 1907.

On 2 October 1896, just after the end of the 1896 season, representatives from six clubs held a meeting at Buxton's Art Gallery in Collins Street, at which it was decided to form the VFL Victorian Football League, which would represent the stronger clubs and begin playing in the 1897 football season. The clubs with delegates at that meeting were: Collingwood; Essendon; Fitzroy; Geelong; Melbourne; South Melbourne. Although Geelong had finished 11th in a 13 team competition, they had consistently been calling for change. Their record as a top team in past years would have also ensured their place at the table.

Carlton and St Kilda were also invited to join the VFL, initially making it an eight team competition. St Kilda had never been a strength in the VFA but their excellent home ground was seen as being a bonus for the new VFL. Not only did the Junction Oval have a good playing surface, but it was easily accessible by public transport.

Carlton had not been a top team for a number of years but their dominance in the 1860s and 1870s meant that they still had one of the largest supporter bases. However, Carlton's admission to the VFL was contingent on them obtaining a suitable home ground. Since their formation in 1864 they had played at: Royal Park; Madeline Street oval (where Newman College, University of Melbourne now stands); the southern end of Princes Park; an area then known as the triangle (where University Women's College was later built). Carlton obtained permission to fence-in an area at the northern end of Princes Park and work commenced on clearing a rubbish tip from part of the site. (Note: Bringing Princes Park up to VFL standards took longer than expected and the first game was not played there until Round 7, on the public holiday for Queen Victoria's Diamond Jubilee (Tuesday 22 June). Later in the season, Carlton had a run of six home games when they played all the clubs that had earlier hosted Carlton's first six games.)

The VFL inaugural meeting was held just seven weeks after a special meeting of the VFA held at Young and Jackson Hotel on 6 August 1896 to discuss the 25 July affair (see above). This meeting closed the North Melbourne ground for four weeks, and insisted on better protection for umpires in the future.

In its first season the VFL introduced three important reforms to the game:
1. behinds were counted towards the score;
2. a finals system was introduced;
3. the 'little mark' was abolished.

The new scoring system saw six points given for a goal and one point for a behind. This system is still used. (Between 1878 and 1896, kicks between the kick off posts [behind posts] were recorded but did not count towards the score). The main advantage in the now long-established, present system is that it cuts down the number of draws [e.g. a score of 12.15 (87) against 12.9 (81) would have been a draw under the old system but a win to the first team under the current system]. However, the current system does reward inaccurate kicking [e.g. a score of 16.24 (120) against 18.10 (118) would see a win to the team that kicked the lesser number of goals]. The first game that would have been a draw under the old scoring method, but achieved a result under the new system was in Round 4 of 1897: South Melbourne 5.11 (41) d. Collingwood 5.3 (33). Later in that same season there were two games where the new system completely reversed the results, the first of these was in Round 12: Collingwood 3.17 (35) d. Fitzroy 4.4. (28). The advantage in the new system is highlighted by the fact that in 1896 the VFA had nine drawn games in one season, but there was only one draw in the VFL's 1897 season. (The greatest number of draws in any VFL/AFL season was five in 1921.)

In 1897, VFL finals were held after 14 home-and-away games in which each of the eight clubs had played each other twice. (Note: For a detailed history of the evolution and development of the finals system used by the Victorian Football League (VFL) and, later, by the Australian Football League (AFL) see AFL finals series and McIntyre system.) Those first finals consisted of six round-robin matches over three weeks, between the top four clubs. A finals ladder was drawn up which saw Essendon, which had finished in second place at the end of the home-and-away matches, clearly in first place with 3 wins, 0 losses. Had there not been a clear points winner to the finals ladder, a Grand Final would have been played between the two top-placed clubs. (Note: In 1924, a slightly modified version of the 1897 finals system was played because of dissatisfaction with the then-existing Argus system. The difference between the 1897 and 1924 finals was that in 1924 the team at the end of home-and-away matches had the right, if necessary, to challenge the winner of the finals ladder. The 1924 system was not successful but Essendon again won the Premiership, thus winning under similar systems in 1897 and 1924.)

After experimenting with another rather complicated finals system between 1898 and 1900, the VFL used what was later to be known as the "original Argus system" in 1901, and converting that into what became known as the "amended Argus system" 1902. Except for 1924 (see above), the "amended Argus system" operated continuously from 1902 to 1930 (the VFL adopted the Page–McIntyre system, a.k.a. the McIntyre final four system, in 1931).

Under the amended Argus system, the team that was first at the end of the home-and-away matches played third, and second played fourth, with the two winners meeting in a Final. However, the team heading the ladder at the end of home-and-away matches was given an advantage in that if it lost either its semi-final or the Final, it could challenge the Final winner in a Grand Final. (Note: The VFL used the Argus system until it was replaced by the Page-McIntryre system in 1931. The main advantage of this latter system is that it guarantees a Grand Final and ensures four weeks of finals. This system remained in use until the Final Four was replaced by a Final Five in 1972. Since then, variations on this system have been drawn up to cater for a Final Five, a Final Six and a Final Eight. The Page–McIntyre system was devised by K. G. McIntyre and sponsored through the VFL by Percy Page. Under the system, the following games were played: 1st SEMI-FINAL – 3rd v 4th – loser omitted; 2nd SEMI-FINAL – 1st v 2nd; PRELIMINARY FINAL – loser of 2nd Semi-final v winner of 1st Semi-final – loser omitted; GRAND FINAL – winner of 2nd Semi-final v winner of Preliminary Final. In other words, the advantage given to the top team under the Argus system is here given to both the 1st and 2nd teams at the end of the home-and-away games.) (Initially, the right to challenge only applied if the minor premiers had won more games than the winner of the final. This stipulation was always controversial and was dropped for the 1907 season.) The original Argus system was identical to the amended Argus system, except that with the original system, the minor premiers had no right of challenge whatsoever.

The importance of cricket over football is highlighted by the fact that between 1898 and 1901, the most prestigious ground, the MCG, was not used for finals because cricket pitches were being prepared.

A 'little mark' was taken when a player passed the ball by foot at least two yards (1.83 metres), generally from a pack of players. It was difficult for umpires to pick out 'little marks' in scrimmages. It was abolished in 1874 to help open up play.

The New South Wales Rugby League (NSWRL) was formed in Sydney in 1907/08 and the game was seen as being halfway between rugby union and Australian rules football. In 1908, there were serious talks between the NSWRL and the VFL which, it was hoped, would lead to some form of amalgamation or affiliation. Of course, this didn't happen and Rugby League's offside rule was seen as the major reason why the talks broke down.

The VFL continued to go from strength to strength. In the late 20th century it evolved into a national competition and is now known as the AFL Australian Football League.

== Reforms to the VFA ==
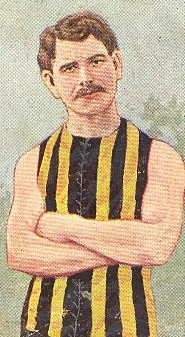
Richmond (VFA) centreman, Charlie Backhouse, who played over 200 games in a 15-year career 1891–1905; captain 1905.

Despite predictions of the demise of the VFA after the formation of the VFL, the earlier-formed competition continued for another 99 years, although the VFL immediately took its place as the senior Victorian competition. Nevertheless, under the wise presidency of Theodore Fink, the VFA continued to play a significant role.

In 1897, the VFA followed the VFL and also introduced two of their reforms: the counting of behinds towards the score; and the abolition of the 'little mark'. The VFA didn't introduce a finals system until 1903 when the Argus system was used. (The Page–McIntyre system was introduced in 1933, two years after the VFL had first used it.)

The following year, 1898, saw two more reforms to the VFA's rules: the number of players was reduced from 20 to 18; an order-off rule was introduced. The first change worked well as it gave players more freedom of movement around the field and also cut down the number of packs. The VFL also adopted this change a season later and has had 18 players on the field ever since 1899. However, the number of VFA on-field players has changed over the years: 1908 – to 17; 1912 – to 16; 1918 – reverted to 18; 1959 – to 16; 1992 – reverted to 18.

The order-off rule was not popular with players or umpires. Umpires were never sure how rough things had to get before they could order a player off, rather than awarding a free kick to an opponent. The order-off rule was dispensed with after two seasons. Even so, the order-off rule must be seen as an attempt by the VFA to curb the rough play that was cited as one of the reasons for the formation of the VFL.

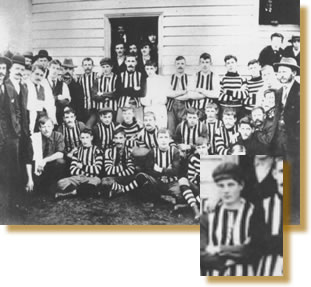
Brunswick during the early 20th century. The highlighted section in the bottom right-hand corner shows the future Australian Prime Minister John Curtin

In 1897, Brunswick was admitted to the Association bringing the number of teams up to six (Brunswick, Footscray, North Melbourne, Port Melbourne, Richmond and Williamstown) who each played each other three times for a total of 15 rounds. As in previous seasons the club at the top of the ladder at the end of these home-and-away rounds was declared the Premier.

During that 1898 season another change was made in that after 15 home-and-away matches, the four teams at the top of the ladder played an extra two games prior to the Premiership being awarded. This was not really a finals system and was only tried for one season.

The VFA continued to increase the number of teams: 1899 – eight teams through the addition of West Melbourne and a re-formed Prahran; 1900 – nine teams through the addition of Essendon Town (later Essendon Association); 1903 – 10 teams through the addition of Preston.

In the 20th century, the VFA was always Victoria's second most important football competition. However, it had a few golden eras, particularly the 1930s/40s and the 1970s.

== Home grounds of senior clubs ==
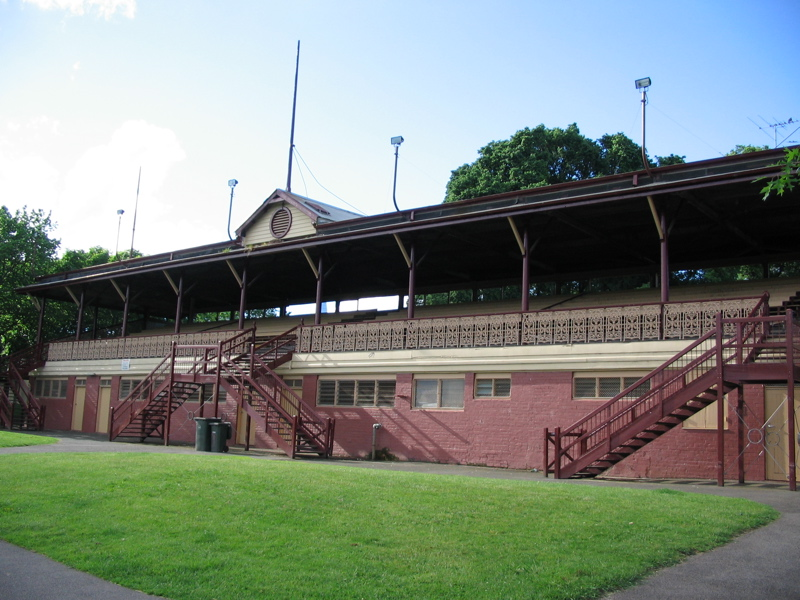
The grandstand at the Brunswick Street oval (now the W. T. Peterson Community Oval) home of the Fitzroy Football Club from its inception in 1883 until 1966. The grandstand was built in 1888 and is still standing.

In general, this list covers 19th century football grounds only but the final year of use is usually included, even if this was in the 20th or 21st century:

Albert Park
early 1870s–1876	Albert Park	played its last season as "Albert Park cum North Melbourne"
Brunswick
1865–1896		near the corner of Sydney & Glenlyon Rds
1897–1907	Parkville	land now occupied by the Ransford & McAlister ovals
Carlton
1864–	Madeleine Street oval	where Newman College now stands in Swanston Street North
?	southern end of Princes Park	
?	The Triangle	now the site of University Women's College
1897–2003	Princes Park (northern end)	first games not played until Round 6 of the 1897 season
Carlton Imperials
late 1860s–1876	Royal Park	
Collingwood
1892–1999	Victoria Park	Britannia had used the ground prior to Collingwood; 2000–2003: known as Jock McHale Stadium
East Melbourne
early 1870s–1881	East Melbourne Cricket Ground	(see above)
Essendon
1873–74?	McCracken's Paddock	at the McCracken's family home
1875?–81		near Newmarket railway station
1882–1921	East Melbourne Cricket Ground	(see above)
Essendon Association
1900–1921	Essendon Recreation Reserve	(Note: The club disbanded in 1921 after their ground was taken over by VFL club, Essendon)
Fitzroy
1883–1966	Brunswick Street oval	formerly the home of the Normanby Football club
Footscray
1875-early 1880s	Cowper Street paddock	
early 1880s–1885	Market Reserve	Barkly Street
1885–1997	Western Oval	1885 was also Footscray's first VFA season now known as Whitten Oval
Geelong
1859; 1878–1940	Corio Oval	At least one game is recorded as being played at Corio Cricket Ground in 1859 became Geelong's home ground in 1878 (Note: Corio Oval was taken over by the Australian Army in 1940 and they stayed there until the end of World War II. Geelong Football Club moved to Kardinia Park for the 1941 season and are still playing there. The Corio Oval site is now the Geelong Conference Centre.)
1860–77	Argyle Square	1860 was the first year in which Geelong is recorded as playing inter-club games

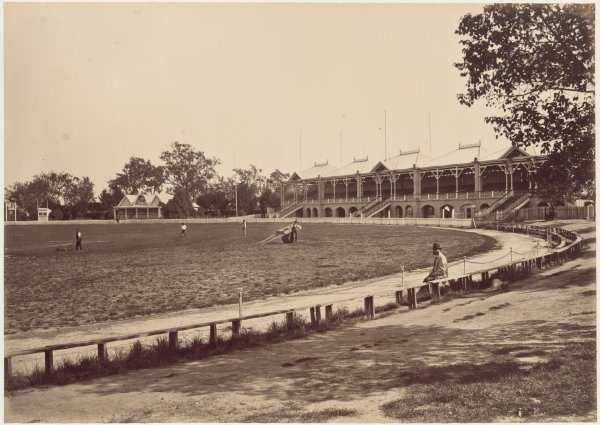
The MCG in 1878, a year after the first Test cricket match had been played there. By this time permission was being granted for the occasional football match to be played at the ground.

Melbourne
1859–84	Jolimont outside the MCG	Football was not permitted on the MCG in the early days because it was felt that it would damage the Cricket Club's turf pitches
1876–1941 & 1945–2017 & continuing	Melbourne Cricket Ground	The first football match permitted at the MGC was in 1876 (Melbourne Football Club v Metropolitan Police Force) but most games were still played outside the MGC itself. (Note: The US Airforce was given use of the MGC during World War II and Melbourne home games were played at the adjacent Punt Road Oval.) (Note: The MCG had a reversible stand which accommodated people facing inside to watch cricket or facing outside to watch football. It was burnt down in 1884, forcing Melbourne Football Club to play at the Friendly Societies Ground. However, by 1884, a few football games were being played on the MGC proper.)
1884	Friendly Societies Ground	later known as the Motordrome, now Olympic Park
North Melbourne/ Hotham
1869–75 & 1877–84	Royal Park (Note: The area of Royal Park where North Melbourne/Hotham games were played is near where Burke & Wills set off on their disastrous south-north exploration of Australia. It is believed that this is near to an area where junior football is still played. See above for a full history of the reasons for North Melbourne becoming Hotham and then becoming North Melbourne again.)	
1884–1964 & 1966–1985	Arden Street Oval (Note: Arden Street Oval was known colloquially as The Gasometer Oval because the adjoining gasworks dominated the skyline. Boxing, cricket, cycling, football and greyhound racing were all accommodated at Arden Street Oval at some stage. The greyhound betting ring was in a large tin shed behind the pavilion.)	North Melbourne played at Coburg for one season (1965) before returning to Arden Street.
Port Melbourne
1880–1941 & 1945–2017 & continuing	North Port oval	(Note: The VFA was in recess 1942–44 due to World War II and North Port oval was taken over by the US Army who, among other uses, used the Ingles Street wing to grow vegetables. The ground had to be top-dressed before football could again be played at North Port and, therefore, Port Melbourne played most of its 1945 home games at the Amateur Sports Ground (now Olympic Park).)
1945	Amateur Sports Ground	now Olympic Park most games played there but, later in the season, a few were played at North Port oval
Prahran
1886 1887	Warehousemen's Ground; St Kilda Road Wesley College Oval, St Kilda Road	1886 home ground – Warehouseman's now known as the Albert Ground; 1887 moved to Wesley College. At completion of 1887 season, the VFA forced Prahran to amalgamate with St Kilda
1893–1958 (Note: When the Prahran City Council tried to force Prahran to share Toorak Park with a Rugby Union team, they were expelled from the VFA for the 1959 season but were readmitted in the following year.); 1960–1994	Toorak Park	Hawksburn changed its name to Prahran immediately prior to moving to this ground (Note: Toorak Park was originally of a poor standard but ground improvements led to Prahran being invited to rejoin the VFA for the 1899 season.)
Richmond
1885–1964	Punt Road Oval	(Note: An earlier Richmond club was formed in 1860 with H. C. A. Harrison as one of its players. The present club dates from 1885.)
St Kilda
1873–1885	Alpaca Paddock	(Note: An earlier St Kilda club was formed in 1858 but not much is known about it. The present club dates from 1873. Alpaca Paddock was the area later used by the Prince Alfred Bowling Club and the St Kilda Primary School (ie. near the railway station). South American alpacas were bred in this area in the 1860s but the experiment was not economically viable.)
1886–1965	Junction Oval	
South Melbourne
1864–?	St Vincent Gardens (Note: In 1868 the club was referred to as "South Melbourne or Albert Park")	near the former Three Chain Road between Albert Park and Middle Park railway stations
1874–1943 & 1946–1981	Lakeside Oval	Now known as Bob Jane Stadium and configured for soccer Lakeside Oval was used by the Military during 1944 & 1945.
South Williamstown
1886–87	Port Gellibrand Oval/ Williamstown Cricket Ground	South Williamstown played two seasons in the VFA before merging with Williamstown
Warehousemen's
1870s	Warehousemen's Cricket Ground	Warehousemen's Cricket Club used this ground but its use by the Warehousemen's Football Club needs confirmation Ground still exists as the Albert Ground (St Kilda Road)
West Melbourne
1900–1907	Arden Street Oval	ground shared with North Melbourne, with whom West Melbourne amalgamated in 1907 in an unsuccessful attempt to join the VFL
Williamstown
1864?–1872	Market Place Reserve	on the site of the present Robertson Reserve
1872–87	Gardens Reserve	now known as Fearon Reserve
1888–2017 & continuing	Port Gellibrand Oval/ Williamstown Cricket Ground	began using the ground when the club amalgamated with South Williamstown

== Nicknames ==
From the earliest days of white settlement in Australia, the concept of using nicknames for people and organisations was widely adopted. Many of the 19th century football players had nicknames and most of the earliest clubs also quickly adopted a nickname; often based on the colour of the uniform, sometimes from the geographical location, or for a variety of other reasons. In earlier days, clubs often had more than one nickname, sometimes consecutively, but by the turn of the 20th century there was usually a greater stability with most clubs adopting one nickname by which they were known by both their own supporters and by the fans of opposing teams. By this time, many club followers were wearing badges, etc., which had a logo based on the nickname of their particular team.

TEAM	NICKNAME	Notes
Brunswick	The Pottery Workers	
Carlton	The Butchers	name coined in the early 1870s because of their tight-fitting blue dungaree jackets also ...
"	The Blues	still used – from the mid-1870s, players wore blue stockings imported from America (also attributed to 1871 captain, Jack Donovan, who wore a dark blue cap)
Collingwood	The Magpies	still used
Essendon	The Same Olds	after the last line in the chorus of an early club song, penned by a supporter: "We're always the same old Essendon" (used until as late as the 1920s) also ...
"	The Dons	still sometimes used – appears to have first been used in the 1900s (decade)
Essendon Town	The Dreadnoughts	a VFA club from 1900; later known as Essendon Association
Fitzroy	The Maroons	because of their distinctive Maroon canvas jerseys
Footscray	Prince Imperials	not really a nickname but the official name of the club that was to change its name to Footscray preparatory to joining the VFA in 1883 also ...
"	The Tricolours	still sometimes used also ...
"	'Scray	
Geelong	The Pivotonians	the port of Geelong was the pivot between the capital of Melbourne and the Ballarat goldfields also ...
"	The Seagulls	also ...
"	The All Whites	from 1872 to 1875, they wore an all-white uniform
Hawthorn	The Yellow and Blacks	after changing its name from Riversdale in 1889, this was the colour of the uniforms also ...
"	The Redlegs	from 1892 to 1901, they wore a red & blue jumper and red stockings also ...
"	The Mayblooms	the Hawthorn bush (also known as Crataegus) blooms in May
Melbourne	The Invincible Whites	from 1861, they wore an all-white uniform also ...
"	The Redlegs	still sometimes used – from the mid-1870s, players wore red stockings imported from America also ...
"	The Fuscias	a red cap worn concurrently with the red stockings gave birth to this name
Port Melbourne	The 'Boroughs	still used
Richmond	Richmondites	probably used in the late 1880s – appears not to have been popular also ...
"	The Wasps	presumably inspired by the black & yellow colours also ...
"	The Tigers	still used
St Kilda	The Seasiders	also ...
"	The Seagulls	also ...
"	The Saints	still used – appears to have been coined immediately after their readmission to the VFA in 1886.
South Melbourne	The Bloods	still occasionally used by successor club Sydney Swans, particularly when the club wants to highlight its Melbourne roots – then as now, their jersey featured red on white
University	The Students	an obvious nickname, even used in VFA days also ...
"	The Professors	ditto
Williamstown	The Villagers	also ...
"	'Town	

== See also ==
- Origins of Australian rules football
- History of Australian rules football
- Australian rules football
- Australian Football League
- Victorian Football Association
- List of Australian rules football clubs by date of establishment
- Australian rules football in Victoria

== Bibliography ==
- Atkinson, Graeme (1982). Everything You Ever Wanted to Know about Australian Rules Football ... The Five Mile Press, Melbourne. ISBN 0-86788-009-0.
- Blainey, Geoffrey (1990): A Game of Our Own, Information Australia, Melbourne. ISBN 0-949338-78-8.
- Caruso, Santo; Fiddian, Marc; Main, Jim: Football Grounds of Melbourne, 2002, Pennon Publishing, Melbourne. ISBN 1-877029-02-5.
- Fiddian, Marc (2003). Seagulls Over Williamstown. Williamstown Football Club, Melbourne.
- Hutchison, Garrie; Ross, John (1998). The Clubs. The Complete History of Every Club in the AFL/VFL. Penguin Books, Melbourne. ISBN 0-85550-482-X.
- Mancini, Anne; Hibbins, Gillian (1987). Running With the Ball. Melbourne: Lynedoch Publications. ISBN 0-7316-0481-4.
- Murray, John (editor) [various authors]: Melbourne Football Club – Since 1858 – An Illustrated History, 2008, GSP Books, Melbourne.
- Power, Thomas P. (1875). The Footballer. Melbourne: Henriques and Co.
- Rodgers, Stephen (1983). Tooheys Guide to Every Game Ever Played. Melbourne: Lloyd O'Neil Pty Ltd. ISBN 0-670-87858-8.
