= 1877 Geelong Football Club season =

Geelong Football Club
1877 season
- Home ground: Argyle Square Ground
- VFA season: Did not place

The 1877 season was the first in which Geelong participated in the newly established Victorian Football Association. Geelong did not have a captain this season nor did they have a best and fairest. No data is available as to who scored the most goals. Geelong did not play enough matches to place on the ladder.

== Season summary ==
Geelong mainly played matches against local teams this season with only three matches against senior clubs. Of those matches, Geelong won one match and lost two matches. Geelong played twice against Geelong Imperial winning one match and drawing the other. Geelong also played matches against Camperdown and Colac, and Victorian Railways, winning both of these matches.

=== Results ===
Key
H	Home game
A	Away game

Table of season results
Match	Date	Result	Score			Opponent	Score			Ground		Attendance	Ladder	Report
Match	Date	Result	G	B	T	Opponent	G	B	T	Ground		Attendance	Ladder	Report
1	24 May	Lost	1	*	1	Melbourne	3	*	3	Argyle Square Ground	H	-	—	Report
2	2 June	Won	3	11	3	Geelong Imperial	0	2	0	Argyle Square Ground	H	-	—	Report
3	9 June	Won	1	19	1	Ballarat	0	5	0	Argyle Square Ground	H	-	—	Report
4	7 July	Drawn	1	*	1	Geelong Imperial	1	*	1	Common Reserve	A	-	—	Report
5	14 July	Won	2	*	2	St Kilda	0	*	0	Argyle Square Ground	H	-	—	Report
6	28 July	Lost	0	*	0	Carlton	2	*	2	Madeline Street Ground	A	-	—	Report
7	8 September	Won	11	*	11	Camperdown and Colac	0	*	0	Argyle Square Ground	H	-	—	Report
8	15 September	Won	4	*	4	Victorian Railways	0	*	0	Argyle Square Ground	H	-	—	Report
