= 1878 Geelong Football Club season =

Geelong Football Club
1878 season
- Home ground: Corio Oval
- VFA season: Premiers

The 1878 season was the second in which Geelong competed in the Victorian Football Association. Geelong finished the season as premiers despite only playing four matches against other senior opponents. Geelong finished the season by winning a play-off against the best metropolitan club, Melbourne. The result was five goals to one, winning the premiership.

== Season summary ==
=== Results ===
Key
H	Home game
A	Away game
PO	Play-off

Table of season results
Match	Date	Result	Score			Opponent	Score			Ground		Attendance	Ladder	Report
Match	Date	Result	G	B	T	Opponent	G	B	T	Ground		Attendance	Ladder	Report
1	17 May	Won	3	*	3	University	1	*	1	Argyle Square Ground	H	-	—	Report
2	24 May	Won	2	18	2	West Melbourne	0	3	0	Corio Oval	H	-	—	Report
3	1 June	Won	2	*	2	Geelong Schools	1	*	1	Argyle Square Ground	H	-	—	Report
4	22 June	Won	11	31	11	Warrigal (NSW)	0	*	0	Argyle Square Ground	H	-	—	Report
5	29 June	Won	2	16	2	Barwon	1	6	1	Corio Oval	H	-	—	Report
6	6 July	Won	6	*	6	Williamstown	0	*	0	Argyle Square Ground	H	-	—	Report
7	13 July	Won	7	*	7	Ballarat	3	*	3	Royal Saxon Paddock	A	-	—	Report
8	20 July	Won	4	*	4	South Melbourne	0	*	0	Argyle Square Ground	H	-	—	Report
9	27 July	Won	2	18	2	Hotham	1	5	1	Argyle Square Ground	H	-	—	Report
10	3 August	Drawn	0	*	0	Barwon	0	*	0	Corio Oval	H	-	—	Report
11	21 August	Won	6	26	6	Victorian (SA)	0	0	0	Corio Oval	H	-	—	Report
12	31 August	Won	7	27	7	Toorak	2	6	2	Argyle Square Ground	H	-	—	Report
13	7 September	Won	9	23	9	Ballarat	0	2	0	Corio Oval	H	-	—	Report
14	14 September	Won	3	16	3	Carlton	1	3	1	Corio Oval	H	-	—	Report
15	21 September	Won	2	25	2	Chilwell	1	3	1	Corio Oval	A	-	—	Report
16	28 September	Won	4	18	4	Barwon	0	1	0	Communn-na-Feinne	A	-	—	Report
PO	5 October	Won	5	12	5	Melbourne	0	3	0	Melbourne Cricket Ground	A	-	—	Report

=== Table ===
1878 VFA Results
		Senior Results				Total Results					
	TEAM	P	W	L	D	P	W	L	D	GF	GA
1	Geelong (P)	4	4	0	0	17	16	0	1	75	11
2	Melbourne	16	6	5	5	23	11	7	5	34	30
3	Carlton	13	8	5	0	24	17	6	1	69	23
	Hotham	10	4	4	2	19	9	4	3	20	8
	Essendon	10	3	3	4	18	8	3	7	28	11
	West Melbourne	10	2	5	3	18	6	5	7	18	12
	Albert-park	13	2	5	6	17	5	6	6	12	18
	St Kilda	6	1	3	2	11	2	6	3	6	30
Key: P = Played, W = Won, L = Lost, D = Drawn, GF = Goals For, GA = Goals Against, (P) = Premiers										Source:	
