= 1873 Victorian football season =

4th senior season of Australian rules football in Victoria

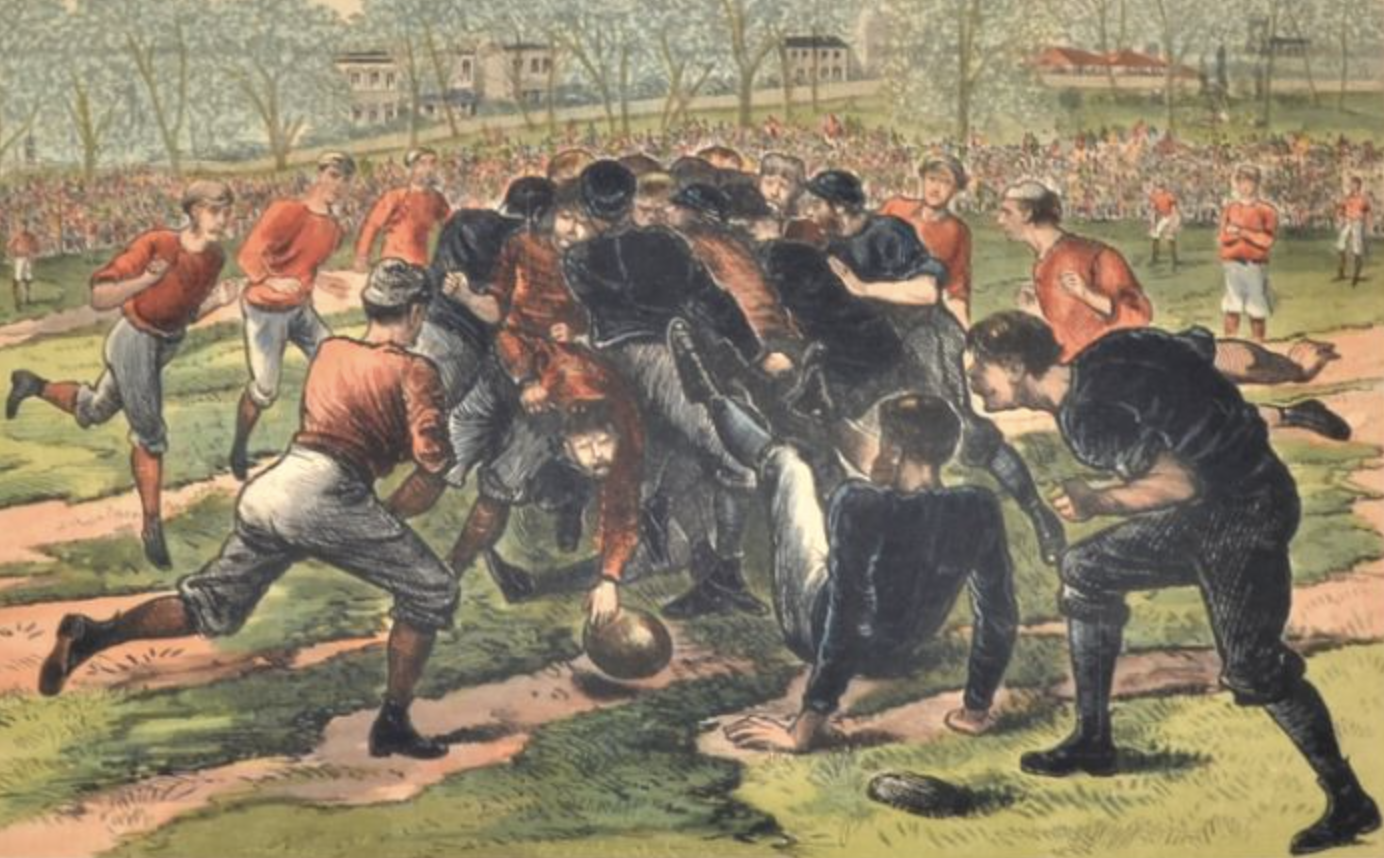
- A match between Carlton and Melbourne
- Senior teams: 5
- Premiers: Carlton; 2nd premiership

The 1873 Victorian football season was the fourth senior season of Australian rules football in the colony of Victoria. Carlton was the premier club for the second time.

== Clubs ==
A number of football clubs were formed in Victoria in for the 1873 season, including St Kilda, which was officially established on 2 April 1873.

=== New clubs ===
Club	Region	Ref
Maldon	Provincial	
St Kilda	Metropolitan	

== Metropolitan ==
Four metropolitan clubs participated in senior football during the 1873 season: Albert Park, Carlton, Melbourne and University, although University played too few games and its record is not shown below.

Notable for its absence was South Yarra, which folded in July 1873 after being a powerhouse of the 1860s. Many of its players went to the newly-established and nearby St Kilda Football Club, which was elevated to senior ranks in 1874.

Carlton and Melbourne were considered the dominant clubs in the city, so the premier club was decided based entirely on the head-to-head record between the clubs. In their four meetings, Carlton won two matches and the other two were drawn, meaning Carlton was recognised as the season's premier club.

=== Club records ===
The below table shows the results for senior clubs during the 1873 season across all matches (senior, junior, and at odds), excluding abandoned matches played by Carlton against Albert Park and University.

Geelong was the strongest provincial team, being undefeated in provincial matches and suffering its only loss of the season against Melbourne. According to the official tables published in The Argus from 1889 and in the Football Record from 1912 to 1923, Geelong was the third-placed club in the Victorian premiership in 1873.

Pos	Team	Pld	W	L	D	GF	GA
1	Carlton (P)	12	5	0	7	12	6
2	Melbourne	16	9	2	5	20	6
–	Albert Park	11	4	4	3		

(P) Premiers

== Juniors ==
Of the 12 junior clubs that competed at a relatively even standard – Carlton Imperial, Collingwood, East Melbourne, Essendon, Hawthorn, North Melbourne, Richmond, St Kilda, Southern, South Park, Studley Park and Williamstown – none managed an unbeaten record in matches against the other juniors. The numbers advantage to juniors clubs in matches at odds against senior clubs was reduced in 1873, with the junior club usually fielding 20 men to the senior club's 18.

It has been rumoured that bushranger Ned Kelly played 11 games for Williamstown during the 1873 season. The claim was supported by Williamstown's longest-servving club president, Trevor Monti, who said in 2014 that Kelly was on track to win the club's best and fairest before he was reported for headbutting an umpire in his last game. The claim has been disputed, as Kelly was only known to be in the Williamstown area for six months in 1873 as a prisoner. In 1928, the club discovered a prototype of the armour that Kelly later used during his last stand in 1880.

=== Club records ===
Although there was no clear premier junior club for the 1873 season, a rough ladder includes North Melbourne and Southern as some of the best-performing teams.

Pos	Team	Pld	W	L	D	GF	GA
1	North Melbourne	14	7	1	6		
2	Southern	18	10	3	5	10	6
3	Carlton Imperial						
4	St Kilda	14	9	3	2	18	3
5	Richmond						
6	East Melbourne						
7	Essendon						
8	Studley Park						
9	South Park						
10	Williamstown						
11	Collingwood						
12	Hawthorn	15	0	5	10	3	24

(P) Premiers

== Notable events ==
- From 1873, clubs began wearing distinctive uniforms to assist in distinguishing between the two teams. Prior to 1873, the colour of the players' caps was usually the only distinguishing feature.
- The sole match between Carlton and Albert-park was abandoned when Carlton disputed the umpire's decision to award a mark to Albert-park in front of goal. Albert-park refused to play another match against Carlton during the year following the incident.
