= 1877 St Kilda Football Club season =

1st St Kilda Football Club season

St Kilda Football Club
1877 season
- Home ground: Alpaca Paddock
- VFA: 5th

The 1877 St Kilda Football Club season was the inaugural season in the club's history competing in the 1877 VFA season.

== Background ==
The 1877 Victorian Football Association season was the first in which the Australian rules football competition in Victoria was run under a properly constituted administrative body; which was formed with the view to governing the sport via a collective body, made up of delegates representing the clubs.

The association was made up of five inaugural metropolitan senior clubs (St Kilda being one of them), and a number of provincial senior teams from across the state.

== VFA season ==
=== League table ===
The VFA did not officially endorse a system of ranking the clubs until the 1888 season.

1877 VFA Results
	TEAM	P	W	L	D	GF	GA
1	Carlton (P)	21	14	3	4	56	11
2	Melbourne	23	16	3	4	47	21
3	Hotham	14	7	5	2	27	16
4	Albert Park	12	5	4	3	17	10
5	St Kilda	17	5	7	5	25	35
Key: P = Played, W = Won, L = Lost, D = Drawn, GF = Goals For, GA = Goals Against, (P) = Premiers						Source:	

=== Matches ===
Only matches not played at odds between the affiliated senior metropolitan and provincial clubs are listed. Matches were also played in halves, not quarters.

2 2 June 1877	St Kilda	1–1	Albert Park	Alpaca Paddock, St Kilda
	1; 1	Summary	1; 1

6 30 June 1877	St Kilda	0–4	Melbourne	Alpaca Paddock, St Kilda
	0; 0	Summary	0; 4	Attendance: 700

9 14 July 1877	Geelong	2–0	St Kilda	Argyle Square Ground, Geelong
	2; 2	Summary	0; 0	Attendance: 1,500

10 21 July 1877	St Kilda	0–7	Carlton	Alpaca Paddock, St Kilda
		Summary

17 8 September 1877	Carlton	3–0	St Kilda	Madeline Street Reserve, Carlton
	3; 3	Summary	0; 0

19 22 September 1877	Melbourne	6–0	St Kilda	Melbourne Football Ground, Richmond
	2; 6	Summary	0; 0	Attendance: 2,000
