= 1874 Victorian football season =

5th senior season of Australian rules football in Victoria

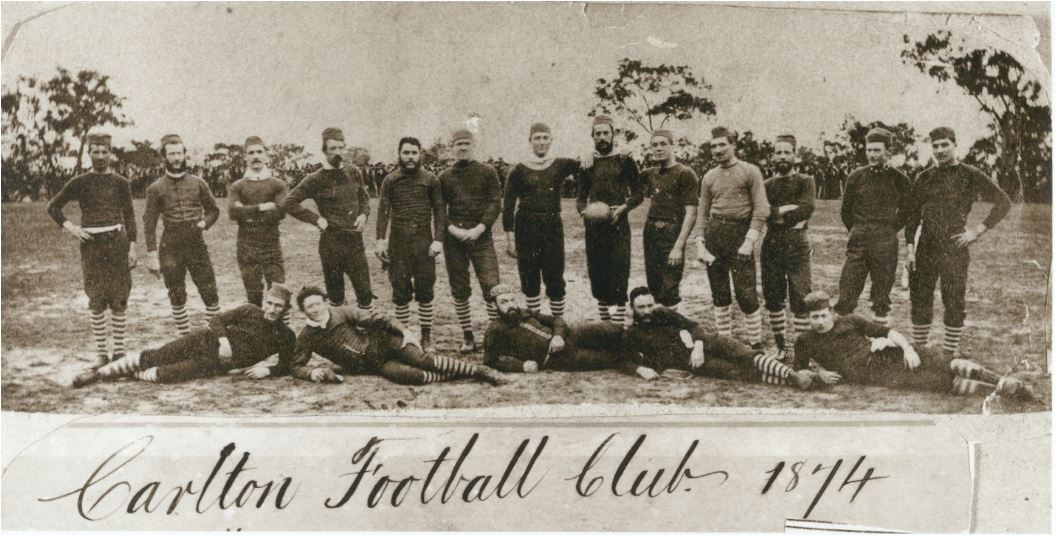
- Carlton – 1874 Victorian premiers
- Senior teams: 5
- Premiers: Carlton; 3rd premiership

The 1874 Victorian football season was the fifth senior season of Australian rules football in the colony of Victoria. Carlton was the premier club for the third time.

== Clubs ==
A number of football clubs were formed in Victoria for the 1874 season, including South Melbourne, which was incorporated on 19 June 1874. It was first known as "Cecil Football Club", but adopted the name "South Melbourne Football Club" four weeks later on 15 July.

=== New clubs ===
| Club | Region | Ref |
|---|---|---|
| Belmont | Provincial | |
| Braybrook | Metropolitan | |
| Port Melbourne | Metropolitan | |
| Rochester | Provincial | |
| South Melbourne | Metropolitan | |
| Stawell | Provincial | |
| Portarlington | Provincial | |
| West Melbourne | Metropolitan | |
| Wunghnu | Provincial | |

== Metropolitan ==
Five metropolitan clubs participated in senior football during the 1874 season: Albert Park, Carlton, Melbourne, North Melbourne and St Kilda. North Melbourne and St Kilda were newly elevated from junior ranks to senior ranks for this season, while University – which was a senior club in 1873 but only played a minimal number of games – instead played in the Second Twenty competition.

Carlton, which was undefeated during the season, was considered the premier club, with Melbourne runners-up, mostly by virtue of Carlton winning all four matches it played against Melbourne during the season. Melbourne had a slightly better record against the remaining senior clubs (Melbourne having a record of 6-1-1 to Carlton's record of 5-0-5), but such was Carlton's and Melbourne's dominance at the time that their matches against the other clubs had little influence on the premiership.

=== Club records ===
The below table is set of results for senior clubs during the 1874 season across all matches, including those against senior, junior and intercolonial clubs.

The Australasian and The Leader newspapers indicated Albert-park was the third best club, with North Melbourne fourth and St Kilda fifth. Although North Melbourne's win–loss record appears superior to Albert-park's, its easier fixture (four of its 12 matches were played against junior teams) was taken into account.

Tables published in The Argus from 1889 and in the Football Record from 1912 to 1923 listed St Kilda as the third-placed club in 1874, but contemporary sources dispute this.

| Pos | Team | Pld | W | L | D | GF | GA |
|---|---|---|---|---|---|---|---|
| 1 | Carlton (P) | 18 | 12 | 0 | 6 | 33 | 6 |
| 2 | Melbourne | 18 | 12 | 5 | 1 | 35 | 10 |
| 3 | Albert Park | 19 | 7 | 6 | 6 | 17 | 13 |
| – | North Melbourne | 12 | 7 | 2 | 3 | 11 | 4 |
| – | St Kilda | 18 | 2 | 8 | 8 | 8 | 27 |

(P) Premiers

== Provincial ==
Geelong was the best performing provincial team of the 1874 season. It was undefeated in provincial matches, and it held the newly established Western District Challenge Cup throughout the season, but lost three matches against metropolitan clubs. Some sources from 1874 place Geelong in fourth (across all matches) or fifth (only matches against senior clubs) out of six clubs.

Other known provincial teams in 1874 include Barwon, Kardinia, and Phoenix Foundry.

== Juniors ==
East Melbourne was the best performing junior club in 1874, winning nine of its 18 matches.

=== Club records ===
| Pos | Team | Pld | W | L | D | GF | GA |
|---|---|---|---|---|---|---|---|
| 1 | East Melbourne (P) | 18 | 9 | | | | |
| 2 | Richmond | | | | | | |
| 3 | Carlton Imperial | | | | | | |
| 4 | Hawthorn | 17 | 5 | 6 | 6 | 12 | 14 |
| 5 | Essendon | | | | | | |

(P) Premiers
