= Kerley =

Kerley is a surname. Notable people with the surname include:

- A. James Kerley, American academic, and the current President of Gulf Coast Community College
- David Kerley (born 1957), American journalist, correspondent for ABC News
- Don Kerley (1917–1996), Australian rules footballer
- Ellis R. Kerley (1924–1998), American anthropologist, and pioneer in the field of Forensic anthropology
- Fred Kerley (born 1995), American track and field athlete
- Harry Kerley (1894–1987), Australian rules footballer
- Jack Kerley, American author
- James Kerley, Australian TV and radio presenter
- Jeremy Kerley (born 1988), American footballer
- Neil Kerley (1934–2022), former Australian rules football player and coach
- Peter Kerley CVO (1900–1979), radiologist
- Stephen Kerley (born 1953), former Australian rules footballer

== See also ==
- Kerley lines, sign seen on chest radiographs with interstitial pulmonary edema
- Kerley's Harbour, Newfoundland and Labrador, small place southwest of Catalina
- The Dave & Kerley Show, Australian television series
