= Dave Duff =

Australian rules footballer, born 1901

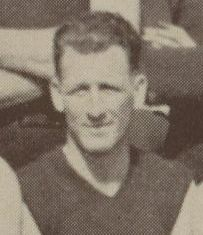

Personal information
- Full name: David E. Duff
- Born: 15 June 1901
- Died: 31 December 1977 (aged 76)
- Original team: Murrayville
- Height: 175 cm (5 ft 9 in)
- Weight: 73 kg (161 lb)
- Position: Full-forward

Playing career^{1}
Years	Club	Games (Goals)
1926	Melbourne	11 (26)
- ^{1} Playing statistics correct to the end of 1926.

David E. Duff (15 June 1901 – 31 December 1977) was an Australian rules footballer who played with Melbourne in the Victorian Football League (VFL).

Although he spent just one season at Melbourne, Duff was a member of a premiership team. He kicked a season best seven goals against Hawthorn at Glenferrie Oval in round 18 and continued his form in the finals with three goals in both the semi-final and preliminary final wins. In the 1926 VFL Grand Final he was Melbourne's full-forward and managed two goals.

Duff then became a prolific goal-kicker for Ballarat and in 1927, his first year, set a Ballarat Football League record tally of 113 goals. The record remained until 1953, when surpassed by Redan forward Bill Wells. He also topped the league's goal-kicking in 1928 and 1929.
