= Charlie Oliver (Australian footballer) =

Australian rules footballer

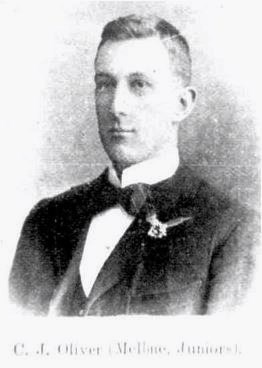
- Oliver in 1899

Personal information
- Full name: Charles Joseph Oliver
- Born: 9 September 1874; Sofala, New South Wales
- Died: 29 December 1917 (aged 43); Melbourne
- Original team: Carlton Imperial
- Position: Centre half-forward

Playing career^{1}
Years	Club	Games (Goals)
1900	Carlton	1 (1)
- ^{1} Playing statistics correct to the end of 1900.

Charles Joseph Oliver (9 September 1874 – 29 December 1917) was an Australian rules footballer who played with Carlton in the Victorian Football League (VFL). A medical practitioner, he enlisted in the First AIF, and died while in service.

== Family ==
The son of Robert Oliver and Emily Ann Oliver, née Parkinson, Charles Joseph Oliver was born at Sofala, near Bathurst, in New South Wales, on 9 September 1874.

He married Ellen Frances Mahony (1870–1917) in 1905. They had two children, Norman Joseph Oliver (1906–), and Charles Patrick Oliver (1909–1956).

== Education ==
He commenced his medical studies at the University of Melbourne in 1892.

== Football ==
=== Carlton Imperials ===
Oliver played his early football at Carlton Imperials.

=== Carlton (VFL) ===
He played just one VFL game for Carlton, against Melbourne at the MCG, on 7 July 1900 (round 10).

Selected at centre half-forward to play against Melbourne's exceptional centre half-back Jack Purse, and replacing Carlton's regular centre half-forward Bill McNamara (in the one game that McNamara did not play for the 1900 season), Oliver kicked one goal in a soundly beaten team: Melbourne 9.14 (68) to Carlton's 5.3 (33).

== Medical Practitioner ==
He was a qualified medical practitioner, having been awarded his Medicinae Baccalaureus et Baccalaureus Chirurgiae (M.B. et Ch.B.) from Melbourne University, in absentia, in March 1903, and having been entered into the Victorian medical register on 2 October 1903.

In 1905/1907 he was serving as the health officer for the Shire of Kerang at Quambatook in northern Victoria; and in the Shire of Berwick in 1912. At the time of his enlistment he was practising in Jeparit in Western Victoria.

== Military service ==
He served with the Australian Army Medical Corps in World War I.

== Death ==
Oliver was on his way back to the army camp in Seymour on 27 December 1917 when he was thrown off a shying horse.

He had never ridden the horse before; and, distressed by having to wait far too long for motor transport, he had borrowed the strange horse in his eagerness to return to camp. It seems that some of the difficulty he had controlling the shying horse may have been due to not adjusting the length of the saddle's stirrups to suit his leg length: see the full account provided by the investigation into his death at pp. 44–51 of his Service record.

He died of a cerebral haemorrhage two days later at the Base Military Hospital in Melbourne (just 12 weeks after his wife's death).

He was given a military funeral, and was buried at the Williamstown General Cemetery. Although he clearly died whilst serving in the First AIF, and although he received a military funeral, (for some unexplained reason) he is not listed on the Australian War Memorial's Roll of Honour.

== See also ==
- List of Victorian Football League players who died on active service
