= Don Discher =

Australian rules footballer

Personal information
- Full name: Don G. Discher
- Born: 17 April 1954 (age 72)
- Original team: Ballarat
- Height: 196 cm (6 ft 5 in)
- Weight: 96 kg (212 lb)
- Position: Ruckman

Playing career^{1}
Years	Club	Games (Goals)
1978–1979	St Kilda	12 (8)
- ^{1} Playing statistics correct to the end of 1979.

Don Discher (born 17 April 1954) is a former Australian rules footballer who played with St Kilda in the Victorian Football League (VFL).

Discher was a ruckman, who came down to St Kilda from Ballarat. He played his first league game in the opening round of the 1978 VFL season, against Fitzroy, but didn't feature again for the rest of the year.

He missed four games through suspension in 1979, two each for striking Collingwood's Peter Moore and Terry Wight. Despite this he was still able to appear in 11 games for St Kilda in 1979.

In the 1980s he continued to excel in the Ballarat Football League, winning his second Henderson Medal in 1985, having previously won one in 1977. He also captained the league in the Winfield Country Championship.
