= Robbie Muir (footballer) =

Australian rules footballer, born 1953

Personal information
- Full name: Robert Muir
- Original team: Ballarat (BFL)
- Height: 185 cm (6 ft 1 in)
- Weight: 89 kg (196 lb)

Playing career^{1}
| Years | Club | Games (Goals) |
| 1974–78; 1980; 1984 | St Kilda | 68 (23) |
- ^{1} Playing statistics correct to the end of 1984.

Robert Muir is an Aboriginal former Australian rules football player for the St Kilda Football Club in the Victorian Football League (VFL). He also played for West Torrens Football Club and Woodville Football Club in the South Australian National Football League (SANFL).

Recruited from Ballarat Football Club in the Ballarat Football League (BFL), Muir played 68 VFL games over 7 interrupted seasons between 1974 and 1984 and is regarded as a brilliant player who was notorious for angry outbursts on the field, often in response to vicious racial abuse by both opposition fans and on-field players.

Muir was reported 13 times and suspended for 22 weeks, including 12 weeks after a fiery outburst against Carlton in 1984. Such outbursts led to him being known by the nickname "Mad Dog", a name which Muir himself did not like.

== Early life ==
Muir's family were Yorta Yorta people from the Cummeragunja mission on the Murray River near Moama although Muir grew up in Ballarat. Muir's mother Myrtle raised and fostered over 43 children and Muir states there were never fewer than 11 people living in the family house. Muir's father, Cyril, was a painter and at times, a violent drunk. Cyril routinely physically abused Muir; one instance saw Cyril kicking Muir in the stomach so hard it left Muir with a twisted bowel that caused him continence problems throughout his football career. The abuse left Muir with lasting mental health issues which saw him given electroconvulsive therapy aged seven.

Muir attended Ballarat Technical School until the age of 15. After leaving school Muir worked as a slaughterman. He played his junior football for Ballarat Football Club and captained their under-18 team. A brilliant football talent, Muir was subject to continuous degrading racial taunts as a junior; so awful that an opposition fan wrote to the Ballarat Courier decrying the "filth and abuse" to which Muir was subjected. Ballarat's senior coach at the time and former North Melbourne player, Len Templar, said Muir was "as brilliant a player off nothing as I've ever seen".

Muir first became a father aged around 16 or 17. His daughter was adopted out against his will - Muir claims she was stolen. While reacting angrily to news of the adoption, Muir accidentally shot himself. Muir did not meet his daughter until she was 18.

In 1971, while playing for Ballarat against Redan, Muir was reported for kicking his opponent. Muir claimed it was an impulsive trip rather than a kick and his opponent whom he was alleged to have kicked supported him. However, evidence from the umpires asserted it was a "deliberate, vicious kick". Muir was suspended by Ballarat Football League officials for two and a half years. Ballarat Football Club took the league to the Supreme Court of Victoria but were unsuccessful in having the suspension overturned; the club alleged racial bias and collusion. During this enforced break from organised football, Muir played football for Aboriginal representative teams including a tour to Papua New Guinea in 1973 under the guidance of Sir Doug Nicholls who was also from the Cummeragunja Mission. Muir also started abusing alcohol and found himself in trouble with the police for various offences relating to his alcohol abuse including assault and drink-driving.

At the end of his suspension in 1974, Muir returned to play for Ballarat and on the strength of seven "astonishing" games for the club, he was recruited by St Kilda mid-season.

== VFL and SANFL career ==
Muir played 50 VFL senior games by early 1977, mainly under the coaching of Allan Jeans, winning St Kilda's most improved player award in 1975, but would only play another 18 games over the next four seasons.

Muir's ability as a footballer was confirmed by Ron Barassi who described him as one of the VFL's most talented players. Len Templar said "There was no better player than Muir. ... He could have done anything". Neil Roberts, who Muir reveres for his friendship, said "He's not a fellow, he's a happening". St Kilda's official history says "[Muir] played football with a cyclonic power that was allied to one-touch skills".

Muir was given the nickname "Mad Dog" by team-mate Kevin Neale who thought Muir ran around the field "like a sheep dog ... mad". The name stuck and later became associated with the numerous acts of on-field violence perpetrated by Muir. Muir would later disavow the name saying "... the blackfella thing came into it. It was terrible" and "I don't want people to say, 'There goes Mad Dog.'" Former AFL coach John Northey, who mentored Muir in Ballarat, was very critical of the name, saying "I think Robert is more maligned than any player who's ever played the game. I think it put him in positions he shouldn't have been in".

Muir's time at St Kilda was marred by constant racial abuse from opposition players and supporters and a lack of understanding of his predicament from his own club. Muir himself said "I just answered (racism) probably the wrong way and belt them back ... They wouldn’t say it the next game so you'd shut them down that way. [...] We didn’t have vilification rules, no lawyers, counsellors, didn’t have that. You're basically just left on your own, to your own devices."

Towards the end of his first spell at St Kilda in 1978, Muir was reported for kicking his opponent in a reserves game against South Melbourne for which he received an eight-week suspension. In defending him at the tribunal, his advocate relied on racial stereotypes - to the disgust of Muir. Muir transferred to West Torrens Football Club in the South Australian National Football League (SANFL) for the 1979 SANFL season. While at West Torrens, Muir was suspended for four matches for striking North Adelaide captain Barry Stringer and was acquitted of a charge of striking an umpire.

Muir returning to St Kilda in 1980. Later that season, in a match against Collingwood, Muir was reported for striking Ray Shaw. Muir claims that he was the victim of racial vilification all match from both Collingwood players and supporters. Muir showed obvious distress during and after the match. Collingwood fans abused Muir outside the change rooms at the end of the game. Journalist for The Age, Alan Attwood described the supporters as "hyenas round a cornered prey" while "baiting and abusing [Muir] in the lowest manner". Muir required a police escort to leave the ground but this did not stop his windshield being broken by a thrown bottle. At the tribunal Muir claimed he was spat on by Shaw. This was denied by Shaw and Muir was suspended for four matches. An anonymous teammate told the Truth "It isn't only Collingwood ... [racial abuse] happens to Robert all the time, and we're powerless to do anything to help him ... they're ruining a fine player".

At the end of 1980, Muir left St Kilda, returning to Ballarat for a while and then later settling in Adelaide. Muir returned to St Kilda in 1984 at the request of coach Tony Jewell, who allowed Muir to train in Adelaide and fly in to Melbourne for matches. In a reserves match in Geelong in April that season, Muir responded to persistent racial taunts from Geelong senior players over the fence - giving them "the finger" and ripping off his jumper to show them his black skin. Muir kicked seven goals that game.

Later than season, Muir played Carlton at their home ground Princes Park, Carlton. In a spiteful match, where Muir claims he was repeatedly racially vilified by his Carlton opponents - "every five or 10 minutes" - Muir was reported for violent conduct seven times. Despite Muir's misgivings, St Kilda and his advocate at the tribunal chose to use a defence of provocation by the racist abuse. Muir's defence included an impassioned plea from Mollie Dyer from the Aborigines Advancement League and fellow Aboriginal player Maurice Rioli spoke in Muir's defence stating "Robert can't accept [racial abuse] as a tactic [by opponents] like myself." Muir was found guilty of six of the seven charges and suspended for 12 matches.

Muir's mother Myrtle later spoke to The Sun News-Pictorial:

I've heard some of the things [Aboriginal players] have hurled at them during a match. People calling them 'boongs' and 'black bastards'. Most of the Aboriginal players can turn a deaf ear to it. It's just unfortunate Robert can't ... I never dreamed this sort of thing would go on in major league football.

— Myrtle Muir,

Muir told the same newspaper later "We do hear the supporters [make racist remarks] a bit, but it hurts when it comes from the players themselves. It shouldn't be allowed to go on".

Muir signed with SANFL club Woodville Football Club for the 1985 SANFL season, then coached by Malcolm Blight. In Woodville's away match against his former team West Torrens at Thebarton Oval, Muir again retaliated violently to repeated racial attacks. Playing at full-back, Muir was relentlessly hounded by West Torrens supporters in the crowd who, as well as abuse, spat on Muir with one supporter throwing cans and bottles at him. Muir asked Woodville's support staff to ask the police to eject the offender but the police did not act. At the end of the game, after again being hit by a thrown can, Muir took the matters into his own hands; he jumped the fence and repeatedly punched the offender. The police then intervened - to arrest Muir. Muir was sacked by Woodville as a result and this brought an end to his professional football career.

== Post-football ==
After football, Muir worked with a range of Aboriginal charitable groups, including with Aboriginal prisoners and mentoring young Aboriginal footballers and cricketers. He also coached RecLink football teams.

In 2006, Muir became involved in umpiring in an amateur league which was notorious for its players who disrespected officials. With Muir, a fearsome player, as umpire, it was believed his intimidating presence might help stamp out this behaviour. He also umpired the EJ Whitten Legends Game in 2006 as well as the "Barristers v Solicitors" charity game at Glenferrie Oval on 25 June 2006.

Muir has not been included in any Indigenous events organised by the St Kilda Football Club or the Australian Football League despite his high-profile role as one of few Indigenous players playing at the highest level in the 1970s.

In August 2020, Muir went public about being racially vilified by spectators, opponents, and even his own teammates during his playing days, including one incident where Muir says he was urinated on by his St Kilda teammates to the sound of laughter. Both the AFL and the St Kilda Football Club issued unreserved apologies for the despicable way Muir was treated.

St Kilda chief executive Matt Finnis issued a statement

Reading about the impact of racism on Robert Muir's life in today's ABC article will no doubt be confronting for everyone involved in football, as it was for me personally. We admire Robert's courage to speak out about the racism he has endured and lack of support provided by our club when he needed it most. We apologise unreservedly to Robert and his family and are humbled that he continues to love our club. Today we celebrate the contribution Indigenous players have made to our game as part of the Sir Doug Nicholls Round. However, we must face the reality that the St Kilda Football Club has made grave errors in the past and may still be failing to grasp the full impact of the hurt felt by individuals, their families and all Aboriginal and Torres Strait Islander peoples.

— Matt Finnis,

Similarly, the AFL issued their own apology that echoed that of St Kilda's. Muir was widely praised for his courage in exposing the level of racism that was prevalent during the time.

As of 2020, Muir is retired and lives on the outskirts of Adelaide.
