= Carlton Imperial Football Club =

Carlton Imperial

Names
- Full name: Carlton Imperial Football Club
- Nickname(s): Imperials; Carlton second twenty

Club details
- Founded: 1869; 157 years ago
- Dissolved: 1876; 150 years ago
- Colours: Unknown
- Competition: Unaffiliated era
- Premierships: Challenge Cup (1); 1875; Victorian (0)
- Ground: Royal Park

The Carlton Imperial Football Club was a 19th-century Australian rules football club that played in the later stages of the 'unaffiliated era' of Victorian football, but had dissolved prior to the commencement of the Victorian Football Association's (VFA) first season of 1877. The 'Imperials' played its home matches out of Royal Park, and were winners of the 1875 Challenge Cup.

The club is mostly known today as the former "training establishment" of the senior AFL club Carlton, though there was no official affiliation and that there were also players who would later have success with South Melbourne and South Australian Football Association (SAFA) club, Norwood.

== History ==
=== 1873–1874 Junior football ===
Though it is speculated that the club could have been established in 1869, the earliest record of the club's competitive existence can be traced back to the 1873 Victorian football season. The Imperials competed in the 'Junior' competition of that year's 'unaffiliated' season, where the team technically finished third on the ladder. During the season, the club was also referred to as the 'Carlton second twenty' though it was not officially the Reserve team of the senior team Carlton, who were competing in the three-team senior competition of that season.

In the following season of 1874, the Imperial team remained in the Junior competition, and fielded a second team in the local 'Carlton District' league where it competed against other Cartlon and Carlton North based teams. Future Carlton VFA premiership player and Australian Football Hall of Fame inductee George Coulthard, was recruited from fellow Carlton District team 'North Carlton' prior to the start of the season. The Imperials finished the Junior season in third place, being a second season in a row.

=== 1875–1876 Senior football ===
The 1875 season saw the Imperials being elevated to senior level, and had recruited future Carlton & South Melbourne VFA premiership and Norwood SAFA premiership player, Alfred McMichael. The Imperials finished third on the ladder for the regular season after playing eleven matches for five wins. At the end of the league season, the club would achieve its first and only accolade, the Challenge Cup after it defeated Albert Park 1–0 in the final on 9 October.

Before the commencement of the 1876 season, both Coulthard and McMichael had transferred to Carlton, along with forward player, Joe Henry, but had managed to recruit future Carlton & South Melbourne VFA premiership player and Norwood SAFA premiership captain & coach, Alfred Waldron from Albert Park.

The Imperials competed in the senior league but had finished last on the ladder after playing eight matches for two wins, as opposed to the teams that had played as few as thirteen matches and up to twenty matches. The Australasian newspaper had noted that the loss of players to dominant & second-placed side, Carlton, had caused the Imperials to suffer "very materially at the beginning of the season through the wiles of the local enemy", but had noted Waldron's performances throughout the season. The match between the Imperials and Carlton on July 1st was known its "bad conduct" by the Imperial players and had been labelled as 'disgraceful' by the Australasian newspaper. The match was won 4–1 by Carlton in front of a 'large crowd' following 'considerable local interest'.

Following the 1876 season, all of the senior teams except for East Melbourne and Imperials did not compete in the newly established VFA's season of 1877, and that the Imperials had reportedly dissolved. It was noted that some players had joined senior league team Hotham but others had followed Coulthard and McMichael's steps in joining local rivals Carlton, including Waldron, Ted Barrass, and last Imperial captain, Alexander Ford, all of whom were premiership players for Carlton that season. Future Carlton player, and Australian Army Medical Corps medical practitioner, Charlie Oliver also played for the Imperials, but when exactly remains unknown.

== Notable players ==
- Ted Barrass – Carlton, South Melbourne
- George Coulthard – Carlton
- Alexander Ford – Carlton, last recorded captain of the Imperials
- Joe Henry – Carlton
- Charlie Oliver – Carlton
- Alfred McMichael – Carlton, Norwood, South Melbourne
- Alfred Waldron – Carlton, Norwood

== See also ==
- History of Australian rules football in Victoria (1859-1900)

== Sources ==
- Pennings, Mark (2012). Origins of Australian Football: Victoria's Early History: Volume 1: Amateur Heroes and the Rise of Clubs, 1858 to 1876. Connor Court Publishing Pty Ltd. ISBN 9781921421471.
