= Alfred Waldron (footballer) =

Australian rules footballer and cricketer

Alfred 'Topsy' Waldron
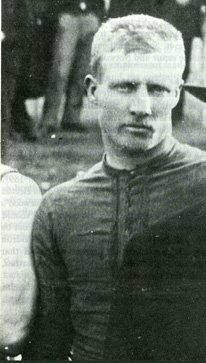

Personal information
- Full name: Alfred Edward Waldron
- Born: 26 February 1857; Mornington, Victoria, Australia
- Died: 7 June 1929 (aged 72); Adelaide, South Australia
- Original team: Montague
- Position: Utility

Playing career^{1}
Years	Club	Games (Goals)
1875	Albert-park	1 (0)
1876	Carlton Imperial	5 (0)
1877–1878	Carlton	27 (0)
1879–1892, 1896, 1898	Norwood	197 (45)
Total		230 (45)

Representative team honours
Years	Team	Games (Goals)
	South Australia	6
- ^{1} Playing statistics correct to the end of 1892.

Career highlights
- Club: Norwood captain 1881–1885, 1887–1890, 1892; Carlton premiership player (1877); 9x Norwood premiership player (1879, 1880, 1881, 1882, 1883, 1887, 1888, 1889, 1891); 6x Norwood premiership captain (1881, 1882, 1883, 1887, 1888, 1889); Norwood Championship of Australia captain (1888); Coaching: 6x Norwood premiership coach (1881, 1882, 1883, 1887, 1888, 1889); Honours: South Australian Football Hall of Fame (2002)

Alfred Edward 'Topsy' Waldron (26 February 1857 – 7 June 1929) was an Australian rules footballer who played mostly for Norwood in the South Australian Football Association (SAFA) during the 19th century. He also played two first-class cricket matches for South Australia.

== Early life ==
Waldron's nickname 'Topsy' was used by his brother and stayed with him throughout his football career.

== Albert-Park (1875) ==
He started his career at Albert-park, playing most of that season in the Second Twenty before being chosen for a match against Melbourne.

== Carlton Imperial (1876) ==
In 1876, Waldron played a season with Carlton Imperial.

== Carlton (1877–1878) ==
When Carlton Imperial folded, he crossed to Carlton in the newly formed Victorian Football Association (VFA), playing in their 1877 VFA premiership side.

At the end of 1878, Waldron was convinced by a friend to go to Norwood, and he joined them for their second season in the SAFA.

== Norwood (1879–1892, 1896, 1898) ==
In 1888, Waldron captained Norwood to victory in the inaugural Championship of Australia. The club took on South Melbourne at Kensington Oval for the title and won the series 3–0. He also captained South Australia in three inter-colonial games and played in six games in all.

Waldron was captain of Norwood for a club record ten seasons, and played in nine of their early premiership teams, six as captain.

== Records ==
His career total of ten premierships is a record for elite Australian rules football as of 2026, equal with David "Dolly" Christy: given the nature of the modern game, this record is exceedingly unlikely to ever be broken.

Waldron was also the first player in elite Australian rules football to play 200 games, achieving this feat in 1890. His 197 games for Norwood remained the South Australian elite football record until it was broken by Harry "Tick" Phillips of Port Adelaide in 1900 (in his last match), and would remain the Norwood club record until it was broken in 1957 by Douglas Olds.

== Cricket ==
His two first-class cricket matches were played almost five years apart, in 1881/82 and 1887/88. Waldron failed with the bat in both but took 3 for 18 against Victoria at the Adelaide Oval in what was the only innings he bowled in. One of those wickets was Test cricketer Tup Scott.

== Honours ==
When the South Australian Football Hall of Fame was opened to inductees in 2002, Waldron was one of the first added, and the oldest.
