= A. James Kerley =

American academic

President of Gulf Coast State College
- In office 2007–2014

Personal details
- Education: Florida State University; The Citadel; Tennessee Tech University

A. James Kerley is an American academic, and is a former President of Gulf Coast State College in Panama City, Florida. Kerley graduated with his bachelor's degree in social science and history from Tennessee Tech University. He received his master's degree in history from The Citadel and his Doctorate in educational administration from Florida State University. In 2007 he was selected to be the 5th President of then Gulf Coast Community College, and retired in 2014.

== Awards ==
- Commander's Award for Support of Soldiers and Family Members.
