= Ben Ingleton =

Australian rules footballer

Personal information
- Full name: Ben Ingleton
- Born: 24 August 1967 (age 59)
- Height: 180 cm (5 ft 11 in)
- Weight: 76 kg (168 lb)

Playing career^{1}
Years	Club	Games (Goals)
1985–1986, 1989	St Kilda	25 (9)
- ^{1} Playing statistics correct to the end of 1989.

Ben Ingleton (born 24 August 1967) is a former Australian rules footballer who played for the St Kilda Football Club in the Victorian Football League (VFL).
