= 1877 VFA season =

1st season of the Victorian Football Association

Overview
- Date: 19 May – 6 October 1877
- Premiers: Carlton; 1st premiership
- Leading goalkicker: Charles Baker (Melbourne – 14 goals)

The 1877 VFA season was the inaugural season of the Victorian Football Association (VFA), the highest-level Australian rules football competition in the colony of Victoria. It was the first season in which football in Victoria was run under a properly constituted administrative body.

The VFA was formed with the view to governing the sport via a collective body, made up of delegates representing the clubs. Although the formation was a significant step in the organisation of football, it was effectively an administrative change only, and there was no significant change to the manner in which matches were scheduled and played – or the premiership decided – compared to the unaffiliated 1876 season.

Carlton won the inaugural VFA premiership after finishing the season with 14 wins from its 21 matches.

== VFA foundation ==
The Victorian Football Association was established on 17 May 1877 to provide administration of the game in Victoria. It was the second such body to have been formed, after the South Australian Football Association (SAFA) was formed 17 days prior to the VFA. Prior to 1877, the laws of the game had been agreed to at an annual meeting of club secretaries, however the clubs remained entirely independent and unaffiliated. This meant that when a dispute existed between two clubs, there was no formal means of resolving it or enforcing a decision.

Disputes in the 1870s were common and were often left unresolved for this reason: for example, in 1876, a rule existed to prevent any player from playing with more than one club during the season, but when Carlton broke the rule against Albert-park, there was no means of recourse against it, and the result of a disputed match between Carlton and Melbourne was unresolved, with each club ultimately reporting a different score in its annual report and no central body existing to declare one score as official. Additionally, the matter of whether or not Albert Park won the Challenge Cup in 1870 was never formally resolved.

The new Association was established, and was modelled in large part on the Victorian Cricket Association (VCA), which had been established in September 1875 to provide a similar level of centralised administration over Victorian cricket. The Victorian Football Association comprised one delegate from each senior metropolitan club (and from senior country clubs by proxy) and a vote of those club delegates could make a decision which was binding on any associated club. Junior clubs were also managed by the Association, but did not have representation on the board.

The Association was established with the power to:

- Decide upon the Laws of the Game
- Provide management of local and intercolonial football matches
- Provide a ruling on disputes between clubs
- Act as a tribunal to suspend players for misconduct

== Association membership ==
The Association comprised a range of senior and junior clubs from Melbourne and around the colony of Victoria. There were five inaugural metropolitan senior clubs: Albert Park, Carlton, Hotham, Melbourne and St Kilda. Hotham was a revival of the former North Melbourne Football Club, which had disbanded and seen many of its players and members join Albert-park in 1876; the revived club was mostly made up of players from the former North Melbourne Football Club as well as some from the Carlton Imperial Football Club, which had folded at the end of 1876.

Provincial senior teams included Ballarat, Ballarat Albion, Barwon Geelong, Kyneton and Sandhurst.

There was also a wide range of affiliated junior clubs, including Brunswick, Clifton, Coburg, Essendon, Excelsior, Hotham United, Sandridge, Toorak, Sandridge, South Melbourne, Victorian Railways, Warwick, West Melbourne, and Williamstown.

== Metropolitan ==
The 1877 premiership was won by the Carlton Football Club, which played twenty-one matches during the year, winning fourteen and drawing four. Melbourne finished second, having played twenty-three matches, winning sixteen and drawing four. At the time, Melbourne and Carlton were considered to be by far the strongest senior clubs, so Carlton's position as the top club was based almost entirely on head-to-head matches between the two clubs – of which Carlton won two, Melbourne won one, and one was drawn.

=== Club records ===
The below table is set of results for the 1877 season, showing the records of the five senior metropolitan clubs. The list shows the record across all matches, including senior, junior and intercolonial matches. The clubs are listed in the order in which they were ranked in The Australasian.

The VFA had no formal process by which the clubs were ranked, so the below order should be considered indicative only, particularly since the fixturing of matches was not standardised; however, the top three placings were later acknowledged in publications including the Football Record and are considered official.

Pos	Team	Pld	W	L	D	GF	GA
1	Carlton (P)	21	14	3	4	56	11
2	Melbourne	23	16	3	4	47	21
3	Hotham	14	7	5	2	27	16
	Albert Park	12	5	4	3	17	10
	St Kilda	17	5	7	5	25	35

(P) Premiers

== Provincial ==
In the provincial competition, Barwon was the strongest team, while Geelong was second.

=== Club records ===
The below shows the record of provincial clubs against senior metropolitan clubs.

Pos	Team	Pld	W	L	D	GF	GA
1	Barwon (P)	5	2	0	3	5	3
2	Geelong	4	2	2	0	4	5
3	Ballarat	4	0	2	2	0	4

(P) Premiers

== Juniors ==
In the junior competition, West Melbourne was the strongest club, going undefeated against junior clubs with its sole loss coming against senior club Melbourne. Essendon was second, with five wins and six draws from its 17 games. Both clubs were admitted into the VFA's senior ranks for the following season. Toorak was undefeated in all its matches.

=== Club records ===
Pos	Team	Pld	W	L	D	GF	GA
1	West Melbourne (P)	17	12	1	4	17	6
2	Essendon	17	5	6	6	14	13
3	Hotham United	18	7	7	4	20	13
4	South Melbourne						
5	Williamstown						
6	Victorian Railways						
7	Excelsior						
8	Toorak	16	14	0	2	39	3
9	Warwick	18	9	3	6	19	11
10	Adelphian						
11	Clifton						
12	Brunswick	12	5	3	4	8	5
13	Northcote						
14	Coburg						
15	Sandridge						
–	Hawthorn	15	4	4	7	6	22

(P) Premiers

== Notable events ==
- Sir William Clarke, MLC became the inaugural president of the Association.
- Carlton, Melbourne and St Kilda each went on intercolonial trips during the season:
  - Carlton was hosted by the Waratah club in New South Wales. On 23 June, Waratah defeated Carlton 2–0 under the rugby rules which were prevalent in New South Wales at the time, and on 25 June, Carlton defeated Waratah 6–0 under Victorian rules.
  - Melbourne was hosted by the Victorian SAFA club in South Australia, where Victorian rules were played. Melbourne defeated Victorian (SAFA) 1–0 on 11 August, then defeated a composite South Australian SAFA team 5–0.
  - St Kilda was hosted by the Adelaide (SAFA) club in South Australia. St Kilda defeated Adelaide 5–2 on 18 August, then defeated a composite South Australian SAFA team 7–2 on 20 August.
- The leading goalkicker for the season was Charles Baker (Melbourne), who kicked 14 goals.
