= Kerley's Harbour, Newfoundland and Labrador =

Coordinates: 48°17′N 53°28′W

Kerley's Harbour was a small outport village on Trinity Bay, Newfoundland and Labrador, Canada. Kerley's Harbour was formerly called Careless Harbour. The first recorded settlement of Kerley's Harbour was in the 1845 Newfoundland census, with a population of 40. However, the community existed long before this time as William Maher married Flora Jeans on October 15, 1821, in Careless Harbour as it is recorded in the Roman Catholic records. The population reached a peak of 90 residents in 1935. The main settlers of the community were Millers, Ivanys, Kings and Clarkes.

After the provincial government's resettlement plan, the town was abandoned in 1963. No original buildings are standing in Kerley's Harbour today, however some home foundations and root cellars still remain. Some locals have returned to the area to build cottages. However, the area is inaccessible by road. Visitors must follow a 2 kilometre trail from the nearby community of New Bonaventure, Newfoundland, or enter by boat.

== See also ==
- List of communities in Newfoundland and Labrador
