= Barwon Football Club =

Names
- Full name: Barwon Football and Factories United Cricket Club
- Nickname(s): Riverites

Club details
- Founded: 1874
- Dissolved: April 1879
- Colours: White, navy blue and pink
- Competition: Challenge Cup
- Premierships: Challenge Cup: 1876-77
- Ground(s): Communn-na-Feine ground

Barwon Football Club was a 19th-century Australian rules football club based in South Geelong, Victoria, and for a brief period during the mid-1870s, was provincial Victoria's strongest football club.

The club was established in 1874 in the growing industrial district of South Geelong, and it played the majority of its games on the Communn-na-Feine ground, which is now the site of the Communn-na-Feine pub 850 metres (930 yd) from modern-day Kardinia Park.

By 1875, the club had developed the on-field strength to compete with the city's hitherto pre-eminent club, the Geelong Football Club, and a strong rivalry between the two developed.

Due to Barwon's location in the industrial part of Geelong, the club was built on a working class character, and this social distinction from the middle-to-upper class Geelong Football Club, which was aligned heavily with the local private schools, was a contributing factor to the clubs' rivalry.

This rivalry was heightened after a match between the clubs in late 1875, when Barwon players were criticised for their rough behaviour, constantly disputing the umpire's decisions, and for having allegedly placed bets on themselves to win the match, all of which were averse to the prevailing view among Geelong fans of the game as a gentlemanly amateur pursuit. In 1876, Barwon adopted a guernsey of navy blue and white hoops, but was forced to add a pink sash as Geelong had adopted the same colours.

In the following two years Barwon surpassed Geelong to establish itself as the strongest provincial club in Victoria. The rivalry between Barwon and Geelong heightened in their 1876 Challenge Cup match, when Geelong accused Barwon of repeatedly and intentionally kicking the ball out of bounds to waste time throughout the entire second half to defend a 2–1 lead, which was still legal at that time but was considered unsportsmanlike; consequently, Geelong refused to play against Barwon in 1877. Barwon was the permanent winner of the 1876–77 Geelong, Ballarat and Wimmera District Challenge Cup, which was won by the provincial club with the most wins across those two seasons; and, after recording two wins and two draws against metropolitan teams in 1877, was considered to be one of the best clubs in the colony that season. In 1877, the club formed an off-field amalgamation with the Factories United Cricket Club, which also played at Communn-na-Feine.

In 1878, a decline in form by Barwon coincided with a revival by Geelong, and several players defected from the club. A number of brawls initiated by Barwon players at the end of the Barwon vs Geelong match in September – abandoned after Barwon supporters invaded the ground with ten minutes remaining – and later the same night between players on Moorabool Street, further harmed the club's reputation.

In April 1879, faced with insolvency due to rising costs to upgrade and pay rent on its ground and declining crowds following Geelong's 1878 VFA premiership, the club merged with the Chilwell Football Club under the Chilwell banner. It thus has a continuous historical link to the Newtown & Chilwell Football Club (formed in 1934), which as of 2022 still competes in the Geelong Football League.
