= East Melbourne Football Club =

Names
- Full name: East Melbourne Football Club
- Former name: Clarendon Football Club
- Nickname: Easts

Club details
- Founded: 1878; 147 years ago
- Dissolved: August 1882; 143 years ago
- Competition: Victorian Football Association

Uniforms
Home

The East Melbourne Football Club was an Australian rules football club which played in the Victorian Football Association (VFA).

The club was formed as the Clarendon Football Club in 1878 in connection with the cricket club of the same name, before changing its name to East Melbourne in 1879; some observers considered the club a resuscitation of an earlier East Melbourne Football Club which had played at a junior and later senior level during the early to mid-1870s.

The club played two seasons as a junior club, and was the leading junior club in the colony in 1879, having beaten every junior club it played during the year. It was elevated to senior status the following year, and played as a senior VFA club from 1880 until 1882.

However, the club never was competitive at senior level, and failed to win a game against a senior opponent in its three seasons with an overall record of four draws and twenty-five losses from twenty-nine matches.

East Melbourne dropped out of the VFA and disbanded in August 1882, having lost their six games against senior opponents that year and being goalless while having 35 goals kicked against them.

== See also ==
- East Melbourne Cricket Ground
- History of Australian rules football in Victoria (1859-1900)
