= Ballarat Football Netball Club =

Names
- Full name: Ballarat Football Netball Club, Inc.
- Nickname: Swans
- Motto: "Et Nos Unum Sumus" (We Are One)

Club details
- Founded: 20 May 1860; 166 years ago
- Colours: Red White
- Competition: Ballarat Football League
- President: Craig Lightfoot
- Coach: Chris Maple and Adam Ridley
- Captain: Andrew Hooper
- Premierships: BFL (20): 1897, 1898, 1908, 1923, 1928, 1930, 1932, 1933, 1940, 1942, 1943, 1944, 1951, 1954, 1955, 1962, 1971, 1988, 2008, 2026
- Ground: Alfredton Recreation Reserve (1994–present)
- Former ground: City Oval (1906–93)

Uniforms
Seniors	Junior White	Junior Red

Other information
- Official website: ballaratfnc.com.au

The Ballarat Football Netball Club, nicknamed the Swans, is an Australian rules football and netball club. The football squad currently competes in the Ballarat Football League in the Ballarat region of Victoria, Australia. Ballarat has won more senior football premierships in the Ballarat Football Netball League than any other competing club, with a total of 20 senior football premierships.

The club was established on 20 May 1860, making it the 3rd oldest continually operating football club in Australia, behind Melbourne (May 1859) and Geelong (July 1859).

== History ==
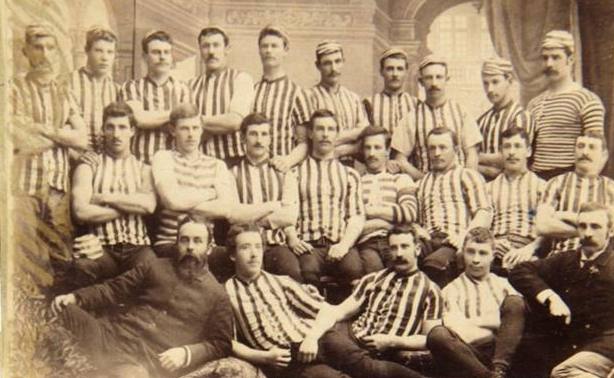
Ballarat Football Club in 1889

Calls for the club's formation date as far back as May 1860. One of the first recorded football matches played in the district was a match on 5 May 1860 with the members of the Ballarat Athletic Club splitting into two sides of six to play at the Copenhagen Grounds. The Ballarat Athletic Club was instrumental in early matches including the town of Little Bendigo at the Ballarat Cricket Ground though the match was cancelled due to inclement weather. The Ballarat Star had been lobbying the local community for a club of its own. Ballarat Football Club was incorporated on 20 May 1860.

Among its first big opponents was the Geelong Football Club in 1862 which was captained by H. C. A. Harrison. The Ballaratians captained by Alexander Greenfield travelled by train to Geelong lost the match.

Its first president and captain was Lieutenant Colonel Alexander M. Greenfield. Its senior best and fairest award is named after Alexander Greenfield.

The club hosted the touring British footballers in 1888, with the third quarter of the match played in a snow storm.

Ballarat played their home matches at City Oval in Ballarat for 88 years, then moved to their current location at Alfredton Recreation Reserve in 1994. Ballarat's senior guernsey is white with Red 'V'.

Ballarat was a provincial member of the Victorian Football Association from 1878 until 1896, taking part in the association's administration and competing regularly against Melbourne-based VFA clubs. The club was also a founding member of the Ballarat Football Association in 1893. In 1955 the club officially applied to join the VFL. Although the application was referred to a special sub-committee that was to meet and make a recommendation, there is no evidence that the application was ever acted on by the league.

Ballarat Football Netball Club's junior program has produced recent AFL players Drew Petrie, twins Nathan & Mitch Brown, brothers Brad & Matt Crouch and AFLW player Sophie Van De Heuvel.

== Club identity ==
=== Guernsey ===
The senior jumper is white with a red V. The club senior team wore red & white vertical stripes between season 2010 and 2018, however reverted to the traditional red V from season 2019.

The junior 'Ballarat White' division of the club wear the red and white vertical stripes, and the junior 'Ballarat Red' division wear red and white horizontal hoops. Both junior jumpers have historical significance as being designs worn by Ballarat FC during the 1800s.

=== Song ===
The club song is known as "Cheer, Cheer The Red and The White" and is to the tune of the Victory March, the fight song of the Notre Dame Fighting Irish in South Bend, Indiana, USA. The words are:

Cheer, cheer the red and the white,
Honour the name by day and by night,
Lift that noble banner high,
Shake down the thunder from the sky.
Whether the odds be great or small,
Ballarat will go and win overall,
While her loyal sons are marching
Onwards to victory!

=== Mascot ===
The club's mascot is the swan.

=== Home ground ===
Since the start of the 1994 season Ballarat have played their home games at the Alfredton Recreation Reserve, in the western suburb of Alfredton. From 1906 to 1993, Ballarat played their home matches at the City Oval, beside Lake Wendouree, where they were co-tenants with Redan. The move to Alfredton was a strategic one based on the growing population of Alfredton and the opportunity to join its junior division, who had been playing at Alfredton since 1984.

== Football Premierships ==
Ballarat Football League

- Senior Football (20)
  - 1897, 1898, 1908, 1923, 1928, 1930, 1932, 1933, 1940, 1942, 1943, 1944, 1951, 1954, 1955, 1962, 1971, 1988, 2008, 2026
- Under 15's:
  - 2005

== League Best & Fairest winners ==
Senior Football

- Ballarat Football League - George McKenzie Memorial Medal
  - 1933 - W.T. "Webber" Jackson. (Tied with the winner on 13 votes each, but in 2010, the Ballarat FNL awarded three retrospective best and fairest medals who originally polled the same number of votes as the winner, but finished second in the award, on the countback system, except for the 1933 "winner", W.T. "Webber" Jackson), whose family have never received a retrospective medal.
  - 1935 - W.T. "Webber" Jackson
- Ballarat Football League - Ballarat Courier Gold Medal
  - 1950 - Frank Pike
  - 1952 - Stan Wallis
- Ballarat Football League - Henderson Medal
  - 1972 - Peter Merriman
  - 1974 - Brendan Mahar
  - 1977 - Don Discher
  - 1985 - Don Discher
  - 2014 - Shane Hutchinson

== Leading BFL Goal Kicker ==
Senior Football - Tony Lockett Medalists

- 1927 - Dave Duff 113
- 1928 - Dave Duff 91
- 1929 - Dave Duff 96
- 1930 - Harry Cooper 95
- 1934 - G Anderson 72
- 1936 - Max Wheeler 108
- 1957 - Robert Brannigan 47
- 1972 - Greg Brown 72
- 1986 - Phil Taglaibue 84
- 2010 - Sam Harkin 58
- 2019 - Andrew Hooper 41
- 2026 - Biggie Nyuon 59

== VFL/AFL players ==
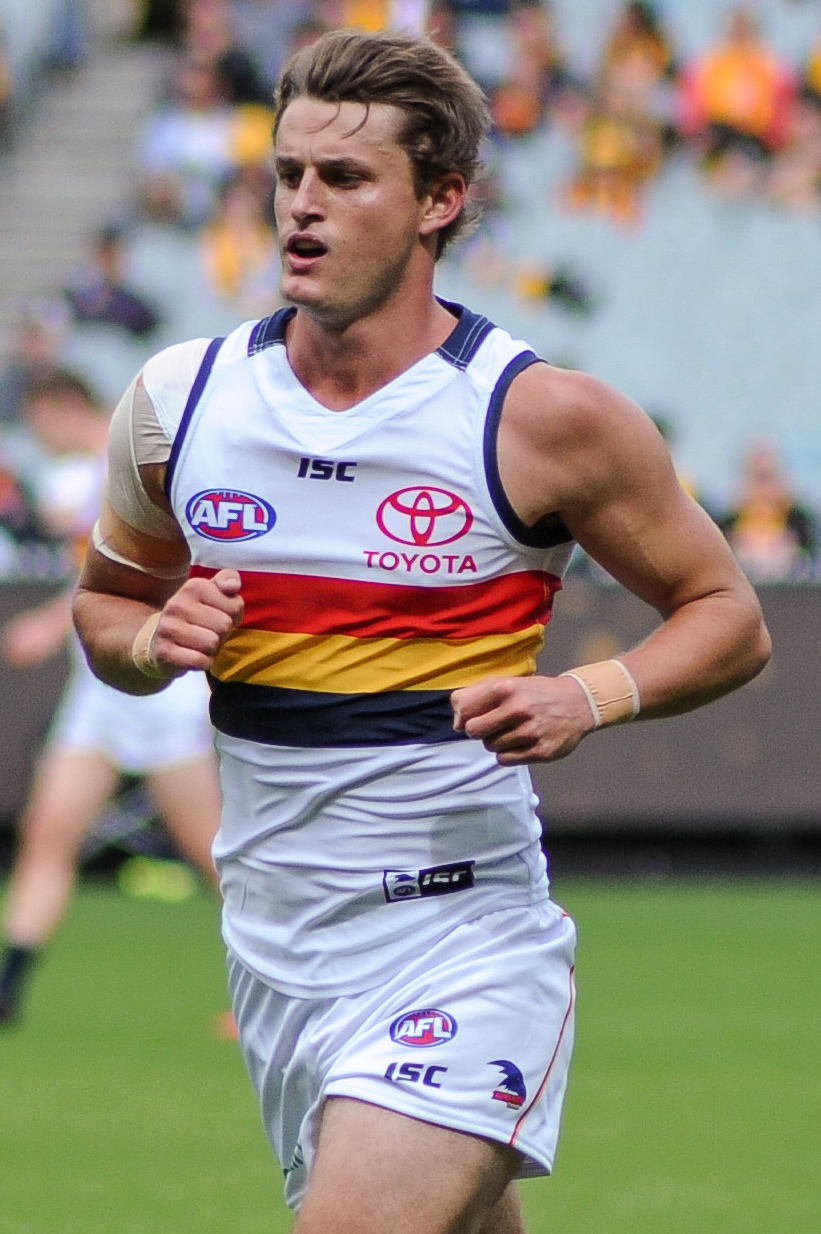
Matt Crouch, from the Adelaide Crows played his junior football with the Ballarat FC

- Dave Duff - Melbourne
- Mick Twomey - Collingwood
- Geoff Tunbridge - Melbourne
- David Shaw - Essendon
- Percy Beames - Melbourne
- John Birt - Essendon
- Robert Muir - St Kilda
- Don Discher - St Kilda
- Ben Ingleton - St Kilda
- Drew Petrie - North Melbourne / West Coast
- Nathan Brown - Collingwood / St Kilda
- Mitchell Brown - West Coast
- Brad Crouch - Adelaide
- Matt Crouch - Adelaide
- Sophie Van De Heuvel - Geelong (AFLW)

== Club records ==
Most Senior Games: Paul Nicholls 248

Most Senior Goals: Max Wheeler 359 (1935–1939)

Most Goals in a Game: Max Wheeler 17 v Ballarat CYMS (1938)

Most Goals in a Senior Season: Dave Duff 113 (1927)

Most Greenfield Trophies (Senior B&F's): Don Discher x 6 (1977, 1985, 1986, 1987, 1990, 1991) Ashley Baker x 6 (2003, 2004, 2005, 2006, 2008, 2012)

Most Years as Coach: Len Templar 15 years (1958–1967, 1970–1972, 1977–1978)

Most Years as Captain: Harry Kaighan 8 years (1921 – 1928)

Most Years as Club President: Matt Glover 21 years (1948 – 1968)

Most Years as Club Secretary: J. Shannon 18 Years (1914 – 1931)

Most Years as Club Treasurer: E. R. Bodycomb 26 years (1897 – 1922)

== Bibliography ==
- History of Football in the Ballarat District (2008) by John Stoward - ISBN 978-0-9805929-0-0
