= 1871 Victorian football season =

2nd senior season of Australian rules football in Victoria

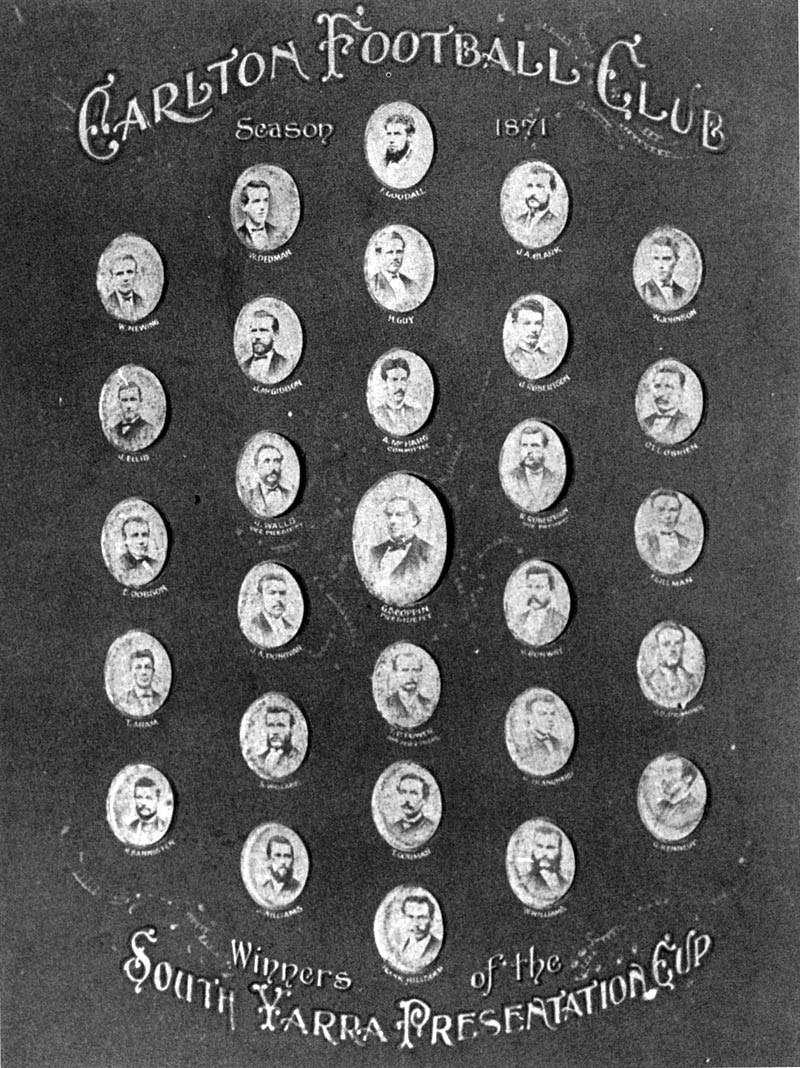
- Carlton – 1871 Victorian premiers
- Senior teams: 4
- Premiers: Carlton; 1st premiership
- Challenge Cup: Carlton; 1st Challenge Cup win

The 1871 Victorian football season was the second senior season of Australian rules football in the colony of Victoria. Carlton was the premier club for first time, and it also won the Challenge Cup.

== 1871 season ==
Four clubs participated in senior football during the 1871 season: Albert-park, Carlton, Melbourne and South Yarra. Hobson's Bay Railway folded at the conclusion of the 1870 season.

The formal practice of senior clubs playing matches at odds against junior clubs was established during the season. In matches played at odds, the senior team fielded fifteen players and the junior team fielded twenty players. Matches played at odds were quite competitive: the premier club Carlton was unbeaten at even strength against senior clubs, but lost two of five matches played at odds. Three metropolitan junior clubs – Collingwood, Richmond and Carlton United – played against the senior clubs during the year. Senior clubs also played matches against provincial clubs Ballarat (at odds) and Geelong (even strength) during the year.

During the 1871 season, the senior clubs competed in specific matches for the Challenge Cup; and, separately, a premier team was selected based on all matches during the season, including Challenge Cup matches.

=== Challenge Cup ===
The Challenge Cup which South Yarra had put up for contest at the start of the 1870 season was returned by Albert-park to South Yarra at the end of the year, following the dispute over whether or not Albert-park had formally won it.

South Yarra opted to put the trophy up for contest again in 1871. Albert-park declined to contest it, although it continued to play senior games against the other clubs. The remaining clubs – Carlton, Melbourne and South Yarra – decided that each club would play the others three times during the season, and the top two would play a single playoff match for the Cup.

This meant that the Cup was being contested in a league-type competition, and by traditional definitions was no longer a Challenge Cup with a perpetual holder.

1871 Challenge Cup Ladder
No.	TEAM	P	W	L	D	GF	GA	Pts
1	Melbourne (Q)	6	3	0	3	13	0	18
2	Carlton (Q)	4	1	0	3	1	0	10
3	South Yarra	4	0	4	0	0	14	0
Key: P = Played, W = Won, L = Lost, D = Drawn, (Q) = Qualified for Final

Two of the three Carlton-Melbourne matches were postponed by four weeks due to rain, while the two unplayed Carlton-South Yarra matches were scratched.

	Playoff match for the Challenge Cup
Saturday, 7 October 1871 (3:00 pm)	Carlton	def.	Melbourne	Emerald Hill Ground
	2; 2	Half; Final	0; 0
	Clarke, Dedman	Goals

With this victory in the playoff match, Carlton claimed undisputed and permanent ownership of the South Yarra Challenge Cup, and also won the 1871 premiership.

=== Premiership ===
In addition to winning the Challenge Cup, Carlton was adjudged premiers for the season, and Melbourne were runners-up.

The two clubs were the dominant senior clubs in the colony, and the premiership was mostly determined based on the win–loss record in matches between the two: their four matches, including the Challenge Cup playoff match, yielded one win for Carlton and three draws, though the third draw was disputed (claimed as a win by Melbourne and as a draw by Carlton).

Albert-park was third: while they lost their matches against Carlton and Melbourne, they beat South Yarra (who had been winless since 1868 in senior matches) twice during the year.

Carlton's and Melbourne's overall records as reported at each club's Annual General Meeting in 1872 (reporting different results for the disputed match between the teams) are given below. The Senior results include the Challenge Cup playoff match, and matches Carlton and Melbourne played against Geelong.

1871 senior clubs' results
		Senior Results				Overall Results					
	TEAM	P	W	L	D	P	W	L	D	GF	GA
1	Carlton	8	5	0	3	13	6	2	5	8	3
2	Melbourne	11	7	1	3	15	9	4	2	28	6
3	Albert-park	7	2	5	0						
	South Yarra	6	0	6	0						
Key: P = Played, W = Won, L = Lost, D = Drawn, GF = Goals For, GA = Goals Against, (P) = Premiers										Sources:	
