= 1870 Victorian football season =

1st senior season of Australian rules football in Victoria

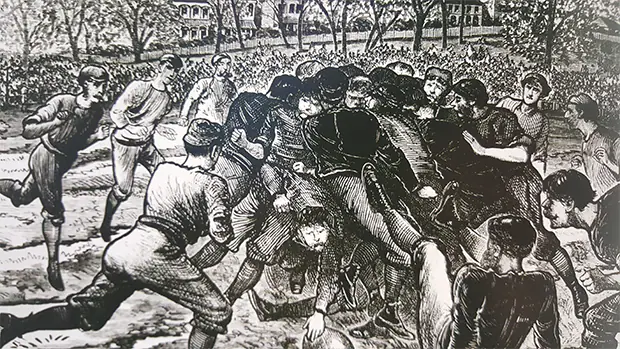
- A match between Melbourne and Carlton
- Senior teams: 5
- Premiers: Melbourne; 1st premiership
- Challenge Cup: Albert Park; 1st Challenge Cup win

The 1870 Victorian football season was the inaugural senior premiership season of Australian rules football in the colony of Victoria. The competition was played during the winter of 1870, consisting of matches between metropolitan football clubs in Melbourne.

The premier club was Melbourne, while Albert Park was the disputed winner of the Challenge Cup.

== Historical status ==
Although Australian rules football had been played in some form during Melbourne winters since 1858, the 1870 season is conventionally considered to be the first season of senior football competition in Victorian history, or at least the first season for which a premiership can be officially allocated.

The convention of 1870 being the inaugural premiership was applied retrospectively: in 1889, The Argus newspaper first published a table of historical premiers, and second and third-placed teams, dating back to 1870. In the article adjoining the 1889 table, it was commented that the haphazard nature of scheduling, frequency of cancelled matches, and overall lower standard of play made it difficult to assign a premiership for the seasons played between 1858 and 1869.

The VFL's official publication, the Football Record, also showed this table from its inception in 1912 until 1918. From 1919 to 1923, this table was replaced with a table that showed the top four club placings since 1897, and two supplementary tables showing cumulated placings for the periods 1897-1918 and 1870-1918. These supplementary tables were omitted from the 1924 editions of the Record, and did not reappear after that.

Since 2016, the AFL Commission has formally recognised the highest level of Victorian football back to 1870 as senior: this applies to both the unaffiliated era from 1870 to 1876 and the Victorian Football Association era from 1877 to 1896.

However, as of February 2026, it maintains a distinction between the seasons from 1870-1896 and the history of the VFL/AFL from 1897 onwards, requiring statistics and achievements from these periods to be delineated, while at the same time allowing clubs to recognise their 1870–1896 statistics and achievements in their own histories.

In September 2025, the matter of the statistics and achievements from the 1870-1896 seasons reached the AFL Heritage Committee: the approval of the AFL Commission is required before any official changes are made to the AFL's records.

== 1870 season ==
Five clubs participated in senior football during the 1870 season: the city's principal clubs (Albert-park, Carlton, Melbourne and South Yarra), and a new club representing the Hobson's Bay Railway, which was playing its first season of senior football after three years of competing at junior level.

The five clubs competed in specific matches for the Challenge Cup, and for the premiership (based on all matches played during the season).

=== Challenge Cup ===
In 1870, the South Yarra Football Club purchased and put up a new trophy, known as the Challenge Cup (sometimes as the South Yarra Presentation Challenge Cup to differentiate it from previous challenge cups donated by different organisations), for competition.

South Yarra was the permanent holder of the previous Challenge Cup, having won it in 1866, and decided it would be appropriate to provide a new trophy for competition. The rules related to the presentation of the new Challenge Cup were as follows:

- South Yarra would be the initial holder of the cup.
- Any match between the holder of the cup and another senior team would be played for the cup.
- In a cup match, the winner of the match would take possession of the cup, and the incumbent holder would retain the cup in the event of a draw.
- A club would become the permanent holder of the cup if it won the cup four times in a row without a loss (but with no limit on the number of drawn games during that streak); until that time, the cup would remain a perpetual award.

Other stipulations relating to Challenge Cup games were that they were required to be controlled by central umpires, rather than by the team captains, and that no player was allowed to play for more than one club in Challenge Cup games during the year.

Albert-park took possession of the Cup in the first game against South Yarra, and never relinquished it.

However, the fate of the Cup became controversial when Hobson's Bay Railway forfeited its 11 June match against Albert-park due to lack of players: Railway declined to play when only fourteen of its selected twenty turned up on the day of the match. Conventionally, such a game would simply be considered a no-contest, but with the Challenge Cup at stake, Albert-park took to the field and scored two goals against no opposition as a formality and claimed a walkover victory. Such an outcome had never been seen before, one sportswriter commenting that "in connection with football, the idea of a walkover is simply absurd and unprecedented."

Having counted the walkover as its second Cup win, Albert-park subsequently claimed permanent possession of the Cup with its fourth win of the year on 20 August. However, the walkover victory was not recognised by South Yarra (as cup donors) or the other clubs, who all argued that the match was a no-contest rather than an Albert-park victory, and that another win was required to claim permanent ownership of the Cup. Albert-park argued that enough procedural requirements, such as the appointment of umpires and the pre-game coin toss, had been carried out for the game to be considered official, while Railway denied that these procedures had been carried out. Albert-park also argued that it was entitled to claim victory because Railway had declined the options of playing short or fielding other club officials or members who were present.

Ultimately, the dispute was unresolved: there was no central body which could make a binding ruling on whether or not the walkover counted as a victory, and neither side conceded its opponent's point. Albert-park played only one further game for the season, a draw against Melbourne, but it refused to put the Cup up for contest in that match. Albert-park was denied the chance to become the undisputed permanent holder of the Cup on 6 August, when its return match with the weak Railway club was cancelled due to inclement weather.

Albert-park ultimately gave the Cup back to South Yarra at the end of the year, but maintained its position that it had won the Cup outright and was donating it in its capacity as the Cup's owner. South Yarra maintained its position that Albert-park had not won the Cup, and had forfeited its position as incumbent holder.

The following table lists the final results of all Challenge Cup games.

	1870 Challenge Cup games
Saturday, 28 May	South Yarra 1	def. by	Albert-park 3	St Kilda Cricket Ground
Saturday, 4 June	Albert-park 0	drew with	Melbourne 0	Emerald Hill Ground (crowd: 1,500)
Saturday, 11 June (walkover, disputed)	Albert-park	def.	Hobson's Bay Railway	Emerald Hill Ground
Saturday, 18 June	Carlton 0	drew with	Albert-park 0	Royal Park (crowd: 300)
Saturday, 9 July	Albert-park 2	def.	South Yarra 1	Emerald Hill Ground (crowd: 450)
Saturday, 16 July	Melbourne 0	drew with	Albert-park 0	Melbourne Ground (crowd: 2,500)
Saturday, 23 July	Albert-park 0	drew with	Carlton 0	Emerald Hill Ground (crowd: 3,000)
Saturday, 6 August (cancelled due to rain)	Hobson's Bay Railway	v	Albert-park	Lonsdale Ground
Saturday, 13 August	Albert-park 1	drew with	Carlton 1	Emerald Hill Ground (crowd: 2,000)
Saturday, 20 August	South Yarra 0	def. by	Albert-park 2	Melbourne Ground (crowd: 2,500)
In its match against Melbourne on 4 June, Albert Park scored a goal in the first half, but it was later annulled after a head count discovered that Albert-park had 22 men on the field. The game ended in a 0–0 draw.

=== Premiership ===
Although it had claimed the Challenge Cup and was undefeated during the season, Albert-park was not recognised as premier club for 1870: instead, Melbourne, which was also undefeated, was the premier.

While Melbourne had a very similar record to Albert-park, the two matches between them were drawn, with Melbourne having a better head-to-head record against third-placed Carlton: Melbourne had played four matches against Carlton for two wins and two draws, while Albert-park's three matches against Carlton were drawn (their three wins coming against the winless South Yarra).

Albert-park's claim to the Challenge Cup was helped in large part by the fact that it was the first team to play against South Yarra during the year; had South Yarra played its first game against Melbourne, Melbourne would have been in a strong position to win the Challenge Cup as well as the premiership.

=== Senior results ===
The following table shows the five clubs' senior results during the year: all matches played among the five Challenge Cup teams, plus matches that Melbourne played against the Police and against the 18th Royal Irish Regiment. Albert-park's disputed walkover victory against Railway is not included in the table.

Pos	Team	Pld	W	L	D
1	Melbourne (P)	11	7	0	4
2	Albert-park	8	3	0	5
3	Carlton	9	2	2	5
–	South Yarra	5	0	5	0
–	Hobson's Bay Railway	3	0	3	0

(P) Premiers

== Notable events ==
- The practice of stopping play at half-time and changing ends was first introduced in the game between Melbourne and Carlton on 11 June. Prior to this, teams had changed ends after each goal was scored.
