= Junction Oval =

Cricket venue in St Kilda, Victoria

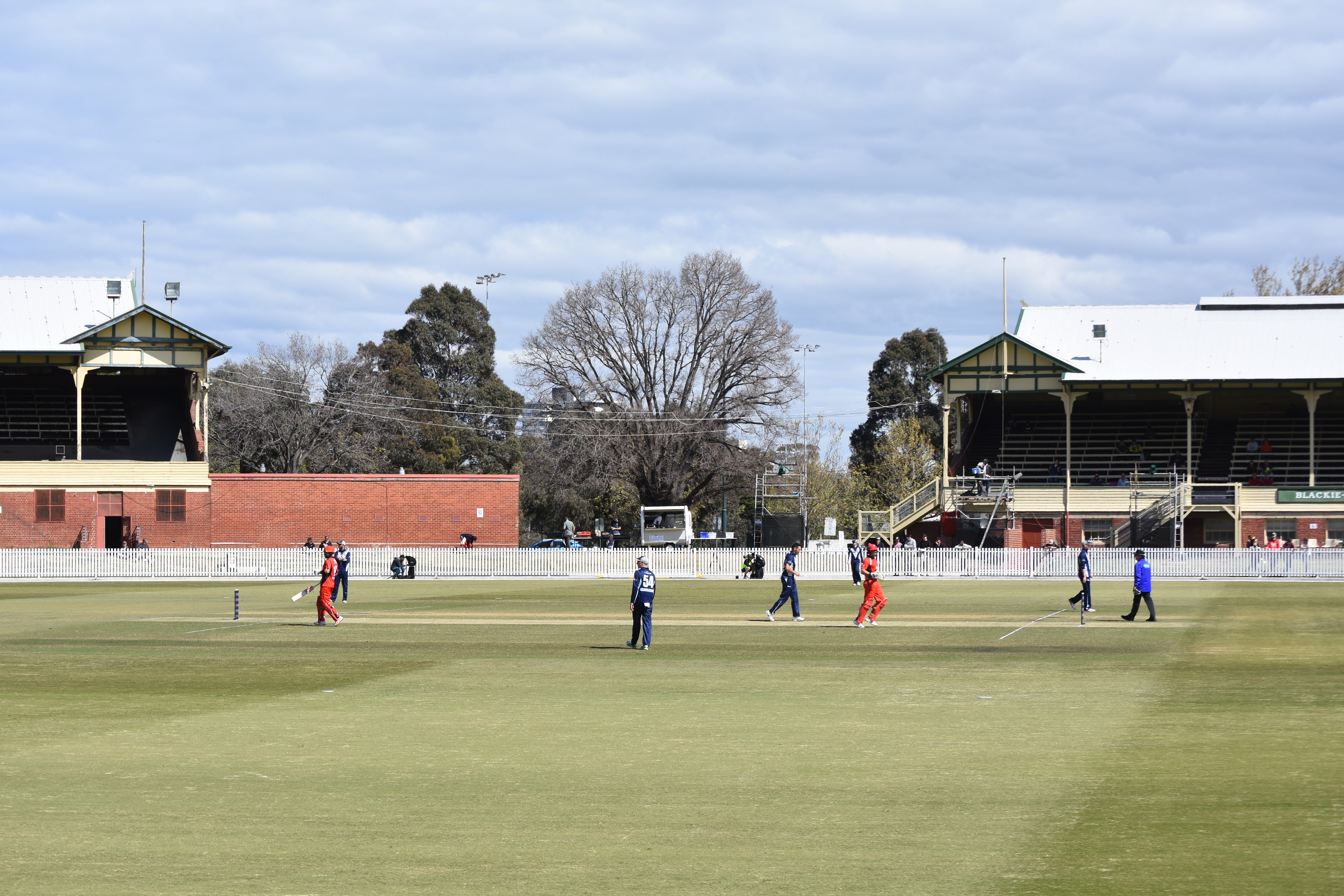
- Junction Oval in September 2018
- Interactive map of Junction Oval
- Full name: CitiPower Centre (naming rights)
- Former names: St Kilda Cricket Ground
- Location: St Kilda, Melbourne, Victoria, Australia
- Coordinates: 37°51′21″S 144°58′48″E
- Owner: Victoria State Government
- Operator: Cricket Victoria
- Capacity: 7,000
- Type: Cricket field
- Surface: Grass
- Record attendance: 46,973 (VFL game, 20 May 1950)
- Field shape: Oval
- Public transit: – Sandringham: Windsor; –; –; –
- Parking: Limited, on-street

Construction
- Opened: 1856; 170 years ago
- Renovated: 2015–2018
- Cost: A$40 million (2015–2018 redevelopment)

Tenants
- Cricket: Victoria cricket team (2018–present); Victoria women's cricket team(2018–present); Melbourne Stars (WBBL; 2018–present); Melbourne Renegades (WBBL; 2018–present); St Kilda Cricket Club (VPC; 1856–present); Melbourne Stars (BBL; 2022–present); Australian rules football: St Kilda Football Club (Challenge Cup/VFA/VFL; 1873–1874, 1886–1915, 1918–1941, 1944–1964); St Kilda/University Football Club (Challenge Cup; 1875); South Melbourne Football Club (VFL; 1944–1946); Fitzroy Football Club (VFL; 1970–1984); Sandringham Football Club (VFA; 1966)

Website
- cricketvictoria.com.au/junction-oval

Ground information
- Tenants: Victoria cricket team

International information
- First women's Test: 21 February 1958: Australia v England
- Last women's Test: 5 February 1972: Australia v New Zealand
- First women's ODI: 9 February 2000: Australia v New Zealand
- Last women's ODI: 14 January 2025: Australia v England
- First women's T20I: 22 January 2013: Australia v New Zealand
- Last women's T20I: 2 March 2020: Bangladesh v Sri Lanka
- As of 14 January 2025; Source: Cricinfo

Victorian Heritage Register
- Official name: St Kilda Cricket Ground
- Type: Registered place
- Designated: 11 February 2010
- Reference no.: H2234
- Heritage overlay no.: HO463
- Category: Recreation and Entertainment
- Architect: E. J. Clark

Junction Oval (known under naming rights as CitiPower Centre and historically referred to as the St Kilda Cricket Ground) is a cricket venue located in the Melbourne suburb of St Kilda. It is the administrative headquarters of Cricket Victoria and hosts a large number of matches for the Victoria men's and women's teams.

The venue was used for Australian rules football between 1870 and 2015, including hosting the first-ever football match with historical senior premiership status. It also hosted most top division Victorian Football Association (VFA) grand finals between 1945 and 1987.

Various elements of the oval – specifically the grassed playing field, the white picket fence, the terraces around the ground, the Kevin Murray Stand, (Note: Renamed as the Shane Warne Stand in 2024.) the Blackie Ironmonger Stand, and the scoreboard – were added to the Victorian Heritage Register on 11 February 2010 in recognition of their historical, architectural and social significance.

== History ==
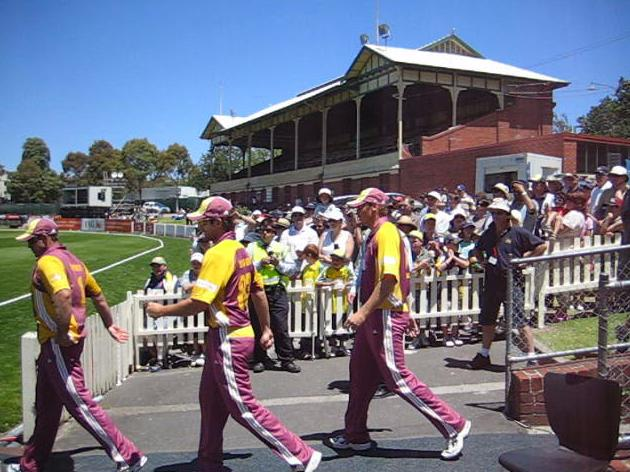
Junction Oval in 2005, taken prior to the redevelopment.

The St Kilda Cricket Ground was established on its present site in 1856. The first grandstand at the ground was purchased from the old Elsternwick racecourse and erected in 1892 at the southern end of the ground. A new grandstand was built in 1925–26 at a cost of A£7,000, designed by E. J. Clark and built by H. H. Eilenberg. It was originally called the G. P. Newman Stand though was renamed the Kevin Murray Stand after one of the Fitzroy Football Club's most famous footballers. The Murray name stood for decades before being the grandstand was again renamed as the Shane Warne Stand in 2024. Warne himself had a long association with the ground, making his first class debut at the ground for Victoria in 1991, and playing there on numerous occasions between 1989 and 2006 for his club side St Kilda. In 2010, the club proposed renaming the ground the Shane Warne Oval, but the change never occurred. In 2013, Warne spoke on behalf of the campaign to preserve the ground's suitability as a venue for first-class cricket.

A second brick stand was also designed by Clark to complement what was then known as the Murray Stand, and was also built by Eilenberg, in 1933–34 at a cost of A£7,500. It was named the Don Blackie–Bert Ironmonger Stand in honour of the St Kilda Cricket Club and Test cricketers. Both grandstands still stand today and have been restored and are in use. A new A£6,000 manual scoreboard and kiosk at the northern end of the ground was built in 1956–57, the cricket club's centenary year. The scoreboard is a landmark of the St Kilda Junction area. The remainder of the ground is grass embankments, other than the southern practice wicket area. Older structures were demolished during a rationalisation of the ground, after they were declared a fire hazard by the Metropolitan Fire Brigade in 1988. It is a very picturesque venue, with a top-quality turf playing area and a modern backdrop of tall buildings and parkland. The current capacity of the ground is 7,000.

In December 2014, the Victorian government announced it would contribute $25 million to the Oval's redevelopment to allow it to become the administrative and training headquarters of Cricket Victoria. By the end of 2015, Cricket Victoria and Cricket Australia, in combination with the Melbourne Cricket Club, contributed the extra $15 million necessary to allow the redevelopment to proceed. The redevelopment of the venue incorporated several new features such as a national centre for cricket training and programs, on-site accommodation for visiting teams and officials, medical and training facilities including an extensive outdoor turf training area and ten-lane indoor centre and administrative facilities and offices to house Cricket Victoria and be rented to external parties. The redevelopment allowed the oval to become a boutique-size alternative venue for first-class cricket with a capacity for up to 7,000 spectators.

The upgraded venue was unveiled ahead of the Sheffield Shield match between Victoria and New South Wales on 3 March 2018. The Melbourne Stars played the first men's Big Bash League match at the venue against the Perth Scorchers on 2 January 2022 as part of their BBL11 Campaign.

Four floodlights were installed around the perimeter of the ground in 2026, enabling night-time matches to be broadcast on television. The lights were originally planned to be installed in time for the Australia women's team one-day international against India in March 2026, though delays in approvals forced the relocation of the match to Hobart. The first night fixture to be held at the ground will a double-header featuring the Melbourne Stars and Melbourne Renegades to open the 2026–27 Women's Big Bash League season.

== Cricket ==
Junction Oval was founded in tandem with the St Kilda Cricket Club, who have called the ground home since its opening in 1856. The club plays in the Victorian Premier Cricket competition and has a rich history of success at the venue. Prior to the redevelopment in 2015–18, the venue had hosted 28 first-class cricket matches, including 25 Sheffield Shield games. The lack of upgrades to the oval meant that by 2005 the venue failed to meet first-class standards, though in retaining its charm it was compared to the Basin Reserve in Wellington (NZ).

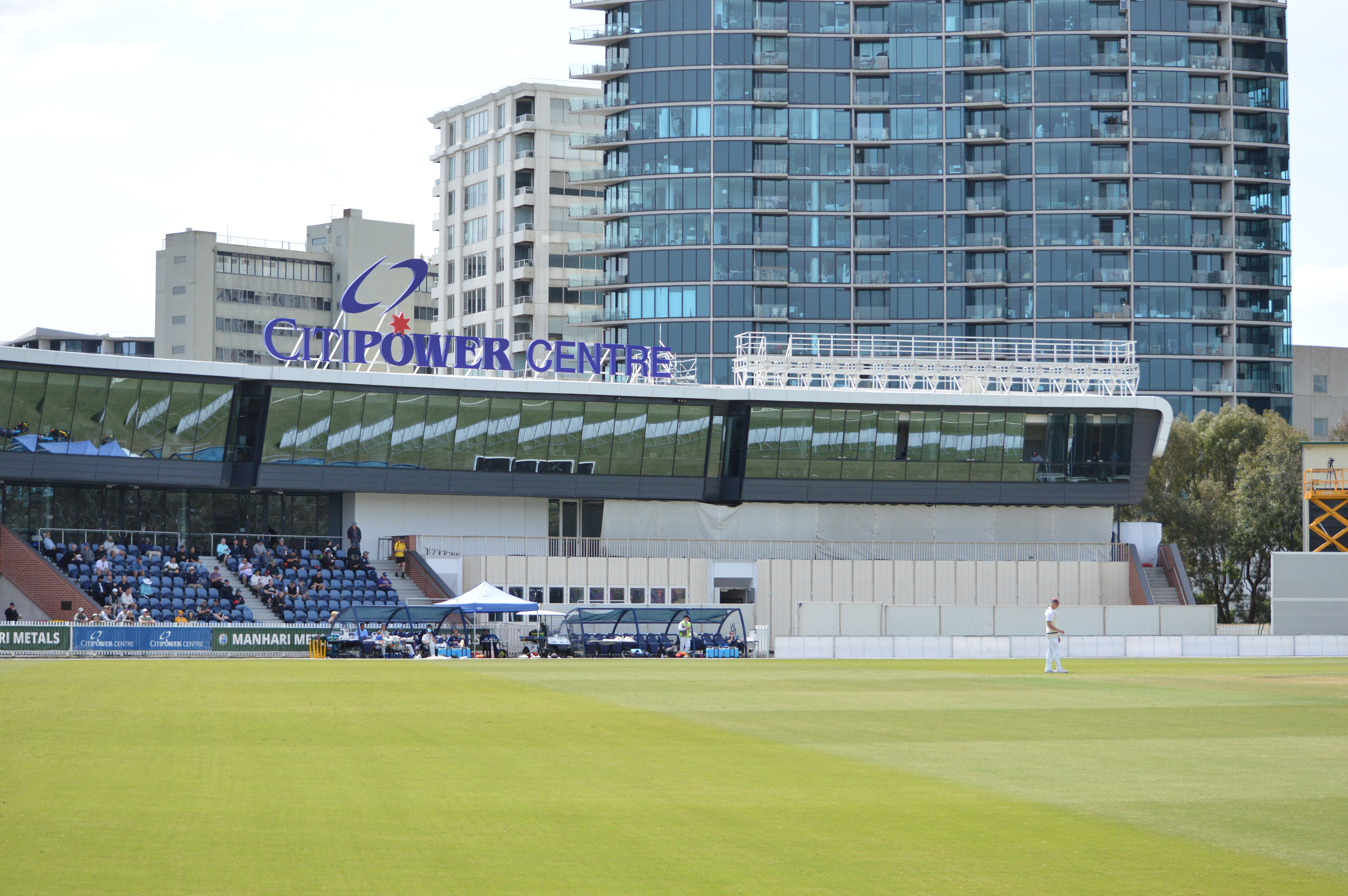
The new grandstand that was constructed in the redevelopment, also the headquarters of Cricket Victoria.

The need for a first-class standard cricket ground in Victoria, in addition to the 100,000 seat capacity Melbourne Cricket Ground (MCG), became increasingly apparent as the state team was forced to host Sheffield Shield finals in interstate locations. Consequently, the redevelopment of the ground in the mid-2010s allowed Victoria and other teams to host matches at an appropriately-sized venue, relieving pressure on the MCG and enabling the oval to become capable of hosting Women's Big Bash League matches and other cricket competitions where necessary, as well as being the administrative headquarters of Cricket Victoria. The venue is referred to as the CitiPower Centre. Prior to redevelopment, Victoria utilised the oval during the 2005–06 season when the MCG was being prepared for the 2006 Commonwealth Games. In the early 1990s it was used regularly because of the construction of the Great Southern Stand at the MCG. It also played host to the 2008/09 Sheffield Shield final, won by the Bushrangers, due to the unavailability of the MCG, because of the Bushfire relief concert.

The Junction Oval was converted into a full-time cricket venue as of 2015 as part of the redevelopment in 2015 until 2018.

As a result of the redevelopment, the Victorian state team plays many home games in the domestic One-Day Cup and Sheffield Shield competitions at the oval. Success at the redeveloped ground came quickly for the Victorians, who won their sixth One-Day Cup and 32nd Sheffield Shield at the Junction Oval during the 2018–19 season.

== Australian rules football ==
While the redevelopment of Junction Oval ended the 145-year association of Australian rules football with the ground, the venue has a rich football history.

On 28 May 1870, the first ever football match with historical senior premiership status was played at the oval between South Yarra and Albert Park, with Albert Park winning by three goals to one.

After entering senior competition, the St Kilda Football Club played its home matches there in 1874 and in 1875, when the club merged with University for one season to form a combined team, St Kilda cum University, due to a lack of players. As St Kilda moved to Alpaca Paddock in 1876 after returning as a standalone team, and a lack of players and financial problems meant that St Kilda went into recess during 1879, no further matches would be played there until St Kilda returned to senior competition in 1886.

St Kilda subsequently played their home games at the venue until 1964 (except for in 1916–17, when the club was in recess due to World War I, and 1942–43, when the military occupied the ground during World War II). Before the 1944 season, the military vacated the Junction Oval, and because it was closer to South Melbourne's still-occupied home ground, the Lake Oval, than Princes Park was, the Swans started playing their home games at the venue: South Melbourne played 29 home matches for premiership points at the ground between 1944 and 1946. Other clubs who used the venue as a home ground included South Melbourne (1944–1946) and Fitzroy (1970–1984), while the first ever women's footy match was played there in 1921.

St Kilda Football Club played 564 home matches for premiership points at the ground between 1897 and 1964. The Saints' final home game at the venue was on 22 August 1964, a 12-point win against Geelong, 12.18 (90) to 11.12 (78), in front of 37,100 fans. The club also played 16 away games at the venue: 13 against Fitzroy and three against South Melbourne.

The St Kilda Football Club left the venue after the 1964 season and moved to Moorabbin Oval, motivated by the desire to operate its own venue.

In 1970, the Fitzroy Football Club relocated to the venue and stayed until the end of 1984. Fitzroy played 135 home matches for premiership points at the ground between 1970 and 1984. Fitzroy were evicted from the venue at the end of 1984 after a fifteen-year tenure, and moved their primary training and administrative base to Northcote Park and their home games to Victoria Park, sharing the venue with Collingwood Football Club.

The final VFL game to be played at the Junction Oval was between St Kilda Football Club and Fitzroy Football Club in front of a crowd attendance of 15,156 on 1 September 1984 in Round 22 of 1984: Fitzroy defeated St Kilda by 57 points, 24.20 (164) to St Kilda 15.17 (107).

The ground also hosted six VFL finals matches, including three Grand Finals (in 1898–1899 and 1944, all three being won by Fitzroy).

Between 1870 and 1984, 845 senior matches in the recognised top level of Victorian football – 12 in the unaffiliated era, 99 in the VFA and 734 in the VFL/AFL – were played at the ground over 93 seasons of competition.

Junction Oval was also a regular venue for Victorian Football Association finals following the Second World War: it staged every top division VFA finals series, including Grand Finals, from 1945 until 1962, in 1966, and from 1970 until 1987. The Sandringham Football Club played home games at the ground during the 1966 season.

The Melbourne Football Club used the venue as a training ground and administrative base between 1985 and 2010, having previously trained at the Melbourne Cricket Ground, and the annual 3RRR Community Cup football match was played there until 2007.

The last football tenant was the Victorian Amateur Football Association's Old Melburnians Football Club from 1992 to 2015, and they took on Old Caulfield Grammarians in the final Australian rules football match to be played at the Junction Oval on 22 July 2015.

St Kilda Football Club Home VFL Match Record at the Junction Oval (St Kilda Cricket Ground)
Venue	Played	Won	Lost	Drawn	Most Recent Home Match
Junction Oval	564 ~	250 (44.33%)	310 (54.96%)	4 (0.71%)	1964 Premiership Season Round 18
1897 to 1964

South Melbourne Football Club Home Match Record at the Junction Oval (St Kilda Cricket Ground)
Venue	Played	Won	Lost	Drawn	Most Recent Home Match
Junction Oval	29 -	20 (68.97%)	9 (31.03)	0 (0%)	1946 Premiership Season Round 19
1944 to 1946

Fitzroy Football Club Home Match Record at the Junction Oval (St Kilda Cricket Ground)
Venue	Played	Won	Lost	Drawn	Most Recent Home Match
Junction Oval	135 -	75 (55.56%)	59 (43.70%)	1 (0.74%)	1984 Premiership Season Round 22
1970 to 1984

=== Record attendances ===
The record attendance at the ground is 46,973 on 20 May 1950 to watch St Kilda play Carlton in a VFL match, a bigger crowd than any of the three Grand Finals played at the venue.

The record attendance for a South Melbourne home game at the Junction Oval was 38,000 against Richmond in 1946.

The record attendance for a Fitzroy home game was 27,202 versus Collingwood in the opening round of 1981.

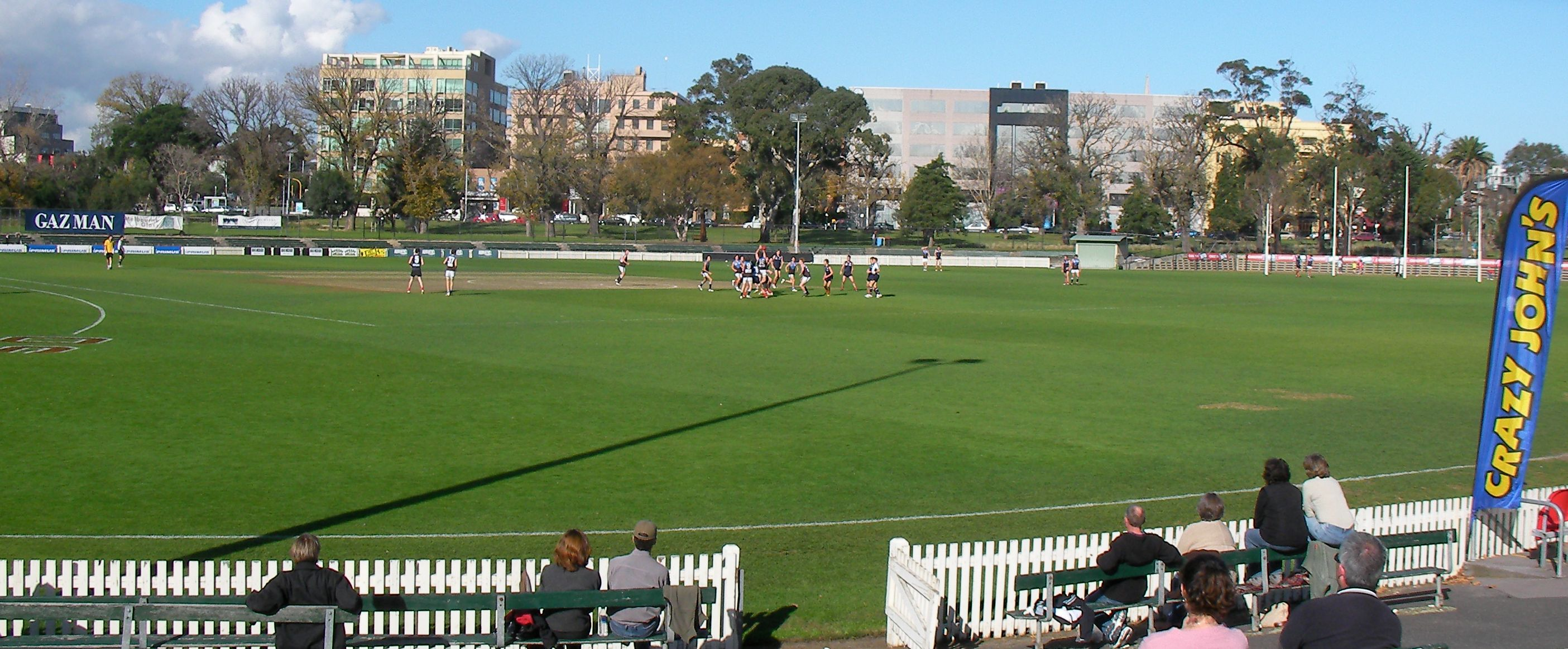
A VAFA match featuring Old Melburnians at the Junction Oval looking towards Fitzroy Street from the hill on the outer

== Other sports ==
On 3 March 1975, one of the greatest heavyweight boxers of all time, "Smokin" Joe Frazier, defeated Jimmy Ellis via technical knockout in the 9th round of their scheduled 12 round fight at the Junction Oval, "to barge squarely back into contention for Muhammad Ali's world heavyweight title." It was the second time Ellis had fought Frazier; Frazier had won their first fight. Other major events that have been held at the ground include the 1898/99 Victorian athletics titles, numerous bicycle meets and two inter-colonial lacrosse matches between Victoria and New South Wales. A pre-season rugby league trial match between Western Suburbs and Manly Warringah was staged at the oval in 1978 notable for being the start of the Fibros vs Silvertails rivalry shared between the two sides.
