= Michael Malouf =

Australian businessman and sports administrator

Michael Kevin Malouf AM (born 5 November 1953) is an Australian business executive.

== Administration career ==
Malouf most recent tenure was being CEO at VicRoads from 2018 to March 2019.

He was the CEO of the Carlton Football Club from 2003 until 2007. In March 2007, it was announced that Malouf stepped down as CEO of Carlton and former CEO at the Collingwood Football Club, Greg Swann, would replace Malouf in this position.

He has previously was chief executive officer of City of Melbourne Council, Australia. Prior to his Melbourne role, Malouf was the chief executive officer of the City of Greater Geelong from 1995 to 1997, and before that held a similar position for the City of Wyndham. He holds a Master of Business Administration from Deakin University, Australia. Malouf was the managing director of Barwon Water from 2007 to 2012.

Malouf was appointed a Member of the Order of Australia in the 2020 Australia Day Honours.
