= Walkover =

Automatic victory by a contestant

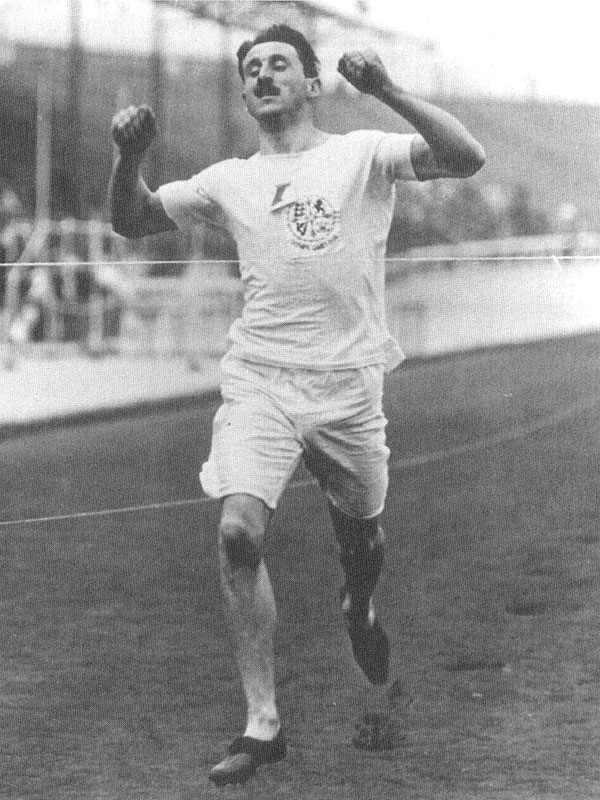
Wyndham Halswelle won the 1908 Olympic gold medal for men's 400 metres running in a walkover. American John Carpenter was disqualified, prompting his teammates John Baxter Taylor and William Robbins to refuse to race in protest.

A walkover, also W.O. or w/o (originally two words: "walk over"), is a victory awarded to a player or team in a contest, if there are no opponents available, or they have been disqualified, because the other contestants have forfeited or the other contestants have withdrawn from the contest. The term can apply in sport, elections or other contexts where a victory can be achieved by default. The narrow and extended meanings of "walkover" as a single word are both found from 1829. Other sports-specific variations of the term exist, especially where walking is not involved: competitive rowing, for example, uses the term row over.

== Sports ==
The word originates from horseracing in the United Kingdom, where an entrant in a one-horse race run under Jockey Club rules had at least to "walk over" the course before being awarded victory. This outcome was quite common at a time when there was no guaranteed prize money for horses finishing second or third, so there was no incentive to run a horse in a race it could not win. The 18th-century champion racehorse Eclipse was so dominant over his contemporaries that he was allowed to walk over on nine occasions, and the 1828 Epsom Derby winner Cadland walked over on at least six occasions. The full formality of walking (or otherwise riding) over the entire track in a one-horse race remained in the rules governing racing until 2006; it was replaced by the lesser formality of making correct weight and riding past the judge's box to be declared the winner. In March 2025 the British Horseracing Authority changed the rules for horse races in Great Britain to allow a sole remaining runner in race to be declared the winner without having to travel to the racecourse.

Similarly, in drag racing, if all (in case of contests with up to four participants) opponents are unable to participate in a round ("competition single"), an opponent leaves/launches before the Christmas Tree is activated at the starting line, or if an odd number of cars not in a power of two results in the use of a bye run, the opposing driver only needs to stage the car under its own power to automatically win once the tree is activated. This happened at World Wide Technology Raceway in 2023, when Jordan Lazic won in Pro Modified after his opponent Jason Scruggs' car failed to show up for the final round. Lazic took the green light and backed the car after shutting it down. In 2025, Greg Anderson defeated Dallas Glenn at Firebird Motorsports Park after his car broke and Glenn's car left before the tree was activated. Anderson did not finish, but was declared winner by walkover. In the NHRA, a walkover is scored "No time, took green light".

The actual act of "walking over" was seen in Australian rules football matches during the 19th and early 20th centuries: it was not uncommon in the 19th century for a scheduled match to be cancelled on the day, often due to one of the two teams failing to field enough players, but these were generally cancelled or rescheduled.

The first team to claim victory by walkover on such an occasion was Albert-park, in an 1870 match against Railway which was to have counted towards the Challenge Cup. Railway had only 14 players turn up and declined to play, so the Albert-park team took to the field with the umpire and without opposition and put through two goals before claiming a walkover victory. The claimed victory and its impact on the Challenge Cup was controversial and widely disputed by the other clubs: one sportswriter at the time commented that "in connection with football, the idea of a walkover is simply absurd and unprecedented." Nevertheless, actual walkovers were thereafter often observed in similar circumstances: the umpire would bounce the ball to officially start the game, the unopposed team would score at least once to secure a lead, and the match would then be abandoned. One other occurrence of a walkover was in a Victorian Football Association match in 1900, and sporadic reports from games at the local level confirm that actual walkovers were observed as late as the 1930s, including outside Melbourne.

In the 1908 Summer Olympics, there was a walkover for a gold medal by Wyndham Halswelle in the rerun of the final race of the 400 m: Hallswelle's two American opponents refused to participate in the rerun, protesting the controversial disqualification of their teammate. Hallswelle jogged in the rerun alone to claim the gold medal.

In the 1920 Summer Olympics sailing program, there were a total of sixteen different yacht classes – no other Olympic games sailed more than seven classes until the 1980s – spreading the competitors so thinly that there were six gold medals won by walkover: each of these yachts completing its course unopposed to claim gold. A seventh yacht, Francis Richards' entrant in the 18' dinghy, also attempted a walkover but did not finish; this crew is officially recognized as gold medalists by the International Olympic Committee, but it was not mentioned in the most official contemporary report by games organizers, casting doubt over whether or not the crew actually received gold medals at the time due to not finishing the course. In addition to the walkovers, two of the sixteen classes were cancelled due to there being no entrants.

A walkover occurred in the 2020 Summer Olympics in sport climbing. French climber Bassa Mawem was injured in his last climb during qualification and was unable to compete in the finals, but IFSC rules did not allow him to be replaced. His opening round speed climbing opponent in the finals, Czech climber Adam Ondra, was made to race unopposed up the wall to advance.

A walkover was observed in football in the second leg of the 1974 FIFA World Cup qualification playoff between the Soviet Union and Chile. The Soviet Union refused to play in Chile two months after the 1973 Chilean coup d'état, and FIFA awarded the game to Chile by a nominal 2–0 result; but the walkover itself was still staged, the Chilean team taking the field and captain Francisco Valdés scoring an unopposed goal in front of a crowd of 15,000.

In a more general sense, the term "walkover" is used broadly across many sports for a forfeiture due to one team being unable or unwilling to play, even if no actual act of walking over occurs. In some instances, there are distinctions between walkovers and other victories by default: for example, in tennis a walkover occurs when a player withdraws prior to the match, but not when a player retired due to injury during a match. Many sporting bodies have a nominal score applied in the case of walkover for the purposes of points differential tiebreakers; the 2019 Pan American Games women's basketball tournament, for example, awarded a 20–0 walkover victory to Colombia when their Argentinian opponents turned up with the wrong uniforms. Colloquially, an extremely one-sided game may also be called a 'walkover', implying a similar score could have been achieved without the losing team's presence.

== Other uses ==
In poker games that use blinds, a hand is considered a walkover (usually shortened to walk) when no other players call or raise the big blind, resulting in the player who posted the big blind winning the hand without opposition. Walks are most often seen in tournament play, since cash games often allow the players to "split the blinds" (i.e. take back their blind bets in case there are no callers or raisers by the time the action gets to the small blind). This is not permitted in tournaments.

=== Political use ===
An uncontested election is often referred to as a walkover, when it is also referred to as winning "by default".

The word is used more generally by extension for an election in which the winner is not the only candidate, but is also used when no opponent has a credible chance of victory.
