= Greg Swann =

Australian sports administrator

Greg Swann (born 1962) is an Australian Football League (AFL) administrator and former CEO of multiple AFL clubs, including the Brisbane Lions, Collingwood Football Club and Carlton Football Club. As of July 2025, he is the AFL Executive General Manager of Football Performance.

== Sports administration career ==
From 1995 until 1998, he was the president of VFA/VFL club Williamstown, presiding over the club during the VSFL attempt to force the club into a merger with Werribee at the end of 1995; he had previously played about 100 games for Williamstown during the 1980s.

=== Collingwood Football Club ===
Swann was previously Chief Executive Officer (CEO) of the Collingwood Football Club from 1999 until 2007. Swann in his tenure as CEO of Collingwood, oversaw improved on-field results after lifting Collingwood up from the bottom of the ladder, the previous years, by being a strong supporter of club president Eddie McGuire, club senior coach Mick Malthouse and club captain Nathan Buckley. Swann in his tenure as CEO of Collingwood Football Club, also oversaw Collingwood's two grand final losses in the 2002 Grand Final and 2003 Grand Final, both times to Brisbane Lions. Swann in his tenure as CEO of Collingwood in the off-field position area, also oversaw the development and construction of the club's new training and administrative facilities at the Lexus Centre and Olympic Park in 2004. On 23 March 2007, Swann stepped down as CEO of Collingwood Football Club.

=== Carlton Football Club ===
Swann was also previously the CEO of Carlton Football Club. On 23 March 2007, former Carlton Football Club CEO Michael Malouf stood down and it was announced that Swann would be Malouf's immediate replacement. Swann in his tenure as CEO of Carlton, oversaw the trade of Chris Judd from West Coast Eagles to Carlton. Swann in his tenure as CEO of Carlton also oversaw the club prosper in the on and off field performances. Off the field, Swann witnessed the club's membership increase with the total revenue of the club that also increased from $18 million in 2006 to $57 million in 2013, while Carlton’s historical debt was also significantly reduced. Under Swann’s guidance, Carlton was also able to secure long-term deals with key major sponsors and build strong relationships with global brands including Hyundai, Mars and Nike. Furthermore, Swann led the way in the redevelopment of the $18 million training facility that opened at Visy Park in 2010, working closely with federal, state and local governments, along with the AFL, to deliver a world-class training and administration facility. The on-field performance also witnessed successful results for the club where under Swann’s leadership as CEO, after finishing at second from the bottom of the ladder in 2007, Carlton managed to play finals in four out of five seasons in his tenure. Swann served as CEO of Carlton until 22 June 2014, electing to step down at the same time as club president Stephen Kernahan handed over his position to Mark LoGiudice.

=== Brisbane Lions ===
In July 2014, Swann was appointed CEO of Brisbane Lions. Swann in his tenure as CEO of Brisbane Lions oversaw the period at the club, where the Lions had dark periods where there was poor-on field performance and financially off-field struggles as well. The club then had to keep going to the AFL to get additional funding. The situation at the club, then slowly turned around with improved successful on-field results and a return to a stable position off-field. Swann in his tenure as CEO of Brisbane Lions also oversaw the development and construction of the club's new training and administrative facility at The Reserve, Springfield.

=== AFL Executive ===
In June 2025, it was announced that Swann would join the AFL as the new Executive General Manager Football Performance. Swann commenced the position in July 2025 as part of a change in the AFL Executive's structure that saw the head of Football Operations position, previously held by Laura Kane, split into two functions. As part of the change, the AFL announced Swann would be responsible for the "on-field football product". This would include the Match Review Panel (MRO), Umpiring, Game Analysis, Player Movement, Laws of the Game, innovation and increased engagement to clubs, coaches and players.

== Personal life ==
He attended Wesley College (Melbourne, Australia).
