= Albert Park Football Club (VFA) =

Australian rules football club

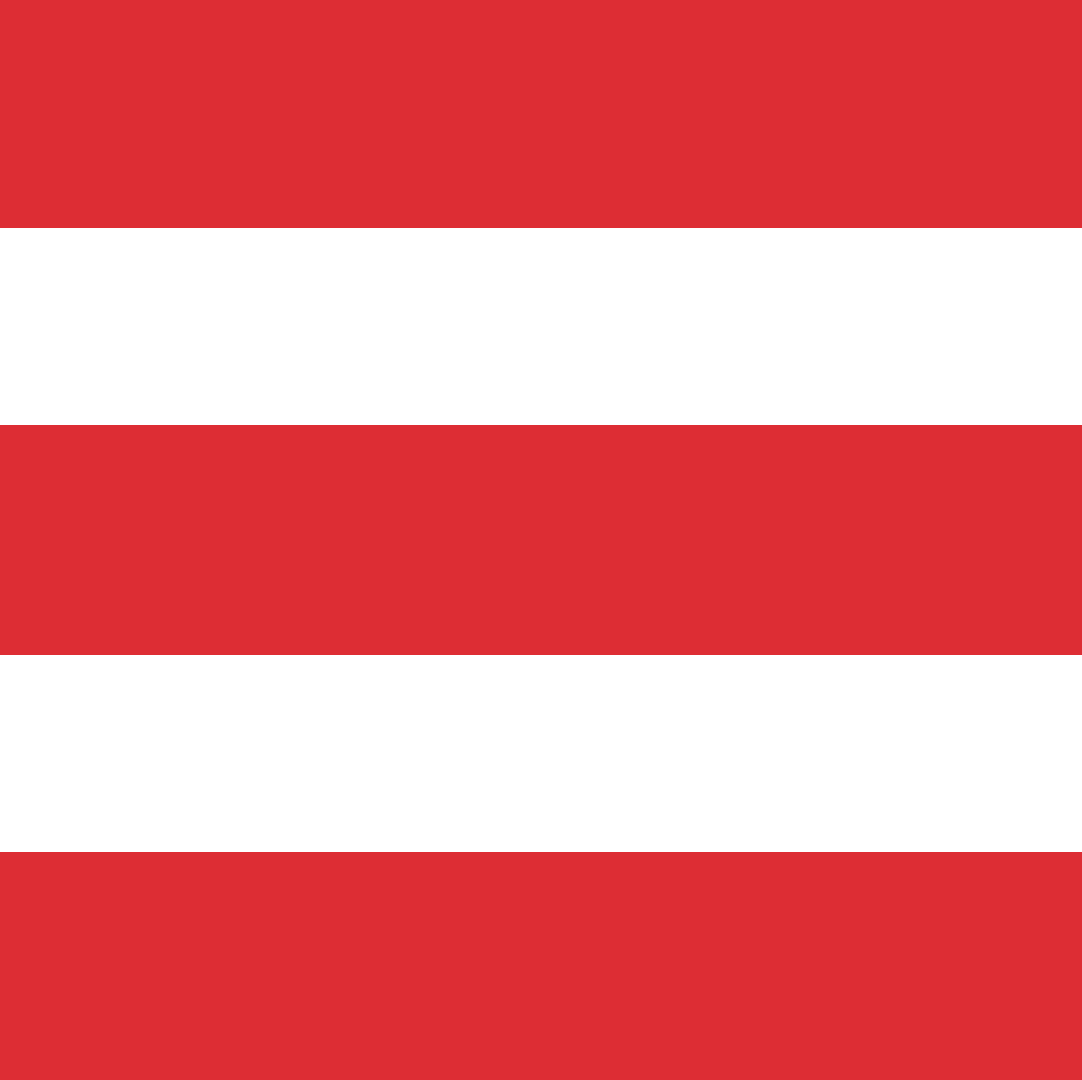

Names
- Full name: Albert Park Football Club
- Nickname(s): Parkites, Hillites

Club details
- Founded: 1867
- Dissolved: 1880
- Colours: White Red
- Competition: Victorian Football Association (1877–1879)
- Premierships: Challenge Cup; 1870 (disputed)
- Ground: Emerald Hill Ground; South Melbourne Cricket Ground

The Albert Park Football Club (historically styled as Albert-park) was a 19th-century Australian rules football club based in the Melbourne suburb of Albert Park. The club was one of the main first-rate senior football clubs during the unaffiliated era of Victorian football.

Albert Park was a founding senior member of the Victorian Football Association (VFA) in 1877, before amalgamating with neighbouring South Melbourne (now known as Sydney) in 1880.

A newer, unrelated club called the Albert Park Football Club currently competes in the Victorian Amateur Football Association (VAFA).

== History ==
=== Early years ===
The club was established as the South Melbourne Football Club in May 1867. It changed its name to Emerald-hill in April 1868, then to Albert-park in May 1869. It played its home games at the Emerald-hill Ground.

The club quickly became one of the main senior clubs competing at the time. The best performance in its history was in the 1870 season; it was undefeated, but it finished second for the premiership behind Melbourne, which was also undefeated.

=== 1870 Challenge Cup ===
The club also claimed the South Yarra Presentation Challenge Cup during the 1870 season, although the claim was disputed by the other clubs: rules required that a club was to win four cup matches without loss to claim permanent ownership of the Cup, but the other clubs disputed Albert-park's right to claim a walkover victory against Railway when the latter club declined to play a scheduled game due to only fourteen players turning up. In claiming the walkover, Albert-park players took to the field against no opposition and scored two goals, in a similar manner to the traditional ceremony of an unopposed horse "walking over" the track to claim a walkover victory, something one sportswriter described at the time as "simply absurd and unprecedented," but which later became common practice in the event of such a forfeiture.

=== Early rules, VFA and amalgamations ===
In May of 1874 the Albert Park club made a failed attempt to have local football changed from Victorian rules to rugby union instead.

In 1876, the club entered an amalgamation with North Melbourne, but the amalgamation ended one year later when North Melbourne was re-established as an independent club under the name Hotham.

In 1877, Albert-park was a founding senior member of the Victorian Football Association.

In 1880, Albert-park amalgamated with the neighbouring South Melbourne, which had joined the VFA as a senior club in 1879, to create a new club under South Melbourne's name that retained Albert-park's red and white colours and were based at Albert-park's home ground of Lake Oval. The merged club went on to dominate metropolitan football during the 1880s and early 1890s, winning five premierships in ten years, and exists today as the professional Sydney Swans in the Australian Football League.
