= Hobson's Bay Railway Football Club =

Names
- Nickname: Railway

Club details
- Founded: 1867
- Dissolved: 1870
- Competition: Unaffiliated
- Premierships: None
- Ground: Lonsdale Cricket Ground

Hobson's Bay Railway Football Club was a short-lived 19th-century Australian rules football club. Active between 1867 and 1870, the club was notable for being among the five clubs to contest the first season of senior premiership football in Victoria.

== History ==
During the 1860s, football in Melbourne was dominated by four principal senior clubs. Later in the decade, several small football clubs were formed among the employees of different major companies and services, including the public transport services, police and armed regiments, competing at what would later be considered a junior level. The Hobson's Bay Railway club was among these, representing employees of the Melbourne & Hobson's Bay Railway Company. The club was largely based around Richmond, and its home games and scratch matches were played on the Lonsdale Cricket Ground.

Railway's earliest reported match was played at odds against South Melbourne in August 1867, resulting in a 0–2 defeat. The club was active at junior level over the next two years, playing matches against other minor clubs or the second twenties of the major clubs. In its season retrospective for the 1868 season, the Australasian newspaper made mention of the Railway club among a list of minor clubs, noting "I am not aware that they have been very prominent in the field this season, and they do not call for any special remark." In 1869, the same newspaper identified the club as the strongest among the city's non-principal clubs; the club played seven games in 1869, winning four and drawing two, and was of sufficient prominence that it was invited to the pre-season meeting of the principal club secretaries.

In 1870, the club began arranging fully fledged senior games against the other principal clubs in what is now considered the first premiership season of senior Victorian football. The club was well short of the standard of the other principal clubs, playing three games and suffering heavy losses in all. However, its season was most notable for a match it didn't play: in a match arranged for the Challenge Cup against Albert-park on 11 June, Railway declined to play when only fourteen of its players arrived; but rather than cancelling the game, Albert-park controversially claimed a walkover victory – literally taking to the field and scoring two unopposed goals – and counted it towards the four consecutive matches it was required to win to claim permanent ownership of the cup, a position disputed by all of the other clubs.

There are no reports of the Hobson's Bay Railway club continuing in senior or junior level football beyond the end of the 1870 season.
