= Challenge Cup (Australian rules football) =

The Challenge Cup was the name of several football trophies contested in Melbourne, Australia, during the 1860s and 1870s under the Melbourne Football Club rules and the Victorian rules (which were early versions of Australian rules football).

== History ==
Football in Victoria was played under an informal administrative structure prior to the formation of the Victorian Football Association in 1877. As such, any trophies or competitions were unofficial, and were arranged entirely at the agreement of the participating clubs. Trophies were either purchased by the clubs or donated by a third party.

There were three Challenge Cups which were contested among the top senior metropolitan clubs between 1861 and 1871:

- the Caledonian Society Challenge Cup (1861–1864),
- the Athletic Sports Committee Challenge Cup (1865–1866), and
- the South Yarra Presentation Challenge Cup (1870–1871).

The Challenge Cup, which was won and held based on the results of specific games, was separate from the premiership (which is considered to have officially existed from 1870), which was based on a club's results in all games during a season.

=== Caledonian Society Challenge Cup ===
The inaugural football Challenge Cup was a silver cup donated by the Royal Caledonian Society of Melbourne. It was initially put up as the prize for a football match between University and a team of challengers which was to have been played during the Society's Caledonian games on 28 December 1861.

The game was attempted, but abandoned well short of its full length as there was inadequate space among the other Caledonian games events to accommodate a football game. The cup itself was nevertheless presented to University.

In May 1862, the same cup was put up as a prize in a scheduled match between University and the Melbourne Football Club, but the game was twice postponed due to University having insufficient players to field a team. Melbourne claimed that University had forfeited the match and that it should take ownership of the cup, but University rejected this and remained in possession. The matter was finally resolved on-field in 1863, when Melbourne defeated University 2–1 over three afternoons' play in July and August – at that time, matches were untimed and won by the first team to score two goals: the first day's play on 18 July was scoreless, the second day's play on 8 August resulted in one goal to each team, and the winning goal was scored after half an hour's play on 22 August.

Thereafter, the cup was put up by Melbourne as a perpetual prize to be contested in all matches between the holder and a challenger. As was commonplace with trophies in many sports at the time, the cup would remain a perpetual prize until won three times consecutively by the same team, at which point permanent possession would pass to that team.

Only three more matches were played for the Caledonian Society Cup, all won by Geelong:

- On 12 September 1863, Geelong challenged and Melbourne defeated them 2–0 to claim the cup.
- On 24 May 1864, University challenged Geelong and was defeated 2–0.
- On 27 August 1864, South Yarra challenged Geelong and was defeated 2–0.

Thus, Geelong became the permanent owner of the Calendonian Society Challenge Cup.

=== Athletic Sports Committee Challenge Cup ===
In 1865, the Athletic Sports Committee put up a new Challenge Cup trophy, valued at ten guineas. As with the previous trophy, any match between the holder of the trophy and a challenger would be played for the trophy, matches would be played on the ground of the holder, and the first club to win the cup three times consecutively (with an unlimited number of drawn matches in that streak) would become its permanent owner. The Athletic Sports Committee could be called upon to resolve disputes.

Matches played during 1865 for the cup were as follows:

- 24 May 1865 – Melbourne defeated Geelong 2–1.
- 17 June 1865 – match drawn. South Yarra led Melbourne 1–0 when the time was called on the first day; since Melbourne had already accepted a subsequent challenge from Royal Park, it was unclear whether the match should resume or be drawn. The Athletic Sports Committee ultimately decided that the unfinished game would not be resumed and a draw was declared.
- 15 July 1865 – match drawn. Royal Park led Melbourne 1–0 when time was called.
- 22 and 29 July 1865 – match drawn. South Yarra drew Melbourne 1–1. This match was allowed to run over two afternoons as the second day had been scheduled in advance.
- 5 August 1865 – University defeated Melbourne 2–1. University was viewed as a minor opponent, and many of Melbourne's best players were either absent or played for University in the game, resulting in an unexpected win to University.
- 19 and 26 August 1865 – South Yarra defeated University 2–0. After the first day's play, South Yarra led 1–0 and the match was to have ended in a draw; but after Geelong withdrew its challenge to play University on 26 August, University controversially decided to resume the game against South Yarra instead of begin a new game against its next challenger.
- 2 September 1865 – match drawn. South Yarra led Royal Park 1–0 when time was called.
- 9 September 1865 – South Yarra defeated Carlton 2–0.
- 16 September 1865 – Melbourne defeated South Yarra 2–0.

Prior to the 1866 season, the Athletic Sports Committee made adjustments to the rules relating to Cup matches:

- Firstly, to eliminate the inconsistencies relating to the length of matches, all matches that were not completed on the day they commenced would be declared drawn.
- Secondly, clubs were not allowed to arrange a new challenge match until all other willing clubs had also had the opportunity to challenge, except that the club which held the cup at the start of the season automatically had the right to issue the final challenge of the year.
- Thirdly, players were not allowed to play for more than one club in cup matches during the season: this eliminated the issue that had seen Melbourne players augmenting the University team that defeated Melbourne to win the cup in 1865.

While another rule had called for matches to start promptly at 2 pm, to prevent the holder of the cup from delaying the start of a match to reduce the time available for the challenger to score two goals, this rule was repeatedly broken over the following year by South Yarra, which was often up to an hour late, drawing considerable bad will towards the club. Matches played during 1866 were:

- 2 June 1866 – South Yarra defeated Melbourne 2–0.
- 9 June 1866 – match drawn. South Yarra drew Carlton 0–0.
- 14 July 1866 – match drawn. Melbourne led South Yarra 1–0 when time was called.
- 4 August 1866 – match drawn. Carlton led South Yarra 1–0 when time was called.
- 25 August 1866 – match drawn. South Yarra drew Melbourne 1–1.
- 1 September 1866 – match drawn. South Yarra drew Carlton 1–1.
- 8 September 1866 – South Yarra defeated Royal Park 2–0.
- 15 September 1866 – South Yarra defeated Melbourne 2–0; although all players, including the goalkicker, acknowledged that the umpire had erred in awarding South Yarra's second goal, which missed by about a yard.

This gave South Yarra its third consecutive win (with five drawn matches in between), thus giving it permanent possession of the cup. No cup was contested between 1867 and 1869.

The trophy itself – a 20 cm high silver cup inscribed with the words "Champion Football Cup – Presented by the Athletic Sports Committee 1865" – was long thought to have been lost. It resurfaced unexpectedly in 2007, having been inherited by a distant descendant of South Yarra president John Steavenson in Bristol, England. It was subsequently loaned to be put on display at the National Sports Museum.

=== South Yarra Presentation Challenge Cup ===
The South Yarra Football Club decided to purchase and donate a new trophy for competition in 1870. As with the previous cups, it was contested in all matches between the holder and a challenger, but this time a club would be required to win it four times consecutively without defeat (still with no limit on the number of drawn matches) to claim it permanently.

In 1869, the rules of football were changed, with matches being won by the team which scored the most goals in two halves of 50 minutes, rather than by the first team to score twice.

Five clubs contested the Cup during the 1870 season: Melbourne, Carlton, South Yarra, Albert-park and Railway. Albert-park took possession of the trophy from South Yarra in the first game it was contested, and then claimed three wins and five draws from its next eight games to claim permanent ownership of the cup, but South Yarra and other clubs disputed the claim, arguing that the club's second victory, a walk-over after Railway forfeited when only fourteen of its players arrived, should have counted as a cancellation and not a forfeiture. Albert-park ultimately gave the Cup back to South Yarra at the end of the year, but maintained its position that it had won it outright and was making the gift in its capacity as the trophy's owner.

	1870 South Yarra Challenge Cup games
Saturday, 28 May	South Yarra 1	def. by	Albert-park 3	St Kilda Cricket Ground
Saturday, 4 June	Albert-park 0	drew with	Melbourne 0	Emerald Hill Ground (crowd: 1,500)
Saturday, 11 June (walk-over, disputed)	Albert-park	def.	Hobson's Bay Railway	Emerald Hill Ground
Saturday, 18 June	Carlton 0	drew with	Albert-park 0	Royal Park
Saturday, 9 July	Albert-park 2	def.	South Yarra 1	Emerald Hill Ground (crowd: 450)
Saturday, 16 July	Melbourne 0	drew with	Albert-park 0	Melbourne Ground (crowd: 2,500)
Saturday, 23 July	Albert-park 0	drew with	Carlton 0	Emerald Hill Ground (crowd: 3,000)
Saturday, 13 August	Albert-park 1	drew with	Carlton 1	Emerald Hill Ground
Saturday, 20 August	South Yarra 0	def. by	Albert-park 2	Melbourne Ground (crowd: 2,500)

The South Yarra Challenge Cup was again put up for competition again in 1871. While Albert-park declined to contest it, it continued to play senior games against the other clubs. The remaining three clubs – Carlton, Melbourne and South Yarra – decided that each club would play the others three times during the season, and the top two would play a single playoff match for the cup. This meant that the cup was being contested in a league-type competition, and by traditional definitions was no longer a challenge cup with a perpetual holder.

Carlton and Melbourne were clear qualifiers for the final ahead of South Yarra, which was winless: two Carlton-Melbourne matches were postponed by four weeks due to rain, while the two unplayed Carlton-South Yarra matches were scratched.

Carlton won the playoff 2–0 to claim undisputed and permanent ownership of the South Yarra Challenge Cup.

	Playoff match for the South Yarra Challenge Cup
Saturday, 7 October 1871 (3:00 pm)	Carlton	def.	Melbourne	Emerald Hill Ground
	2; 2	Half; Final	0; 0
Clarke, Dedman		Goals

There were no further Challenge Cups contested among the senior metropolitan clubs, with the bitterness arising from repeated disputes over ownership of each cup being a significant factor in this.

=== Other Challenge Cups ===
There were several other challenge cups presented in provincial and junior football. Among them were:

- 1872: junior clubs Collingwood, East Melbourne, Richmond and Southern jointly purchased the Junior Football Club Challenge Cup, with the winner to be determined by a double round-robin tournament during 1872. Richmond won the cup.
- 1874–1875: the first Geelong, Ballarat and Western District Challenge Cup was won by Geelong, for holding the trophy for two successive seasons without sustaining defeat.
- 1875: a Second Twenties' Challenge Cup was played as a double round-robin among the second twenties of the senior clubs, and was won by Carlton Imperial after it defeated Albert-park 1–0 in the final.
- 1876–1877: the second Geelong, Ballarat and Western District Challenge Cup was won by Barwon for winning the most Cup matches during the 1876 and 1877 seasons.
- 1876: a Junior Challenge Cup was contested and won by Williamstown.
