= Carlton Football Club =

Australian rules football club based in Melbourne, Victoria, Australia

Names
- Full name: Carlton Football Club Limited
- Nicknames: Blues; Blue Baggers; Baggers; Old Navy Blues
- Motto: Mens sana in corpore sano (a healthy mind in a healthy body)

2026 season
- After finals: 8th
- Home-and-away season: 10th
- Leading goalkicker: Brodie Kemp (39 goals)

Club details
- Founded: 1864; 162 years ago
- Colours: Navy blue White
- Competition: AFL: Senior men AFLW: Senior women VFL: Reserves men VFLW: Reserves women
- President: Robert Priestley
- CEO: Graham Wright
- Coach: AFL: Josh Fraser; AFLW: Mathew Buck; VFL: Damian Truslove
- Captain(s): AFL: Patrick Cripps; AFLW: Abbie McKay; VFL: TBD
- Premierships: VFL/AFL (16): 1906; 1907; 1908; 1914; 1915; 1938; 1945; 1947; 1968; 1970; 1972; 1979; 1981; 1982; 1987; 1995; VFA (2): 1877; 1887; Victorian (4): 1871; 1873; 1874; 1875
- Ground: AFL: Marvel Stadium (56,347) & Melbourne Cricket Ground (100,024); AFLW & VFL & VFLW: Ikon Park (12,000)
- Former ground: Princes Park (1897–2005)
- Training ground: Princes Park (Ikon Park)

Uniforms
Home	Away	Clash

Other information
- Official website: carltonfc.com.au

The Carlton Football Club, nicknamed the Blues, is a professional Australian rules football club based at Princes Park in Carlton North, an inner suburb of Melbourne in Victoria, Australia. The club competes in the Australian Football League (AFL), the sport's premier competition.

Founded in the 1860s, the club began playing out of parklands historically part of Carlton not far from its current base. It quickly became one of the major football clubs in the city. It was a foundation member of the Victorian Football Association (VFA), winning the inaugural premiership in 1877. In 1896, Carlton joined the breakaway Victorian Football League (since renamed the AFL), and alongside rivals Collingwood, Essendon and Richmond is regarded as one of the league's historical "Big Four" clubs, with 16 VFL/AFL premierships (a joint record with Collingwood and Essendon). The club's AFL Women's team has competed since the league's inaugural 2017 AFLW season.

It currently plays its home matches at Docklands Stadium and the Melbourne Cricket Ground. Princes Park is its traditional home ground of the club and is home to its women's team. Carlton also has reserves sides in the Victorian Football League and VFL Women's.

== Club history ==
=== Early history ===
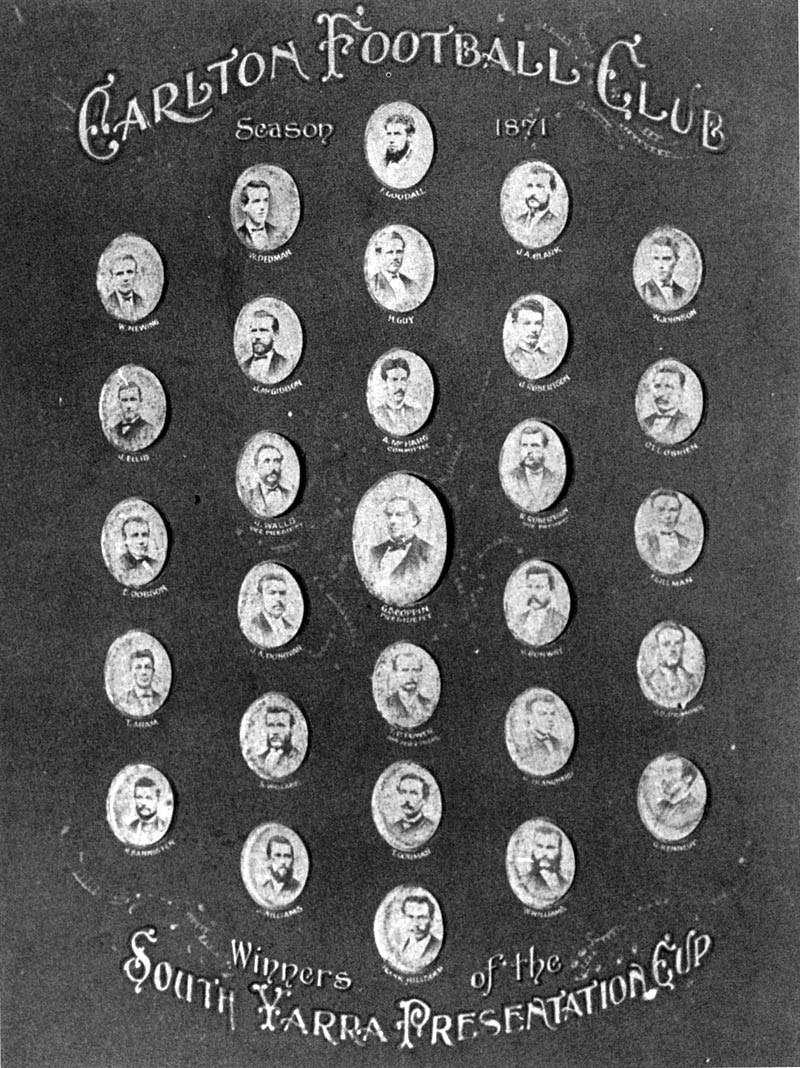
Carlton won the 1871 club season and South Yarra Presentation Cup

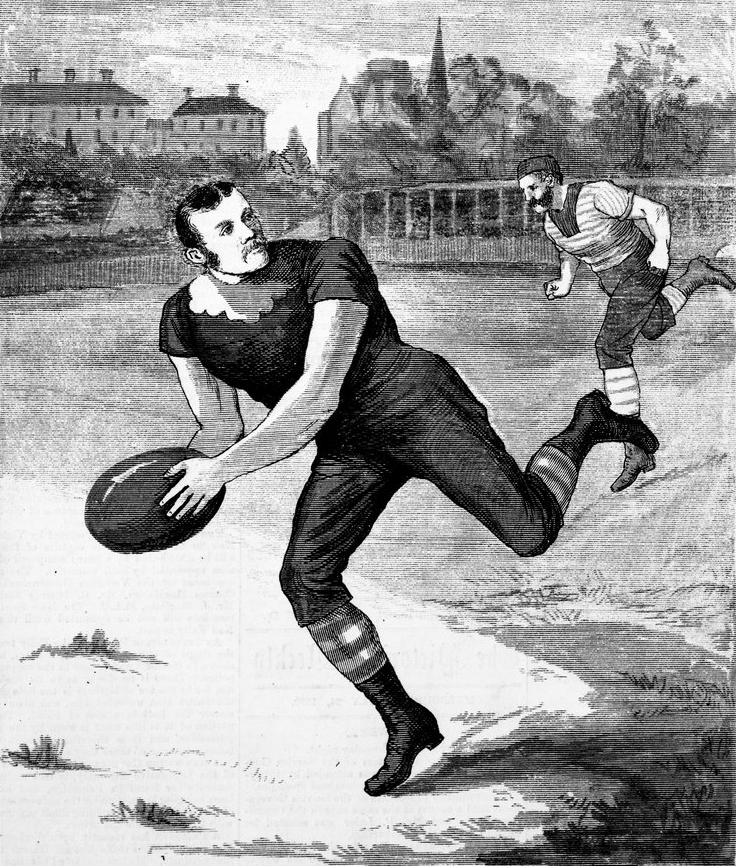
George Coulthard, an early champion Carlton footballer in 1880

During a meeting on 17 May 1865 at the University Hotel in Grattan Street Carlton the Carlton Football Club nominated secretary Ben James and president James Linacre respectively. The club formally adopted the Melbourne Football Club rules. This is the earliest record of incorporation however the club believes it was formed earlier based on numerous indirect accounts and officially celebrates anniversaries based on a foundation date of 1864. It also continues to investigate evidence of an earlier foundation, including the proposed formation of a Carlton Football Club on 21 May 1861 connected to a Carlton Cricket Club.

The earliest records of the club playing were from 1865 out of Princes Park in Carlton.

In the early days, Carlton became particularly strong competitively and grew a large supporter base. It became a fierce rival to the Melbourne Football Club in early competitions, including the South Yarra Challenge Cup, and the club is recognised as senior Victorian premiers in 1871, 1873, 1874 and 1875.

=== Victorian Football Association and Victorian Football League ===
In 1877, Carlton was one of the foundation clubs of the Victorian Football Association, and was a comfortable winner of the premiership in the competition's inaugural season. During this time, Carlton participated in several pioneering cross-code fixtures, playing in 1877 and 1878 a series of alternating-rules matches against Sydney's rugby-playing Waratah FC, and later under Australian rules football defeating the 1888 British Lions and 1888-89 New Zealand Natives rugby teams.

Carlton was one of the first clubs to have a player worthy of the superstar tag: champion player George Coulthard, who played for Carlton between 1876 and 1882, and was noted by The Australasian as 'The grandest player of the day'. He died of tuberculosis in 1883, aged 27.

The club won one more VFA premiership, in 1887, but after that, particularly during the 1890s, the club went from one of the strongest clubs in the Association to one of the weaker, both on-field and off-field. In spite of this, the club was invited to join the breakaway Victorian Football League competition in 1897. The club continued to struggle in early seasons of the new competition, and finished seventh out of eight teams in each of its first five seasons.

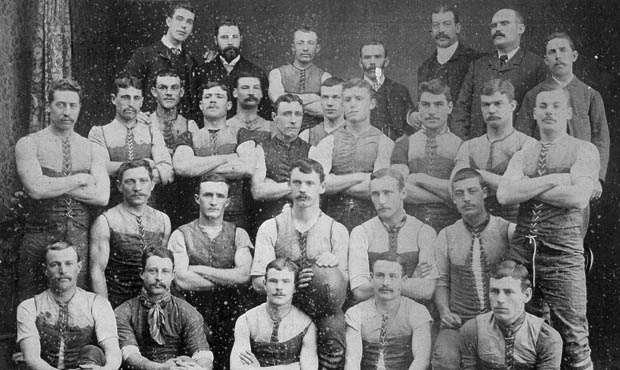
Carlton's 1887 VFA premiership side

=== Jack Worrall to World War I ===
Carlton's fortunes improved significantly in 1902. The Board elected the highly respected former Fitzroy footballer and Australian test cricketer Jack Worrall, then the secretary of the Carlton Cricket Club, to the same position at the football club. As secretary, Worrall slowly took over the managing of the players, in what is now recognised as the first official coaching role in the VFL. Under Worrall's guidance in the latter part of the 1902 season, Carlton's on-field performances improved, and in 1903 he led Carlton to the finals for the first time.

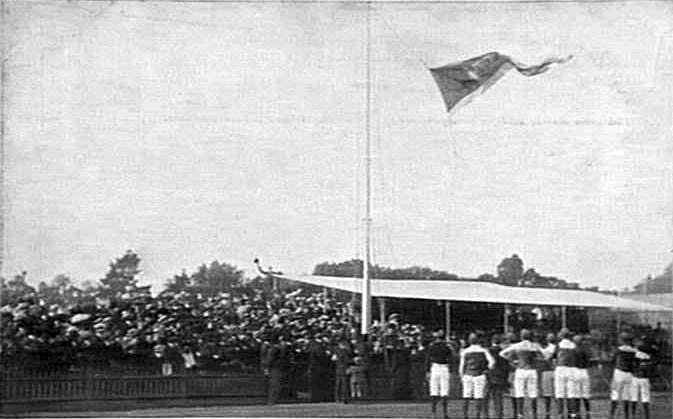
The 1906 VFL premiership flag being hoisted at Carlton Oval

Carlton built a strong reputation and financial position, and was able to convince many great players to shift to the club from other clubs, or even (in the case of Mick Grace) out of retirement. Worrall led the club to its first three VFL premierships, won consecutively, in 1906, 1907 and 1908. Carlton became the first club in the VFL to win three premierships in a row, and its win–loss record of 19–1 in the 1908 season (including finals) was a record which stood for more than ninety years.^{N 1}

Following these premierships, Carlton went through a tumultuous period off-field. Some players had become frustrated by low payments and hard training standards, and responded by refusing to train or even play matches. The club removed Worrall from the coaching role (he retained the role of secretary), and after significant changes at board level after the 1909 season, Worrall left the club altogether. Many players who had supported Worrall left the club at the end of the season. Then, in 1910, several players were suspected of having taken bribes to fix matches, with two players (Alex Lang and Doug Fraser) both found guilty and suspended for 99 matches. Despite this backdrop, Carlton continued its strong on-field form, reaching the 1909 and 1910 Grand Finals, but losing both.

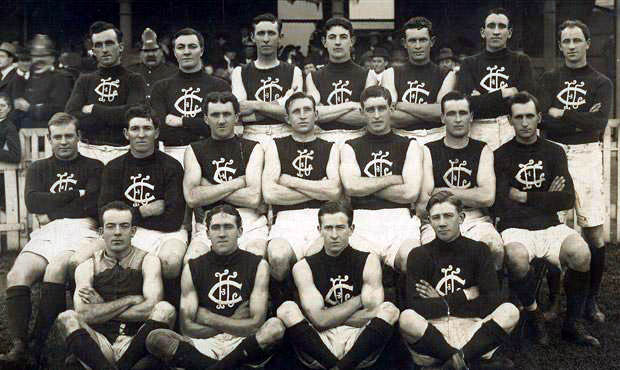
The 1914 Carlton team photographed at the old East Melbourne Cricket Ground.

Carlton fell out of the finals in 1913, but returned in 1914 under coach Norm Clark, and with many inexperienced players, to win back-to-back premierships in 1914 and 1915 VFL seasons. Most football around the country was suspended during the height of World War I, but Carlton continued to compete in a VFL which featured, at its fewest, only four clubs. Altogether, between Jack Worrall's first Grand Final in 1904 and the peak of World War I in 1916, Carlton won five premierships and contested nine Grand Finals for one of the most successful times in the club's history. The only success which eluded the club was the Championship of Australia; Carlton contested the championship three times (1907, 1908 and 1914), with its South Australian opponents victorious on all three occasions.

=== Between the wars ===
Through the 1920s and the Great Depression of the 1930s, Carlton maintained a strong on-field presence. The club was a frequent finalist, contesting fourteen finals series between the wars. However, premiership success did not follow, and the club contested only three Grand Finals for just one premiership during this period, and endured the second longest premiership drought (23 years) in the club's history. The drought was broken with the club's sixth VFL premiership in 1938, when former Subiaco and South Melbourne champion Brighton Diggins was recruited by the club to serve as captain-coach.

On-field, Carlton's inter-war period was highlighted by two of its greatest goalkickers: in the 1920s, Horrie Clover (396 goals in 147 games), and in the 1930s, Harry "Soapy" Vallence (722 goals in 204 games), both of which were Carlton career records at the time.

=== 1941–1964 ===
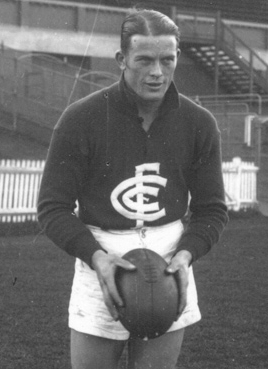
Bob Chitty captained Carlton to victory in the 1945 "Bloodbath" Grand Final.

The VFL continued to operate through World War II. With the retirement of Diggins, Carlton secured the services of former Richmond coach Percy Bentley, who coached the club for fifteen seasons. Carlton continued to finish in or near the finals without premiership success through the war, before winning the premiership in 1945, one month after peace. In a remarkable season, Carlton languished with a record of 3–6 after nine weeks, but won ten of the remaining eleven home-and-away matches to finish fourth; Carlton then comfortably beat North Melbourne in the first semi-final, overcame a 28-point deficit in the final quarter to beat Collingwood in the preliminary final, then beat South Melbourne in the notoriously brutal and violent Bloodbath Grand Final.

Carlton contested two more Grand Finals in the 1940s, both against Essendon, winning the 1947 Grand Final by a single point, and being comfortably beaten in 1949. Thereafter followed what was then Carlton's weakest on-field period since Worrall's appointment in 1902, with the club reaching the finals only four times between 1950 and 1964. Finishing tenth out of twelve and winning only five matches, 1964 was Carlton's worst VFL season to that point in its history.

=== Ron Barassi to 1973 ===
A change of president at the end of 1964 heralded the most successful period in the Carlton Football Club's history. Between 1967 and 1988, Carlton missed the finals only three times, contested ten Grand Finals, and won seven premierships.

The period of success began when George Harris replaced Lew Holmes as president of the club, after the 1964 season. Harris then signed Melbourne legend Ron Barassi serve as coach from 1965. Barassi was a six-time premiership player and two-time premiership captain at Melbourne during its most successful era, and at the age of 28 was still one of the biggest names in the game. His shift to Carlton remains one of the biggest player transfers in the game's history. Also contributing to Carlton's success was the strength of the Bendigo Football League, to which Carlton gained recruitment access through the VFL's country zoning arrangements.

Under Barassi, Carlton reached three consecutive Grand Finals between 1968 and 1970, resulting in two premierships: 1968 against Essendon and 1970 against traditional rivals Collingwood. The 1970 Grand Final remains one of the most famous matches in football history. Played in front of an enduring record crowd of 121,696, Collingwood dominated early to lead by 44 points at half time, but Carlton kicked seven goals in fifteen minutes after half time to narrow the margin to only three points; after a close final quarter, Carlton won its tenth VFL premiership with a ten-point victory. Carlton won its first and second Championship of Australia titles in 1968 and 1970, beating the SANFL's Sturt Football Club in both seasons.

Carlton missed the finals in 1971, and Barassi left the club at the end of the season, but Carlton returned to prominence the following year, and contested back-to-back Grand Finals. Both matches were against Richmond, with Carlton recording a high-scoring victory in 1972, and losing a rough, physical encounter in 1973.

Of the legendary players from the Barassi era, none was more important than John Nicholls, who captained all three premierships and took over as captain-coach upon Barassi's departure. Nicholls, a ruckman and forward, had played at Carlton since 1957, and he and Graham Farmer (who played with Geelong and in the WAFL during the same era) are regarded as the greatest ruckmen in the league's history. Midfielders Sergio Silvagni and Adrian Gallagher, half-forward Robert Walls, and ruckman Percy Jones were also prominent throughout the Barassi era, and in 1970, Alex Jesaulenko became the first (and to date, only) Carlton forward to kick 100 goals in a season.

=== 1975–1982 ===
Carlton continued to play finals through the 1970s without premiership success, and went through several coaches in a short period of time: Nicholls (until 1975), Ian Thorogood (1976–77), Ian Stewart (for only three matches in 1978), and Alex Jesaulenko as playing coach after Stewart's departure. It was not until 1979 that Carlton again reached the Grand Final, defeating Collingwood by five points in a close match best remembered for the late goal kicked by Ken Sheldon, after Wayne Harmes tapped the ball into the goalsquare from the boundary line.

After the 1979 season, there was off-field instability at the board level. Ian Rice replaced George Harris as president,^{N 2} and many of Harris' supporters left the club, including Jesaulenko, who went to St Kilda. Percy Jones replaced Jesaulenko as coach in 1980, before Hawthorn coach David Parkin was recruited in 1981, Carlton's sixth coach in eight seasons.

Despite the off-field troubles, Carlton continued to thrive on-field, and Parkin led the team to back-to-back premierships in 1981 and 1982, with victories in the Grand Finals against Collingwood and Richmond respectively. With its fourteenth premiership in 1982, Carlton overtook Collingwood to become the most successful club in the league's history, based on premierships won – a position it has held either outright or jointly with Essendon and Collingwood since.

Starring on-field during this period for Carlton was Bruce Doull, regarded as one of the best half-back flankers in the history of the league. Wayne Johnston was a prominent centreman/forward, and Carlton had great success recruiting high-profile Western Australian footballers to the club, including Mike Fitzpatrick, Ken Hunter and Peter Bosustow.

=== 1983–2001 ===
In 1983, John Elliott took over the presidency from Ian Rice. On-field, the club endured three consecutive unsuccessful finals campaigns under Parkin before he was replaced by Robert Walls in 1986. Also in 1986, Carlton lured three of South Australia's top young players to the club: Stephen Kernahan, Craig Bradley and Peter Motley. The club reached the next two Grand Finals, losing in 1986 and winning in 1987, both times against Hawthorn. Kernahan went on to become the club's longest serving captain and leading career goalkicker (738 goals), and Bradley became the club games record holder (375 games); Motley's career was unfortunately cut short by a non-fatal car accident in 1987. Carlton had also recruited Stephen Silvagni (son of Sergio) in 1985, who is now recognised as one of the greatest fullbacks of all time, and secured the league's star player Greg Williams in a trade in 1992.

David Parkin returned to coach the club from 1991 until 2000, and Carlton was a mainstay of the finals throughout most of this time. In 1995, Carlton became the first team to win twenty matches in a home-and-away season (finishing with a record of 20–2), and won the Grand Final against Geelong to claim its sixteenth premiership. Carlton reached two other Grand Finals during the 1990s, losing to Essendon in 1993 and to the Kangaroos in 1999; in 1999, Carlton had come from sixth on the home-and-away ladder to qualify for the Grand Final, famously beating its rival Essendon (the minor premiers) by one point in the preliminary final.

=== Period of struggle (2002–2021) ===
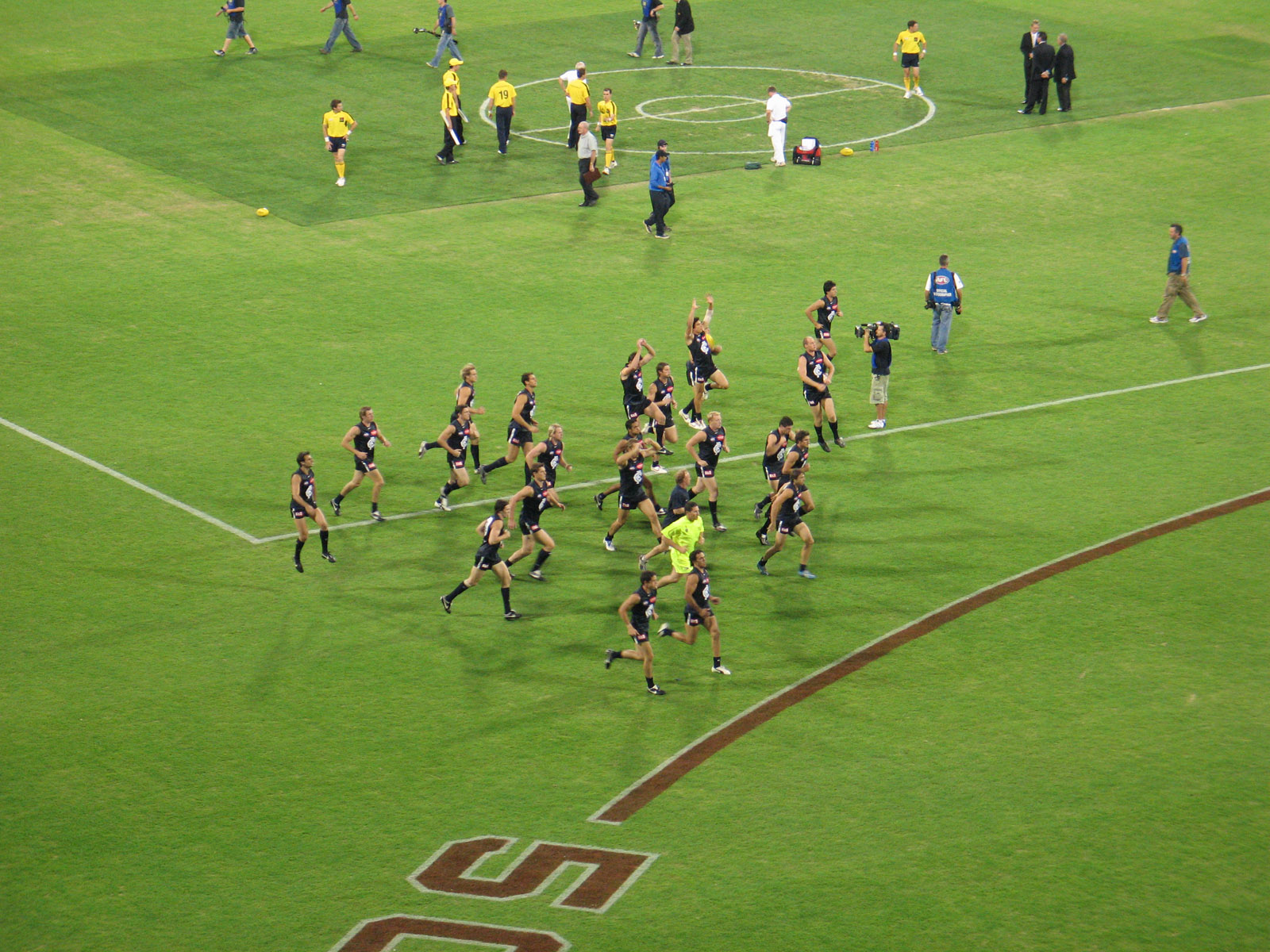
Carlton players during pre-game warmup

In 2002, Carlton swiftly fell from being one of the most successful clubs, both on-field and off-field, to one of the least successful. The club had been much slower than others to embrace the AFL draft as a means for recruitment, so when its champion players from the 1990s began to retire in the early 2000s, on-field performances fell away quickly, and in 2002, the club won the wooden spoon for the first time in its VFL/AFL history; it was the last of the twelve Victorian clubs to win the wooden spoon. At the same time, the club was starting to struggle financially, due to unwise investments under John Elliott – most significantly, building a new grandstand at Princes Park during the 1990s, at a time when other clubs were finding it more profitable to play at the higher-capacity central venues. Then, at the end of 2002, it was revealed that Carlton had been systematically cheating the league salary cap during the early 2000s. The scandal resulted in the loss of draft picks and a fine of $930,000, which exacerbated the club's poor on-field and off-field positions.

In the immediate fall-out from 2002, president John Elliott was voted out by the members, and was replaced with Docklands Stadium CEO Ian Collins. Under Collins, the club shifted its home stadium from Princes Park to Docklands, with the final match played at Princes Park in 2005. Additionally, coach Wayne Brittain was sacked, and replaced with Kangaroos coach Denis Pagan. On-field performances did not improve under Pagan, and overall the club won three wooden spoons and finished in the bottom two five times between 2002 and 2007.

Carlton's overall position began to improve in 2007, when businessman Richard Pratt, Steven Icke and Collingwood's Greg Swann came to the club as president, general manager of football operations, and CEO respectively; although Pratt's presidency lasted only sixteen months, after which he was replaced by Stephen Kernahan, the new personnel stabilised the club's off-field position. Pagan was sacked as coach mid-season after a string of heavy defeats, and was replaced by former club captain and assistant coach Brett Ratten. Then, prior to the 2008 season, Carlton was able to secure a trade for West Coast's Chris Judd, one of the league's best midfielders, to join the club as captain. The time spent at the bottom of the ladder also allowed Carlton to secure three No. 1 draft picks – Marc Murphy, Bryce Gibbs and Matthew Kreuzer – who helped the club's on-field position. Brett Ratten led Carlton to the finals from 2009 until 2011, but was sacked with a year remaining on his contract after the club missed the finals in 2012, and was replaced by former West Coast and Collingwood premiership coach Mick Malthouse. Under Malthouse, the club returned to the finals in 2013, but fell to thirteenth in 2014.

Kernahan stepped aside in mid-2014, and was replaced by Mark LoGiudice, who presided over a period of mediocre onfield results. The relationship between Malthouse and the club's quickly and publicly deteriorated; and in early 2015, after giving a radio interview critical of the board, Malthouse was sacked the club going on to finish last. Former Hawthorn assistant coach Brendon Bolton took over as coach from the 2016 season, leading only into his fourth season before he too was sacked after overseeing the team's decline to another wooden spoon in 2018 with a 2–20 record, the worst win–loss record in its VFL/AFL history, followed by an equally weak 1–10 start to the 2019 season. Bolton's replacement, David Teague, helped the club avoid the 2019 wooden spoon, but lasted only two years into a three-year contract without a finals appearance.

=== 2020s ===
LoGiudice handed over the presidency to Luke Sayers in August 2021, and Sayers conducted an extensive independent review of the football department during the second half of that season; Teague was sacked, and Michael Voss was appointed senior coach. Voss led the club for just over four seasons, and led the club to finals in his second and third seasons, ending what had become a club-record nine year VFL/AFL finals drought, with his best result a preliminary final defeat in 2023. However, there was a sharp downturn in performances starting in mid-2024, and in 2025 the club missed the finals; Sayers also stood down as president that season, replaced by Robert Priestly in early 2025.

Voss and the club parted ways two months into the 2026 season, after the continued downturn in performance under his coaching led to a 1–8 start to the season. Assistant Josh Fraser stepped in as interim coach, and oversaw a complete form reversal culminating in an unexpected finals appearance; Fraser was appointed senior coach shortly after clinching the finals berth.

During the 2020s, Carlton achieved two of its greatest individual successes, with captain Patrick Cripps becoming the club's first dual Brownlow Medallist and full forward Charlie Curnow becoming the club's first back-to-back Coleman Medallist.

== Club symbols ==
=== Guernsey ===
The current Carlton guernsey is navy blue, emblazoned with a white CFC monogram (which stands for "Carlton Football Club") on the front, and white numbers on the back. This guernsey design is specified in the club's constitution. Other than changes to the font of the monogram, this has been Carlton's guernsey continually since 1909. The club has worn navy blue in its uniform since 1871, when colour of the team's caps was changed from orange/yellow. The club's on-and-off field apparel was manufactured by Nike from 1998 until 2019, and by Puma from 2020 until at least 2029.

The team wears navy blue shorts in home games, and white shorts in away games. Since the introduction of clash guernseys in 2007, Carlton has had several clash designs which have been mostly white, with navy blue monogram, numbers, trimmings and minor panels in a variety of combinations. Designs in predominantly sky blue (2011–2012) and silver (2018) have also been used.

=== Nickname ===
Carlton's official nickname is the 'Blues'. Since the addition of navy blue to the playing uniform in 1871, the club has been known almost universally in print media as the Blues, Dark Blues or Navy Blues. Other colloquial nicknames include Bluebaggers or 'Baggers. Prior to 1871, when the uniform was predominantly chamois, the club was known informally as the Butchers.

For a time after World War II, the club briefly considered changing its nickname to the Cockatoos, but this never formally eventuated; even so, the association with the nickname was strong enough that newspaper cartoons depicting a Carlton cockatoo were common. The cockatoo connection derived from the talking cockatoo brought to home matches by club member Bob St. Marr for more than 30 years; intelligent enough to squawk its support for Carlton and loud enough to be heard over the crowd, 'Cocky Marr' had become an unofficial live mascot for the club until the bird's death in 1939.

=== Club song ===
Carlton's club song is "We Are the Navy Blues". The lyrics are believed to have been written in around 1930 by cousins Irene McEldrew and Agnes Wright, who ran a boarding house for several club players and the latter of whom was the niece of then-coach Dan Minogue. It is sung to the tune of Lily of Laguna.

=== Home grounds, headquarters, training and administrative base ===
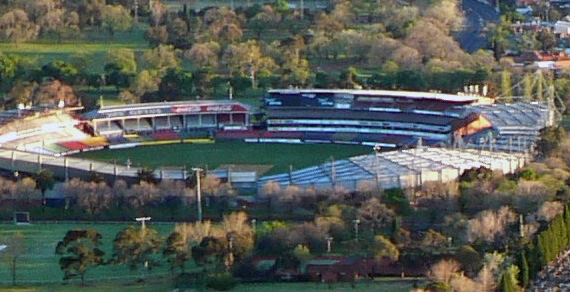
Princes Park

The club's traditional home ground is Princes Park (currently known as Ikon Park), located in North Carlton. After struggling to find a permanent home venue during its time in the VFA, Carlton established Princes Park as its home venue when it joined the VFL in 1897. The club played most of its home matches at Princes Park every year between 1897 and 2004 (except for 2002, when it played only four home games there), and a single farewell game was staged at the venue in 2005. It was the last of the suburban home grounds^{N 3} to be used in AFL competition. The venue remains Carlton's training and administrative base, and the club's current 40-year lease on the venue with the City of Melbourne runs until 2035.

Since 2005, Carlton has split its home games between Docklands Stadium and the Melbourne Cricket Ground, with six matches at the former and five at latter in most years. The matches expected to draw the highest crowds are usually scheduled for the Melbourne Cricket Ground.

== Rivalries ==
=== Collingwood ===
Carlton and Collingwood share a rivalry considered to be one of the most historic and significant in Australian sport, dating back to their spiteful 1910 Grand Final.

They have met six times in Grand Finals, with Carlton successful in all bar the first. Carlton home matches between the club contest the Richard Pratt Cup, and Collingwood home matches are designated as the Peter Mac Cup. They also share the same number of premierships, at 16.

=== Essendon ===
Carlton also has rivalry with Essendon. With 16 premierships apiece, the two teams, along with Collingwood, are the joint most successful teams in the VFL/AFL history. Grand finals between the two clubs were played in 1908, 1947, 1949, 1962, 1968 and 1993, each team winning three of the six.

=== Richmond ===
Carlton has a rivalry with Richmond, with this rivalry based on geographical proximity and large supporter bases. The two teams contested four grand finals between 1969 and 1982, each winning two; and since 2008 have met annually on a Thursday night in round 1 at the Melbourne Cricket Ground, usually as the opening game of the season.

== Club honours ==
Premierships
Competition	Level	Wins	Years won
Australian Football League	Seniors	16	1906, 1907, 1908, 1914, 1915, 1938, 1945, 1947, 1968, 1970, 1972, 1979, 1981, 1982, 1987, 1995
Australian Football League	Reserves (1919–1999)	8	1926, 1927, 1928, 1951, 1953, 1986, 1987, 1990
Australian Football League	Under 19s (1946–1991)	6	1948, 1949, 1951, 1963, 1978, 1979
Victorian Football Association	Seniors (1877–1896)	2	1877, 1887
Victorian Premiership	Seniors (1870–1876)	4	1871, 1873, 1874, 1875
Other titles and honours
AFL pre-season competition	Seniors	3	1997, 2005, 2007
McClelland Trophy	Seniors	5	1969, 1979, 1985 (tied), 1987, 1995
Championship of Australia	Seniors	2	1968, 1970
Challenge Cup	Seniors	1	1871
AFC Night Series	Seniors	1	1983
Finishing positions
Australian Football League	Minor premiership	17	1906, 1907, 1908, 1910, 1914, 1916, 1921, 1932, 1938, 1941, 1947, 1972, 1976, 1979, 1981, 1987, 1995
Australian Football League	Grand Finalist	13	1904, 1909, 1910, 1916, 1921, 1932, 1949, 1962, 1969, 1973, 1986, 1993, 1999
Australian Football League	Wooden spoons	5	2002, 2005, 2006, 2015, 2018
AFL Women's	Grand Finalist	1	2019
AFL Women's	Wooden spoons	1	2018

=== Carlton Team of the Century ===
Carlton's Team of the Century:
B:	Bruce Comben	Stephen Silvagni*	Geoff Southby
HB:	John James	Bert Deacon	Bruce Doull*
C:	Garry Crane	Greg Williams*	Craig Bradley
HF:	Wayne Johnston	Stephen Kernahan (Captain)	Alex Jesaulenko*
F:	Ken Hands	Harry Vallence	Rod Ashman
Foll:	John Nicholls*	Sergio Silvagni	Adrian Gallagher
Int:	Robert Walls	Mike Fitzpatrick	Ken Hunter
Int:	Trevor Keogh		
Coach:	David Parkin.		

Four emergencies were also named: (1) Laurie Kerr, (2) Bob Chitty, (3) Horrie Clover and (4) Rod McGregor. The five players with an asterisk(*) are also members of the AFL Team of the Century – the largest number of any AFL club.

== Hall of Fame ==
The Carlton Football Club established its Hall of Fame in 1987, with nine inaugural inductees. Each year between 1988 and 2001 an additional three to five people were inducted into the Carlton Hall of Fame. After a five-year break, an additional ten people were inducted into the Hall of Fame in 2006. As of May 2016, there have been 77 inductees.

A year after the AFL added a Legends category to the Australian Football Hall of Fame, Carlton added a Legends category to its hall of fame in 1997. As of 2023, there are 16 Legends in the Hall of Fame: Craig Bradley, Bert Deacon, Bruce Doull, Alex Jesaulenko, Wayne Johnston, Stephen Kernahan, John Nicholls, Stephen Silvagni and Harry Vallence (all elevated in 1997); Ken Hands (2006); Robert Walls (2011); Geoff Southby (2013); Sergio Silvagni (2016); David McKay (2021); and Horrie Clover and Ian Collins (2023).

== Individual awards ==
=== John Nicholls Medallists ===
Known as "Robert Reynolds Trophy" until 2003

No.	Player	Years won
5	John Nicholls	1959, 1963, 1965, 1966, 1967
5	Patrick Cripps	2015, 2018, 2019, 2022, 2024
4	Bruce Doull	1974, 1977, 1980, 1984
3	Craig Bradley	1986, 1988, 1993
3	John James	1955, 1960, 1961
3	Chris Judd	2008, 2009, 2010
3	Stephen Kernahan	1987, 1989, 1992
3	Brett Ratten	1995, 1997, 2000

=== Brownlow Medallists ===
Player	Year won
Bert Deacon	1947
John James	1961
Gordon Collis	1964
Greg Williams	1994
Chris Judd	2010
Patrick Cripps	2022, 2024

=== League leading goalkickers ===
VFL/AFL except where noted. Awarded the Coleman Medal since 1955.

Player	Year won
George Coulthard	1878, 1879, 1880 (VFA)
E. Brooks	1881 (VFA)
Mick Grace	1906
Ern Cowley	1918
Horrie Clover	1922
Harry Vallence	1931
Tom Carroll	1961
Brendan Fevola	2006, 2009
Harry McKay	2021
Charlie Curnow	2022, 2023

=== Norm Smith Medallists ===
Player	Year won
Wayne Harmes	1979
Bruce Doull	1981
David Rhys-Jones	1987
Greg Williams	1995

=== Mark of the Year winners ===
Player	Year won
Alex Jesaulenko	1970
Peter Bosustow	1981
Ken Hunter	1983
Stephen Silvagni	1988
Matthew Lappin	1999
Sam Walsh	2020

=== Goal of the Year winners ===
Player	Year won
Peter Bosustow	1981
Eddie Betts	2006
Chris Yarran	2012

=== Leigh Matthews Trophy winners ===
Player	Year won
Greg Williams	1994
Anthony Koutoufides	2000
Chris Judd	2011
Patrick Cripps	2019

=== Australian Football Hall of Fame inductees ===
Twenty-five people have been inducted into the Australian Football Hall of Fame for their services to football for careers which were either partially or entirely served with the Carlton Football Club. Of those, three have Legend status in the Hall of Fame.

Legends

Ron Barassi, Alex Jesaulenko, John Nicholls

Players

Peter Bedford, Craig Bradley, Horrie Clover, George Coulthard, Bruce Doull, Ken Hands, Ern Henfry, Ken Hunter, Wayne Johnston, Chris Judd, Stephen Kernahan, Anthony Koutoufides, Rod McGregor, Peter McKenna, Stephen Silvagni, Geoff Southby, Harry Vallence, Robert Walls, Greg Williams.

Coaches

Mick Malthouse, David Parkin, Jack Worrall

Administrators

Mike Fitzpatrick, Sir Kenneth Luke

== Current playing squad ==
Carlton Football Club · AFL personnel
Playing list		Inactive list	Coaching staff
2 Lachlan Cowan; 3 Jesse Motlop; 4 Oliver Hollands; 5 Adam Cerra; 7 Jagga Smith; 9 Patrick Cripps (c); 10 Harry McKay; 11 Mitch McGovern; 12 Ben Ainsworth; 13 Blake Acres; 14 Ollie Florent; 15 Billy Wilson; 17 Brodie Kemp; 18 Sam Walsh (vc); 19 Will Hayward; 22 Harry O'Farrell; 23 Jacob Weitering (vc)	24 Nic Newman; 25 Liam Reidy; 26 Nick Haynes; 27 Marc Pittonet; 29 George Hewett; 30 Jack Ison; 31 Campbell Chesser; 32 Matt Carroll (A); 34 Rob Monahan; 35 Harry Dean; 36 Cooper Lord; 39 Talor Byrne; 43 Ashton Moir; 44 Francis Evans (A); 46 Matt Cottrell; 47 Wade Derksen (A); Joel Amartey; Lachie Whitfield; Wil Parker		Senior coach: Josh Fraser; Assistant coaches: Ashley Hansen (back line); Leigh Adams (midfield); Tim Clarke (stoppages/structure); Matthew Kreuzer (ruck); Damian Truslove (development); Ash Close (development); Jacob Townsend (development); Legend: (c) captain; (vc) vice-captain; (A) Category A rookie; Updated: 13 November 2026; Sources: Players (rookies); coaches

== Corporate and administration ==
Since 1978 the club has operated as the incorporated company Carlton Football Club Limited.

=== Board of directors ===
President – Robert Priestley

Board members – David Campbell, Patty Kinnersly, Andrew McKay, Lahra Carey, Helen Kurincic, Michael Burn and Christopher Townshend.

=== Chief Executive Officers ===
CEOs since 1980.

Incumbent	Term
Jim Allison	1980–1981
Ian Collins	1981–1993
Stephen Gough	1994–1999
John Gurrieri	2000
Don Hanly	2001–2002
Michael Malouf	2003–2007
Greg Swann	2007–2014
Steven Trigg	2014–2017
Cain Liddle	2017–2021
Brian Cook	2021–2025
Graham Wright	2025–

=== Sponsorship ===
==== AFL ====
Year	Kit Manufacturer	Major Sponsor	Shorts Sponsor	Bottom Back Sponsor	Top Back Sponsor
1977–88	-	Avco	-	-	-
1989–93	-	Carlton & United Breweries	-	-	-
1994	-	Carlton & United Breweries	Bertolli	-	-
1995	-	Hyundai	Brashs	Hyundai	-
1996	-	Hyundai	Delta Car Rental	Hyundai	-
1997	-	Hyundai	Hyundai	Hyundai	-
1998–2000	Nike	Hyundai	Hyundai	Hyundai	-
2001–03	Nike	Mayne	Mayne	Mayne	-
2004	Nike	Toshiba Home Theatre	Mediplan	Toshiba Home Theatre	-
2005–07	Nike	Dan Murphy's (Home) Optus (Away)	K&S Freighters	Optus (Home) Dan Murphy's (Away)	-
2008	Nike	Hyundai (Home) Optus (Away)	Visy	Optus (Home) Hyundai (Away)	-
2009	Nike	Hyundai (Home) Malaysia Truly Asia (Away)	Optus	Malaysia Truly Asia (Home) Hyundai (Away)	-
2010–13	Nike	Hyundai (Home) Mars (Away)	Optus	Mars (Home) Hyundai (Away)	-
2014–15	Nike	Hyundai (Home) Mars (Away)	Acquire Learning	Mars (Home) Hyundai (Away)	-
2016	Nike	Hyundai (Home) CareerOne (Away)	Acquire Learning	CareerOne (Home) Hyundai (Away)	-
2017	Nike	Hyundai (Home) Virgin Australia (Away)	CareerOne	Virgin Australia (Home) Hyundai (Away)	-
2018–19	Nike	Hyundai (Home) Virgin Australia (Away)	La Trobe University	Virgin Australia (Home) Hyundai (Away)	-
2020	Puma	Hyundai (Home) Virgin Australia (Away)	La Trobe University	Virgin Australia (Home) Hyundai (Away)	-
2021-22	Puma	Hyundai (Home) Great Southern Bank (Away)	La Trobe University	Great Southern Bank (Home) Hyundai (Away)	TripADeal
2023	Puma	Hyundai (Home) Great Southern Bank (Away)	Bupa	Great Southern Bank (Home) Hyundai (Away)	TripADeal
2024-	Puma	Hyundai (Home) Great Southern Bank (Away)	Bupa	Great Southern Bank (Home) Hyundai (Away)	Ampol

==== AFL Women's ====
Year	Kit Manufacturer	Major Sponsor	Shorts Sponsor	Bottom Back Sponsor	Top Back Sponsor
2017-18	Cotton On	Hyundai	ZTE	MC Labour	-
2019-20	Cotton On	Hyundai	Bioglan	MC Labour	-
2021	Cotton On	Hyundai	Bioglan	Wheezo	Big Ant Studios
2022 S6	Cotton On	Hyundai	That's Amore Cheese	Endeavour Petroleum	Big Ant Studios
2022 S7	Cotton On	Hyundai	That's Amore Cheese	Great Southern Bank	Big Ant Studios
2023-	Cotton On	Hyundai	Bupa	Great Southern Bank	Big Ant Studios

=== Individual records ===
==== Most career goals ====
Player	Career Years	Goals
Stephen Kernahan	1986–1997	738
Harry "Soapy" Vallence	1926–1938	722
Brendan Fevola	1999–2009	575
Alex Jesaulenko	1967–1979	424
Horrie Clover	1920–1924, 1926–1931	398

==== Most career games ====
Player	Career Years	Games
Craig Bradley	1986–2002	375
Bruce Doull	1969–1986	356
Kade Simpson	2003– 2020	342
John Nicholls	1957–1974	328
Stephen Silvagni	1985–2001	312

=== VFL/AFL match records ===
- Most goals in a game: 13 by Horrie Clover vs. St Kilda in 1921
- Highest score: 30.30 (210) vs. Hawthorn on 12 April 1969
- Lowest score: 0.6 (6) vs. Collingwood on 4 June 1898
- Greatest winning margin: 140 points vs. St Kilda on 8 April 1985
- Greatest losing margin: 138 points vs. Hawthorn on 24 July 2015
- Highest losing score: 22.13 (145) v North Melbourne on 15 April 1985
- Lowest winning score: 3.6 (24) v South Melbourne on 24 June 1899
- Record attendance (home and away game): 91,571, 21 July 2000 at MCG v Essendon
- Record attendance (finals match): 121,696, Grand Final, 26 September 1970 v Collingwood.

== Reserves team ==
Carlton's seconds/reserves team was established in 1919; it operated semi-independently of the senior club until 1936, when the senior club's committee fully took over its operations. From 1919 to 1991 the VFL/AFL operated a reserves competition, and from 1992 to 1999 a de facto AFL reserves competition was run by the Victorian State Football League. The Carlton Football Club fielded a reserves team in both of these competitions, allowing players who were not selected for the senior team to play for Carlton in the lower grade. During that time, the Carlton reserves team won eight premierships (1926, 1927, 1928, 1951, 1953, 1986, 1987, 1990). Following the demise of the AFL reserves competition, the Carlton reserves team competed in the new Victorian Football League for three seasons from 2000 until 2002.

The reserves team was dissolved at the end of 2002, and Carlton entered a reserves affiliation with existing VFL club, the Northern Bullants. Under the affiliation, reserves players for Carlton played VFL football with the Northern Bullants. The partnership between the two clubs was strengthened in 2012, when the Northern Bullants were renamed the Northern Blues and they adopted Carlton's navy blue colours, and the club split its home games between the VFL club's traditional home, the Preston City Oval; and Carlton's traditional home, Ikon Park.

Carlton terminated the affiliation with the Northern Blues in early 2020, as a cost saving measure during the COVID-19 pandemic, and re-established a dedicated reserves team in the VFL for the 2021 season.

=== Development systems ===
Under the AFL's 2016 plan to establish club-branded Next Generation Academies across Australia to give all AFL clubs a more active role in junior development, Carlton was allocated the northern metropolitan zone of Melbourne. The academy is linked to the Preston-based Northern Knights in the statewide under-18s system.

Since 2019, the club has operated the Carlton College of Sports, a higher education institution in partnership with La Trobe University, which offers sports education diplomas and is operated out of the redeveloped grandstands at Ikon Park.

== Women's teams ==
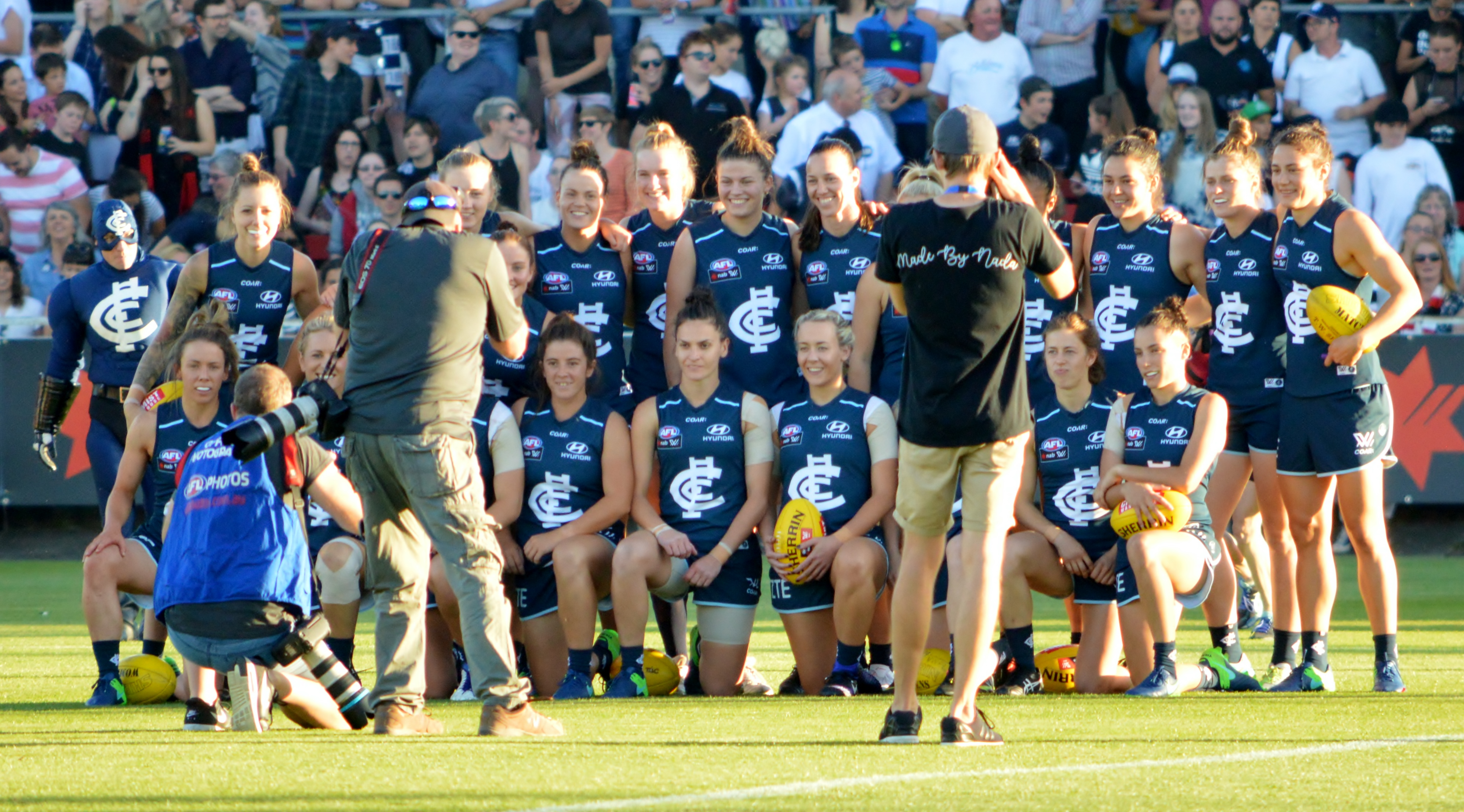
The Carlton team is photographed ahead of the first AFL Women's match in February 2017

The Carlton Football Club operates two senior women's teams: one team in the national AFL Women's competition, which it has fielded since the 2017 AFLW season; and one team in the state VFL Women's competition, which has been fielded since the 2018 VFLW season.

=== History ===
Carlton was a key cog in the establishment of Women's football in the state of Victoria. In August 1933 the club hosted the first ever VFL sanctioned match between women's teams, with sides representing Carlton and Richmond. Though Richmond's side was not associated directly with the VFL club of the same name, the Carlton side was picked and trained by the club with VFL players Mickey Crisp and Ray Brew as coaches. The match, played at Carlton's home Princes Park drew an estimated crowd of 10,000 and raised funds as part of a VFL bye-week carnival for The Royal Melbourne Hospital.

The club next fielded a women's team more than a decade later when it competed in a 1947 charity exhibition series raising funds in support of food shortages in post-war Commonwealth countries. The club's team played multiple matches in multiple series that season including a match against Footscray in July and a subsequent series against Hawthorn, South Melbourne, St Kilda and Footscray in August 1947.

=== AFL Women's team ===
In June 2016, Carlton was granted a licence to establish and field a team in the eight team AFL Women's league, which was set to stage its inaugural season in February–March 2017. The team is run and fully integrated within the Carlton Football Club, with football operation initially overseen by existing Head of Football Andrew McKay. Damien Keeping served as the team's inaugural head coach, and the club's existing Female Football Ambassador, Lauren Arnell, served as the inaugural captain; she, along with Marquee players and Darcy Vescio and Brianna Davey were the club's inaugural marquee signings.

In 2018, the Western Bulldogs and Carlton women's teams held the first Pride game in the AFLW, to celebrate gender diversity, promote inclusion for LGBTIQA+ players, and to help stamp out homophobia. After being joined by other clubs, in 2020, the first full AFLW Pride Round was held in 2021, supported by all 18 clubs in the league.

In its history, the team has played in one grand final, which it lost against Adelaide in 2019.

Current squad

Carlton Football Club · AFL Women's personnel
Playing list		Inactive list	Coaching staff
1 Amelia Velardo; 2 Lauren Bella; 3 Darcy Vescio; 4 Claudia Whitfort; 5 Abbie McKay (c); 6 Gab Pound; 7 Poppy Scholz; 8 Lily Baxter; 10 Mimi Hill (vc); 11 Yasmin Duursma; 12 Jessica Good; 13 Aisling Reidy*; 14 Siofra O'Connell*; 15 Meg Robertson; 17 Dayna Finn	18 Maddy Guerin; 19 Erone Fitzpatrick; 20 Lily Goss; 21 Harriet Cordner; 22 Brooke Boileau; 23 Lila Keck; 24 Brooke Vickers; 25 Keeley Sherar; 26 Tayla McMillan; 30 Kiara Bischa; 33 Lou-Lou Field; 36 Ciara Fitzgerald; 42 Tara Bohanna; 49 Madeline Hendrie; 55 Sophie McKay	16 Breann Harrington	Senior coach: Mathew Buck; Assistant coaches: Lloyd Perris (back line); Aasta O'Connor (midfield); Jess Dal Pos (forward line); Will Sexton (development); Legend: (c) captain; (vc) vice-captain; * rookie; Updated: 13 November 2026; Sources: Players, coaches

=== VFL Women's team ===
Prior the 2018 season, Carlton was granted a licence to field a team in the VFL Women's competition. The VFLW team originally operated under a separate program to the club's AFLW team, however in 2021 the VFLW was formally aligned with the AFLW competition, similar to the men's AFL/VFL system.

== See also ==
- Category:Carlton Football Club players
- List of Carlton Football Club coaches

== Footnotes ==
1. Specifically, Carlton's 19–1 record set a record for the best win–loss percentage across a full season, including finals, which stood until Essendon broke it in the 2000 AFL season with a record of 24–1. The record was matched twice before it was broken: by Collingwood in 1929, and Essendon in 1950.
2. Harris had served two tenures as Carlton president: from 1965–1974, then from 1978–1979.
3. The "suburban grounds" is a collective term generally understood to mean all venues in Melbourne, except for the Melbourne Cricket Ground, Docklands Stadium and Waverley Park.
