= South Yarra Football Club (1858–1873) =

Names

Club details
- Founded: 1858–59
- Dissolved: 1873
- Colours: Blue
- Competition: Unaffiliated
- Premierships: Challenge Cup (1865–66)
- Ground: Fawkner Park

The South Yarra Football Club was a 19th-century football club based in the Melbourne suburb of South Yarra which was seminal in the formative years of the sport of Australian rules football.

Throughout the first decade of football in Melbourne, South Yarra was one of the pre-eminent clubs in the colony in prestige and performance. In 1865 and 1866, the club won the Athletic Sports Committee Challenge Cup.

Its demise played a role in the formation of the modern day St Kilda Football Club, formed in 1873.

== History ==
The formal date of the South Yarra Football Club's establishment is unknown, with contemporary reports placing it somewhere between September 1858 (when a match was played between "thirty gentlemen resident at South Yarra, and an equal number, chiefly members of the Melbourne Cricket Club"), and April 1859, when the Argus newspaper spoke of the formation of suburban clubs and mentioned the club by name, making it one of the first football clubs in Melbourne. The club did not initially play under the Melbourne Football Club rules which became the basis of Australian rules football, and was possibly at this time a Rugby football club. Its members, consistent with South Yarra's demographics, were chiefly upper class and white collar workers, with many of their members having played school football in the English public school system.

The club played its first match against Melbourne under Melbourne rules – with one compromise that a mark could not be claimed from the kick of an opponent – on 9 and 23 July 1859, losing 3–0. Over the following years, the club was involved in conferences which further developed the Melbourne rules as they became widely used across the city; it was the first known club believed to have played with the rule now known as push in the back, advocating strongly for its inclusion in the laws of the game.

Throughout the first decade of football in Melbourne, South Yarra was one of the pre-eminent clubs in the colony in prestige and performance. In 1865 and 1866, the club won the Athletic Sports Committee Challenge Cup, a perpetual trophy which was contested among the principal clubs and won outright by the first club to win three consecutive cup matches without defeat. In 1865, the club fell one win short of claiming the cup after losing the final match of the year against Melbourne, but in 1866, they won the opening match of the year and were unbeaten thereafter, claiming permanent ownership after five draws and two more wins.

=== Decline and demise ===
Club captain and committee member George O'Mullane, one of the best footballers of the era, died aged 24 following the 1866 season.

South Yarra's off-field organisation declined after 1866: as football began to transition from a club-based pastime to a more regular system of competition, the club lost many of its best players and its performances declined. The club also became known for commitment issues, frequently turning up late to interclub matches. Despite these issues, the club continued to be considered one of the principal senior clubs, and was prominent in off-field organisation, including presenting its own Challenge Cup for competition in 1870.

However, by 1870, the club's onfield standard was well short of the other senior clubs, and they failed to defeat a senior opponent after 1868. In 1871, the sportswriter of the Australasian said of the club that "they have as good material players as any other club, but ... it is at once apparent they have never practiced together", as well as noting that the club lacked leadership and organisation.

During 1872, the club split into two groups of members who trained separately, one based at St Kilda and one based at South Yarra, which heralded the ultimate demise of the club.

Prior to the start of the 1873 season, the St Kilda-based members broke away to form a new club, the St Kilda Football Club, which survives today, while almost all of the prominent South Yarra-based members left for the University Football Club.

While the fragmented and weakened South Yarra arranged matches against the principal clubs for 1873, these were not played as the club folded in June of that year: its last competitive match was a 2–0 loss against the junior Williamstown Football Club on 31 May.
