= Deaths in April 1989 =

The following is a list of notable deaths in April 1989.

Entries for each day are listed alphabetically by surname. A typical entry lists information in the following sequence:

- Name, age, country of citizenship at birth, subsequent country of citizenship (if applicable), reason for notability, cause of death (if known), and reference.

== April 1989 ==
=== 1 ===
- Roy Francis, 70, Welsh rugby league footballer and coach (Hull FC, Barrow, Wales).
- Nedda Harrigan, 89, American actress, cancer.
- Paul Jappe, 91, American NFL player (New York Giants).
- Shreedhar Mahadev Joshi, 85, Indian politician and independence activist, Member of Parliament.
- Erich Lüth, 87, German writer and film director.
- Jan A. Rajchman, 77, Polish-American electrical engineer (Magnetic-core memory).
- George Robledo, 62, Chilean international footballer (Newcastle United, Chile), heart attack.

=== 2 ===
- E. Chambré Hardman, 89, Anglo-Irish photographer.
- Bill Munn, 77, Australian rules footballer.
- Daniel Spry, 86, Canadian Army general during World War II.
- Zainon Munshi Sulaiman, 86, Malaysian politician, member of the Malaysian Parliament.
- Norman Zinberg, 76–76, American psychoanalyst and psychiatrist who studied addiction.

=== 3 ===
- Mustafa Çağatay, 51, Turkish-Cypriot politician, Prime Minister of Turkish Cyprus, traffic accident.
- Les Jones, 78, Australian rules footballer.
- Friedrich-Jobst Volckamer von Kirchensittenbach, 94, Nazi German army general.
- Max Kroger, 90, Australian rules footballer.
- Edward Martell, 80, British politician, member of the London County Council.
- Lev Nikitin, 63, Soviet Olympic sprint canoeist (1952).
- Pinchas Hacohen Peli, 58, Israeli Orthodox rabbi, poet and scholar of Jewish philosophy.
- Vishnu Sahay, 87, Indian politician, Governor of Assam.
- Lester Warden, 48, Australian cricketer.
- Norman Wooland, 79, English actor (Hamlet).

=== 4 ===
- Gerard Casey, appr. 29, member of the Provisional Irish Republican Army, shot.
- Woody Crumbo, 77, American artist, flute player and dancer.
- John Gretton, 48, English peer, owner of Stapleford Park.
- Madeline Hurlock, 91, American silent-screen actress.
- Harvey Jablonsky, 80, American general in the U.S. Army, vice president of the Northrop Corporation, congestive heart failure.
- Martti Luomanen, 82, Finnish Olympic middle-distance runner (1932).
- Roberto Nicolosi, 74, Italian jazz double-bassist.
- Pete Richards, 83, American NFL player (Frankford Yellow Jackets).
- Baruch Harold Wood, 79, English chess player, founded the magazine CHESS.

=== 5 ===
- Geoffrey Binnie, 80, British civil engineer and writer (Jubilee Dam, Eye Brook Reservoir).
- Frank Foss, 93, American pole vaulter and Olympic gold medalist (1920).
- María Cristina Gómez, 46, El Salvadoran murder victim.
- Bill Gunn, 54, American playwright, actor and director (Ganja and Hess), encephalitis.
- Harold Hayes, 62, American journalist and writer (Esquire magazine).
- Marjorie Hoshelle, 71, American actress.
- Kurt Lischka, 79, Nazi German SS official, Gestapo chief and commandant of the Security police.
- Bill Mehlhorn, 90, American professional golfer.
- Karel Zeman, 78, Czech film director and animator (Cesta do pravěku, Na kometě).

=== 6 ===
- Zofia Batycka, 81, Polish model and actress.
- Elizabeth Becker-Pinkston, 86, American Olympic diver (1924, 1928).
- Tufton Beamish, 72, British Army officer and politician, Member of Parliament.
- Torsten Billman, 79, Swedish artist.
- Sylvia Cassedy, 59, American novelist and poet (Behind the Attic Wall).
- Bruce Cunliffe, 63, American Olympic ice hockey player (1948).
- Marion Holland, 80, American children's book writer and illustrator, cancer.
- Edelf Hosmann, 87, Argentine Olympic sailor (1936).
- Tapani Niku, 94, Finnish Olympic cross-country skier (1924).
- Pannalal Patel, 76, Indian author (Malela Jeev, Manvini Bhavai), brain haemorrhage.
- Michael Reusch, 75, Swiss Olympic gymnast (1936, 1948).
- John Paul Riddle, 87, American pilot, co-founded Embry-Riddle Aeronautical University.
- David Wilson, 74, New Zealand cricketer.

=== 7 ===
- Hassan al-Amri, 68–69, Yemeni lieutenant general and Prime Minister of the Yemen Arab Republic.
- Amena Begum, 63–64, Bangladeshi politician, Member of Parliament.
- Efraín Morote Best, 67, Peruvian lawyer, chief administrator of San Cristóbal of Huamanga University.
- Jim Jones, 68, American NFL player (Detroit Lions).
- Clyde Moody, 73, American Bluegrass musician.
- Evelyn Finley, 73, American B-movie actress and stuntwoman (Ghost Guns), heart failure.
- Cheng Nan-jung, 41, Taiwanese publisher and pro-democracy activist, suicide by immolation.
- André Reybaz, 59, French actor.
- Jack Ruby, 45–46, Jamaican record producer.
- Basawon Singh, 80, Indian independence activist, co-founder of the Congress Socialist Party.
- Elizabeth Sudmeier, 76, American spy, founding member of the Central Intelligence Agency.
- Garland Williams, 67, American football player (Brooklyn Dodgers).

=== 8 ===
- Albert Bormann, 86, German Nazi Gruppenführer, adjutant to Adolf Hitler, brother of Martin Bormann.
- Andy Karl, 75, American MLB player (Boston Red Sox, Philadelphia Phillies, Boston Braves).
- Lloyd Francis MacMahon, 76, American judge of the U.S. District Court, cerebral hemorrhage.
- A. M. Rajah, 59, Indian playback singer and music director, train accident.
- John Wyer, 79, English car racing engineer and team manager.

=== 9 ===
- Francesco De Zanna, 84, Italian Olympic bobsledder (1936).
- Birger Holmqvist, 88, Swedish Olympic ice hockey player (1924, 1928).
- Otto Huber, 75, American MLB player (Boston Bees).
- Friedrich Ritter, 90, German botanist (cacti).
- Albert Vigoleis Thelen, 85, German author and translator.
- Carl Wessler, 75, American animator and comic book writer.

=== 10 ===
- Joan Barry, 85, British actress (Rome Express).
- George Genereux, 54, Canadian trap shooter and Olympic gold medalist (1952).
- Bessie Griffin, 66, American gospel singer, breast cancer.
- Nikolai Grinko, 68, Ukrainian actor (Ivan's Childhood, Stalker).
- Gaston Van Haezebrouck, 84, Belgian Olympic speed skater (1924).
- Jacob Horton, American businessman, vice-president of Gulf Power, plane crash.
- Takehiro Irokawa, 60, Japanese writer, heart attack.
- Sandy Sandberg, 78, American NFL footballer (Pittsburgh Pirates).

=== 11 ===
- Noel Carrington, 93–94, English author and publisher, founder of Puffin Books.
- Emil Grosswald, 76, Romanian-American mathematician (number theory).
- Hiram Sherman, 81, American actor (Two's Company; How Now, Dow Jones), stroke.
- Sarban, 78, British writer and diplomat, British Ambassador to Paraguay.

=== 12 ===
- Ekkirala Bharadwaja, 50, Indian spiritual advisor.
- Arnold Carter, 71, American MLB player (Cincinnati Reds).
- Gerald Flood, 61, British actor of stage and television (Crane), heart attack.
- Bill Harper, 92, Scottish footballer (Hibernian, Scotland).
- Abbie Hoffman, 52, American political and social activist, co-founded the Youth International Party, suicide by overdose.
- Willie McNaught, 66, Scottish international footballer (Raith Rovers, Scotland).
- Antonio Porta, 53, Italian author and poet.
- Sugar Ray Robinson, 67, American professional boxer, welterweight and middleweight world champion, heart disease.
- Georges Sébastian, 85, Hungarian-born French conductor.
- Vasile Teodosiu, 72, Romanian Olympic long-distance runner (1952).
- Tilda Thamar, 67, Argentinian actress, car accident.

=== 13 ===
- Paul II Cheikho, 82, Iraqi patriarch of the Chaldean Catholic Church.
- António Ferreira Gomes, 83, Portuguese Roman Catholic bishop.
- Erich Herrmann, 74, German Olympic handball player (1936).
- Terry Miller, 46, American businessman and politician, Lieutenant Governor of Alaska, bone cancer.
- Tor Nilsson, 70, Swedish Olympic Greco-Roman wrestler (1948).
- Bill Putnam, 69, American audio engineer, songwriter and producer.
- Gilbert Scodeller, 57, French cyclist.

=== 14 ===
- Werner von Clemm, 91, German-born American banker.
- Chiang Hsiao-wen, 53, eldest son of Chiang Ching-kuo, throat cancer.
- Laurence Meynell, 89, English author.
- Lance Pierre, 67, West Indian cricketer.
- Carr Smith, 88, American MLB player (Washington Senators).

=== 15 ===
- Ray Agee, 68, American blues and R&B singer and songwriter.
- William Attwood, 69, American diplomat, U.S. Ambassador to Guinea and Kenya, congestive heart failure.
- Edward M. Brecher, 77, American science writer and author (Licit and Illicit Drugs).
- Brady Cowell, 89, American college sports player and coach.
- David Cuthbertson, 88, Scottish physician and biochemist, director of the Rowett Research Institute.
- Federico Gay, 92, Italian Olympic cyclist (1920).
- Hu Yaobang, 73, General Secretary of the Chinese Communist Party, heart attack.
- Bernard-Marie Koltès, 41, French playwright and theatre director, AIDS.
- Freda Lingstrom, 95, British BBC Television producer (Flower Pot Men, Andy Pandy).
- Alita Román, 76, Argentine film actress (Mujeres que trabajan, Concierto de almas).
- Connie Simmons, 64, American NBA basketballer (New York Knicks).
- Frances Steloff, 101, American founder of the Gotham Book Mart.
- Charles Vanel, 96, French actor and director (The Wages of Fear, The Woman Who Dared).
- Philip de Zulueta, 64, British diplomat, Private Secretary for Foreign Affairs to the Prime Minister.

=== 16 ===
- T. Coleman Andrews Jr., 64, American politician, member of the Virginia House of Delegates, heart attack.
- Tawfiq Yusuf 'Awwad, 77, Lebanese writer (Tawahin Beirut) and diplomat, Lebanese ambassador to five countries, rocket attack.
- Hugh Barton, 78, British Hong Kong businessman, chairman and managing director of Jardine Matheson.
- Brynjólfur Bjarnason, 90, Icelandic politician, chairman of the Communist Party of Iceland.
- Jocko Conlan, 89, American baseball umpire (National League).
- John Dighton, 79, British playwright and screenwriter (The Happiest Days of Your Life, The Man in the White Suit, Roman Holiday).
- Harald Edelstam, 76, Swedish diplomat, Ambassador to Algeria, cancer.
- Kaoru Ishikawa, 73, Japanese engineer and professor (Ishikawa diagram).
- John Holmes Jenkins, 48–49, American historian and champion poker player, shot.
- Bob Jones, 59, American white supremacist political activist (Ku Klux Klan).
- Miles Lawrence, 48, English cricketer.
- Dominic Olejniczak, 80, American politician (mayor of Green Bay, Wisconsin) and football executive (Green Bay Packers), stroke.
- Saroj Pathak, 59, Indian novelist.
- Thierry Paulin, 25, French serial killer, AIDS.
- Sam Wheeler, 65, American Negro Leagues baseball player and Harlem Globetrotter.
- Hakkı Yeten, 78, Turkish footballer and club president (Beşiktaş, Turkey).

=== 17 ===
- Inji Aflatoun, 65, Egyptian painter and women's activist.
- Psyche Cattell, 95, American psychologist.
- Ken Gee, 72, English international rugby league footballer (Wigan, England).
- Ivica Jelić, 71, Yugoslavian Olympic gymnast (1948, 1952).
- Charles Lampkin, 76, American actor (Roots: The Next Generations) and musician.
- Cecil Leeson, 86, American saxophonist.
- Candan Tarhan, 46, Turkish football manager.
- Villano II, 39, Mexican Luchador enmascarado (masked professional wrestler), suicide.

=== 18 ===
- Adil Atan, 60, Turkish Olympic wrestler (1952, 1956).
- Hilde Benjamin, 87, East German judge and Minister of Justice.
- Ruth VanSickle Ford, 91, American painter, owner of the Chicago Academy of Fine Arts.
- William Hector Payne, 74, Canadian politician, member of the House of Commons of Canada (1958-1962).
- Julia Smith, 84, American composer and pianist.

=== 19 ===
- Ferdinand aus der Fünten, 79, Nazi German SS-Hauptsturmführer, head of the Amsterdam Central Office for Jewish Emigration.
- Harry Marker, 78, American NFL player (Pittsburgh Pirates).
- Dame Daphne du Maurier, 81, English novelist and playwright (Rebecca, The Birds, My Cousin Rachel), heart failure.
- George Paxton, 75, American saxophonist and big band leader (Coed Records), apparent suicide.
- Gale Staley, 89, American MLB player (Chicago Cubs).
- James Edgar Walker, 77, Canadian politician, member of the House of Commons of Canada (1962-1974).
- George Whitmore, 43, American playwright, novelist and poet, AIDS.

=== 20 ===
- Harold Barlow, 89, British engineer (Royal Medal).
- Doru Davidovici, 43, Romanian aviator and writer, training crash.
- Edward DeSaulnier, 68, American politician and judge, member of the Massachusetts House of Representatives, suicide.
- Kenneth Harrison, 50, American serial killer, suicide.
- Uichiro Hatta, 85, Japanese footballer.
- Bob McGann, 83, Australian rules footballer.
- Maurice Nyagumbo, 64, Zimbabwean politician, suicide.
- Martin Ragaway, 66, American comedy writer.
- Lou Riley, 79, Australian rules footballer.
- Lydia Sherwood, 82, British film and stage actress.

=== 21 ===
- Princess Deokhye of Korea, 76, last princess of the Korean royal family.
- Lou Gregory, 86, American Olympic long-distance runner (1932).
- James Kirkwood Jr., 64, American playwright, author and actor (A Chorus Line, P.S. Your Cat Is Dead), AIDS.
- Paul Mitchell, 53, Scottish-American co-founder of John Paul Mitchell Systems, pancreatic cancer.
- James N. Rowe, 51, American officer in the U.S. Army, assassinated.

=== 22 ===
- Jan Baars, 85, Dutch fascist.
- Paul Beard, 87, English violinist (London Philharmonic Orchestra, BBC Symphony Orchestra).
- Vi Farrell, 75, English-born New Zealand cricketer.
- Kenny McBain, 42, Scottish TV director and producer (Inspector Morse, Grange Hill).
- Siegfried Ruff, 82, Nazi German physician, acquitted of war crimes.
- Emilio Segrè, 84, Italian-American physicist, discovered technetium and astatine, Nobel laureate in Physics, heart attack.
- Dmitry Selivanov, 25, Soviet rock singer (Grazhdanskaya Oborona), suicide.
- Tommy Thompson, 72, American NFL and CFL footballer (Philadelphia Eagles), brain cancer.
- Ted Trim, 81, Australian rules footballer.
- Tony Tursi, 88, Italian-American mobster in Puerto Rico.

=== 23 ===
- K. Suryanarayana Adiga, 74, Indian lawyer and politician, member of Mysore Legislative Council, chairman of Karnataka Bank.
- Norm Baker, 66, Canadian professional basketball and lacrosse player.
- Marc Daniels, 77, American television director (I Love Lucy, Star Trek), congestive heart failure.
- Hamani Diori, 72, Nigerien politician, president of Republic of Niger.
- Hu Die, 81, Chinese actress (The Burning of the Red Lotus Temple), stroke.
- Imre Hódos, 61, Hungarian Olympic wrestler (1952, 1956, 1960).
- Whitfield Jack, 82, American military colonel and attorney.
- Stefan Korboński, 88, Polish-American politician, lawyer and journalist, aneurysm.
- Howie Krist, 73, American MLB player (St. Louis Cardinals).
- Cecil Lowell, 75, South African cricketer.
- Bojan Postružnik, 36, Yugoslavian Olympic archer (1976).
- Eduard Schöll, 84, Austrian Olympic wrestler (1936).
- Marcel Schumann, 88, Luxembourgian Olympic footballer (1924).
- Harry Bolton Seed, 66, British-American geotechnical earthquake engineer, cancer.
- Rupert Worker, 93, New Zealand cricketer.

=== 24 ===
- Franz Binder, 77, Austrian international footballer and coach (Rapid Wien, Austria).
- Roger Dewasch, 68, French Olympic water polo player (1948).
- Clyde Geronimi, 87, American animation director (Walt Disney Productions).
- Fred Godfrey, 78, Australian rules footballer.
- Roland Harper, 82, British Olympic hurdler (1932).
- Li Jingquan, 79, Chinese politician and governor of Sichuan.
- Henry G. Parks Jr., 72, American businessman, complications from Parkinson's disease.
- Lee Roberts, 75, American actor.
- Edgar Sanabria, 77, Venezuelan diplomat and politician, interim President of Venezuela, stroke.
- Santana, 53, Portuguese international footballer (Benfica, Portugal)).
- Johnny Stark, 66, French impresario, heart attack.
- Birger Stenman, 79, Finnish Olympic gymnast (1928).

=== 25 ===
- Dee Boeckmann, 82, American Olympic middle-distance runner (1928).
- Kenneth Cockrel Sr., 50, American politician, member of the Detroit Common Council, heart attack.
- George Coulouris, 85, English film and stage actor (Citizen Kane).
- Sam Fletcher, 55, American singer (I Believe in You).
- Yap Thiam Hien, 75, Indonesian human rights lawyer, internal bleeding.
- Norma Klein, 50, American young adults' book author.
- Alan Robertson, 69, English population geneticist.
- Caspar Schrøder, 83, Danish Olympic fencer (1936).
- John Barton Wolgamot, 86, American poet.

=== 26 ===
- Lucille Ball, 77, American actress and comedienne (I Love Lucy), ruptured abdominal aortic aneurysm.
- Robert Gysae, 78, Nazi German U-boat commander.
- Robert S. Kennemore, 68, American officer in the U.S. Marine Corps, Medal of Honor recipient.
- Carl Monroe, 29, American NFL footballer (San Francisco 49ers), accidental overdose.

=== 27 ===
- Alphonse Bouton, 81, French Olympic rower (1936).
- Howard Brookner, 34, American film director (Burroughs, Bloodhounds of Broadway), AIDS.
- Leopold Buczkowski, 83, Polish writer.
- Stephen Sanders Chandler Jr., 89, American district judge (United States District Court for the Western District of Oklahoma).
- Marcel J. E. Golay, 86, Swiss-born American mathematician and physicist (Golay Detector, Golay cell).
- Harold Gurden, 85, British politician, Member of Parliament.
- Carl Lundsteen, 76, Danish footballer.
- Konosuke Matsushita, 94, Japanese founder of Panasonic, pneumonia.
- Frank O'Rourke, 72, American writer (A Mule for the Marquesa), suicide.
- T. Amrutha Rao, 68, Indian politician, member of the Andhra Pradesh Legislative Assembly.
- Paavo Salminen, 77, Finnish Olympic footballer (1936).
- William Arthur Smith, 71, American artist.

=== 28 ===
- Stanley Roy Badmin, 83, English painter and etcher.
- Jack Cummings, 84, American film producer and director.
- Géza von Cziffra, 88, Hungarian and Austrian film director and screenwriter (Kiss Me Kate, Seven Brides for Seven Brothers).
- Pinchoo Kapoor, 61–62, Indian actor (Don, Roti, Avtaar).
- Esa Pakarinen, 78, Finnish actor, singer and comedian (Pekka and Pätkä), cancer.
- Raúl Sendic, 63, Uruguayan lawyer and trade unionist, founder of the Tupamaros National Liberation Movement, amyotrophic lateral sclerosis.
- Roy Lee Williams, 74, American labor leader, president of the Teamsters, cardiac disease and emphysema.

=== 29 ===
- Donald Deskey, 94, American industrial designer.
- Marlene Elejarde, 37, Cuban Olympic sprinter (1968, 1972).
- Ehsan Tabari, 72, Iranian philosopher and poet, kidney and heart failure.
- Vic Wilcox, 76, New Zealand farmer and trade unionist, secretary-general of the Communist Party of New Zealand, cancer.

=== 30 ===
- Yi Bangja, 87, wife of Crown Prince Euimin, last Crown Prince of the Korean Empire, cancer.
- Birge Clark, 96, American architect (Lou Henry Hoover House, Norris House).
- Nelson Dalzell, 68, New Zealand rugby union player (Canterbury, All Blacks).
- Edwin F. Kalmus, 95, Austrian-American music publisher.
- Gottfried Köthe, 83, Austrian mathematician (Köthe conjecture, topological vector spaces).
- Sergio Leone, 60, Italian film director and producer (Dollars Trilogy), heart attack.
- Pierre Lewden, 88, French Olympic high jumper (1920, 1924, 1928).
- Stumpy Thomason, 83, American NFL footballer (Brooklyn Dodgers).
- Taiji Tonoyama, 73, Japanese actor.
- Guy Williams, 65, American actor (Zorro, Lost in Space), brain aneurysm.

=== Unknown date ===
- Hassan Djamous, Chadian military commander, Commander-in-Chief of the Chadian National Army.
- Josef Papp, appr. 55, American engineer, likely hoaxer.
- Doug Smith, 71, English jockey and trainer, suicide.
- Harry White, 72–73, Irish republican paramilitary.
