= Champion of the Colony =

The Champion of the Colony Award is a list that was compiled in the 1940s and 1950s by Australian rules football historian Cecil Clarence Mullen (1895–1983) for Mullen's Australasian Footballers' Almanac in 1950, for Mullen's Footballers' Australian Almanac in 1951, and for the History of Australian Rules Football in 1958.

According to Mullen's 1950 almanac, the Champion of the Colony was an annual award was originally based on votes by club captains and later by Melbourne's leading football journalists, which was the accepted historical interpretation of the title for many decades.

More recent research has failed to uncover any contemporary evidence of any such award having ever existed, and it is now generally accepted that the list was compiled entirely by Mullen, based on newspaper reports that he had collected over many years.

== Four lists ==
The final year for each of the lists produced by Mullen varied throughout his works: the 1950 Almanac finishes in 1949, the 1951 Almanac finishes in 1950, and the 1958 history finishes in 1940. A fourth list that is claimed to be based on Mullen's work, finishing in 1945, has been used since 2003 in official Australian Football League (AFL) publications, with the 2017 and 2018 AFL Season Guide noting the newspapers that Mullen used in compiling his list.

The original list as compiled by Mullen contained multiple factual errors, while the 1945 version of the list contains anomalies compared to the lists of 1940, 1949 and 1950.

== List of C. C. Mullen's Champions of the Colony ==
Year	Player	Club
1856	Tom Wills ^{1}	Corio Bay
1857	Tom Wills	Corio Bay
1858	G. S. Bruce	Richmond Cricketers
1859	Tom Wills	Geelong
1860	H. W. Bryant	Melbourne
1861	George O'Mullane	South Yarra
1862	Henry C. Harrison	Melbourne
1863	Henry C. Harrison	Melbourne
1864	A. M. Greenfield	Ballarat
1865	Tom Wills	Melbourne
1866	Henry C. Harrison	Melbourne
1867	Henry C. Harrison	Melbourne
1868	Jack Conway	Carlton
1869	Henry C. Harrison	Melbourne
1870	T. W. C. Riddell	South Yarra
1871	B. J. Goldsmith	Melbourne
1872	Tom Wills	Geelong
1873	J. C. Donovan	Carlton
1874	W. N. Lacey	Carlton
1875	George Robertson	Carlton
1876	George Coulthard	Carlton
1877	George Coulthard	Carlton
1878	H. P. Douglass	Geelong
1879	George Coulthard	Carlton
1880	James Wilson	Geelong
1881	James Wilson	Geelong
1882	James Wilson	Geelong
1883	John Baker	Carlton
1884	Jack Kerley	Geelong
1885	Peter Burns	South Melbourne
1886	Charlie Pearson	Essendon
1887	John Worrall	Fitzroy
1888	Dinny McKay ^{2}	South Melbourne
1889	Bill Hannaysee	Port Melbourne
1890	John Worrall	Fitzroy
1891	Peter Burns	South Melbourne
1892	Charlie Forbes	Essendon
1893	Albert Thurgood	Essendon
1894	Albert Thurgood	Essendon
1895	George Vautin	Essendon
1896	Bill Strickland	Collingwood
1897	Fred McGinis	Melbourne
1898	Dick Condon	Collingwood
1899	Mick Grace	Fitzroy
1900	Fred Leach	Collingwood
1901	Albert Thurgood	Essendon
1902	E. M. 'Ted' Rowell	Collingwood
1903	Hugh Gavin ^{3}	Essendon
1904	Vic Cumberland	St Kilda
1905	Percy Trotter	Fitzroy
1906	Jack McKenzie	Essendon
1907	Dave McNamara	St Kilda
1908	Bill Busbridge	Essendon
1909	Bill Busbridge	Essendon
1910	Dick Lee	Collingwood
1911	Bruce Sloss	South Melbourne
1912	Ernie Cameron	Essendon
1913	Vic Cumberland	St Kilda
1914	Dave McNamara	St Kilda
1915	Dick Lee	Collingwood
1916	Vic Thorp	Richmond
1917	Paddy O'Brien	Carlton
1918	Jack P. Howell	South Melbourne
1919	Vic Thorp	Richmond
1920	Roy Cazaly ^{4}	South Melbourne
1921	Horrie Clover	Carlton
1922	Goldie Collins	Fitzroy
1923	Tom Fitzmaurice	Essendon
1924	Tom Fitzmaurice	Essendon
1925	Colin Watson*	St Kilda
1926	Ivor Warne-Smith*	Melbourne
1927	Syd Coventry*	Collingwood
1928	Ivor Warne-Smith*	Melbourne
1929	Syd Coventry	Collingwood
1930	Allan Hopkins*	Footscray
1931	G. J. 'Jocka' Todd	Geelong
1932	Haydn Bunton, Sr.*	Fitzroy
1933	Gordon Coventry	Collingwood
1934	Laurie Nash	South Melbourne
1935	Laurie Nash	South Melbourne
1936	Harry Collier	Collingwood
1937	Dick Reynolds*	Essendon
1938	Jack Regan	Collingwood
1939	Dick Reynolds	Essendon
1940	Jack Dyer	Richmond
1941	Ted Cordner ^{5}	Melbourne
1942	Jack Dyer ^{5}	Richmond
1943	Jack Dyer	Richmond
1944	Norm Smith	Melbourne
1945	Jack Graham	South Melbourne
1946	Des Fothergill	Collingwood
1947	Don Cordner	Melbourne
1948	Ollie Grieve	Carlton
1949	Les Foote	North Melbourne
1950	Bill Hutchison	Essendon

* Player also won the Brownlow Medal that year.
^{1} While Tom Wills is listed as champion in 1856, he did not arrive in Victoria until 23 December 1856 after having spent the last seven years in England and Ireland.
^{2} The lists ending in 1940, 1949 and 1950 have the 1888 winner as Denis "Dinny" Mckay of South Melbourne, but the list ending in 1945 has his teammate Peter Burns as the 1888 winner.
^{3} While Hugh Gavin of Essendon is listed as champion in 1903, he did not play for Essendon that year: he played for Boulder City in the Goldfields of Western Australia.
^{4} While Roy Cazaly of South Melbourne is listed as champion in 1920, he did not play for South Melbourne until 1921: he played for St Kilda in 1911-1915 and 1918–1920.
^{5} The lists ending in 1949 and 1950 have the 1941 winner as Ted Cordner of Melbourne and the 1942 winner as Jack Dyer of Richmond, but the list ending in 1945 has the 1941 winner as Wally Buttsworth of Essendon and the 1942 winner as Ted Cordner.

== C. C. Mullen ==
The son of Alfred Raphael Mullen (1858–1913), and Eleanor Jane "Nellie" Mullen (1866–1938), née Rooking, Cecil Clarence Mullen was born in Richmond on 25 September 1895. He died at Kew on 4 April 1983. It is significant that, despite his birth and death records having him as Clarence Cecil Mullen, all of his electoral roll records have him as Cecil Clarence Mullen.

In addition to his work as a football umpire, journalist and football historian, he had a strong interest in (brass band) music, and was responsible for the formation of the Richmond Amateur Boy's Club — through which he was an early and significant influence on the cricket and the football of a number of prominent sportsmen, including George Bates, Syd Dineen, Neil Harvey, Tommy Lahiff, Jock McConchie, Bill Munn, Laurie Nash, Leo Opray, Ron Richards, Alby Pannam, George Smeaton, and Clarrie Vontom.

== See also ==
- History of Australian rules football in Victoria (1859–1900)
