= Les Jones =

Les Jones may refer to:

- Les Jones (footballer, born 1905) (1905–1993), Australian rules footballer for Hawthorn
- Les Jones (footballer, born 1907) (1907–1982), Australian rules footballer for North Melbourne
- Les Jones (footballer, born April 1910) (1910–1989), Australian rules footballer for St Kilda
- Les Jones (footballer, born February 1910) (1910–1956), Australian rules footballer for Melbourne
- Les Jones (footballer, born 1922) (1922–1989), Australian rules footballer for Richmond
- Les Jones (footballer, born 1940), Welsh football (soccer) player for Tranmere Rovers
- Les Jones (footballer, born 1930) (1930–2016), Welsh football (soccer) player for Luton Town
- Les Jones (Welsh footballer) (1922–1983), Welsh footballer
- Les Jones (rugby league, born 1948), English rugby league footballer who played in the 1960s, 1970s and 1980s
- Les Jones (rugby league, born c. 1920), rugby league footballer who played in the 1930s, 1940s and 1950s

== See also ==
- Leslie Jones (disambiguation)
