= McConchie =

McConchie is a surname. Notable people with the surname include:

- Cole McConchie (born 1992), New Zealand cricketer
- Dan McConchie, American politician
- Jack McConchie (1910–1998), Australian rules footballer
- Lorna McConchie (1914–2001), Australian netball player, coach and sports administrator
- Lyn McConchie (born 1946), New Zealand writer

== See also ==
- McConchie Ridge, a ridge in Antarctica
