= Love, Sex, and Aging =

Love, Sex, and Aging: A Consumer's Union Report
- Author: Edward M. Brecher
- Subject: Sexuality in older age
- Publisher: Little, Brown and Company
- Publication date: 1984
- Publication place: United States
- ISBN: 978-0316107198
- OCLC: 10625407

Love, Sex, and Aging is a 1984 book on sexuality in older age by medical writer Edward M. Brecher and the editors of Consumer Reports.

== History ==
The book presents survey research describing the attitudes and experiences of older people in the United States based on a 1977 Consumer Reports survey of over 4000 people. One reason for the study was to demonstrate that older people can have healthy sex lives. At the time and place of publication, this topic was not commonly discussed.

== Methodology ==
Many reviewers commented that the survey included a large and well-described sample. The survey included about 130 questions. Respondents ranged in age from 50 to 93.

The study recruited participants through solicitation in Consumer Reports. More than 4000 people participated in the survey. May Cohen described the study as the largest group of people over age 50 to answer questions on their sexuality. Wardell Pomeroy said the book contained a "treasure trove of findings" and that the chapter on postmenopausal hormone therapy is absolutely "first-rate." Ruth B. Weg noted that whereas other available data was clinical and did not give much personality to the data, this dataset contained social context for its information.
