= George O'Mullane =

Australian sportsman (1842–1866)

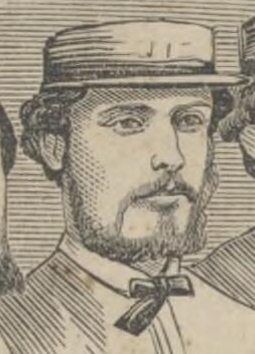
- O'Mullane, 1865

Personal information
- Full name: George Jeremiah Patrick O'Mullane
- Born: 3 December 1842; Melbourne, Port Phillip District, Colony of New South Wales
- Died: 20 December 1866 (aged 24); East Melbourne, Victoria, Australia

Domestic team information
- Years: Team
- 1865: Victoria
- Source: Cricinfo, 3 May 2015

George Jeremiah Patrick O'Mullane (3 December 1842 – 20 December 1866) was an Australian cricketer and Australian rules footballer. Born and raised in Melbourne, Victoria, O'Mullane was a standout cricketer from an early age, and came to be regarded as his colony's premier wicket-keeper. During the winter months, he excelled as a footballer in the nascent Australian game, receiving praise for his courage and strength.

O'Mullane's promising career was cut short when he died of tuberculosis, aged 24.

== Family and early years ==
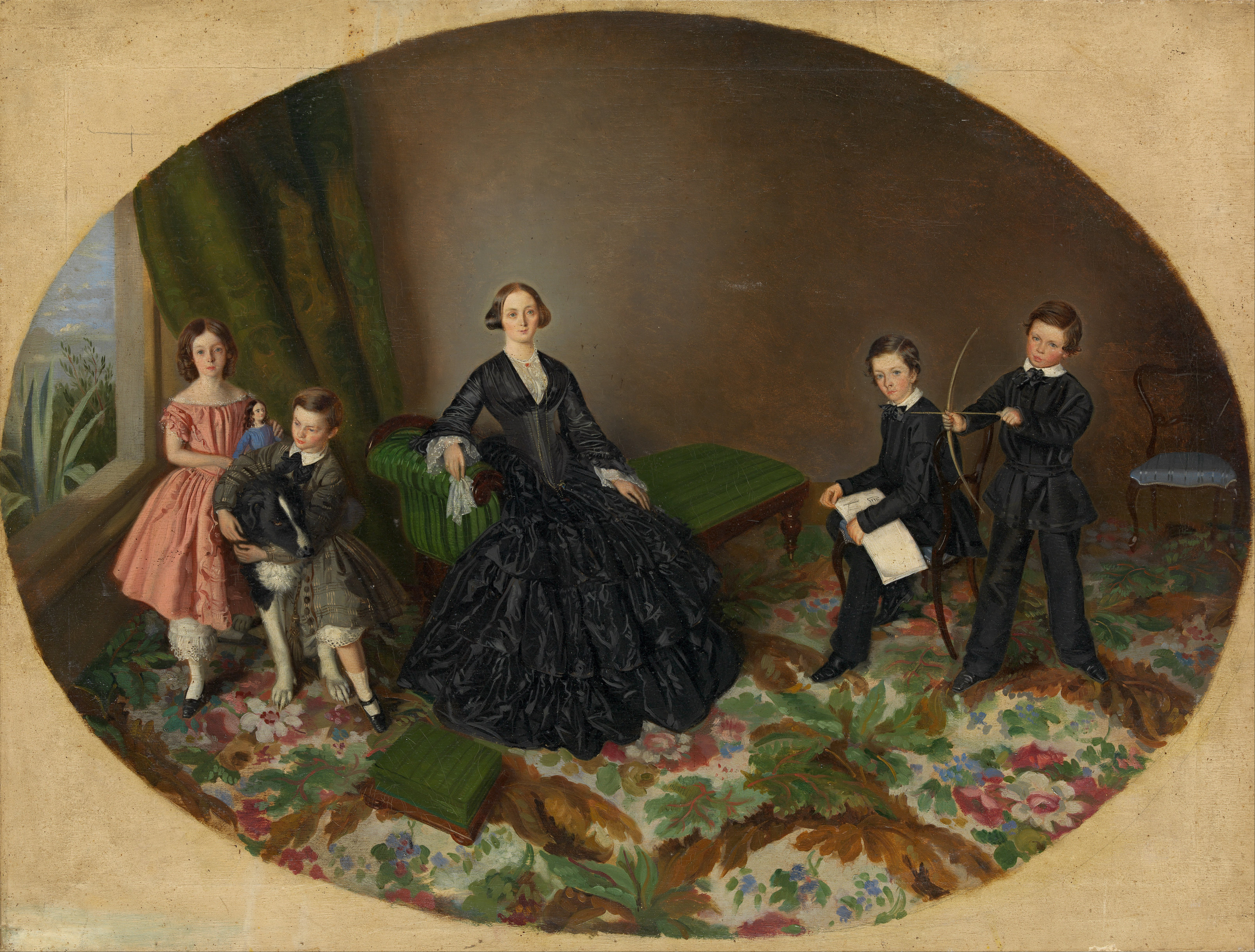
Portrait of Elizabeth O’Mullane and her children by William Strutt, c. 1852, National Gallery of Victoria. George is pictured far right with a bow and arrow.

O'Mullane was born in Melbourne on 3 December 1842, of Anglo-Celtic descent. He was one of five siblings. His father, Dr. Arthur O'Mullane of Cork, Ireland, graduated as a Doctor of Medicine at the University of Glasgow in 1838. The following year, he arrived in Australia's Port Phillip District aboard the William Metcalfe on 15 November, along with Miss Maria Elizabeth Barber, formerly of Keyingham near Hull, Yorkshire, whom he married in 1840. They settled in Melbourne, and Arthur established himself as a leading physician in the fledgling port city, taking up government and medical positions, and was one of the first honorary physicians elected to the Melbourne Hospital. He took up land speculation and became part-owner of the Port Phillip Gazette in the 1840s, and in 1852, purchased the Bourke Street residence of Sir Redmond Barry, the famous Supreme Court Judge and founder of the State Library of Victoria. Around this time, Elizabeth O'Mullane and her children, including George, were depicted in a family portrait by colonial artist William Strutt, now held at the National Gallery of Victoria.

George, along with his brother Arthur, attended the Melbourne Grammar School, and each successively captained the school's cricket team. One of their classmates, John Conway, also excelled at cricket, and would go on to play for Victoria alongside George.

== Cricket ==
O'Mullane joined the East Melbourne Cricket Club, which he went on to regularly captain, and was soon recognised as Victoria's premier wicket-keeper.

In 1861, while still a student at Melbourne Grammar School, O'Mullane represented Victoria against H. H. Stephenson's XI, the first English cricket team to tour Australia. It was during these matches against the English that O'Mullane's abilities as a cricketer were first widely recognised, and it was remarked that he played "as coolly as a veteran." O'Mullane was reported as being "up country" when George Parr's All-England Eleven was in Melbourne during the 1863–64 season, and therefore missed out on playing against the tourists.

When several professional members of the Victoria XI defected to New South Wales ahead of the December 1865 intercolonial match between the two colonies, O'Mullane was selected to play for Victoria at the insistence of its captain, Tom Wills. O'Mullane put in a career-best performance behind the wickets and ended on 33 not out in a thrilling partnership with Wills, who scored the first half century in intercolonial cricket (58), leading Victoria to an against-the-odds win. It was to be O'Mullane's solitary first-class appearance.

O'Mullane played in his last club cricket match in October 1866.

A left-handed batsman, O'Mullane played without any pretense to style according to cricketer and journalist William Hammersley, but "was a hard, determined hitter ... a very fast run-getter, and fond of taking liberties with the bowling." He was not the most elegant wicket-keeper, but "hard as nails", unflinching and equally good on the leg side as on the off. Though he could successfully keep wicket for all types of bowlers, he had a perceived preference for pacemen. As a captain, wrote The Australasian, O'Mullane was prone to causing disputes with an "energy of character" that was not always "tempered by tact and discretion". At his club, East Melbourne, he was considered "a bit of a 'martinet' ... but all the same a real good skipper."

== Football ==
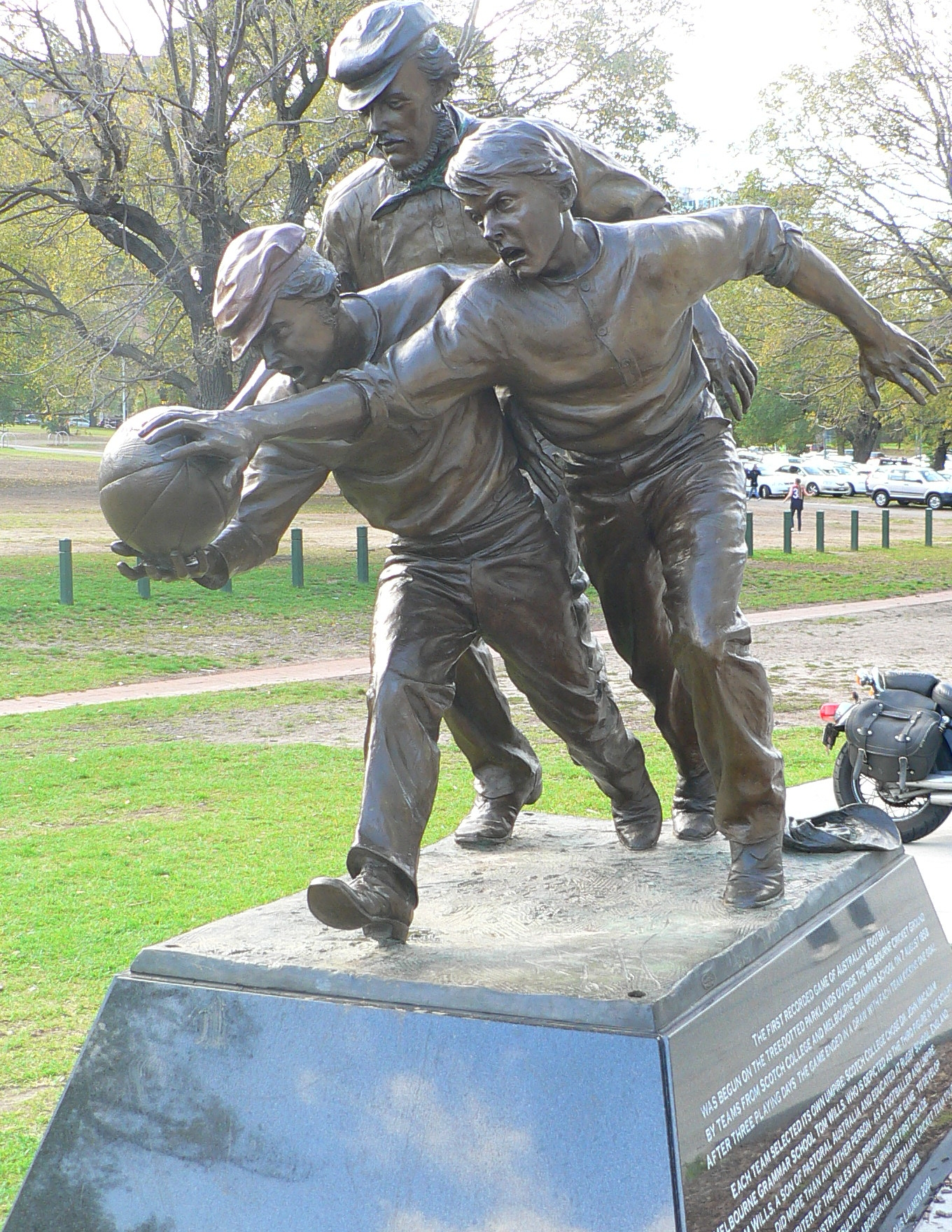
As a schoolboy, O'Mullane played in the famous 1858 match between Melbourne Grammar and Scotch College, commemorated by this statue outside the Melbourne Cricket Ground. Tom Wills is depicted umpiring behind two students contesting the football.

In August 1858, O'Mullane played for Melbourne Grammar against Scotch College in what is claimed by some to be the first match of Australian rules football. This 40-a-side contest, played over three consecutive Saturdays on the Richmond Paddock next to the Melbourne Cricket Ground, ended in a draw with each team scoring one goal. One spectator recalled:

O'Mullane got the ball down near the Melbourne Cricket Ground fence, ran round the east side of the cricket ground amongst the trees, and then came back surreptitiously and kicked a goal. ... Tommy Wills, who was central umpire, decided that past the cricket ground fence was out of bounds, and the goal was disallowed.

While O'Mullane represented several football clubs during his career (as was common in those days), including St Kilda and Melbourne, he is most often associated with South Yarra. Apart from being a standout player, O'Mullane also worked as a club administrator and umpired matches between other teams. In May 1866, when the code was updated at a meeting of eight club delegates chaired by H. C. A. Harrison, O'Mullane was one of two players appointed to represent South Yarra. In September of that year, in his last match, he captained the club to victory against Melbourne to gain permanent possession of the Challenge Cup. The club's fortunes declined soon after his death four months later and South Yarra folded at the start of 1873, having not won a match since 1868.

O'Mullane "loved nothing more than a rough, tough, energetic game", and it was said that only Tom Wills could match his "pluck and skill" as a footballer. According to a teammate, O'Mullane's reputation as a first-rate boxer was enough to dissuade the opposition from getting into melees with his club. Harrison remembered O'Mullane as a strong, but good-tempered player, and stated that "it was a pleasure to meet him on the football field—even when the meeting was shoulder to shoulder, and you happened to get the trifle worst of it."

O'Mullane was retrospectively named a "Champion of the Colony" for 1861 in early football historian C. C. Mullen's subjective season-by-season ranking of players, and in The Australian Game of Football Since 1858 (2008), published by the AFL, he was placed among the five best players of the 1860s. There have been calls for O'Mullane to be inducted into the Australian Football Hall of Fame, along with other "neglected heroes" of the game's pioneering phase.

== Death ==
O'Mullane died of tuberculosis at his East Melbourne residence on 20 December 1866, aged twenty-four. His obituary in The Australasian remembered him as "undoubtedly the best wicket-keeper Victoria has produced", and stated that "it would be difficult to name his superior [at football] in the colony". William Hammersley agreed:

As a cricketer—especially a wicket-keeper—and a football player combined, it will be long, I think, ere we look upon his like again.

== See also ==
- List of Australian rules footballers and cricketers
- List of Victoria first-class cricketers

== Bibliography ==
Books

- Blainey, Geoffrey (2003). A Game of Our Own: The Origins of Australian Football. Black Inc. ISBN 978-1-86395-347-4.
- Hess, Rob; Stewart, Bob (1998). More Than a Game: The Real Story of Australian Rules Football. Melbourne University Publishing. ISBN 9780522847727.
- Hess, Rob (2008). A National Game: The History of Australian Rules Football. Viking. ISBN 978-0-670-07089-3.
- Weston, James (2008). The Australian Game of Football: Since 1858. Geoff Slattery Publishing. ISBN 978-0-9803466-6-4.
- Pennings, Mark (2012). Origins of Australian Football: Victoria's Early History: Volume 1: Amateur Heroes and the Rise of Clubs, 1858 to 1876. Connor Court Publishing Pty Ltd. ISBN 9781921421471.

Journals

- Hibbins, Gillian; Ruddell, Trevor (2009). ""A Code of Our Own": Celebrating 150 Years of the Rules of Australian Football" (PDF). The Yorker (39). Melbourne Cricket Club.
- Phipps, Jennifer (1977). "Portrait of Maria Elizabeth O'Mullane and her children c. 1852". Art Bulletin of Victoria (18). National Gallery of Victoria.
- Pennings, Mark (2013). "Fuschias, Pivots, Same Olds and Gorillas: The Early Years of Football in Victoria" (PDF). Tablet to Scoreboard. 1 (1).

Webpages

- Cardosi, Adam (2014). "Neglected heroes: The sad case of the Australian Football Hall of Fame". Australian Football.
