= Leslie Jones =

Leslie Jones may refer to:

- Leslie Jones (conductor) (1905–1982), English lawyer and conductor
- Leslie Jones (cricketer) (1891–1962), English cricketer
- Leslie Jones (footballer) (1911–1981), Welsh footballer
- Leslie Jones (comedian) (born 1967), American comedian and actress
- Leslie Jones (film editor), American film editor
- Leslie Ronald Jones (1886–1967), American photographer
- Leslie Ann Jones, American record producer
- Leslie N. Jones, member of the Illinois House of Representatives

== See also ==
- Les Jones (disambiguation)
- Lesley-Ann Jones (born 1956), English journalist and author
