= Frances Steloff: Memoirs of a Bookseller =

1987 film

- Produced by: Deborah Dickson
- Distributed by: Direct Cinema Limited
- Release date: 1987
- Running time: 28 minutes
- Country: United States
- Language: English

Frances Steloff: Memoirs of a Bookseller is a 1987 American short documentary film produced by Deborah Dickson. It follows Frances Steloff, the founder of the Gotham Book Mart in New York City, a center for avant-garde literature and literati since 1920. It was nominated for an Academy Award for Best Documentary Short.
