= Sylvia Cassedy =

American writer

- Born: January 29, 1930; Brooklyn, NY
- Died: April 6, 1989 (aged 59); Manhasset, NY
- Education: Brooklyn College
- Writing career
- Genres: Children's and young adult fiction

Sylvia Cassedy (January 29, 1930 – April 6, 1989) was an American novelist and poet, who is best known for her children's and young adult fiction.

== Life ==
Cassedy was born January 29, 1930, in Brooklyn, New York. She graduated from Brooklyn College, and worked as a primary and secondary school teacher.

Cassedy is known for her young adult novels. Her three novels Behind the Attic Wall, M.E. and Morton, and Lucie Babbidge's House feature preadolescent girls as protagonists, who use fantasy and play to improve their circumstances.

Besides her young adult novels, Cassedy wrote two volumes of poetry. She translated collections of poems from India and from Japan. Based on her teaching experience, she wrote a guide to creative writing In Your Own Words: a Beginner's Guide to Writing.

Cassedy died April 6, 1989, in Manhasset, NY. Her collected papers are held by the University of Minnesota.

== Awards ==
Cassedy's book Lucie Babbidge's House was named an honor book (runner-up) for the Phoenix Award of the Children's Literature Association in 2009.

== Selected works ==
=== Children's and young adult fiction ===
- Behind the Attic Wall (HarperCollins, 1985). ISBN 0380698439
- M.E. and Morton (HarperCollins, 1987). ISBN 069004562X
- Lucie Babbidge's House (HarperCollins, 1989). ISBN 038071812X
- The Best Cat Suit of All (Dial Books, 1991). Illustrated by Rosekrans Hoffman. ISBN 0803705166

=== Instructional ===
- In Your Own Words: A Beginner's Guide to Writing (Doubleday, 1979). ISBN 0385140371

=== Poetry ===
- Roomrimes: Poems (Crowell, 1987). Illustrated by Michele Chessare. ISBN 0690044666
- Zoomrimes: Poems about Things that Go (HarperCollins, 1993). Illustrated by Michele Chessare. ISBN 0060226331

=== Translation ===
- Red Dragonfly on my Shoulder, with Kunihiro Suetake (HarperCollins, 1992). Illustrated by Molly Bang. ISBN 0060226242
  Revised and retitled from Birds, Frogs, and Moonlight by the same authors (Doubleday, 1967). Illustrated by Vo-Dinh.
- Moon-Uncle, Moon-Uncle, with Parvathi Thampi (Doubleday, 1972). Illustrated by Susanne Suba. ISBN 0385029632
