= Edward M. Brecher =

- Born: Edward M. Brecher; 1912
- Died: April 15, 1989 (aged 77); West Cornwall, Connecticut
- Education: University of Minnesota
- Children: 3
- Writing career
- Notable works: The Sex Researchers, Licit and Illicit Drugs, Love, Sex and Aging

Edward M. Brecher (1912–1989) was an American science writer and book author, best known for his contributions in addiction research, human sexuality, and for his advocacy of rights for people who choose to commit suicide.

== Works And Awards ==
According to his The New York Times obituary "Mr. Brecher collaborated on books and articles with his wife, Ruth Ernestine Cook Brecher, who died in 1966. They received the Albert Lasker Award for medical journalism in 1963 and the Robert T. Morse Writer's Award of the American Psychiatric Association, which cited them as "scholarly crusaders for a better life for all Americans."

In 1968, he signed the "Writers and Editors War Tax Protest" pledge, vowing to refuse tax payments in protest against the Vietnam War.

Among Brecher's best-known works were two books published by Consumers Union, The Consumers Union Report on Licit and Illicit Drugs (1972) and Love, Sex and Aging (1984). An editorial published in The New York Times after his death observed:

Edward Brecher, who recently ended his own life before cancer could take it from him, had a celebrated career as a writer on a variety of scientific topics. But in 1972 he left a monument as the author of the Consumer Union book Licit and Illicit Drugs.

That towering work of scholarship laid out most of what has been learned - and selectively forgotten - about heroin, caffeine, nicotine, alcohol, barbiturates, amphetamines, tranquilizers, cocaine, LSD and marijuana.

But Mr. Brecher was more than a compiler of facts, and Licit and Illicit Drugs is more than a primer on addiction. He pierced the veil of moral righteousness and special pleading that still colors drug policy, offering sober prescriptions for limiting the damage that many Americans still don't want to hear.

The editorial concluded: "Good or bad, marijuana is here to stay. The billions spent to fight it are wasted dollars. Indeed, they may be worse than wasted: properly regulated, marijuana might serve as a less dangerous substitute for alcohol."

An earlier book by Mr. Brecher, The Sex Researchers was first published by Little, Brown in 1969, and updated one year before his suicide. It remains a standard textbook for the training of sex education educators.

== Death ==
In a 1979 article in The New York Times Magazine, Brecher, who was diagnosed with colon cancer a year earlier, argued that people with terminal illnesses should have the right to end their lives in the manner, time, and, place of their choosing. The article predicted how he would end his own life, which he did 10 years later, in his West Cornwall, Connecticut home.

== List of works ==
- Licit and Illicit Drugs
- Brecher, Edward M. The Sex Researchers. New American Library. ISBN 978-0317341508.
- Brecher, Edward M. (1984). Love, sex, and aging : a Consumers Union report. the editors of Consumer Reports. Mt. Vernon, N.Y.: Consumers Union. ISBN 978-0890430279.
- Brecher, Edward; Brecher, Ruth (1969). The Rays: A History of Radiology in the United States and Canada. Baltimore: The Williams and Wilkins Company. ISBN 978-0683010503.
