= Death In Beirut =

Book by Tawfiq Yusuf Awwad

- Author: Tawfiq Yusuf 'Awwad
- Language: Arabic
- Genre: fiction
- Publication date: 1972
- Publication place: Lebanon

Death in Beirut (Arabic: طواحين بيروت; literally "The Mills of Beirut") is a 1972 novel by the Lebanese writer Tawfiq Yusuf 'Awwad. It is number 29 on the list of the best 105 Arabic novels in the history of Arabic literature, based on the ranking of the Arab Writers Union. UNESCO has chosen this novel in the series "The Works of Writers Most Representing Their Time".

The novel was Awwad's second, written thirty years after his first. It was originally written in 1969 in Japan while Awwad was on diplomatic duty. It evokes a Beirut of night bars, student life, sectarian and class divisions, sketching out the first lines of what would later be called the literature of war. It was this work that secured for Awwad his lasting and distinguished position among 20th-century Arab writers.

== Ideas ==
The novel exemplifies the aesthetic of alienation (Arabic: اغتراب) that became prominent in Arabic literature in the 1970s, a withdrawal into the author's own inner universe as a response to violence and factionalism. Notably, written shortly before the outbreak of the Lebanese civil war, it foresaw the breakdown of Lebanese society into the violent conflict that emerged soon after. The novel also explores how violence has its roots in sexual violence and the treatment of women.

== Plot ==
The novel's main character is Tamimah Nassour, a Shiite Muslim teenager from a village in southern Lebanon. Against the wishes of her mother and brother, she decides to move to Beirut to attend university there. She rents a room in a building owned by Rose Khoury, a former procuress who claims to have repented her old ways. She soon begins an affair with an older man who also rents a room from Rose, firebrand journalist Ramzi Ra'ad. After being injured by a stone thrown at a protest, Tamimah is taken to the hospital, where she meets Hani al-Ra'i, a Maronite Christian student. They begin a mostly platonic relationship. This angers her brother Jaber, a ne'er-do-well gambler and womanizer, who believes her behavior is besmirching his family's honor. Meanwhile, Tamimah begins working as a typist at the port workers' union, and becomes more politically engaged.

In addition to telling the story of Tamimah's coming-of-age, the novel also discusses Lebanese politics, and a reform effort among university students led by Hani al-Ra'i.

Both Tamimah and Hani come from outside of Beirut: Hani from the village of Mutla in the northern Matn, a predominantly Christian area in the mountains, and Tamimah from the village of Mahdiyya in southern Lebanon, a mostly Shiite area. Both suffer from the change in the atmosphere of life due to the transition from the simplicity of the village to the hustle of the city while they are working for change, and reform. The novel discusses what 'Awwad refers to as "the factories of intolerance and the street demagoguery, and the traditional leaders and influential merchants" who infiltrated the ranks of the students, motivated by their partisan interests, their own lusts, and their ideologies.

When Hani learns of Tamimah's affair with Ramzi Ra'ad, he spurns her and slaps her face. She leaves his house and returns to her apartment, which she shares with her roommate and friend, Mary. The novel ends with Jaber and his friend Hussein attempting to murder Tamimah in an honor killing. However, Jaber instead shoots and kills Mary. A neighbor seizes Jaber and tells Tamimah to flee. The final entry in her diary is addressed to Hani. She writes that she has decided to join the fedayeen, Palestinian fighters resisting Israel's incursions into southern Lebanon, a decision she connects to the violence she experienced at the hands of both her brother and Hani. She sends the diary to Hani, telling him that she will never be heard from again.

== Translations ==
The novel has been translated into English, (as "Death in Beirut") German, French (as "Dans les meules de Beyrouth"), and Russian.
