= T. Amrutha Rao =

Member of the Andhra Pradesh Legislative Assembly for Tadikonda
- In office 1978–1983
- Preceded by: position established
- Succeeded by: J. R. Pushpa Raju

Personal details
- Born: 21 October 1920 Visadala, Guntur district, Andhra Pradesh, India
- Died: 27 April 1989 (aged 68) Guntur, Andhra Pradesh, India
- Resting place: Guntur
- Party: Indian National Congress
- Children: T Xavier (son)
- Known for: Hunger strike for demanding a steel plant at Visakhapatnam.

Tamanampalli Amrutha Rao (21 October 1920 – 27 April 1989), was an Indian politician and freedom fighter. He served as a Member of Legislative Assembly during 1978-1983 from Tadikonda. He served as the first chairman of Scheduled castes corporation in Andhra Pradesh. He became famous for undertaking a hunger strike in support of demanding a steel plant at Visakhapatnam. He was the architect of the slogan "Visakha Ukku-Andhrula Hakku".

== Early life ==
Amrutha Rao was born to Smt. Annamma and Sri. Airappa in 1920 at Visadala village in Guntur district of Madras Presidency(now Andhra Pradesh, India). He was born in a Hindu family of Dalit community. He participated in Quit India Movement and went to jail at very young age. He established Gandhi Mission and participated in various social activities for which he got appreciation from Jawaharlal Nehru and Dr. Rajendra Prasad.

His struggle started from demanding a separate statehood for Telugu-speaking people. He wrote a letter to then chief minister of Madras state Sri. Tanguturi Prakasam with his blood demanding a separate state. He also agitated at chief minister's office, later withdrew his initiation at the request of chief minister.

== Demand for Steel plant ==
During 1966 he was on fast for 21 days for establishment of Steel Plant at Visakhapatnam. He was arrested and sent to Karimnagar Jail for starting of hunger strike. He was again arrested in Guntur and sent to Warangal and thereon to Rajahmundry Central Jail. On the assurance from Smt. Indira Gandhi, he broke his fast.
