= Licit and Illicit Drugs =

1972 book by Edward M. Brecher

Licit and Illicit Drugs: The Consumers Union Report on Narcotics, Stimulants, Depressants, Inhalants, Hallucinogens, and Marijuana–including Caffeine, Nicotine and Alcohol
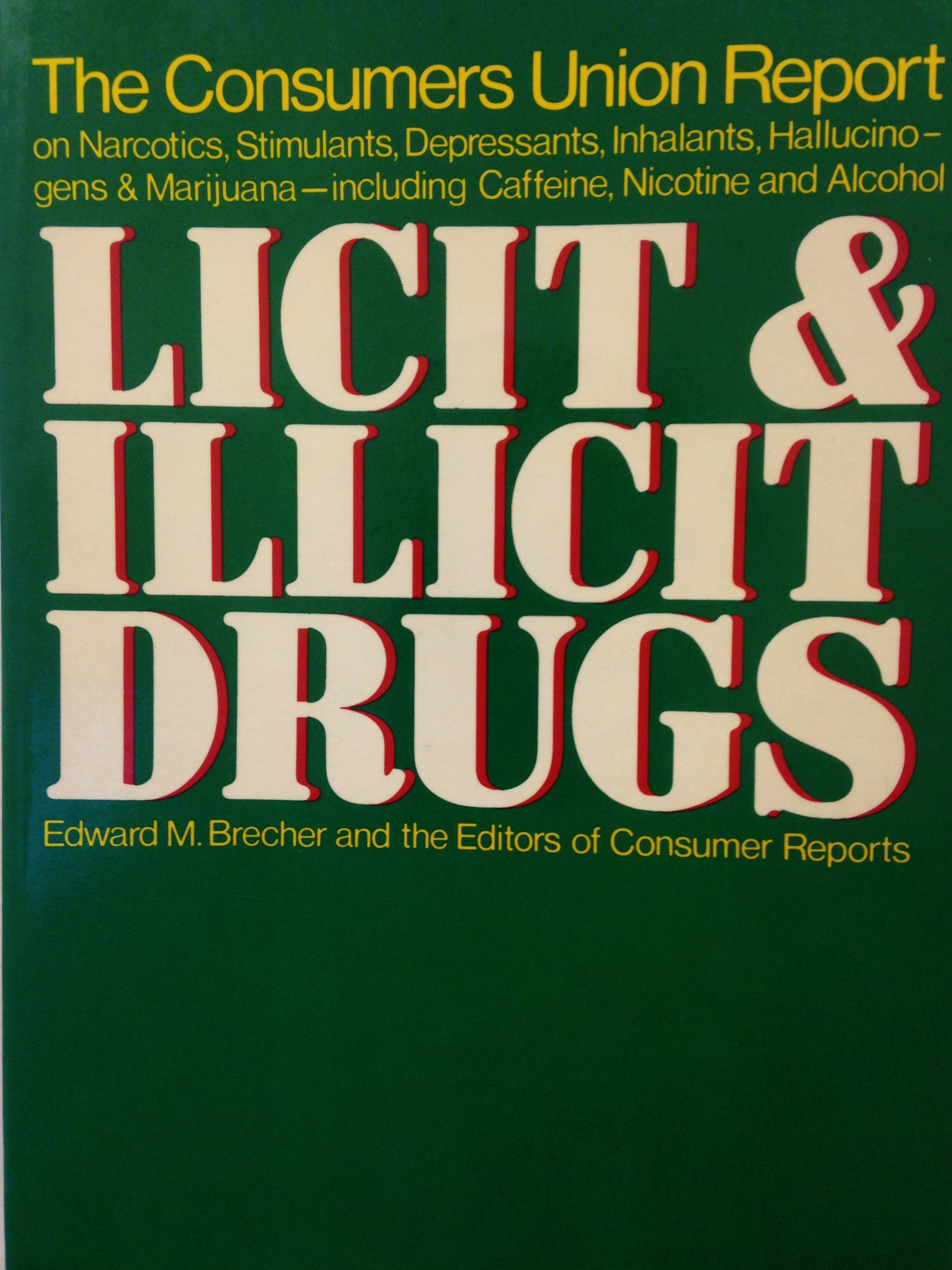
- Author: Edward M. Brecher
- Subject: Recreational drug use
- Publisher: Little, Brown and Company
- Publication date: 1972
- Publication place: United States
- Pages: 623
- ISBN: 978-0316107174

Licit and Illicit Drugs: The Consumers Union Report on Narcotics, Stimulants, Depressants, Inhalants, Hallucinogens, and Marijuana–including Caffeine, Nicotine and Alcohol is a 1972 book on recreational drug use by medical writer Edward M. Brecher and the editors of Consumer Reports.

== Summary ==
The book describes the effects and risks of psychoactive drugs which were common in contemporary use for recreational and nonmedical purposes. The New York Times paraphrased some major arguments from the book, saying "'Drug-free' treatment of heroin addiction almost never works", "Nicotine can be as tough to beat as heroin", and "Good or bad, marijuana is here to stay. The billions spent to fight it are wasted dollars." The book identifies marijuana as the most popular drug after tobacco, alcohol, and nicotine. A reviewer for the Journal of the American Medical Association summarized it by saying that "Brecher holds that the division of drugs into licit and illicit categories is medically irrational and rooted mainly in historical and sociological factors."

The book's 10 main sections are titled as follows:

1. The Narcotics: Opium, Morphine, Heroin, Methadone, and Others
2. Caffeine
3. Nicotine
4. Alcohol, the Barbiturates, The Tranquilizers, and Other Sedatives and Hypnotics
5. Coca Leaves, Cocaine, The Amphetamines, "Speed", and Cocaine Again
6. Inhalants and Solvents and Glue Sniffing
7. LSD and LSD-like Drugs
8. Marijuana and Hashish
9. The Drug Scene
10. Conclusions and Recommendations

== Reception ==
In the Annals of Internal Medicine a reviewer said that the book should be read by every physician who cares for adolescents. In another journal a reviewer described the book as an "important work (which) stresses the historical and social perspectives on the drugs of abuse as well as the current laws, attitudes, and policies concerning all commonly used and abused drugs" and that he was "impressed with the conclusions concerning the failure of the judicial and penal systems" and "that both sides of many controversial issues are presented." Kirkus Reviews described the book as "Liberal in the best sense, rigorously researched, and free from cant, the Consumer Union Report should become a standard referral."

== See also ==
- List of books about cannabis
