= Les Jones (Welsh footballer, born 1922) =

Welsh footballer

Personal information
- Full name: Leslie Jones
- Date of birth: 8 December 1922
- Place of birth: Ynysybwl, Wales
- Date of death: 1983 (aged 60–61)
- Place of death: Pontypridd, Wales
- Position: Inside forward

Senior career*
Years	Team	Apps	(Gls)
–1947	Barry		
1947–1952	Millwall	9	(1)

International career
1950–1951	Wales Amateurs	4	(0)
- * Club domestic league appearances and goals

Leslie Jones (8 December 1922 – 1983) was a Welsh amateur footballer who played in the Football League for Millwall as an inside forward. He was capped by Wales at amateur level.

== Career statistics ==
Appearances and goals by club, season and competition
Club	Season	League			National cup (Note: Includes FA Cup)		Total	
Club	Season	Division	Apps	Goals	Apps	Goals	Apps	Goals
Millwall	1948–49	Third Division South	4	0	0	0	4	0
Millwall	1949–50	Third Division South	1	0	0	0	1	0
Millwall	1950–51	Third Division South	3	1	1	0	4	1
Millwall	1951–52	Third Division South	1	0	1	0	2	0
Millwall	Total		9	1	2	0	11	1
Career total			9	1	2	0	11	1
