= Gotham Book Mart =

Former bookstore in Manhattan, New York (1920–2007)

Coordinates: 40.7555°N 73.9780°W

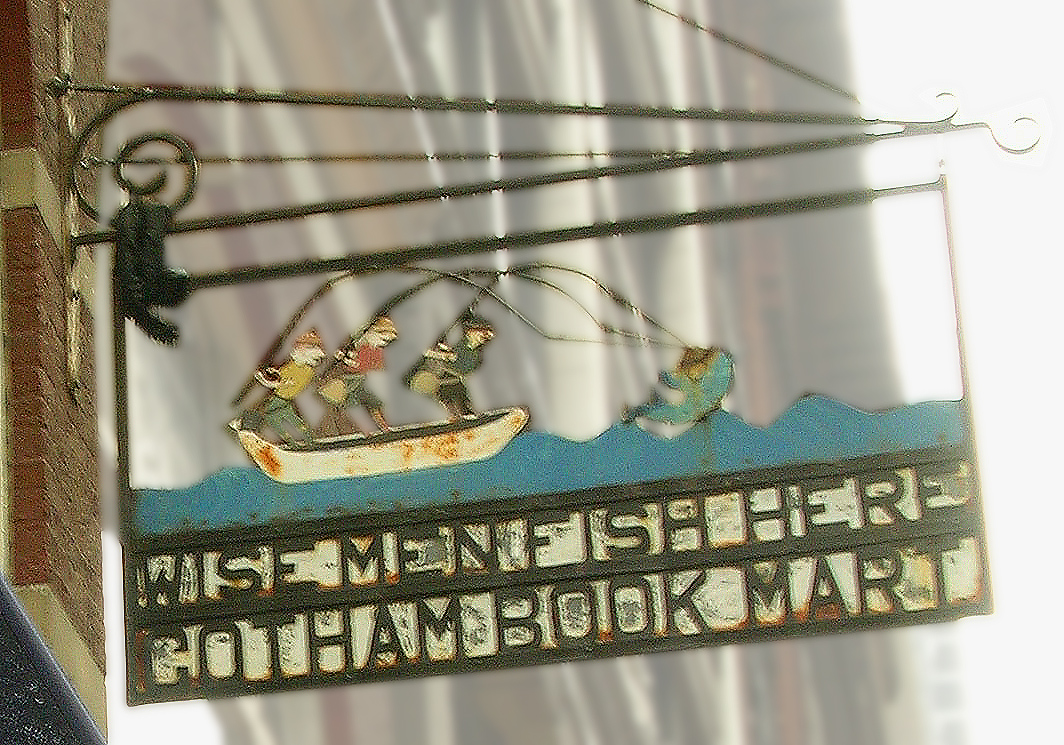
- "Wise Men Fish Here" sign, 2007
- Type: Independent bookstore
- Founded: January 1, 1920
- Founder: Frances Steloff
- Defunct: May 22, 2007
- Headquarters: Midtown Manhattan, New York City
- Key people: Frances Steloff (founder, 1920–1967); Andreas Brown (owner, 1967–2007)
- Products: New books; out-of-print and rare books; poetry; theater; art; music; dance

The Gotham Book Mart was a Midtown Manhattan bookstore and cultural landmark that operated from 1920 to 2007. The business was located first in a small basement space on West 45th Street near the Theater District in Manhattan; it later spent many years at 41 West 47th Street within the Diamond District, before finally moving to 16 East 46th Street.

Beyond merely selling books, the store virtually functioned as a literary salon, hosting poetry and author readings, art exhibits, and more. It was known for its distinctive sign above the door, which read, "Wise Men Fish Here" (sign created by artist John Held Jr.). The store specialized in poetry, literature, books about theater, art, music, and dance. It sold both new books as well as out-of-print and rare books.

== History ==
The store was opened January 1, 1920, by Frances Steloff. Steloff's husband, David Moss, suggested both the store's name and its "Wise Men ..." motto, which was inspired by Washington Irving. Steloff nurtured the store as a literary sanctuary for the avant-garde, distributing copies of the banned Lady Chatterley's Lover, Henry Miller's Tropic of Cancer, and safeguarding Anaïs Nin's books when she fled Paris. Under Steloff's oversight, the store became a meeting place for the literati and 20th-century cultural icons, essentially serving as a literary salon.

In February 1947, the James Joyce Society was founded at the Gotham; John J. Slocum (a Joyce bibliographer) was its first president and Steloff its first treasurer. The first member was T. S. Eliot.

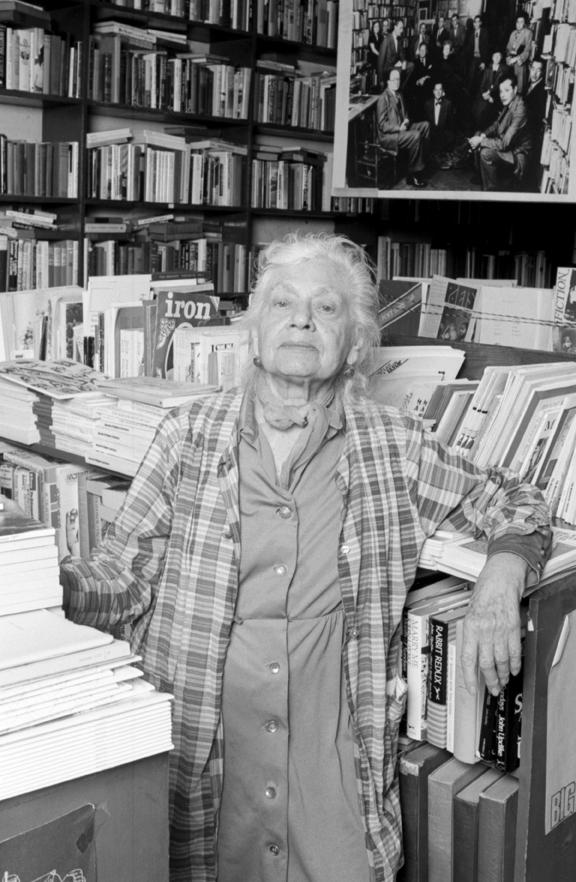
Steloff at the store in 1978

The success of the store was partly due to Steloff's demanding nature and attention to quality, as well as business acumen. Steloff lived in an apartment above the store and later sold it in 1967 to book lover Andreas Brown. Upon selling the store to Brown, Steloff told him that he was not the owner, but the caretaker or custodian. Steloff continued working at the store as a consultant after selling it.

Arthur Miller said that the store was an invaluable source of books "... for research of all kinds, and perhaps above all for literature that is more than a few months old. It's impossible to imagine New York City without it." The director Woody Allen, a frequent customer of film books at the shop, referred to it as "everyone's fantasy of what the ideal bookshop is."

After Steloff died in 1989 at age 101, Brown moved into the apartment above the shop, living there until later selling the building.

The shop was full of photos of the authors and other notable figures who frequented it, as well as signage and other visual puns that were full of literary humor and references, such as the names of Steloff's and Brown's cats: Thornton (Wilder), Christopher (Morley), Mitchell (Kennerley), and (Thomas) Pynchon. A great deal of the shop's inventory was in storage unavailable to the general public, as the proprietors obtained stock from literary estates, general overflow stock, and other books set aside for future sale after appreciating. Brown sometimes referred to book storage cellars as "the catacombs".

The Gotham was credited for promoting and building the success and career of author/artist Edward Gorey. Gorey and Brown became friends, so the store favored Gorey after Brown assumed ownership. The store became the commercial flagship of Gorey's works, selling his books, calendars, greeting cards, T-shirts, and other products. The store published 15 of Gorey's books, and the store gallery hosted exhibitions of Gorey's illustrations, as well as public signings by the author. Brown was named as one of the coexecutors of Gorey's estate, after he died in 2000.

The history of the store is covered in the 1987 documentary film, Frances Steloff: Memoirs of a Bookseller, directed by Deborah Dickson.

=== Closing ===
In 2006, the store fell behind in its monthly $51,000 (~$81,450 in 2025) rent, and the landlords initiated eviction proceedings. A judge authorized the city marshal to seize the inventory.

There were various stories for why Brown fell behind in the rent. According to him, he had recently endured three hernia operations and was struggling to save the store from closing by inventorying the over $3 million worth of books and posting them on the internet. In the months since the move from the previous location, the staff appeared to have failed to get any of the inventory online. By other accounts, he may have lost momentum after the transition of selling and moving from the old building, and he may have invested too much in more book inventory. Other factors that could have been involved included the fact that Barnes & Noble opened a bookstore just around the corner from the Gotham, and also that general book-buying habits of consumers had shifted with the advent of the internet age.

The primary factors affecting the store appear to have been a combination of rising Manhattan real estate rents, competition from book superstores, and Brown's mismanagement of the business—factors that influenced the closures of a number of other venerable bookstores during the same period.

On May 22, 2007, the city auctioned off the store's inventory to a small crowd, each of whom had put down a $1,000 (~$1,553 in 2025) deposit in order to attend. Attendees included book collectors and other bookstore owners. Ultimately, the estimated $3 million worth of inventory was all bought up in one large lot for a bid of only $400,000 by the representative of the landlords.

=== Gotham Book Mart Collection ===
In late 2008, the University of Pennsylvania received over 200,000 items from the Gotham Book Mart's inventory as an anonymous gift. Penn will catalog the Gotham Book Mart Collection and make it available for teaching and research. Penn will also digitize materials from the Collection and create public events such as lectures and exhibits based on its contents.

In the spring of 2019, Penn Libraries displayed a selection from the Gotham Book Mart Collection at the Kislak Center for Rare Books, Collections and Manuscripts. The exhibit, called "Wise Men Fish Here", contained 300 items and was hosted at the Van Pelt Library.

== Building ==
The building at 41 West 47th Street that housed the Gotham Book Mart for the longest period of its existence was purchased by Steloff from Columbia University in 1946 for $65,000. Somewhere in between, after selling the store to Andreas Brown, Steloff donated the building to the American Friends of the Hebrew University Foundation with the proviso that they give Brown the option to later buy it back at $1,000,000. In 1987, Steloff filed suit to enforce the intended proviso, and the two parties apparently settled. In 1988, Andreas Brown bought the building back from them for $1,000,000 (~$2.35 million in 2025).

In 1995, Joanne Carson (second wife of Johnny Carson) filed suit against Brown, alleging she had loaned him $640,000 in 1988 and 1991 to purchase and repair the building, and she wanted her money returned with interest. Carson had apparently become acquainted with Brown through their mutual friendship with Truman Capote. Brown and Carson met after Capote's death while Brown was appraising Capote's papers. In 1997, the suit was settled, with Brown agreeing to pay her back $1.4 million by February 28 of the year 2000.

In 2001, Brown put the five-story town house building up for sale with an asking price of $7.9 million (~$13.7 million in 2025). In 2003, the building was sold for $7.2 million (~$12.1 million in 2025) to Boris Aranov, who also owned another adjacent building.

Brown reopened the store under a slightly new name, "The Gotham Book Mart & Gallery", in 2004, just a few blocks away at 16 East 46th Street in the store space previously occupied by the H. P. Kraus rare books store. Leonard Lauder, a cosmetics industry billionaire and executive of Estée Lauder Companies, and Edmondo Schwartz, a real estate developer, arranged to buy the building for $5.2 million in order to assist the Gotham and Brown by leasing it back to him.

== Awards ==
- New York Magazine's Best of New York: Independent Bookstore, 2000.

== Major authors and celebrities linked to the store ==
Many notable authors, celebrities, and major figures involved in publishing were customers of the store and friends with the owners and staff. The Nobel Prize committee in Stockholm was known to order copies of books from the Gotham when they were considering various authors for the prize.

Authors and celebrities who frequented and shopped at the store:

- Edward Albee
- Woody Allen
- W. H. Auden
- Warren Beatty
- Saul Bellow
- Alexander Calder
- Truman Capote
- Dick Cavett
- Charlie Chaplin
- Ina Claire
- Jean Cocteau
- Melora Creager
- E. E. Cummings
- Don DeLillo
- Theodore Dreiser
- Buckminster Fuller
- Abigail Folger (worked as a clerk at the Gotham)
- Allen Ginsberg (worked as a clerk at the Gotham)
- John Guare
- George Gershwin & Ira Gershwin
- Edward Gorey
- Martha Graham
- Lillian Hellman
- Katharine Hepburn
- LeRoi Jones (worked as a clerk at the Gotham)
- Garson Kanin
- Alison Lurie
- Norman Mailer
- H. L. Mencken
- Arthur Miller
- Henry Moore
- Marianne Moore
- Christopher Morley
- David Nolan
- Eugene O'Neill
- Anaïs Nin
- Jacqueline Kennedy Onassis
- John Dos Passos
- George Plimpton
- Ezra Pound
- Man Ray
- Philip Roth
- J. D. Salinger
- Marian Seldes
- Dame Edith Sitwell
- Patti Smith (worked at Scribner's, around the corner, as documented in her memoir, Just Kids; she hung out at Gotham Book Mart, and they later published her chapbook Witt)
- Stephen Spender
- Gertrude Stein
- Dylan Thomas
- John Updike
- Rudolph Valentino
- Gore Vidal
- Jose Garcia Villa
- Andy Warhol
- Edmund White
- Thornton Wilder
- Tennessee Williams (worked as a clerk at the store, lasting less than a day)

== See also ==
- Books in the United States
