= Lester Warden =

Australian cricketer

Personal information
- Born: 14 April 1940; Clayfield, Queensland, Australia
- Died: 3 April 1989 (aged 48); Brisbane, Queensland, Australia
- Source: Cricinfo, 8 October 2020

Lester Griffith Warden (14 April 1940 – 3 April 1989) was an Australian cricketer. He played in two first-class matches for Queensland between 1961 and 1963.

== Cricket career ==
In December 1952, Warden was selected in a practice squad by the Queensland Schools' Cricket Association from which the Queensland Primary Schools side was to be selected, and he was selected in the inter-state team representing Nundah. The team visited Perth and played a West Australian school team in March 1953 and Warden was Queensland vice-captain. He played for the Queensland Schools side again in 1954 as captain. After school he went on to represent Queensland at first-class level.

== See also ==
- List of Queensland first-class cricketers
