= Ted Trim =

Australian rules footballer, born 1907

Personal information
- Full name: Edward Seymour Trim
- Born: 6 November 1907; Seymour, Victoria
- Died: 22 April 1989 (aged 81)
- Original team: Prahran
- Height: 185 cm (6 ft 1 in)
- Weight: 83 kg (183 lb)

Playing career^{1}
Years	Club	Games (Goals)
1934–35	Footscray	17 (17)
- ^{1} Playing statistics correct to the end of 1935.

Edward Seymour Trim (6 November 1907 – 22 April 1989) was an Australian rules footballer who played with Footscray in the Victorian Football League (VFL).
