= Tawfiq Yusuf 'Awwad =

Lebanese writer and diplomat

- Born: 28 November 1911; Bharsaf village, Matn District, Lebanon
- Died: 16 April 1989 (aged 77); Al Hadeth, Lebanon
- Cause of death: Victim of the Lebanese Civil War
- Spouse: Ortans Bechara Khadige

Tawfiq Yusuf 'Awwad (Arabic: توفيق يوسف عواد; 28 November 1911 – 16 April 1989) was a Lebanese writer and diplomat. His 1939 novel Al-Raghif, inspired by Arab resistance to the Turks in World War I, "was quickly recognized as a landmark in the literary expression of Arab nationalism". His only other novel, Death In Beirut, was similarly well-regarded. 'Awwad also wrote poetry, essays, and plays. He was killed in a bombing in 1989 during the Lebanese Civil War.

== Early life ==
'Awwad was born in Bharsaf, a village in Matn District, the second of seven children. His father worked as a real estate expert and building contractor, and his mother was born into a conservative village. 'Awwad's early life and childhood was heavily affected by World War I, which began when he was around three years old. The 1916 famine in Mount Lebanon forced Tawfiq and his family to leave their hometown and move to Zahle, where his father opened a small restaurant. However, an outbreak of fever in Zahle forced the family to return to Bharsaf. He was educated in Bikfayya before attending the Jesuit College of St Joseph in Beirut from 1923 to 1927, where he received his bachelor's degree.

His hobbies included reading Arabic and French literature. His passion for literature encouraged him to take part in plays that were put on at the end of every scholastic year. During his free time, he would create impressions of inanimate objects that surrounded him, which later inspired and became the basis of one of his novels, al-Raghif (The Loaf). At age 15, he began writing poems in al-‘Arīs newspaper.

He was heavily influenced by the stories read to him by his grandmother in the book One Thousand and One Nights (Arabic: ألف ليلة وليلة). He was also inspired by French novelists and Arab writers and poets such as Abū al-Faraj al-Iṣbahānī (ابو الفرج الاصفهاني), Al- Mutanabi and Al-Jahiz.

== Career ==
=== Literary career ===
After completing his studies he became a journalist, editor, and short story writer. His writing appeared in several newspapers, including al-Bayān (Arabic: البيان) and Al Nida’ (Arabic: النداء). He then traveled to Damascus where he was employed as a reporter for al-Bayraq (Arabic: البيرق) and the nationalist newspaper Al Qabas (Arabic: القبس), where he served as editorial secretary. While in Damascus, he married the daughter of a Lebanese merchant and qualified as a lawyer before returning to Beirut in 1933. He did not practice law, however, instead working as editorial secretary of the new daily newspaper al-Nahar, and writing stories and articles about literature, politics, and social issues. In 1941, after a month in prison as a result of his nationalist activities, 'Awwad founded al-Jadid, a weekly newspaper that soon became a daily, which was published until 1946.

'Awwad worked in several literary forms, including novels, poetry, and short stories. Stories such as "Al Saaeh w Al Torjoman" and "Hasad al Oomor" contain poetic elements; for example, the latter story included 21 verses inspired by personal experiences. His short-story collection Kawafel al Zaman were dedicated to his life-long friend. He described this book as a "life-time summary from the bottom of his heart" that included his purest, rawest thoughts.

His first novel, al-Raghif (Arabic: The Loaf) takes place in the Levant during World War I. At the time, the area, which includes modern-day Syria and Lebanon, was roiled by popular uprisings against the Ottoman Empire. In the book, Awwad writes that "Arabs are still striving for a loaf of bread," implying that imperialism still holds power over Arab countries and that Arabs are still striving for freedom and independence. Al-Raghif is regarded as one of the greatest Arabic novels of the 20th century. However, some have criticized it for including details that are irrelevant to the narrative, and for disrupting the flow of the narrative when he tries to explain what is happening.

'Awwad wrote his second novel, Death in Beirut, more than 30 years after al-Raghif. The story takes place in Lebanon after the Arab-Israeli war of 1967. It follows the heroine, Tamima Nassour, a Shia Muslim teenage girl who leaves her village of Mahdiyya in southern Lebanon to enroll in university in Beirut. She becomes politically engaged while at university, is seduced by a rebellious writer, and falls in love with a Maronite Christian student named Hani Raai. Meanwhile, her ne'er-do-well brother Jaber Nessour squanders the family's money, tries to prevent Tamima from attending university, and even attempts to murder her. At the book's climax, Hani rejects her when he learns of her past. The book finishes with Tamima deciding to join the fedayeen, Palestinian guerrilla fighters. The author uses Tamima's story to show the challenges and cultural changes faced by Lebanese youth in the aftermath of the war and amid the Israeli raids on the fedayeen. The novel also focuses on gender relations in Lebanon and the restrictions and violence that women often faced.

'Awwad's sole play, The Tourist and the Guide, is an intellectual drama about mankind and gods. The play addresses philosophical problems faced by humans that may cause the gods distress. The characters include the Tourist, who traveled across the world to visit the ruins of Baalbek; the Sculptor; and a man who symbolizes the people of the future. The play is divided into three sections: arrival, visit and return. The dialogue, although full of discussion of ideas, is dramatized by bursts of imagery and poetry.

=== Diplomatic career ===
In 1946, 'Awwad was invited to join the Lebanese diplomatic service. After working for two years in Argentina as the Lebanese ambassador, he traveled to Iran to serve as ambassador there. He then moved to Madrid, Spain, where he remained for three years. 'Awwad next worked as ambassador in Cairo during the Suez Crisis. His stay in Egypt ended in 1959. After that, he went to Mexico and stayed for one year. His final posting was as ambassador to Italy. He retired from the diplomatic service in 1975, choosing to return to his hometown, Bharsaf, where he worked as the director of social and cultural affairs for around six years.

== Later life ==
'Awwad returned to Lebanon after retiring from the diplomatic service in 1975. The following year, his manuscripts and correspondence were ruined when his Beirut flat was bombed as part of the Lebanese Civil War. During this time period, 'Awwad wrote his autobiography in a collection of stories called "Husad al Aomor". In 1984, Tawfiq decided to stop writing. The frequent bombing incidents prompted him to hide in the Spanish embassy in Lebanon, knowing that his son-in-law was the Spanish ambassador in Lebanon. 'Awwad was killed on April 17, 1989, along with the Spanish ambassador to Lebanon and 15 other people, when a rocket targeted the Spanish embassy in the Beirut suburb of Al Hadeth.

== Works ==
=== Short story collections ===
- al-Sabi al a'raj (The Limping Boy), 1936
- Qamis al-suf (The Woollen Shirt), 1937
- al-'Adhara (The Virgins), 1944
- Matar al-Saki (Frosty Airport), 1982

=== Novels ===
- al-Raghif (The Loaf), 1939.
- Tawahin Beirut, 1972. Translated as Death in Beirut, 1976.

=== Plays ===
- The Tourist and The Guide
