= Ruth B. Weg =

Ruth Weg
- Born: Ruth Leah Weg; October 12, 1920; Manhattan, New York, U.S.
- Died: October 25, 2002 (aged 82); Los Angeles, California, U.S.
- Children: 3

Academic background
- Education: Hunter College (BS); University of Southern California (MS, PhD)

Academic work
- Discipline: Biology
- Sub-discipline: Gerontology; Biochemistry
- Institutions: USC Davis School of Gerontology

Ruth Leah Weg (October 12, 1920 – October 25, 2002) was an American academic who worked as a professor at the USC Davis School of Gerontology.

== Early life and education ==
A child of European immigrants, Weg grew up in the Manhattan borough of New York City. She graduated from Hunter College with a degree in biology. Instead of continuing on to medical school, she married her high school sweetheart and had two children, Robert and Andrea Bass.

After enrolling in a biology master's program at New York University, Weg’s husband accepted a job in Los Angeles, where she then enrolled in the University of Southern California and earned a secondary teaching credential. She then taught for two years but returned USC for a master's degree in biological sciences. In 1958, she received a Ph.D in biochemistry and biology from USC.

== Career ==
Upon her graduation from the Biology department, USC appointed her head of environmental research. In 1965, Weg married her second husband, Martin S. Weg, and gave birth to a daughter, Hanna Weg, at the age of 44. In 1970, she became an associate professor of gerontology, attaining a full professorship in 1984. She was one of several professors who did the initial planning for the Leonard Davis School of Gerontology at the University of Southern California (which opened in 1975). Weg helped develop the curriculum and was Dean of students for two years (1974–1976). Weg specialties included sexuality in the later years, appropriate nutrition, and promoting positive images of aging.

Weg retired at the age of 70.

== Awards ==
- Ruth B. Weg, Professor Emeritus of gerontology at the Leonard Davis School of Gerontology, was the first recipient of the USC Emeriti College Award for Distinguished Scholarly Service.

== Selected publications ==
- Weg, Ruth B. (1983). Sexuality in the later years : roles and behavior. New York, New York: Academic Press.
- Weg, Ruth B. (1978). Nutrition and the later years. Los Angeles: Ethel Percy Andrus Gerontology Center, University of Southern California.
- Weg, R. B., & Loucks, W. (1981). The aged: Who, where, how well. Mankato, Minn.: Mankato State University Gerontological Studies Program.
- Weg, R. B., Markson, E. W., & Association for Gerontology in Higher Education. (1997). The older woman. Washington, DC (1001 Connecticut Ave., NW, Suite 410, Washington 20036-5504: Association for Gerontology in Higher Education.
- Weg, R. B., & American Dietetic Association. (1992). Nutrition in the later years: A major player in health promotion and disease prevention. Palm Desert, CA: Convention Cassettes Unlimited.
- Weg, R. B. University of Southern California. (1974). Progress report: Multidisciplinary training program in gerontology. Los Angeles: The Center.
- Weg, R. B., & Markson, E. (1991). Older woman. Association for Gerontology in Higher Education, Washington, DC.
- Weg, R. B. (1979). Aged: who, where, how well. Leonard Davis School of Gerontology, Ethel Percy Andrus Gerontology Center, University of Southern California, Los Angeles, CA.
- Weg, R. B. (1989). Biology and physiology of development of aging. Gerontology And Geriatrics Education, 9(4), 9-16.
- Weg, R. B. (1980). Prolonged mild nutritional deficiencies: significance for health maintenance. Journal of Nutrition for the Elderly, 1(1), 3-22.
