= Henry G. Parks Jr. =

American businessman (1916–1989)

- Born: September 29, 1916; Atlanta, Georgia, US
- Died: April 24, 1989 (aged 72); Towson, Maryland, US
- Education: Ohio State University
- Occupations: Businessman, politician
- Known for: Founder of the Parks Sausages Company

Henry G. Parks Jr. (September 29, 1916 – April 24, 1989) was an American businessman and politician based in Baltimore. He was the founder of Parks Sausages Company, one of the first publicly traded Black-owned businesses and the first ever to be listed on the New York Stock Exchange. Parks held various elected and appointed public offices, including serving six years on the Baltimore City Council.

== Life and career ==
Parks was born on September 29, 1916, in Atlanta, Georgia. As a child his family moved to Dayton, Ohio. He received a bachelor's degree in business from Ohio State University in 1939.

After graduation, Parks worked, as a sales representative for the Pabst Brewing Company. He left Pabst in 1942 to become a partner in W. B. Graham and Associates, a New York City public relations agency. While working at the agency, he attempted to launch various enterprises, such as Joe Louis Punch, a beverage named after the heavyweight boxing champion. In 1949, Parks left W. B. Graham and bought into Crayton's Southern Sausage Company of Cleveland, Ohio. After a failed attempt to sell the idea of producing sausage marketed to a southern taste, he sold his interests in Crayton's and went into debt.

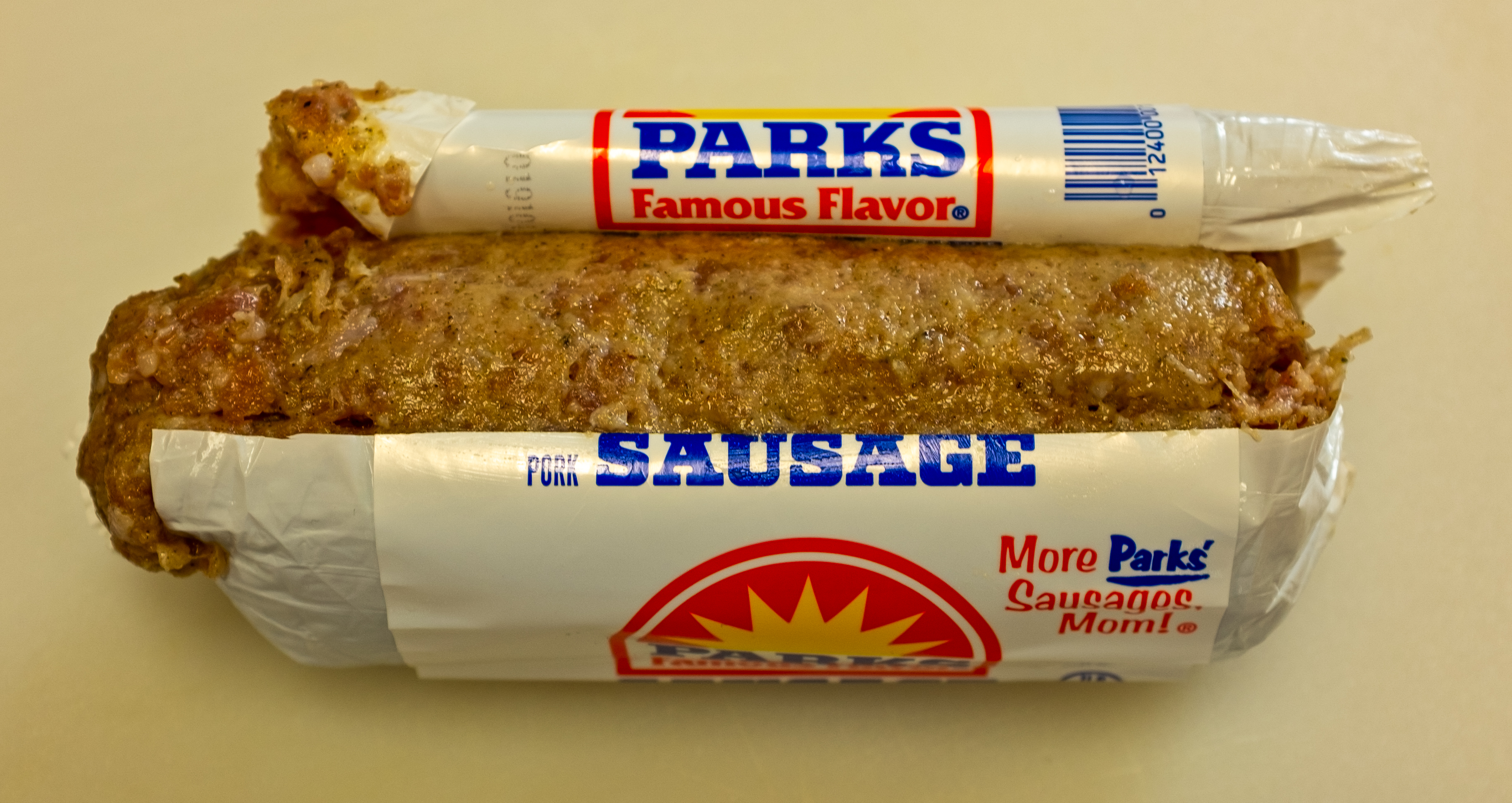
Chub (opened) of Parks Breakfast Sausage

Parks used old recipes he had learned to found the Parks Sausage Company in 1951. He started the company with the help of two employees from a former dairy in Baltimore. Parks built the company into a multi-million dollar enterprise with some 300 employees, a modern processing plant, and sales of more than $14 million a year. In 1969, the Parks Sausage Company became one of the first black-owned businesses to obtain working capital by selling its stock to the general public. It was also the first Black-owned business listed on the New York Stock Exchange. In 1977, Parks sold his interest in the Parks Sausage Company, but he remained as a consultant and director of the company until his death.

Parks was dedicated to helping the black community, by "encouraging the employment of talented young black people." He served on the Baltimore City Council from 1963 through 1969, advocating for laws opening public accommodations to African Americans and easing bail requirements for people accused of crimes. He served on the boards of Magnavox, W. R. Grace, the First Pennsylvania Bank, and other companies, as well as the Opportunities Industrial Center Inc. and the National Interracial Council for Business Opportunity. He was a supporter of the United Negro College Fund, the National Urban League, and the NAACP.

Parks died of complications from Parkinson's disease on April 24, 1989, at the Meridian Multi-Medical Nursing Center in Towson, Maryland. He was survived by two daughters, Grace and Cheryl; a sister, Vera Wilson, and three grandchildren.

== Legacy ==
Parks granddaughter, Rosalie Johnson, founded the Henry G. Parks Foundation.
