= Behind the Attic Wall =

1983 novel by Sylvia Cassedy

- Author: Sylvia Cassedy
- Language: English
- Genre: Children's; Ghost story; Supernatural
- Publisher: HarperCollins, Avon Camelot
- Publication date: October 5, 1983
- Publication place: United States
- Media type: Print
- Pages: 315
- ISBN: 0-380-69843-9
- Dewey Decimal: 813.54

Behind the Attic Wall is a children's novel by Sylvia Cassedy, first published in 1983.

== Synopsis ==
At twelve, Maggie has already been thrown out of numerous foster homes and boarding schools for lying, stealing, and disobedience. At last she comes to Adelphi Hills—a former boarding school that ceased functioning after the death of its founders—to live with her only living relatives: Great-Aunts Lillian and Harriet and her eccentric but kind uncle Morris.

Upon arriving, Maggie is unsurprised to learn that her great-aunts are strict, stern, and do not really care about her; they plan to use their rigid rules regarding nutrition and exercise to rehabilitate Maggie as an example of healthful living. By the end of her first day, Maggie is already in disgrace for refusing to eat her meals and rummaging through the aunts' rooms, which they mistake for stealing. Maggie spends much of her time alone in Adelphi Hills, playing imaginary games and exploring the many empty rooms. The only person who makes an effort to connect with her is Uncle Morris, who, while funny and playful, often frustrates Maggie with his cryptic answers. Maggie attends the New Adelphi Hills school, where she alienates her classmates with her sullenness and strangeness.

One day while exploring the house, Maggie hears voices having a conversation but cannot locate the speakers. This begins to happen frequently, and soon she is convinced that the voices are speaking about her. Finally she hears them calling her by name and eventually traces them to a secret room behind the attic wall, where two large dolls—Timothy John and Miss Christabel—live in a makeshift home with their small china dog. The dolls, who can move as well as speak, greet Maggie as their new caretaker. Confused, frightened, and angry, Maggie rejects the dolls, overturning their kitchen table and scattering them. Later that night, Maggie feels guilty for injuring the dolls and returns the next day to repair them, beginning a relationship. Maggie is expected to join the dolls for tea, then accompany them to the portion of flowered wallpaper they call their rose garden. As she learns to accept the dolls' love, she improves both physically and emotionally, eventually even befriending girls at her school.

Maggie is curious that the dolls always seem to believe it is the same hour of the same day, and that they cannot remember how they came to be in the attic. Her curiosity grows when she finds a trunk of doll clothes that have been partially charred. At the same time, Miss Christabel gives Maggie her embroidered handkerchief. Maggie goes on a walk with Uncle Morris, who shows her the site of the school's former barn, telling her that it burned down in a fire that killed the school's founders, whose portraits hang in the school's parlor.

The great-aunts have chosen to throw a party to show Maggie's improvement to their health and nutrition society. Maggie is given a beautiful dress, which inspires her to throw a party for the dolls in the attic on the same day. At the attic party, Maggie provides a cupcake with a lighted candle. The dolls panic at the sight of fire, and their noise summons the aunts. The dolls fall over lifeless when they are seen by other people, and the great-aunts, believing that Maggie attempted to burn down the house, decide that they cannot keep her any longer. In the process of Maggie being sent away, Uncle Morris dies, and Maggie is allowed to remain until his funeral. Maggie recognizes the handkerchief Miss Christabel gave her as the same one in the founders' portrait.

On her final day, Maggie decides to return to the attic one last time, where she arranges the dolls in the semblance of a final tea party. Before she can leave, the dolls return to life, telling her that a third guest is coming to live with them once Maggie is gone. Maggie recognizes a doll-sized version of Uncle Morris's hat and walking stick, but before she can fully process what this means, she leaves Adelphi Hills for good.

A year later, still haunted by the memory of Adelphi Hills, the lessons she learned there allow Maggie to successfully bond with her new foster family.
