= Marcel Schumann =

Luxembourgish footballer

Personal information
- Date of birth: 15 January 1901
- Place of birth: Luxembourg, Luxembourg
- Date of death: 23 April 1989 (aged 88)
- Place of death: Luxembourg, Luxembourg

International career
| Years | Team | Apps | (Gls) |
- Luxembourg

Marcel Schumann (15 January 1901 – 23 April 1989) was a Luxembourgish footballer. He competed in the men's tournament at the 1924 Summer Olympics.
