= Fred Godfrey (footballer) =

Australian rules footballer, born 1910

Personal information
- Full name: John Frederick George Godfrey
- Born: 19 November 1910; Bristol, England
- Died: 24 April 1989 (aged 78)
- Original team: Yallourn
- Height: 183 cm (6 ft 0 in)
- Weight: 85 kg (187 lb)

Playing career^{1}
Years	Club	Games (Goals)
1938	Footscray	6 (5)
- ^{1} Playing statistics correct to the end of 1938.

John Frederick George Godfrey (19 November 1910 – 24 April 1989) was an Australian rules footballer who played with Footscray in the Victorian Football League (VFL).
