= Kenneth Harrison (serial killer) =

American serial killer (1938–1989)

- Born: Kenneth Francis Harrison; September 4, 1938; Boston, Massachusetts, U.S.
- Died: April 20, 1989 (aged 50); St. Luke's Hospital, Middleborough, Massachusetts, U.S.
- Other name: "The Giggler"
- Convictions: First degree murder Second degree murder (3 counts)
- Penalty: Life imprisonment without parole

Details
- Victims: 4
- Span of crimes: 1967–1969
- Country: United States
- State: Massachusetts
- Date apprehended: January 7, 1970

Kenneth Francis Harrison (September 4, 1938 – April 20, 1989), known as The Giggler, was an American serial killer who killed four people in Boston, Massachusetts, from 1967 to 1969, for which he was sentenced to life imprisonment. He earned his nickname from calling the authorities after each killing, professing it was the killer speaking and uncontrollably giggling before hanging up. Harrison died in hospital in 1989, following a suicide attempt by overdosing on medication.

== Early life ==
Kenneth Francis Harrison was born on September 4, 1938, in the Mission Hill neighborhood of Boston, one of two children of Earl Harrison and his Polish-born wife Veronica (née Zemotel). Little is known about his personal life, but after finishing the eighth grade, Harrison became an unemployed itinerant cook who lived in various rooming houses around the South End, and sometimes inside South Station.

== Murders ==
On April 15, 1967, 6-year-old Lucy Palmarin, originally from Puerto Rico, was sent by her parents to turn in a tonic bottle in a public housing project in Boston. When she failed to return home for dinner, her disappearance was reported to the authorities, who launched an all-out search for Palmarin. They questioned numerous neighbors, searched various abandoned buildings and isolated areas, but were initially unable to find her. According to a playmate of Palmarin, she was last seen climbing into a black Sedan driven by an unfamiliar man – this greatly alarmed her family, as Palmarin did not speak English and was not very well acquainted with anyone in the area.

On May 24, two teenagers walking towards Broadway station noticed something wedged between some rubbish thrown into the Fort Point Channel, and upon closer inspection, they realized that it was the body of a little girl. Her death was listed as drowning, but at the time, it was presumed to have been accidental. The finding was quickly reported to the authorities, who recovered it and brought it to local mortuary, where it was positively identified as that of Lucy Palmarin by one of her brothers. Upon hearing of the discovery, Palmarin's mother fainted and had to be driven to a hospital for treatment.

On June 16, 1969, 31-year-old Joseph "Joe" Breen, a Marine Corps veteran who worked at the water department in Brookline, went to the Novelty Bar in the Combat Zone to drink with some friends. After drinking with them for some time, Breen decided to play shuffleboard with another customer – Harrison. The two played until closing time, whereupon they left the bar together. Sometime later, the pair got into a brawl over the cost of a bottle of liquor and the cab fare, whereupon Harrison pushed Breen into a waterfilled pit and beat him on the head with rocks. He then went to the nearest phone and called the police, informing them about the body's location. Harrison then said that it was "The Giggler" who was speaking, promptly began to giggle, and then hung up. Breen's body was found on the following day at the described location.

Breen's death was ruled a homicide, and after interviewing the two friends who had accompanied him, police were provided with a description of the man they had seen with Breen – a pudgy man in his early 30s, of average height and wearing old clothes. After some time had passed, one of the two friends who kept visiting the Novelty Bar spotted Harrison and immediately reported the sighting to the police, but by the time they arrived, he had already left. Since they were unable to learn his name, Harrison managed to avoid arrest.

On November 27, the body of 75-year-old Clovis Parker, an elderly woman who lived in the South End, was also found floating in the Fort Point Channel. She was identified via her identity papers, which were still on her body, and despite the similarities with Palmarin's death two years prior, her death was also ruled accidental.

On December 26, 9-year-old Kenneth "Kenny" Martin left his home in Dorchester and went in the direction of South Station, where he planned to catch a train and go to his friend's house. When he got to the platform, he was approached by Harrison, who convinced him to play around with him instead and then accompany him to his living space inside the station. Upon entering a tunnel under South Station, Harrison strangled Martin with a piece of twine and then covered the body with a canvas, which he left in the tunnel. Martin's body was found ten days later by a detective searching through the station, and he was positively identified by a friend of his.

== Arrest, investigation and trial ==
Unbeknownst to Harrison, multiple witnesses had seen him accompanying the boy on the day of his disappearance, which was later relayed to the authorities. A warrant was issued for his arrest, and after receiving an anonymous tip, police officers traced Harrison to the Biltmore Hotel in Providence, Rhode Island, where he was arrested on the following day. Harrison offered no resistance and waived extradition to Boston, where he was soon charged with Martin's murder. A few days later, he was arraigned on additional murder charges for the deaths of Palmarin, Parker and Breen.

During the trial for Martin's murder, it was revealed that the phone tip that lead to his arrest was made by his sister, Eileen Longo. She testified that Harrison had called on two occasions prior to his arrest and confessed to killing the boy, and had even told her where he had hidden the body. After consulting with a lawyer, she decided to call the police and told them what had happened. In response, Harrison's attorney argued that while his client did admit to playing around with the boy at the escalators at South Station, he did not explicitly state being responsible for his murder. Furthermore, he argued that if he was indeed guilty, then the crime was not committed intentionally, arguing that Harrison had either been drunk or had suffered a blackout. Harrison himself claimed that there was not enough evidence to convict him, but that if he was found guilty, then he should be given the death penalty.

In spite of his pleas and claims that another unnamed individual had participated in the crime, Harrison was found guilty of Martin's murder and sentenced to life imprisonment. From there, he was transferred to serve his sentence at MCI-Walpole, where he would await trial for the three other murders. In June 1972, Harrison pleaded guilty to the remaining murders, explaining how he had carried them out in detail. At said trial, his attorney requested that he be allowed to serve his sentences at the Bridgewater State Hospital, but this was denied by the presiding judge, who said that this decision was beyond the court's jurisdiction.

== Imprisonment and suicide ==
After spending only six days at MCI-Walpole, Harrison was transferred to the Bridgewater State Hospital for treatment, where he remained for more than a decade. Sometime in early 1989, he was informed by staff members that he was due to a transfer to MCI-Concord, after which Harrison supposedly spiraled into a depression. Despite this, he was left largely unmonitored.

On April 20, 1989, Harrison was found slumped on the floor of his room by staff members and quickly transported to St. Luke's Hospital in Middleborough, where he subsequently died. An autopsy confirmed that he had deliberately taken an overdose of Elavil, an antidepressant which he had been prescribed. The hospital received heavy criticism for its handling of the case and for previous suicides that taken place there since 1987, but the hospital's labor union later released a statement claiming that a high-ranking official without medical training had ordered them to lessen the surveillance on Harrison. This claim was denied by Wesley Profit, Bridgerwater's chief clinical psychologist, who claimed that he had personally made the decision not to place him on suicide watch. According to him, Harrison's suicide attempt was not the result of his depression, but an attempt to embarrass hospital staff that gone awry.

== See also ==
- List of serial killers in the United States

== Bibliography ==
- Christopher Daley (August 21, 2015). Murder & Mayhem in Boston: Historic Crimes in the Hub. Arcadia Publishing. ISBN 978-1625853066.
