= Frances Steloff =

American bookstore owner (1887–1989)

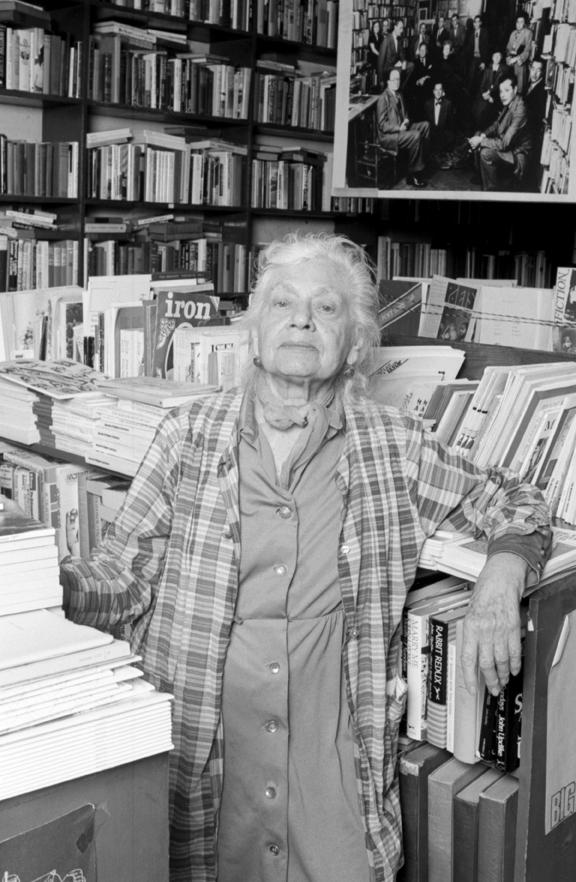
Frances Steloff photographed by Lynn Gilbert (1978)

Ida Frances Stelov (December 31, 1887 – April 15, 1989), better known as Fanny Steloff, was the founder of the Gotham Book Mart in New York City, a center for avant-garde literature and literati from 1920 until it closed in 2007.

Ida Frances Stelov was born to a poor family in Saratoga Springs, New York on December 31, 1887. Her mother died when she was young, and at 12 she was taken in by a couple who offered her a home. She dropped out of school in the seventh grade. At the age of 19, she moved to New York where she worked at Loeser's, a department store. She then worked in several bookstores, and in 1920 founded the Gotham Book Mart.

She challenged government censorship, ordering smuggled copies of Henry Miller's Tropic of Cancer in the 1930s and purchasing shipments of D. H. Lawrence's banned book Lady Chatterley's Lover in the late 1920s. She founded the James Joyce Society at the store in 1947.

According to its writer Robbie Robertson, the line "Take a load off, Fanny" in his well known song "The Weight" was inspired by Steloff, whose bookstore he visited.

Steloff married David Moss in 1923. They divorced in 1930.

== See also ==
- Frances Steloff: Memoirs of a Bookseller
