= Bob McGann =

Australian rules footballer, born 1905

Personal information
- Full name: Robert Joseph McGann
- Born: 8 September 1905; Chiltern, Victoria
- Died: 20 April 1989 (aged 83)

Playing career^{1}
Years	Club	Games (Goals)
1928	Footscray	5 (0)
1929–30	Preston (VFA)	24 (0)
- ^{1} Playing statistics correct to the end of 1930.

Robert Joseph McGann (8 September 1905 – 20 April 1989) was an Australian rules footballer who played with Footscray in the Victorian Football League (VFL).
