= James Wilson (Australian rules footballer) =

Australian rules footballer

James Wilson (1856 – 16 November 1935) was an Australian rules footballer who played with Geelong in the Victorian Football Association (VFA), captaining the side for a few seasons during the 1870s and 1880s. This was an era when the club won a number of premierships prior to the inception of the Victorian Football League (VFL).

Before taking up football, "Young Jim Wilson" was a jockey who rode in the Melbourne Cup, and later a successful trainer, most notably of the 1899 Melbourne Cup winner Merriwee.

== History ==
Wilson was a son of James "Old Jim" Wilson (26 December 1828 – November 1917), a Victorian racehorse trainer, founder of the historic St Albans Stud in Geelong, and trainer of the 1873 Melbourne Cup winner Don Juan and the 1876 winner Brisei. "Old Jim" Wilson and Adam Lindsay Gordon were great friends, but in the saddle serious rivals in cross-country races in the Western Districts of Victoria. When Gordon gave up racing he gave his last saddle to young Wilson.

Wilson's first appearance as a jockey was New Year's Day 1869, when, weighing 4 stone (25 kg) and dubbed "Young Jim" Wilson, he rode at Flemington. He soon became well known, but was not of a slim build like his brother William (c. 1859 – 3 May 1890), who rode Don Juan to victory in the 1873 Cup, and turned to Australian rules football, playing for Geelong, which he captained in 1878 and 1879. Geelong was one of the six clubs which in 1897 broke away from in the Victorian Football Association (VFA) to found the more professional Victorian Football League (VFL). He was also a good cricketer, champion boxer and billiard player.

After seeing the successes of his sons, "Old Jim" Wilson purchased "Frankfurt" estate for his sons as a racetrack. He then helped Wilson purchase the adjoining "Kingston estate" and "Bonny Vale" at Queenscliff.

Wilson achieved considerable success as a trainer of thoroughbred horses. Notable wins included:

- Australian Cup: Pendil (1909)
- AJC Metropolitan Handicap: Sir Andrew (1923)
- Oakleigh Plate: Perspective (1926)
- AJC St Leger: Sir Andrew (1923) Brimming and Monodia
- VRC St Leger: Silver King (1885); Danaus (1911); Nautical (1921)

For Herbert Power (prominent owner for whom the Herbert Power Stakes was named):

- Sydney Cup: Diffidence (1899)
- Melbourne Cup: Merriwee (1899)
- VRC Oaks: Wilari (1911)
- VRC St Leger: Wilari (1912)
- Victoria Derby: Merriwee (1899), Wilari (1911)

His own horses included:

- Ascot Vale Stakes: Newhaven (1896)
- Australian Cup: The Rover (1921), part owner
- Caulfield Guineas: Ringmaster (1885); and Danaus (1910)
- Caulfield Futurity Stakes: Palmer (1900)
- AJC Champagne Stakes: Outlook (1918))
- Debutant Stakes: Scotland
- Maribyrnong Plate: Newhaven (1895); and Philio (1910)
- AJC Metropolitan Handicap: Sir Andrew (1923)
- Oakleigh Plate: Perspective (1926); later sold to S. P. Mackay for 2,000 guineas.
- AJC St Leger: Sir Andrew
- VRC St Leger: Silver King (1885); Danaus (1911); and Nautical (1921)
- AJC Sires Produce Stakes: Outlook (1918). He was then sold to S. P. Mackay for 5,000 guineas.
- Toorak Handicap: King's Bounty (1917)
- Victoria Derby: Newhaven (1896), later won 1896 Melbourne Cup trained by W. S. Hickenbotham and sent to England.

Other good horses were The Quiver, Practical, and Brimming. Bobadil was a successful sire for the stud.

A long-time jockey for both Wilsons was Chris Moore (c. 1864 – 3 September 1934), who was disqualified for a year after failing to start on Quiver at the Oaks Stakes (1894). Other jockeys for the Bonny Vale stables were James E. Pike, Dempsey, W. Duncan, R. Lewis, A Wilson and A. Fullarton.

Strong of build and will like his father, Wilson was reticent, shunned publicity, and formed few friendships. He was not one to start a fight, but if provoked would not step back, and could use his fists to good effect. Like his father he could be abrupt and overbearing but on the right occasion could be relaxed and entertaining. He was declared insolvent in 1934 as a result of the Great Depression and "Bonny Vale" was sold. He died in a private hospital after some months of poor health. His remains were buried in a private ceremony at the Point Lonsdale Cemetery.

== Family ==
- James Wilson, Jr. (c. 1856 – 16 November 1935) married Jessie Cunningham, daughter of George Cunningham previously MLA for South Grant, on 10 December 1884. They had a home "Bonny Vale" in Ocean Grove
