= Jock McConchie =

Australian rules footballer, born 1910

Personal information
- Full name: David John McConchie
- Born: 30 May 1910
- Died: 26 April 1998 (aged 87)
- Original team: St Stephen's (Richmond) / Sandringham
- Height: 175 cm (5 ft 9 in)
- Weight: 68 kg (150 lb)

Playing career^{1}
Years	Club	Games (Goals)
1932–34	Richmond	16 (9)
1936–37	Fitzroy	22 (45)
Total		38 (54)
- ^{1} Playing statistics correct to the end of 1937.

David John 'Jock' McConchie (30 May 1910 – 26 April 1998) was an Australian rules footballer who played with Richmond and Fitzroy in the Victorian Football League (VFL).
