= Les Jones (footballer, born April 1910) =

Australian rules footballer (1910–1989)

Personal information
- Full name: Leslie Richard Joseph Jones
- Born: 10 April 1910; Dunolly, Victoria
- Died: 3 April 1989 (aged 78)
- Height: 180 cm (5 ft 11 in)
- Weight: 83 kg (183 lb)

Playing career^{1}
| Years | Club | Games (Goals) |
| 1932 | St Kilda | 3 (0) |
- ^{1} Playing statistics correct to the end of 1932.

Leslie Richard Joseph Jones (10 April 1910 – 3 April 1989) was an Australian rules footballer who played with St Kilda in the Victorian Football League (VFL). He debuted in AFL at the age of 22.
