= Bill Munn =

Australian rules footballer (1911–1989)

Personal information
- Full name: Wilfred Thomas John Munn
- Born: 18 July 1911; Richmond, Victoria
- Died: 2 April 1989 (aged 77); Cowes, Victoria
- Original team: Canterbury
- Height: 171 cm (5 ft 7 in)
- Weight: 75 kg (165 lb)

Playing career^{1}
Years	Club	Games (Goals)
1932–33	Collingwood	9 (1)
- ^{1} Playing statistics correct to the end of 1933.

Wilfred Thomas John Munn (18 July 1911 – 2 April 1989) was an Australian rules footballer who played with Collingwood in the Victorian Football League (VFL).
