= List of places of worship in Central Goldfields Shire =

This is a list of places of worship in the Shire of Central Goldfields, a local government area in the state of Victoria, Australia. The list includes active and former churches and other religious buildings representing a variety of Christian denominations and other faiths.

St Michael and all Angels Anglican Church, Talbot

== Heritage listing status ==
Style	Status
Yes	Listed on the Victorian Heritage Register
–	Not listed

== Current places of worship ==
Current places of worship
Name	Image	Location	Denomination/ Affiliation	Heritage listing	Notes	Refs
Maryborough Church of Christ		Maryborough; 37.047526°S 143.734787°E	Church of Christ			
St Michael and all Angels Anglican Church		Talbot; 37.169642°S 143.699999°E	Anglican			
Genesis Church		Maryborough; 37.044971°S 143.735722°E	Pentecostal (Australian Christian Churches)			
Christ the King Anglican Church		Maryborough; 37.043470°S 143.738581°E	Anglican			
St Augustine's Catholic Church		Maryborough; 37.052115°S 143.736106°E	Catholic			
St Andrew's Uniting Church (Maryborough Uniting Church)		Maryborough; 37.044624°S 143.736231°E	Uniting (formerly Presbyterian)			
Maryborough Seventh-day Adventist Church		Maryborough; 37.044758°S 143.733179°E	Seventh-day Adventist			
Bucknall Memorial Church		Majorca; 37.102119°S 143.860914°E	Swedenborgian			
St John's Anglican Church, Dunolly		Dunolly; 36.860006°S 143.733813°E	Anglican			
St Mary's Catholic Church, Dunolly		Dunolly; 36.860745°S 143.736862°E	Catholic			
Dunolly District Uniting Church		Dunolly; 36.857062°S 143.731040°E	Uniting (formerly Methodist (Wesleyan)			
St Patrick's Catholic Church, Bealiba		Bealiba; 36.790690°S 143.545482°E	Catholic			
St David's Anglican Church, Bealiba		Bealiba; 36.789440°S 143.552112°E	Anglican			

== Former places of worship ==
Former places of worship
Name	Image	Location	Denomination/ Affiliation	Heritage listing	Notes	Refs
Talbot Wesleyan Methodist Church		Talbot; 37.170772°S 143.699520°E	Methodist (Wesleyan)			
Talbot Primitive Methodist Church		Talbot; 37.171238°S 143.699571°E	Methodist (Primitive)			
St Andrew's Presbyterian Church, Talbot		Talbot; 37.172119°S 143.700761°E	Presbyterian			
St Patrick's Catholic Church, Talbot		Talbot; 37.175776°S 143.706686°E	Catholic			
Jubilee Wesleyan Methodist Church		Maryborough; 37.047834°S 143.734376°E	Methodist (Wesleyan)			
Craigie Methodist Church		Craigie; 37.102962°S 143.775178°E	Methodist			
Majorca Wesleyan Methodist Church		Majorca; 37.115452°S 143.797616°E	Methodist (Wesleyan)			
Carisbrook Uniting Church		Carisbrook; 37.049733°S 143.815308°E	Uniting (formerly Methodist (Wesleyan))			
Scots Presbyterian Church, Carisbrook		Carisbrook; 37.045708°S 143.812773°E	Presbyterian			
St Francis Xavier's Catholic Church		Carisbrook; 37.045743°S 143.811811°E	Catholic			
St Paul's Anglican Church, Carisbrook		Carisbrook; 37.049315°S 143.813734°E	Anglican			
Dunolly Presbyterian Church		Dunolly; 36.861506°S 143.735309°E	Presbyterian			
Dunolly Church of Christ		Dunolly; 36.861289°S 143.733767°E	Church of Christ			
Dunolly Congregational Church		Dunolly; 36.856277°S 143.731987°E	Congregational			
St Andrew's Uniting Church, Bealiba		Bealiba; 36.788925°S 143.552370°E	Uniting (formerly Presbyterian)			
Bealiba Methodist Church		Bealiba; 36.788050°S 143.552459°E	Methodist			
Bet Bet & Betley Uniting Church		Betley; 36.909771°S 143.797657°E	Uniting (formerly Presbyterian)			
St Mary's Catholic Church, Timor		Timor; 36.984317°S 143.708682°E	Catholic			
Bet Bet Church of Christ		Bet Bet; 36.922427°S 143.756922°E	Church of Christ			
St Michael and All Angels Anglican Church, Moliagul		Moliagul; 36.748238°S 143.665402°E	Anglican			

== See also ==
- List of places of worship in Mount Alexander Shire
- List of places of worship in Hepburn Shire
- List of places of worship in Moorabool Shire
- List of places of worship in the City of Ballarat
- List of places of worship in the City of Greater Bendigo
