= Amherst, Victoria =

Amherst
- Town
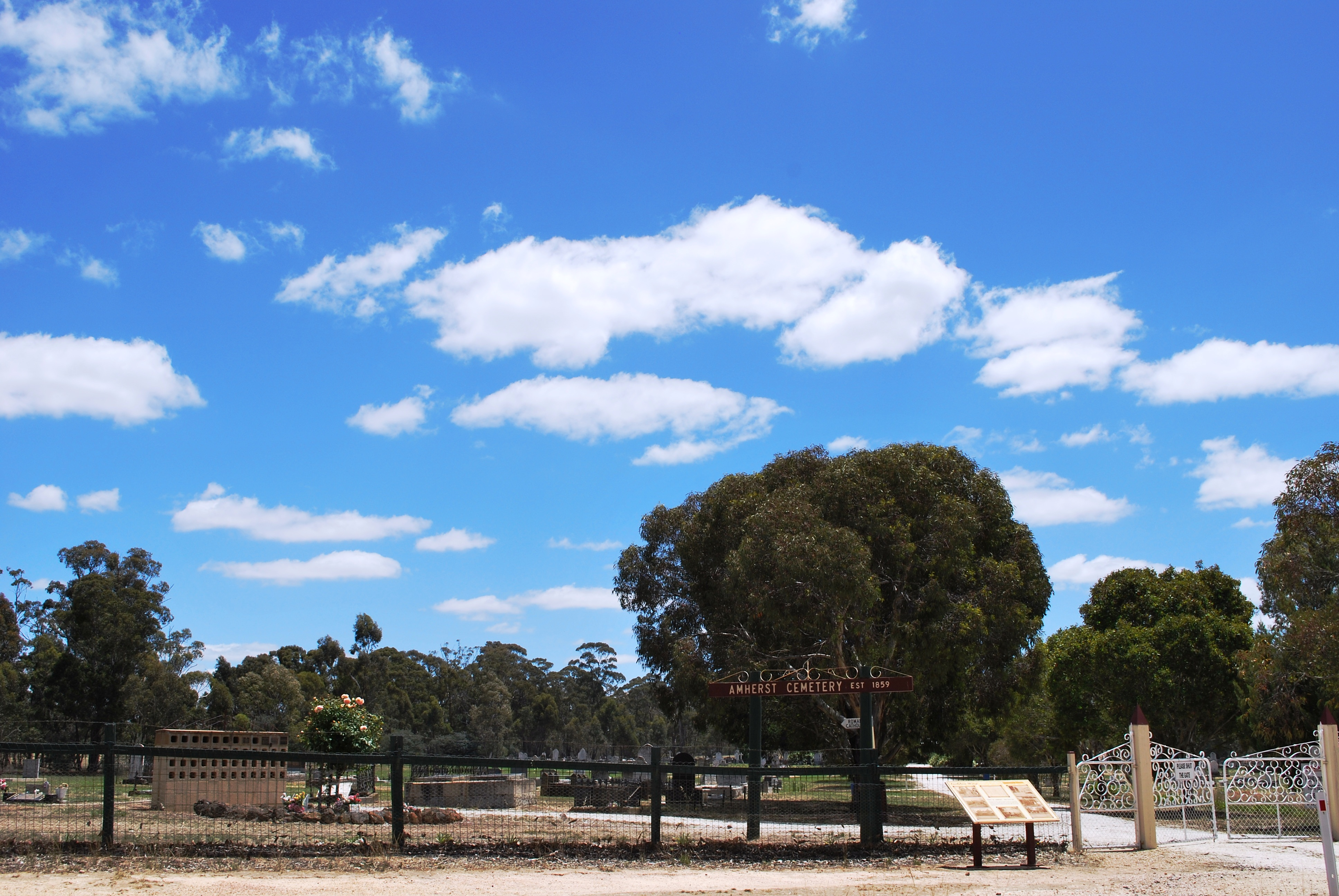
- Amherst Cemetery : 235 Avoca Road

- Coordinates: 37°08′43″S 143°40′07″E
- Country: Australia
- State: Victoria
- LGA: Shire of Central Goldfields
- Location: 173 km (107 mi) NW of Melbourne; 58 km (36 mi) N of Ballarat; 5 km (3.1 mi) W of Talbot
- Established: 1840s (settled); 1855 (surveyed); 1858 (established)

Government
  - State electorate: Ripon
  - Federal division: Mallee
- Elevation: 252 m (827 ft)

Population
  - Total: 63 (2021 census)
- Postcode: 3371

Amherst is a locality situated within the Shire of Central Goldfields in Victoria, Australia. Much of the original township has been destroyed by fire, and little remains other than Amherst Cemetery at 235 Avoca Road, Talbot.

== Geography ==
Amherst is located 5 kilometres (3.1 mi) west of Talbot and 173 kilometres (107 mi) north west of Melbourne. In its heyday, Amherst was situated in the middle of a gold belt 11 kilometres (6.8 mi) long and 1.5 kilometres (0.93 mi) wide.

Nowadays, the size of Amherst is approximately 33.7 square kilometres (13.0 mi^{2}). Four parks cover nearly 7% of this total area. The town mostly resembles an uneven paddock with little to show of its colourful and significant history.

Nevertheless, Amherst is surrounded by old gold workings, and there is State forest to the north. The Amherst vineyard was planted in 1989 on land 20 kilometres (12 mi) south east of Avoca. The Amherst Winery markets its 'Daisy Creek' red and white wine. Evidence of the gold diggings can be seen around the vineyard in the quartz rich soil.

== History ==
=== Early settlement ===
The town of Amherst originally began as a mining settlement referred to as Daisy Hill or occasionally Daisy Hill Creek, which extended through the village. The actual location of Daisy Hill is still not known as it is often confused with a land division nearby in the Paddy Ranges known as the Daisy Hill Block, which was an earlier squatter survey lease in the Pyrenees. Additionally, the Colonial Police Troopers were stationed in 1849 on the highway to Maryborough at a place widely referred to as Daisy Hill. Furthermore, newspapers of that era often loosely referred to Clunes Station, 10 miles (16 km) east as the "Pyrenees".

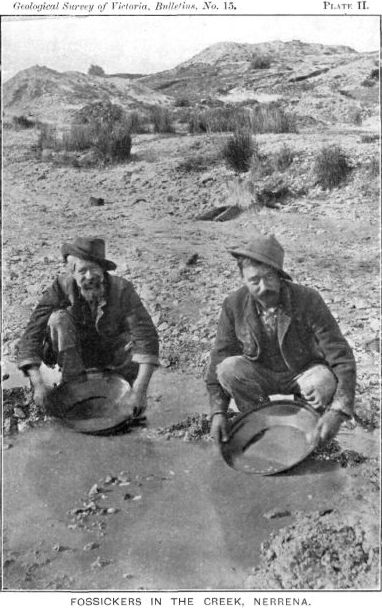
Picture of fossickers (for illustration purposes only)

=== Gold fever hype ===
The two main colonial towns of Geelong and Melbourne had experienced gold fever hype since the California Gold Rush began in 1848. Daisy Hill (Amherst) gained notoriety due to an illegitimate gold rush in 1849 when exiled shepherd and former Parkhurst prison inmate Thomas Chapman sold 38 ounces of gold to Collins Street, Melbourne jeweller Charles Bretani. This sparked a rush to the area. Chapman vanished soon after the sale, and uncertainty surrounds where the nugget was actually found, or whether it was stolen. The settlement of Daisy Hill (later named Amherst) is not to be confused with the contemporary town of Daisy Hill, Victoria. Amherst is now virtually deserted.

=== Victorian gold rush ===
In May 1852, a separate verifiable discovery of gold was made at Daisy Hill. During the Victorian gold rush era, the location quickly became known as an extremely lucrative diggings, and tens of thousands of miners rushed to the area. Between 1852 and 1855, gold was found at a number of locations.

=== Growth of Amherst ===
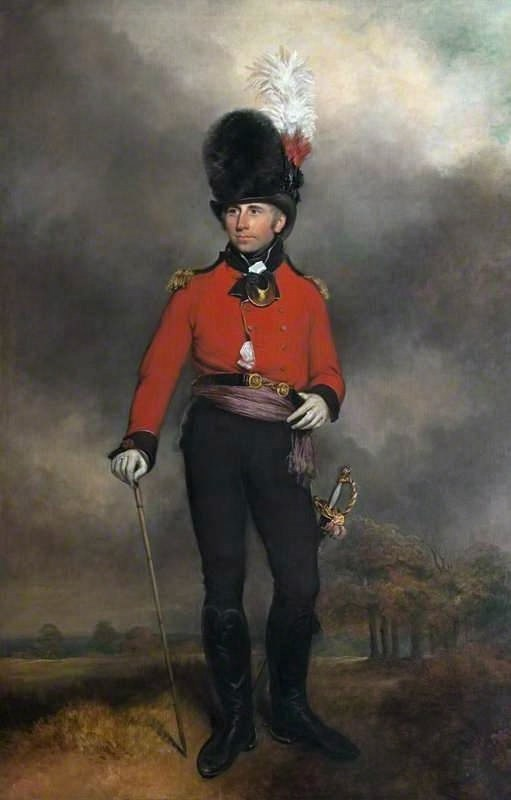
Lord William Pitt Amherst

In 1855, the area was surveyed and the village name was changed from Daisy Hill to Amherst, probably to commemorate Lord Amherst (1773-1857). Town lots were sold. In January 1856, a post office opened. Later in 1856, a Church of England school started. By 1857, there was also a Wesleyan (Methodist) church.

On 22 October 1858, Amherst became a borough, which included the town of Talbot (formerly known as Back Creek, where miners rioted against Chinese prospectors three years earlier). In 1860, a Presbyterian school commenced in Amherst. By 1861, the population of Amherst borough including Talbot exceeded 2000. The male to female ratio was 2:1. During the 1860s, there was a hospital (closed in the 1930s), a court of petty sessions, seven general stores, three hotels, various tradesmen's enterprises and a diverse gold mining industry.

=== Decline of Amherst ===
In 1859, gold was discovered at nearby Talbot. The town of Talbot increased in size and replaced Amherst in 1875 as the borough/municipality. By 1933, Amherst’s population had dropped to 185. The hospital functioned as a tuberculosis sanatorium until the 1930s, and the school closed in 1946. The post office closed in 1963. The scattered buildings left in Amherst were affected by fire in 1985, although the school building (1874) has been reconstructed. Otherwise, much of the original township has been destroyed. Little remains other than Amherst Cemetery, which was established in 1859. Talbot Arts and Historical Museum opened in 1984. It has a collection of documents and photographs as well as school, cemetery and Amherst hospital records and artefacts that present the history of the pioneers and early settlers of the district.

== Demographics ==
In 2021, Amherst had a population of 63 people with the predominant age group being 60–69 years. Homes were 83.4% owner-occupied. Households were primarily childless couples, and residents generally worked in labourer occupations.
