= Majorca, Victoria =

Majorca
- Town
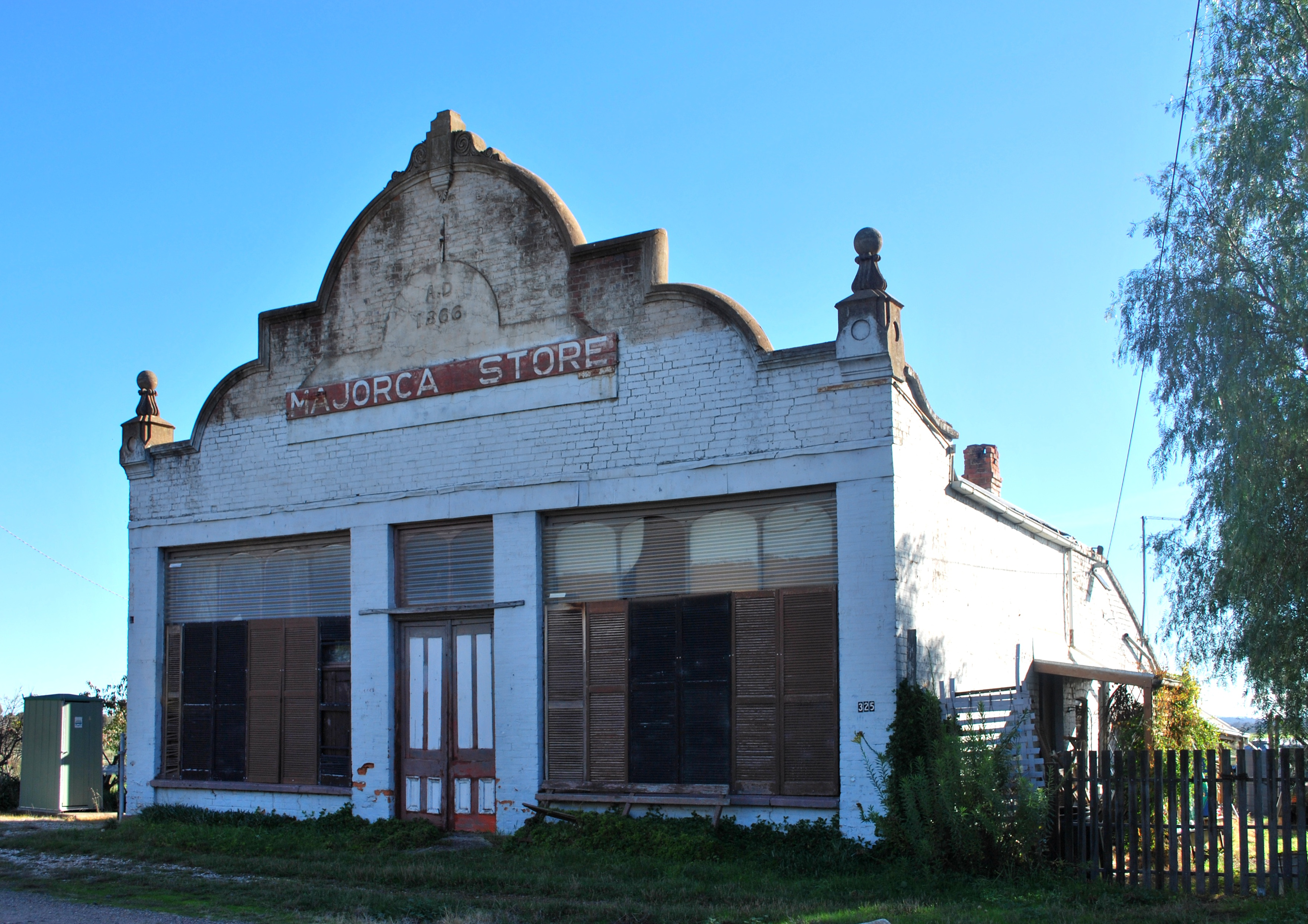
- The old Majorca store, established in 1866 and later abandoned. Destroyed by fire in 2015.

- Coordinates: 37°06′53″S 143°47′50″E
- Country: Australia
- State: Victoria
- LGA: Shire of Central Goldfields
- Location: 171 km (106 mi) NW of Melbourne; 75 km (47 mi) SW of Bendigo; 11 km (6.8 mi) S of Maryborough; 12 km (7.5 mi) NW of Talbot

Government
  - State electorate: Ripon
  - Federal division: Mallee

Population
  - Total: 211 (2016 census)
- Postcode: 3465

Majorca is a locality in central Victoria, Australia. The locality is in the Shire of Central Goldfields, 11 kilometres (6.8 mi) south of Maryborough and 171 kilometres (106 mi) north west of the state capital, Melbourne. At the 2006 census, Majorca and the surrounding rural area had a population of 387. By the time of the 2016 census the population had declined to 211.

== History ==
Majorca was founded in 1863—towards the end of the Victorian gold rush—after two prospectors struck gold at nearby McCallum's Creek. Two months later, there were 250 stores and restaurants catering to a population of around three to four thousand, although many shops and residents soon returned to nearby Maryborough. The town was sustained for over 50 years through gold mining, including the Kong Meng Mine. It is now a rural area consisting mainly of farmland and the Tullaroop Reservoir which helps provide water to Maryborough. The old Majorca store was destroyed by fire and subsequently demolished on May 27, 2015.

== Notable residents ==
- William Blundell (1866–1946)
- Charles Fredricksen (1873–1966)
- Lowe Kong Meng (1831–1888)
- George Nicholas (1831–1937)
