= Bealiba =

Bealiba Victoria
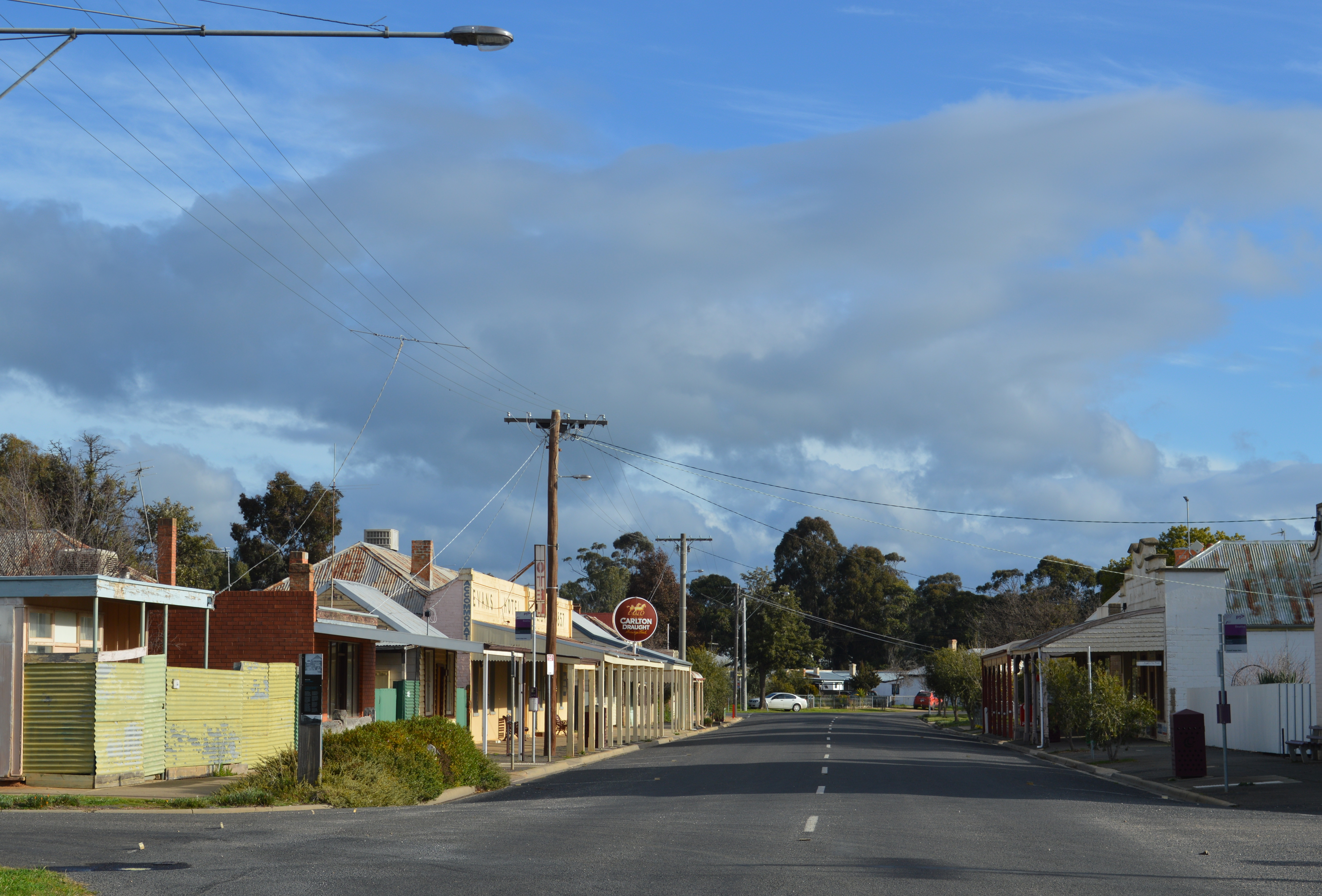
- Main Street

- Coordinates: 36°47′0″S 143°33′0″E
- Population: 206 (2016 census)
- Postcode(s): 3475
- Location: 207 km (129 mi) NW of Melbourne; 74 km (46 mi) W of Bendigo; 43 km (27 mi) NW of Maryborough; 45 km (28 mi) SE of St Arnaud; 21 km (13 mi) SE of Dunolly
- LGA(s): Shire of Central Goldfields; Shire of Loddon
- State electorate(s): Ripon
- Federal division(s): Mallee

Bealiba is a town in the Central Goldfields Shire and Shire of Loddon, Victoria, Australia. The town is located 207 kilometres (129 mi) north-west of the state capital, Melbourne, and 74 kilometres (46 mi) from the regional city of Bendigo. At the 2011 census, Bealiba and the surrounding area had a population of 300.

== History ==
The name is derived from the Djadjawurrung word "Beal-ba" meaning "the red or flooded gum tree". The first Europeans in the Bealiba area were drovers in the 1840s and in 1845 George Coutts was the first European permanent settler. In the midst of the Victorian gold rush, gold was discovered in Bealiba in 1856 and for 18 months the town grew to a population of 18,000. After the rush subsided, the area was opened up for selection by farmers.

Facilities in Bealiba include a post office and general store. The town is home to many historic buildings including the pub (built in 1857) and the Town Hall (built in 1879). However, the pub was closed in 2016 by new owners after 12 months ownership.

Bealiba railway station, on the Mildura railway line opened in 1878. It closed in 1981 under the New Deal reorganisation of country rail services.

The Bealiba Court of Petty Sessions closed on 1 August 1968.

Bealiba shares an Australian rules football team with nearby Natte Yallock—the Natte Bealiba Swans—who compete in the Maryborough Castlemaine District Football League.
