= Red Lion, Victoria =

Red Lion Victoria
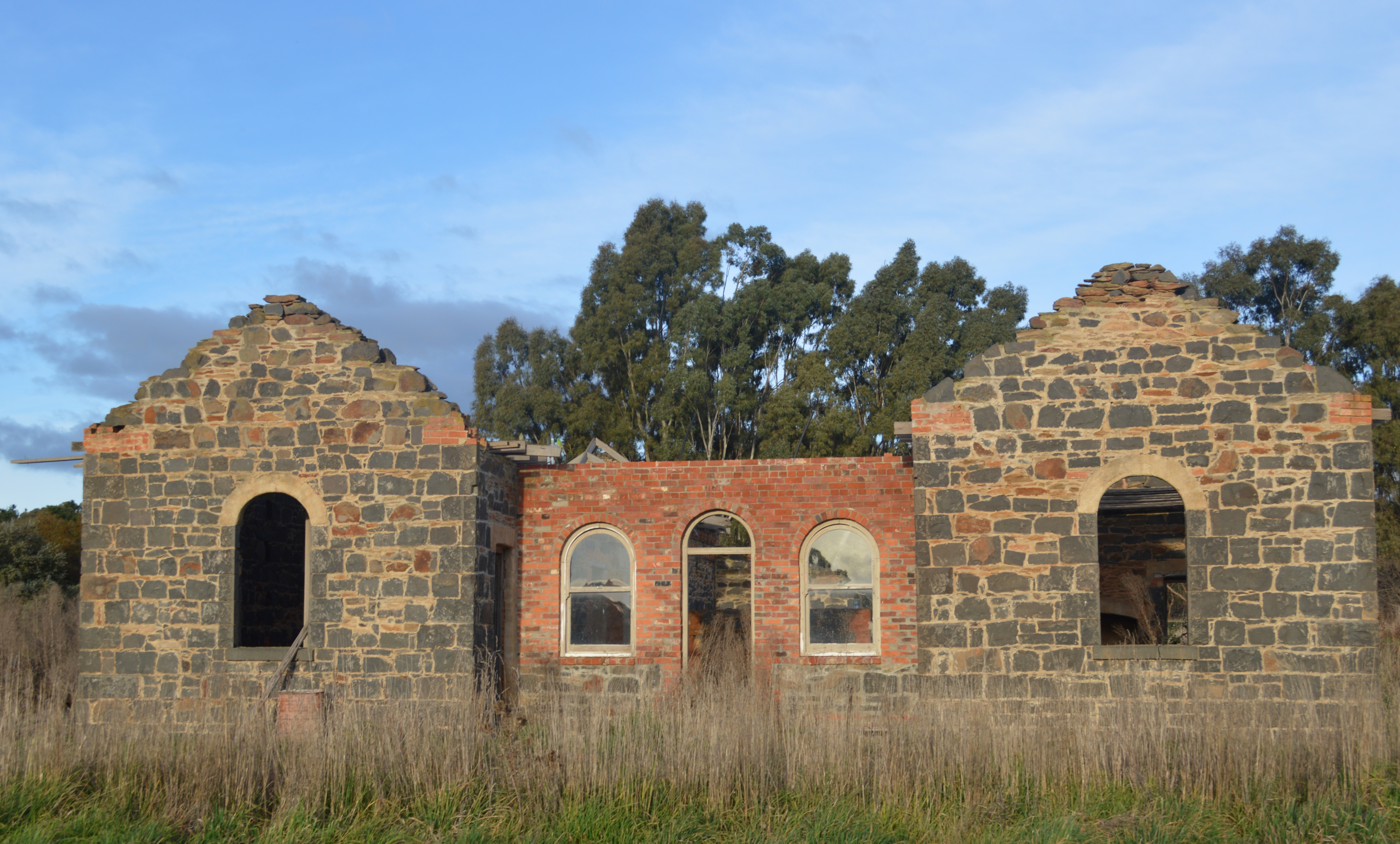
- The ruins of the former Mount Greenock Park Hotel, built in 1852

- Coordinates: 37°09′40″S 143°44′52″E
- Population: 120 (2016 census)
- Postcode(s): 3371
- Location: 157 km (98 mi) NW of Melbourne; 51 km (32 mi) N of Ballarat; 15 km (9 mi) S of Maryborough
- LGA(s): Shire of Central Goldfields
- State electorate(s): Ripon
- Federal division(s): Mallee

Red Lion is a locality in central Victoria, Australia. The locality is in the Shire of Central Goldfields, 157 kilometres (98 mi) north west of the state capital, Melbourne.

At the 2016 census, Red Lion had a population of 120.
