= Moonlight Flat =

Moonlight Flat may refer to:

- Moonlight Flat (Shire of Mount Alexander), Victoria, Australia
- Moonlight Flat (Shire of Central Goldfields), Victoria, Australia
- Moonlight Flat, New Zealand, in Waitaki District
