= Euphemia Eleanor Baker =

Australian photographer and Baháʼí (1880–1968)

Euphemia Eleanor Baker (Effie)
- "Effie" Baker
- Born: Euphemia Eleanor Baker; 25 March 1880; Goldsborough, Colony of Victoria
- Died: 2 January 1968 (aged 87); Waverley, New South Wales
- Occupation: photographer
- Known for: works included in Australian Women Photographers 1890–1950 national exhibition in 1981–82

Euphemia Eleanor Baker (also known as Effie Baker; 25 March 1880 – 2 January 1968) was an Australian photographer, and follower and advocate of the Baháʼí Faith. Initially she took pictures of Australian wildflowers and published them in a booklet form. Later, after becoming a follower of Baháʼí Faith in 1922, she took pictures of the Baháʼí monuments in Australia, New Zealand, Iraq and Persia, some of which were included in Shoghi Effendi's translation of the book The Dawn-Breakers. She became one of the Baháʼí Faith's notable photographers.

== Early life and education ==
Baker was born Euphemia Eleanor (Effie) Baker on 25 March 1880 at Goldsborough, Victoria. Her father was John Baker, a miner, and her mother was Margaret, née Smith; she was the eldest of their eleven children. When she moved in 1886 to Ballarat to live with her grandparents, her grandfather Henry Evans Baker, who worked as the first superintendent at the Ballarat Observatory, infused in her deep interest in scientific instruments, creative thinking, and evolution. She then took keen interest in acquiring knowledge of scientific photography. She studied at Clarendon School, Mount Pleasant State School, and Grenville College. She then studied at Ballarat East School of Art, followed by acquiring knowledge about colours and compositions at the Ballarat Fine Art Gallery's school under the guidance of P. M. Carew-Smyth. In 1892, she also learned to play piano under Edgar Nicolas, well known pianist, and gave piano performances at the Royal South Street Eisteddfod, and also won prizes.

== Photographer ==
In 1898, she developed her interest in photography in Perth and then at Ballarat in 1899; she started taking photographs with a quarter-plate camera which was given to her by her aunt Pheme (Henry Baker's sister). Initially, she made albums of these photographs and presented them to her parents. In 1900, she moved to Black Rock, Melbourne, and lived with her great-aunt Euphemia, who was a headmistress and whose success influenced her. In 1914 she published a booklet of Australian Wild Flowers which contained seven hand-coloured photographs taken by her. This booklet was republished in 1917, 1921, and 1922. She also made and sold fine wooden toys, made doll houses for charity, and painted water-colours of Australian flowers.

== Baháʼí Faith ==
In 1922, there was a major shift in her religious faith when she met Clara Dunn and John Henry Hyde Dunn, who were propagating the Baháʼí Faith that had been established in Persia during the nineteenth century. She attended their lecture on the Baháʼí Faith in Melbourne along with her friend Ruby Beaver. She was so strongly influenced by the teachings of this faith that she became a Baháʼí in 1922. She was the first woman who converted to this faith in Australia.

== Documenting the Baháʼí religions ==
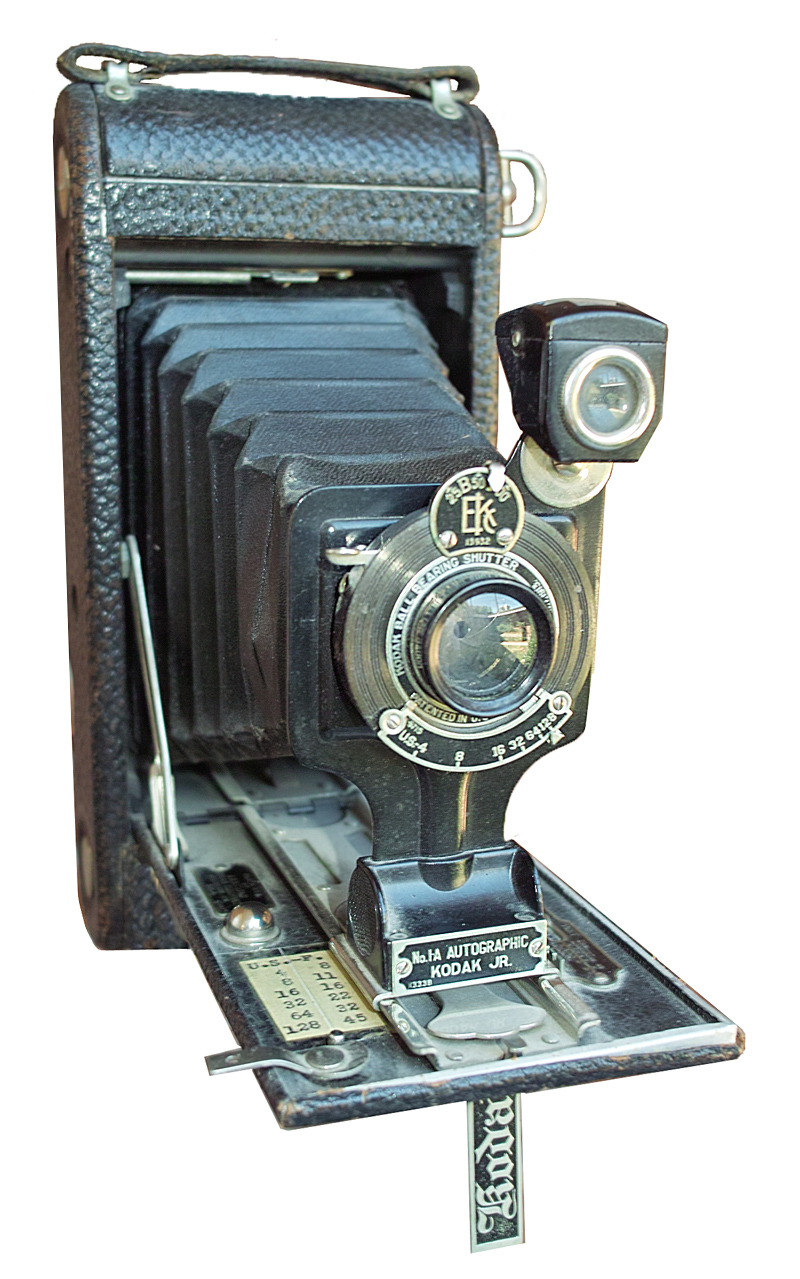
A Kodak 1A-Autographic (Kodak junior), a type of camera that Effie Baker used when in Haifa.

In 1923, Baker travelled to Tasmania, Western Australia, and New Zealand along with Martha Root, a Baháʼí teacher and Esperantist. When she wanted to visit the Baháʼí holy shrines at Haifa, Palestine she suffered from lead poisoning due to licking her paintbrushes. However, she continued on the pilgrimage in January 1925, hoping that the voyage by sea would cure her. After her pilgrimage she lived in England for six months. She then accepted an invitation from Shoghi Effendi, The Guardian (head) of the Baháʼí Faith, to live in Haifa, as hostess of a new hostel meant for Baháʼí pilgrims from western countries. While working there she made many friends. Shoghi Effendi liked her photographic work, and included the photographs she had taken of monument gardens on Mount Carmel and others in the Baháʼí yearbook.

In 1930, at the request of Effendi, Baker toured incognito, mostly dressed in black chador, to take pictures of the origins of the Babí and Baháʼí religions. The travel in the Middle East was then risky for women, and Baháʼís were subject to persecution. Under these conditions she travelled for 8 months between 1930 and 1931 and took a thousand pictures of locations and monuments related to the history of the Baháʼí Faith, in spite of lack of facilities and photographic materials; 400 of these pictures have been published. She had developed the films under moonlight and ensured that each picture was good before leaving that location. After this tour she returned to Haifa. Shoghi Effendi included some of the photographs taken by her as part of his book The Dawn-Breakers (1932), which was a translation of Nabíl-i-Aʻzam's book on the religions' origins.

== Return to Australia and later life ==
In February 1936, Baker returned to Goldsborough and lived with her mother and later with her sister from 1945. In 1963 she moved to a small apartment at Paddington in Sydney, where the Baháʼí national headquarters then were. She worked at the Baháʼí headquarters as a hostess and attended to the archives.

Baker died on 1 January 1968 at Waverley. She was given a Baháʼí funeral and buried at the Mona Vale cemetery on 4 January. The service was well attended, in particular by the people of Baháʼí Faith who came from Yerrinbool Summer School.
