= Flagstaff, Victoria =

Flagstaff Victoria
- Coordinates: 37°03′0″S 143°47′0″E
- Population: 97 (SAL 2021)
- Established: 1854
- Postcode(s): 3465
- LGA(s): Shire of Central Goldfields
- State electorate(s): Ripon
- Federal division(s): Mallee

Flagstaff is a locality in Victoria, Australia, site of a former settlement, located on the Pyrenees Highway east of Maryborough in the Shire of Central Goldfields. 218 metres above sea level, the area is naturally characterised by Box-Ironbark forest. Remnants of aboriginal settlement include rock wells and aboriginal sculptures.

The Australian Census 2021 counted 97 residents, an increase of 10 over 2016.

Flagstaff began as a mining settlement, and covered about 3 miles (4.8 km) along the banks of the local unnamed creek. A state school operated from 1868 to 1939. The building, which still stands, was later used as a community hall in which dances continue to this day.

Gold was officially first discovered at Flagstaff in January 1855 and gained much media attention. Gold was again discovered at Flagstaff in June 1855 and brought many prospectors into the area, including seven local pubs.

A major gold rush to Maryborough occurred from June 1854, although some miners had been working in the area from the previous December. The population grew from 120 to 2,700 in that month and from 7,000 to 20,000 in August 1854.

Seven men, one of whom was Murray Neppy, were camped on their way to the rush close by and found gold at Carisbrook. Neppy valued the name Flagstaff, and thus named the township after it.

The Flagstaff goldfields were just a small part of a huge goldfield with very significant yields and large numbers of miners following the latest gold discoveries.
