= Maryborough Airport (Victoria) =

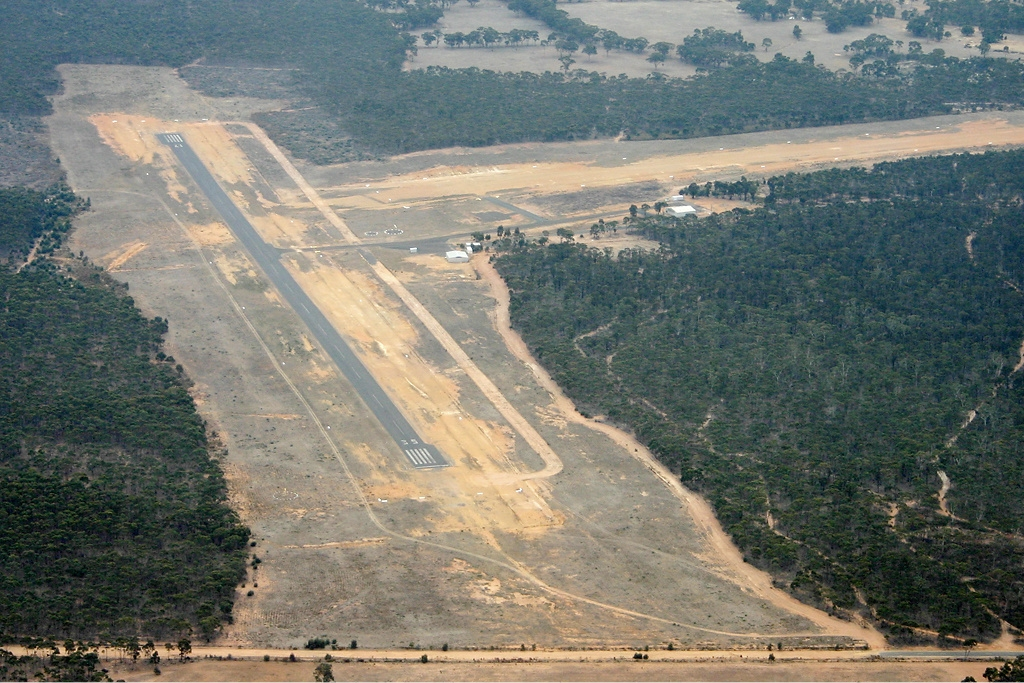
- IATA: none; ICAO: YMBU

Summary
- Airport type: Public
- Owner: Central Goldfields Shire Council
- Operator: Maryborough Aero Club Inc.
- Location: Maryborough, Victoria
- Elevation AMSL: 766 ft / 233 m
- Coordinates: 37°02′00″S 143°42′30″E

Map
- Location in Victoria

Runways
Direction	Length		Surface
Direction	m	ft	Surface
17/35	1,040	3,412	Asphalt
06/24	642	2,106	Gravel
- Sources: AIP

Maryborough Airport (ICAO: YMBU) is located 1.5 nautical miles (2.8 km; 1.7 mi) northwest of Maryborough, Victoria, Australia.

== See also ==
- List of airports in Victoria, Australia
