= Harry Gathercole =

Australian rules footballer

Personal information
- Full name: Harry Gathercole
- Born: 13 April 1887; Dunolly, Victoria
- Died: 5 May 1953 (aged 66); Mildura, Victoria
- Original team: Dunolly

Playing career^{1}
Years	Club	Games (Goals)
1910–11	St Kilda	3 (3)
- ^{1} Playing statistics correct to the end of 1911.

Harry Gathercole (13 April 1887 – 5 May 1953) was an Australian rules footballer who played with St Kilda in the Victorian Football League (VFL).
