= Paddys Ranges State Park =

Protected area in Victoria, Australia

- IUCN category II (national park)
- Location within Victoria
- Location: Victoria
- Nearest city: Maryborough
- Coordinates: 37.1122°S 143.6977°E
- Area: 20.1 km^{2} (7.8 sq mi)
- Established: 1989
- Governing body: Parks Victoria
- Website: Official website

Paddys Ranges State Park, near Maryborough, 170 kilometres (110 mi) northwest of Melbourne, Australia comprises 2,010 hectares (5,000 acres) of native vegetation. Gold mining and eucalyptus oil production within the park date back to the 1840s but have long been closed down. The vegetation is primarily of box-ironbark forest, with prominent golden wattle and native orchids. Swift parrots, painted honeyeaters, wedge-tailed eagles and crested bellbirds are all present.

Some of the notable features in the area are Billy Button Hills, Karri Track Camping Area and Settling Ponds Track Picnic Area. There is a network of designated walking tracks within the park.

Camping and fires are permitted in designated areas.
