= Strathlea =

Strathlea Victoria
- Coordinates: 37°09′03″S 143°58′12″E
- Population: 33 (2021 census)
- Postcode(s): 3464
- LGA(s): Shire of Mount Alexander; Shire of Central Goldfields
- State electorate(s): Bendigo West; Ripon
- Federal division(s): Bendigo; Mallee

Strathlea is a locality in the Shire of Central Goldfields and the Shire of Mount Alexander, Victoria, Australia. At the 2021 census, Strathlea had a population of 33.
