= Joyces Creek =

Joyces Creek Victoria
- Coordinates: 37°05′05″S 143°58′36″E
- Population: 20 (2021 census)
- Postcode(s): 3464
- LGA(s): Shire of Central Goldfields; Shire of Mount Alexander
- State electorate(s): Bendigo West
- Federal division(s): Bendigo; Mallee

Joyces Creek is a locality in the Shire of Central Goldfields and the Shire of Mount Alexander, Victoria, Australia. At the 2021 census, Joyces Creek had a population of 20.

Joyces Creek Football Club won the 1908 Hastie Football Association premiership, having only lost one game for the season.
