= William Blundell (cricketer) =

Australian cricketer

Personal information
- Born: 30 December 1866; Majorca, Victoria, Australia
- Died: 28 February 1946 (aged 79); Kensington, Victoria, Australia

Domestic team information
- Years: Team
- 1903: Victoria
- Source: Cricinfo, 15 November 2015

William Blundell (30 December 1866 – 28 February 1946) was an Australian cricketer. He played one first-class cricket match for Victoria in 1903.

== See also ==
- List of Victoria first-class cricketers
