= Daisy Hill, Victoria =

Coordinates: 37°09′S 143°40′E

Daisy Hill Victoria
- Population: 385 (2016 census)
- Established: 1850s
- Postcode(s): 3465
- Location: 172 km (107 mi) NW of Melbourne; 56 km (35 mi) N of Ballarat
- LGA(s): Shire of Central Goldfields
- State electorate(s): Ripon
- Federal division(s): Mallee
Mean max temp	Mean min temp	Annual rainfall
20.4 °C; 69 °F	8 °C; 46 °F	524 mm 20.6 in

Daisy Hill a locality in Victoria, Australia located in the Shire of Central Goldfields. At the 2016 census, Daisy Hill had a population of 385.

Daisy Hill began as a mining settlement, after a discovery of gold during the Gold Rush of 1853, the location became known as an extremely rich goldfield soon thereafter. Prior to this discovery, Daisy Hill had gained a particular notoriety, due to a gold rush in February 1849, that was based upon the claims made by one Thomas Chapman, a shepherd and former Parkhurst prison exile. Chapman sold a gold nugget to a Melbourne Jeweller, Mr. Brentani of Collins Street. Soon afterwards Chapman left the Port Phillip District for Sydney, although he returned again many years later.

Daisy Hill has a Community Centre Hall and public tennis courts. The last commercial shop in Daisy Hill closed around 2008.

== See also ==
Amherst, Victoria
