= Maryborough meteorite =

Meteorite found in Victoria, Australia

- Type: Chondrite
- Class: Ordinary chondrite
- Group: H chondrite
- Country: Australia
- Coordinates: 37°05′21″S 143°44′32″E
- Observed fall: No
- Found date: 2015-5
- TKW: 17 kilograms (37 lb)

The Maryborough meteorite is a meteorite that was found in the Maryborough Regional Park near the town of Maryborough in Victoria, Australia. At 17 kilograms (37.5 lb), the Maryborough meteorite is the second largest ever to be found in the state. It has a sculpted and dimpled outer surface due to the melting it experienced while plunging through Earth’s atmosphere, and its interior, consisting of dense forms of iron and nickel, is speckled with chondrules.

It was discovered in May 2015 by Australian prospector, David Hole, while searching for gold using a metal detector. He was initially impressed by the density and extreme weight of the reddish rock, which was only identified as a meteorite in 2018. After a sliver was sliced off with a diamond saw, staff of the Melbourne Museum could confirm its identity. It was revealed to be an H chondrite, some 4.6 billion years old, which based on carbon-14 dating results, fell to earth between 100 and 1,000 years ago.

There have been a number of historic meteor sightings in the Maryborough district, but none of them can be definitively tied to the find site. In one such sighting of June 1923, Harry E. Hallett reported a brilliant meteor which "almost dazzled" him.

== Classification ==
A team of geologists described the specimen in the Proceedings of the Royal Society of Victoria. It is classified as an H5 ordinary chondrite.
