= Craigie, Victoria =

Craigie
- Town
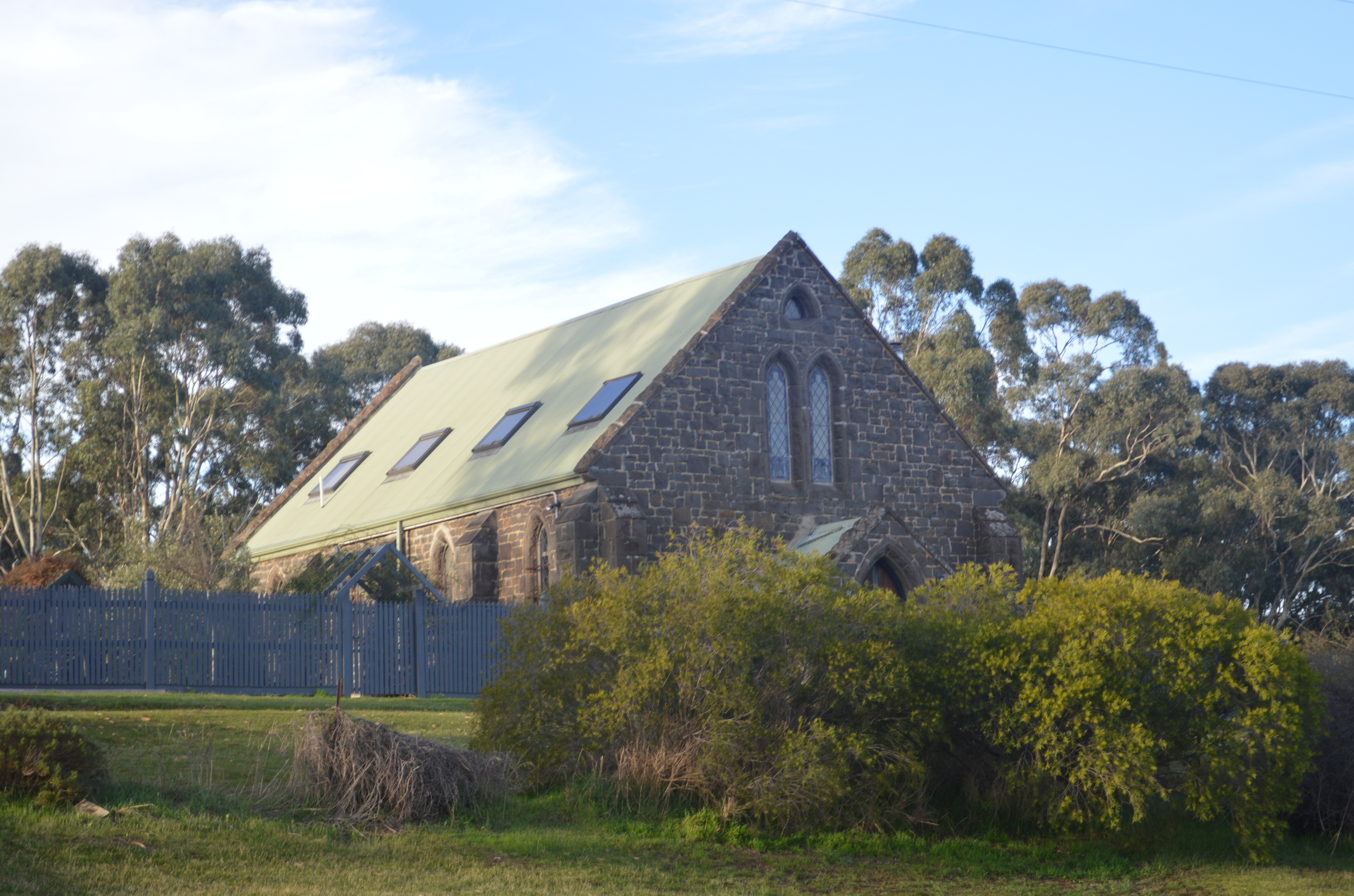
- A former church in Craigie, now converted into a residence, 2017

- Coordinates: 37°09′40″S 143°44′52″E
- Country: Australia
- State: Victoria
- LGA: Shire of Central Goldfields
- Location: 164 km (102 mi) NW of Melbourne; 58 km (36 mi) N of Ballarat; 8 km (5.0 mi) S of Maryborough

Government
  - State electorate: Ripon
  - Federal division: Mallee

Population
  - Total: 57 (2016 census)
- Postcode: 3468

Craigie is a locality in central Victoria, Australia. It is in the Shire of Central Goldfields, 164 kilometres (102 mi) north west of the state capital, Melbourne.

At the 2016 census, Craigie had a population of 57.
