= Moonlight Flat (Shire of Central Goldfields) =

Moonlight Flat Victoria
- Coordinates: 37°02′50″S 143°39′44″E
- Population: 85 (2021 census)
- Postcode(s): 3465
- LGA(s): Shire of Central Goldfields
- State electorate(s): Ripon
- Federal division(s): Mallee

Moonlight Flat is locality in Shire of Central Goldfields, Victoria, Australia. At the 2021 census, Moonlight Flat had a population of 85.
