= Goldsborough, Victoria =

Goldsborough
- Town
- Coordinates: 36°49′12″S 143°39′19″E
- Country: Australia
- State: Victoria
- LGAs: Shire of Central Goldfields; Shire of Loddon

Government
  - State electorate: Ripon
  - Federal division: Mallee

Population
  - Total: 37 (2021 census)
- Postcode: 3472

Goldsborough is a locality in the Shire of Loddon and the Shire of Central Goldfields, Victoria, Australia. At the 2021 census, Goldsborough had a population of 37.

== History ==
Goldsborough is located on the lands of the Dja Dja Wurrung people.

Goldsborough is the location of the Dunolly homestead, originally built by the pastoralist Archibald McDougall. Following the establishment of Dunolly in 1857, the homestead site became known as Old Dunolly. The name Goldsborough was from Richard Goldsborough, a leasehold pastoralist who later became a partner in the woolbroking firm Goldsborough Mort and Co.

The township of Goldsborough was surveyed and its allotments sold around the time gold was found in the area. Gold-bearing reefs extended generally northward from Goldsborough toward Moliagul. The town of Inkerman was located approximately three kilometres north of Goldsborough. A school opened at Inkerman in 1860 to serve children from both Inkerman and Goldsborough. When a larger school building was required in 1882 due to increased student numbers, the facility was relocated to Goldsborough, where most of the population lived.

By the mid-1860s, Goldsborough had two hotels and a Wesleyan church. The Queen's Birthday reef was mined profitably from 1865 to 1896, while the Belgian and Perseverance reefs also had long operational lives and were worked again during the 1920s and 1930s. Goldsborough railway station was situated on the Dunolly–Bealiba line, which opened in 1878. The station closed to passengers in 1975.

In 1920, a eucalyptus oil extraction plant was established at Goldsborough, the fourth such operation in the Dunolly district. Local eucalyptus species grew abundantly in the area, and the oil sold for a relatively high price in export markets.
