= Shire of Central Goldfields =

Coordinates: 37°03′00″S 143°44′00″E

- Local government area
- Location in Victoria

- Interactive map of Shire of Central Goldfields
- Country: Australia
- State: Victoria
- Region: Loddon Mallee
- Established: 1995
- Council seat: Maryborough

Government
  - Mayor: Ben Green
  - State electorate: Ripon
  - Federal division: Mallee

Area
  - Total: 1,533 km^{2} (592 sq mi)

Population
  - Total: 13,483 (2021)
  - Density: 8.795/km^{2} (22.779/sq mi)
- Gazetted: 19 January 1995
- Website: Shire of Central Goldfields
LGAs around Shire of Central Goldfields
Northern Grampians	Loddon	Loddon
Pyrenees	Shire of Central Goldfields	Mount Alexander
Pyrenees	Hepburn	Macedon Ranges

Shire of Central Goldfields is a local government area in Victoria, Australia, located in the central part of the state. It covers an area of 1,533 square kilometres (592 mi^{2}) and, in August 2021 had a population of 13,483. It includes the towns of Bealiba, Carisbrook, Dunolly, Maryborough and Talbot.

The Shire is governed and administered by the Central Goldfields Shire Council; its seat of local government and administrative centre is located at the council headquarters in Maryborough. It also has a service centre located in Talbot. The Shire is named after the region having historically been a major goldfields region in central Victoria.

== History ==
The Shire of Central Goldfields was formed in 1995 from the amalgamation of the City of Maryborough, the vast bulk of the Shire of Tullaroop, the western half of the Shire of Bet Bet and the northern half of Shire of Talbot and Clunes.

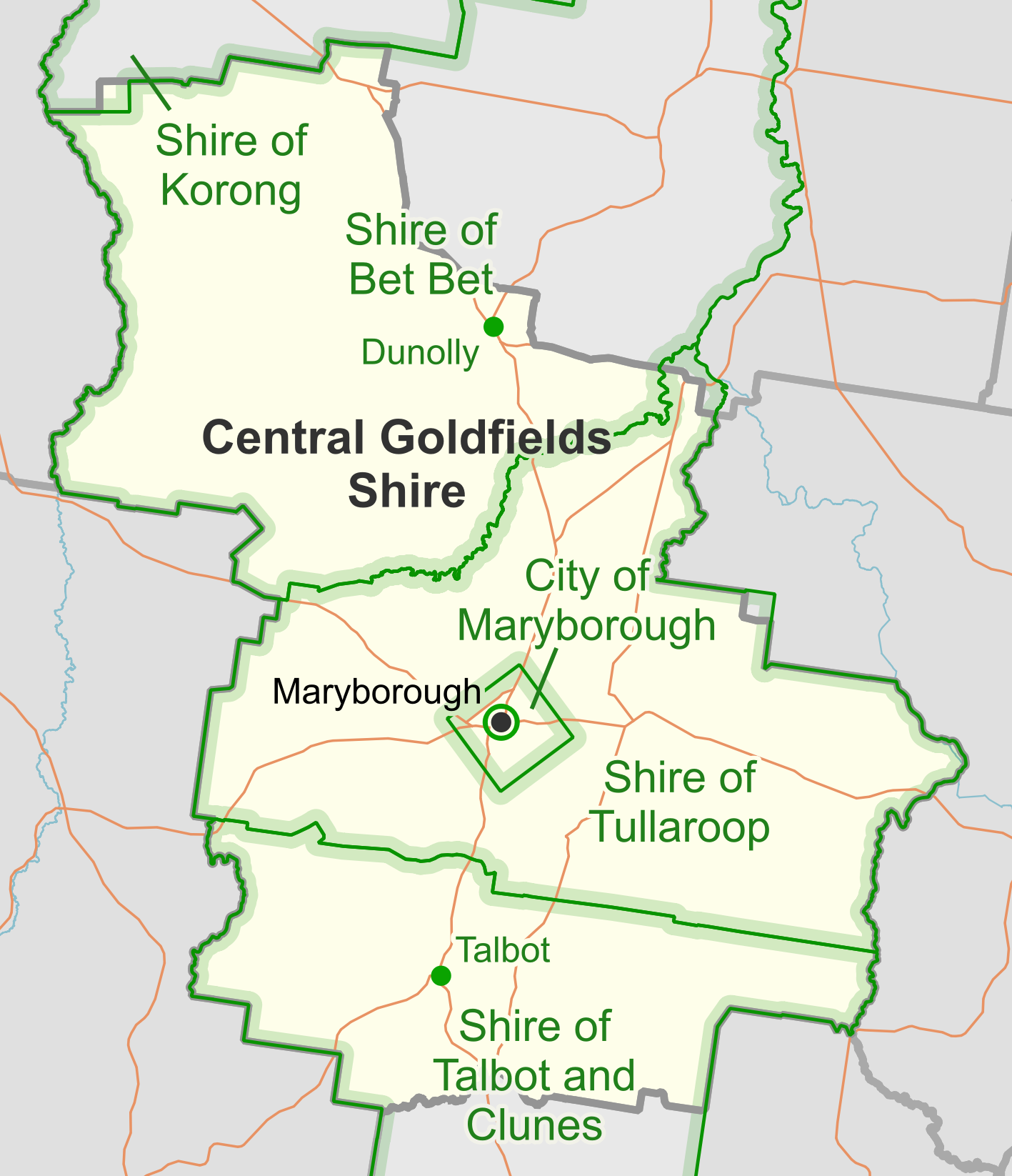
Central Goldfields Shire's predecessor LGAs (green) as they were in 1994. The administrative centres of the former LGAs are marked by green dots.

== Council ==
=== Current composition ===
The council is composed of seven single member wards.

Councillors elected at the 2024 election are:

Ward	Councillor	Notes
Flynn	Liesbeth Long	
Maryborough Central	Gerard Murphy	
Maryborough East	Jake Meyer	
Maryborough North	Geoff Bartlett	
Maryborough West	Grace La Vella	
Paddys Ranges	Ben Green	Mayor
Tullaroop	Anna De Villiers	Deputy

=== Administration and governance ===
The council meets in the council chambers at the council headquarters in the Maryborough Municipal Offices, which is also the location of the council's administrative activities. It also provides customer services at both its administrative centre in Maryborough, and its service centre in Talbot.

== Townships and localities ==
In the 2021 census, the shire had a population of 13,483, up from 12,995 in the 2016 census.

Population
Locality	2016	2021
Adelaide Lead	81	85
Alma	201	195
Amherst	65	63
Archdale^	21	23
Archdale Junction^	6	12
Bealiba^	206	213
Bet Bet	129	135
Betley	102	101
Bowenvale	181	209
Bromley	56	46
Caralulup	3	3
Carisbrook^	1,115	1,192
Cotswold	12	20
Craigie	57	62
Daisy Hill	385	398
Dunach	58	83
Dunluce	36	36
Dunolly^	893	899
Eddington^	96	113
Emu^	32	37
Flagstaff	87	97
Goldsborough^	36	37
Havelock	74	83
Inkerman^	*	#
Joyces Creek^	12	20
Majorca	211	198
Maryborough	7,921	8,160
Moliagul^	88	80
Moolort^	32	44
Moonlight Flat	77	85
Mount Glasgow	85	92
Mount Hooghly	19	18
Natte Yallock^	94	89
Rathscar^	21	19
Red Lion	120	111
Simson	69	76
Strathlea^	24	33
Talbot	442	452
Timor	58	68
Timor West	24	23
Wareek^	68	72

^ - Territory divided with another LGA
* - Not noted in 2016 Census
# - Not noted in 2021 Census

== See also ==
- List of places of worship in Central Goldfields Shire
- List of localities (Victoria)
