= Dunolly =

- Town
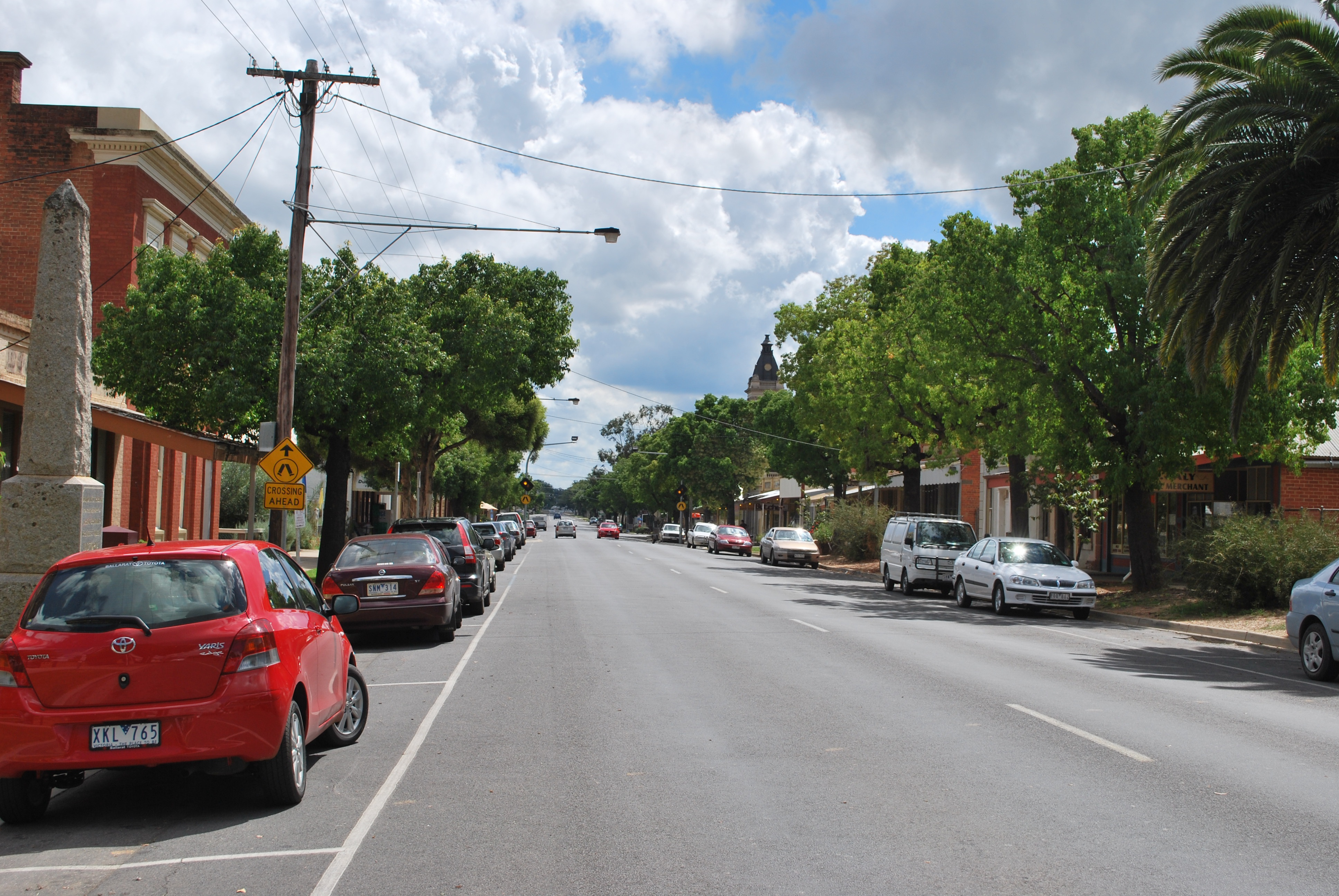
- Broadway, the main street of Dunolly

- Coordinates: 36°51′0″S 143°44′0″E
- Country: Australia
- State: Victoria
- LGA: Shire of Central Goldfields
- Location: 188 km (117 mi) NW of Melbourne; 61 km (38 mi) W of Bendigo; 23 km (14 mi) N of Maryborough

Government
  - State electorate: Ripon
  - Federal division: Mallee

Population
  - Total: 893 (2016 census)
- Postcode: 3472
Localities around Dunolly
Goldsborough	Painswick	Waanyarra
Archdale Junction	Dunolly	Laanecoorie
Mount Hooghly	Bet Bet	Bromley

Dunolly is a town in Victoria, Australia, located on the Dunolly - Maryborough Road, in the Shire of Central Goldfields. At the 2016 census, Dunolly had a population of 893, down from 969 in 2006.

== History ==
The town began during the Victorian Gold Rush. It is located on the traditional lands of the Dja Dja Wurrung people, who called the area Lea Kuribur.

One of the first accounts of the Dunolly Gold Rush was recorded by the Bendigo Advertiser on 3 July 1857 that estimated the population at 12,000. Confirmation of a rush followed on 10 July.

The exact date that Dunolly was founded is unknown. The location of the township itself moved four times before the 1856 rush, further adding to the confusion of its early history. The modern town is the 5th location, and was founded in July 1856 with the previous resettlements driven by further discoveries of gold leads. Technically, even at this time Dunolly was not a town. It was held as a municipality from 1858 to 1863, and wasn't officially declared a borough until 1 October 1863.

Goldborough Post Office opened on 1 March 1856 and was renamed Dunolly in 1859.

One of the largest natural gold nuggets ever found, the legendary "Welcome Stranger", was discovered in nearby Moliagul township.

Rail came to Dunolly with the opening of the Mildura railway line in 1875. Another branch line that connected to Inglewood in 1888.

The Dunolly Magistrates' Court closed on 1 August 1981.

== Attractions ==
Centred on the main street, Broadway, Dunolly features a rural transaction centre, SES, CFA, a pre-school and a primary school, and many businesses. Dunolly hosts a monthly market for vendors from all over Victoria and other states.

Although Dunolly is located on a major rail line, no passenger services are available, but regular bus services offer travel to and from Dunolly.

There is a local museum on Broadway which has a large collection of historic photographs, goldfields implements, replicas of gold nuggets, ladies fashions, needlework, and guns. It also offers a family research facility and regular history tours.

Dunolly has become a favourite location for gold fossicking using metal detectors. In 2016–2017, gold nuggets of 4 kg (8.8 lb) and 4.3 kg (9.5 lb) were found near Dunolly. The nuggets have been valued at around $300,000.

== Sport and recreation ==
Dunolly has a prestigious 18 hole golf club, with sand greens and winding creeks, situated in Short St and caters for all classes of golfers.

Dunolly Football / Netball Club

The town's Australian Rules football and netball club, the Dunolly Eagles was formed in 1873 and has competed in the Maryborough Castlemaine District Football League since 2004.

In 1892, Dunolly defeated St Arnaud and won the prize of 20 gold medals and in 1894 Dunolly defeated St Arnaud and won the Giles Premiership Trophy.

Star AFL recruits, Shannon Motlop and Robbie Ahmat, played with the losing senior football team in the 2009 Maryborough Castlemaine District Football League grand final.

- Football Timeline
  - 1873 - 1891: Club formed and played friendly matches, but no formal competition
  - 1892 - Giles Medals
  - 1893 - ?
  - 1894 - Giles Trophy
  - 1895 - Dunolly Electorate Trophy (Mr Daniel Duggan, MLA) Inglewood defeated Dunolly
  - 1896 - 1897: Unknown competition
  - 1898 - 1902: Club active, but no formal competition
  - 1903 - ? Football Association. Premiers
  - 1904 - Loddon Valley FA
  - 1907 - 1913: Maryborough District Football League
  - 1914 - Dunolly Football Association
  - 1915 - Maryborough District Football League
  - 1916 - 1918: DFC in recess, due to World War I.
  - 1919 - 1935: Maryborough District Football League
  - 1936 - 1939: Loddon Valley Football League
  - 1940 - Maryborough District Football League
  - 1941 - 1944: Club in recess due to World War II
  - 1945 - 1981: Maryborough District Football League
  - 1982 - 2000: Lexton Plains Football League
  - 2001 - 2003: Loddon Valley Football League
  - 2004 - 2025: Maryborough District Football League
- VFL / AFL Players
  - 1909 - Stan Martin - University
  - 1910 - Harry Gathercole - St Kilda
  - 1925 - Ned Kick - Carlton
  - 1951 - Doug Beasy - Carlton

== Gallery ==
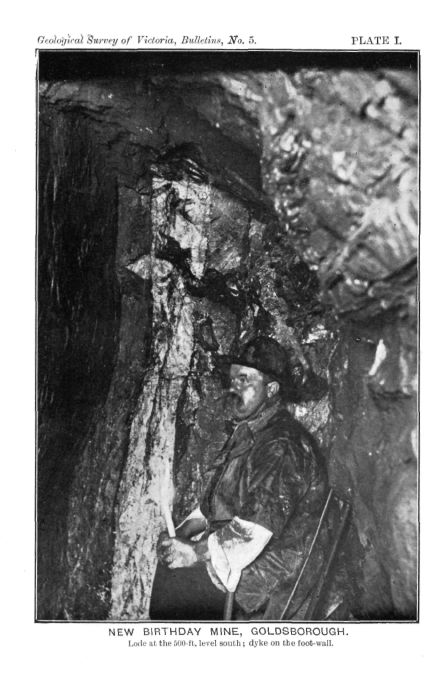
Dunnoly New Birthday Mine, Goldsborough, Lode at the 500 ft level

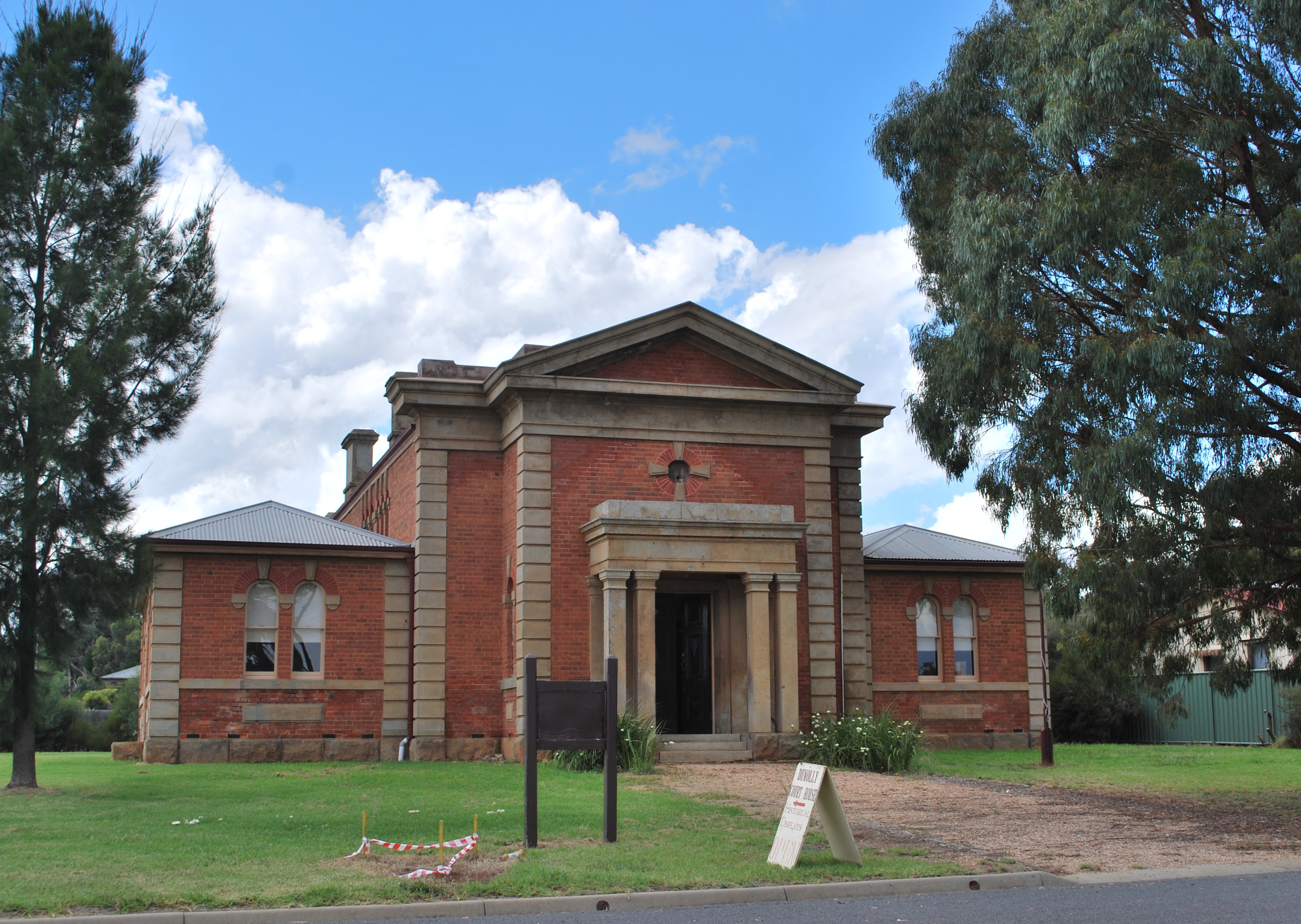
Dunolly Court House

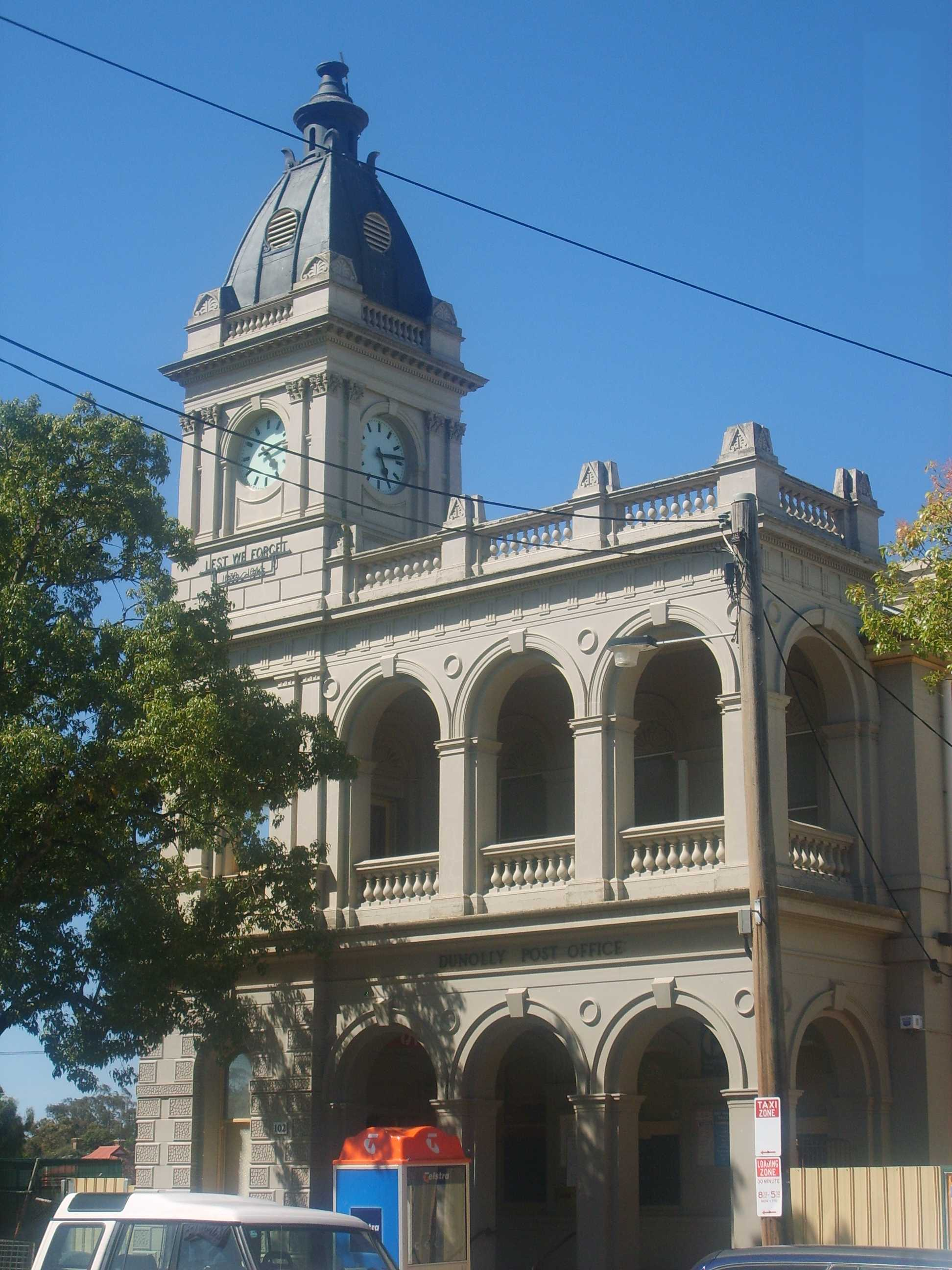
The central Post Office
