= Talbot, Victoria =

Talbot
- Town
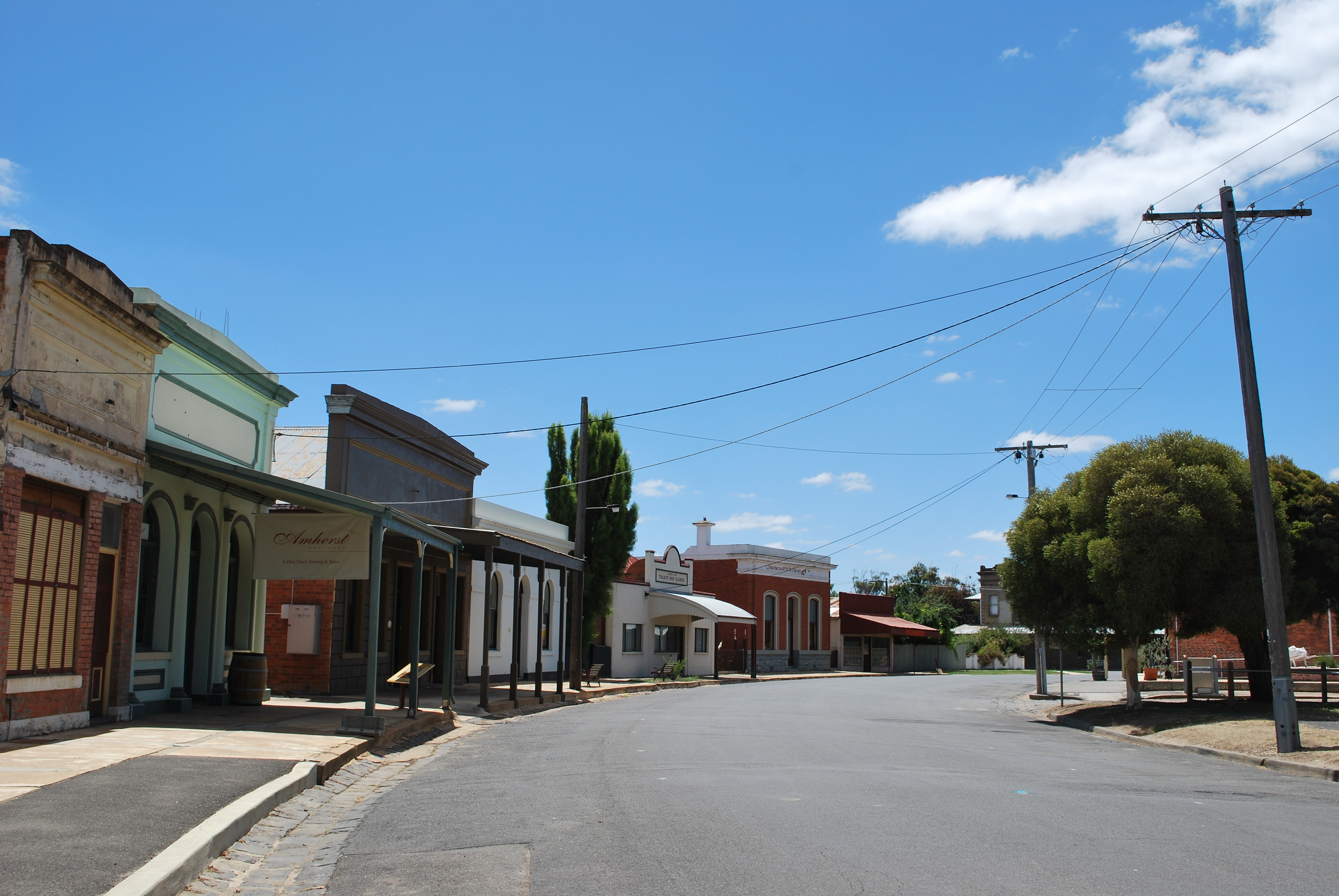
- Scandinavian Crescent in Talbot

- Coordinates: 37°10′0″S 143°42′0″E
- Country: Australia
- State: Victoria
- LGA: Shire of Central Goldfields
- Location: 167 km (104 mi) NW of Melbourne; 53 km (33 mi) N of Ballarat; 16 km (9.9 mi) S of Maryborough; 18 km (11 mi) NW of Clunes

Government
  - State electorate: Ripon
  - Federal division: Mallee

Population
  - Total: 442 (2016 census)
- Postcode: 3371

Talbot is a town in Victoria, Australia. At the 2016 census, Talbot had a population of 442.

== History ==
In September 1836, Major Thomas Livingstone Mitchell and his party reached the Talbot district and passed in the vicinity of Mount Greenock. Upon his return to Sydney he gave impressive reports as to the suitability of the land for sheep grazing. The settlement commenced when Alexander McCallum arrived in the area in June 1841. A grazing lease for Dunach Forest, an area of 63,640 acres (257.5 km²) was granted to him on 1 April 1848. Donald Cameron had already established himself at Clunes in 1839. For the next decade the area was not greatly changed by the efforts of the settlers who lived and raised their flocks in the solitude of the bush. This peaceful scene was soon to change as the news of gold find spread throughout the colonies and to Europe and America.

=== Gold and the development of Talbot ===
With the discovery of gold, the pleasant pastoral scene changed as the gold seekers from various parts of the world invaded the country-side looking for the precious metal. The first unofficial record of a discovery of gold in the area was at Daisy Hill on Hall and McNeill’s ‘Glen Mona Run’. The discovery was made by a shepherd, Thomas Chapman. This discovery was not reported for fear of prosecution for gold digging. Official gold finds in Victoria date from 1851, but there is evidence of many unofficial finds like the one at Glen Mona. The first official discovery in the area around Talbot was made by two South Australians and their families at Daisy Hill Creek (later Amherst) in 1852. One of the men was Cowley, the other was John Potter. Potter claimed they unearthed a nugget while trying to free a bogged wagon. The rush to Daisy Hill followed his discovery. Amherst was first called by that name in official letters in May 1853. The population in those early years drifted up and down according to the reports from other areas. The miners started to test the ground around Back Creek and soon discoveries were made. During 1854 the only mining at Back Creek was on the creek about 2 and half miles from Amherst. Later in 1854 there was a big rush to Amherst and Back Creek. The rich ground of Ballarat Hill, Nuggetty Gully and Kangaroo Flat (Carallulup) were opened up. At the beginning of 1855 there were about 2500 diggers and store owners at Back Creek as well as 300 women and children. There was a certain amount of crime on the gold fields. Horse stealing, burglaries and violence were common.

Goodwoman’s Hill rush began in March 1855 behind Dale Goodwoman’s Hotel. This influential rush at Back Creek saw nuggets of 60 oz, 40 oz and 38 oz (1.86, 1.25 and 1.18 kg) unearthed. This led to discoveries at Bakery Hill and Church Hill. In May 1855 the Chinese arrived and setup camps in Long Gully and Nuggetty Gully. New rushes took place at Daisy Hill Flat (Three Mile), Mount Greenock, Mia Mia and White Hills. Enormous finds were made during this period. Nuggets 160 oz to 267 oz (5.0 to 8.3 kg) were found and holes yielding 250 ounces (7.8 kg) and a pound (370 g) of gold load have been recorded. From 1855 until 1859 the population varied according to the finds in the locality. A water scheme built by Stewart and Farnsworth on Stoney Creek provided water for sluicing at Back Creek. This is now the Talbot Water supply storage. The next major development in the history of the area was the Scandinavian Rush in 1859. It was this rush that established the present township of Talbot. In July 1858 two deep leads joined up. One started in Nuggetty Gully while the other commenced on Ballarat Hill. Claims were taken up on Goodwoman’s Hill and now the leads moved north. The Scandinavian Rush was the continuation of workings at Goodwoman’s Hill. The prospectors of this rush were Carl Hallem, Adolph and Carl Olsen and Joseph Bell. The Scandinavian Rush began in earnest in the early part of 1859 and the diggers found the areas "alive with gold". Windlasses were going in all directions, tents erected in every available spot. The riches dug up were enormous. At this time, the main street was being formed at the Crescent. By March 1859 there was an estimate of 15,000 people at the rush. The main street was called Scandinavian Crescent in March and hundreds of places of business were opened to cater for the needs of the diggers. Camp Street became the new road to Amherst. Reports of large nuggets and great yields kept the miners in the area. The ‘Amherst and Back Creek Advertiser’ was started in March followed by the ‘North-West Chronicle’. Permanent buildings replaced temporary tents in Camp Street. A post office, several banks (such as the National, Bank of Australasia, London Bank of Australia, The Victoria) and a church were started. During that fabulous month of March, there were six streets of stores. Oxford Street was a narrow row of stores. Other streets established were Bond Street, Russell Street, Ballarat Street and Chapman Street. The latter was then called Sturt Street. The area must have presented a bewildering scene to the casual observer. A theatre opened in Oxford Street towards the end of the month. At Robinson & Co. store a post office opened with a Mr. Andrews as the postmaster.

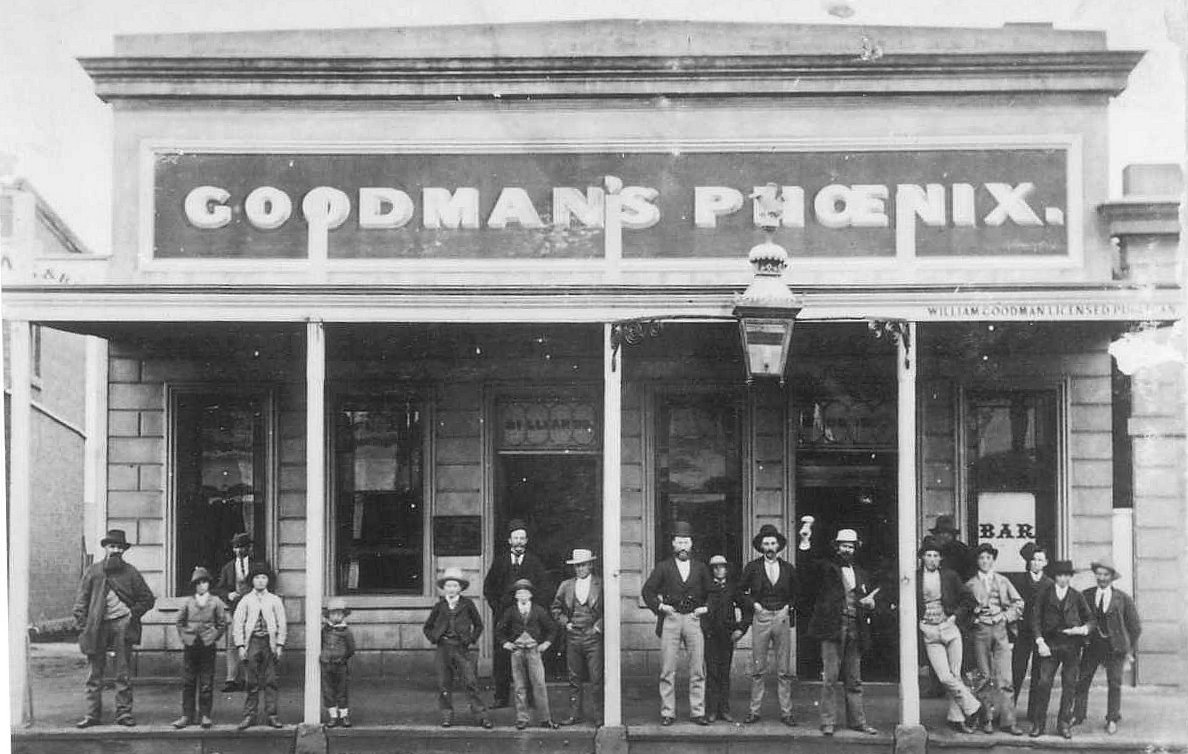
Goodman's Phoenix Hotel built after Goodman's original Hotel was destroyed by fire. The Phoenix still stands in Scandinavean Crescent today.

To break through the basalt cap over the gold saw the introduction of blasting. Some unlucky miners met their deaths in blasting accidents at this time. Such mishaps could not deter the miners from the wealth that was found from this field. This must have been one of the, if not the most, exciting births of any town in the country. Noise and confusion from large numbers of excited diggers, the clang of anvils, the rattle of windlasses and the explosions from blasting. The sights recorded by visiting correspondents—a cake of gold (200 ounces or 6 kg) in a gold broker’s window in the crescent and in another, 1,500 ounces (47 kg) of nuggets—seem like fairy tales. Such was the wealth of this area. In November 1858 the first sitting of a newly proclaimed Amherst Borough Council took place. This council was formed to administer the district including the Back Creek area. From the period we can obtain information via the Municipal Rate records. Crown survey of allotments took place in 1861-62. From these sources a view of the number and type of business ventures can be ascertained. For example, the Crescent could boast 23 restaurants, a variety of hotels and ale stores, tobacconists, 4 butchers, 5 boot shops or boot makers, 3 tent shops, 6 drapers, a number of druggists or chemist shops, milliners, saddlers, confectioners and billiard saloons. This list is just a cross section to show the variety of goods and services available to diggers.

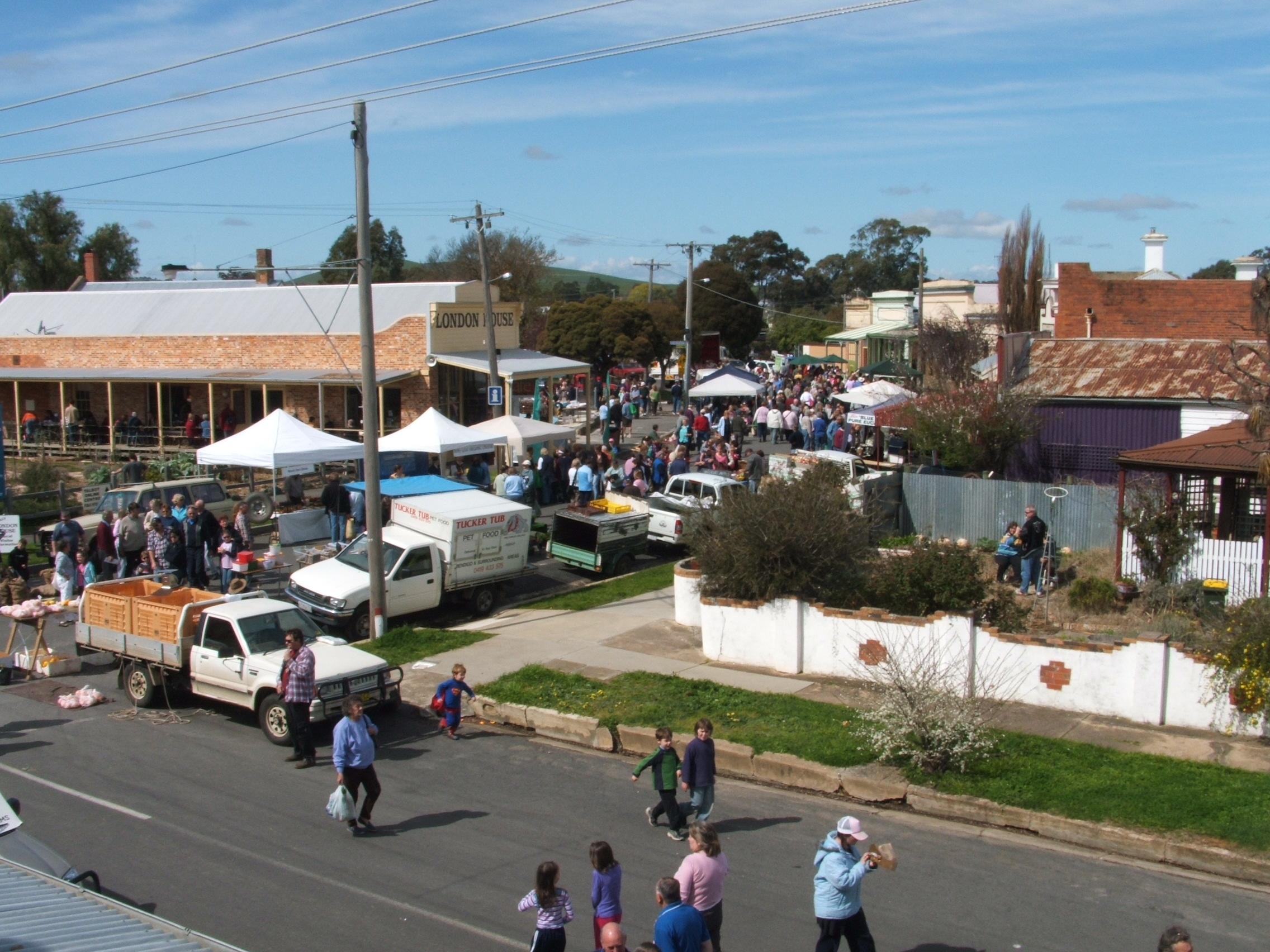
The Talbot Farmers Market attracts in excess of one thousand people every month.

The Scandinavian Rush subsided in 1860. It had created a town and provided a population. At this time the "Frontage System" regulations came into force. This was an arrangement where parties were guaranteed priority of place on a lead according to the date of their registration. During this period there were possible one hundred companies working in the area. Some of these companies were the Great Extended Conway Castle, Independent, Talbot Paddock Co., Prince Alfred and Morton Extended. In 1862 the Sadowa Co. sank a shaft in the paddock owned by W.G. McCulloch. It got about 60,000 ounces of gold before it lost the lead. This lead has not been found. Companies on the Mount Greenock lead were the Union Co. (owned by Carl Schultz and Alolph Von Pein), the Hoffnung Co. (owned by Klein and Christensen), The Rip Van Winkle, Nichols Freehold Co., The Robert Nicholl and the Greenock Estate. Talbot had made rapid strides in its development. In 1864 it had a Court House, borough offices, seven schools, a street of good shops, two breweries, churches, two soap and candle factories, sixteen hotels, coach services and general carriers, and a number of crushers. It also had a population of about 3,400 (the accuracy of this figure could vary because of the transient nature of the miners). There were also cultivation blocks and dairy farms and a common pasturage which operated with the aid of a pound keeper. Talbot was officially named on 19 October 1861 by the then Governor of Victoria, Sir Henry Barkly. The area continued to develop during the sixties and on 31 October 1865 the Shire of Talbot was proclaimed. The Post Office had opened as Back Creek on 24 February 1854 and renamed Talbot in 1862.

Many of the buildings still existing in the town were built during the 1860s and 1870s. During the late 1880s the mines began to close and the population slowly started to drift away. The return of soldiers from the First World War saw an acceleration of this drift. With no established industries left, the town today is only a shadow of the town born during those early days of 1860. However, Talbot still has an interesting story to tell to any visitors. A resurgence of people and business attracted to the landscape and the town's rich history and architecture have seen the redevelopment of the town once again.

== The Town today ==
A popular Farmers Market sees thousands of people descend on the town the third Sunday of every month. The increase in tourism in areas such as Daylesford and Avoca is encouraging new businesses with several new restaurants and shops opening recently.

The town has an Australian Rules football team competing in the Maryborough Castlemaine District Football League.

Golfers play at the course of the Talbot Golf Club on Lexton Road.

== Local folklore and ghost sightings ==
Like many regions in the Central Goldfields region Talbot is rich with stories and myths that developed from its rich gold mining history, one such story is the ghost of Henry Schroeder who was a miner who died in a mining accident just outside Talbot in 1884 when a shaft collapsed.

His ghost is said to roam the hills of Mt Greenock just outside of Talbot searching for his missing sack of gold. Prospectors around the Central Goldfields area have claimed to encounter him when prospecting for gold leading many relic hunters to search for the missing Schroeders sack for his riches.
