= Maryborough, Victoria =

Maryborough
- City
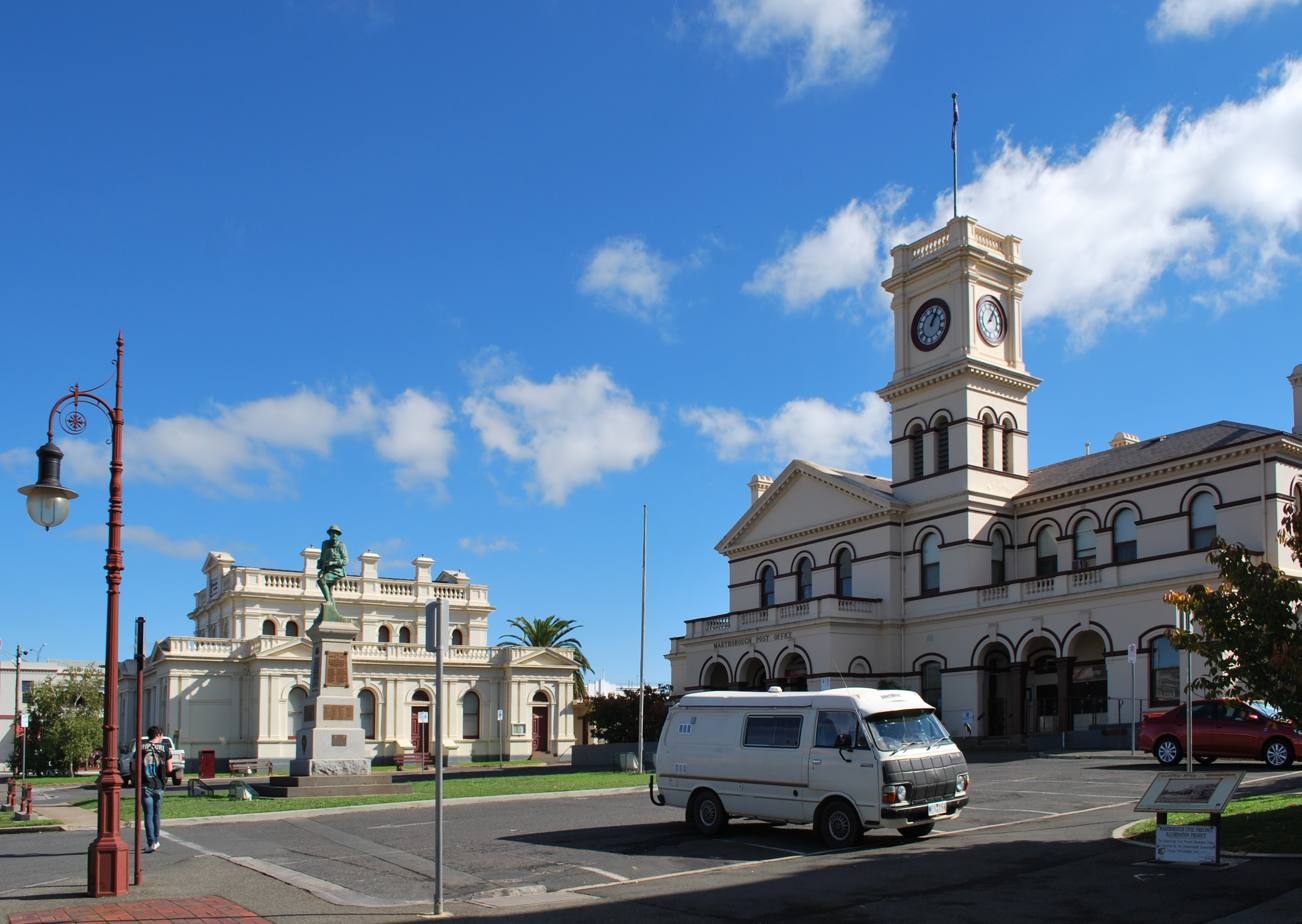
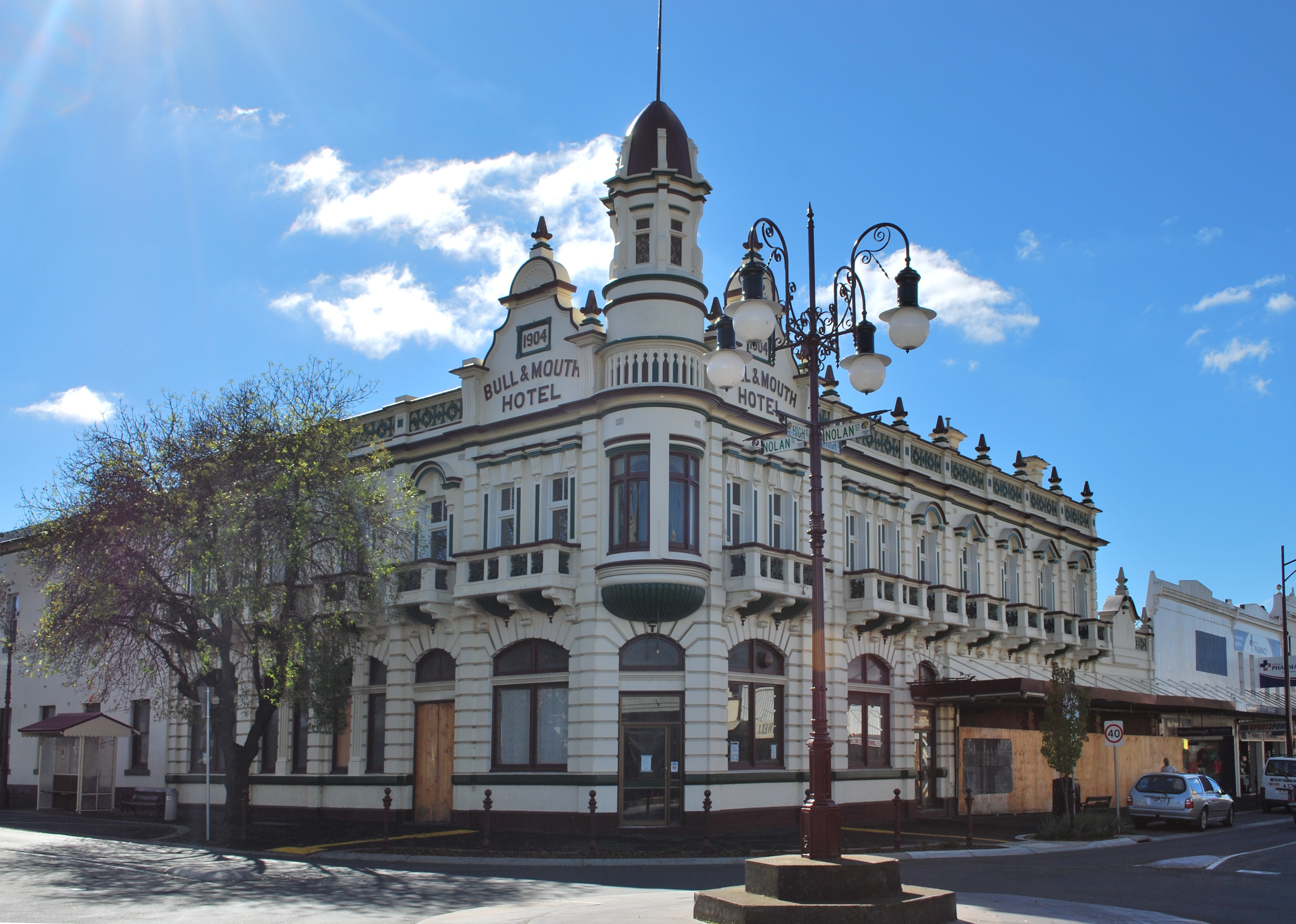
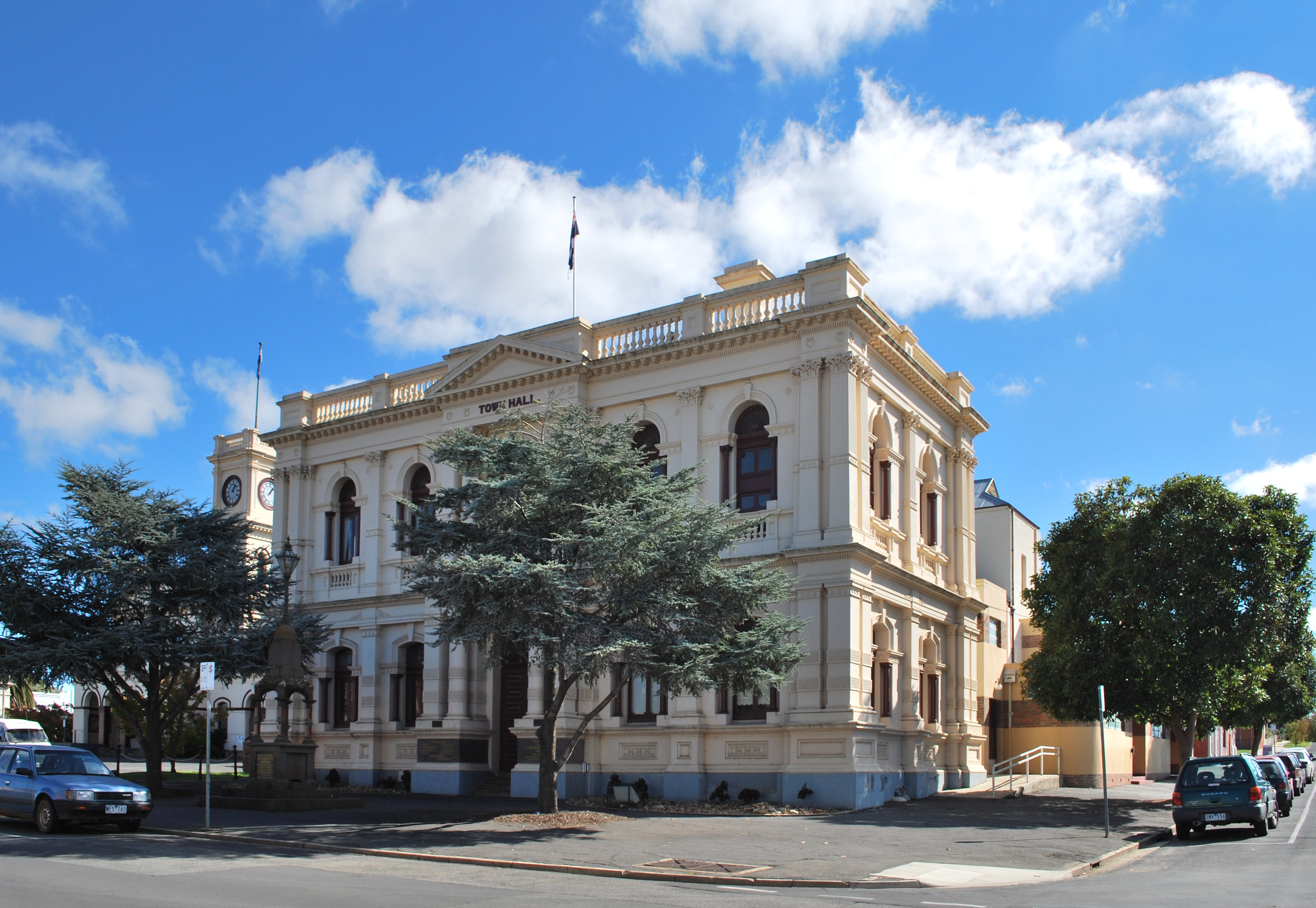
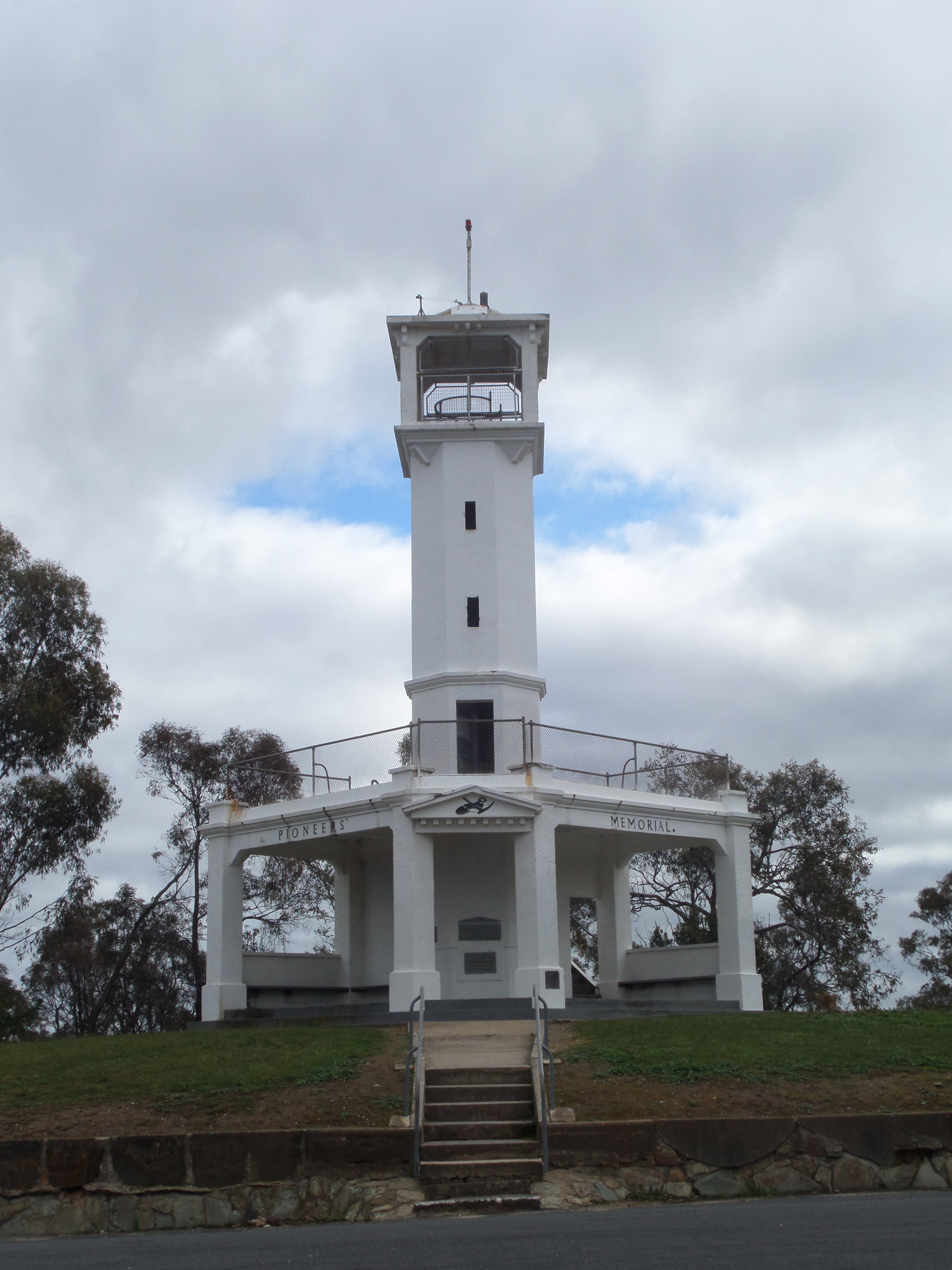
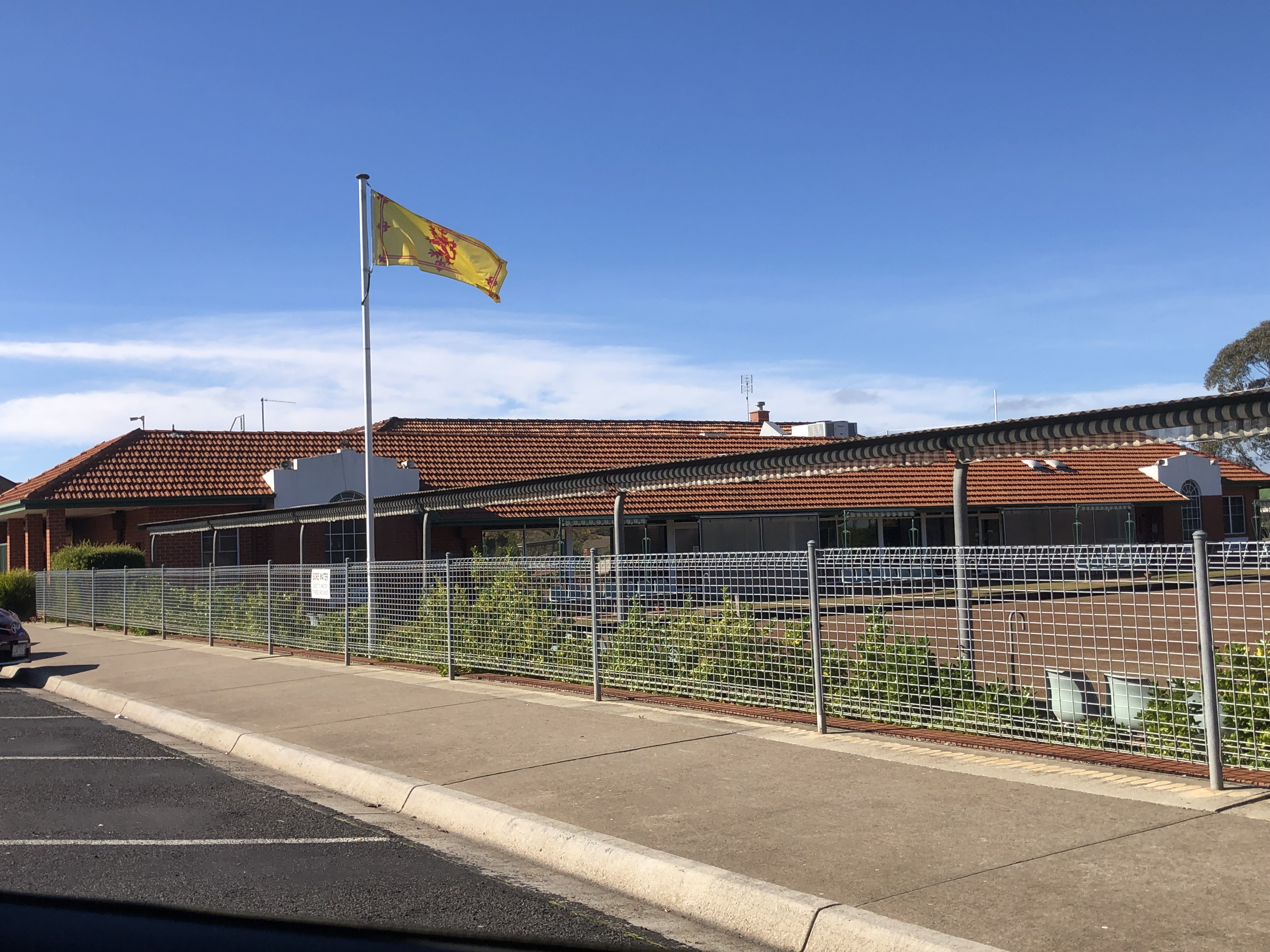
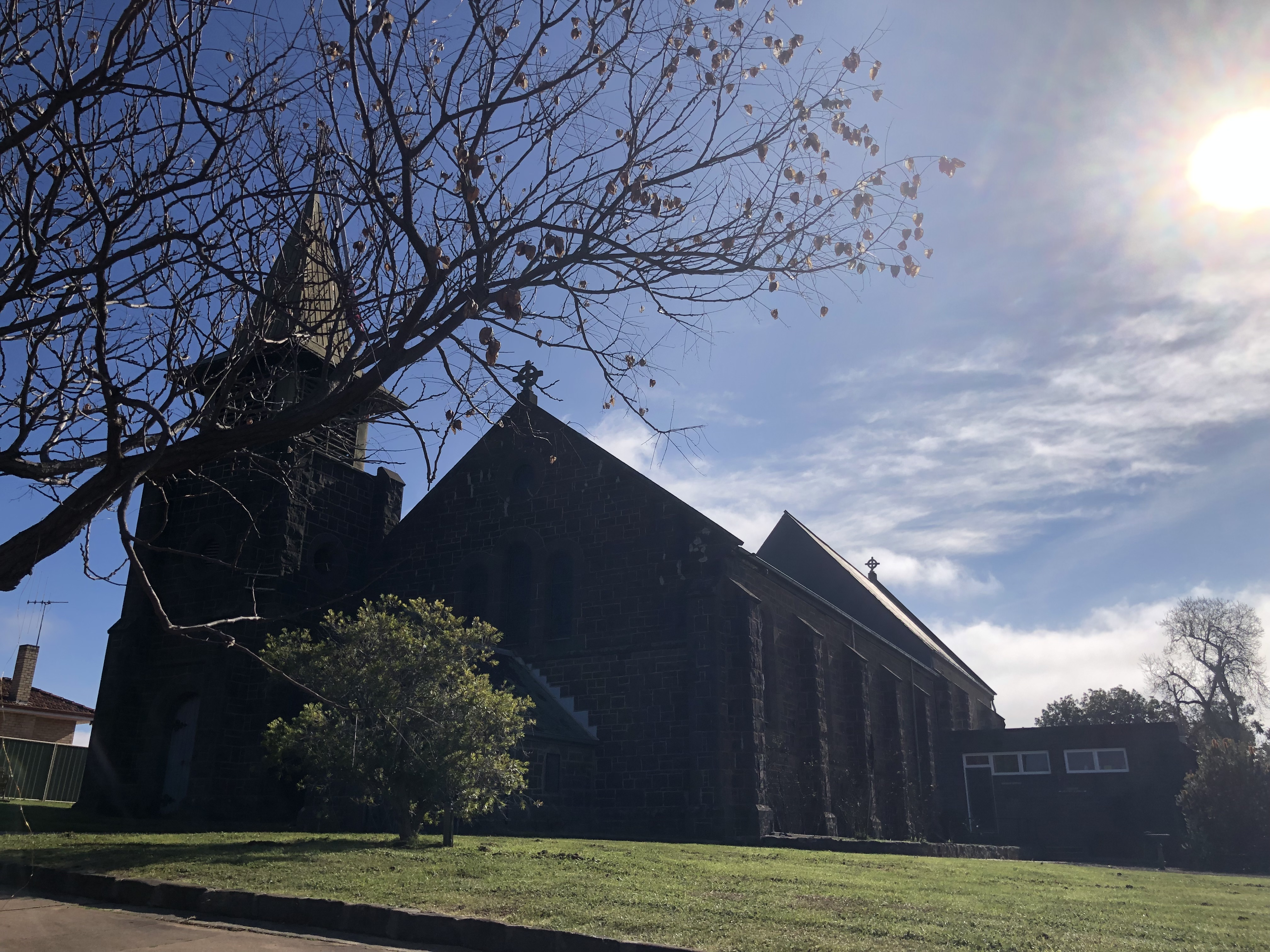
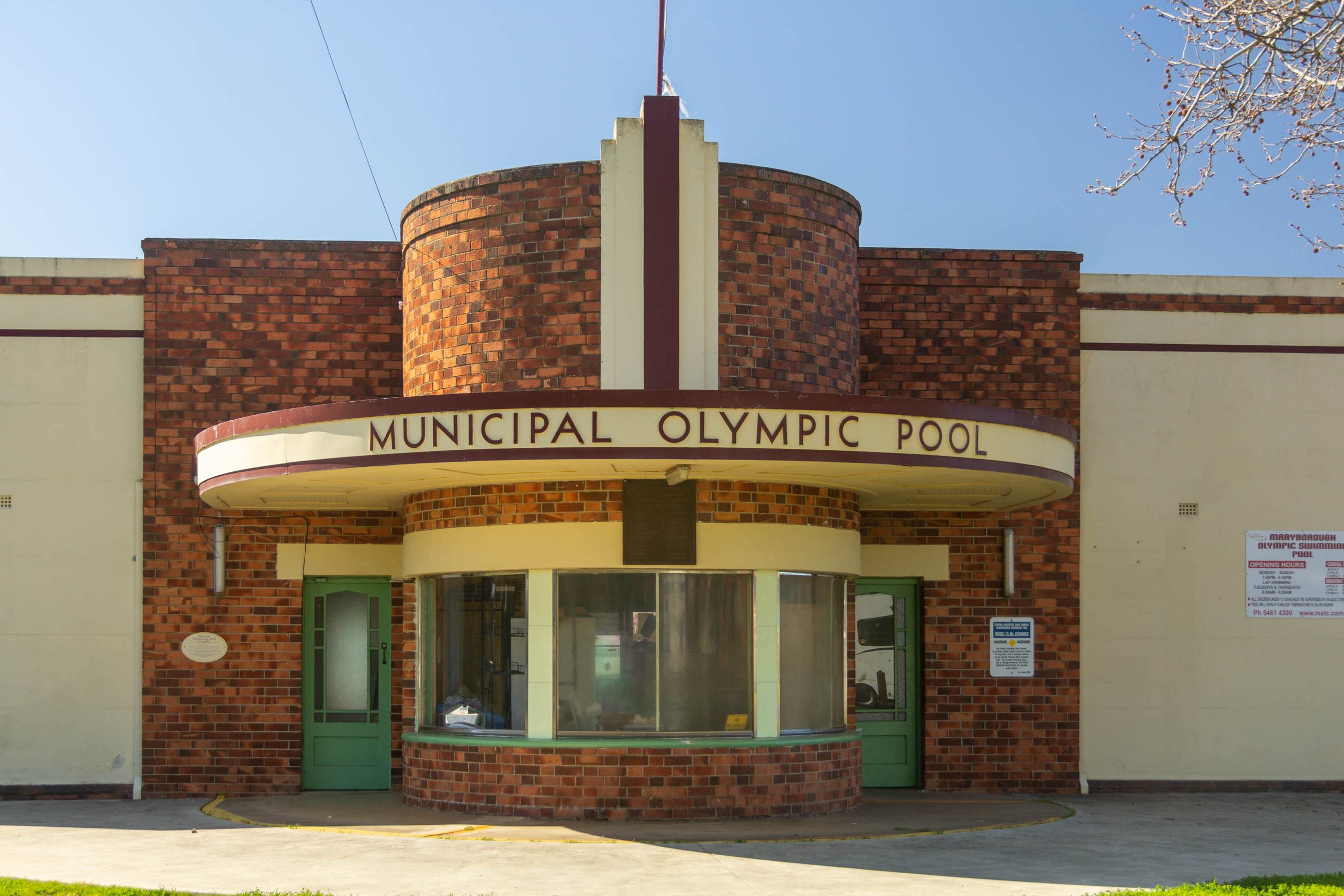
- McLandress Square, with the post office and court house Bull & Mouth Hotel Town Hall Bristol Hill Memorial Tower Highland Society Christ the King Anglican Church Olympic Pool

- Coordinates: 37°03′00″S 143°44′06″E
- Country: Australia
- State: Victoria
- LGA: Shire of Central Goldfields
- Location: 168 km (104 mi) NW of Victoria; 80 km (50 mi) N of Ballarat; 84 km (52 mi) SW of Bendigo; 48 km (30 mi) W of Castlemaine
- Established: 1854

Government
  - State electorate: Ripon
  - Federal division: Mallee
- Elevation: 249 m (817 ft)

Population
  - Total: 7,769 (2021 census)
- Postcode: 3465
- Mean max temp: 20.4 °C (68.7 °F)
- Mean min temp: 8.0 °C (46.4 °F)
- Annual rainfall: 525.7 mm (20.70 in)

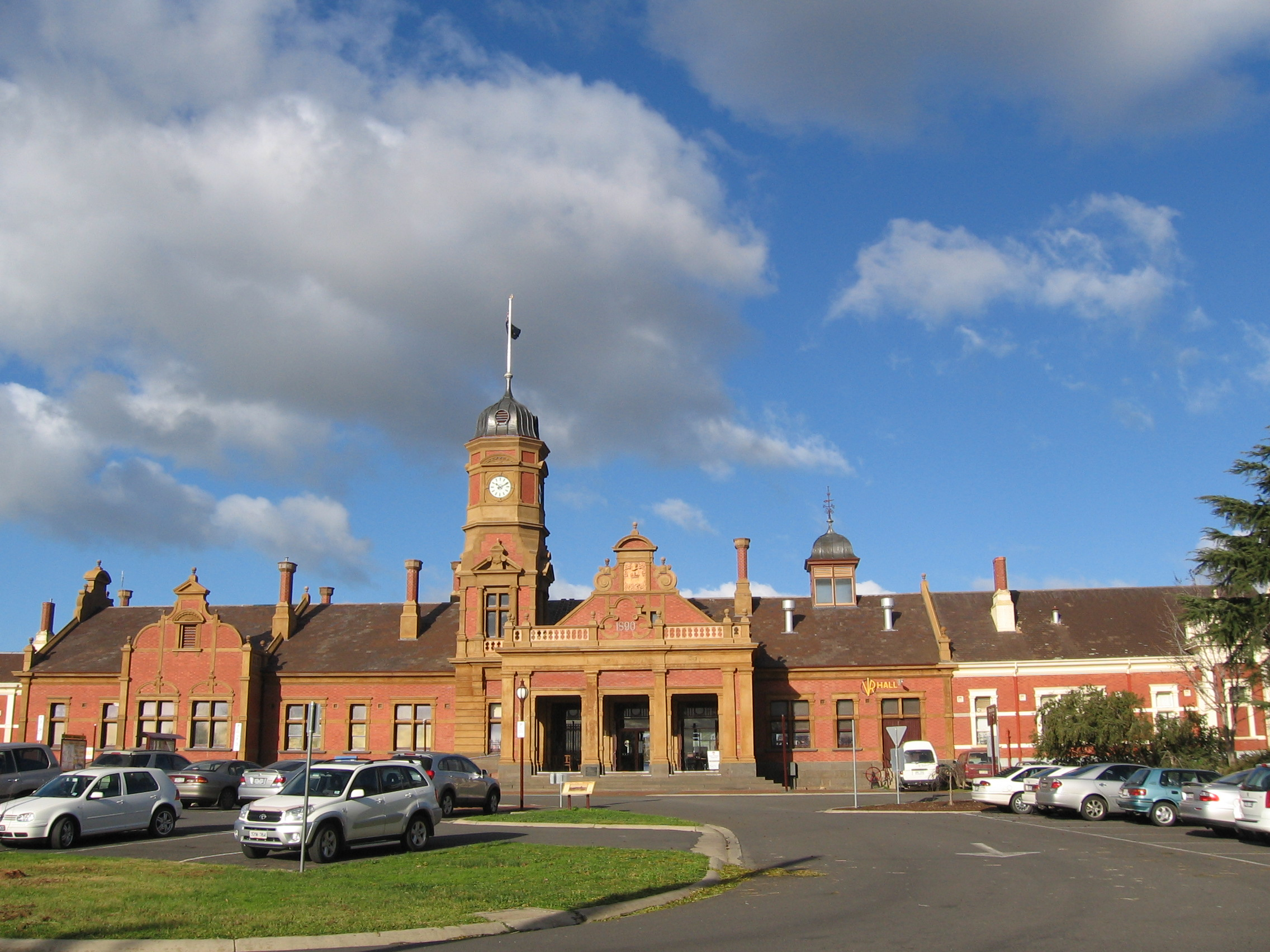
Maryborough railway station was built in 1890, replacing a smaller one built in 1874

Maryborough (/ˈmɛəribərə/) is a town in Victoria, Australia, on the Pyrenees Highway, 58 kilometres (36 mi) north of Ballarat and 168 kilometres (104 mi) northwest of Melbourne, in the Shire of Central Goldfields. At the 2021 census, the urban centre had a population of 7,769, while the larger Level 2 Statistical Area which includes the urban fringe, had a population of 8,160, both an increase of more than 3% since 2016.

== History ==
The area was originally inhabited by the Dja Dja Wurrung people. The first Europeans to settle there were the Simson brothers, who established a sheep station, known as Charlotte Plains, in 1840. In 1854, gold was discovered at White Hill, four kilometres north of Maryborough, attracting a rush of prospectors to the area. At its peak, Maryborough reportedly had a population of up to 50,000. However, the late historian Betty Osborn, of Maryborough-Midlands Historical Society Inc., using a range of contemporary newspapers and government reports, placed the peak population at closer to 30,000.

The town site was surveyed in 1854, with a police camp, Methodist church, and hospital amongst the first infrastructure. The post office opened on 19 October 1854.

The settlement, originally known as Simsons, was renamed Maryborough by gold commissioner James Daly after his County Cork, Ireland birthplace, which still retains that name. One of Victoria's earliest newspapers, The Maryborough Advertiser, was established in 1854. Land sales commenced in 1856, and Maryborough became the area's administrative and commercial centre. It became a Municipal Borough in 1857.

The last gold mine in Maryborough closed in 1918. In 1924 the Maryborough Knitting Mills opened (closed 1996, demolished 2010), manufacturing whitewear (cotton underwear), gradually extending into a wider range of cotton, woollen and artificial fibre garments. The Borough of Maryborough became a City in 1961. In 1995 Maryborough became the administrative centre for the post-local government amalgamations Central Goldfields Shire of Victoria.

== Climate ==
Maryborough enjoys a temperate climate with four distinct seasons and is typically dry and mild. The mean minimum January temperature 12.9 °C (55.2 °F) with the maximum a balmy 28.8 °C (83.8 °F). Temperatures above 35 °C (95 °F) are commonly recorded during the summer months. The highest temperature ever recorded was 45.4 °C (113.7 °F) on 7 February 2009. The mean minimum temperature in July is 3.4 °C (38.1 °F), with and average maximum of 12.2 °C (54.0 °F). The lowest ever recorded minimum in the city was −4.6 °C (23.7 °F) on 21 July 1982. Although the city experiences little snow due to its low elevation, frosts are common during the colder winter months.

The city averages 528.1 millimetres (20.8 in) rainfall annually, with a slightly more rainfall falling in the second half of the year, generally only experienced in short bursts of showers, rather than extended periods of rainfall. The dryness of the area, due to poor topographical features places significant pressure on water reserves. Maryborough ended of one of the longest droughts on record during the 2010/2011 summer when it experience some of the highest rainfall on recorded which caused flooding throughout the local area. The city is currently on permanent water restrictions.

Climate data for Maryborough, elevation 249 m (817 ft), (1991–2020, extremes 1965–present)
Month	Jan	Feb	Mar	Apr	May	Jun	Jul	Aug	Sep	Oct	Nov	Dec	Year
Record high °C (°F)	44.8 (112.6)	45.4 (113.7)	39.5 (103.1)	35.7 (96.3)	27.0 (80.6)	19.7 (67.5)	22.0 (71.6)	25.7 (78.3)	30.7 (87.3)	35.4 (95.7)	40.2 (104.4)	43.9 (111.0)	45.4 (113.7)
Mean daily maximum °C (°F)	29.3 (84.7)	28.9 (84.0)	25.6 (78.1)	21.0 (69.8)	16.4 (61.5)	13.3 (55.9)	12.5 (54.5)	14.0 (57.2)	16.8 (62.2)	20.5 (68.9)	23.9 (75.0)	26.8 (80.2)	20.8 (69.4)
Mean daily minimum °C (°F)	13.7 (56.7)	13.6 (56.5)	11.5 (52.7)	8.3 (46.9)	5.9 (42.6)	4.2 (39.6)	3.5 (38.3)	3.6 (38.5)	5.3 (41.5)	7.3 (45.1)	9.7 (49.5)	11.5 (52.7)	8.2 (46.8)
Record low °C (°F)	3.3 (37.9)	4.9 (40.8)	2.6 (36.7)	0.0 (32.0)	−2.0 (28.4)	−3.8 (25.2)	−4.6 (23.7)	−3.0 (26.6)	−2.6 (27.3)	−0.4 (31.3)	0.3 (32.5)	0.8 (33.4)	−4.6 (23.7)
Average rainfall mm (inches)	39.1 (1.54)	28.2 (1.11)	26.6 (1.05)	31.8 (1.25)	42.0 (1.65)	54.1 (2.13)	52.3 (2.06)	53.5 (2.11)	52.3 (2.06)	40.3 (1.59)	45.3 (1.78)	38.7 (1.52)	504.3 (19.85)
Average rainy days (≥ 1.0 mm)	4.2	3.5	3.6	4.1	6.8	8.3	9.9	9.9	8.9	6.9	5.9	4.9	76.9
Source: Australian Bureau of Meteorology

=== Bushfires ===
Maryborough has been in or around several bushfires, most notably a January 1985 one which killed three people and burned 180 homes.

== Demographics ==
At the 2021 census, 7,769 people resided in Maryborough. Like many regional centres, a high percentage of the population (84.3%) was born in Australia, followed by England (2.9%), New Zealand (0.7%) and the Philippines (0.7%).

Technicians, trade workers and labourers are the bulk (32.6%) of the workforce. Professionals, salespeople and managers make up other large portions of the employment base.

== Churches ==
Just over 16% of the people describe themselves as Catholic and 44.3% claim no religious affiliation. Other Christian groups include Anglicans and the Uniting Church.

== Education ==
Maryborough has three schools:

- Highview College: Year 7-12
- Maryborough Education Centre: Prep–12 and specialist
- St Augustine's Primary School Grades: Prep–6

== Culture ==
The town hosts a market on the first Sunday of each month, a Highland Gathering on New Year's Day (which has been held since 1857).

Maryborough plays host to the Energy Breakthrough in which thousands of students, teachers, parents and spectators from around Australia come to the town to witness a Human Powered Vehicle race where teams can complete up to 888 kilometres (552 mi) in 24 hours.

== Music ==
Maryborough has a number of community bands including the Maryborough City Brass Band, the Maryborough Big Band, the Maryborough and District Pipe Band and the well-known Maryborough Traditional Jazz Ensemble.

Three founding members of electronic music group The Avalanches, Robbie Chater, Tony Di Blasi and Gordon McQuilten, first met in Maryborough as school students. Their four studio albums, Since I Left You (2000), Wildflower (2016), We Will Always Love You (2020), and No Bad Memories (2026) have received critical acclaim and commercial success internationally.

== Media ==
The Maryborough Advertiser is the local newspaper in the Central Goldfields region, circulating to over 4000 homes. The 'Addy', as it's known locally, employs 13 local people. It is published every Tuesday and Friday. In 2015–2016 The Maryborough and District Advertiser celebrated 160 years as the printed voice of the community.

Maryborough receives all the major free-to-air television stations (ABC, SBS, Seven, WIN and Network 10), as well as all new digital channels (ABC Family, ABC Kids, ABC Entertains, ABC News, SBS2, SBS Food, SBS World Movies, SBS WorldWatch, NITV, 10 Drama, 10 Comedy, Nickelodeon, 9Go!, 9Gem, 9Life, 7two, 7mate, 7flix and 7Bravo). WIN are the regional affiliate of the Nine Network, and re-broadcast their network signals. There are slight differences, as Seven and WIN each broadcast their own local news bulletins from the Bendigo or Ballarat stations. WIN stations also opt out for local news and programs that airs with their own logos — at a different scale than the Nine logos.

The pay television service Foxtel has been available to the residents of Maryborough since 2012; pay television was previously available in the Maryborough district via satellite on the Austar network, beginning in the 1990s.

In early February 2007 radio transmission of Goldfields FM 99.1 commenced.

== Sport ==
The town has an Australian Rules football team (the Maryborough Football Club) competing in the major Bendigo Football League until 2024, however they have been in recess since 2025. The Maryborough Giants formed in 2023 as a merged club from the Maryborough Rovers and Royal park, and compete in the Maryborough Castlemaine District Football League.

Maryborough has a soccer club, with local teams competing in Under 9, Under 13, and Under 17 competitions, and a senior team that competes in the Ballarat & District Soccer Association. Social and competitive futsal competitions are held throughout the year.

Maryborough Harness Racing Club conducts regular meetings at its racetrack located at nearby Carisbrook.

Golfers play at the course of the Maryborough Golf Club on Park Road.

There are three cricket clubs in Maryborough. The Colts Phelans Cricket Club, the M.K.M. Cricket Club, and the Maryborough Cricket all compete in the Maryborough District Cricket Association.

Maryborough, after years of having a strong competition in grass hockey, folded in 2013, leaving them with only the one team competing in the B women level in the Hockey Central Vic in Bendigo. Maryborough were premiers 2011 and 2012.

In basketball, the Maryborough Blazers compete in the Country Basketball League North East league, with a team in both the men's and women's competitions. Australian NBA athlete, Matthew Dellavedova who played for the Cleveland Cavaliers, Milwaukee Bucks and Sacramento Kings, grew up in Maryborough.

The Maryborough & District Triathlon Club support triathlon and other multisport events in the region.

== Notable people ==
- Phillip Adams – Australian farmer, broadcaster, and public intellectual
- Jed Adcock – professional footballer in the Australian Football League (AFL) for the Brisbane Lions
- Ron Branton – professional footballer as player and captain in the VFL for Richmond Football Club
- Karl Chandler – comedian, podcaster, comedy writer
- Troy Chaplin – professional footballer in the AFL for the Richmond Tigers
- Stewart Crameri – professional footballer in the AFL for Essendon Football Club, Western Bulldogs and Geelong Cats
- Matthew Dellavedova – professional basketball player in the National Basketball Association (NBA) for the Sacramento Kings, 2016 NBA Champion with the Cleveland Cavaliers
- Charles Web Gilbert – internationally known sculptor
- Edmund Herring – Lieutenant General in the Second Australian Imperial Force, Chief Justice of Victoria, and Lieutenant Governor of Victoria
- John Nicholls – professional footballer as player and captain in the AFL for Carlton Football Club
- Alfred Richard Outtrim – politician in the Parliament of Victoria from 1895 to 1920
- Lauren Butler – professional footballer in the AFL Women's (AFL) for the Collingwood Magpies

== Cemetery ==
The cemetery is on Wright Street.

== Infrastructure ==
=== Transport ===
Maryborough is connected to both Ararat and Elphinstone via the Pyrenees Highway, with connections to the capital Melbourne and Northern Victoria and beyond.

Maryborough station is located on the Mildura railway line. In 2007 the station underwent a $1.2 million upgrade to conduct vital repairs to the historic bell tower, clock and roof which was built in 1890.

In 1895 American writer Mark Twain visited the town and remarked about the station upon his visit.

Don't you overlook that Maryborough station, if you take an interest in governmental curiosities. Why, you can put the whole population of Maryborough into it, and give them a sofa apiece, and have room for more. You haven't fifteen stations in America that are as big, and you probably haven't five that are half as fine. Why, it's perfectly elegant. And the clock! Everybody will show you the clock. There isn't a station in Europe that's got such a clock. It doesn't strike—and that's one mercy. It hasn't any bell; and as you'll have cause to remember, if you keep your reason, all Australia is simply bedamned with bells.

Daily train services to and from Ballarat, with onward connections to Melbourne's Southern Cross station commenced in 2010.

The Avoca railway line is to be reopened (as of 2017) ultimately to connect Mildura with Portland with standard gauge track.

The city also has coach and bus services that connect to various parts of the city with connections to Melbourne and other parts of Victoria.

The local library was fitted with a 30 kW solar system in late 2012.

== See also ==
- Maryborough Airport
- Energy Breakthrough
- Maryborough, Queensland
- Maryborough meteorite
