= List of places of worship in Moorabool Shire =

This is a list of places of worship in the Shire of Moorabool, a local government area in the state of Victoria, Australia. The list includes active and former churches and other religious buildings representing a variety of Christian denominations and other faiths.

St John's Anglican Church, Ballan

== Heritage listing status ==
Style	Status
Yes	Listed on the Victorian Heritage Register
–	Not listed

== Current places of worship ==
Current places of worship
Name	Image	Location	Denomination/ Affiliation	Heritage listing	Notes	Refs
St Patrick's Catholic Church, Gordon		Gordon; 37.580224°S 144.092652°E	Catholic			
St John's Anglican Church, Ballan		Ballan; 37.598608°S 144.227692°E	Anglican			
St Paul's Uniting Church, Ballan		Ballan; 37.600427°S 144.232849°E	Uniting (formerly Presbyterian)			
St Brigid's Catholic Church, Ballan		Ballan; 37.599741°S 144.228872°E	Catholic			
St Peter's Catholic Church, Clarkes Hill		Clarkes Hill; 37.484599°S 143.976030°E	Catholic			
Our Lady Ta' Pinu Shrine		Merrimu; 37.683160°S 144.483365°E	Catholic			
Holy Trinity Anglican Church, Bacchus Marsh		Bacchus Marsh; 37.673185°S 144.436054°E	Anglican			
St Bernard's Catholic Church, Bacchus Marsh		Bacchus Marsh; 37.673531°S 144.443078°E	Catholic			
St Andrew's Uniting Church, Bacchus Marsh		Bacchus Marsh; 37.673408°S 144.436655°E	Uniting (formerly Presbyterian)			
Bacchus Marsh Christian Church		Bacchus Marsh; 37.676278°S 144.442495°E	Non-denominational			
St Michael's Catholic Church, Springbank		Springbank; 37.532215°S 144.053454°E	Catholic			
St John's Anglican Church, Bungaree		Bungaree; 37.557354°S 144.002469°E	Anglican			
St Michael's Catholic Church, Bungaree		Bungaree; 37.559485°S 143.988414°E	Catholic			
St Malachy's Catholic Church, Blackwood		Blackwood; 37.471355°S 144.308200°E	Catholic			
Blackwood Uniting Church (St Martin's Chapel)		Blackwood; 37.471453°S 144.307224°E	Uniting (formerly Presbyterian)			
St Brendan's Catholic Church, Dunnstown		Dunnstown; 37.591326°S 143.966091°E	Catholic			
Our Lady Help of Christians Catholic Church		Korobeit; 37.586207°S 144.336789°E	Catholic			
St Sava Serbian Orthodox Monastery		Elaine; 37.782233°S 143.983061°E	Serbian Orthodox			
St James' Anglican Church, Morrisons		Morrisons; 37.779318°S 144.099795°E	Anglican			
Christ Church, Myrniong		Myrniong; 37.618417°S 144.344823°E	Anglican			
Bacchus Marsh Kingdom Hall of Jehovah's Witnesses		Darley; 37.662309°S 144.438369°E	Jehovah's Witnesses			
Bacchus Marsh Baptist Church (Catalyst Baptist Church)		Darley; 37.662780°S 144.437577°E	Baptist			
Our Lady the Merciful Greek Orthodox Church		Merrimu; 37.655498°S 144.462405°E	Greek Orthodox			
Melbourne Karen Buddhist Association		Mount Wallace; 37.757350°S 144.221202°E	Buddhist			

== Former places of worship ==
Former places of worship
Name	Image	Location	Denomination/ Affiliation	Heritage listing	Notes	Refs
St Mark's Anglican Church, Gordon		Gordon; 37.579961°S 144.099413°E	Anglican			
Scotsburn Union Church		Scotsburn; 37.669326°S 143.929888°E	Union (Anglican and Uniting)			
Mount Egerton Uniting Church		Mount Egerton; 37.624192°S 144.102788°E	Uniting (formerly Presbyterian)			
St Laurence O'Toole's Catholic Church		Merrimu; 37.684124°S 144.485000°E	Catholic			
Holy Trinity Anglican Church, Greendale		Greendale; 37.562229°S 144.300349°E	Anglican			
St Patrick's Catholic Church, Elaine		Elaine; 37.776903°S 144.029045°E	Catholic			
Pentland Hills Uniting Church		Myrniong; 37.623242°S 144.357051°E	Uniting (formerly Presbyterian)			
St Mary's Catholic Church, Clarendon		Clarendon; 37.696757°S 143.975963°E	Catholic			
All Saints' Anglican Church, Blackwood		Blackwood; 37.472333°S 144.308435°E	Anglican			

== See also ==
- List of places of worship in the City of Ballarat
- List of places of worship in Hepburn Shire
- List of places of worship in the City of Greater Geelong
- List of places of worship in Golden Plains Shire
- List of places of worship in Macedon Ranges Shire
