= Lal Lal =

- Town
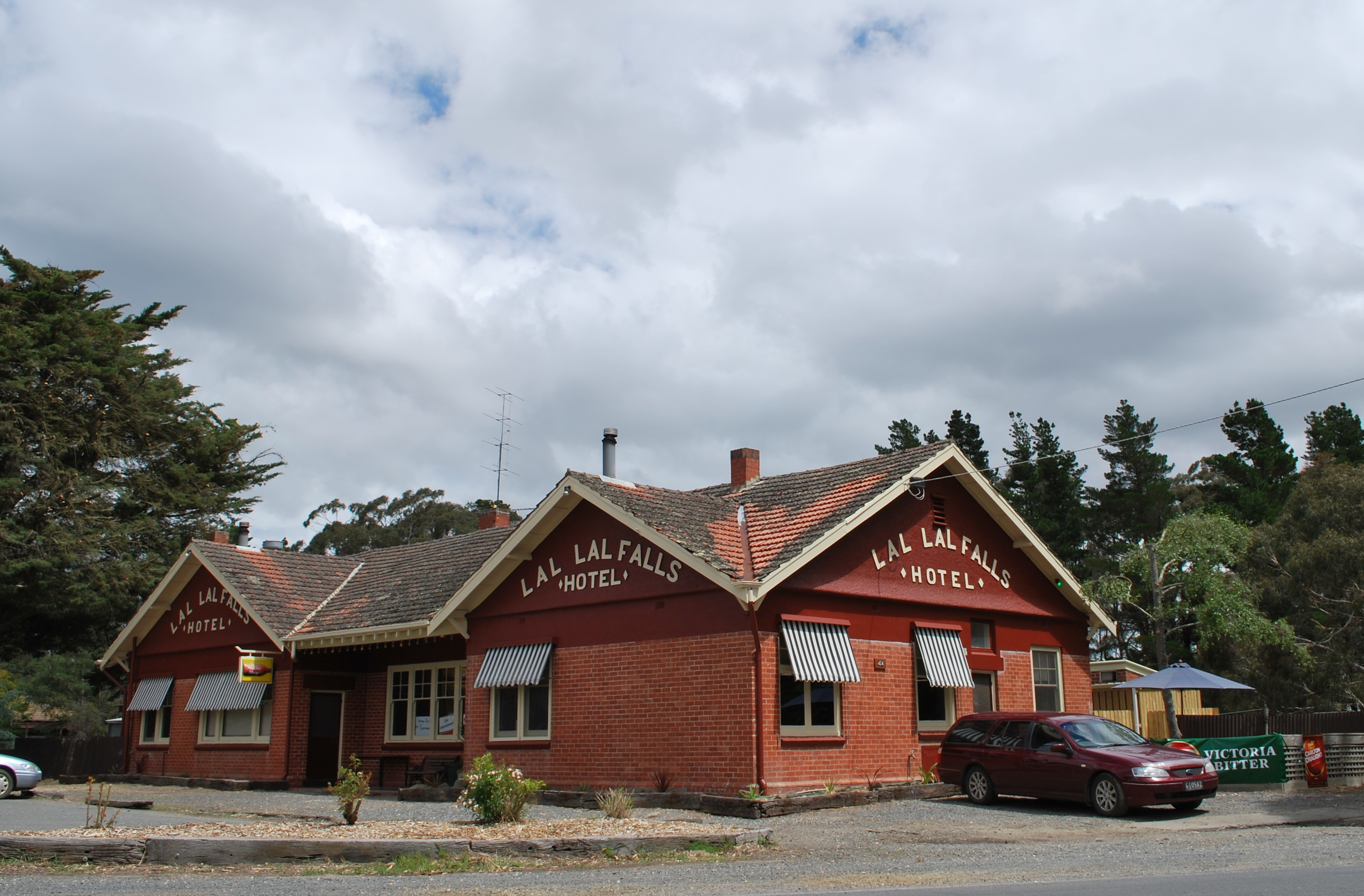
- Lal Lal Falls Hotel

- Coordinates: 37°40′31″S 144°00′47″E
- Country: Australia
- State: Victoria
- LGA: Shire of Moorabool
- Location: 11 km (6.8 mi) N of Elaine; 23 km (14 mi) SE of Ballarat; 108 km (67 mi) W of Melbourne

Government
  - State electorate: Eureka
  - Federal division: Ballarat

Population
  - Total: 476 (2016 census)
- Postcode: 3352
Localities around Lal Lal
Dunnstown and Yendon	Millbrook	Mount Egerton
Scotsburn	Lal Lal	Bungal
Clarendon	Mount Doran	Elaine

Lal Lal is a town in Victoria (Australia), Australia. The town is located in the Shire of Moorabool and on the Geelong-Ballarat railway line, 108 kilometres (67 mi) west of the state capital, Melbourne. At the 2016 census, Lal Lal and the surrounding area had a population of 476.

Lal Lal Falls and the Lal Lal Reservoir on the Moorabool River are to the north-east and east of the town.

== History ==
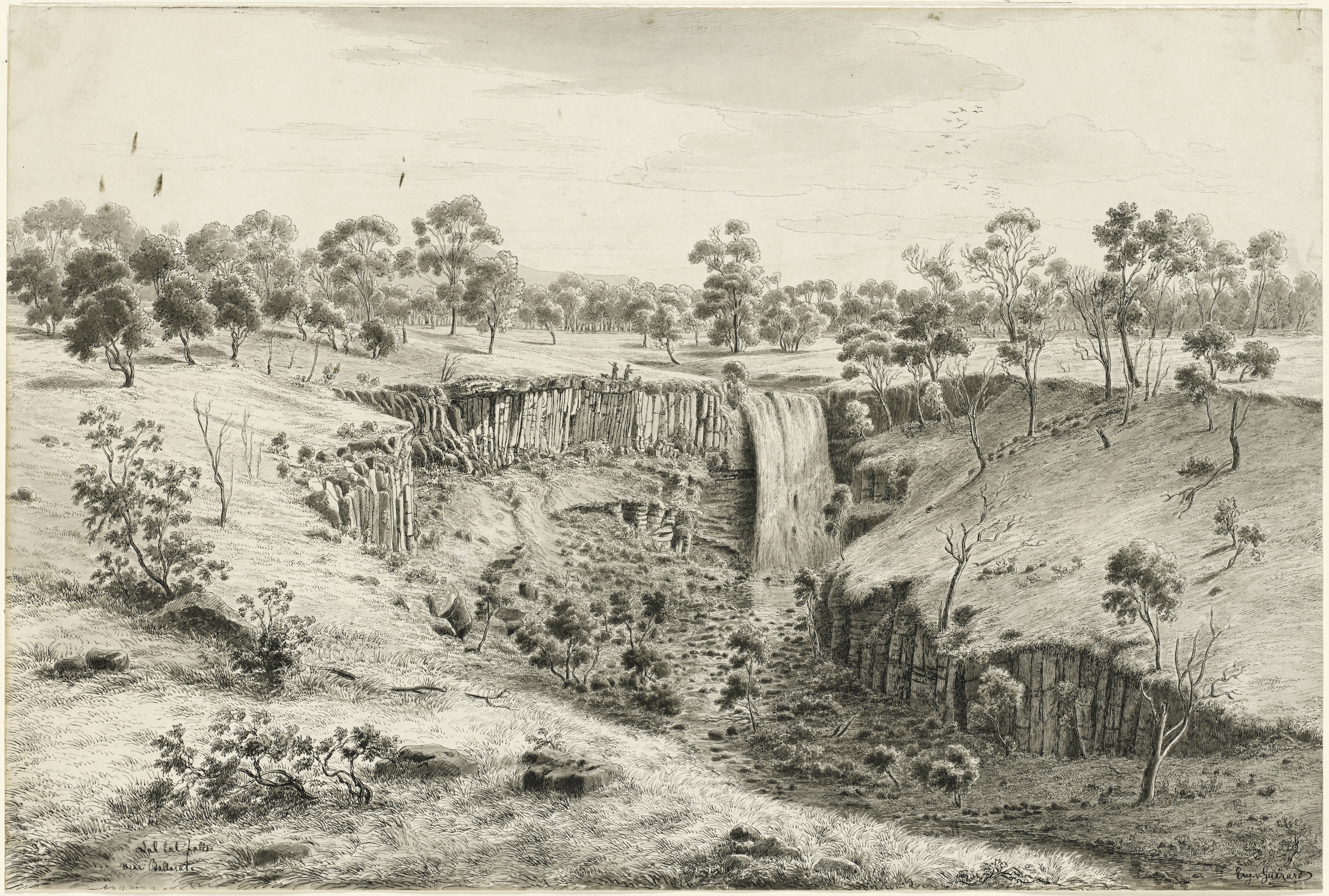
Lal Lal Falls near Ballarat, Victoria, 1859-63

The original settlement at Lal Lal was part of a substantial sheep run dating from 1845. The township became more firmly established after the mining of iron ore, lignite, kaolin (clay) and gold began in the area.

The railway arrived at Lal Lal in April 1862 and Lal Lal Post Office opened on 18 July 1863 (closing in 1969).

=== Heritage listed sites ===
Lal Lal contains a number of heritage listed sites, including:

- Iron Mine Road, Lal Lal Iron Mine and Smelting Works
- 389 Yendon-Lal Lal Road, Rothbury

== See also ==
- List of reduplicated Australian place names
