= Bandt (surname) =

Bandt is a surname. It most commonly refers to Adam Bandt (born 1972), an Australian politician and industrial lawyer who was the leader of the Australian Greens (2020–2025).

Other notable people with the surname include:

- Jean-Pierre De Bandt (born 1934), Belgian lawyer and former President of the Coudenberg group
- Lewis Bandt (1910–1987), Australian car designer
- Ros Bandt (born 1951), Australian composer, sound artist, academic, and performer
