= Trentham Falls =

Waterfall in Victoria, Australia

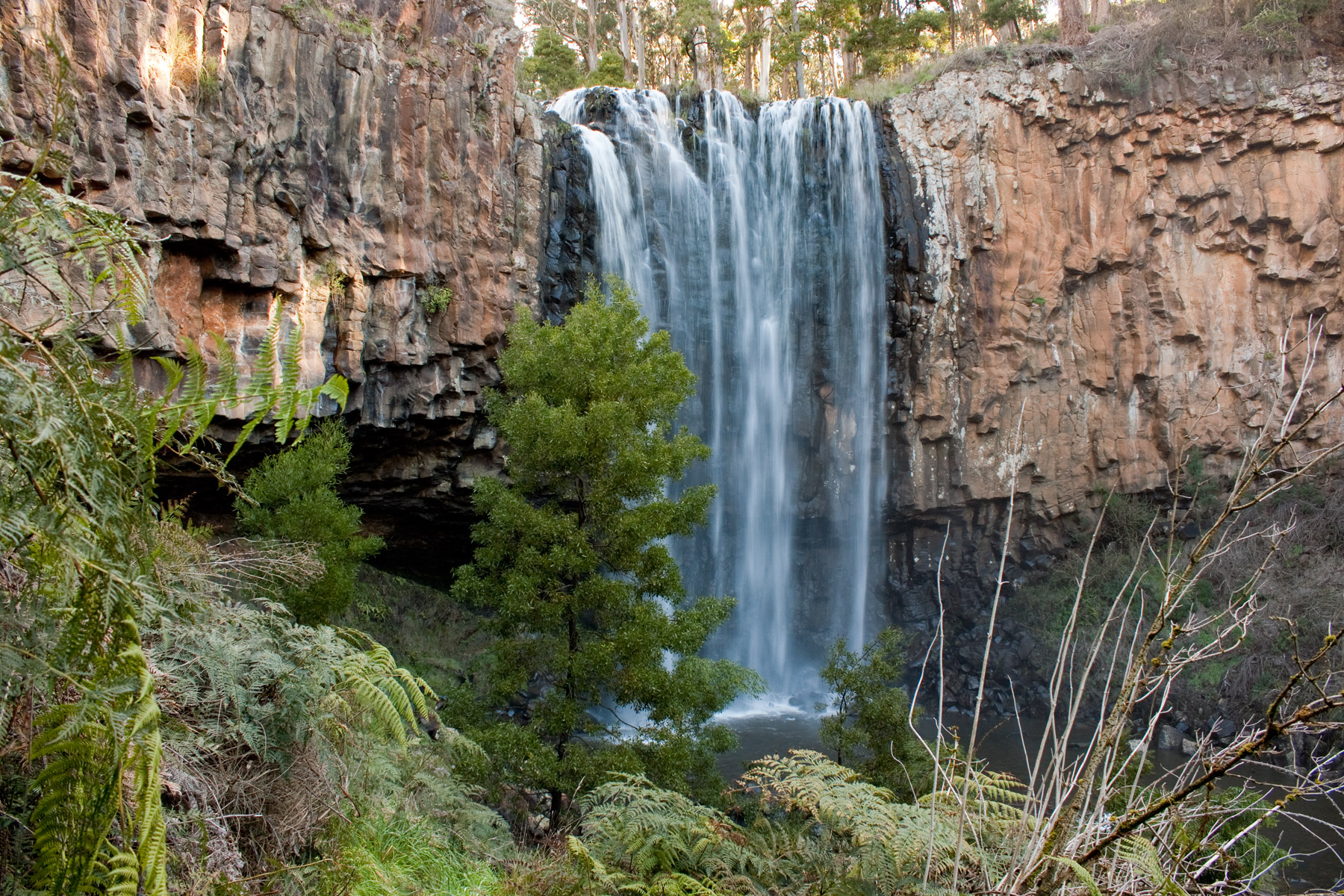
- Trentham Falls

- Location within Victoria
- Location: Trentham, Victoria, Australia
- Coordinates: 37°22′12″S 144°19′28″E
- Type: Plunge
- Total height: 32 m (105 ft)
- Number of drops: 1
- Watercourse: Coliban River

Trentham Falls is a waterfall located adjacent to the town of Trentham, Victoria, Australia. At a height of 32 metres, the waterfall is the largest single-drop waterfall in central Victoria. The falls are situated within the Coliban River Scenic Reserve, which is managed by Parks Victoria.

== History ==
The first Europeans to discover the waterfall were most likely prospectors and timber splitters, who arrived in the area in the 1850s. It was during this time that a prospector attempted to bore holes in the rockface in order to blast and alter the rock face. The prospector did not go ahead with the blasting. A small cutting was incised at the top of the waterfall, where a water wheel was placed in order to control the water and search for gold. However, gold was not found and it was promptly removed. A large block of rock in the plunge pool beneath the waterfall was removed for the waterwheel.

On 28 April 1990, roughly 400 kilograms of basalt rock fell 7 metres off of the cliff face, breaking upon impact. No one was injured.

== Geology ==
The formation of the waterfalls is a result of a columnar basalt flow which occurred 5 million years ago, originating from a volcano near Newbury. As the lava cooled slowly, vertical cracking within the rock ensued, creating the present columnar structure. Beneath the waterfall is the ancient river, composed of Ordovician slates and sandstones, and other marine sediments over 500 million years old. Remains of timber (reduced to ash as a result of contact with lava), and a platypus skull have been discovered in the sediment. The cave-like undercutting formed as a result of backspray from the water hitting the plunge pool. On parts of the cliffs surrounding the waterfalls, rocks have dislodged due to glacial thaw and freeze, occurring over 12,000 years ago.

== See also ==
- Dyers Falls
- Lal Lal Falls
- Buckley Falls
