= Elaine, Victoria =

Elaine
- Town
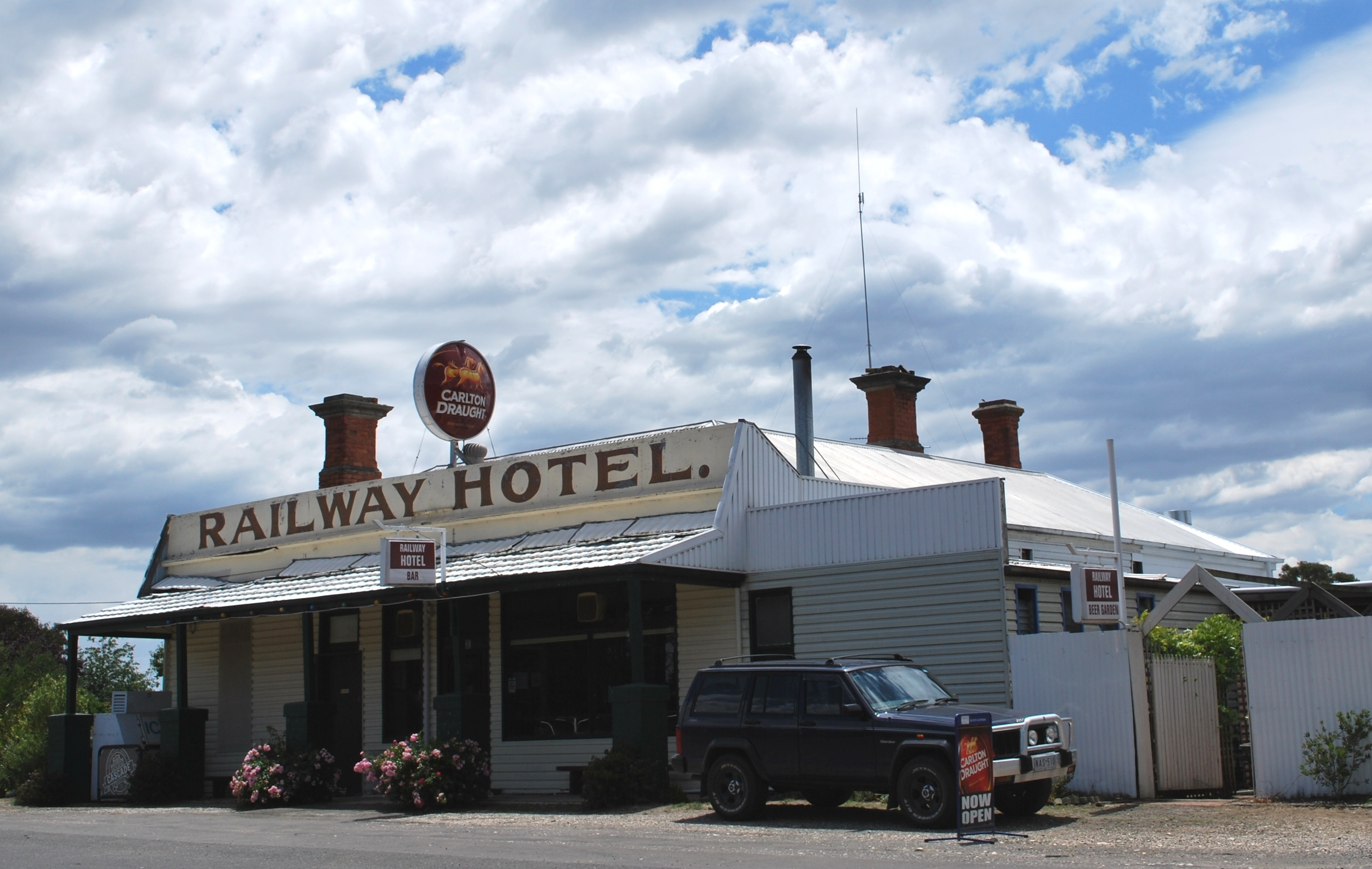
- Railway Hotel, 2008

- Coordinates: 37°46′S 144°01′E
- Country: Australia
- State: Victoria
- LGA: Shire of Moorabool
- Location: 28 km (17 mi) SE of Ballarat; 42 km (26 mi) NW of Geelong; 82 km (51 mi) W of Melbourne

Government
  - State electorate: Eureka
  - Federal division: Ballarat

Population
  - Total: 228 (2016 census)
- Postcode: 3334
Localities around Elaine
Scotsburn; Clarendon	Lal Lal	Mount Doran; Bungal
Grenville	Elaine	Morrisons
Cargerie	Meredith	Meredith

Elaine is a town in Victoria, Australia, located on the Midland Highway between Ballarat and Geelong. At the 2021 census, Elaine and the surrounding area had a population of 232.

== History ==
Elaine started out a minor gold rush district. Since the Steiglitz goldfield had been discovered in 1854, gold mining had occurred in the area, then known as Stony Rises.

The Geelong–Ballarat railway line was opened on 11 April 1862 and passed through the settlement, but the railway station was only opened a decade later, officially establishing Elaine as the name of the township. (Note: According to the records of the Department of Transport, Planning and Local Infrastructure, Elaine was named after Elaine of Astolat, the subject of Alfred Tennyson's poem The Lady of Shalott. That is supported by contemporary news reports about the town, and by the Victorian Railways in its 1918 publication Names of Victorian Railway Stations. Some locals, in common with those in nearby Meredith and Maude, make the fanciful claim that the place was named after the madam of the town brothel.) The later opening of the station meant that Elaine was not provided with a grand bluestone station like the original ones on the line.

At the time, Catholics and Free Presbyterians were the two main communities. A Catholic school opened in 1874, and a state primary school was opened the following year.

The railway line was singled in 1934. The station was closed to passengers in 1978 and closed completely in 1983. Now only grain and other freight trains travel on the line, and do not stop at Elaine. The Catholic school closed in the 1940s. The state school was closed in 1998 after attendance dwindled to only twelve students, and community involvement declined. The football and tennis clubs folded soon after, and facilities at the recreation reserve fell into disrepair. Families began to leave the town.

In 2010, after a small government grant was received to build a barbecue area at the reserve, residents were motivated to hold a meeting and see if they could revive the tennis club. The community helped raise funds and, within six months, the club had three junior teams and 35 sponsors. Children also came to play from nearby towns such as Meredith. The club's success led to the introduction of Auskick and the revival of the cricket club.

== Townscape ==
Elaine is located in the Shire of Moorabool, a local government area of Victoria. Surrounded by farmland, the town is on the Midland Highway, between Ballarat and Geelong.

The Railway Hotel is at 5280 Midland Highway. The building was constructed in 1874, with the railway station having been recently opened across the road, served by regular passenger trains travelling between Geelong and Ballarat. Allegedly, the hotel was also used as a brothel. In December 1922, publican Henry Gray was put on trial for fatally shooting drunken customer Michael Fahey, who had attacked him with an axe, but was acquitted. Locals, including the current publican, Bevley Townsend, say that a murdered 19th-century miner, Lenny, has been reincarnated as the hotel's resident poltergeist. The railway station that was opposite the hotel has long been gone. (Note: A post office opened on 1 March 1859 as Mount Doran. It was renamed Elaine in 1872. A separate establishment, Elaine Railway Station Post Office, opened on 13 April 1873, eleven days after the station. In 1877, Elaine Post Office reverted to Mount Doran and the one at the railway station was renamed to Elaine.)

The Elaine Farmacy, a general store; and the Farmgate Shop, a farm shop recognised for its potatoes, are also situated on the Midland Highway. The Farmgate's owner, Mark Dunne, said that the site was one of the first titles registered in Elaine on the route of Cobb & Co.'s Geelong–Ballarat coach service. Elaine Recreation Reserve hosts the town's sporting clubs and facilities. There is also a public hall.

As of 2014, Elaine had two churches. There is also a Serbian Orthodox monastery and associated cemetery, which was home to five monks and two nuns in 2010.

== Demographics ==
Elaine had a population of 427 in the 1881 census and 434 in the 1911 census, but the number decreased in the following decades, with 184 in 1947 and 219 in 1961.
