= Lewis Bandt =

Australian car designer

Lewis Thornet Bandt (26 February 1910 – 18 March 1987) was an Australian car designer, most famous for designing and building the first ute (coupé utility) cars in the 1930s.

== Early life ==
Bandt was born the eldest of five children in the South Australian town of Moonta. The family moved to Adelaide after World War I, and in 1924 he began a fitting and turning apprenticeship with Duncan & Fraser Ltd who specialised in modifying Model T Fords.

He moved to Victoria in 1927 and worked for the Melbourne Motor Body & Assembling Company. In 1929 he moved to the Ford factory in Geelong as the subsidiary's first designer.

== Ute design ==
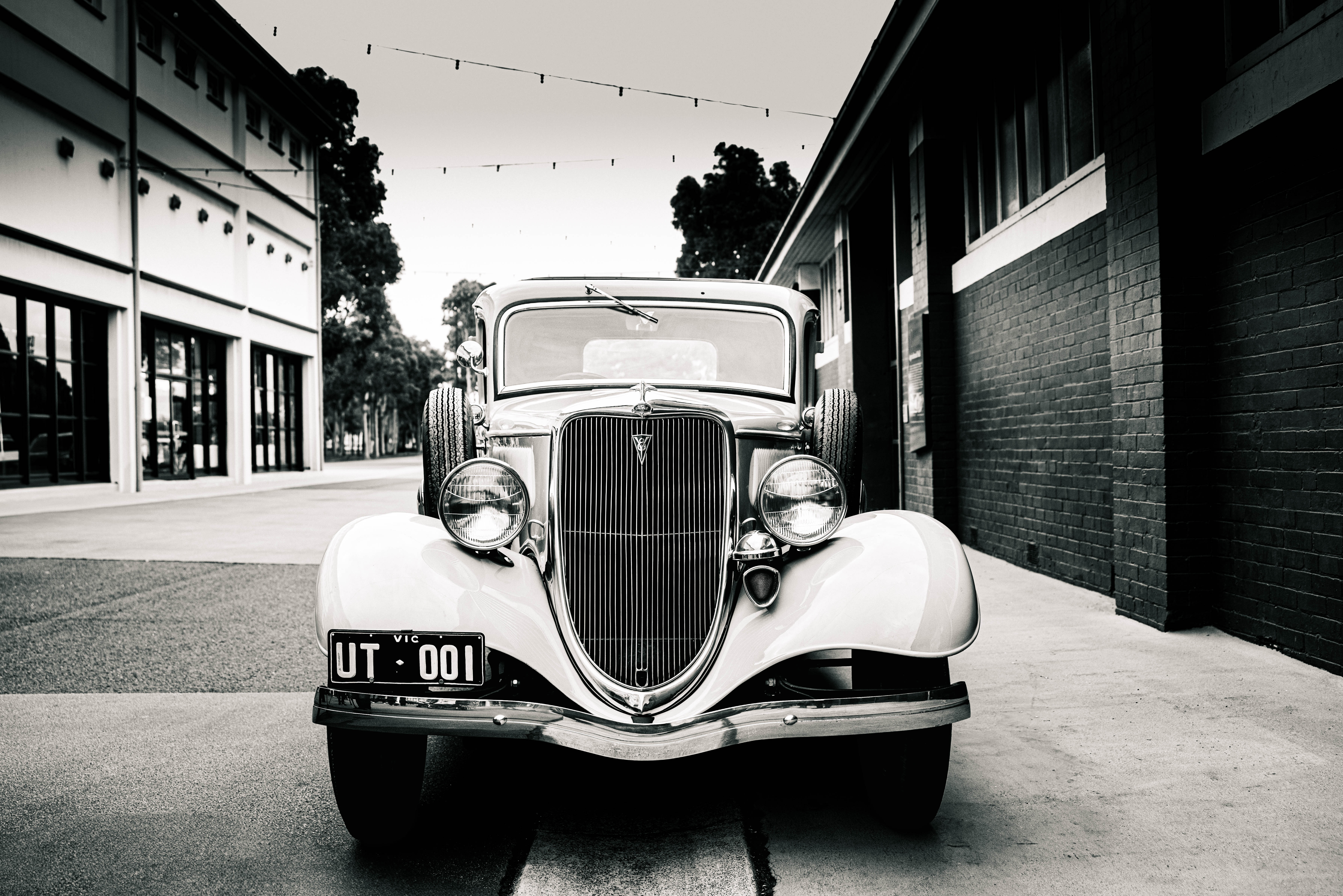
Ford Ute, front profile, as seen 4th April 2025 at Fords 100th Anniversary at the Melbourne Show Grounds

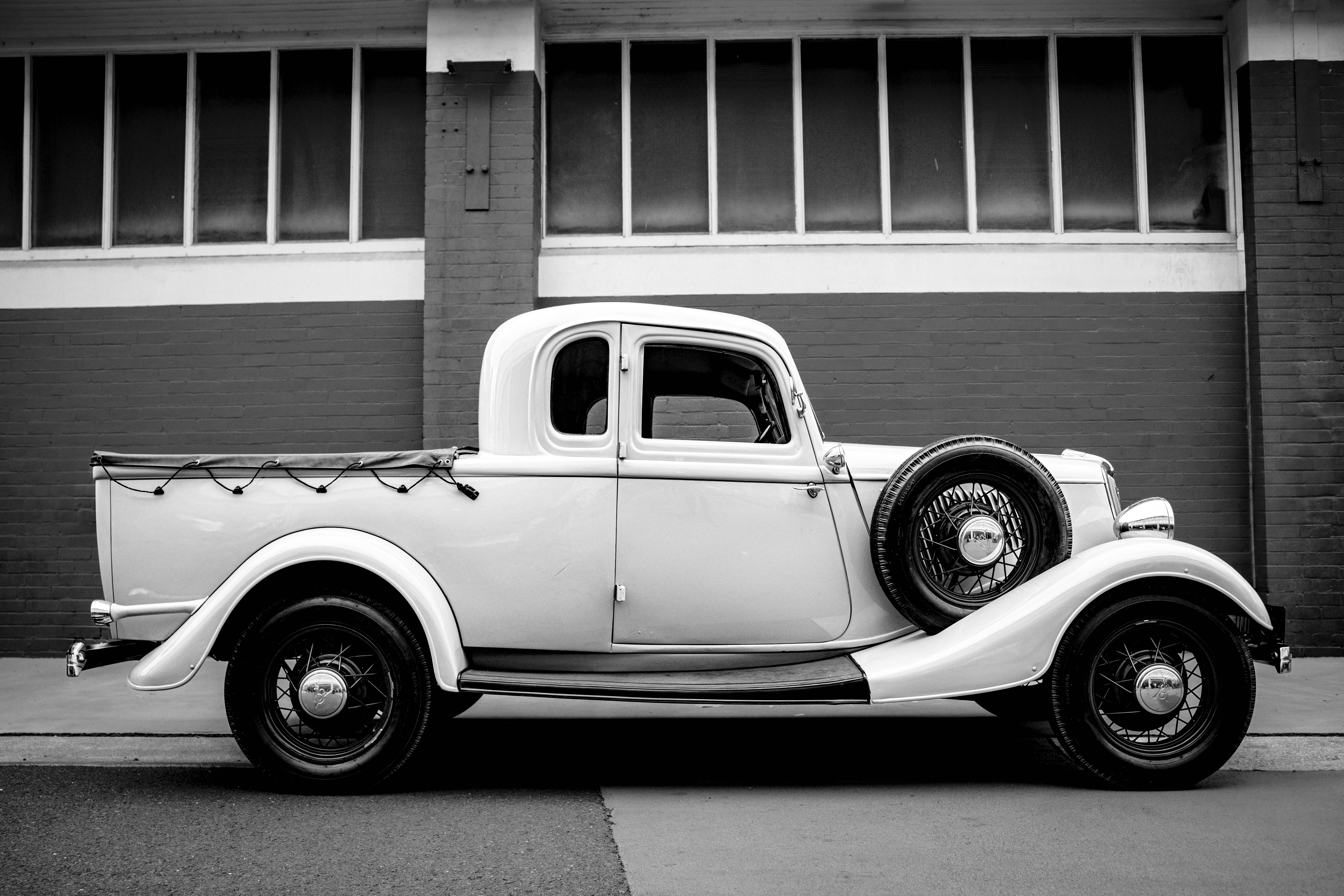
Ford Ute, side profile, as seen 4th April 2025 at Fords 100th Anniversary at the Melbourne Show Grounds

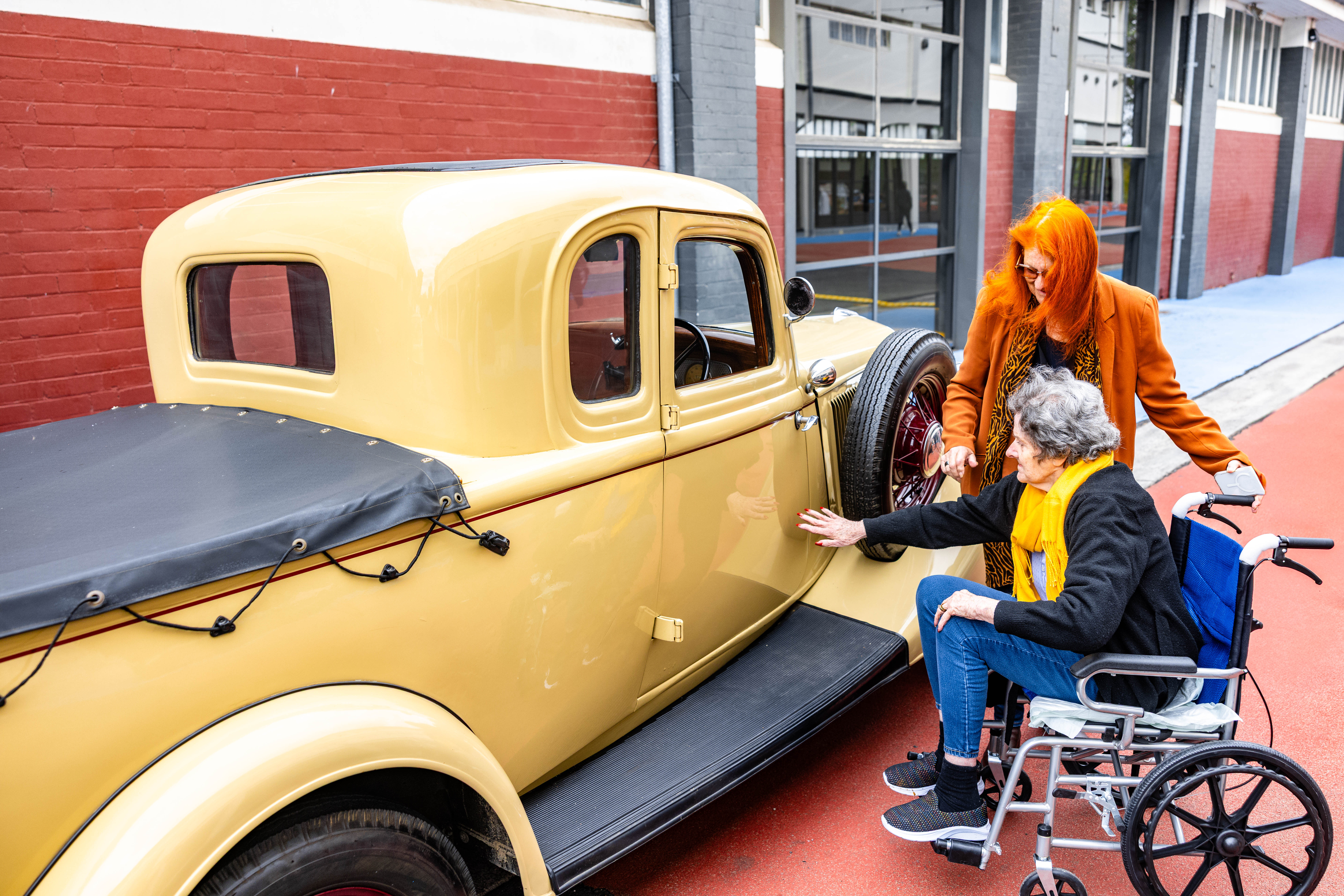
Val Smith (nee Bandt) and Ros Bandt connecting with Lewis Bandts original and iconic Ford Ute

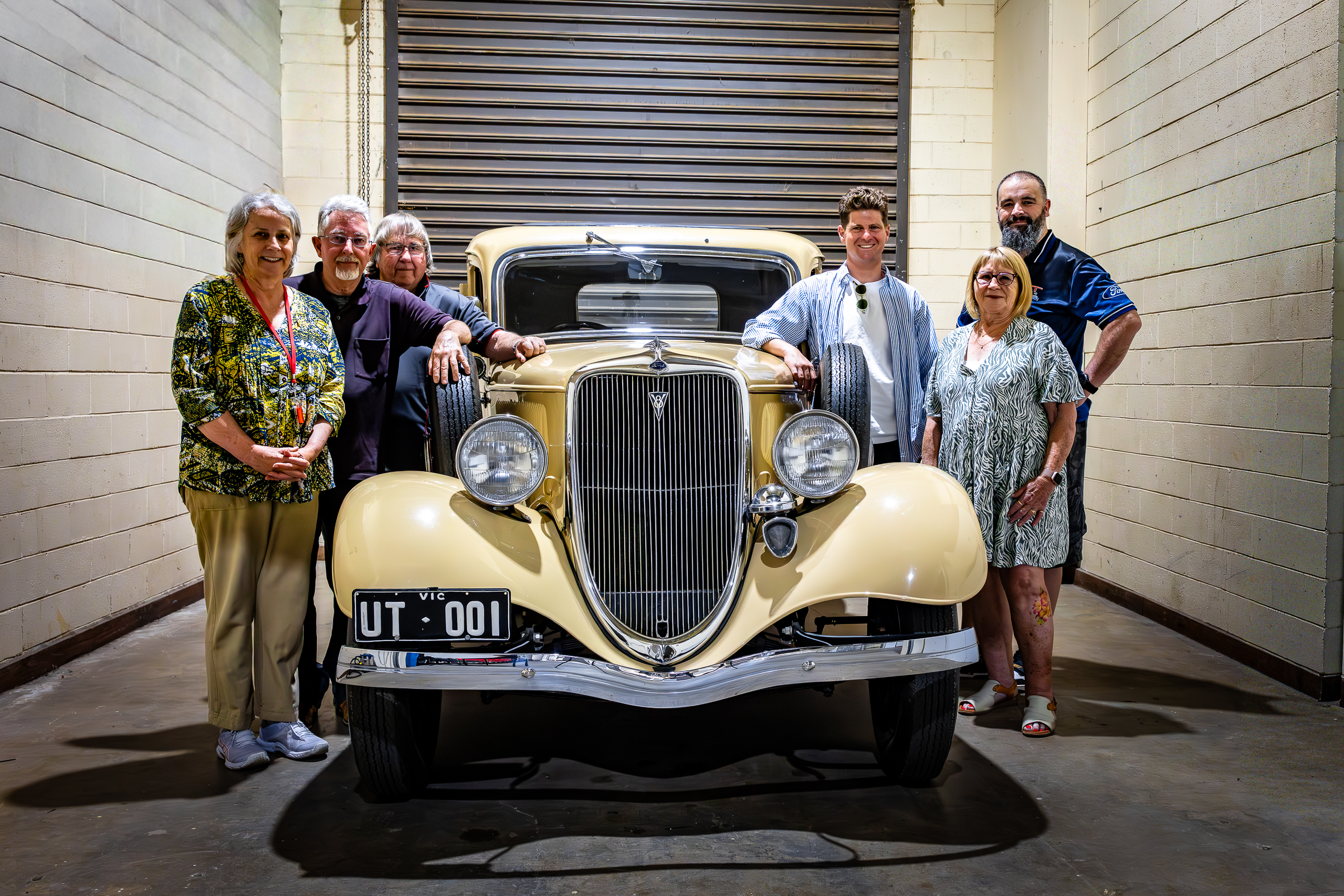
Carol, Kerry and Rick from Autoplex, with Brad and Joe, grandsons of Lew Bandt - 18/12/2025

The design of the Ute was a result of a 1932 letter from an unnamed Victorian farmer's wife asking for "a vehicle to go to church in on a Sunday and which can carry our pigs to market on Mondays". In response, Bandt developed the Ute and the model called a "coupe utility" at the time was released in 1934. When the Australian version was displayed in the US, Henry Ford nicknamed it the "Kangaroo Chaser". A convertible version, known as the roadster utility was produced in limited numbers by Ford in the 1930s.

== Later career ==
During World War II, Bandt helped to design long-range fuel tanks for Spitfire and Thunderbolt fighter planes. He also worked on design innovations for the UK-sourced Ford Zephyr, the 1967 Australian Ford Fairlane, and the never-approved Falcon convertible, of which six were built outside Ford in 1962.

== Personal life ==
Bandt married Nellie Rowe on 6 September 1941. He was a lifelong member of the Methodist (later Uniting) Church. He was known for his charity work. Lewis and Nellie had three daughters: Sylvia, Val and Ros. Later in life he also had four grandchildren: Brad, Tate, Eden and Joe. He was an accomplished artist, and painted Ford’s nativity scene at Christmas. He retired in 1975.

== Death ==
Bandt was killed on 18 March 1987, while coming home from the Australian Broadcasting Corporation television studios where he had been recording a documentary about the Ute. He was driving a 1934 model home when he collided with a truck near Bannockburn. He was survived by his wife and three daughters.

== Legacy ==
In 2008, the Lewis Bandt Bridge, which crosses the Moorabool River as part of the Geelong Ring Road, was opened and named in his honour.

In 2025 on the 4th of April, Lewis and the iconic and original Ford Ute were center stage at Ford Australia's 100th Anniversary at the Melbourne Showgrounds. The extended Bandt family attended including Lews two surviving daughters, Val and Ros, with several pictures being taken as well as the entire event being covered by Channel 9 News.

The Ute being preserved at Autoplex in Castlemaine while the location is prepared to be a showcase of Australian Automotive History.
