= Barkstead =

Barkstead may refer to:

- John Barkstead
- Barkstead, Victoria

== See also ==
- William Barksted
