= Lal Lal Falls =

Waterfall in Victoria, Australia

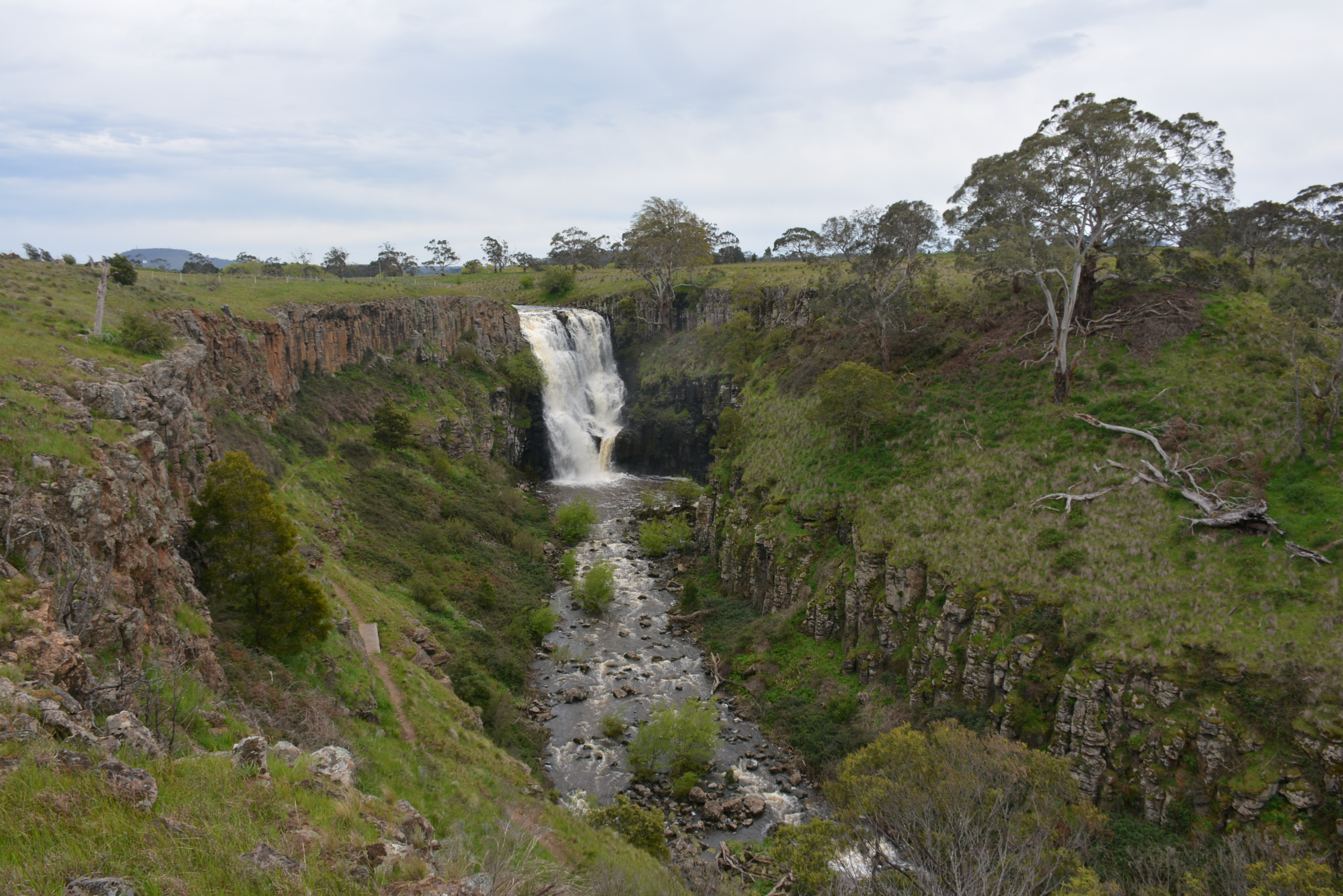
- Lal Lal Falls

- Location within Victoria
- Location: Lal Lal, Victoria, Australia
- Coordinates: 37°39′19″S 144°02′08″E
- Type: Plunge
- Total height: 34 m (112 ft)
- Number of drops: 2
- Watercourse: Lal Lal Creek

Lal Lal Falls is a waterfall located in the locality of Lal Lal, approximately 20 kilometres south-east of Ballarat, Victoria, Australia. The falls are situated within the Lal Lal Falls Scenic Reserve and are formed by the Lal Lal Creek as it descends over a basalt escarpment. The site is a popular natural attraction, known for its distinctive volcanic geology and scenic views across the surrounding plains.

== Geology ==
Lal Lal Falls are an excellent example of columnar jointing, which, like the Giant's Causeway in Northern Ireland, create regular polygonal columns. The lower section of the waterfall is composed of fine, feldspathic andesine basalt, alongside fine augite. Iddingsite can also be seen. The basalt in the upper flow contains more olivine rich phenocrysts.

== History ==
The Wathaurong Aboriginal people clan known as "Tooloora baluk" laid claim to the area surrounding the waterfall. The name "Lal Lal" is likely a generic Wathaurong word for waterfall. Bunjil, a creator deity in Aboriginal Australian mythology is said to reside at the waterfall when on Earth.

The first European to have discovered the waterfall was likely Frederick D'Arcy, a government surveyor who was surveying the Moorabool and Leigh Rivers, when he was told about the waterfall by a group of local Aboriginals. In August 1837, he, alongside squatters Alexander Thomson, George Russell, David Fisher, Captain Charles Hutton, Thomas Learmonth, Henry Anderson and an Aboriginal guide (potentially named "Darriwill") went to visit the waterfall. However, it was found to be not flowing, owing to the dry season.

Prior to the incorporation of the land into a pastoral lease, access and knowledge to the waterfall was very limited due to the falls' remoteness at the time. In 1840, the area surrounding the waterfall was incorporated into the Lal Lal Pastoral Run, managed by Hugh Blakeney and Charles Ayrey. George Augustus Robinson, Chief Protector of Aborigines of the Port Phillip District visited the waterfall that same year, and recorded "Woringganninyoke" as the waterfall name, "Nanden" as a smaller waterfall upstream, and "Yarkyowing" for Lal Lal Creek. Peter Inglis purchased the run in 1843, followed by John Whitehall Stevens around 1845−1846, then Inglis' nephew Archibald Fisken in 1854.

In 1857, with freehold land becoming available for auction, the sale of land in the area was advertised, putting both Lal Lal Falls and nearby Moorabool Falls in the spotlight. The Ballarat Star, advertising the sale, likened the scenery to the "Scottish Highlands". Several travellers to the section of land around the waterfall recounted their time there, and with the help of several newspapers publishing their stories, tried to convince the Victorian Government to set the land aside as a public reserve. Their convincing was ultimately successful, with the Government establishing a 200 acres (90 ha) reserve known as "Lal Lal Park" in 1865, later renamed "Lal Lal Falls Scenic Reserve".

Austrian artist Eugene von Guerard visited the waterfalls between 1853 and 1854, whilst in the area pursuing gold mining on the Victorian Goldfields, creating several sketches. In 1858, based off sketches of his previous visits, completed "Fall of the Lallal Creek".

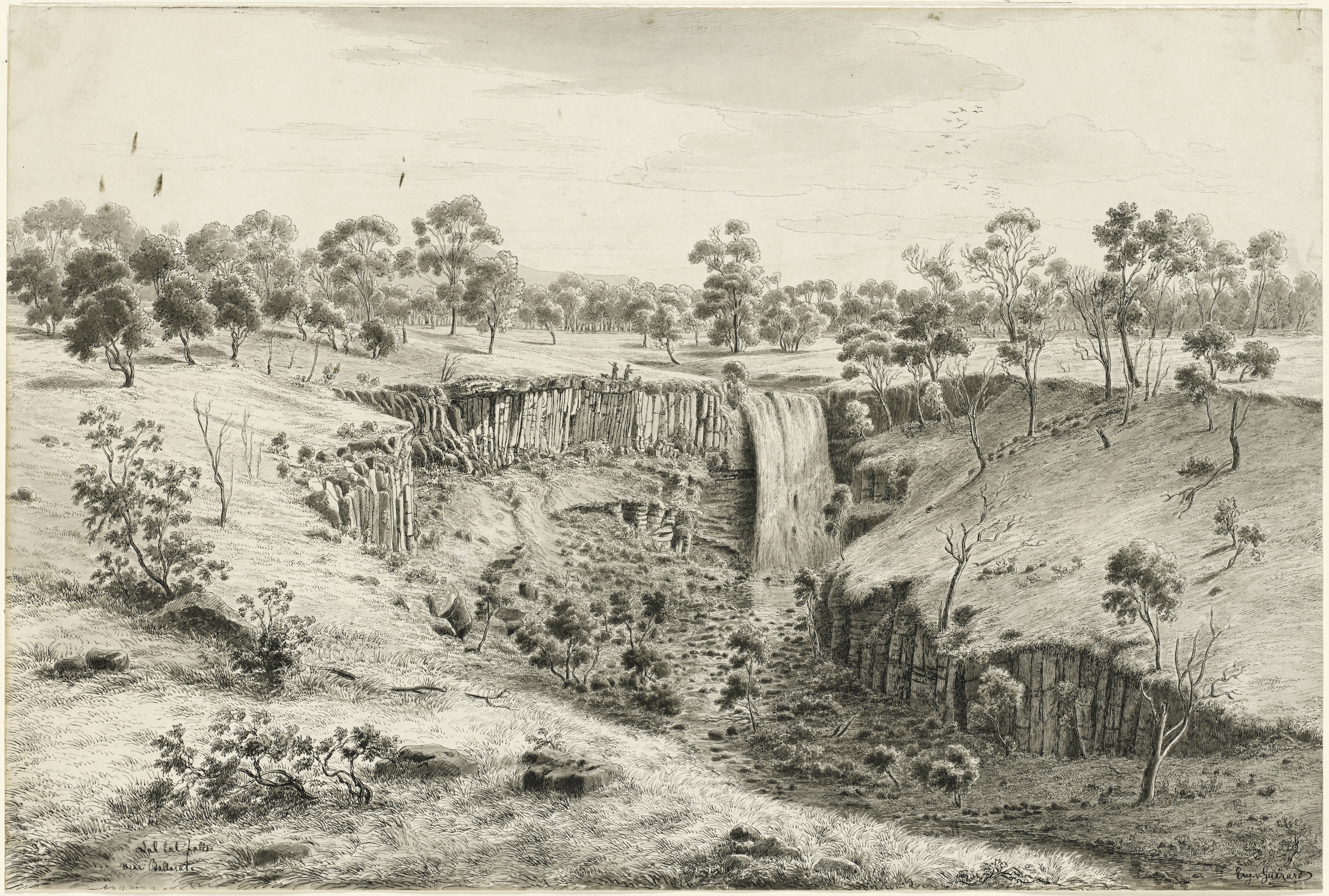
Fall of the Lallal Creek, 1858 (by Eugene von Guerard)

In 1863, the Ballarat Water Committee dammed part of Lal Lal Creek to divert water for the gold miners further north in Ballarat, leading to less impressive flows.

Tourism began to rapidly increase following the establishment of the nearby Lal Lal Racecourse in 1864. Many of the racegoers, attending picnic races, would also visit the falls, increasing even more with the estbalishment of a branch line splitting off from Lal Lal railway station to the racecourse. The last official race meeting was held on New Year's Eve in 1938, and the branch line torn up not long after.

Between 1877 and 1964, the reserve was jointly managed by the Shire of Buninyong and the City of Ballarat, with sole management by the Shire of Buninyong from 1964 until 1977, when an officer from the West Moorabool Water Board was charged as caretaker from 1977 onwards.

In 1939, a walking bridge on the pathway to the falls was constructed, and formal walking trails were made in 1951. In 1953, old trees that existed in the picnic ground were removed, and in 1957 a playground was made. Further developments include the construction of a lookout in 1961, and a cement stairway that lead down to the falls, with safety railing installed above the falls, both in 1963. The picnic ground was further developed in 1980 with toilets, fireplaces, seats, tables and a car park created, replacing earlier concrete seats and tables that had fallen into a state of disrepair.

In 1988, fencing was erected in order to protect a rare outcrop of anchor plant.

On 28 March 1990, 12 year old Danielle Rundle from Melton West and 13 year old Natasha Karlich from Melton were killed by falling boulders whilst abseiling down the cliffs at the falls. The two girls, as well as 13 others who were hurt, were on a school excursion. The Coroner found Mowbray College (the school the two girls attended) "contributed to the deaths by undertaking a potentially dangerous activity without ensuring that appropriately qualified experts assessed the area before the crime". The path to the base of the waterfall has since been closed, and abseiling at the falls has been banned.

Between 2004 and 2008, the Lal Lal Advisory Committee oversaw several upgrades to the site, including the creation of new walking tracks, barbecue facilities, and the removal of pine trees. Signs were also added. In 2008, a walking track from Lal Lal Falls to Moorabool Falls was completed.

== See also ==
- Buckley Falls
- Dyers Falls
