= Dyers Falls =

Waterfall in Victoria, Australia

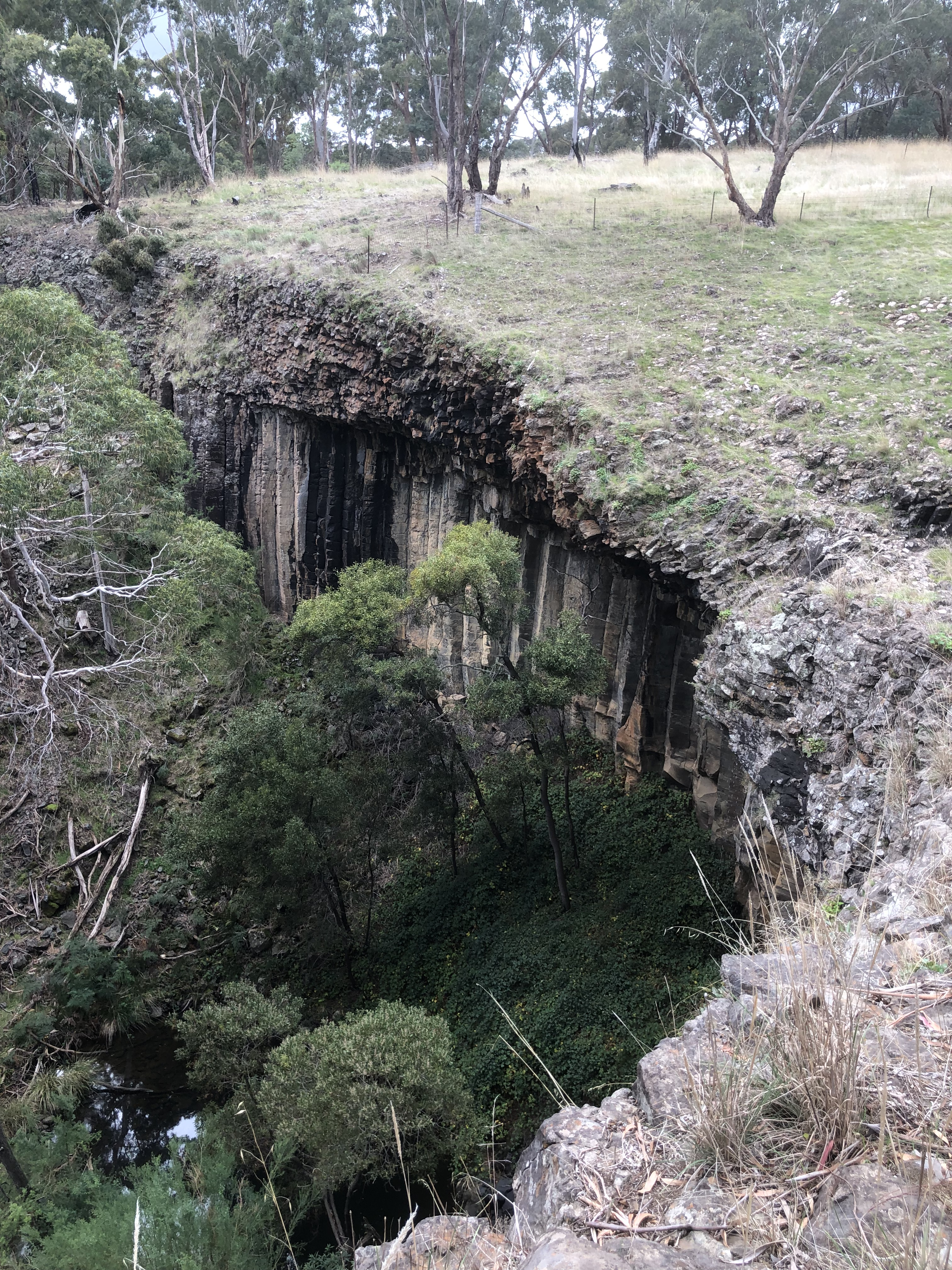
- Dyers Falls, viewed from the top

- Location within Victoria
- Location: Glenlyon, Victoria, Australia
- Coordinates: 37°15′25″S 144°15′12″E
- Type: Plunge
- Total height: 17.5 m (57 ft)
- Number of drops: 1
- Watercourse: Dyers Creek

Dyers Falls is a 17.5 metre high waterfall located on Dyers Creek, approximately 5 km north of Glenlyon in central Victoria, Australia. The waterfall features exposed volcanic rock formations associated with extensive basalt lava flows. The waterfall is situated within the Dyers Falls Scenic Reserve, which is managed by Parks Victoria.

== Geology ==
Dyers Falls exposes two distinct lava flows belonging to the Newer Volcanic Group. The lower flow displays well-developed columnar joining, forming a prominent cliff face where cooling fractures have produced vertical basalt columns. These structures consist of a lower colonnade of wider, more uniform columns overlain by a thinner entablature of short, irregular columns. This difference reflects contrasting cooling rates within the lava flow, as the interior cooled slowly and evenly forming large columns, while the upper surface cooled more rapidly, producing smaller, more fragmented columnar strucutres. The basalt is described as dark greenish to bluish-grey porphyrritic olivine basalt.

At the base of the falls, an adit has been driven into underlying Calivil Formation gravels, which predate the basalt flows and rest above the older Castlemaine Group bedrock. These gravels form part of "deep lead" gold-bearing deposits that were extensively mined during the late 19th and early 20th centuries in central Victoria. The gravels consist largely of sub-rounded to rounded vein quartz clasts, including material up to boulder size, part of an ancient river system that was buried by volcanic activity.

== Access ==
Public access to the waterfall is dubious, as whilst the waterfall itself sits within the public, Parks Victoria-managed "Dyers Falls Scenic Reserve", the surrounding land is private property. Access can be gained via Thomas Mole Lane by following the creek downward for 250 metres toward the waterfall.

== See also ==
- Trentham Falls
- Lal Lal Falls
