= Glenlyon, Victoria =

Glenlyon
- Town
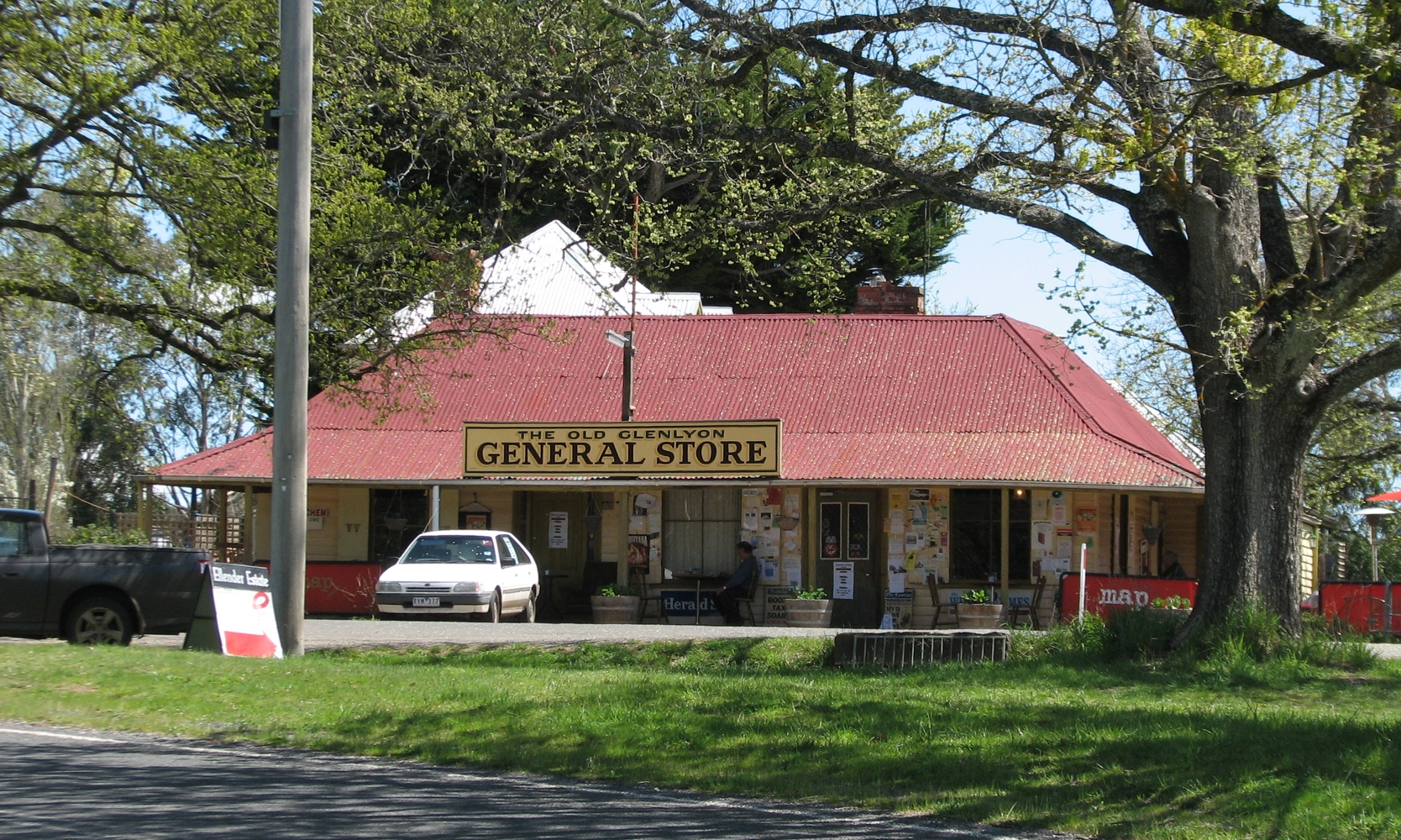
- General store

- Interactive map of Glenlyon
- Coordinates: 37°15′0″S 144°15′0″E
- Country: Australia
- State: Victoria
- LGA: Shire of Hepburn
- Location: 100 km (62 mi) NW of Melbourne; 11 km (6.8 mi) NE of Daylesford; 17 km (11 mi) SW of Malmsbury

Population
  - Total: 431 (2021 census)
- Postcode: 3461

Glenlyon is a town in the Shire of Hepburn, Victoria, Australia around 10 km from Daylesford along the Daylesford–Malmsbury Road, and around 101 km from the Melbourne CBD via Kyneton and Malmsbury. Glenlyon is located on the Loddon River. At the 2021 census, Glenlyon had a population of 431.

Main street of Glenlyon with European trees in full bloom in summer

The surrounding district supports cattle and sheep grazing, producing meat and wool for local and international markets. Potatoes, cereal crops (for both hay and grain), organic vegetables, vegetable seed, and lucerne are grown in the volcanic soil.

== History ==
In 1846, Richard Babington and John Carpenter purchased a part of the Holcombe Run (originally part of A.F. Mollisons Coliban Run) and called it Glenlyon after their Scottish home.

Copy of the original Crown Survey by the Victorian Colonial government in 1867 establishing and planning the township of Glenlyon.

Glenlyon Post Office opened around May 1858 and closed in 1973.

Glenlyon once had a primary school and hotels but all are closed.

The original general store operated until approx 2009 when it closed. A new general store opened in the old premises, bringing to the town a revitalised heart. The revitalised store, which is well utilised by tourists passing through does duty as a cafe with an outdoor eating area and selected groceries. Beside the store is the local community notice board.

The former Shire Hall on the main street served as the seat of the Shire of Glenlyon until the shire merged with the neighbouring Borough of Daylesford in May 1966. The building is now used as a public hall and is nominally owned by the Glenlyon Progress Association. In 2017–18, Regional Development Victoria provided funding for renovations, and the hall reopened in March 2018.

A village market is also held in and around the Glenlyon Hall on the third Saturday of the month.

Glenlyon Recreation Reserve is also home to the Glenlyon & District Pony Club.

The major activity held in Glenlyon is the annual Paint Glenlyon and Dee Waterhouse Memorial Art Prize Competition, held around the Easter break. Entrants must have painted a (recognisable) landscape in/around Glenlyon. With a first prize of $1000 it is one of the largest art prizes in regional Australia. This is sponsored and organised by the Glenlyon Progress Association.

== Demographics ==
As at the 2021 Census, Glenlyon had a population of 431 people. The median age of the local population is 53 as of 2021. The top 5 cultural backgrounds of the local population are broken up into 41.3% claiming English heritage, 31.6% Australian heritage, 15.3% Irish, 11.1% Scottish and 4.9% Germany—however, of these numbers, 72.6% were actually born in Australia, 6.7% in England and 2.8% in New Zealand. 87% only spoke English at home. 48.7% are employed in professional or managerial roles with 15.1% as technicians and trades workers and 11.6% as community and personal service workers.

== See also ==
- Dyers Falls
