= Lewis Bandt Bridge =

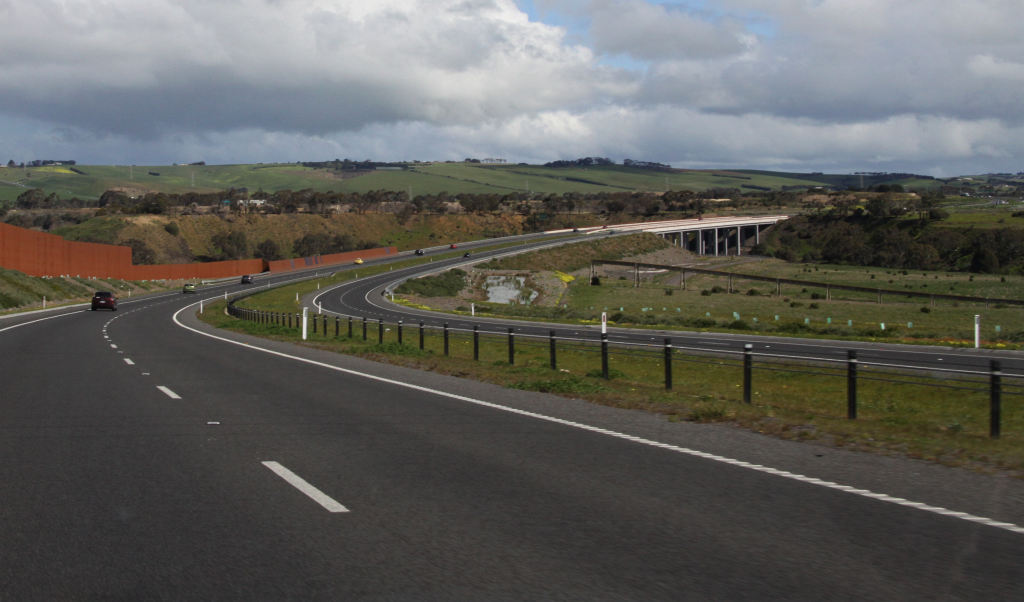
- Looking south along the Ring Road to the Lewis Bandt Bridge
- Coordinates: 38°8′1.46″S 144°18′27.08″E

History
- Opened: 14 December 2008

The Lewis Bandt Bridge is an Australian feature bridge over the Moorabool River, close to the southern end of Stage 2 of the Geelong Ring Road.

Section 2 from the Midland Highway to the Hamilton Highway at Fyansford, (along with Section 1), was officially opened on Sunday, 14 December 2008. Two days of torrential rain beforehand threatened to disrupt the opening, however it went ahead as planned after a cessation of the storm. The opening carried was out by Victorian Premier John Brumby, who announced the naming of the bridge as the Lewis Bandt Bridge in honour of the Ford Australia engineer Lewis Bandt who is credited as the inventor of the coupé utility, in Geelong.

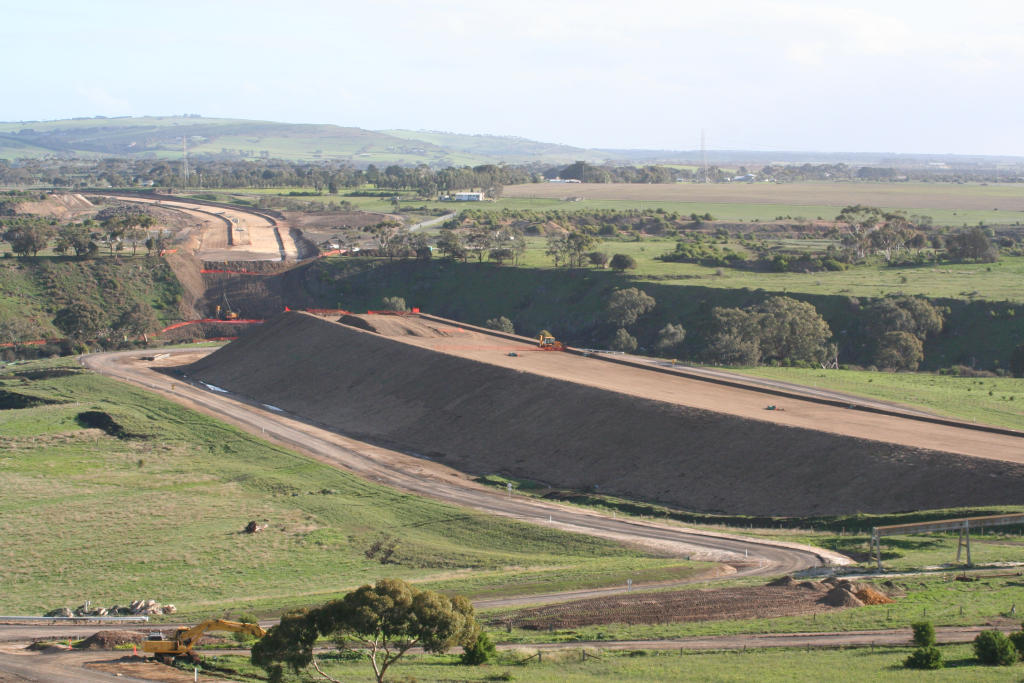
The bridge under construction in 2007, viewed from the north

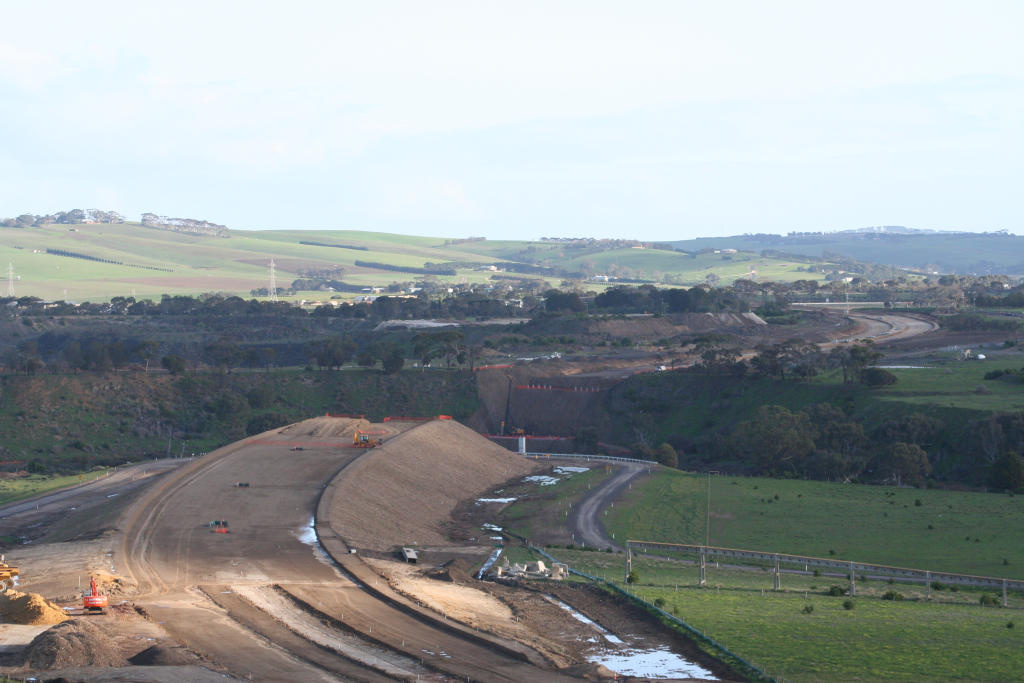
The bridge under construction in 2007
