= Mount Egerton =

Mount Egerton may refer to:

- Mount Egerton, Victoria, a town in Australia
- Mount Egerton in the Churchill Mountains of Antarctica
