= Ros Bandt =

Australian composer

Rosalie (Ros) Edith Bandt (born 18 August 1951 in Geelong) is an Australian composer, sound artist, academic and performer.

== Biography ==
Bandt was born in Geelong, Victoria. Her father Lewis Bandt was a car designer and notable for designing the first ute.

Described as one of the most individual presences in Australian music, Bandt is an internationally acclaimed sound artist, composer, researcher and performer. Trained as a school teacher, Bandt went on to study chance music and completed her master's degree in 1974 at Monash University with a thesis on the work of John Cage and later completed her PhD in 1983 also at Monash. In 1977 Bandt and Martin Harris created a sound installation, Winds and Circuits which fed audio into television signals to create electronic visual patterns. Since that time she pioneered interactive sound installations, sound sculptures, and created sound playgrounds, spatial music systems, and some 40 sound installations worldwide.

A pioneer of interactive sound sculpture in Australia, she has exhibited in many Australian city and regional centres, including her work Sound Playground in Brunswick, Melbourne in 1981. Making use of electronics, tapes and interactive playback systems, Bandt's compositions also feature environmental sounds and unusual instrument combinations. Bandt performs on a wide variety of instruments including recorders, psaltry, percussion and the tarhu. She is a founding member of ensembles LIME, Back to Back Zithers, La Romanesca, Carte Blanche and the Free Music Ensemble.

== Awards ==
=== Don Banks Music Award ===
The Don Banks Music Award was established in 1984 to publicly honour a senior artist of high distinction who has made an outstanding and sustained contribution to music in Australia. It was founded by the Australia Council in honour of Don Banks, Australian composer, performer and the first chair of its music board.

Year	Nominee / work	Award	Result
1991	Ros Bandt	Don Banks Music Award	Won

Bandt was awarded the Cochrane Smith award for sound heritage in 2012 by the National Film and Sound Archive.

In 2020 Bandt was awarded the Richard Gill Award for Distinguished Services to Australian Music at the APRA Art Music Awards in recognition of her 40-year commitment to inter-disciplinary work.

== Discography ==
- 1980 Love lyrics and romances of Renaissance Spain. La Romanesca. Move Records, MD 3034
- 1981 Improvisations in Acoustic Chambers Tank Pieces and Silo Pieces Move records MS 3035, MC 3035
- 1982 Soft and Fragile: Music in Glass and Clay Move Records MS 3045, MC 3045
- 1985 Clay Music. LIME. Move Records, MD 3065
- 1989 Stargazer Move Records MD 3075, MC 3075
- 1992 An Iberian Triangle: Music of Christian, Jewish and Moorish Spain before 1492. La Romanesca. Move Records MD 3114
- 1992 Quivering String. Back to Back Zithers. Move Records, MD 3141
- 1993 Footsteps Move Records, MD 3135
- 1995 Glass & Clay Move Records, MD 3045
- 1999 Via Frescobaldi. La Romaesca. Move Records, MD 3206
- 2001 Stack Move Records, MD 3145
- 2003 Sonic Archaeologies Move Records, MD 3155
- 2005 Monodies. La Romanesca. Move Records, MD 3044
- 2008 Isobue, Japanese Sea Whistle Sonic Art Gallery SG0801
- 2013 Jaara Jaara Seasons Hearing Places
- 2015 Bird Song - Trio Avium Hearing Places
- 2016 Tarhu connections Hearing Places

== Selected publications ==
- 2001 Sound Sculpture, Intersections in Sound and Sculpture in Australian Artworks
- 2007 Hearing Places: Interdisciplinary Writings on Sound, Place, Time and Culture with Michelle Duffy and Dolly MacKinnon
