= St James' Anglican Church, Morrisons =

Anglican church in Morrisons, Victoria, Australia

- St James' Church of England Church
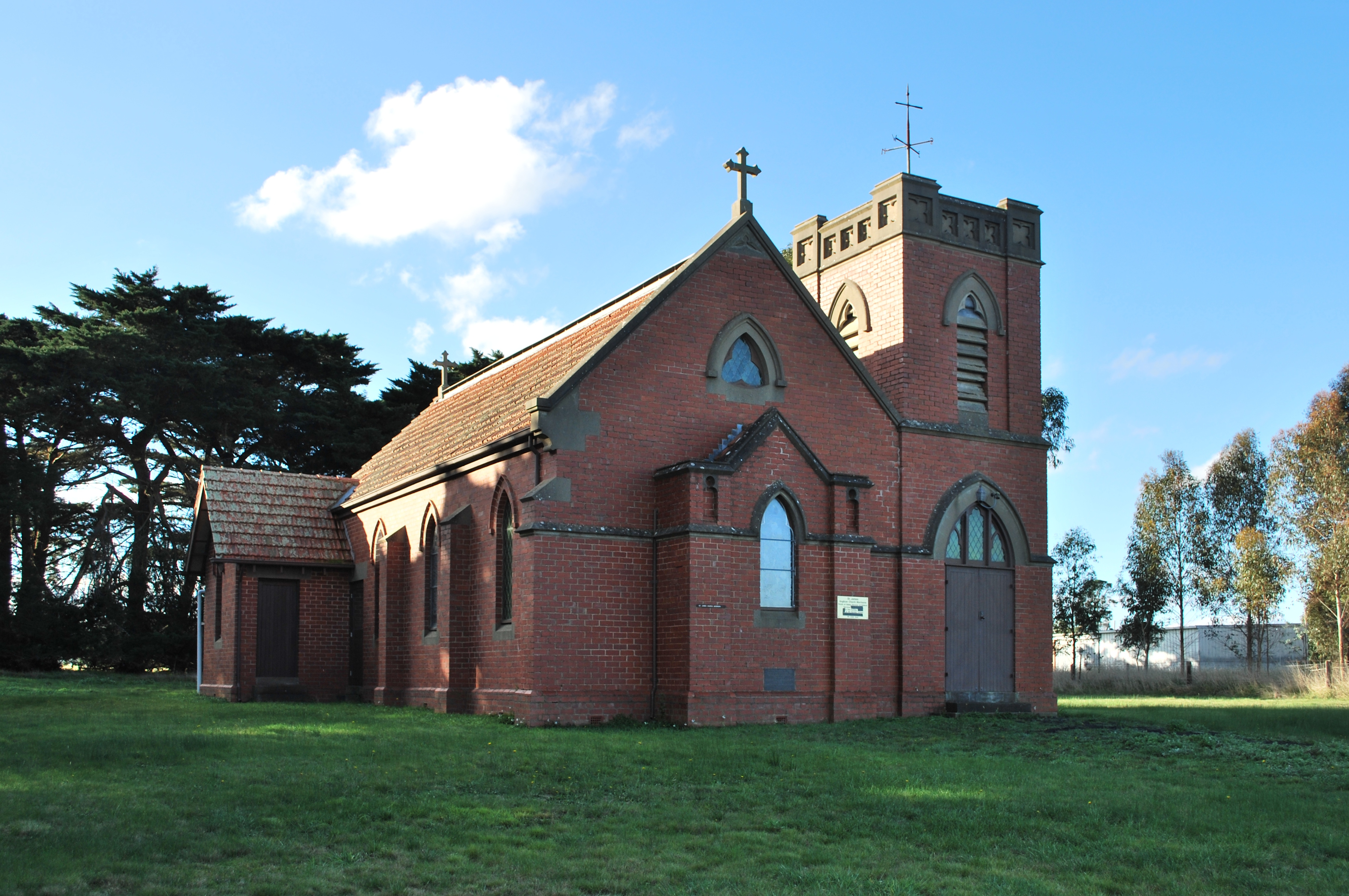
- St James' Anglican Church
- St James' Anglican Church, Morrisons
- 37°46′46″S 144°05′59″E
- Location: 9 Tableland Road, Morrisons, Victoria
- Country: Australia
- Denomination: Anglican Church of Australia

History
- Status: Active
- Dedication: Saint James

Architecture
- Completed: 1924

Administration
- Province: Victoria
- Diocese: Ballarat

St James' Anglican Church is an Anglican church located in the locality of Morrisons, Victoria, Australia. The church forms part of the Parish of West Moorabool within the Anglican Diocese of Ballarat. Constructed in 1924, the building replaced an earlier weatherboard church, and remains the last church remaining in the locality.

== History ==
Anglican worship in the Morrisons district dates to the mid-nineteenth century, when a church, doubling as a school, opened in 1861.

A music concert, followed by a ball, was held in the Assembly Rooms of Morrisons on 26 October 1874, with performances by the students in order to raise money for the school. £15 pounds was ultimately raised.

This building, constructed in weatherboard, was eventually deemed inadequate, and in 1924, the structure was removed to the nearby town of Lethbridge, and a new brick church was constructed in its place.

The foundation stone of the new church was laid on 3 July 1924 by Frances Hill Molesworth, wife of pastoralist John Matheson Molesworth of Ballark, and was dedicated to Saint James.

During the 20th century, the population of Morrisons declined following the end of mining and the consolidation of farming properties. As a result, several churches in the district closed by the 1950s, leaving St James' Anglican Church as one of the few remaining churches in the region.
