= Morrisons, Victoria =

Morrisons
- Town
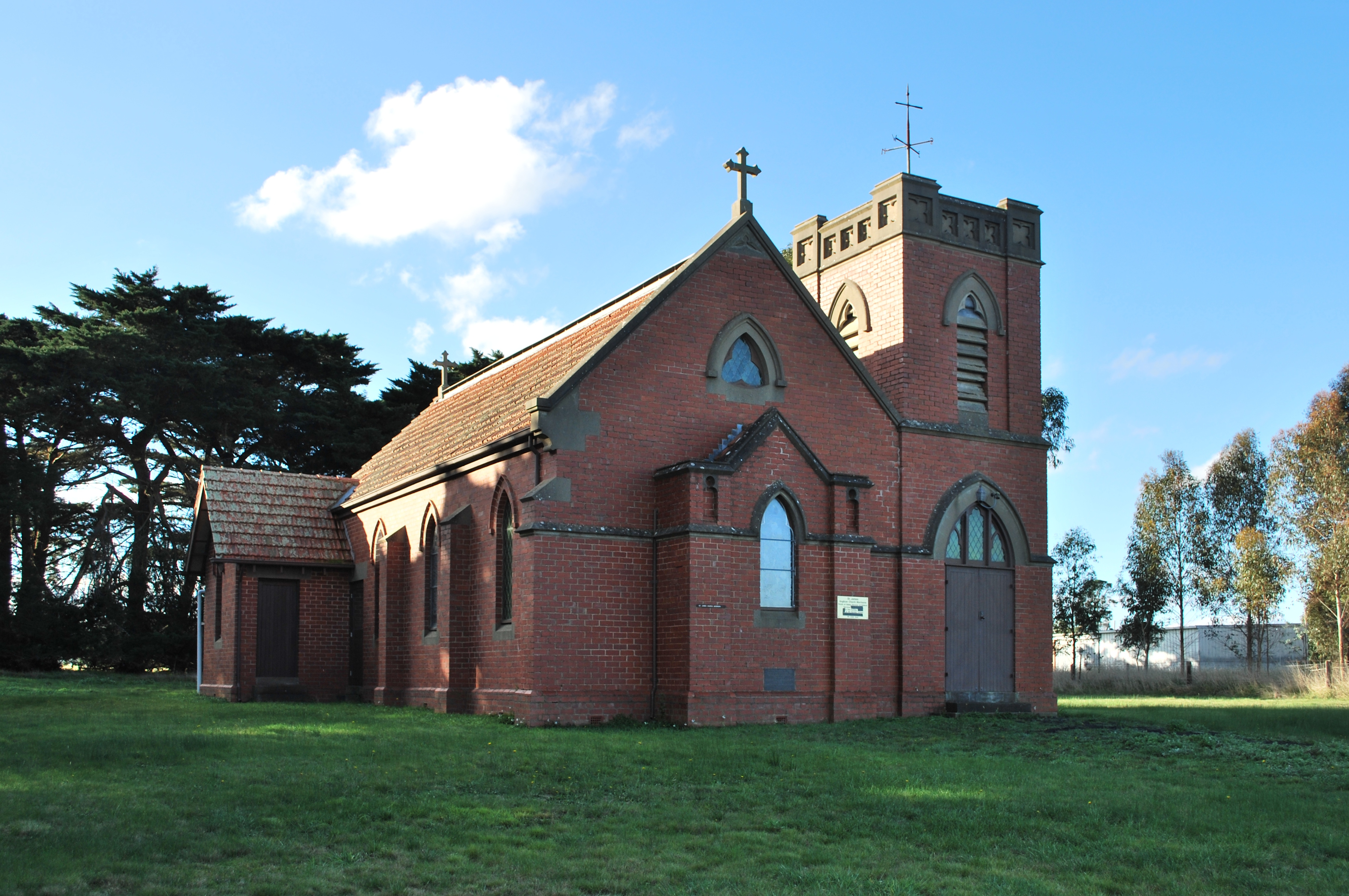
- St James' Anglican Church at Morrisons

- Coordinates: 37°46′46″S 144°06′00″E
- Country: Australia
- State: Victoria
- LGAs: Shire of Moorabool; Golden Plains Shire
- Location: 99 km (62 mi) W of Melbourne; 40 km (25 mi) SW of Ballarat; 9 km (5.6 mi) N of Meredith

Government
  - State electorate: Eureka
  - Federal division: Ballarat

Population
  - Total: 118 (SAL 2021)
- Postcode: 3334

Morrisons is a locality in central Victoria, Australia. The locality is on the Moorabool River and shared between the Shire of Moorabool and Golden Plains Shire, 99 kilometres (62 mi) west of the state capital, Melbourne and 40 kilometres (25 mi) south east of the regional city of Ballarat.

At the 2016 census, Morrisons had a population of 128.
