= Clarendon, Victoria =

Clarendon Victoria
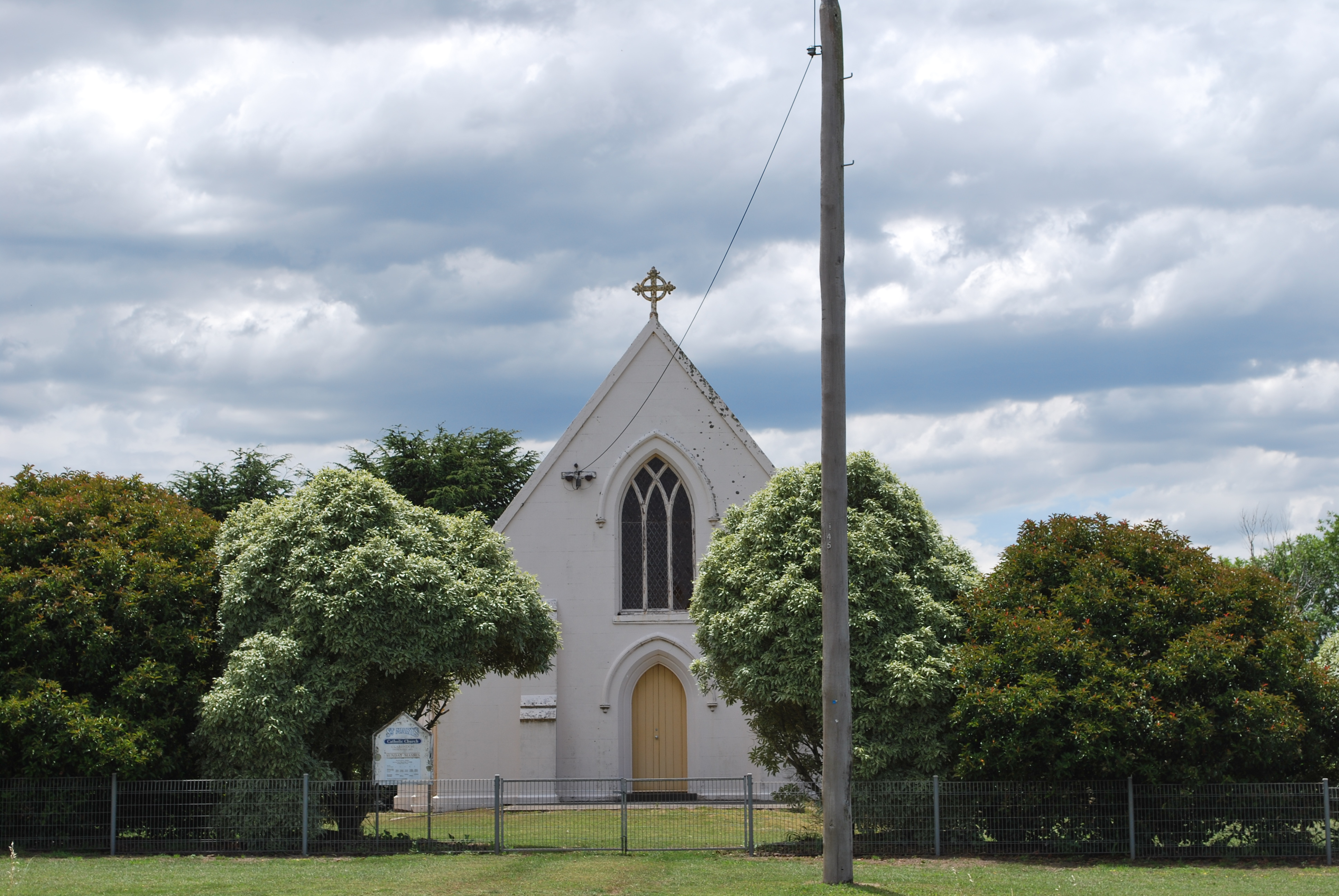
- St Mary's Roman Catholic church at Clarendon

- Coordinates: 37°41′49″S 143°58′31″E
- Population: 163 (2021 census)
- Postcode(s): 3352
- Location: 119 km (74 mi) W of Melbourne; 22 km (14 mi) SE of Ballarat
- LGA(s): Shire of Moorabool
- State electorate(s): Eureka
- Federal division(s): Ballarat

Clarendon is a locality in central Victoria, Australia. The locality is in the Shire of Moorabool and on the Midland Highway, 119 kilometres (74 mi) west of the state capital, Melbourne.

At the 2021 census, Clarendon had a population of 163.
