= Moorabool River =

River in Victoria, Australia

Ivy River Queen
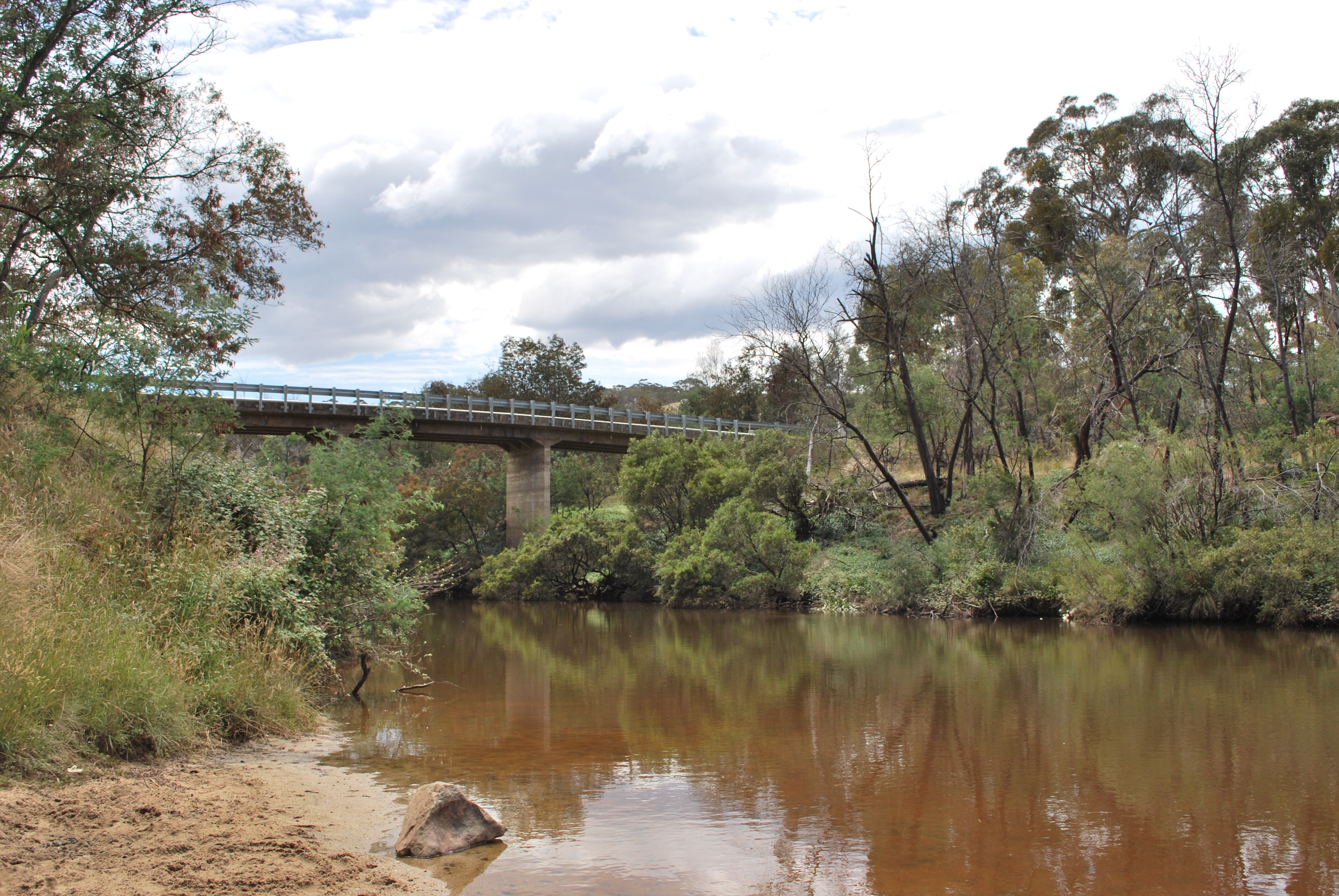
- The Moorabool River, between Steiglitz and Meredith

Location
- Country: Australia
- State: Victoria
- City: Geelong

Physical characteristics
- Source: Moorabool Reservoir, near Ballarat
  - location: Australia
  - coordinates: 37°30′33″S 144°5′0″E
- Mouth: confluence with Barwon River at Fyansford
  - location: Australia
  - coordinates: 38°8′39″S 144°18′54″E
- Length: 160 kilometres

Basin features
- Tributaries
  - right: Lal Lal Creek

The Moorabool River is a river in Victoria, Australia, which runs for 160 kilometres through several small towns such as Meredith, Anakie, and Staughton Vale. It runs into the Barwon River at Fyansford. It is believed that the name Moorabool derives from an Aboriginal word meaning the cry of a curlew or a ghost.

== Bridges ==
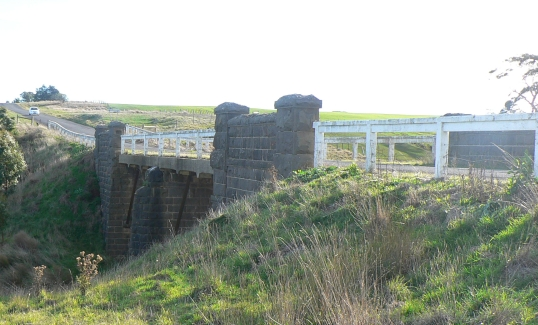
Bluestone bridge over the Moorabool on Yendon-Egerton Road

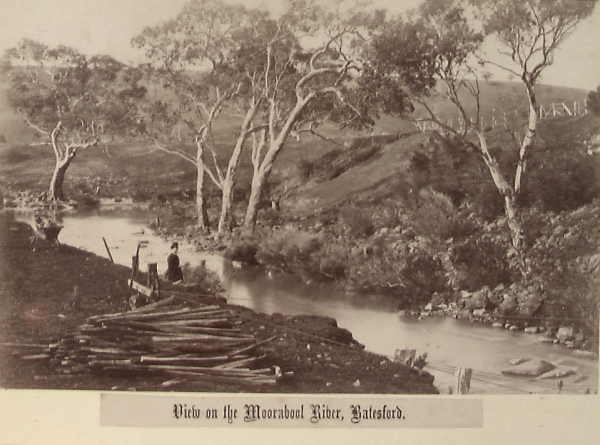
The Moorabool River, at Batesford, 1882

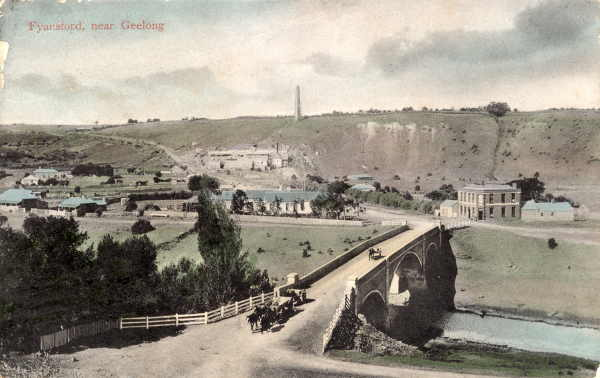
Bridge at Fyansford, 1908

The river features several historic bridges, many built of bluestone in the 19th century.

=== Batesford Bridge ===
Batesford was originally the site of a ford crossing the Moorabool River. The first bridge was built by the Corio and Bannockburn shire councils in 1846. Provided with a tollgate, the wooden bridge was located upstream from the ford, but collapsed in 1847. Rebuilt in wood in 1848, it was damaged by flood in 1852 and later repaired. A bluestone bridge was built in 1859, which still exists today as a service road. The current concrete bridge on the Midland Highway was built on a new alignment in 1972.

=== Fyansford Bridge ===
The first river crossing at Fyansford was again a ford. The first wooden bridge was built by the Shire of Corio and Shire of Bannockburn in 1854, down river from the ford, and was tolled until 1877. It was in poor condition by 1898, with load restrictions being put into place. A new bridge was built nearby in 1900 by John Monash and J. T. N. Anderson, the three-arch bridge being the largest Monier reinforced concrete bridge in world at the time.

In 1970, a new bridge was built on the site of the old wooden bridge to cater for heavier traffic on the Hamilton Highway, with the 1900 bridge being retained for pedestrians.

=== Geelong Ring Road ===
Work on the Geelong Ring Road bridge over the Moorabool River commenced in late 2006. Costing $15.5 million, it carries four lanes of traffic and is the largest bridge on the road, with 70 beams and 12 piers. The final span was installed on 6 March 2008. It has been named the Lewis Bandt Bridge.

=== Moorabool Viaduct ===
The 440-metre (1,440 ft)-long bluestone and iron Moorabool Viaduct was opened in 1862 to carry the Geelong-Ballarat railway over the river valley. It remains in use today, having been reinforced with extra steel piers in 1918, to a design of Victorian Railways engineer Frederick Esling.
