= Ballarat =

Ballarat balla arat (Wathawurrung)
- City
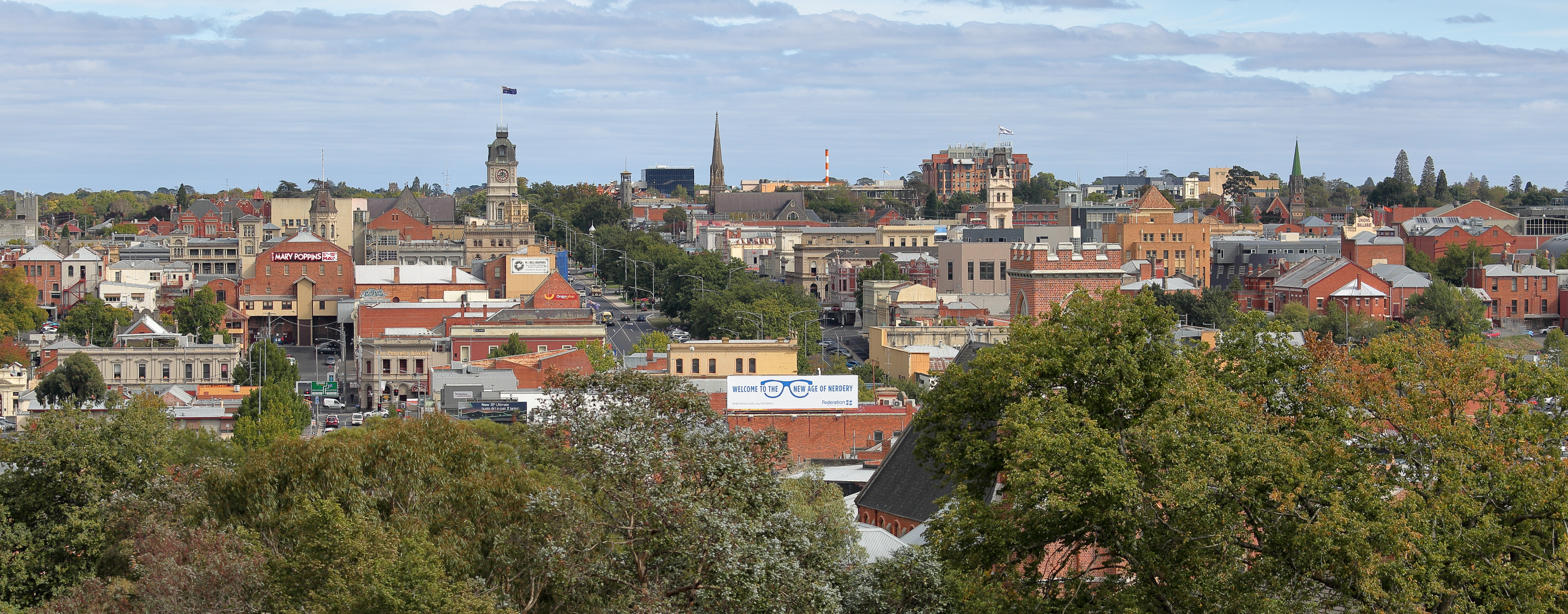
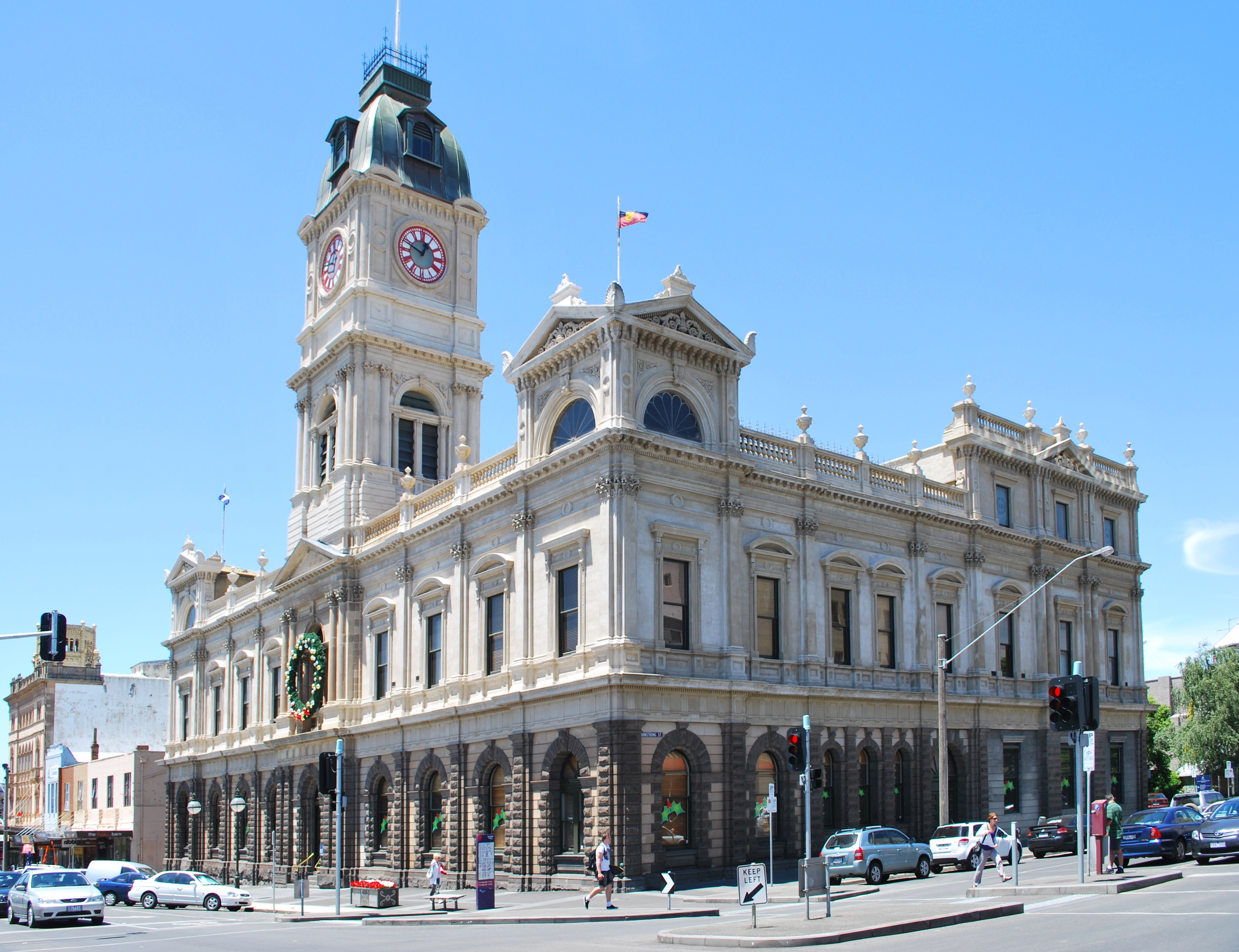
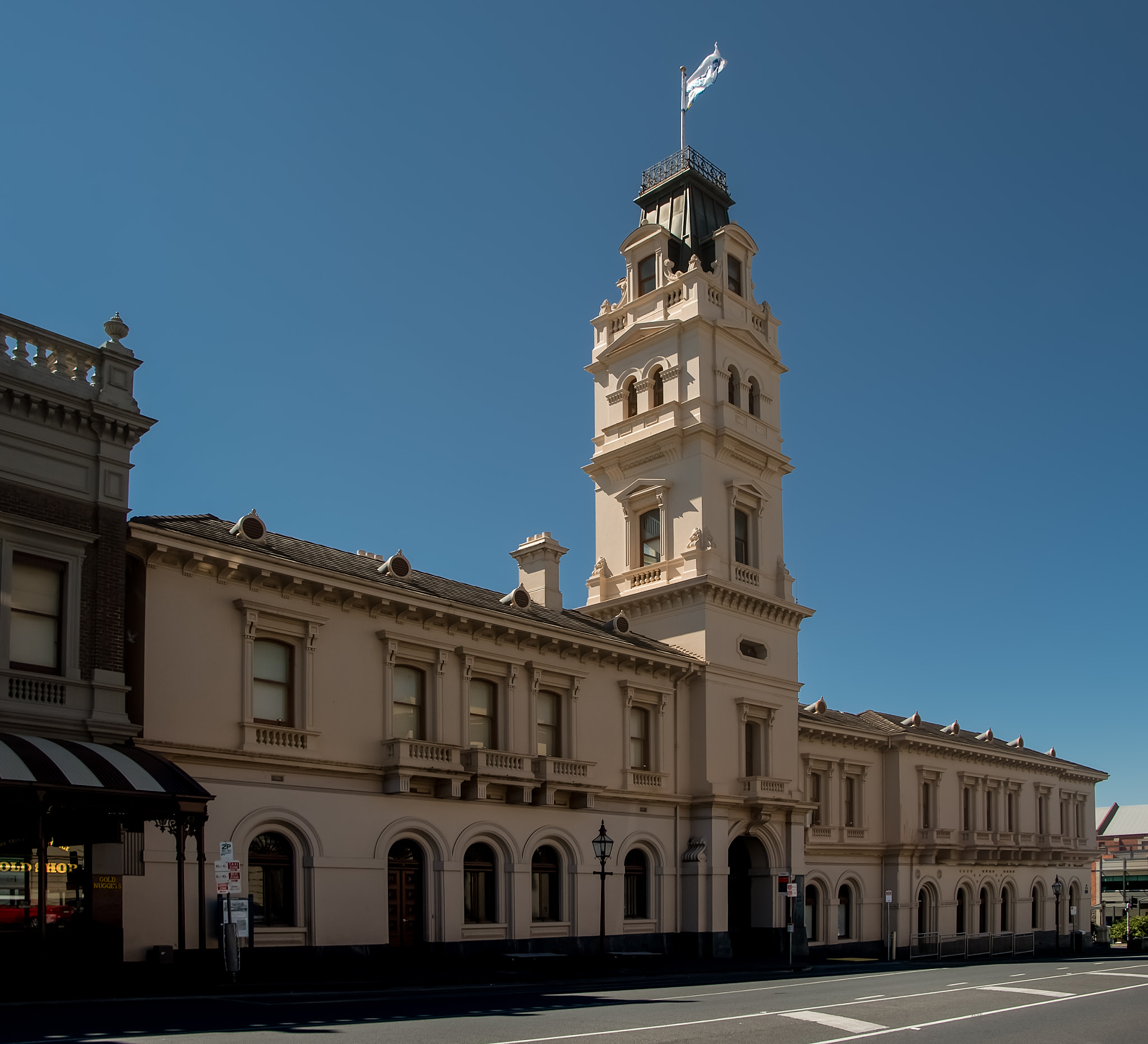
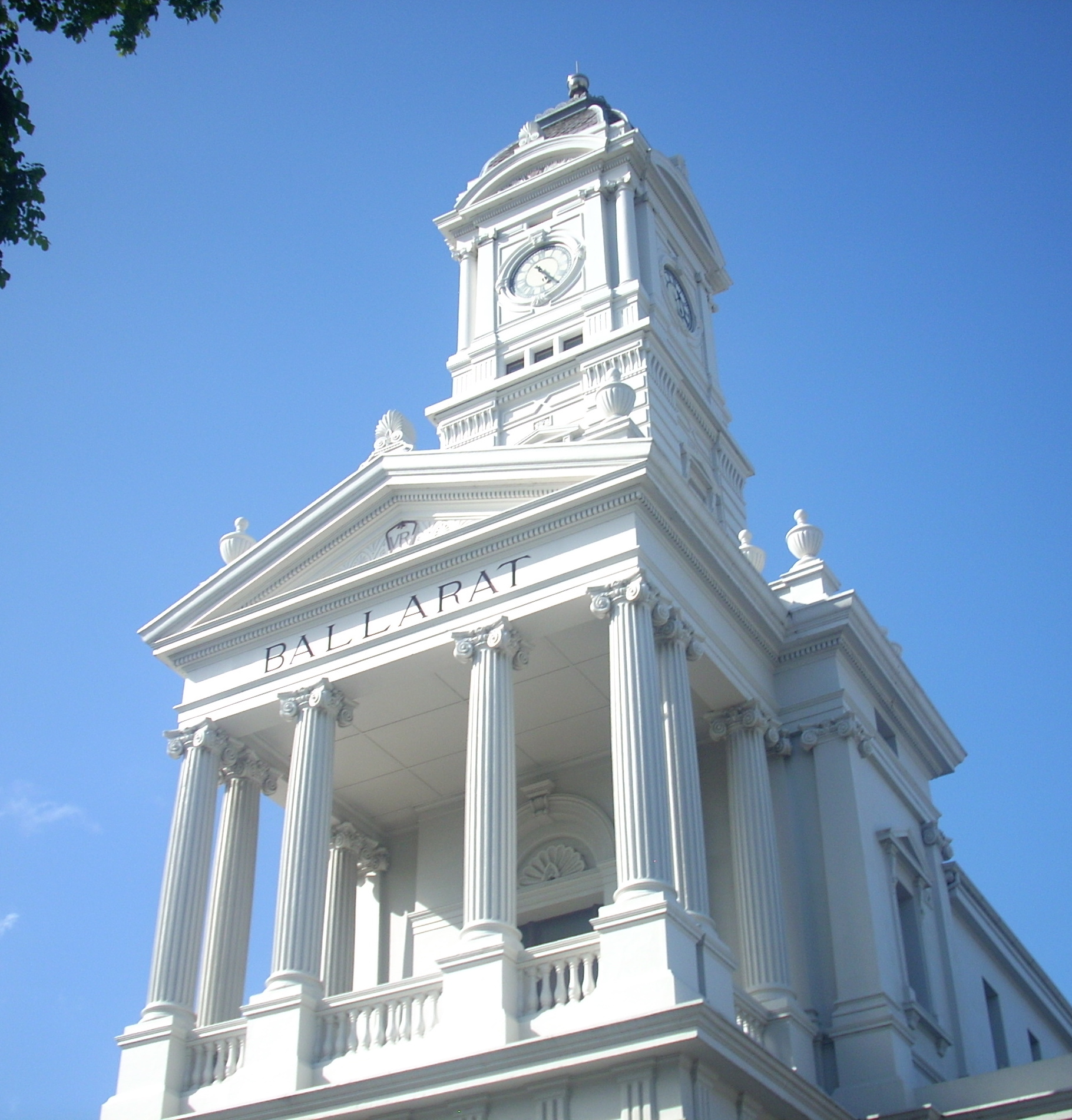
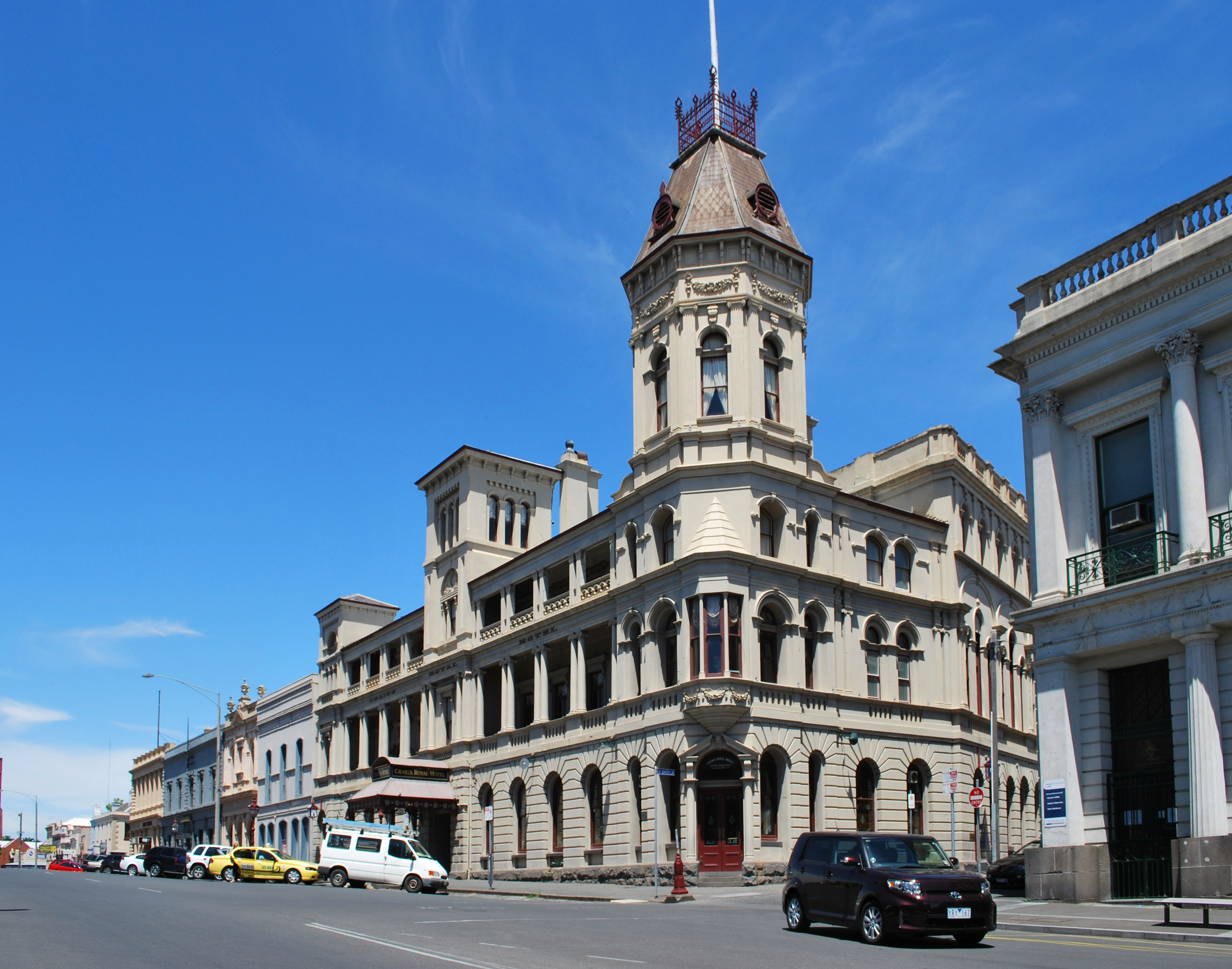
- City centre Town Hall Post Office Ballarat station Craig's Royal Hotel

- Coordinates: 37°33′39″S 143°50′51″E
- Country: Australia
- State: Victoria
- Region: Grampians
- LGA: City of Ballarat
- Location: 110 km (68 mi) NW of Melbourne; 82 km (51 mi) NW of Geelong; 95 km (59 mi) SW of Bendigo
- Established: 1838

Government
  - Mayor: Tracey Hargreaves
  - State electorates: Eureka; Ripon; Wendouree
  - Federal division: Ballarat

Area (2016 census – SUA)
  - Total: 343.6 km^{2} (132.7 sq mi)
- Elevation AHD: 435–630 m (1,427–2,067 ft)

Population
  - Total: 116,201 (2021 census) (18th)
  - Density: 338.19/km^{2} (875.90/sq mi)
- Time zone: UTC+10 (AEST)
  - Summer (DST): UTC+11 (AEDT)
- Postcode: 3350
- Mean max temp: 17.4 °C (63.3 °F)
- Mean min temp: 7.1 °C (44.8 °F)
- Annual rainfall: 688.7 mm (27.11 in)

Ballarat (/ˌbæləˈræt/ BAL-ə-RAT) (Wathawurrung: balla arat) is a city in the Central Highlands of Victoria, Australia. At the 2021 census, it had a population of 111,973, making it the third-largest urban inland city in Australia and the third-largest city in Victoria.

Within months of Victoria separating from the colony of New South Wales in 1851, gold was discovered near Ballarat, sparking the Victorian gold rush. Ballarat subsequently became a thriving boomtown that for a time rivalled Melbourne, the capital of Victoria, in terms of wealth and cultural influence. In 1854, following a period of civil disobedience in Ballarat over gold licenses, local miners launched an armed uprising against government forces. Known as the Eureka Rebellion, it led to the introduction of white male suffrage in Australia, and as such is interpreted as the origin of Australian democracy. The rebellion's symbol, the Eureka Flag, has become a national symbol.

Proclaimed a city on 9 September 1870, Ballarat's prosperity, unlike that of many other gold boomtowns, continued until the late 19th century, as the city's fields experienced sustained high gold yields for many decades. By the turn of the century, Ballarat's importance relative to Melbourne rapidly faded with the slowing of gold extraction. It has endured as a major regional centre and is the commercial capital and largest city of the Central Highlands, as well as a significant tourist destination. Ballarat is known for its history, culture and well-preserved colonial-era heritage, with much of the city subject to heritage overlays.

== History ==
=== Prehistory and European settlement ===
The Ballarat region was first populated by the Wadawurrung people, an Indigenous Australian people. The first Europeans to sight the area were an August 1837 party of six men, including Thomas Livingstone Learmonth and Henry Anderson, who scaled Mount Buninyong. Some of this party set off again in January 1838, this time with others including Thomas' brother Somerville Learmonth and William Cross Yuille and his cousin Archibald Buchanan Yuille.

The Yuille cousins arrived in 1838 and took up a 10,000-acre (4,000 ha) sheep run at Ballarat. The first houses were built near Woolshed Creek (Sebastopol) by Henry Anderson and taken over by the Yuilles. William Yuille established a hut on the northern edge of the swamp which would be called Yuille's Swamp, later Lake Wendouree. Archibald Yuille named his property "Ballaarat", from the local Wathaurong Aboriginal words, balla and arat, meaning a camping or 'resting place', with the word 'balla' meaning bent elbow. Both 'Ballaarat' and 'Ballarat' were used interchangeably until the present spelling was officially adopted by the City of Ballarat in 1994, when the city amalgamated with surrounding local government areas.

=== Gold rush era ===
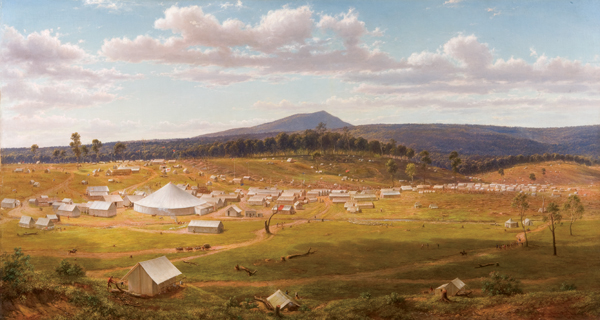
Painting by Eugene von Guerard of Ballarat's tent city in the summer of 1853–54

The first publicised discovery of gold in the region was by Thomas Hiscock on 2 August 1851, in Buninyong to the south. The find brought other prospectors to the area and on 19 August 1851, more gold was found at Poverty Point. Within days, a gold rush began, bringing thousands of prospectors to the Yarrowee Valley, which became known as the Ballarat diggings. Yields were particularly high, with the first prospectors in the area extracting between half an ounce (which was more than the average wage of the time) and up to five ounces of alluvial gold per day. As news of the Victorian gold rush reached the world, Ballarat gained an international reputation as a particularly rich goldfield. As a result, a huge influx of immigrants occurred, including many from Ireland and China, gathering in a collection of prospecting shanty towns around the creeks and hills. Within a few months, numerous alluvial runs were established, several deep mining leads began, and the population had swelled to over 1,000 people.

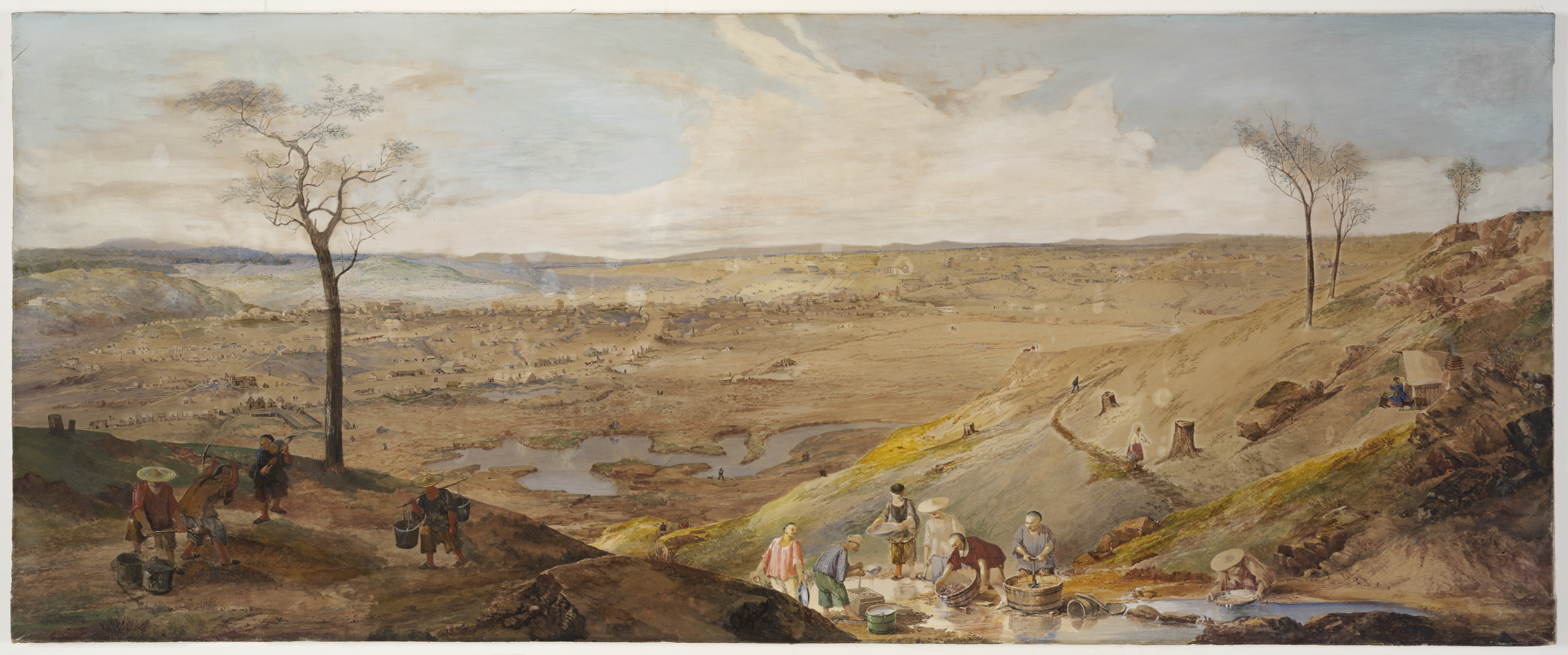
Bird's-eye view of Ballarat, Victoria, Australia, 1858, by George Rowe

The first post office opened on 1 November 1851, the first to open in a Victorian gold-mining settlement. Parts of the district were first surveyed by William Urquhart as early as October 1851. By 1852 his grid plan and wide streets for land sales in the new township of West Ballarat, built upon a plateau of basalt, contrasted markedly with the existing narrow unplanned streets, tents, and gullies of the original East Ballarat settlement. The new town's main streets of the time were named in honour of police commissioners and gold commissioners of the time, with the main street, Sturt Street, named after Evelyn Pitfield Shirley Sturt; Dana Street named after Henry Dana; Lydiard Street after his assistant; Doveton Street after Francis Crossman Doveton, Ballarat's first gold commissioner; Armstrong after David Armstrong; and Mair Street after William Mair. These officials were based at the government encampment (after which nearby Camp Street was named), which was strategically positioned on an escarpment with an optimal view over the district's diggings.

The first newspaper, The Banner, published on 11 September 1853, was one of many to be distributed during the gold-rush period. Print media played a large role in the early history of the settlement. Ballarat attracted a sizable number of miners from the Californian 1848 gold rush, and some were known as Ballafornians.

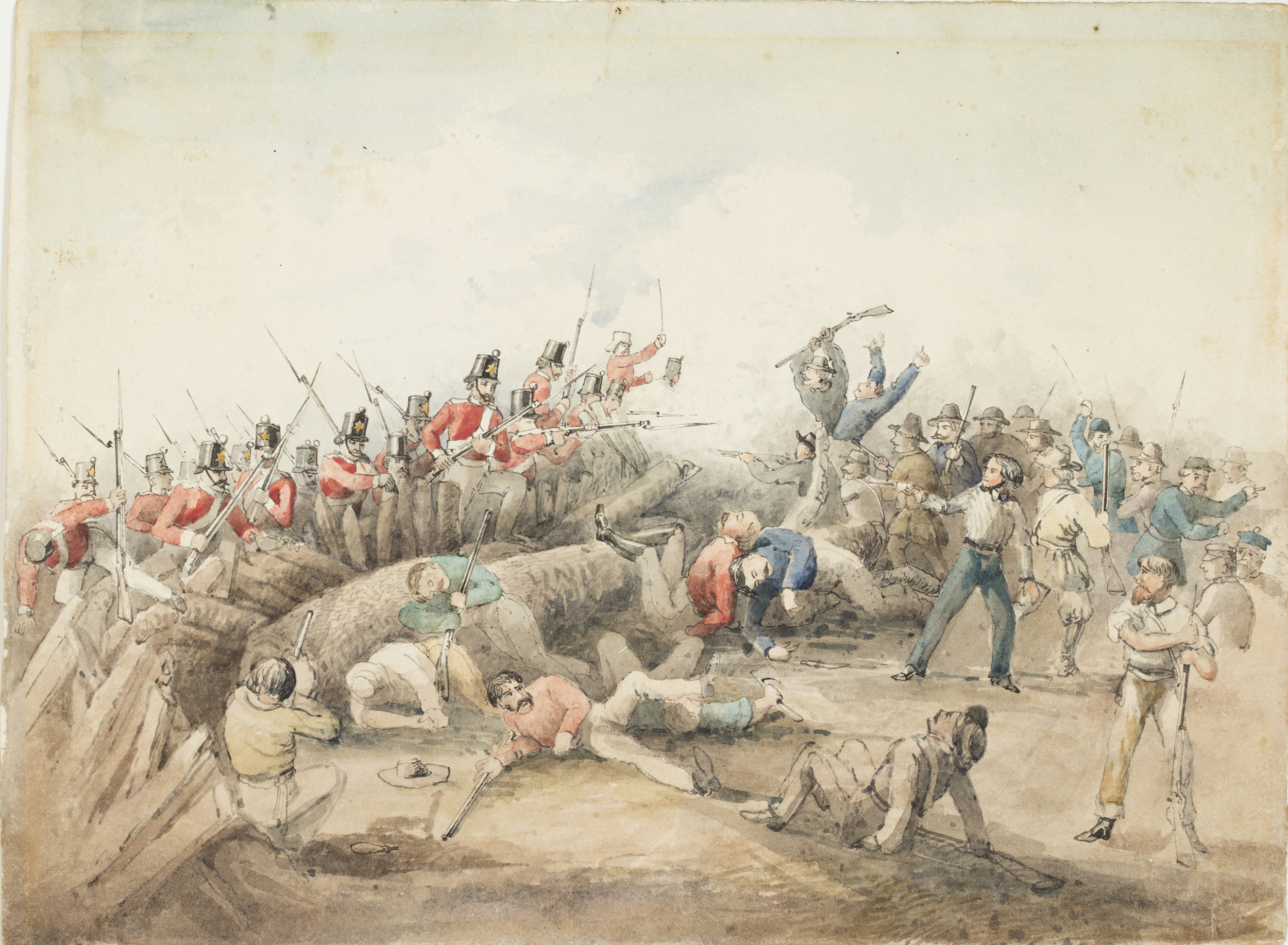
Troopers storm the rebels' stockade during the 1854 Eureka Rebellion.

Civil disobedience in Ballarat led to an armed civil uprising, the Eureka Rebellion (colloquially referred to as the "Eureka Stockade") which took place in Ballarat on 3 December 1854. The event, in which 22 miners were killed, is considered to be a defining moment in Australian history.

The city earned the nickname "The Golden City" in the 1850s. The gold rush population peaked at almost 60,000, mostly male diggers, by 1858. However, the early population was largely itinerant. As quickly as the alluvial deposits drew prospectors to Ballarat, the rate of gold extraction fluctuated and, as they were rapidly worked dry, many quickly moved to rush other fields as new findings were announced, particularly Mount Alexander in 1852, Fiery Creek in 1855, and Ararat in 1857. By 1859, a smaller number of permanent settlers numbering around 23,000, many of whom had built personal wealth in gold, established a prosperous economy based around a shift to deep underground gold mining.

Confidence of the city's early citizens in the enduring future of their city is evident in the sheer scale of many of the early public buildings, generous public recreational spaces, and opulence of many of its commercial establishments and private housing. A local steam locomotive industry developed from 1854 with the Phoenix Foundry operating until 1906. The railway came to the town with the opening of the Geelong–Ballarat line in 1862 and Ballarat developed as a major railway town. As the city grew the region's original indigenous inhabitants were quickly expelled to the fringe and by 1867 few remained.

=== Post gold rush ===
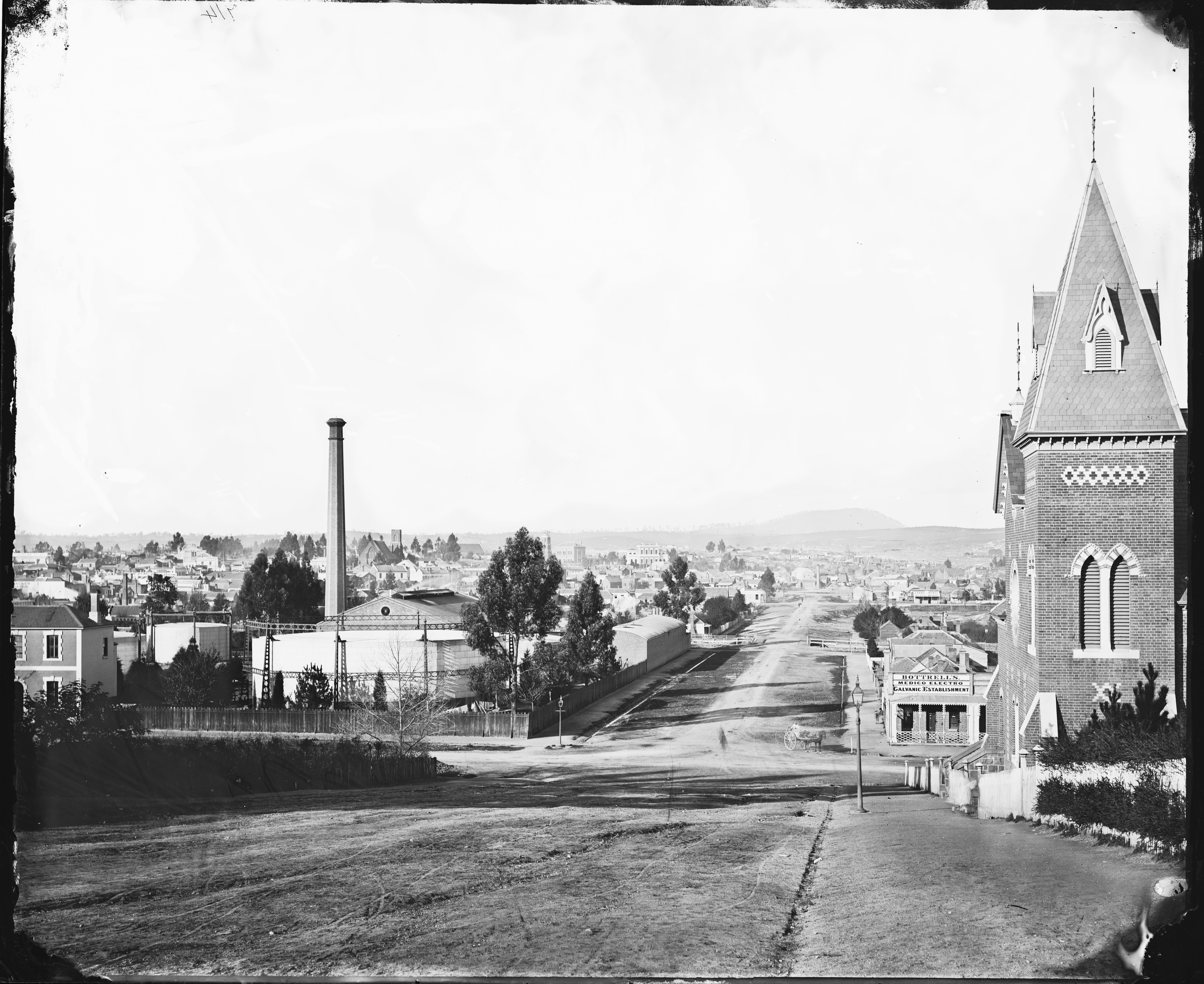
Dana Street, Ballarat, Victoria, Australia, c. 1872

From the late 1860s to the early 20th century, Ballarat made a successful transition from a gold rush town to an industrial-age city. The ramshackle tents and timber buildings gradually made way for permanent buildings, many impressive structures of solid stone and brick mainly built from wealth generated by early mining.

Prince Alfred, Duke of Edinburgh visited between 9 and 13 December 1867 and as the first royal visit, the occasion was met with great fanfare. The Prince Room was prepared at Craigs Royal Hotel for his stay. The city's first civic centre—Prince Alfred Hall—erected over the Yarrowee between the two municipalities, was named in his honour during his visit. The later attempt by Ballaratian Henry James O'Farrell to assassinate the Prince was met with shock and great horror from locals.

Ballarat was proclaimed a city in 1871. Gong Gong dam was built in 1877 to alleviate flooding and to provide a permanent water supply. A direct railway to Melbourne was completed in December 1889. Many industries and workshops had been established as a result of manufacturing and servicing for the deep lead mining industry.

=== 20th century ===
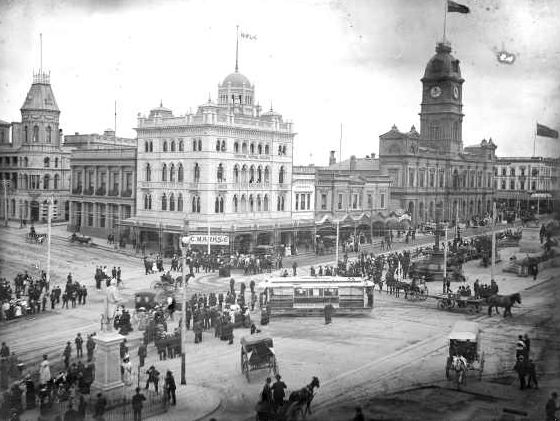
The intersection of Lydiard and Sturt streets, c. 1905, shows a bustling city of trams, horses and pedestrians.

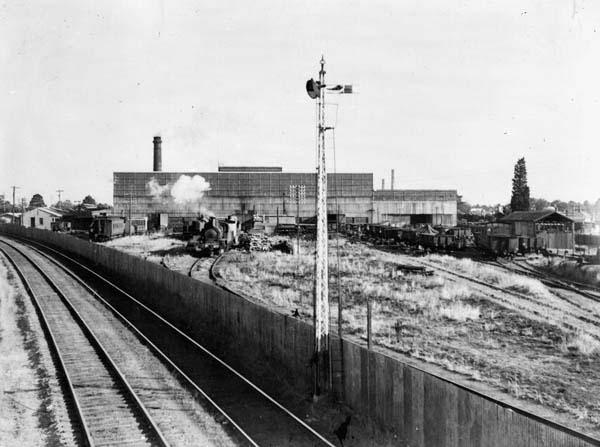
Development of the Ballarat North Workshops was a major initiative to capitalise on the city's burgeoning role as a railway town and transition from a declining gold mining industry.

Local boosters at the start of the 20th century adopted the nickname "Athens of Australia", first used to describe Ballarat by the jurist and politician Sir John Madden. The first electricity supply was completed in 1901, and that year a bluestone power station was built at the corner of Ripon Street and Wendouree Parade with the main aim of electrifying the city's tramway network. Despite such advancements, mining activity slowed at this time and Ballarat's growth all but stopped, leading to a decades-long period of decline. The Sunshine rail disaster in 1908 resulted in the death of dozens of Ballarat residents, and in August 1909, a great storm lashed the city, resulting in the death of one person and the injury of seven others, as well as the destruction of numerous homes.

Ballarat's significant representation in World War I resulted in heavy human loss. Around this time, it was overtaken in population by the port city of Geelong, further diminishing its provincial status. In response, local lobbyists continually pushed the Victorian government for decentralisation, the greatest success being the Victorian Railways opening the Ballarat North Workshops in April 1917. The Great Depression proved a further setback for Ballarat, with the closure of many institutions and causing the worst unemployment in the city's history, with over a thousand people in the dole queue.

The city's two municipalities, Ballarat East and West Town Councils, finally amalgamated in 1921 to form the City of Ballarat.

While deep, the depression was also brief. The interwar period proved a period of recovery for Ballarat with a number of major infrastructure projects well underway including a new sewerage system. In 1930, Ballarat Airport was established. By 1931, Ballarat's economy and population was recovering strongly with further diversification of industry, although in 1936 Geelong displaced it as the state's second largest city. During World War II an expanded Ballarat airport was the base of the RAAF Wireless Air Gunners' School as well as the base for USAAF Liberator bomber squadrons. In 1942, Ballarat became connected to the state electricity grid by a 66,000 kV line. Prior to this, power supply was generated locally.

During World War II, Ballarat was the location of RAAF No.1 Inland Aircraft Fuel Depot (IAFD), completed in 1942 in the defence of Australia against a Japanese invasion and decommissioned on 29 August 1944. Usually consisting of four tanks, 31 fuel depots were built across Australia for the storage and supply of aircraft fuel for the RAAF and the US Army Air Forces at a total cost of £900,000 ($1,800,000).

In the post-war era, Ballarat's growth continued. In response to an acute housing shortage, significant suburban expansion occurred. An extensive Housing Commission of Victoria estate was built on the former Ballarat Common (today known as Wendouree West). The estate was originally planned to contain over 750 prefabricated houses. While planning for the estate began in 1949, main construction occurred between 1951 and 1962.

The 1950s brought a new optimism to the city. On 17 April 1952 it was announced that Lake Wendouree was to be the venue for rowing events of the 1956 Summer Olympics, and work soon began on an Olympic village in Gillies Street. A new prefabricated power terminal substation at Norman Street Ballarat North was constructed between 1951 and 1953 by the State Electricity Commission. The first Begonia Festival, a highly successful community celebration, was held in 1953. Elizabeth II visited on 8 March 1954. The Civic Centre, Prince Alfred Hall had burned down suspiciously that year; however, a new Civic Hall was constructed and opened in March 1955. On 23 November 1956, the Olympic torch was carried through the city, and the following day the rowing events were held at the lake. On 2 March 1958 the Queen Mother visited Ballarat.

During the following decades, the city saw increased threats to its heritage. In 1964, the Ballarat City Council passed laws banning pillar-supported verandahs in the CBD, which threatened the removal of historic cast iron verandahs in the city. The by-law was met by staunch opposition from the National Trust, which had begun campaigning to protect some of the city's most historic buildings. By the 1970s, Ballarat began to officially recognise its substantial heritage, and the first heritage controls were recommended to ensure its preservation. With the opening of Sovereign Hill, the city made a rapid shift to become a major cultural tourist destination, visited by thousands each year.

During the 1970s, a further 300 houses were constructed at Wendouree West. Private housing in the adjacent suburb of Wendouree closely matched and eventually eclipsed this by the mid-1960s. The suburb of greater Wendouree and Wendouree West had evolved as the suburban middle-class heart of the city. Charles, Prince of Wales visited Ballarat on 28 October 1974 during which he toured Sovereign Hill, the Ballarat College of Advanced Education's new Mt Helen Campus and the White Swan Reservoir and spoke at Civic Hall.

Ballarat played an important role in the Stolen Generation throughout the 20th century, where the Ballarat Orphanage saw Aboriginal children who had been taken from their families. The Ballarat and District Aboriginal Co-operative (BADAC) was established by members of the Ballarat and district Aboriginal community in 1979. It became a co-operative to deliver health, social, welfare and community development programs to local Aboriginal people. In 2017, local Aboriginal community elder Ted Lovett was awarded the Order of Australia Medal for services to the indigenous community and for his works in eliminating racism in sports in south-west Victoria. Karen Heap and Ted Lovett were listed on the Victoria's Aboriginal Honour Role both in part for their work at BADAC.

=== 21st century ===
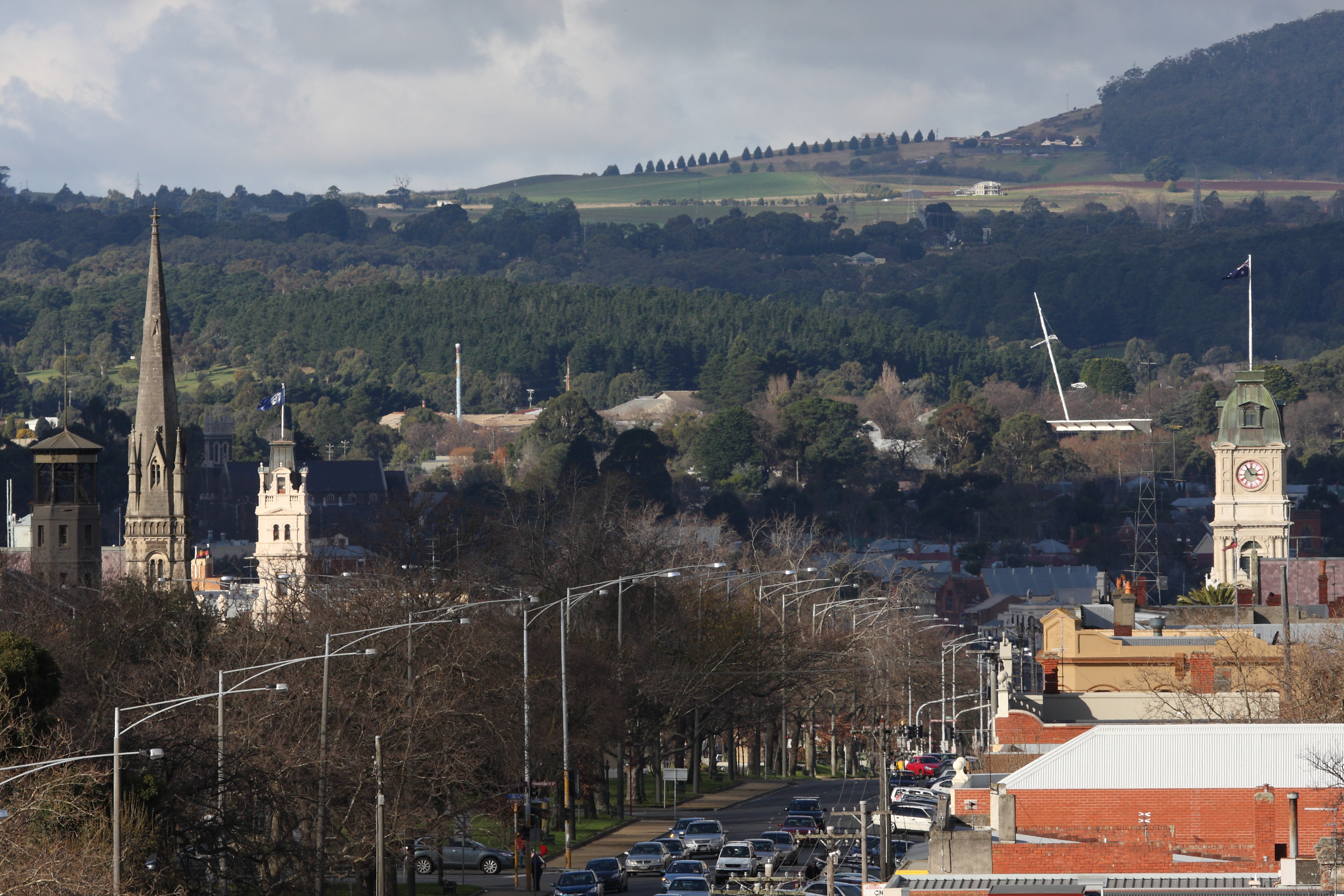
View of central Ballarat from St Peter's Anglican Church

The city continued to grow at the national average throughout the late 20th century and early 21st century. In 2008 the City of Ballarat released a plan directing that growth of the city over the next 30 years is to be concentrated to the west of the city centre. The Ballarat West Growth Area Plan was approved by the city and state government in 2010, planning an extensive fringe development consisting of 14,000 new homes and up to 40,000 new residents including new activity centres and employment zones.

The Royal Commission into Institutional Responses to Child Sexual Abuse final report, published on 15 December 2017, found that 139 people made a claim of child sexual abuse to the Diocese of Ballarat between 1980 and 2015, and 21 alleged perpetrators were identified in these claims. Seventeen of the 21 alleged and convicted perpetrators were priests, which is 8.7% of the priests who ministered during this period. About 45 victims are estimated to have committed suicide.

== Geography ==
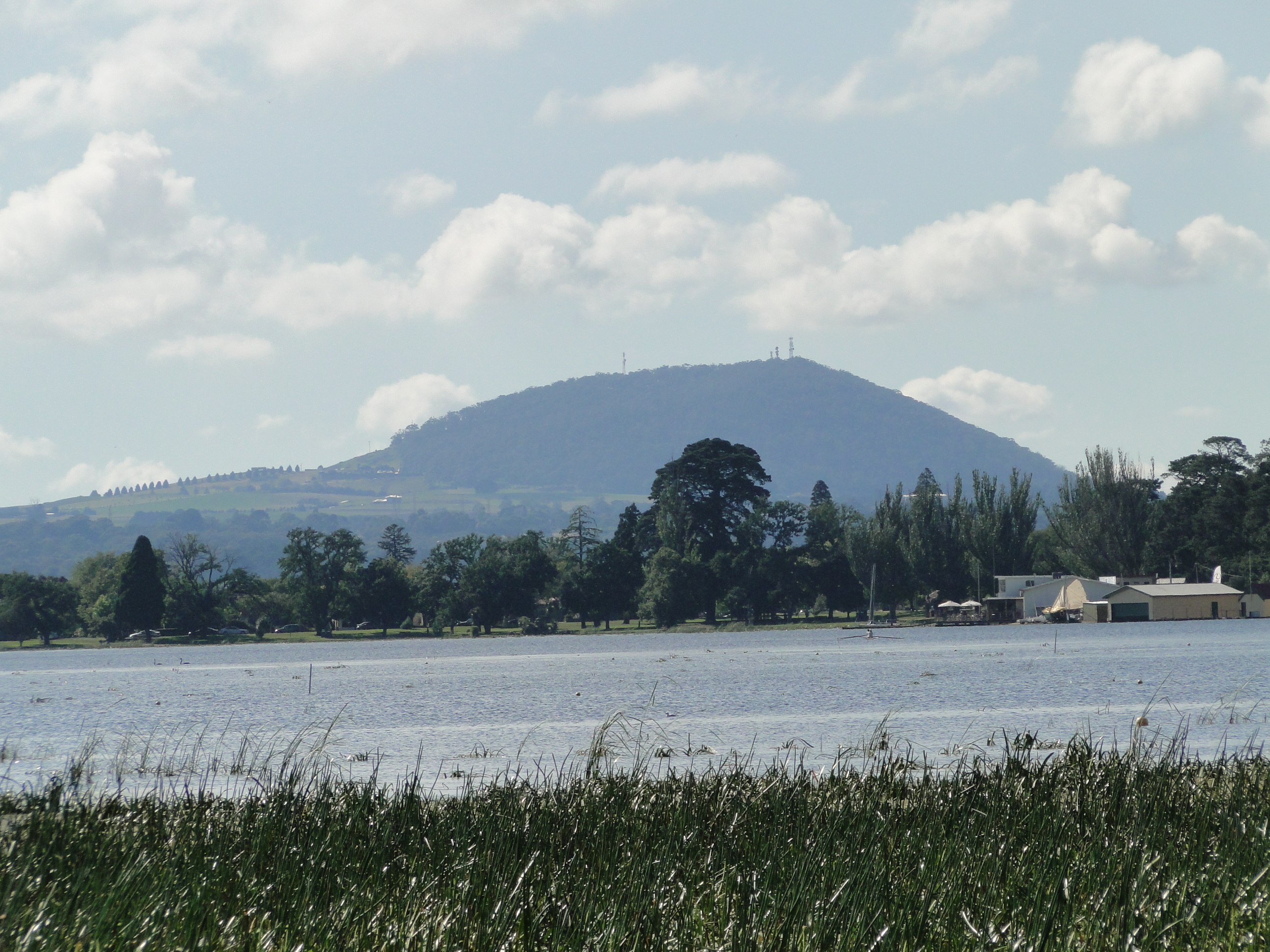
Ballarat's skyline is hidden from this view of the city looking east across Lake Wendouree to Mount Warrenheip.

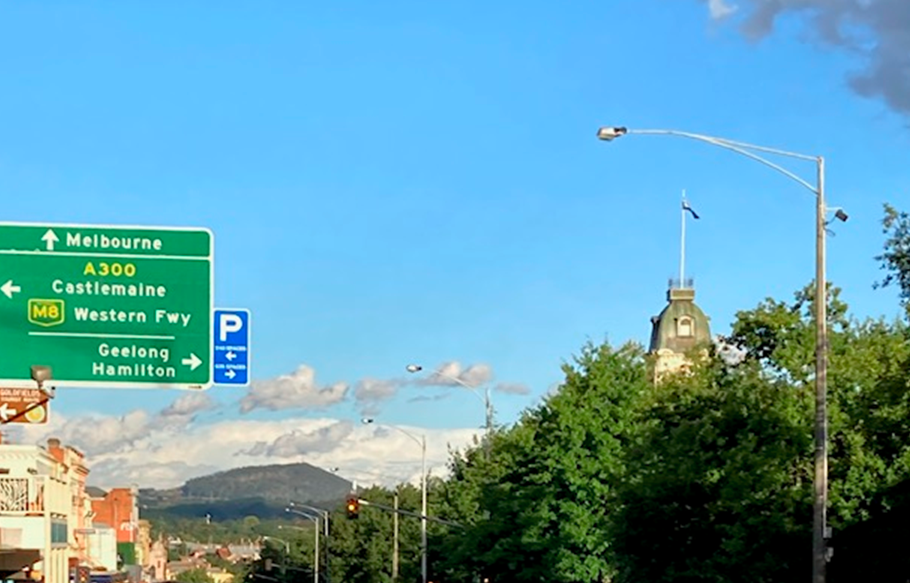
Mount Warrenheip dominating the skyline from Dawson Street, with the town hall clock tower on the right

Ballarat lies at the foothills of the Great Dividing Range in Central Western Victoria. Also known as the Central Highlands, it is named so because of its elevated position and moderate hills and terrain with a lack of any alpine mountains that are situated a few hundred kilometres NE. The city lies within a mostly gently undulating section of the midland volcanic plains which stretch from Creswick in the north, to Rokewood in the south, and from Lal Lal in the south-east to Pittong in the west.

Geologically, the area consists of alluvial sediment and volcanic flows originating from now-extinct volcanoes such as nearby Buninyong (750m, 2460 ft) and Warrenheip (746m, 2446 ft), which are the area's tallest peaks. As a result, the basin contains large areas of fertile agricultural soil. Ballarat itself is situated on an alluvial basin of the Yarrowee catchment and its tributary creeks, penetrated by sub-ranges of schists composed of granites and quartz. Along with the visible river and creeks, the catchment basin has numerous active and inactive aquifers and natural wetlands, which are used for urban water supply, agriculture and recreation.

There are numerous densely forested areas around Ballarat; however, due to historic wood milling and land clearing there remain no old-growth forests. The major natural bodies of water are in the west and include the former shallow swamps of Lake Wendouree which is central to the city's western suburbs and beyond Winter's Swamp and the large Lake Burrumbeet wetland complex. Almost all of the other numerous bodies of water have been created artificially and include several reservoirs, the largest being the White Swan Reservoir and smaller suburban lakes such as Lake Esmond.

The contiguous urban area of Ballarat covers approximately 90 km^{2} (35 sq mi) of the local government area's 740 km^{2} (286 sq mi). Approximately 90% of the urban area's land use is residential and suburban. From the city centre this area extends approximately 6 kilometres (4 miles) north to the hills around Invermay, approximately 7.5 km (4.7 mi) east to Leigh Creek in the foothills of Mount Warrenheip, approximately 7 km (4 mi) west along the plains to Lucas and approximately 8.5 km (5.3 mi) south along the Yarrowee River and Canadian Creek valley to the fringe of Buninyong. The central city is situated low in the valley of the Yarrowee River and surrounded by hills such that the city skyline is visible only from the hills and the lower lying inner eastern suburbs. The reach of the Yarrowee River toward Ballarat Central becomes a stormwater drain and is completely covered over as it flows under the CBD.

=== Urban structure ===
Map of the urban area (grey) and the extent of the municipal area

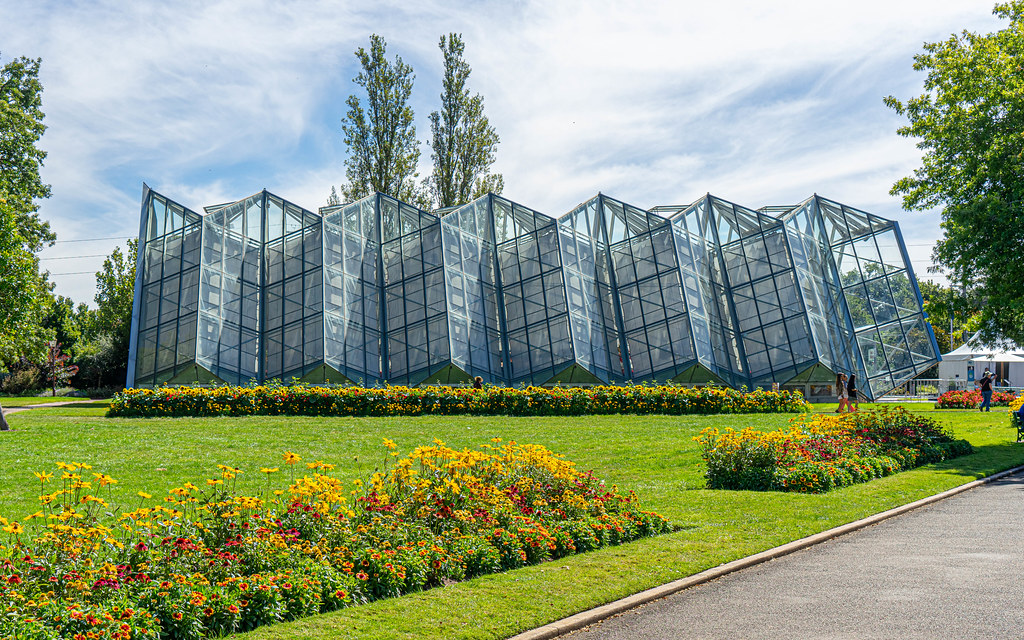
Robert Clark Conservatory at the Ballarat Botanical Gardens

The city is home to nationally significant heritage structures. These include the Ballarat Botanical Gardens (established 1857), with the greatest concentration of public statuary, the official Prime Ministers Avenue, the longest running lyric theatre building (Her Majesty's Theatre, established 1875), the first municipal observatory, established 1886, and the earliest and longest war memorial avenue (the Avenue of Honour, established between 1917 and 1919).

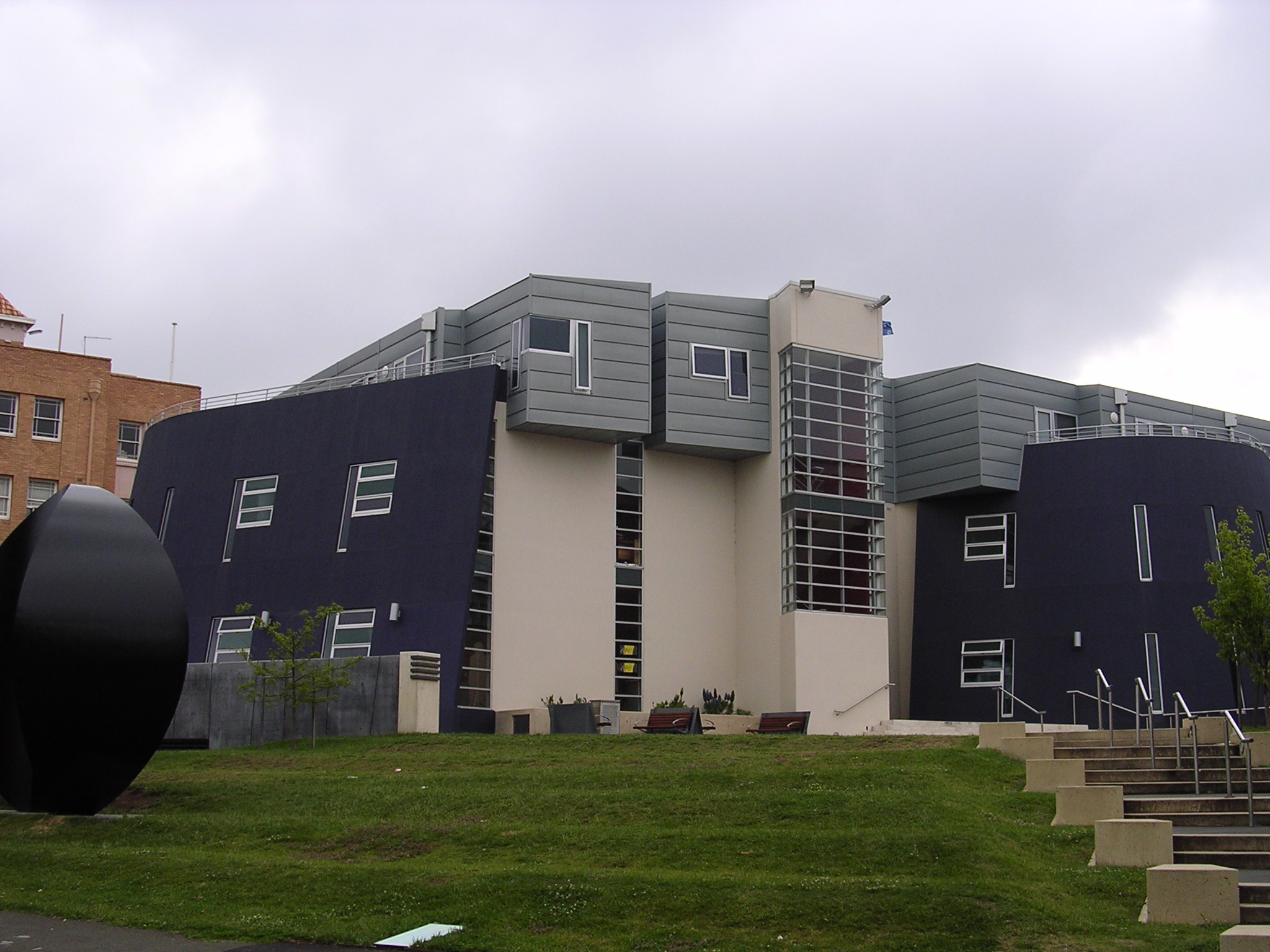
The centre of the city contrasts with the sprawling outer suburbs in that it is built up and public open spaces, like Alfred Deakin Place, are rare.

Ballarat is a primarily low-rise city. The City of Ballarat defines two Major Activity Centres within the urban area – the Central Business District (CBD) and Wendouree with a high concentration of business, retail and community function based primarily on the Melbourne 2030 planning model and a further 11 neighbourhood activity centres. The tallest buildings in urban Ballarat are all seven-storeys. This includes Lyons Place, a seven-storey hi-rise residential tower (2025), the seven-storey Henry Bolte wing of the Ballarat Base Hospital (1994) and the Ballarat Base Hospital redevelopment under construction (estimated completion 2027). Other tall office buildings include the five-storey GovHub (2021), Ballarat Regional Integrated Cancer Centre (2013), MLC building (1957) and Ballarat State Offices (1941). Beyond the central area, urban Ballarat extends into several suburban areas with a mixture of housing styles. Predominant styles are 19th-century villas, Victorian terraces, Federation homes and Georgian red brick homes. Settlement patterns around Ballarat consist of small villages and country towns, some with less than a few thousand people.

The central business district (located in Ballarat Central) is a large mixed-use office and retail district bounded to the north by railway lines, to the west by Drummond Street, to the south to Grant Street and to the east by Princes Street and spanning the floodplain of the Yarrowee River. Lydiard, Sturt Streets, Armstrong, Doveton, Dana Street and Bridge Street (known as Bridge Mall) along with the historic centre of East Ballarat—Main Street and Bakery Hill have retained stands of commercial and civic buildings of state and national heritage significance.

The inner established suburbs were initially laid out around the key mining areas and include Ballarat East, Bakery Hill, Golden Point, Soldiers Hill, Black Hill, Brown Hill, Eureka, Canadian, Mount Pleasant, Redan, Sebastopol and Newington.

The post gold rush era has seen a boom in expansion, extending the conurbation north, south and west. To the west, Ballarat has expanded West to Lucas, Alfredton, Delacombe To The North West Wendouree, Wendouree West and Miners Rest To the north it has expanded to Ballarat North, Invermay Park, Invermay, Victoria Invermay and Nerrina; to the east to Warrenheip and south to Sebastopol, Mount Clear and Mount Helen with the urban area encroaching the large town of Buninyong.

Wendouree is currently the only major suburban activity centre with a large indoor shopping mall—Stockland Shopping Centre (expanded in 2007) and also has a number of surrounding retail parks including a strip shopping centre along Howitt Street including the large retail chain Harvey Norman. Elsewhere are small suburban hubs with supermarkets such as IGA (supermarkets) and small stretches of shopfronts.

Unlike Melbourne, Ballarat does not have a defined urban growth boundary. This has put continuing pressure on the city council to approve development applications for subdivisions outside of the city fringe. In response to lobbying by landholders, the Ballarat West Growth Area Plan, a major greenfield land development plan, was prepared and has approved by the city and state government to allow for planned fringe communities consisting of 14,000 new homes and up to 40,000 new residents, effectively doubling the city's urban area by extending the urban sprawl from Sebastopol, Delacombe and Alfredton west toward Bonshaw, Smythes Creek and Cardigan with a new suburb to be known as Lucas to be created. New activity centres have been developed at Delacombe and Alfredton.

=== Architecture ===
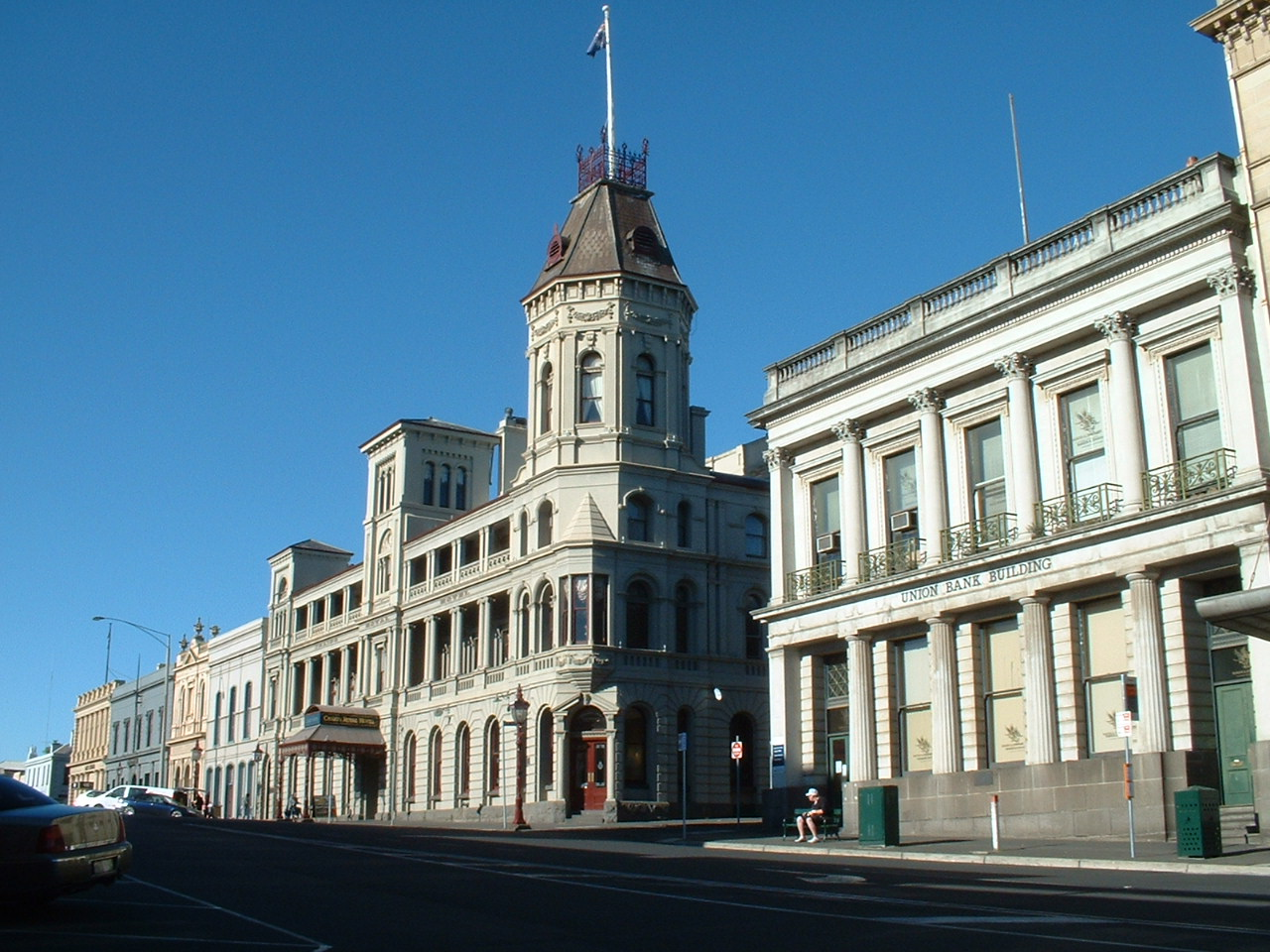
Victorian era buildings

Ballarat is renowned for its Victorian architectural heritage. In 2003 Ballarat was the first of two Australian cities to be registered as a member of the International League of Historical Cities and in 2006 hosted the 10th World League of Historical Cities Congress. The city's history is a major focus of the Collaborative Research Centre in Australian History, part of Federation University Australia, and is located at old Ballarat Gaol.

The legacy of the wealth generated during Ballarat's gold boom is still visible in a large number of fine stone buildings in and around the city, especially in the Lydiard Street area. This precinct contains some of Victoria's finest examples of Victorian era buildings, many of which are on the Victorian Heritage Register or classified by the National Trust of Australia. Notable civic buildings include the Town Hall (1870–72), the former Post Office (1864), the Ballarat Fine Art Gallery (1887), the Mechanics' Institute (1860, 1869), the Queen Victoria Wards of the Ballarat Base Hospital (1890s) and the Ballarat railway station (1862, 1877, 1888). Other historic buildings include the Provincial Hotel (1909), Reid's Coffee Palace (1886), Craig's Royal Hotel (1862–1890) and Her Majesty's Theatre (1875), the oldest intact and operating lyric theatre in Australia and Ballarat Fire Station (1864, 1911) one of Victoria's oldest fire fighting structures and the Jewish synagogue (1861) the oldest surviving synagogue on the Australian mainland.

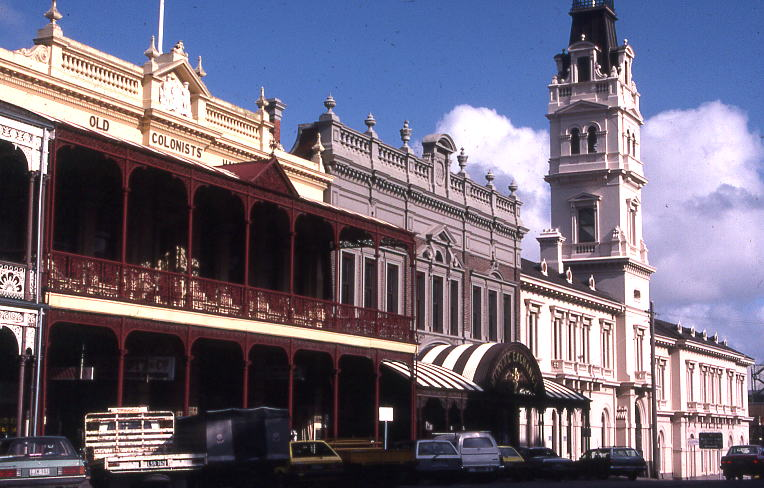
Streetscape with the former post office at the rear

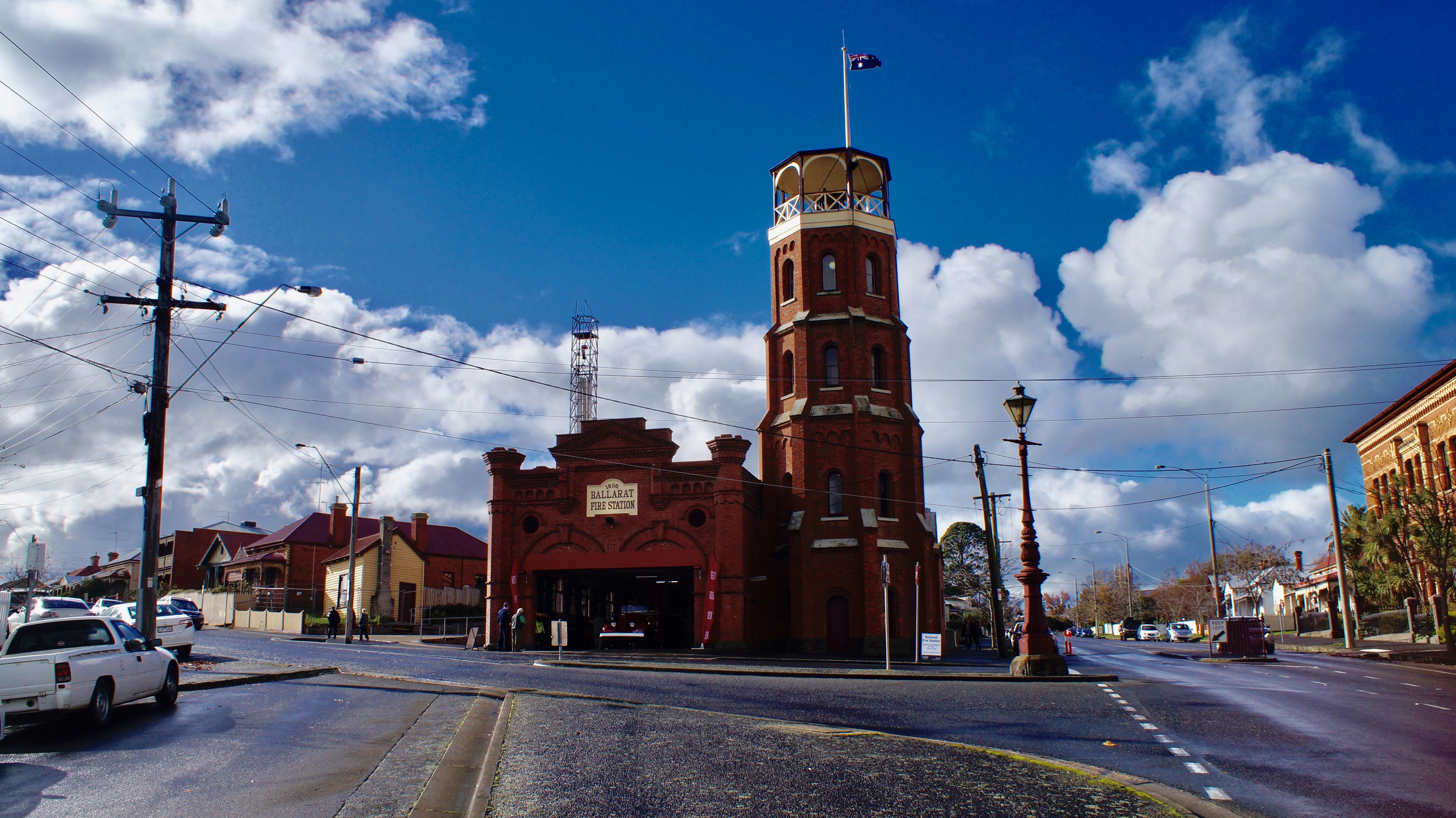
Ballarat East Fire Station, the oldest continually operating fire station in the Southern Hemisphere, and the site of the first operational telephone, made by Henry Sutton

Restoration of historic buildings is encouraged including a low interest council Heritage Loans Scheme. and the prevention of demolition by neglect discouraged by council policies. Since the 1970s, the local council has become increasingly aware of the economic and social value of heritage preservation. This is in stark contrast to the 1950s and 60s when Ballarat followed Melbourne in encouraging the removal of Victorian buildings, verandahs in particular. Recent restoration projects funded by the Ballarat include the reconstruction of significant cast iron lace verandahs including the Mining Exchange, Art Gallery (2007), Mechanics institute (2005–) on Lydiard Street and in 2010 the restoration of the Town Hall and the long neglected Unicorn Hotel façade on Sturt Street.

Ballarat Citizens for Thoughtful Development formed in 1998 and was incorporated as Ballarat Heritage Watch in 2005 to ensure that the city's architectural heritage is given due consideration in the planning process.

The Ballarat Botanical Gardens (established in 1858) are recognised as the finest example of a regional botanical gardens in Australia and are home to many heritage listed exotic tree species and feature a modern glasshouse and horticultural centre and the Prime Ministers Avenue which features bronze busts of every past Australian Prime Minister.

Ballarat is notable for its very wide boulevards. The main street is Sturt Street with over 2 kilometres (1.2 miles) of central gardens known as the Sturt Street Gardens featuring bandstands, fountains, statues, monuments, memorials and lampposts. Ballarat is home to the largest of a collection of Avenues of Honour in Victoria. The 15-kilometre-long (9.3-mile) Ballarat Avenue of Honour consists of a total of approximately 4,000 trees, mostly deciduous which in many parts arch completely over the road. Each tree has a bronze plaque dedicated to a soldier from the Ballarat region who enlisted during World War I. The Avenue of Honour and the Arch of Victory are on the Victorian Heritage Register and are seen by approximately 20,000 visitors each year.

The city also has the greatest concentration of public statuary in any Australian city with many parks and streets featuring sculptures and statues dating from the 1860s to the present. Some of the other notable memorials located in the Sturt Street Gardens in the middle of Ballarat's main boulevard include a bandstand situated in the heart of the city that was funded and built by the City of Ballarat Band in 1913 as a tribute to the bandsmen of the RMS Titanic, a fountain dedicated to the early explorers Burke and Wills, and those dedicated to monarchs and those who have played pivotal roles in the development of the city and its rich social fabric. These include, Robert Burns, Peter Lalor, Sir Albert Coates, Harold "Pompey" Elliott, William Dunstan, King George V, Queen Victoria and more.

Ballarat has an extensive array of significant war memorials, the most recent of which is the Australian Ex Prisoner of War Memorial. The most prominent memorial in the city is the Ballarat Victory Arch that spans the old Western Highway on the Western approaches of the city. The archway serves as the focal point for the Avenue of Honour. Other significant individual monuments located along Sturt Street include those dedicated to the Boer War (1899–1901), the World War II (1939–1945) cenotaph, and Vietnam (1962–1972) (located adjacent to the Arch of Victory).

== Climate ==
Spring snowfall on the Petersen Fountain in Sturt Street Gardens, September 2020.

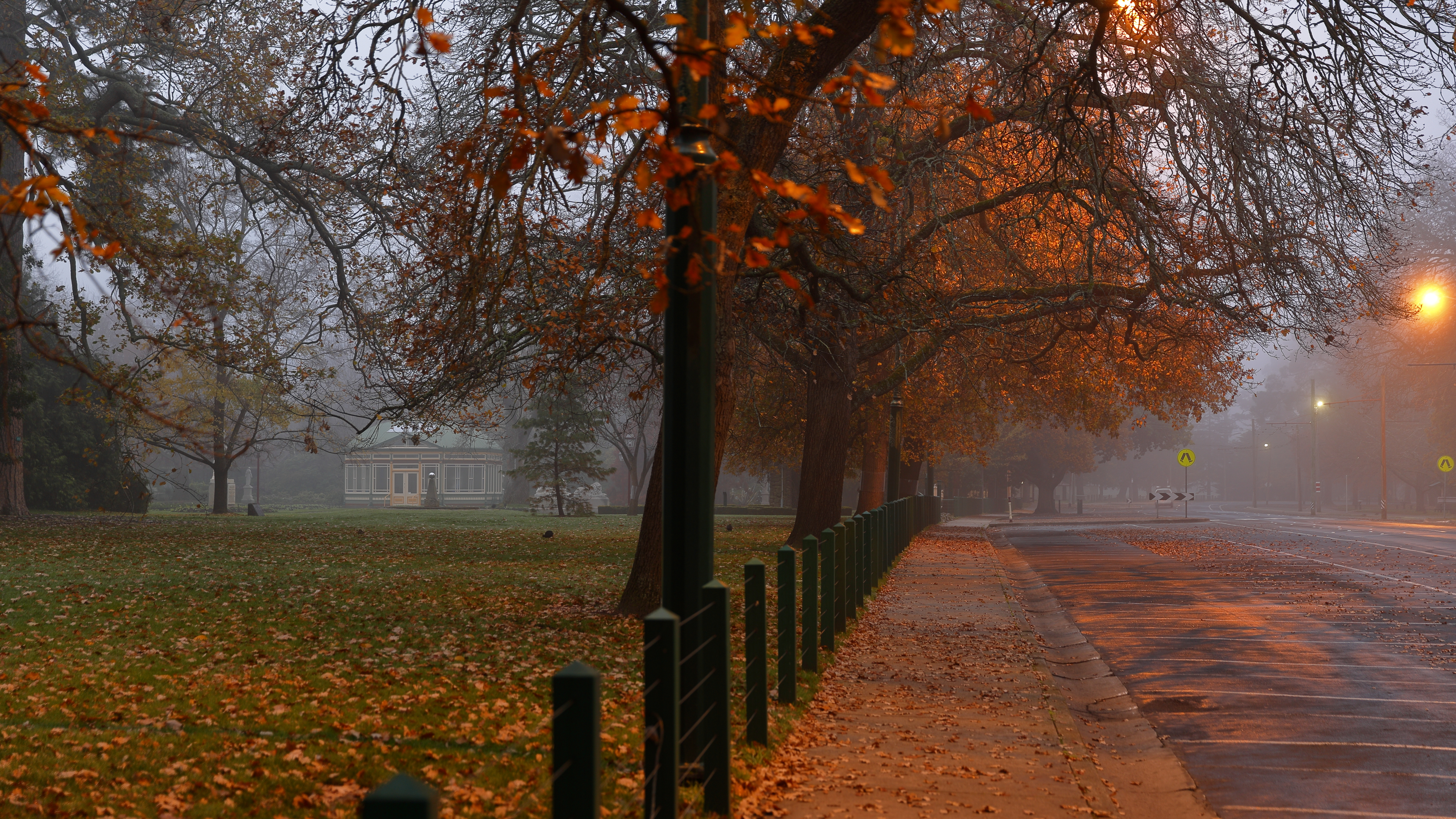
Fog is common on autumn and winter mornings but usually dissipates by mid-morning.

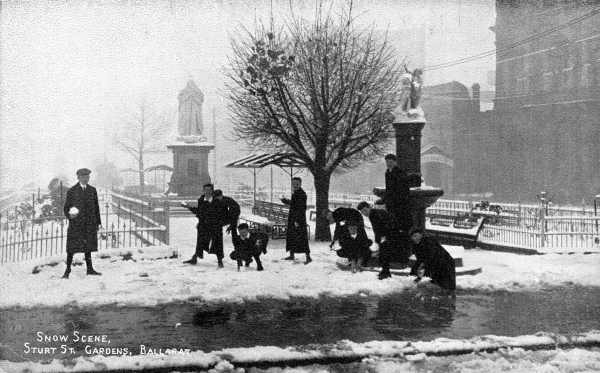
Snowy scene in Sturt Gardens in 1905

Ballarat has a moderate oceanic climate (Köppen climate classification Cfb) with four distinct seasons. Its elevation, ranging between 400 and 630 metres (1,310 and 2,070 feet) above sea level, causes its mean monthly temperatures to tend to be on average 3 to 5 °C (5 to 9 °F) below those of Melbourne, especially in winter. The mean daily maximum temperature for January is 25.1 °C (77 °F), while the mean minimum is 10.9 °C (52 °F). In July, the mean maximum is 10.0 °C (50 °F); average July minimum is 3.2 °C (38 °F). Ballarat has 55.2 clear days annually, with the grand majority in summer and early autumn. Ballarat has very rainy winters.

The city has a reputation for unpredictable and extreme weather, ranging from snowfall to intense heatwaves. Perhaps the most infamous feature of Ballarat's climate is the chilly winter, often accentuated by driving winds. In 2023, a journalist for ABC Ballarat wrote that Ballarat "is notorious for its frosty winters and the near year-round puffer jacket uniform of its residents". When measured by mean temperatures, Ballarat is the coldest city in Victoria.

Temperatures can dip below freezing from May to September; however, a low of 0–2 °C is more common – widespread frosts and fog are a regular sight. Snowfall typically falls on nearby Mount Buninyong and Mount Warrenheip several times a year, but in the urban area only once or twice, particularly during heavy winters. Snow has been known to fall heavily with several centimetres accumulating even in the CBD. Heavy snow seasons occurred in 1900–1902 and 1905–1907 (with record falls in 1906), and moderate snow seasons were recorded during the 1940s and 1980s. Snowfalls in the urban area have occurred in recent years: November 2006 (light), July 2007 (heavy), June 2008 (light), August 2008 (light), August 2014 (moderate) and June 2016 (light), July 2017 (light), June 2018 (moderate), May 2019 (light), and August and September 2020 (light and heavy).

The mean annual rainfall is 693 millimetres (27.3 inches), with August being the wettest month (75 mm or 3.0 in). There are an average of 198 rain-free days per year. Like much of Australia, Ballarat experiences cyclical drought and heavy rainfall. Flooding of the Yarrowee catchment occurs occasionally. In 1869 a serious flood of the Yarrowee River put most of the lower section of the business district including Bridge and Grenville streets under water and caused the loss of two lives. Prolonged drought (an average annual rainfall with falls averaging as low as 400 mm (16 in) per year since 2001) caused Lake Wendouree to dry up completely for the first time in its history between 2006 and 2007. More recently higher rainfall levels have been recorded including 95.0 mm (3.74 in) in the 24 hours to 9 am on 14 January 2011, ending a four-day period of flooding rains across much of Victoria and Tasmania, and contributing to the wettest January on record, with a total of 206.0 mm (8.11 in) of rain for the month.

The city's mean daily wind run is 470 km, almost twice that of Melbourne, making it one of the windiest cities in Australia. This in turn causes even the warm summer days to feel substantially cooler, and near-freezing winter days to have a far below zero wind chill.

Ballarat's highest recorded temperature was 44.1 °C (111 °F) on 7 February 2009 during the 2009 southeastern Australia heat wave. The lowest recorded temperature was −6.0 °C (21 °F) on 21 July 1982.

Climate data for Ballarat Aerodrome 37.51°S 143.79°E, elev. 435 m (1,427 ft) (1991–2020, extremes 1951–2025)
Month	Jan	Feb	Mar	Apr	May	Jun	Jul	Aug	Sep	Oct	Nov	Dec	Year
Record high °C (°F)	42.0 (107.6)	44.1 (111.4)	37.9 (100.2)	32.2 (90.0)	26.1 (79.0)	21.6 (70.9)	19.1 (66.4)	23.0 (73.4)	27.9 (82.2)	33.4 (92.1)	37.3 (99.1)	43.5 (110.3)	44.1 (111.4)
Mean maximum °C (°F)	38.1 (100.6)	36.1 (97.0)	32.4 (90.3)	26.7 (80.1)	20.1 (68.2)	15.4 (59.7)	14.1 (57.4)	16.7 (62.1)	21.7 (71.1)	26.7 (80.1)	31.1 (88.0)	35.0 (95.0)	39.0 (102.2)
Mean daily maximum °C (°F)	26.2 (79.2)	25.7 (78.3)	22.9 (73.2)	18.4 (65.1)	14.2 (57.6)	11.3 (52.3)	10.5 (50.9)	11.8 (53.2)	14.1 (57.4)	17.3 (63.1)	20.5 (68.9)	23.4 (74.1)	18.0 (64.4)
Daily mean °C (°F)	18.9 (66.0)	18.7 (65.7)	16.4 (61.5)	12.7 (54.9)	9.7 (49.5)	7.5 (45.5)	6.8 (44.2)	7.5 (45.5)	9.3 (48.7)	11.6 (52.9)	14.3 (57.7)	16.4 (61.5)	12.5 (54.5)
Mean daily minimum °C (°F)	11.6 (52.9)	11.6 (52.9)	9.9 (49.8)	7.0 (44.6)	5.1 (41.2)	3.6 (38.5)	3.0 (37.4)	3.1 (37.6)	4.4 (39.9)	5.9 (42.6)	8.0 (46.4)	9.4 (48.9)	6.9 (44.4)
Mean minimum °C (°F)	4.8 (40.6)	4.9 (40.8)	2.9 (37.2)	0.3 (32.5)	−1.2 (29.8)	−2.2 (28.0)	−2.8 (27.0)	−2.2 (28.0)	−1.7 (28.9)	−0.7 (30.7)	1.5 (34.7)	2.6 (36.7)	−3.5 (25.7)
Record low °C (°F)	0.7 (33.3)	−1.4 (29.5)	−0.6 (30.9)	−4.1 (24.6)	−4.5 (23.9)	−4.6 (23.7)	−6.0 (21.2)	−5.0 (23.0)	−4.6 (23.7)	−3.6 (25.5)	−1.0 (30.2)	−1.0 (30.2)	−6.0 (21.2)
Average rainfall mm (inches)	45.1 (1.78)	39.5 (1.56)	31.5 (1.24)	42.4 (1.67)	50.4 (1.98)	60.2 (2.37)	61.4 (2.42)	66.5 (2.62)	69.2 (2.72)	53.8 (2.12)	54.5 (2.15)	46.2 (1.82)	620.9 (24.44)
Average rainy days (≥ 0.2 mm)	7.7	6.9	8.5	11.7	15.8	18.2	19.9	18.6	16.8	14.5	11.7	10.4	160.7
Average afternoon relative humidity (%) (at 3 PM)	43	43	46	54	67	77	75	71	65	58	55	47	58
Average dew point °C (°F)	9.0 (48.2)	9.2 (48.6)	7.8 (46.0)	6.7 (44.1)	6.9 (44.4)	6.2 (43.2)	5.2 (41.4)	5.1 (41.2)	5.9 (42.6)	6.4 (43.5)	7.8 (46.0)	8.1 (46.6)	7.0 (44.6)
Source: Australian Bureau of Meteorology (dew point at 3 PM)

== Environment ==
=== Natural reserves and commons ===
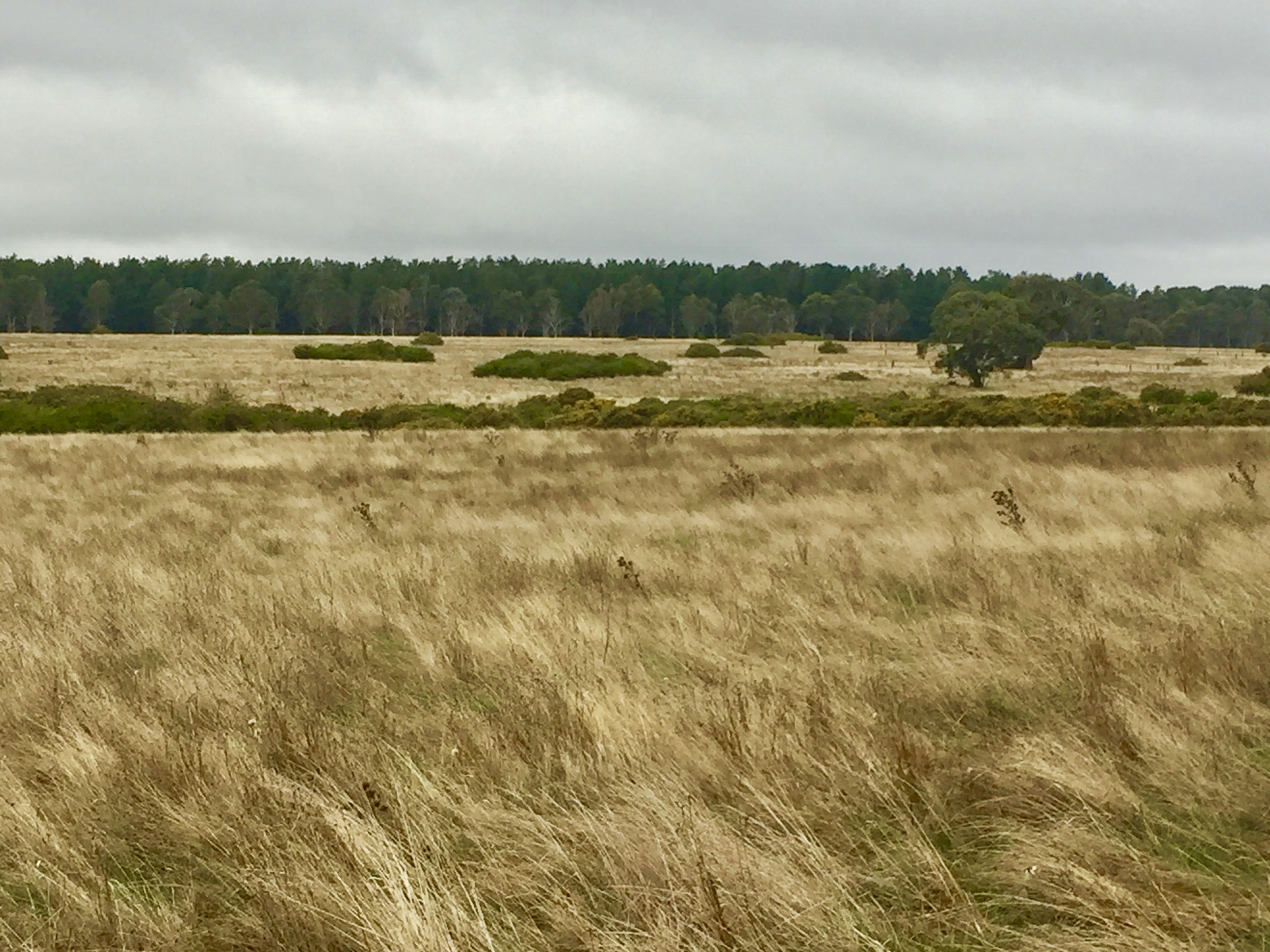
Ballarat Town Common in autumn 2018

While there are no national parks in Ballarat's proximity, Ballarat is bordered by extensive bushland to the north, south and south west and sensitive wetlands to the east. The most central park to the city is the 130 ha Victoria Park, with a plethora of ovals and fields, playgrounds, walking tracks and quiet roads. There are a number of nearby state parks and large reserves including the Enfield State Park, Creswick Regional Park, Mount Warrenheip Flora Reserve, Mount Buninyong Reserve and Lake Burrumbeet park. There are also smaller parks, like Black Hill, Victoria Park, Pioneer Park and Yarowee Reserve, located within walking distance of the city centre.

Ballarat is unique in Australia—and internationally—for having retained much of its commons land, which can be used by any resident of Ballarat. Ballarat Town Common, Ballarat West Town Common and Ballarat Common are located to the west of the city. Ballarat Town Common can be accessed via Howe Street in Miners Rest and is used by dog walkers and ramblers, especially because of its open grass fields and native wetland. Ballarat West Town Common is presently farmed on by licensed farmers. The commons were reduced in size during the 20th century for property development.

The region is home to a large koala population with protected areas established in the city's outer southern and eastern settlements.

=== Pollution ===
Air quality in Ballarat is generally good, but dust is sometimes an issue in the summer, and woodsmoke from fireplaces contributes to reductions in visibility in the winter. Ballarat's waterways have historically been affected by heavy pollution from both mining and industry.

The Ballarat Environment Network formed in 1993 to provide a voice for environmental and nature conservation issues in Ballarat and its surroundings. Another large lobby group for sustainability in the city is the Ballarat Renewable Energy And Zero Emissions (BREAZE) formed in 2006. The City of Ballarat released an Environment Sustainability Strategy for the city in 2007.

Many parts of urban Ballarat have been affected by the introduction of exotic species, particularly introduced flora. Common gorse is one such problem which has prompted the formation of an official Ballarat Region Gorse Task Force in 1999 to control. European rabbits and red foxes cause significant environmental damage in the region's agriculture areas.

== Economy ==
The economy of Ballarat is driven by all three economic sectors, though contemporary Ballarat has emerged as a primarily service economy with its main industry being the service industry and its key areas of business including tourism, hospitality, retail, professional services, government administration and education. Secondary sector including manufacturing, which had grown in the 20th century remains an important sector. The city's historic primary sector roots including mining and agriculture continue to play a role, though one that has declined since the 20th century. Industries emerging this century include information technology service sector and renewable energy.

=== Service industries ===
As a major service centre for the populous goldfields region, the main sectors of employment include retail, professional services and trades as well as state and federal government branch offices for public services and health care and non-government service organisations.

Ballarat is the main retail economy in the region. The city has several key retail districts including a pedestrian mall known as Bridge Mall comprising over 100 traders. There are also indoor shopping malls including Central Square Shopping Centre and Stockland Wendouree, better known as Wendouree Village, with a large number of specialty stores. Major department stores include Myer, Target, Big W, Kmart, Harvey Norman and Harris Scarfe. Additionally each of the major supermarkets (Coles, Woolworths, IGA and Aldi) are represented. Servicing the financial sector are branches of the big four Australian retail banks (National Australia Bank, ANZ, Commonwealth Bank and Westpac) along with Bendigo & Adelaide Bank and St George Bank and a number of smaller independent financial services firms.

Federation University Australia exports education through a large international students program and throughout Australia through distance education programs.

In recent years, a large technology park, the Ballarat Technology Park with communications centre has been established, with tenants including IBM and employing over 1,400 people.

Ballarat West Employment Zone (BWEZ) is located on the north-west fringe of Ballarat, adjacent to the Ballarat Airport, existing rail infrastructure and the Ballarat Western Link Road. Ballarat West Employment Zone (BWEZ) will become the engine room for jobs and economic growth in Ballarat over the next 20 years. The project involves the development of surplus Crown Land for industrial, wholesale, logistics, construction, commercial and residential uses, encouraging employment growth in Ballarat and the surrounding region. BWEZ will also include a freight hub, secure infrastructure and access to road, rail and ports. Businesses located in BWEZ include CHS Broadbent, Westlab Pty Ltd, Agrimac, Milestone Benchtops, Kane Transport and Office Vision.

==== Tourism and hospitality ====
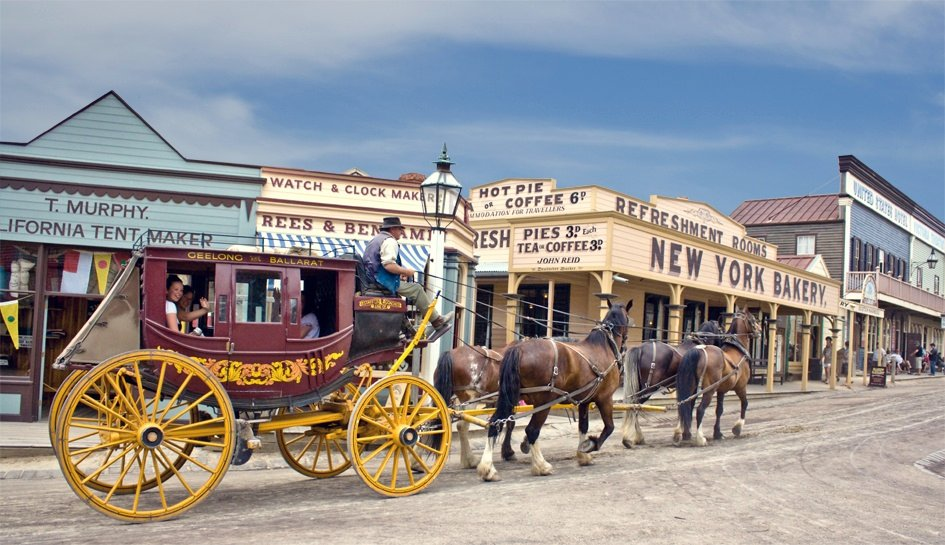
Main Street in Sovereign Hill, a large open-air gold mining museum, is Ballarat's most famous attraction.

Ballarat attracts 2.2 million visitors a year. The tourism and hospitality industry is a A$480 million a year sector, which accounts for around 15% of Ballarat's economy and employs around 2,870 people. Tourism in Ballarat is promoted by Ballarat Regional Tourism.

A significant heritage tourism industry has grown substantially in Ballarat since the 1960s. Ballarat is most notable for the award-winning open-air museum known as Sovereign Hill, a recreated 1850s gold mining settlement opened in 1970. Sovereign Hill is Ballarat's biggest tourism drawcard and is consistently rated among the best outdoor museums in the world and continues to expand. Sovereign Hill accounts for over half a million of Ballarat's visitors and $40 million in tourism revenue.

Several businesses and attractions have capitalised on Ballarat's gold mining history. They include Kryal Castle (1972), "Gold Rush Mini Golf" (2002) featuring the "Big Miner" (2006) one of Australia's big things (although the original proposal appeared larger and for the miner to hold the Eureka Flag) at Ballarat's eastern entrance.

Other tourist attractions include the Eureka Centre; The Gold Museum, Ballarat; Ballarat Botanic gardens and Lake Wendouree; the Ballarat Tramway Museum and Ballarat Wildlife Park. A large number of Ballarat hotels, motels and restaurants service the tourism industry. The Ballarat Tourist Association is an industry based non-profit, membership organisation representing the city's tourism industry.

Ballarat hosts a number of annual festivals with historical and cultural focus including the Ballarat Begonia Festival, Ballarat Heritage Weekend and Ballarat Beat Rockabilly Festival.

=== Manufacturing ===
According to the 2021 Australian census, manufacturing is Ballarat's sixth largest employment sector, accounting for 7% of all workers.

Ballarat attracts investment from several international manufacturers. The Australian headquarters of Mars, Incorporated was established in Ballarat in 1979 with the main Ballarat factory producing popular confectionery including Mars bars, Snickers and M&M's for the Australian market as well as expanding in 2013 to produce Maltesers. McCain Foods Limited Australian headquarters was established in Ballarat in 1970 and the company continues to expand its operations. The Ballarat North Workshops is a major manufacturer of public transportation products with current investment from Alstom.

Ballarat also has a large number of home-grown companies producing textiles, general industrial engineering, food products, brick and tiles, building components, prefabricated housing components and automotive components. Brewing was once a large-scale operation, with many large businesses including the public company Phoenix Brewery, and although large-scale brewing has ceased, the city retains a substantial microbrewery industry.

=== Primary sector ===
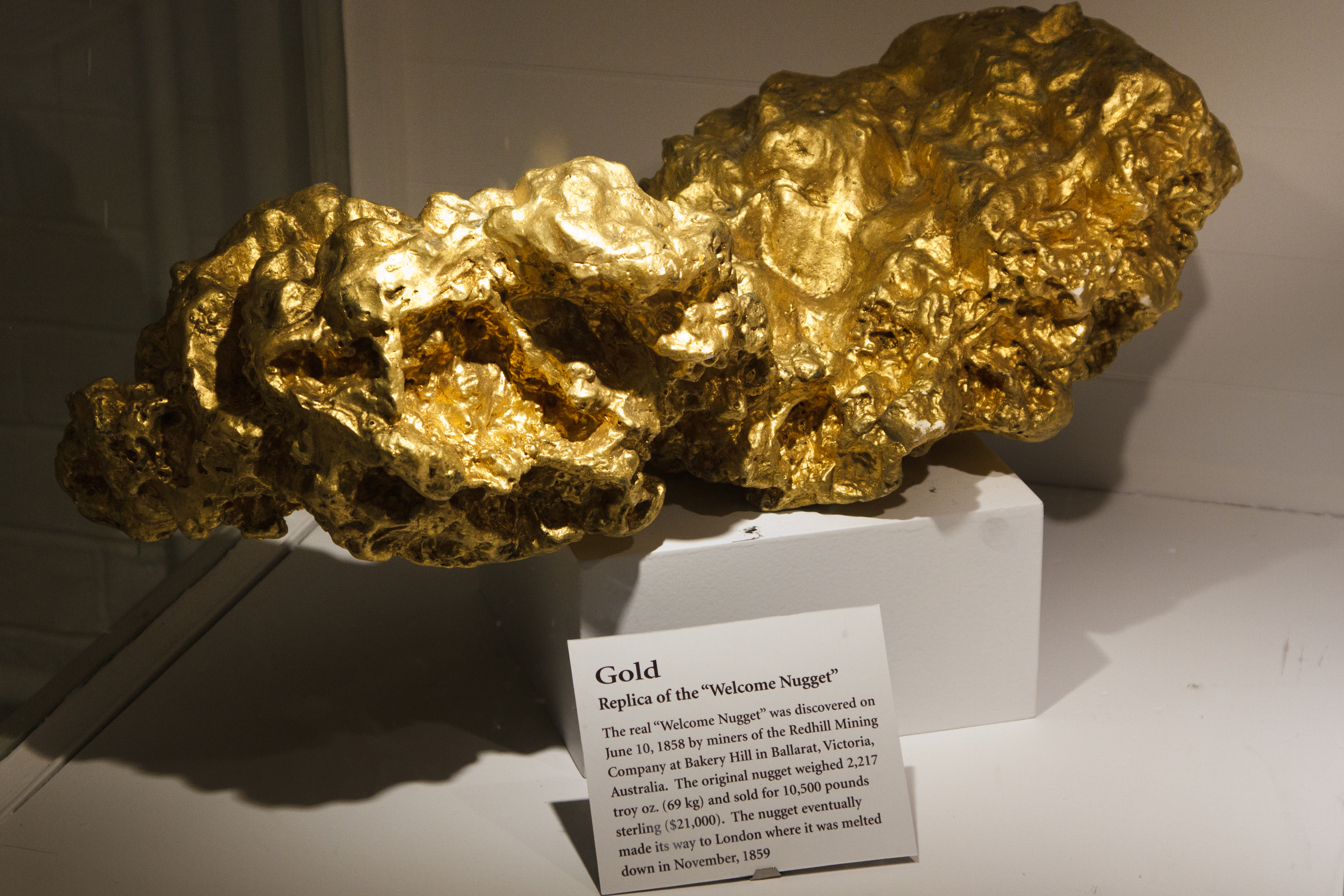
Replica of the "Welcome Nugget", found at Ballarat, the second-largest gold nugget discovered in recorded history

Though historically an important sector, the production of Ballarat's primary sector declined for many decades, recovering only marginally since 2006. Where historically the mining industry supported tens of thousands of workers or the majority of the population, today agriculture dominates the sector, though collectively both industries employ less than thousand people or just over 2% of the City of Ballarat's total workforce.

Ballarat rose to prominence as a goldrush boomtown, though gold no longer plays a pivotal role in the economy of the city. Nevertheless, deep underground mining continues to the present date with a single main mine operating. There are still thought to be large, undiscovered gold reserves in the Ballarat region, with investigations being made by local and national companies. Lihir Gold invested in Ballarat Goldfields in 2006, but it downscaled its operations in 2009 due to the expense of extraction before selling its stake in 2010 to Castlemaine Goldfields. Along with gold, lignite (coal), kaolin (clay) and iron ore have also been mined in the Ballarat region and nearby Lal Lal, but many of the resource deposits have since been exhausted. An active quarrying industry with large enterprises including Boral Limited extracts and manufactures building materials from the Ballarat region, including clays, aggregates, cements, asphalts.

Approximately half (38,000 hectares or 94,000 acres) of the municipality's area is rural with optimal conditions for agriculture including rich volcanic soils and climate. This area is used primarily for agriculture and animal husbandry and generates more than $37 million in commodities. The region supports an active potato growing industry that has supplied local food manufacturers including McCain, though more recently has been threatened by cheaper imports. Other large crops include grains, vegetables, grapes and berries. Cattle and poultry stocks, including sheep, cows and pigs, support an active local meat and dairy industry. The Ballarat Livestock Selling Centre is the largest cattle exchange in regional Victoria. The Ballarat Agricultural and Pastoral Society formed in 1856 and has run the Ballarat Show annually since 1859.

A$7.5 million forestry industry is active in nearby state forests as well as on a small scale in the urban area along the Canadian Valley around the suburbs of Mt Clear and Mt Helen areas with pine plantations and sawmill operations.

==== Renewable energy ====
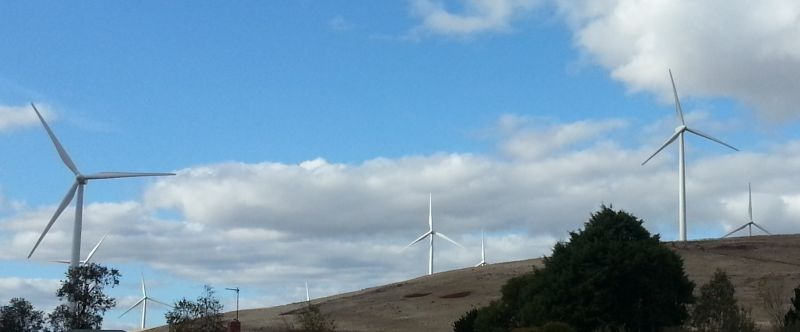
Waubra Wind Farm

The Ballarat region has a rapidly growing renewable energy industry, in particular due to its abundant wind energy, attracting significant investment and generating revenue for local landholders and local councils. Ballarat is predicted to be Victoria's largest energy supplier by 2040, powering millions of homes through renewable energy due primarily to its booming wind farming industry. The region is also a source of bountiful geothermal energy, solar power and biomass although to date, only its wind, solar and hydroelectricity has been harvested commercially. All local commercially produced electricity is sent to the National Electricity Market. Ballarat is home to BESS, the first large-scale, grid-connected battery in Australia. Completed in 2018 it was built to store renewable energy to help meet critical peak demand.

There are more than half a dozen wind farms in the region with many larger farms planned. Waubra Wind Farm 35 km north west, completed in 2009, is capable of producing enough electricity to power a city three to four times the size of Ballarat. Other significant nearby wind farms include Mount Mercer 20 km south, completed 2014, which produces enough energy to power 100,000 homes, equivalent to Ballarat's population. The first community-owned wind farm in Australia, the Hepburn Wind Project at Leonards Hill 35 km north east, completed in 2011, produces the equivalent amount of electricity used by the town of Daylesford. Lal Lal Wind Farm 20 km to the east was completed in 2019 has 64 turbines. Stockyard Hill Wind Farm 35 km to the west completed in 2022 and has 157 turbines.

Hydroelectricity is generated at White Swan reservoir micro hydro plant established in 2008 and producing the equivalent electricity needs of around 370 homes. Ballarat Solar Park, opened in 2009 at the Airport site in Mitchell Park, is Victoria's first ground-mounted, flat-plate and grid-connected photovoltaic farm. Built by Sharp Corporation for Origin Energy, it is 14,993 m^{2} (161,380 sq ft) and generates the equivalent electricity needs of around 150 homes.

== Demographics ==
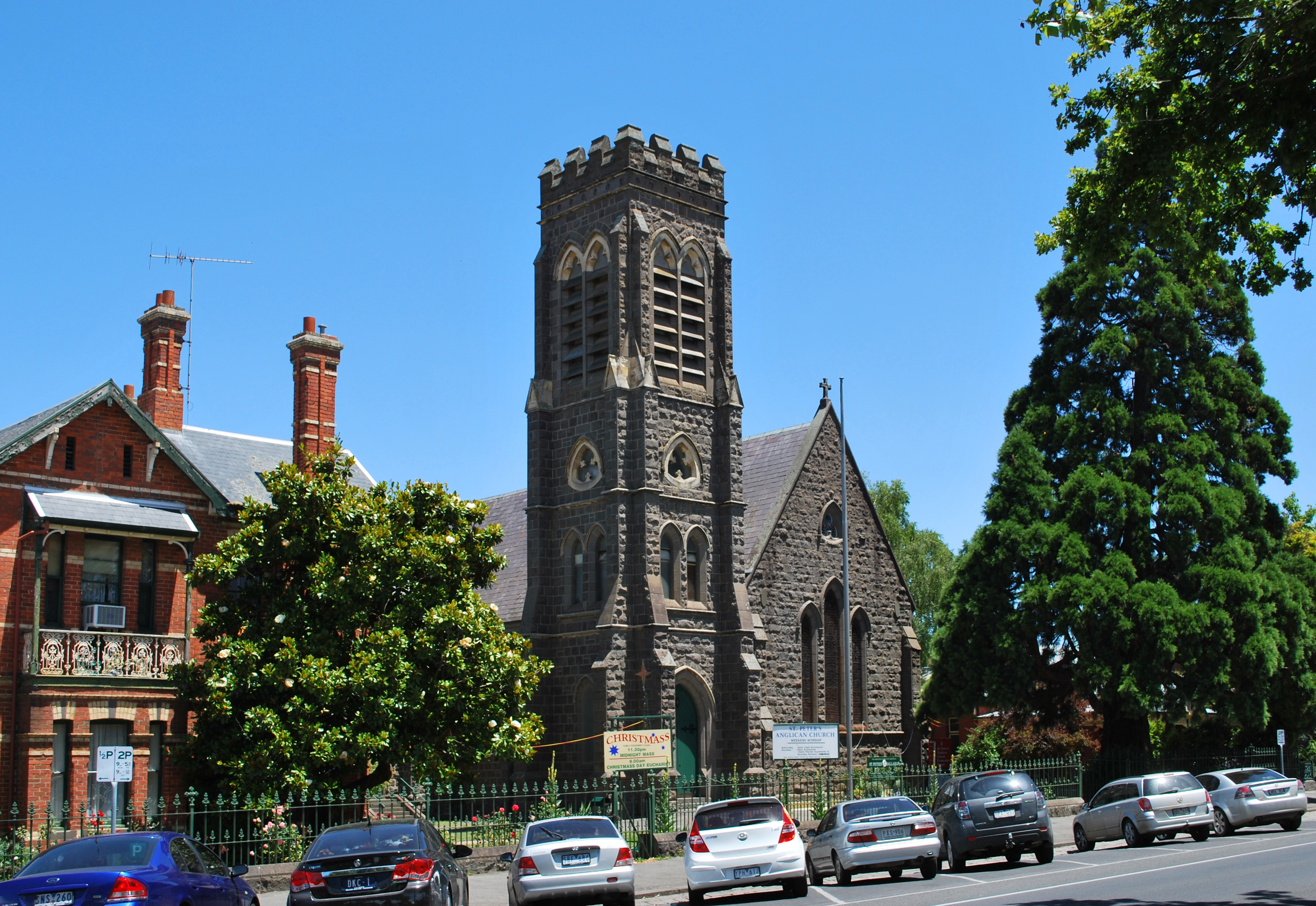
St Peter's Anglican Church, which represents the second most common religious affiliation in Ballarat

Ballarat is the 3rd largest inland city in Australia, and the 3rd largest Victorian city behind Melbourne and Geelong. According to the 2021 census, there were 116,201 people in Ballarat, a moderate increase from 105,471 in June 2018. This follows annual growth of 1.78% since June 2013 (slightly faster than the national rate of 1.56% during the same period).

The recently accelerated growth rate has been attributed by demographers to increased commuter activity arising from surging house and land prices in Melbourne coupled with public transport improvements between Ballarat and Melbourne.

Most of the city's population can trace their ancestry to Anglo-Celtic descent, and 16.3% of the population are born overseas. These include people from England (2.1%), India (1.6%), New Zealand (0.9%), China (0.6%), and the Philippines (0.6%). 8.2% speak a language other than English. 18.8% of the population is over the age of 65. The median age in Ballarat is 38 years.

Ballarat's ethnic make up is partly the result of the mid 19th Century gold rush, where people of Celtic, Anglo-Saxon and East Asian descent emigrated here in the hope of landing a fortune.

The median income of the local government area of Ballarat in 2019-2010 was $A50,767. According to the 2021 Census, Ballarat's working population include Professionals (22.8%), Community and Personal Service Workers (13.8%), Technicians and Trades Workers (13.8%), Clerical and Administrative Workers (12.3%), and Managers (11.2%). The unemployment rate in 2021 was 4.8%.

21.9% of the population have completed further education after high school.

According to the 2017 Victorian Population Health Survey, Ballarat is home to the fifth largest community of LGBTIQA+ people by LGA in the State.

=== Religion ===
Christianity is the most common religion in Ballarat. Catholics (21.3%), Anglicans (7.9%) and the Uniting Church (4.7%) were the largest Christian denominations. 47.6% stated they had no religion and a further 5.9% did not answer the question.

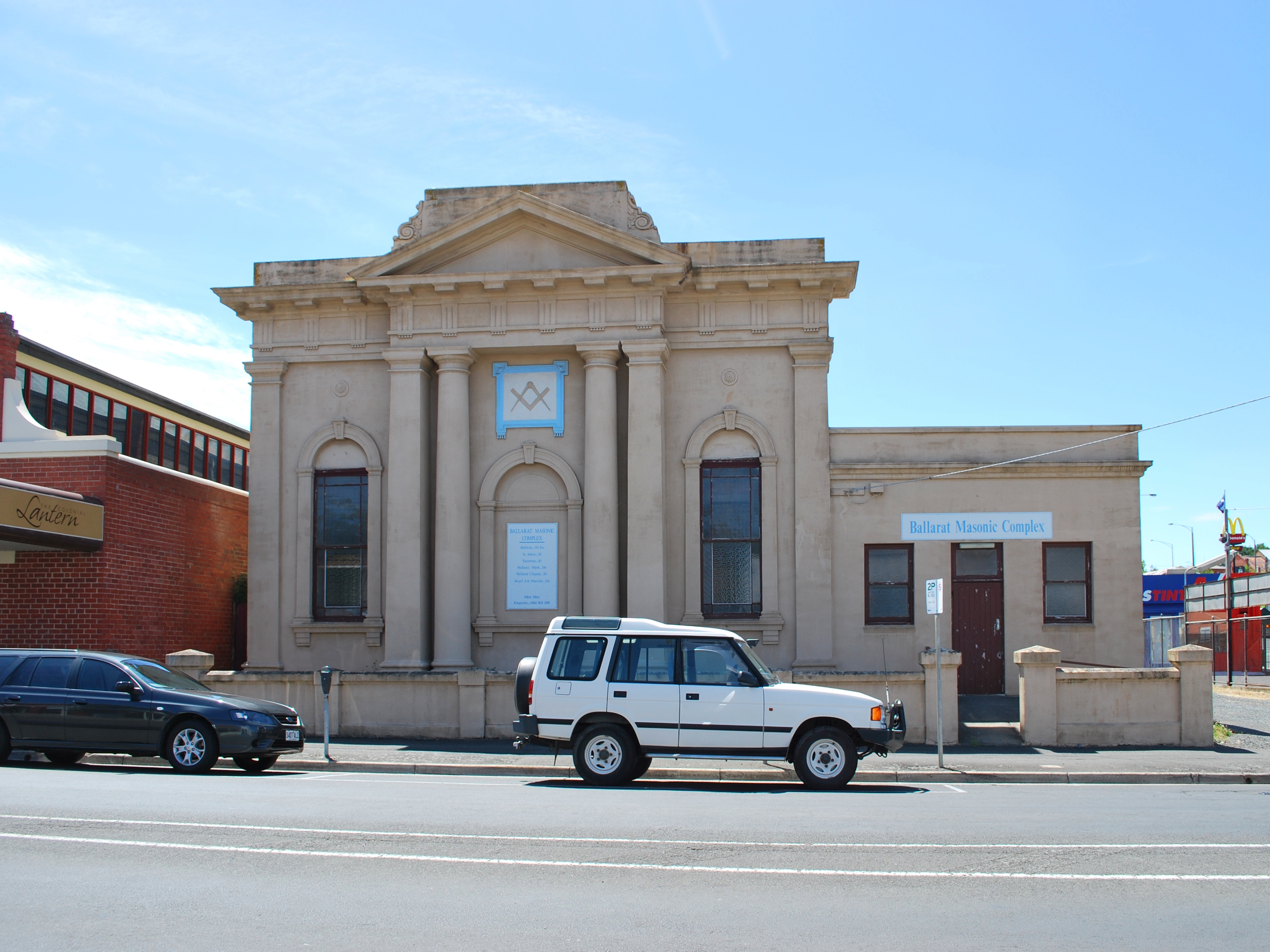
Ballarat Masonic Complex

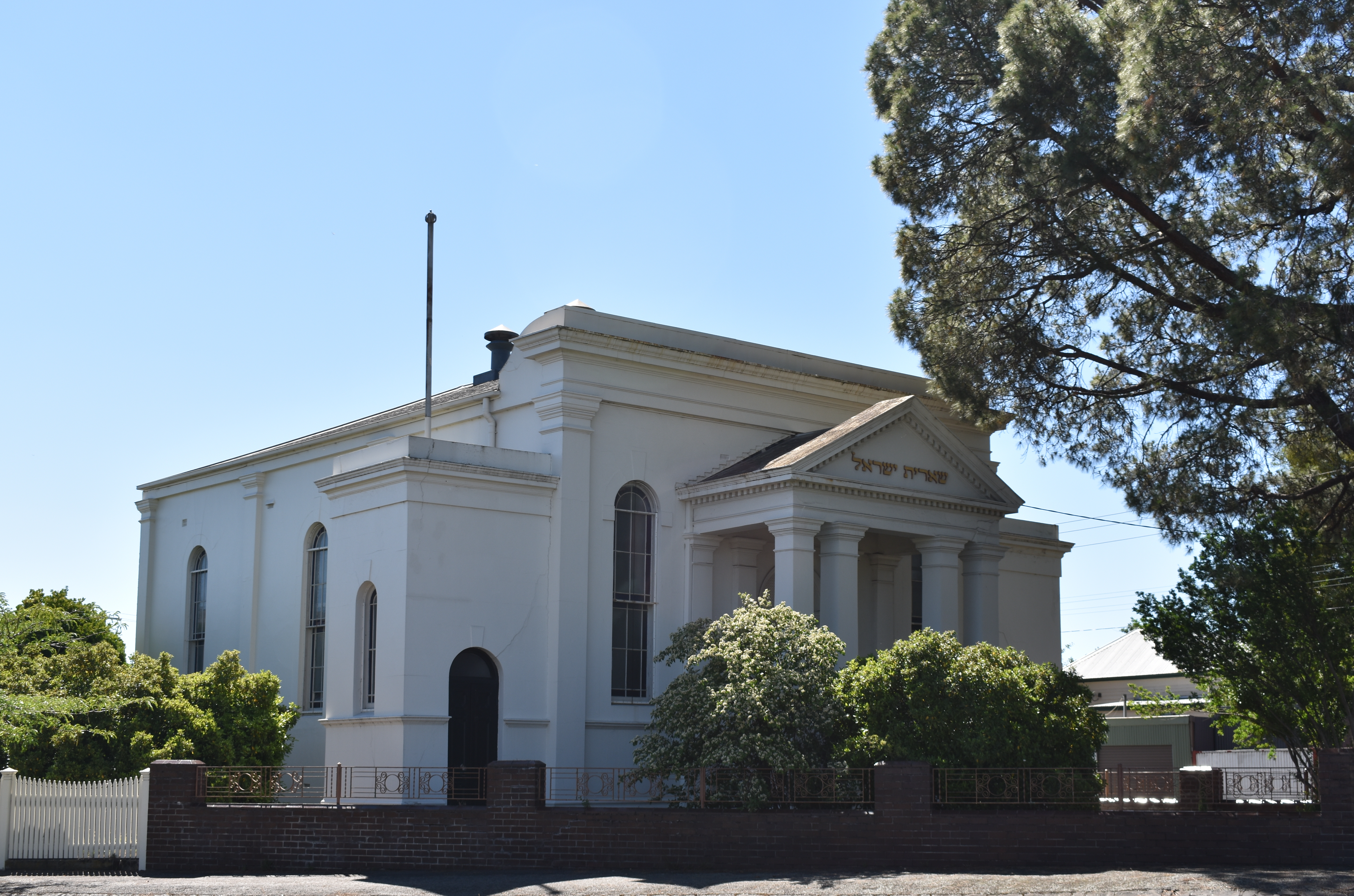
Ballarat Synagogue

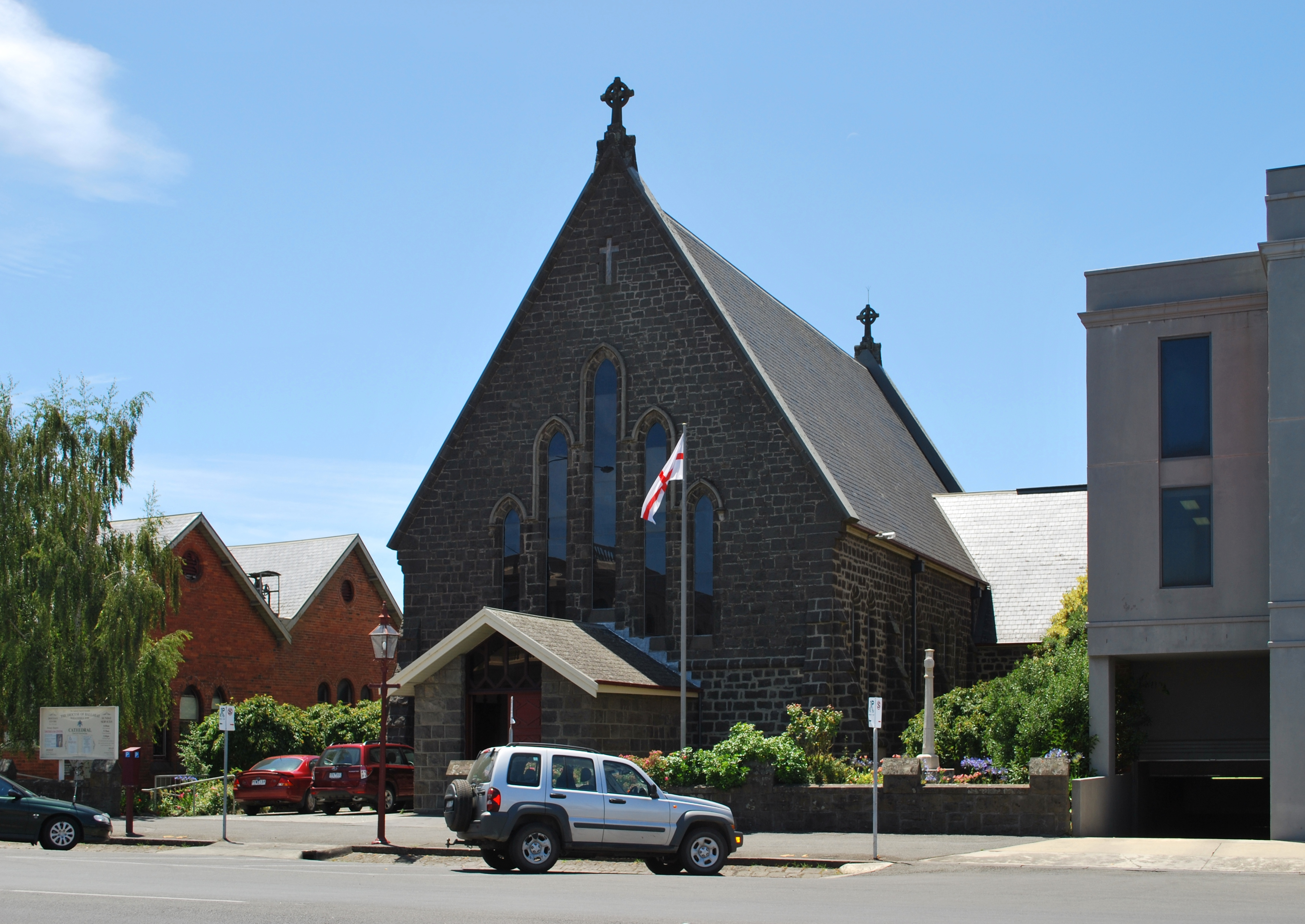
Christ the King Anglican cathedral

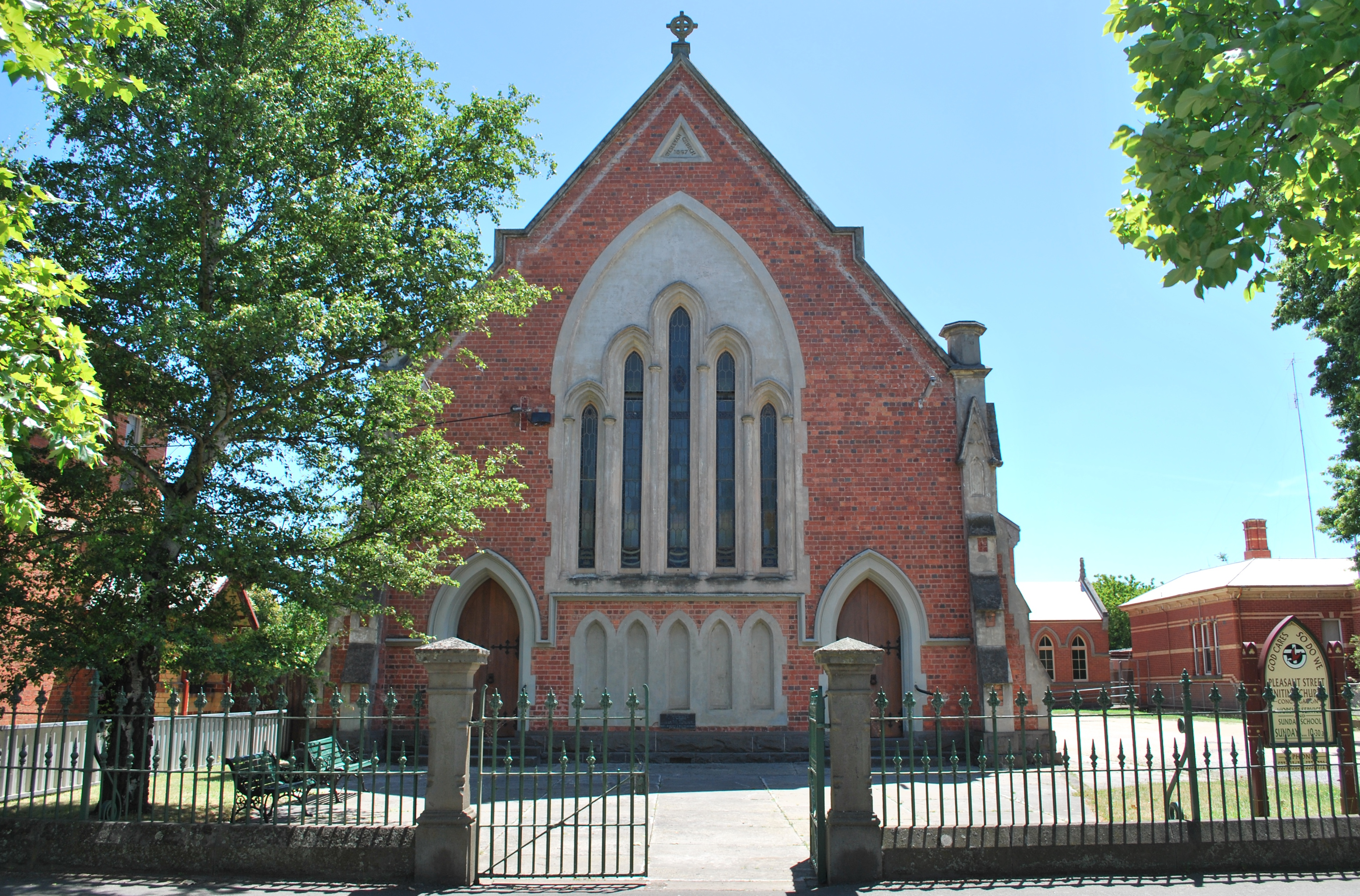
Pleasant St Uniting Church

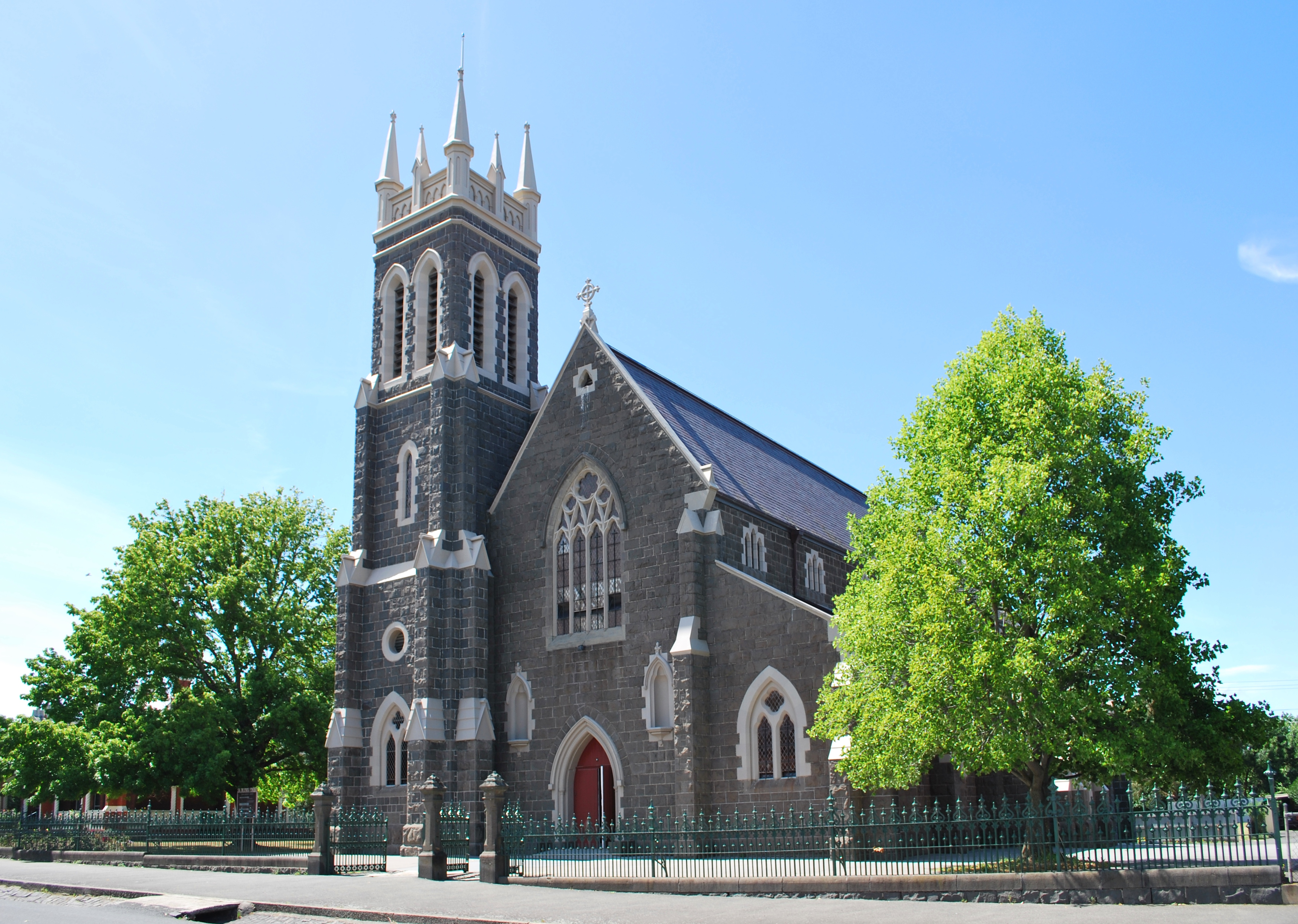
St Alipius Roman Catholic church

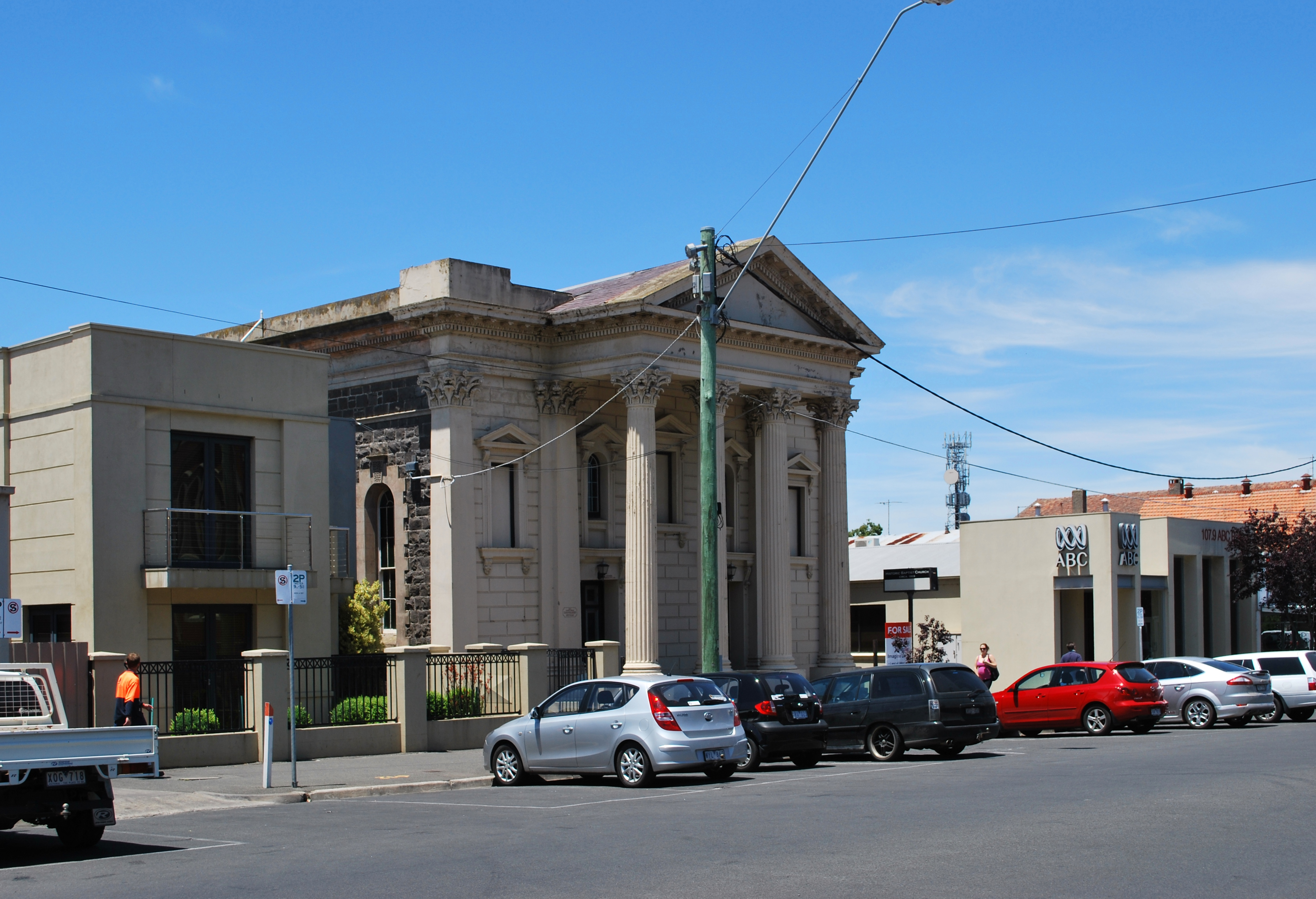
Baptist Church

== Governance ==
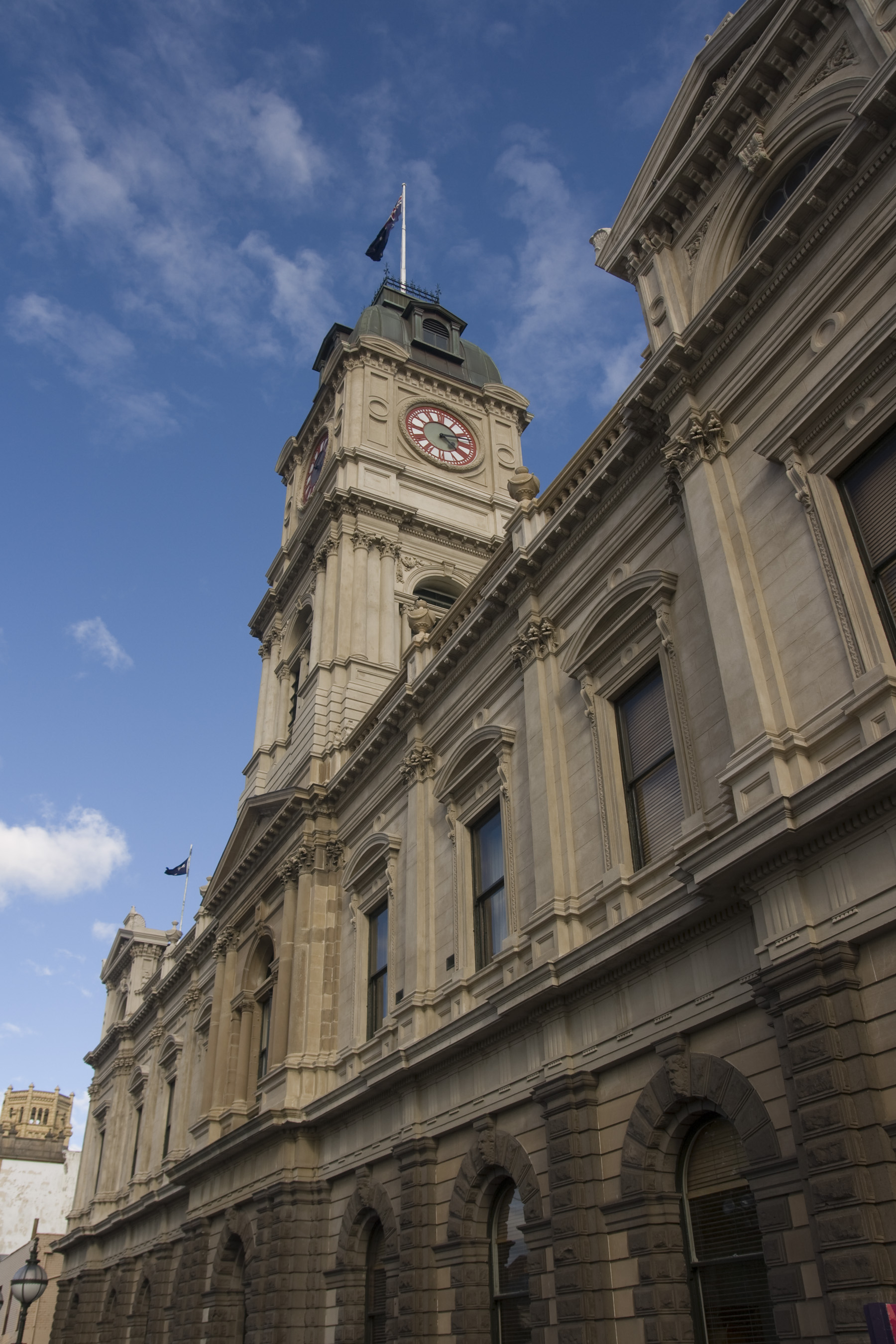
Ballarat Town Hall

Council Chamber in Ballarat Town Hall, Sturt Street, is the seat of local government for the City of Ballarat. The council was created in 1994 as an amalgamation of a number of other municipalities in the region. The city is made up of three wards, each represented by three councillors elected once every four years by postal voting. The mayor of Ballarat, currently Tracey Hargreaves, is elected from these councillors by their colleagues for a one-year term. The Town Hall and annexe contains some council offices, but the council's administrative headquarters are located at the council owned Phoenix Building and the leased Gordon Buildings on the opposite side of Bath Lane.

In state politics, Ballarat is located in the Legislative Assembly districts of Eureka and Wendouree, with both of these seats currently held by the Australian Labor Party. In federal politics, Ballarat is located in a single House of Representatives division—the Division of Ballarat. The Division of Ballarat has been a safe Australian Labor Party seat since 2001, and was the seat of the second Prime Minister of Australia, Alfred Deakin.

Law enforcement is overseen from regional police headquarters at the law complex in Dana Street with a single local police station operating in Buninyong. Due to an increase in crime rates and population, two additional local police stations were proposed in 2011 one each for the suburbs of North Ballarat and Sebastopol. Justice is conducted locally overseen through branches of the Supreme, County, Magistrates and Children's Court of Victoria which operate out of the Ballarat courts Complex adjacent police headquarters in Dana Street. Corrections, at least in the longer term are no longer handled locally since the closure of the Ballarat Gaol in 1965. Offenders can be detained in 25 available cells at the police complex though are commonly transferred to nearby Corrections Victoria facilities such as the Hopkins Correctional Centre in Ararat.

Public safety and emergency services are provided by several state funded organisations including local volunteer based organisations. Storms and flooding are handled by the State Emergency Service (SES) Mid West Region Headquarters at Wendouree. Bushfires are handled by the Country Fire Authority District 15 Headquarters and Grampians Region Headquarters at Wendouree and urban structure fires are handled by multiple urban fire brigades operating at fire stations including the Ballarat Fire Brigade at Barkly Street Ballarat East, Ballarat City Fire Brigade at Sturt Street Ballarat Central and suburban stations including Wendouree and Sebastopol. Medical emergency and paramedic services are provided through Ambulance Victoria and include the Rural Ambulance Victoria, St. John Ambulance and Ballarat Base Hospital ambulance services. City of Ballarat is responsible for coordinating the Municipal Emergency Management Planning Committee (MEMPC) which prepares the Municipal Emergency Management Plan which is actioned in conjunction with local police.

== Media ==
=== Newspapers ===
Ballarat has two local newspapers, one owned by Australian Community Media and one a private equity. The Courier is a daily and The Ballarat Times News Group is a free weekly. The latter is distributed across most of the city on Thursday and contains news of community events, advertisements for local businesses, and a classifieds section. Ballarat was the hub of Australian Community Media's Victoria production and manufacturing with all printed material for the state coming from the Wendouree print site until it closed in September 2020.

=== Radio stations ===
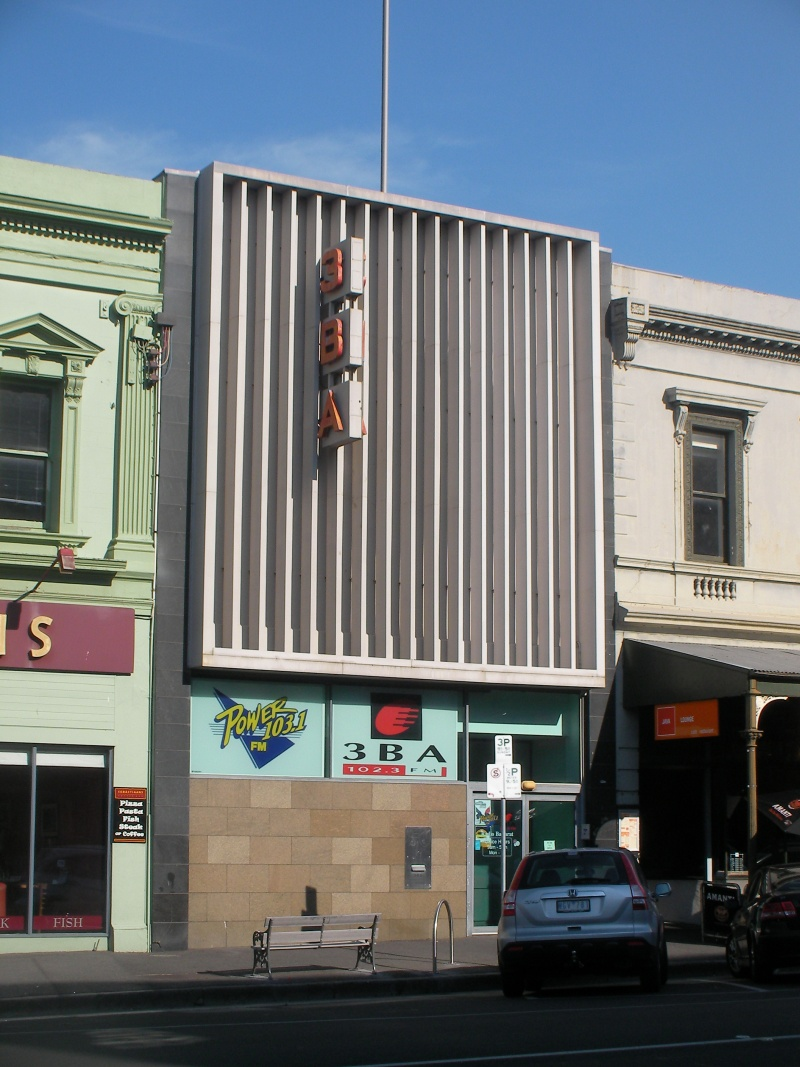
Radio House, Lydiard Street North, home to 3BA and Power FM

Local radio stations include 3BA, Power FM and several community radio stations. There is also a Ballarat branch of ABC Local Radio's national network.

- 102.3 FM – 3BA (local "classic hits" commercial radio station)
- 103.1 FM – Power FM 103.1 FM (local "top-40" commercial radio station)
- 99.9 FM – Voice FM 99.9 – formerly known as 3BBB (local community radio station)
- 107.9 FM – ABC Ballarat (government-funded local news, current affairs, light entertainment and talkback)
- 103.9 FM – Good News Radio 103.9 (Christian community-based radio station)

=== Television ===
Television station BTV Channel 6 Ballarat commenced transmission of test patterns on 17 March 1962. Today Ballarat is serviced by numerous "free to air" High Definition and Standard Definition Digital television services. Two television broadcasting stations are located in the city, including WIN, WIN HD, 9Life, 9Go! and 9Gem (sub-licensees of the Nine Network) and Seven, 7HD, 7two, 7mate, 7Bravo and 7flix (Seven Network owned and operated). These two stations broadcast relayed services throughout regional Victoria. The city also receives 10, 10 HD, 10 Comedy, 10 Drama, Nickelodeon and News24 Regional (Network 10 owned and operated) which is based in Bendigo but operates a local office.

Ballarat television maintains a similar schedule to the national television network but maintains local commercials and regional news programming.

- WIN previously presented a 30-minute local WIN News bulletin from its studios in the city, where WIN News bulletins for Albury, Bendigo, Gippsland, Shepparton and Mildura were also broadcast. In 2015, the Ballarat studios closed with production of the regional Victorian news bulletins being relocated to Wollongong in New South Wales, where they now originate from. WIN retains reporters and camera crews for its Ballarat bulletin in the city.
- Network 10 airs short local news updates like Seven throughout the day, broadcast from its Hobart studios.
- Seven airs short local news and weather updates throughout the day, broadcast from its Canberra studios with an office in the city.

In addition to commercial television services, Ballarat receives Government funded ABC (ABC TV, ABC Family, ABC Kids, ABC Entertains, ABC News) and SBS (SBS TV, SBS2, SBS World Movies, SBS WorldWatch, SBS Food and NITV) television services.

On 5 May 2011, analog television transmissions ceased in most areas of regional Victoria and some border regions including Ballarat and surrounding areas. All local free-to-air television services are now broadcasting in digital transmission only. This was done as part of the federal government's plan for digital terrestrial television in Australia, where all analogue transmission systems are gradually turned off and replaced with modern DVB-T transmission systems.

Subscription television services are provided by Neighbourhood Cable, Foxtel and SelecTV.

== Education ==
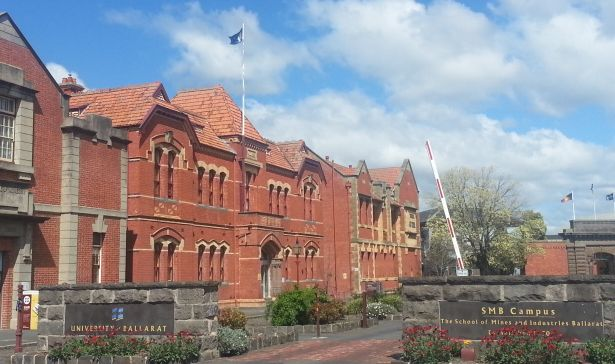
Federation University Australia's SMB campus is set among heritage buildings, including the former School of Mines and Industry (left).

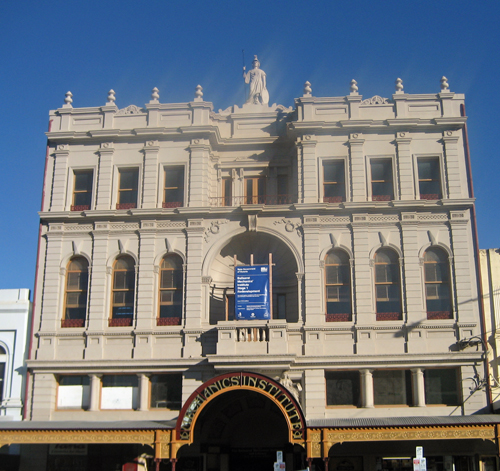
Ballarat Mechanics' Institute

Ballarat has two universities, Federation University and a campus of the Australian Catholic University.

Formerly the University of Ballarat, Federation University Australia was opened in 2014. It originated as the Ballarat School of Mines, founded in 1870, and was once affiliated with the University of Melbourne. The main campus is located in Mount Helen, approximately 6 kilometres (3.7 miles) southeast of the city. The university also has campuses in the Ballarat CBD, Horsham, Berwick, Brisbane, Churchill, Ararat and Stawell.

The Australian Catholic University's Ballarat campus is located on Mair Street. It was formerly the Aquinas Training College, run by the Ballarat East Sisters of Mercy in 1909. It is ACU's only campus located outside of a capital city.

Ballarat has five state government-operated secondary schools, of which Ballarat High School (established in 1907) is the oldest. Ballarat High School and Mount Clear College are the only state school members of the Ballarat Associated Schools. The three remaining schools are Phoenix College and the two newly formed schools Mount Rowan Secondary College and Woodmans Hill Secondary College which emerged from the old Ballarat Secondary College. Phoenix College was formed in 2012 as an amalgamation of Sebastopol College and Redan Primary School.

The city is well serviced by Catholic schools, with eight primary schools and three secondary colleges which include the all-boys St Patrick's College, the all-girls Loreto College and the co-educational Damascus College, which was formed by the amalgamation of St Martin's in the Pines, St Paul's College and Sacred Heart College in 1995.

Ballarat has three other non-government secondary schools: Ballarat Christian College, Ballarat Clarendon College and Ballarat Grammar School. The later two schools are day and boarding schools who provide education from Preschool to Year 12. Both of these co-educational schools are classified as academically excellent as the only Ballarat schools to be ranked on the tables of the top 100 Victorian schools based on median VCE scores and percentage of scores of 40 and above. In 2015, Clarendon was placed at 9th best VCE results in the State, above Melbourne Grammar, Geelong College, Scotch College, Trinity Grammar School (Victoria), Xavier College, and Haileybury College. Ballarat Grammar was placed at 82nd, above Wesley College, Geelong Grammar and Tintern.

The City of Ballarat has three public libraries, the largest and most extensive of which is the Ballarat Library, run by the City of Ballarat and located on Doveton Street North. Another library service is provided by the Ballarat Mechanics' Institute in Sturt Street, which is the oldest library in the city and a significant heritage site; it contains a collection of historic, archival and rare reference material as well as more general books.

The Xin Jin Shan Chinese Library opened in 2022. It contains over 240,000 Chinese-language books, reportedly the largest collection in the Southern Hemisphere.

== Arts and culture ==
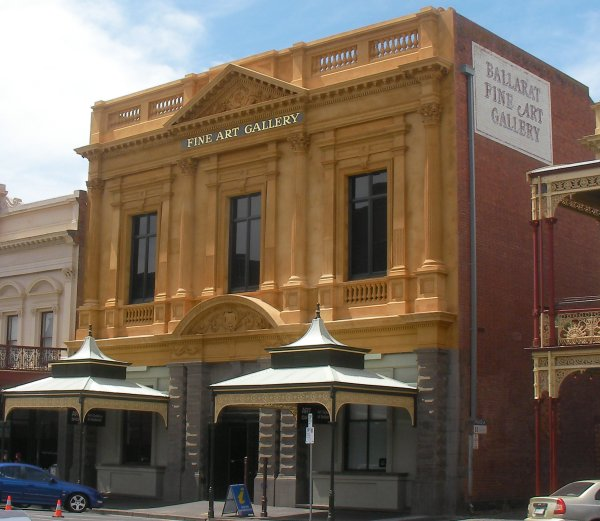
Ballarat Fine Art Gallery, the oldest and largest art gallery in regional Australia

=== Galleries ===
The Art Gallery of Ballarat houses one of Australia's oldest and most extensive collections of early Australian works. It is the oldest and largest regional gallery in Australia.

Federation University Australia operates the Post Office Gallery in the Wardell-designed former Post Office on the corner of Sturt and Lydiard Streets.

=== Performing arts ===
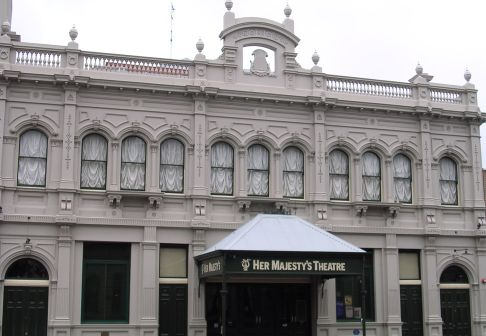
Her Majesty's Theatre, built in 1875

Ballarat has a lively and well-established theatrical community, with several local ensembles as well as a number of large performing arts venues. Major performing arts venues include the 800-capacity Her Majesty's Theatre, the 857 seat Wendouree Centre for Performing Arts and the Loreto Abbey Theatre in the Mary's Mount Centre which is part of Loreto College a Roman Catholic girls school with 500 seats. Ballarat also hosts the smaller 90 seat Post Office Box Theatre which is also used by Federation University's Performing Arts Academy program.

Notable theatre organisations in Ballarat include Ballarat National Theatre (since 1938); BLOC (Ballarat Light Opera Company; since 1959); the amateur theatre troupe Creswick Theatre Company (since 1981); and the female-led boutique company, Salty Theatre (established 2018).

The Ballarat Civic Hall is a large public building constructed in 1956 as a general purpose venue. Its stripped classical design was heavily criticised during its planning, but it has gained some cultural significance to the city with its cavernous spaces holding many significant events over the years. Civic Hall was closed in 2002 and public pressure forced the council to redevelop it in 2018 as a modern performing arts and exposition centre. The refurbished building is a modern interpretation of its original 1950s built form and features a 1000 capacity main hall capable of use for concerts, meetings and civic events.

The Regent Cinemas, which opened in the heart of the city in 1928, was once the largest picture palace in regional Victoria, with nearly 2,000 seats in stalls and balcony. It was designed by noted Melbourne theatre architect Cedric Heise Ballantyne, and who was also responsible designing the Regent Theatre on Collins Street, Melbourne. After the interiors were damaged by fire in 1943 (although the front facade survived), the architectural firm Cowper, Murphy & Appleford redesigned the building. Hoyts ran the cinema from its inception until it closed the venue in 1964 or 1970. It was acquired and renovated by the Anderson family, who reopened it in 1976. It was completely refurbished and the interiors redesigned to create a multiplex containing three separate theatres in 1986, and a further three screens were added in the early 2000s. The facade remained intact, and the sign at its entrance showed the words "The Regent Multiplex", while the vertical sign simply said "Regent". On 24 June 2024, the owners announced the closure of the cinema, effective immediately, to the dismay of many patrons and the mayor of Ballarat.

Ballarat has its own symphony orchestra, the Ballarat Symphony Orchestra, which was formed in 1987.

The city has several dance clubs as well as a highly active live music and jazz scene.

=== Events and festivals ===
Ballarat is home to many annual festivals and events that attract thousands of visitors. The oldest large annual event is the Ballarat Agricultural Show (since 1859), currently held at the Ballarat Showgrounds and has attracted attendances of up to 30,000 and is an official public holiday for residents of the city.

Ballarat is home to Australia's oldest and largest annual performing arts eisteddfod. The Royal South Street Eisteddfod is an all-encompassing performing arts festival and competition event that is conducted over twelve weeks annually.

From the late 1880s, annual musical performance competitions were run by the South Street Society, which became the Royal South Street Eisteddfod.

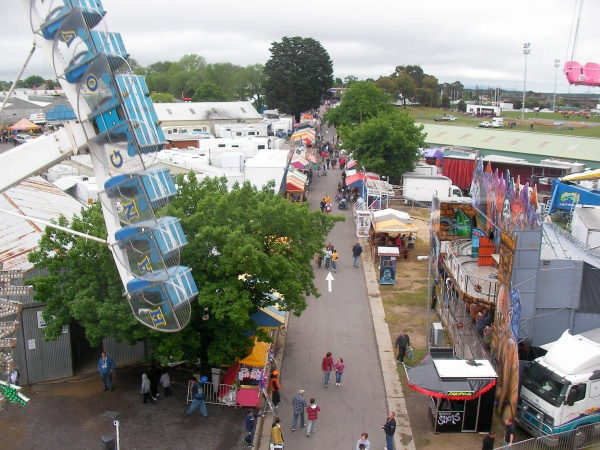
Annual Agricultural Society Show at Ballarat Showgrounds, Wendouree

Lake Wendouree is featured in many including the biggest and most prominent is the Begonia Festival (held annually since 1953). SpringFest (held annually since 2001) attracts more than 15,000 people from around Victoria and features market stalls and activities around the lake.

The Ballarat Swap Meet (formerly the Super Southern Swap Meet and held annually since 1989) attracts 30,000 visitors a year. Ballarat Heritage Weekend (held annually since 2006) celebrates the city's heritage with activities such as historic vehicles and displays in and around the CBD and has attracted as many as 14,500 visitors a year from around Victoria. The Ballarat Beer Festival at the City Oval (since 2012) has attracted more than 4,000 visitors. The Ballarat Airport Open Day (Ballarat's unofficial air show, held annually since 2009) also attracts thousands.

Other minor cultural festivals include the Ballarat Writers Festival, Ballarat International Foto Biennale and the Goldfields Music Festival.

=== Other entertainment ===
In the 1970s the Ballarat urban area contained around 60 hotels. The introduction of gaming machines in the early 1990s brought about significant change in the city's entertainment precincts. By 2006 at least 20 hotels had closed and some of the remaining ones had been redeveloped as dining and/or gaming venues. Gaming machines brought significant revenue to the remaining hotels, sports and social clubs, enabling expansion and modernisation. The city has many restaurants and wine bars.

== Cultural depictions ==
Ballarat has inspired many visual artists. Eugene von Guerard documented the city's establishment as a gold digging settlement, while Albert Henry Fullwood and Knut Bull depicted the city's boom era streetscapes. Ballarat features prominently in literature and fiction, including "The Boscombe Valley Mystery", a short story from Arthur Conan Doyle's The Adventures of Sherlock Holmes (1891); King Billy of Ballarat and Other Stories (1892) by Morley Roberts; The Fortunes of Richard Mahony (1917) by Henry Handel Richardson; Murder on the Ballarat Train (1993) by Kerry Greenwood; and Illywhacker (1985) by Peter Carey.

Ballarat is also a popular filming location. Australia's second oldest feature film, Eureka Stockade (1907), is the first in a line of films about the historic Ballarat event. The city makes cameos in Dogs in Space (1986), My Brother Jack (2001), Ned Kelly (2003) and The Writer (2005). The television series The Doctor Blake Mysteries (2012–2017) is set in Ballarat and was mostly shot there. The series was picked by the Seven Network, which proposes to make several telemovies without the Blake character, picking up the story line after his death, leaving his widow Jean.

Two ships of the Royal Australian Navy have been named HMAS Ballarat after the city, the corvette HMAS Ballarat (J184) and the frigate HMAS Ballarat (FFH 155).

== Sport and recreation ==
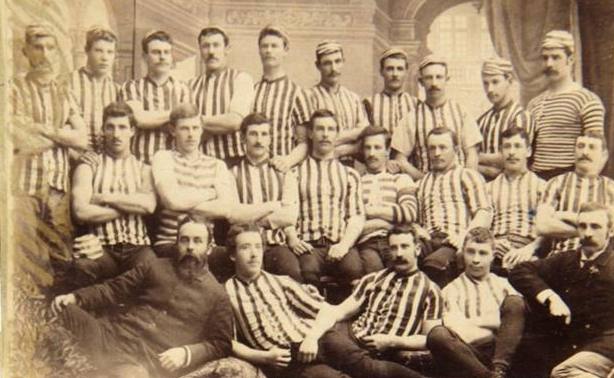
Ballarat Football Club, 1889. The club was founded in 1860 and is one of the oldest football clubs in the world.

Australian rules football has a long history in Ballarat and is the city's most popular spectator and participation sport. It has its own dedicated stadium, Eureka Stadium. The Western Bulldogs have had a partnership with the city since 2014 and currently play home games there each year: 3 Australian Football League (AFL) and 1 AFL Women's. It is also the home ground of the semi-professional North Ballarat Roosters, which formerly competed in the Victorian Football League (VFL). The Ballarat Football League, established in 1893, features six local teams, including the Ballarat Football Club, which was founded in 1860 and remains one of the world's oldest football clubs. Other Ballarat-based teams compete in the regional Central Highlands Football League.

Cricket is Ballarat's second most-popular sport. It has three international standard cricket ovals, including Eastern Oval, which was one of the host venues of the 1992 Cricket World Cup. The Ballarat Cricket Association is the city's principle cricket competition.

Soccer is based at Morshead Park Stadium, the semi-professional Ballarat City FC competes in the National Premier League, the third tier competition of Australian soccer. Melbourne's Western United FC plays four A-League matches per year at Eureka Stadium.

Basketball is played in Ballarat with the Ballarat Sports Events Centre hosting South East Australian Basketball League matches involving the Ballarat Miners and Ballarat Rush. There is also a local league. Netball is similarly popular, with many netball clubs affiliated with local Australian rules clubs.

Athletics is and has historically been very popular with four local clubs competing at the BRAC (Ballarat Regional Athletics Centre) located at the Llanberis Athletics Track in Golden Point, five minutes from the CBD. Several Olympians, including Steve Moneghetti and Paralympian Greg Smith, and other athletes, such as racewalker Jared Tallent, were born in Ballarat.

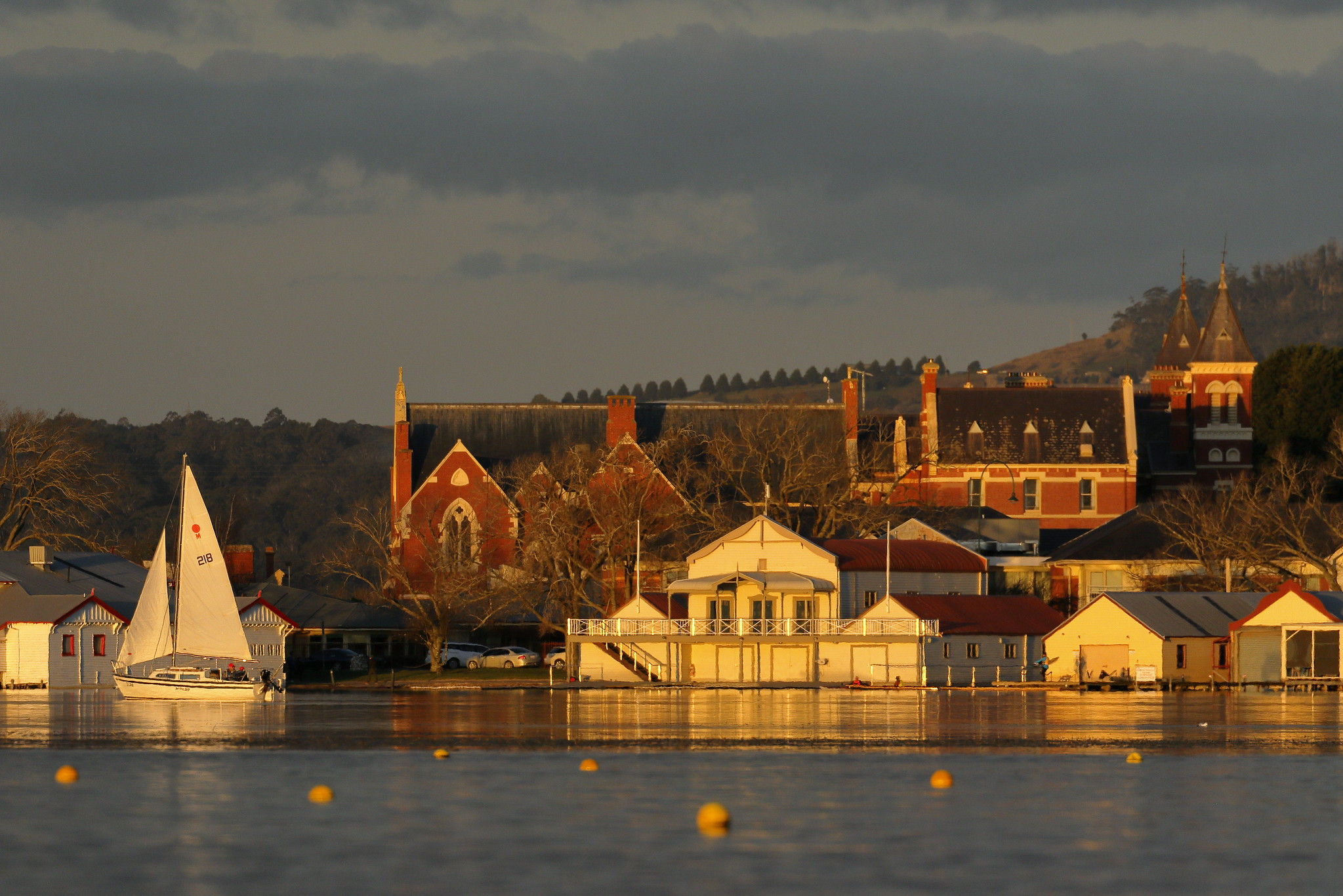
Lake Wendouree hosted the rowing and canoeing events for the 1956 Summer Olympics.

Rowing and kayaking are centred on Lake Wendouree, which hosts the Victorian Schools Rowing Championships as well as the annual "Head of the Lake" rowing regatta. The city hosted rowing events for the 1956 Summer Olympic Games. Horse racing and greyhound racing are also popular, with dedicated facilities. The Ballarat Turf Club schedules around 28 race meetings a year including the Ballarat Cup meeting in mid-November. Athletics facilities include an international standard athletics track at Golden Point. Swimming and water sport is facilitated at two Olympic-sized pools as well as an indoor 25-metre (82-foot) competition short course pool. The main facility is the Ballarat Aquatic Centre located in Lake Gardens. Baseball was first organised in Australia at Ballarat in 1857, and three local teams compete in the Geelong Baseball Association.

Golf is played at four main venues, including the Ballarat Golf Course in Alfredton, home to the Ballarat Golf Club. The Ballarat Roller Derby League was formed in 2008, and held their first match in 2009. They have two teams who compete in local events, and a combined travelling team, the Rat Pack, who compete in interleague roller derby competitions.

The World Athletics-Certified Ballarat Marathon Road Running Festival, inaugurated in 2024, is now an annual event. It features a variety of road running events, including a full marathon, half marathon, 10 km run, and family-friendly fun runs, attracting participants from across the region and beyond. The 2024 Marathon Event was a qualifying race for the Abbott World Marathon Majors 2025 Age Group Championships. The festival promotes community participation, and showcases Ballarat's scenic landmarks.

Until they were cancelled in July 2023, Ballarat, along with other cities in regional Victoria, was scheduled to host the 2026 Commonwealth Games with Eureka Stadium flagged to host athletics, the Eastern Oval T20 cricket, and Selkirk Stadium to host boxing.

Ballarat Highlanders Rugby Football Club (est. 1976) is based at Doug Dean Reserve, Delecombe. They play in the statewide Victoria Rugby Championship, which they last won in 2016. They also host the Ballarat Charity 7s (est 2022), a short form version of rugby union.

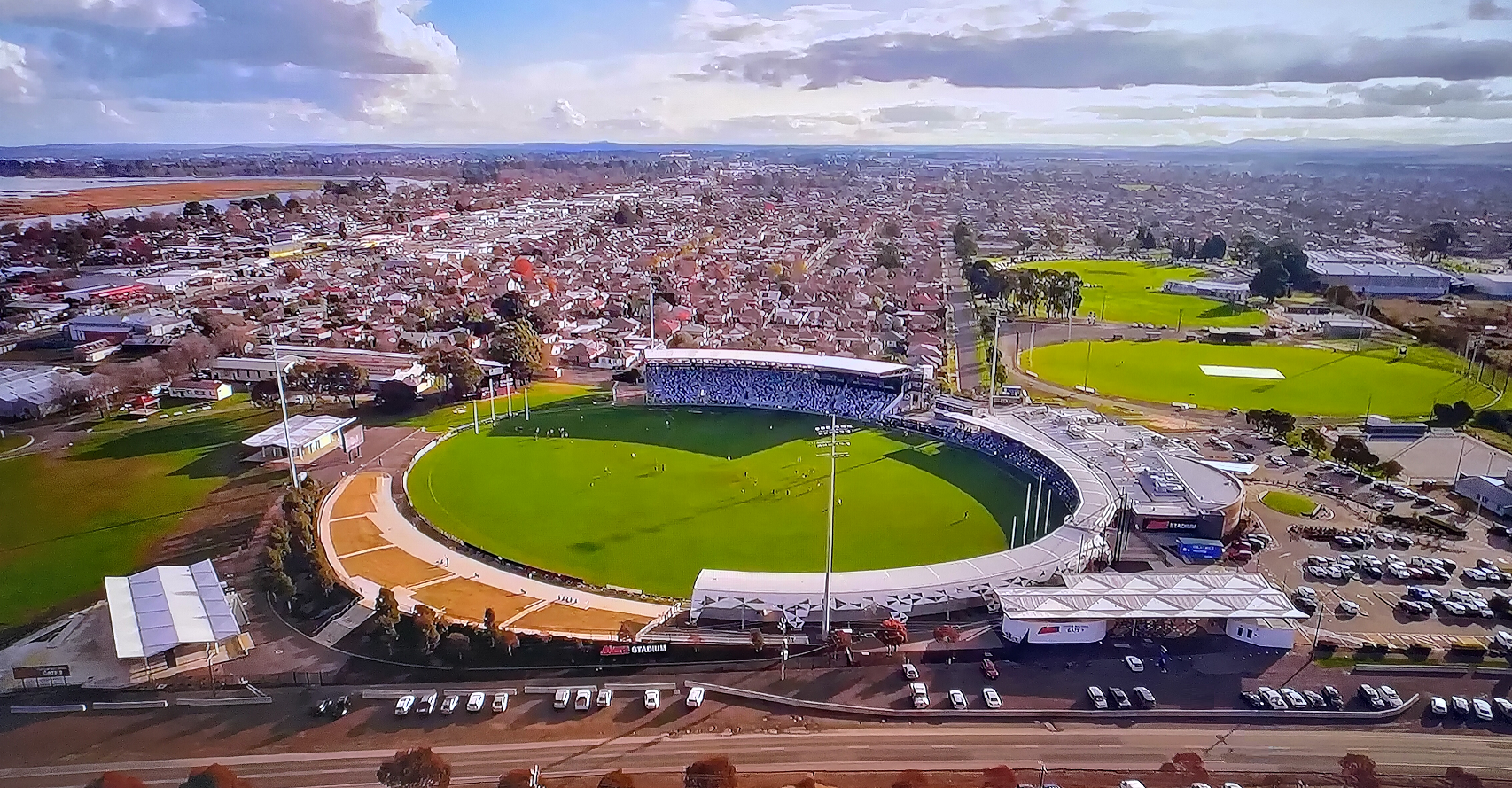
Mars Stadium

== Infrastructure ==
=== Health ===
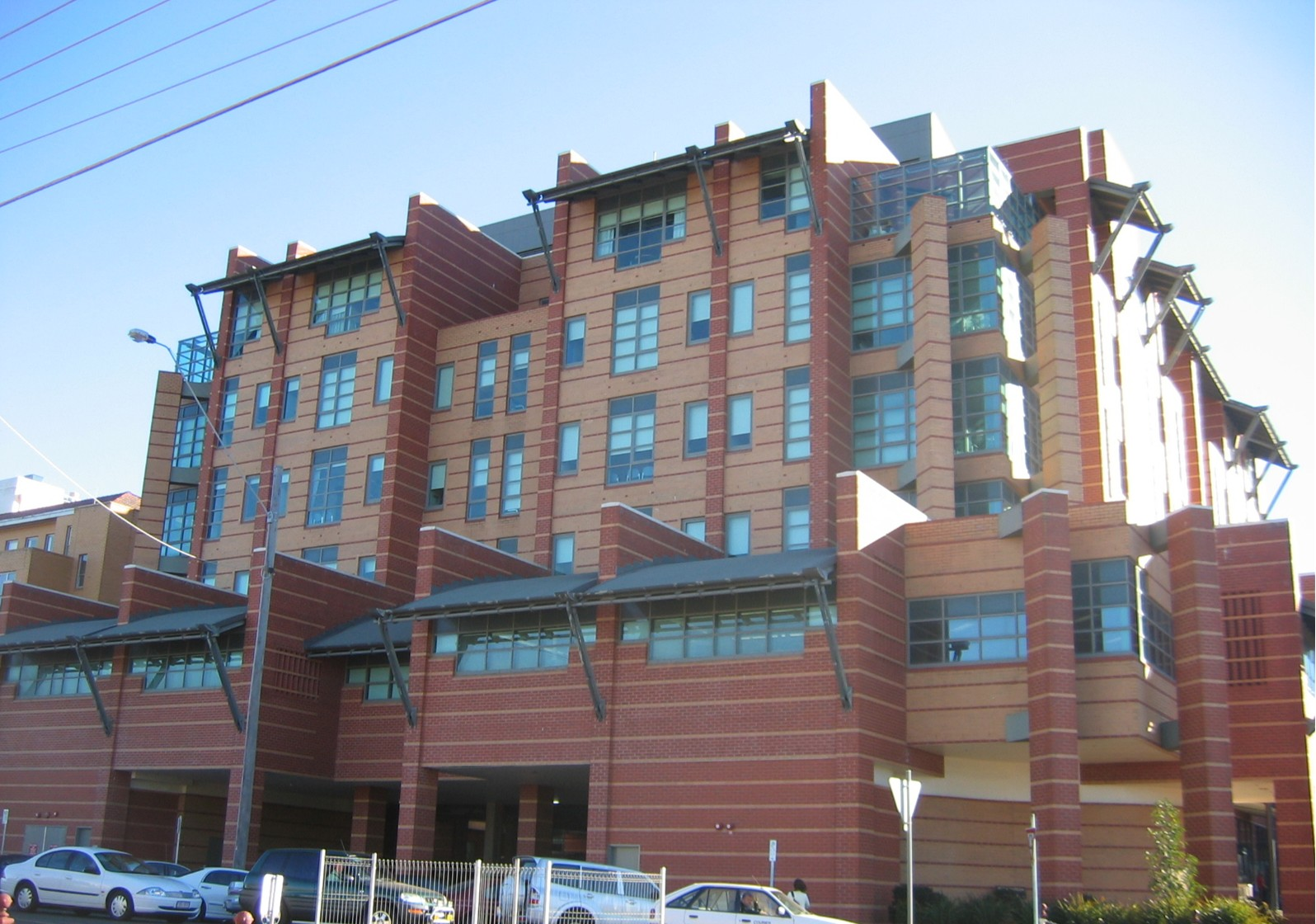
Ballarat Base Hospital's Henry Bolte wing

Ballarat has two major hospitals. The public health services are managed by Grampians Health Ballarat including the Ballarat Base which services the entire region and the Queen Elizabeth Centre for aged care on Ascot Street Sth. The St John of God Health Care centre also on Drummond Street Nth, established in 1915 is currently the largest private hospital in regional Victoria.

The Ballarat Regional Integrated Cancer Centre (BRICC) on the corner of Drummond and Sturt Street includes facilities focused on cancer treatment.

The Heart Foundation did a study in 2014 that Ballarat had the highest level of physical inactivity (85.3 per cent) in Australia and that 32.9 per cent of residents were deemed obese.

=== Utilities ===
Ballarat's residents are serviced by a wide range of public utilities including water, gas and electricity, telephony and data communications supplied, overseen and regulated by state based authorities and private enterprise and local council.

Water supply as well as sewage collection and disposal are provided by Central Highlands Water. Drinking water is sourced from a network reservoirs all located in the highlands to the east, but the majority is sourced from two main reservoirs—Lal Lal and White Swan. The Lal Lal Reservoir (built in 1970 with a capacity of 59,500 megalitres (1.57×10^{10} US gallons)) is Ballarat's largest water catchment, accounting for approximately two-thirds of the city's water usage. The White Swan reservoir (built in 1952 with a 14,100 Ml (3.7×10^{9} US gal) capacity) supplies most of the remainder. Since May 2008, the White Swan has been topped up by water from Bendigo's Sandhurst Reservoir through the Goldfields Superpipe with water originally sourced from the Goulburn River system. Kirks Reservoir (built between 1860 and 1862 with a capacity of 400 Ml (110,000,000 US gal)) and Gong Gong Reservoir (built in 1877 at Gong Gong, Victoria with a capacity of 1,902 Ml (502,000,000 US gal)) are historic main water supplies now maintained for emergency use. Other reservoirs supplying Ballarat include Moorabool reservoir (located in Bolwarrah, Victoria with a capacity of 6,738 Ml (1.780×10^{9} US gal)), Wilson's Reservoir (located in the Wombat State Forest with a capacity of 1,013 Ml (268,000,000 US gal)), Beales reservoir (built 1863 located at Wallace with a capacity of 415 Ml (110,000,000 US gal)) and Pincotts reservoir (built 1867 located at Leigh Creek, Victoria with a capacity of 218 Ml (58,000,000 US gal)). Sewage is managed by two plants—the Ballarat North Wastewater Treatment Plant and the Ballarat South Waste Water Treatment Plant.

Residential electricity is supplied by Victorian electricity distributor Powercor, while residential natural gas is supplied by AGL Energy.

Telephone services are provided via the Doveton Street (BRAT) telephone exchange which was originally built by the Australian Telecommunications Commission (now known as Telstra) who remains its owner, though Optus now also operates services from this facility. The city's cellular network currently uses Universal Mobile Telecommunications System (UMTS). Telstra has provided mobile telecommunications to Ballarat since 2003 (initially as CDMA). Optus provided competition with its entrance to the market in 2003 along with significant service upgrades in 2004 followed by Vodafone in mid-2009.

Data communications are provided by several companies. Telstra was the first company to provide dial-up Internet access via the Ballarat exchange. However, the first network for broadband Internet access available in the city was a hybrid optical fiber cable and coaxial cable built by Neighbourhood Cable in 2001. Since then, Telstra and Optus have entered the Ballarat market, providing Asymmetric digital subscriber line (ADSL) services for residential Internet access from four main exchanges—Ballarat, Wendouree (Howitt Street), Sebastopol (Skipton Street) and Alfredton (Cuthberts Road). These companies also provide mobile data access Evolved HSPA and since late 2011 3GPP Long Term Evolution (4G). Ballarat's rollout of the National Broadband Network (NBN) is seen as vital for the city's growing IT industry. During Ballarat's first stage NBN rollout in 2012, 17,800 homes were directly connected to the network via optical fibre cable.

== Transportation ==
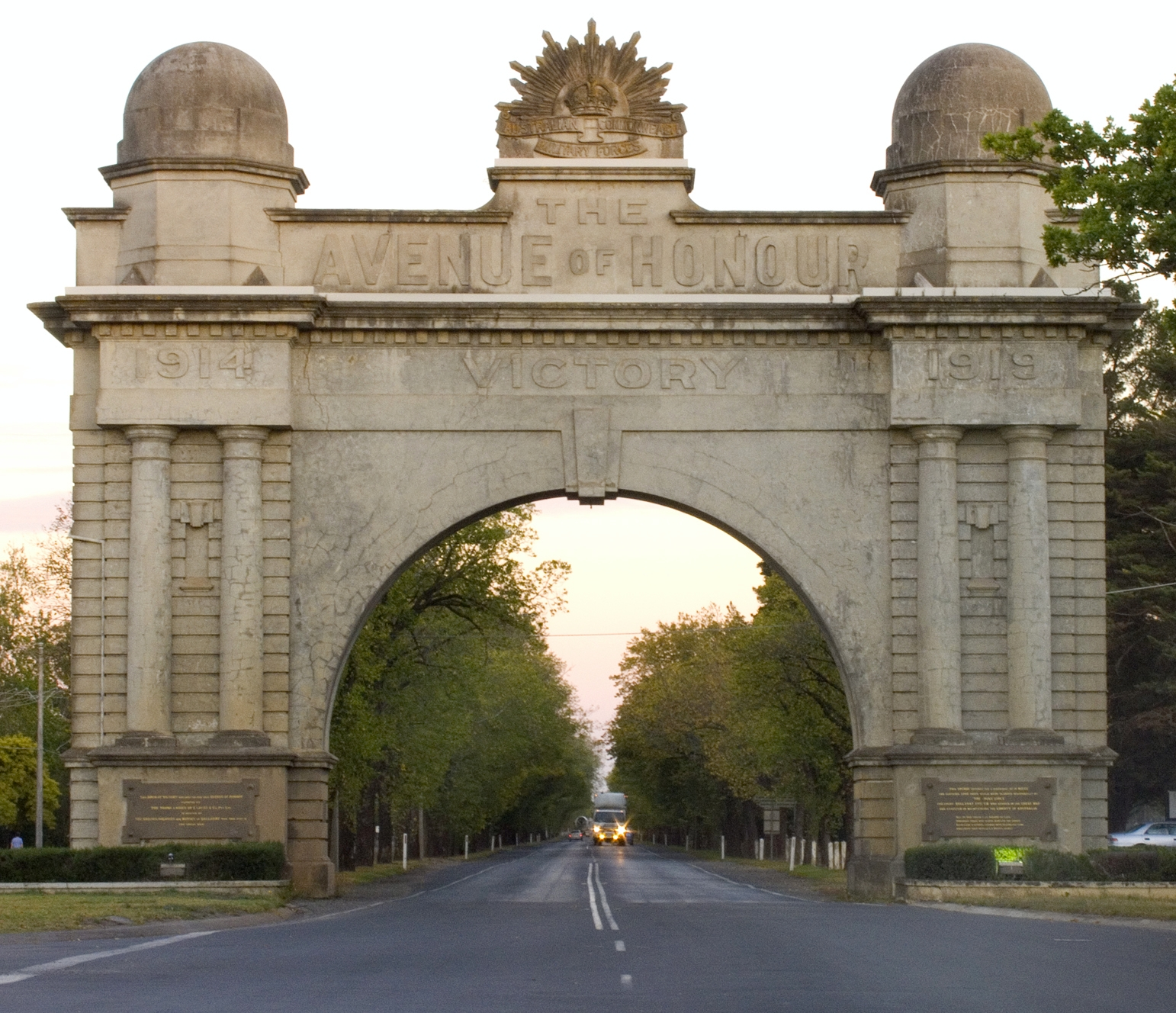
Arch of Victory over the Avenue of Honour

The motor vehicle is the main form of transport in Ballarat. A network of state highways radiate from Ballarat and the Western Freeway (A8) dual carriageway bypasses the central city to the north of the urban area, providing a direct road connection to Melbourne (approximately 90 minutes), westward to Ararat (approximately 75 minutes) and Horsham. Five freeway interchanges service the urban area, East Ballarat (half diamond) interchange at Victoria Street (C805); Brown Hill interchange (full diamond) at Daylesford-Ballarat Road (C292), Creswick Road interchange (full diamond) at Wendouree (A300); the Mount Rowan interchange (half diamond) at Gillies Road, Wendouree (C307) and the Mitchell Park interchange (full diamond) at Howe Street (C287). The Midland Highway is a dual carriageway which runs north along Creswick Road to the Western Freeway interchange but becomes a single carriageway north of Ballarat to Creswick (approximately 25 minutes) and runs south as the dual carriageway of Skipton Road to Magpie before becoming a single carriageway to Geelong (approximately 87 minutes). The Glenelg Highway connects directly to Mount Gambier and the Sunraysia Highway west of Ballarat which connects directly to Mildura. Sturt Street and Victoria Street, both dual carriageways carry the bulk of the east-west CBD traffic, while Mair Street is planned to become a four lane dual carriageway to relieve pressure on these main streets. Other dual carriageway main roads in the west include Howitt Street and Gillies Street. The busiest roads by far are located in the west and south at Albert Street in Redan, Sturt Street in Newington and Gillies Street in Lake Gardens which carry 22,400, 22,000 and 21,500 vehicles per day respectively. All have four traffic lanes.

=== Rail ===
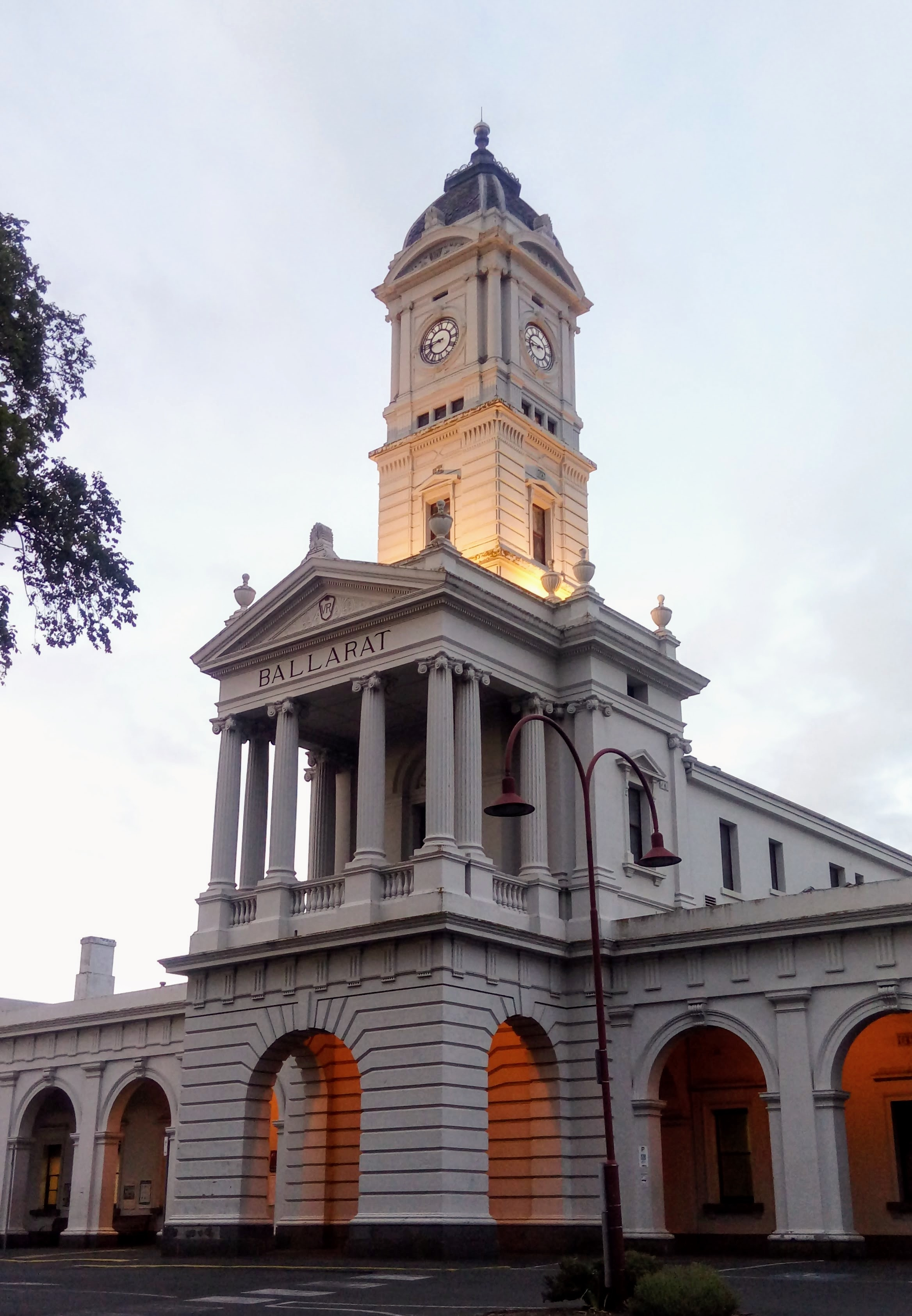
Ballarat railway station

A V/Line train arriving at Ballarat station

Ballarat is a major rail transport hub in Victoria. Situated at the junction of the Ballarat line, Ararat line and Mildura line, it has several connections for both passenger rail services and freight rail. The city has two passenger railway stations, the hub of Ballarat railway station and suburban Wendouree railway station. From Ballarat station, V/Line operates VLocity trains to Melbourne, west to Ararat and north to Maryborough. Since the controversial removal of "flagship" express services in 2011, successive timetable changes have slowed peak hour services to Southern Cross, with the current journey taking a minimum of 73 minutes. Patronage, however, has continued to grow. The Regional Rail Link project was built in 2015 to separate Ballarat trains from Melbourne's suburban rail network. Interurban services (Ballarat-Melbourne) now run half-hourly during weekday peak and hourly during weekday non-peak and on weekends from Ballarat station. A twice daily (thrice daily on weekdays) (57 minute) service connects Ballarat to Ararat (stopping at Beaufort) while there is a (53 minute) service to and from Maryborough (stopping at Creswick, Clunes, and Talbot) once a day (twice a day on weekdays) each way. Victoria's electronic ticketing system, Myki, was implemented on rail services between Wendouree and Melbourne on 24 July 2013. Ballarat is connected to Geelong by rail via the Geelong–Ballarat railway line, which currently operates only for freight.

=== Bus ===
CDC Ballarat operates the bus network covering the city centre, Ballarat and Wendouree stations, and most surrounding suburbs, contracted by Public Transport Victoria.

=== Tram ===
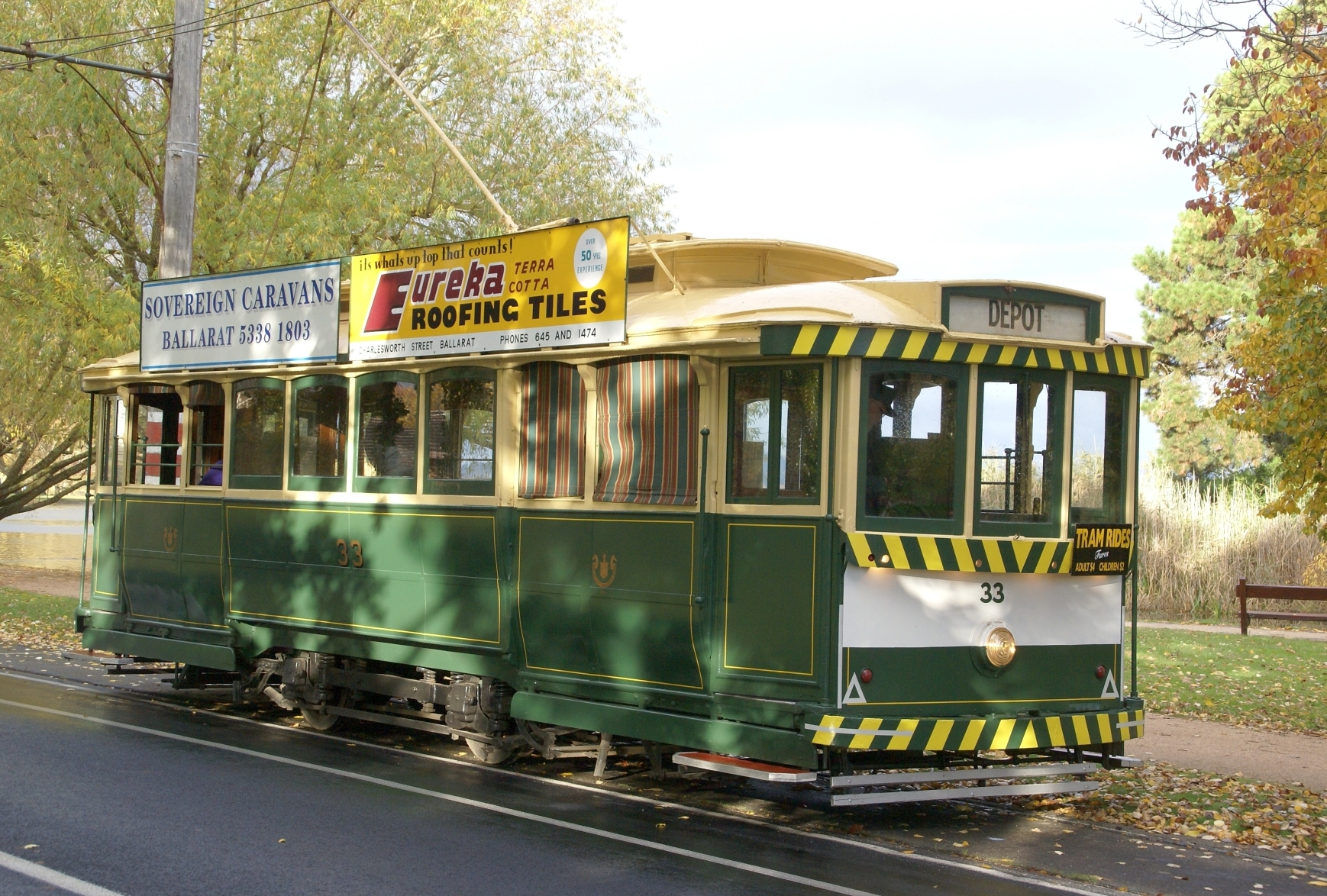
A tourist tram on Wendouree Parade

The once extensive Ballarat tramway network operated between 1887 and 1971 with a small section of remaining track being utilised as a tourist and museum tramway. There have been proposals to extend the network, particularly as a major tourist facility but also to connect it to the railways and return it as a viable component of the Ballarat public transport system, including a strong lobby in 2001–2002, 2010–11 and 2014; however, Ballarat City Council and federal member of parliament have dismissed recent proposals.

=== Airport ===
Ballarat Airport located 8 km (5 mi) north-west of the CBD consists of two sealed runways (each approximately 1,400 m (4,600 ft) long and 30 m (98 ft) wide) as well as extensive sealed aprons, night lighting and NDB navaid. Master Plans for the Airport were completed in 2005 and subsequently 2013. The report made a series of recommendations and forecasts that included lengthening, widening and strengthening of the existing main runway, consideration for expansion of the passenger terminal, recommendations for future use of aprons, and development of future structures supporting larger aircraft that would result from the forecast increased frequent usage. In 2020, initial Federal funding was provided to enable the re-building and re-instatement of the main north–south runway to 1900m (6233 feet).

=== Cycling and walking ===
Ballarat has a long history of cycling as a form of transport and recreation. The current cycling network continues to grow and consists of several marked on-road routes and 50 kilometres (31 miles) of segregated bicycle facilities including several main routes: the Ballarat–Skipton Rail Trail and the Yarrowee River Trail with connections to the Gong Gong Reservoir. Buningyong Trail, Sebastopol Trail, and the Lake Wendouree shared path. The Ballarat Bicycle Users Group provides advocacy for the growing number of cyclists in the city. The popularity of cycling in Ballarat is also demonstrated by the large number of spectators and participants drawn to cycling sporting events held in the city.

== Crime ==
In 2014, the city was one of a number of Australian regional centres examined by an ABC Four Corners report on the use of methamphetamine, along with Devonport, Burnie, Castlemaine and St Arnaud.

== See also ==
- List of people from Ballarat
- South Street Society
- Royal South Street Eisteddfod

== Bibliography ==
History books

- Bate, Weston. Lucky City: The First Generation of Ballarat 1851–1901 (1978)
- Bate, Weston. Life After Gold: Twentieth-Century Ballarat Melbourne University Press (1993)
- Carboni, Raffaello. The Eureka Stockade (1980) first published (1855)
- Goodman, David. Gold Seeking: Victorian and California in the 1850s (1994)
- Jacobs, Wendy. Ballarat: A Guide to Buildings and Areas 1851–1940 Jacob Lewis Vines Conservation Architects and Planners (1981)
- Lynch, John. The Story of the Eureka Stockade: Epic Days in the early fifties at Ballarat, (1947?)
- Flett, James. The History of Gold Discovery in Victoria
- Molony, John. Eureka, (1984)
- Molony, John. By Wendouree, (2010)
- Serle, Geoffrey. The Golden Age: A History of the Colony of Victoria, 1851–1860, (1963)
- Freund, Peter, with Val Sarah. Her Maj: A History of Her Majesty's Theatre, Ballarat (2007)
- Ballarat City Council
- Victorian Heritage Register, Heritage Victoria
