= List of places of worship in the City of Ballarat =

This is a list of places of worship in the City of Ballarat, a local government area in the state of Victoria, Australia. The list includes active and former churches and other religious buildings representing a variety of Christian denominations and other faiths.

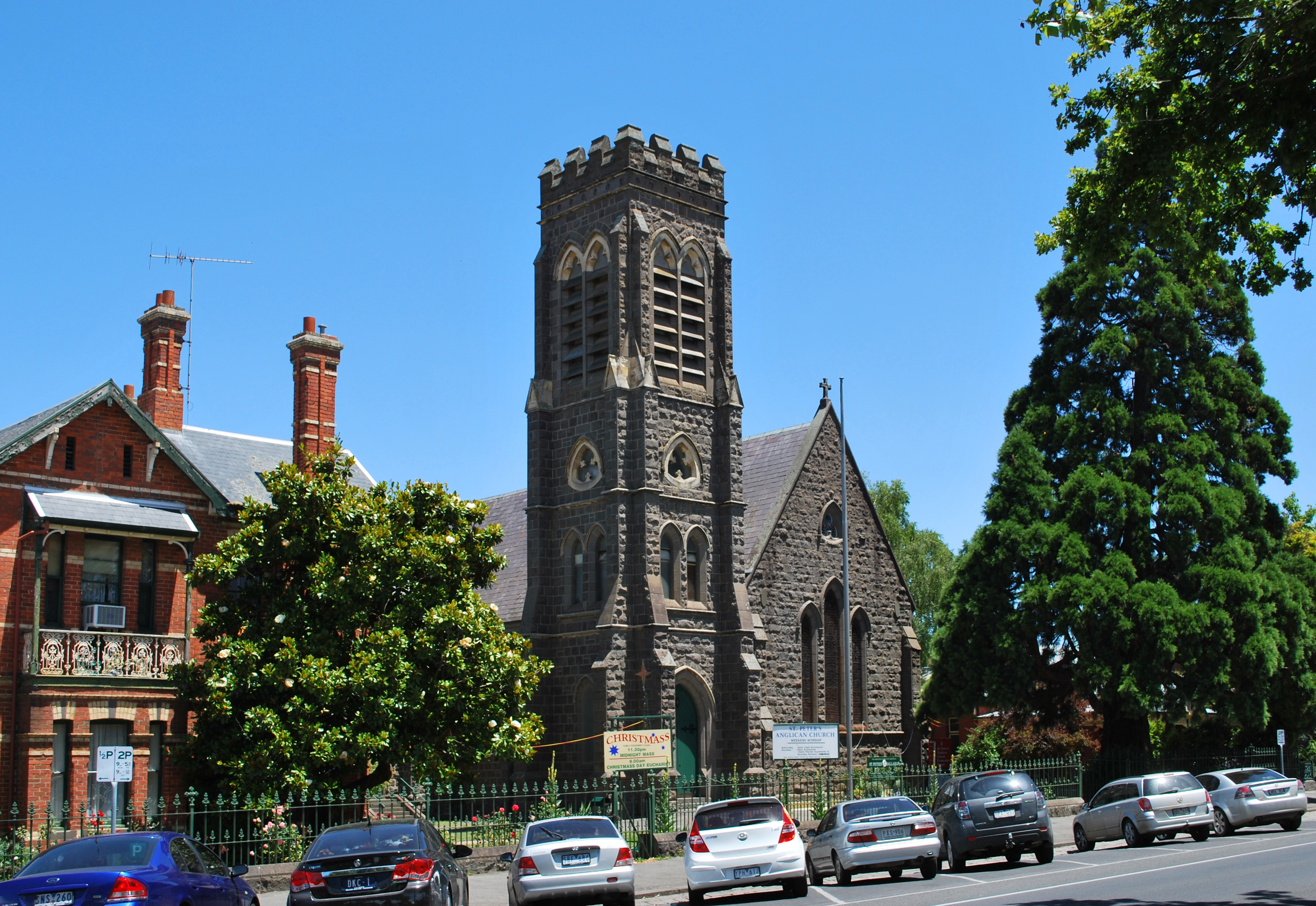
St Peter's Anglican Church, Ballarat

== Heritage listing status ==
Style	Status
Yes	Listed on the Victorian Heritage Register
–	Not listed

== Current places of worship ==
Current places of worship
Name	Image	Location	Denomination/ Affiliation	Heritage listing	Notes	Refs
Holy Trinity Anglican Church, Buninyong		Buninyong; 37.651700°S 143.883079°E	Anglican	Yes		
Buninyong Uniting Church		Buninyong; 37.651641°S 143.885577°E	Uniting (formerly Presbyterian)	Yes		
Ss Peter and Pauls' Catholic Church, Buninyong		Buninyong; 37.653962°S 143.891685°E	Catholic	–		
Wat Thai Bhavana		Mount Helen; 37.625749°S 143.908844°E	Buddhist	–		
Family Life Church		Mount Clear; 37.602585°S 143.869301°E	Church of Christ	–		
Carmel Welsh Presbyterian Church		Sebastopol; 37.604734°S 143.841064°E	Presbyterian (Welsh Presbyterian)	Yes		
St James' Catholic Church, Sebastopol		Sebastopol; 37.604455°S 143.839914°E	Catholic	–		
Grace Presbyterian Church		Sebastopol; 37.592654°S 143.825713°E	Presbyterian	–		
Kardinia Church		Sebastopol; 37.587442°S 143.841453°E	Church of Christ	–		
Ballarat Gurudwara Sahib (formerly Holy Trinity Anglican Church, Sebastopol)		Sebastopol; 37.600922°S 143.841411°E	Sikh (formerly Anglican)	Yes		
Southside Church		Redan; 37.572305°S 143.835546°E	Pentecostal	–		
St Aloysius' Catholic Church		Redan; 37.578493°S 143.837708°E	Catholic	–		
Skipton Street Uniting Church		Redan; 37.575567°S 143.845304°E	Uniting (formerly Methodist (Bible Christian))	–		
Alive Church (formerly All Saints' Anglican Church)		Ballarat; 37.567866°S 143.845772°E	Pentecostal (formerly Anglican)	–		
Ballarat Seventh-day Adventist Church		Ballarat; 37.568425°S 143.846461°E	Seventh-day Adventist	–		
St John's Lutheran Church		Ballarat; 37.566405°S 143.853446°E	Lutheran	Yes		
Ebenezer Presbyterian Church (St John's Presbyterian Church)		Ballarat; 37.566655°S 143.855057°E	Presbyterian	–		
Ballarat Central Church of Christ (Peel Street Church of Christ)		Ballarat; 37.565141°S 143.863609°E	Church of Christ	–		
Cathedral of Christ the King		Ballarat; 37.563597°S 143.857972°E	Anglican	Yes		
St Patrick's Cathedral		Ballarat; 37.56211°S 143.85204°E	Catholic	Yes		
St Andrew's Uniting Church (St Andrew's Kirk)		Ballarat; 37.560851°S 143.853027°E	Uniting (formerly Presbyterian)	Yes		
Hilltop Church (Dawson Street Congregational Church) (Ballarat Congregational Church)		Ballarat; 37.559408°S 143.853459°E	Pentecostal (formerly Congregational)	Yes		
St Paul's Anglican Church, Bakery Hill		Bakery Hill; 37.563276°S 143.866034°E	Anglican	Yes		
Ballarat Synagogue		Ballarat East; 37.562699°S 143.870157°E	Judaism	Yes		
St Alipius' Catholic Church		Ballarat East; 37.562099°S 143.871972°E	Catholic	–		
Ballarat Greek Orthodox Church (St Nicholas Greek Orthodox Church) (formerly Humffray Street Methodist Church)		Ballarat East; 37.557855°S 143.873127°E	Greek Orthodox (formerly Methodist (Bible Christian))	Yes		
York Street Church of Christ		Ballarat East; 37.569166°S 143.880535°E	Church of Christ	–		
Brown Hill Uniting Church		Brown Hill; 37.553415°S 143.893794°E	Uniting (formerly Methodist)	Yes		
Ballarat Mosque (Masjid Abu Bakr As-Siddiq)		Canadian; 37.584633°S 143.876815°E	Islam	–		
St Columba's Catholic Church		Soldiers Hill; 37.545286°S 143.860360°E	Catholic	Yes		
St Thérèse the Little Flower Catholic Church		Lake Wendouree; 37.554981°S 143.821891°E	Catholic	Yes		
St John's Anglican Church, Soldiers Hill		Soldiers Hill; 37.548038°S 143.859468°E	Anglican	Yes		
Scots Presbyterian Church, Soldiers Hill		Soldiers Hill; 37.552069°S 143.859233°E	Presbyterian	Yes		
Ballarat New Apostolic Church		Soldiers Hill; 37.556071°S 143.862170°E	New Apostolic Church	–		
St Matthew's Anglican Church, Wendouree		Wendouree; 37.539956°S 143.831764°E	Anglican	–		
Ballarat Church of Jesus Christ of Latter-day Saints		Wendouree; 37.537238°S 143.833684°E	Church of Jesus Christ of Latter-day Saints	–		
one2one (Gillies Street Church of Christ)		Alfredton; 37.565919°S 143.816216°E	Church of Christ	–		
St Peter's Anglican Church		Ballarat; 37.560366°S 143.840436°E	Anglican	Yes		
Connect Baptist Church		Wendouree; 37.527608°S 143.833330°E	Baptist	–		
Ballarat United Pentecostal Church		Wendouree; 37.526434°S 143.825075°E	Pentecostal (United Pentecostal Church)	–		
Heritage Baptist Church		Cardigan; 37.541125°S 143.787070°E	Baptist	–		
Loreto College Chapel (Childrens' Chapel)		Lake Wendouree; 37.556950°S 143.823588°E	Catholic	Yes		
Nazareth House Chapel		Lake Wendouree; 37.553128°S 143.845514°E	Catholic	Yes		
Burrumbeet Uniting Church		Burrumbeet; 37.476500°S 143.688776°E	Uniting (formerly Presbyterian)	–		
All Saints' Anglican Church, Learmonth		Learmonth; 37.425146°S 143.720992°E	Anglican	Yes		
St Patricks College Memorial Chapel		Newington; 37.559665°S 143.831244°E	Catholic	–		
Clarendon College Chapel		Newington; 37.559580°S 143.834082°E	Catholic	–		
Ballarat Grammar School Chapel (Chapel of St Mark)		Wendouree; 37.538936°S 143.830272°E	Anglican	–		
Ballarat Central Uniting Church		Ballarat; 37.564412°S 143.857663°E	Uniting (formerly Methodist)	Yes		

== Former places of worship ==
Former places of worship
Name	Image	Location	Denomination/ Affiliation	Heritage listing	Notes	Refs
Buninyong Methodist Church		Buninyong; 37.652904°S 143.882696°E	Methodist	–		
Scotchmans Lead Methodist Church		Buninyong; 37.661610°S 143.852662°E	Methodist	–		
St Joseph's Orphanage Chapel		Sebastopol; 37.605098°S 143.830650°E	Catholic	Yes		
Sebastopol Uniting Church (Ballarat South Uniting Church)		Sebastopol; 37.590694°S 143.840583°E	Uniting (formerly Methodist)	Yes		
Zion Congregational Church (Zion Welsh Congregational Church)		Sebastopol; 37.595488°S 143.839962°E	Congregational	–		
Rubicon Street Methodist Church		Sebastopol; 37.582123°S 143.837559°E	Methodist	Non-existant		
Ballarat Baptist Church		Ballarat; 37.562231°S 143.853576°E	Baptist	Yes		
Dawson Street Church of Christ		Ballarat; 37.562866°S 143.853401°E	Church of Christ	–		
Barkly Street Methodist Church		Ballarat East; 37.563422°S 143.869190°E	Methodist	Yes		
Wendouree Jubilee Church (Jubilee Methodist Church)		Lake Wendouree; 37.543145°S 143.830991°E	Methodist	Yes		
Wendouree Uniting Church		Wendouree; 37.527950°S 143.836563°E	Uniting	–		
Ballarat West Uniting Church (formerly St Cuthbert's Presbyterian Church)		Lake Wendouree; 37.558714°S 143.834178°E	Uniting (formerly Presbyterian)	Yes		
St Patricks College Boarding House Chapel		Lake Wendouree; 37.558510°S 143.835057°E	Catholic	–		
St James' Presbyterian Church, Miners Rest		Miners Rest; 37.479564°S 143.799122°E	Presbyterian	–		
Learmonth Uniting Church		Learmonth; 37.4232985°S 143.718488°E	Uniting (formerly Presbyterian)	Yes		
St Joseph's Catholic Church, Learmonth		Learmonth; 37.421925°S 143.714638°E	Catholic	Yes		
Pleasant Street Uniting Church		Newington; 37.563124°S 143.838029°E	Uniting (formerly Methodist)	–		
Neill Street Uniting Church		Soldiers Hill; 37.550897°S 143.860842°E	Uniting (formerly Methodist)	Yes		
Pleasant Street Baptist Church		Newington; 37.568025°S 143.837175°E	Baptist	–		
St James' Anglican Church, Nerrina		Nerrina; 37.544145°S 143.894724°E	Anglican	Yes		
Nerrina Wesleyan Methodist Church		Nerrina; 37.544661°S 143.893919°E	Wesleyan Methodist	Yes		
Invermay Uniting Church		Invermay; 37.520228°S 143.875349°E	Uniting (formerly Methodist)	–		
Coghills Creek Wesleyan Methodist Church		Coghills Creek; 37.384449°S 143.757835°E	Wesleyan Methodist	Yes		
St David's Uniting Church, Coghills Creek		Coghills Creek; 37.395276°S 143.773540°E	Uniting (formerly Presbyterian)	–		

== See also ==
- List of places of worship in Golden Plains Shire
- List of places of worship in the City of Greater Geelong
- List of places of worship in the Rural City of Horsham
