= 2011 Victoria floods =

2011 weather disaster in Victoria, Australia

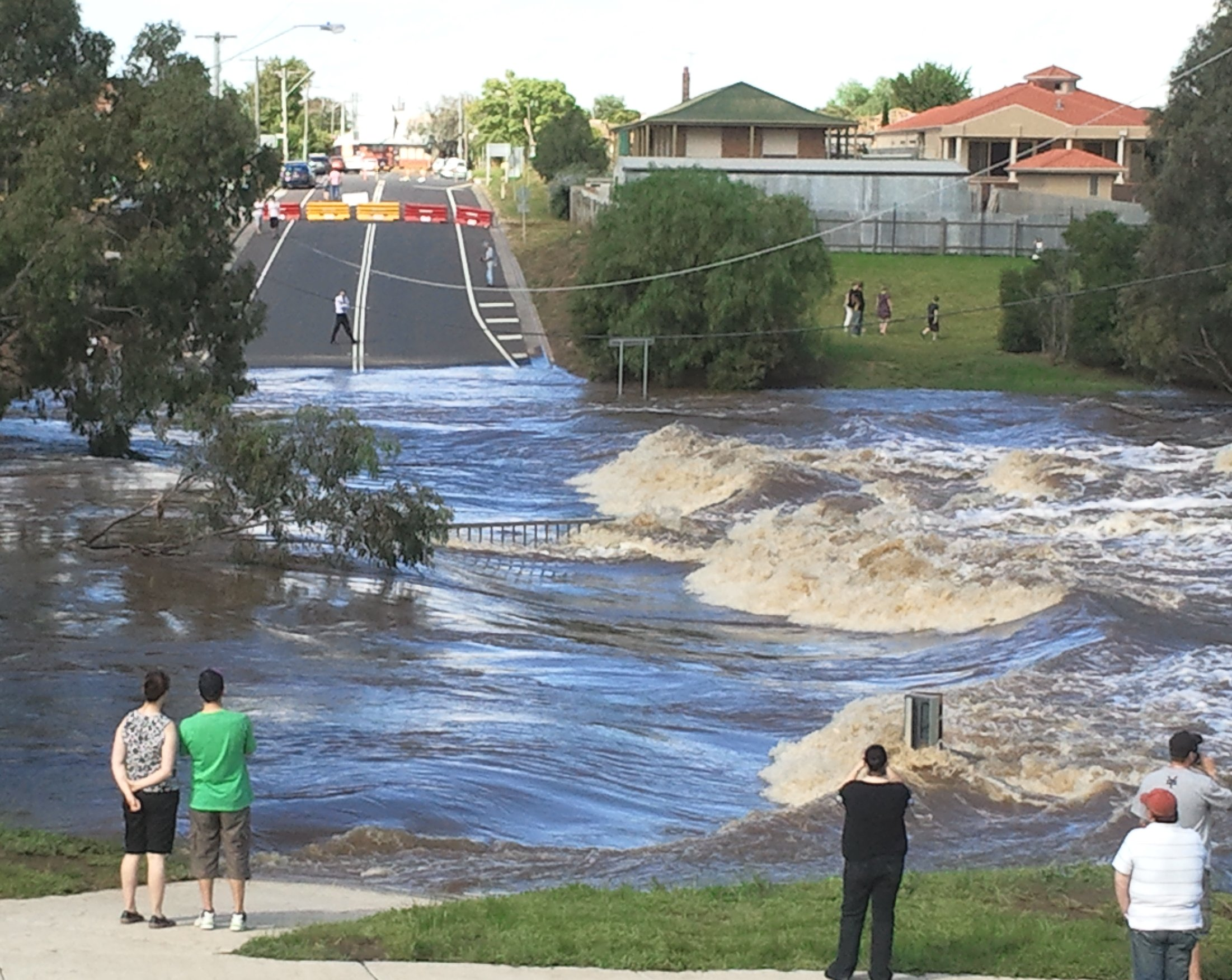
- Werribee River in flood at Werribee
- Date: 12 January – 19 April 2011
- Location: Much of central and northern Victoria including cities of Horsham, Shepparton and Swan Hill as well as towns Charlton, Rochester and Carisbrook, Beaufort, Glenorchy, Rupanyup, Murrabit Echuca, Bridgewater on Loddon, Creswick, Clunes, Kerang, Warracknabeal and Skipton.
- Deaths: 2 confirmed dead
- Property damage: A$ 2 billion

High intensity rainfall between 12–14 January 2011 caused major flooding across much of the western and central parts of the Australian state of Victoria. Several follow-up heavy rainfall events including Tropical Low Yasi caused repeated flash flooding in affected areas in early February in many of the communities affected by January's floods.

Many of the towns were previously affected by floods in September 2010, however the 2011 event was more severe, affecting at least four times as many properties with thousands of evacuations being called for by the State Emergency Service. As of 18 January, more than 51 communities had been affected by the floods. A total of over 1,730 properties had been flooded. Over 17,000 homes lost their electricity supply. The floods forced VicRoads to close hundreds of roads; and train services were also disrupted. The floods devastated farms with 51,700 hectares of pasture and 41,200 hectares of field crops flooded and 6,106 sheep killed. The Victorian Employers Chamber of Commerce and Victorian Farmers Union initially estimated that damages would amount to hundreds of millions of dollars, but the Department of Primary Industries later calculated a damage bill of up to A$ 2 billion.

Kevin Parkyn, a senior forecaster with the Bureau of Meteorology said, "Victoria is experiencing one of its worst flood events in its history" after "a week in which rainfall totals have been smashed in parts of Victoria." Bureau of Meteorology senior forecaster Terry Ryan said, "It's the worst flood in western Victoria in their history as far as our records go in terms of the depth of water and the number of places affected." The Premier of Victoria, Ted Baillieu, has described it as "one of the biggest floods in the state's history."

== Background ==
The strongest La Niña event since 1973 which fuelled the extensive flooding across Victoria in September 2010, brought wetter conditions across eastern Australia including the 2010–11 Queensland floods. An already soaked state had the wettest January in its recorded history in January 2011.

A deepening low pressure trough over south-east Australia, fed with tropical moisture from the monsoon across the state as well as northern Tasmania, southern New South Wales and eastern parts of South Australia.

During the downpour across the state flash flooding occurred in places such as Halls Gap and Beaufort, resulting in damage to businesses and homes. However, it was not until the downpour began to subside (and fair weather returned) that the accumulated water caused waterways across the region gradually to swell. As waterways began to break their banks, evacuations were called. Despite clearing conditions, flooding continued to spread during January and into February 2011 as it developed into what was increasingly described by the media as an "inland sea" across agricultural north-west Victoria.

== Early warning and evacuation ==
Rising rivers led to evacuations in many other towns in central and western Victoria:

- Allansford & Jubilee Park - 10 people evacuated on 16 January to Archie Graham Centre. Frank Street and Station Street sandbagged.
- Charlton evacuated to Donald
- Glenorchy
- Rupanyup
- Carisbrook - 1,000 evacuated to Maryborough
- Creswick
- Halls Gap
- Kerang
- Quambatook
- Warracknabeal
- Quantong
- Dimboola
- Jeparit
- Kerang - 224 residents evacuated
- Horsham - 1,000 households told to evacuate
- Cohuna
- Barham
- Beulah
- Dimboola
- Nelson

== Major waterways affected ==
- Wimmera River
- Loddon River
- Campaspe River
- Avoca River
- Hopkins River
- Werribee River
- Goulburn River
- Yarra River
- Mount Emu Creek
- Yarriambiack Creek
- Yarrowee River
- Glenelg River

== Settlements affected ==
- Beaufort - creeks running to Lake Beaufort broke their banks, flooding the town's main street and over 70 houses

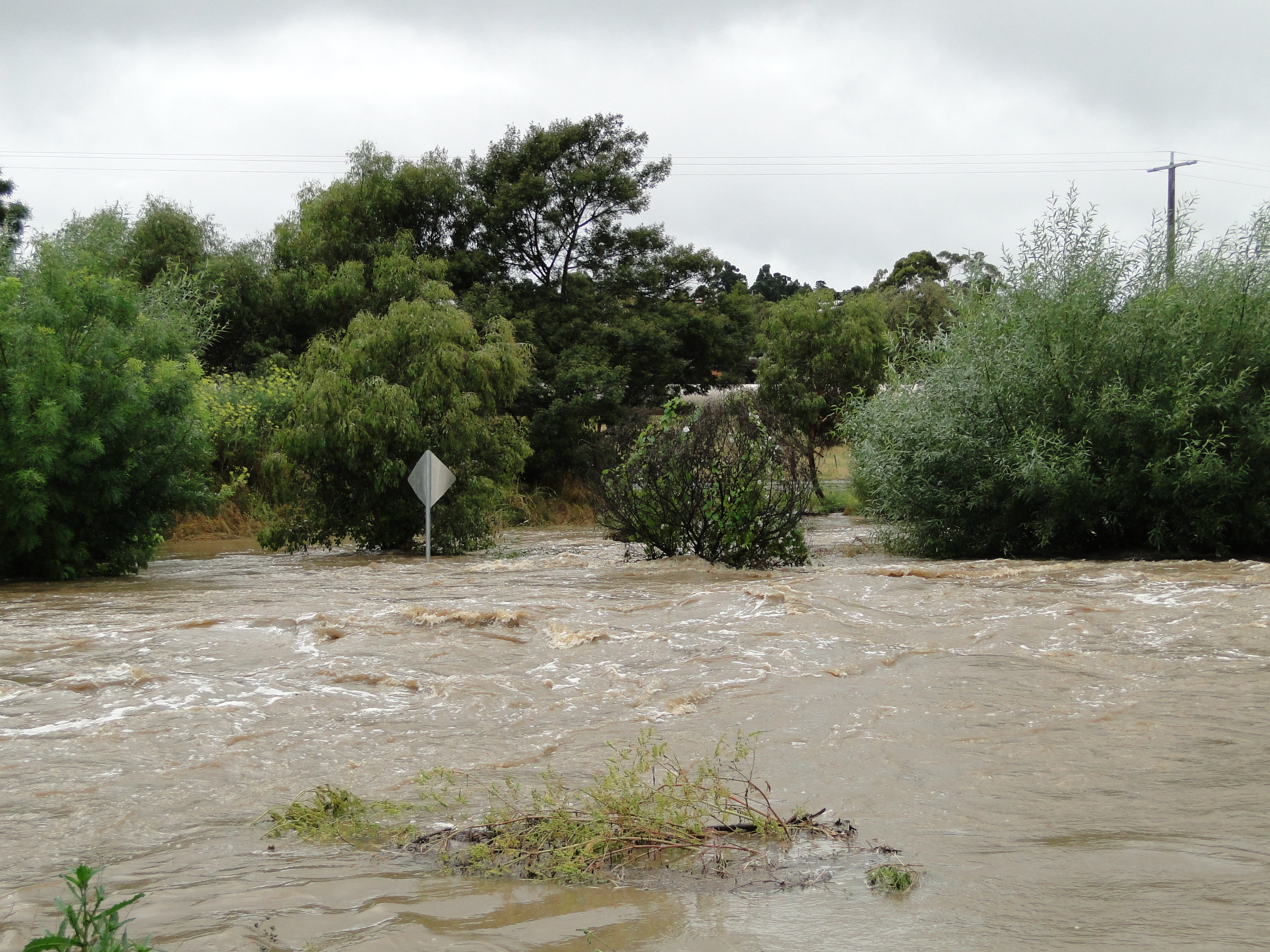
Flooding of the Yarrowee River between the Ballarat suburbs of Redan and Mount Pleasant on 13 January

- Ballarat - record rainfall in Ballarat (95 millimetres) caused flooding in the Yarrowee catchment. Twenty houses were flooded across the urban area including 10 houses in the outer suburb of Miners Rest as the Burrumbeet Creek overflowed as well as properties in Alfredton and Delacombe. The first spill-over of Lake Wendouree since 2002 occurred after it had been artificially filled in 2010 since drying up due to drought in 2007. A road bridge at Ascot was destroyed, as was a pedestrian bridge over the Yarrowee at Whitehorse Road in Sebastopol and Mount Helen.
- Bridgewater on Loddon - two flood peaks were experienced, the first on 14 January and the second the following day. The floodwaters affected around 50 houses, as well as the police station, caravan park, hotel and other businesses.
- Carisbrook - covered by "four or five feet" of water and a total of 275 houses flooded.
- Charlton - more than 400 houses were flooded after the Avoca broke its banks. An electrical substation was also affected, which caused power outages to 8,000 properties in the surrounding towns.
- Creswick - evacuated after the Creswick Creek breached its banks, flooding the town centre. 35 houses and businesses were breached by water in the largest flood in the town's recorded history.
- Echuca - 200 non-levee protected houses were flooded as waters from the Campaspe peaked on 16 January
- Halls Gap - evacuated after flash flooding and landslides threatened to cut off the town.

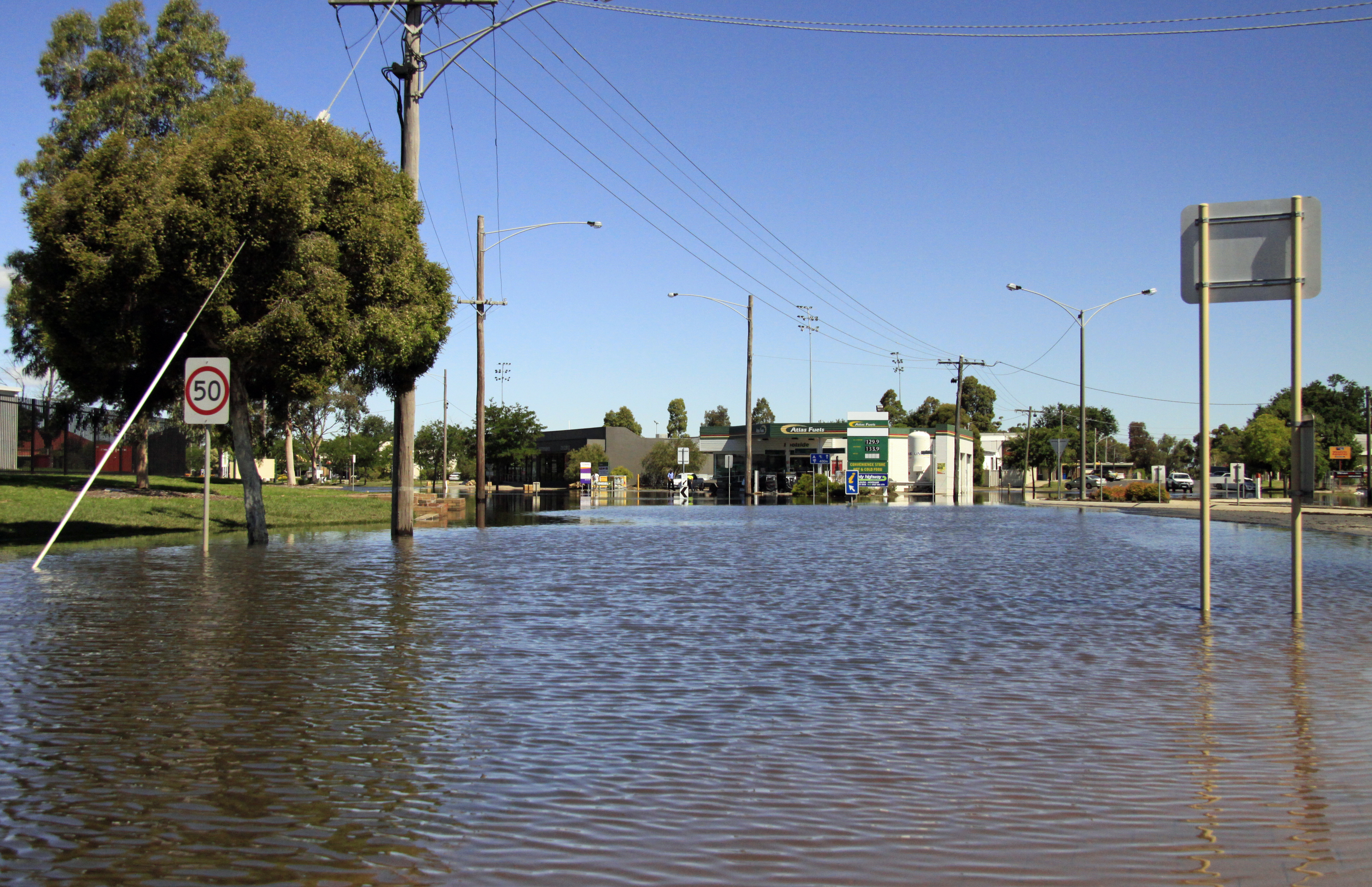
Flooding at Firebrace Street in Horsham, 19 January

- Horsham - flood waters divided the town in two and flooded 600 houses. Areas close to the centre of town are under up to a metre of water. Flooding has been described as a one-in-200-year event.
- Kerang - Levee failed on 19 January, causing widespread flooding affecting nearly 4,000 people
- Melbourne - flash flooding swelled the Yarra River (breaking its banks at South Yarra) and Maribyrnong River; flash flooding closed roads at Footscray, South Melbourne, North Melbourne, St Kilda, Research, Tarneit and Maribyrnong. During the 7 February event, Melbourne's south eastern suburbs were flash flooded including Glen Waverley, Narre Warren, Pakenham, Koo Wee Rup and Berwick.
- Newbridge - floods caused major damage to the Newbridge Recreation Reserve.
- Rochester - worst floods in its history with around 200 houses, representing 80% of the community, inundated.
- Serpentine
- Shepparton (and Mooroopna) - over 50 houses flooded and 500 houses isolated after the Goulburn flooded.
- Skipton - split in two by 1 metre (3.3 ft) of water through the main street of town, flooding the pub, supermarket and pharmacy a total of 9 houses and 20 businesses were flooded The town was previously affected by the 2010 Victorian floods.
- Swan Hill
- Warracknabeal

== Infrastructure ==
=== Road closures ===
- Calder Highway (Marong)
- Pyrenees Highway (between Newstead and the Castlemaine-Maldon Rd)
- Wimmera Highway (between Newbridge, Logan and St Arnaud)
- All roads to Kerang
- Murray Valley Highway (between Cohuna and Swan Hill)
- Princes Highway (between Ayresford Road and the Great Ocean Road)
- Sunraysia Highway (both directions at Lexton)

=== Rail closures ===
V/Line temporarily closed all passenger services.

- Yungera railway line
- Deniliquin railway line
- Ararat railway line
- Mildura railway line

=== Power outages ===
The flooding caused power outages across the state including areas supplied by the Charlton Zone Substation which was directly affected by rising waters.

- Bendigo
- Ballarat and Ballan (2,100 homes)
- Kyneton
- Swan Hill (2,400 homes) on 20 January
- Gisborne (500 homes)
- Macedon and Woodend (1700 homes)
- Maldon
- Wedderburn
- St Arnaud
- Donald
- Birchip
- Wycheproof
- Boort

== Deaths ==
On 18 January, a police diver found the body of a boy who went missing in a flooded billabong, off the Goulburn River, on 17 January at Shepparton in north-east Victoria.

On 5 February, the death of a man after falling off the roof of his Glen Waverley home trying to stem a leak was attributed to the flash flooding.

== Response ==
The Australian Defence Force (ADF) assisted the Victorian State Emergency Service (VICSES) from 14 January 2011.

The South Australian State Emergency Service sent a deployment team over to the emergency base in Horsham working up north along the Yarriambiack Creek. The 20-person team made up from units in Adelaide, Mt. Gambier, Murray Bridge, Renmark, Berri and Keith spent 5 days assisting the Victorian SES between 18 January 2011 and 22 January 2011.

Premier Ted Ballieu toured flood affected areas on 17 January, announcing an A$7 million relief package, including a A$5 million clean-up fund and a A$1 million public appeal coordinated by the Red Cross. On 18 January, the Federal Government pledged A$4 million in relief funds.

Three platoons from Victoria's 4th Reserve Response Force (4RRF), under the command of Headquarters 4th Brigade, conducted Rapid Impact Assessments (RIA) on townships identified by VICSES since 20 January, to provide information on the impact of the floods on community and private infrastructure.

ADF personnel delivered relief items including almost 200,000 sandbags, various emergency stores, fuel, sand, water and bedding to a number of communities in the flood-affected region. In addition, a RAAF aircraft transported 76,000 ADF sandbags from Townsville and Brisbane to Melbourne on 22–23 January.

By 24 January, RIAs had been completed for the towns of Charlton, Hamilton, Glenorchy, Halls Gap, Rochester, Bridgewater, Carisbrook, Dunolly, Clunes, Creswick, Appin South, Kerang West, Skipton, Newbridge and Horsham.

On 24 January the ADF committed two Royal Australian Navy (RAN) Seahawk helicopters for providing support to Victorian flood relief and recovery efforts in addition to approximately 100 personnel and more than 40 land vehicles.

The Prime Minister of Australia, Julia Gillard, toured flood affected areas from 28 January. Victorian Premier Ted Ballieu publicly criticised the Prime Minister for forgetting her home state while she pushed for a controversial flood levy to repair Queensland's flood damage.

In March 2011, the Queen's eldest grandson, Prince William, toured the affected areas in Victoria, as well as those damaged by the floods in Queensland.

In April 2011, Scouts Australia's Victorian Branch replaced its traditional Hoadley Hide hiking event with the Hoadley Project, where hundreds of Venturer and Rover Scouts assisted residents of Charlton, Rochester and Murrabit in the continuing cleanup effort.

== See also ==
- March 2010 Victoria storms
- September 2010 Victoria floods
- 2022 south eastern Australia floods
