= Winter Valley =

- Suburb
- Interactive map of Winter Valley
- Coordinates: 37.5890°S 143.8140°E
- Country: Australia
- State: Victoria
- City: Ballarat
- LGA: City of Ballarat

Government
  - State electorate: Wendouree
  - Federal division: Ballarat

Population
  - Total: 3,440 (2021 census)
- Postcode: 3358
Suburbs around Winter Valley
	Alfredton
Bunkers Hill	Winter Valley	Delacombe
	Smythes Creek

Winter Valley is a western suburb of the City of Ballarat. The population at the 2021 census was 3,440. Established on 11 February 2016 as part of the western growth zone, Winter Valley was named after early colonist John Winter following a controversy on whether on not it should be named after the 19th-century Aboriginal elder Mullawallah.

== History ==
Winter Valley was established on 11 February 2016 as part of Ballarat's western growth zone. It incorporated former parts of Delacombe and Smythes Creek.

The naming of Winter Valley proved controversial in late 2014. A Wadawurrung man named Sean Fagan originally proposed the suburb be named after the 19th-century Aboriginal elder Mullawallah. Although the name was initially supported by the state government and city council, a residents' group opposing it was formed and the council received over a hundred objections. In a well-attended public gallery held on 10 December at the town hall, residents argued that Mullawallah was too hard to spell or pronounce, while others claimed it was too similar to other suburb names. Supporters of the name said that the resistance was racially motivated. Winter Valley was eventually named after Jock Winter, a prominent early colonist, while Winter's Swamp near Lucas was renamed Mullawallah Wetlands.

=== 2018 trench collapse ===
On 21 March 2018, in Winter Valley, tradies Jack Brownlee and Charlie Howkins became trapped in a construction site after a six-foot trench collapsed, leading to their deaths. In 2019, Ballarat excavation company Pipecon was charged with two occupational health and safety offences. After repeated court delays, Pipecon pleaded guilty to failing to adequately supervise the workers in November 2021 and were fined $555,000. The incident is considered key to the introduction of new industrial manslaughter legislation in Victioria in November 2019, and employers can now be sentenced up to $16.5 million in fines and 25 years of imprisonment.

In 2020, a memorial was commissioned along Kensington Creek on the Winterfield estate. It commemorates those who have died on regional work sites and is close to the site of the accident. The streets bordering the memorial were named Howkins Avenue and Brownlee Boulevard.

== Infrastructure ==
The Winter Valley emergency precinct on Mirelle Drive contains a fire station and police complex.
