= Ballarat North =

Ballarat North Ballarat, Victoria
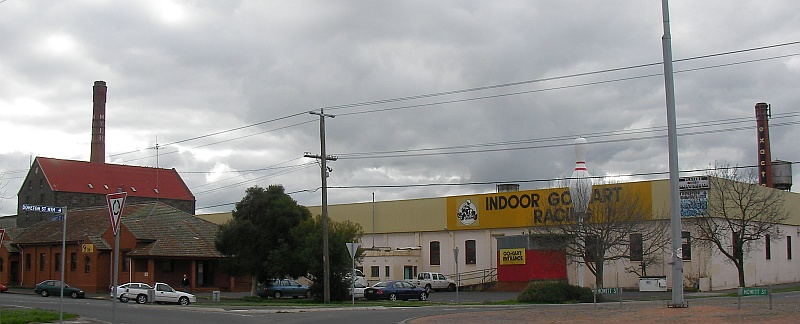
- Corner of Howitt and Doveton Streets looking north, a former industrial area now an entertainment precinct.

- Coordinates: 37.5397°S 143.8676°E
- Population: 4,041 (2021 census)
  - Density: 1,513.5/km^{2} (3,920/sq mi)
- Postcode(s): 3350
- Area: 2.67 km^{2} (1.0 sq mi)
- Location: 3 km (2 mi) from Ballarat Central
- LGA(s): City of Ballarat
- State electorate(s): Wendouree
- Federal division(s): Ballarat
Suburbs around Ballarat North:
Wendouree	Invermay Park	Nerrina
Wendouree	Ballarat North	Black Hill
Lake Wendouree	Soldiers Hill	Black Hill

Ballarat North (also known as North Ballarat) is a suburb of Ballarat, Victoria, Australia located north of Ballarat's central area. Ballarat North is bounded by Norman Street; Ballarat General Cemetery and Western Freeway to the north, Howitt Street to the south, Doodts Road to the east and the Mildura railway line to the west. At the 2021 census, Ballarat North had a population of 4,041.

Ballarat North is partly industrial and residential in nature.

== Sport ==
North Ballarat Football Club takes its name from the suburb, although its current homeground, Eureka Stadium is in neighbouring Wendouree.
