= Lake Gardens, Victoria =

Lake Gardens
- Suburb
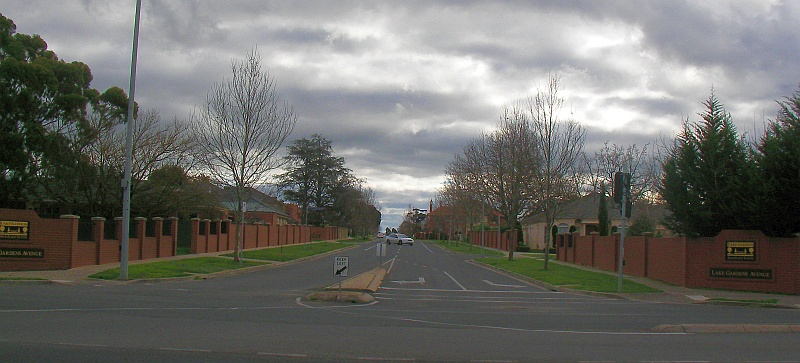
- Lake Gardens Avenue looking West from Gillies Street near the Ballarat Botanic Gardens

- Interactive map of Lake Gardens
- Coordinates: 37.546°S 143.820°E
- Country: Australia
- State: Victoria
- City: Ballarat
- LGA: City of Ballarat
- Location: 5.5 km (3.4 mi) from Ballarat Central

Government
  - State electorate: Wendouree
  - Federal division: Ballarat

Area
  - Total: 1.38 km^{2} (0.53 sq mi)

Population
  - Total: 1,801 (2021 census)
  - Density: 1,305/km^{2} (3,380/sq mi)
- Postcode: 3355
Suburbs around Lake Gardens
Wendouree	Wendouree	Wendouree
Alfredton	Lake Gardens	Lake Wendouree
Alfredton	Alfredton	Newington

Lake Gardens is a suburb on the western rural-urban fringe of Ballarat, Victoria Australia located near Lake Wendouree and directly behind the Ballarat Botanical Gardens from which the suburb draws its name. The suburb is bounded by Gillies Street to the east, O'Donnell's Road to the west and Gregory Street West to the north. The population at the 2021 census was 1,801.

Lake Gardens is almost entirely residential, laid out in street hierarchy with a centrepiece ornamental lake. It has no commercial area; the nearest shopping centres are in Wendouree to the north and Alfredton to the south.

Built on the site of a former lunatic asylum, some claim that the suburb is haunted by ghosts.

== History ==
The area of Lake Gardens was formerly open flat marshy land between Black Swamp and Winter Swamp, hunting land for the Wathaurong indigenous tribes.

In the fledgling Ballarat of the 1860s, the land west of Ballarat Botanical Gardens was set aside for Prince of Wales Recreation Reserve to the south and to the north, "Reformatory Reserve" stretching toward what was known as the Town Common. Lakeside Mental Hospital, a psychiatric asylum, was built on the Reformatory Reserve from 1877.

Following the closure of the hospital, City of Ballarat made planning provision for a new suburb on the site. Work began in early 2000 on the 650 metre circumference artificial lake to be the centrepiece surrounded by prestige homes, filled by bore water and storm water. The lake reserve is bounded by Stirling Drive to the north, Lake Gardens Drive to the south, St Cedars Grove to the west and St Glen's way and Gillies Street to the east. The main streets were planted with London plane trees.

The large detached homes were progressively built primarily in the neo-eclectic architecture style.

== Parks and open space ==
Lake Gardens is surrounded by open space with the Ballarat Botanic Gardens and former zoo grounds to the east, Wendouree Park and Ballarat Golf Course to the south and vacant land to the west. The Ballarat Aquatic building is in Lake Gardens and includes a 25 Metre eight-lane indoor heated pool.

== Transport ==
The main roads are Lake Gardens Avenue and Stirling Drive.

A bus service runs along Gillies street from Alfredton to Ballarat Station via Wendouree, Route 10. Wendouree railway station, opened in 2009 is located immediately north of the suburb in Wendouree.
