= Lucas, Victoria =

Lucas
- Suburb
- Interactive map of Lucas
- Coordinates: 37.553°S 143.771°E
- Country: Australia
- State: Victoria
- LGA: City of Ballarat
- Location: 4 km (2.5 mi) from Ballarat Central
- Established: 2011

Government
  - State electorate: Ripon
  - Federal division: Ballarat

Population
  - Total: 2,994 (2021 census)
- Postcode: 3350
Suburbs around Lucas
Cardigan	Cardigan	Lake Gardens
	Lucas	Alfredton
Bunkers Hill	Bunkers Hill	Delacombe

Lucas is a suburb of the City of Ballarat. It was created on 23 June 2011 from a former part of Cardigan. The population at the 2021 census was 2,994.

== History ==
Lucas was created on 23 June 2011 from a former part of Cardigan. It is named after Eleanor Lucas and the staff of her local textile company, dubbed the "Lucas Girls", who planted Ballarat's Avenue of Honour after World War I. Former to development, Lucas was a majority agricultural & livestock area.
