= Bonshaw, Victoria =

Bonshaw
- Suburb
- Interactive map of Bonshaw
- Coordinates: 37.6035°S 143.8156°E
- Country: Australia
- State: Victoria
- City: Ballarat
- LGA: City of Ballarat

Government
  - State electorate: Ripon
  - Federal division: Ballarat

Population
  - Total: 949 (2021 census)
- Postcode: 3352
Suburbs around Bonshaw
	Delacombe
Smythes Creek	Bonshaw	Sebastapol
	Cambrian Hill

Bonshaw is a locality on the southern rural fringe of the City of Ballarat in Victoria, Australia. At the 2021 census, Bonshaw had a population of 949. This is an increase from a population of 210 at the 2016 census and 188 at the 2011 census.

Bonshaw was named for a sheep run which John Winter purchased from George Russell and Henry Anderson, who was part of the party which first sighted the future area of Ballarat, in the 1840s. Although Anderson named it Waverley Park, Winter renamed it Bonshaw after the estate of his father-in-law.

In 2012, the city council named a watercourse in Bonshaw and Delacombe Banyule Creek. In mid-2022, an application for another housing development in Bonshaw was submitted to the council. On 1 November 2023, parts of Bonshaw was incorporated into the Wendouree district. Bonshaw is one of four precincts in the Ballarat West Growth Area, and the companies Jellis Craig and Florian Living are currently developing their own real estate projects in the locality.
