= 2010 Australian floods =

2010 Australian floods can refer to:

- March 2010 Queensland floods
- 2010 Victorian floods
- 2010–2011 Queensland floods

== See also ==
- Floods in Australia
