= Delacombe, Victoria =

Delacombe
- Suburb
- Interactive map of Delacombe
- Coordinates: 37.589°S 143.814°E
- Country: Australia
- State: Victoria
- City: Ballarat
- LGA: City of Ballarat
- Location: 6 km (3.7 mi) from Ballarat Central

Government
  - State electorate: Wendouree
  - Federal division: Ballarat

Population
  - Total: 5,408 (2021 census)
- Postcode: 3356
Suburbs around Delacombe
Alfredton	Newington	Newington
Bunkers Hill	Delacombe	Redan
Smythes Creek	Bonshaw	Sebastopol

Delacombe is a large and rapidly growing industrial/residential suburb on the south west rural-urban fringe of Ballarat, Victoria, Australia. The population at the 2021 census was 5,408 making it the fifth most populated in the Ballarat urban area.

Delacombe forms a large part of the Ballarat West Growth Area where suburban development is encouraged by the City of Ballarat and State Government of Victoria. Much of the city's planned subdivision for new housing estates is happening in Greenfield land in and around the suburb and it is predicted to be home to over 12,000 residents in 2030.

The suburb is built upon the floodplain of the Winter Creek. Its tributaries are stormwater drains, including the Banyule.

It is one of the few Ballarat suburbs with its own shopping centres and a future activity centre for the suburb is planned by the City of Ballarat.

It was named in 1965 after the then incumbent Governor of Victoria, Sir Rohan Delacombe.

== History ==
Delacombe was originally part of Ballarat West and situated in the Shire of Grenville. The first development was a factory producing guncotton for World War II.

In 1965, it was announced that the estate was to be named Delacombe after Sir Rohan Delacombe, Governor of Victoria 1963–1974. Non-military industrial and residential areas were zoned during the late 1960s.

During the 2011 Victorian floods, flash flooding caused the Banyule drain to overflow on more than one occasion, causing flooding to homes. The floods spurred implement stormwater upgrades and a flood strategy from the City of Ballarat including the creation of artificial wetlands.

== Urban form and housing ==
The majority of Delacombe's residential areas have been developed under the concepts of street hierarchy with light industry and commercial areas centred on the main streets with single-family detached homes along branching cul-de-sacs.

Delacombe Town Centre is a sub-regional shopping centre serving the western Ballarat growth area. Developed by Troon Group in 2017, it was acquired by SCA Property Group in 2021.

== Education ==
Delacombe Primary School opened in 1981. Lumen Christi Primary School is a Catholic school which opened in 1990.

== Transport ==
The main form of transport in Delacombe is the private motor car and it can be classed as a car dependent suburb and over 50% of all households with more than two vehicles. The suburb is serviced by Ballarat taxis and the Route 25 bus service operates to the city.

A branch of the disused Cattleyards freight railway line terminated in Delacombe and was proposed by the Victorian Greens transport policy as the site of a potential railway station, however the line was demolished in 2010. The nearest railway station is Wendouree 5 km to the north.

== Parks and open space ==
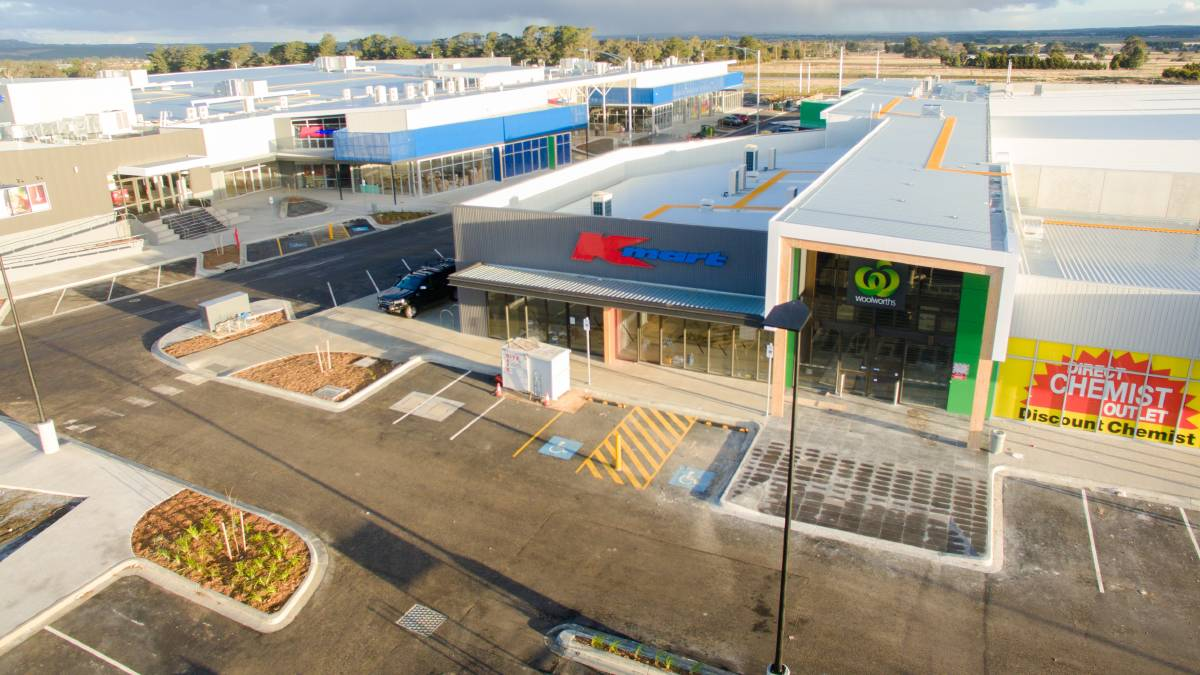
Delacombe Town Centre, August 2017

While there is still much greenfield land in Delacombe, currently the Delacombe Sports Centre is set aside as a public recreation space.

The Delacombe wetlands are currently under construction. Storm water from the recent housing developments will be directed into these wetlands.
