= Wendouree Centre for the Performing Arts =

Performing arts center in Wendouree, a suburb of Ballarat, Victoria

- Interactive map of Wendouree Centre for the Performing Arts
- Address: 1220 Howitt Street
- Location: Wendouree, Victoria 3355
- Coordinates: 37.539722°S 143.828889°E
- Seating type: Reserved seating
- Capacity: 857

Construction
- Groundbreaking: 2004
- Built: 2004 - 2006
- Opened: Mid-2006

Website
- wcpa.com.au

The Wendouree Centre for the Performing Arts (WCPA) is a performing arts centre in Wendouree, a suburb of Ballarat, Victoria. The WCPA was completed mid-2006 and replaced the Timkin Hall. It was built at an estimated cost of $8 million. The main auditorium can seat 857 people.
