= Sebastopol, Victoria =

Sebastopol
- Suburb
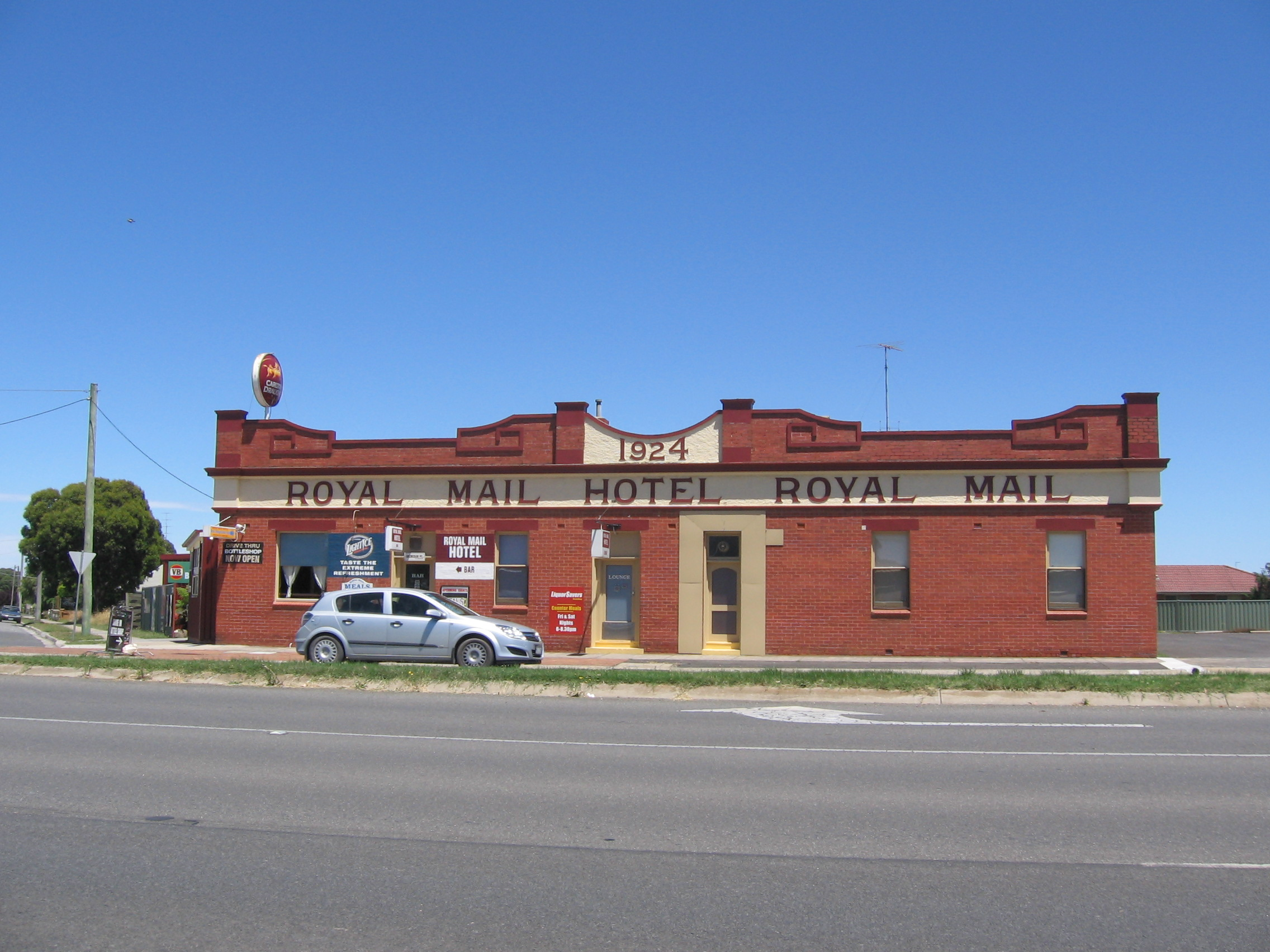
- Royal Mail Hotel

- Interactive map of Sebastopol
- Coordinates: 37°35′7″S 143°50′22″E
- Country: Australia
- State: Victoria
- City: Ballarat
- LGA: City of Ballarat
- Location: 5 km (3.1 mi) from Ballarat Central

Government
  - State electorate: Wendouree
  - Federal division: Ballarat

Area
  - Total: 8.46 km^{2} (3.27 sq mi)

Population
  - Total: 10,194 (2021 census)
  - Density: 1,205.0/km^{2} (3,120.8/sq mi)
- Postcode: 3356
Suburbs around Sebastopol
Redan	Redan	Mount Pleasant
Bonshaw	Sebastopol	Mount Clear
Ross Creek	Cambrian Hill	Magpie

Sebastopol is a southern suburb on the rural-urban fringe of Ballarat, Victoria, Australia. It is the third most populated area in urban Ballarat with a population of 10,194 at the 2021 census.

It is named after Sevastopol in Crimea, the site of an important battle during the Crimean War.

Formerly a separate town, Sebastopol had municipal status between 1864 and 1994 after which the Borough of Sebastopol was merged into the City of Ballarat.

Today it is the site of numerous light-industrial businesses and primarily low cost single-family detached homes and is a fringe suburb in Ballarat and also one of the most car dependent areas in the city.

== History ==
The first inhabitants of the area were the Wathaurong Indigenous Australian tribe.

The land on which Sebastopol now sits was first taken up as a pastoral run called Waverley by Henry Anderson and George Russell in June of 1838. It consisted of 26,000 acres and was stocked with 11,000 sheep. It passed to Jock Winter in 1841 who named it “Bonshaw". In 1855, it was renamed after Sevastopol in Crimea.

Most of Sebastopol is located on a platau on which deep-lead gold mining began in 1854. At its peak as a mining community in the 1850s, Sebastopol had an estimated population of 20,000.

Sebastopol's origin was a separate working class town servicing the rich gold mining fields south of Ballarat.

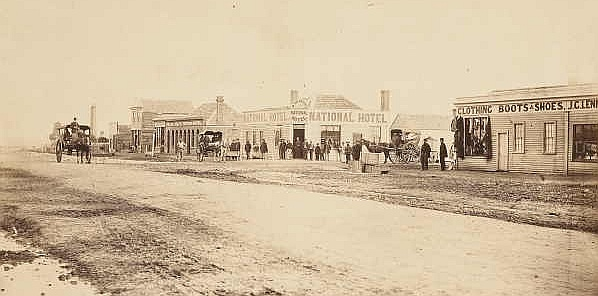
Albert Street, Sebastopol in 1866

The Post Office opened on 5 October 1857.

Sebastopol Town Hall was opened on 19 March 1869.

On 14 August 1913 the tramway to Ballarat opened which led to it becoming by the mid 20th century part of the Ballarat urban area.

== Education ==
Sebastopol is served by a joint primary and secondary school, Phoenix College, several kindergartens, a post office (the post office is now closed) and library, and several small shopping precincts including three supermarkets.

== Transport ==
Buses have operated in Sebastopol since 21 September 1971 after they replaced the tram service. Ballarat Transit now provides regular bus services between Ballarat CBD and Sebastopol.

== Sport ==
Sebastopol has an Australian rules football team competing in the Ballarat Football League. The Sebastopol Vikings play association football/soccer in the Ballarat & District Soccer Association.

For a period of time from 1940 to 1988, the Sebastopol Gift and the Wendouree Gift were the main running events in Ballarat. The Ballarat Gift returned to the Victorian Athletic League's calendar in 1989 after a very long break. An incomplete list of Sebastopol Gift winners is listed below.

Sebastopol Gift Winners
Year	Winner	City (from)	Handicap	Time (secs)
1940	K Clark		yards	
1961	Brian Malee	Casterton	10.75	12.5
1962	John Atkinson		12.25	12.1
1963	Peter Heffernan	Elsternwick		12.2
1964	Billy Goggin	Geelong	10.50	12.6
1965	Peter Lenz			12.3
1966	Peter Heffernan	Elsternwick	11.50	12.2
1970	Terry Harmon		15.25	12.1
1971			metres	
1973	John Keays		12.00	12.2
1976	Leigh Gurney		8.00	12.8
1977	Geoff Lumb			
1981	Ross O'Halloran	Swan Hill	9.00	
1985	C Marks		8.50	12.43

== Notable locals ==
- Erin Carroll, Australian badminton player
- Paul Jenkins, Liberal Party politician
- Percy Trompf, commercial artist
- Bob Wilkie, VFL footballer
