= Newington, Victoria =

Newington Ballarat, Victoria
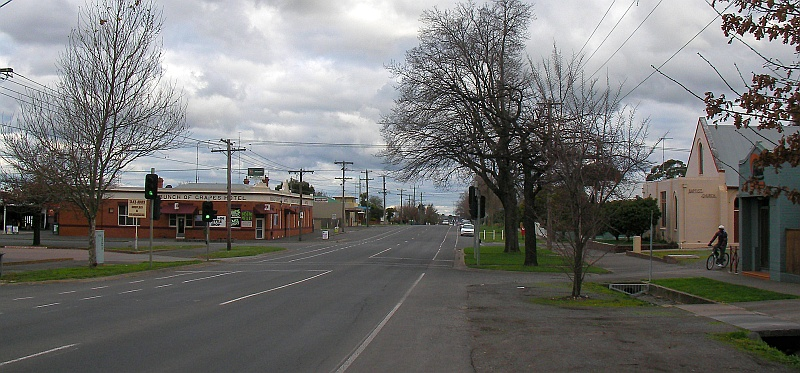
- Pleasant Street commercial area looking south. The Bunch of Grapes Hotel is on the left.

- Coordinates: 37.558°S 143.825°E
- Population: 1,844 (2021 census)
  - Density: 781.4/km^{2} (2,024/sq mi)
- Postcode(s): 3350
- Area: 2.36 km^{2} (0.9 sq mi)
- Location: 2 km (1 mi) from Ballarat Central
- LGA(s): City of Ballarat
- State electorate(s): Wendouree
- Federal division(s): Ballarat
Suburbs around Newington:
Lake Gardens	Lake Wendouree	Lake Wendouree
Alfredton	Newington	Ballarat Central
Delacombe	Delacombe, Redan	Redan

Newington is a suburb south west of Ballarat, Victoria, Australia. The population at the 2021 census was 1,844.

Newington is bordered by Gillies Street to the west, Sturt Street to the north, Pleasant Street to the east and Winter Street to the south.

The Newington Estate Gold Mining Company, a deep lead mining company was established in Ballarat West in 1865. A post office opened in 1865 on the corner of Eyre street, nearby to H.Thomas butcher's shop and cottages. The first residential subdivisions occurred in 1867 with 50 lots released.

Newington is notable for Victoria Park, Ballarat's largest open parkland which features numerous sporting grounds connected by grand avenues of conifers and oaks planted in the 1920s as well as some ornamental wetlands and lakes.

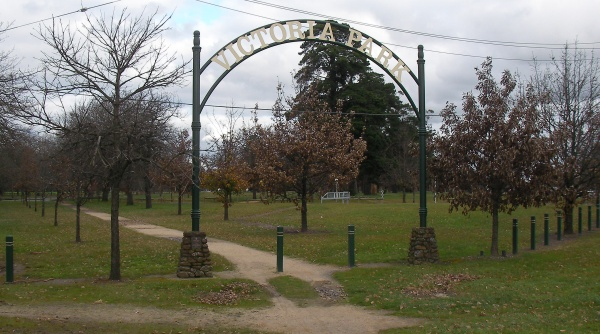
Entrance to Victoria Park at Sturt Street

With the exception of the park and schools, the suburb consists almost solely of Single-family detached homes in grid plan street layout. Many of the homes are either Victorian or interwar styles.
