= Mount Pleasant, Victoria =

Mount Pleasant
- Suburb
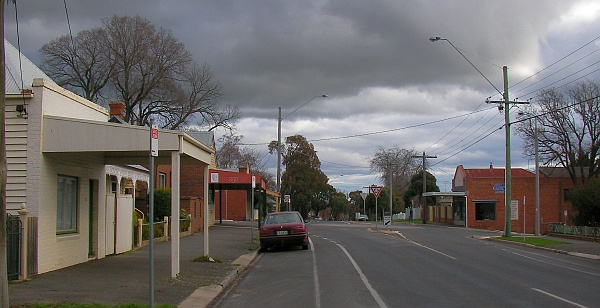
- Barkly Street near the intersection of Cobden Street looking south

- Interactive map of Mount Pleasant
- Coordinates: 37.581°S 143.853°E
- Country: Australia
- State: Victoria
- City: Ballarat
- LGA: City of Ballarat
- Location: 3 km (1.9 mi) from Ballarat Central

Government
  - State electorate: Eureka
  - Federal division: Ballarat

Population
  - Total: 2,225 (2021 census)
- Postcode: 3350
Suburbs around Mount Pleasant
Ballarat Central	Golden Point	Golden Point
Redan	Mount Pleasant	Canadian
Sebastopol	Mount Clear	Mount Clear

Mount Pleasant is the oldest residential suburb of Ballarat, Victoria, Australia. It is located on the southern extremity of the city between the Yarrowee Creek and the White Horse Range. Physically it is largely cut off from the rest of Ballarat which contributes to a sense of a suburb apart. The traditional Wathaurung country was first settled in 1836 when the Yuille brothers established a sheep run that included the sheltered corner under the escarpment later named Mount Pleasant. In those days, before there was a town at Ballarat, Buninyong was the nearest township. When the gold rush of 1851 brought thousands of diggers to nearby Golden Point, Mount Pleasant was left alone as no gold was initially found there. Its peacefulness made it attractive to a number of Cornish miners and their families who had come to Australia to settle permanently. These Wesleyans were the founders of the community. As devout and sober church people they sought a place to live away from the drunken mayhem of the diggings around Main Road.

The converging lines of the main streets that lead into Mount Pleasant from the north (Barkly, Humffray and Bond streets) follow the original tracks that connected it to the Main Road commercial area in the 1850s.

In December 1854, on the gentle slope above the creek, the Cornish families set up their tents and established a school, a memorial to which can be found near the reserve. This quiet life was rudely disrupted in late 1856 when gold was found and for a few years Mount Pleasant itself suffered all the disturbances of a rush. The newer housing development beyond Elsworth Street is where much of the surface mining took place. There were several hotels near where the sewerage pipe now runs, When the alluvial gold ran out, the community settled down and its Methodist character reasserted itself. By the end of the century all the hotels had been closed. From the 1870s a string of Chinese market gardens were established along the creek. Humffray Street and even Morton Street were busy with shops. A very active community developed with sporting teams and cultural activities.

The tent school soon became a well-attended denominational school next to the church. When the colonial government introduced free, compulsory and secular education, the Methodist school closed and in 1874 all 500 pupils marched to the new State School in Cobden Street, the first to be built in Ballarat.

Until the 1970s Mount Pleasant was a largely self-contained community. It was the end of the line. From 1926 until 1972 an electric tram terminated at Bartles Corner (the corner of Barkly and Cobden streets), where there were two general stores, a post office, a butcher, a cake shop and a shoe repairer. Everyone shopped locally.

With the closure of the church and the everyday shops, it is mainly the primary school, which traces its origins back to the beginning of Mount Pleasant as a suburb, which continues as a communal centre.

The suburb is bordered by the Yarrowee River to the west, Gladstone Street to the north, Magpie and Britain Street to the east and Ballarat Goldfields to the south. While Mount Pleasant is organized primarily on a grid plan, the converging lines of some streets indicate their origins as tracks before the streets were made. The housing stock is solid but modest, with many Victorian era Single-family detached homes on larger than average blocks. There is some new industrial activity along Humffray Street below the reserve, where once there were several tanneries and a string of Chinese market gardens. The newer housing estate to the south of Elsworth Street is on the site of the alluvial gold rush of the late 1850s and traces of mining can still be seen.

At the 2021 census, Mount Pleasant had a population of 2,225.

The suburb is served by two regular bus services; the 23 running along Barkly Street and returning to Ballarat railway station and bus terminus and the 21 running from the railway station to Buninyong and return via Sovereign hill and Magpie street.
