= Alfredton, Victoria =

Alfredton
- Suburb
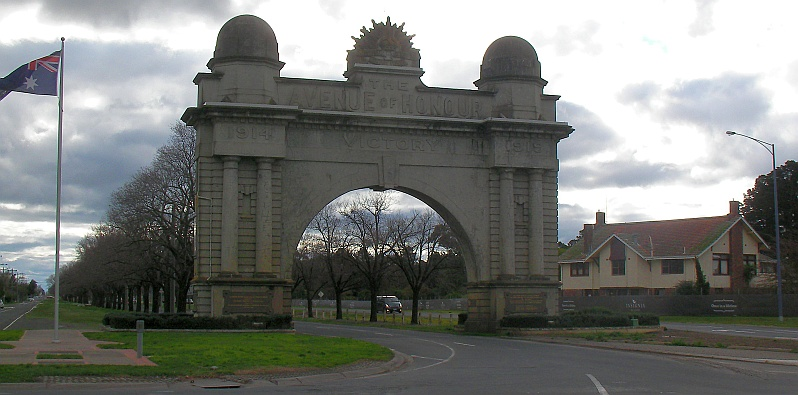
- Victory Arch at the entrance to the Avenue of Honour, Ballarat

- Interactive map of Alfredton
- Coordinates: 37.555°S 143.800°E
- Country: Australia
- State: Victoria
- City: Ballarat
- LGA: City of Ballarat
- Location: 4 km (2.5 mi) from Ballarat Central

Government
  - State electorate: Wendouree
  - Federal division: Ballarat

Area
  - Total: 7.6 km^{2} (2.9 sq mi)

Population
  - Total: 11,822 (2021 census)
  - Density: 1,556/km^{2} (4,029/sq mi)
- Postcode: 3350
Suburbs around Alfredton
| Cardigan | Lake Gardens | Lake Wendouree |
| Lucas | Alfredton | Newington |
| Delacombe | Delacombe | Delacombe |

Alfredton is a suburb of Ballarat, Victoria, Australia, west of the CBD. The population at the 2021 census was 11,822, making it the most populous suburb in Ballarat's urban area.

Alfredton is located west of Lake Wendouree along Sturt Street. The suburb has some of Ballarat's best known landmarks, including the Arch of Victory and a World War I memorial which once marked the entrance to Ballarat and the start of Ballarat's Avenue of Honour. The Avenue of Honour is the longest war memorial roadside plantation in Australia, which extends 18 km to the Western Freeway.

Originally part of Cardigan and known by that name, the present area was named in honour of Prince Alfred, Duke of Edinburgh following his visit to Ballarat in 1867.

The artists and illustrators Ambrose and Will Dyson were born and lived in Alfredton as did their brother the journalist Edward Dyson.

The Alfredton area is central to Western Ballarat's growth corridor, an area where suburban development is encouraged by the City of Ballarat and State Government of Victoria. Most of urban Ballarat's subdivision for new housing estates is happening in greenfield land to the south, north and west of the Avenue of Honour. Large estates include Balymanus, Alfredton Central, The Chase and Insignia.

== History ==
The Post Office opened on 1 August 1868. However, there is currently no Post Office in Alfredton and the Alfredton PO Boxes were relocated to the neighbouring suburb of Lucas.

Originally part of Cardigan and known by that name, the present area was named in honour of Prince Alfred, Duke of Edinburgh following the royal visit to Ballarat in 1867.

== Urban form and housing ==
While a small section of the original township and main roads are grid plan, the majority of Alfredton's residential areas have been developed under the concepts of street hierarchy with looped streets and culs-de-sac and almost all single-family detached homes. As a result, while the suburban streets are quiet the main roads around Alfredton are particularly busy.

== Transport ==
The main form of transport in Alfredton is the private motor car and Alfredton can be classed as a car dependent suburb.

Effort has been made by the Ballarat City Council over the years to provide a network of bicycle lanes on major roads, to encourage the use of bicycles; and to increase the safety of bicyclists.

There are two different urban bus services servicing the suburb, both of which run regularly to the city. Route 10 is from Ballarat Station to Alfredton via Howitt Street and loops around Robertson Drive via Dyson Drive and Cuthberts Road. Route 26 is Ballarat Station to Alfredton via Sturt Street and Cuthberts Road. The suburb is serviced by Ballarat Taxis, a co-operative taxi network.

The former Redan Junction railway line servicing the Ballarat Saleyards and the Redan industrial precinct previously bisected the suburb, but this line was closed in 1997. The line has since been completely lifted, though the reservation remains unoccupied, and is generally now used as a walking trail.

The nearest railway station is Wendouree 3 km to the north.

== Parks and open space ==
Golfers play at the course of the Ballarat Golf Club on Sturt Street in the suburb. A network of walking and cycling tracks begin at the R.J. Cameron Reserve (bordered by Learmonth Street to the east and Portsea Street to the south), and extends west, crossing the aforementioned Redan Junction railway line, through the Alfredton Recreational Reserve, and on until Dyson Drive in Lucas.

More parks, playgrounds, and open spaces are being developed in some of the newer housing estates that are currently in different stages of being built (as of 2020).
