= September 2010 Victoria floods =

2010 series of floods in Victoria, Australia

The 2010 Victorian floods were a widespread series of flood events across the state of Victoria, Australia. The floods, which followed heavy rain across southeastern Australia in early September 2010, caused the inundation of about 250 homes, hundreds of evacuations and millions of dollars of damage. Weather warnings were initially issued for Victoria on Thursday 2 September and rain began to fall on the Friday, continuing through the weekend to Tuesday. Heavy rain fell in most regions of the state, particularly at higher altitudes in the state's west and northeast, flooding the upper reaches of many of Victoria's major rivers. A state of emergency was declared with State Emergency Service crews arriving from Queensland, South Australia and Tasmania. The floods proceeded an extensive drought period that had effected the entirety of Australia.

While the flooding was widespread, swelling many major rivers, little flash flooding occurred in urban areas. Melbourne remained relatively unaffected, though several large regional towns, such as Ballarat, Benalla and others, experienced urban flooding.

The heavy rainfall and flooding was accompanied by wind gusts of up to 110 km/h (68 mph) in the state's southeast and Melbourne's eastern suburbs. The highest rainfall was recorded at Mount Buffalo, with 180 mm (7.08 in) recorded between Saturday and Sunday (4 and 5 September). Authorities expected floodwaters to move downstream, affecting further towns and regions over the following days. Residents in affected areas were advised to boil their water and avoid driving or travelling through floodwaters.

== Lead up ==
Victoria had been in severe drought since the late 1990s and had been progressively receiving increased rainfall since the late 2000s, but by mid-2010, the state received some of its highest rainfall recorded since the late 1990s.

Severe storms moved over southeast South Australia on Thursday/Friday (2 and 3 September) bringing heavy rain and cutting electricity to around 40,000 homes. These storms moved over western Victoria by Friday night and continued in a roughly easterly direction throughout that weekend, bringing heavy rain to much of Victoria.

=== Future flooding ===
The State Emergency Service and Bureau of Meteorology anticipated that floodwaters flowing downstream would eventually cause widespread flooding in the Murray River for several weeks.

== Timeline ==
- September:
- 2 – Thursday – severe storms move over South Australia bringing heavy rainfall
- 3 – Friday – heavy rain crosses the border into Victoria.
  - afternoon – heavy rains start falling in Victoria's western regions.
  - night – heavy rains fall in Victoria's central region and Melbourne.
- 4 – Saturday – heavy rain falls in the state's north and northeast.
  - night – floodwaters move through many towns in the state's northeast.
- 5 – Sunday – heavy rain falls in the Gippsland region.
- 6 – Monday – rainfall eases off across the state but floodwaters are expected to move downstream.
- 7 – Tuesday – floodwaters arrive in Shepparton and other towns, Bairnsdale not impacted as heavily as first thought.

== Rainfall ==
- 180 mm between Saturday and Sunday 4 and 5 – Mount Buffalo
- 71 mm before 7 pm Friday 3 – Leigh Creek, east of Ballarat
- 47 mm before 9 am Saturday 4 – Ballarat

== Towns affected ==
In Skipton in the states Western District, 20 properties were put on evacuation alert, while in the Central Highlands 120 people sought refuge in the town hall at Creswick and 30 people were evacuated from a caravan park in Clunes. In northern Victoria, 150 extra police and 50 defence personnel were deployed to assist with evacuations and sandbagging.

Many towns located on major watercourses experienced riverine flooding from Friday 3 onwards. The following towns were most affected, the day floodwaters peaked and when flash flooding occurred is indicated:

- Bairnsdale – peaked?
- Ballarat – flash flooding Friday night
- Benalla – peaked Saturday – 70 properties evacuated
- Bendigo – peaked Saturday morning
- Bright – peaked Friday/Saturday? – was temporarily cut off
- Charlton – peaked late on Sunday 5th
- Clunes – peaked Friday/Saturday? – 30 people were evacuated from a caravan park
- Creswick – peaked Saturday morning/afternoon
- Donald – peaked Tuesday/Wednesday?
- Euroa – peaked Saturday
- Glenorchy – peaked?
- Horsham – peaked Tuesday/Wednesday?
- Maryborough – peaked?
- Myrtleford – peaked Saturday?
- Shepparton – peaked Tuesday 7th
- Skipton – peaked Friday/Saturday – 20 properties evacuated
- Violet Town – peaked Saturday?
- Wangaratta – peaked Tuesday 7th – 60 houses evacuated

=== Evacuations ===
Around 250 houses were evacuated from Saturday to Sunday. Weather warnings were given well in advance enabling residents and businesses to sandbag and evacuate before floodwaters arrived. The SES and other authorities have been doorknocking in many towns to notify residents most at risk of the need to evacuate. 500 homes in Shepparton were doorknocked and given warnings as a flood peak was expected in the early morning hours of 8 September.

== Utilities affected ==
- Radio – Residents of Ballarat could not receive certain radio frequencies on Friday night and into the weekend.
- Communications – some areas have had troubles with their telecommunications networks.

== Road closures ==
Sections of the following major highways were inundated during the floods:

- Calder Highway – at Charlton
- Midland Highway – between Benalla and Shepparton

== Rivers flooded ==
At peak, around 35 Victorian rivers experienced both fast and slow riverine flooding. As of Tuesday 7 September much of these floodwaters are still flowing downstream:

- Avoca River
- Broken River
- Castles Creek
- Creswick/Tullaroop Creeks
- Goulburn River – Lake Eildon is now more than half full for the first time in 9 years.
- Honeysuckle Creek
- Kiewa River
- King River/One Mile Creek – water levels rose at half a metre per hour
- Loddon River
- Macalister River
- Mitchell River – expected to peak at 8 metres late on Monday 6th
- Ovens River – water levels rose at half a metre per hour
- Seven Creeks
- Wimmera River
- Yarra River – at Yarra Glen

== Landslides ==
There were a number of small landslides in the Victorian Alps, one forced the closure of the Mount Hotham ski resort after a ticket office was destroyed, injuring a staff member, whilst another one cut off the road to Falls Creek. Landslides also affected a car park at the Mount Buller ski resort, leaving hundreds of skiers stranded.

== Benefits ==
The floods have provided some benefits. Water prices are expected to drop dramatically. Many areas affected have been suffering from drought and farmers especially appreciated an end to the dry conditions. The waters are expected to naturally flush out the mouth of the Murray River, an event which hasn't occurred for nearly a decade.

== See also ==
- Floods in Australia
- Extreme weather events in Melbourne
- 2011 Victorian floods
- 2022 south eastern Australia floods
