= Bridgewater On Loddon, Victoria =

Bridgewater On Loddon
- Town
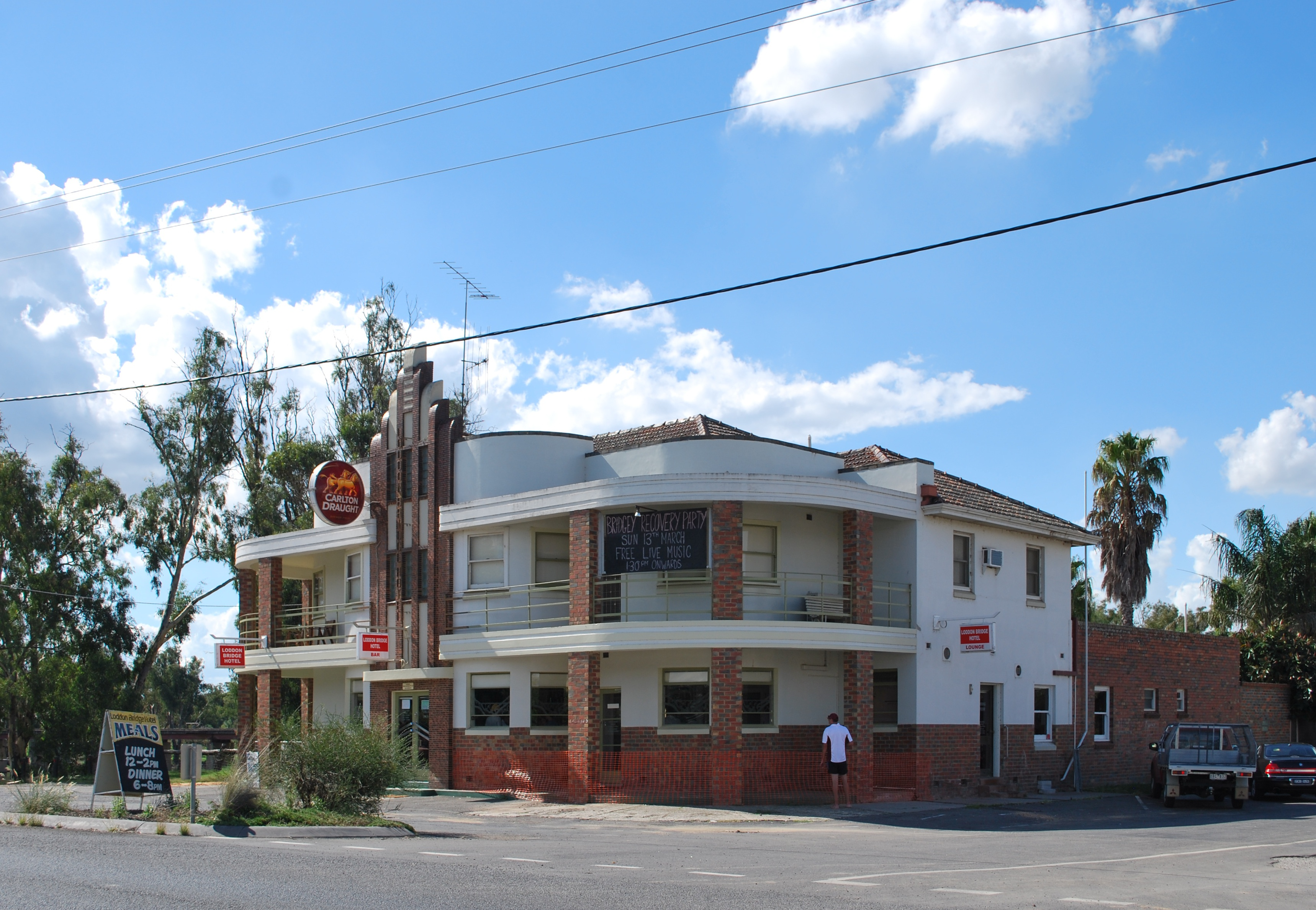
- The Loddon Bridge Hotel

- Coordinates: 36°36′0″S 143°57′0″E
- Country: Australia
- State: Victoria
- LGA: Shire of Loddon
- Location: 180 km (110 mi) from Melbourne; 35 km (22 mi) from Bendigo; 7 km (4.3 mi) from Inglewood

Government
  - State electorate: Ripon
  - Federal division: Mallee

Population
  - Total: 341 (SAL 2021)
- Postcode: 3516

Bridgewater On Loddon is a town in north central Victoria, Australia. The town is located on the Calder Highway, north-west of Bendigo, astride the Loddon River. At the 2021 census, Bridgewater On Loddon had a population of 341. The town is completely surrounded by the locality of Bridgewater.

== History ==
The Post Office opened on 1 January 1868 as Bridgewater-on-Loddon and was renamed Bridgewater around 1941. The railway serving Bridgewater was opened from Eaglehawk in 1876. The station closed in 2007.

In 2008, Bridgewater Primary School had around 32 students; four years earlier the enrolment had been 70. In 2017, the number of students had dropped to 23, due to parents working in Bendigo.

In 2018 and 2019 the Bridgewater Bakehouse was awarded first place for Australia's best vanilla slice.

== Sports ==
The Mill Rapid, located downstream of the Calder Highway bridge, is a section of the Loddon River that features Grade 3 whitewater suitable for kayaking.

The town has an Australian Rules football team competing in the Loddon Valley Football League.

Golfers play at the Bridgewater-On-Loddon Golf Club on the Calder Highway.
