= Wendouree =

- Suburb
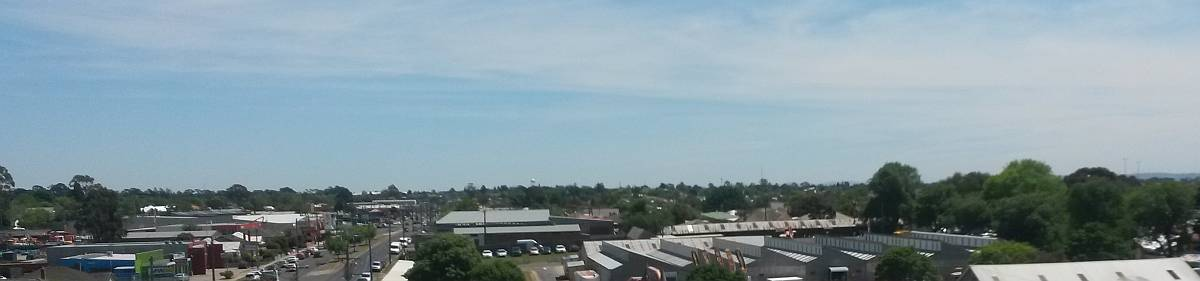
- View west over Howitt Street from the exhibition grounds.

- Interactive map of Wendouree
- Coordinates: 37.532°S 143.823°E
- Country: Australia
- State: Victoria
- City: Ballarat
- LGA: City of Ballarat
- Location: 5 km (3.1 mi) NW of Ballarat Central

Government
  - State electorate: Wendouree
  - Federal division: Ballarat

Area
  - Total: 9.72 km^{2} (3.75 sq mi)

Population
  - Total: 10,376 (2021 census)
  - Density: 1,067.5/km^{2} (2,764.8/sq mi)
- Postcode: 3355
Suburbs around Wendouree
Miners Rest	Mount Rowan	Invermay Park
Mitchell Park	Wendouree	Ballarat North
Lake Gardens	Lake Wendouree	Soldiers Hill

Wendouree (/ˌwɛndəˈriː/) is a large suburb on the north western rural-urban fringe of the city of Ballarat, in Victoria, Australia. It is the second most populated suburb in the City of Ballarat with a total of 10,376 inhabitants at the 2021 census.

It is named after nearby Lake Wendouree, which derives its name from the Wathaurong word wendaaree, meaning "be off" (or "go away"). It incorporates the unofficial locality of Wendouree West.

Wendouree has the second major commercial and business hub in Greater Ballarat, and is also the location of several Ballarat-based commercial and industrial firms.

Landmarks of Wendouree include the Ballarat Sports and Events Centre, the home of the Ballarat Miners and Ballarat Rush; the Ballarat Showgrounds (Venue for the annual Ballarat Show); Eureka Stadium (Home ground of the North Ballarat (Australian Football) club and Australian Football League venue), the former St Mary's Redemptorist Monastery, Stockland Wendouree Shopping Complex, and the Wendouree Centre for the Performing Arts.

== History ==
In 1838 a squatter called William Cross Yuille camped on the shores of the Black Swamp, now known as Lake Wendouree, the first Ballarat resident. The Yuille Pastoral Run developed during the mid-1800s.

Renowned fly fishing author Alfred Ronalds established Ballarat's first garden nursery in 1854 on the bank of the Swamp. He also built large tanks there and provided water for the town.

Wendouree Post Office opened on 17 February 1871.

Significant urban growth in Wendouree began shortly after the Second World War, encouraged by the development of industrial areas to the west.

The Howitt Street shopping centre opened in 1962, and Wendouree Village shopping centre (now Stockland) opened in 1978.

The landmark St Mary's Redemptorist Monastery in Gillies Street was converted into apartments beginning in 2000.

== Commerce and Industry ==
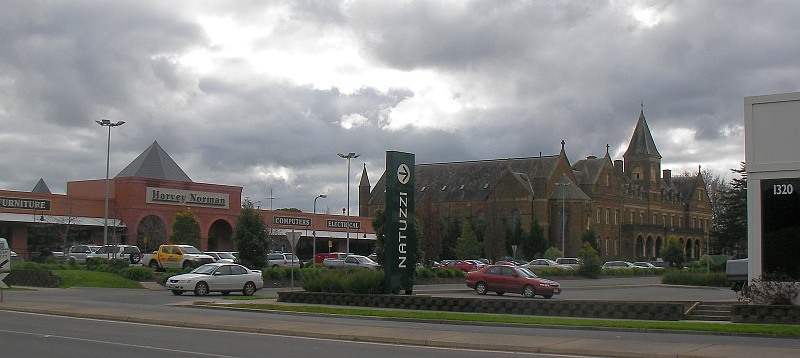
Howitt Street and the former St Mary's Redemptorist Monastery. Harvey Norman is on the left.

Wendouree's main commercial area is along the western section of Howitt Street between Forest and Gillies Streets, and along Gillies Street between Howitt and Norman Streets. Located in this area are the Howitt Street Shopping Centre, the Wendouree Homemaker Centre and Stockland Wendouree, as well as fast-food restaurants, car dealerships, community and health-care facilities and a number of small office buildings.

Newer industrial and commercial estates have recently commenced development on designated future growth zones to the West that will benefit from access to Ballarat's new western bypass road and planned redevelopment and expansion of the city's airport.

== Education ==
Wendouree is home to Ballarat Grammar School in Forest Street and the Mount Rowan Secondary College. The suburb also has four primary schools (Wendouree, Forest Street, Our Lady Help of Christians Parish, and Yuille Park Community College).

Ballarat Grammar is an independent Kindergarten to Year 12 school affiliated with the Anglican Church of Australia. It was opened by Bishop Green on the current site at the corner of Howitt and Forest Streets in 1911 as a school only for boys. In 1973 the school amalgamated with the Queens Grammar School for girls in Ballarat Central, with the girls making the move to the larger Wendouree campus.

Mount Rowan Secondary College (located at the corner of Forest Street and Giot Drive) is located at the northern end of the suburb opened in 1978 as the Wendouree High Technical School. Its name changed to Wendouree Secondary College in 1990. In 1993 the school was amalgamated with Ballarat East Secondary College (originally High School) and Midlands Secondary College (originally Ballarat North Technical School) to form Ballarat Secondary College. The new campus, like that of the others, catered for years 7 to 10. Years 11 and 12 were accommodated at the Barkly Street, Ballarat Central, campus opened in 2000. It replaced the Midlands campus, which was subsequently closed and demolished. In 2017, the college was re-instated as a separate college again catering for years P7-12.

Wendouree Primary School (PS 1813) is located on Howitt Street opposite the Howitt Street shopping centre.

Forest Street Primary School (PS 4936) is located at the northern end of Forest Street near the secondary college. It opened in February 1966.

Our Lady Help of Christians Parish Primary School is located on Gillies Street in the suburb's north-west. It was opened on 15 October 1961, with the foundation staff of Srs. Anne Gardan, Antoinette Russo, Paulinus Setford and Austin Connellan.

Wendouree West Primary School (State School No 4701) opened in 1957. The Victorian Government Gazette 815 dated 26 September 1956 records the first Primary School originally being constructed as a six classroom, concrete veneer, timber-framed building that cost 21,300 pounds to construct. The builder was the local Ballarat building firm A. V. Jennings Constructions. In 1972 the school was given a State award for having the best maintained school grounds in Victoria, with extensive plantings of flower beds and native trees. In 1975 a library, art room and multi-function hall complex was built at the expense of the removal of many of the best native flower and rose beds. In 1977 the primary school population peaked at 437 children. This number decreased significantly with the establishment of the temporary Yuille Primary School to the north in 1981. Wendouree West Primary was renamed Grevillea Park in the early 1990s.

Yuille Park Community College (PS 5520), located on Violet Grove in the west of the suburb, opened in brand new buildings in 2007 as the merger of Yuille Primary School and Grevillea Park Primary School. The Yuille Primary School buildings in McKenzie Drive are now used for running alternative education programs for disinterested students.

== Healthcare and Community Services ==
Within Wendouree are a number of significant healthcare facilities. These include the Queen Elizabeth Village, an aged care complex next to Stockland Wendouree, in Gillies Street. It is a publicly owned service and part of the larger Queen Elizabeth Centres of the Ballarat Health Services. In Howitt Street near Wendouree Primary School is the Kelaston aged care centre and the Vision Australia Centre. Another facility, Mulvra Aged Care, is a privately run centre in Dowling Street, opposite the Wendouree Sports Complex.

Along both Howitt and Gillies Streets are many medical practices, some offering specialist services, such as podiatry, paediatrics, pathology, and medical imagery. The Ballarat Day Procedure Centre is in Howitt Street near the intersection with Forest Street.

Wendouree Veterinary Practice is also in Howitt Street.

Child care and pre-school centres in Wendouree are located in College Street; Forest Street, near the Forest Street Primary School; Dare Street, as part of Ballarat Grammar School; Howitt Street, opposite the Day Procedure Centre; Gillies Street, opposite Weeramar Park; Norman Street, next to Weeramar Park; and Hazel Road.

Adjoining Yuille Park College is the Wendouree West Community House, a neighbourhood centre offering social opportunities, adult education courses, and programs specifically designed for children, for youth, for men and for women. The Wendouree Community Health Centre, located near the corner of Learmonth Road and Gillies Street, provides health information and counselling, as well as space for hire for local groups and events.

== Transport ==
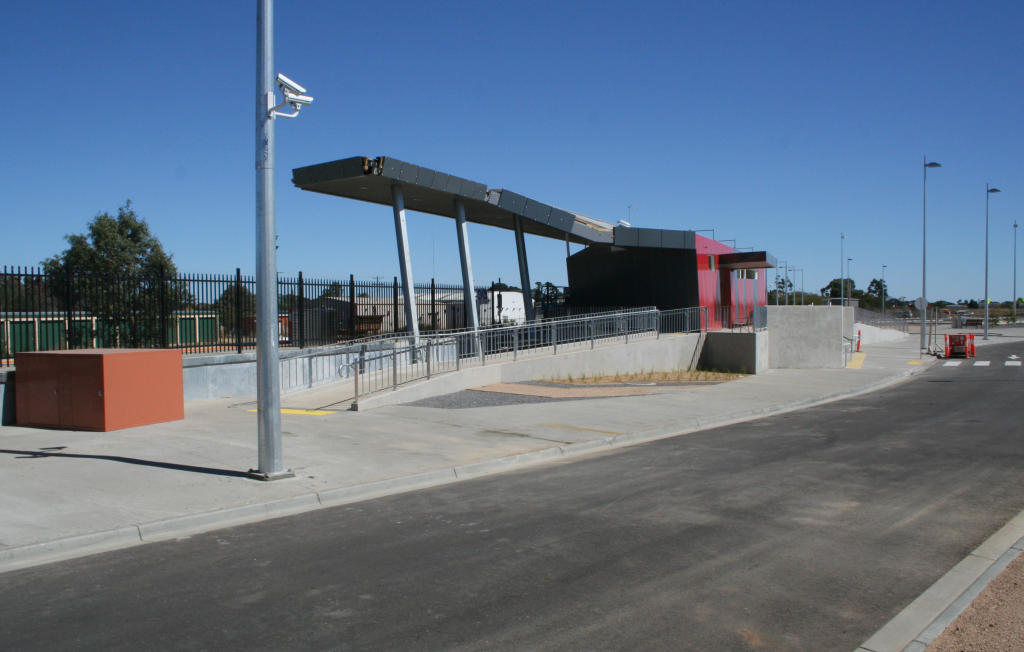
Wendouree Railway Station

Wendouree is serviced by several bus routes: Route 11 terminates at Wendouree Station. Ballarat Station to Wendouree Station via Drummond Street. Route 12 terminates at Wendouree Station. Ballarat Station to Wendouree Station via Midland Highway and Dowling Street. Route 31 terminates at Wendouree Station. Wendouree Station to Miners Rest via Learmonth Road. Route 10 stops at Wendouree Station. Ballarat Station to Alfredton via Wendouree and Midland Highway, Forest Street and Gillies Street. Ballarat Taxis operates in Wendouree and throughout Ballarat and offers the only night transport in Wendouree excluding Night Trains and Coaches. Wendouree railway station, opened in 2009, is located on the south-western edge of the suburb, just off Learmonth Road. The station runs V/Line trains along the Ballarat line.

== Sports Facilities ==
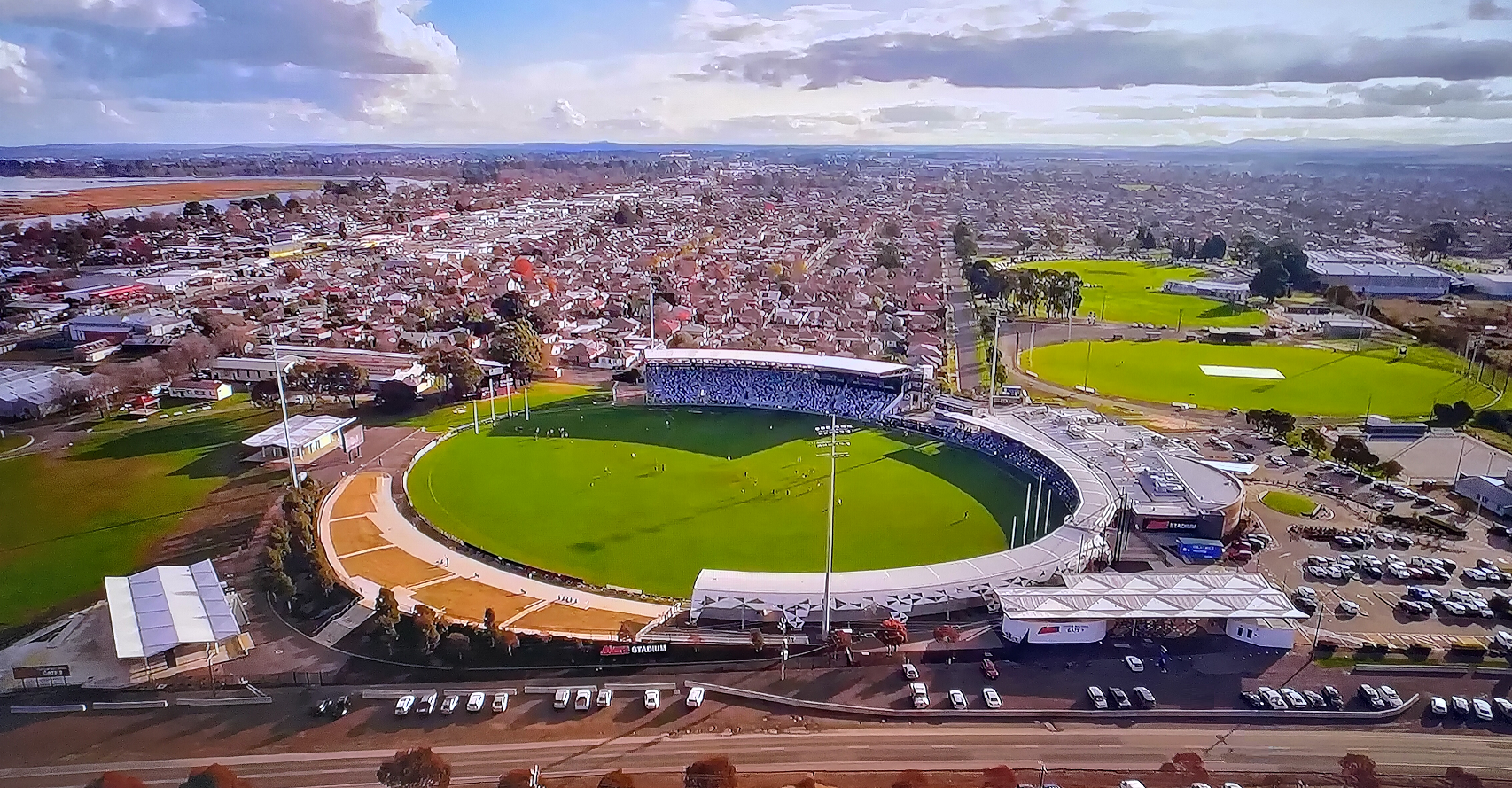
Eureka (Mars) Stadium and Eureka Sports Precinct

Wendouree has a significant range of premier sporting facilities catering to seasonal and year-round competitions. Indoor and outdoor basketball, badminton, tennis and lawn bowls facilities at Hollioake Park in the North of Wendouree.

The Eureka sports precinct in the south-east comprises the Ballarat Agricultural and Pastoral Society Showgrounds, Eureka Stadium, North Ballarat No 2 oval, the Wendouree Football Oval (C. E. Brown Reserve), outdoor netball courts and the Ballarat Sports and Events Centre. The latter is the home of Basketball and Netball in Ballarat.

Other sports facilities include the Wendouree West Recreation Reserve off Holly Grove, which has two competition grade soccer fields and a BMX track; the large Ring Road reserve; and a number of small reserves within residential areas.

There was once a Wendouree Gift sprint race over 130 yards at the Wendouree Sports Ground, which was run in the 1950's.

Wendouree Gift Winners
Year	Winner	City (from)	Handicap	Time (secs)
1950	Albert Grant	England	3.75	11.6
1951	L T Atkinson	Daylesford	8.00	12.0
1952	Norm McDonald	Essendon	5.00	12.3
1953	Tom Brudenell	Ballarat	6.75	12.1
1954	Reg H Schleiger	Bendigo	10.0	11.9
1955	Max Dolman	Coleraine	9.00	11.7
1956	Alan Caldwell	Daylesford	9.00	12.0
1957	Ron H C Smith	Port Fairy	8.00	12.0
1958	K N W Lawry		13.50	12.2

== Neighbourhoods ==
=== Wendouree West ===
The Ballarat West Estate, later renamed as Wendouree West, was first planned in 1949 as a large public housing scheme of the Housing Commission of Victoria, to deal with the post-war housing shortage. Demand was also anticipated with the increasing 'baby boom' and intake of post-war immigrants. The estate originally consisted of 750 prefabricated timber bungalows that were mostly built between 1952 and 1962. Initially many of its residents worked in nearby manufacturing plants producing building laminate, caravans and roller bearings.

Wendouree West Post Office opened in February 1955. The post office was relocated to Wendouree Village Shopping Centre (now Stockland) in 1992.

Early plans envisaged the estate to be an urban planning model, however development of infrastructure was considerably slower than the construction of housing, with many homes not being connected to sewerage or served by sealed roads until the late 1950s. During the 1950s an aggressive and active community development committee was established, and elements of this committee still remain today, promoting the ongoing development of the neighbourhood. In the mid-1950s a small shopping centre, playgrounds, a kindergarten and other amenities were built. During the 1970s a further 500, more substantial modern brick veneer homes were built to the north of the estate. By the late 1970s the population of the suburb peaked at approximately 5,000.

Today, the estate has a resident population representing a mixture of cultures and age groups. The estate is noted as having low socio-economic resources due to higher-than-average unemployment, a high population of aged residents, and inter-generational social welfare dependency.

Attempts over the years to change the name of Wendouree West were met with mixed responses from residents throughout Ballarat. In the early 2000s, during a process to make official the boundaries of all cities, towns and suburbs in Victoria, it was determined that Wendouree West would exist only as an unofficial neighbourhood name. The name Wendouree West (or "Westie") was often used to stigmatise and as a term of derision, often placing its residents at a disadvantage when applying for employment and other positions in the wider Ballarat community. In large part, this historic stigmatisation has contributed to the ongoing disadvantage of its youths. The estate today is now included as part of Wendouree.

In recent years attempts have been made to rejuvenate the estate including the removal of many of the early prefabricated cottages and the construction of retirement units and modern private and public housing. Some 300 of the original houses are to be retained and many have already undergone extensive renovation and modernisation, but in such a way that the historical character of the area remains intact. The original Wendouree West State School buildings were demolished in early 2007, with the new replacement school opening as Yuille Park Community College, the product of amalgamation with Yuille Primary School. The renewal program has also seen a lot of civic improvements including street-scaping, an upgrade of the shopping centre, new footpaths and fences, as well as new play equipment, toilets and barbecue facilities in the parks.
