= Lake Wendouree, Victoria =

Lake Wendouree
- Suburb
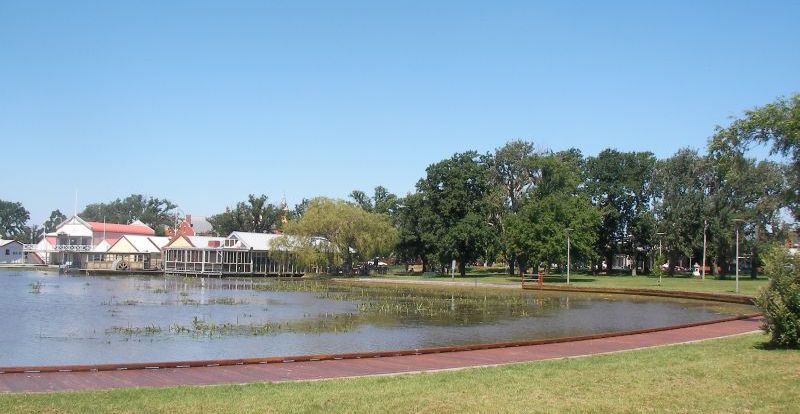
- Lake Wendouree from View Point. On the left are the boat sheds of the Ballarat City, Ballarat & Clarendon College, Canoe Club, Golden City Steamer and Boat Shed cafe restaurant; Middle is the Lakeview Hotel

- Interactive map of Lake Wendouree
- Coordinates: 37.549°S 143.847°E
- Country: Australia
- State: Victoria
- City: Ballarat
- LGA: City of Ballarat
- Location: 2 km (1.2 mi) from Ballarat Central

Government
  - State electorate: Wendouree
  - Federal division: Ballarat

Area
  - Total: 4.7 km^{2} (1.8 sq mi)

Population
  - Total: 2,878 (2021 census)
  - Density: 612/km^{2} (1,586/sq mi)
- Postcode: 3350
Suburbs around Lake Wendouree
| Wendouree | Ballarat Central | Ballarat Central |
| Lake Gardens | Lake Wendouree | Ballarat Central |
| Newington | Ballarat Central | Ballarat Central |

Lake Wendouree is a suburb of Ballarat, Victoria, Australia located immediately west of the Ballarat central business district. It encompasses the man-made recreational lake Lake Wendouree, after which it is named. At the 2021 census, Lake Wendouree had a population of 2,878.

Lake Wendouree is home to many of the city's wealthiest residents and much of its old money. It has the highest median value in the Ballarat urban area ($610,000). The suburb also holds the record for the highest declared price for a (non-subdivision) residential property sale in Ballarat - $1.5 million and has highest percentage of home ownership in Ballarat.

Lake Wendouree is bordered by the Ballarat railway line to the north, Drummond Street North and Lexton Street to the east, Mair and Sturt Streets to the south, and Gillies Street to the west.

== History ==
The area was established in the 1870s. As the lake became a recreational landmark during the land boom of the Victorian era, which followed the Victorian gold rush days, the area became popular with the city's wealthy. Led by the bluestone gothic Bishop's palace (1876) and later the entrepreneur William Bailey (1883), many large mansions and impressive homes were established in the area close to the lake.

The Electric Supply Company of Victoria built a bluestone power station at the corner of Ripon Street and Wendouree Parade in 1901 to replace Ballarat's horse-drawn tramways with a new electric system.

Despite the decline in Ballarat's wealth, the march of large expensive homes toward the shores of the lake continued well into the 1920s.

The State Electricity Commission took over operation of the power station and for many decades it served as much of the surrounding residential area's electricity supply until 1942. The power station was sold and demolished in the mid 1990s and replaced with a row of houses.

== Prestigious address ==
Lake Wendouree is a suburb with a high proportion of large homes and mansions exploiting the views and proximity to the lake. Tree-lined Webster Street, in particular, is frequently proclaimed by estate agents to be Ballarat's most prestigious and most expensive address and properties in nearby streets will often be advertised based on their proximity to Webster Street in order to boost their sales value.

== Parks and open space ==
Parks surround the lake at Lake Wendouree have many recreational facilities including boats and rowing sheds. The most prominent park is the Ballarat Botanical Gardens at the west end of the suburb.

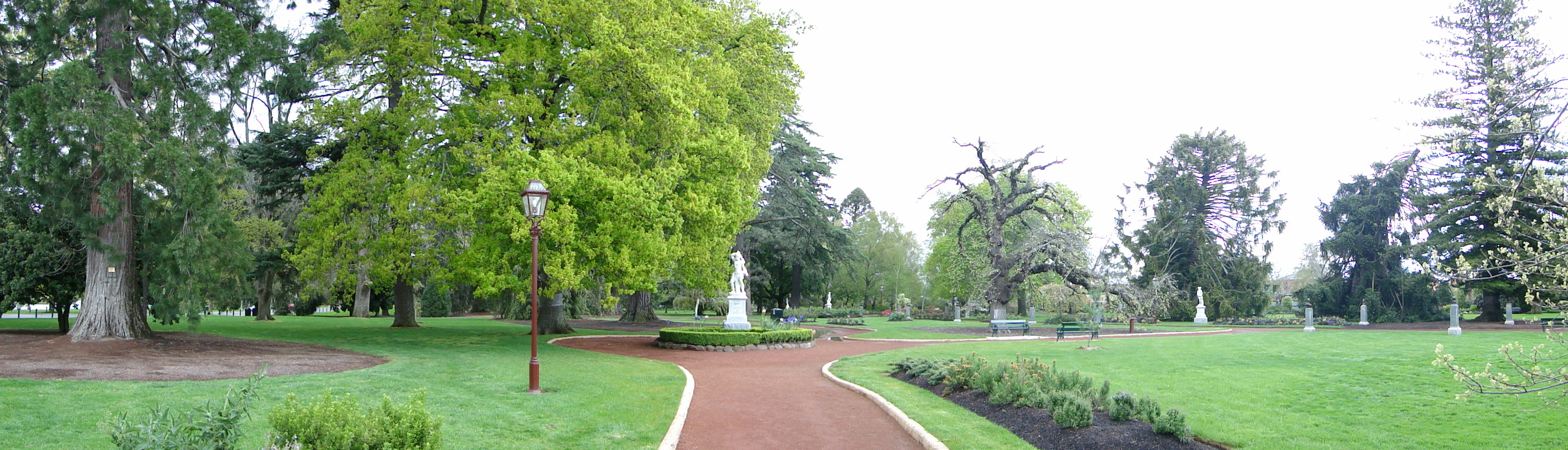
Ballarat Botanical Gardens

== Sport ==
The City Oval precinct is in Lake Wendouree. It is one of Ballarat's largest and oldest stadiums and hosts both Australian rules football, cricket and a nearby bowling club. North of the lake on Gregory Street is the Central Wendouree bowling club.

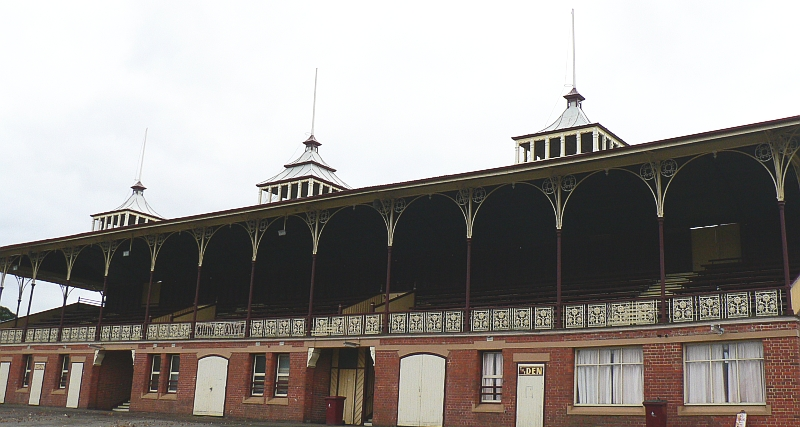
The grandstand at City Oval Sturt Street, Lake Wendouree was built in 1887

== Health ==
St John of God Hospital complex is located in Lake Wendouree.

== Schools ==
Lake Wendouree has a number of schools including the Ballarat campus of the Australian Catholic University, Loreto College, and the Pleasant Street Primary School.

== Places of worship ==
A prominent building in Lake Wendouree is the Nazareth House convent complex.

== Hotels ==
There are a number of trendy hotels and cafes near the lake, including the fashionable Lake View hotel (established 1875) and "The Boatshed".
