= Redan, Victoria =

Suburb of Ballarat, Victoria, Australia

Redan
- Suburb
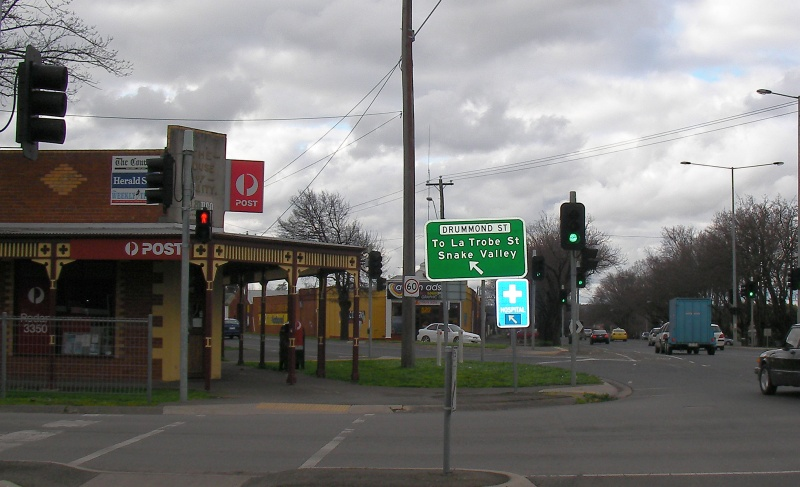
- Post office and commercial area on the junction of Skipton, Drummond and Darling Streets Redan

- Interactive map of Redan
- Coordinates: 37.577°S 143.844°E
- Country: Australia
- State: Victoria
- City: Ballarat
- LGA: City of Ballarat
- Location: 3 km (1.9 mi) from Ballarat Central

Government
  - State electorate: Wendouree
  - Federal division: Ballarat

Area
  - Total: 2.23 km^{2} (0.86 sq mi)

Population
  - Total: 3,000 (2021 census)
  - Density: 1,350/km^{2} (3,500/sq mi)
- Postcode: 3350
Suburbs around Redan
Newington	Newington, Ballarat Central	Ballarat Central, Golden Point
Delacombe	Redan	Mount Pleasant
Delacombe	Sebastopol	Mount Pleasant

Redan is an inner suburb of Ballarat, Victoria, Australia immediately south of Ballarat Central. The population at the 2021 census was 3,000.

Its boundaries along Winter Street East, Pleasant Street, Sebastopol Street and Hill Street, on the north side; Yarrowee River forms the eastern boundary; Rubicon Street is the southern edge with Sutton Street forming the west side. Pleasant Street is the main road through the suburb and commercial area.

It was named for the fortifications used during the battle at Sevastopol during the Crimean War.

== History ==
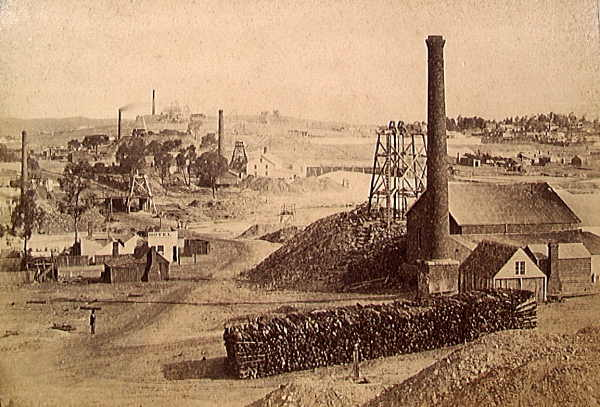
Redan in 1875

Redan was one of Ballarat's first deep lead gold mining areas on the outskirts of Ballarat between the city and the town of Sebastopol. In the 1870s and 1880s, the Redan lead had a number of larger gold mining companies extracting Sergeants Freehold Quartz Goldmining Company and the Hustler's Line of Reef.

The suburb developed gradually with working class origins, the home of many miners.

A Post Office was first opened here on 1 July 1935.

== Layout, housing and growth ==
Redan is almost entirely laid out in grid plan. The population was forecast to increase to 3195 in 2021 with 1536 dwellings.

As of September 2009, Redan had the most affordable houses in Australia. The population has many people in their teens and early twenties in low cost rental accommodation. At that time the median house price in Redan was $190,000.

== Sport ==
Redan has an Australian rules football team-the Redan Lions-playing in the Ballarat Football League.

Redan also has a soccer club Ballarat City FC competing in the National Premier League which is the third tier of Australian soccer behind the national A-League. Since 2014 their home ground is Ballarat Regional Soccer Facility.
