= Smythes Creek =

Smythes Creek Victoria
- Coordinates: 37°36′03″S 143°45′57″E
- Population: 1,762 (2021 census)
- Postcode(s): 3351
- LGA(s): Golden Plains Shire; City of Ballarat
- State electorate(s): Ripon
- Federal division(s): Ballarat

Smythes Creek is a locality in the City of Ballarat and Golden Plains Shire, Victoria, Australia. At the 2021 census, Smythes Creek had a population of 1,762.
