= Lake Wendouree =

Lake near the suburb of Ballarat, Victoria, Australia

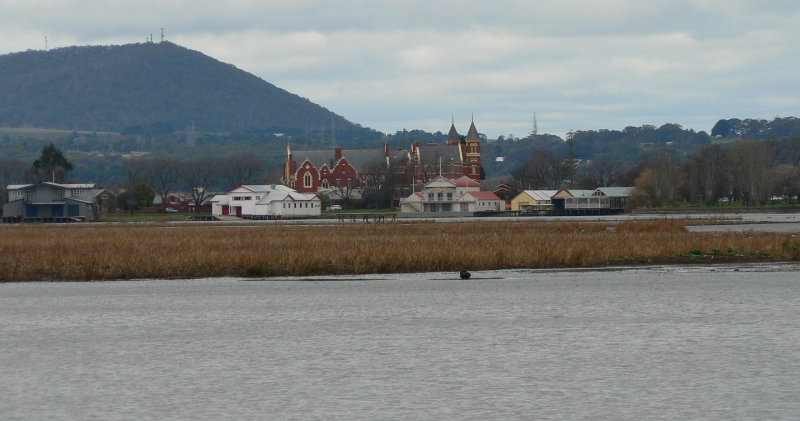
- The lake pictured in 2006, looking towards central Ballarat and beyond to Mount Warrenheip

- Location in Victoria
- Location: Ballarat, Victoria
- Coordinates: 37°33′02″S 143°50′00″E
- Type: Artificial
- Primary inflows: Gong Gong Reservoir; various
- Primary outflows: Gnarr Creek outlet; evaporation
- Basin countries: Australia
- Max. length: 2 km (1.2 mi)
- Max. width: 1.4 km (0.87 mi)
- Surface area: 2.38 km^{2} (0.92 sq mi)
- Average depth: 2 m (6 ft 7 in)
- Water volume: 3,860 ML (850,000,000 imp gal; 1.02×10^{9} US gal)
- Shore length^{1}: 6 km (3.7 mi)
- Surface elevation: 453 m (1,486 ft)
- Settlements: Ballarat
- ^{1} Shore length is not a well-defined measure.

Lake Wendouree (/ˌwɛndəˈriː/) is an artificially created and maintained shallow urban lake located adjacent to the suburb of the same name in the city of Ballarat, Victoria, Australia. The name Wendouree comes from a local Aboriginal word wendaaree which means 'go away': a story is told that when settler William Cross Yuille asked a local Indigenous woman what the name of the swamp was, that was her reply.

== Location and features ==
Lake Wendouree is one of the smallest of a complex of natural wetlands which includes nearby Lake Burrumbeet and Lake Learmonth on the plains of the Central Highlands. The swamp was dammed following the Victorian gold rush in 1851 and since the 1860s it has been a popular recreational lake for Ballarat's citizens. Lake Wendouree now holds significant historical, environmental, and recreational values to the Ballarat community. The lake was modified and developed to host the rowing and canoeing events during the 1956 Olympic Games.

During its history, the shallow lake has dried up during drought conditions, the most recent an extended period between 2006 and 2011.

== History ==
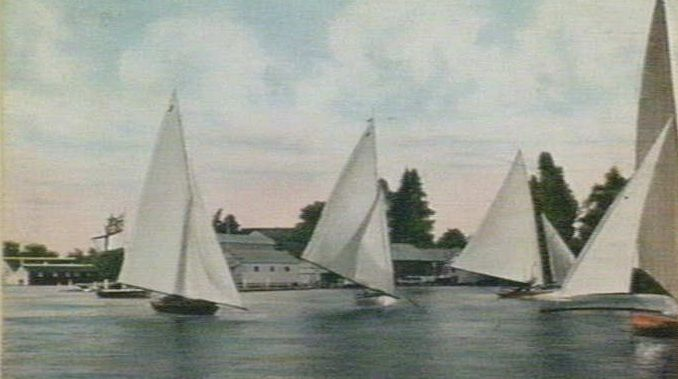
Sailboats on the lake in 1905

In ancient times Lake Wendouree was originally a stream which flowed to the west but a lava flow caused it to be dammed on three sides and it now drains to the east, eventually into the Yarrowee River. The swamp was known to Europeans as "Black Swamp" due to its dense dark reeds. It was later known as "Yuille's Swamp" after William Cross Yuille who settled just south of it. When Ballarat was first surveyed in 1851 by William Swan Urquhart, the swamp was recorded as Wendouree and the misunderstood Aboriginal word became the official name.

Renowned fly-fishing author Alfred Ronalds established Ballarat's first garden nursery in 1854 at the outlet stream that flowed from the swamp and irrigated it from this creek. He also built large tanks there and provided water for the town. Plans to dam the outlet began as early as the first surveying and the bank was raised and a pipeline was installed in 1858 to supply the burgeoning gold rush settlement. A corroboree was observed at the Wendouree Swamp in March 1857 by a Ballarat Times reporter.

In 1864 a rowing course was first cut through the reedy swamp and the first steamboats arrived. In 1869 a severe drought caused the lake to dry up completely however the water returned the following year and the boats returned. Within a decade it had become the recreational focus of Ballarat, a popular destination and by the 1880s dozens of paddle steamers, ferries, yachts and rowers were using the lake's waters and newly built boat sheds and the establishment of Victorian era gardens around its banks.

Lake Wendouree hosted the rowing and canoeing events for the 1956 Summer Olympics. An Olympic monument now marks the end of the course.

Apart from private bore water the lake quickly ceased being the city's private water supply with the introduction of new sources including the Gong Gong Reservoir.

=== 2000s drought ===
A dry Lake Wendouree in 2006, due to the Millennium Drought

Swimming is not recommended

The 2000s Australian drought caused Lake Wendouree to dry up in 2006. Despite warnings by the local council and news publications, local enthusiasts combed below the surface of the dry lake bed for artifacts, including antique glass bottles. The activities of a number of local organisations, including boating clubs, rowing clubs and recreational fishers, had to be suspended, and the dry lake had a large tourism impact on Ballarat.

During the summer of 2008–2009, fairy grass growing on the dried up lake bed caught fire multiple times.

Better than expected winter rainfall in 2010, as well as storm water and wetland works in 2008 and 2009, saw the lake again reach full capacity in 2011.

== Wildlife ==
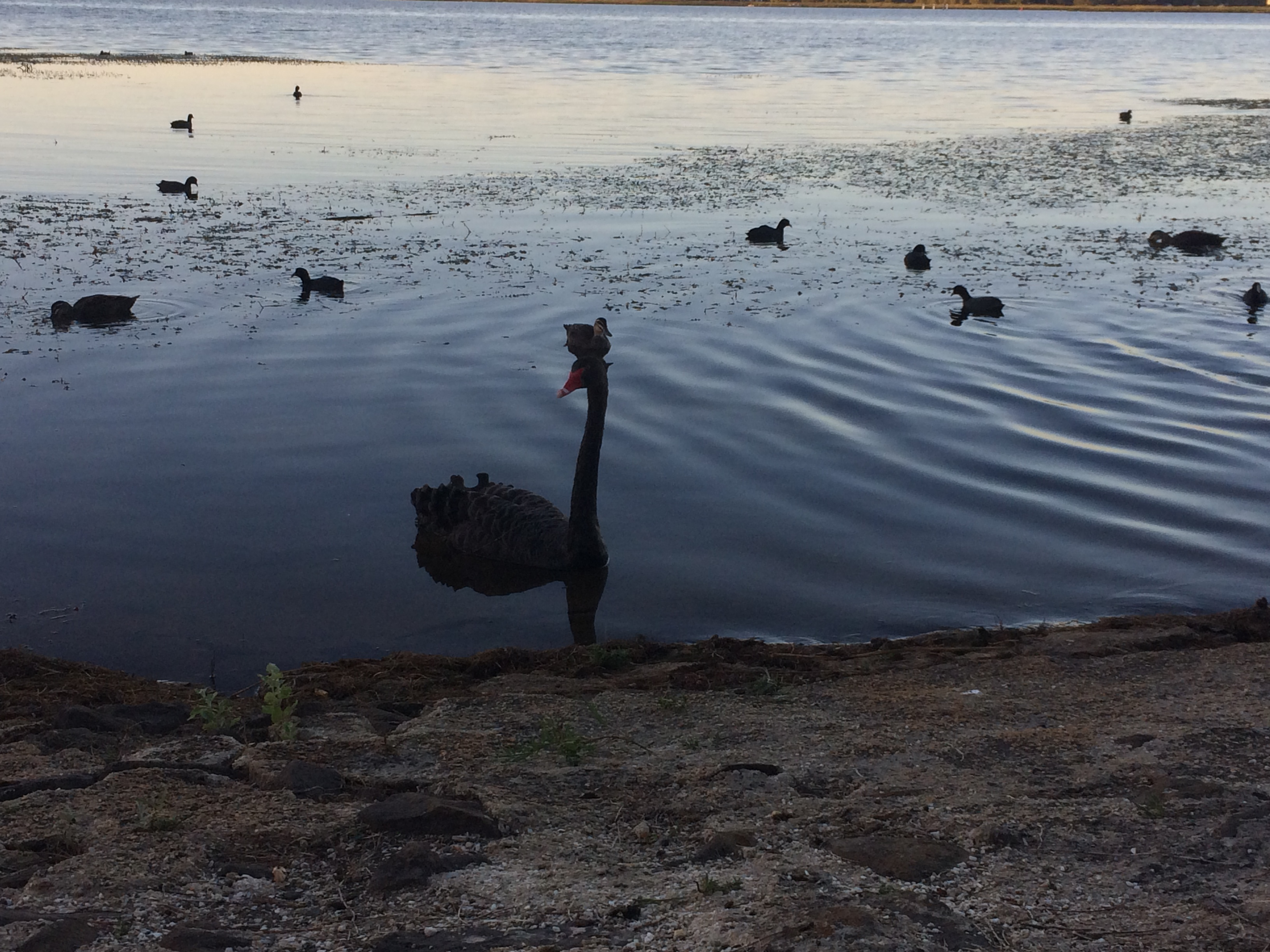
Black swans and other birds on Lake Wendouree

The reed beds and islands provide sanctuary for a variety of wildlife. Of the recorded 166 species, the most commonly seen waterbirds are black swans, Pacific black ducks, dusky moorhens, purple swamphens, Eurasian coots, musk ducks, great crested grebes, silver gulls and little pied cormorants. Information boards at the Fairyland Wetland Walk provide details about species and habitats.

About 100 rakali are scattered around the shore and are sometimes seen in Fairyland at dawn and dusk. The diversity of pondlife is rich and attracts numerous school groups making visits for environmental science field studies.

== Transport ==
A vintage electric tramway operates along the western side of the lake. The volunteers of the Ballarat Tramway Museum have preserved fifteen trams and memorabilia from Ballarat's tramway era. Attracting twenty thousand passengers each year, it is one of Ballarat's most popular tourist attractions. Double-decker horse-drawn trams began carrying visitors to the Ballarat Botanical Gardens in 1887.

Paddlesteamers have used the lake in the past for both transport and as a tourist attraction and the most popular one, the Golden City has been restored for return to the lake, and does a tourist circuit each Sunday. The Begonia Princess paddleboat returned to Lake Wendouree in 2012 after being restored by the current owner and currently and is a popular attraction on the lake.

== Recreation ==
Boating has long been an important sport and leisure activity on the lake and for many years local schools have held the "Head of the Lake" rowing regatta there. Swimming in the lake is not recommended due to leeches and poor water quality.

The 6km track around the lake provides a challenge to walking, cycling and running enthusiasts. The record for running the 6 km lap of the lake is 16 minutes and 10 seconds, set in 1992 by Marathon Olympian Steve Moneghetti.

In recent years, it has been the venue for the annual Goldfields Festival and Springfest extravaganza.
