= Ballarat Central =

- Suburb
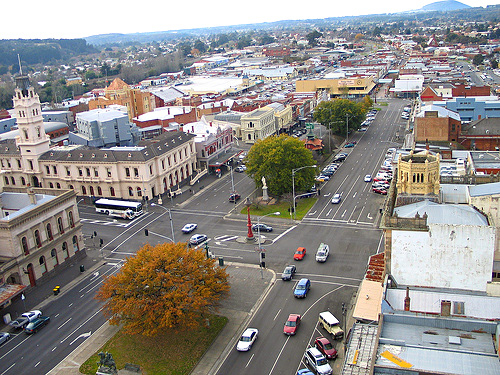
- Looking east over Sturt Street and the CBD toward Bridge Mall and Bakery Hill from Ballarat Town Hall clock tower

- Interactive map of Ballarat Central
- Coordinates: 37.563°S 143.851°E
- Country: Australia
- State: Victoria
- City: Ballarat
- LGA: City of Ballarat

Government
  - State electorate: Wendouree
  - Federal division: Ballarat

Area
  - Total: 3.7 km^{2} (1.4 sq mi)

Population
  - Total: 5,378 (2021 census)
  - Density: 1,454/km^{2} (3,760/sq mi)
- Postcode: 3350
Suburbs around Ballarat Central
Lake Wendouree	Soldiers Hill	Ballarat East
Lake Wendouree	Ballarat Central	Bakery Hill
Newington, Redan	Redan, Golden Point	Golden Point

Ballarat Central (known as the Central Business Area by the City of Ballarat and sometimes simply as "Ballarat") is the central locality of Greater Ballarat in Victoria, Australia. The population of Ballarat Central at the 2021 census was 5,378, making it the sixth most populous in the urban area. It is the administrative headquarters for the City of Ballarat as well as the Ballarat Base Hospital and health services and home to the city's major religious institutions and a major retail, commercial and inner city residential area.

It is the third oldest settlement in Greater Ballarat (after the gold rush settlements of Ballarat East and Golden Point). Planned as a permanent settlement shortly following the initial gold rush, it was formerly known as Ballaarat West or the new township of Ballaarat.

The boundaries are Lexton, Drummond, Talbot and Pleasant Street to the west; Sebastopol, Hill, Hummfray and Steinford Street to the south; Peel Street to the east and Serviceton Railway Line to the north.

Ballarat Central is important historically to the development of the city as well as for its Victorian era architecture and much of its area is covered by Heritage Overlays.

== History ==
=== Toponymy ===
While the original name for Ballarat Central was Ballaarat and later Ballarat West, the current name originates from the Central Division, a mining lead in the 1870s. Several sporting teams used the name, as well as the local primary school as early as the 1880s. It was officially gazetted "Ballarat Central" sometime after the 1980s although it is still marked simply "Ballarat" on some maps.

=== Settlement ===
The settlement of Ballarat West was established during the Victorian gold rush.

It was surveyed by William Urquhart as early as October 1851. By 1852 his grid plan and wide streets were prepared for the first land sales in the new township of West Ballarat.

As the city grew, Ballarat West became home to the city's middle class, bankers and wealthy professionals establishing businesses around Lydiard Street and institutions along Sturt and Drummond Streets.

== Population ==
In the 2016 Census, there were 5,328 people in Ballarat Central. 82.0% of people were born in Australia and 86.3% of people only spoke English at home. The most common responses for religion were No Religion 40.1% and Catholic 24.8%.

== Urban form and planning ==
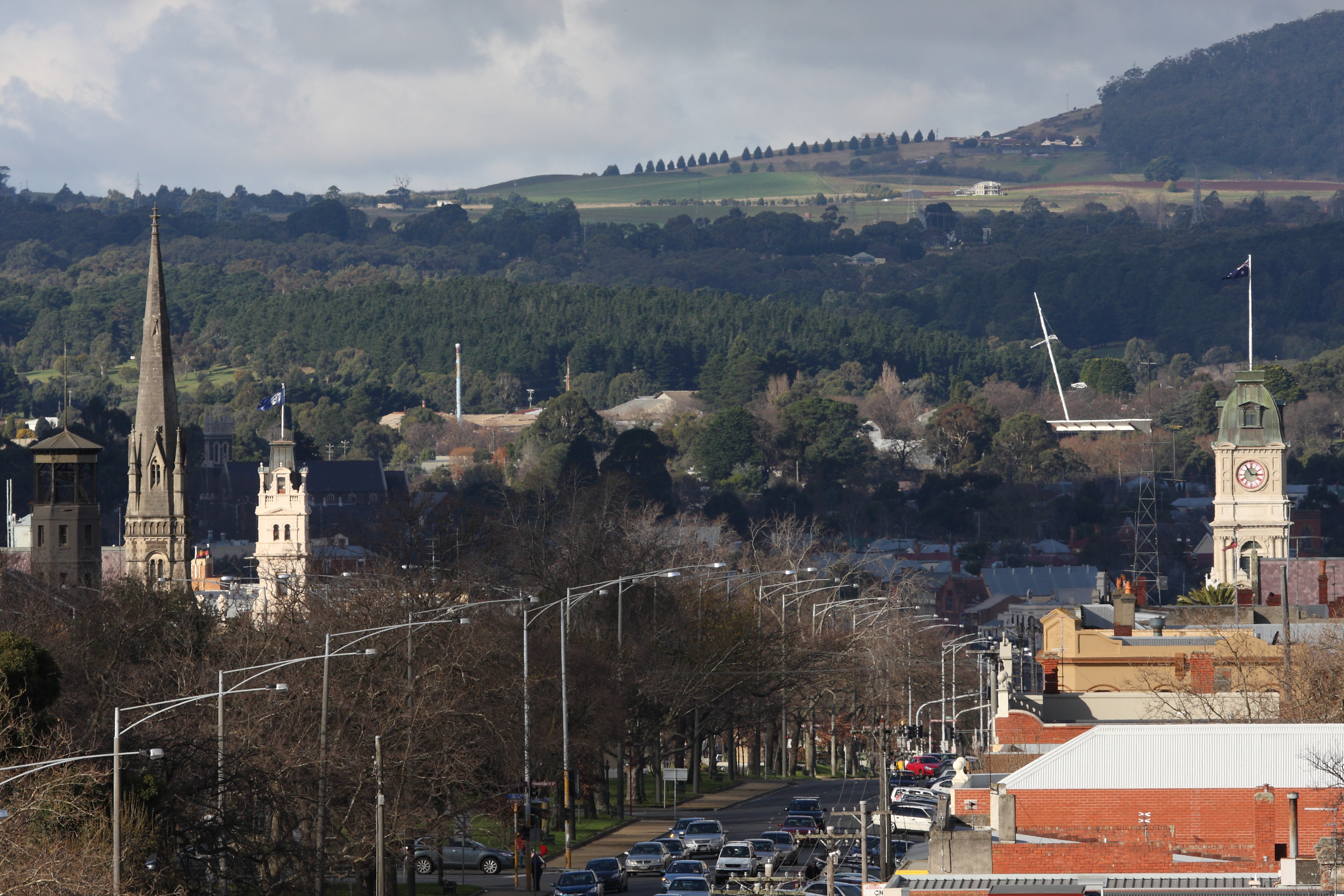
Sturt Street viewed from St. Peter's Anglican Church. The clock tower of the Ballarat Town Hall is also visible.

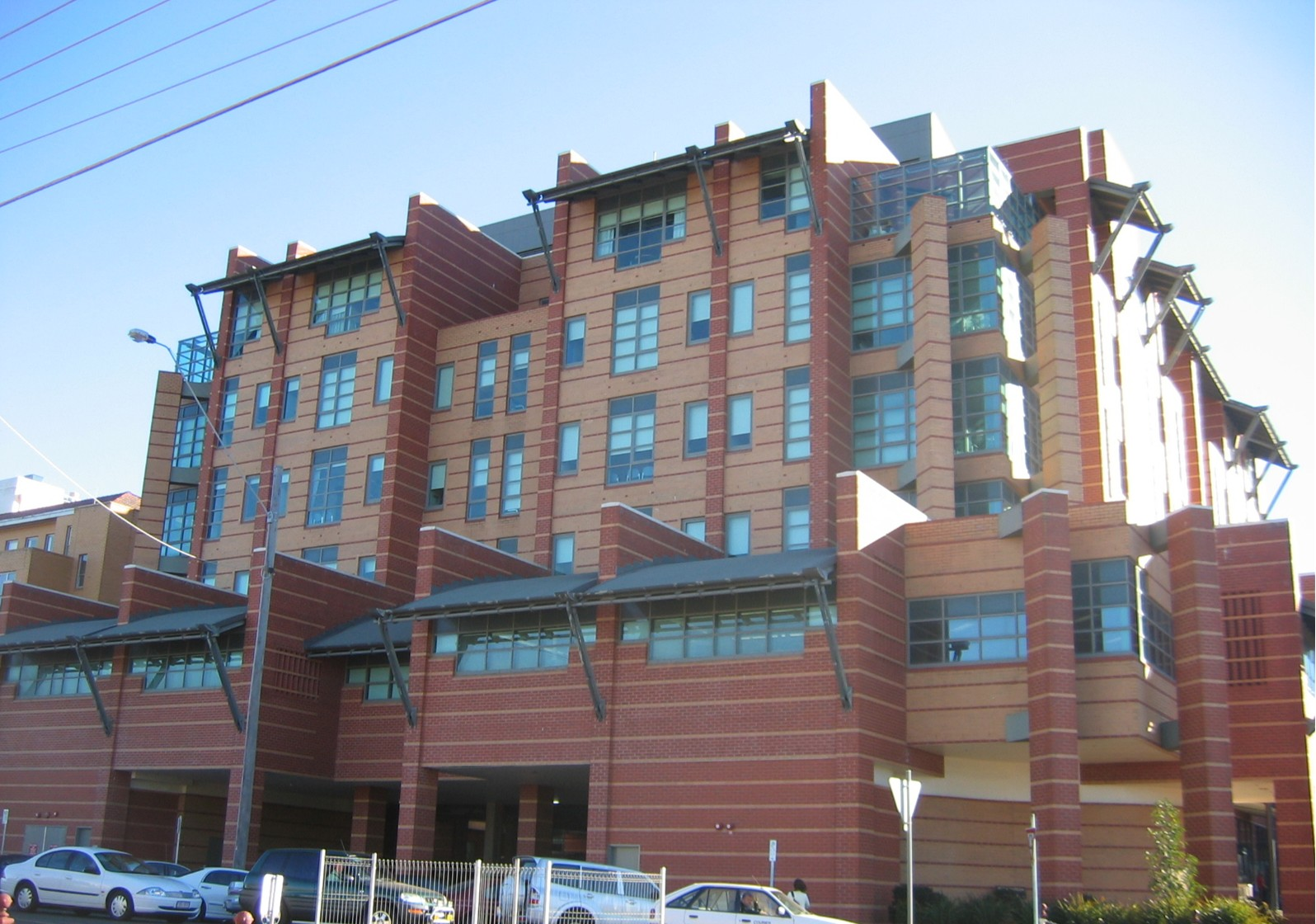
Ballarat Base Hospital's Henry Bolte Building is the tallest building in Ballarat Central

Ballarat Central is laid out in grid plan. The tallest buildings in the central city area is the seven storey Henry Bolte wing of the Ballarat Base Hospital (erected 1994); the Law Court (now Arts Academy) tower (erected 1941) on Camp Street; Lydiard House on Lydiard Street Nth; and the MLC tower Lydiard Street Sth, (erected 1957) at five storeys. Planning approval was granted in 2010 for a six storey building on Mair Street.

The Ballarat City Council approved a Central Business District Strategy for the development of buildings, development sites, transport and streetscape for the next 20 – 25 years in late 2010. It aims to secure funding and private and government interest in the ongoing development of Ballarat's CBD. The draft proposal identifies Mair Street as an alternate East-West traffic route with the potential for hi-rise mixed use development and possibilities for the creation of a 'Civic Heart' for the city where public events can be conducted on a regular basis.

== Retail ==
Ballarat Central contains the main retail area of Ballarat, however in recent decades it has been challenged by Wendouree. Ballarat's main pedestrian mall is Bridge Mall which occupies a section of Bridge Street between Grenville Street and Humffray Street. The largest indoor shopping mall is Central Square Shopping Centre (built 1988) opposite the town hall which includes the major department stores of Myer and Target. Other shopping malls in the CBD include Norwich Plaza built in the 1970s and the City Arcade built in the 1980s. In the CBD there are several supermarkets including two Coles, a Woolworths, an Aldi and a Big W as well as large specialty stores including The Good Guys, JB Hi-Fi, Dick Smith Electronics and branches of the big four retail banks. Bridge Mall, Sturt Street, Armstrong and Mair Street are the major retail streets in the CBD.

== Parks and open space ==
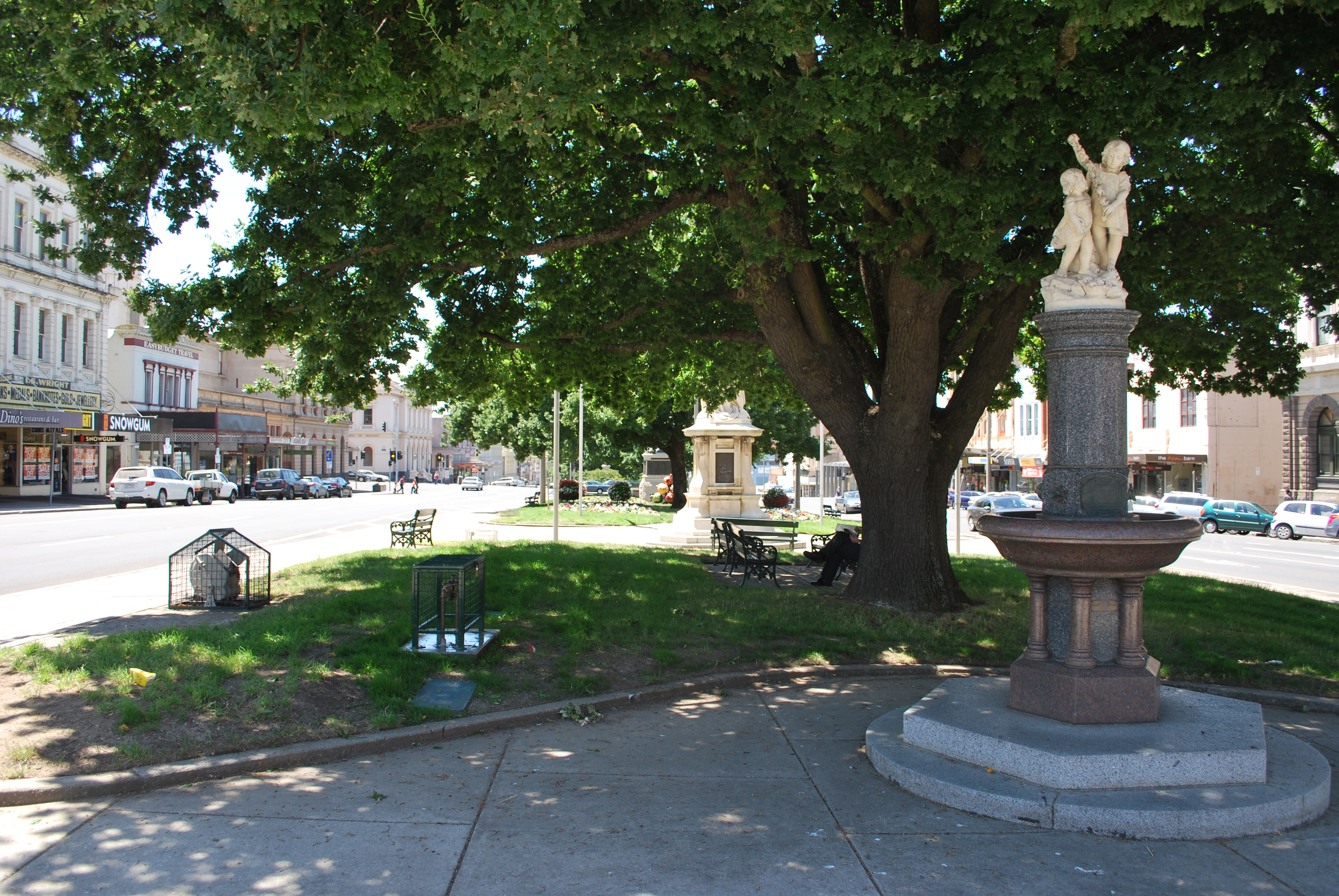
Sturt Street Gardens

With the exception of Sturt Street Gardens, and small squares at Civic Hall, Camp Street, Bridge Mall and church grounds there is very little accessible recreational space in Ballarat Central.

There are just two sports ovals on the Western Oval on the western fringe and Hickman Street Oval on the southern fringe.

== Transport ==
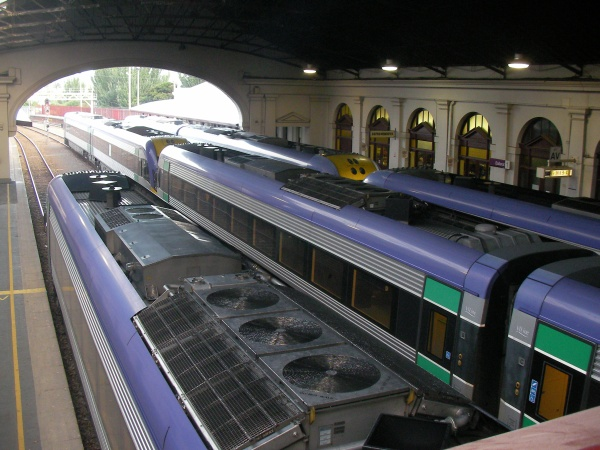
Modern fleet of VLocity railcars inside the train shed of Ballarat railway station.

Several busy roads pass through Ballarat Central, they include Lydiard Street (north-south and the historic business street); Mair Street (east west - commercial and future business area); Sturt Street/Bridge Mall (east-west - main retail area); Armstrong Street (north-south); Doveton Street and Drummond Street (the hospital precinct). Car parking is a major problem in Ballarat Central, with restricted parking times (parking meters). While there are several parking lots, including a multi-storey facility on Dana Street owned by the council, parking spaces are heavily used.

Ballarat is the hub of the Ballarat Transit bus network, with major terminals at Ballarat railway station and Little Bridge Street.

Ballarat railway station is the main railway station for Ballarat Central and also the urban area.

== See also ==
- Electoral district of Ballarat East
- Ballarat
