= Electoral district of Wendouree =

State electoral district of Victoria, Australia

Coordinates: 37.531°S 143.862°E

Wendouree Victoria—Legislative Assembly
- Interactive map of electoral district boundaries from the 2022 state election
- State: Victoria
- Created: 2014
- MP: Juliana Addison
- Party: Labor
- Namesake: Wendouree
- Electors: 43,575 (2018)
- Area: 64 km^{2} (24.7 sq mi)
- Demographic: Regional city
Electorates around Wendouree:
Ripon	Ripon	Ripon
Ripon	Wendouree	Eureka
Ripon	Ripon	Eureka

The electoral district of Wendouree is an electoral district of the Victorian Legislative Assembly in Australia. It was created in the redistribution of electoral boundaries in 2013, and came into effect at the 2014 state election.

It largely covers the area of the abolished district of Ballarat West, covering north, southwest and west suburbs of Ballarat, including Wendouree, Alfredton, Delacombe, Redan, Ballarat North, Invermay, Black Hill and Brown Hill, as well as much of the CBD. The south suburb of Sebastopol was moved to the adjoining district of Buninyong.

The abolished seat of Ballarat West was held by Labor MP Sharon Knight. While the redistribution made Wendouree notionally Liberal-held, Knight won the new seat with a swing to Labor.

In the 2021 boundary redistribution, Wendouree gained the suburb of Sebastopol while losing the suburbs of Brown Hill and Ballarat East, with the new boundaries being based on the Western Freeway with the district of Ripon and the Yarrowee River with the district of Eureka.

== Members ==
Member	Party	Term
Sharon Knight	Labor	2014–2018
Juliana Addison	Labor	2018–present

== Election results ==
2022 Victorian state election: Wendouree
Party	Candidate	Votes	%	±%
Labor	Juliana Addison	20,059	47.6	−3.1
Liberal	Samantha McIntosh	12,548	29.7	−4.1
Greens	Ellen Burns	4,386	10.4	+1.4
Family First	Ian Harkness	1,616	3.8	+3.8
Animal Justice	Bryn Hills	1,602	3.8	+0.2
Democratic Labour	Dianne Colbert	1,509	3.6	+3.6
Independent	Bren Eckel	455	1.1	+0.9
Total formal votes		42,172	95.2	+0.5
Informal votes		2,399	5.4	−0.5
Turnout		44,571	88.3	+1.8
Two-party-preferred result
Labor	Juliana Addison	26,109	61.9	+0.9
Liberal	Samantha McIntosh	16,063	38.1	−0.9
Labor hold		Swing	+0.9	
