= Prime Ministers Avenue =

Collection of busts of Australian Prime Ministers

Coordinates: 37°32′53″S 143°49′16″E

The Prime Ministers Avenue is a collection of busts of the first thirty prime ministers of Australia. They are lined along an avenue of horse chestnuts at the Ballarat Botanical Gardens, bronze casts mounted on polished granite pedestals.

The politician Richard Crouch commissioned Wallace Anderson to create the first twelve busts in 1939; he pledged £1000 (Note: Approximately AUS$98,738.98 in 2022.) to maintain the Avenue in perpetuity. The Governor of Victoria, Winston Dugan, unveiled the first six busts on 2 March 1940. Anderson created the first twelve from 1939 to 1943 and was later commissioned for the thirteenth and fourteenth. Ken Palmer, Victor Greenhalgh, Peter Nicholson, and Linda Klarfeld were later sculptors for the Avenue. After the Crouch fund was exhausted in 2014 with Julia Gillard's bust, the Ballarat City Council has been financing the Avenue. The council struggled to keep the Avenue up to date because of the rapid turnover of prime ministers in the 2010s. They have additionally been subject to repeated vandalism and theft over the decades.

As of May 2026, the current prime minister Anthony Albanese is the only prime minister who does not have a bust featured in the Prime Ministers Avenue. In January 2025, the heads of Paul Keating and Kevin Rudd were removed with an angle grinder, while 18 other busts were damaged in an act of vandalism.

== History ==
=== 1939–46: First fourteen busts ===
In 1926, the Ballarat-born politician Richard Crouch (1868–1949) began a lengthy series of donations to the city's institutions and sporting clubs. In June 1939, Crouch pledged £1000 (Note: Approximately AUS$98,738.98 in 2022.) to create life-sized busts of the twelve prime ministers of Australia. These busts would placed in what would be renamed the Prime Ministers Avenue, the "Horse Chestnut Walk" from the begonia house to the southern end of the Ballarat Botanical Gardens. Crouch felt that Ballarat suited such a memorial as it was once considered for federal capital. When the Avenue was first announced, Australian humourist Lennie Lower wrote that "the gardens are a place for quiet relaxation, and it is horrible to contemplate the idea of a bust leering out of the shrubbery and frightening little children." He thought that "the urge to paint red noses and paste moustaches on the busts would be almost irresistible."

The Australian sculptor Wallace Anderson was commissioned for eleven busts; Stanley Bruce's was prepared in London. (Note: In Anderson's entry in the Australian Dictionary of Biography, Ken Scarlett writes instead that "Between 1939 and 1945 [Anderson] executed a series of nine busts of Australian prime ministers for the Botanic Gardens, Ballarat." To the contrary, a notice in The Argus dated 19 November 1940 announced that Anderson had completed Bruce's bust.) In June 1939, Anderson invited Menzies and former prime ministers to sit down for him, which would take around four to five hours each. Working at his studio in Hawthorn, Anderson extensively studied photographs, public library records and biographies to design the sculptures of those he could not meet in person; he also sought their relatives' approval with the likeness. He moulded clay models with head-shaped armatures, and then used them to create plaster moulds and casts. From the plaster casts he made wax casts from gelatine moulds. The wax casts were then sent to Melbourne to be cast in bronze, in cooperation with Harold Herbert. The finished busts are mounted on plain granite bases and polished Harcourt granite pedestals.

Bronze busts of every Prime Minister from Barton to Lyons stand on granite plinths ranged on either side of a wide path. The passer-by can study the faces of our national leaders at his ease. Barton had a fine head for a sculptor, Deakin a nice face, too sensitive for a tough world; the plinth for Mr. Menzies is still unadorned, owing to the war, although a divertissement was created one day after troops arrived by the discovery of a fine dough model filling the blank. Neither Mr. Fadden nor Mr. Curtin has so far even a pillar to his name. But time will set right these omissions, and the long avenue ahead sunnily presupposes many years of Australian national progression.

— H. Drake-Brockman, 1944

On 2 March 1940, the first six busts were unveiled by the Governor of Victoria, Winston Dugan during his first visit to Ballarat. T. W. Cotton substituted for the unwell Crouch. It took two more years for Anderson to complete all the busts. In late 1941, he was still working on the twelfth prime minister, Robert Menzies, with an empty pedestal already in place at the Avenue. In October, Crouch paid £1000 in a government bond to the council. The council became trustees of the interest, which would be accumulated in a savings account to pay for new busts. Anderson finally completed the Menzies bust in September 1943 and it was installed the following month. When Menzies first saw the bust, he laughed and did not recognize himself, but conceded his praise to Anderson as he had never sat for him.

On 26 January 1944, it was discovered that the busts of Andrew Fisher and W. M. Hughes had been stolen from their pedestals. This was the first interference with the Avenue since its institution. They were recovered undamaged the next month, Fisher's at the George V statue on Sturt Street and Hughes' at the Ballarat Soldiers' Convalescent Depot. The theft was supposed to have been done for a lark. Following another £1000 donation from Crouch, Anderson sculpted the busts of prime ministers Arthur Fadden and John Curtin. They were added to the Prime Ministers Avenue in March 1946.

=== 1946–83: Forde to Fraser ===
The creator of Frank Forde's bust is unknown. In September 1946, Ben Chifley sat down for twenty-year-old Ballarat Arts School student Ken Palmer, who modeled Chiefly's bust for the Prime Ministers Avenue. This was the first time Chiefly had accepted a request for him to sit for an artist. Both Chifley and his private secretary N. M. Tyrell expressed their approval of the likeness. The bust was completed in October 1947. A replica mounted on a sandstone pedestal was later displayed at Bathurst's memorial to Chifley.

Crouch died on 7 April 1949. He had bequested enough money for the Prime Ministers Avenue until the trust was finally drained in 2014 with Julia Gillard's bust.

In 1952, photographer Ernest Shea compared the Prime Ministers Avenue to "a line of skeletons sticking their heads up out of the ground." When Robert Menzies visited Ballarat in March 1956 to open the Ballarat Begonia Festival, he reportedly concurred with comments that his bust was not a good likeness and that "it would be a good thing if the busts were removed". Residents flatly refused to remove Menzies' bust.

The busts of Harold Holt, John McEwen, John Gorton, William McMahon and Gough Whitlam were created by Victor Greenhalgh, best known for his large statue of George V which dominates the Sturt Street plantation in Ballarat. Greenhalgh was commissioned to create eight of the busts; originally, Greenhalgh also created Malcolm Fraser's bust. However, Greenhalgh and others were critical of the final casting.

=== 1983–2014: Fraser replacement, and Hawke to Gillard and thefts ===
Following Greenhalgh's death in 1983, Peter Nicholson (best known for his cartoons in the Nation Review, Financial Review and The Age) was asked to create a new bust for Fraser, which was completed after the bust of Fraser's successor Bob Hawke had been installed.

The busts of Malcolm Fraser, Bob Hawke, Paul Keating, John Howard, Kevin Rudd and Julia Gillard were created by Peter Nicholson. Nicholson's works have followed his philosophy that the busts should impart an expression of the character of the individual. He believes that Howard was dissatisfied with the size of his lower lip, and it is said that Keating was unhappy with his bust's weak chin and pointy nose. Nicholson has since supplied moulds of all seven of his sculptures to Ballarat council so that they can be recast in the instance of damage or theft.

In October 1975, a police investigation ensued after the head of Whitlam's bust was stolen, and in April 1995, the busts of Joseph Cook, Joseph Lyons and Gorton were stolen. The busts of Chiefly and Fisher were pulled over and others were knocked down; damage amounted to around $20,000.

Gillard's bust was erected in the Avenue in 2014, using up the last of the funds bequeathed by Crouch.

=== 2014–2024: Funding issues and Gillard to Turnbull ===
The 2010s saw the succession of five Australian prime ministers, and the council consequently struggled to keep the Prime Ministers Avenue up to date as well as to secure funding. In 2014 Ballarat councillor Des Hudson said that when the council asked the federal government for funding, they suggested that the council should finance the Prime Ministers Avenue themselves. The Ballarat council had repeatedly and unsuccessfully lobbied the federal government for funding in perpetuity, and has also called for expressions of interest from sculptors. In 2018, the city's director of development and planning confirmed that enough funding had been allocated for the Avenue through the public arts program. In 2018, the combined cost of one bust and its plinth was around $50,000.

The bust of Tony Abbott was created by Linda Klarfeld. In creating the bust she attempted to impart a sense of Abbott's perspective, including the "stamina to cope with day to day criticism". In 2017, Abbott's bust was draped with a crown of onions, likely a reference to when he was filmed eating a raw onion.

Upon Hawke's death in 2019, flowers were laid around his bust. In the early hours of 13 June 2020, the busts of Abbott and Howard were spray-painted with words ABC News described as "obscene".

The bust of Malcolm Turnbull was also created by Klarfeld and was commissioned using funding from the City of Ballarat's Public Art Program. Turnbull attended the unveiling in November 2022.

=== 2025–present: Vandalism ===
On 23 January 2025, a group of four vandals arrived in the southern part of the gardens in a silver ute at 1.23 am and damaged twenty of the busts in an act of vandalism. This entailed the removal and subsequent theft of the heads of the busts of former Labor leaders Paul Keating and Kevin Rudd with an angle grinder and the covering of the remaining statues' nameplates with spray paint including red crosses. Political rhetoric including the words "the Commonwealth will fall" was also later found at the scene. The vandals left 24 minutes later. Damage was estimated at $140,000; the busts were covered in black plastic and cordoned off by temporary fencing. Nicholson described the damage as "upsetting for me and also for Ballarat". Liberal leader Peter Dutton responded that people should have "great respect for our former prime ministers, regardless of if they are Liberal or Labor." The busts were restored and all repair work on the avenue was completed in late June 2025.

A bust of Scott Morrison, created by sculptor Martin Moore, was unveiled on 15 May 2026, leaving current prime minister Anthony Albanese as the only Australian prime minister not to have a bust featured in the avenue.

== Gallery ==
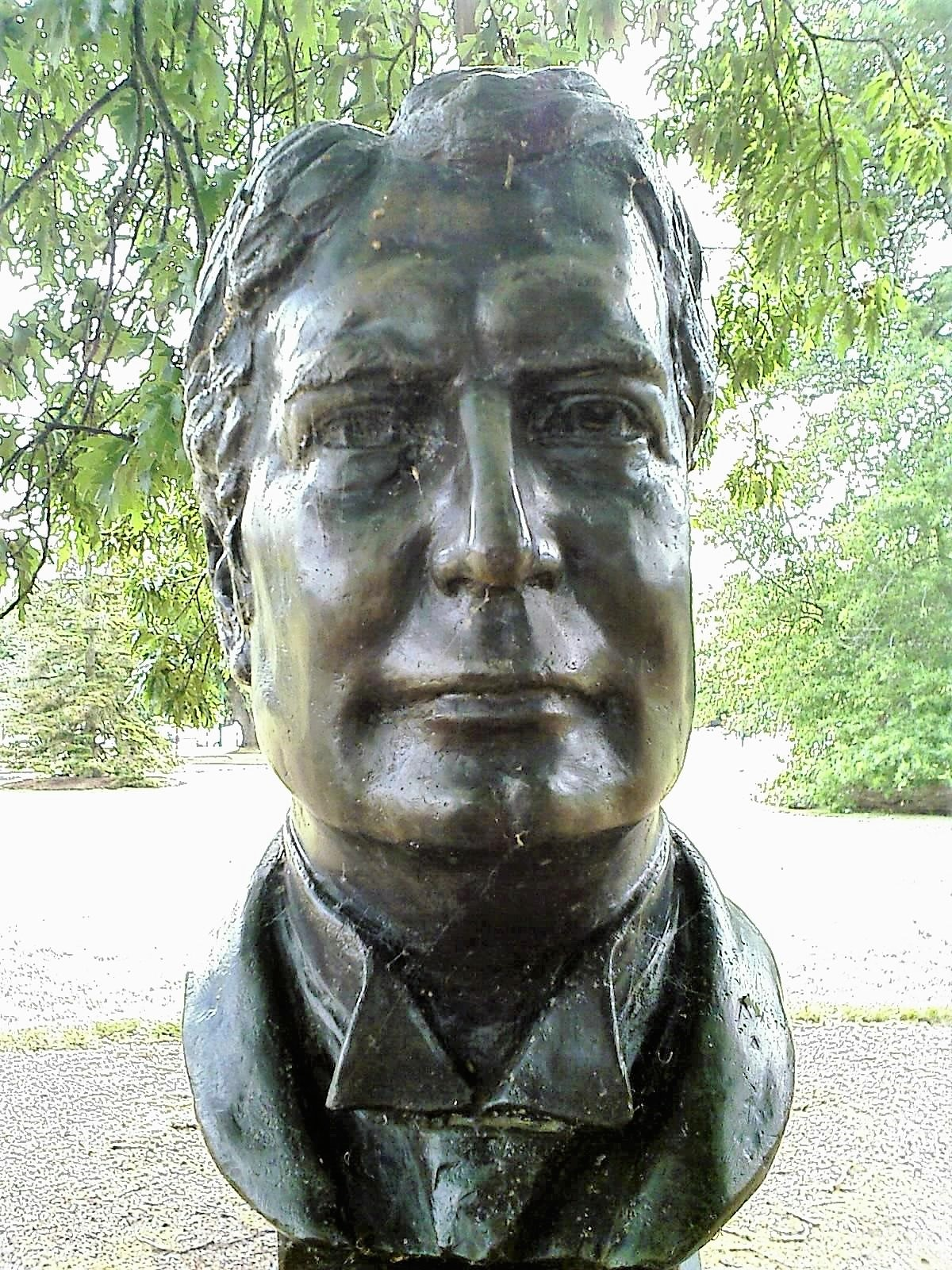
1st: Sir Edmund Barton

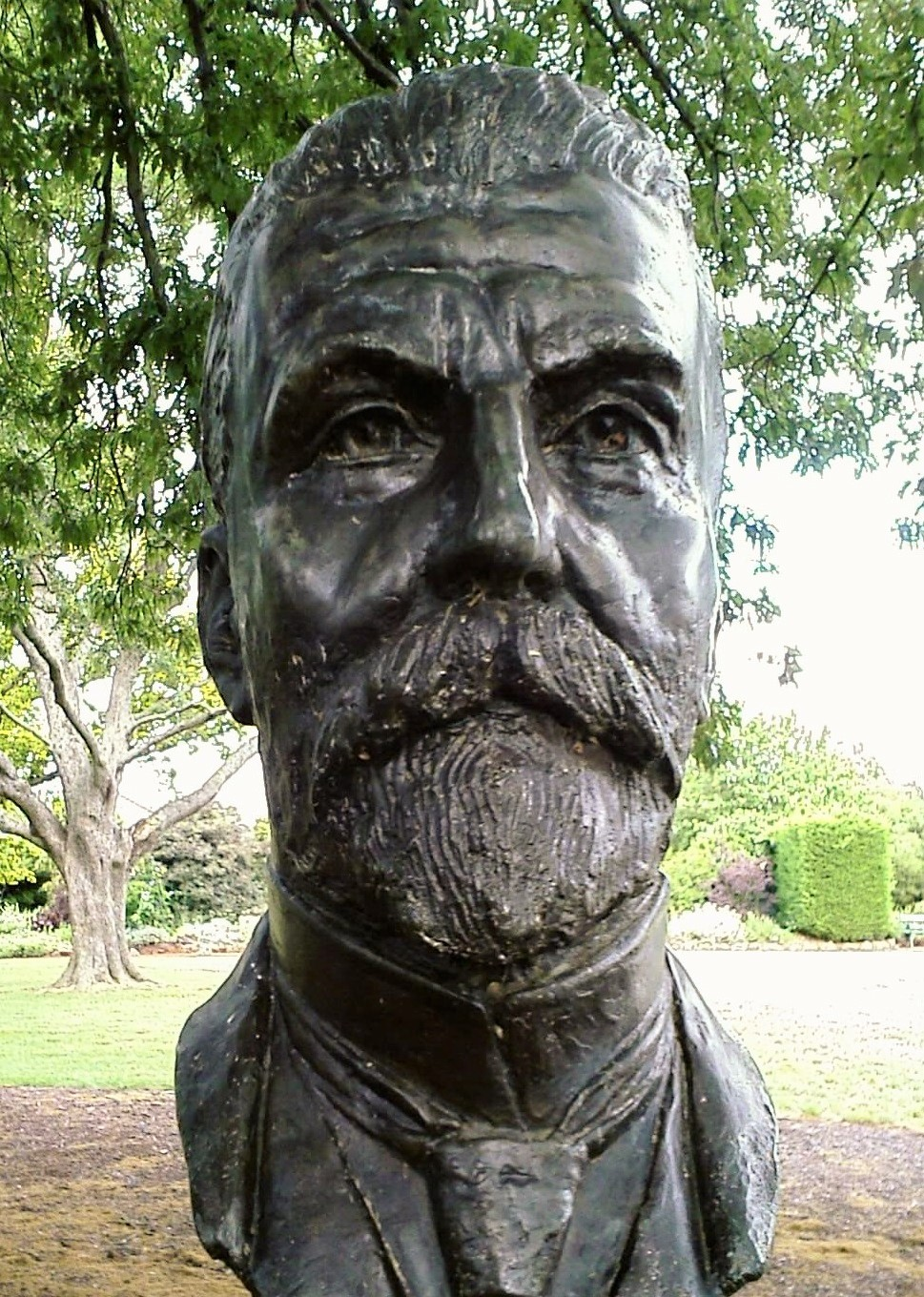
2nd: Alfred Deakin

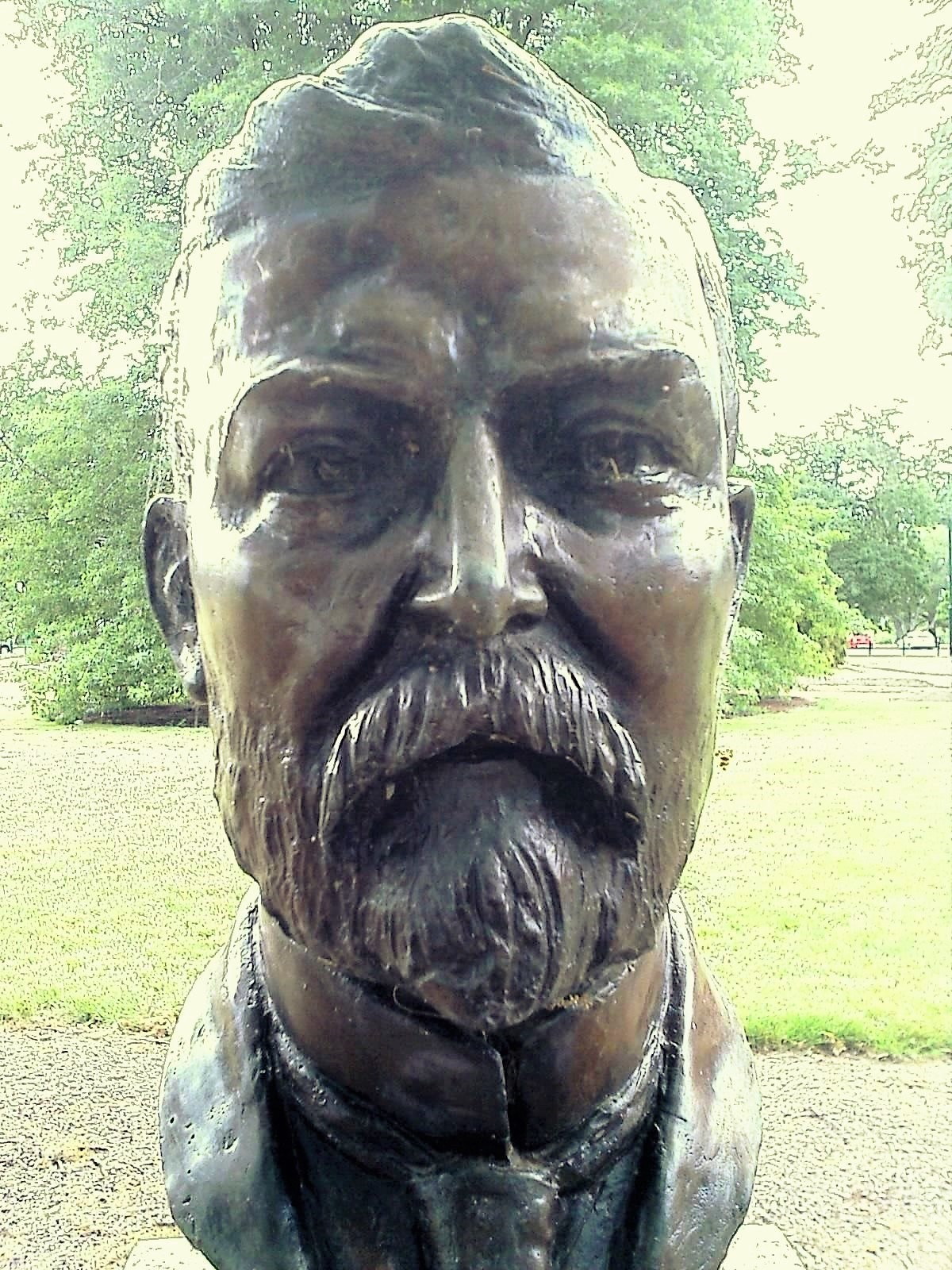
3rd: Chris Watson

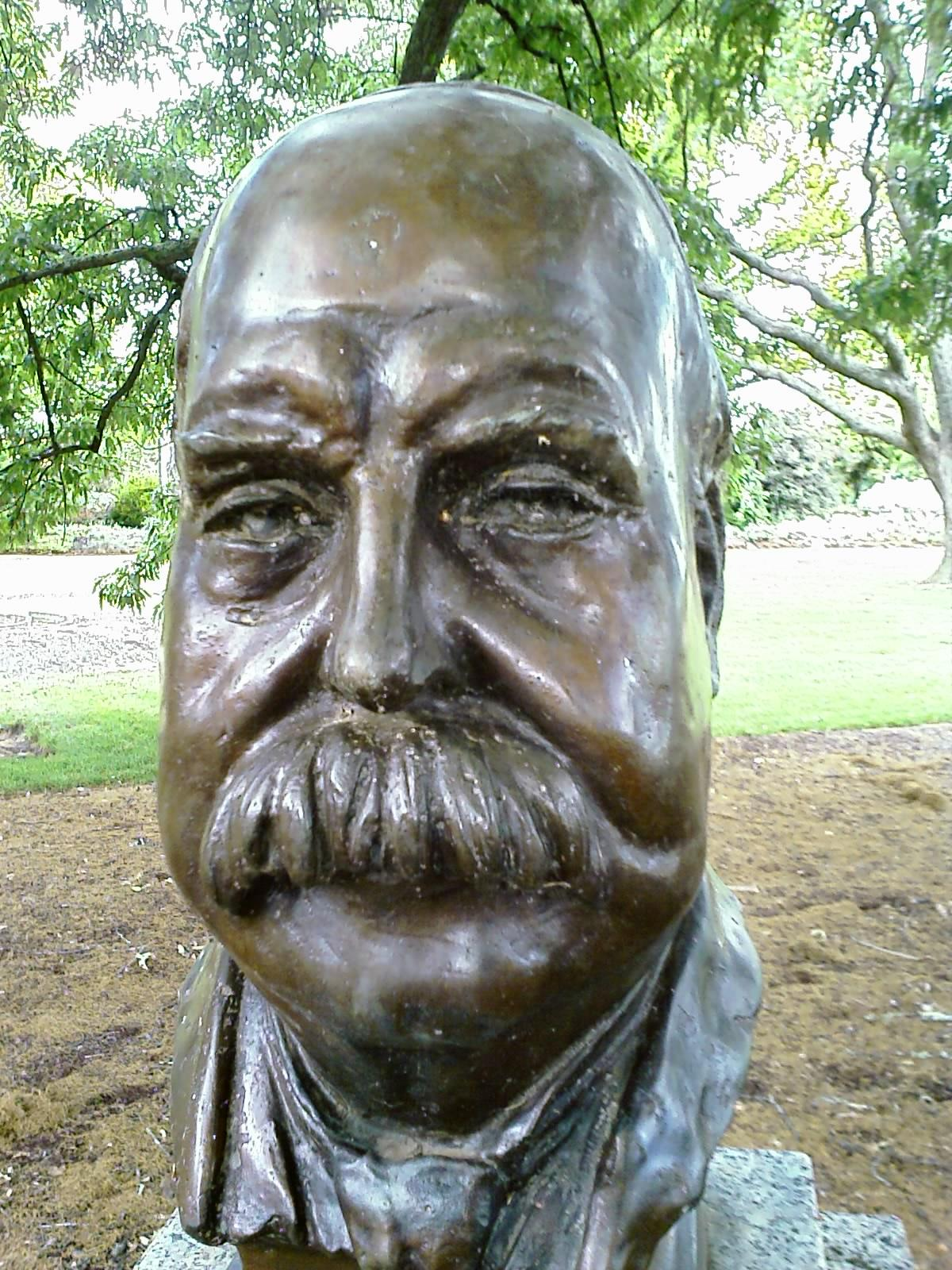
4th: George Reid

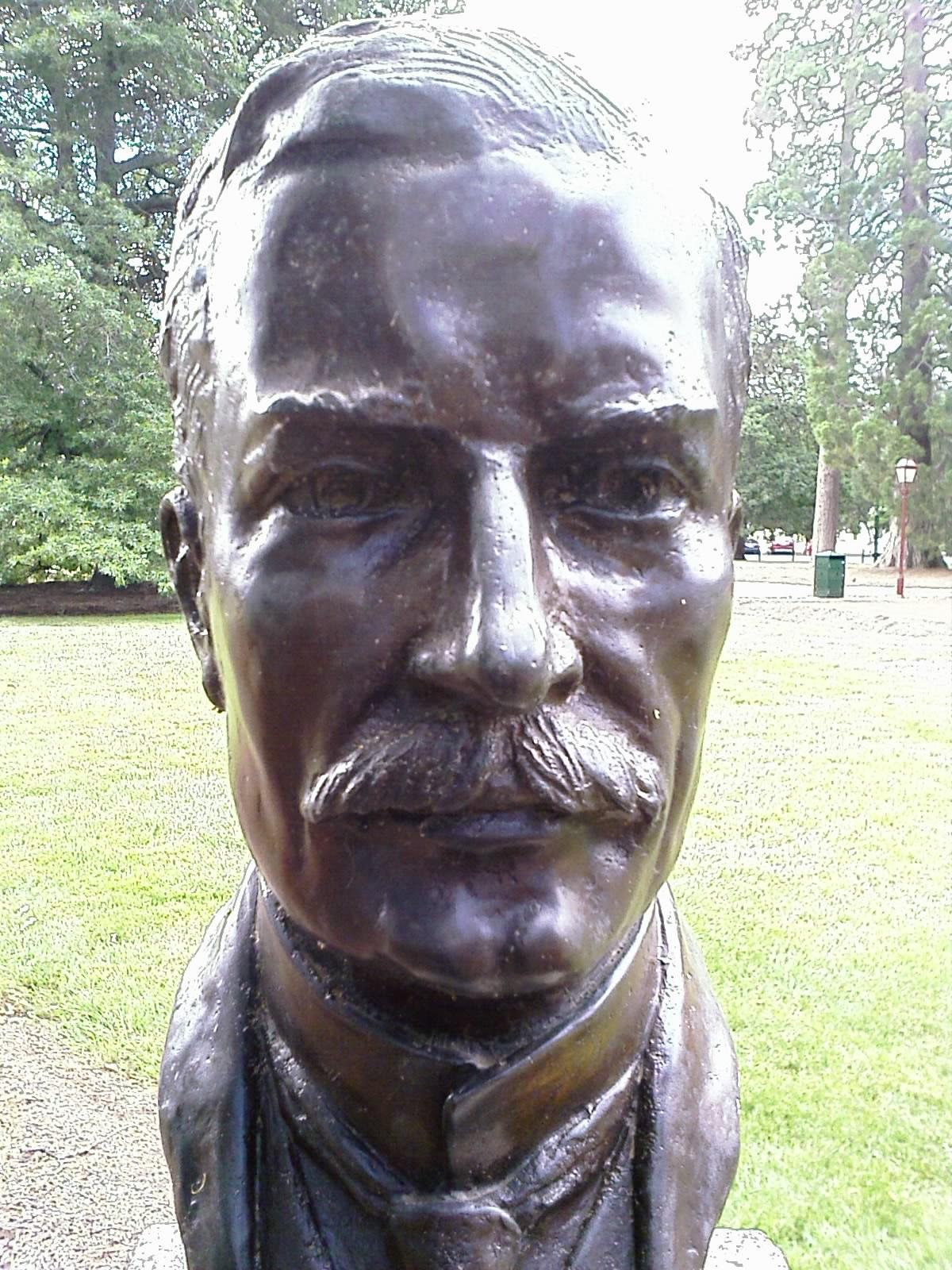
5th: Andrew Fisher

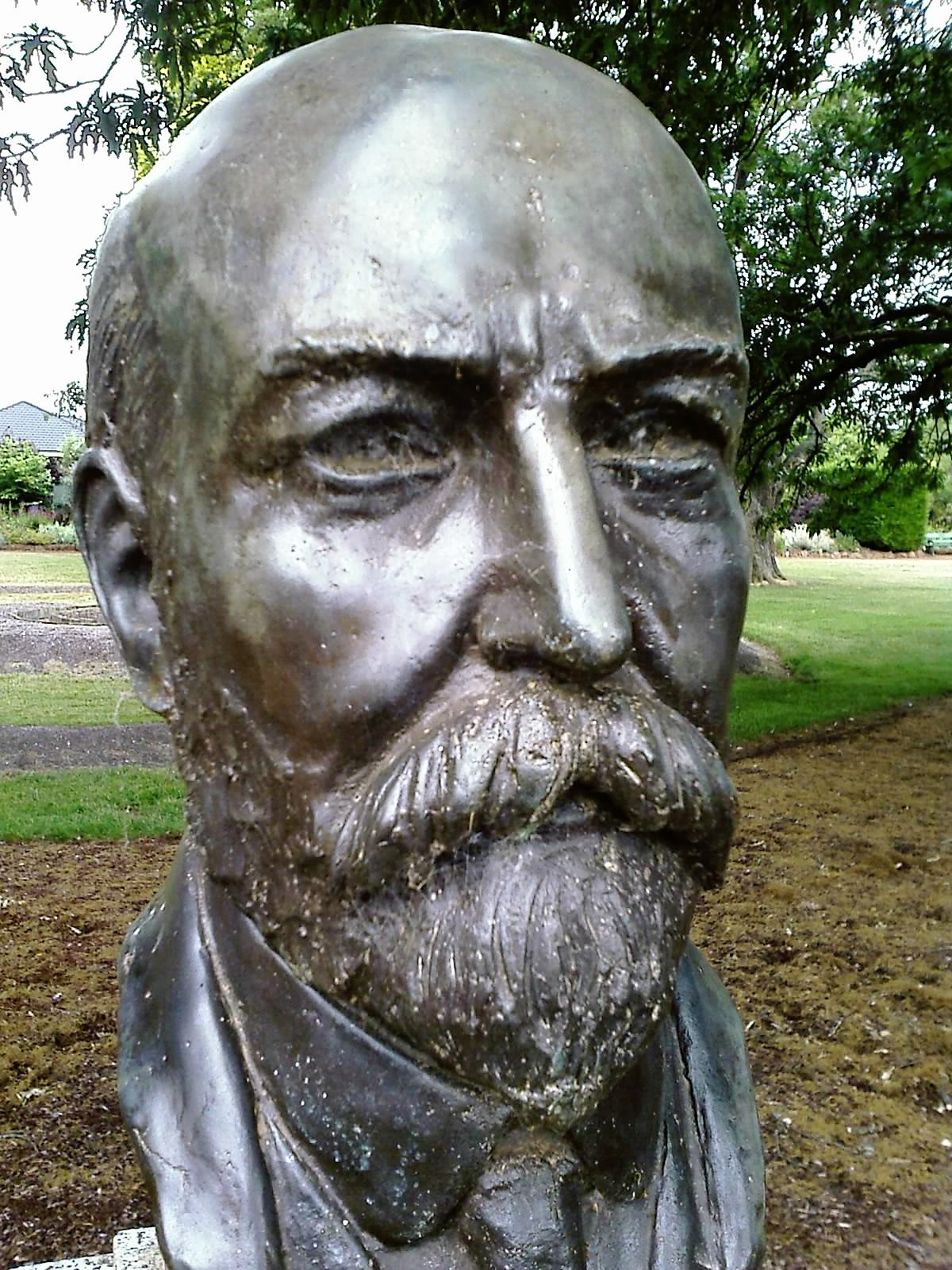
6th: Joseph Cook

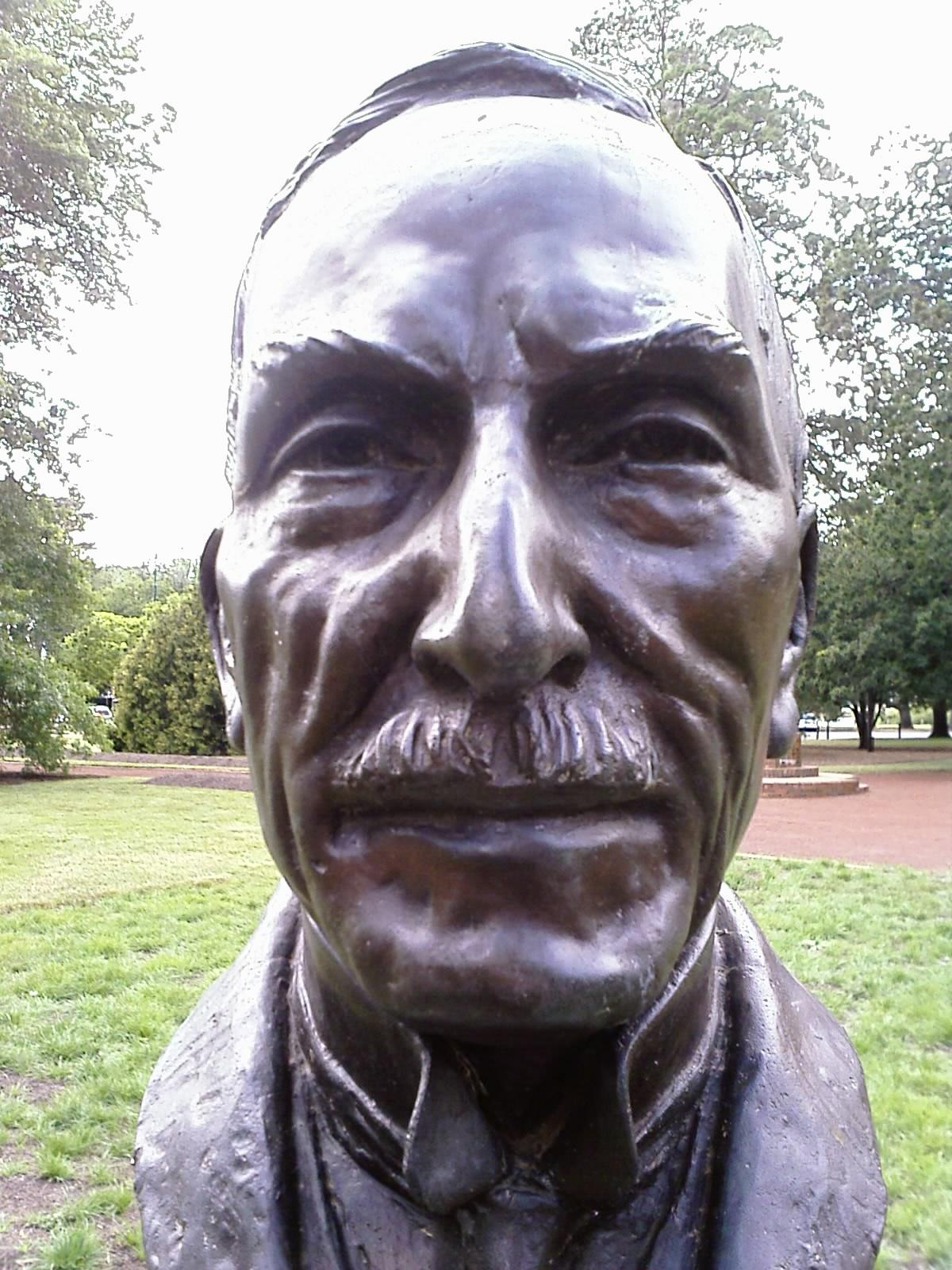
7th: Billy Hughes

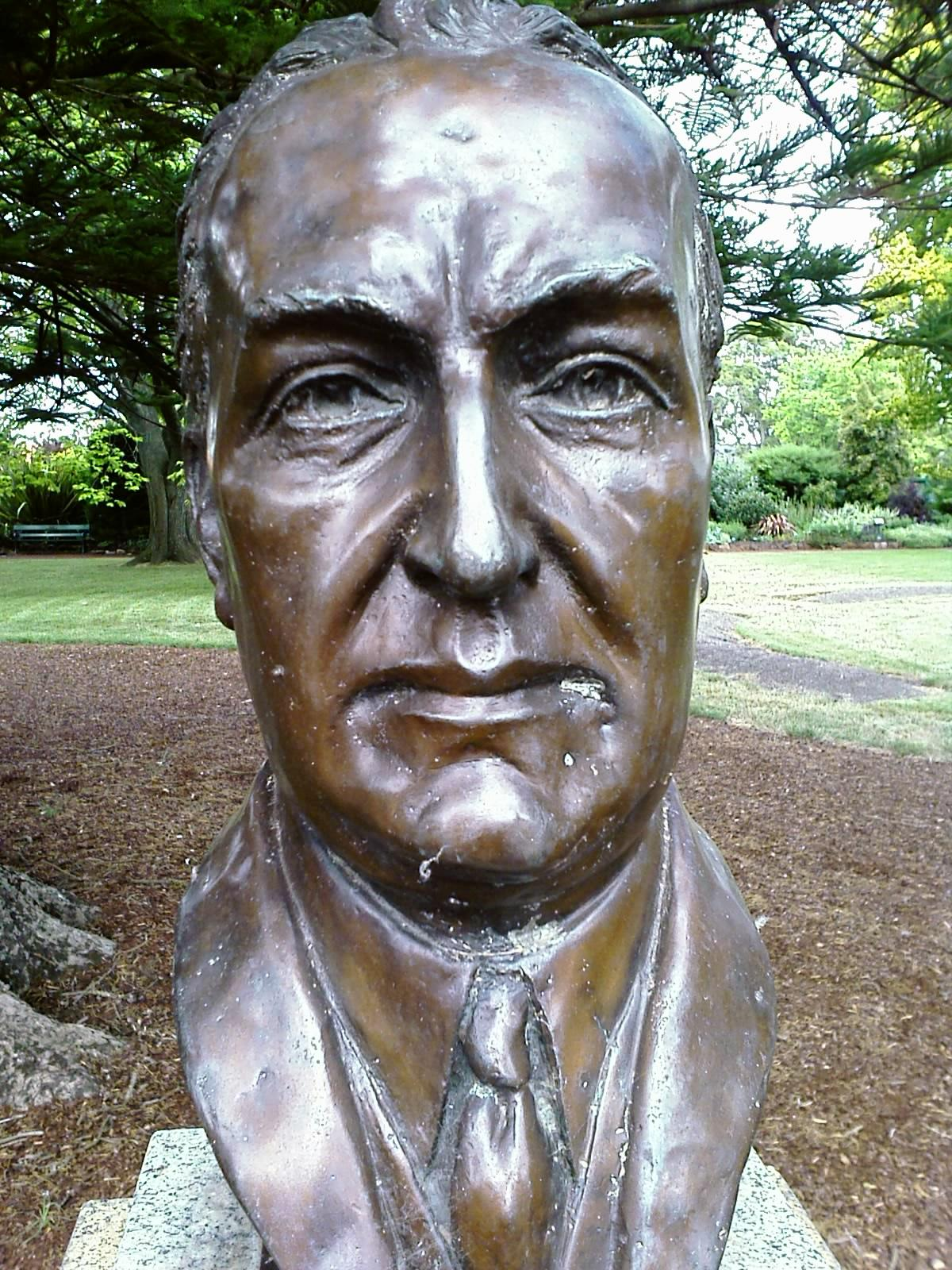
8th: Stanley Bruce

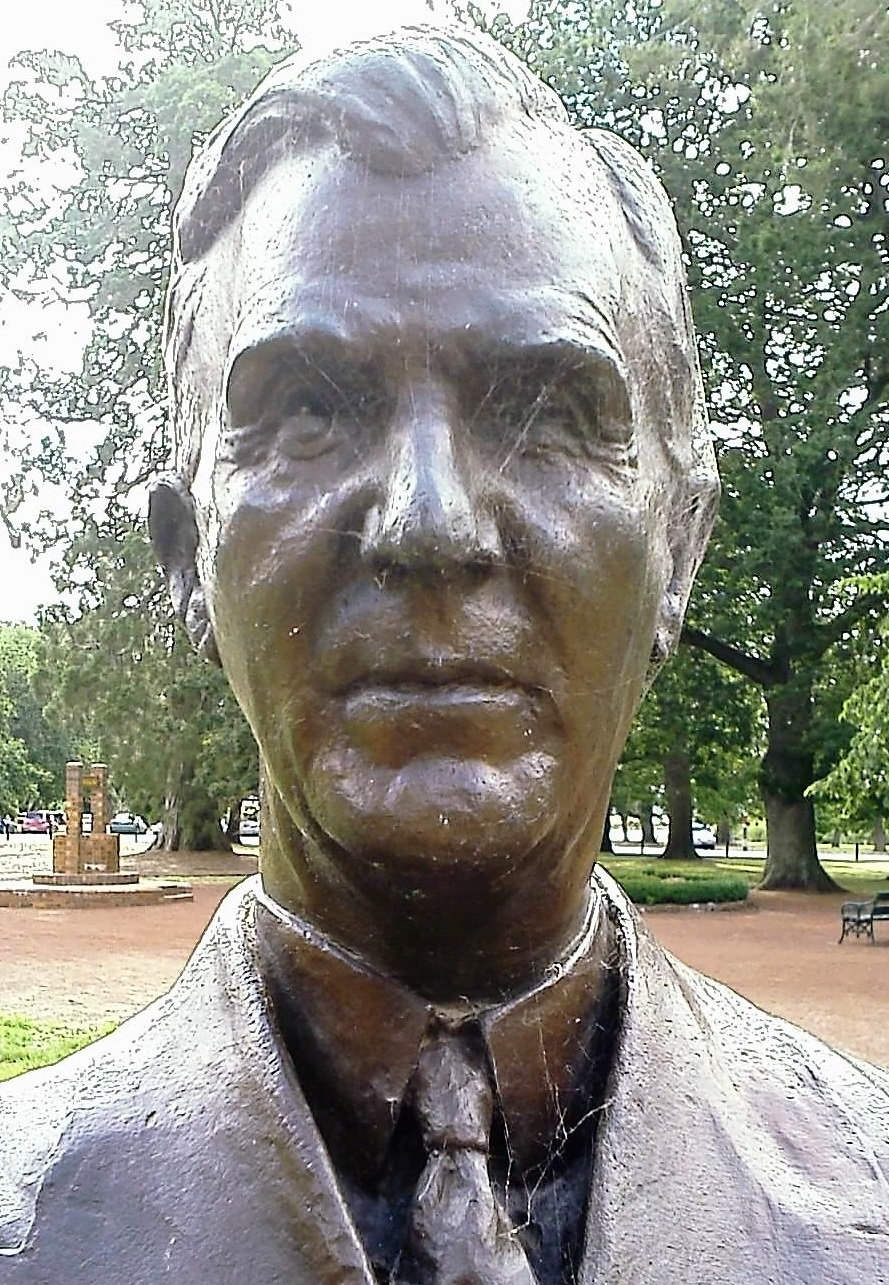
9th: James Scullin

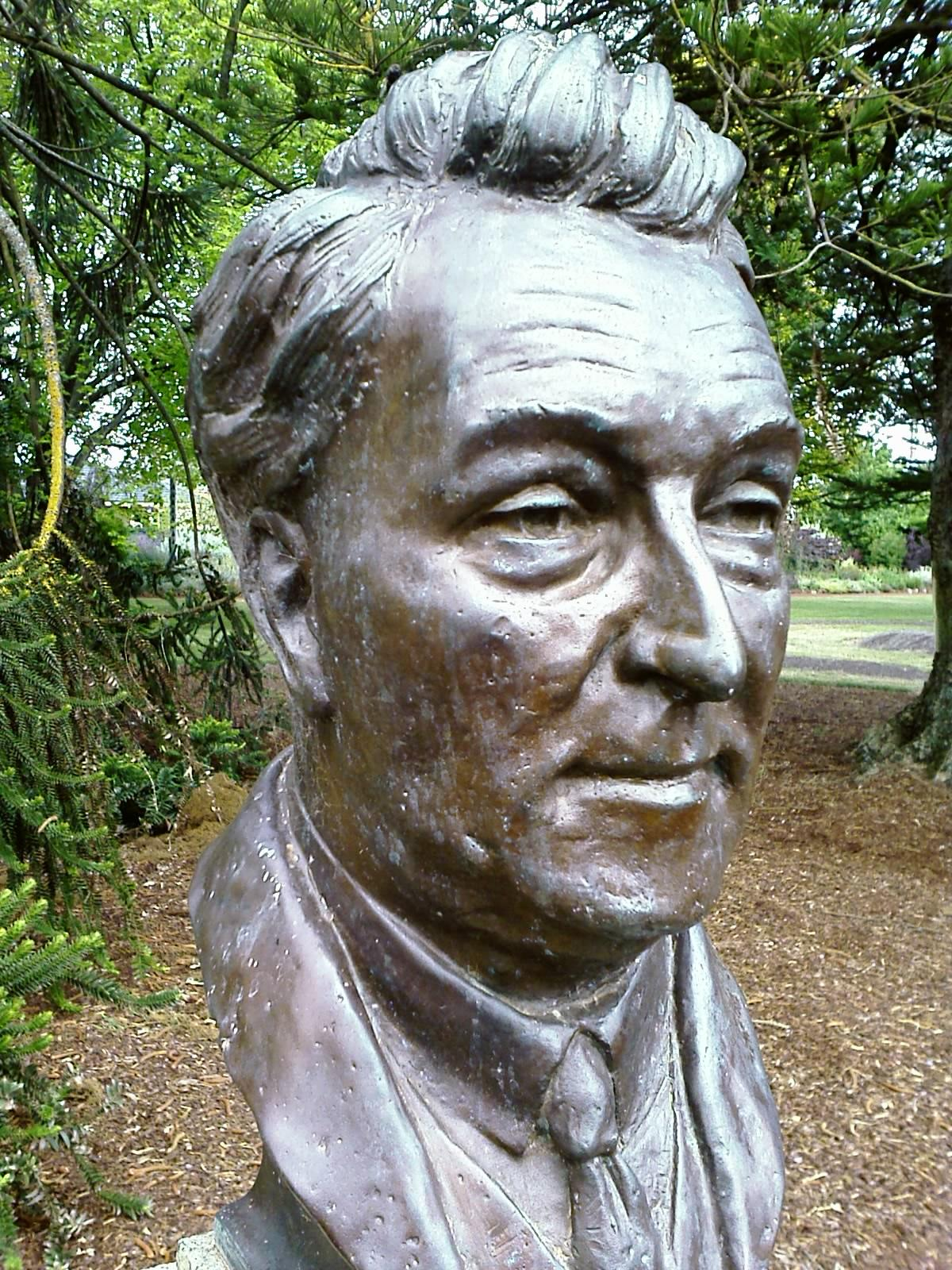
10th: Joseph Lyons

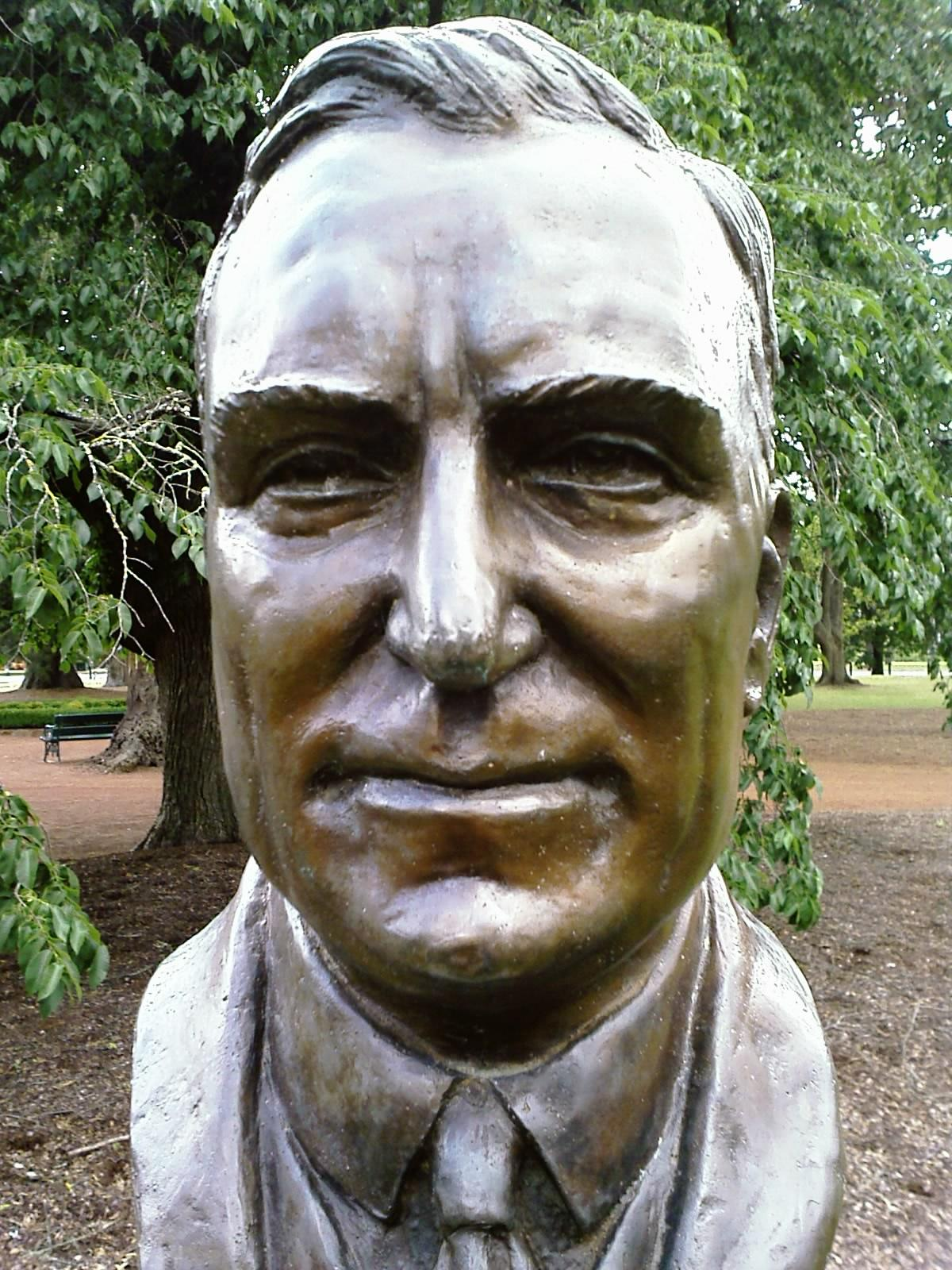
11th: Sir Earle Page

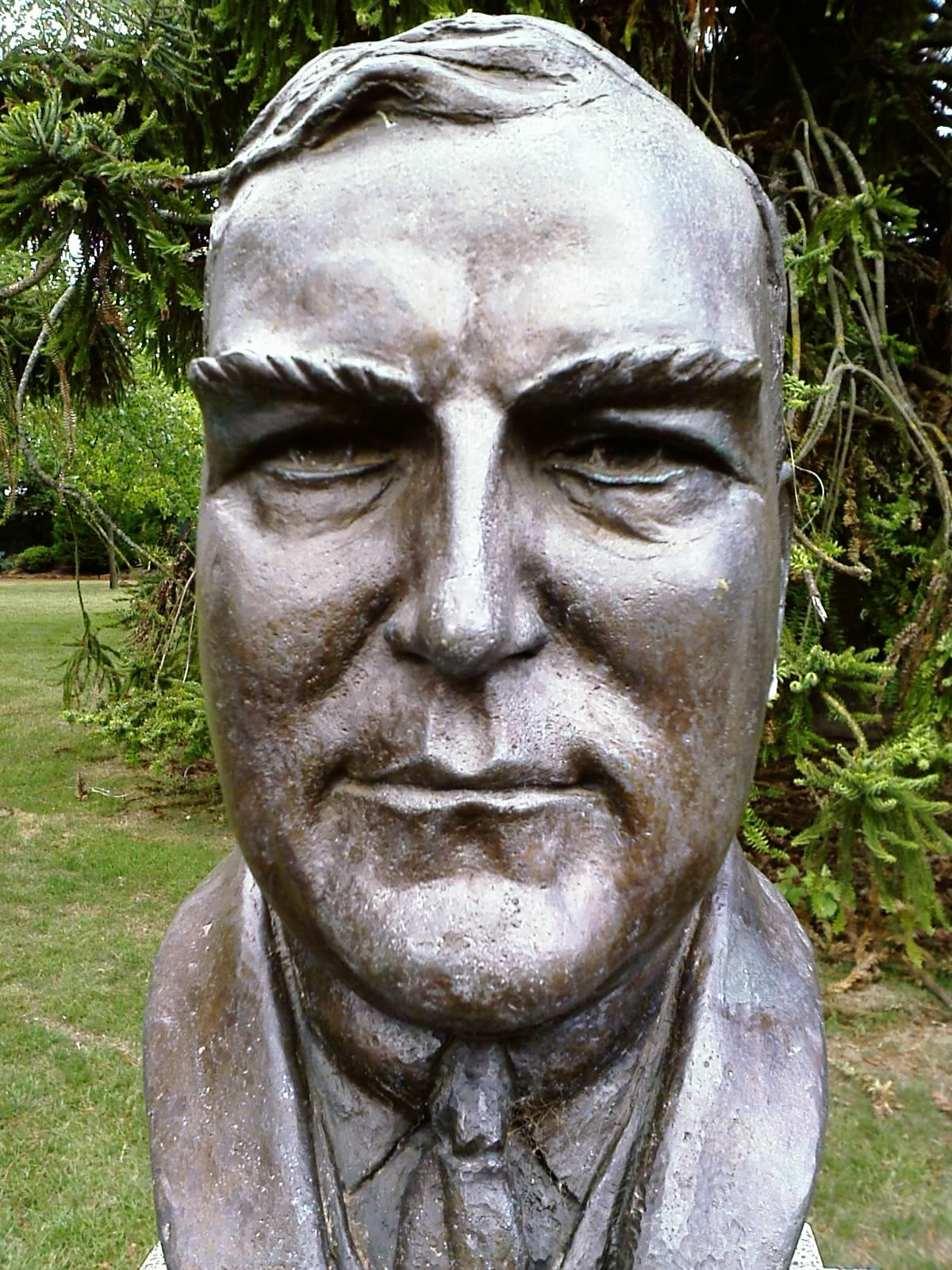
12th: Sir Robert Menzies

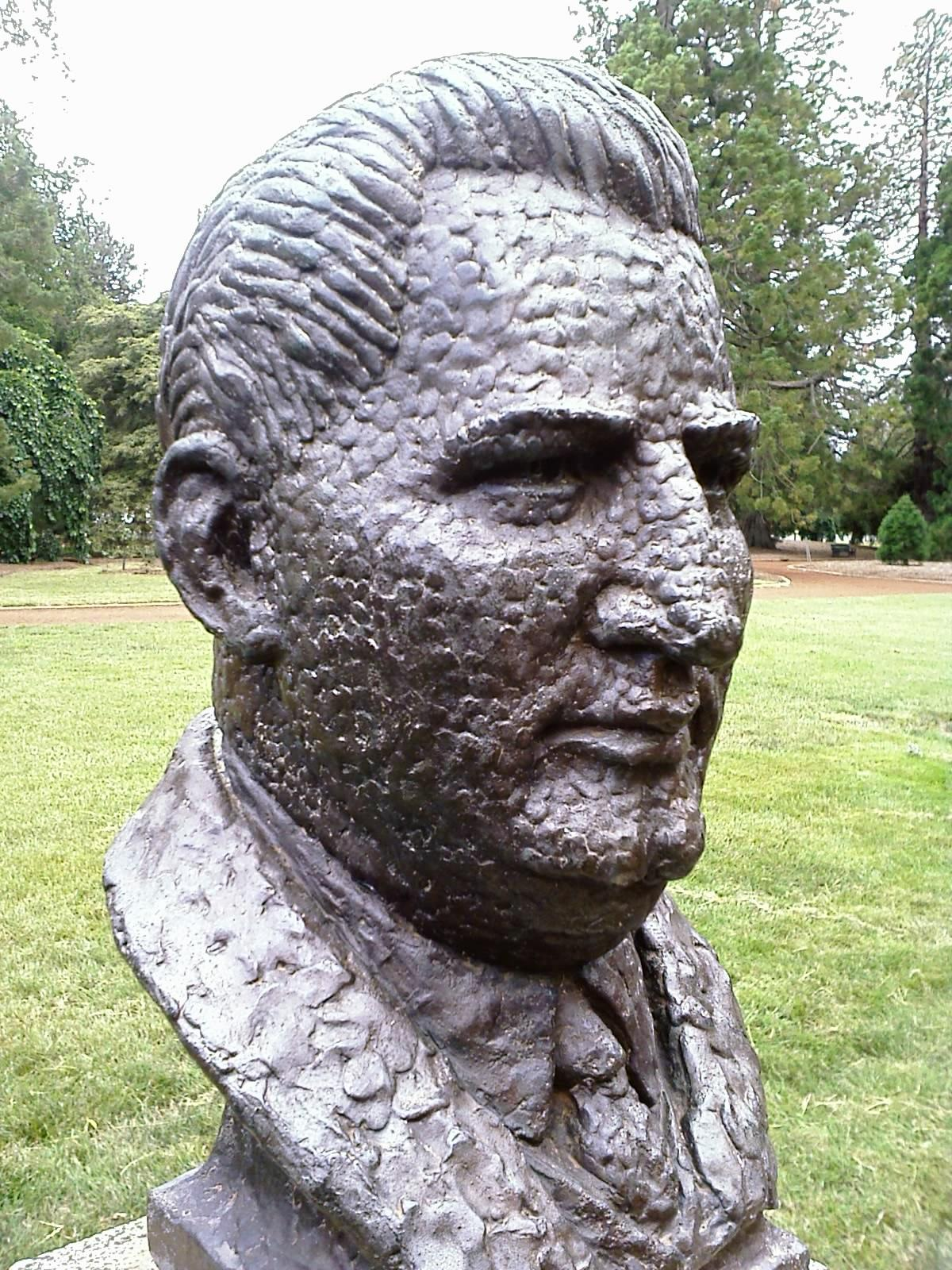
13th: Arthur Fadden

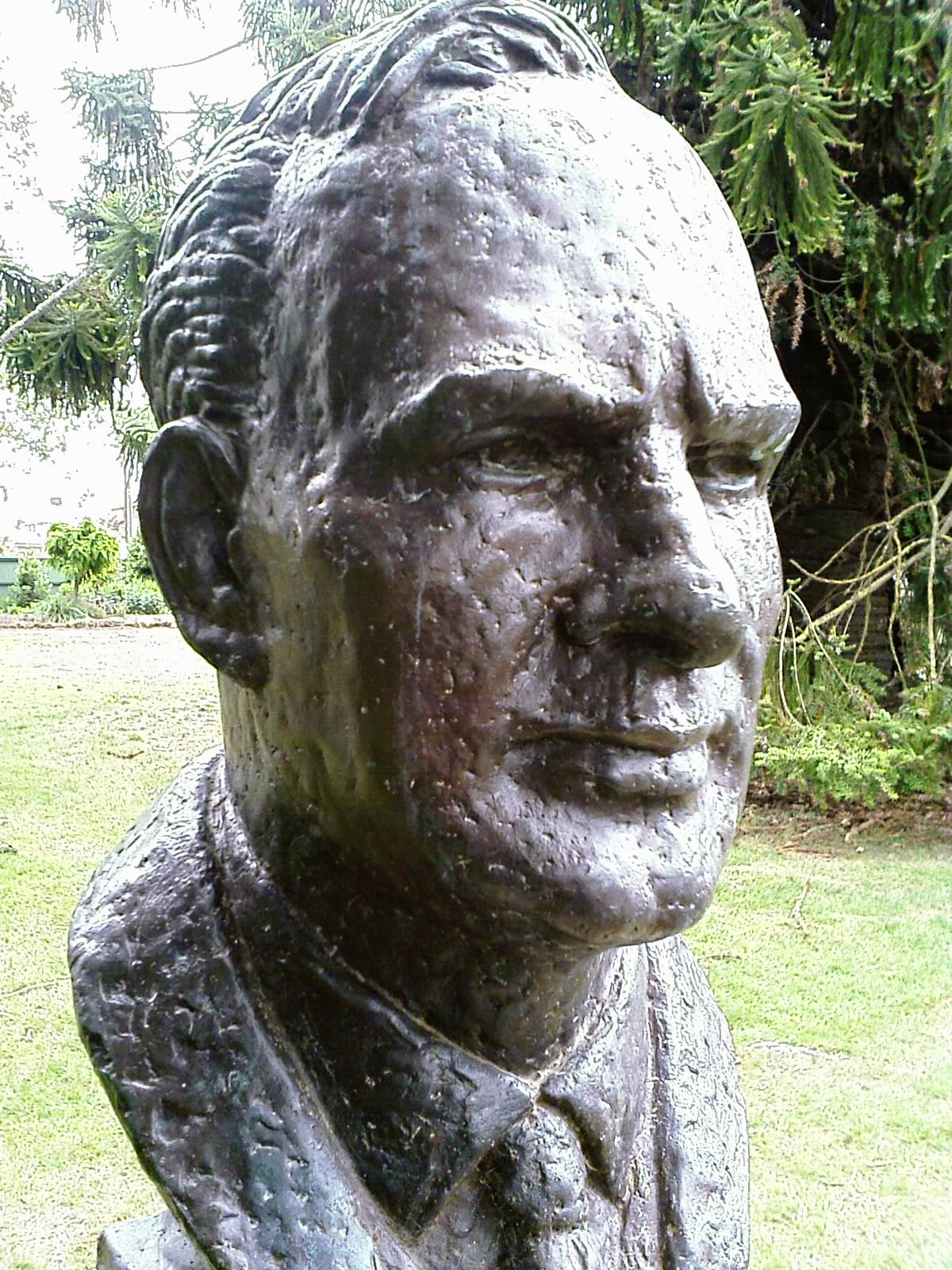
14th: John Curtin

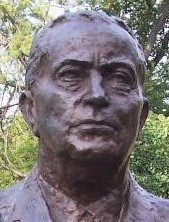
15th: Frank Forde

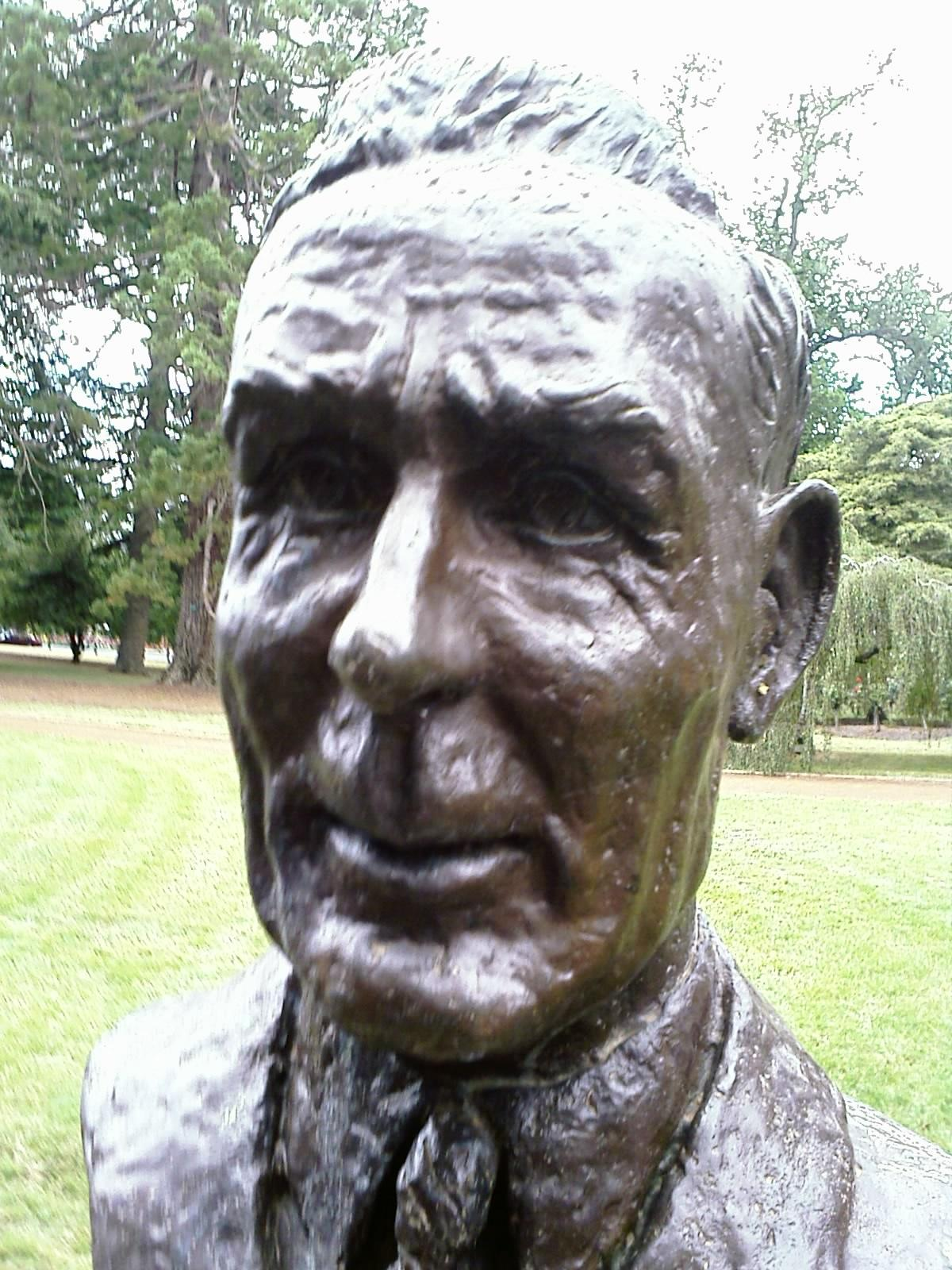
16th: Ben Chifley

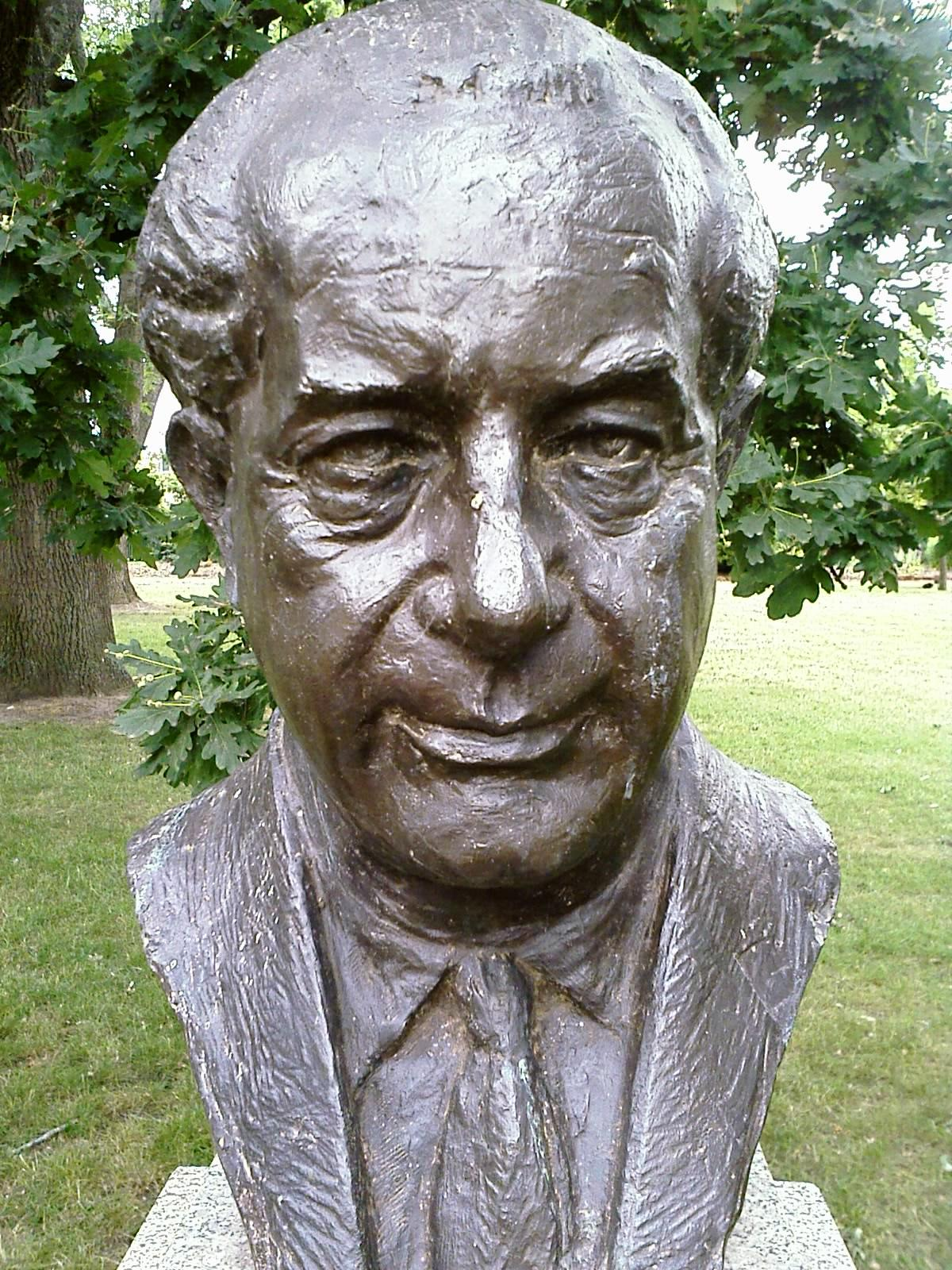
17th: Harold Holt

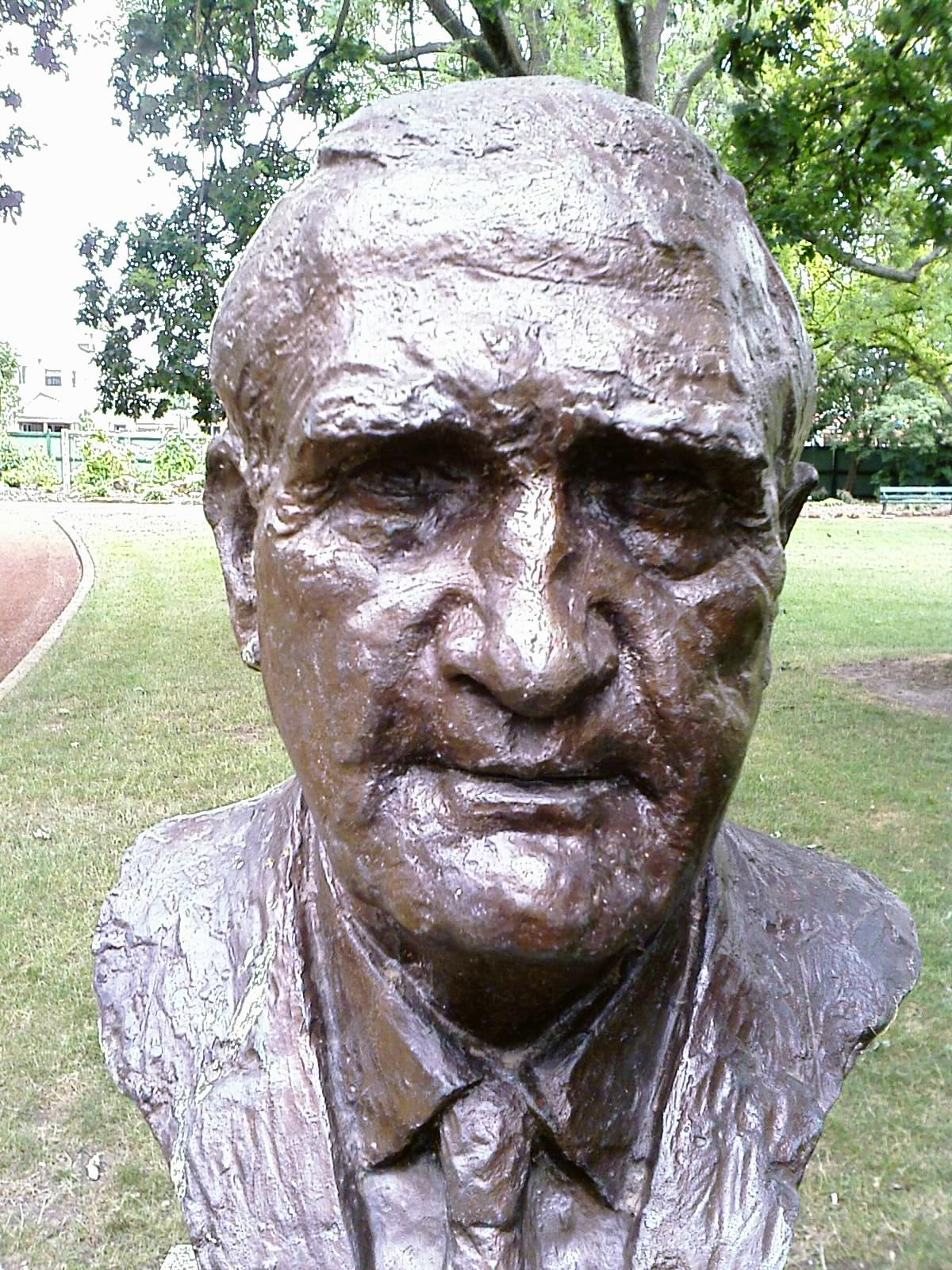
18th: John McEwen

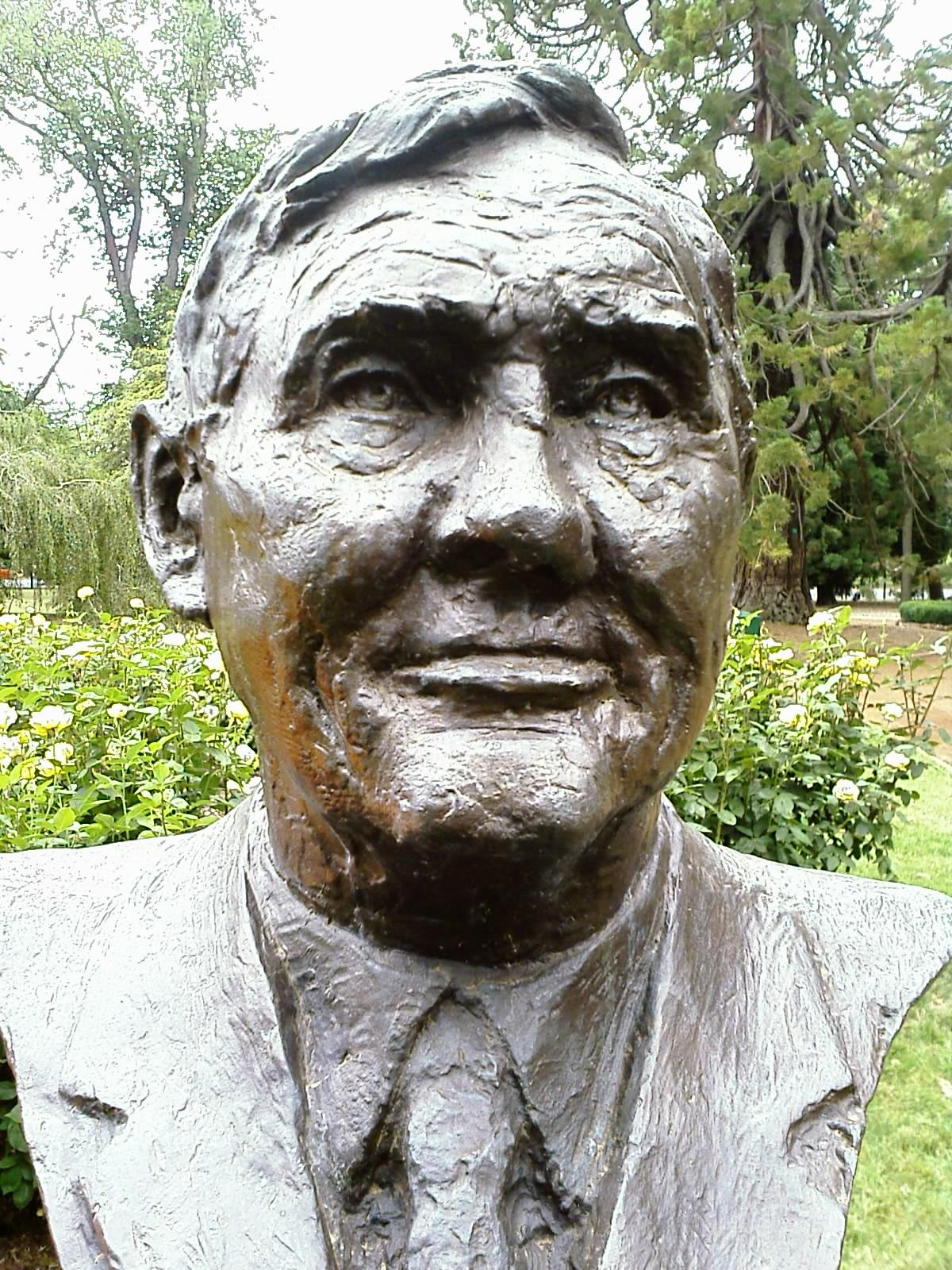
19th: John Gorton

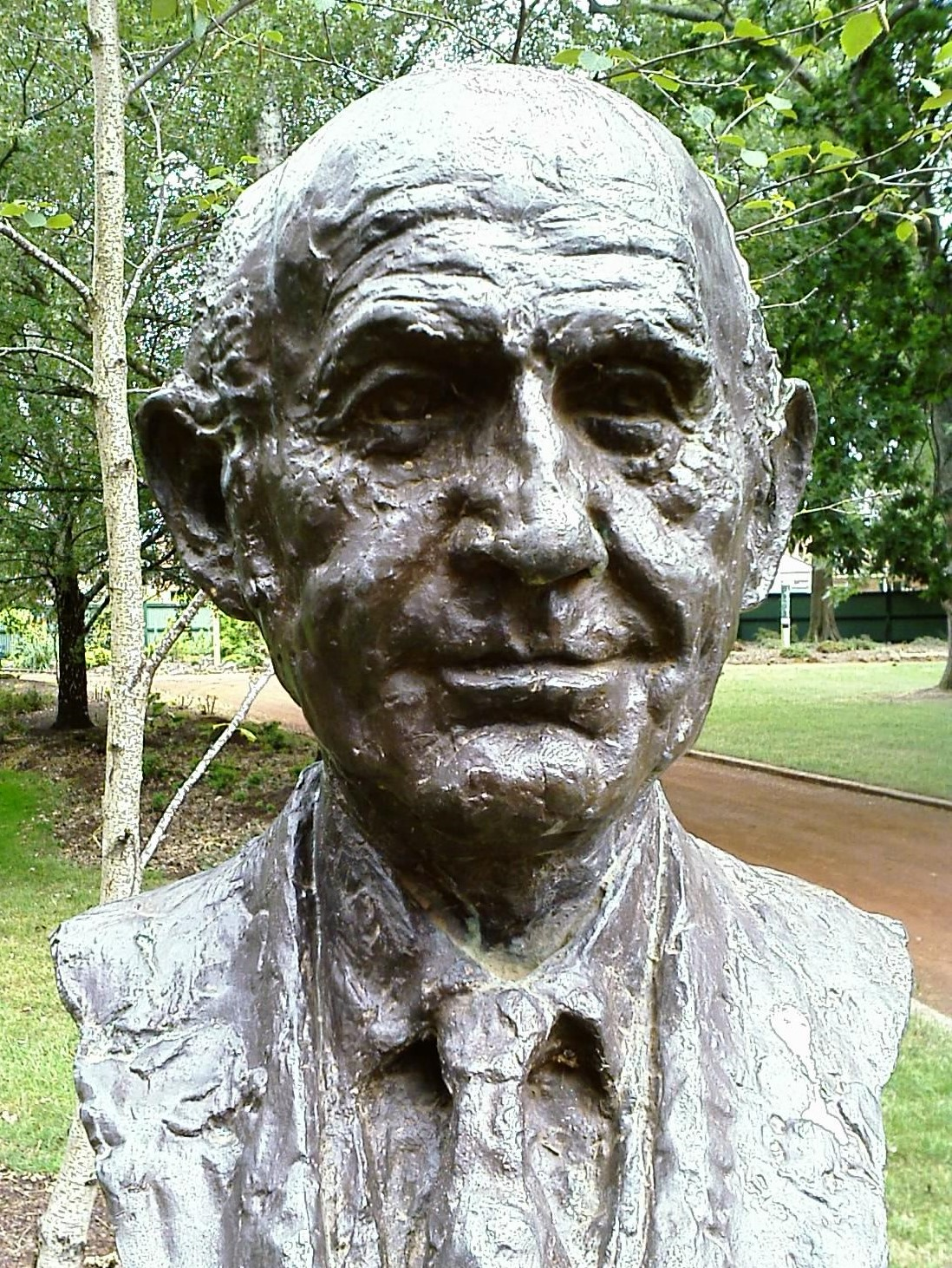
20th: Billy McMahon

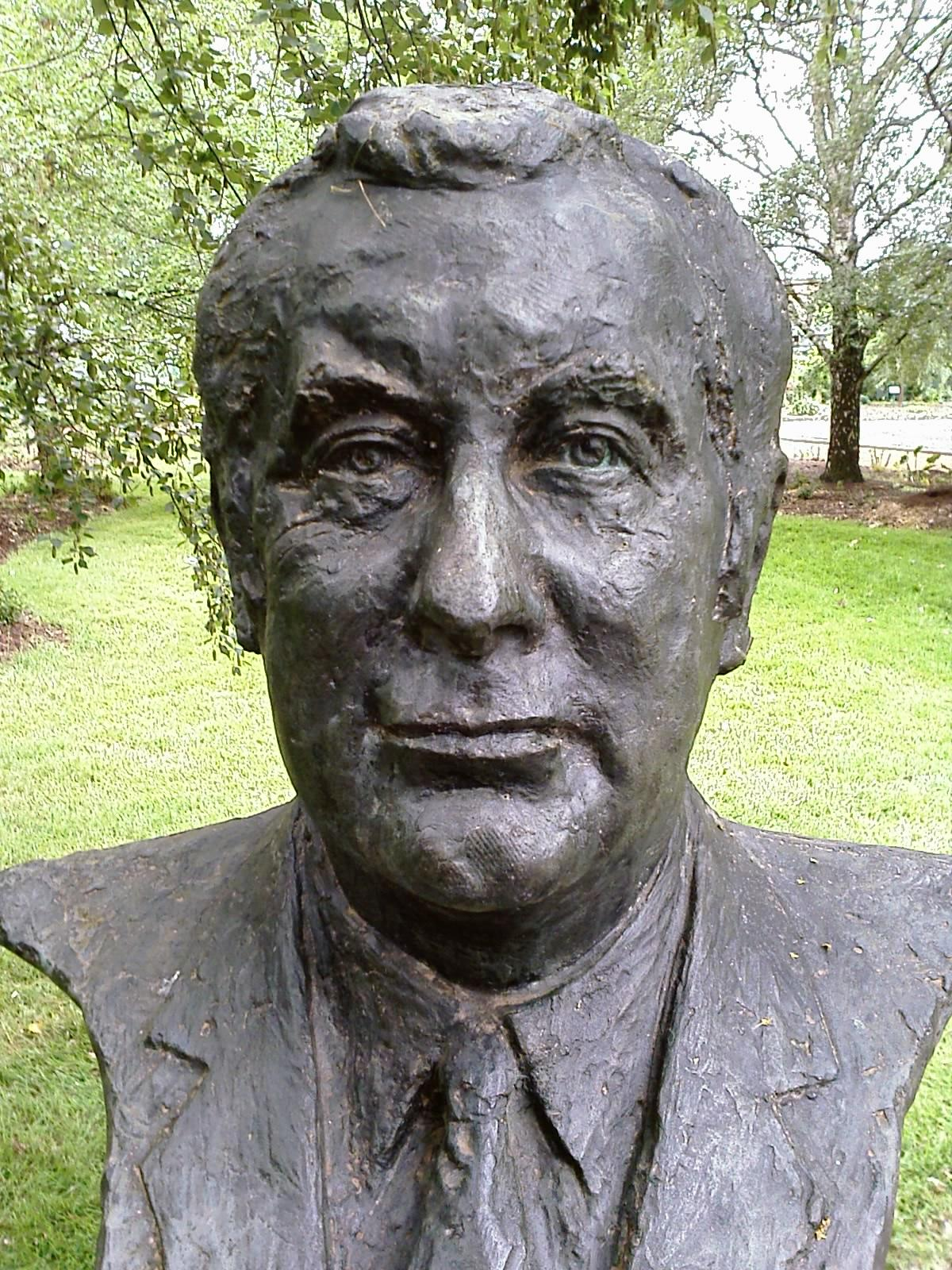
21st: Gough Whitlam

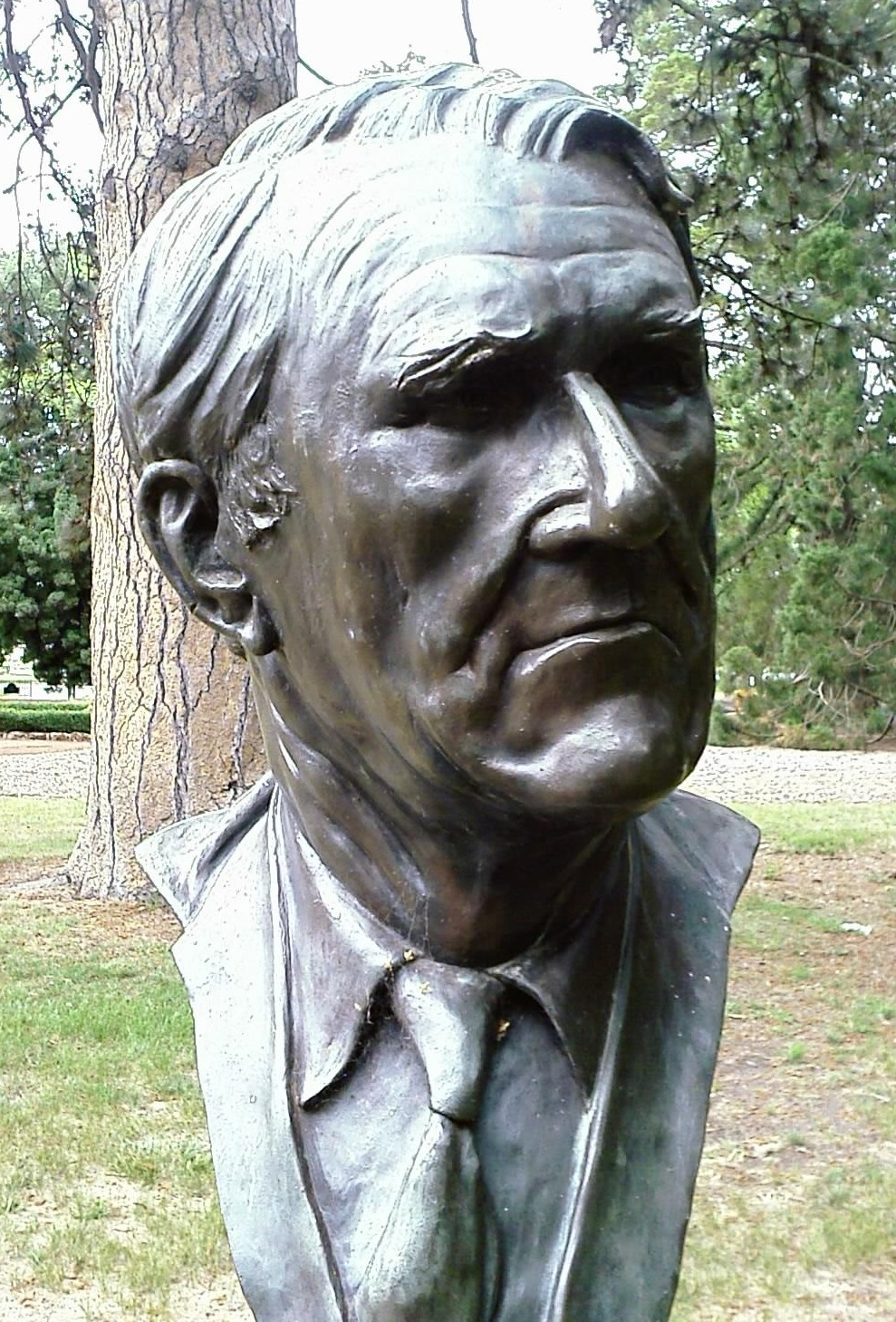
22nd: Malcolm Fraser

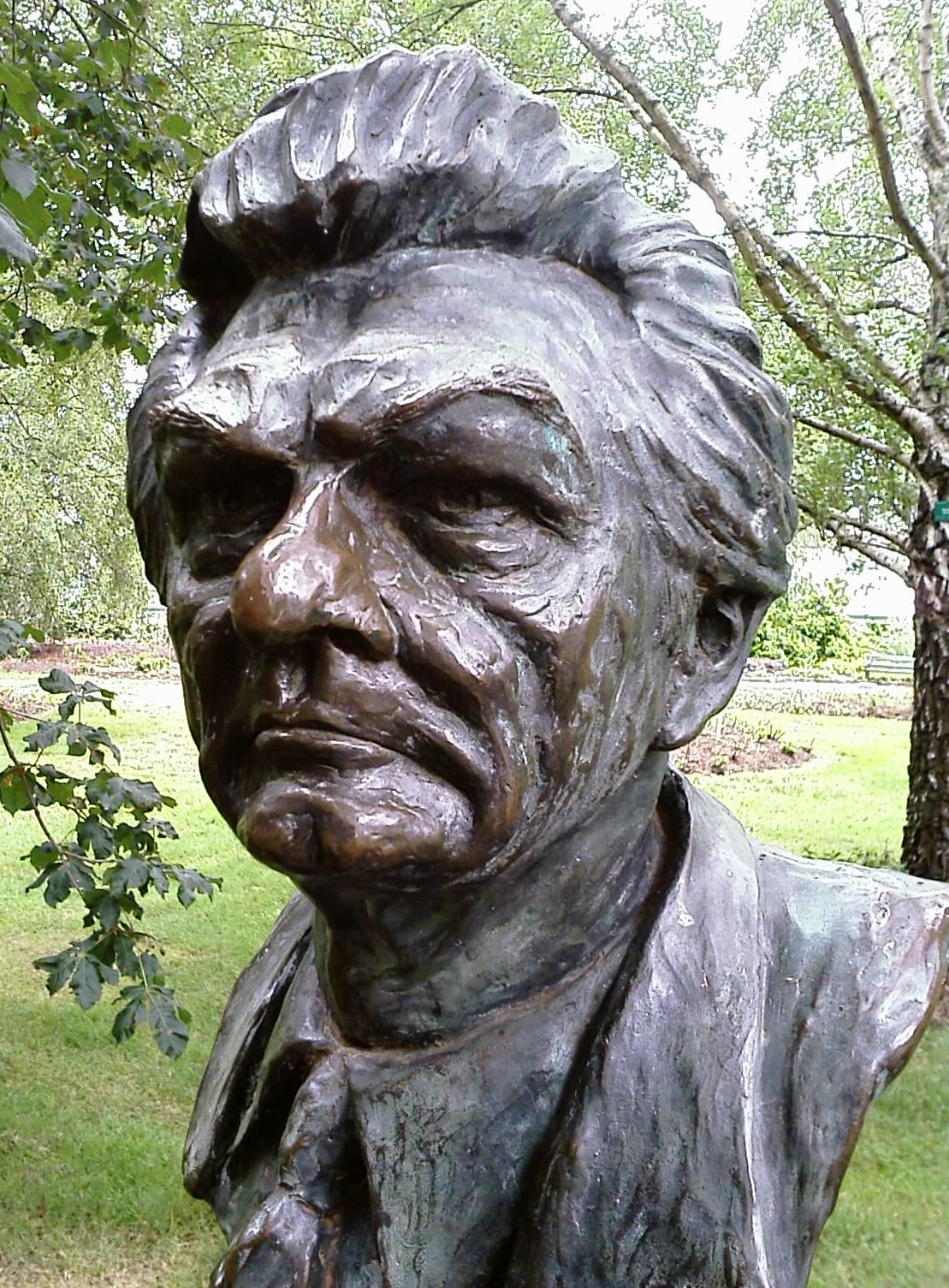
23rd: Bob Hawke

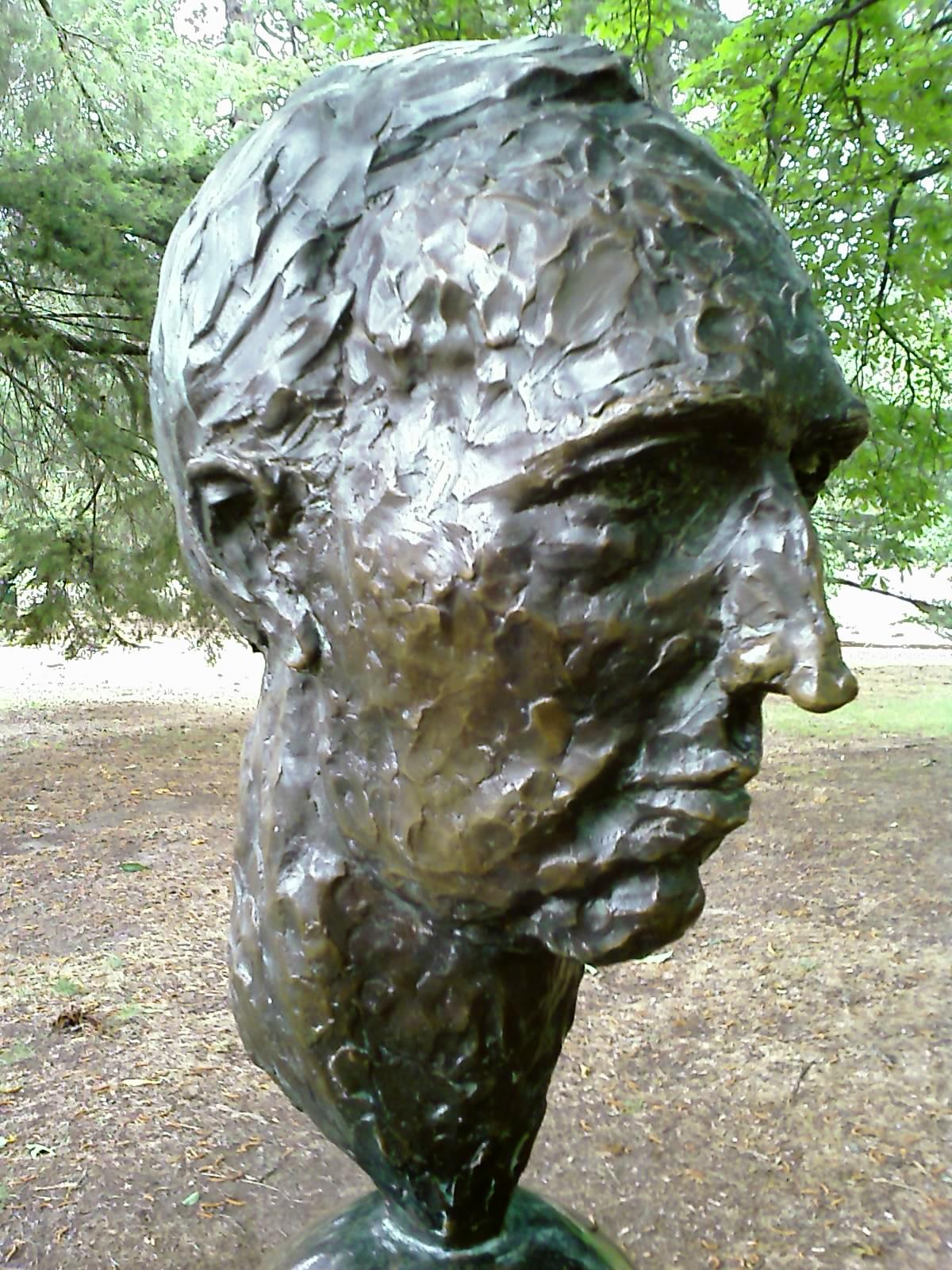
24th: Paul Keating

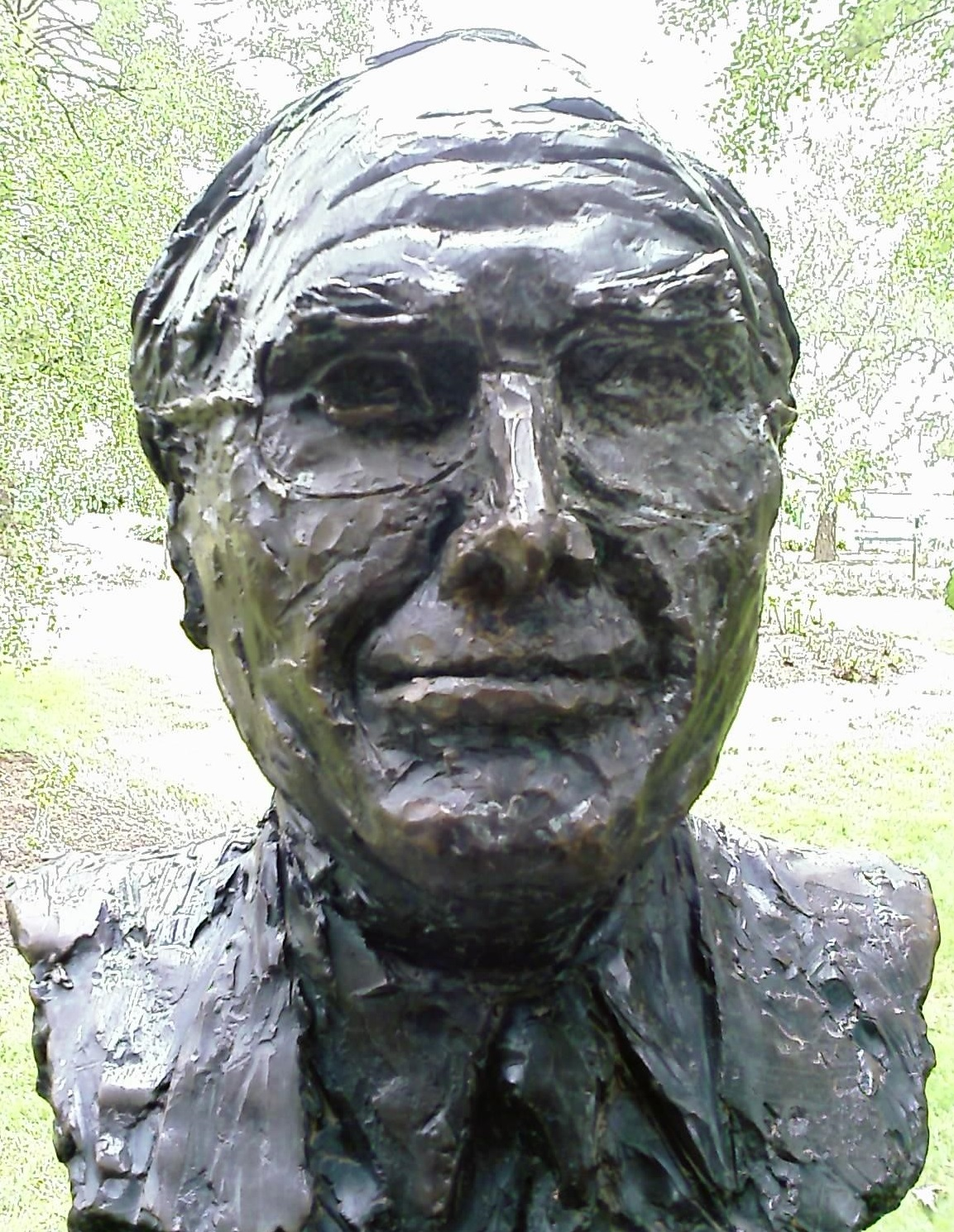
25th: John Howard

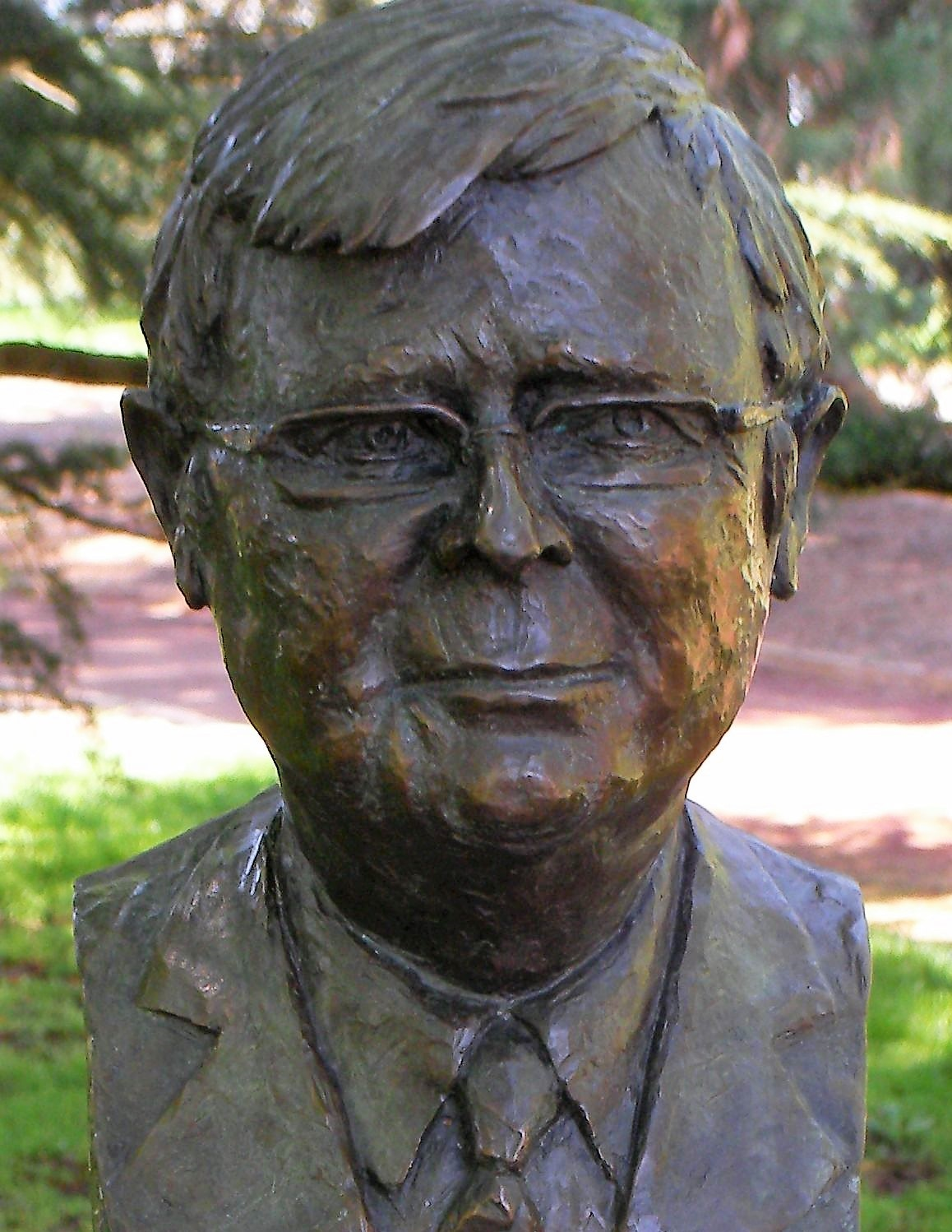
26th: Kevin Rudd

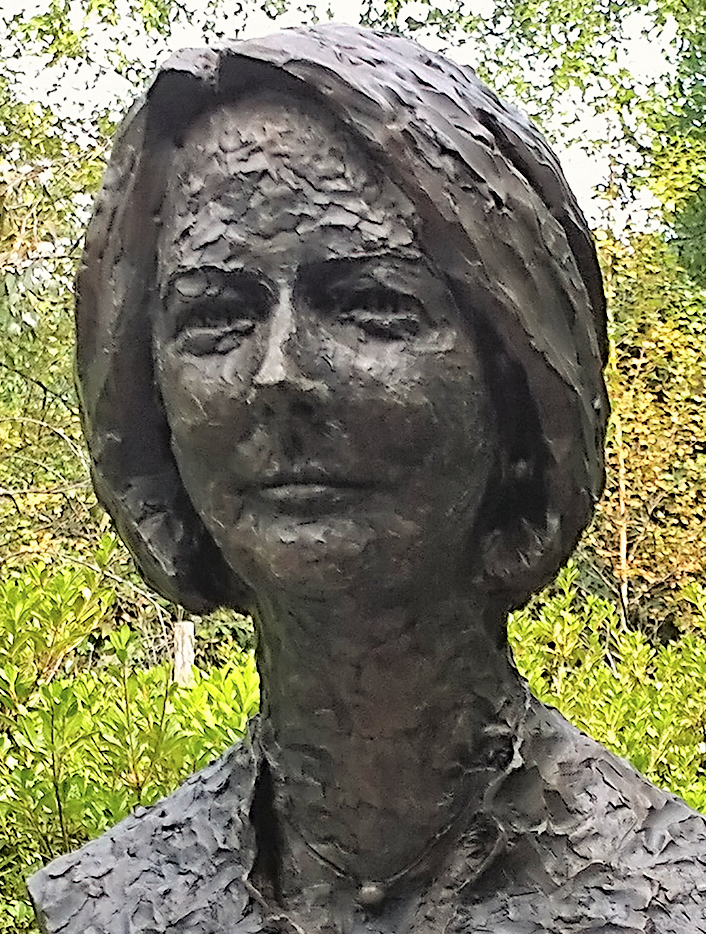
27th: Julia Gillard

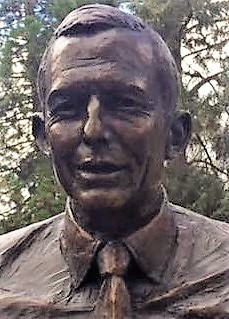
28th: Tony Abbott

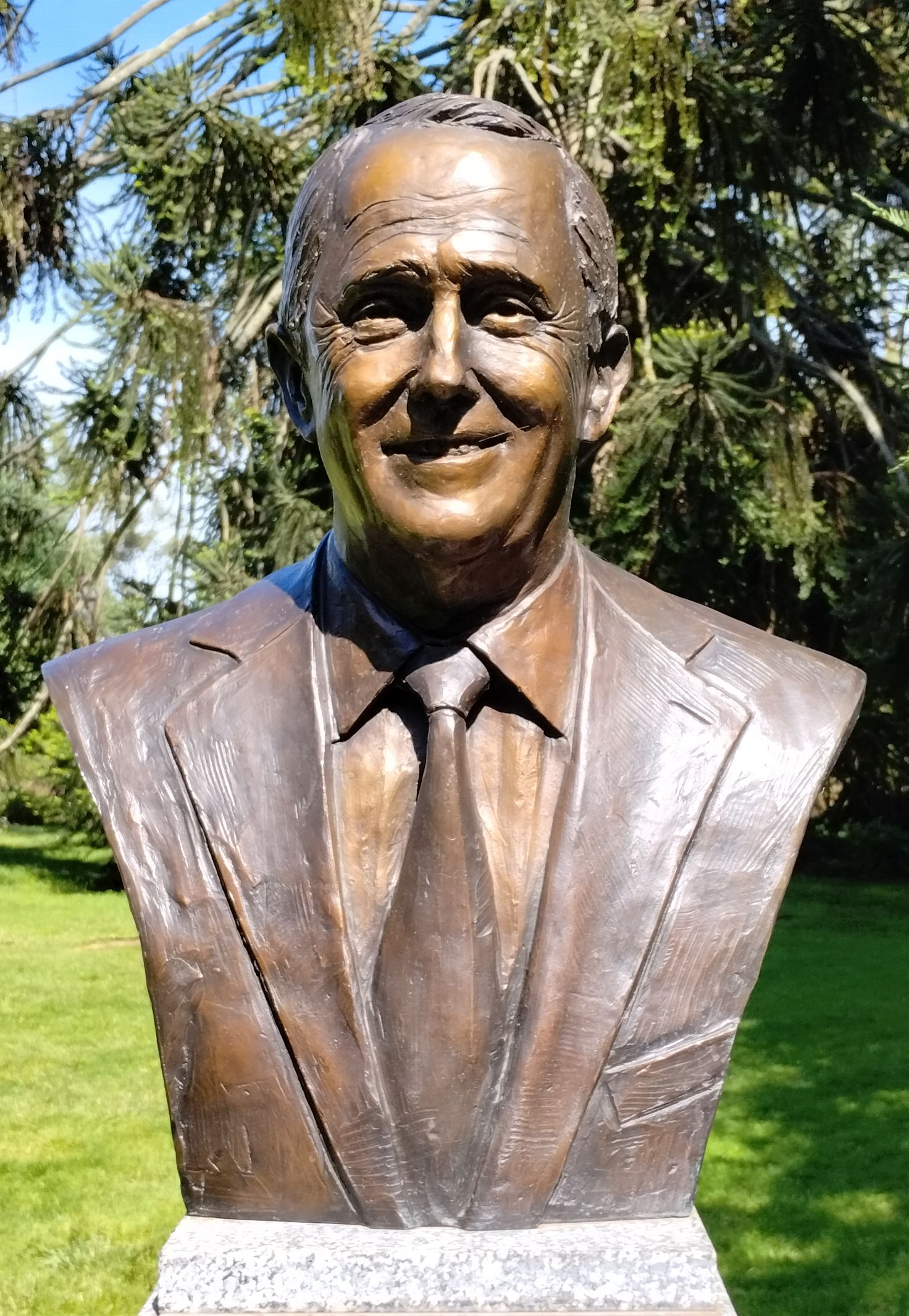
29th: Malcolm Turnbull

== See also ==
- Prime Ministers' Corridor of Oaks – Faulconbridge, New South Wales
