= Sturt Street Gardens =

Gardens in Ballarat, Australia

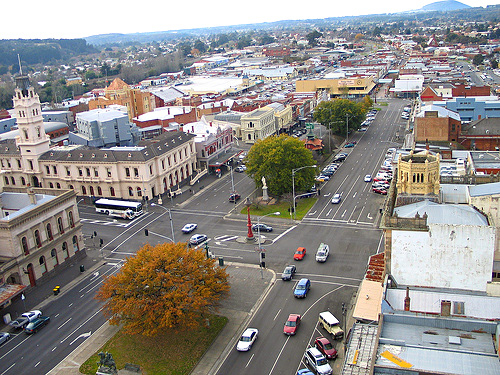
- Aerial view of the eastern part of Sturt Street Gardens looking east
- Interactive map of Sturt Street Gardens
- Type: Public park
- Location: Ballarat, Victoria, Australia
- Coordinates: 37°33′40″S 143°50′59″E
- Area: 2.87 hectares (7.1 acres)
- Operator: City of Ballarat

The Sturt Street Gardens is a central reservation running along Sturt Street, one of the main thoroughfares of Ballarat, (Victoria, Australia). The formal gardens span 13 city blocks from Grenville Street in the east to Pleasant Street in the west, are 20 metres (22 yd) wide and cover an area of 2.87 hectares (7.1 acres) running east–west.

The historic gardens are the main gardens of Ballarat's Central Business District and significant for their heritage features including significant statues, bandstands, memorials and trees. Three of the reserve's monuments are listed on the Victorian Heritage Register and the entire gardens are listed as a heritage precinct by the City of Ballarat. The gardens are important to the culture of Ballarat.

Several blocks along the gardens have individual names based on their history and features such as Queen Victoria Square and Alexandra Square.

== History ==
Sturt Street, the main boulevarde of Ballarat, was created by the first survey of the town in 1851 by WS Urquhart. In the 1860s a dual carriageway with central median strip was created.

== Victorian Heritage Register Sites ==
=== Titanic Memorial Bandstand ===
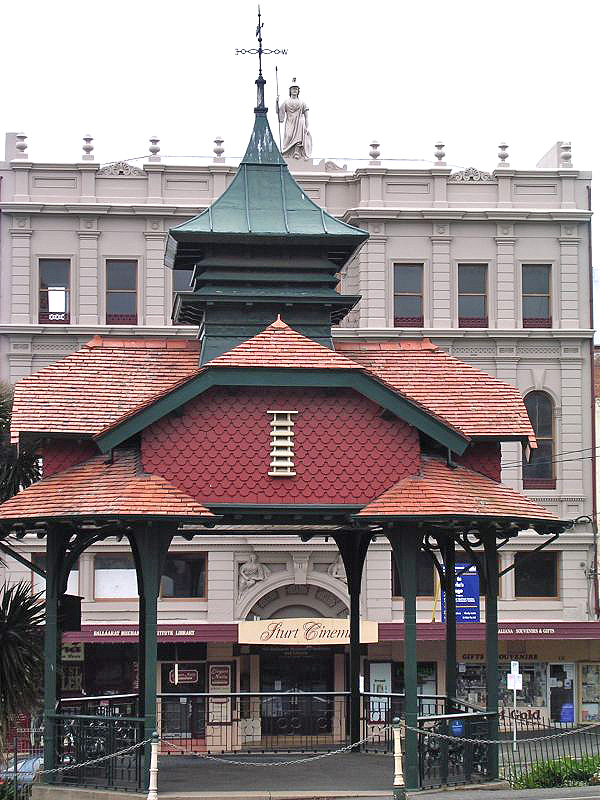
RMS Titanic Memorial in front of Mechanics Institute.

The SS Titanic Memorial Bandstand is an unusual example of bandstand design of the Edwardian period, a picturesque composition with dominant roofs of oriental character, it is an important element of the streetscape of Sturt Street.

Constructed in 1915, it is one of the few remaining examples of what was once a building type found commonly in the parks and gardens of many municipalities. It serves as a tangible reminder of a highly popular form of entertainment, prominent on the community agenda for many years. The construction of the bandstand and its survival until now also reflects the place of music in Ballarat's cultural identity and the continuing prominence of music in the community.

It is a memorial to the sinking of the RMS Titanic, a disaster still recalled today, and principally to her heroic musicians who played as they went down with their ship.

The bandstand and its construction is indicative of Ballarat's self-image and patriotic fervour.

=== Queen Alexandra Bandstand ===
The Alexandra Bandstand is a typical and well resolved example of creative bandstand design; it polygonal form surmounted by a 'Moorish' onion dome is representative of bandstands of this period. The bandstand has particularly fine wrought iron detailing incorporating musical motifs and is an important and exotic element of the streetscape of Sturt Street.

Built in 1908 during the heyday of the band movement, it is now one of the few remaining examples of bandstands in Victoria. It serves as a tangible reminder of a highly popular form of entertainment, prominent on the community agenda for many years. The construction of the bandstand and its survival until now also reflects the prominence of music in Ballarat's cultural and civic identity.

== Statues ==
Snowfall on the Petersen Fountain in September 2020.

The City of Ballarat has a walk of the statues within the Sturt Street Gardens.

The main statues in order from West to East are:

- Petersen Fountain 1923
- George Treloar Memorial 2019 Sculptor: Lis Johnson
- Mother Earth 1952 Sculptor: George H. Allen
- Peter Lalor 1893 Sculptor: Nelson McLean
- Sir Albert Coates 2000 Sculptor: Louis Laumen
- King George V Monument 1938 Sculptor: Victor Greenhalgh
- Ruth 1899 Sculptor: Charles F. Summers
- Hebe 1899 Sculptor: B. Raggi
- Thomas Moore 1889 Sculptor: George Grant
- Queen Victoria Memorial Fountain 1902, Sculptor: F. W. Commons
- Queen Victoria 1900 Sculptor Sir Edgar Bertram MacKennal
- Robert Burns 1867 Sculptor: John Udny
- Point to Sky 2002 Sculptor: Akio Makigawa

== Memorials and monuments ==
- Gordon Memorial 1969, Sculptor: Raymond B. Ewers
- Cenotaph 1949, Architect: John P. Shimmin
- Eternal Flame 1995, Sculptor: Peter Blizzard
- Korean, Borneo, Malayan, Vietnam War Memorial 2000
- William Dunstan Victoria Cross Memorial 2000
- King George V Monument 1938, Sculptor: Victor Greenhalgh
- Phoenix Foundry Plaque
- Queen Victoria Memorial Fountain 1902, Sculptor: F. W. Commons
- Boer War Memorial 1906, Sculptor: James White
- Burke & Wills Fountain 1867
- SS Titanic Memorial Bandstand 1915, Architect: G.W. Clegg
- Pioneer Miners Monument 1951
- James Galloway Monument 1880

== Gallery ==
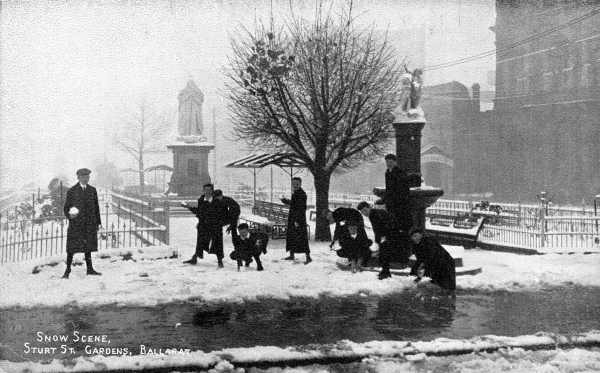
Snow scene in Sturt Gardens in 1905.

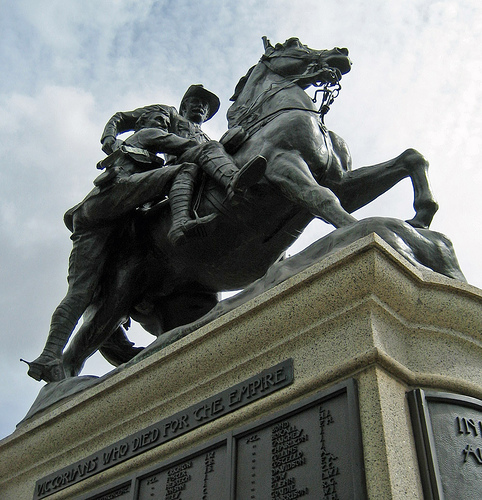
Boer War Memorial.

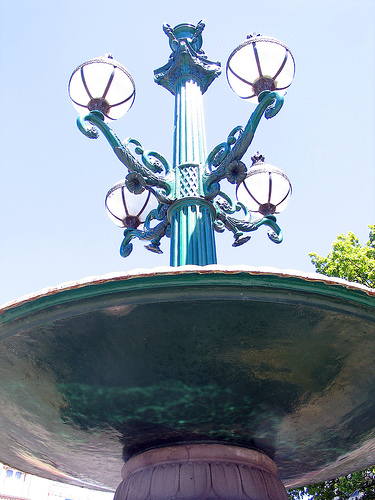
Burke and Wills Fountain.

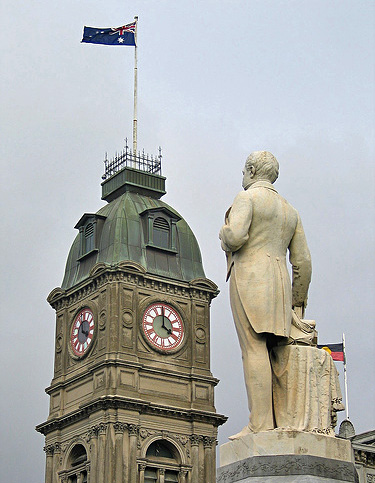
Thomas Moore Statue and the Ballarat Town Hall.

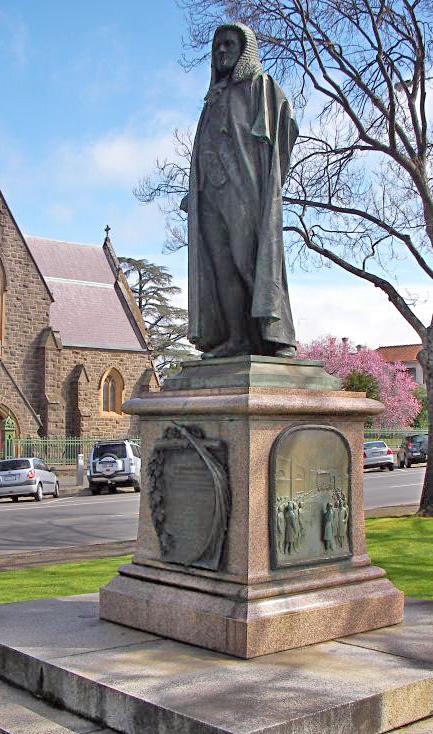
Peter Lalor Statue.

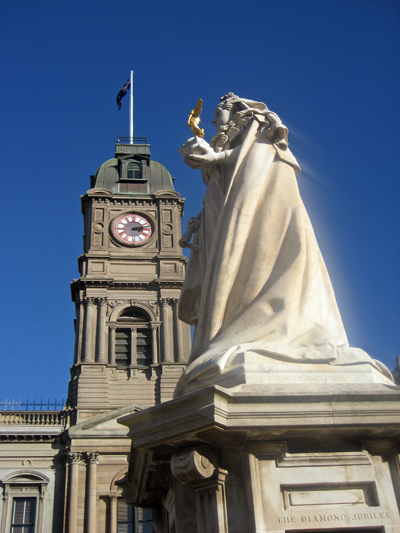
Queen Victoria Statue.
