= Victor Greenhalgh =

Australian sculptor

Victor Greenhalgh (1900–1983) was an Australian sculptor and teacher. He was commissioned to sculpt the King George V statue in Ballarat, Victoria, as well as eight of the portrait busts of Australian prime ministers which line the "Avenue of Prime Ministers" (aka Prime Ministers Avenue) in the Ballarat Botanical Gardens.

== "Avenue of Prime Ministers" in the Botanical Gardens in Ballarat ==
Although eight busts were commissioned, not all appear on the avenue. For example, Greenhalgh was critical of the final casting of his bust of Malcolm Fraser, and after his death it was replaced by a new bust created by Peter Nicholson.

The eight busts include:

- Sir Robert Menzies KT AK CH LLM QC (1894 – 1978)
- Rt. Hon. Harold Holt (1908 – 1967)
- John McEwen (1900 – 1980)
- Sir John Gorton GCMG AC CH (1911 – 2002)
- Sir William McMahon CH GCMG PC (1908 – 1988)
- Gough Whitlam (1916 – 2014)
- Malcolm Fraser (1930 – 2015)

The five busts which appear on the Avenue are:

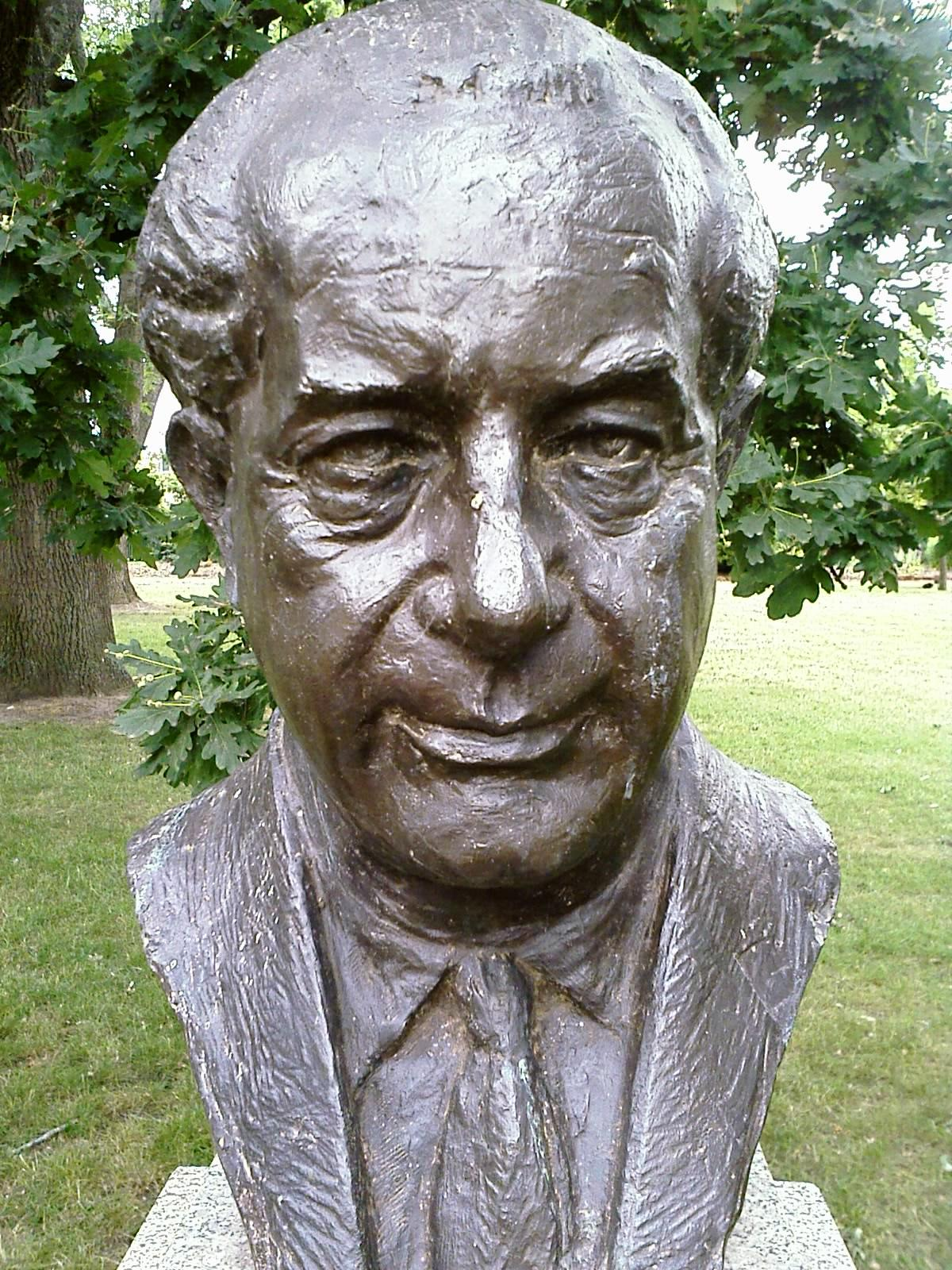
17 Harold Holt

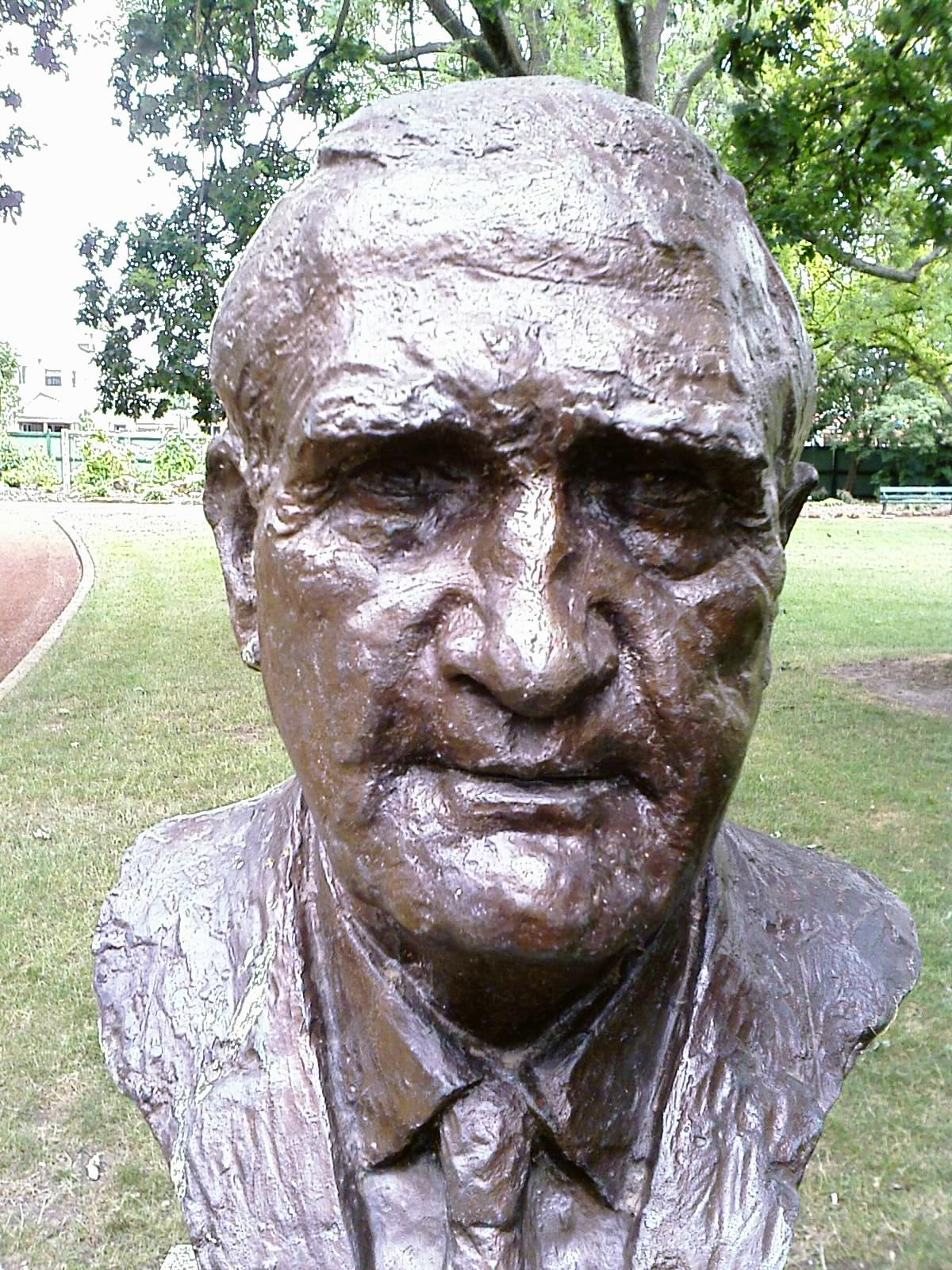
18 John McEwen

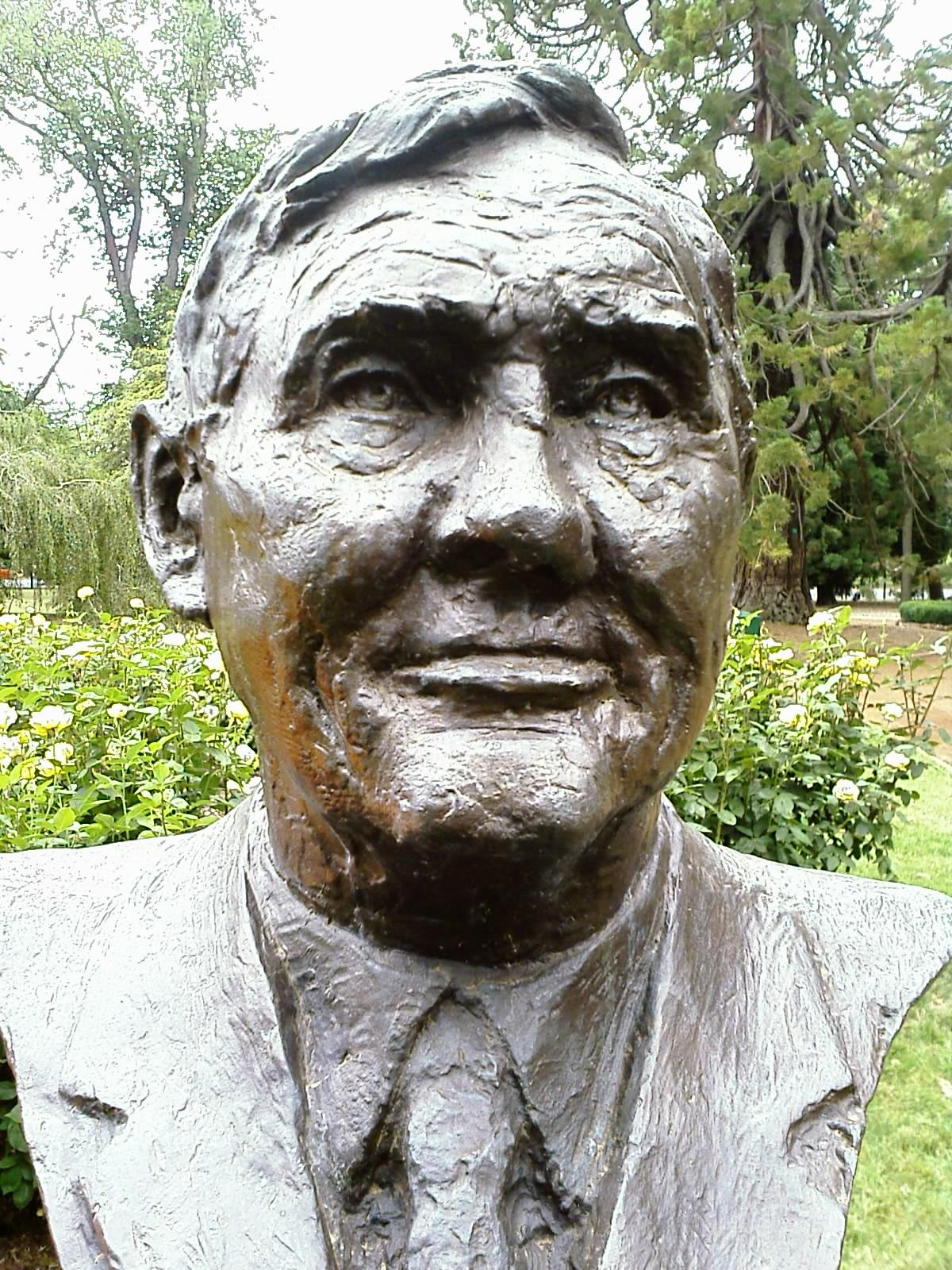
19 John Gorton

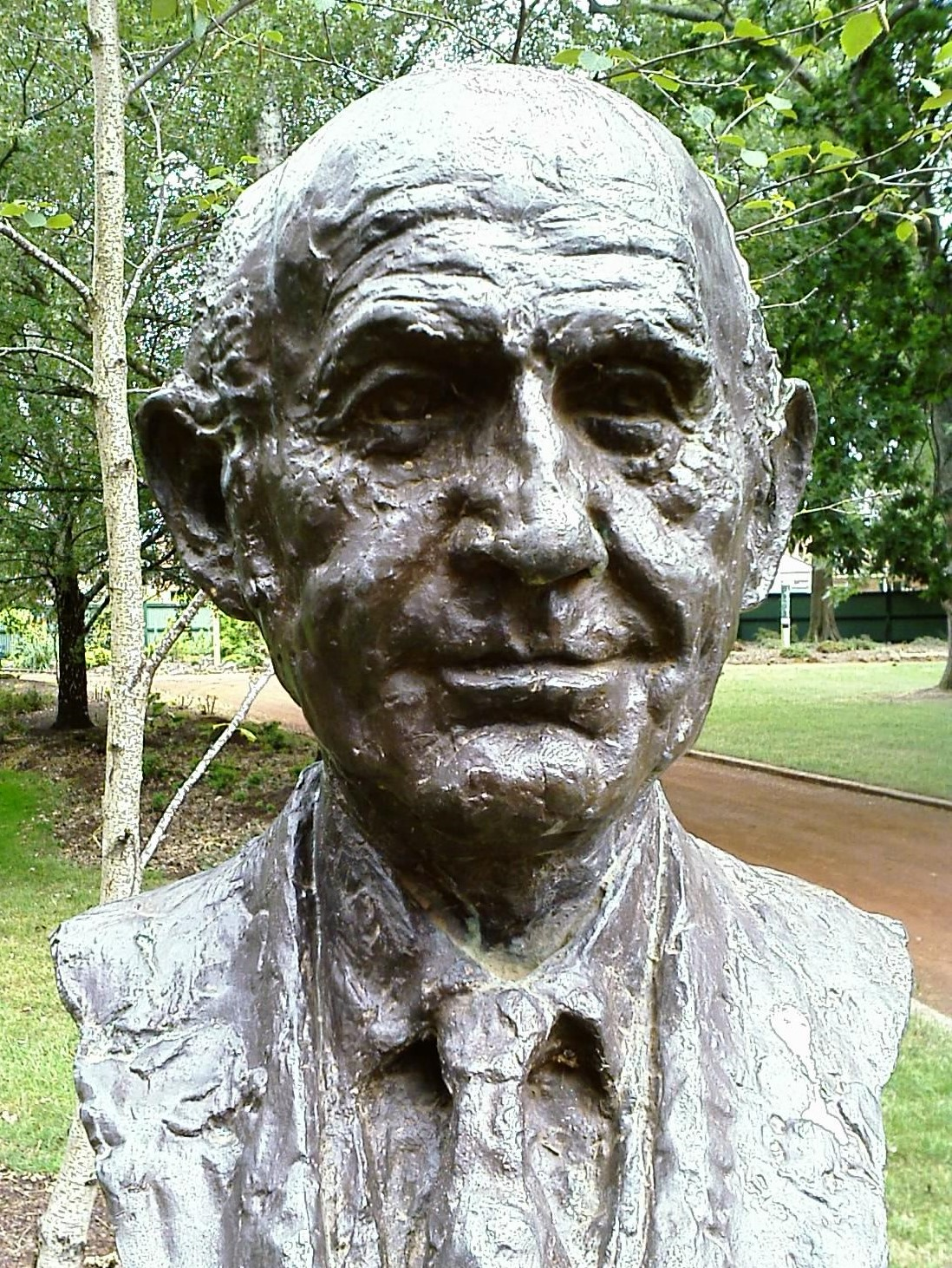
20 William McMahon

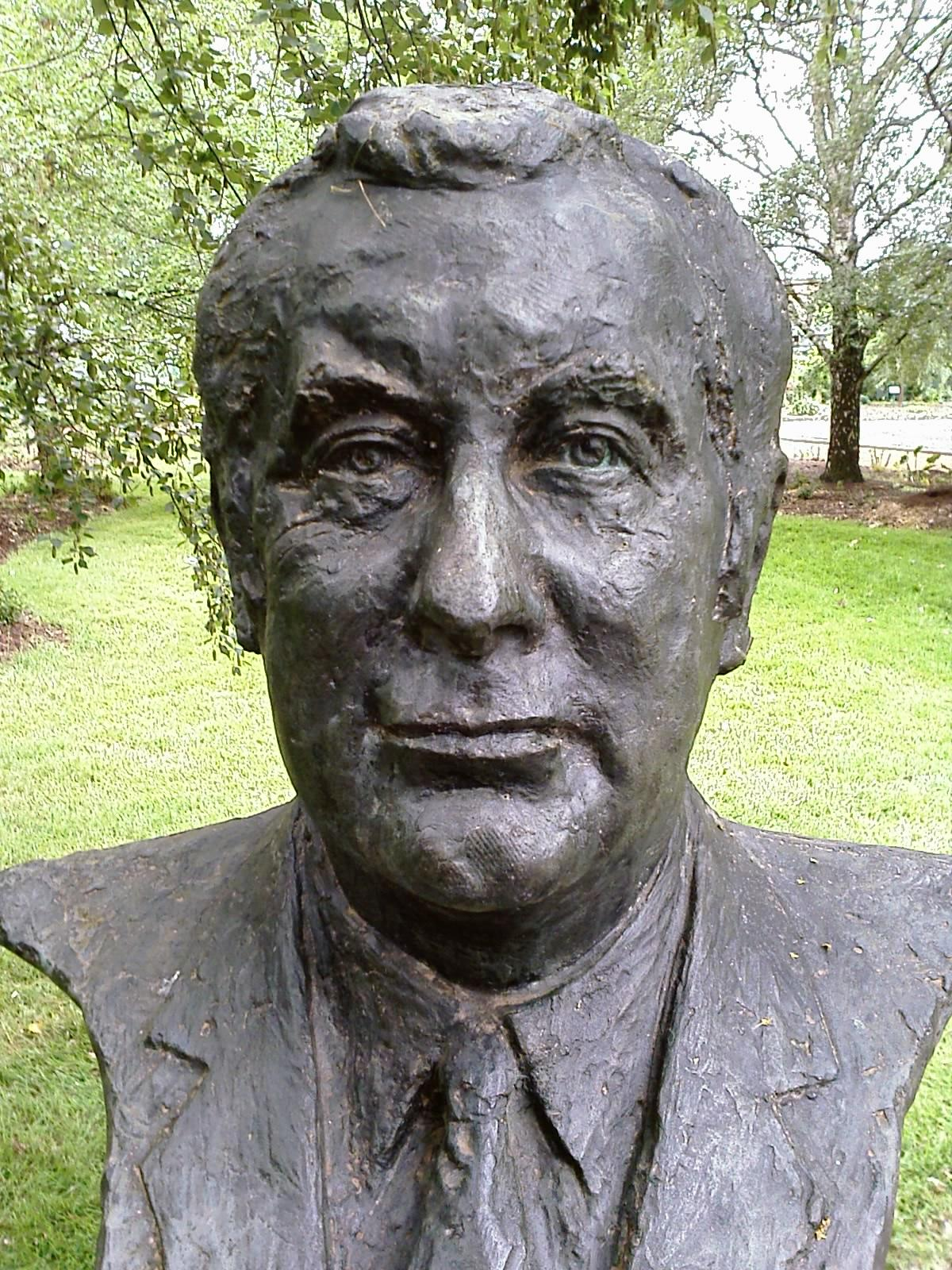
21 Gough Whitlam

== Other Art works ==
- Bust of Dick Richards
- Marquette of Gough Whitlam
- Martin-Weedon commemorative plaque
- Mother and child

== Educational achievements ==
Greenhalgh was head of the department of Advertising Art at RMIT. Bob Isherwood established the Victor Greenhalgh scholarship programme for underprivileged students at RMIT in his name.
