= Ballarat Botanical Gardens =

Botanical garden in Victoria, Australia

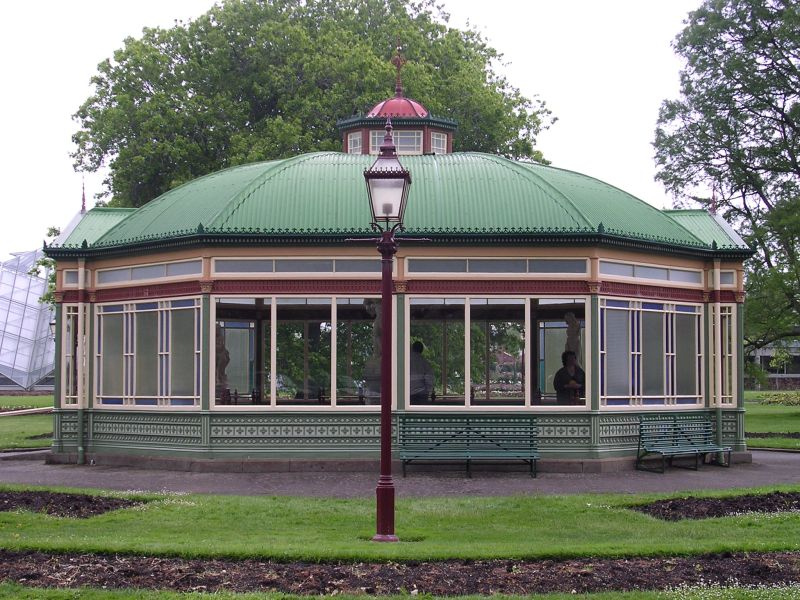
- Statuary pavilion in Ballarat Botanical Gardens
- Interactive map of Ballarat Botanical Gardens
- Type: Botanical
- Location: Ballarat, Victoria
- Coordinates: 37°32′48″S 143°49′20″E
- Area: 40 hectares (99 acres)
- Opened: 1857
- Owner: City of Ballarat

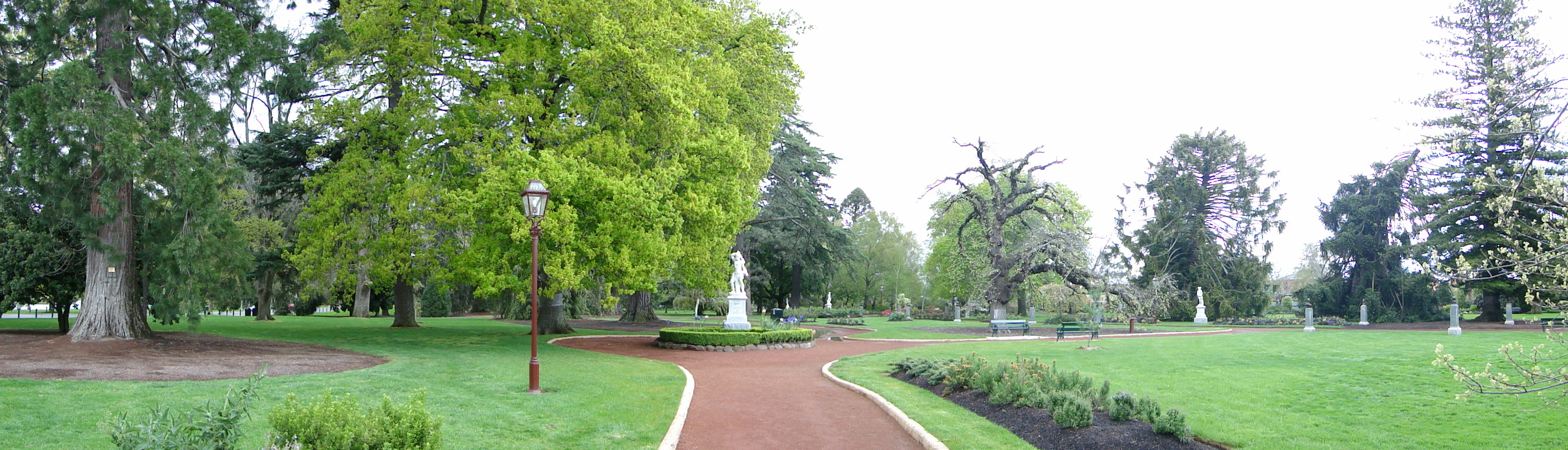
Ballarat Botanical Gardens

The Ballarat Botanical Gardens Reserve, located on the western shore of picturesque Lake Wendouree, in Ballarat, Victoria, Australia, covers an area of 40 hectares which is divided into three distinct zones. The central Botanical Gardens reserve in the 'gardenesque' style of the Victorian pleasure garden. On either side there are open parkland buffers known as the North and South Gardens. The Gardens celebrated its sesquicentenary (150 years old) in 2007. Renowned fly fishing author Alfred Ronalds provided some of the first trees and plants for the gardens from his nursery on the other side of the lake.

== Features ==
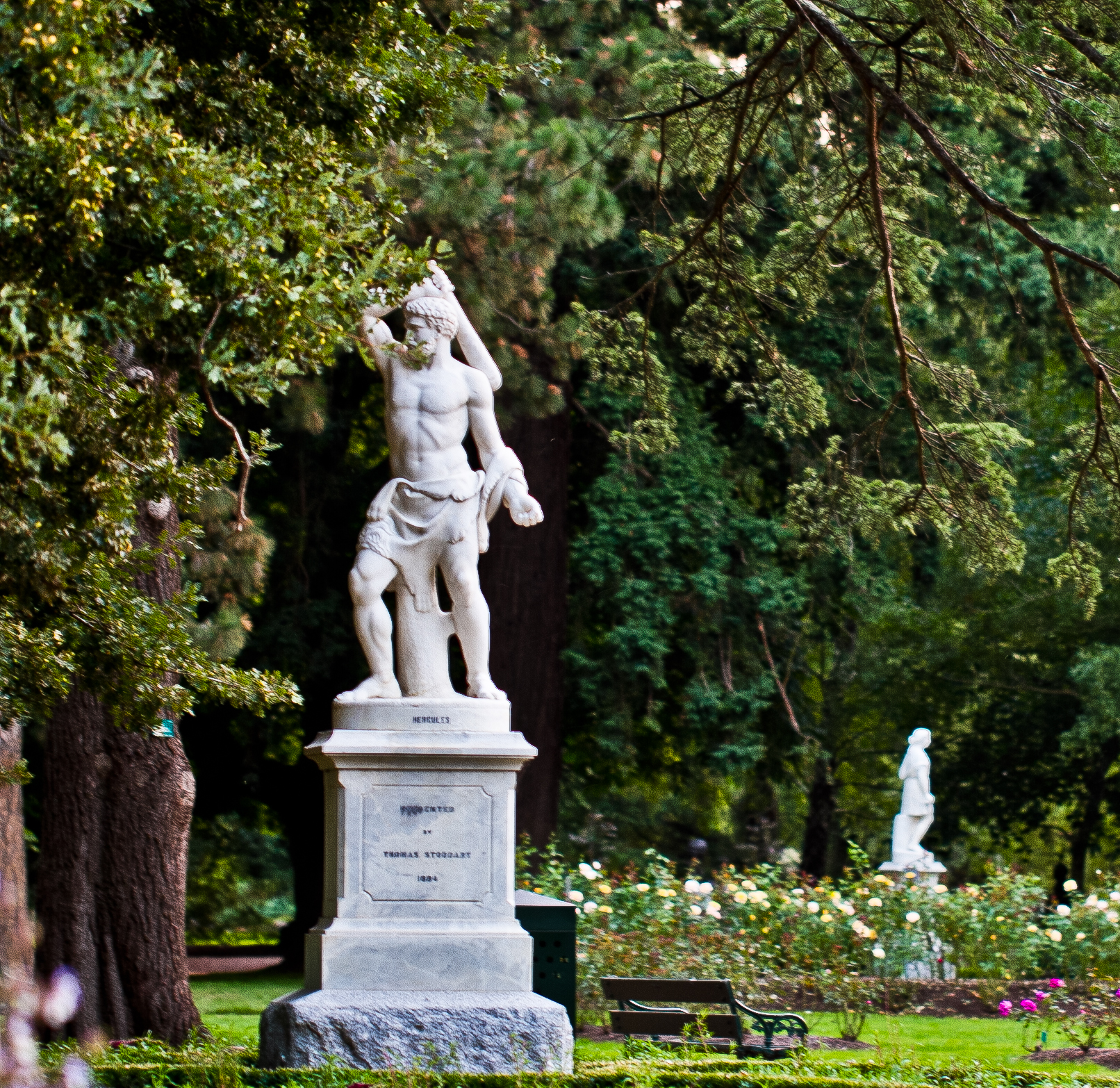
Hercules statue at Ballarat Botanical Garden

The gardens feature a large modern conservatory, returned Ex-POW war memorial, and the heritage statuary pavilion. The Stoddart Statue collection consists of 12 white marble figures from Italy donated by Thomas Stoddart in 1884. The 12 statues were figures from classical mythology: Spring, Summer, Autumn, Winter, Hercules, Pomona, Bacchante, Hebe, Flora Farnese, Leda, Mercury and Flora. They were badly damaged by vandals in 2002 and were placed in the statuary pavilion after repair. The statues were returned to their original 1884 pedestals in March 2010.

A collection of bronze busts of all Australian Prime Ministers named Prime Ministers Avenue is set within Horse Chestnut Avenue. One of the founding fathers of Federation was Alfred Deakin who was the first Federal Member for Ballarat and the second Prime Minister. The first 12 busts, by Wallace Anderson, were donated by Richard Crouch who also left a bequest to add further busts.

The South Gardens has Australia's Ex Prisoner of War Memorial, opened on 6 February 2004. Designed by Ballarat artist Peter Blizzard, the 130-metre long granite wall has the names of 35,000 Australian Prisoners of War etched into it.
