= The Grange (home) =

The Grange was a historic home, located at 804 or 808 Lydiard Street North, Soldiers Hill, Victoria in the gold rush City of Ballarat, Victoria, Australia. The house no longer exists, and the only indication of its existence is an eponymous court development where the subdivided property is now occupied by houses and townhouses.

Soldiers Hill, which was named after the Colonial Forces of Australia stationed there prior to the Eureka Rebellion in 1854, was one of the first planned suburbs of Ballarat and was considered one of Ballarat's premier addresses. Soldiers Hill "...has a substantially intact Victorian era architectural character, with many of its buildings featuring an abundance of period detail including distinctive decorative cast iron ornament."

The Grange was weatherboard, built on brick piers standing on large bluestone foundations. It featured decorative scalloped woodwork along the eaves; decorative lattice on the entrance porch; extensive lattice work on the verandah, which stretched across the northern and western sides of the house; and a slate roof. The house had five bedrooms, a "middle room" which had a variety of uses, and a "breakfast room" which was the dining room and the place the family gathered. The formal lounge room was used as a "receiving room’ rather than somewhere that had general family use.

Separate to the house was a stand-alone building known as the "groom’s room". There was no indication of stables or other facilities for horses when the Darling family moved there in 1908.

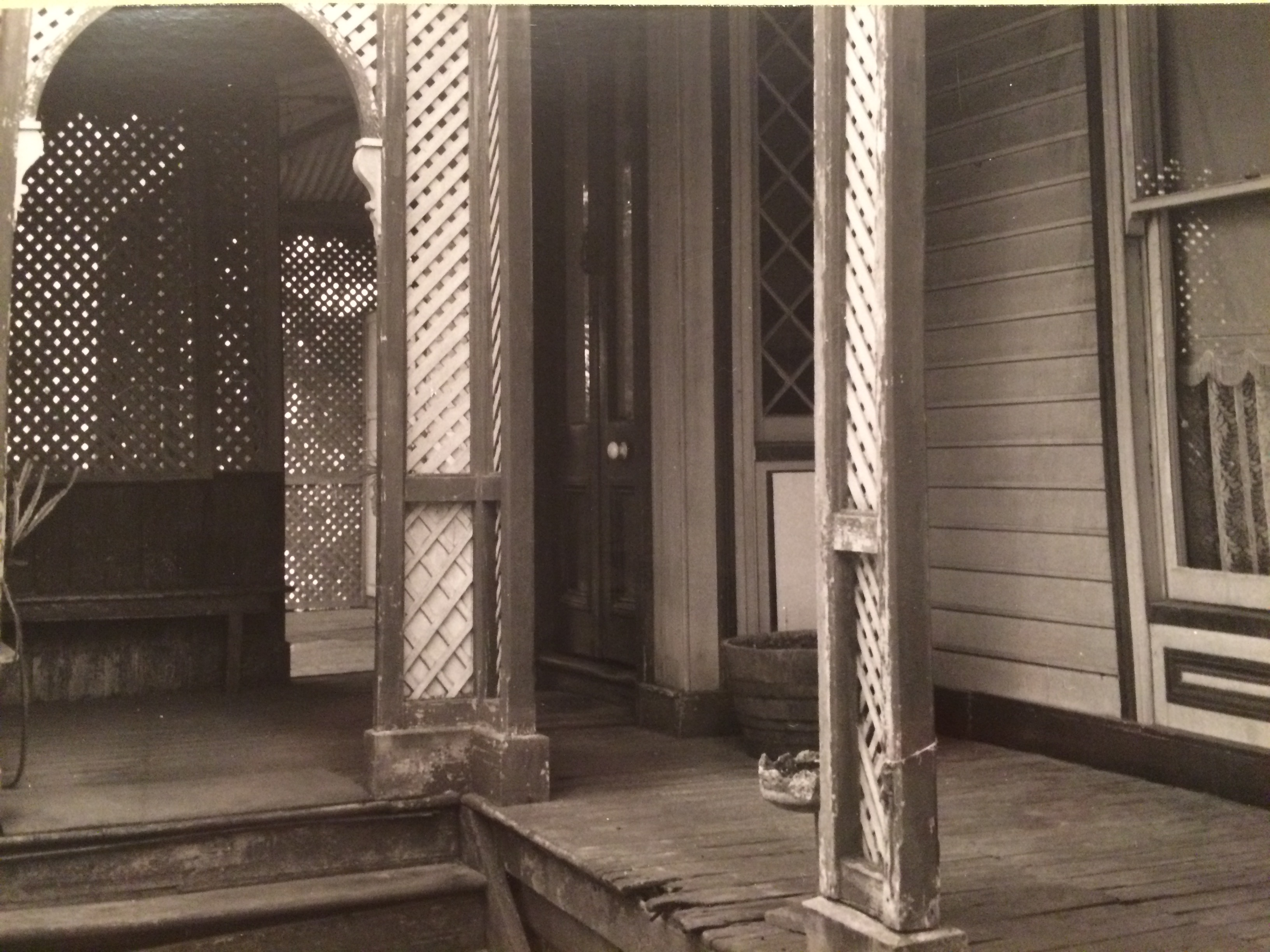
Entrance porch of The Grange

== History ==
=== John Taylor ===
The original purchaser from the Crown of the land that The Grange was to stand on was made in August, 1862 by J. Taylor who bought two adjoining allotments which combined to an area of 1 acre 3 roods and 8 perches, with a 265 feet west facing frontage on Lydiard Street North, Soldiers Hill. These allotments, 11 & 12, had a depth of 265 feet from Lydiard Street.

This was part of significant sales of Crown land in Soldiers Hill, and the land for what were to be a number of gracious heritage homes, such as Eyres House, Trelawny, Linlithgow, and many more, was purchased during these early 1860s sales.

As J. Taylor or John Taylor seems to have been quite a common name in Ballarat during this period, it is difficult to specifically identify him. Mrs. John Taylor had a daughter in October 1863, at Lydiard Street North, Soldiers Hill, but it has not been possible to clarify her relatives.

Other purchasers of land during the Crown Land Sales at Soldiers Hill during this time were generally quite eminent Ballarat citizens, so it seems reasonable to assume that "J.Taylor" was also. To be able to pay £90 for the purchase of land was a significant amount at this time.

In July 1863, a year after purchasing the land, John Taylor, butcher, raised a substantial mortgage of £1,200, using the land as part surety.

A month later, he paid Walter Elliott £13 for a 15’ wide driveway to provide direct access for his property to Gregory Street, and this driveway continued to provide access up until 1973 when the property was subdivided.

By 1865, Taylor was in major financial difficulties and an indenture over all his assets was granted to two of his creditors, William Baron Lethbridge, and to William Eaglestone, who had rights to the adjoining property that faced Gregory and Ligar Streets.

=== James & Andrew Bridges White ===
John Taylor had raised a mortgage in 1863 on the property through a number of parties, including James White and his brother, Andrew Bridges White, who were financial merchants in Geelong, Victoria. In part satisfaction of the money owing by Taylor to the White Brothers, the property was sold to them, subject to the mortgage, for £200. £200 being deducted from the money owing, and it seems that Taylor still owed £82/12/6 to the Whites.

The White brothers, operating as the firm Messrs. Holmes, White & Co., had substantial holdings, including a run, "Glenhu", estimated at 2,800 acres in the East Wimmera and an estate of 29,602 acres in the County of Borung. The firm “… established one of the largest squatting and mercantile houses in the Western District …”.

The White's firm, Holmes, White & Co., also held the title to a "stone store" in Lydiard Street in Ballarat West which was occupied by Taylor, and valued at £600 approx.

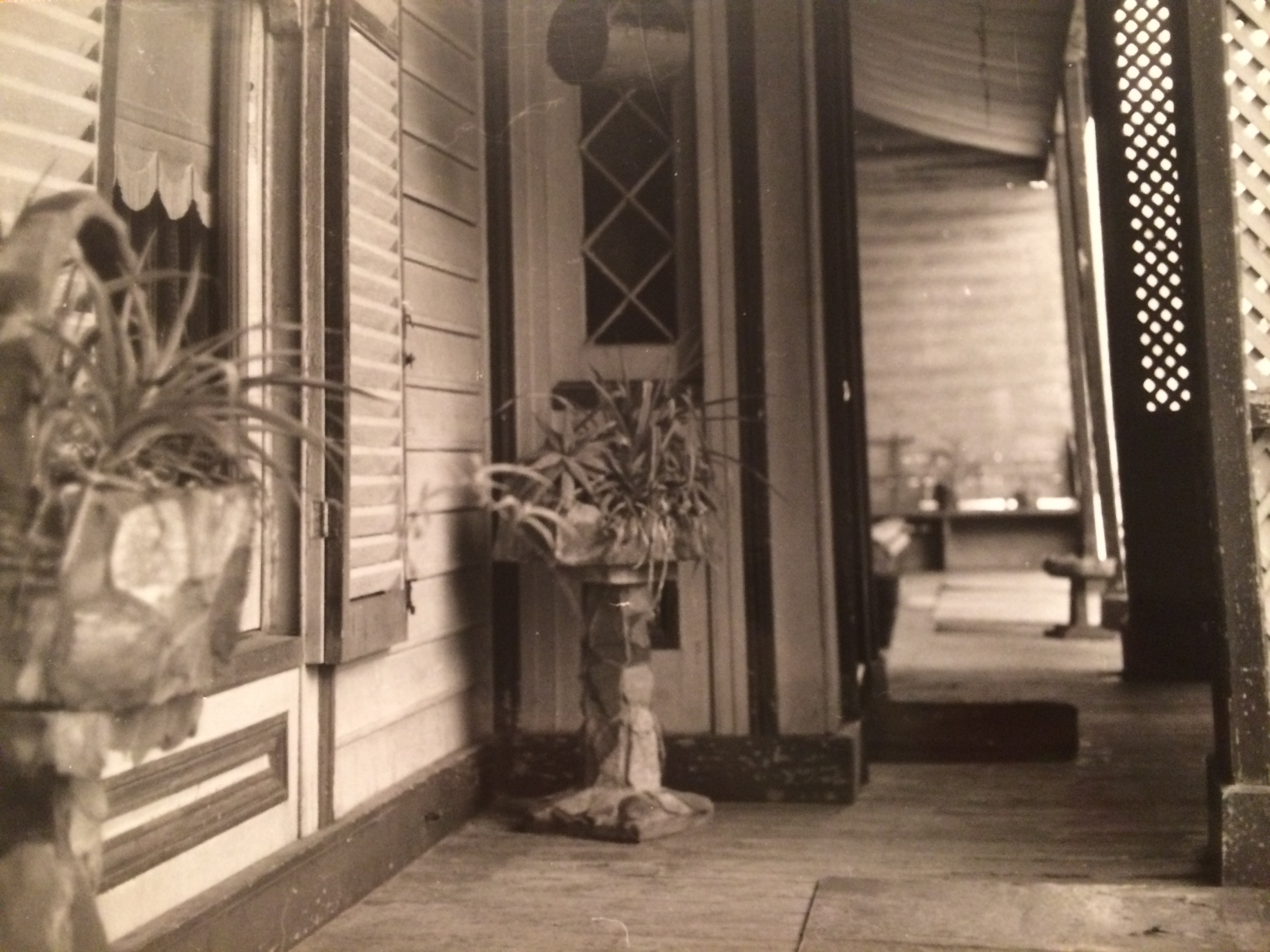
Verandah of The Grange

=== Bank of Victoria ===
In October. 1878, brothers Andrew Bridges White ( 1821–1879) & James White sold the property to Bank of Victoria, probably to realise the value of their mortgage.

Andrew Bridges White (~1821-1879) died the following year in April 1879, aged 58. An agency arrangement and failure of the Scottish bank, the City of Glasgow Bank “… embarrassed the firm, and the anxiety caused by this event no doubt hastened Mr White's death.”. His estate was valued for probate at “… not exceeding £3.10.0 …”. It would seem a reasonable assumption that this amazing collapse in his financial position was due to the impact of the ill-advised Scottish agency arrangement Strangely, not many months later in October 1879, his firm, which had been in liquidation since November 1878, was appealing against a Land Tax assessment on “… their estate of 29,602 acres …” However, this may have been an attempt to lessen the firm's debts.

The Bank of Victoria held the property for 12 months and then sold The Grange to Joseph Forshaw.

=== Joseph Forshaw ===
Englishman, Joseph Forshaw (~1831–1905) was a well-known investor, President of the Ballarat Gas Company, and a director of various leading mining companies in the Ballarat area. In October 1879 he purchased the property from the Bank of Victoria for £475 and owned The Grange up until his death in September 1906.

In the 1880s Soldiers Hill had become a favoured place of residence for Ballarat's middle and upper classes with the city readily accessed by tramway.

Joseph and his brother John Forshaw, were both miners, and had initially gone from England to Canada and the United States to try their luck, before deciding to come to Australia. They sailed from Liverpool, England on the "Miles Barton" and arrived in Melbourne, Victoria in July 1853. As with many immigrants of that period, it is likely they was motivated by the lure of the Victorian gold rush, and Joseph's time in Ballarat would seem to provide some confirmation.

In 1862 he married Mary Jane Birt (1844–1924) in Ballarat. She was from Neath in Glamorgan, Wales and, with her parents and siblings, had also immigrated to Australia, arriving in Melbourne in June 1849 on the British Empire. Mrs. Forshaw ran a school at the house.

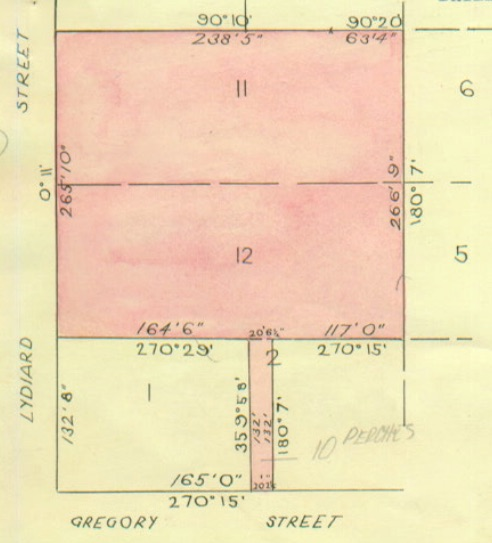
Map of The Grange 1963

Joseph Forshaw was a well known Ballarat investor, and chairman of the Ballarat Gas Works right up until his death in 1905, His neighbours, father and son Samuel and Samuel Ernest Figgis, who resided at nearby "Trelawny" in Havelock Street, Soldiers Hill, held similar senior positions in the Ballaarat Gas Company.

Joseph Forshaw had also been a director and chairman of a number of Ballarat gold mining companies, including the Robin Hood; the New Lothair, United Hand In Hand and Band of Hope, and Great Gulf gold mining companies.

Additionally, he was a director of the Ballarat Banking Company, committee member of the Ballarat Permanent Building & Investment Society, and was involved in various charitable activities. He was also a Life Member of the venerable Ballarat Mechanics Institute.

Forshaw and his wife Mary had seven children, four girls and three boys, when they moved into "The Grange", and had another child, Florence "Florrie" Blanche Forshaw, born in 1888, whilst residents there.

In 1880, Forshaw purchased part of the remainder of the allotment that accessed Gregory Street and adjoined the driveway that had been added to "The Grange" by John Taylor in 1863.

The Soldiers Hill tramway opened on 27 December 1888 as a one car horse drawn service travelling along Lydiard Street and Macarthur Street and terminating at Gregory Street, a very short walk from "The Grange". This must have added significantly to the value of the property.

In September, 1905, Joseph Forshaw died and his funeral was held from his home at "The Grange"

=== Mary Jane Forshaw (Birt) ===
Probate of Joseph Forshaw's will was granted in October 1905 to his widow Mary Jane Forshaw. He left real estate to the value of £1,000 and personal property of £11,210, which included quite a lot of shares.. He bequeathed his “… dwelling house and land situate in Lydiard Street North … unto my dear wife Mary Jane …”. Additionally, she was left the house's furniture, which amounted to £188.1.0.

A little more than a year after the death of her husband, Mary Jane Forshaw put "The Grange" up for auction, including “… the whole of her well selected household furniture and effects …” as she had decided to leave Ballarat for Melbourne.

=== Alfred Thomas Darling ===
Alfred Thomas Darling (~1885–1932), General merchant & Grazier, bought the property from Mary Jane Forshaw in October 1908 for £850.

Darling was born in Berkshire, England in 1861. His mother died during childbirth in 1863 and his father died five years later from consumption, leaving Alfred, and his brother Edwin, orphaned. It seems that "Alfred" had taken on that name, as he was born Thomas and was noted by that name on his shipping immigration records. Possibly he took the name in memory of his brother, Alfred, who had died just after their mother did in 1863.

He came to Victoria as an unassisted passenger 1868. and his elder brother Edwin followed 3 years later arriving on Stonehouse in September 1871.

His mother's sister, Mary Broadstock Shepherd (Tame) (1823–1910) was living at Linton, a small gold diggings west of Ballarat, which became a market gardening area feeding the miners when the gold ran out. She and her husband, Joseph Shepherd (1833–1921) who had no children of their own, took the Darling boys and brought up her orphaned English relatives.

After some time, Alfred went to Stawell and worked there for a few years before going to Sheep Hills, a rather flat area with a station on the railway line between Minyip and Warracknabeal in the Victoria Wimmera. His father, Edwin Darling, had been a storekeeper in England, and Joe Shepherd had a general store in Linton; Alfred set up a general store at Sheep Hills. His elder brother Edwin moved there with him and started a timber business in the community that was developing around the railway station.

In 1886 the railway from Minyip was extended to Warracknabeal, and many settled around the station, forming the township under the name of Sheep Hills, with its German-Lutheran traditions

Alfred was obviously very successful and purchased a number of farming properties in the Wimmera. he is noted as of "Independent Means" on the title deeds to The Grange.

Alfred Thomas Darling had three families:

—He married Betsy McCooke (1861–1897) in 1885 They had five children whilst living at Sheep Hills, before Betsy died in 1897.

—He then married Mary Jane Ginnane (1874–1905) at Sheep Hills the following year, 1898, and they had two daughters before she died aged 31 in 1905, having been thrown from a buggy.

—His third wife was Elspit Cornish Gove (1882–1964), whom he married in 1907, and they had five daughters.

The property was 804 Lydiard Street when it was purchased by Darling, and become number 808 when three houses were built along Lydiard Street from the corner of Gregory Street. An orchard was on the eastern side of the property, but was dilapidated when the Darlings moved in. A Hawthorn hedge ran down the Lydiard Street boundary together with a picket fence, and the laneway access to Gregory Street was lined with Hawthorns. The property boasted huge Cypresses and copses of Laurel trees in very much a non-traditional style, and a tennis court. There was a huge wood heap in the horse paddock to service the house and additional wood was stored on another 32 acre block which Darling owned in nearby Doveton Street North, Ballarat North. At this time there was a horse paddock which ran the length of the property, from Gregory street to Howiitt street, which was later used for his draught horses. These horses worked at the Ballarat Railway yards pulling and moving rolling stock.

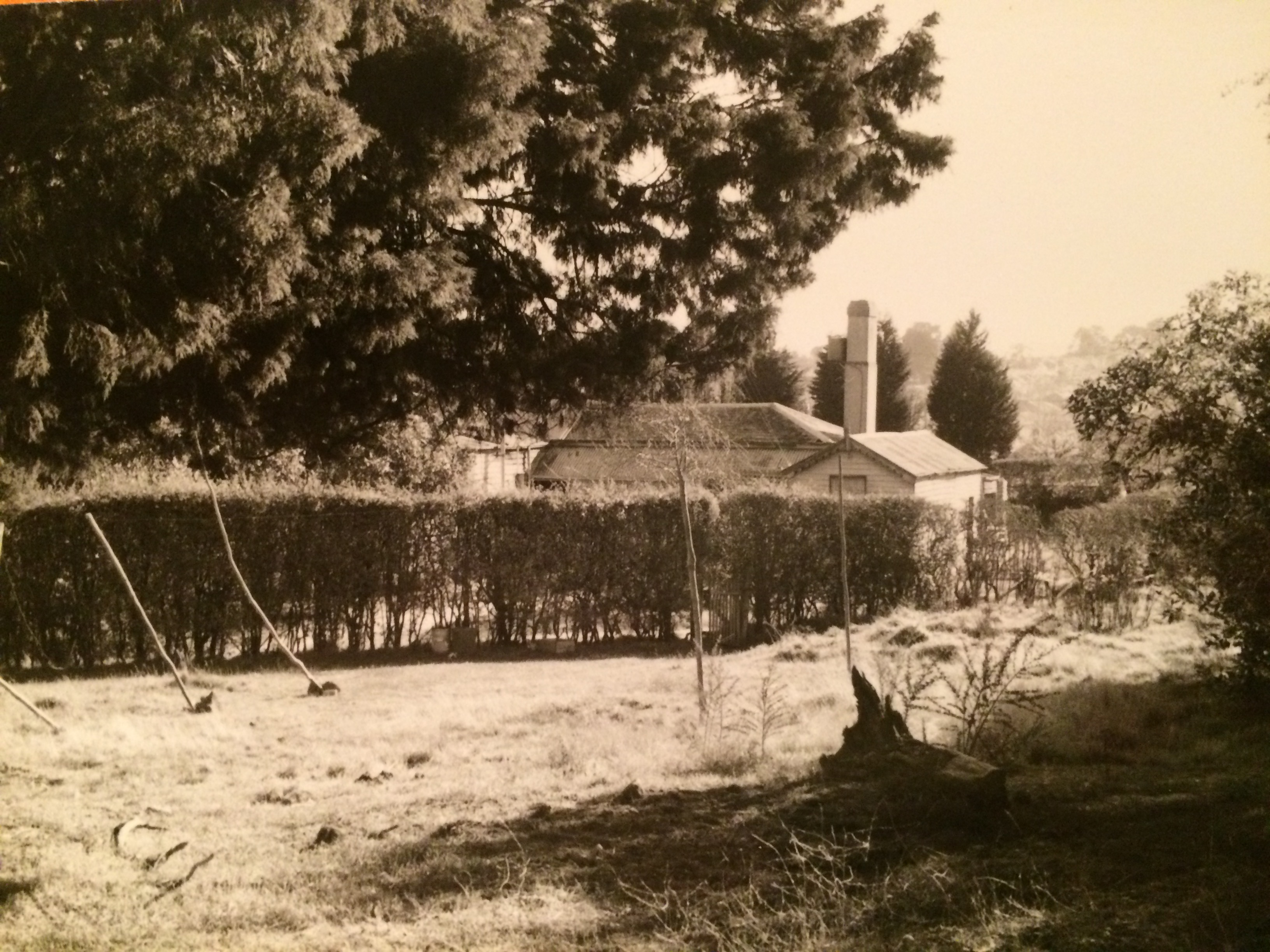
Laneway of The Grange, accessing Gregory Street

Albert Thomas Darling died from pneumonia at his residence The Grange in September, 1932.

Probate was granted in November 1932 and his son, Alfred Edward Darling, Company Manager of Swan Hill, and Fidelity Trustees Executors & Agency Company of Lydiard St. were duly appointed as the executors.

Alfred had bequeathed the right to live at The Grange for life to his wife Elspit and their daughters. The property was valued at the time at £6,600, and included the original two allotments purchased by John Taylor form the Crown in 1862 together with the additional adjoining driveway and allotment facing Gregory Street.

Elspit lived at The Grange up until her death in 1964. Myrtle Darling also lived at The Grange up until her death in 1971, and in 1972, her sisters, Annie Muriel Darling and Edith Jean Darling decided it was time to move out of The Grange and have the property finally put up for sale 40 years after their father's death and his will giving them the right to continue to live at the family home.

=== B.E. Hayden & Company Proprietary Limited ===
Hayden & Co. became the owner of the property, Allotments 11 & 12, excluding the driveway to Gregory Street, in October 1973

Allotments 11 & 12 were subdivided into four housing blocks along Lydiard Street and a driveway into another 1 acre 3 rood 31&1/3 perches block, being Allotment 5. The allotment was then subdivided again into a number of title units. Annie and Edith Darling had moved directly across Lydiard Street from their old home at "The Grange" and had a perfect vantage point to view the demolition of the house, felling of the trees and hedges, and the block subdivided.

== Torrens Title System of Land Titles ==
The land on which The Grange was to be built was purchased in August 1862. In October 1862, the Torrens title system of land registration became law in Victoria. "Its purpose was to introduce and maintain a single register of information about land in private ownership (freehold land). Under this system, the State Government took control of land registration and guaranteed title ownership in the Torrens land Register (historically known as the Register Book)."

As a consequence of being purchased before the introduction of the Torrens system, the land remained under the Real Property Act, the "old law", where there were no Certificates of Title or Volumes and Folio numbers in a Register that was centrally managed by the State government.

There was no obligation for a landowner to bring their old law land under the Torrens system, and apparently the cost of doing so was a real deterrence.

The land on which The Grange stood remained under old law until 1963, when the executors of Alfred Darling's will began arrangements to realise the value off the property. Certificate of Title Volume 8255 Folio 357, issued on March 7, 1963 was the first Certificate of Title issued for the property that had been bought from the Crown over 100 years before.
