= Eyres House, Soldiers Hill, Ballarat =

Eyres House is an historic residential property, located at 810 Ligar Street Soldiers Hill in the Victorian gold rush city of Ballarat, Victoria, Australia. Later named Balmoral, the house was constructed between 1901 and 1905 for Joseph Bryant, and having passed through as series of private hands, is now under the ownership of the Ballarat Health Services for use as a day centre and intermittent residential service for people with memory loss and confusion.

Previously known as "Esleta" and then "Balmoral", the house was renamed "Eyres House", in recognition of the contributions of the Eyres family, after it was purchased by Ballarat Health Services around 1960.

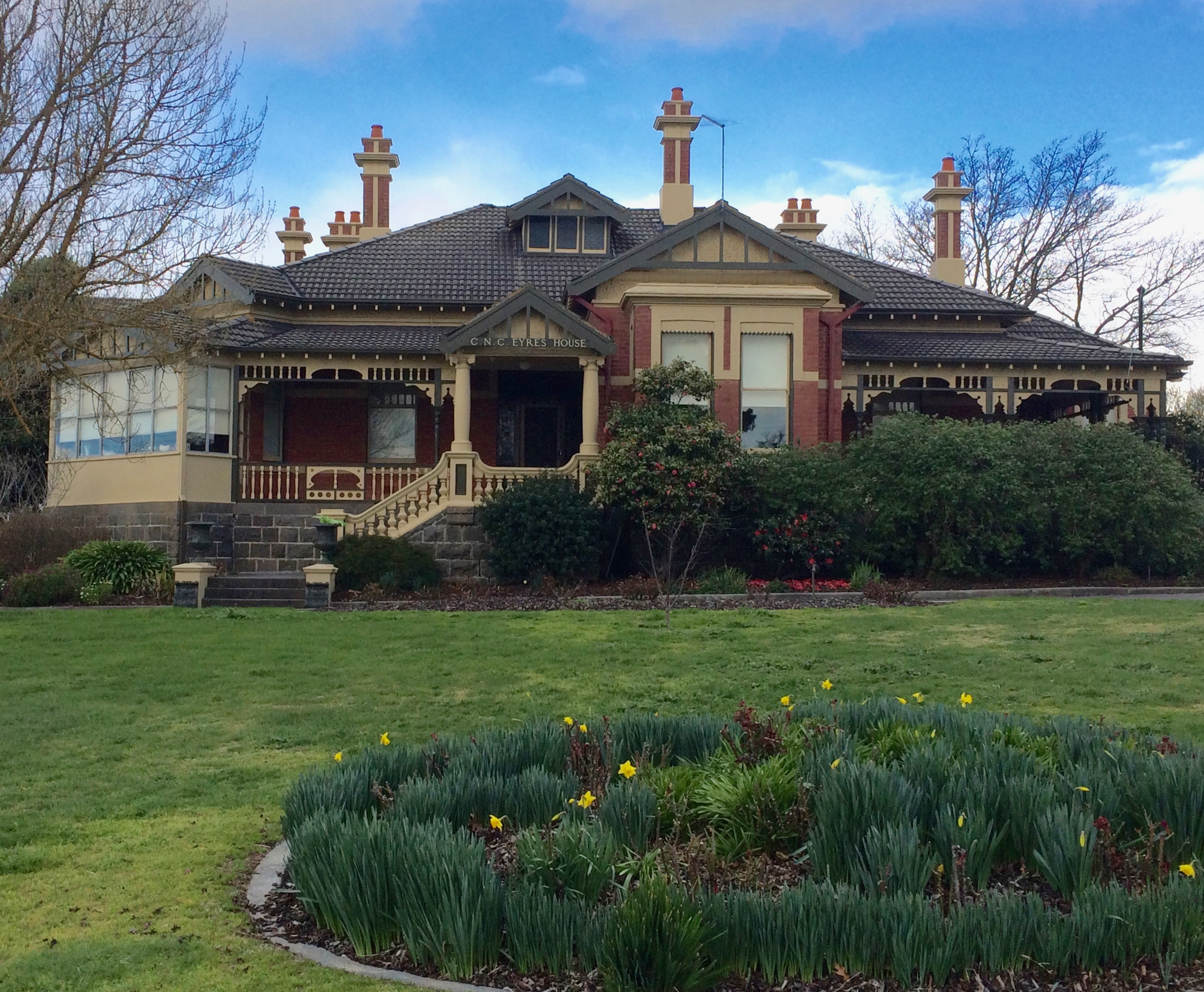
Eyres House, formerly known as "Esleta" and then as "Balmoral"

== History ==
=== William Mountford Kinsey Vale MLA ===
The original Crown Grant of the property, on which the house was built, was to William Mountford Kinsey Vale (1833–1895). Vale bought Allotment 2 of Section 3, Township of Ballarat North, Parish of Ballarat, County of Grenville, in 1886 for £10.5.0 and Allotment 3 for the sum of £10, both being an acre approx. in size. Ligar Street, where Eyres House is located, was named in recognition of Charles Whybrow Ligar, the unpopular surveyor-general of Victoria 1858–1869.

During the early to mid 1860s land between Howitt and Gregory Streets was also purchased from the Crown for what were to become the grand houses Trelawny, Black Hill, Ballarat, Linlithgow and The Grange.

William Vale was a local bookseller and newsagent, who qualified as a barrister in England and became the member for Ballarat West in the Victorian Legislative Assembly for Ballarat West from November 1864 to August 1865, and from September 1865 to April 1869. He was very involved in a number of Ballarat community activities, including as a committee member of the Ballarat Benevolent Asylum.

W.M.K. Vale moved to Abbotsford, where he died, after he won the seat for Collingwood in 1889. It was there he died.

=== Richard Tayler Vale MLA ===
The two allotments were sold to Vale's brother, Richard Tayler Vale (1836–1916), a bookseller, newsagent, investor and director of a number of gold mining companies, in 1887, who also bought the adjoining Allotment 4 from Thomas Sanderson Walker, the original purchaser from the Crown in 1866, when he had paid £25 for his acre on the corner of Ligar and Gregory Streets. R.T. Vale therefore owned Allotments 2, 3 & 4 fronting Ligar Street. Like his brother, W.M.K. Vale, Richard Vale was elected to the Victorian Legislative Assembly as the member for Ballarat West, serving from 1886 until 1889, and again 1892 to 1902.

Vale Street, Sebastopol is named after The Honourable R. T. Vale, MP.

The Vale brothers, W.M.K. & R.T., also owned blocks of land near the corner of Ligar and Howitt streets.

=== Ethel Ford Bryant - "Esleta" ===
R.T. Vale sold Allotments 2, 3 & 4 to Ethel Bryant Ford (1878–1937) in April, 1900. She was the eldest child of Joseph "Joe" & Elizabeth Bryant, and it has been generally and long assumed the property was owned by Joe. Why the property was owned by Ethel, and not her wealthy parents, is not known.

In 1901 Joseph Bryant JP commissioned a fine residence to be built on Soldiers Hill, which, at the time, was on the outskirts of Ballarat.

His brother, Robert Ford ("R.F.") Bryant, also a wealthy mining investor and director of gold mining companies, already had a large, gracious Victorian house in the area, "Trelawny", Black Hill, Ballarat, which he built in 1886, and where some of his descendants still live. "Trelawny" is at 804 Havelock Street, Black Hill, the next street east parallel to Ligar Street.

Snow at 810 Ligar St., Soldiers Hill, 25 September 1905

Joseph Bryant (1849–1917), an Englishman from Altarnun in Cornwall, England, who arrived in Australia in 1863, had been very successful as investor and mine manager in the gold mines at Clunes, Victoria, including the North Clunes Mining Co., one of the richest in the district in its day He commissioned local architect F.W. Turton to build a large residence in the "American-Swiss" style, according to an article in Ballarat and District 1901. The house was designed around a central skylight foyer with rooms and corridors radiating from it. The house originally had seven bedrooms, some which have now been converted into a bathroom and toilet.

Originally on the outskirts of Ballarat, the property took up almost the entire Ligar Street frontage between Gregory and Howitt Streets, and had an elaborate front fence. The residence in Ligar Street dominated the landscape, with only a few villas in Howitt Street, but otherwise in open country.

The house was constructed in what we now refer to in Australia as the Federation architectural style that was prevalent from around 1890 to 1915.

Broadly speaking, it is the Australian version of the Edwardian Style, but differed from Edwardian in the use of Australian motifs. Cream painted decorative timber features and elaborate fretwork, tall chimneys, leadlight windows and a Tudor type look, especially on gables, is very much part of the Federation style and is particularly evident at what is now Eyres House.

His first wife, Elizabeth Gilbert ( 1853-1884 ) died in 1884, and the following year, Joseph Bryant married her younger sister, Selina Gilbert (1858–1887). She died two years later and it was another 18 years before Bryant with his six children – five from his first marriage and one from the second – moved into the house they named, "Esleta". The curious name was made up from the first names of Joseph Bryant's children – the five with his first wife; Ethel Ford Bryant, Selina Gilbert Bryant (1880–1958), Lillian Parker Bryant (1881–1957), Elizabeth Curtis Bryant (1883–1951), Thomas Gilbert Bryant (1884–1949); and Ada Violet Bryant (1886–1952), the only child with his second wife.

There were a number of grand homes in the close vicinity, including "The Grange" in Lydiard Street North, and "Linlithgow" in Gregory Street, Ballarat. The only indication of the existence of "The Grange" is a short eponymous street leading into the houses and townhouses that now occupy the subdivided site."Linlithgow" still stands in substantial grounds.

Joseph Bryant and with his brother R.F. Bryant had borne the brunt of the miners' anger during the Clunes Riots of December, 1873 against the importation of Chinese strike breakers. "The miners,'accompanied by troops of women and children proceeded to the residences of several miners who had rendered themselves obnoxious ... by continuing work ... . Warnings were given those offending men to leave town ... 'They then marched to Mr. Bryant's home to demand his resignation as mine manager. However, some of the men claimed consideration for Bryant's family, and Bryant assured them that ' he had all along been opposed to bringing Chinamen'. He was allowed to stay.

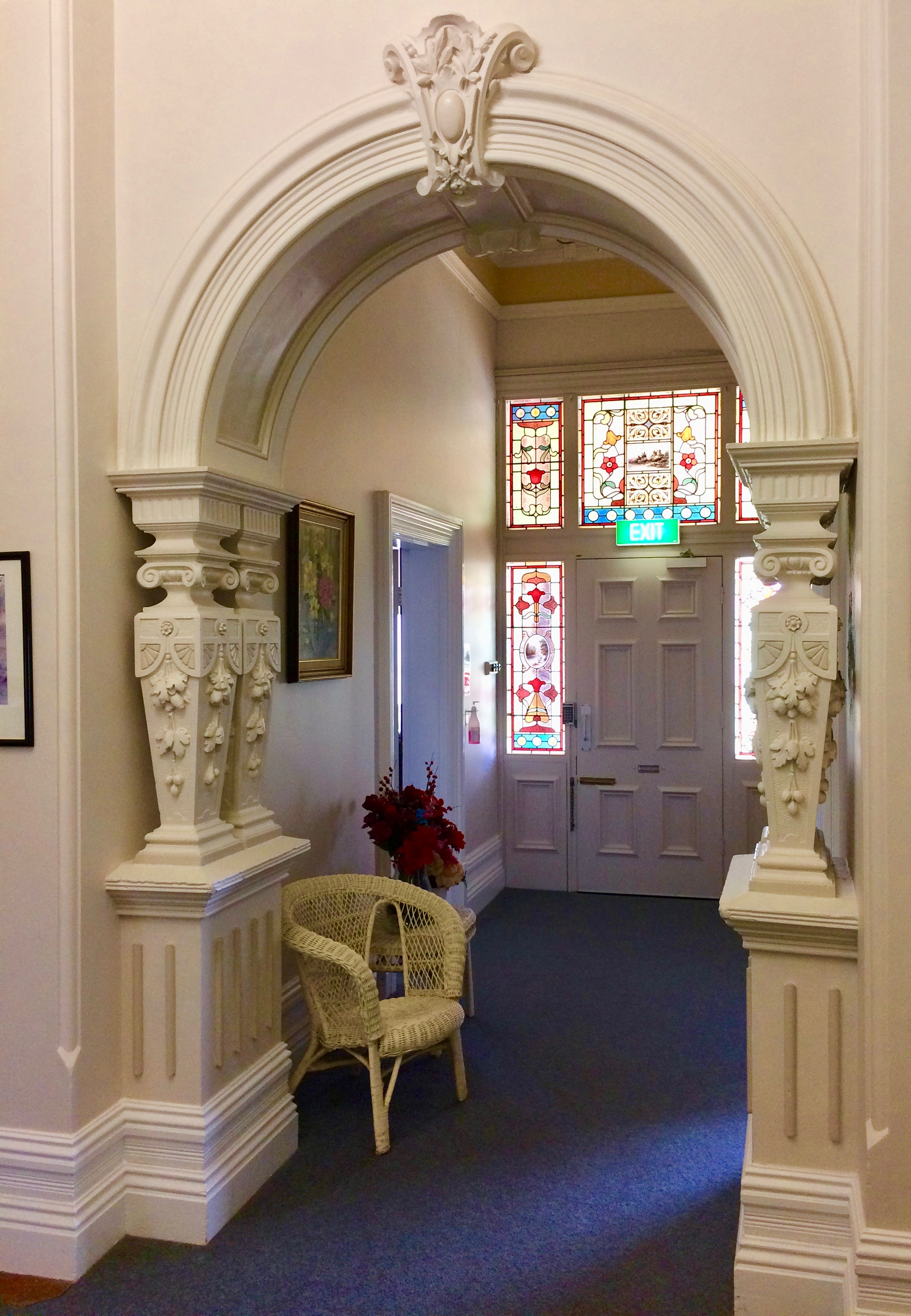
Entrance hall with decorative and structural cast iron embellishments from local Ballarat foundries

This may have been part of the reason for the Bryant brothers' move from Clunes and into Ballarat.

=== Adam Lindsey Ronaldson - "Balmoral" ===
In 1903 Adam Lindsey Ronaldson had been taken into partnership by his brother, David Ronaldson, who had recently established a machinery manufacturing company on Creswick Road, Ballarat, which produced chaff cutters and grain crushers. It 1905, John Tippett joined the company and it became Ronaldson Brothers & Tippett Pty. Ltd., which made internal combustion engines and water cooled engines. The company built a wide size range of oil engines which it sold across Australia and promoted under the Austral brand. The company was still operating up until 1969 when it closed due to cheaper imported engines becoming available on the market.

"A property known as the; Ballarat North Mansion, erected eight years, ago by Mr. Joseph Bryant, a mining investor, at a cost of £500, has been sold by Messrs. Chas. Walker and Co., auctioneers, to Mr. Adam Ronaldson, implement maker, of Creswick-road". Adam Ronaldson (1899–1916) bought the property in October 1912, and the family lived there from 1912 until 1918, after his death in 1916. It was Ronaldson who gave the house the name "Balmoral".

Business partner John Tippett also owned a fine house, "Rothbury", which also still stands, at Lal Lal, outside Buninyong, Victoria.

Adam Ronaldson died in 1916 and "Balmoral" was transferred into his estate, from where the property was split up and Allotment 2 was sold, and parts of Allotment 3 became part of "Balmoral" or residential blocks. This divestment happened in parts over a period of time, from probate of the will in March 1916, to June 1929. During this time, the remaining balance of Allotment 3 of the property was transferred in March 1934 to Adam's wife, widow, Isabella Magdalene Ronaldson (Hood).

=== Mrs. Fanny Jolliffe ===
Mrs. Fanny Jolliffe (Bowring) (1858–1935) of Newlyn, Victoria bought the property from the Ronaldson estate, which she owned during the period 1920 to 1922. It had diminished considerably from its original size and now was little more than an acre in area, straddling one and a part of the original Crown Allotments - Allotment 2 & part of Allotment 3.

=== Arthur Richard Stewart JP ===
Arthur Stewart (1880–1946), mill owner and produce merchant from Newlyn, Victoria, bought the property in November 1922, but were not able to have access for several months as there was an existing lease. This lease must have been to Mrs. Jolliffe, the previous owner.

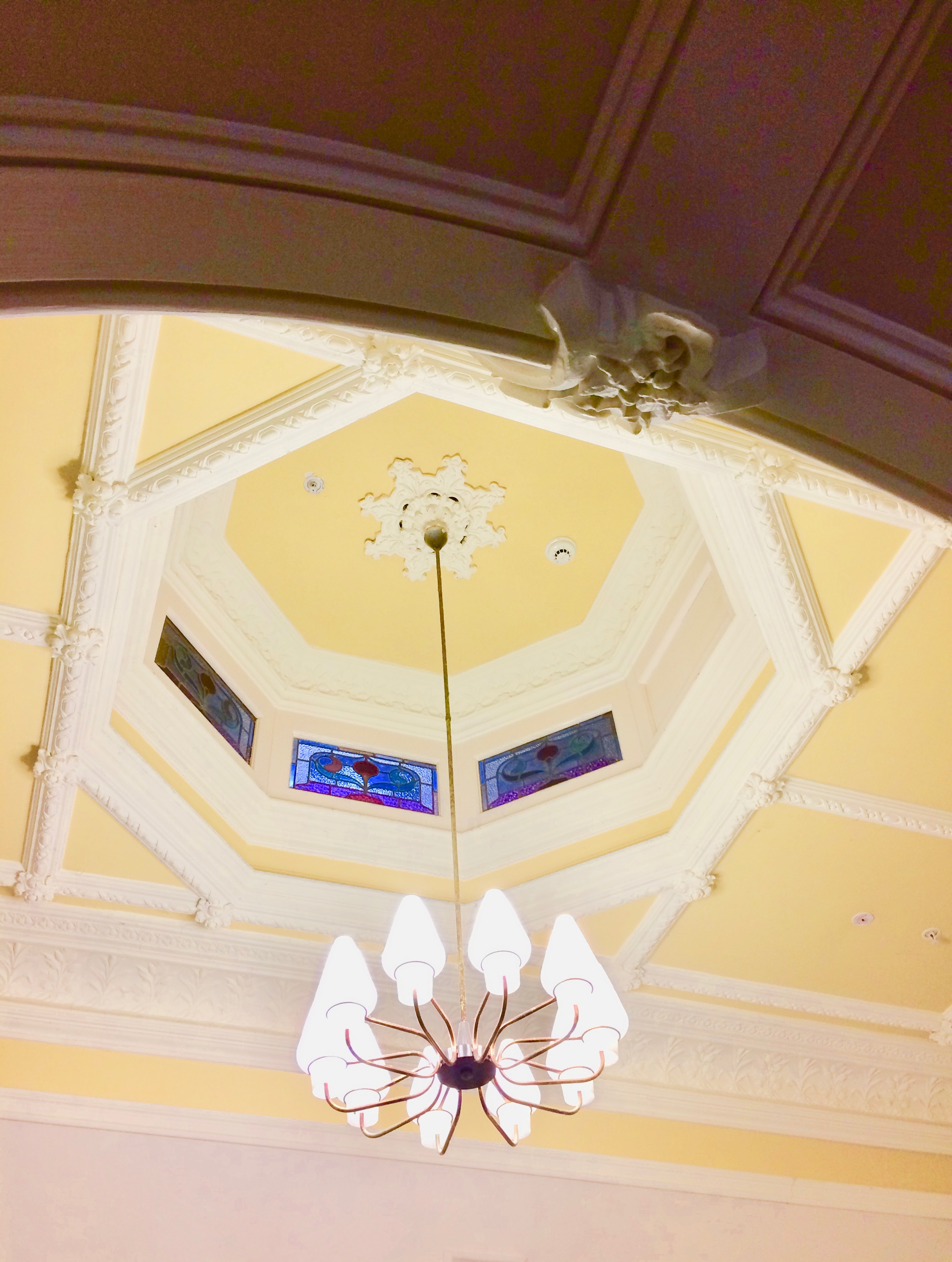
Interior foyer with stained glass skylight

In November 1929, he bought the remainder southern part of Allotment 3, reuniting Allotments 2 & 3 as the property originally was from the Crown Grant in 1866.

The Stewarts lived there with their six children from the 1920s to about 1937. Mr. Arthur Richard Stewart, Justice of the Peace, was president of Creswick Shire and then served two terms as Mayor of Ballarat

=== Mrs. Minerva Mary Fowler Lewis ===
As was the situation with Joe Bryant in 1901, it was assumed that the property was owned by the "head of the family" Horace Laffer Lewis, a mechanical engineer, who lived at "Balmoral", with his wife and their two children from about 1937, until his death in 1955. He had been gassed serving in World War 1 and much later in life contracted tuberculosis.

"Balmoral" was actually owned by Horace's wife, Minerva Lewis (Smith) (1900–1991), known as "Minnie". In October 1941, Lot 2, and the reunited parts of Allotment 3, were bought by her from the Stewarts.

=== Ballarat Health Services - "Eyres House" ===
"Balmoral" served as a private residence until February 1961 when it was purchased Ballarat Health Services' The Queen Elizabeth Home from Minerva Mary Fowler Lewis in February 1961, and renamed it "Eyres House" in recognition of the contribution the Eyres Family had made to the organisation.

"Eyres House" became a hostel for women with intellectual disabilities until the mid-1980s. and continues to operate as a haven for people suffering from dementia and their families.

== Walled Garden ==
The residence still has its walled garden, which is a feature that is very unusual to find in such heritage homes in Ballarat. In the walled garden vegetables and fruit trees were grown, and is still an important facility for residents of Eyres House.
