= Soldiers Hill, Victoria =

Soldiers Hill
- Suburb
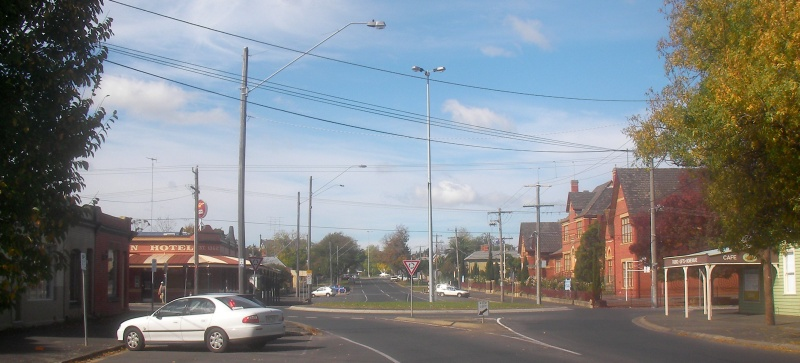
- Macarthur Street, main commercial area of Soldiers Hill looking east; North Britain Hotel is on the left, Macarthur St. Primary is on the right

- Interactive map of Soldiers Hill
- Coordinates: 37.550°S 143.858°E
- Country: Australia
- State: Victoria
- City: Ballarat
- LGA: City of Ballarat
- Location: 1.5 km (0.93 mi) from Ballarat Central
- Established: 1859

Government
  - State electorate: Wendouree
  - Federal division: Ballarat

Area
  - Total: 1.52 km^{2} (0.59 sq mi)
- Elevation: 472 m (1,549 ft)

Population
  - Total: 2,813 (2021 census)
  - Density: 1,851/km^{2} (4,793/sq mi)
- Postcode: 3350
- County: Grenville
Suburbs around Soldiers Hill
Wendouree	Ballarat North	Black Hill
Ballarat Central	Soldiers Hill	Ballarat East
Ballarat Central	Ballarat Central	Ballarat Central

Soldiers Hill is a suburb of Ballarat, Victoria, Australia located directly north of the Central Business District. At the 2021 census, Soldiers Hill had a population of 2,813.

Named Soldiers Hill during the first residential land sales in 1859 in honour of the Colonial forces of Australia 40th Regiment who were stationed there prior to the battle of the Eureka Rebellion and the Eureka Stockade riot, it is the earliest planned suburb of Ballarat.

Soldiers Hill is an important heritage area in Ballarat and the entire suburb is covered by a City of Ballarat Heritage Overlay. It has a substantially intact Victorian era architectural character, with many of its buildings featuring an abundance of period detail including distinctive decorative cast iron ornament.

== Geography ==
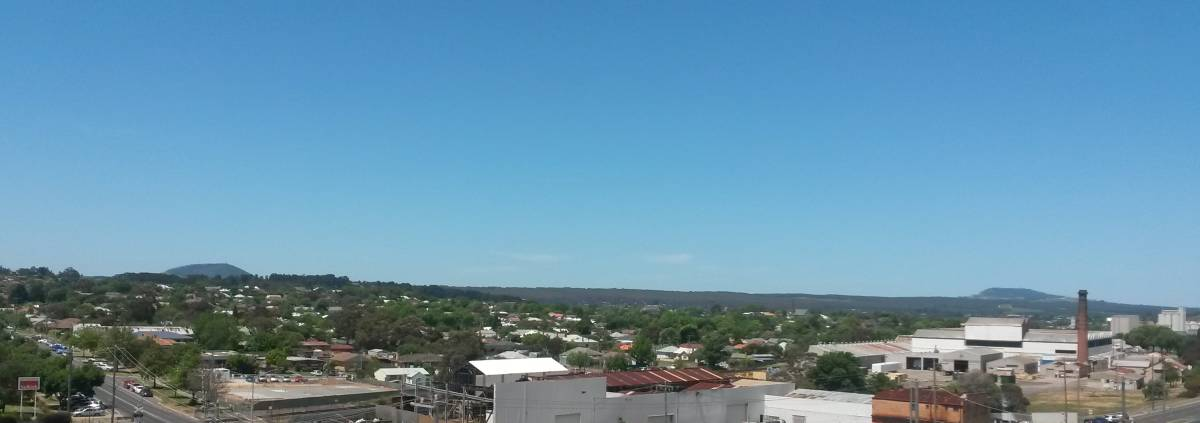
View looking east over Soldiers Hill and beyond to Black Hill, Mount Warrenheip and Mount Buninyong from Wendouree near the intersection of Howitt Street and Creswick Road. Visible Landmarks include Scots Church Lydiard Street spire (centre right) and the railway workshops (bottom right). Ballarat CBD is hidden from view at far right.

Soldiers Hill covers a relatively small area bounded by the Mildura Railway Line to the west, the Serviceton Railway Line to the south, Havelock Street and the Yarrowee River to the east and Howitt Street to the north and is primarily residential.

The "hill" is a schist composed of hard granites and quartz, part of a granite ridge which extends south and west from Lydiard Street and forms a plateau to the south and west. In stark contrast to neighbouring Black Hill and Golden Point Hill across the Yarrowee valley, which are scarred by extensive gold mining, the plateau of Soldiers Hill was found to bear little gold. It did not escape deformation, though, and the historic peak between Macarthur and Clarendon Streets was progressively levelled from around the turn of the century, creating a new peak further to the north on Ligar Street between Macarthur and Chisholm Streets. A natural escarpment forms its southern edge which has been accentuated by the flattening of land to the south for the construction of the railway reserve. The hill slopes to valleys in the east and west of the suburb's borders through which small seasonal creeks flow. The Gnarr Creek, for most of its length little more than an urban stormwater drain, winds its way through the suburb's north, crossing the railway reserve at Little Clyde Street to the west. The eastern border slopes to the valley of a small unnamed natural watercourse that flows into the Yarrowee from the north.

== History ==
Before European settlement, the area around Soldiers Hill was populated by Wathaurong people, an Indigenous Australian tribe. The hill itself was a steep escarpment that formed part of a greater range and was a schist of quartz and tall stringybark trees.

William Cross Yuille was the first settler of what was originally named "Commanding Hill". Yuille had been well established in the region and had erected a shepherd's hut (in addition to his first hut located at Lake Wendouree) in the location marked by the current crossing of Seymour Street and Armstrong Street Nth. This hut existed as early as October 1851 being the only building on the hill at the time of William Swan Urquhart's first town plan for Ballarat, following the initial Ballarat gold rush. The hill was not subdivided in the first plan, though was part of the Grenville County. Later 1850s plans would include Soldiers Hill as one of the first planned suburbs of Ballarat with a grid plan north of the steep escarpment and Yarrowee River gully.

In 1853, on the hill was established one of the first of Ballarat's major schools, the national school, with 450 enrolments in its first year.

Colonial forces of Australia 40th Regiment were stationed on the hill prior to the Eureka Rebellion of 1854. Leading them were Robert Nickle and Edward Macarthur, after whom Macarthur Street was named.

In 1857, the first permanent buildings were constructed along Seymour Street, including the North Star Hotel and Huff Bakery, along with a new school known simply as the "Soldiers Hill School" constructed by the Presbyterian Church.

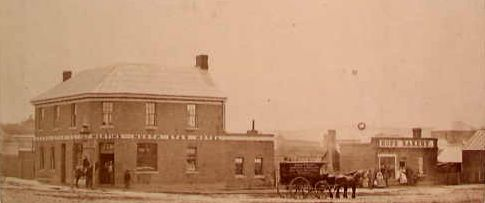
Corner of Seymour and Lydiard Streets in 1861 showing the North Star Hotel and Huff Bakery

In 1859, the first residential allotments were subdivided and sold, with the estate extending to Macarthur Street at the northern boundary. After Webster Street and Sturt Street, this estate was considered one of Ballarat's premier addresses.

Religious congregations established themselves at the highest point of the hill along with the large homes of the wealthy while middle class cottages and industry sprang up closer to the railway station. A new school, Macarthur Street Primary was constructed in 1877 and officially opened on 31 May 1878, replacing the Soldiers Hill School with an initial enrolment of 650 students.

In the 1880s the suburb was heavily subdivided as it became a favoured place of residence for Ballarat's middle and upper classes with the city readily accessed by tramway. The suburb had developed with deep narrow blocks and laneways providing rear access to houses.

An historic house, still in use today, is Eyres House, in Ligar Street.

The Soldiers Hill tramway opened on 27 December 1888 as a one car horse drawn service travelling along Lydiard Street and Macarthur Street.

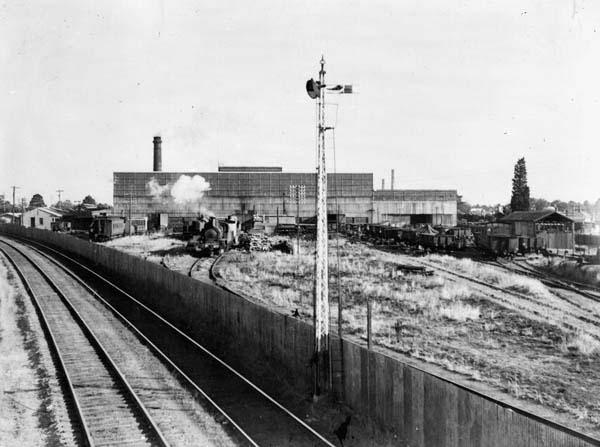
Exterior of the Ballarat North workshops opened in April 1917

The Ballarat North Workshops opened in April 1917 and were a major source of employment for Ballarat.

== Education ==
Schools include the Macarthur Street Primary School and St Columba's Catholic Primary School.

== Religion ==
According to the 2006 Census, religious beliefs of Soldiers Hill residents are primarily Christian, representing more than half (53%) of all residents in line with the Australian average. In terms of religious affiliation, 27.4% were Catholic, 12.5% Anglicanism, 9.7% Uniting Church in Australia and 4.2% Presbyterianism. 24.2% did not affiliate with any religion - somewhat higher than the Australian average of 18.7%.

Victorian era churches clustered at the top of the hill include Scots Church Lydiard Street Nth (1890) and Neill Street Uniting Church (1861-1889) and St John's Anglican Church Armstrong Street (1864-1891).

== Housing ==
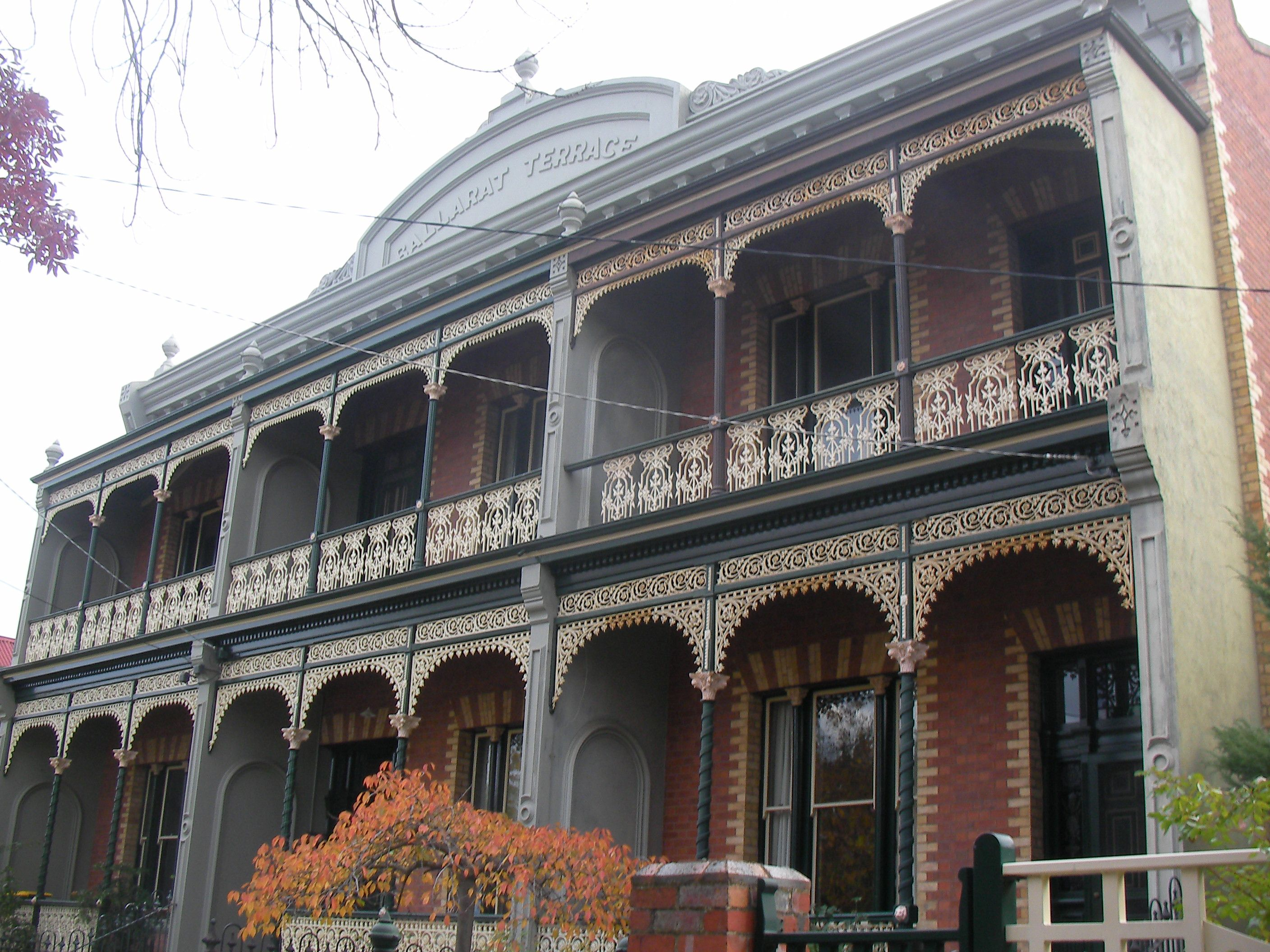
Ballarat Terrace on Lydiard Street - a rare double storey Victorian terrace in a suburb with a higher than average amount of attached housing.

According to the 2006 Census there are a total of 1,176 dwellings in Soldiers Hill. The suburb's housing mix is atypical of greater Ballarat. Although 74% of the suburb's housing was detached houses (equal to the average for Australia but lower than 86% for the urban area), Soldiers Hill has a significant amount of medium-density housing compared to the Ballarat and Australia as a whole. 16% of houses are semi-detached, terrace houses or townhouses up to two storeys (as compared to 4% for the greater Ballarat and 9.2% for Australia). There are also slightly lower ratio of flats, units or apartments (8%) than greater Ballarat (10%) or Australia (14.2%) and there were no residential buildings greater than 3 storeys in the suburb. In terms of general character and style, the majority of the homes are larger middle-class homes dating to the Victorian era and Edwardian era with ornamental verandahs decorated in iron lacework or wooden fretwork. The suburb also includes many narrow iron laced cottages and a smaller collection of Interwar and modern infill homes.

According to the 2006 Census, 56.7% of homes were occupied by families with an average household size of 2.3 persons. In terms of ownership of private dwellings, 27.8% were fully owned, 34.0% were being purchased and 30.9% were being rented.

== Commercial areas ==
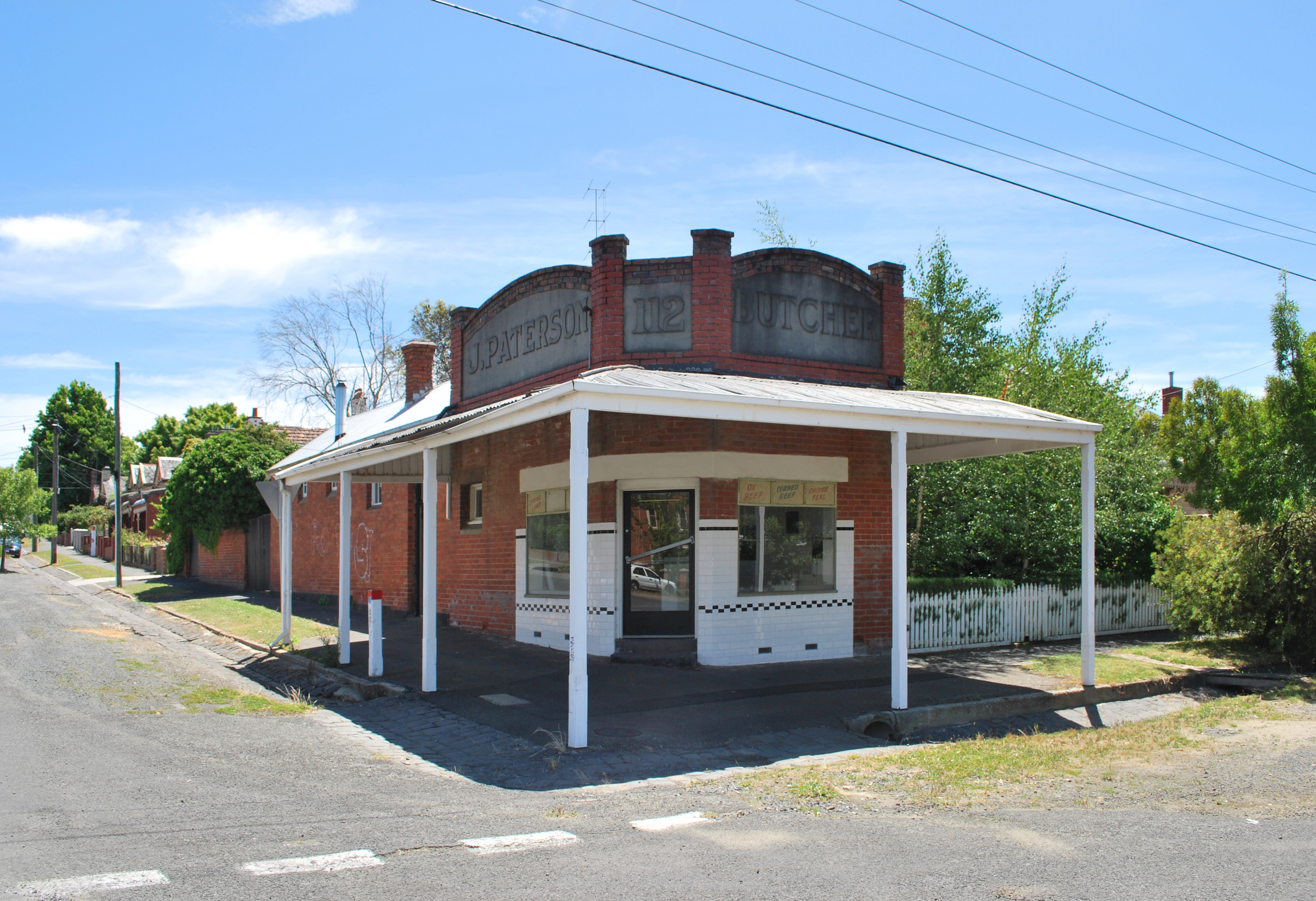
Former Paterson's Butchers on Neill Street is one of the many examples of preserved shop houses that were once home to local businesses.

The main commercial area is at Macarthur Street, which has a number of small businesses operating out of shopfronts.

Commercial activity has historically been distributed, with a number of traditional corner stores, corner hotels and a number of older homes with shopfront extensions. With the arrival of supermarkets and shopping malls in Ballarat, many of these small businesses, such as milk bars have since closed. Since the advent of heritage policies, most have been preserved. Some have been adaptively reused, however others remain or have been reopened as boutique service businesses, specialty stores, cafes and food businesses.

== Transport ==
The suburb's proximity to the CBD greatly influences resident modes of transportation in comparison to the Ballarat average. In particular, most forms of use of public transport for commuting is more than double the Ballarat average, along with modes such as walking and cycling.

However like most Australian suburbs, automobiles are the main form of transport, with the vast majority of commuters (64.1%) travelling to work by car (though less than the Ballarat average of 74%). Roads are laid out in grid plan, with traffic dispersed between them. With the exception of narrow lanes which provide access to some residential blocks, all of the streets are single carriageways with one lane each way. There is only one designated collector road, Howitt Street, which runs along the suburb's east west border although it is also a single carriageway. There are, however a number of moderately trafficked informal collectors. These include, by virtue of their connection to the Ballarat CBD, the north south streets of Lydiard Street Nth, Doveton Street and Armstrong Street. The east west street of Macarthur Street connects with the key north-south routes of Creswick Road (in Ballarat Central) to the west and Peel Street Nth (Black Hill) in the east.

According to the census data, 7.1% of people walk to work (more than twice the Ballarat average). Pedestrian facilities include a network of footpaths on most streets, some such as Lydiard and Doveton Crescent being upgraded with tactile paving for disability access.

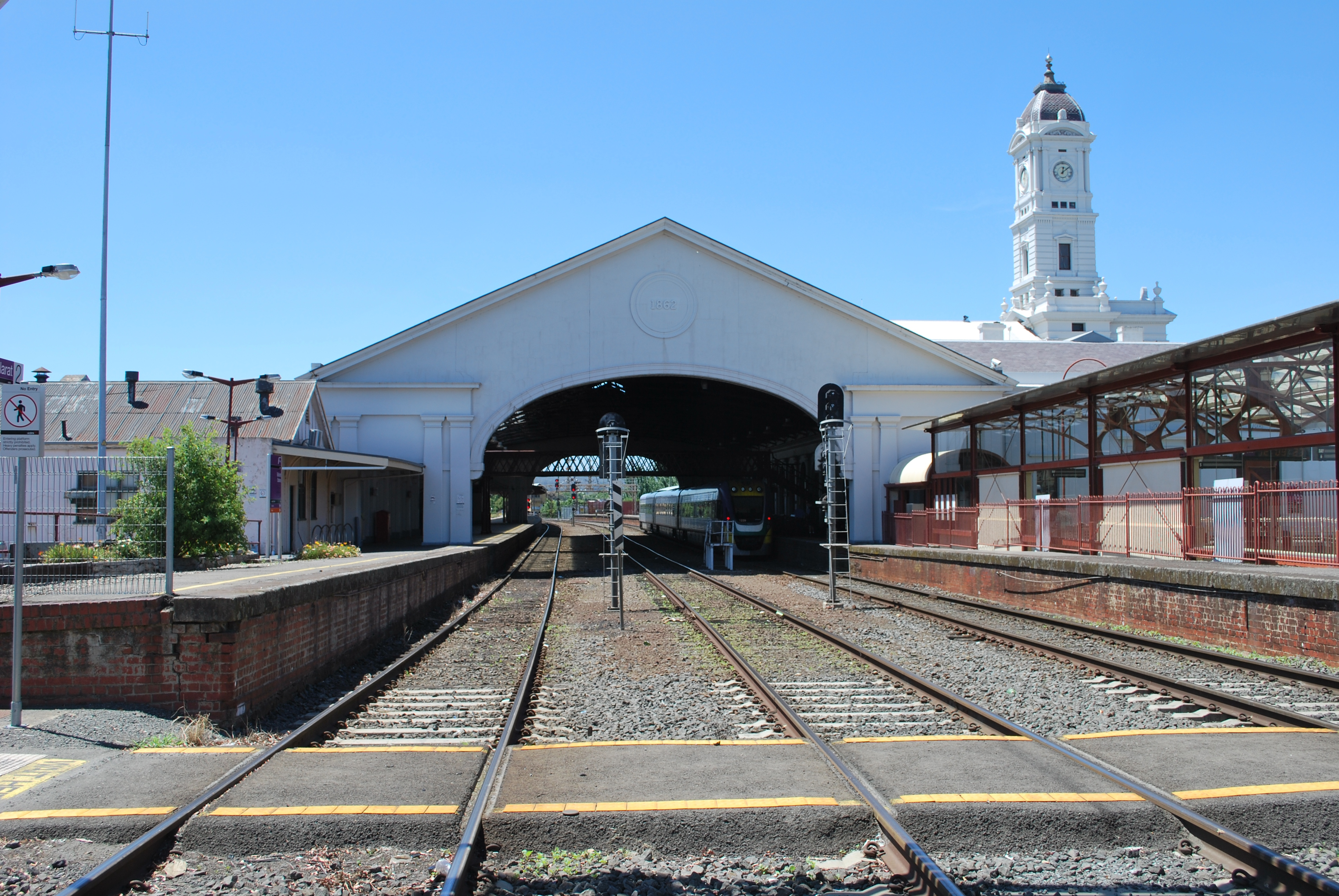
Ballarat railway station complex from Lydiard Street

At the southern end of the suburb is the Ballarat railway station, the busiest in urban Ballarat. According to the 2011 Census, 4% of people commute by train (four times the Ballarat average and an increase of 100% since the 2006 Census). Growth in train travel is facilitated by major rail improvements. Soldiers Hill benefits from the trend toward intercity commuting in being the closest residential area to Ballarat station. An important part of Ballarat's strong railway history, Soldiers Hill is home to its main railway complex as well as the Ballarat North Workshops, a major railway systems engineering facility. A number of historically used industrial branch lines serviced light industry in the 1880s, which was located along Creswick Road. The 1888 signal box at Macarthur Street (demolished due to vandalism in 2012), although platformless, was once staffed and was a drop-off and pick up point for trains used historically by students of Macarthur Street Primary. A tramway (demolished in the 1970s) once ran the length of Lydiard Street Nth with several stops in Soldiers Hill along the way.

Despite few bicycle dedicated facilities for cycling, it has historically been a popular form of travel in Soldiers Hill. According to census data, 1.9% cycle to work (more than twice the Ballarat average). A short segregated shared path runs along the railway reserve at Doveton Crescent. Only sections of Doveton Street and Lydiard Street Nth have marked bicycle lanes. Ballarat Railway station provides bicycle parking including a secure sheltered cage. Recreational cycling continues to thrive. Soldiers Hill is home to Ballarat's oldest bicycle shop, Gove cycles on Doveton Street which has been a hub for local cycling since 1957.

Three bus routes run through Soldiers Hill, although only two service the suburb. According to the 2006 Census, just 1% of Soldiers Hill residents commute by bus (equal to Ballarat's average). There are dedicated bus stops near major intersections. Many of these have bus zones allowing traffic to pass stopped buses, although few have shelters for passengers. The Invermay (4) service runs the length of Doveton Street Nth to the suburb's west. The Wendouree (2) service which runs along the spine of Lydiard Street Nth with stops at Doveton Crescent (Railway station), Seymour Street, Clarendon Street, Macarthur Street, Brougham/Chisolm Street, Howard Street (sheltered). The Black Hill (5) service runs through a small section of Soldiers Hill along Havelock Street in the suburb's north east however it does not stop in Soldiers Hill.

== Hotels ==
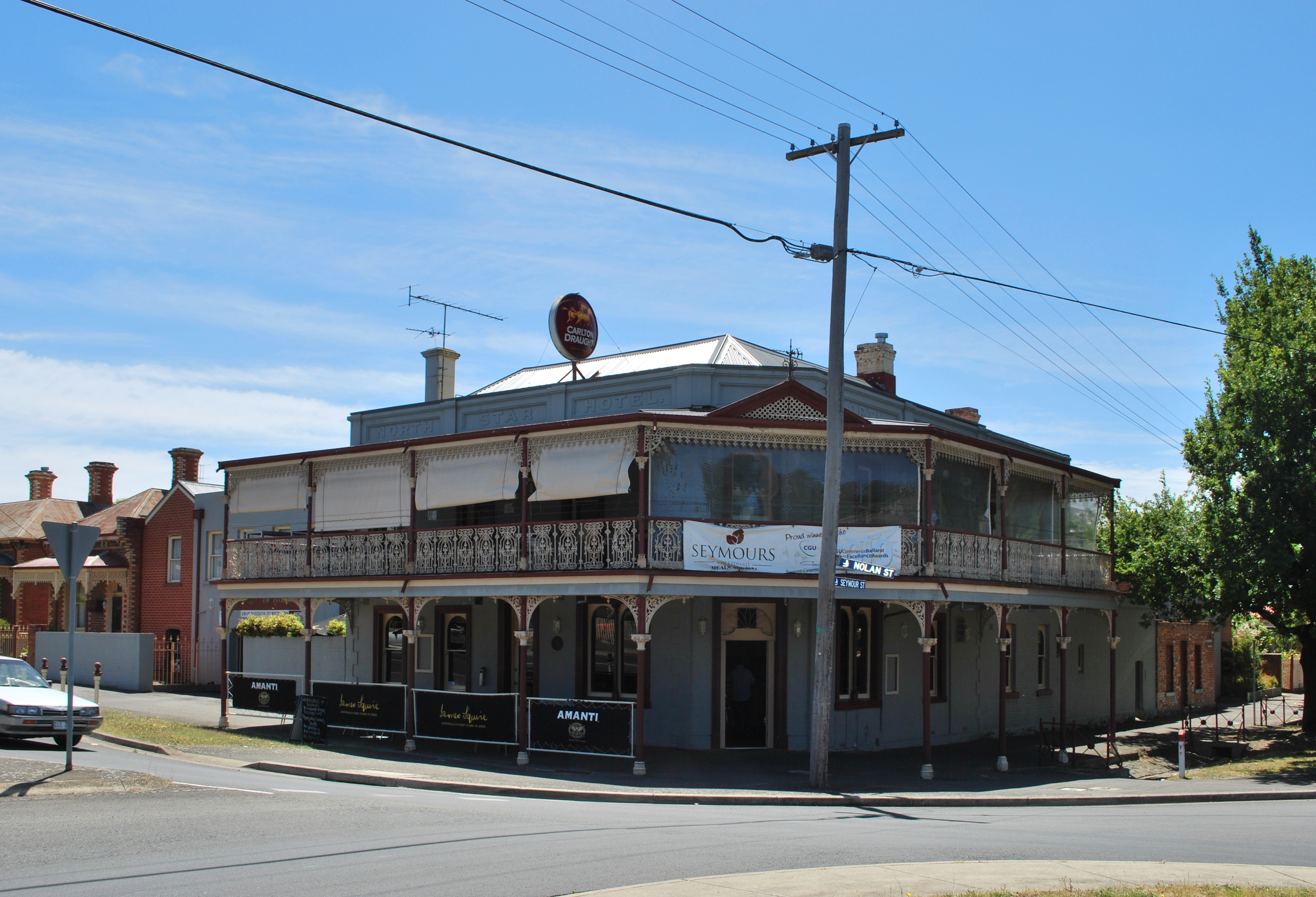
Seymours on Lydiard, one of the more popular suburban hotel/motels in Ballarat

Given the small area of the suburb, hotels (or corner pubs) have been an important social focus since the gold rush, however may have ceased to operate. The renovated Seymours (formerly North Star) incorporates motel style accommodation, while the North Britain Hotel and The Miller's Arms remain traditional pubs. The former Argyle hotel was converted into apartments in the 1990s. Historic hotels which were demolished in the postwar era include the Victoria Coffee Palace located on the corner of Doveton Crescent and Lydiard and the Soldiers Hill Hotel on the corner of Doveton Crescent and Armstrong Street.

== Recreation and open space ==
There is little to no open space in Soldiers Hill with few public reserves and few sporting facilities. The Ballarat North Bowls club and Macarthur Street Primary playground are the largest of these spaces.

== Notable people ==
- Peter Burns (Australian rules footballer) - attended the Soldiers Hill School
- Thomas Hollway, 36th Premier of Victoria - attended Macarthur Street School
- William Tibbits (Australian painter) - lived in Neill Street in 1870-1875.
