= Trelawny, Black Hill, Ballarat =

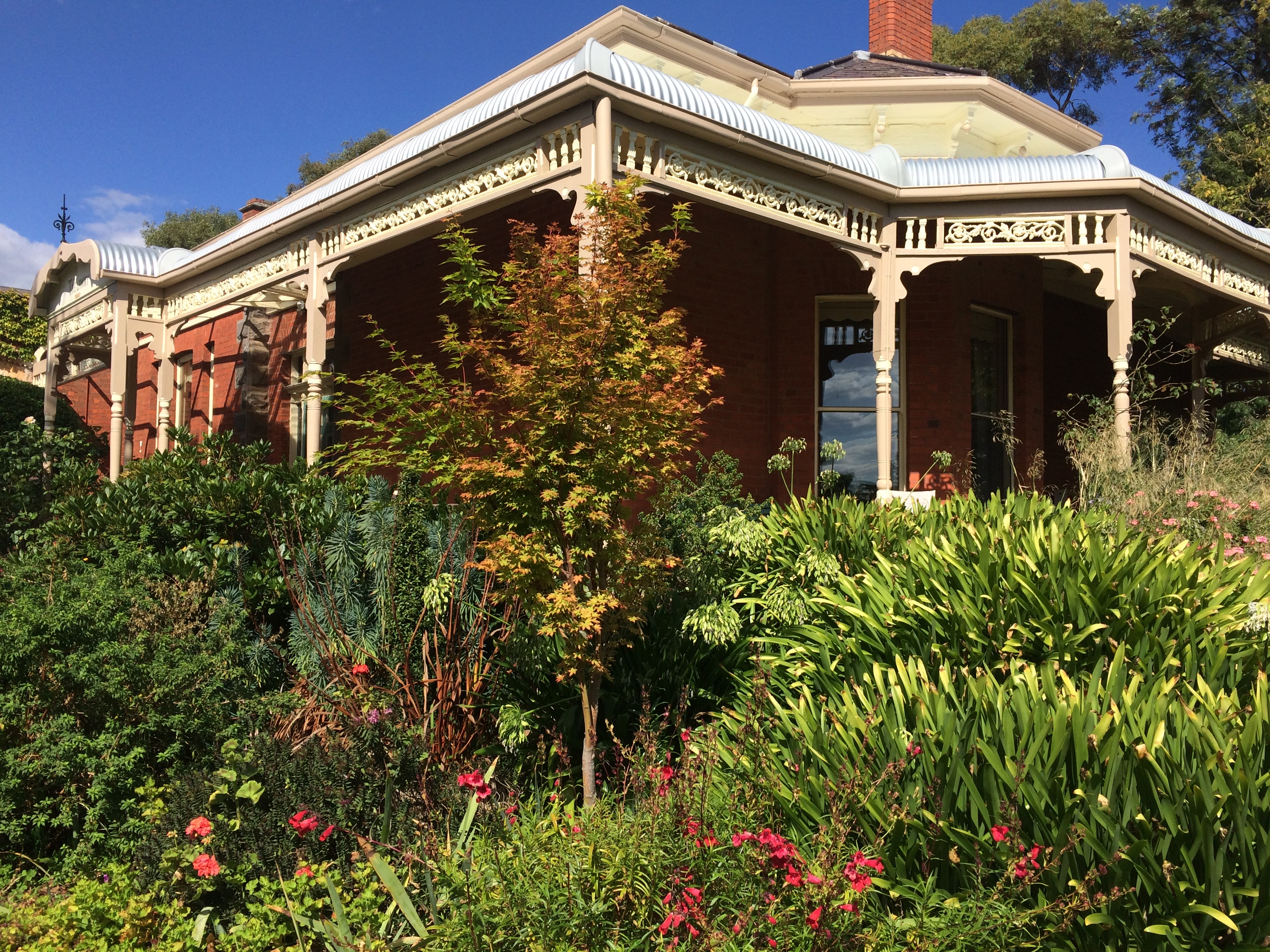
- Trelawny and garden at 804 Havelock St.

General information
- Location: 804 Havelock Street, Black Hill, Australia
- Coordinates: 37°32′45″S 143°52′00″E

Trelawny is a gracious heritage house located at 804 Havelock Street, Black Hill, a suburb of the Victorian gold rush city of Ballarat, Victoria, Australia (although the property is sometimes mistakenly thought to be located in neighboring Soldiers Hill). Havelock Street, the street where Trelawny is located, was named in recognition of Major General Sir Henry Havelock, a British general who is particularly associated with India and the Indian Mutiny of 1857.

== History ==
=== Samuel Figgis – Rehoboth ===
The land that Trelawny was later to stand on was purchased from the Crown in August 1862 by Samuel Figgis (1812–1879), a Dublin-born Irishman, who moved to London, England, where he married Englishwoman, Sarah Smith (c. 1819 – 1893), in 1843. Samuel and Sarah Figgis emigrated to the southern Australian state of Victoria on the ship Severn, arriving November 1852, with their sons Benjamin Johnston, William Harold, Charles Douglas and daughter Clara Elizabeth. Two additional children were born in Australia; Samuel Ernest and Maria Emily.

The Victorian gold rush started with the "official" discovery of gold in 1851 and attracted fortune hunters from all over the world. However, Samuel came to Melbourne looking for work as an accountant, and unlike so many others who headed for the Victorian goldfields, he didn't go there in search of gold. In fact, it was the offer of a job with the Ballaarat Gas Company that took the family to the goldfields where in 1860 Samuel was appointed as company secretary.

Samuel Figgis soon became manager of the Ballaarat Gas Company, which was set up in 1858 to supply town gas to the city of Ballarat, and served in that role from 1861 until his death in 1879., He was also secretary of the Ballarat Permanent Investment Society and Building Society, for a lengthy period. And, in the year prior to his death had been appointed as a magistrate for Ballarat.

The original property which Figgis purchased consisted of two adjoining oblong allotments, combining to 2.1 acres, with a lengthy frontage along Havelock Street of 560 feet approx. stretching from Howitt to Gregory Street, Black Hill, which at the time was still referred to as Soldiers Hill. Figgis purchased the land through a sale of Crown land in August 1862 and paid a total of £86 for the two allotments.

William Harold (1846-1932), also an accountant, followed his father as Secretary Manager of the Ballaarat Gas Company until his retirement in 1913. The youngest of the four Figgis boys, Samuel Ernest Figgis (c. 1855–1922), became managing engineer of the Ballaarat Gas Company and then general manager from 1913 to 1915. The brothers were outstanding cricketers and both played for Ballarat vs. Australians at the Eastern Oval, Ballarat in March 1878. W.H. Figgis had played for Ballarat's XXII against W.G.Grace's XI at the same ground in 1874. W.H. caught W.G. to end his first innings of 161. Benjamin Johnstone Figgis and Charles Douglas Figgis also played for the Ballarat XXII against W.G. Grace's X!.

Samuel Ernest was probably the best cricketer of the brothers.

The Figgis residence is referred to as Rehoboth, which supposedly translates from Latin Vulgate as "latitude" or "room". Rehoboth is referred to in the marriage notice of Clara Elizabeth Figgis, the elder daughter of Samuel & Sarah Figgis, to William Reid in 1875,; again, as the residence of Clara and William Reid on the birth of their daughter in 1876; and as Samuel Figgis' address in his obituary. It would seem most likely that the name of their residence was from the Bible, Genesis 26:22 He moved on from there and dug another well, and no one quarreled over it. He named it Rehoboth,[a] saying, “Now the Lord has given us room and we will flourish in the land.”

=== Sarah Figgis (Smith) ===
Samuel Figgis died in Ballarat in September 1879 of pneumonia, he bequeathed all his real and personal estate to his wife Sarah Figgis. The estate was valued at £2,452-17-6, including real estate valued at £600. At the time of Samuel's death, the Figgis were living in Gregory Street, Soldiers Hill, although this may have been just been an alternative address that was used for Rehoboth, which did have one of its frontages on Gregory Street. In an advertisement in The Ballarat Star in 1878, for a nearby property in Howitt Street, reference is made to the "adjoining" residence of Mr. S. Figgis, which would suggest that a number of its street frontages were used to describe the property.

As the property was owned by Samuel Figgis in November 1878, it would seem likely that Rehoboth is the real estate that was left in his will and valued at £600 in September 1879.

As part of the community involvement of the Figgis family, Sarah had been the Honorary Secretary of the Ladies Benevolent Clothing Society in 1880, under the venerable James Oddie.

She died in Geelong, Victoria in September 1893 and was buried with her husband, Samuel, at the Ballarat New Cemetery. She left an estate of £6,256, which didn't include any real estate., as she had sold the property to Robert Ford Bryant in 1887.

=== Robert Ford Bryant – Trelawny ===
The property was purchased by Robert Ford "R.F." Bryant (1841–1908) in May 1887 for £1,150. Both "R.F." and his wife Mary Venning (1843–1921) were born in Cornwall and emigrated to Australia in 1864 on the Winifred. The last entry in his family bible reads: "Left London for Victoria in the ship Winifred on 1 January 1864, amidst the prayers and tears of our parents". Mary gave birth to their son, Robert Ford Bryant (1864–1945), at sea during the voyage.

Bryant, who sat as a Justice of the Peace on the Ballarat Police and City Court benches, was a miner, manager, a Government expert, and a director in the Kangaroo G.M., Australasian and various other mining companies. He also was very involved in the Ballarat Cricket Club, Ballarat Football Club, and keen on raising and showing poultry. During the time he was manager of the Midas Company mine at Clunes, he brought the "Lady Loch" gold nugget (617 ozs.) in to Ballarat for display to the public on 24 August 1897 in the window of Stoddart & Binnie's, stockbrokers.

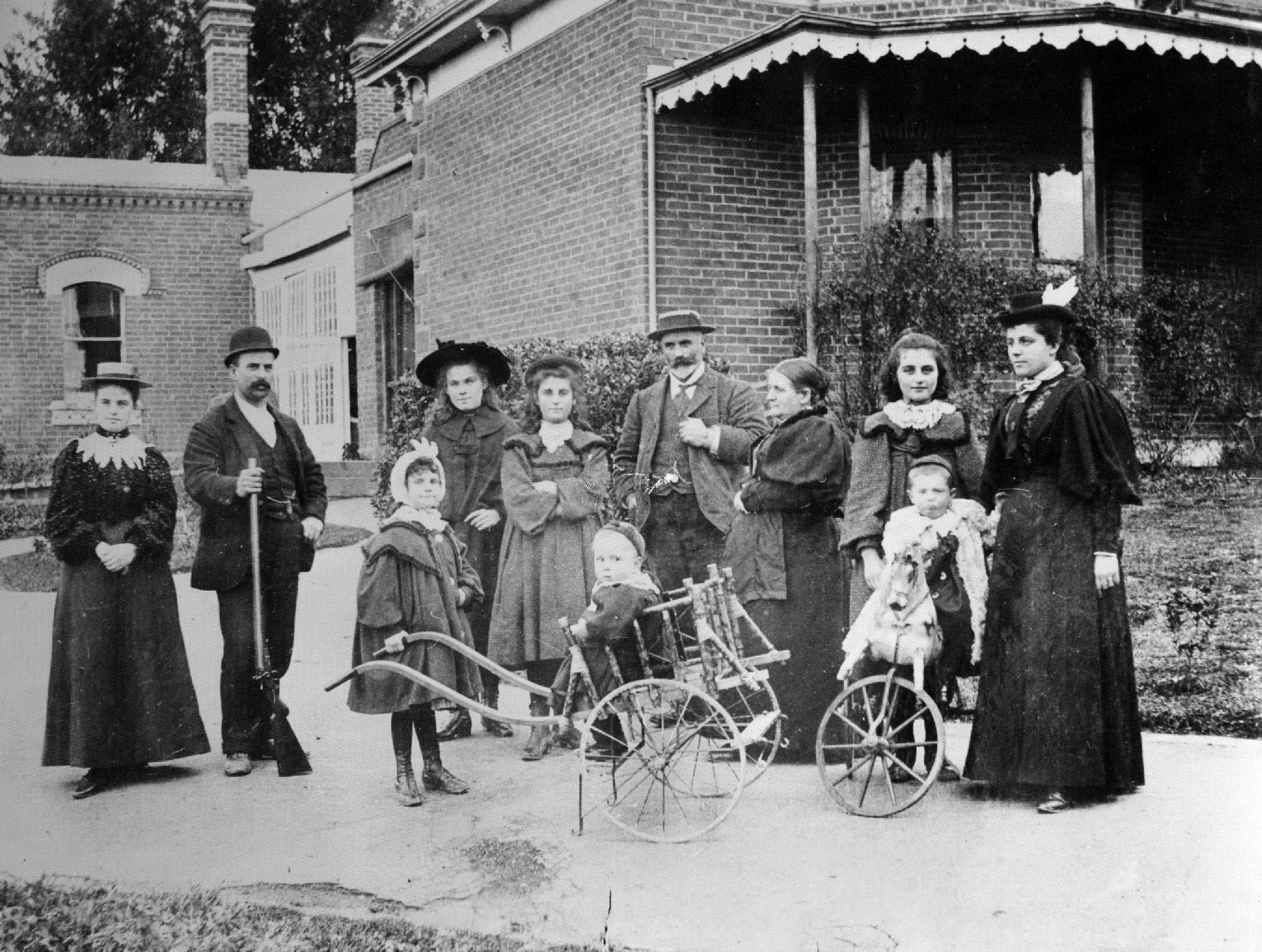
R.F. Bryant & Family at "Trelawny" in 1896

It is likely that the house was named Trelawny by R.F. Bryant after a farm of that name in Cornwall, England, which the family had some connection with, but apparently did not own. Fond memories of the Cornish ballad, Trelawny: The Song Of The Western Men may also have had an effect on the expatriate Cornishman, too.

He embarked on a major renovation of the house and gardens from 1896 to 1900, adding considerably to the house with a new styled verandahs with tessellated tiling, large windows, a grand entrance with stained glass windows, decorated cornices, and increased room sizes. Progressively, he added to what was known as the original "cottage" that was at the back of the house.

His brother, Joseph "Joe" Bryant, had built a gracious home in the area in 1901 to 1905. Esleta, which was to become named Balmoral and then Eyres House, is still standing at 810 Ligar Street, Soldiers Hill, the next street west, parallel to Havelock Street.

=== Mary Bryant (Venning) ===
R.F. Bryant died in 1908 and left his estate to his wife Mary, where her address was referred to as "Trelawny, Peel Street, Ballarat". In a 1902 newspaper notice of the pending marriage of Miss Edith Bryant, daughter of Mr. & Mrs. R.F. Bryant similarly gave the address as Trelawny House, Peel Street North, Ballarat. This seems strange, as Peel Street North does not form any part of the boundaries of the property and only intersects perpendicularly with Gregory Street which is the boundary at the rear of the property.

His estate amounted to "...real estate not exceeding the amount of £700 ..." and personal estate of £160. In the probate documents, Bryant is specifically referred to as "Robert Fourd Bryant (generally known as Robert Ford Bryant)". This seems strange as his mother was Anna Ford (1818–1902) and Bryant named his son, Robert Ford Bryant (1864–1945). Where the spelling "Fourd" came from is not currently known.

=== Winifred Philippa White (Bryant) ===
Trelawny had been put up for auction on 10 February 1909 on the direction of the Executor of R.F. Bryant's estate. The property for sale was described as being 2 1/4 acres freehold land with a "Commodius Family Residence" consisting of a dining room, drawing room, hall, four bedrooms, breakfast room, bathroom, pantry, kitchen, with hot and cold water sources, large underground tank, cellar, three detached rooms, two stall stables, feed room, loft, ranch house, and outbuildings.

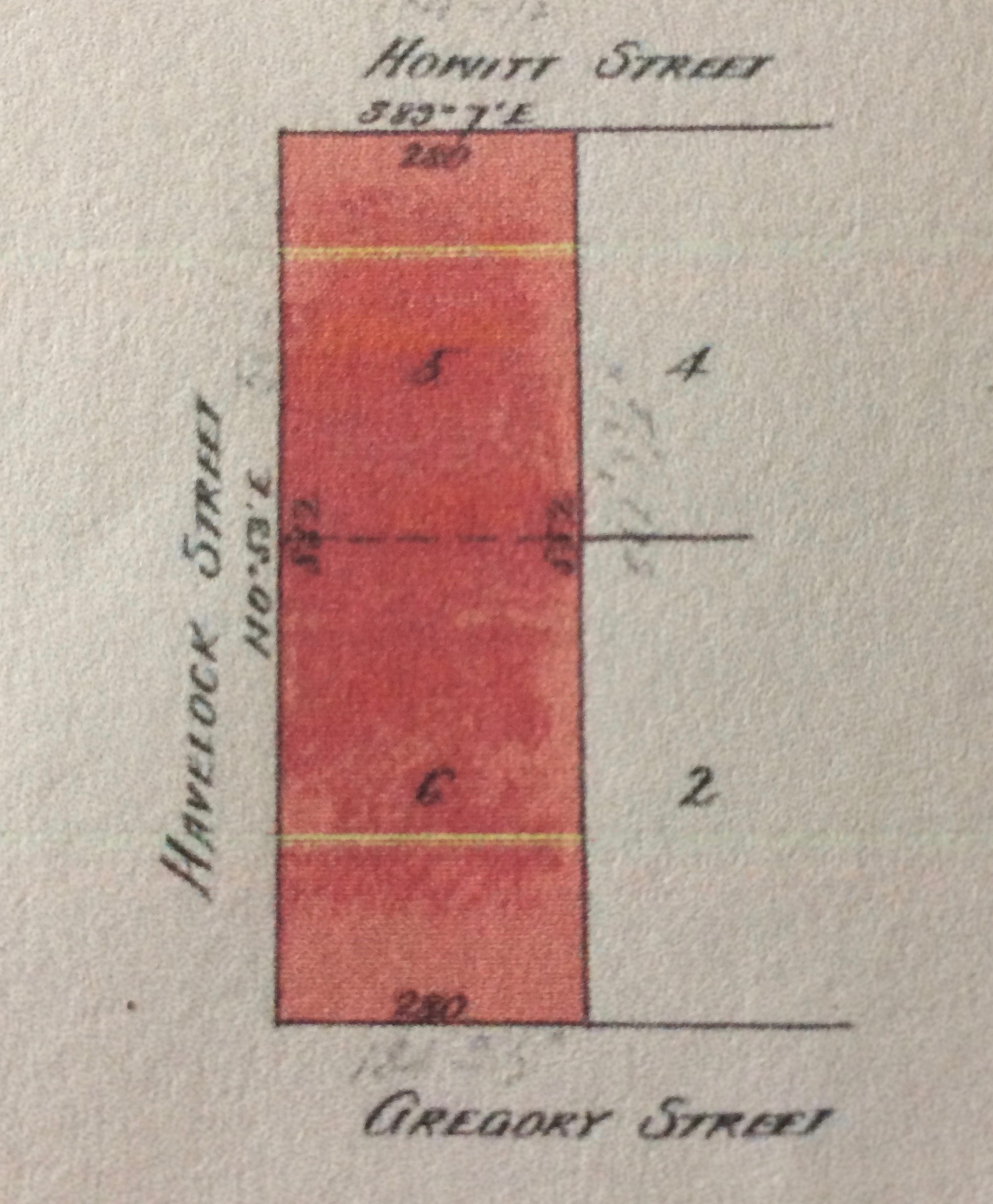
The allotments of the "Trelawny" property in 1909

In 1909 Winifred Philippa White (Bryant) (1882–1963), Married Woman, bought the property from her mother, Mary Bryant.

R.T. and Mary Bryant had 13 children; John Venning Bryant (1862–1940) born in England, Robert Ford Bryant (junior) (1864–1945) born at sea, and her other 11 children being born in Ballarat or Clunes, Victoria. Eight of the Bryant children were alive when their mother, Mary, died in 1921, yet it was only her third youngest child, Winifred, who was interested in buying the family home.

Winifred owned the property from 1909 until she transferred both Allotments 5 & 6 to her younger sister, Elsie Caroline Lemin (Bryant), Married Woman, in 1916.

Winifred and her husband, William White (1874–1931), moved from Ballarat to Finley in New South Wales to farm. William committed suicide in 1931 and Winifred remained in Finley, dying there 35 years later, in 1963. These were particularly hard years for farmers, with almost continual drought, and mouse plagues. The Whites, like many others, had to stand the legs of their tables in buckets of water to prevent the mice from getting up on to where they were eating.

=== Elsie Caroline Lemin (Bryant) ===
Elsie Caroline Bryant (1883–1950), the second youngest child of Robert Ford and Mary Bryant, married Ernest William Lemin (pronounced Le-min) (1882–1945) Stock & Station Agent, in March 1910 at Ballarat, Victoria. They lived at Trelawny and brought up their family there. Ernest was a founder of Midlands Golf Club, originally known as Ballaarat North Golf Club. His son William and daughter Beth were champion golfers and gained local fame by holding the men's and ladies club champion trophies at the same time.

The Whites had made significant renovations and modernisation to the property and gardens. This was a major motivation to Elsie in purchasing the property when Winifred and William White went to farm in Finley, thus keeping Trelawny in the family. Prior to the renovations, Elsie had referred to the house as "... an old barn of a place with lots of rooms ...".

In January 1916 the property held by her sister, Winifred White (Bryant), was transferred to Elsie and she remained the sole proprietor up until her death in October 1950. The probate of her will was granted to her son William Ernest "Bill" Lemin (1912–1930) and son-in-law, Robert Gordon Campbell (1914–1990), who had married her daughter Beth Lemin in 1942 and lived at Trelawny.

=== Beth Campbell (Lemin) & William "Bill" Ernest Lemin ===
Elsie Caroline Lemin died in Ballarat in October 1950.

On 16 January 1952 the property was distributed according to her will and divided into its two original allotments; with Allotment 5, the northern allotment, being transferred to her son, William Ernest Lemin, Clerk, and Allotment 6, the southern allotment, transferred to her daughter, Beth Campbell, Married Woman. The allotments were of similar size and, for some reason currently unknown, the angle of the division between the allotments was slightly altered, to the benefit of the southern allotment, Allotment 6.

On that same day, William Lemin, subdivided the northern allotment, Allotment 5 of one acre and nineteen perches, bordered by the corner of Havelock and Howitt Streets, into six individual housing blocks for sale. This part of the original "Trelanwy" property had been the orchard.

=== Beth Campbell (Lemin) ===
Beth Campbell's property from her mother's will was Allotment 6, the southern allotment or "top paddock", bordered by the corner of Havelock and Gregory Streets, with a 260 feet frontage on Havelock Street, contained Trelawny and its outbuildings.

Her husband, Robert Gordon Campbell, City Valuer, served in the Australian Army, 2nd A.I.F., during World War 2 attaining the rank of Sergeant, having enlisted in 1940 and being discharged in 1946, when his posting on discharge was 2/8 Light Anti-Aircraft Regiment. He served with 8th Battery of the 2/3 Regiment of the Light Anti Aircraft Regiment. He was with The Rats of Tobruk under the Siege of Tobruk which lasted for 8 months, before he was later sent to fight in New Guinea.

Trelawny had a bluestone cellar, which was used in the Summer as a kitchen to avoid the seasonal heat. "The baker, fruiterer, iceman and milkman all delivered to the back door. The grocer came and had a cup of tea while taking his order then he would deliver to the kitchen table." During World War 2, the cellar was closed and converted to a bomb shelter. Under the kitchen is a brick walled well, and evidence has been found on the property of a spring-fed water supply, too.

In the 1970s it was discovered that there were Council plans to straighten the intersection of Peel Street North and Havleock Streets with Gregory Street, effectively removing a large chunk of the Trelawny property and placing the house almost on the roadside. Fortunately, the worth of these plans were reconsidered and did not go ahead.

They had five daughters – Robin Nicholls, Rosemary Campbell, Christine Wilson, Helen Conn and Heather Groeneveld, all née Campbell – who were bequeathed equal shares of their mother's estate. They are great granddaughters of R.F. Bryant and all grew up at Trelawny.

=== Current day ===
The property that had originally been Allotment 6 was subdivided in 1981, creating a housing block on Gregory Street and an access lane to the Trelawny house and outbuildings. This block was coincidentally sold to a family named Bryant, who were not related to the previous owners.

An additional subdivision had been made in 1966 creating a housing block at the corner of Havelock and Gregory Streets, which was retained within the family, being owned by Robin (Campbell) & Greg Nicholls.

Trelawny remains in the family and still maintains much of its long frontage along Havelock Street. Its garden, which was laid out in 1887 by an English relative of the family, Mark Dawe, has been featured in a book – Growing a Garden City: Ballarat Horticultural Society 1859–2009 - "... the incredible story of Ballarat pioneers who cared about the environment and beautified the city. They nurtured and cajoled the urban environment shaping it into a vision splendid. Fortunately some of the vestiges of their toils still remain and Ballarat the Garden City can be proud of their legacy carried forward by the present members. ..."

The garden is also listed in the book, Historic Gardens of Victoria: A Renaissance.

Trelawny continues its gracious presence on Black Hill, behind the privacy of its substantial hedge along its Havelock Street frontage, and is undergoing another round of major renovations. Its 18 feet ceilings are being refurbished, with fancy cornices and ceiling roses restored or replaced, the extensive verandah reconditioned and an interior programme of upgrading room by room to their former grandeur. The original "cottage" part of the house, with its hessian and paper ceilings, will be a later part of the renovations that are underway.
