= Shire of Daylesford and Glenlyon =

Coordinates: 37°21′S 144°09′E

- Local government area
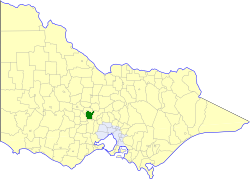
- Location in Victoria
- The Shire of Daylesford and Glenlyon as at its dissolution in 1995
- Country: Australia
- State: Victoria
- Region: Grampians
- Established: 1860
- Council seat: Daylesford

Area
  - Total: 609.3 km^{2} (235.3 sq mi)

Population
  - Total: 5,980 (1992)
  - Density: 9.815/km^{2} (25.420/sq mi)
- County: Talbot
LGAs around Shire of Daylesford and Glenlyon
Newstead	Newstead	Metcalfe
Creswick	Shire of Daylesford and Glenlyon	Kyneton
Bungaree	Ballan	Ballan

The Shire of Daylesford and Glenlyon was a local government area about 110 kilometres (68 mi) northwest of Melbourne, the state capital of Victoria, Australia. The shire covered an area of 609.3 square kilometres (235.3 sq mi), and existed from 1966 until 1995.

== History ==
What became the Shire of Daylesford and Glenlyon had its origins in several different local authorities:

- The Borough of Daylesford was incorporated on 23 September 1859, with an area of 16.23 km^{2} (6.27 sq mi), surrounding the town of Daylesford;
- The Shire of Glenlyon was incorporated on 24 February 1860 as the Glenlyon Road District, and was redesignated as Glenlyon Shire on 12 December 1865;
- The Shire of Mount Franklin was incorporated on 11 May 1860 as the Yandoit & Franklin Road District, and was redesignated as Mt Franklin Shire on 27 January 1871. After the passage of the Local Government Amendment Act 1914, it was found that Mount Franklin did not meet the criteria for a shire, as its rateable income was below £1,500 per annum, so it was absorbed by Glenlyon Shire on 1 October 1915.

On 3 May 1966, an Order in Council united the Borough of Daylesford with the Shire of Glenlyon, to create the new Shire of Daylesford and Glenlyon.

On 20 January 1995, the Shire of Daylesford and Glenlyon was abolished, and along with the Shire of Creswick and parts of the Shires of Kyneton and Talbot and Clunes, was merged into the newly created Shire of Hepburn.

== Wards ==
The Shire of Daylesford and Glenlyon was divided into four ridings on 31 May 1966, each of which elected three councillors:

- Daylesford Riding
- Glenlyon Riding
- Hepburn Riding
- Mount Franklin Riding

== Towns and localities ==
West (Mount Franklin)

- Basalt
- Clydesdale
- Daylesford*
- Eganstown
- Franklinford
- Hepburn
- Hepburn Springs
- Leonards Hill
- Mount Franklin
- Musk
- Musk Vale
- Sailors Falls
- Shepherds Flat
- Yandoit

East (Glenlyon)

- Bullarto
- Coomoora
- Denver
- Drummond
- Glenlyon
- Jubilee Lake
- Little Hampton
- Lyonville
- Porcupine Ridge
- Springs Reserve
- Victoria Park
- Wheatsheaf

* Council seat.

== Population ==
Year	Population
1954	5,489
1958	5,670*
1961	4,645
1966	4,396
1971	4,105
1976	3,971
1981	4,300
1986	4,988
1991	5,679

* Estimate in 1958 Victorian Year Book.

== Gallery ==
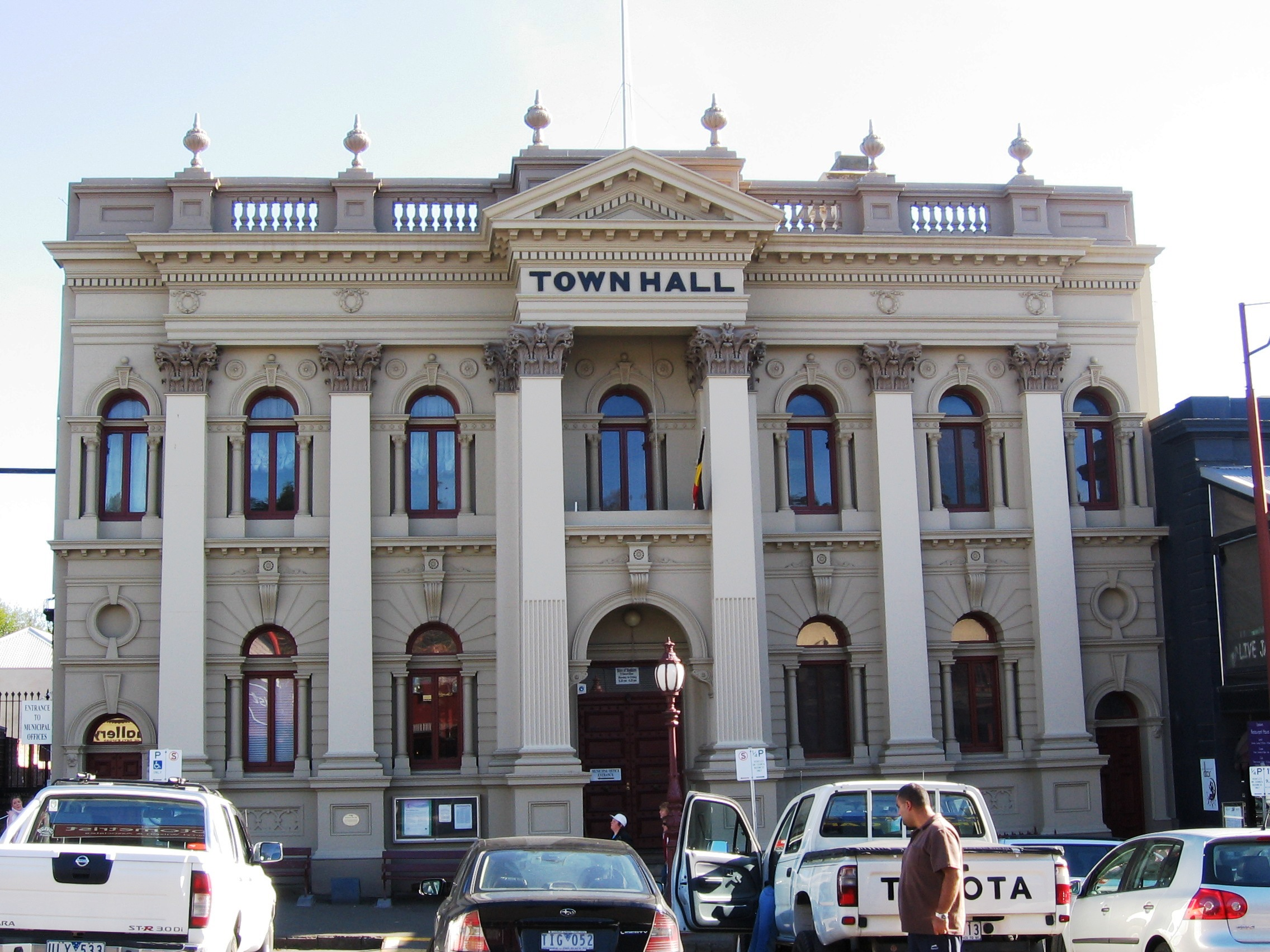
The Town Hall in Daylesford, built in 1867 for the Borough of Daylesford.

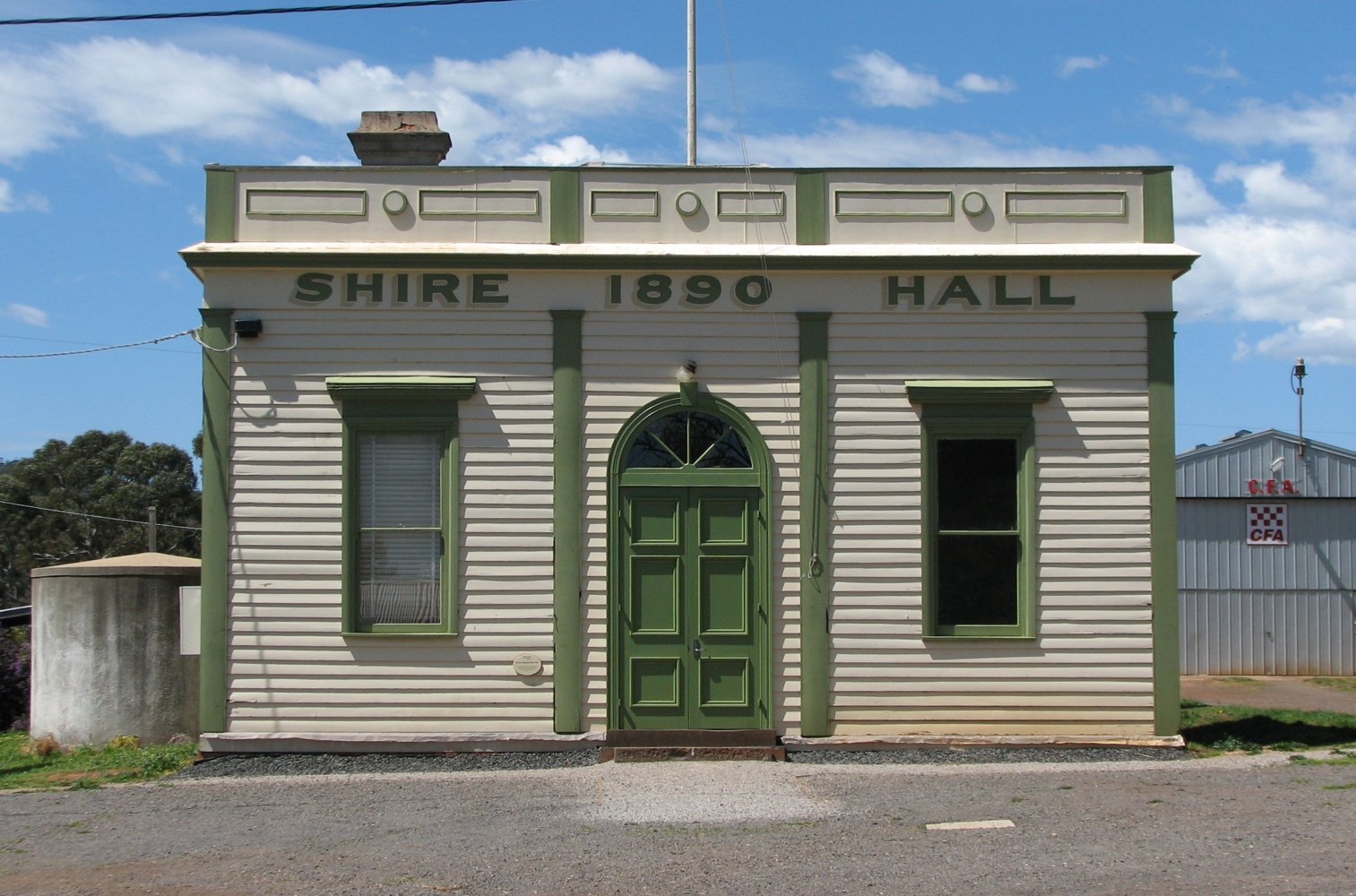
The Shire Hall in Glenlyon, built in 1890 for the Shire of Glenlyon.
