= Shire of Creswick =

Coordinates: 37°26′S 143°54′E

- Local government area
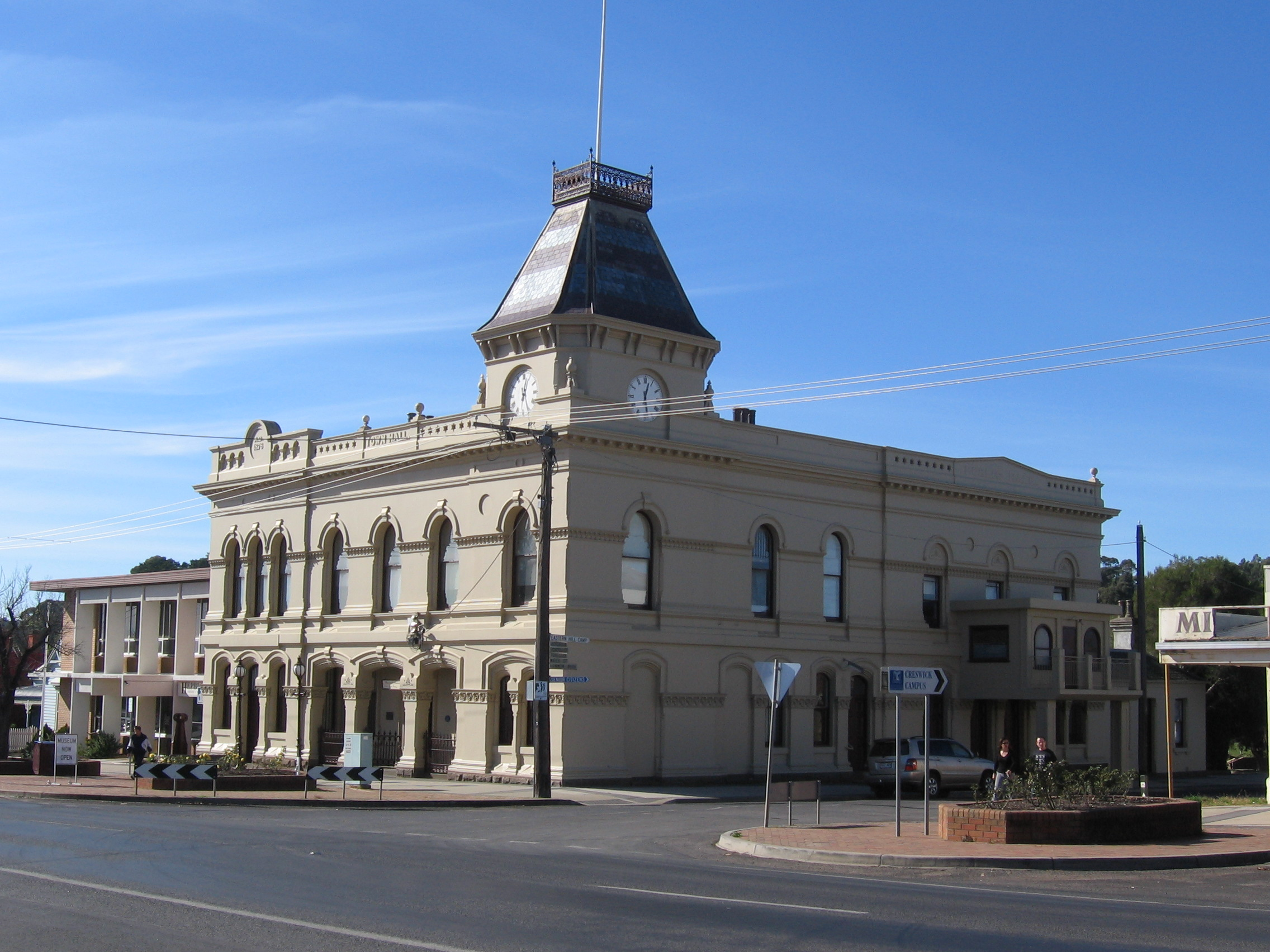
- Former town hall at Creswick

- The Shire of Creswick as at its dissolution in 1995
- Country: Australia
- State: Victoria
- Region: Grampians
- Established: 1859
- Council seat: Creswick

Area
  - Total: 551.66 km^{2} (213.00 sq mi)

Population
  - Total(s): 4,870 (1992)
  - Density: 8.828/km^{2} (22.864/sq mi)
- County: Talbot
LGAs around Shire of Creswick
Talbot and Clunes	Newstead	Newstead
Talbot and Clunes	Shire of Creswick	Daylesford and Glenlyon
Ballarat	Bungaree	Ballan

The Shire of Creswick was a local government area about 120 kilometres (75 mi) west-northwest of Melbourne, the state capital of Victoria, Australia. The shire covered an area of 551.66 square kilometres (213.0 sq mi), and existed from 1859 until 1995.

== History ==
Creswick was first incorporated as a road district on 11 January 1859, and became a shire on 31 December 1863. The Borough of Creswick, incorporated on 19 November 1858 with an area of 19.26 square kilometres (4,759 acres), was united with the shire on 29 May 1934.

On 20 January 1995, the Shire of Creswick was abolished, and along with the Shire of Daylesford and Glenlyon and parts of the Shires of Kyneton and Talbot and Clunes, was merged into the newly created Shire of Hepburn.

== Wards ==
The Shire of Creswick was divided into four ridings, each of which elected three councillors:

- Creswick Riding
- North Creswick Riding
- Northeast Riding
- South Riding

== Towns and localities ==
- Allendale
- Broomfield
- Blampied
- Cabbage Tree
- Campbelltown
- Creswick*
- Creswick North
- Dean
- Glengower
- Kangaroo Hills
- Kingston
- Kooroocheang
- Lawrence
- Mollongghip
- Moorookyle
- Mount Prospect
- Newlyn
- Rockyn
- Smeaton
- Springmount
- Ullina
- Wattle Flat

* Council seat.

== Population ==
Year	Population
1954	3,554
1958	3,690*
1961	3,587
1966	3,540
1971	3,414
1976	3,923
1981	3,943
1986	4,482
1991	4,836

* Estimate in 1958 Victorian Year Book.
