= Drummond North =

- Town
- Coordinates: 37°12′0″S 144°17′0″E
- Country: Australia
- State: Victoria
- LGAs: Shire of Hepburn; Mount Alexander Shire
- Location: 100 km (62 mi) from Melbourne; 60 km (37 mi) from Bendigo; 72 km (45 mi) from Ballarat

Government
  - State electorate: Macedon
  - Federal division: Bendigo
- Elevation: 535 m (1,755 ft)

Population
  - Total: 187 (2016 census)
- Postcode: 3446
Localities around Drummond North
Vaughan	Taradale	Malmsbury
Glenluce	Drummond North	Malmsbury
Glenluce	Denver	Drummond

Drummond North is a locality in the Shire of Hepburn and Mount Alexander Shire, Victoria, Australia. The locality is mainly a wine-growing and livestock region. Back Creek, a tributary of the Coliban River, runs through the locality, creating a 30-degree hill. Native wildlife includes kangaroos which are plentiful in number. Drummond North Post Office opened on 1 April 1885 and closed in 1956. At the 2016 census, Drummond North had a population of 187.
