= Shire of Hepburn =

Coordinates: 37°18′50″S 144°08′16″E

Hepburn Shire Council
- Local government area
- Location in Victoria

- Interactive map of Hepburn Shire Council
- Country: Australia
- State: Victoria
- Region: Grampians
- Established: 1995
- Council seat: Daylesford

Government
  - Mayor: Tony Clark
  - State electorates: Macedon; Ripon
  - Federal division: Ballarat

Area
  - Total: 1,473 km^{2} (569 sq mi)

Population
  - Total: 16,604 (2021)
  - Density: 11.272/km^{2} (29.195/sq mi)
- Gazetted: 19 January 1995
- Website: Hepburn Shire Council
LGAs around Hepburn Shire Council
Central Goldfields	Mount Alexander	Mount Alexander
Pyrenees	Hepburn Shire Council	Macedon Ranges
Ballarat	Moorabool	Macedon Ranges

The Shire of Hepburn is a local government area in Victoria, Australia. Located in the central part of the state, it covers an area of 1,473 square kilometres (569 mi^{2}). The 2021 census recorded a population of 16,604 in the shire.

Notable settlements include Clunes, Creswick, Daylesford, Hepburn Springs, Trentham, Allendale, Denver, Glenlyon, Kingston, Leonards Hill, Lyonville, Newlyn and Smeaton.

The shire is governed and administered by the Hepburn Shire Council; its seat of local government and administrative centre is located at the council headquarters in Daylesford. It also has a service centre located in Creswick. The shire is named after an early squatter named John Hepburn, who established the Smeaton Hill pastoral run, which was located a few kilometres north of present-day Creswick.

== History ==
The Shire of Hepburn was formed in 1995 from the amalgamation of the Shire of Creswick, Shire of Daylesford and Glenlyon, the Trentham district of the Shire of Kyneton, and the Clunes district of the Shire of Talbot and Clunes.

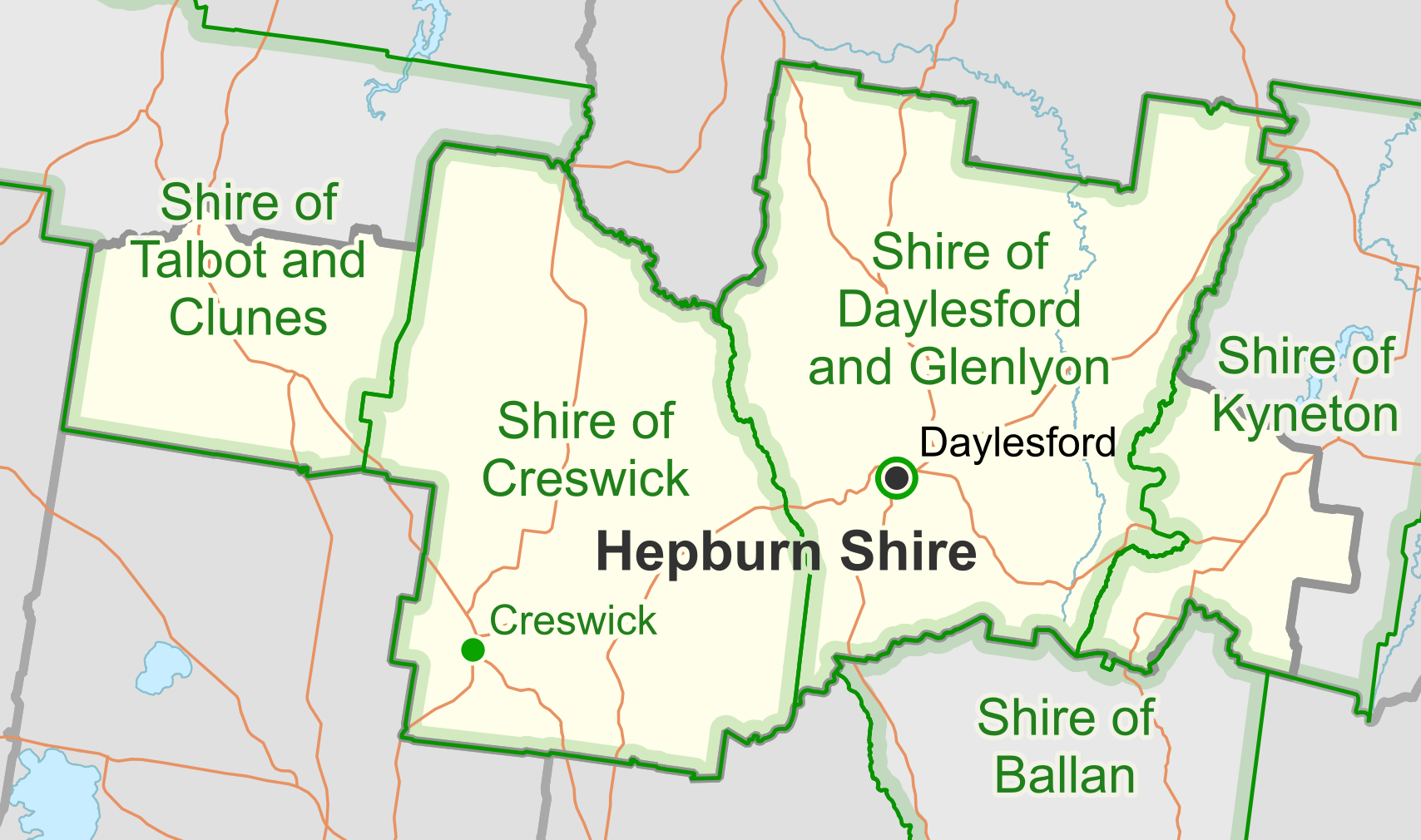
Hepburn Shire's predecessor LGAs (green) as they were in 1994. The administrative centres of the former LGAs are marked by green dots.

== Council ==
=== Current composition ===
The council is composed of seven councillors, the councillors are:

Ward	Party	Councillor	Notes
	Independent	Pat Hockey	
	Independent	Lesley Hewitt	
	Independent	Shirley Cornish	
	Independent	Brian Hood	
	Independent	Don Henderson	
	Greens	Tim Drylie	
	Independent	Tony Clark	

=== Administration and governance ===
The council meets in the council chambers at the council headquarters in the Daylesford Municipal Offices, which is also the location of the council's administrative activities. It also provides customer services at both its administrative centre in Daylesford, and its service centre in Creswick.

== Election results ==
=== 2024 ===
2024 Victorian local elections: Hepburn
Party	Candidate	Votes	%	±%
Independent	Don Henderson (elected 1)	2,440	23.48	
Independent	Brian Hood (elected 2)	1,540	14.82	
Independent	Lesley Hewitt (elected 3)	1,079	10.38	
Greens	Tim Drylie (elected 5)	963	9.27	
Independent	Pat Hockey (elected 6)	768	7.39	
Independent	Tony Clark (elected 4)	660	6.35	
Independent	Shirley Cornish (elected 7)	618	5.95	
Independent	Christian Porochowsky	537	5.17	
Independent	Derek Sedgman	492	4.73	
Independent	Cameron Stone	438	4.21	
Independent	Bernie Winfield-Gray	434	4.18	
Independent	Benny Pettersson	423	4.07	
Total formal votes		10,392	94.29	
Informal votes		629	5.71	
Turnout		11,021	83.30	

== Townships and localities ==
At the 2021 census, the shire had a population of 16,604, up from 15,330 at the 2016 census census.

Population
Locality	2016	2021
Allendale	166	185
Bald Hills^	107	114
Basalt	10	23
Blampied	212	237
Broomfield	228	213
Bullarook^	99	77
Bullarto	73	89
Bullarto South^	33	48
Bung Bong^	51	63
Cabbage Tree	18	10
Campbelltown^	55	51
Clunes	1,728	1,844
Clydesdale	58	62
Coomoora	252	308
Creswick^	3,170	3,279
Creswick North	58	55
Daylesford	2,548	2,781
Dean	120	132
Denver^	150	148
Drummond^	283	294
Drummond North^	187	203
Dry Diggings	25	41
Eganstown	203	206
Elevated Plains	37	39
Evansford^	131	147
Fern Hill^	104	125
Franklinford^	66	71
Glengower^	13	15
Glenlyon	389	431
Guildford^	333	330
Hepburn	599	631
Hepburn Springs	329	368
Kingston	177	190
Kooroocheang	28	41
Korweinguboora^	168	196
Langdons Hill	21	23
Lawrence	17	8
Leonards Hill	45	47
Lillicur^	29	85
Little Hampton	62	74
Lyonville	175	189
Malmsbury^	831	905
Mollongghip^	89	105
Mount Beckworth	9	15
Mount Cameron^	9	15
Mount Franklin	89	99
Mount Prospect	41	41
Musk	150	177
Musk Vale	132	170
Newbury	71	84
Newlyn	128	136
Newlyn North	174	230
North Blackwood	51	50
Porcupine Ridge	122	149
Rocklyn	62	43
Sailors Falls	62	79
Sailors Hill	81	72
Shepherds Flat	66	71
Smeaton	231	245
Smokeytown	31	32
Spring Hill^	198	200
Springmount	181	184
Stony Creek	6	0
Strangways^	87	101
Sulky^	232	234
Taradale^	448	524
Tarilta^	21	26
Trentham^	1,180	1,382
Trentham East^	153	181
Tylden^	535	645
Tylden South	*	#
Ullina	34	25
Wattle Flat^	97	104
Waubra^	275	308
Werona^	46	43
Wheatsheaf	241	252
Yandoit	154	181

^ - Territory divided with another LGA
* - Not noted in 2016 Census
# - Not noted in 2021 Census

== Traditional owners ==
The traditional owners of the Shire of Hepburn are the Dja Dja Wurrung.

== See also ==
- List of places of worship in Hepburn Shire
