= Trentham, Victoria =

Trentham
- Town
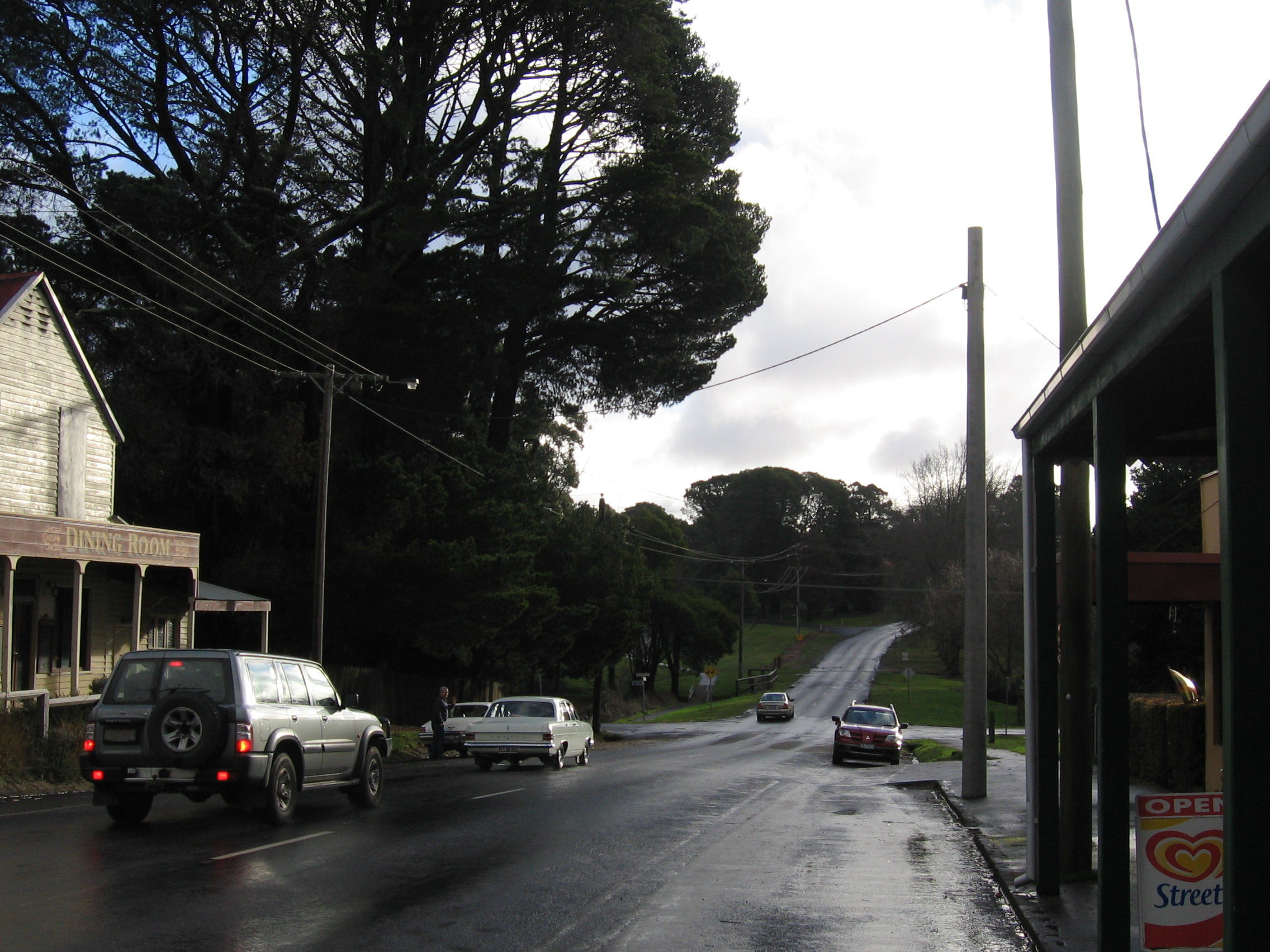
- High Street

- Interactive map of Trentham
- Coordinates: 37°23′0″S 144°19′0″E
- Country: Australia
- State: Victoria
- LGAs: Shire of Hepburn; Shire of Moorabool
- Location: 22 km (14 mi) SW of Kyneton; 24 km (15 mi) E of Daylesford; 69 km (43 mi) NE of Ballarat; 87 km (54 mi) NW of Melbourne

Government
  - State electorate: Macedon
  - Federal division: Ballarat
- Elevation: 700 m (2,300 ft)

Population
  - Total: 1,180 (2016 census)
- Postcode: 3458
- Mean max temp: 15.6 °C (60.1 °F)
- Mean min temp: 7.0 °C (44.6 °F)
- Annual rainfall: 1,110.9 mm (43.74 in)
Localities around Trentham
Little Hampton	Spring Hill	Tylden; Tylden South
Lyonville	Trentham	Fern Hill; Trentham East
Newbury	Blackwood	North Blackwood

Trentham is a town in the Shire of Hepburn and Shire of Moorabool local government area of West Central Victoria, Australia. At the 2016 census, Trentham had a population of 1180, with a median age of 55 years. Located at an altitude of 700 metres (2,297 ft), the town is 87 kilometres (54 miles) north-west of Melbourne. The Trentham area is located on the traditional lands of the Dja Dja Wurrung Aboriginal people.

== History ==
Although pastoral runs were taken up in the area as early as 1838, Trentham was first settled by gold prospectors in the 1850s and later developed for its timber resources from the surrounding Wombat State Forest. The Post Office opened on 16 July 1862.

The railway arrived in 1880. At its peak, it carried up to 21,000 tonnes of freight annually, mostly timber. Two timber tramways once ran to the station from the surrounding forests and, in the early 20th century, there was a timber mill adjoining the station yard. In 1972 "Dr Gwen" died after serving the town for over 30 years. A grateful public had a clock installed in her memory.

The railway was closed in 1978 after better roads were built in the 1950s. The station now houses the Trentham Agricultural and Railway Museum. The station building has been restored, the platform is in good condition and the yard is mainly intact and includes some rolling stock.

The township experiences large influxes of non-migratory birds, notably pelicans and falcons, which has led to them featuring on the town's crest and motto "Tu falco agitare et cum Pelicanis volare", roughly transcribed from Latin as "to drive a falcon and fly with pelicans".

Due to a fertile strip of red volcanic soil, grazing, tourism and potato growing became the mainstays of the town's economy.

== Climate ==
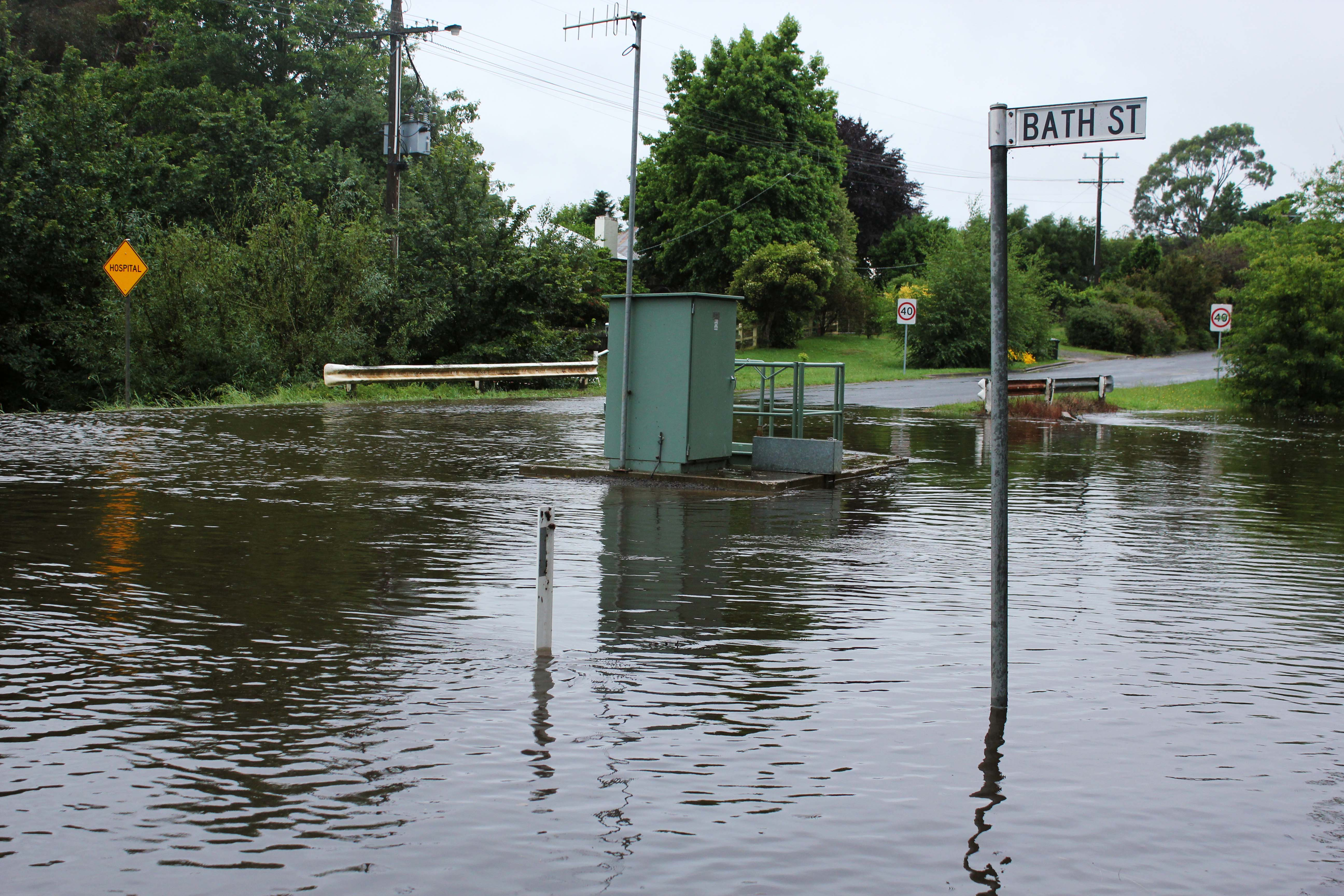
Bath Street, Trentham during the summer 2011 floods.

The climate is cool and damp for much of the year: the mean maximum in high summer (February) is 23.2 °C, minima fall to around 11.8 °C; whereas winters are distinctly cold with the mean maximum temperature 7.8 °C (July) and mean minimum, 2.5 °C. The coldest temperature recorded was –6.0 °C (not particularly low due to heavy cloud cover); sleet and snow are common in winter, with an average of 7.8 snowy days per annum. By mean maximum temperature, it is the coldest proper town in Victoria; only the isolated rural localities of Tolmie and Aberfeldy are colder.

Trentham has an average annual precipitation of 1110.9 mm; the highest single-day rainfall was 154.9 mm, and the highest monthly rainfall was 317.5 mm. The region has a distinct winter rainfall maximum. Rainfall occurs through the summer but tends to be more erratic and unreliable, often occurring in heavy thunderstorms associated with cold fronts.

Climate data for Trentham (695 m AMSL; 37.37° S, 144.31° E)
Month	Jan	Feb	Mar	Apr	May	Jun	Jul	Aug	Sep	Oct	Nov	Dec	Year
Record high °C (°F)	39.4 (102.9)	38.2 (100.8)	36.1 (97.0)	29.1 (84.4)	23.9 (75.0)	16.9 (62.4)	18.3 (64.9)	22.5 (72.5)	25.0 (77.0)	30.6 (87.1)	37.0 (98.6)	37.2 (99.0)	39.4 (102.9)
Mean daily maximum °C (°F)	23.0 (73.4)	23.2 (73.8)	20.0 (68.0)	15.4 (59.7)	11.4 (52.5)	8.6 (47.5)	7.8 (46.0)	9.4 (48.9)	12.1 (53.8)	15.8 (60.4)	18.9 (66.0)	21.7 (71.1)	15.6 (60.1)
Mean daily minimum °C (°F)	11.2 (52.2)	11.8 (53.2)	10.0 (50.0)	7.5 (45.5)	5.5 (41.9)	3.5 (38.3)	2.5 (36.5)	3.1 (37.6)	4.4 (39.9)	6.4 (43.5)	8.1 (46.6)	9.8 (49.6)	7.0 (44.6)
Record low °C (°F)	0.0 (32.0)	2.2 (36.0)	0.5 (32.9)	−2.0 (28.4)	−2.8 (27.0)	−6.0 (21.2)	−6.0 (21.2)	−4.2 (24.4)	−5.9 (21.4)	−2.5 (27.5)	−3.0 (26.6)	−1.0 (30.2)	−6.0 (21.2)
Average precipitation mm (inches)	56.7 (2.23)	47.1 (1.85)	56.9 (2.24)	83.2 (3.28)	116.1 (4.57)	113.4 (4.46)	143.9 (5.67)	137.0 (5.39)	108.3 (4.26)	111.0 (4.37)	72.4 (2.85)	64.7 (2.55)	1,110.9 (43.74)
Average precipitation days (≥ 0.2mm)	7.4	7.0	8.8	10.4	13.7	15.0	16.4	16.1	14.4	13.3	10.4	9.2	142.1
Average afternoon relative humidity (%)	51	49	51	60	73	80	76	72	70	62	57	55	63
Source 1: Macedon Forestry (1887–1999)
Source 2: Trentham (1878–2021)

== Events and attractions ==
Near Trentham is Trentham Falls on the Coliban River, the highest single-drop waterfall in Victoria. There are also several mineral springs near the town.

The annual Great Trentham Spudfest has been running since 2008, celebrating Trentham's potato-growing heritage.

The town has an Australian Rules football team, the Trentham Saints, competing in the Maryborough Castlemaine District Football League.

The Trentham Golf Club is on Falls Road.
