= Vic Hutchens =

Australian rules footballer

Personal information
- Full name: Benjamin Victor Hutchins
- Born: 31 August 1876; Kingston, Victoria
- Died: 8 November 1964 (aged 88); Geelong, Victoria

Playing career^{1}
Years	Club	Games (Goals)
1902	Essendon	11 (8)
- ^{1} Playing statistics correct to the end of 1902.

Vic Hutchens (31 August 1876 – 8 November 1964) was an Australian rules footballer who played with Essendon in the Victorian Football League (VFL).
