= Lance Mounsey =

Australian rules footballer

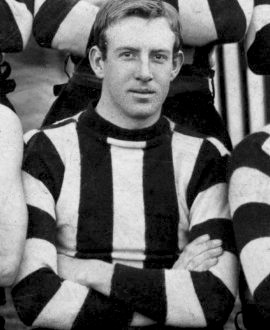
- Mounsey in 1912

Personal information
- Full name: John Lancelot Mounsey
- Born: 2 June 1890; Allendale, Victoria
- Died: 21 March 1970 (aged 79); Ascot Vale, Victoria
- Original team: Clifton Hill
- Height: 177 cm (5 ft 10 in)
- Weight: 78 kg (172 lb)

Playing career^{1}
Years	Club	Games (Goals)
1912	Collingwood	4 (0)
- ^{1} Playing statistics correct to the end of 1912.

John Lancelot Mounsey (2 June 1890 – 21 March 1970) was an Australian rules footballer who played with Collingwood in the Victorian Football League (VFL).
