= Ern Williamson =

Australian rules footballer

Personal information
- Full name: Ernest Stanley Williamson
- Born: 26 May 1880; Guildford, Victoria
- Died: 16 December 1967 (aged 87); Elsternwick, Victoria
- Original team: Kerang

Playing career^{1}
Years	Club	Games (Goals)
1906	St Kilda	5 (0)
- ^{1} Playing statistics correct to the end of 1906.

Ernest Stanley Williamson (26 May 1880 – 16 December 1967) was an Australian rules footballer who played with St Kilda in the Victorian Football League (VFL).
