= Shepherds Flat =

- Town
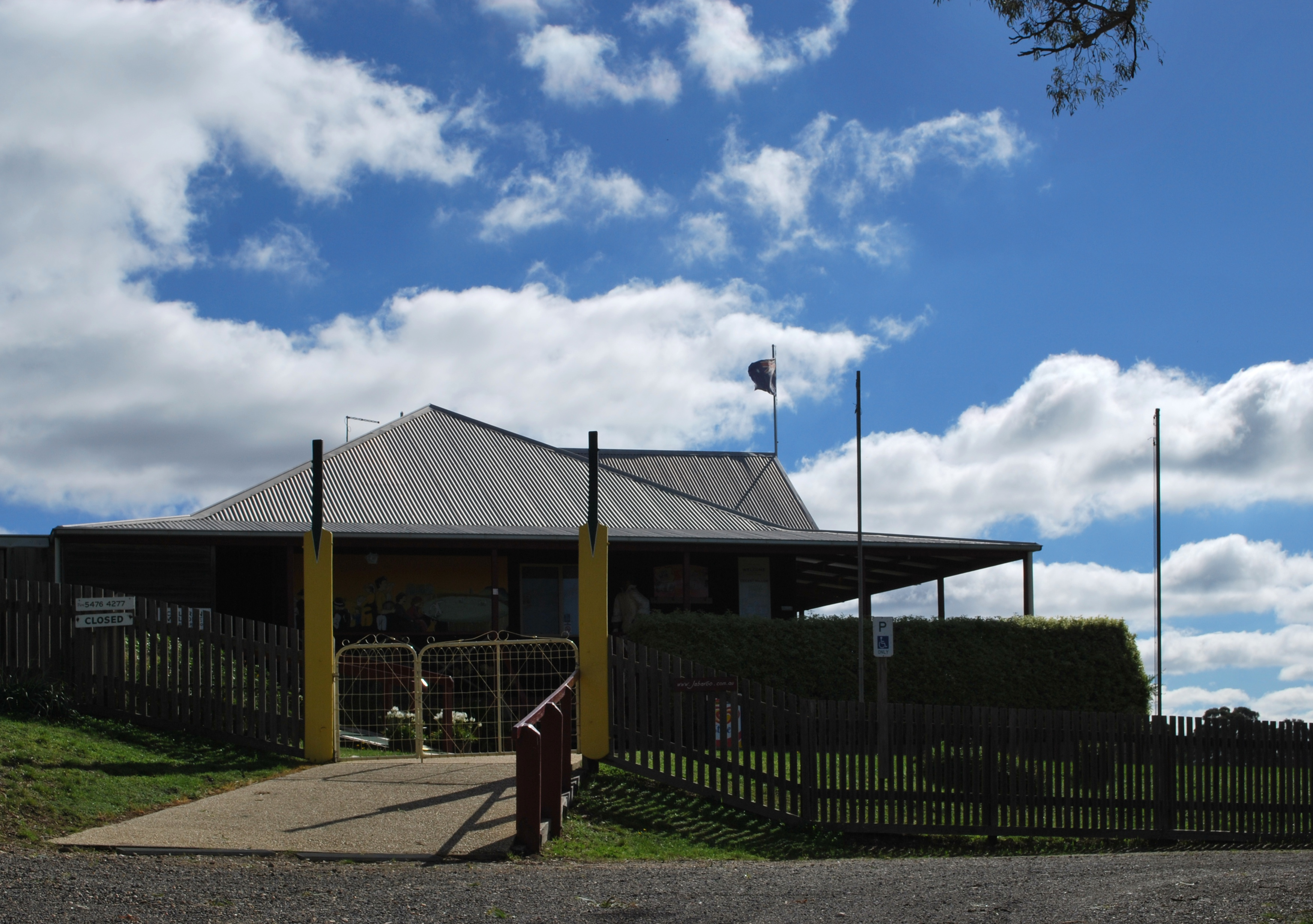
- The Cricket Willow Cafe at Shepherds Flat

- Coordinates: 37°16′17″S 144°6′31″E
- Country: Australia
- State: Victoria
- LGA: Shire of Hepburn
- Location: 122 km (76 mi) NW of Melbourne; 11 km (6.8 mi) N of Daylesford

Government
  - State electorate: Macedon
  - Federal division: Ballarat

Population
  - Total: 71 (2021 census)
- Postcode: 3461

Shepherds Flat is a locality in the Shire of Hepburn, Victoria, Australia, 122 kilometres (76 mi) north west of the state capital, Melbourne. At the 2021 census, Shepherds Flat had a population of 66.

== History ==
Shepherds Flat was first settled by Swiss Italian migrants in the 1850s during the Victorian Gold Rush. Today, the main thoroughfare is the Hepburn-Newstead Road which, despite its name, runs between Hepburn and Franklinford.

Shepherds Flat holds historical significance as the home of one of Australia's first cricket-bat willow farms. The origin of this farm can be traced back to an exchange during a 1902 Ashes Test at the Melbourne Cricket Ground, where umpire Robert Crockett lamented to England captain Archie MacLaren that Australia did not cultivate its own bat willow.

MacLaren promptly sent Six Salix alba 'Caerulea' cuttings in a thermos, which arrived six months later. One cutting survived; planted in a plot adjacent to Bald Hill Creek. The farm was run by Robert Crockett and his brother, James. Seven of Don Bradman's famously unbeaten 1948 Ashes team (dubbed "the Invincibles") used bats made from Crockett's willow. The farm was bought by Dunlop Slazenger in the 1960s, and later acquired by local Ian Tinetti, who established a museum named Cricket Willow adjacent to the Crockett farm.
