= Werona =

Werona Victoria
- Coordinates: 37°14′39″S 144°1′23″E
- Population: 43 (2021 census)
- Postcode(s): 3364
- LGA(s): Shire of Mount Alexander; Shire of Hepburn
- State electorate(s): Bendigo West; Ripon
- Federal division(s): Bendigo; Ballarat

Werona is a locality in the Shire of Hepburn and the Shire of Mount Alexander, Victoria, Australia. At the 2021 census, Werona had a population of 43.
