= Glenluce, Victoria =

Glenluce Victoria
- Coordinates: 37°10′58″S 144°14′17″E
- Population: 17 (2021 census)
- Postcode(s): 3451
- LGA(s): Shire of Mount Alexander
- State electorate(s): Macedon
- Federal division(s): Bendigo

Glenluce is a locality in the Shire of Mount Alexander, Victoria, Australia. At the 2021 census, Glenluce had a population of 17.
