= Tarilta =

Tarilta Victoria
- Coordinates: 37°10′39″S 144°11′28″E
- Population: 26 (2021 census)
- Postcode(s): 3451
- LGA(s): Shire of Mount Alexander; Shire of Hepburn
- State electorate(s): Macedon
- Federal division(s): Bendigo; Ballarat

Tarilta is a locality in the Shire of Hepburn and the Shire of Mount Alexander, Victoria, Australia. At the 2021 census, Tarilta had a population of 26.

== History ==
Tarilta, originally known as Kangaroo Flat, emerged following the discovery of gold near the junction of Kangaroo Creek and the Loddon River in 1853. A school was established in 1860 within a Wesleyan chapel, and the township was officially surveyed and named Tarilta in 1864, a name believed to derive from a Djadjawurrung word meaning "kangaroo." By 1865, Bailliere’s Victorian Gazetteer described Tarilta as a gold-mining town featuring both alluvial and quartz operations, with three quartz-crushing mills, three horse-puddling machines, and two hotels. Tarilta’s elevated location was accessible only by horse-drawn dray or horseback, including via the Cobb and Co mail service.
