= North Blackwood =

- Town
- Coordinates: 37°25′0″S 144°22′0″E
- Country: Australia
- State: Victoria
- LGA(s): Shire of Hepburn

Government
  - State electorate(s): Macedon
  - Federal division(s): Ballarat

Population
  - Total(s): 51 (2016 census)
- Postcode: 3461

North Blackwood is a locality of the Shire of Hepburn, Victoria, Australia. At the 2016 census, it had a population of 51.

North Blackwood Post Office opened on 10 August 1909, was renamed Waldron in 1910 and closed in that year.

This town is not to be confused with Barrys Reef.
