= Trentham East =

- Town
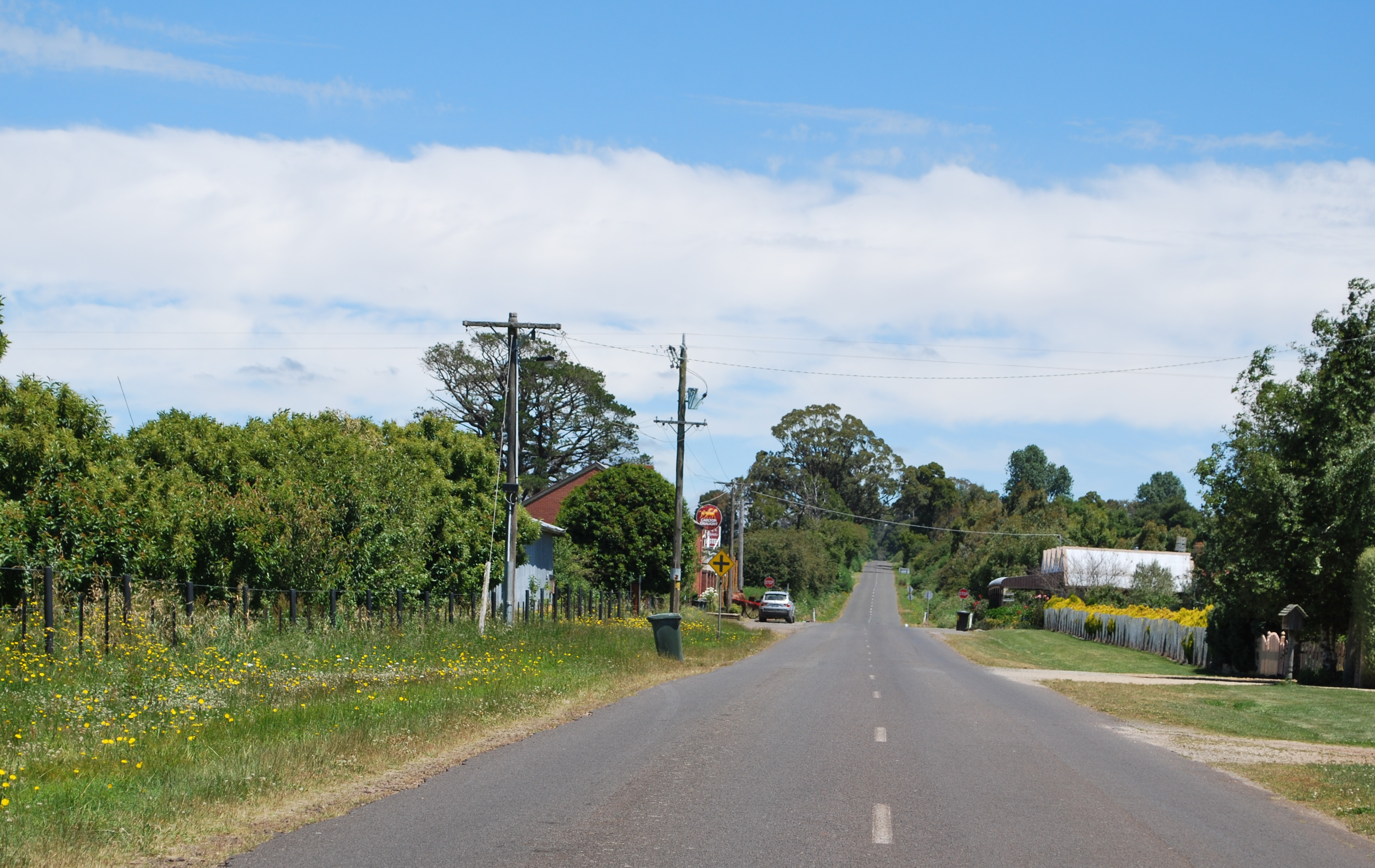
- Trentham East, 2011. The Pig and Whistle Hotel can be seen to the left

- Coordinates: 37°23′31″S 144°22′57″E
- Country: Australia
- State: Victoria
- LGA: Shire of Macedon Ranges
- Location: 87 km (54 mi) NW of Melbourne; 17 km (11 mi) W of Woodend; 7 km (4.3 mi) E of Trentham

Government
  - State electorate: Macedon
  - Federal divisions: Bendigo; Ballarat

Population
  - Total: 153 (2016 census)
- Postcode: 3458

Trentham East is a locality in central Victoria, Australia. The locality is in the Shire of Macedon Ranges local government area, 87 kilometres (54 mi) north west of the state capital, Melbourne.

At the 2016 census, Trentham East had a population of 153.
