= Sailors Falls =

- Town
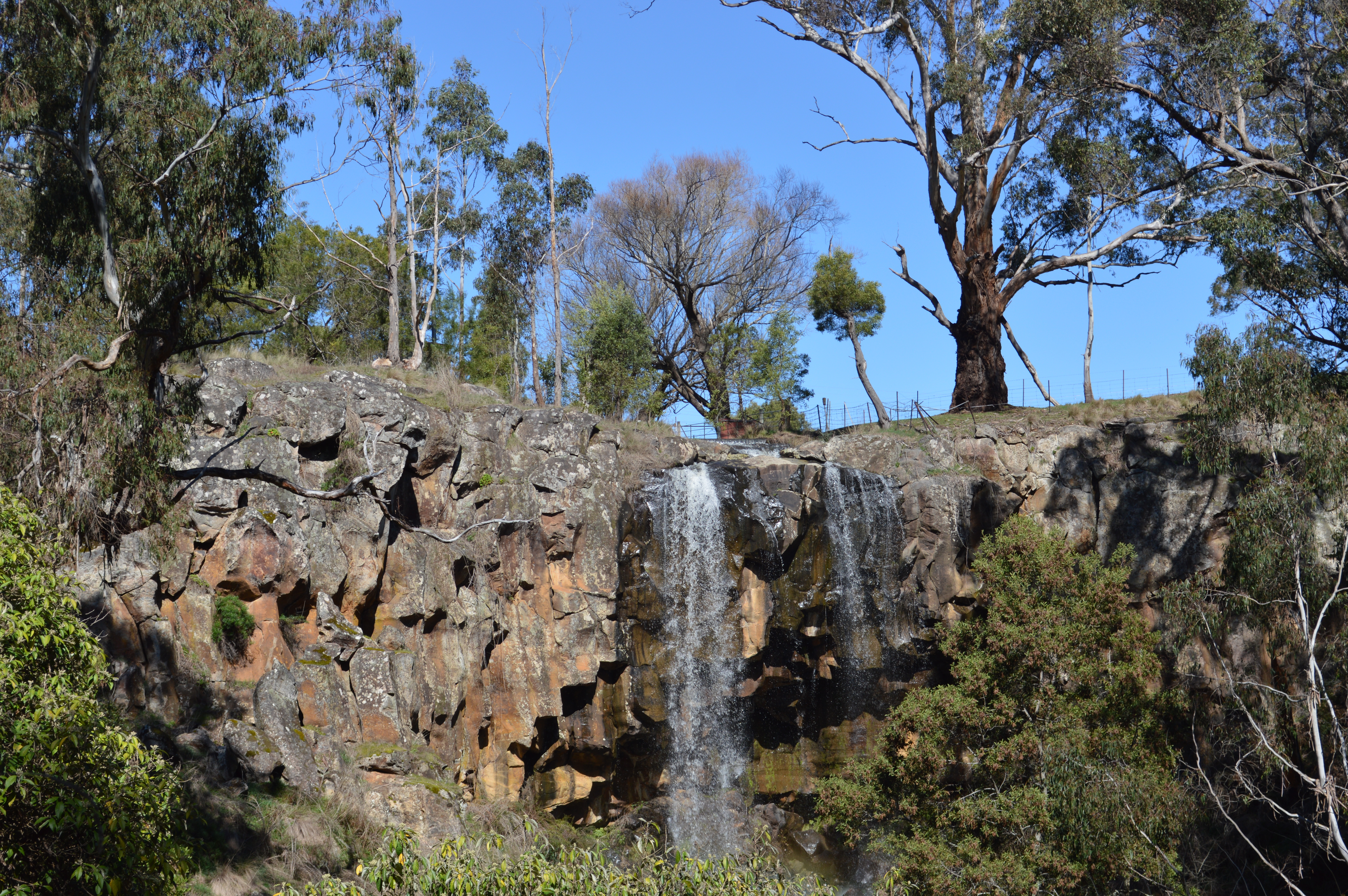
- The eponymous Sailors Falls, at Sailors Falls

- Coordinates: 37°23′25″S 144°7′12″E
- Country: Australia
- State: Victoria
- LGA: Shire of Hepburn
- Location: 108 km (67 mi) NW of Melbourne; 41 km (25 mi) NE of Ballarat; 8 km (5.0 mi) 8 of Daylesford

Government
  - State electorate: Macedon
  - Federal division: Ballarat

Population
  - Total: 62 (2016 census)
- Postcode: 3461

Sailors Falls is a locality in central Victoria, Australia. The locality is in the Shire of Hepburn, 108 kilometres (67 mi) north west of the state capital, Melbourne. The locality is named for the falls on Sailors Creek, a tributary of the Loddon River

At the 2016 census, Sailors Falls had a population of 62.
