= Clydesdale, Victoria =

Clydesdale Victoria
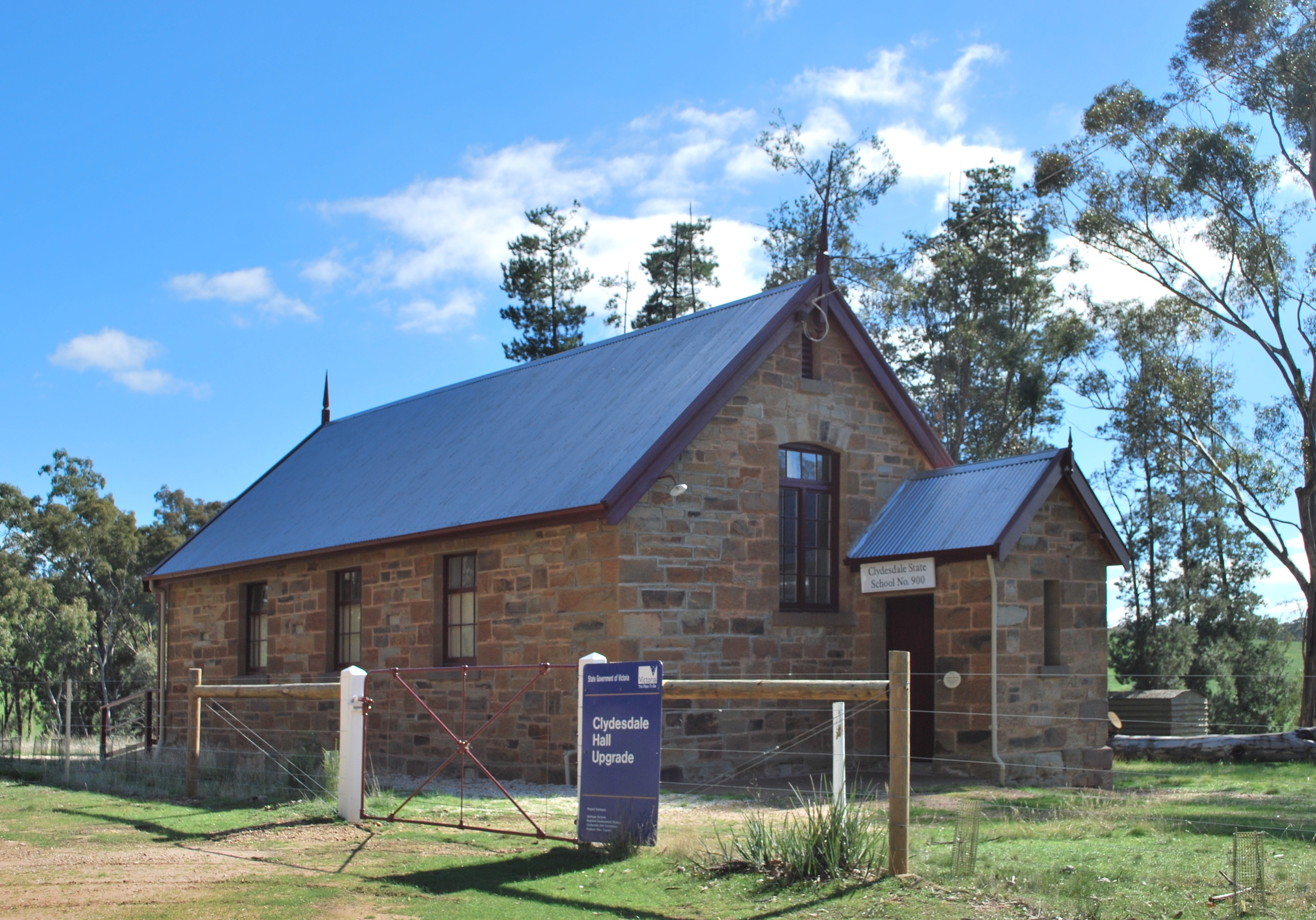
- Clydesdale Hall

- Coordinates: 37°10′S 144°05′E
- Population: 58 (2016 census)
- Postcode(s): 3461
- Location: 130 km (81 mi) NW of Melbourne; 67 km (42 mi) N of Ballarat; 61 km (38 mi) S of Bendigo; 25 km (16 mi) SW of Castlemaine; 9 km (6 mi) SW of Newstead
- LGA(s): Shire of Hepburn
- State electorate(s): Macedon
- Federal division(s): Ballarat

Clydesdale is a locality in central Victoria, Australia. The locality is in the Shire of Hepburn, 130 kilometres (81 mi) north west of the state capital, Melbourne.

At the 2016 census, Clydesdale had a population of 58.
