= Leonards Hill, Victoria =

Leonards Hill
- Town
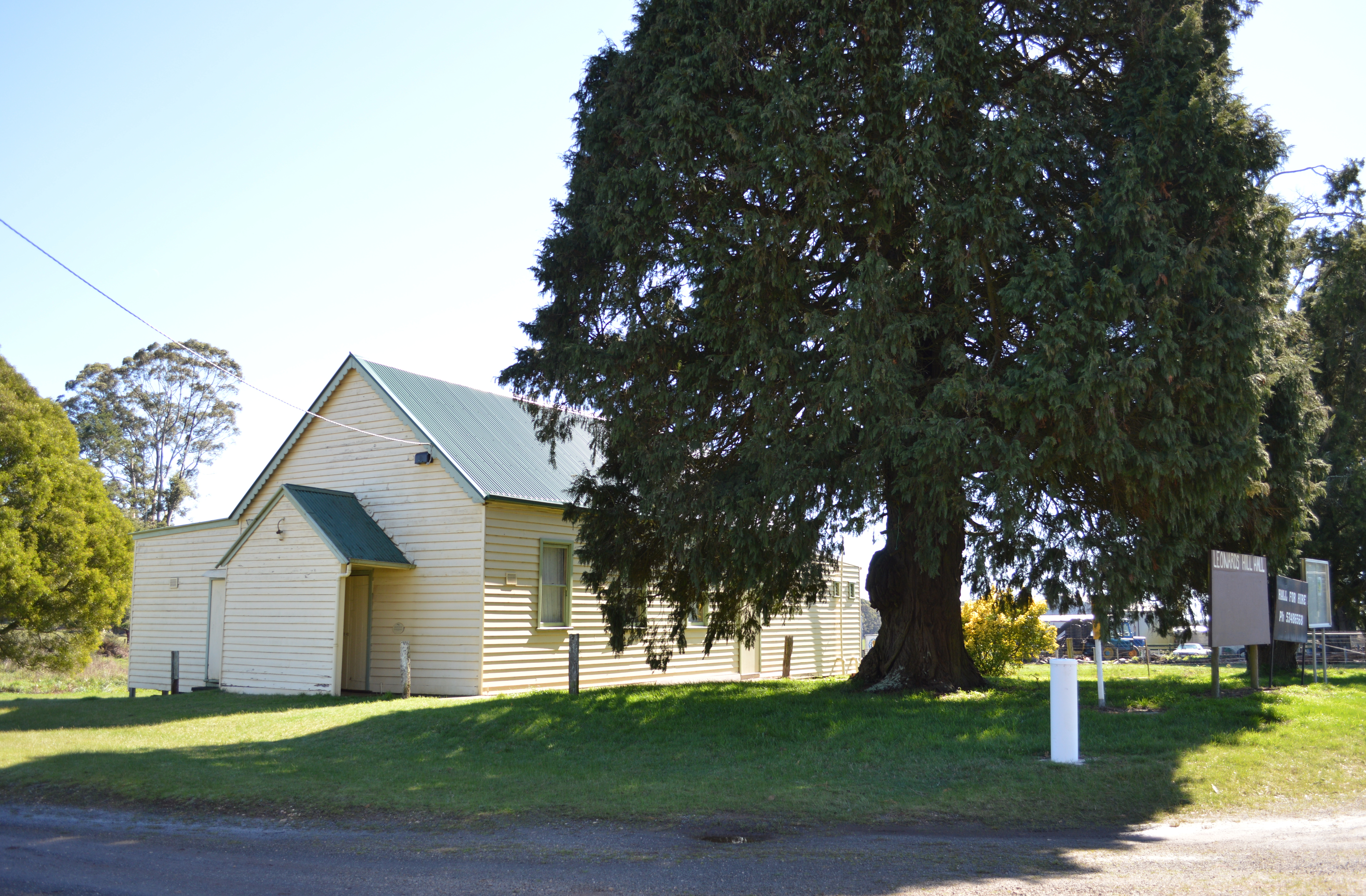
- Public hall, built in 1884

- Coordinates: 37°26′0″S 144°07′0″E
- Country: Australia
- State: Victoria
- LGA: Shire of Hepburn
- Location: 104 km (65 mi) W of Melbourne; 35 km (22 mi) N of Ballarat; 10 km (6.2 mi) S of Daylesford

Government
  - State electorate: Macedon
  - Federal division: Ballarat

Population
  - Total: 45 (2016 census)
- Postcode: 3461

Leonards Hill is a village located in the Shire of Hepburn, Victoria, Australia. At the 2016 census, Leonards Hill had a population of 45.

South of Daylesford on the Ballan road, the town takes its name from timber splitter, W P Leonard who took up 143 acres (58 ha) of land on the hill in the 1860s.

The village first started as a saw milling settlement satisfying the demand for timber required in the mining industry in the then nearby goldfields of Daylesford, Smeaton, Allendale, Creswick and Ballarat. By the 1860s, there were four sawmills operating in the area. At its height, the then much larger village, had a school, blacksmiths shop, bakery, hotel, butchers shop, several churches, 3 general stores and a post office, now all closed with little evidence remaining of their locations.

Leonards Hill was, until 1915, a part of the Shire of Mt Franklin which then merged with the nearby Shire of Glenlyon in that year. The Shire of Glenlyon itself was to merge with the Borough of Daylesford in 1966 to become the Shire of Daylesford and Glenlyon (which itself was forced to merge with several surrounding Shires into the Shire of Hepburn in 1995).

Leonards Hill Post Office opened on 1 January 1868 and closed in 1971.

The Leonards Hill railway station was a stage of the Daylesford to North Creswick line until services were withdrawn in July 1953. The rails remained in place until 1959 but no further scheduled trains ran on them.

The town was chosen as the location for the Hepburn Wind Project.
