= Guildford, Victoria =

Guildford
- Town
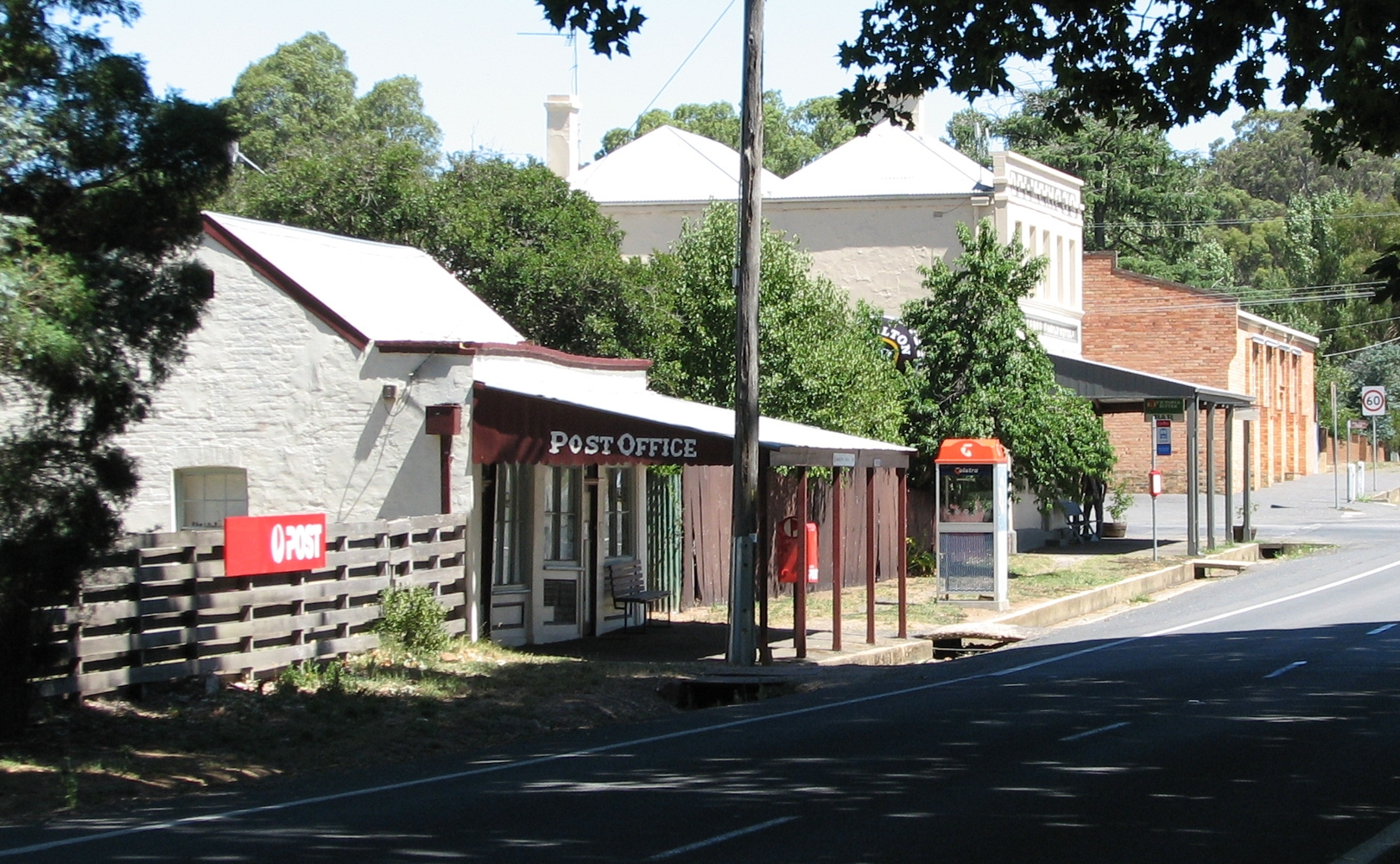

- Interactive map of Guildford
- Coordinates: 37°09′00″S 144°09′55″E
- Country: Australia
- State: Victoria
- LGA: Shire of Mount Alexander
- Location: 124 km (77 mi) NW of Melbourne; 11 km (6.8 mi) SE of Castlemaine; 50 km (31 mi) SE of Bendigo

Population
  - Total: 333 (2016 census)
- Postcode: 3451
Localities around Guildford
Strangways	Yapeen	Vaughan
Yandoit	Guildford	Tarilta
Franklinford	Mount Franklin and Porcupine Ridge	Glenlyon

Guildford is a town in Mount Alexander Shire, Victoria, Australia, situated on the Loddon River. It is located on the Midland Highway between Daylesford and Castlemaine and it is 124 kilometres (77 mi) north-west of Melbourne. The population recorded at the 2016 census was 333.

Facilities in the town include a post office (in a building dating from 1901), hotel, community hall, a cricket ground and a general store.

It is thought that the town was named after Guildford in England.

== Big Tree ==
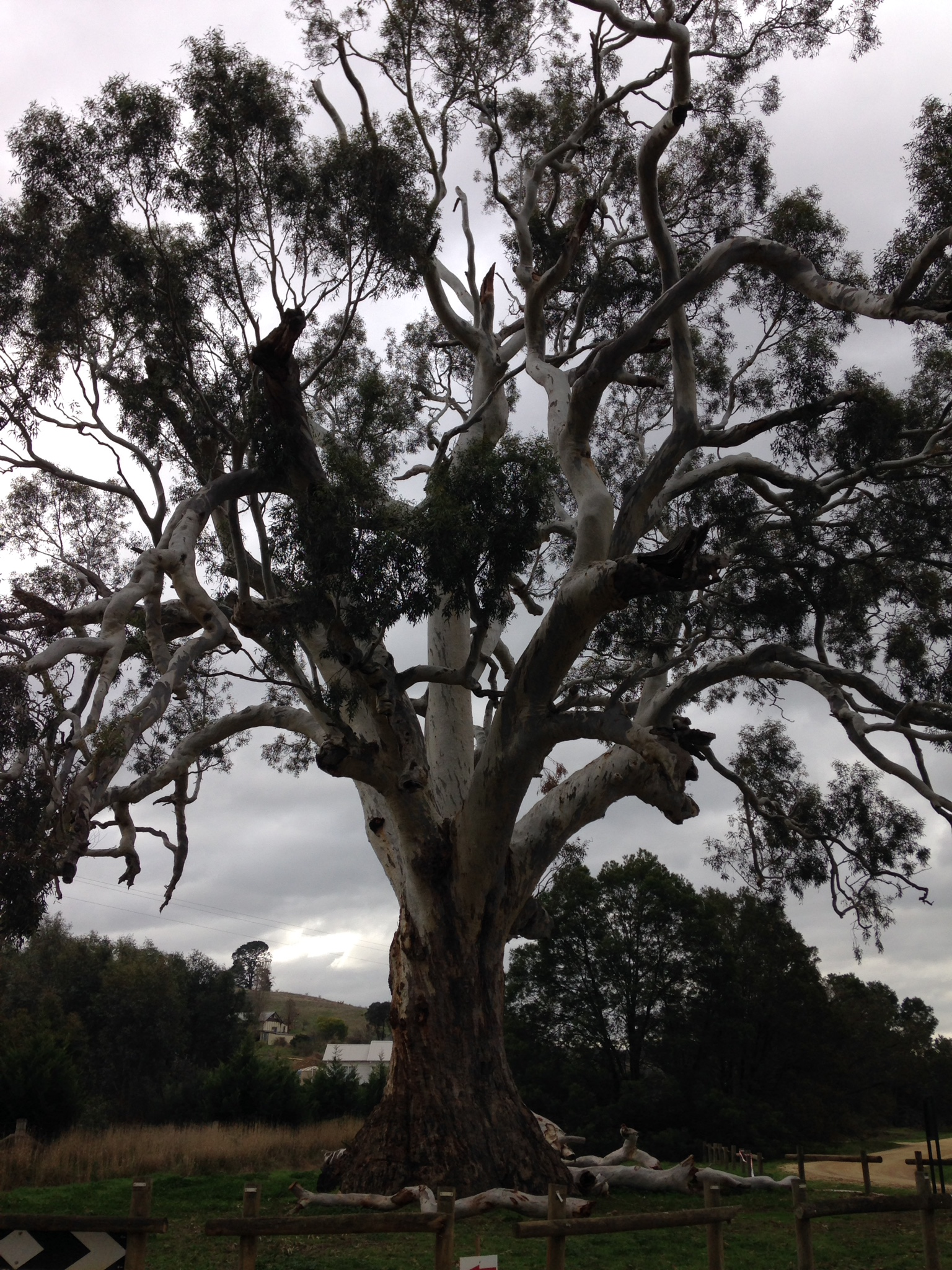
The Big Tree, river red gum (Eucalyptus camaldulensis (fam. Myrtaceae)) on outskirts of Guildford, Victoria Australia

The Big Tree is a large, well-preserved river red gum (Eucalyptus camaldulensis), located at the corner of Fryers Street and Ballarat Street. It is thought to be one of the largest in Victoria, with a height of 34 metres and circumference of 9.35 metres at the base. The tree is estimated to be over 500 years old.

== History ==
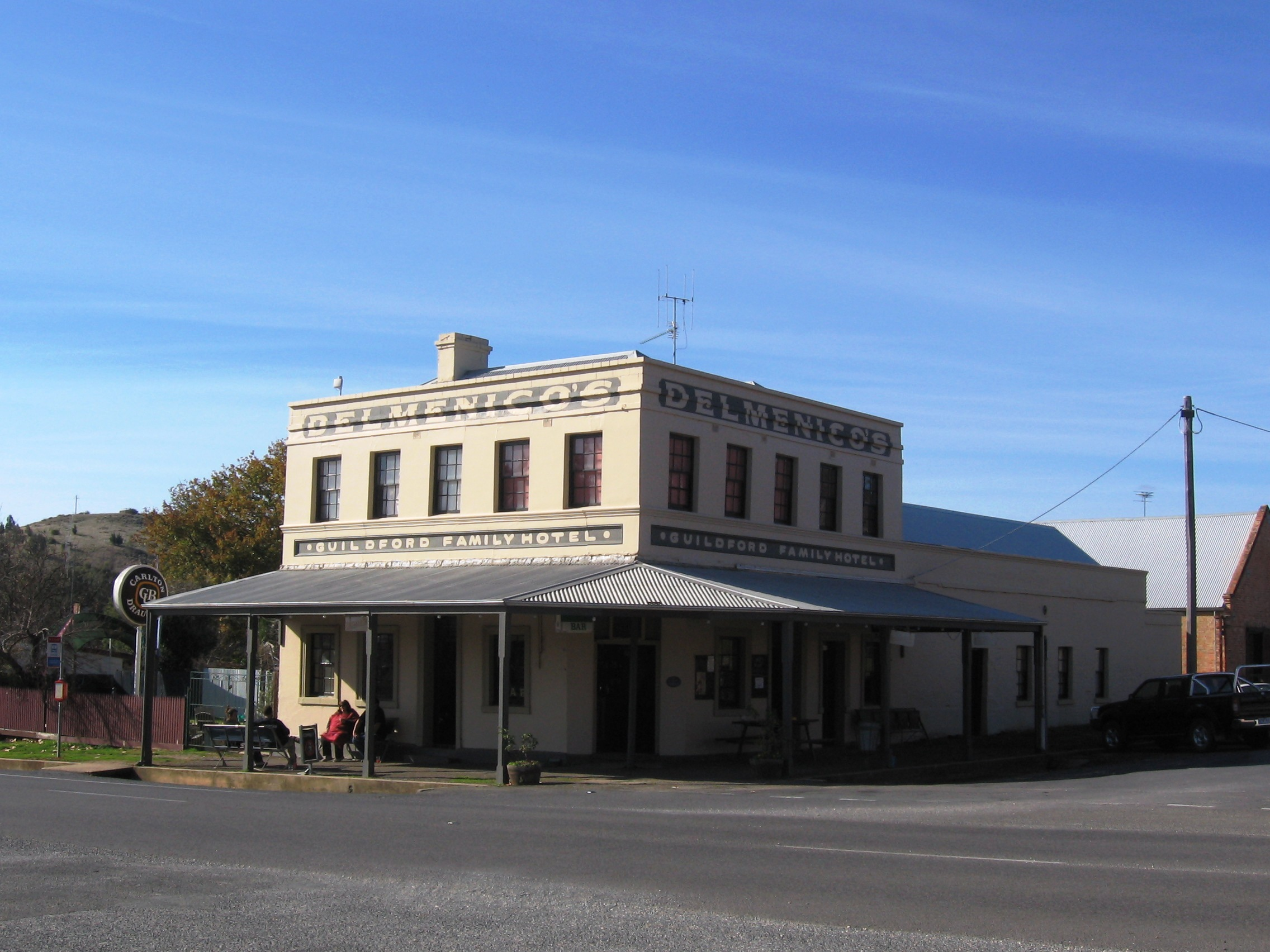
The Guildford Family Hotel dates back to the 1850s

The area was known as Yarrayne to the original inhabitants of the area, the Djadjawurrung people. The first European to explore the area was Major Thomas Mitchell in 1836.

By the 1840s pastoral runs had been established and, in the following decade, gold miners flocked to the area during the rush at the Mount Alexander goldfields. The largest encampment of Chinese miners in Victoria (estimates vary from 5000 to 6000 individual miners) was situated at the junction of the Loddon River and Campbells Creek. Tensions ran high between the white miners and the Chinese which erupted in numerous local conflicts. This anti-Chinese hostility, combined with discriminatory taxation against Chinese miners, saw the Chinese population dwindle and eventually all but disappear by the end of the gold rush.

The first hotel opened in 1854 but was destroyed by fire three years later. The Guildford Family Hotel which also dates back to this era is still operational today. Other hotels in the town included the Farmers Arms Hotel (delicenced) and the Commercial Hotel (1865), the building now serving as a general store.

A school was built and a Post Office opened in 1860, followed by the Anglican Church the following year. The Catholic Church and the Wesleyan Chapel are now both private property.

In 1919 an avenue of honour was planted along the main road, using London planes, to commemorate locals who fought in World War I.

== Sport ==
The Guildford Football Club appears to have been formed in 1888 and they first played in the Castlemaine District Football Association in 1889 as Guildford/Newstead FC. Guildford FC played in the Castlemaine District Football Association in the following seasons: 1894–1896, 1898–1900, 1906–1911, 1920, 1924 and 1926–1934. The club won premierships in 1924 and 1928.

== Banjo Jamboree ==
The Guildford Banjo Jamboree is an annual three day music festival held in September. The festival has an emphasis on string band music but also includes other styles. The Jamboree includes workshops and concerts in venues around town and on the football oval.

== Panorama ==
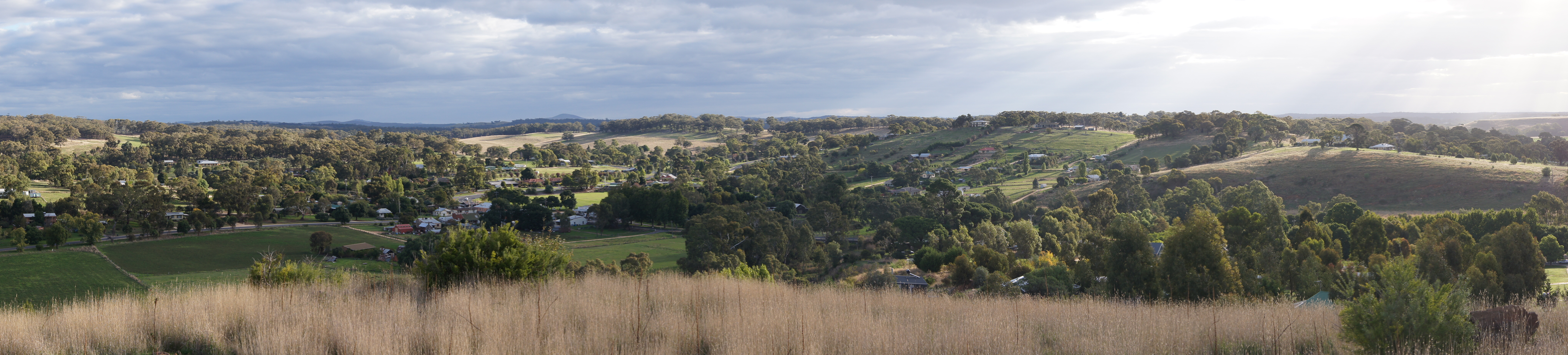
Guildford panorama
