= Wattle Flat, Victoria =

Wattle Flat Victoria
- Coordinates: 37°28′49″S 143°56′55″E
- Population: 97
- Postcode(s): 3352
- LGA(s): City of Ballarat; Shire of Hepburn
- State electorate(s): Ripon
- Federal division(s): Ballarat

Wattle Flat is a locality in central Victoria, Australia, in the City of Ballarat and Hepburn Shire local government areas. At the 2016 census, it had a population of 97.
