= Drummond, Victoria =

Drummond Victoria
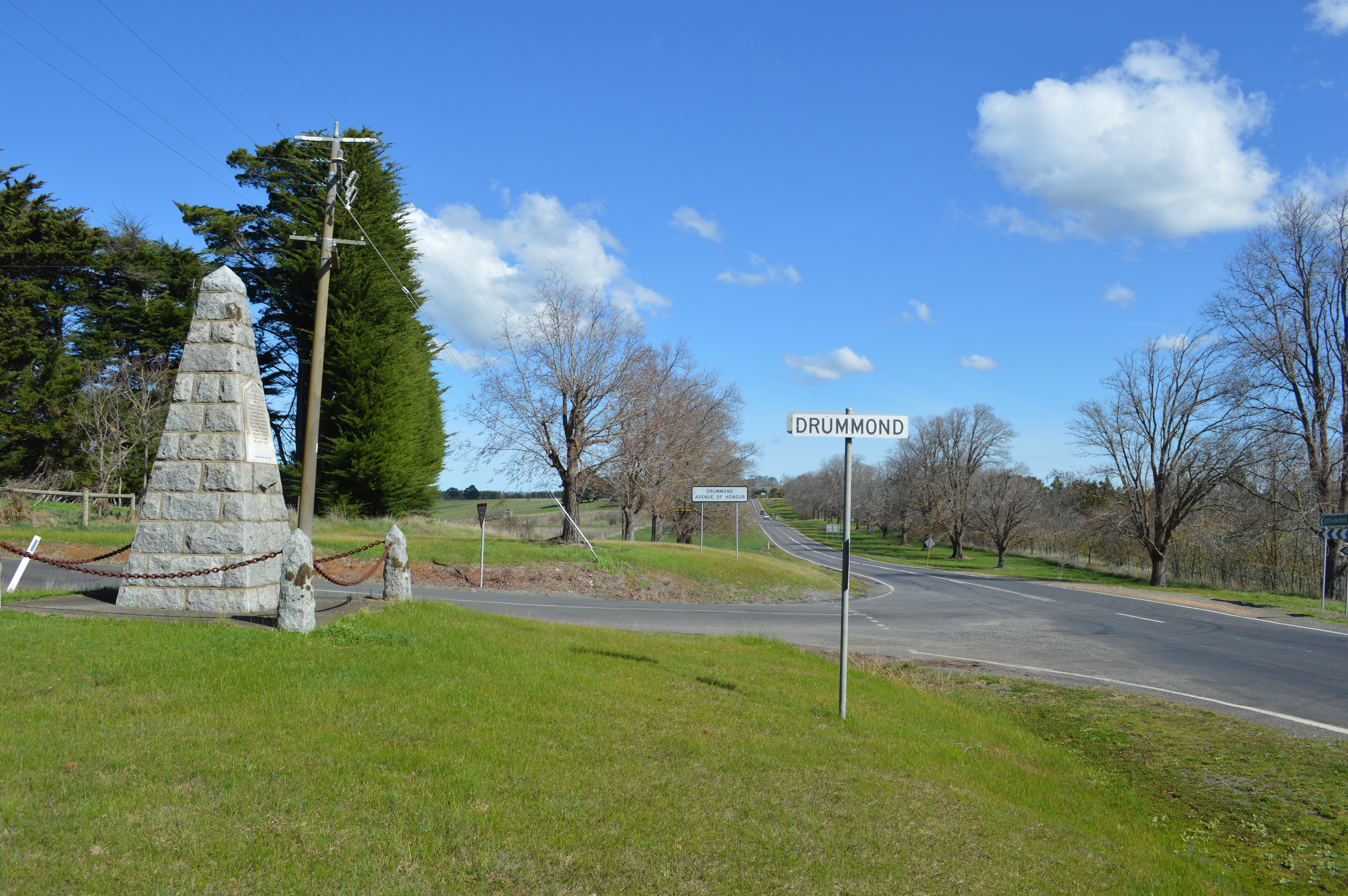
- Looking towards the Avenue of Honour at Drummond, with the war memorial visible on the left

- Coordinates: 37°14′8″S 144°19′46″E
- Population: 283 (2016 census)
- Postcode(s): 3461
- Location: 106 km (66 mi) NW of Melbourne; 23 km (14 mi) NE of Daylesford; 17 km (11 mi) W of Kyneton
- LGA(s): Shire of Hepburn
- State electorate(s): Macedon
- Federal division(s): Ballarat; Bendigo

Drummond is a locality in central Victoria, Australia. The locality is in the Shire of Hepburn, 106 kilometres (66 mi) north west of the state capital, Melbourne situated between Glenlyon to the south and Malmsbury to the north.

At the 2016 census, Drummond had a population of 283.

Drummond is home of the small rural Drummond Primary school and Drummond Public Hall.
