= Eganstown =

- Town
- Coordinates: 37°22′0″S 144°05′0″E
- Country: Australia
- State: Victoria
- LGA: Shire of Hepburn
- Elevation: 572 m (1,877 ft)

Population
  - Total: 203 (2016 census)
- Postcode: 3461

Eganstown is a town in the Shire of Hepburn, Victoria, Australia. At the 2016 census, Eganstown and the surrounding area had a population of 203.

West of Daylesford, Victoria on the Midland Highway. Until 1872, called Blanket Flat, the town takes its name from John Egan who secured a lease of land here in 1848. The land had originally been taken up by J.W. Berry in 1840. The area contains the Deep Creek Mineral Spring and Corinella Spring.

Deep Creek Post Office opened on 21 January 1861, was renamed Egan's Town in 1872 and Eganstown around 1917, closing in 1969.

== Corinella Run ==
The Corinella Run was on Deep Creek and John Egan ran sheep there. Egan took the name Corinella from the Aboriginal place name Koorinella, which means a place where kangaroos drink.
