= Denver, Victoria =

Denver Victoria
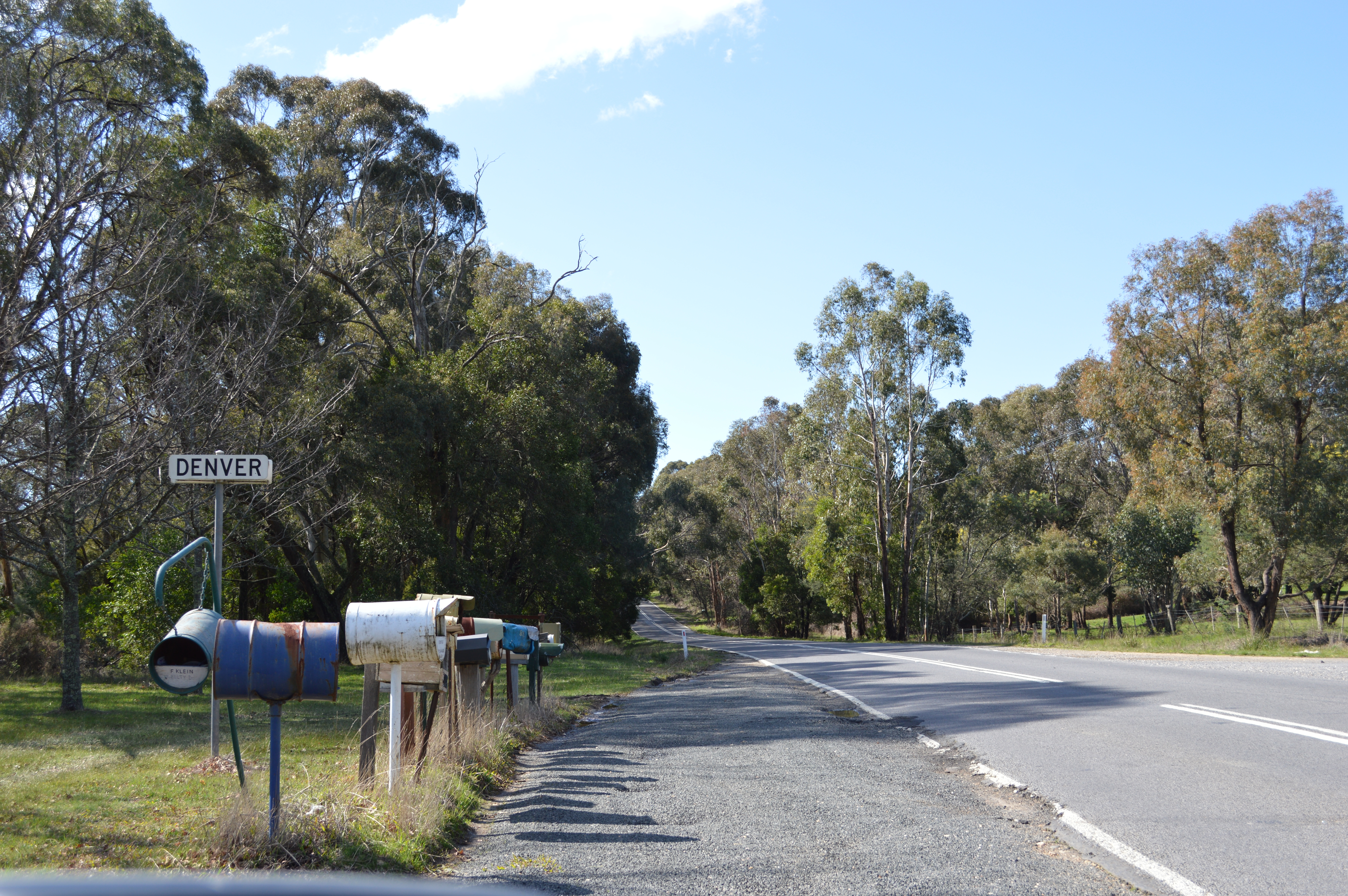
- Letter boxes in a row at Denver

- Coordinates: 37°16′33″S 144°17′54″E
- Population: 150 (2016 census)
- Postcode(s): 3461
- Location: 96 km (60 mi) NW of Melbourne; 20 km (12 mi) SW of Kyneton; 4 km (2 mi) E of Glenlyon
- LGA(s): Shire of Hepburn
- State electorate(s): Macedon
- Federal division(s): Ballarat

Denver is a locality in central Victoria, Australia. The locality is in the Shire of Hepburn, 106 kilometres (66 mi) north west of the state capital, Melbourne.

At the 2016 census, Denver had a population of 150.
