= Blampied, Victoria =

Blampied Victoria
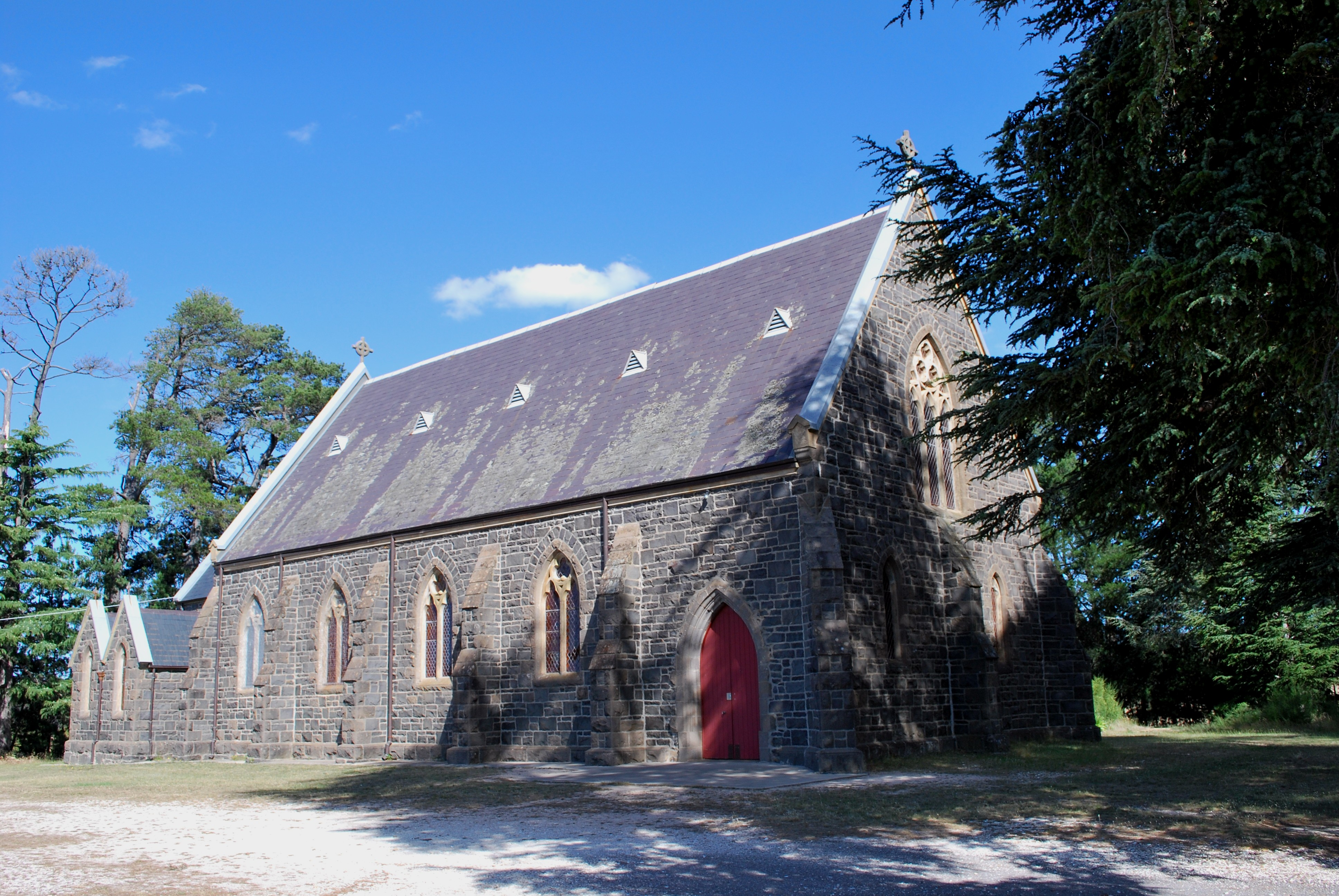
- St Joseph's Roman Catholic church

- Coordinates: 37°22′0″S 144°03′0″E
- Population: 212 (2016 census)
- Postcode(s): 3364
- Location: 117 km (73 mi) NW of Melbourne; 33 km (21 mi) NE of Ballarat; 9 km (6 mi) W of Daylesford
- LGA(s): Shire of Hepburn
- State electorate(s): Ripon
- Federal division(s): Ballarat

Blampied is a town in the central highlands of Victoria on the Midland Highway. The town is in the Shire of Hepburn, 117 kilometres (73 mi) north west of the state capital of Melbourne. At the 2016 census, Blampied and the surrounding area had a population of 212.

== History ==
The town was named after Louis Blampied who built a hotel here which is now called the Swiss Mountain Inn.

Blampied Post Office opened on 20 November 1879 and closed in 1971.
