= Dean, Victoria =

Dean
- Town
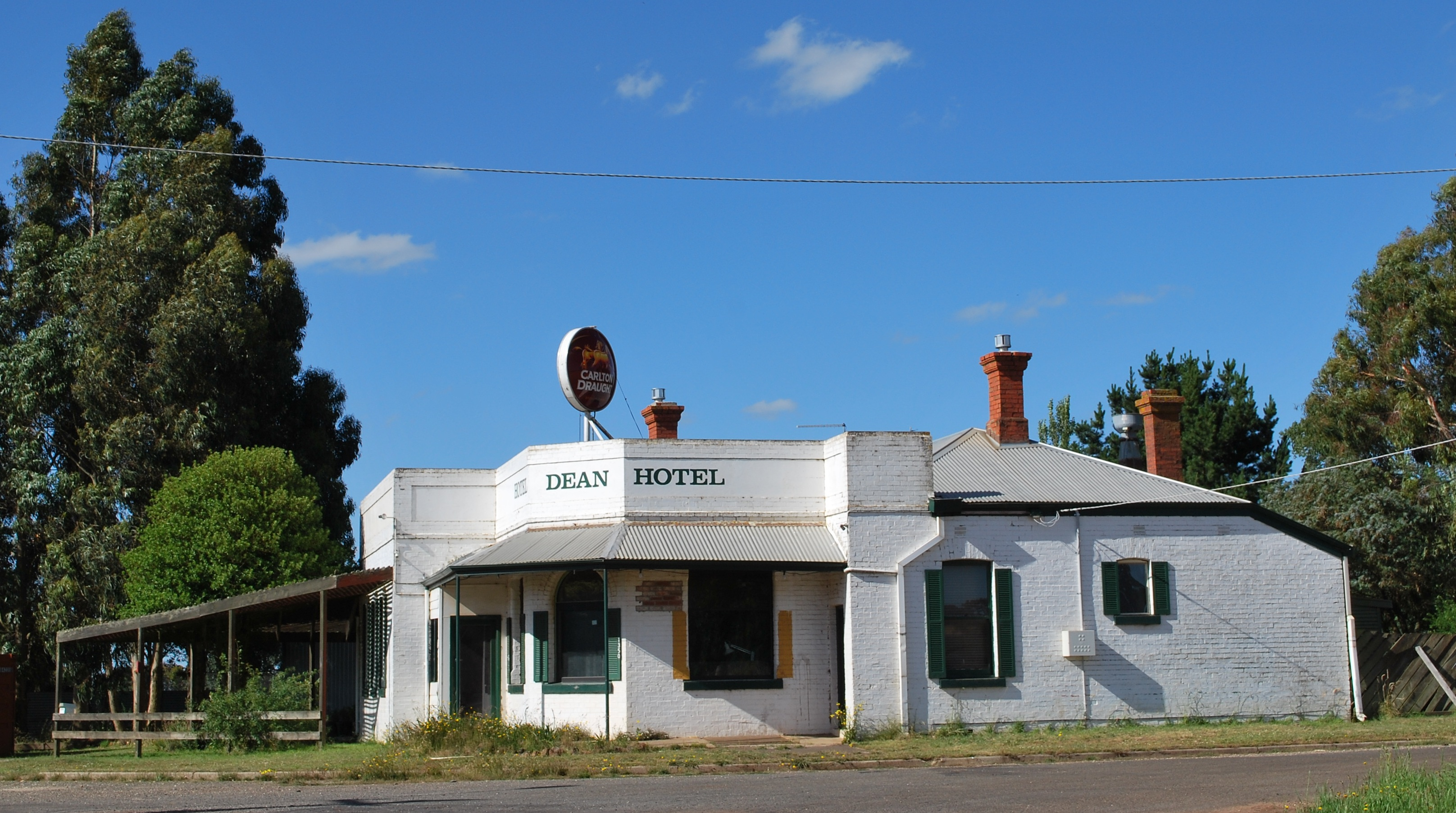
- The Dean Hotel, now closed

- Coordinates: 37°28′0″S 143°59′0″E
- Country: Australia
- State: Victoria
- LGA: Shire of Hepburn
- Location: 120 km (75 mi) W of Melbourne; 19 km (12 mi) NE of Ballarat; 10 km (6.2 mi) SE of Creswick, Victoria

Government
  - State electorate: Ripon
  - Federal division: Ballarat

Population
  - Total: 120 (2016 census)
- Postcode: 3363

Dean is a town in Victoria, Australia. It is located in the Shire of Hepburn 120 kilometres (75 mi) west of the state capital, Melbourne and 16 kilometres (9.9 mi) north-east of Ballarat, close to the Ballarat-Daylesford Road. The Dean Post Office opened on 2 September 1861 and closed in 1980.

At the 2016 census, Dean had a population of 120.
