= Kingston, Victoria =

Kingston
- Town
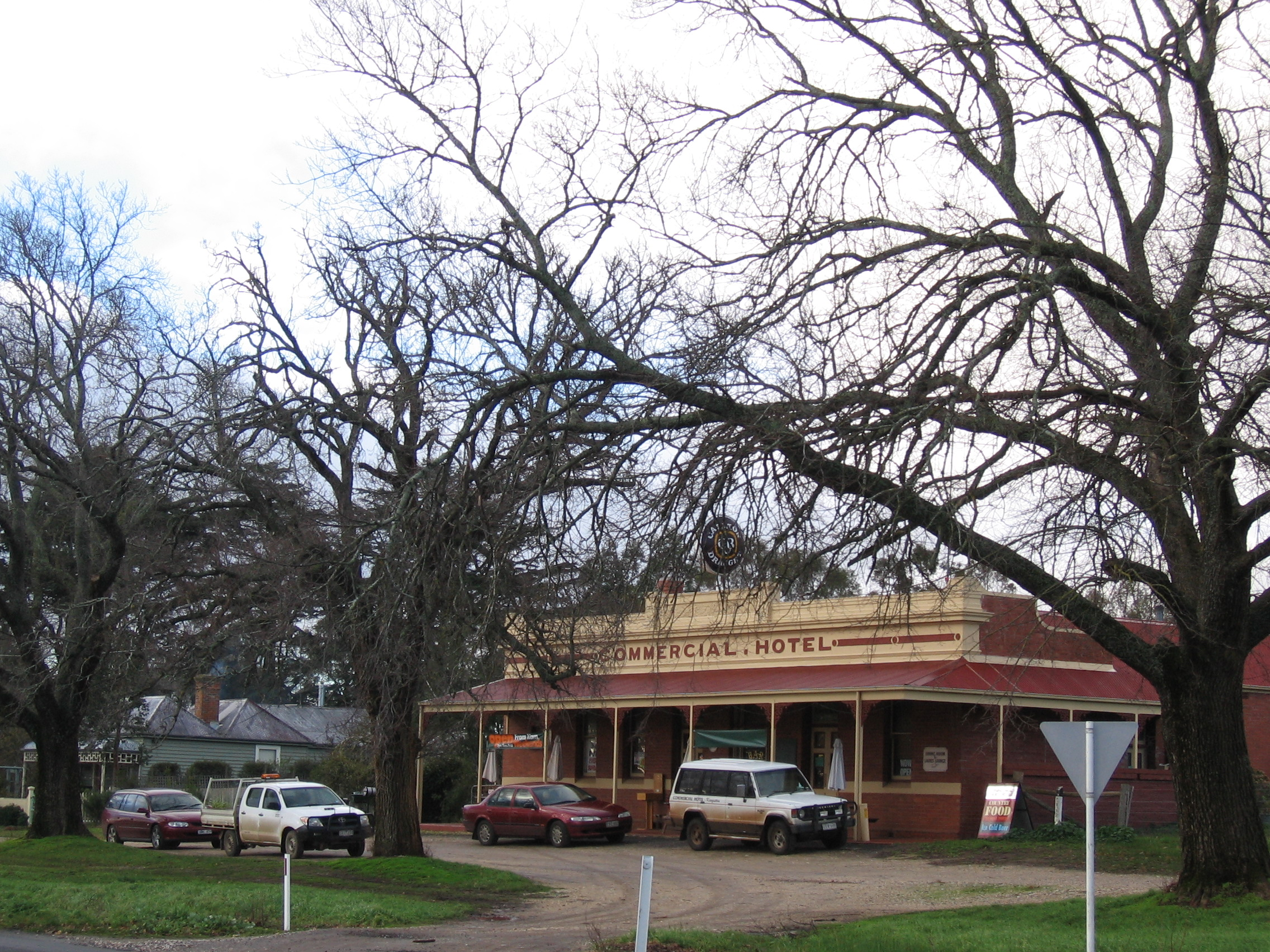
- The Restored Commercial Hotel at Kingston the last of the hotels still currently trading.

- Coordinates: 37°22′0″S 143°57′0″E
- Country: Australia
- State: Victoria
- LGA: Shire of Hepburn
- Location: 130 km (81 mi) WNW of Melbourne; 27 km (17 mi) NE of Ballarat; 23 km (14 mi) W of Daylesford; 9 km (5.6 mi) NE of Creswick

Government
  - State electorate: Ripon
  - Federal division: Ballarat

Population
  - Total: 190 (2021 census)
- Postcode: 3364

Kingston is a town in the Shire of Hepburn, Victoria, Australia. At the 2021 census, Kingston had a population of 190.

== Geology ==
The geology of the Kingston area comprises an uplifted and fractured Palaeozoic bedrock landscape carved by natural forces. The resultant ancient valleys were in-filled with sediments during the Tertiary Age. These are overlain or interrupted by layers of basalt flows from volcanoes during the Neogene period.

Shale and sandstone layers were formed around 435 to 500 million years ago. During a period about 345 to 395 million years ago, there was a major mountain-forming event that created gold-bearing quartz veins known as reefs.

Erosion during the Oligocene–Pliocene period, which occurred about 26 to 2 million years ago, led to the formation of gold deposits in the ancient valleys of the upper Loddon River.

Around 2 million years ago to less than 30,000 years ago, there was a period of volcanic activity that filled these valleys and covered the gold deposits with layers of gravel, sand, silt, clay, and some lignite. These deposits were mined extensively for gold during the mid to late 1800s in the Creswick area. Miners followed these deposits under the basalt layers, which they called 'deep leads.'

Within and around the area, at least 15 volcanic eruption points formed small cones. The eruptions produced deposits of scoria, ash, and tuff near these cones. In between eruptions, clay layers formed between the basalt flows. Mount Kooroocheang, known locally as Mount Smeaton, just north of Kingston, is the largest volcano in the Uplands, rising 200 m above the plain to an elevation of 676 m. Young cones near Ballarat, Mount Warrenheip and Mount Buninyong, are visible from Spring Hill.

The basalt layer, which is up to 100 metres thick over the ancient valleys, acts as a significant underground water source in the Kingston area. The fertile soil covering the basalts, particularly around the volcanic cones such as Kingston's Spring Hill, is excellent for agriculture, and potatoes are the dominant crop in those areas.

Goulburn-Murray Water administers the Loddon Highlands WSPA Groundwater Management Plan under section 32A(5) of the Water Act 1989 of the Victorian Government.

== Climate ==
The Australian Bureau of Meteorology provides climate data for Creswick, 10 km SW of Kingston.

Creswick Statistics	Jan	Feb	Mar	Apr	May	Jun	Jul	Aug	Sep	Oct	Nov	Dec	Annual
Temperature
Mean maximum temperature (°C)	26.9	26.3	23.5	18.2	13.6	11.3	10.3	11.2	14.1	17.2	19.6	23.2	17.9
Mean minimum temperature (°C)	11.0	11.9	9.8	7.0	5.2	2.9	2.4	2.7	4.2	6.0	7.0	9.0	6.6
Rainfall
Mean rainfall (mm)	47.5	43.9	38.5	54.6	75.1	70.4	77.9	88.8	74.3	77.8	60.4	46.0	753.3
Decile 5 (median) rainfall (mm)	30.6	28.8	34.3	49.0	73.2	67.2	77.8	83.5	70.2	77.1	57.3	42.0	744.3
Mean number of days of rain ≥ 1 mm	4.5	4.1	5.2	7.6	11.1	11.6	13.7	14.6	11.4	10.7	8.4	6.6	109.5

== History ==
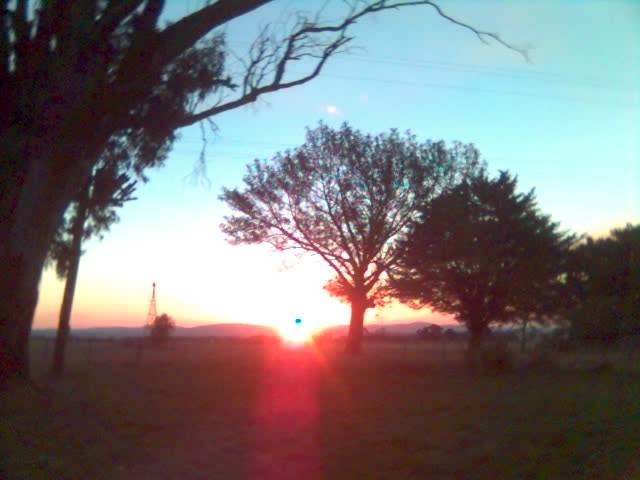
Sunset in Kingston.

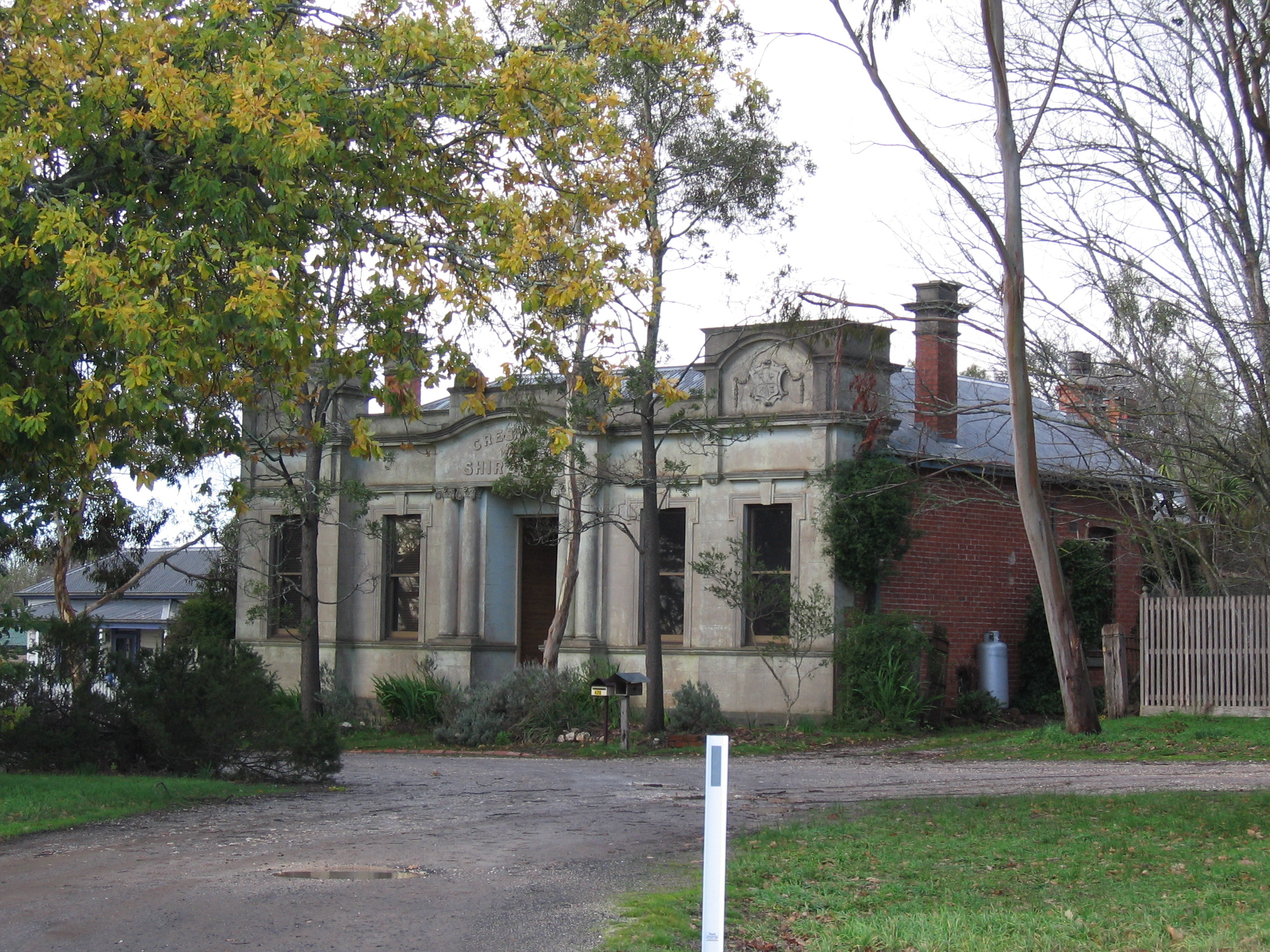
Former Creswick Shire Hall (now a private residence)

=== First inhabitants ===
The Dja Dja Wurrung People are the Traditional Owners of the district of Kingston. Their country extended over lands from close to Bendigo to Avoca, from the Great Dividing Range to near Pyramid Hill and they were displaced by white settlement, with some retreating to Parker's Protectorate at Franklinford.

=== European settlement ===
Kingston Post Office opened on 11 October 1858. A polling place for the Creswick electoral district was first opened in the town in October 1860. It became the administrative centre of the Creswick Shire until the merging of the Shire and Borough of Creswick on 29 May 1934.

=== Gold ===
Kingston was once a thriving gold mining town during the Victorian Gold Rush.

An 1876 report in The Argus details the gold rush at Kingston when valuable gold deposits were discovered beneath the basalt in the area, at a reachable depth. It records how by the mid-1870s, many working in the Kingston mines had even transported their entire houses to new locations; McLellan, a Scot, ingeniously moved houses using a large triangular frame with three low wheels. They lifted the house onto this frame with screw-jacks, and reinforced it to prevent damage during haulage by a team of eight to ten horses traveling at about 13 km per day. The house would be made habitable again at its new destination.

Those who didn't move their houses flocked to Creswick on Saturday evenings to catch a train to Ballarat and returned early on Monday morning. Long-time resident miners generally owned their houses, and with plenty of job opportunities and improved living conditions compared to the earlier rough times; carpenters and masons were earning 10 shillings per day, as demand for their services increased. Bricklayers were paid 11s. per day, mostly occupied with constructing the state school, which would soon be completed. The council was taking steps to enhance the water supply in the borough, drawn from Bullarook Forest, and planning to build a new town-hall with funds borrowed from £5,000 bringing sustained employment opportunities for these laborers for some time to come.

Between Creswick and Kingston, in Broomfield Gully, alluvial mining was being conducted from the 1860s, before a company called the Nelson sunk a shaft to a depth of 27.5m until the mine flooded in 1875. Slaty Creek's Working Miners' Quartz-mining Company mine on the other hand, was abandoned when the operation did not yield profits, but with discoveries in Kingston, the mine was revived, and a 10-head stamping battery was installed by Charles Mathews, formerly associated with the Cornish Company in Daylesford.

Kingston is at the foot of the round-topped Spring Hill which rises 518m above sea level, and was cleared of dense bush to its summit for cultivation before it became the site of intensive gold-mining. The basalt plains extending northwards from Spring Hill towards Smeaton Plains and Charlotte Plains, between Maryborough and Carisbrook, had been taken up by squatters and farmers. Carter, Brawn, and Graham discovered gold deposits beneath in around 1874. Two of them had previously farmed land they purchased with proceeds of their mining in Daylesford, while Graham, known for the tragic story of his children lost in the bush, was also involved. Due to rust affecting his wheat crops, Carter found himself unable to sustain his farming after the harvest of 1873. As a result, he returned to mining. Testing the ground beneath the basalt on his farm, he sunk a shaft in Broomfield Gully, going through more than 33 metres of rock to reach the gold-bearing layer at 46 metres. The discovery yielded an extraordinarily rich find of 300 ounces of gold from just one horse-operated mining machine, seemingly originating from the Armagh Reef between the claim and Spring Hill. Subsequently, that claim was depleted, as it appeared that the gold lead extended into what is now was then called the western gutter, leading to its discovery.

The individual credited as the father of Kingston is William Bell, a farmer from Bullarook, close to Hexham. He had been exploring the region for years, alternating between farming and mining, and convinced that gold lay beneath the basalt on the Spring Hill Plains. Carter's discovery triggered significant speculation. Bell purchased an 80-acre paddock where he had found gold around 11 years earlier, paying £150 for it. He promptly sold the lease for mining purposes for £500 and a royalty. This paddock is where the Baron Rothschild mine was established, with a shaft passing through 52m of rock into auriferous reef to 60m in May 1874. Managed by Robert Veitch, previously of Daylesford, the mine employed over 80 workers and had yielded 7,886 ounces of high-quality gold by 5 November 1875. The fortunate Bell reportedly received £3,000 in dividends and half-royalties from this mine, with Russell, also of Kingston, receiving the other half. Bell believed he would gain at least £4,000 more before the claim was exhausted. In Carter's claim, closer to Spring Hill, gold was found at 150 feet, having passed through 110 feet of rock.

Most of the mines in this area were owned by local farmers and residents of Kingston or Creswick, who kept the yields of their claims confidential; however the Argus reporter, investigating actual sales of gold to the banks in Creswick from leading claims, found that;

Richardson's Western commenced to get gold on the 2nd January 1875, and up to the 6th of November had obtained 7,961oz., employing 80 men. I see that in the week ending November 1 [1875] it gave 193oz, and in the following week 381½oz. In the same weeks the Baron yielded 298¾oz. and 381½oz. respectively. Robinson's Free-hold began to raise gold in August, 1874, and up to the 6th of November last had raised 7,096oz, its weekly yield averaging about 120oz. This company has paid dividends to the amount of £2 12s. upon 6,000 shares, while Richardson's Western has paid £3 4s. per share on the same number of shares. In the month (November) previous to that in which I visited the district the 10 mines which are in gold were distributing in dividends from £1,500 to £2,000 per week. As much as 1,100oz. has been obtained in a week from Richardson's Western, and 1,000oz. from the Baron Rothschild. Nuggets have been found in these claims varying in size from a few ounces up to 120oz.-one which turned the scale at that figure having been obtained only a few weeks ago in the last-mentioned mine. Among the mines obtaining gold and not already referred to are Bunyan's Freehold, which in the first week in November gave 121oz., and in that which followed 192oz; First Chance, 31½oz.; Kingston-park 26½oz.; Lewers's Western, 21½oz; Southern 13oz.; Dan Ryan's, and Kingston-park. Lewers's Freehold, on Lewers's Lead, has been worked out, gold to the value of £36,000 having been taken out of it. A company known as the De Murska - and therefore of very late formation - are sinking at a considerable distance north from Spring, hill, and expect to find in their ground not one, but the junction of several leads. The Ristori and the O'Loghlen comprise three blocks of large extent, a portion of the Seven-hills estate, bought by Mr. Rossell, of Kingston, Mr. Parkins, and some Ballarat men, from Mr. Alexander Wilson, of the Wimmera, and both expect to leach gold before long. So much confidence is felt in the district in the value of the known leads that a few weeks ago £1,000 was given for 114 acres of a freehold known as Dyke's, With a royalty of 7½%, and an under taking that work would be begun in December last. The leads, so far as known, are three in number, all apparently having their rise in Spring-hill, and growing deeper as they travel towards the plains.

Kingston once had a large coach and vehicle building manufacturer, Barker Brothers, up to 10 ten hotels, a flour mill and numerous chaff mills. After the miners left so did the industry and in 1976 the railway station and the Creswick–Daylesford train line closed.

== Population ==
Though small, the population of Kingston grew by nearly 7% in the 5 years since the 2016 census when it had 177 people; at the 2021 census, Kingston had a population of 190, or 1.14% of the 16,609 population total for the shire, and older than most in the region; the median age being 56.

== Economy ==
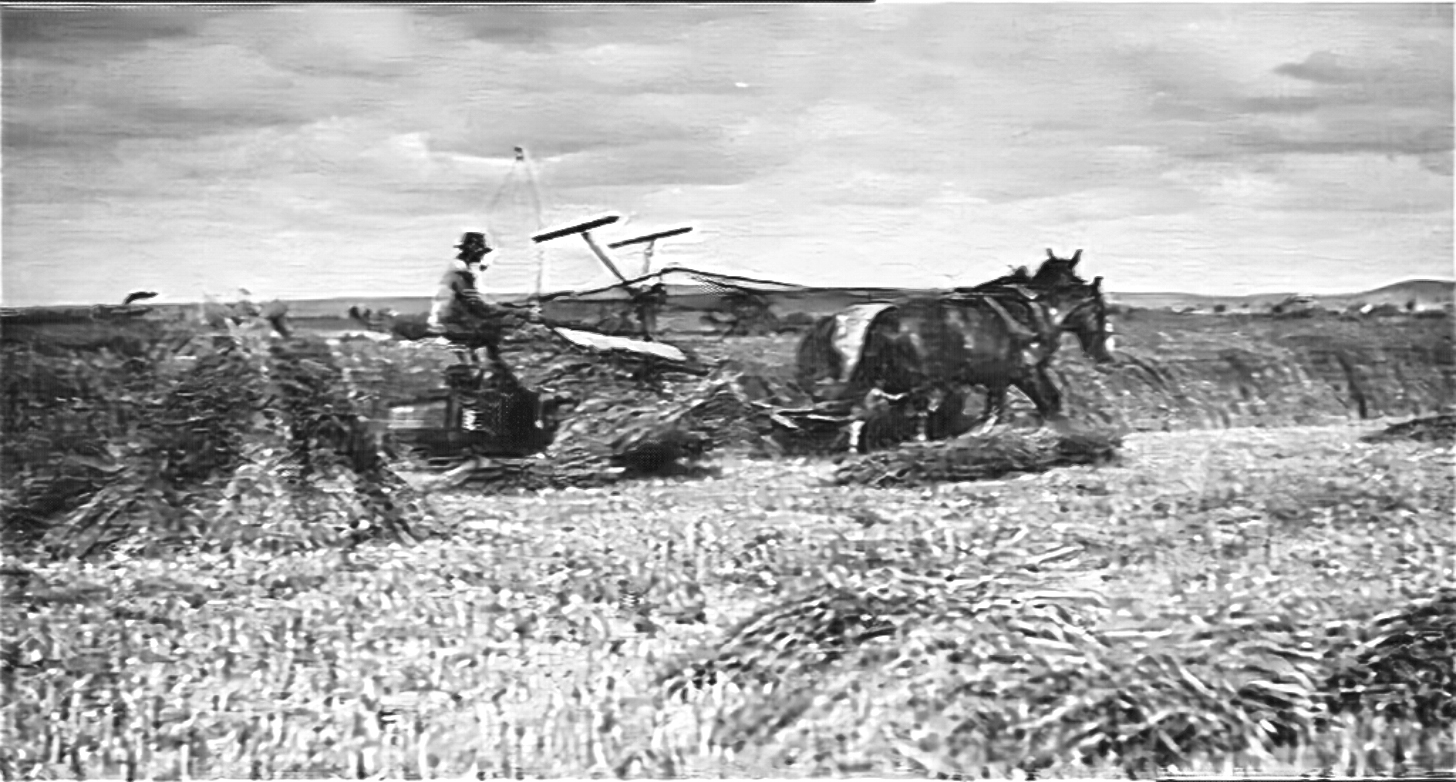
Morrish Bros in 1922 harvest wheat in Kingston

The area's rich red volcanic soil and good rainfall support agricultural industries including potatoes (typically grown for food processor McCains), sheep and wheat. An illustrated article in the Australasian in 1904 noted that;

The districts of Newlyn, Dean, Kingston, and Smeaton are among the most noted farming districts in Victoria. The soil is volcanic, and of great richness. The country is charmingly picturesque. Hay and potatoes are the chief crops cultivated, and the fattening of sheep and cattle is largely carried on. Red clover is a pasture crop widely grown, and it thrives wonderfully well throughout these districts. [Hay]stack building has been carried to great perfection. Haystacks meet the eye everywhere, and such stacks are worth travelling miles to see. They are trim, well built, and beautifully thatched. The Smeaton Agricultural Society recently offered a series of prizes for the best built stacks.

Ballarat to Daylesford railway line which opened in 1887 is now the Heritage-listed Daylesford-Creswick Railway Reserve and walking path. It ran from Daylesford, through Musk Vale, Sailors Falls, Leonards Hill, Korweinguboora, Rocklyn, Newlyn, Kingston, Allendale, Broomfield to Creswick. The Allendale to Newlyn section of the railway was closed in 1976.

In 1921, after the district agricultural show was held at Allendale, some members proposed relocating future shows to Kingston, and subsequently a plot of land was acquired near its railway station with Mr. W. H. Gore, the shire engineer, overseeing the layout. In 1922, all the structures and equipment, including the grandstand, were relocated to this new location using a Handley-Page steam engine. Intense debate during the annual meeting in 1923 resolved to change the name to the 'Kingston, Smeaton, Newlyn, and Dean Agricultural Society.'

=== Decline ===
Businesses, shops, and the primary school in 2004, closed after trade dwindled, initiating that vicious circle of decline faced by many country towns that is exacerbated by the consequent need to travel greater distances for basic services.

=== Revival ===
Holiday and business accommodation in Kingston is increasingly provided by bed and breakfast establishments as well as by the Commercial Hotel, reopened after a 12-year closure. The location of Kingston between Daylesford and Ballarat, and its undulating rural outlook, has made it attractive to retirees, and also for city folk looking to buy weekenders or holiday houses, bringing new investment and stimulating the local economy.

== Heritage ==
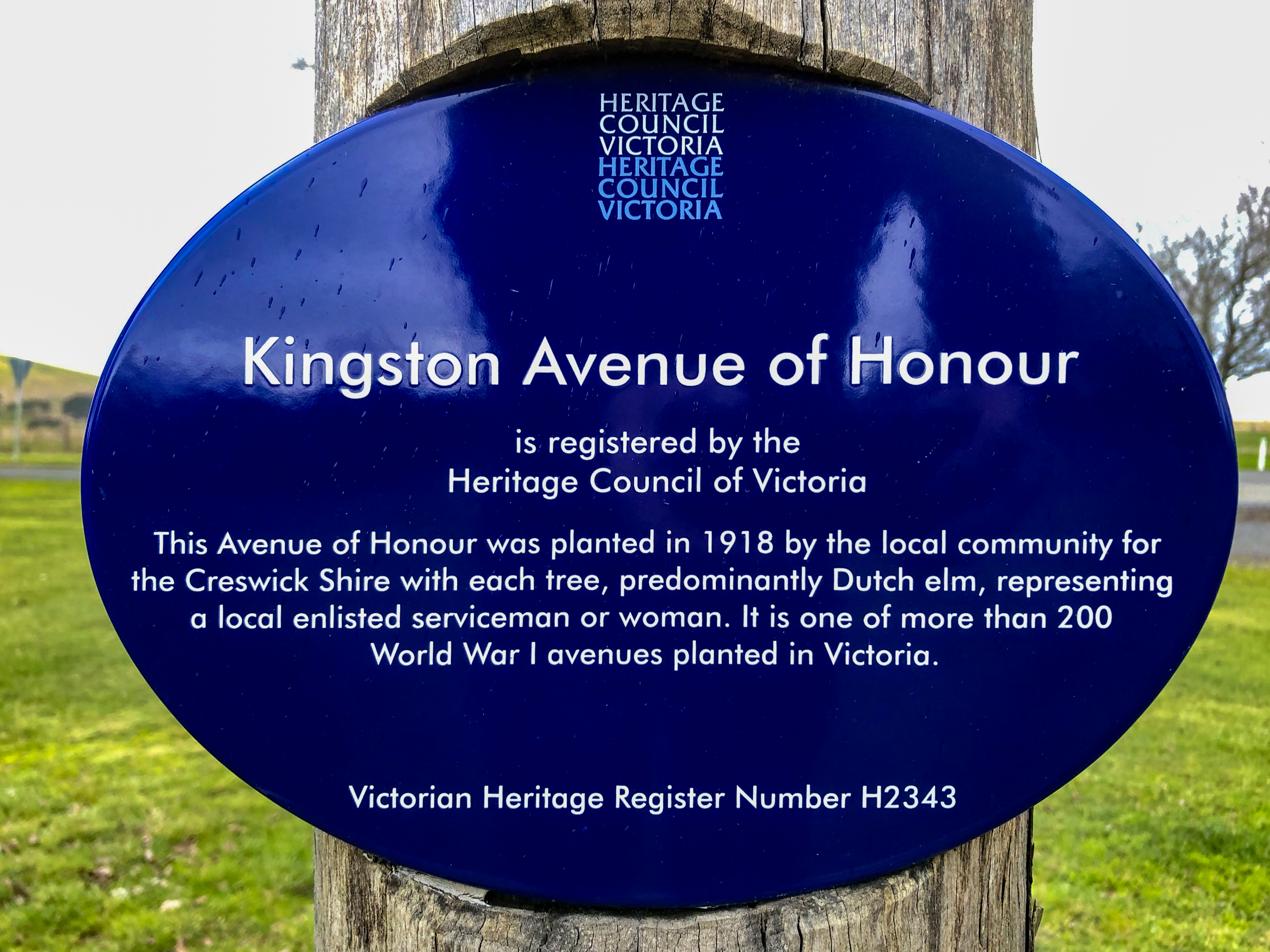
Blue Plaque marking the Kingston Avenue of Honour war memorial

=== Gold rush relics ===
Structures from the gold rush era remain. The Berry Consols Company ran one of the most prosperous mines in the Berry Lead system, ranking second only to Madam Berry in gold production. The remains at No. 1 shaft were classified by Victorian Heritage in 1988 as significant at a state level, and along with extant engineering drawings of the installation, reveal the layout of the pumping and winding machinery, which were powered by basic horizontal steam engines. This plant was among the final installations of its kind on the lead system, as later needs demanded the use of more efficient and powerful compound engines.

The Madam Berry West Gold Mining Co. Mine & Machinery Site No.1 was located to the west of the Madam Berry leasehold and to the east of the Creswick-Lawrence road. It operated on a lucrative section of the Australasian lead, which was one of the two primary branches of the Berry Lead system. Among all the mines on the lead system, this mine ranked as the third most productive (following the Madam Berry and Berry Consols mines) and proved to be one of the most profitable during the 1890s. It employed a workforce ranging from 180 to 350 individuals. The No. 1 shaft has an extensive mullock dump and engine foundations indicate machinery typical of that period. It was classified in August 1988.

The Lord Harry Gold Mining Co Mine & Machinery on the northern slope of Birch Hill was one of the minor gold producers within the leads system. It faced significant challenges with water and, like several other small mines locally, it earned the nickname "the water tank." Pumping operations were executed using a non-condensing horizontal steam engine with a 66 cm cylinder, one of the largest of its kind ever installed in a Victorian mine. This engine powered 46 cm pumps. The mullock dump at this mine is exceptionally well-preserved, and the shaft remains open, with one of the original boilers still present on the site. This mine serves as a representative example of smaller mining operations in the area that failed to attain profitability; the main hindrance being the shareholders' inability to provide sufficient capital to overcome its considerable challenges.

Other ruins include Bunyan FHD Mine at 101 Stag Road Kingston, and Colthards Fhd Mine at 171 Stag Road Kingston, which are on the Victorian Heritage Inventory.

=== Buildings ===
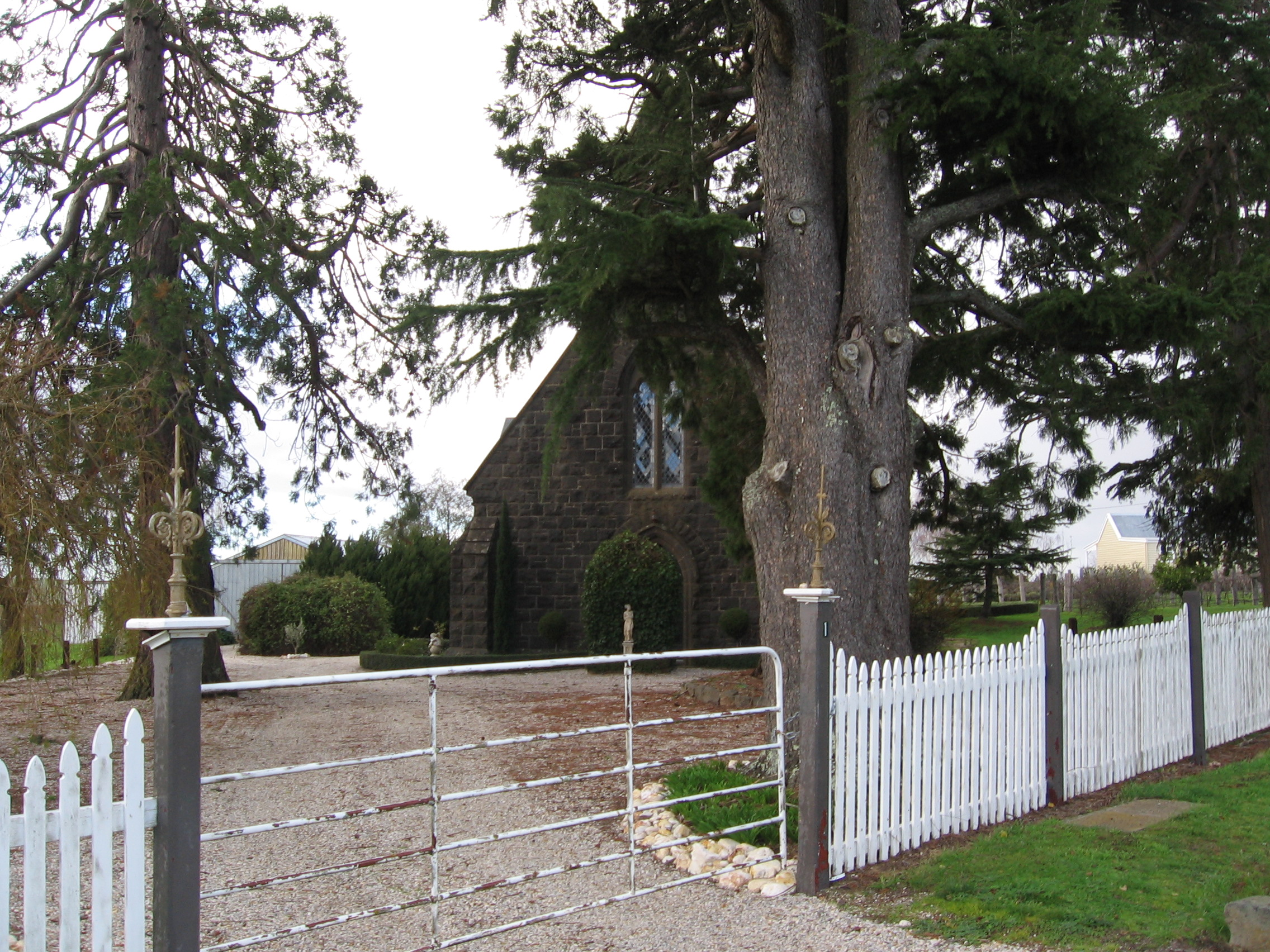
Former Holy Trinity Church of England, now a private residence

Kingston still retains some of its old buildings including the restored Commercial Hotel with others now owned privately, including the Former Creswick Shire Hall, the old Mechanics' Hall in Main Street, and the Primary School.

The small former Holy Trinity Church of England at the north end of the town is notable as a bluestone church with three bays. Designed by Leonard Terry and constructed between 1862 and 1864, it was classified in 1977 for its unique truncated proportions, sturdy masonry bellcote, plate traceried west window, and cusp-headed side windows.

The former Methodist Church (latterly Uniting) in Main Street is a Wesleyan chapel classified in 1987. The Ballarat architect Joseph Attwood Doane designed it in 1868 in a simplified Lombardy Romanesque style with bichrome brickwork.

In the Showgrounds off Church Parade (Kingston-Allendale Road), the Grandstand, constructed at Smeaton in 1902 and moved to its present location in 1922 for better railway access, is a well-preserved timber building with barrel vault and skillion corrugated iron roofs. On 27 March 1997 it was added to the Victorian Heritage Register (VHR) Number H1300.

A Heritage-listed Avenue of Honour of 285 elm trees is dedicated to those who served in World War I, and roadside memorials commemorate service personnel of both Worlds Wars, and the Borneo, Korea, and Vietnam conflicts.

== Education ==
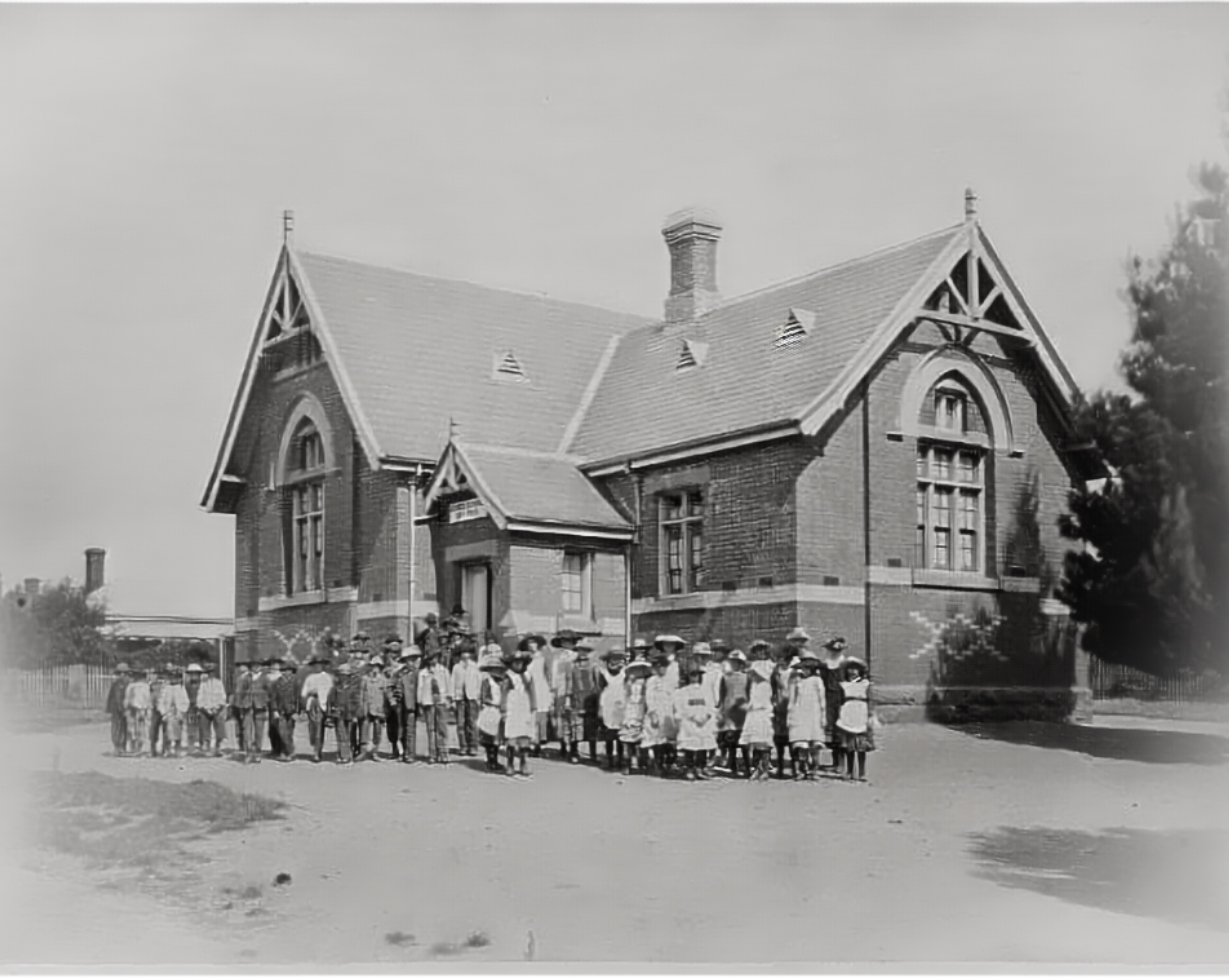
Kingston Primary School in 1909

In 1865, in a brick school building and teacher's house finished in the previous year at 360 Kingston Road, the town opened a 'common school' under its first head teacher Joshua Thomas. During the twentieth century enrolments fluctuated between 100 and 160 and in periods when the school became overcrowded classes were relocated to the Church of England. In 1970 its name was changed to Kingston Primary School, number 759.

In December 2004, Kingston Primary School, following years of lack of support by local parents, closed its doors due to declining enrolments after 142 years. The school's original solid brick school building, extra classrooms, a toilet block and shedding were auctioned for A$331,000 in October 2006 and became a private residence and is protected under a Hepburn Shire Council heritage overlay. Subsequently, with the 2013 closure of nearby Smeaton Primary School, children travel even greater distances to the larger schools in Creswick or Daylesford.

The 2021 Census counted 7 primary students, 5 at secondary, and 7 university or other tertiary students. There were 22 families with children, an average of 1.6 per family, with 8 pre-school children aged 0–4 years.

== Notable residents ==
- Arthur Harold Brownbill (1898–1917) killed in action at Gallipoli in WWI
- William Roy Hodgson (1892-1958), soldier and public servant, ambassador
- Louis Edward Shapcott (1877–1950); public servant in West Australian Premiers' Department, serving seven Premiers 1914-41
- Miles Staniforth Cater Smith (1869-1934), politician and administrator, municipal councillor in 1898, mayor of Kalgoorlie in 1900-01, senator in the first federal government after Federation
