= Allendale, Victoria =

Allendale
- Town
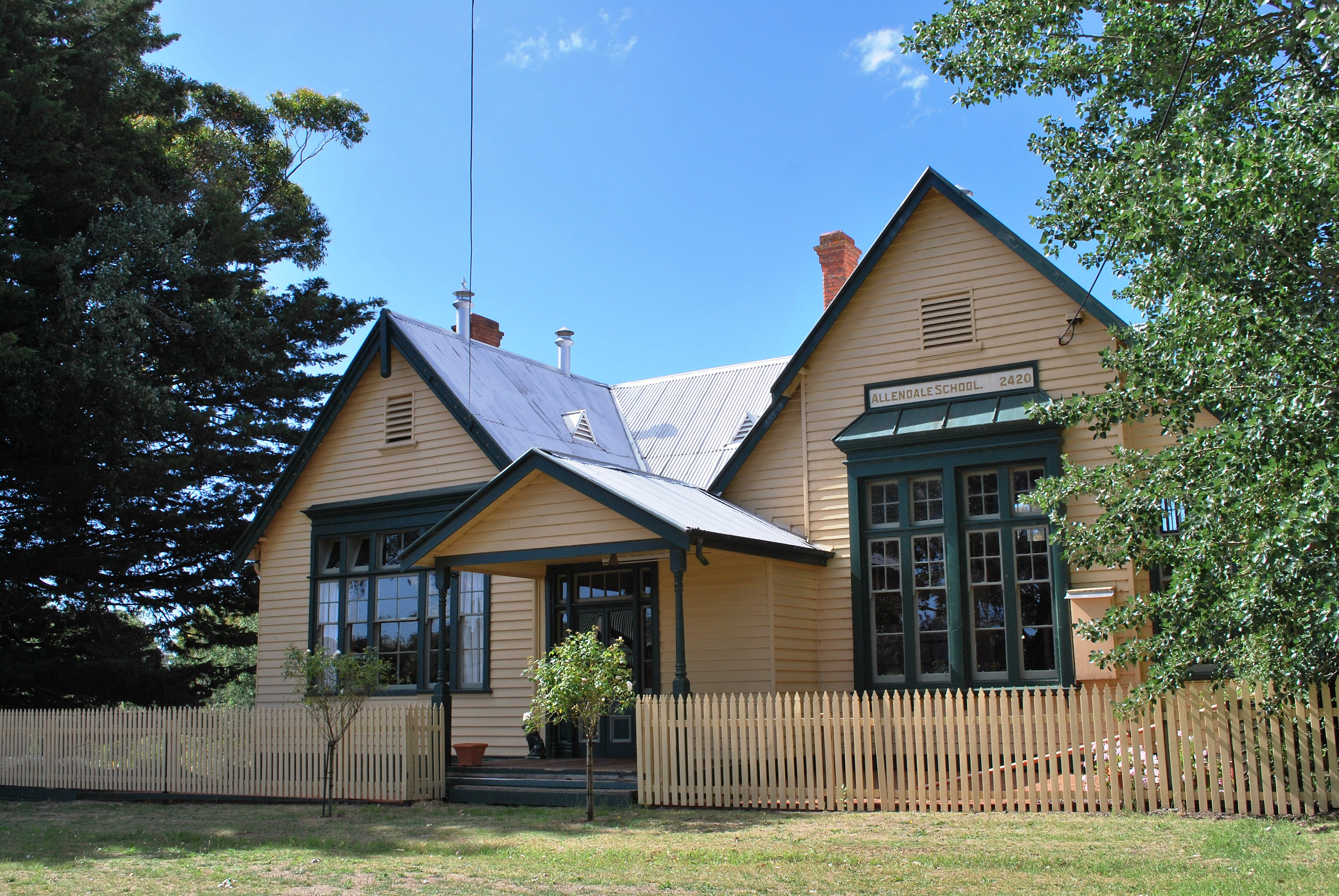
- Former school

- Coordinates: 37°22′S 143°56′E
- Country: Australia
- State: Victoria
- LGA: Shire of Hepburn
- Location: 140 km (87 mi) WNW of Melbourne; 26 km (16 mi) N of Ballarat; 9 km (5.6 mi) N of Creswick; 3 km (1.9 mi) W of Kingston

Government
  - State electorate: Ripon
  - Federal division: Ballarat

Population
  - Total: 185 (2021 census)
- Postcode: 3364

Allendale (aka Allandale) is a town in Victoria, Australia, located north-east of Creswick, in the Shire of Hepburn. At the 2021 census, Allendale and the surrounding area had a population of 185.

The town began as a mining settlement around the Berry Leads mining area. It had a peak population of about 1,500. Allendale once had ten hotels, railway station, post office, bakery, and shops, all of which have closed. The small boarding school located in Leishman Street was sold in 2005. Allendale Post Office opened on 6 May 1881, was known as Allandale from 1885 to 1893, and closed in 1974.

Allendale Railway Station was on the North Creswick to Daylesford line. The railway closed in sections with Allendale to Newlyn closed on 1 December 1976, and from North Creswick to Allendale on 8 December 1986.

== Sports ==
Allendale Football Club

The Allendale FC was formed at a meeting at Dibdin's Hall, Allendale in June 1882. The club had a reasonable amount of success in its early years, winning local premiership in 1892, 1895, 1897 and were runners up in 1894 and 1907.
