= Electoral district of Macedon =

State electoral district of Victoria, Australia

Macedon Victoria—Legislative Assembly
- Interactive map of electoral district boundaries from the 2022 state election
- State: Victoria
- Created: 2002
- MP: Mary-Anne Thomas
- Party: Labor Party
- Namesake: Macedon, Victoria
- Electors: 45,491 (2018)
- Area: 3,366 km^{2} (1,299.6 sq mi)
- Demographic: Rural
Electorates around Macedon:
Bendigo West	Bendigo East	Euroa
Ripon	Macedon	Kalkallo
Eureka	Melton	Sunbury

The electoral district of Macedon is an electoral district of the Victorian Legislative Assembly. It was created in 2002, replacing the abolished electorate of Gisborne. It was won at that election by Joanne Duncan, the former member for Gisborne. She was re-elected in 2006 and 2010, and retired at the 2014 election, at which she was succeeded by Labor candidate Mary-Anne Thomas.

== Members for Macedon ==
Member	Party	Term
Joanne Duncan	Labor	2002–2014
Mary-Anne Thomas	Labor	2014–2026

== Election results ==
2022 Victorian state election: Macedon
Party	Candidate	Votes	%	±%
Labor	Mary-Anne Thomas	17,234	41.4	−6.6
Liberal	Dominic Bonanno	12,463	30.0	−1.9
Greens	Marley McRae McLeod	5,214	12.5	+2.6
Independent	Huntly Barton	2,250	5.4	+5.4
One Nation	Amanda Evezard	1,511	3.6	+3.6
Animal Justice	Iris Bergmann	1,356	3.3	−0.7
Family First	Chris McCormack	791	1.9	+1.9
Freedom	Kerryn P. Sedgman	770	1.9	+1.9
Total formal votes		41,589	95.5	+0.2
Informal votes		1,974	4.5	−0.2
Turnout		43,563	90.7	+1.2
Two-party-preferred result
Labor	Mary-Anne Thomas	24,762	59.5	−3.8
Liberal	Dominic Bonanno	16,827	40.5	+3.8
Labor hold		Swing	−3.8	

== See also ==
- Parliaments of the Australian states and territories
- List of members of the Victorian Legislative Assembly
