= Strangways, Victoria =

Rural location in Victoria, Australia

Strangways
- Town
- Coordinates: 37°8′37″S 144°6′12″E
- Country: Australia
- State: Victoria
- LGAs: Shire of Mount Alexander; Shire of Hepburn

Government
  - State electorates: Bendigo West; Macedon
  - Federal divisions: Bendigo; Ballarat

Population
  - Total: 101 (2021 census)
- Postcode: 3461

Strangways is a locality in the Shire of Hepburn and Mount Alexander Shire, in Central Victoria, Australia. It covers an area of 20.105 square kilometres between the townships of Guidford to the east, Newstead to the north-west and Clydesdale to the south.

== History ==
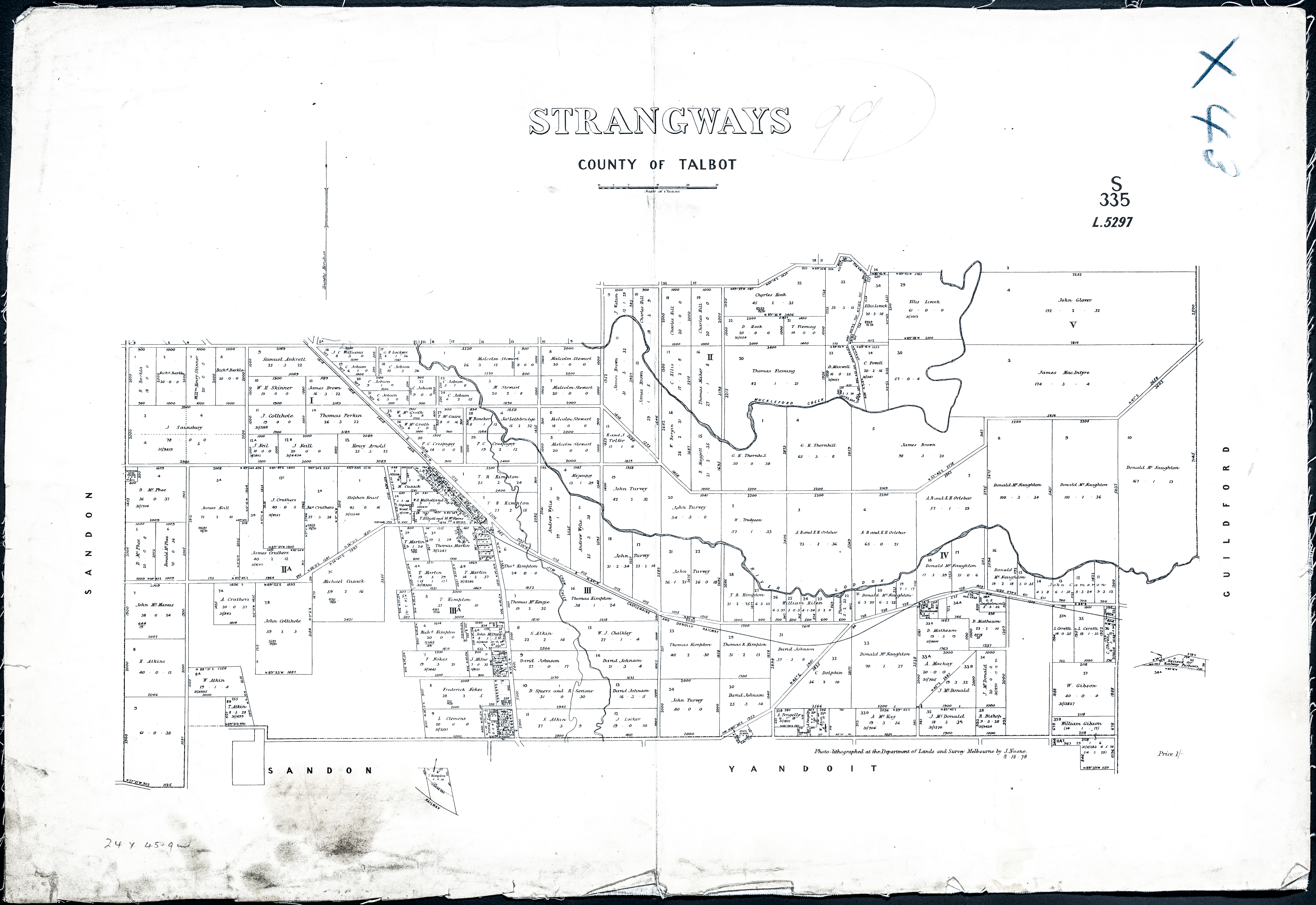
Strangways, County of Talbot, Victoria. Department of Crown Lands and Survey & Noone, John. (1878).

The original inhabitants of Strangways are the Gunangara gundidj clan of the Dja Dja Wurrung. A census undertaken in 1840 recorded 282 Dja Dja Wurrung, considerably fewer than Thomas Mitchell’s estimate of 900–1900 when he passed through their territory in 1836. In early 1841 the Loddon Valley at Strangways was considered but rejected as a Protectorate site, in favour of Mount Franklin (Lalgambook). Betraying a common attitude in 1868 the Mount Alexander Mail Strangways 'correspondent,' in discussing snakes in the district, by then under cultivation, reported;

...blackfellows, are rapidly and happily passing to the extinction that awaits inferior and noxious races, when exposed to the influence of superior natures...

A change in attitude to First Peoples was apparent in moves in 2021 by Mount Alexander Shire Council in conjunction with Hepburn Shire Council, North Central Catchment Management Authority and DJAARA (formerly the Dja Dja Wurrung Clans Aboriginal Corporation) to rename Jim Crow Creek, first applied to the area of Lalgambook/Mt Franklin by Captain John Hepburn in the 1830’s. The creek runs 26 km through from Breakneck Gorge in Hepburn Regional Park, joining the Loddon River below the Guildford Plateau at Strangways. Both Hepburn Shire Council and Mount Alexander Shire Councils voted unanimously in April 2022 to call it Larni Barramal Yaluk (Home of the Emu Creek) in Dja Dja Wurrung language because the term ‘Jim Crow’ is derogatory and stems from international racial segregation and anti-black racism prevalent also in colonial Australia. Councillor Tim Drylie of Hepburn Shire reported that “Council conducted significant community engagement on the renaming, and it was clear that there was overwhelming support for the new name.” In that shire the total overall result of the feedback during the consultation period of the period of 30 September to 12 November 2021 was 187 in support (including 41 tacit approval) and 30 objectors.

=== Non-indigenous settlement ===
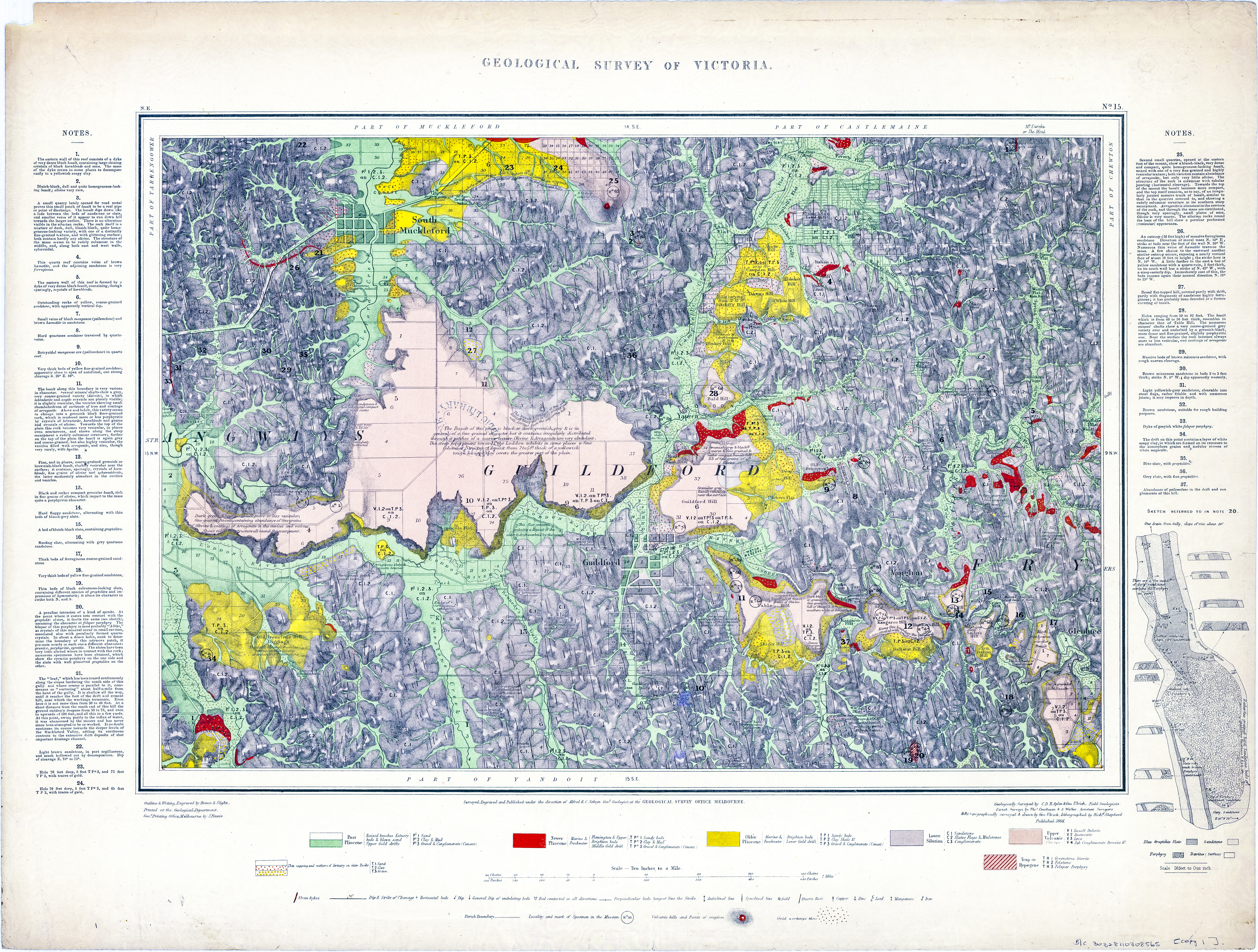
Geological Survey Of Victoria : Parts of parishes of Muckleford, Castlemaine, Chewton, Yandoit, Strangways, Guildford and Tarrengowee

By 1841 the future township and surrounds of Strangways were occupied by sheep runs. After the discovery of gold in Central Victoria in 1851, alluvial deposits were found in the Loddon River at Strangways and in its tributaries. By the end of 1855 there were big rushes around the nearby Yandoit area (then known as Zandit), Nuggetty Gully area and tunnelling in the King William Gully on the north-west side of Yandoit Creek hills. These diggings continued north to Clydesdale and Strangways near the Loddon. Chinese established a camp with a population of up to three thousand diggers at the junction of Jim Crow Creek and the Loddon near Strangways. Chinese miners also worked Pickpocket Hill from November 1860 to 1864 and established market gardens along the Loddon.

=== Surveys ===
Sir Richard Graves McDonnel, Governor of South Australia is reputed to have explored Strangways and Loddon Springs in 1858. However the Surveyor General's Office, Melbourne had already issued a plan of an allotment abutting Muckleford Creek in the area it listed in 1856 as the Parish of Strangways.

A geological survey of the area in which Strangways is named was undertaken by Government Geologist Alfred R.C. Selwyn, and the map by geologists C.D.H. Aplin & George Urich, overlain with parish surveys by Thomas Couchman & A. Walker, published by the Geological Survey Office Melbourne in 1864. The map names Pickpocket Hill and Old Ironstone Hill diggings in the southern part of Strangways.

=== Naming ===
Strangways was probably named after a British artillery commander Brigadier General Sir Thomas Fox-Strangways, KCB killed at the Battle of Inkerman in the Crimea in 1854. South Australian Henry Bull Templar Strangways (1832–1920), lawyer and politician, was born too late to be a contender.

=== Township ===
In the alluvial gold-mining days Strangways had several hotels, a store and Martin's blacksmith's forge. A large hall at the Strangways Hotel was the venue for balls during the Newstead Show and the Oddfellows' anniversaries.

The township and district were administered by the Shire of Newstead from 7 March 1865 until an amalgamation into the municipality of Mount Alexander was instituted by the Kennett government on 20 January 1995.

=== Mining ===
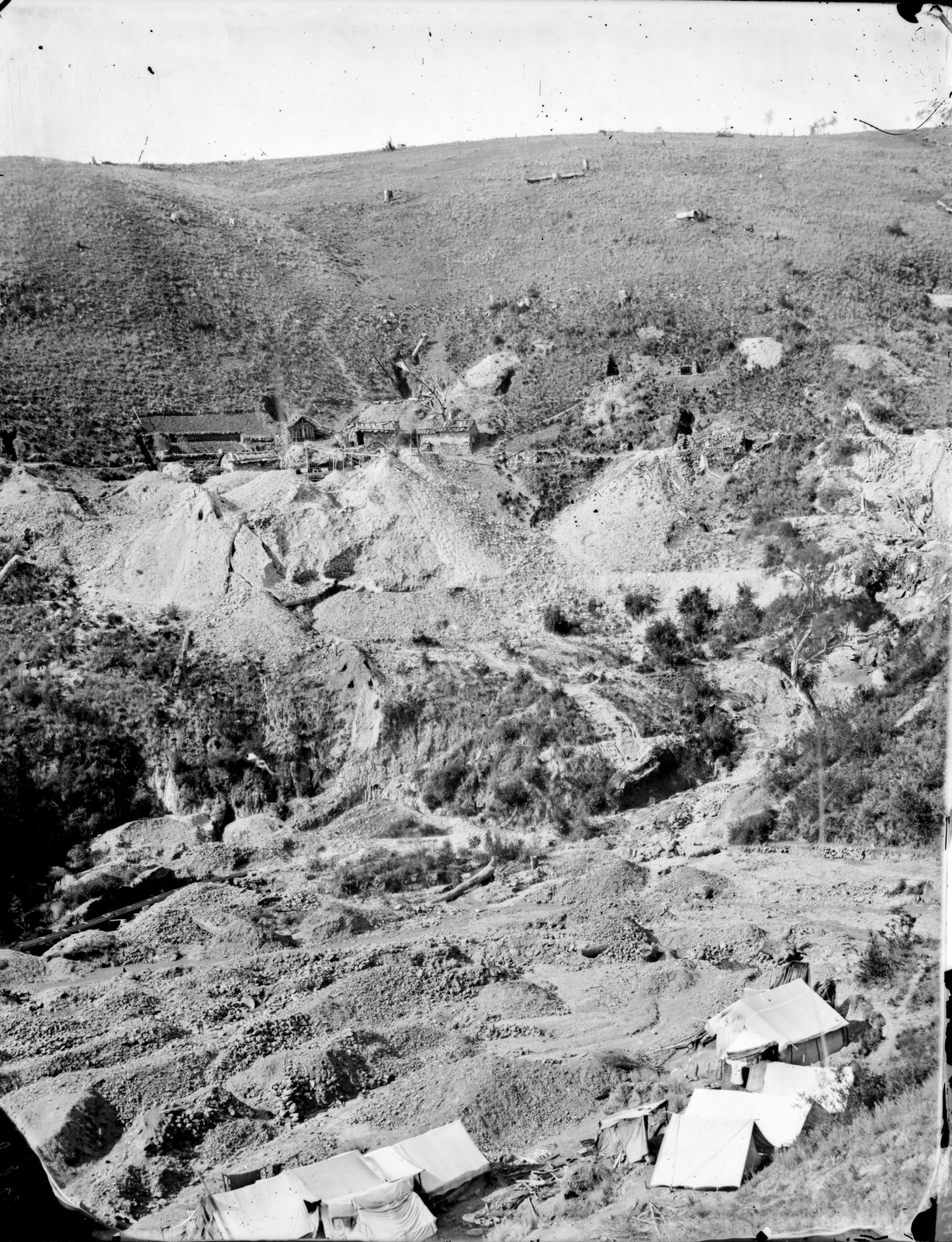
Richard Daintree (1858) Jim-Crow diggings between Strangways and Daylesford

After the rushes subsided by 1865, mining became more organised and industrial. A Newstead and Strangways Prospecting Association was formed in 1873.

=== Farming ===
Sheep, wheat, oats and lucerne were the predominant products of the area. By the 1870s productivity had fallen due to over-cultivation, with wheat harvested at 15 bushels (about 27.2 kg) per acre (4,046 sq.m.) fetching 4s to 4s 3d (worth A$27.70 in 2020) per bushel.

=== Churches ===
After the goldfield opened, Wesleyans held services in a barn at Strangways in the early 1860s. They erected a timber church in 1865, followed by a building in stone.

=== Schools ===
On 11 January 1864 Robert A. Richardson, Head Teacher, opened the first school in the Strangways area, Common School 705 Strangways, about 1.6 km from the Strangways railway station and 6.5 km from Newstead. In its opening year it was attended by 31 children. Closed on 30 September 1870 it was replaced by No. 1064 Strangways which was in tum replaced by No.1538 Strangways in a surviving school building, constructed of pale pink-red bricks probably made in the area and an iron gable roof over a single classroom 15m x 6.4m and with brick porches at either end. Situated 1.2 km south-west of the Strangways Railway Siding, it was opened in about 1875 and was somewhat larger than contemporaneous country schools and was the largest school erected in the area., After 1872 most existing schools converted to State Schools, but two new schools were built at Strangways in 1873. The unnamed Strangways correspondent for the Mount Alexander Mail, referring to the compulsory free secular education newly legislated, opined;

The Education Act in this district may be described as working splendidly. The schools are all crowded, and there is not to my knowledge a child in the district capable of attending school whose name is not on one or other of the school rolls. The police, I am pleased to see, are trusted with the onerous duty of looking after such parents as may prove remiss in their duties, and this task they have hitherto performed with a combined firmness and leniency highly becoming under the circumstances. The teachers in the country make no complaint, and in this respect their conduct is in favourable contrast to that of their metropolitan confreres, whose selfish procedure must seriously embarrass the Minister of Public Instruction in his novel and difficult, but all important undertaking.

Because the population fluctuated largely due to the exigencies of alluvial mining and a later gold mining dredge operation 1937-1954 which ceased because of rising costs, the school was opened and closed many times, first in 1936, then reopened on 25 July 1938, closed in December 1959, reopened on 6 February 1962 and finally closed on 18 December 1964, with the building eventually sold by the Department of Education in June 1997.

Only primary schools were built in the Shire. Children attended Castlemaine high school after its founding in 1910 and the technical school from 1916. Many from Strangways caught the train to Castlemaine, with 800 boarding a trip from Maryborough to celebrate the opening of the line in 1874, and after 1947 a school bus service was commenced.

=== Railway and telegraph lines ===
The Castlemaine and Maryborough railway, known as the Moolort line, was started in September 1872 raising local concerns over the effect trains would have on horses. Its course and construction of its first section from Castlemaine to Newstead was described in the Melbourne Argus;

...at Strangways, a township on the banks of the Jim Crow Creek, about two miles from Newstead [the] creek, which is of considerable width, and is approached by a long low flat, will be crossed by a similar bridge to that over the Loddon. The line will be constructed upon economic principles. The width of gauge will be 5ft. 3in., so that although the cost of construction will be greatly reduced even in comparison with the North Eastern line, the railway will not be built upon what is known as the narrow gauge or cheap principle. All the bridges and culverts will be of wood instead of iron or stone. The redgum required for the sleepers and piles will be procured from the Murray district, and the posts and rails for fencing from the Bullarook forest near Daylesford. The contract price of the first section is £19,500 [A$2,492,000.00 value in 2021]. The contractor will have to lay, but not supply, the rails and the stations will form a separate contract. The ruling gradient on the first section is 1 in 50, and the heaviest 1 in 43. Active operations will be commenced to-day, and before the expiration of the week it is expected that about 300 men will be employed. The average rate of wages given will be about 6s. 6d. per day for navvies. It is anticipated that unless something unforeseen occurs, the first section will be completed within 13 months. Mr. Gibbons is the engineer employed by Mr. Doran, and Mr. Wilkinson will have charge of the line for the Government, under the direction of Mr. Green, the resident engineer.

The line was opened on 7 July 1874 and a siding promised in 1887. There was agitation for a connection from Daylesford via Yandoit but it was refused. In early 1914 Strangways station received part of the £12,000 from the Railway Loan Application Bill for extending and raising the passenger platform and for installing barriers to facilitate the checking of tickets.

At the direction of the Postmaster General, Melbourne, a telegraph line was constructed from Yandoit and along the railway to the Strangways rail crossing gates in 1887.

=== Heritage ===
Strangways has notable colonial- and Victorian-era structures and ruins identified by the Newstead and also the Daylesford/Hepburn Springs Heritage Projects, including eleven Places of Local Significance, two Heritage Desirable Places and three on the Heritage Inventory.

Mining along Larni Barramal Yaluk (Jim Crow Creek) was photographed in 1857/8 on wetplate collodion by Richard Daintree and Antoine Fauchery for their Sun Pictures of Victoria, a copy of which is preserved in the State Library of Victoria.

== Population ==
Thriving until before WW1, and with a school, station, church, hotels and hall, Strangways is now a sparsely populated mixed farming community with traces only of a town centre.

In the 2021 Census, there were 101 people in 52 private dwellings in Strangways; 59.4% male and 40.6% female of a median age of 55 years. The average number of people per household was 2.2, with a median weekly household income of $1,406.

== Notable residents ==
- William Keast (Victorian politician)
- Trefor Prest, sculptor

== See also ==
- Jim Crow goldmines
