= Goldfields (Victoria) =

Region of Victoria, Australia

Coordinates: 37°00′S 143°45′E

- Region
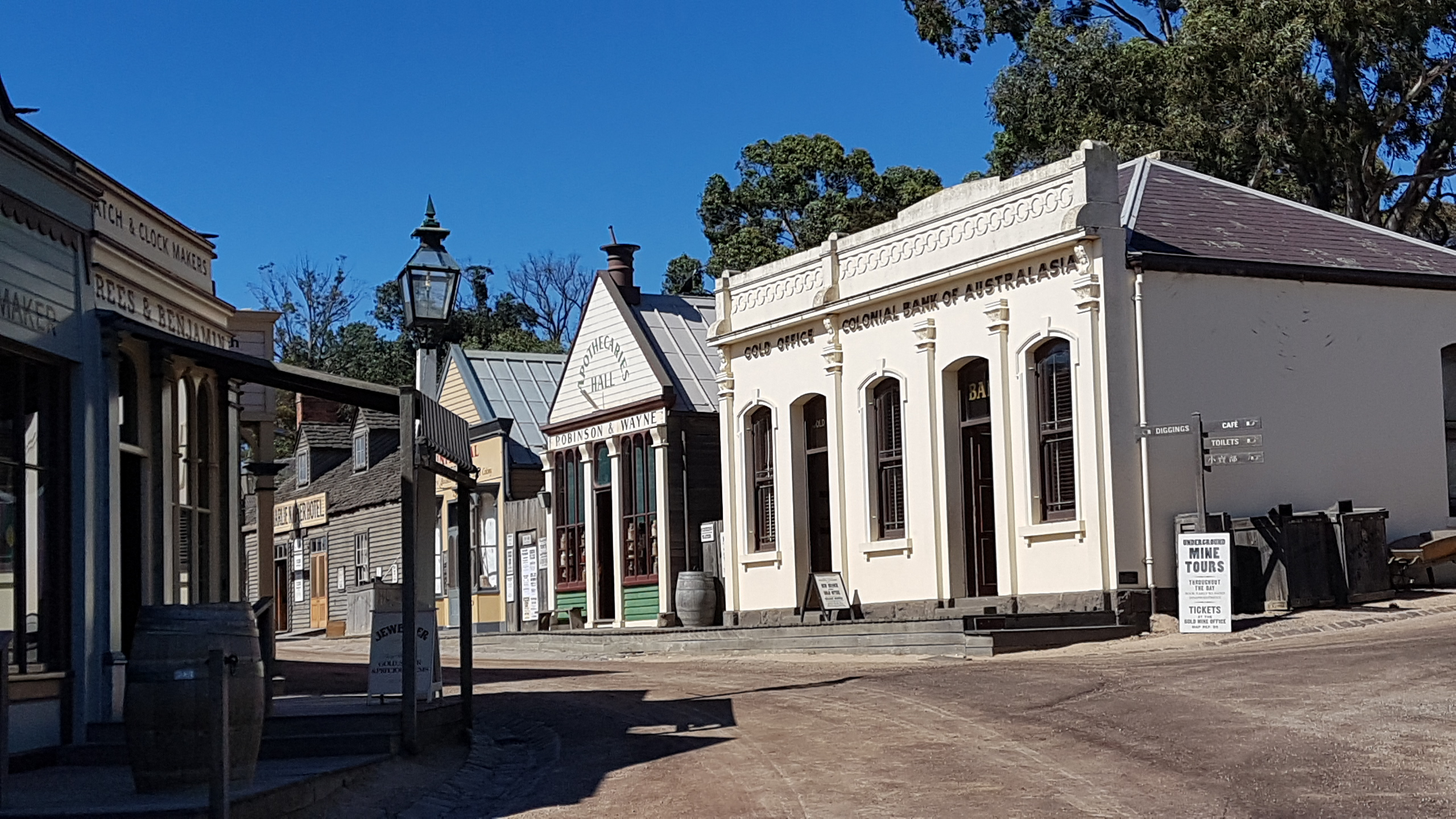
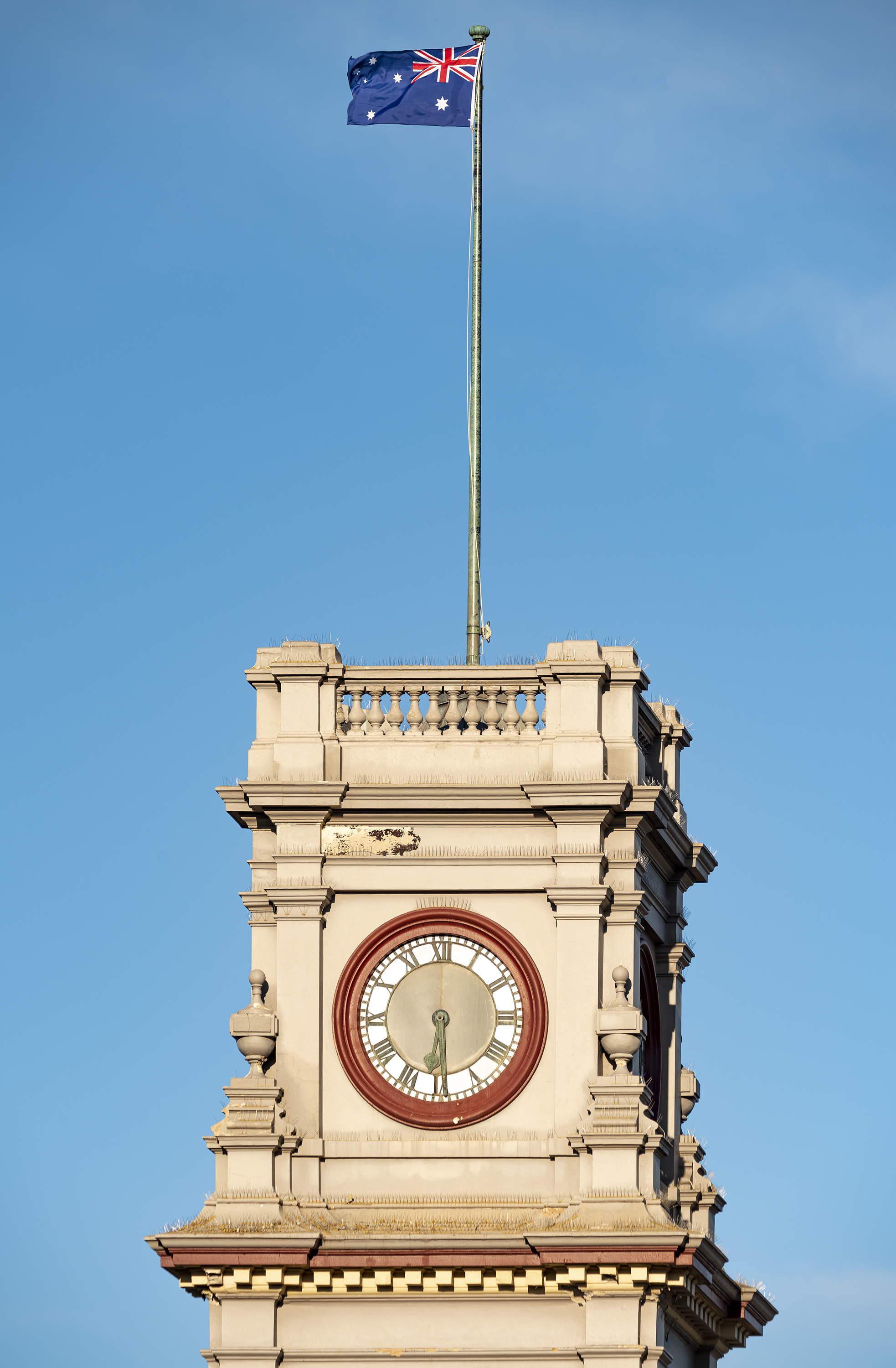
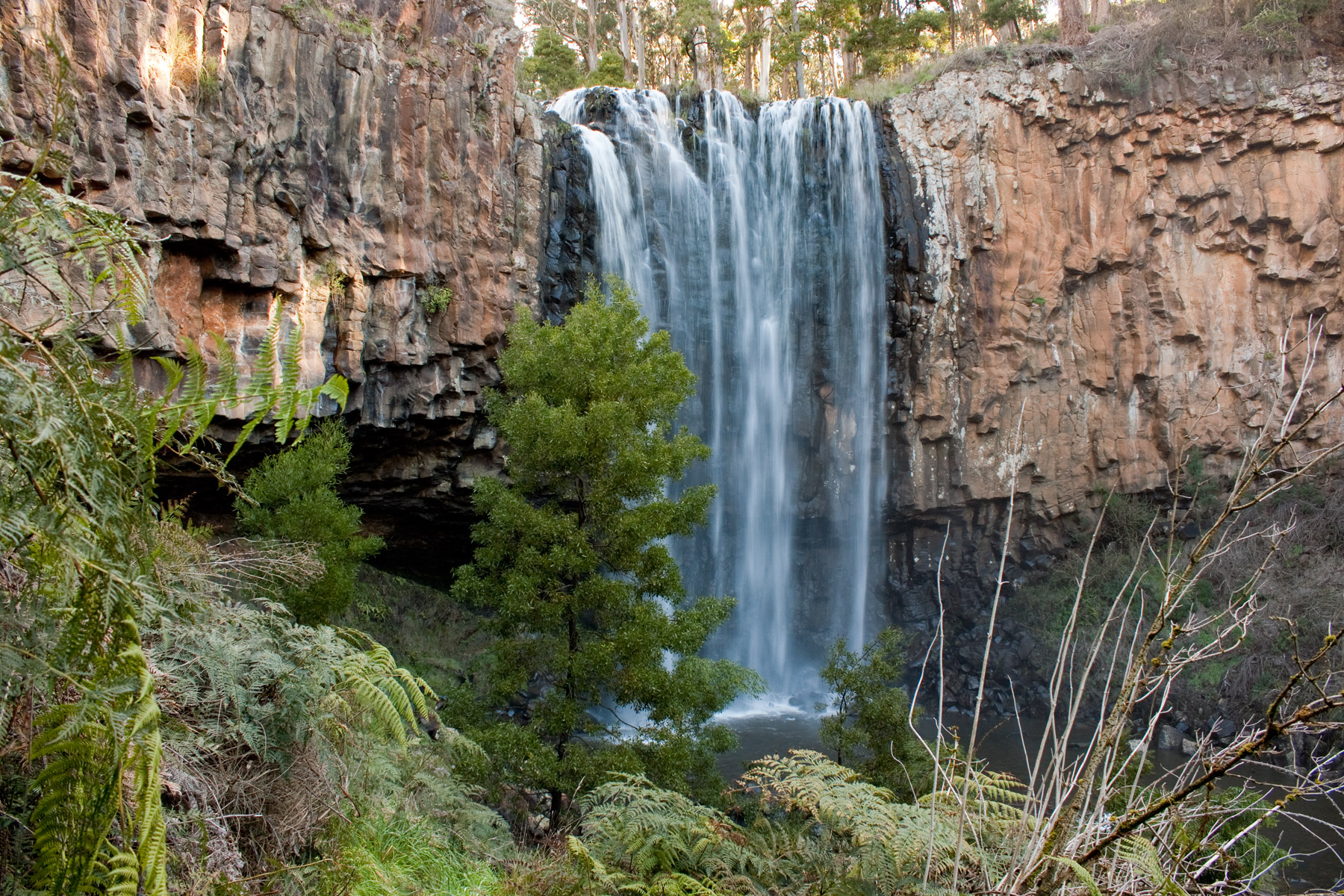
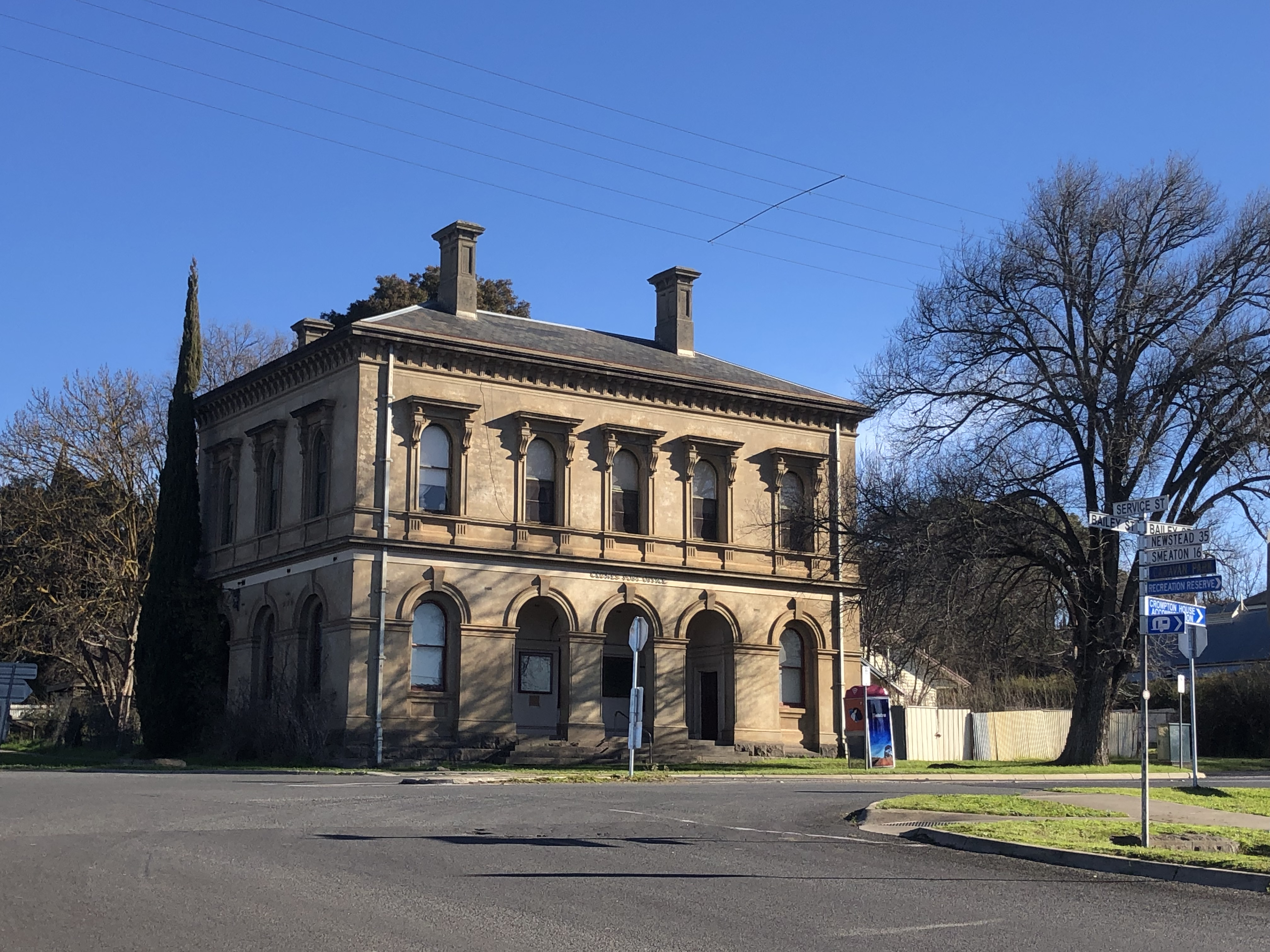
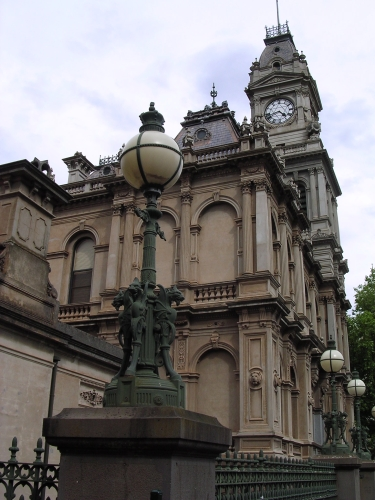
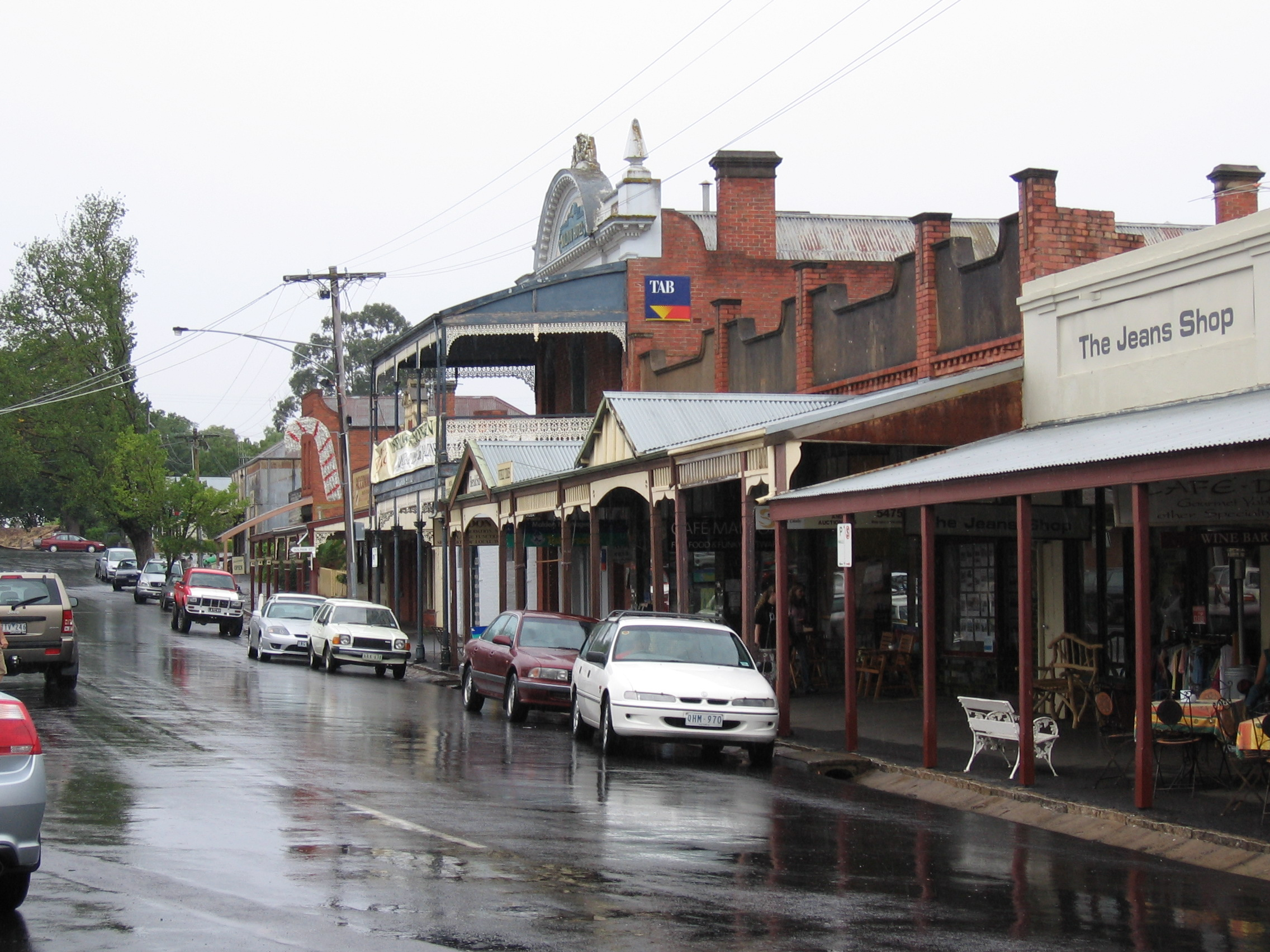
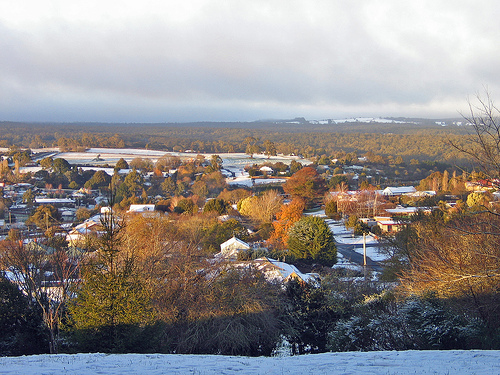
- Sovereign Hill Castlemaine Post Office Trentham Falls The post office at Clunes Bendigo Post Office Maldon Snow in Daylesford
- Country: Australia
- State: Victoria
- Region: Grampians (part); Hume (part); Loddon Mallee (part)
- LGA: Ararat City, Ballarat City, Campaspe, Central Goldfields, Golden Plains, Greater Bendigo, Hepburn, Loddon, Macedon Ranges, Mitchell, Moorabool, Mount Alexander, Northern Grampians, Pyrenees, Strathbogie

Government
  - State electorate: Bendigo East, Bendigo West, Eureka, Euroa, Macedon, Ripon, Wendouree
  - Federal division: Ballarat, Bendigo, Hawke, McEwen, Mallee, Nicholls, Wannon
Regions around Goldfields
Wimmera	Loddon	High Country
Wimmera	Goldfields	High Country
Western District	Western District	Melbourne

The Goldfields region of Victoria is a region associated with the Victorian gold rush in Australia. The term is used in both historical geography and tourism geography (in particular heritage tourism). The region is also known as the Victorian Golden Triangle.

== Description ==
It takes in a specific area of North Central Victoria, the major cities of Ballarat and Bendigo as well as smaller centres including Daylesford, Castlemaine and Maryborough. It extends as far north as Inglewood and St Arnaud. It encroaches on the Western District near Ararat. Other significant towns include Maldon, Creswick, Clunes, Avoca and Buninyong.

Although the region has a strong association with the Victorian gold rush there are, however, significant towns associated with the gold rush and gold mining located outside of this region — notable examples include Warburton, Walhalla, Warrandyte, Chiltern and Beechworth. The goldfields region is more strongly linked to the impact of the Victorian gold rush than the discovery of gold in Victoria.

As a result of the gold rush, the region contains many old buildings, including celebrated examples of Victorian architecture, some of which are heritage listed, while others have fallen into disrepair and become derelict. Many of the towns were far larger during the Gold Rush than they are now, and there are some examples of ghost towns in the region. Major tourism icons include Sovereign Hill, Eureka Stockade site and the Bendigo Talking Tram. The region is also associated with the origins of Australian rules football; Tom Wills, one of the game's founders, grew up outside present-day Moyston, the self-proclaimed "Birthplace of Australian Football". Some of the earliest clubs were also established in the region.

Demographically, the population of the region was approximately 244,900 in 2006. The region has a well-defined road tourist route. The area retains a significant gold mining industry and remains a popular for fossicking.

The Goldfields region is also associated as a viticulture region with a large number of established vineyards and popular wineries. An important ecosystem associated with the region is the Box–ironbark forest, now much fragmented and cleared but still important for the conservation of many birds and other animals.

== Gallery ==
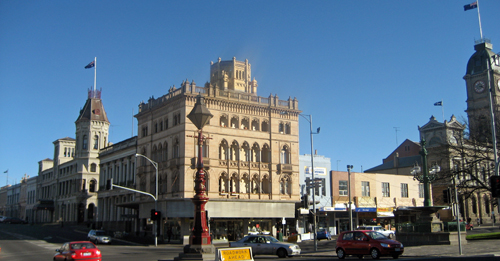
Corner Sturt and Lydiard Streets, Ballarat

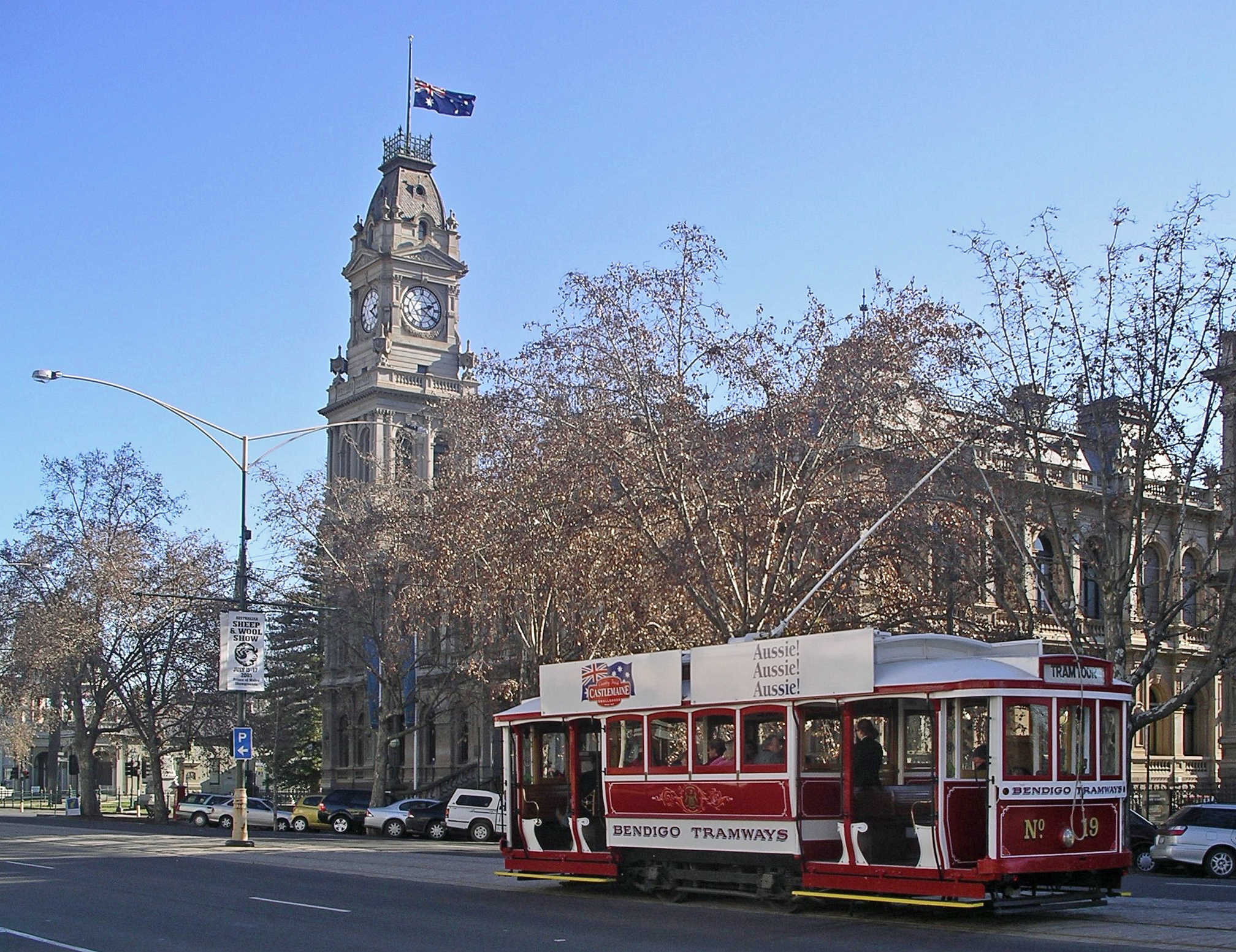
Pall Mall, Bendigo, with Talking Tram

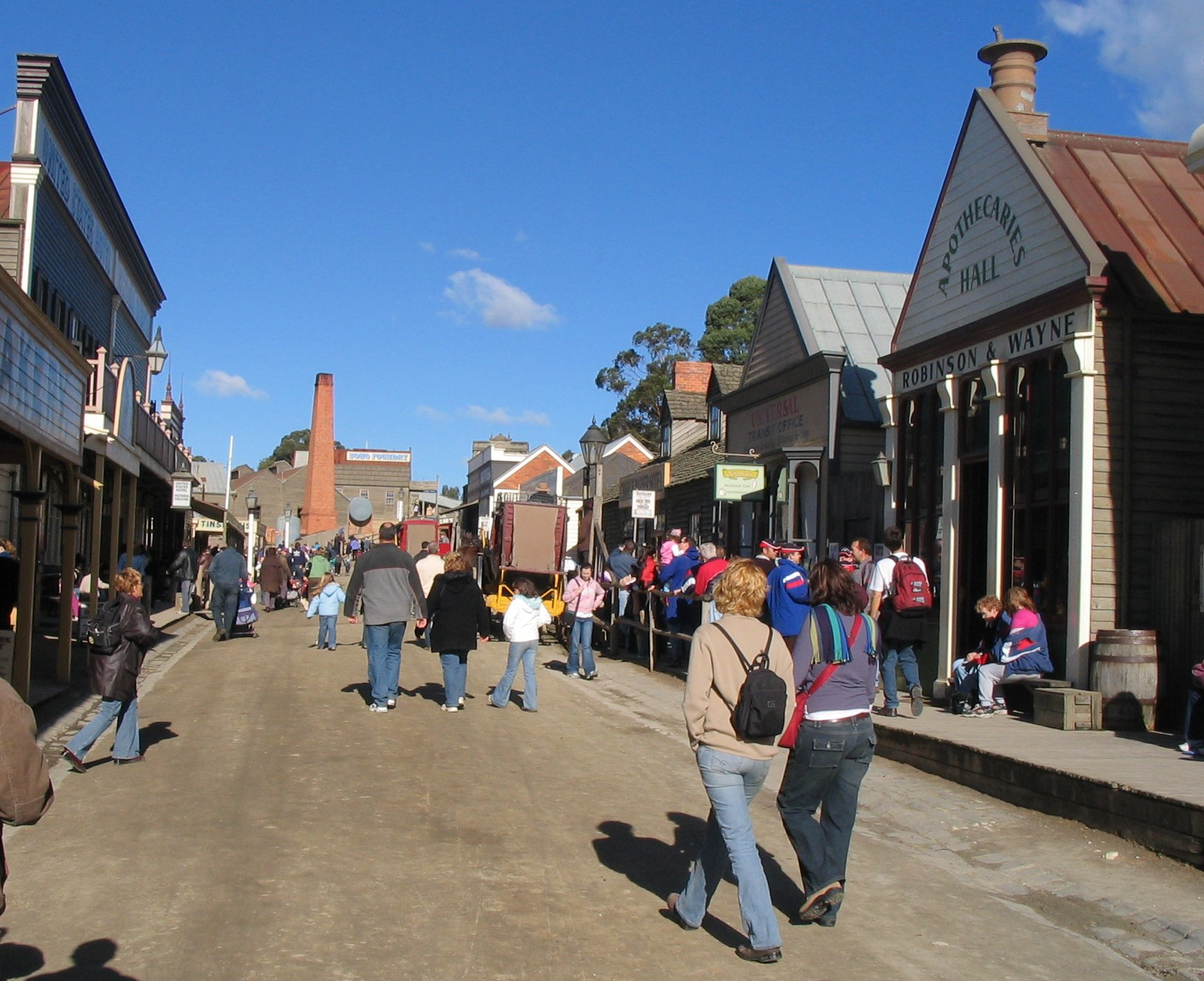
Sovereign Hill open-air museum, a large tourist attraction in Ballarat

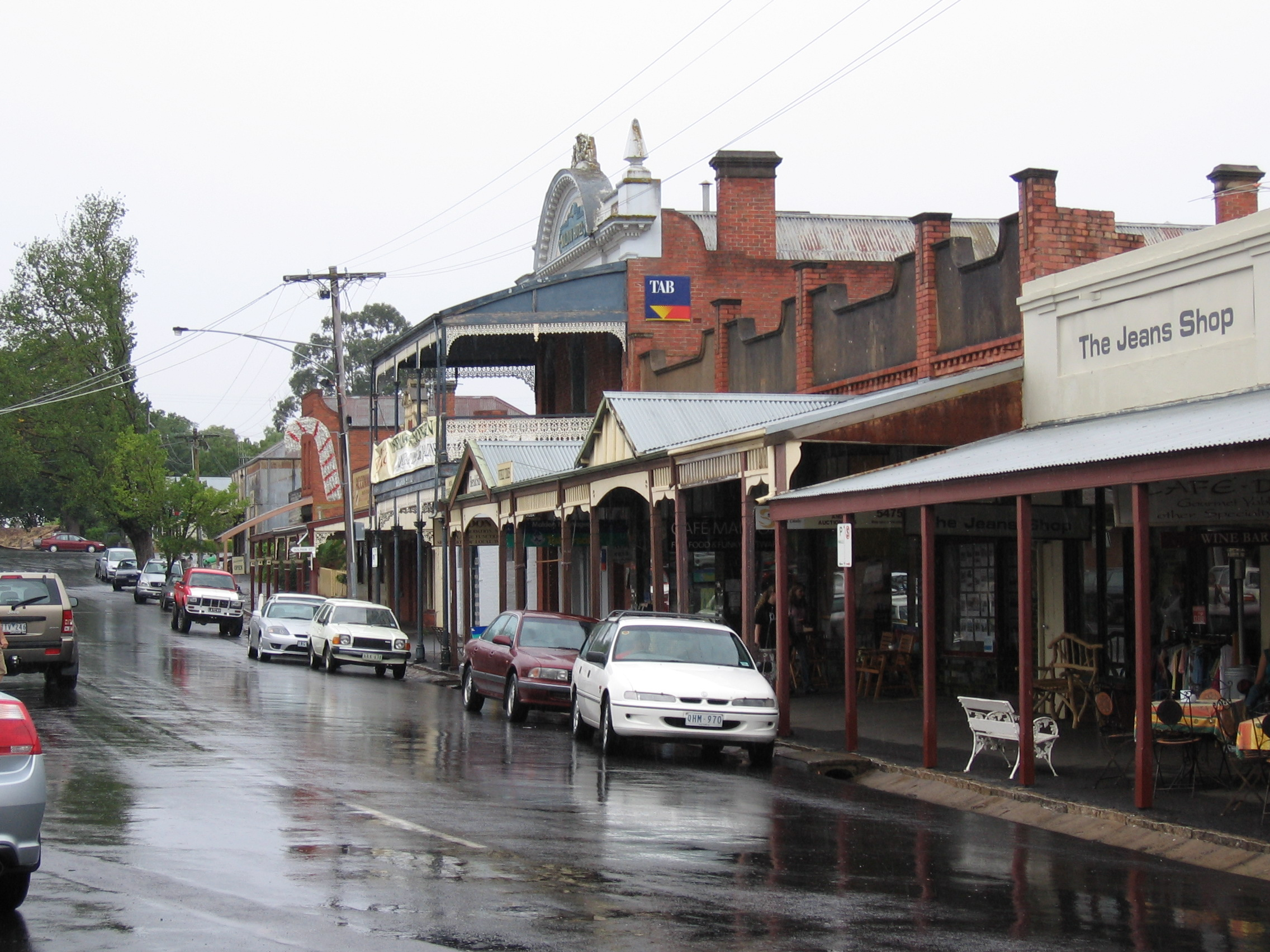
Maldon's famous historic streetscapes

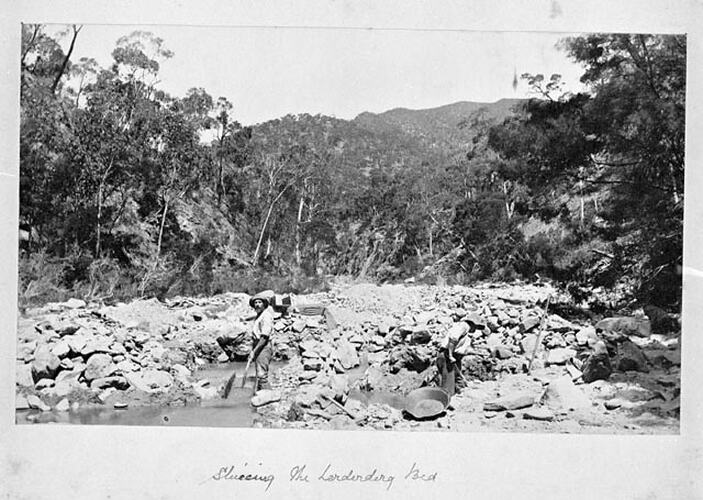
Sluicing in the Lerderderg Gorge, between Blackwood and Bacchus Marsh

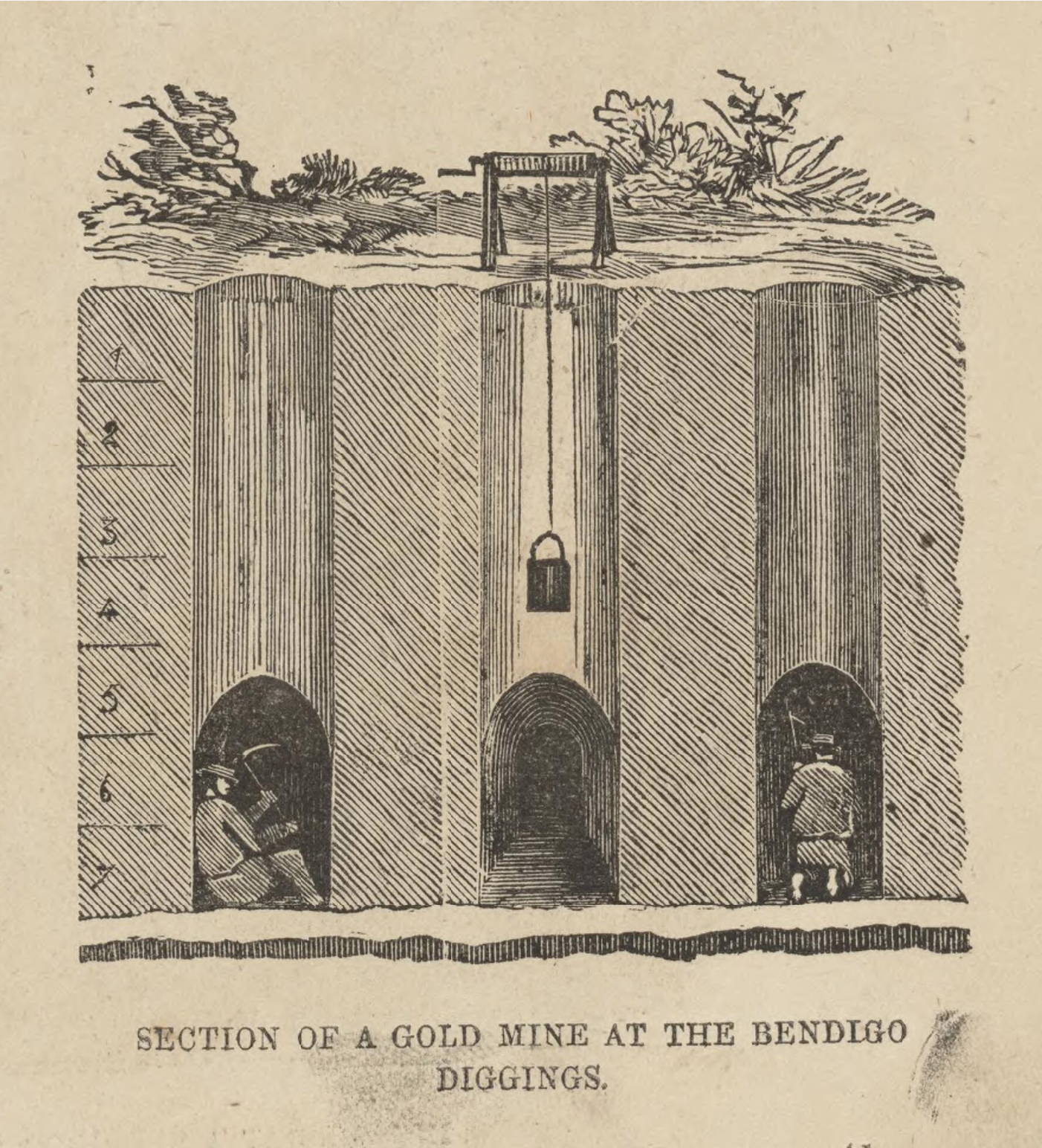
Bendigo diggings gold mine in c.1857 - Bendigo, Victoria, Australia

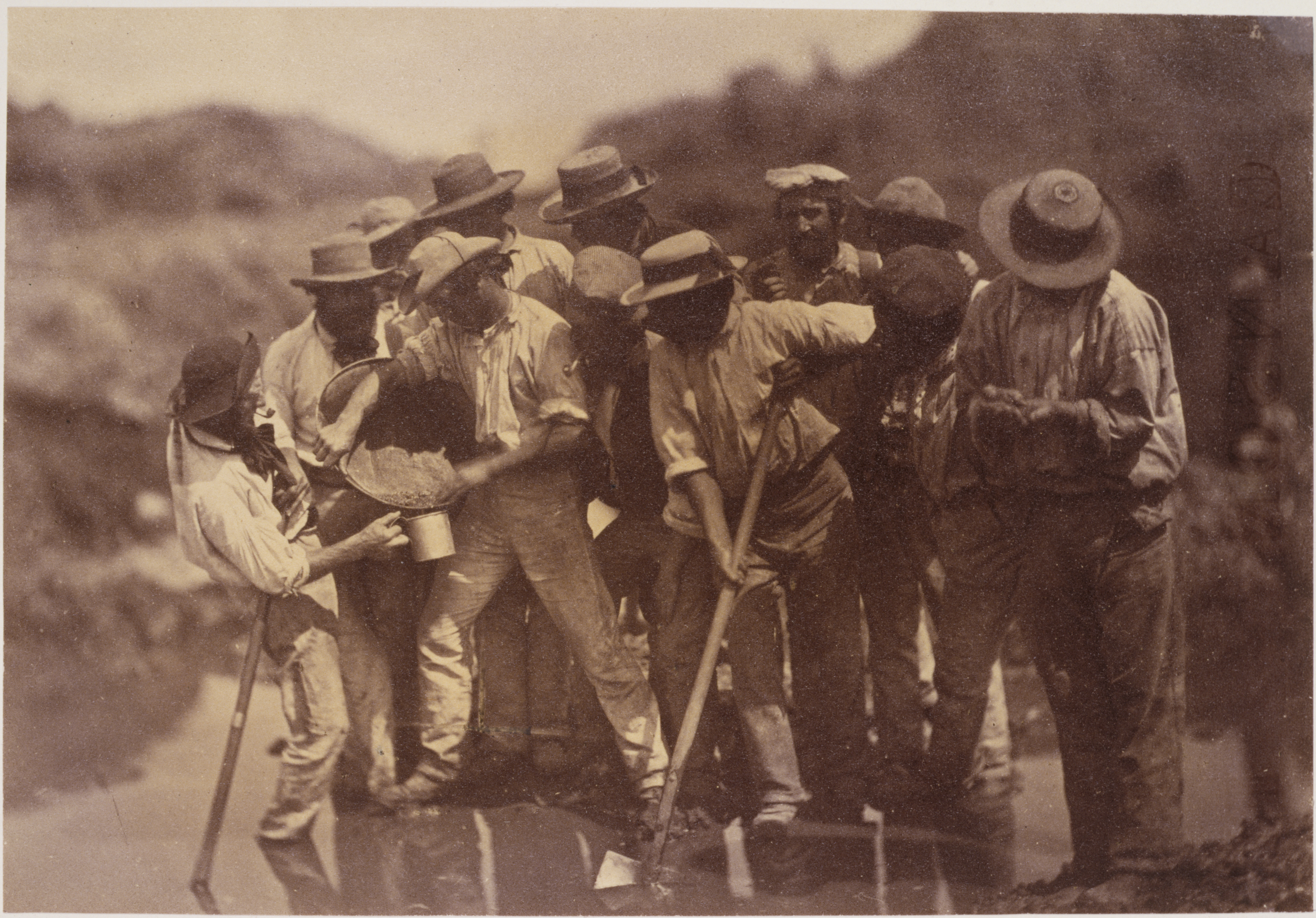
Richard Daintree and Antoine Fauchery (circa 1858) A gang of diggers at Forrest Creek, Chewton

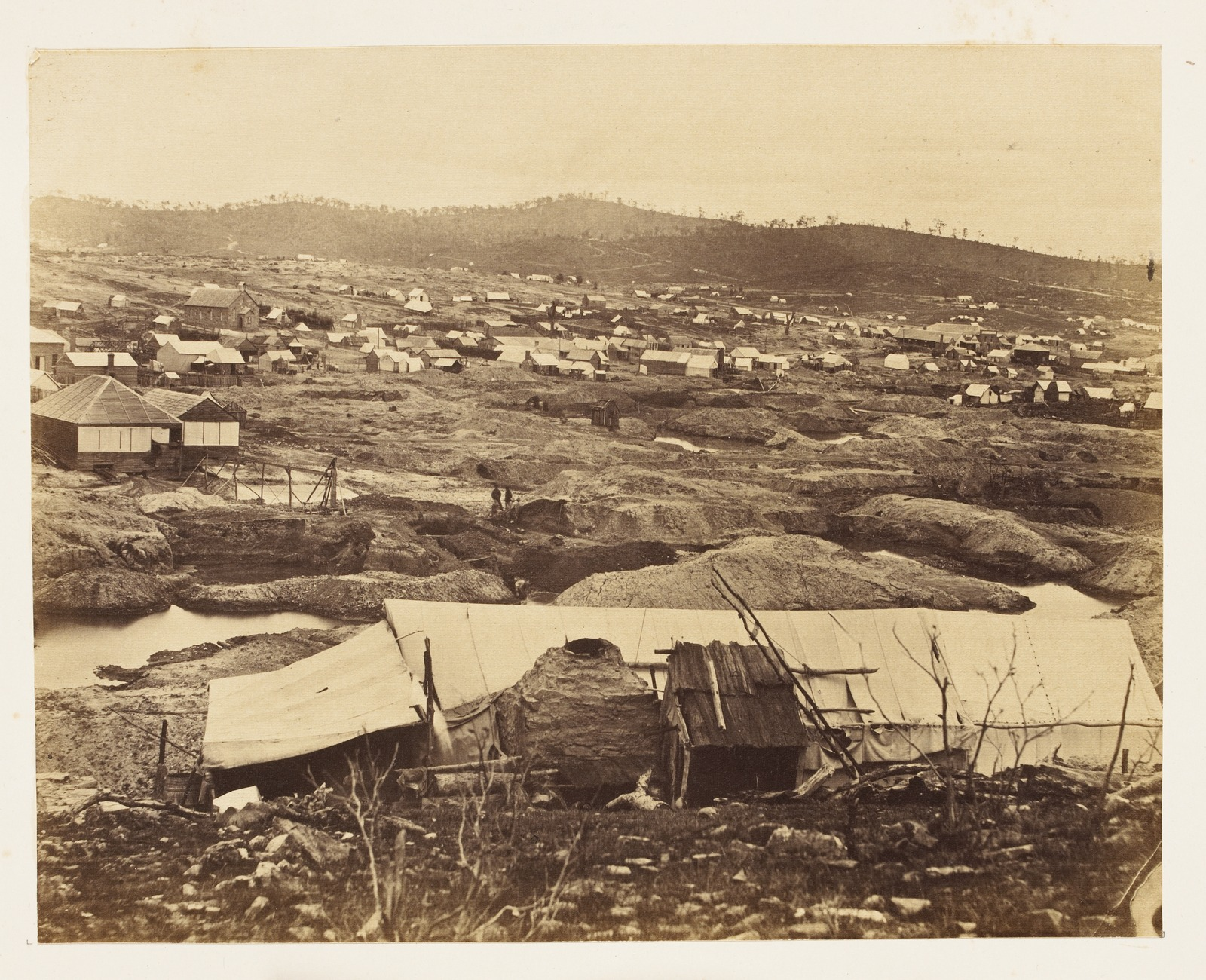
Richard Daintree, Castlemaine gold diggings on 15 January 1858, Forrest Creek

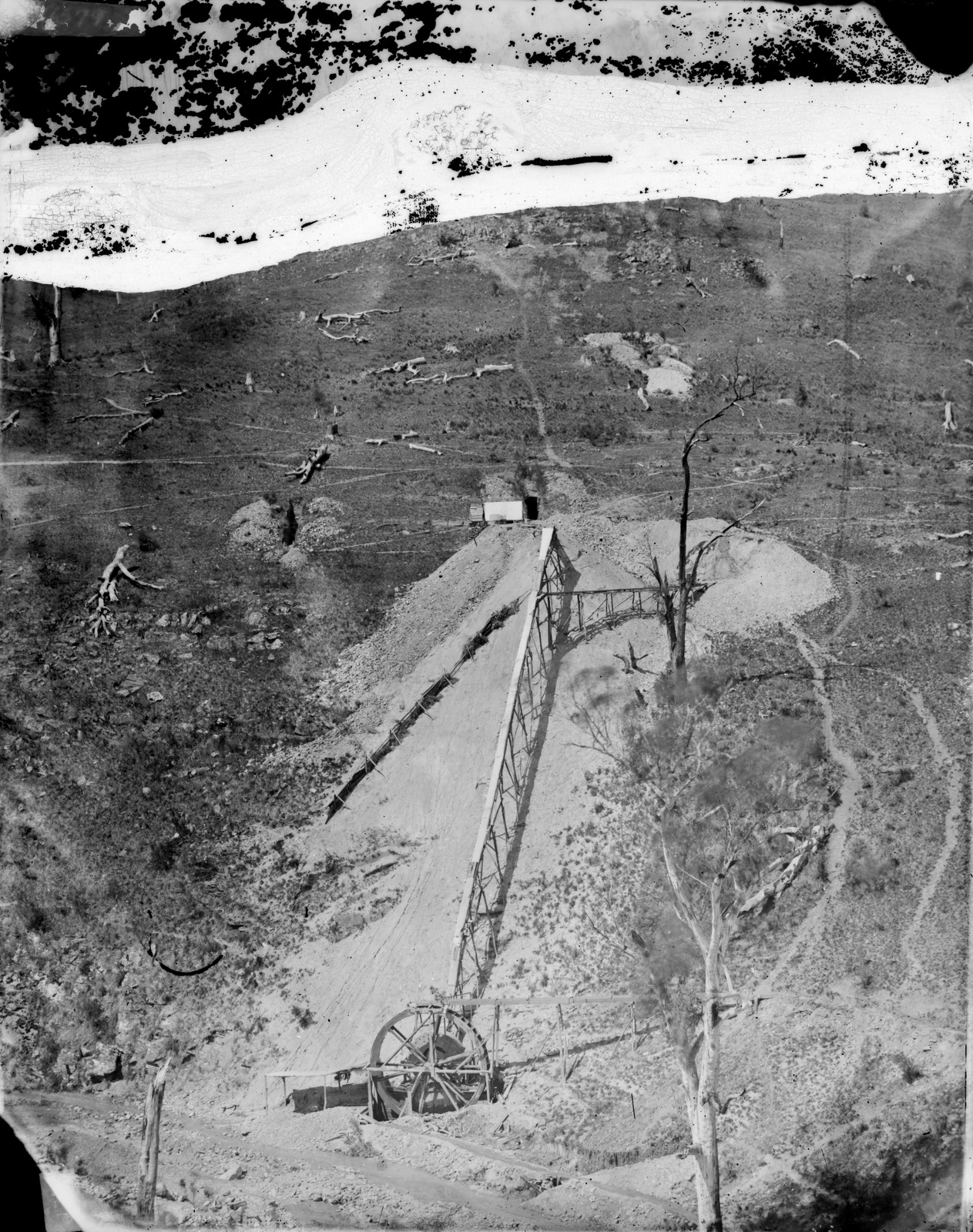
Daintree, Richard, (1858) Great Eastern Tunnel, 1500 feet long, Jim Crow diggings, Daylesford

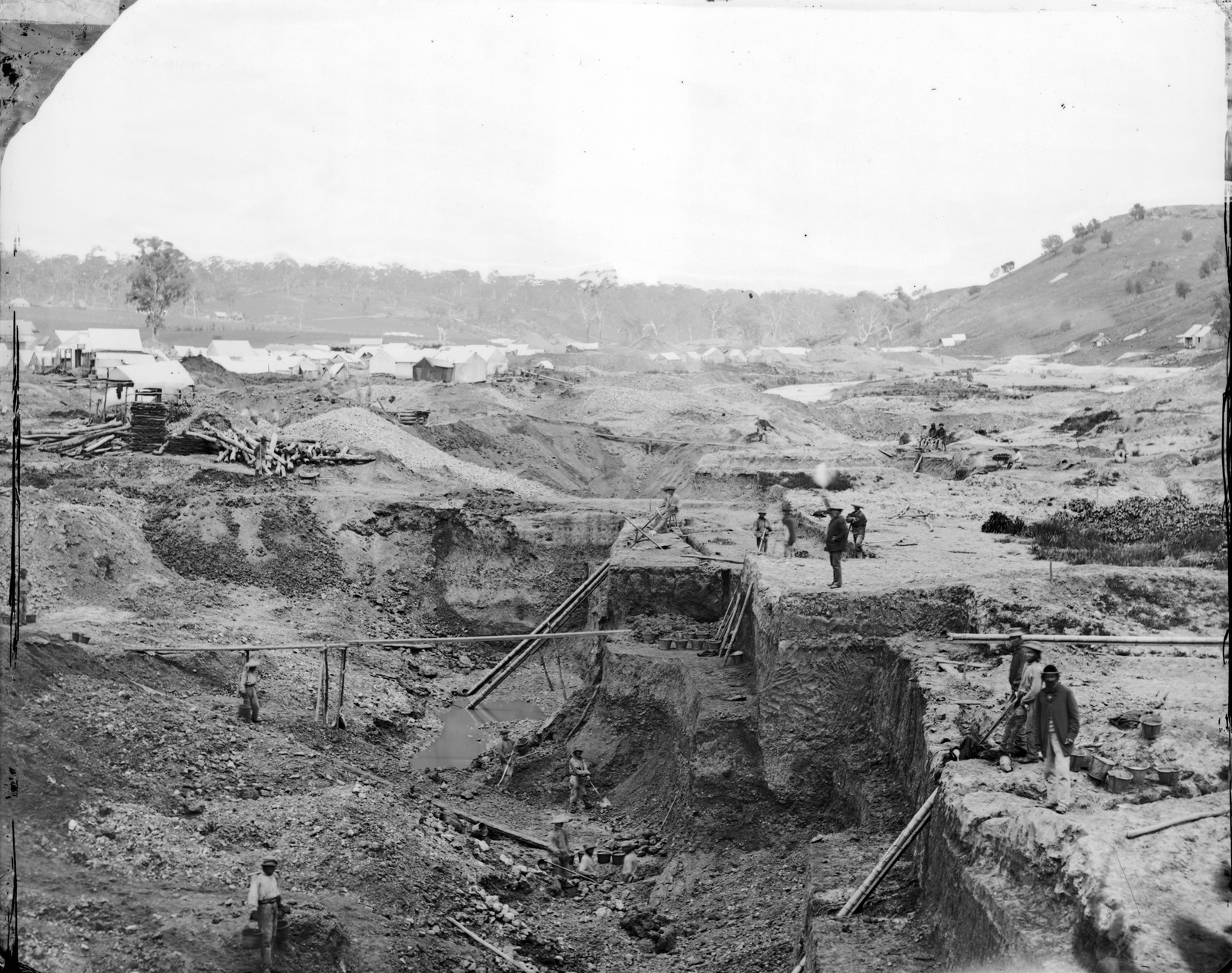
Richard Daintree (c.1858) Chinese gold mining encampment at Guildford

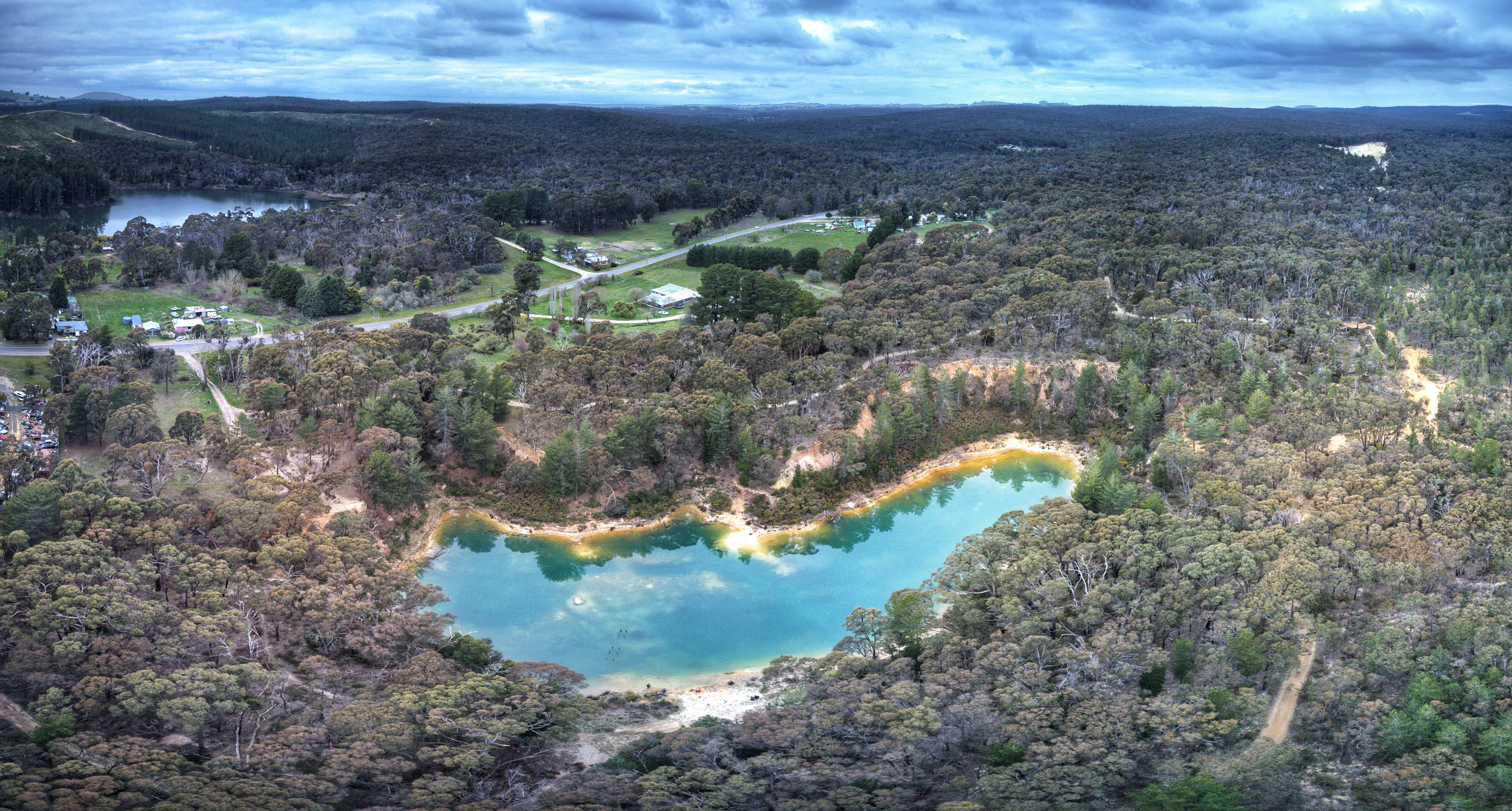
Aerial panorama of Blue Waters lake in Creswick

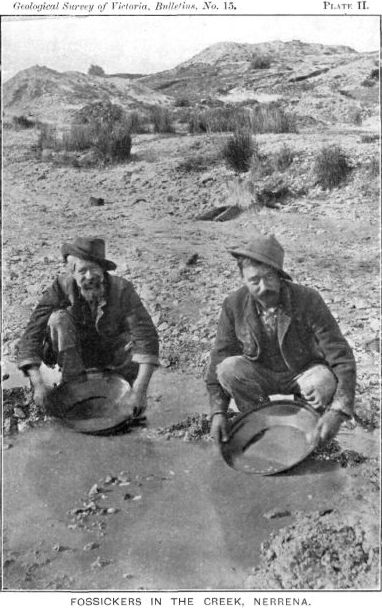
Nerrena fossickers in Nerrena Creek outside Ballarat

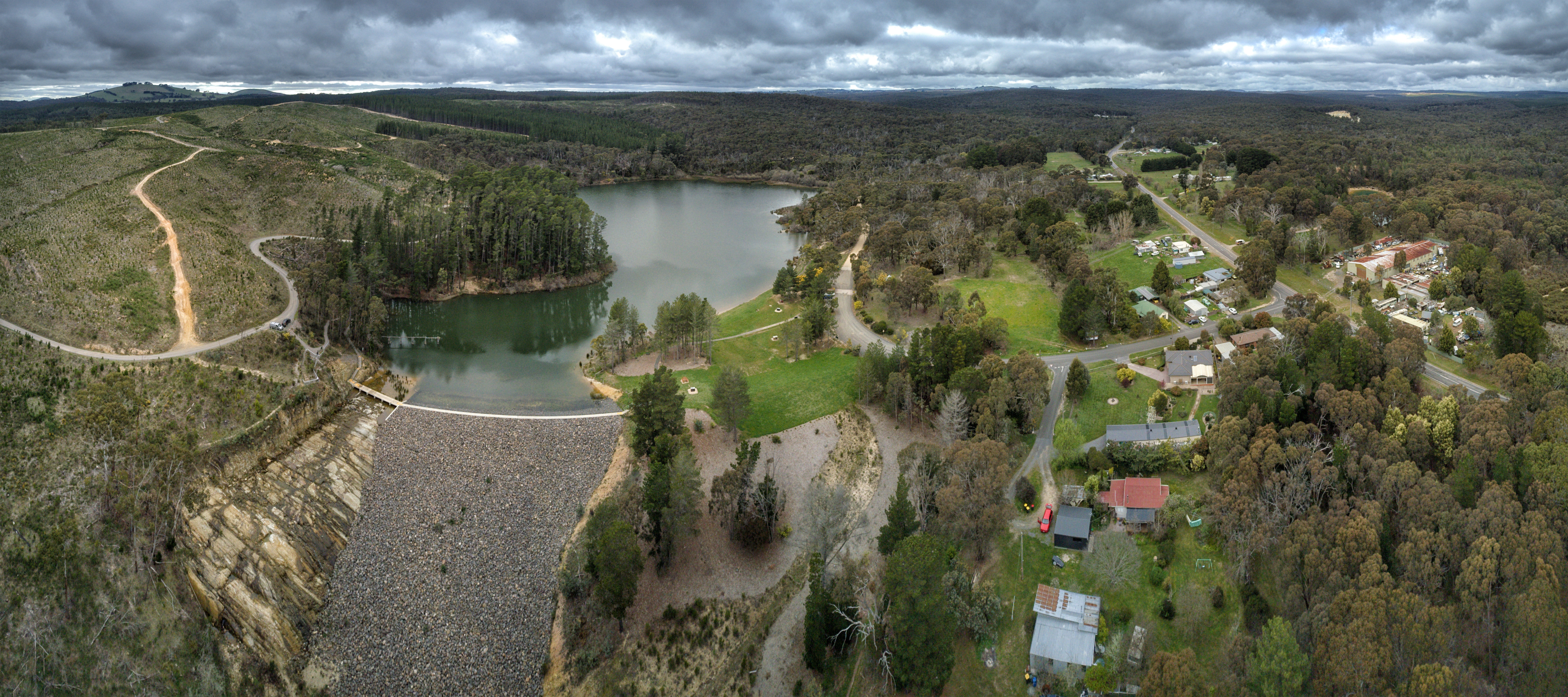
Aerial perspective of St Georges Lake in Creswick. Shot in September 2018

== See also ==
- Jim Crow goldfield
