= Education Act 1872 =

Parliament of Victoria
- Long title: An Act to amend the Law relating to Education.
- Citation: 36 Vict. No. 447
- Royal assent: 17 December 1872

Repealed by
- Education Act 1890
- Status: Repealed

The Education Act 1872 (36 Vict. No. 447) (Vic) was a law which removed state funding of non-government schools, and created a new Education Department to control government schools in what later became the State of Victoria in Australia.

The long title of the act was “An Act to amend the Law relating to Education.”

== Contemporary reporting ==
On 17 December 1872 the act went through the Parliament of Victoria. The Argus reported the next day on the close of the parliamentary session:

"...we must acknowledge that the [parliamentary] session has been by no means a barren one. If the Education Act of 1872 had been the solitary law added to the Statute book during its continuance, that alone would be sufficient to make it memorable in the annals of Victoria.

When we consider the difficulties which attend all attempts to deal with the much vexed question of public instruction, the prejudice be overcome, and the sectarian enmity which has to be encountered, we may well be grateful that the Government measure passed through the ordeal it had to undergo in both Houses without the sacrifice of any of those vital principles it was and is intended to establish.

For the first time in this colony, the young will now have an opportunity of acquiring the rudiments of education unmixed with the leaven of sectarianism, and every child, no matter what its parents' circumstances may be, will receive at the hands of the state that key which, rightly used, unlocks whole stores of knowledge, from whose ample treasures the patient and industrious may freely help themselves. If due effect be given to the compulsory clauses, none will grow up in that gross ignorance which is such a fruitful mother of crime, which fills our gaols, and yearly robs honest industry of a large portion of its reward.

Of course, a great deal will depend on the manner in which the new act is worked; but if care be taken to administer it in the spirit which actuated its framers, we confidently expect to see the most beneficial effects flow from its operation."

== Sources ==
- A Colonial Liberalism: The Lost World of Three Victorian Visionaries, by Stuart Macintyre, Oxford University Press (1991) ISBN 0-19-554760-8
