= Antoine Fauchery =

French adventurer, writer and photographer (1823–1861)

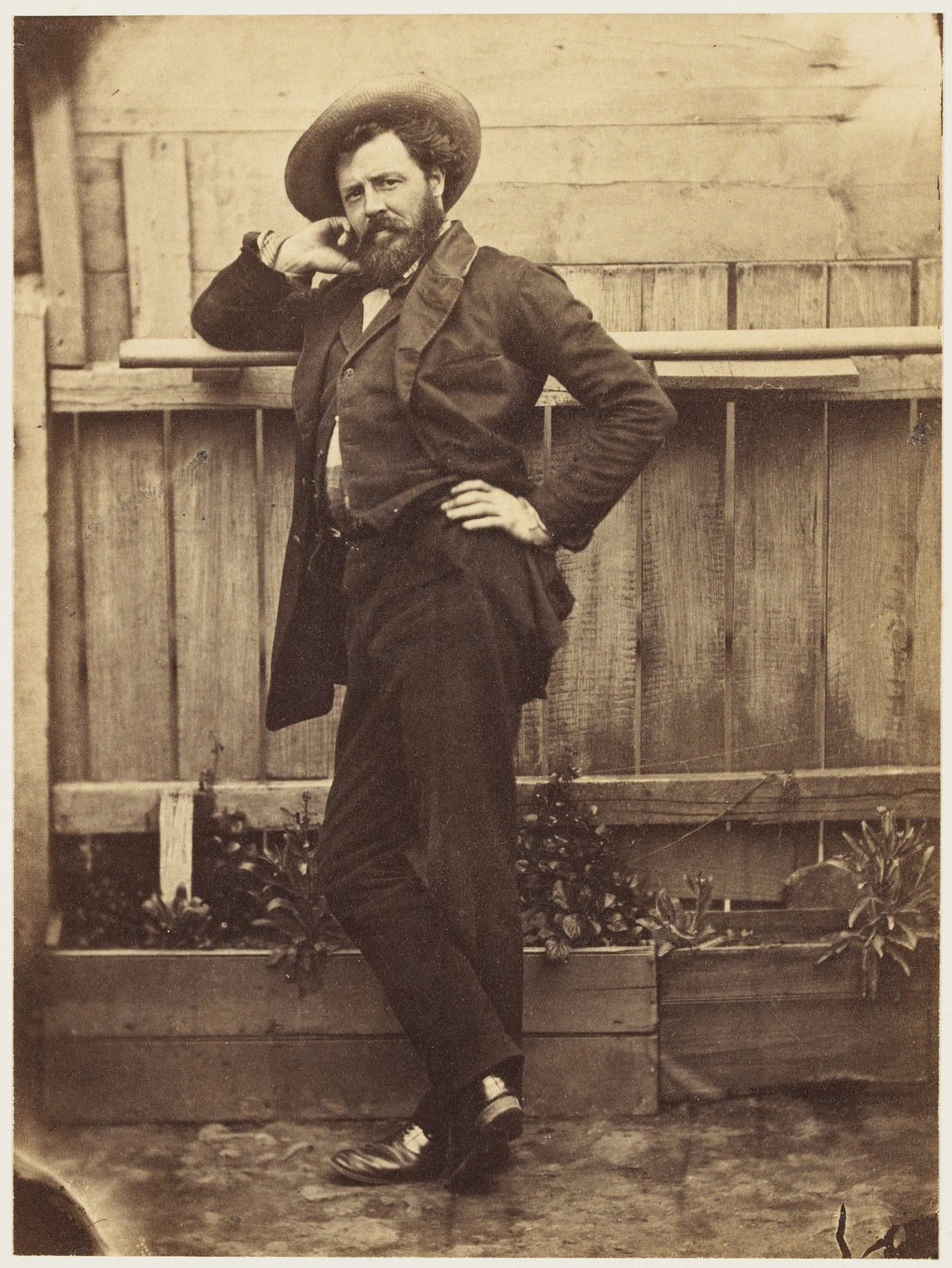
- Fauchery c. 1858
- Born: 15 November 1823; Paris, France
- Died: April 1861 (aged 37–38); Yokohama, Japan
- Occupations: Adventurer, writer, photographer
- Parent(s): Julien Fauchery; Sophie Gilberte Soré

Antoine Julien Nicolas Fauchery (15 November 1823 – 1861) was a French adventurer, writer and photographer with republican sympathies. He participated in the national uprising in Poland in 1848 (Greater Poland Uprising), opened a photographic studio in Melbourne, Australia, in 1858, and was commissioned to accompany the French forces as they progressed to Beijing during the last stage of the Second Opium War in 1860. He wrote thirteen long dispatches from the front-line for le Moniteur, the official French government newspaper. He died in Yokohama of dysentery.

== Early life and interests ==
Antoine Fauchery was born in Paris, France, the son of Julien Fauchery, a merchant, and his wife Sophie Gilberte Soré (other sources have 'Soret'). His parents, who married in 1818, are recorded as having a baby girl, Barbe Julie Sophie, in 1820, three years before Antoine's birth on 15 November 1823. Fauchery's initial interests were in architecture, painting and engraving.

== Writing and adventuring ==
Due to a fortunate meeting in café in 1844 with the poet Théodore de Banville, Fauchery began to develop as a writer. He became part of the Bohemian circle that included writers Henri Murger, Champfleury, Charles Baudelaire, Gérard de Nerval and Théodore Barrière and contributed articles to the journal, Le Corsaire-Satan, along with the rest of that circle. He made portraits of Francoise Guizot, Alexandre Dumas, Jules Janin, Théophile Gautier, Gioachino Rossini, Eugène Scribe, Émile Augier, and Thomas Philippon, François Certain de Canrobert, and the Polish patriot Adam Czartoryski, several of whom were also portrayed by Fauchery's friend, photographer Nadar (Gaspard-Félix Tournachon), with whom in 1848 he journeyed with a group of idealistic French and Polish émigrés who were intent on liberating Poland from Russia. However, Fauchery and Nadar didn't have enough money to support them and went back to France a couple of months after they set out.

Fauchery, according to De Banville, was immortalised in Henri Murger's novel Scènes de la vie de Bohème in the character of the painter Marcel. That portrayal was later to inspire French artist Mirka Mora to migrate to Melbourne. Between 1848 and 1852, Fauchery produced a number of pamphlets, serials and short plays, which were published in journals such as Le Corsaire, Journal pour Rire, Dix Décembre and L'Evénement.

== In Australia and return to Europe ==
In July 1852 Fauchery sailed from Gravesend on the Emily for Australia with Louise, probably Louise Joséphine Gatineau (whom he later married in Montmartre on 15 January 1857), and he spent the better part of the next four years in Australia. Once in Melbourne, he was apparently inspired to go to the goldfields by a Catholic Priest, a fellow Frenchman. Fauchery went to the Ballarat Goldfields, a major destination during the Victorian Gold Rush, where he spent two years digging for gold but had little success himself, although witnessing some successful gold discoveries by others. On his return to Melbourne, he established Café Estaminet Français at 76 Little Bourke Street in Melbourne to serve Europeans in the colony, who could meet and play billiards there. Later in an unsuccessful venture, he kept a provisions store at the Jim Crow gold diggings (Daylesford).

Fauchery returned to UK/Europe in 1856 on the Roxburg Castle, but missed the successful staging of a play he wrote with Théodore Barrière, Calino, charge d'atelier, at the Vaudeville Theatre in Paris. That year La Résurrection de Lazare, a 'drama in letter form' written in collaboration with Henri Murger was published in Paris. His letters, written while a gold miner, were serialised in Le Moniteur Universel, then later published by newly-established Auguste Poulet-Malassis in book form in 1857 as Lettres d'un minuer en Australie and provided an account of day-to-day life and the society of the goldfields.

== Return to Australia ==
Granted 500 Francs by the French government to record Australia, India and China in photographs, Fauchery returned from London to Port Phillip, Australia, by the ship Sydenham with a companion who called herself Julie in late 1857. It was reported in January 1858 that he had brought various examples of photographic portraits of famous people with him on his return to Melbourne and he set up a commercial photography studio at 132 Collins Street, Melbourne. In February of the same year, he won a gold medal for 'various portraits on paper, from collodion negatives' at an exhibition held by the Victorian Industrial Society. As a working photographer, in November 1858 he photographed the Melbourne division of the Volunteer Artillery Regiment and the A and B troops of the mounted force as they went about their artillery practice and manoeuvres in the parkland adjoining the Princes Bridge barracks.

== Sun pictures of Victoria ==
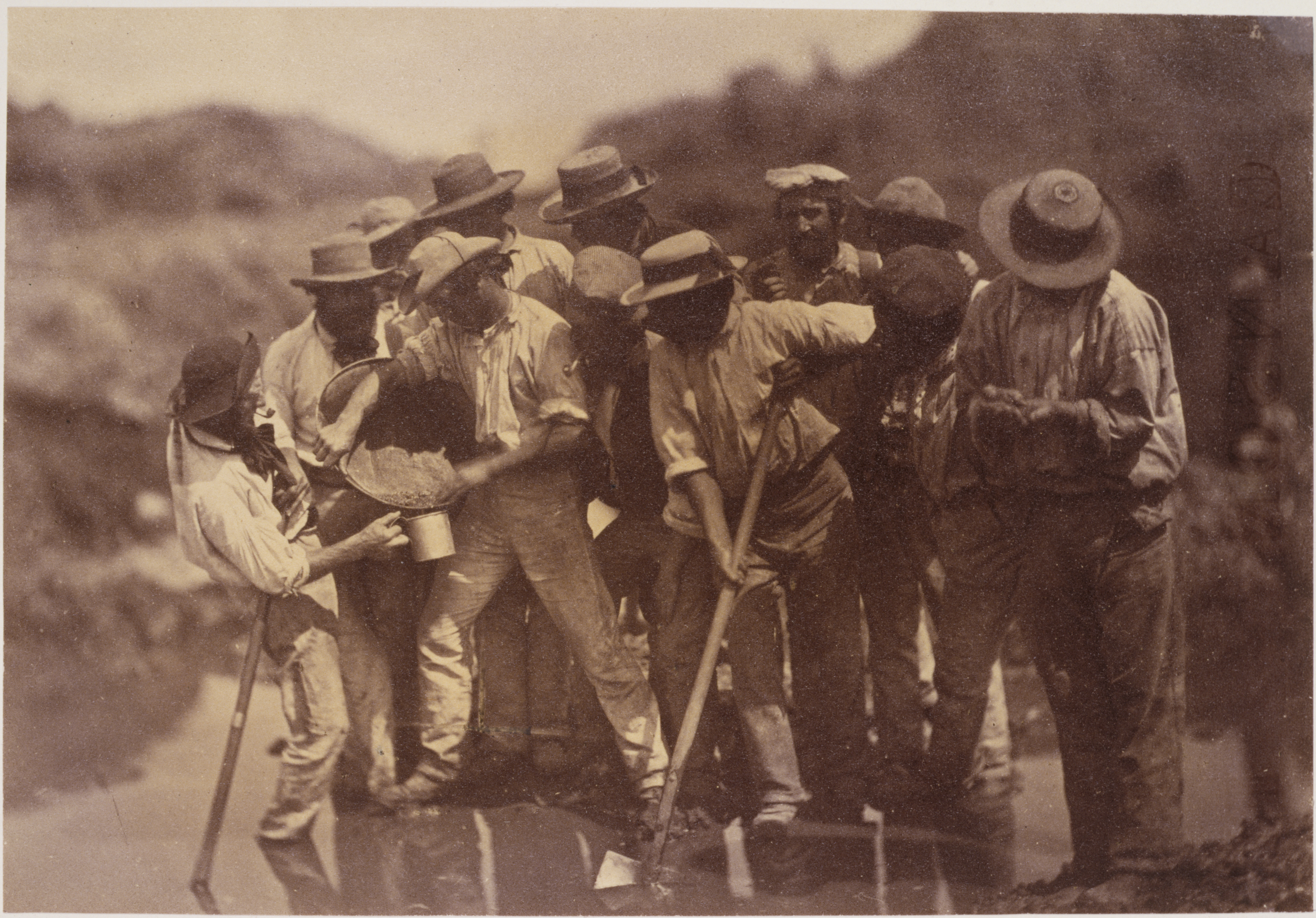
Group of diggers, Castlemaine, from Fauchery and Daintree, Sun pictures of Victoria

The album Sun pictures of Victoria comprised photographic prints of Melbourne, the Victorian goldfields and Aboriginal Australians that Fauchery made with photographer Richard Daintree that are among the only existing images of the goldfields and Australian Aboriginal Peoples from this time. The Argus advertised in 1858 the publication in ten instalments under this title to a total of;

"50 large photographs, in illustration of our colonial celebrities, our landscape and marine scenery, and our private and public architecture. The invention of the stereomonoscope, by means of which the objects exhibited in a sun picture, of any size, assume solidity and relief to the eye of the spectator, gives an additional value to photographic transcripts of nature."

Jack Cato in his The Story of the Camera in Australia in his inspection of a copy of Sun Pictures sold by a relative of John Pascoe Fawkner to the State Library of Victoria, deciphered what was meant by the misleading term 'stereomonoscope;' these were not stereograms but "proved to be taken with a Petvzal lens (designed by Viennese scientist) which gave sharp focus to the subject and a diffused focus to the background from which the subject appeared to stand forward, in relief. This lens had been used only for groups and simple figures. [Fauchery's] city views were sharp all over."

== Final travels and death ==
In February 1859, disillusioned with that city, he left Australia for Manila in 1859, and in 1860 the French government granted him a further 1000 Francs to join a military expedition in China as photographer and war correspondent. From July to November 1860 he was in China and sent regular reports back to France. His Lettres de Chine were serialised in Le Moniteur Universel (October 1860-February 1861). Fauchery became ill while in China and died in Yokohama, Japan, probably of gastritis and dysentery, on 27 April 1861. He was buried in the Yokohama Foreign General Cemetery.

== Selected bibliography ==
Fiction

- Amours d'un Petit Bossu et d'une Magdeleine en Bois
- Une Histoire de l'ami Jacques
- Conte de Jour de l'an

Plays

- Fauchery, A. and Barrière, T. Caline, charge d'atelier [play staged 12 March 1856]
- Fauchery, A. and Murger, H. La Résurrection de Lazare (Paris: Michael Lévy, 1856)

Published letters

- Fauchery, A. Lettres d'un miner en Australie [serialised in Le moniteur universel 9 January-8 February 1857) and published Poulet Malassis et de Broise, Paris, 1857.
- Fauchery, A. Lettres d'Chine [serialised in Le moniteur universel 12 October 1860 – 3 February 1861)

Photographs

- Fauchery, A. and Daintree, R. Australia (1858) (known as 'the Sun Pictures of Victoria') [photographic views and studies]
Photographs by Fauchery and taken with Richard Daintree
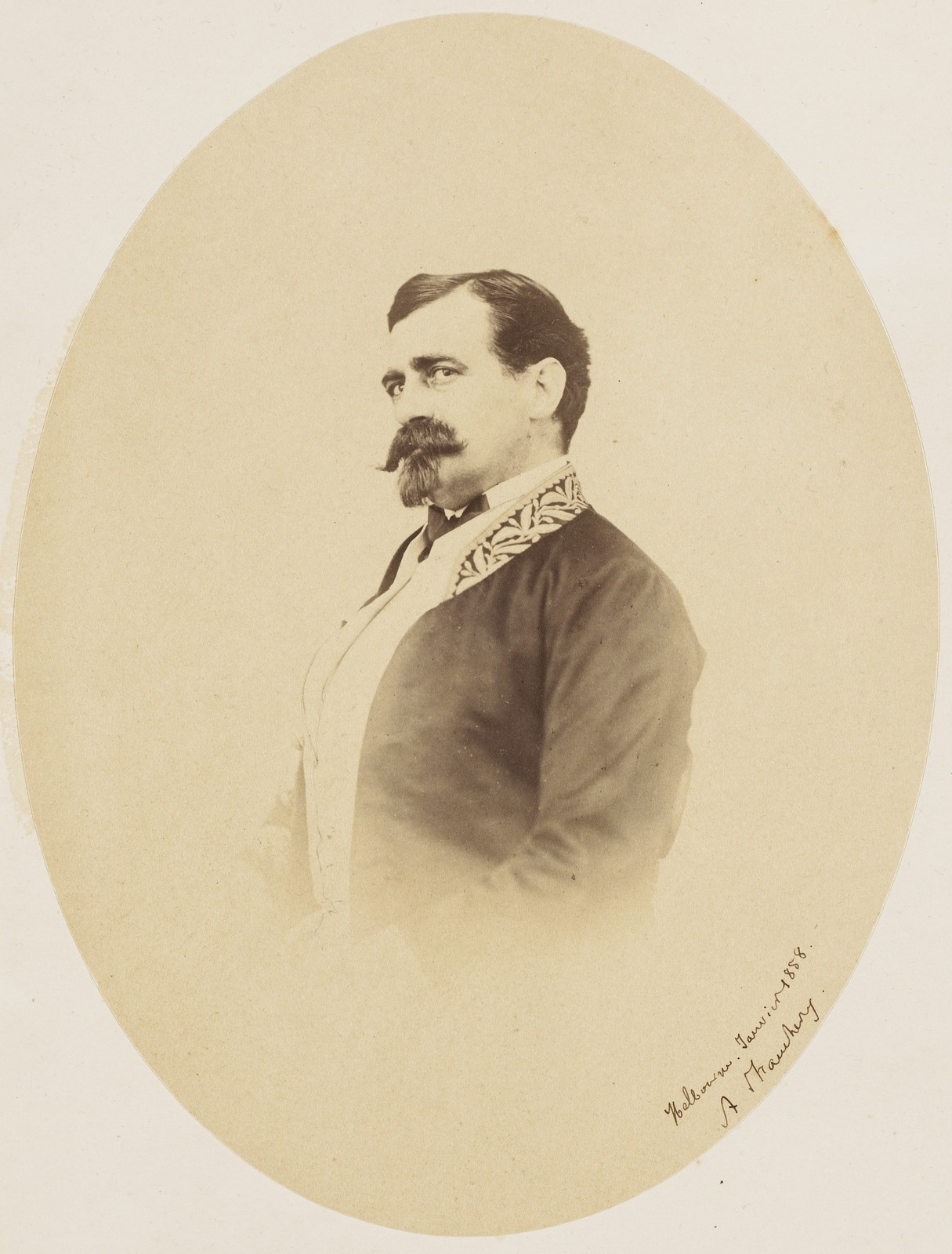
Le Comte Lionel de Chabrillan (1818-1858) consul for France at Melbourne, 1852-1858

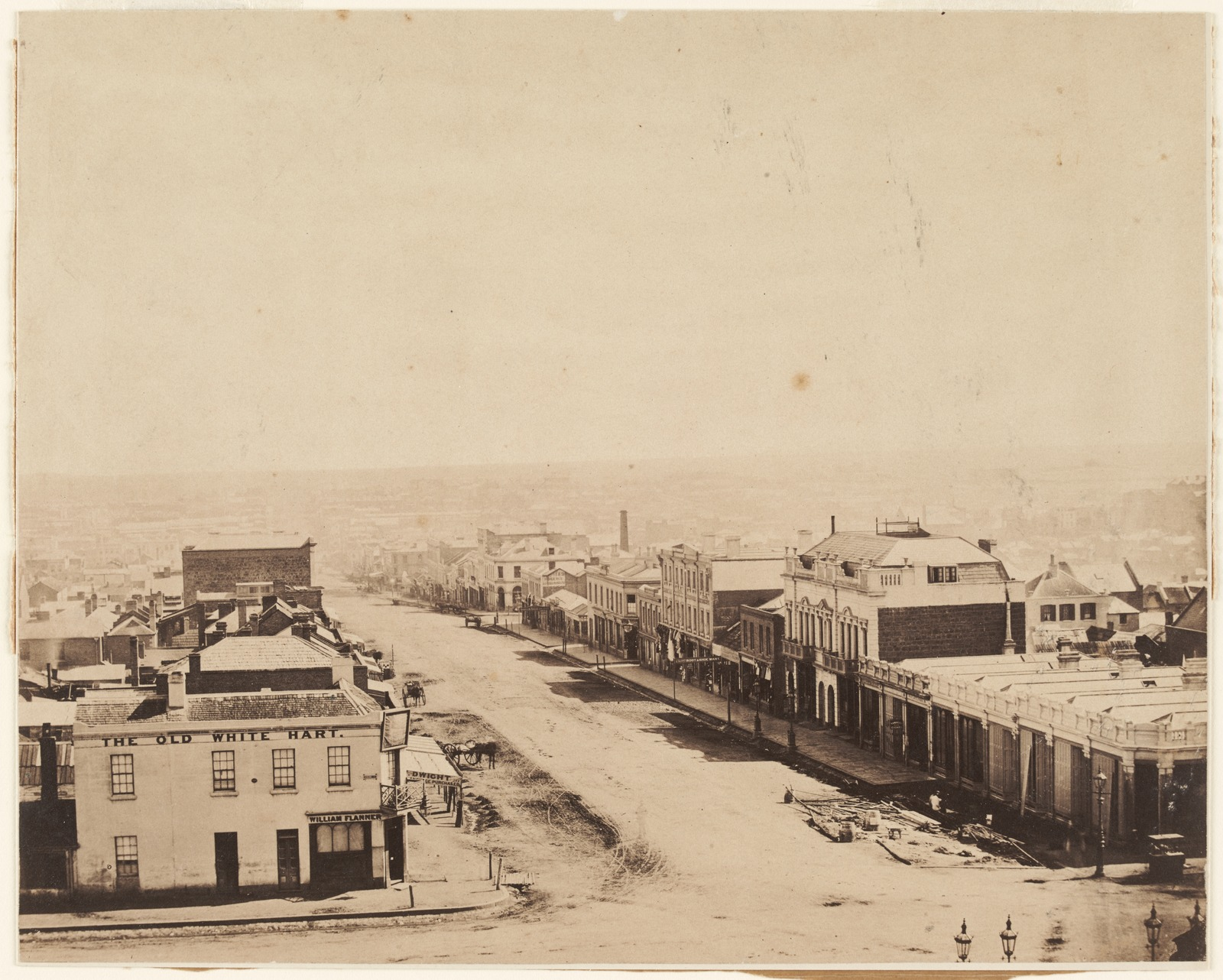
Bourke Street looking west from Spring Street, Melbourne, Victoria

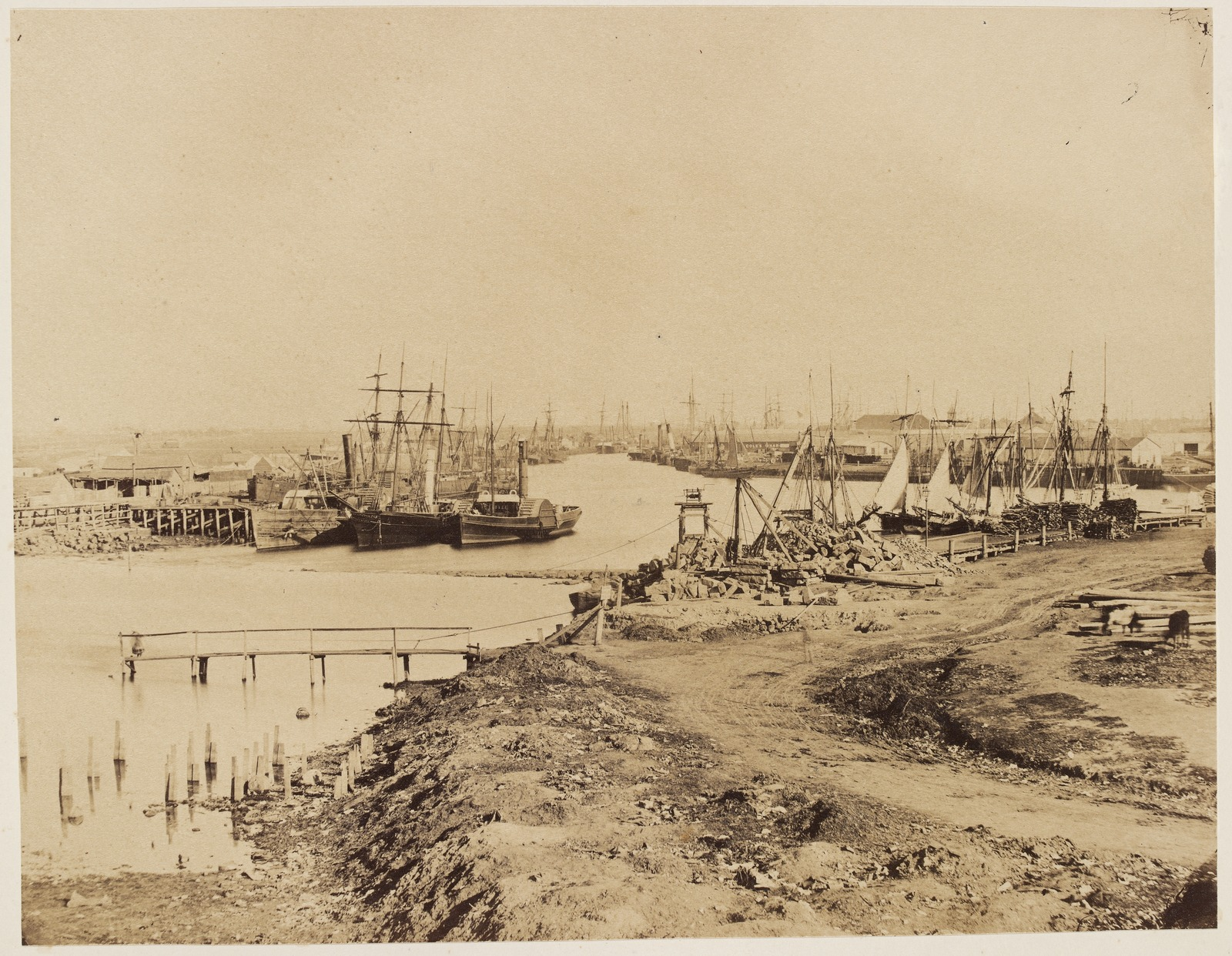
The Yarra below the Falls, Melbourne, Victoria

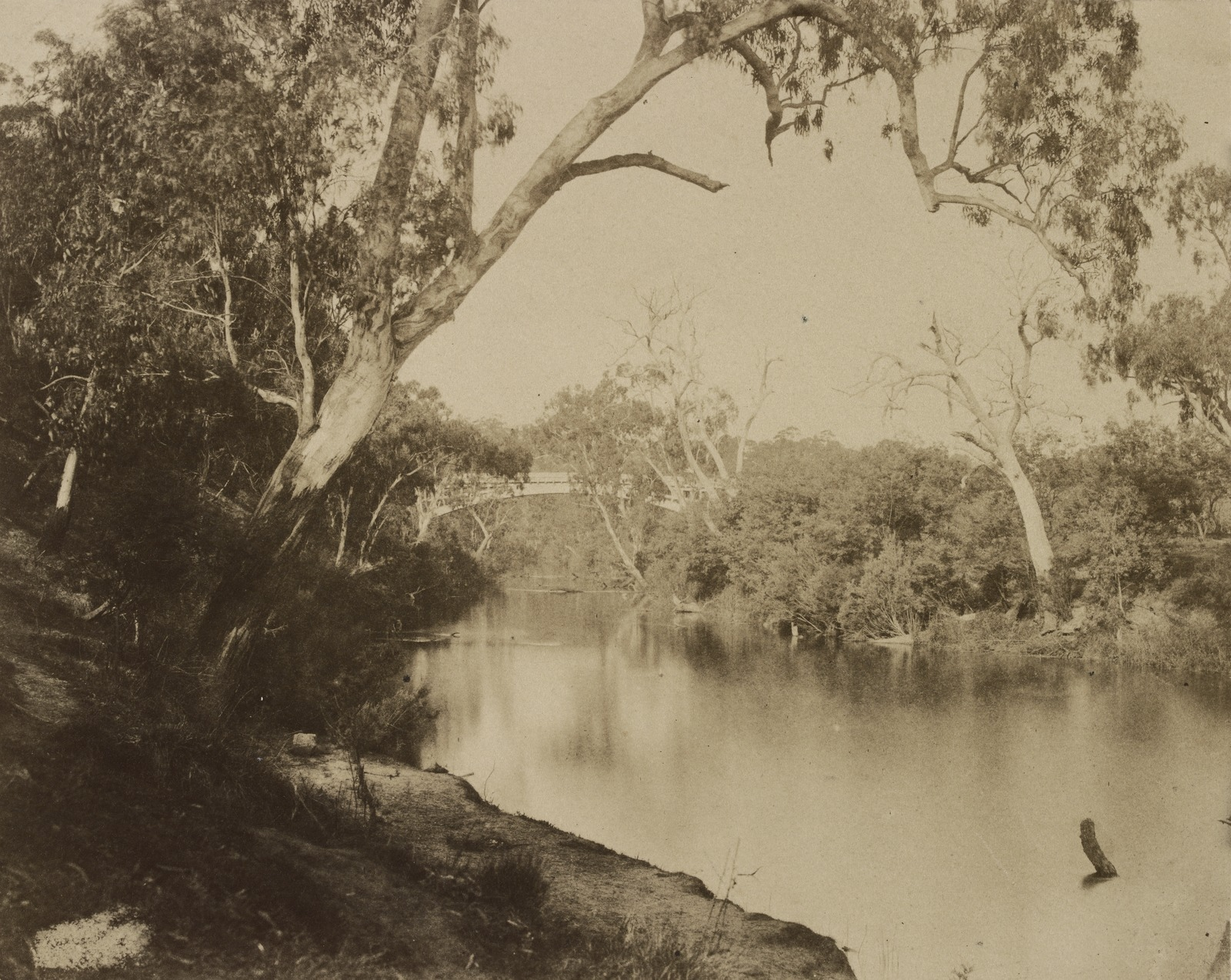
The Yarra near Studley Park, Victoria

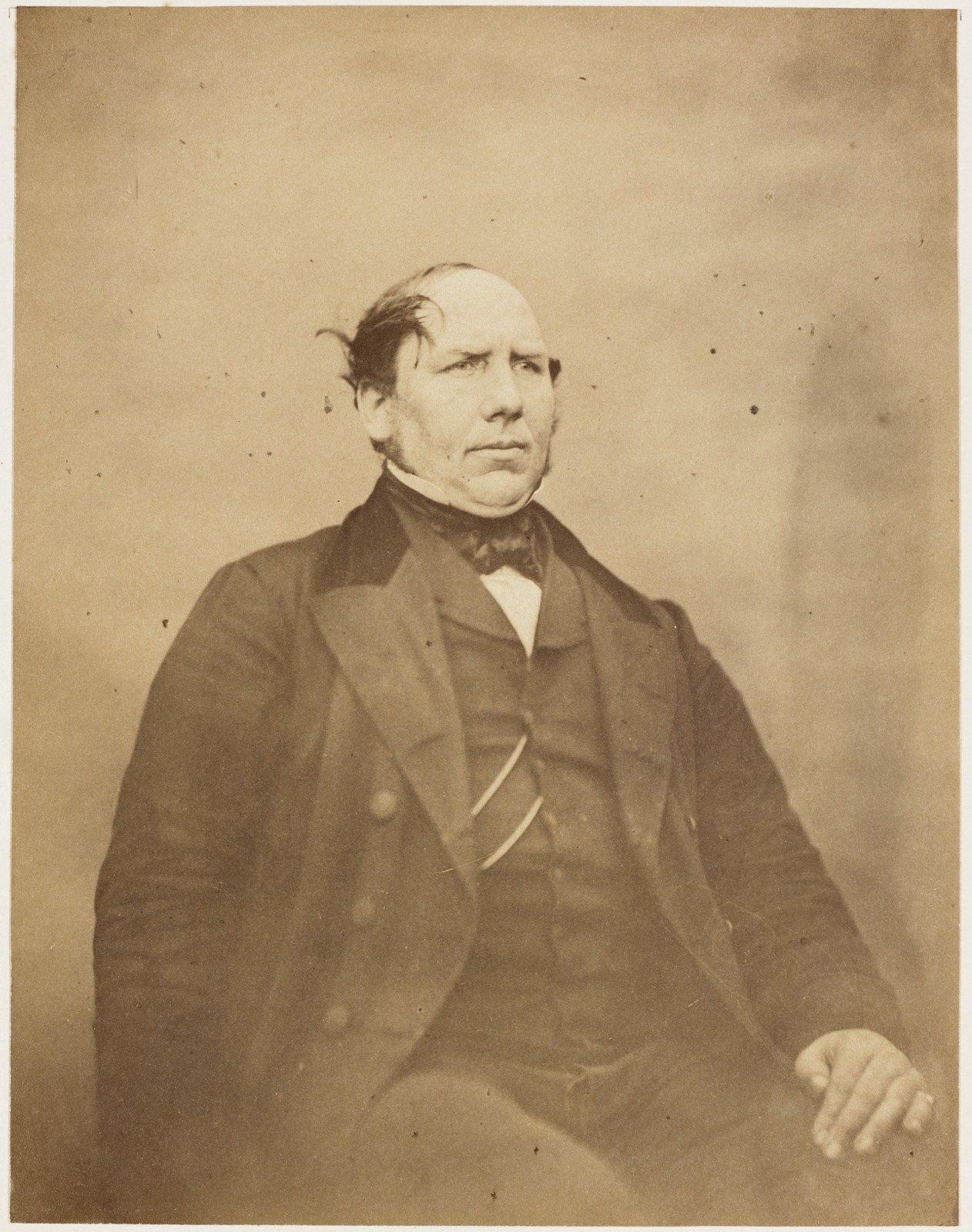
The Honourable J. O'Shanassy Chief Secretary
Images courtesy of , State Library Victoria
