= Richard Daintree =

Australian geologist and photographer

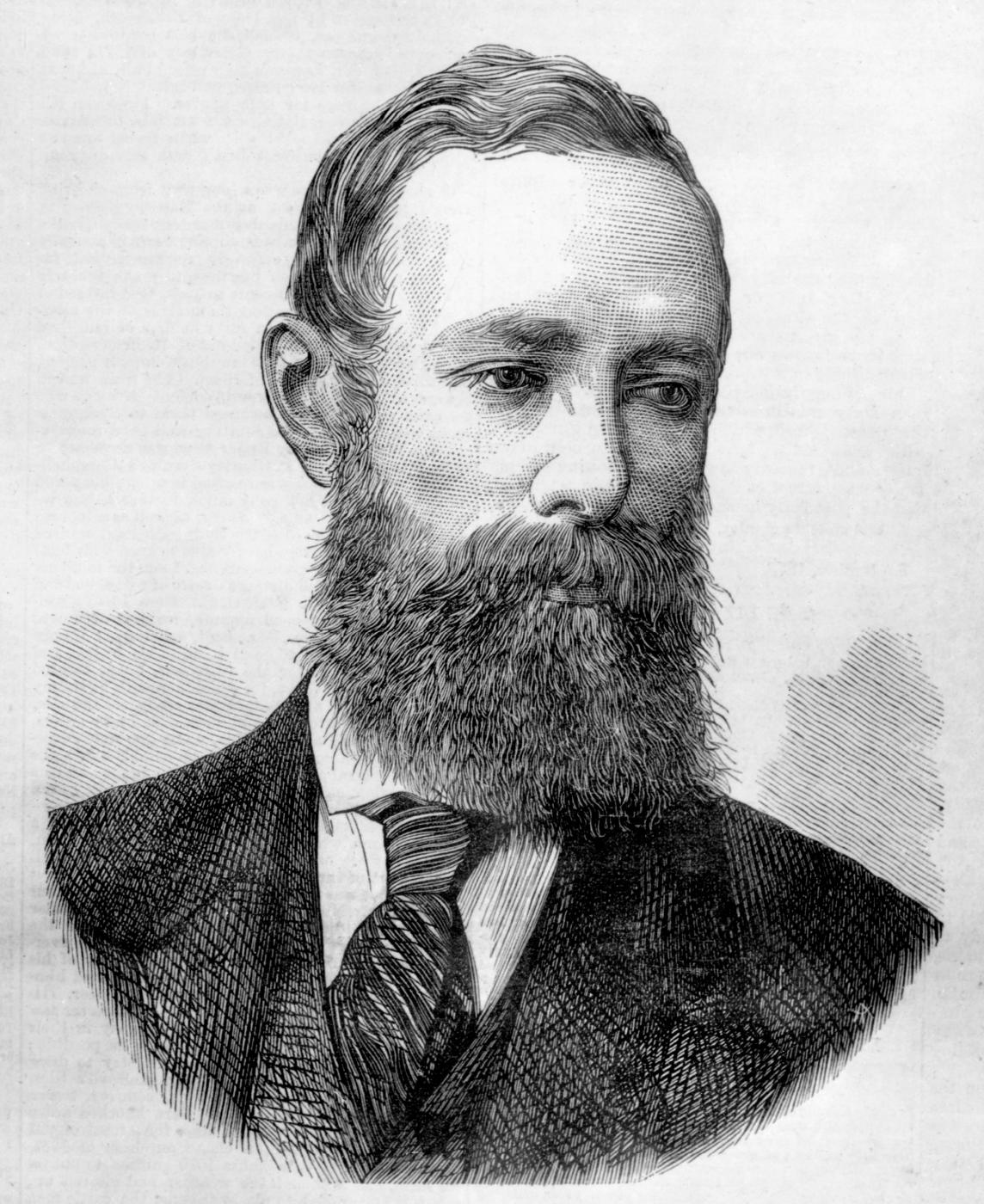
- Richard Daintree, Australian geologist and photographer
- Born: 13 December 1832; Hemingford Abbots, Huntingdonshire, England
- Died: 20 June 1878 (aged 45); Beckenham, England
- Citizenship: United Kingdom
- Education: Christ's College, Cambridge
- Known for: geology, photographs of the Victorian goldfields exhibited at the 1862 International Exhibition in London
- Scientific career
- Workplaces: Australian Geological Survey Office, Queensland Agent-General
- Academic advisors: Alfred Selwyn

Richard Daintree CMG (13 December 1832 – 20 June 1878) was a pioneering Australian geologist and photographer. In particular, Daintree was the first Government geologist for North Queensland discovering gold fields and coal seams for future exploitation. Daintree was a pioneer in the use of photography during field trips and his photographs formed the basis of Queensland's contribution to the Exhibition of Arts and Industry in 1871. Following the success of the display, he was appointed as Queensland's Agent-General in London in 1872 but was forced to resign in 1876 due to ill-health and malpractice by some of his staff although not Daintree himself. A number of features in North Queensland have been named after Daintree including the town of Daintree, Queensland, the Daintree National Park, the Daintree River, the Daintree Rainforest which has been nominated for the World Heritage List and the Daintree Reef.

== Early career to 1864 ==
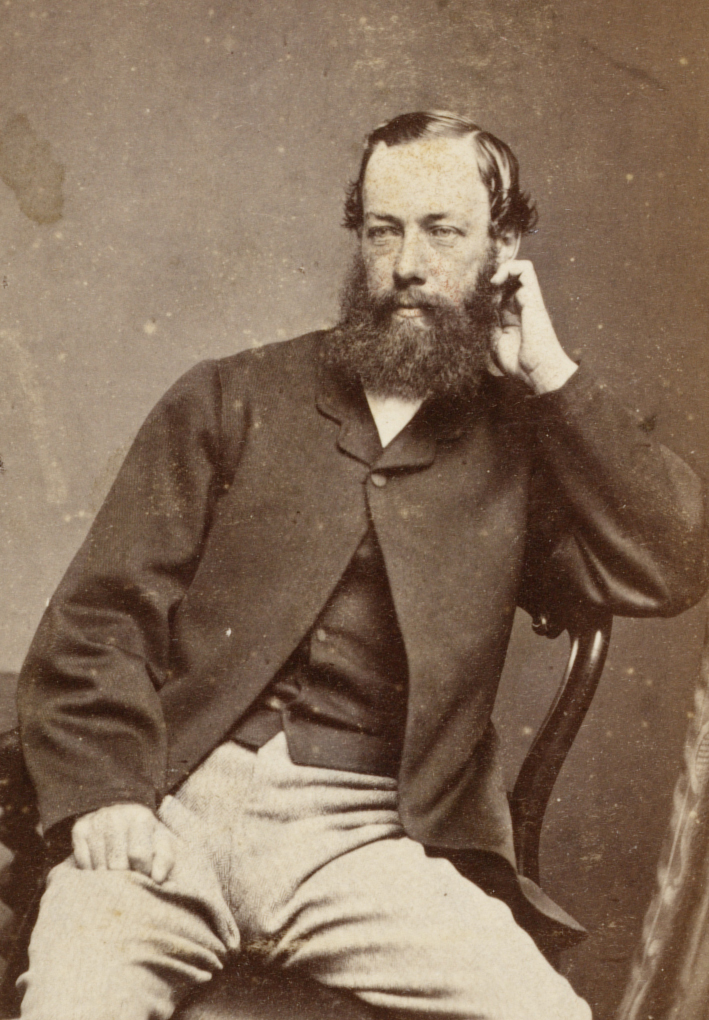
Richard Daintree, circa 1875

Richard Daintree was born in Hemingford Abbots, Huntingdonshire in England, the son of Richard Daintree, a farmer, and his wife Elizabeth. He was educated at Bedford School, and started a degree at Christ's College, Cambridge in 1851, but left after a year due to ill health. Migrating to Australia for a warmer climate, he was briefly a prospector in the Victorian gold rush in 1852.

In 1854, Daintree accepted an appointment as assistant geologist to Alfred Selwyn in the Victorian Geological Survey. Daintree returned to London to study assaying and metallurgy at the Royal School of Mines. During his studies in 1857, Daintree became interested in photography. On return to Australia he joined Antoine Fauchery's studio in Collins Street Melbourne.

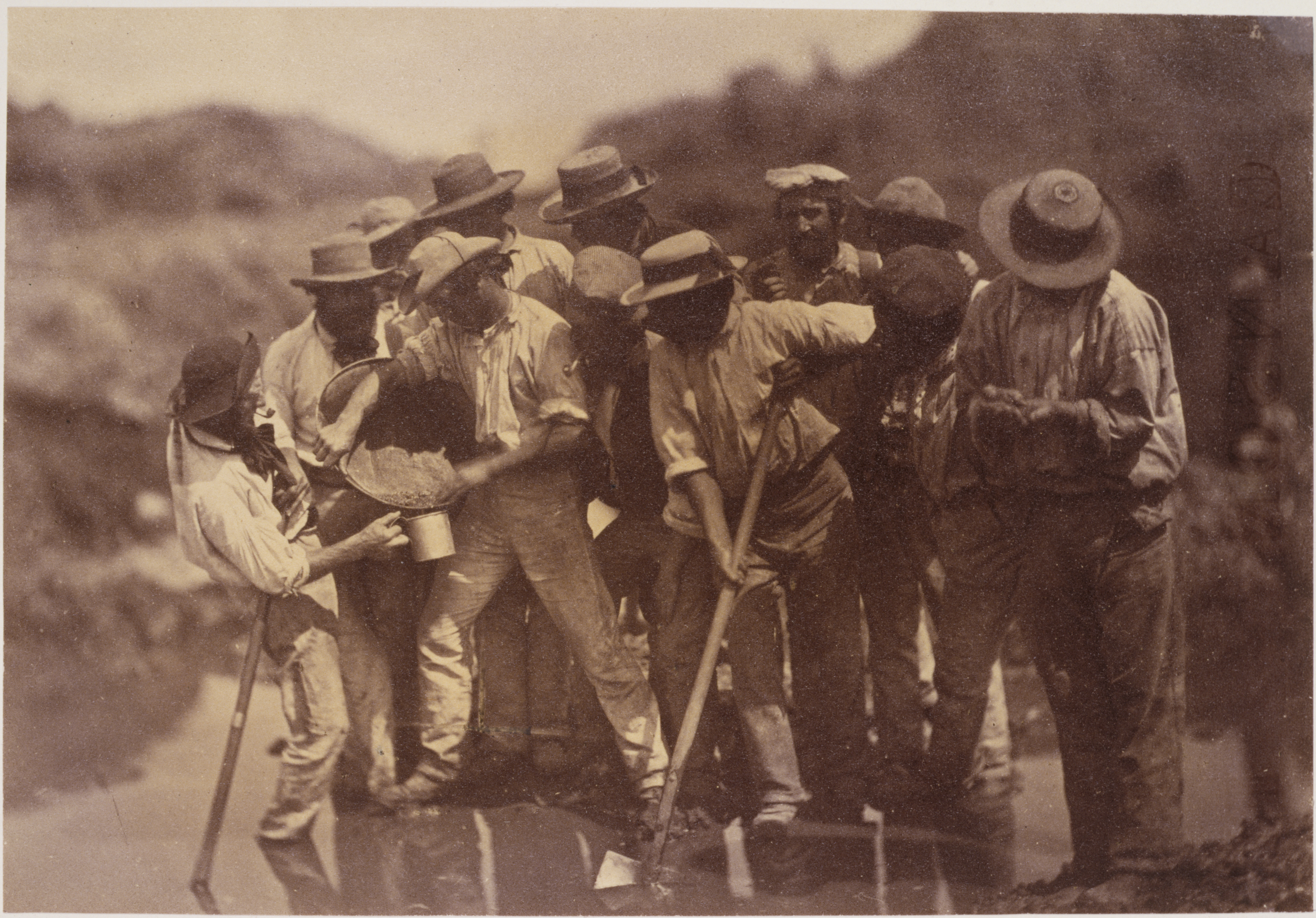
Group of diggers, Castlemaine, from Fauchery and Daintree, Sun pictures of Victoria

Together they produced the album Sun pictures of Victoria which comprised photographic prints of Melbourne as well as some of the only existing images of the Victorian goldfields and Australian Aboriginal Peoples from this time. The Argus advertised in 1858 the publication in ten instalments under this title to a total of;

"50 large photographs, in illustration of our colonial celebrities, our landscape and marine scenery, and our private and public architecture. The invention of the stereomonoscope, by means of which the objects exhibited in a sun picture, of any size, assume solidity and relief to the eye of the spectator, gives an additional value to photographic transcripts of nature."

Jack Cato in his The Story of the Camera in Australia in his inspection of a copy of Sun Pictures sold by a relative of John Pascoe Fawkner to the State Library of Victoria, deciphered what was meant by the misleading term 'stereomonoscope;' these were not stereograms but "proved to be taken with a Petvzal lens (designed by Viennese scientist) which gave sharp focus to the subject and a diffused focus to the background from which the subject appeared to stand forward, in relief. This lens had been used only for groups and simple figures. [Fauchery's] city views were sharp all over."

Daintree rejoined the Geological Survey Office in January 1859 and pioneered the use of photography in geological field work. His photographs of the Victorian goldfields were exhibited at the 1862 International Exhibition in London.

Richard Daintree married Lettice Agnes Foot, the daughter of surveyor Henry Foot on 1 December 1857. They would go on to have a family of two sons and six daughters.

== Queensland work ==
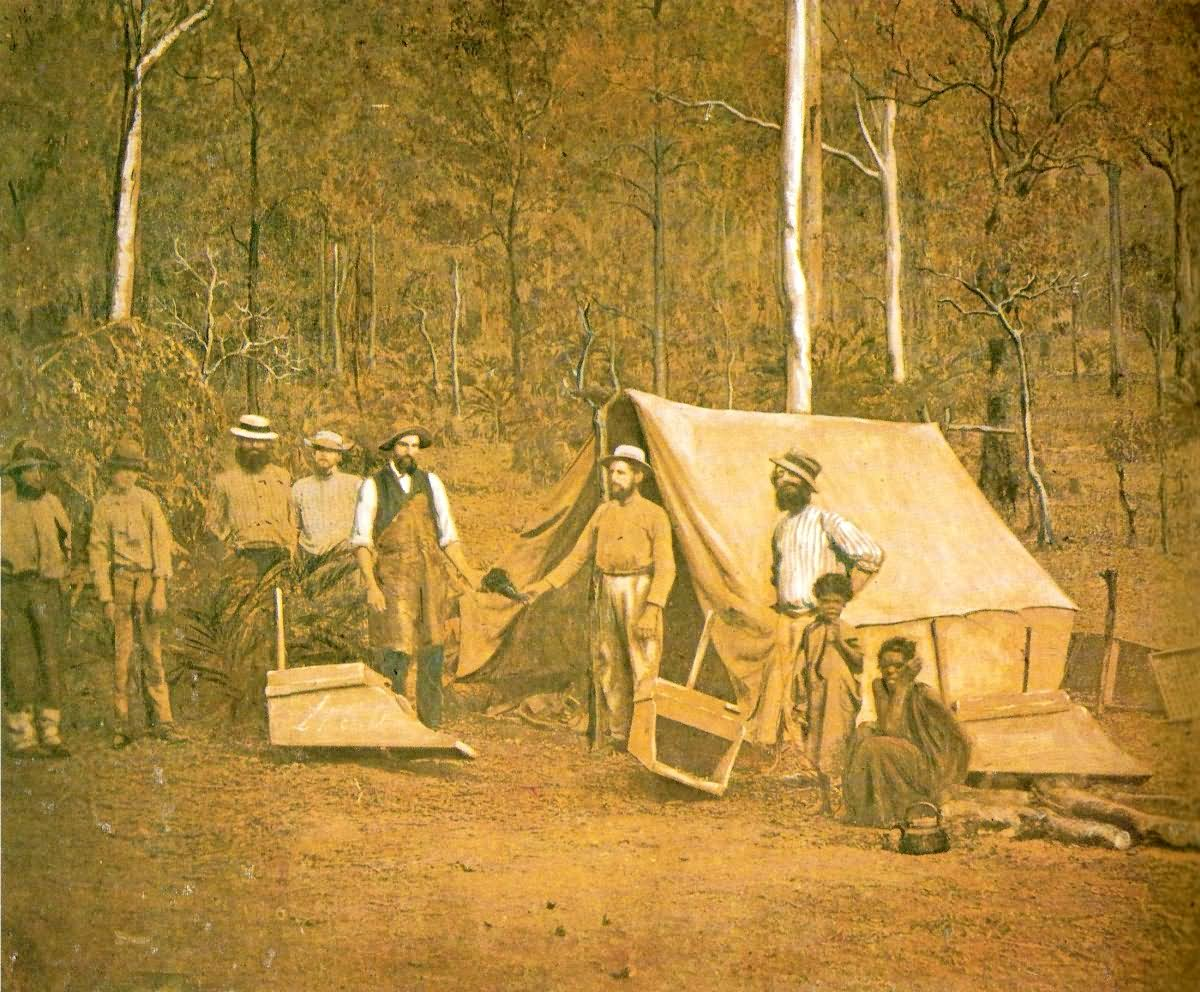
Gold washing cradles for sale, probably near Rockhampton. Photo taken by Richard Daintree.

Daintree left the Geological Survey Office to become a resident partner with William Hann in pastoral properties on the Burdekin River in 1864. This enabled him to pursue his interests in prospecting and photography.

He made a number of discoveries over the next few years including several goldfields at Cape River in 1867, Gilbert in 1869 and Etheridge in 1869–70. Daintree was the first person to systematically examine the coal seams near the Bowen River at Collinsville in Queensland and discovered a copper deposit on the Einasleigh River.

During his time in Queensland, Daintree advocated a government geological survey office and his lobbying bore fruit when it was established in 1868. He was named as the geologist in charge of north Queensland between 1868 and 1870. During that time, he carried out a geological survey of North Queensland and his photographs of the Cape River goldfields are a valuable record of life on the Queensland goldfields. He was succeeded as government geologist by Robert Logan Jack.

Richard Daintree was also collecting botanical specimens in his travels. Queensland herbarium records show that he collected botanical specimens from Rockhampton, Queensland and the ranges of Central Queensland. These included Acacia excelsa Benth. which was once named Acacia daintreeana by Ferdinand von Mueller.

The goldfields discovered by Daintree played an important part in tiding North Queensland over the collapse of the pastoral boom in the late 1860s although only the Etheridge deposit proved viable in the longer term. However, his work proved crucial to attracting prospectors to North Queensland which led to other discoveries and the early development of the area's gold resources.

== Return to England ==
Richard Daintree was appointed as commissioner in charge of Queensland's display at the 1871 Exhibition of Art and Industry in London. His collections of photographs and geological specimens formed the basis of Queensland's stand at the Exhibition despite the fact that much of his work was lost when the ship carrying Daintree, his family and the display was wrecked in South Africa.

Despite this significant setback, the display made a favourable impression due to his photographs. The Australian colonies were all keen to make a good impression as the Exhibitions were well attended by both potential investors and prospective migrants. Daintree soon established himself as an effective representative of Queensland at the Exhibition.

The success of the display led to Richard Daintree being appointed as Queensland's Agent-General in early 1872 replacing Archibald Archer in that position. In this position, Daintree was asked to organise participation in another six exhibitions. As Agent-General, Daintree worked with great energy stimulating assisted immigration to Queensland, travelling widely to give speeches on the colony and producing attractive handbooks featuring his photography.

However, Queensland premier Arthur Macalister was disturbed about the quality of some of the new immigrants and evidence of inefficiency and possibly worse in the office. Eventually, Macalister's concerns prompted him to travel to London personally in 1875–76 to investigate the office. Daintree was found to be personally honest and hardworking, and he was made a Companion of the Order of St Michael and St George in May 1876. However, the clerks responsible for routine administration were found to have conducted various malpractices, leading to their dismissal. Daintree's health had deteriorated as well contributing to his resignation from the position.

He spent two winters in the south of France trying to recover from his illnesses. However, he died of tuberculosis in Beckenham then in Kent on 20 June 1878. He was buried in Lolworth, Cambridgeshire, close to his parents' home at Lolworth Grange.

Daintree's photographs are one of few surviving records of early settler life in north Queensland. Ten glass plates are now in the collection of the National Museum of Australia in Canberra.

It is likely that the ten glass plates in the National Museum's collection were part of Daintree's efforts to promote Queensland. Their subject matter, mainly that of miners and their living and working conditions, suggest that they may have been used to illustrate the lectures that Daintree gave across Britain to attract immigrants. The bulk of Daintree's glass plates remained in the collection of the Daintree family in England until the 1940s when most of the negatives were donated to the Royal Historical Society of Queensland, though the ten plates remained in the Daintree family collection until they were auctioned in 1982. The successful bidders at that auction then sold the plates to the National Museum in 2007.

== List of works ==
- Daintree, R. (1863). Report on the geology of the district from Bacchus Marsh to Bass's straits / by R. Daintree. Melbourne: John Ferres, Govt. Print.
- Daintree, R. (1873). Queensland, Australia : Its territory, climate and products, agricultural, pastoral and mineral &c., &c. with emigration regulations / Richard Daintree. London]: G. Street.
- Daintree, R. (1878). Note on certain modes of occurrence of gold in Australia / by Richard Daintree. S.l.: Geological Society.
- Daintree, R., Carruthers, W., & Etheridge, R. (1872). Notes on the geology of the colony of Queensland / by R. Daintree; with an appendix containing descriptions of the fossils, by R. Etheridge and W. Carruthers. London: Geological Society.
