= Lerderderg Gorge =

- Location of the Lerderderg Gorge in Victoria

Location
- Country: Australia
- State: Victoria
- Region: Victorian Midlands (IBRA), Western District
- Local government area: Moorabool
- Town: Bacchus Marsh

The Lerderderg Gorge is in Victoria, Australia and largely within the Lerderderg State Park. The Lerderderg River which emerges from the Great Dividing Range has cut a deep gorge as it winds toward the southern plains. It is suggested that the name Lerderderg is perhaps a corruption of the Wurundjeri word "Larderdark," from "larh", meaning "stone house", and "dark", meaning "peppermint gum".

== Location ==
37°37′35″S 144°25′44″E to 37°23′42″S 144°19′06″E

Gorge of Lerderderg River extending from Nolan Gully south to the Lerderderg ford.

== History ==
The Marpeang balug clan of the Wadawurrung nation are the original inhabitants of the Gorge and its surrounds until European settlers arrived on their lands in the early 1830s.

== Description ==
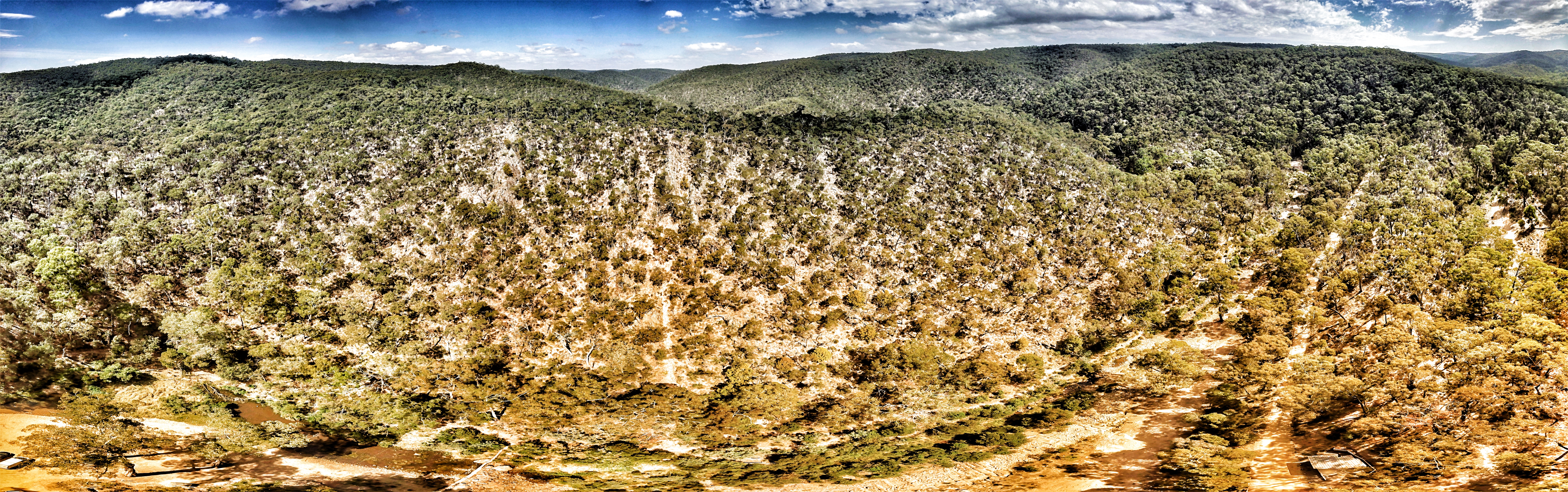
Aerial perspective of O'Brien's Crossing in Lerderderg State Park, Victoria. March 2018

Lerderderg State Park and the surrounding Wombat State Forest are north of Bacchus Marsh, around one hour's drive (90 km or 56 mi) from Melbourne on the Western Highway. Its myriad tracks, gullies, creeks, and ridges form a wild, rugged environment enjoyed by bushwalkers, horse riders, and mountain bikers.

The striking feature of this area is the 300-metre-deep (980 ft) gorge that stretches south to the plains of Bacchus Marsh.

Parts of the Wombat State Forest are still actively logged, and some areas are designated for domestic firewood collection with a permit. Many roads in the Lerderderg State Park are closed between June and the beginning of November as the park is within a water catchment area.

== Bushwalking ==
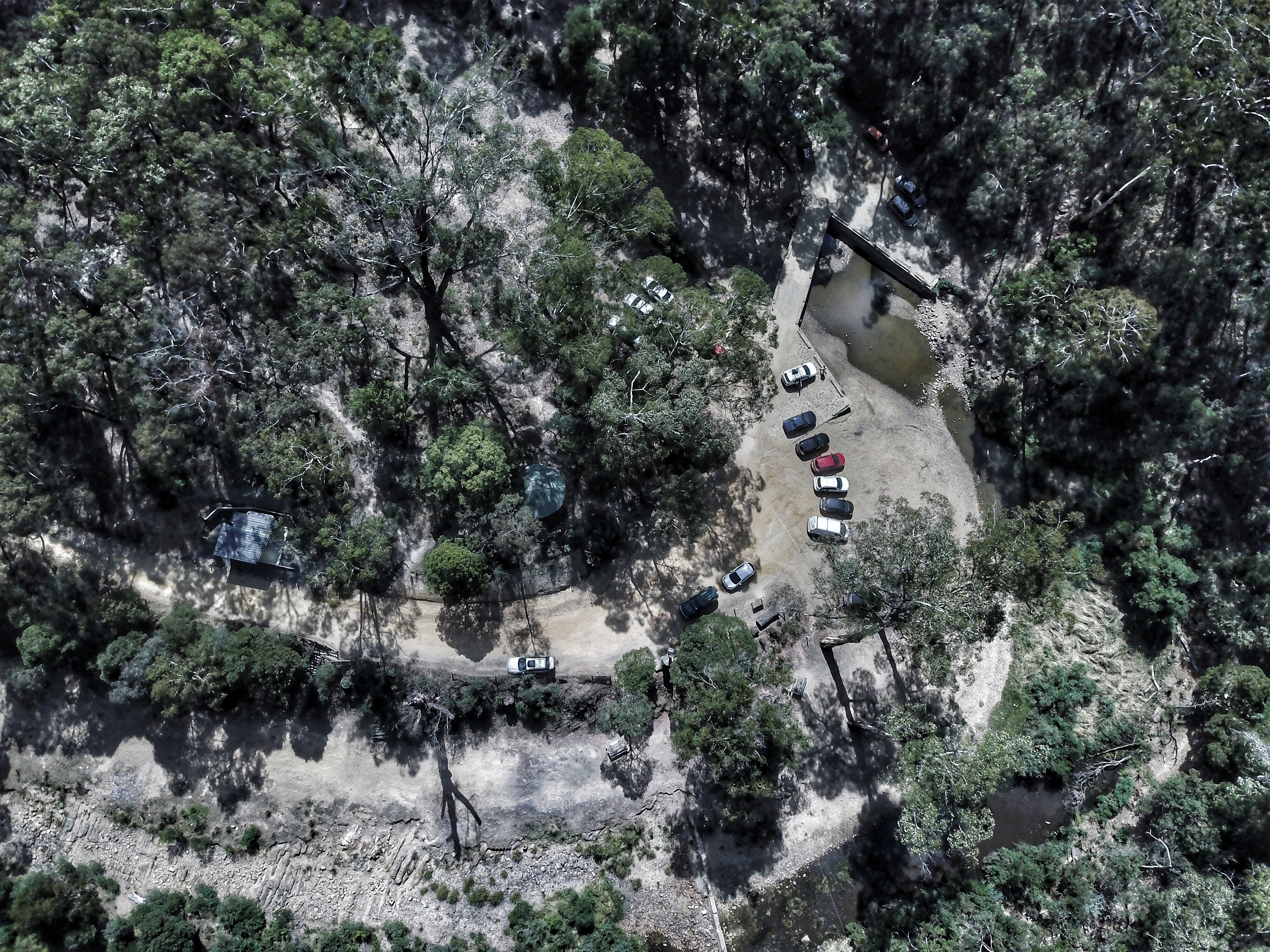
Aerial perspective of O'Brien's Crossing in Lerderderg State Park

The park has been popular for bushwalking since the 1880s. It covers such an area that it is still possible to walk all day and not see anybody. The most popular areas to start a walk are from Mackenzies Flat Picnic Area and O'Briens Crossing. One walk from Mackenzies Flat goes up one side of the gorge to the up to the Lerderderg Weir and back along the other side. From O'Briens Crossing one can walk either up or down the river. Walking up takes one to The Tunnel. Walking can be more difficult after heavy rain, and if walking along the river it is advisable to walk downstream, as the bushes on the riverbed bend that way.

== Access ==
From the East via Bacchus Marsh-Gisborne Road and Lerderderg Gorge Road for Mackenzie's Flat picnic area, from the south-west via Myrniong and Mt Blackwood, from the northwest via Greendale-Trentham Road and O'Brien's Road for O'Brien's Crossing; often flooded, in drought years it is safe to use.

== Management ==
Within the Lerderderg State Park and managed by Parks Victoria.

== Geology ==
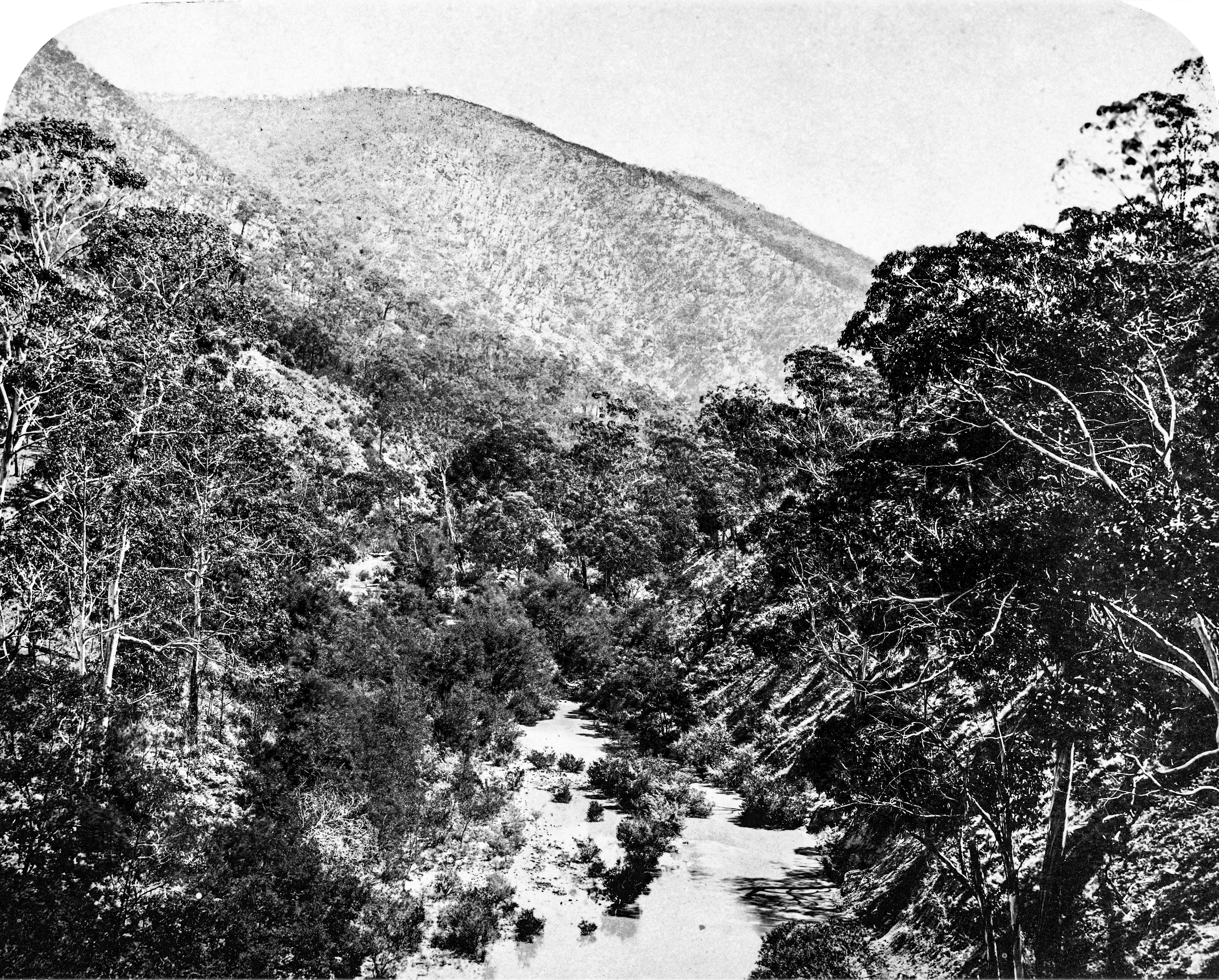
Richard Daintree (c.1859) Gorge of the Lerderderg looking towards Mount Blackwood, Vic.

The Lerderderg Gorge is cut by the Lerderderg River into the blocks of the Rowsley, Greendale and Coimadai Faults. Side slopes are commonly of 350–400 metres (1,150–1,310 ft) with some vertical rocky cliffs up to 60 metres (200 ft) high. The topography of the area is dominated by long, narrow ridges and steep secondary spurs, with a high degree of rock outcrop on ridge crests, slopes, and stream channels. Lower Ordovician sandstones and mudstones intruded by numerous small quartz veins form the dominant geology. The river descends steeply through boulders along a convoluted course with several steep-sided gooseneck meanders.

In a 1994 assessment of soil erosion in the shire of Bacchus Marsh, Spinoso and Rollings used the Universal Soil Loss Equation to confirm identification in 1973 and 1985 by the Land Conservation Council of Victoria of "an appreciable erosion hazard on steep slopes increas[ing] in intensity in the low rainfall areas in the south east. Particularly high hazards exist in the Lerderderg Gorge...associated with steep slopes and erodible soils."

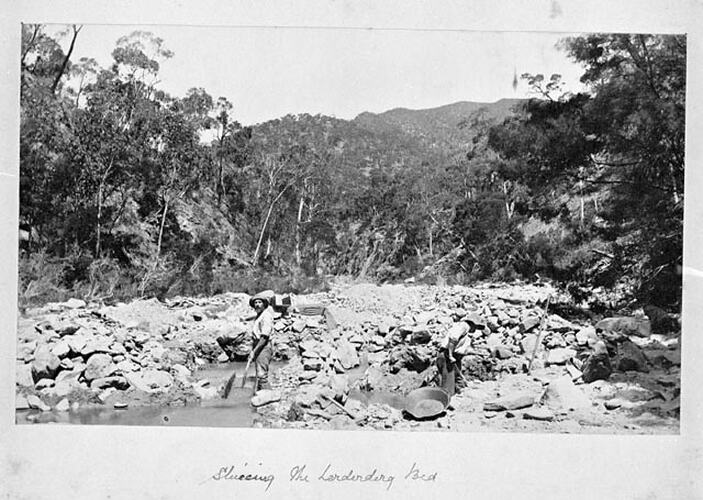
A. J. Campbell (c1890) Sluicing in the Lerderderg Gorge

Gold is reputed to have been found in the Lerderderg River early in 1851 and was mined in November and December that year near Blackwood. In his 1869 report Smythe noted the Blackwood goldfields "on the upper tributaries of the River Lerderderg which have cut deeply into the schists, exposing in some places high cliffs," and quoted from contemporary Mining Surveyors' Reports that; "The formation of the Blackwood goldfield is peculiarly favorable for allnvial miners with limited capital, inasmuch as there is no deep sinking required, nor machinery for lifting water, as there is ample fall for drainage in every part; that, in fact, the only outlay necessary is for sluicing-boxes and mining tools. Thus equipped, a party with small capital, and a fair share of skill, patience, and perseverance, may realize a competency in a few years." In 1855 the Geelong Rush began when 300 diggers arrived, soon joined by 2000 to work the alluvial deposits of the Lerderderg River known as Adelaide Flat, Nuggetty Gully, Ballan Flat, Frenchman's Gully, Long Gully and Yankee Gully. By September around 13,000 diggers and associated trades were on the goldfield. Gold mining continued, conducted by individuals and small companies who panned the creek, dug shafts and diverted the waters to wash gold took place in the Lerderderg Gorge. Their most notable engineering was the diversion of the Lerderderg River at Tunnel Bend, cut 25 m through solid rock, in order to extract alluvial gold in the large meander of the original river bed. Chinese miners reworked ground others had left and cleaned the river to bedrock. Remains of water races, stone walls and mining spoils can also still be seen.

== Vegetation ==
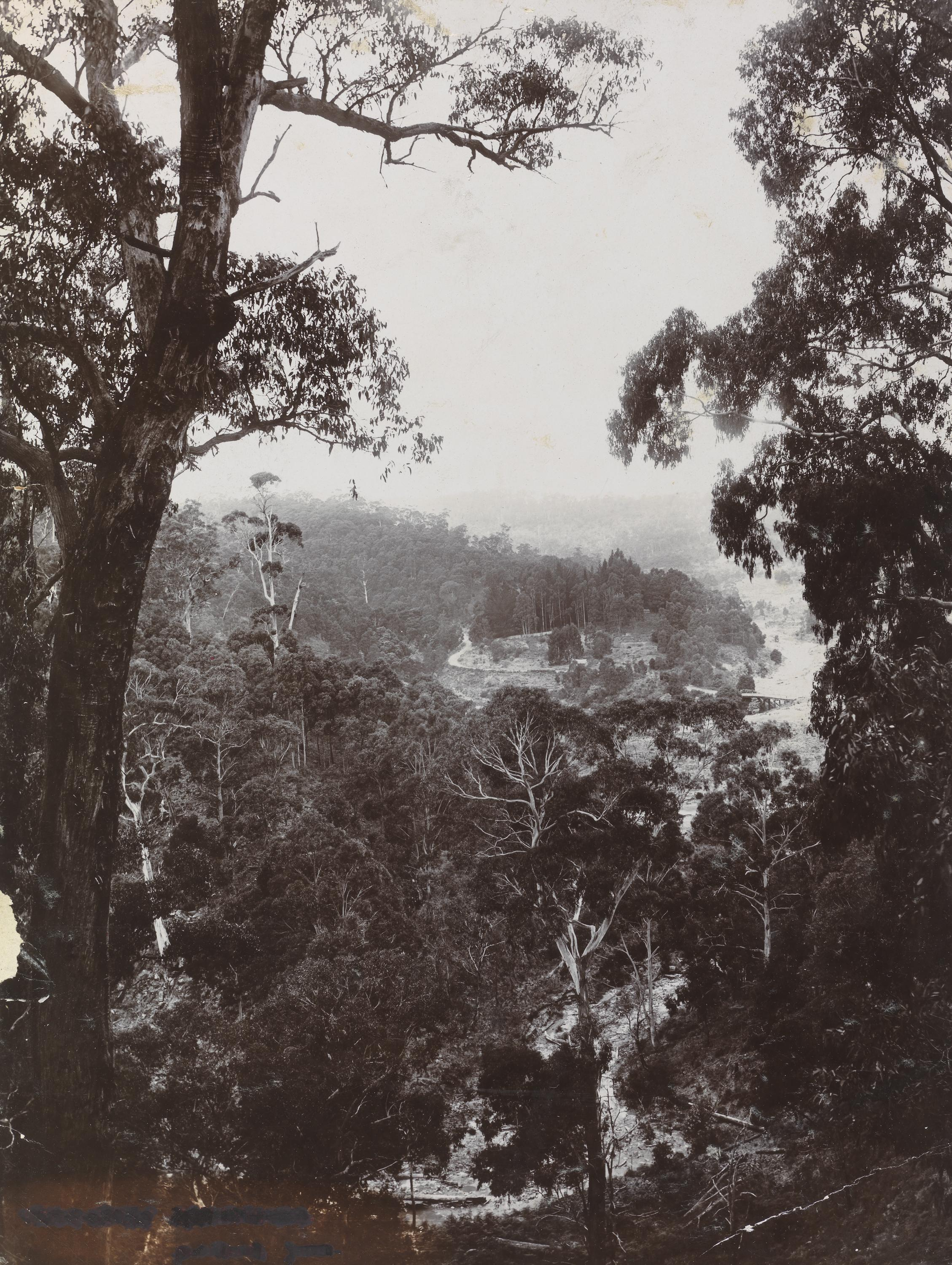
Nicholas Caire (c.1890) Long Gully. Head of the Lerderderg Gorge at Blackwood

The vegetation of the Gorge follows the pattern of increasing rainfall from south to north, with the dry eucalypt forests of stringybark and box near the mouth of the gorge, and box-ironbark along ridges, progressing to taller Eucalyptus globulus, to the damper messmate (Eucalyptus obliqua) and peppermint gum (Eucalyptus radiata and Eucalyptus dives) forests at the north. By the riverbank are Eucalyptus ignorabilis and manna gums, while the understorey Gahnia microstachya, Lepidosperma tortuosum and Persoonia juniperina are uncommon elsewhere in western Victoria, and a range of grevilleas, wattles and hakeas cover the gully steeps and sometimes impede passage along the river banks and bed.

== Fauna ==
Eastern grey kangaroos, swamp wallabies, and echidnas are also about during the day, and occasionally koalas are seen in the manna gums. Platypus may be present but are rarely sighted. The greater glider, mountain brushtail possum, bent-wing bat, and powerful owl are active at night.

Tiger, red-bellied black, and brown snakes may be encountered, but more common are skinks, and the fast-moving jacky dragons (Amphibolurus muricatus) and mountain dragons (Rankinia diemensis).

Fish species include the tiny mountain galaxias, river blackfish, whose scarcity was noted as early as 1906, and estuary perch that all survive regular droughts and low summer flows in waterholes. Introduced European perch and common carp are well established. The Gorge and the nearby Brisbane Ranges are the most westerly range of the Rocky River frog.

Birdwatching is a rewarding activity; between 1893 and 1899 the Brittlebank brothers observed birds west of Melbourne, recording many from the Lerderderg Gorge, their greatest contribution to local ornithological knowledge being a paper on the birds of Myniong published in The Victorian Naturalist which listed every bird species which Charles and Thomas had recorded in the district, 158 species in total, including birds now declining, threatened or rare; the gang-gang cockatoo, regent honeyeater, and letter-winged kite; and other birds found in the Gorge including the white-naped honeyeater, white-throated treecreeper, crimson rosella, square-tailed kite, rainbow lorikeet, spangled drongo, cicadabird, hooded robin, black-faced monarch, white-browed and grey-crowned babbler, and dollarbird. Frequently seen are the sulphur-crested cockatoo, which nests in the gorge and feeds in surrounding grasslands. Wedge-tailed eagles inhabit tall trees in the steep gulleys.

== Significance ==
The Lerderderg Gorge is one of the major river valleys of Victoria.

== See also ==
- Lerderderg River
- Lerderderg State Park
- Lerderderg River diversion tunnel
