= Darley, Victoria =

Darley
- Suburb
- Interactive map of Darley
- Coordinates: 37°39′17″S 144°26′14″E
- Country: Australia
- State: Victoria
- City: Bacchus Marsh
- LGA: Shire of Moorabool
- Location: 49 km (30 mi) NW of Melbourne

Government
  - State electorate: Melton
  - Federal division: Hawke

Population
  - Total: 9,190 (2021 census)
- Postcode: 3340
Suburbs around Darley
Myrniong	Lerderderg	Coimadai
Myrniong; Pentland Hills	Darley	Merrimu
Pentland Hills	Bacchus Marsh	Bacchus Marsh

Darley is a suburb of Bacchus Marsh, Victoria, Australia located directly north of the central area across the Western Freeway. It is the most populous locality and earliest settlement (1838) in Bacchus Marsh. At the 2021 census, Darley had a population of 9,190.

It is bordered by the Lerderderg River to the east, Korkuperrimui Creek to the west, Western Freeway to the south and Lerderderg State Park to the north. Darley is located on the rural-urban fringe, the topography varies but is mostly undulating.

It began as a small agricultural settlement on the bend of the Lerderderg River in 1838 and was surveyed and proclaimed a town in 1861.

In recent decades Darley has rapidly grown and has become a major suburban area of Bacchus Marsh with a large number of housing estates and developments to the east south and north capitalising on Darley's proximity to the freeway.

The suburb is home to Darley Primary School, Pentland Hills Primary School, large sports oval (Darley Oval) home to the Darley Football Club and Darley Cricket Club, the Bacchus Marsh Golf club, IGA supermarket and small commercial centre on Albert Street.

Darley is also home to "Triassic park" (The Council Trench), The Council Trench is geologically significant to Victoria. It is the only known outcrop of Triassic aged sedimentary rock in the state. The Council Trench is exposed as outcrop in a trench, about 40m in length and 2 to 5 m depth, cut into a low ridge, on the east side of Tramway Lane, Darley.

A former Military camp "Camp Darley" was housed in the Darley area, accommodating US service personnel from many units including, 49th Fighter group, 5th Airforce, 808 Engineer Aviation battalion and 182nd Infantry regiment of task force 6814.

== See also ==
- Darley Football Club

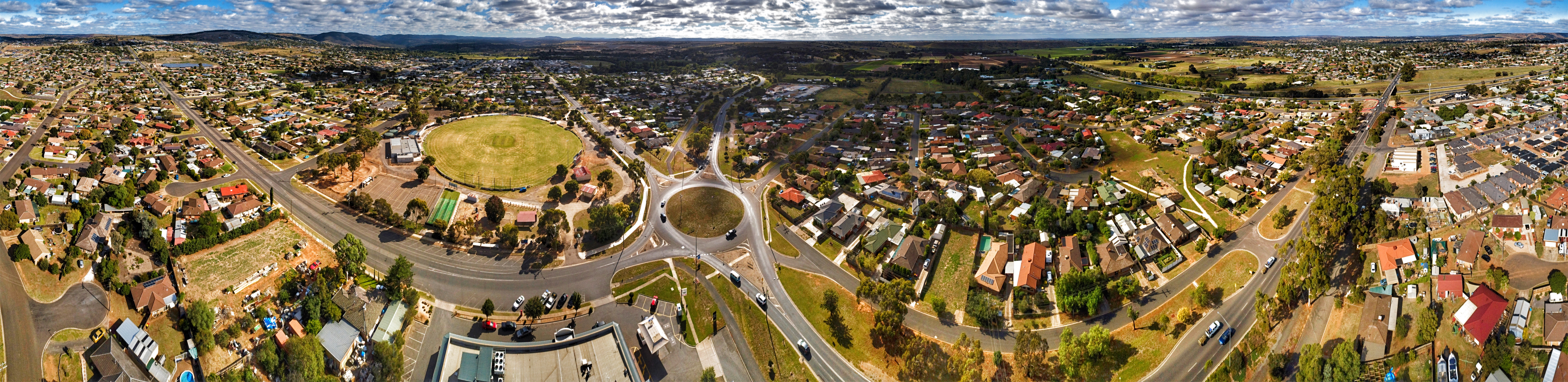
Aerial perspective of Darley in Bacchus Marsh

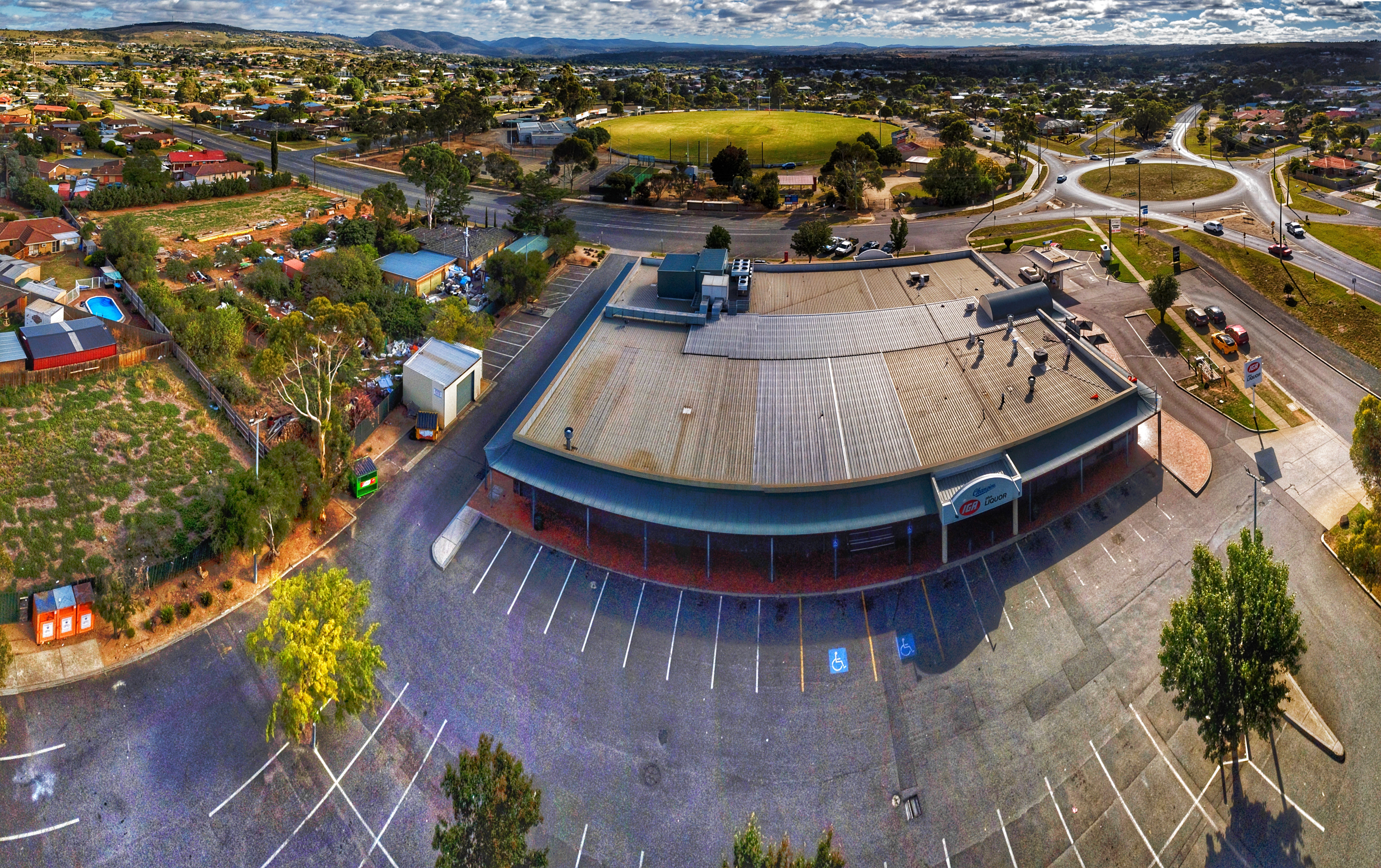
Aerial perspective of Bacchus Marsh IGA. Taken Autumn 2018.
