= Myrniong =

- Town
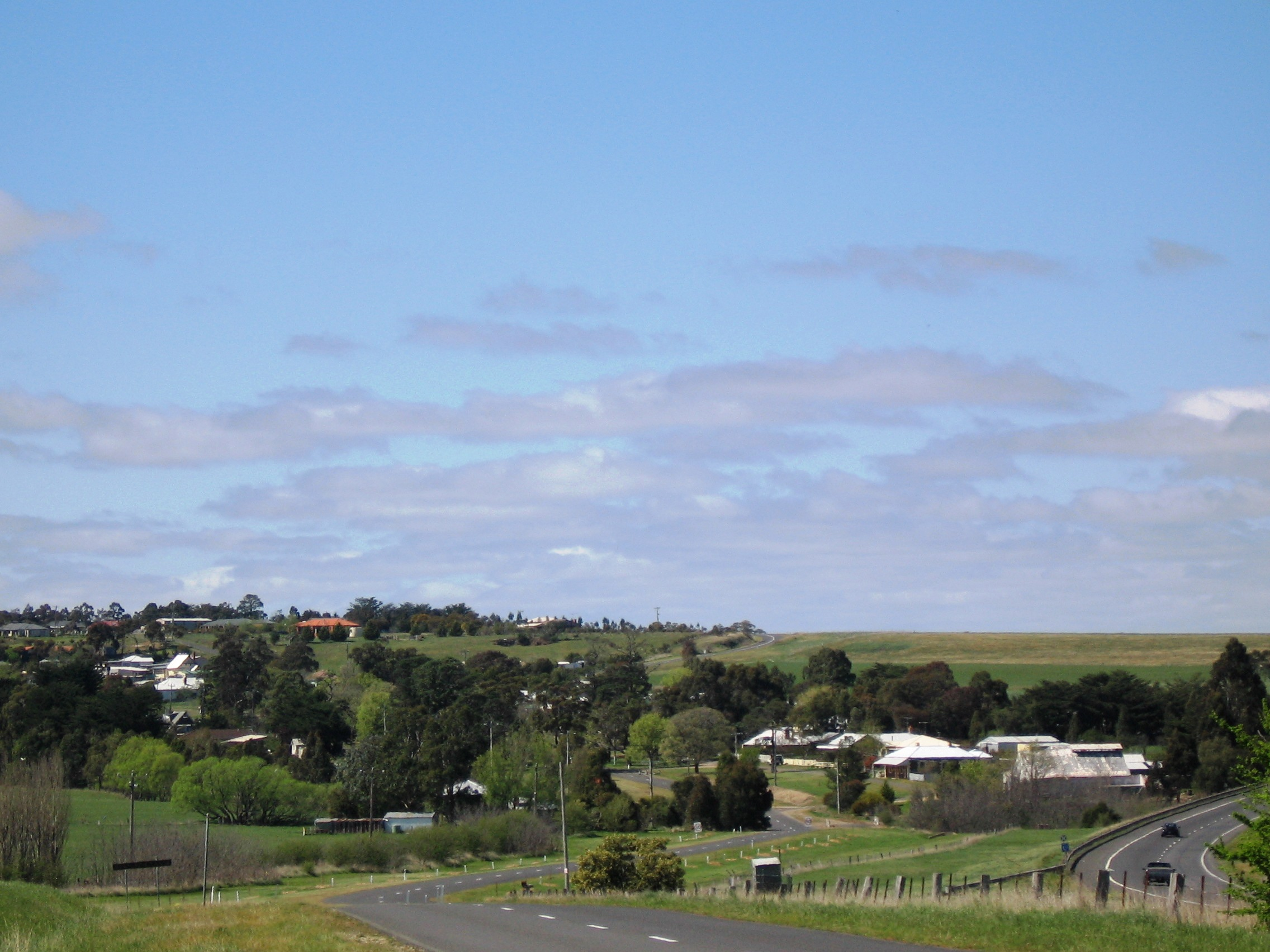
- Myrniong seen from the west. The Western Freeway can be seen to the right.

- Interactive map of Myrniong
- Coordinates: 37°37′0″S 144°20′0″E
- Country: Australia
- State: Victoria
- LGA: Shire of Moorabool
- Location: 69 km (43 mi) NW of Melbourne; 15 km (9.3 mi) W of Bacchus Marsh

Government
  - State electorate: Eureka
  - Federal division: Hawke

Population
  - Total: 404 (2016 census)
- Postcode: 3341
Localities around Myrniong
| Greendale | Korobeit | Lerderderg |
| Ballan | Myrniong | Lerderderg |
| Ingliston | Pentland Hills | Darley |

Myrniong (/ˈmɜːrnɒŋ/) is a town in Victoria, Australia. The town is near the Western Freeway, 69 kilometres (43 mi) north west of the state capital, Melbourne and 15 kilometres (9 mi) west of Bacchus Marsh. Situated close by the Lerderderg River, at the 2016 census, Myrniong had a population of 404. The town is in the eastern area of the Shire of Moorabool local government area.

Myrniong was named for the murrnong plant, the local indigenous word for yam daisy, a popular food source. European settlement began in around 1850 with local farmers producing wheat for hungry gold miners at nearby Blackwood. Later production concentrated on beef and dairy.

The Post Office opened on 6 September 1858 as Pentland Hills, was renamed Myrniong in 1872 and closed in 1970.

Myrniong is known for its many bluestone buildings, including the historic Plough Hotel, established in 1859, and the Anglican church. Other attractions in the area include Pykes Creek Reservoir, providing water to the market gardens in nearby Bacchus Marsh and Mount Blackwood, an extinct volcano offering panoramic views over the Wombat State Forest. and Werribee Gorge State Park. A historic Car sprint is held in the town each April, and in March an annual music event, 'Myrniong Music in The Park', is a fixture on the Blues music Calendar.
