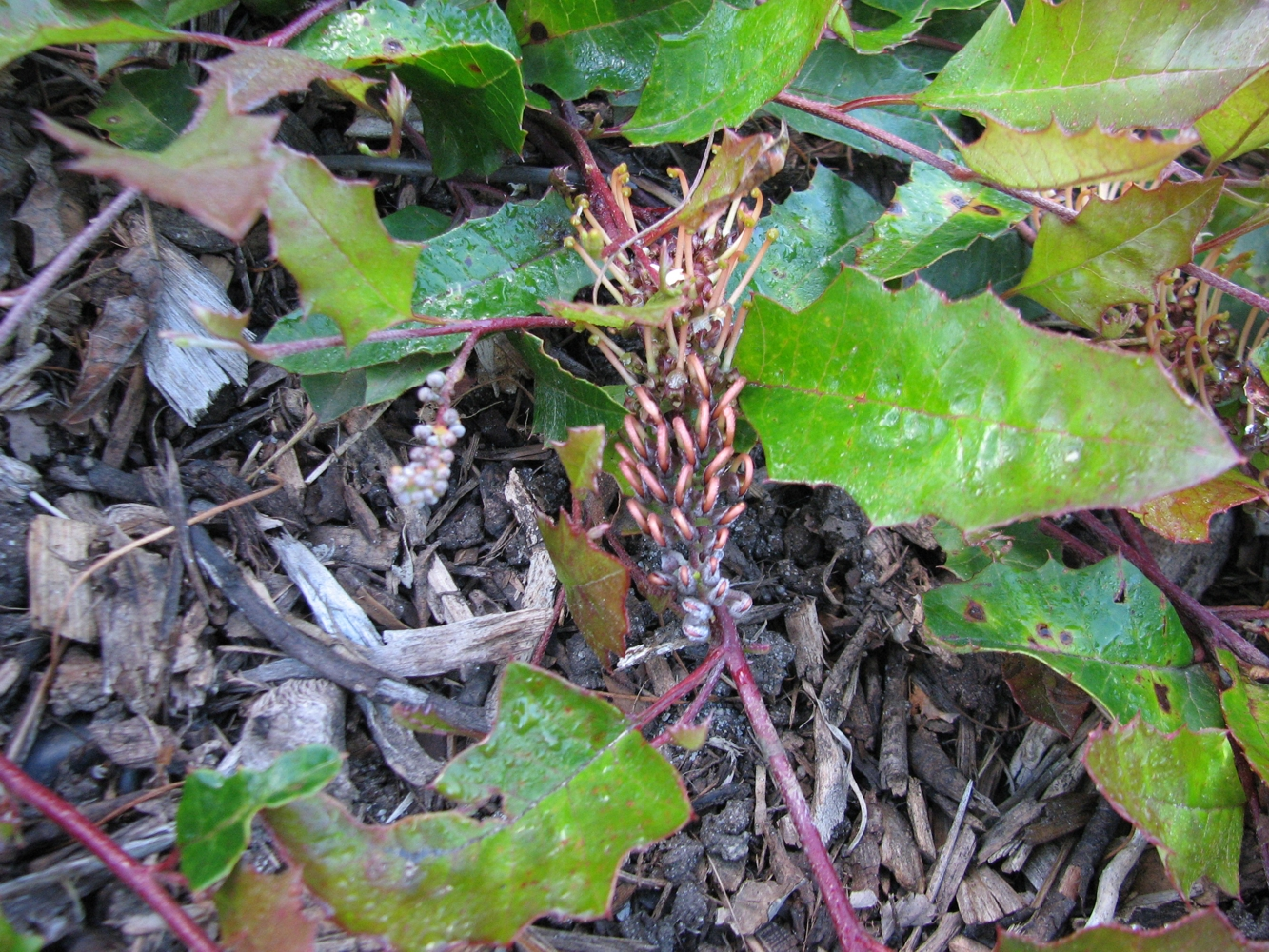
- Grevillea repens in the Royal Botanic Gardens Victoria

Scientific classification
- Kingdom: Plantae
- Clade: Tracheophytes
- Clade: Angiosperms
- Clade: Eudicots
- Order: Proteales
- Family: Proteaceae
- Genus: Grevillea
- Species: G. repens

Binomial name
- Grevillea repens F.Muell. ex Meisn.

= Grevillea repens =

Creeping grevillea

Species of shrub endemic to Victoria, Australia

Grevillea repens, the creeping grevillea, is a species of flowering plant in the family Proteaceae and is endemic to Victoria, Australia. It is a prostrate, often mat-forming shrub, that has leaves with 5 to 19 teeth or lobes, and light green or grey, toothbrush-like flowers with reddish striations and a deep red, or dull orange to yellow style.

== Description ==
Grevillea repens is a prostrate trailing, often mat-forming shrub that typically grows up to 3 m (9.8 ft) wide. Its leaves are narrowly oblong to egg-shaped or elliptic, 15–115 mm (0.59–4.53 in) long and 10–40 mm (0.39–1.57 in) wide, usually with 5 to 19 teeth or lobes up to 3 mm (0.12 in) long and more or less evenly spaced around the edges. The teeth are sometimes sharply pointed and the lower surface is usually covered with wavy hairs pressed against the surface. The flowers are arranged in clusters on the ends of the branches, on one side of a rachis 35–80 mm (1.4–3.1 in) long, and are light green or grey with reddish striations, the pistil 16–19 mm (0.63–0.75 in) long and the style deep red, or dull orange to yellow and glabrous. Flowering occurs from October to April and the dry fruit is a silky-hairy follicle 10–12 mm (0.39–0.47 in) long.

== Taxonomy ==
Grevillea repens was first formally described in 1853 by Ferdinand von Mueller from an unpublished description by Carl Meissner and von Mueller's description was published in the Votes and Proceedings of the Legislative Assembly of the Victorian Government. The specific epithet (repens) means "prostrate" or "creeping".

This grevillea is a member of the 'southern holly-leaf grevilleas' and is closely related to G. obtecta.

== Distribution and habitat ==
Creeping grevillea is found in montane eucalypt forests in two main areas in central Victoria: an eastern population centred in the Kinglake area, and a western population, from near Daylesford to the Lerderderg Gorge area. Plants from the eastern region (the Mt Slide form) can reproduce both sexually by seed and clonally by 'root-suckering', and tend to display lower fertility than plants from the western (Daylesford) population which regenerate by seed or by re-shooting from a lignotuber after disturbance events such as fire. Some clonally reproducing plants in the eastern region have been found to be triploid (three sets of chromosomes) compared to the usual diploid state for this species (2n=20). The Lerderderg Gorge populations show a closer genetic and morphological affinity to plants from the Daylesford area than those from the Kinglake area. Western populations display the greatest range of floral colour variants (with green to dark red styles) while those in eastern populations range from dark red to deep burgundy.

== Conservation status ==
This grevillea is listed as "endangered" under the Victorian Government Flora and Fauna Guarantee Act 1988 and as "rare in Victoria" on the Department of Environment and Primary Industries Advisory List of Rare Or Threatened Plants In Victoria.
