= Greendale, Victoria =

Greendale
- Town
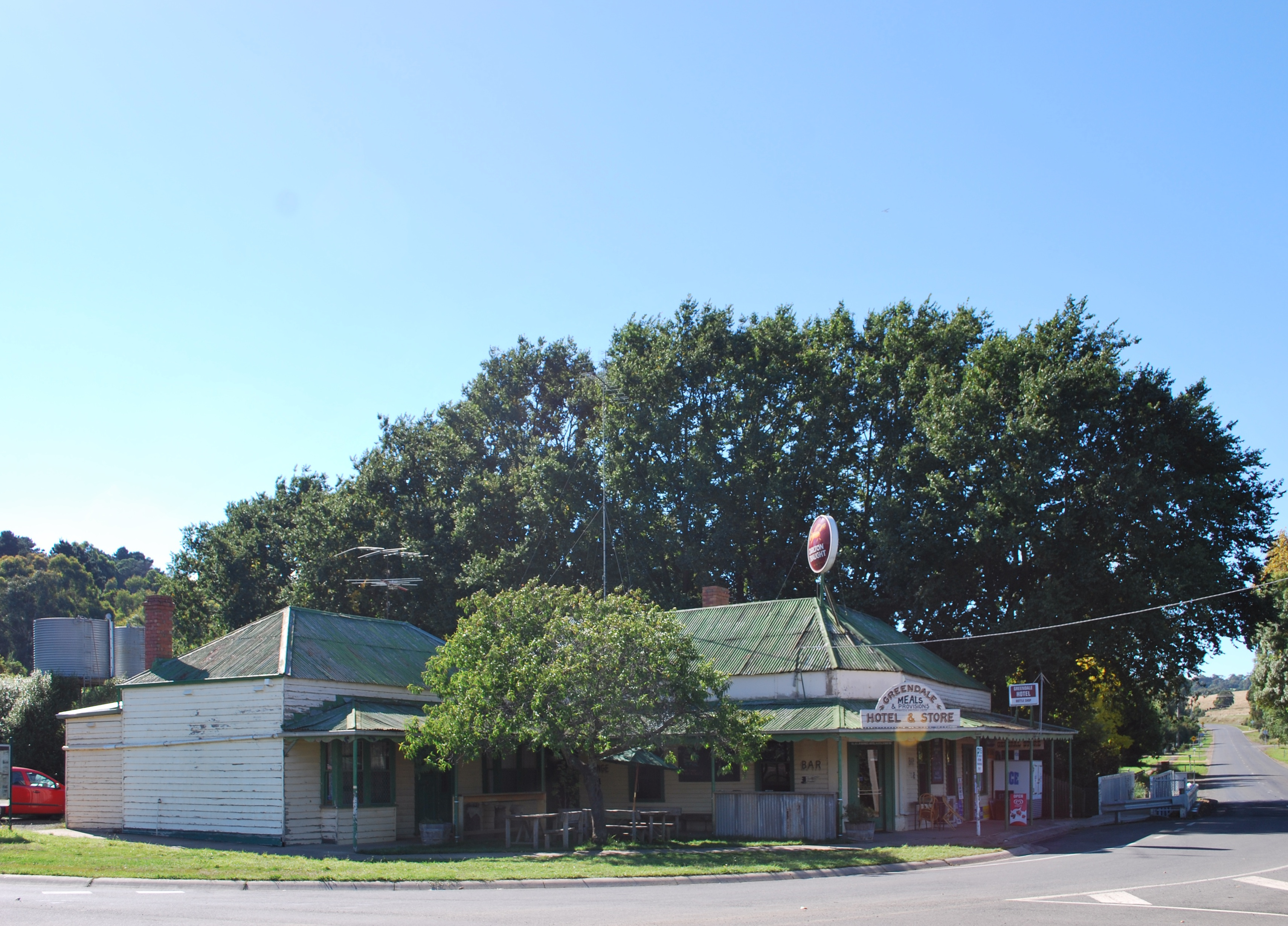
- Greendale Hotel and general store

- Interactive map of Greendale
- Coordinates: 37°34′1″S 144°19′1″E
- Country: Australia
- State: Victoria
- LGA: Shire of Moorabool
- Location: 81 km (50 mi) NW of Melbourne; 46 km (29 mi) E of Ballarat; 22 km (14 mi) NW of Bacchus Marsh

Government
  - State electorates: Eureka; Macedon
  - Federal division: Hawke

Population
  - Total: 602 (2016 census)
- Postcode: 3341
Localities around Greendale
Blackwood	Blackwood	Lerderderg
Dales Creek	Greendale	Lerderderg
Ballan	Korobeit; Myrniong	Myrniong

Greendale is a town in central Victoria, Australia in the Shire of Moorabool local government area, 81 kilometres (50 mi) west north west of the state capital, Melbourne. At the 2016 census, Greendale and the surrounding area had a population of 602.

Prior to European settlement, the area around Greendale was inhabited by the Kutung, the Wathourung, the Wurunjeri, the Jaara and the Ngurelban indigenous tribes. When European settlers arrived in the area in the late 1830s conflict developed between the two groups. The early settlers noticed a variety of native flora and fauna including kangaroos, bandicoots, dingoes and two species of quoll.

Greendale Post Office opened on 1 January 1867.

John Cain, Premier of Victoria, was born in Greendale in 1882.
