= The Old River =

The Old
- Location of The Old River mouth in Victoria

Location
- Country: Australia
- State: Victoria
- Region: Victorian Midlands (IBRA), Western District
- Local government area: Moorabool

Physical characteristics
- Source: Mount Bullengarook, Blackwood Ranges, Great Dividing Range
  - location: Lerderderg State Park
  - coordinates: 37°31′06″S 144°25′51″E
  - elevation: 575 m (1,886 ft)
- Mouth: confluence with the Lerderderg River
  - location: below Mount Blackwood
  - coordinates: 37°33′34″S 144°23′49″E
  - elevation: 271 m (889 ft)
- Length: 7 km (4.3 mi)

Basin features
- River system: Port Phillip catchment
- National park: Lerderderg State Park

The Old River is a perennial river of the Port Phillip catchment, in the Western District region of the Australian state of Victoria.

== Location and features ==
The Old River rises below Mount Bullengarook, part of the Blackwood Ranges of the Great Dividing Range, in remote country within the Lerderderg State Park. The river flows generally south by west before reaching its confluence with the Lerderderg River below Mount Blackwood. The river descends approximately 304 metres (997 ft) over its 7-kilometre (4.3 mi) course.

== See also ==
- List of rivers of Australia § Victoria
