= Wombat State Forest =

Protected area in Victoria, Australia

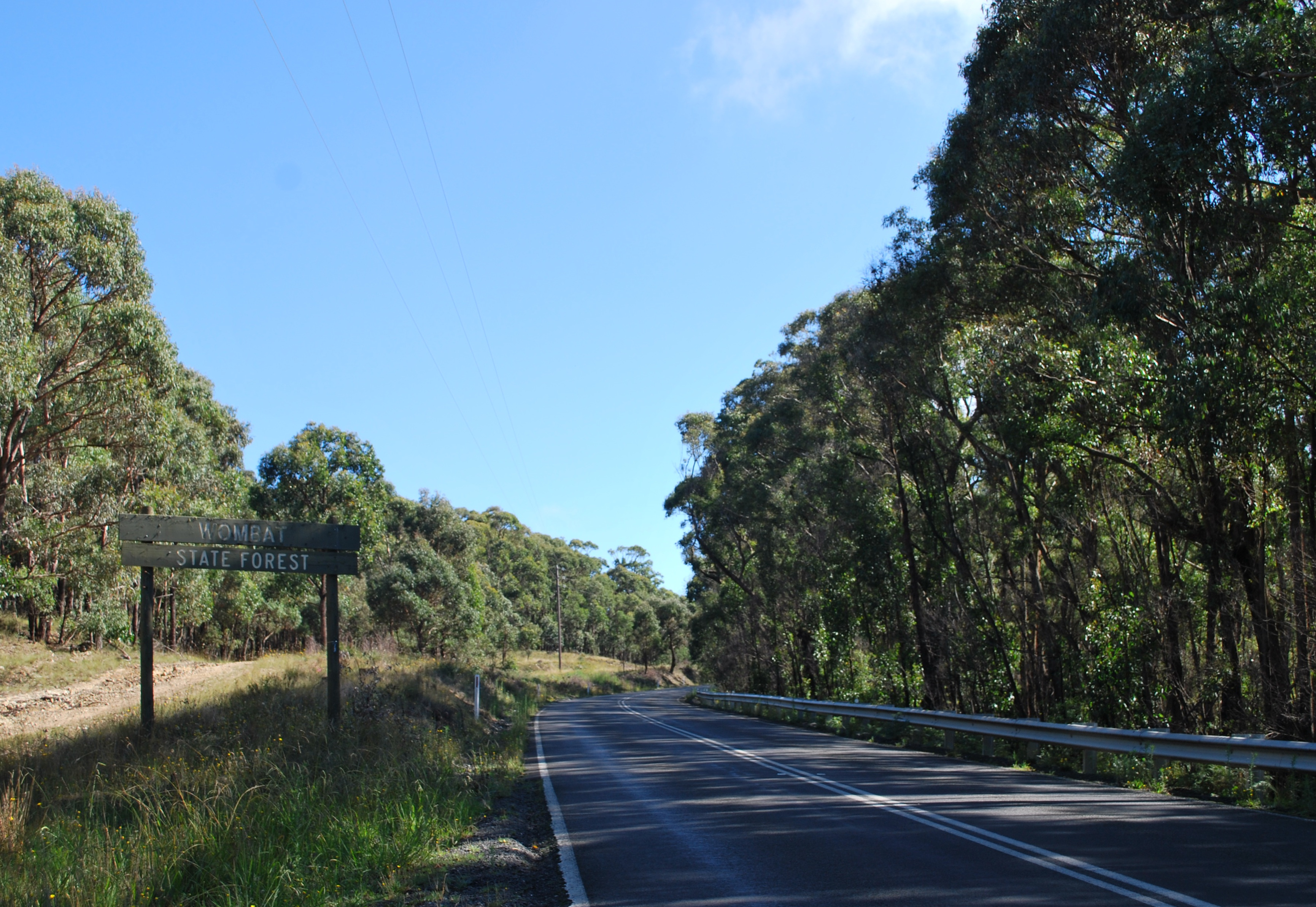
- Entering the Wombat State Forest, south of Blackwood

- Location within Victoria
- Location: Victoria
- Nearest city: Daylesford (formerly Wombat)
- Coordinates: 37°27′S 144°17′E
- Area: 700 km^{2} (270 sq mi)
- Established: 1871
- Governing body: Department of Sustainability and Environment

The Wombat State Forest is located 50 kilometres (31 mi) west of Melbourne, Victoria, Australia, between Woodend and Daylesford, at the Great Dividing Range. The forest is approximately 70,000 hectares (170,000 acres) in size and sits upon Ordovician or Cenozoic sediments. The Wombat State Forest was proclaimed in 1871.

The only initiative in Australia to introduce community forestry, within the internationally understood context, is in the Wombat State Forest. It is managed by the Department of Environment, Land, Water and Planning. The management plan covers several areas such as firewood and other products; protection of water supplies; conservation of biodiversity; and conservation of landscape. Other areas of importance include cultural heritage, research, education, tourism, recreation, mineral exploration, mining, and grazing.

On 24 June 2021, the Andrews State Government, following extensive review and recommendation, declared that the Wombat State Forest would be added to the National Park register, providing it with additional protections. The proposed amalgamation of the nearby Lerderderg State Park and the Wombat State Forest would create the new Wombat-Lerderderg National Park providing it the highest protections against logging whilst maintaining sustainable ecotourism and protections for wildlife and the environment. The process is expected to be completed by 2030.

== Etymology ==
The forest is probably named after the Wombat township (now Daylesford) where it sits geographically.

== History ==
This forest was the testing ground for techniques, ideas and attitudes that shaped resource management and sawmilling well into the twentieth century.

— Forest historian Norm Houghton

The Dja Dja Wurrung, Wurundjeri and Wadawurrung peoples inhabited the area that is now state forest land. In its early days prior to European settlement, it probably extended to a much larger area than it does today.

19th century

Much of the forest land was logged extensively following the gold rush era of the mid-19th century, when gold was discovered in Blackwood. The timber was used to line mine shafts and as tunnel supports, to fire mine boilers, as railway sleepers, as piles for piers and docks and other heavy construction, as electricity poles, and as domestic fuel. In 1860, the Land Act (Section 80) was passed, prohibiting the slashing and clearing of trees. Eleven years later, in 1871, the Wombat State Forest was established.

By 1884, there were 36 saw mills in operation in the Wombat and Bullarook Forests, the wood being shipped to Melbourne and around Victoria. There was little or no regeneration, and the young trees were burned. That eventually resulted in what a late 1890s Royal Commission described as a "ruined forest". For the next 50 years, the forest was closed to mining and logging, to allow it to regenerate.

20th century

By the late 1960s, effective regeneration of the forest had not occurred. At that time, shelter wood logging was commenced, which involved the removal of up to 80% of trees, followed by a regeneration burn, and a final removal 10-20 years later. Areas at the western edge of the forest were cleared and converted to pine plantations.

In the mid-1980s, a "Timber Industry Strategy" was introduced, which established sustainable yields for the forestry industry. The sustainable yield for the Wombat Forest was set at historical sawlog license levels of around 70,000m3 per annum, with an added 63,000 tonnes of waste going as woodchips to the CSR Bacchus Marsh hardboard plant. The level of the permitted yield quickly led to concerns from the surrounding community.

In 2001, the local community published its own findings about the forest's sustainable management, which became an example of community involvement in a state-run management plan. In 2010, community groups raised fears that logging could resume in the forest because the State Government allocated logging licenses in western Victoria.

== Geography ==
The Wombat State Forest straddles the Great Dividing Range. The forest extends along both sides of the Dividing Range, from Creswick to Mount Macedon. There are about 400 volcanoes in a stretch of the Great Dividing Range that extends from Kilmore in the north east to Mount Gambier in South Australia to the west. Mount Babbington, Mount Wilson and Blue Mount are extinct volcanoes within the Wombat State Forest.

The prevalent geological make up is of Ordovician or Cenozoic sediments. The rock types are of volcanic origin, dated to the Palaeozoic era. Quaternary basalts, all of volcanic origin, constituted the forested land to the west of the Wombat State Forest. These lands were converted to agricultural zone due to the suitability to grow crops under abundant rainfall conditions. However, Ordovician or sedimentary soils, due to its poor soil conditions for farming, have remained undisturbed. The geological evolution belongs to the Quaternary period of the Cenozoic Era which has emerged from an "ash dominated rainforest to dry sclerophyll forest". The preceding geological evolutions in the order of their ascending order of dating are: the Palaeozoic Era, the Precambrian Era, and the Mesozoic Era.

The Wombat State Forest contains the headwaters of the Lerderderg, Moorabool, Coliban, Campaspe and Loddon rivers. A notable feature in the forest is the extent of mineral springs which is said to account for 80% of Australia's mineral springs. The mineral waters are rich in calcium, silica, magnesium, iron and sulphur. The volcanic activity of the region has supplemented the creation of mineral water- carbon dioxide mix that is seen in the form of bubbles emerging from the springs.

== Fauna, funga and flora ==
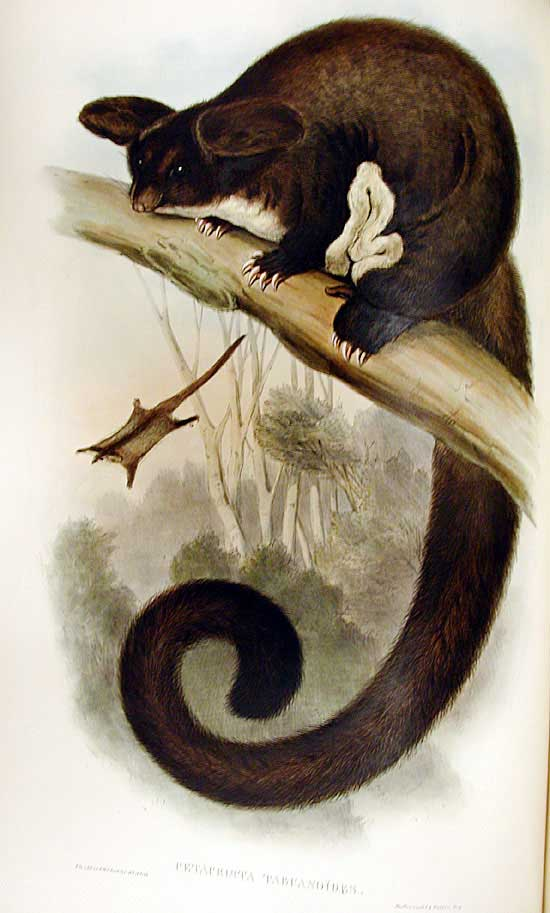
Within Victoria, the Wombat State Forest is the greater glider's most western range.

Fauna

The forest's faunal era emerged during the Precambrian Era, initially with cyanobacteria (blue green algae) and soft bodied marine organisms. These were followed by the Cambrian Period with Metazoans dominating the sea, followed by the earliest vertebrates of the Ordovician Period, the Carboniferous/Permian Period of insects, Triassic Period of early small dinosaurs, Jurassic Period of dinosaurs, Cretaceous Period, Palaeocene Period of mammals, Oligocene Period of early primates, Miocene Period of possums, kangaroos, koalas, bats, snakes, crocodiles and birds, and finally the Holocene Period of human civilization.

The native fauna consists of marsupials and monotremes, reptiles, amphibians, bats and birds. The greater glider (Petauroides volans) is the largest possum found in this forest. It has furry hair with the colour varying from grey to cream and with a pale underside. It has a large snout and large ears. Its range is in the western part of the Wombat State Forest. Several state-listed threatened bird species occur in the forest including the great egret, intermediate egret, grey goshawk, Australian masked owl, powerful owl and square-tailed kite. Additionally, the forest is the western extent of the range of the red-browed treecreeper and olive whistler.

Funga

Fungi comprise the next biggest kingdom after Animalia and the Wombat Forest is a rich storehouse of fungi. Hundreds of fungal species have been documented across the forest's diverse habitats. Fungi play a vital ecological role through their mutually beneficial symbioses with the great majority of plants as well as with numerous animal species. They are also important recyclers of organic matter, breaking down complex molecules, returning organic matter to the soil and making nutrients available to plants. To put it simply, without fungi, the forest wouldn't exist.

The major morphological fungal groups such as agarics (fungi that typically have an umbrella shape and gills beneath the cap, commonly known as mushrooms), puffballs, coral fungi, polypores, disc fungi, clubs and lichenised fungi exist in the forest. Numerous species of myxomycetes (slime moulds) have also been recorded."

Parasitic fungi also occur in the forest. While some parasitic fungi can become problematic such as Armillaria luteobubalina, a fungus that causes forest dieback, parasitic fungi also play an important ecological role in creating habitats for many animals, such as the great number of invertebrates, mammals, birds and reptiles that rely on tree hollows.

Fungi have been found in every habitat type in the Wombat Forest. Like animals and plants, fungi have preferences for different habitats; some grow only on fallen wood, others on animal faeces, some at the base of particular tree species, in moss beds or forest floor humus, some occur only after fires, and others are found in dry bare earth. Many fungal species fruit between late summer and early winter, depending on temperature, rainfall and various other environmental factors such as soil chemistry. Fire also plays a role in triggering the fruiting of some fungi. Furthermore, fungi provide an important food source for many of the Wombat Forest's animals including mammals, birds, reptiles and invertebrates.

Fungi are still barely recognised as a vital part of Australia's biodiversity. Although Australia has national, state and territory biodiversity conservation strategies and has ratified international conventions, most Australian conservation legislation overlooks fungi. While several countries have comprehensively mapped and RED-listed thousands of fungal species, only a handful of Australian fungi have been formally protected and only at a state level.

Groups such as Wombat Forestcare, Fungimap and various field naturalist clubs are making huge efforts and progress toward lifting the profile of fungi through acquiring knowledge of their diversity and distribution and contributing to fungal conservation.

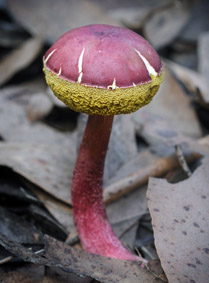
Boletellus obscurecoccineus grows in the Wombat Forest

Flora

During the forest's geological evolutionary process, flora initially emerged in oceans 630 million years ago. This was followed by plants emerging in late Ordovician Period and Early Silurian Period. They were succeeded by the Jurassic Period of Ancient Flora (including Gondwana Cretaceous Period and West Gondwana) as is evidenced in Australia with the emergence of conifers. The Palaeocene Period of tree species was succeeded by the Eocene Period of grasses which was followed by rain forests. With the Miocene Period, eucalypt forests emerged, followed by the Pliocene Period of cooler climate with some northern tropical species emerging, and finally followed by the Quaternary Period of dry climate with dry vegetation.

The native flora broadly consist of small medium and tall trees; shrubs of varying sizes; climbers; native herbs/forbs, grasses; rushes, sedges and aquatics; lilies, ferns and orchids. The open forest is dominated by a number of eucalypt species including messmate (Eucalyptus obliqua), broad-leaf peppermint (E. dives), narrow-leaf peppermint (E. radiata), manna gum (E. viminalis) and candlebark (E. rubida). Swamp gum (Eucalyptus ovata) and Yarra gum (E. yarraensis) are also present in the forest.

Rare or threatened plant species of record include wiry bossiaea (Bossiaea cordigera), matted flax-lily (Dianella amoena), Brooker's gum (Eucalyptus brookeriana), Fryerstown grevillea (Grevillea obtecta), creeping grevillea (G. repens), hairy beard-heath (Leucopogon microphyllus var. pilibundus), satinwood (Nematolepis squamea subsp. squamea), small sickle greenhood (Pterostylis lustra), scented bush-pea (Pultenaea graveolens) as well as two endemic species Wombat leafless bossiaea (Bossiaea vombata) and Wombat bush-pea (Pultenaea reflexifolia).

== Ecological classification ==
Ecological classification of native vegetation in the Wombat Forest has been carried out, with 16 different Ecological Vegetation Classes (EVCs) being identified. The widely varying vegetation is a reflection of ecological diversity of the forest "in geology, soil type, aspect, climate, altitude and position in the landscape." Under the EVC classification system followed in Victoria, the criteria adopted covers "depletion (what is left since European settlement), degradation, current threats and rarity". Shrubby Foothill Forest which is found on both sides of the Great Divide accounts for 57.66% under the least concern category while the Swampy Riparian Woodland and Streambank Shrubland are under the endangered category.

== Community management ==
Wombat Forest Community Forest Management (CFM) is a cooperative process in which the community of Wombat has been entrusted the responsibility to manage the Wombat State Forest. The management initiative started in 2002 with inputs from experts in forest management and other disciplines. The slogan "Our Forests Our Future" started the reform process. The University of Melbourne facilitated by providing the consultancy inputs in preparing a review report on collaborative forest management and community participation in Australia. This report was titled "Collaborative Forest Management – A Review".

The Wombat Forest Community Biodiversity Research Project was developed to determine what kinds of animals live in the Wombat Forest, and what sort of habitats do they prefer. The project is a collaboration of the Biodiversity Working Group and the Arthur Rylah Institute for Environmental Research.

== Tourism ==
Lyonville Mineral Springs, Garden of St Erth, Martin Street Coffee is a cafe and coffee roastery in Blackwood Township, the Lerderderg Heritage River Walk, and Nolans Creek Picnic Area are among the tourist attractions within the state forest. Other historic places of interest include the Andersons Mill, Balt Camp, Pioneer Sawmill, and Yankee Mine. Train buffs can travel by vintage diesel railcar through the forest.

== See also ==
- Lerderderg State Park
- Great Otway National Park
