= Hibbertia synandra =

Scientific classification
- Kingdom: Plantae
- Clade: Tracheophytes
- Clade: Angiosperms
- Clade: Eudicots
- Order: Dilleniales
- Family: Dilleniaceae
- Genus: Hibbertia
- Species: H. synandra

Binomial name
- Hibbertia synandra F.Muell.

Species of flowering plant

Hibbertia synandra is a species of flowering plant in the family Dilleniaceae and is endemic to Queensland. It was first formally described in 1864 by Ferdinand von Mueller in Fragmenta Phytographiae Australiae from specimens collected near Rockingham Bay by John Dallachy.

== See also ==
- List of Hibbertia species
