= Newbury, Victoria =

Locality in Victoria, Australia

Newbury Victoria
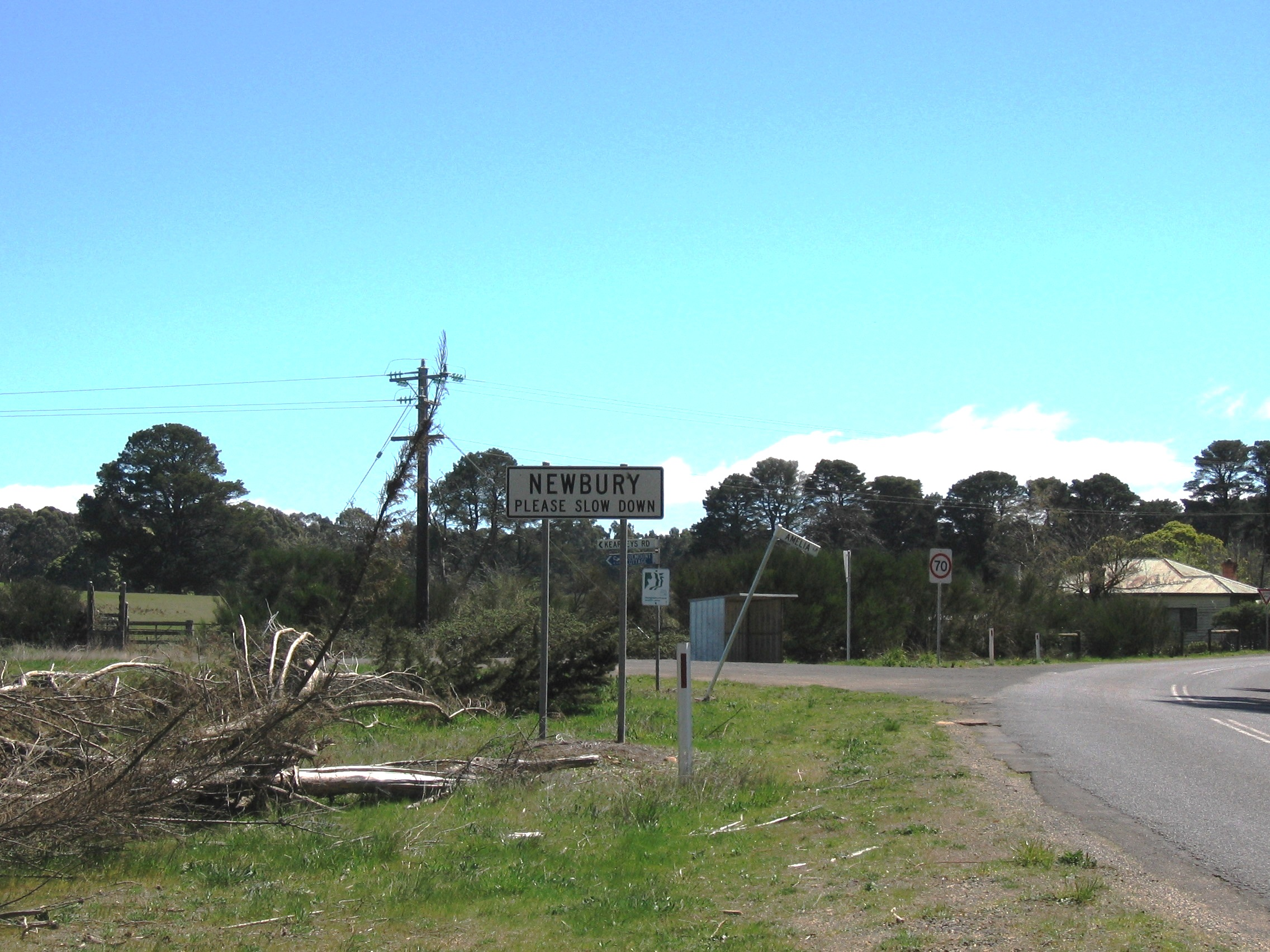
- Entering Newbury from the south

- Coordinates: 37°26′S 144°17′E
- Population: 71 (2016 census)
- Postcode(s): 3458
- Location: 96 km (60 mi) NW of Melbourne; 30 km (19 mi) SE of Daylesford, Victoria; 8 km (5 mi) S of Trentham
- LGA(s): Shire of Hepburn
- State electorate(s): Macedon
- Federal division(s): Ballarat

Newbury is a locality in central Victoria, Australia. The locality is in the Shire of Hepburn, 96 kilometres (60 mi) north west of the state capital, Melbourne. At the 2016 census, Newbury had a population of 71. It lies between Trentham, Victoria and Blackwood, Victoria.

The television series The Man from Snowy River was filmed in Newbury. The locality is also home to a Buddhist monastery.
