= Barrys Reef =

- Town
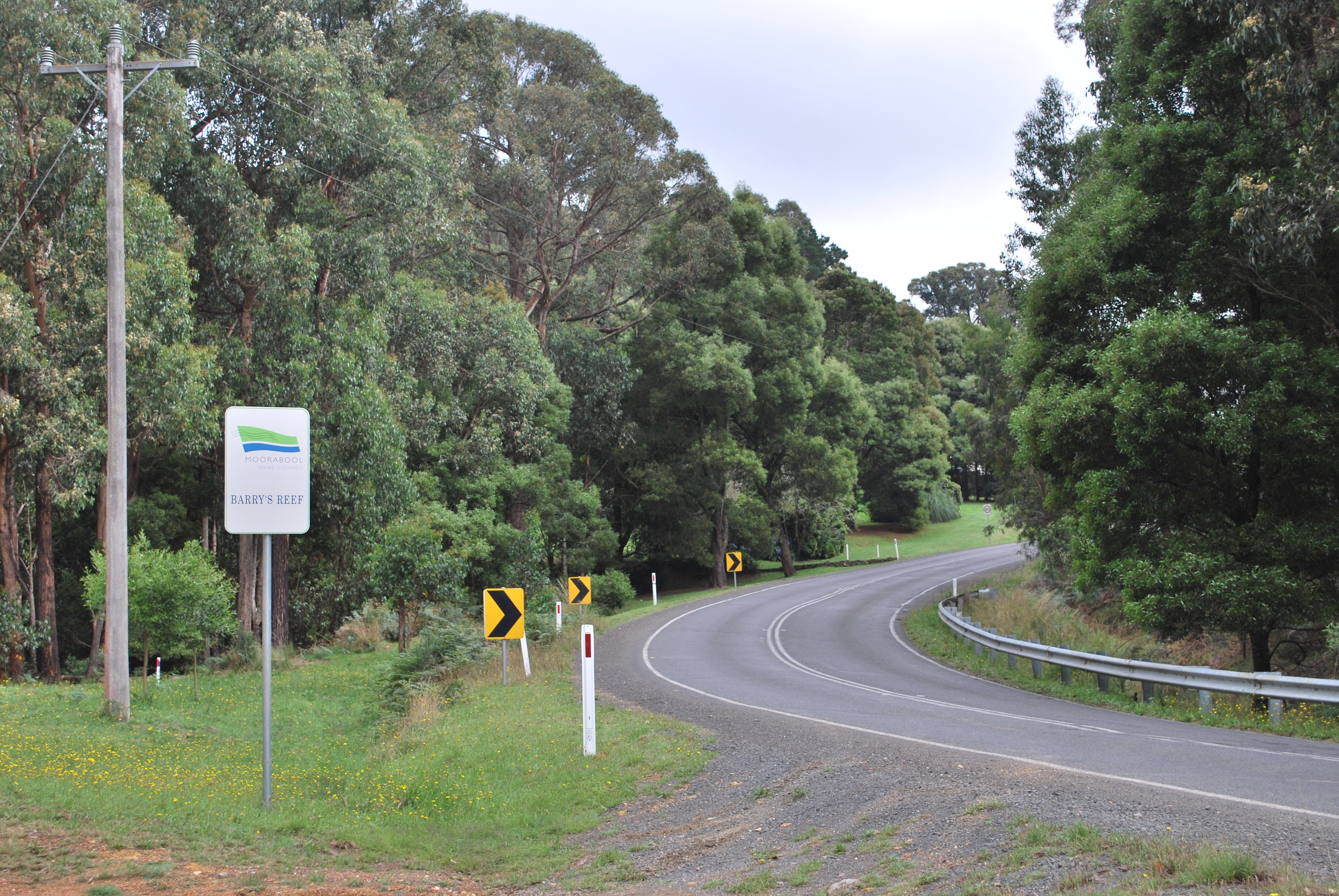
- Entering Barrys Reef

- Coordinates: 37°27′S 144°17′E
- Country: Australia
- State: Victoria
- LGA: Shire of Moorabool
- Location: 35 km (22 mi) N of Bacchus Marsh; 10 km (6.2 mi) S of Trentham; 86 km (53 mi) NW of Melbourne
- Established: 1856

Government
  - State electorate: Macedon
  - Federal division: Hawke
- Elevation: 662 m (2,172 ft)

Population
  - Total: 39 (2021 census)
- Postcode: 3458
Localities around Barrys Reef
Blackwood	Lerderderg	Lerderberg
Blackwood	Barrys Reef	Lerderderg
Blackwood	Blackwood	Blackwood

Barrys Reef (previously known as Bayup and then Barry's Reef) is a locality near Blackwood in Australia. The population of the locality is 39.

The local story of the origin of Barrys Reef refers to a man who was exiled from the town of Blackwood after a drunken brawl so he started walking to find a suitable place to live. After an hour of walking northwards away from Blackwood, the man (Barry Francis) found gold in the area and set up camp eventually building a house. Later on in the gold rush days Barry's Reef grew in size and at one stage had six hotels. After the gold rush the town eventually started to dwindle in population and was usually mistaken for North Blackwood. Nowadays the local people use the towns name as an excuse for not living in Blackwood or Trentham.
