= Lerderderg River =

Lerderderg The Lerdy
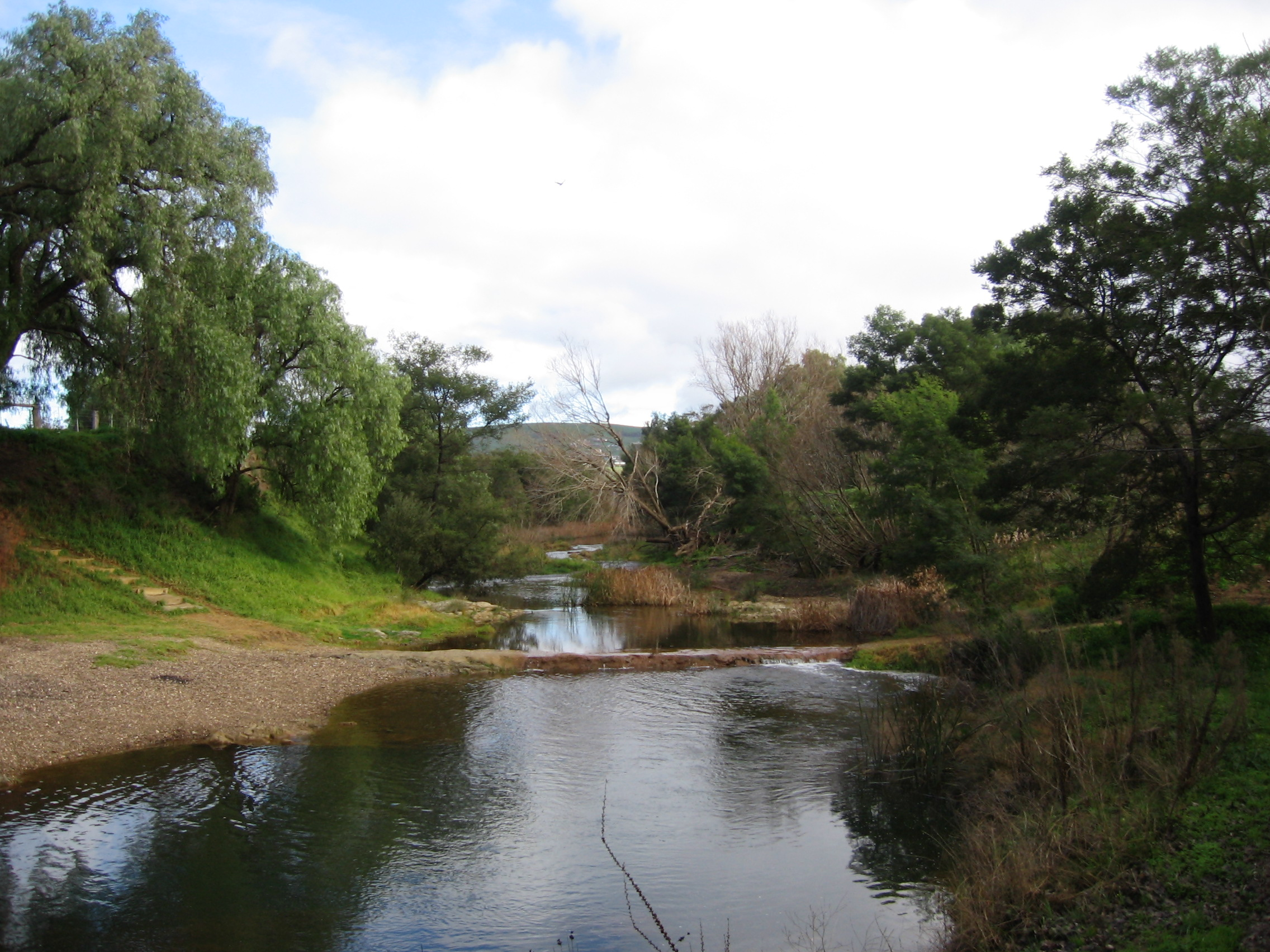
- Lerderderg River, near Darley

- Location of the Lerderderg River mouth in Victoria
- Nickname: The Lerdy

Location
- Country: Australia
- State: Victoria
- Region: Central Highlands, Victorian Midlands (IBRA)
- Local government area: Moorabool
- Town: Bacchus Marsh

Physical characteristics
- Source: Great Dividing Range
  - location: Wombat State Forest
  - coordinates: 37°26'38.5"S 144°14'00.1"E
  - elevation: 660 m (2,170 ft)
- Mouth: confluence with the Werribee River
  - location: Upper reaches of Melton Reservoir, downstream of Bacchus Marsh
  - coordinates: 37°42′27″S 144°31′08″E
  - elevation: 91 m (299 ft)
- Length: 40 km (25 mi)

Basin features
- River system: Port Phillip catchment
- Tributaries
  - left: Yankee Creek, The Old River, Goodman Creek
- National park: Lerderderg State Park

The Lerderderg River (known locally as The Lerdy) is a perennial river of the Port Phillip catchment, in the Central Highlands region of the Australian state of Victoria.

== Location and features ==
The Lerderderg River rises near Mt Wilson on the Great Dividing Range, in the Wombat State Forest. After being fed by several minor tributaries, the Lerderderg flows through the town of Blackwood where it is joined by Long Gully, Nugget and Yankee Creeks. The river flows generally east then south in a highly meandering course, through the Lerderderg Gorge within the Lerderderg State Park where it is joined by more minor tributaries, The Old River and Goodman Creek, before reaching its confluence with the Werribee River at the upper reaches of the Melton Reservoir, southeast of Bacchus Marsh. The river descends approximately 570 metres (1,870 ft) over its 40 kilometres (25 mi) course.

A diversion in the river's course, called the Lerderderg River diversion tunnel, located approximately 25 kilometres (16 mi) upriver from Bacchus Marsh, was constructed between 1855 and 1870. The tunnel was driven through a mountain spur in a horseshoe bend, diverting the river, and allowing the exposed river bed to be sluiced for alluvial gold.

The river is known for the Lerderderg Gorge Picnic Ground, camping, bushwalking, and fishing. In earlier days, gold was mined in the upper reaches, and some of the old mines (considered dangerous to enter) can be seen as you travel along the sluice on the east bank, which previously fed into those mines. The water slowed to a trickle during the severe drought of 2007. Even when not flowing, there are still a few popular swimming spots along the river, including "Harry's Hole", "Third Hole", and "The Pit", all of which are in the Lerderderg Gorge.

The river is traversed by the Western Freeway northeast of Bacchus Marsh.

== See also ==
- Lerderderg Track
- List of rivers of Australia
