= Lerderderg River diversion tunnel =

River tunnel in Victoria, Australia

Coordinates: 37°29′24″S 144°20′52″E

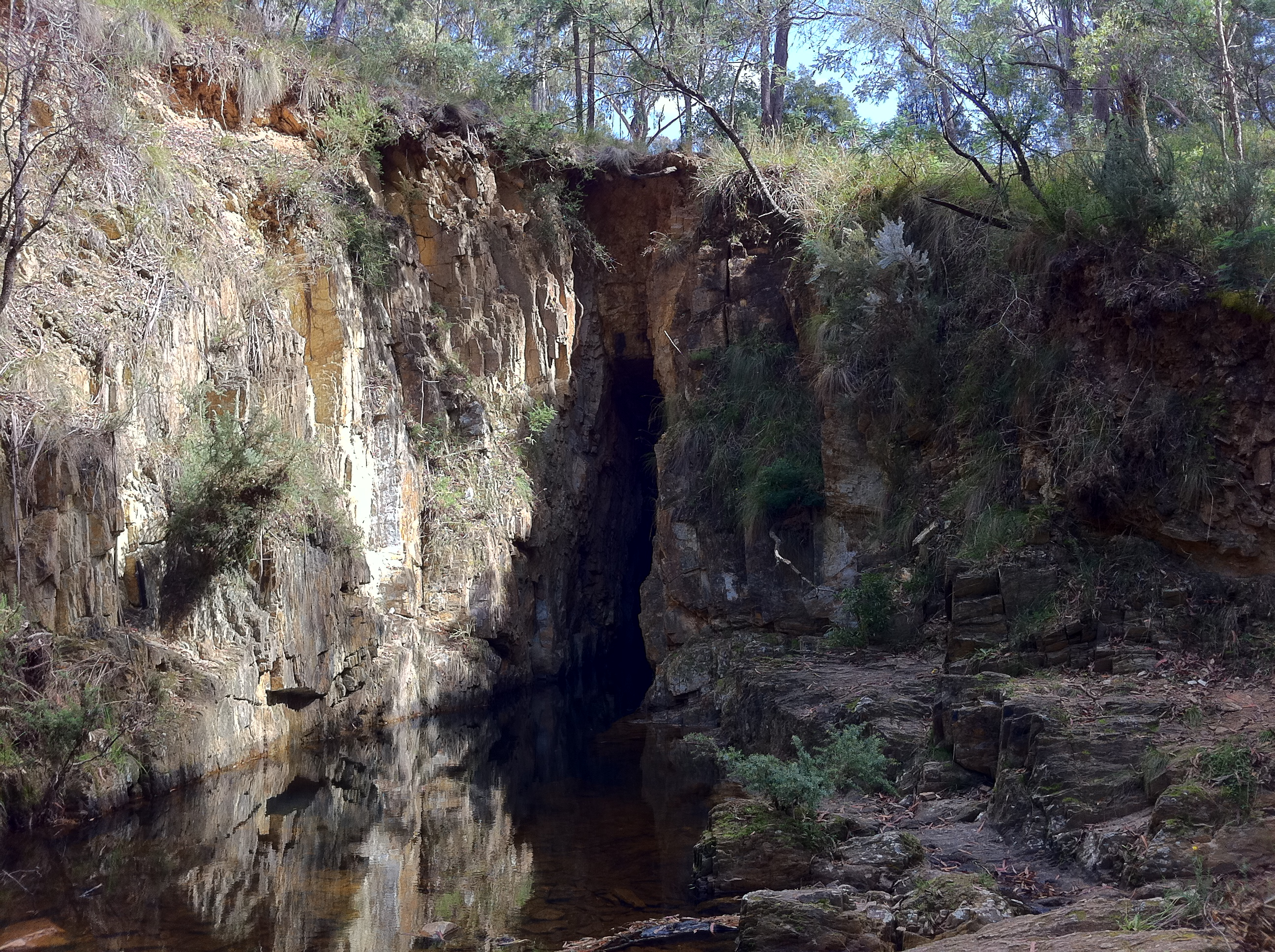
The Tunnel

The Lerderderg River diversion tunnel, known as The Tunnel, is located on the Lerderderg River approximately 25 km north-west of Bacchus Marsh, Victoria, Australia. The river flows around a spur in a horseshoe bend. The tunnel was driven through the spur diverting the river and allowing the exposed river bed to be sluiced for alluvial gold.

The tunnel was dug during the Victorian gold rush, most likely between 1855 and 1870, and is one of around thirteen river diversions surviving from that era.

The site is within the Lerderderg State Park. It is a 3.0 km walk along Byers Track upstream from the O'Briens Crossing Picnic Area.

== See also ==
- Lerderderg Gorge
- Lerderderg State Park
