= Great Dividing Trail =

Coordinates: 37.036406°S 146.921368°E

The major part of the Great Dividing Trail (but not all) is now re-badged as the Goldfields Track, a hiking and mountain-biking track through the historical Goldfields region of Victoria to the north-west and west of Melbourne. The trail passes along the southernmost parts of Australia's Great Dividing Range. The Goldfields Track, runs from the summit of Mount Buninyong to Bendigo, and is divided into the Eureka Track, Wallaby Track, Dry Diggings Track and Leanganook Track. A separate leg of the Great Dividing Trail, the Lerderderg Track, branches from Daylesford to Bacchus Marsh.

The trail was primarily intended for hiking, but has proven attractive to mountain bikers, and is being further developed for that purpose.

As the tracks pass through populated areas, they are suitable for day walks. In total, there are 304 kilometres of walking track. The tracks are overseen by the Great Dividing Trail Association, a non-profit, incorporated organisation.

== Route ==
The four sections are as follows:

Lerderderg Track (90 km)
This track runs from Bacchus Marsh to Daylesford, through Lerderderg State Park, via Mt Blackwood and the township of Blackwood.
Eureka Track (43 km)
This track runs from Mount Buninyong via Ballarat to Creswick.
Wallaby Track (52 km)
This track runs from Creswick, via Dean and Mollongghip to Daylesford.
Dry Diggings Track (58 km)
The first section to be implemented, it runs from Daylesford to Castlemaine via Hepburn Springs, Vaughan Springs and Fryerstown.
Leanganook Track (61 km)
This section runs from Castlemaine to Bendigo via Mount Alexander.

There is no particular order in which sections should be completed, and each can be done independently. In addition, each section has several entry points, meaning many different combinations are possible.

== See also ==
- Great Dividing Range
