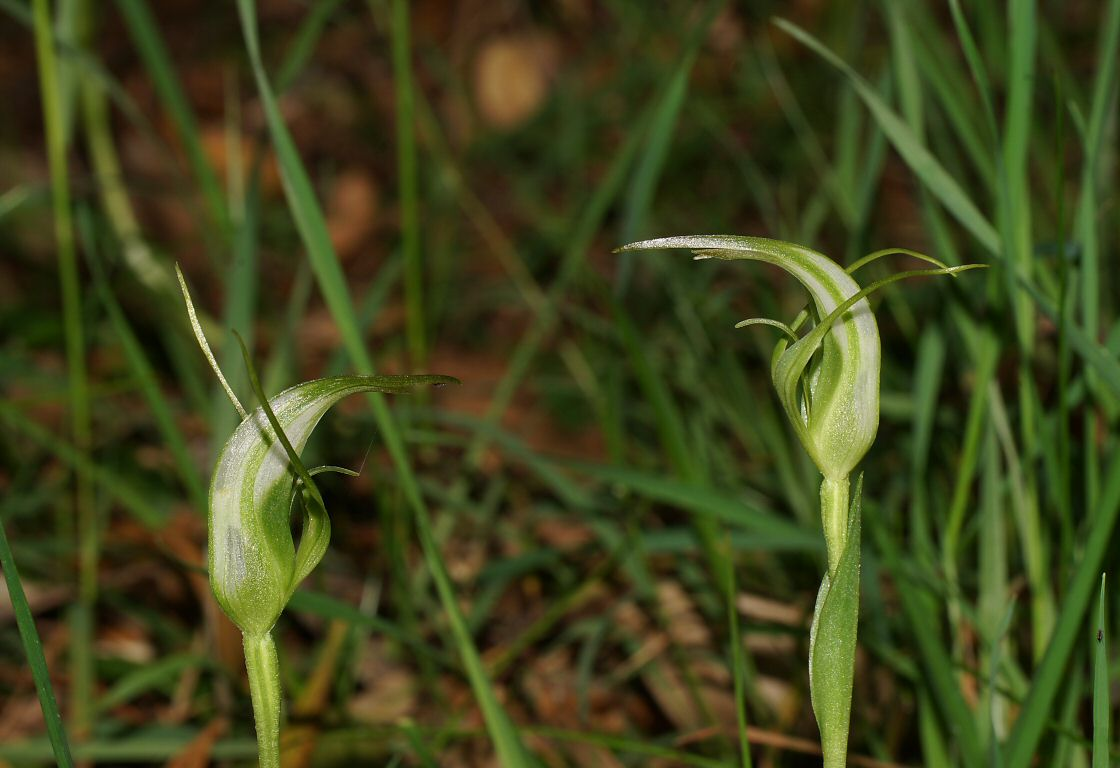
- In western Victoria

Scientific classification
- Kingdom: Plantae
- Clade: Embryophytes
- Clade: Tracheophytes
- Clade: Angiosperms
- Clade: Monocots
- Order: Asparagales
- Family: Orchidaceae
- Subfamily: Orchidoideae
- Tribe: Cranichideae
- Genus: Pterostylis
- Species: P. lustra

Binomial name
- Pterostylis lustra D.L.Jones

Synonyms
- Pterostylis sp. aff. furcata (Woolly Tea-tree); Pterostylis falcata auct. non R.S.Rogers: Barker, W.R., Barker, R.M., Jessop, J. & Vonow, H. (ed.) (18 March 2005) p.p.; Pterostylis furcata auct. non Lindl.: Weber, J.Z. & Bates, R. in Jessop, J.P. & Toelken, H.R. (ed.) (1986)

= Pterostylis lustra =

Small sickle greenhood

Species of orchid

Pterostylis lustra, commonly known as small sickle greenhood, is a species of orchid endemic to south-eastern Australia. Flowering plants have three to five bright green leaves at the base of the flowering stem and a single green and white, sickle-shaped flower.

== Description ==
Pterostylis lustra is a terrestrial, perennial, deciduous, herb with an underground tuber. Flowering plants have between three and five bright green, egg-shaped to lance-shaped leaves in a loose group at base of the flowering stem, each leaf 20–60 mm long and 8–15 mm wide. A single flower 30–50 mm long and 20–27 mm wide is borne on a spike 80–200 mm high. The flowers are green, white and sickle-shaped. The dorsal sepal and petals are fused, forming a hood or "galea" over the column but the dorsal sepal is longer than the petals and tapers to a point. The lateral sepals are erect with a gap between them and the galea, have thread-like tips 20-30mm long and there is a broad notch in the sinus between them. The labellum is dark-coloured, blunt, 15–25 mm long, about 3 mm wide and protrudes above the sinus. Flowering occurs from late October to February.

== Taxonomy and naming ==
Pterostylis lustra was first formally described in 2006 by David Jones from a specimen collected in the Wilsons Promontory National Park and the description was published in Australian Orchid Research. The specific epithet (lustra) is a Latin word meaning "illuminate" or "light up".

== Distribution and habitat ==
The small sickle greenhood is locally common in the southern half of Victoria where it grows in wet, swampy areas under Leptospermum lanigerum. It also occurs in northern Tasmania and in the south-east of South Australia.

== Conservation ==
Pterostylis lustra is classified as 'endangered' under the Tasmanian Government Threatened Species Protection Act 1995 and as 'endangered' in South Australia.
