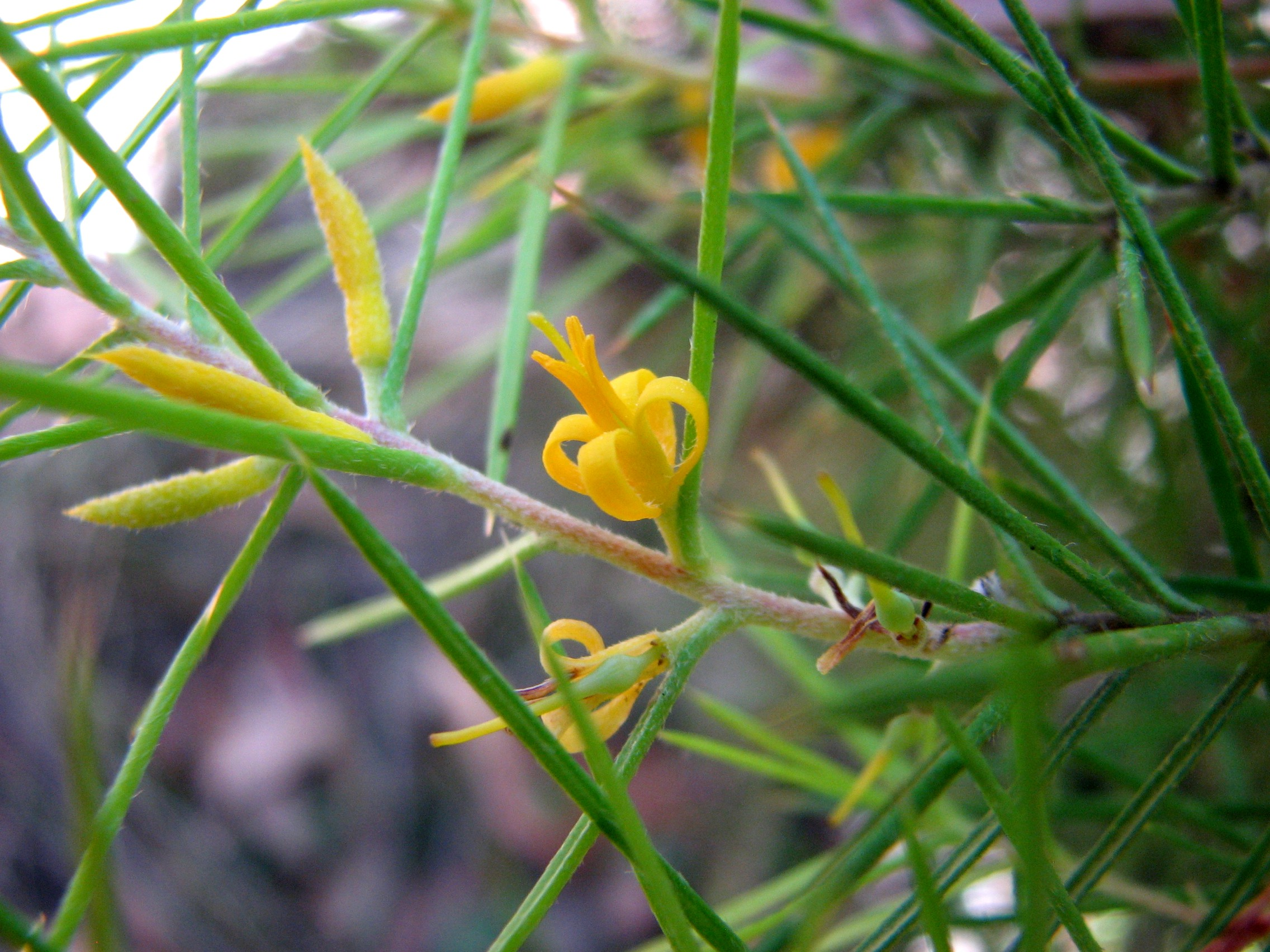
- In Otway Forest Park, Victoria

Scientific classification
- Kingdom: Plantae
- Clade: Tracheophytes
- Clade: Angiosperms
- Clade: Eudicots
- Order: Proteales
- Family: Proteaceae
- Genus: Persoonia
- Species: P. juniperina

Binomial name
- Persoonia juniperina Labill.
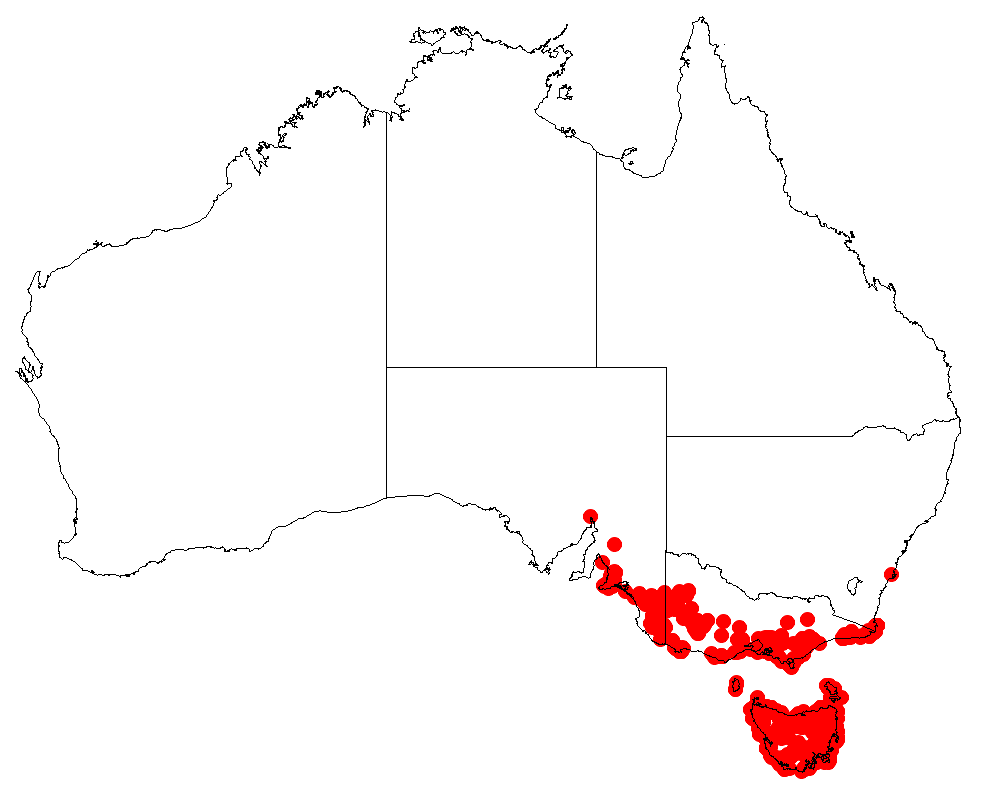
- Occurrence data from Australasian Virtual Herbarium

= Persoonia juniperina =

Prickly geebung

Species of flowering plant

Persoonia juniperina, commonly known as prickly geebung, is a species of flowering plant in the family Proteaceae and is endemic to south-eastern Australia. It is a small erect to low-lying shrub with smooth bark, hairy new branches, linear leaves, yellow flowers borne singly or in groups of up to forty in leaf axils, and yellowish green to purplish fruit.

== Description ==
Persoonia juniperina is an erect to low-lying shrub that typically grows to a height of 0.3–2 m (1 ft 0 in – 6 ft 7 in) with smooth bark and hairy young branchlets. The leaves are linear, 8–35 mm (0.31–1.38 in) long and 0.7–1.5 mm (0.028–0.059 in) wide. The flowers are borne singly or in groups of up to forty on a rachis up to 150 mm (5.9 in) long that grows into a leafy shoot after flowering, each flower on a hairy pedicel 0.8–3 mm (0.031–0.118 in) long. The tepals are yellow, sometimes hairy on the outside, 7–11 mm (0.28–0.43 in) long with yellow anthers. Flowering occurs from December to February and the fruit is an oval, yellowish green to purplish drupe about 10 mm (0.39 in) long and 8 mm (0.31 in) wide.

== Taxonomy ==
Persoonia juniperina was first formally described in 1805 by French naturalist Jacques Labillardière in his book Novae Hollandiae Plantarum Specimen from specimens collected in Tasmania.

Four varieties of P. juniperina are accepted by the Australian Plant Census as at October 2020:

- Persoonia juniperina var. brevifolia Meisn.;
- Persoonia juniperina Labill. var. juniperina;
- Persoonia juniperina var. mollis Orchard;
- Persoonia juniperina var. ulicina Meisn.

Within the genus Persoonia, P. juniperina is classified in the lanceolata group, a group of 54 closely related species with similar flowers but very different foliage. These species will often interbreed with each other where two members of the group occur.

== Distribution and habitat ==
Persoonia juniperina is found across Tasmania and from Green Cape on the New South Wales far south coast, south through Victoria and into southeastern South Australia as far west as Adelaide. The habitat is sclerophyll forest and heath to an altitude of 700 m (2,300 ft).

== Ecology ==
A field study manipulating pollination showed P. juniperina was partly self-compatible but cross-pollination led to greater fruit production.
