= John Dallachy =

Australian plant collector born in Britain

John Dallachy (c. 1808 – 4 June 1871) was a curator of Melbourne Botanic Gardens and a plant collector.

Dallachy was born in Elginshire, Scotland. He worked as a gardener for the Earl of Aberdeen and Kew Gardens. In 1847, he went to Ceylon to manage a coffee plantation. Sailing to Australia in 1848, he took up work as a gardener for Jonathan Were in Brighton, Victoria. He was an overseer and later a superintendent of the Melbourne Botanic Gardens from 1849 to 1857. Following the appointment of Ferdinand von Mueller as director, Dallachy continued as curator until 1861.

== Expeditions ==
From 1849 onwards, Dallachy made a number of expeditions (mainly within Victoria) to collect plant specimens. These included:

- c. 1849 Baw Baw region, (Victoria)
- August 1849 Mount Macedon, (Victoria)
- January 1850 Mount Disappointment, (Victoria)
- August 1850 Pentland Hills, (Victoria)
- 1853 Ovens Valley and Mount Buffalo, (Victoria)
- 1858 Wentworth and Mount Murchison, near Wilcannia, (New South Wales)
- 1860 Wimmera River and Lake Hindmarsh, (Victoria)
- 1864–1871 Rockingham Bay, Queensland

His plant specimens are located in National Herbarium of Victoria| (MEL), with duplicates in the herbaria London (BM), Berlin (B), Kiel (KIEL) and Vienna (W).
