= Korobeit =

Korobeit Victoria
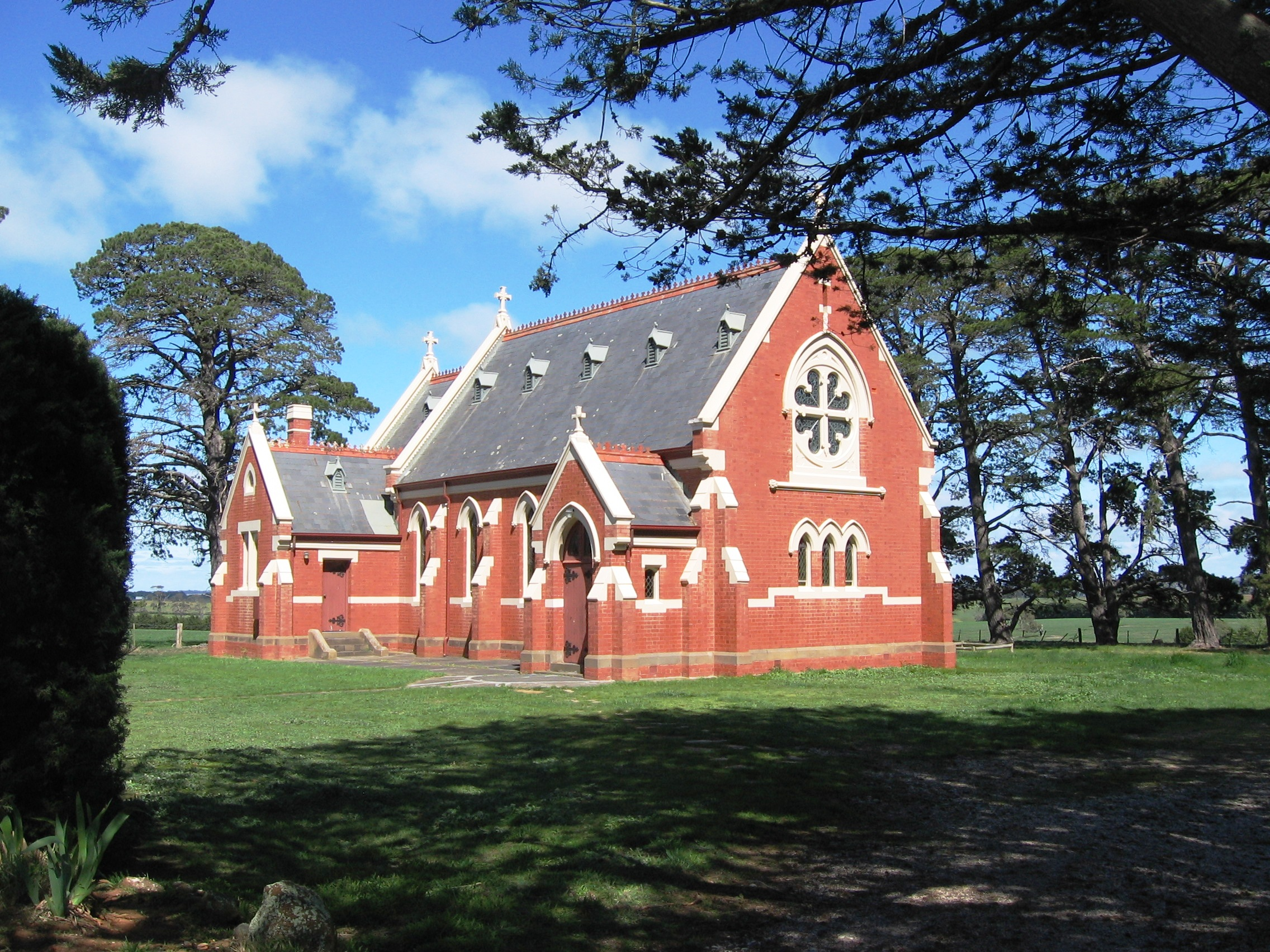
- Our Lady, Help of Christians Roman Catholic church at Korobeit

- Coordinates: 37°35′10″S 144°20′13″E
- Population: 77 (2016 census)
- Postcode(s): 3352
- Location: 74 km (46 mi) NW of Melbourne; 18 km (11 mi) NW of Bacchus Marsh; 5 km (3 mi) N of Myrniong
- LGA(s): Shire of Moorabool
- State electorate(s): Eureka
- Federal division(s): Hawke

Korobeit is a locality in central Victoria, Australia. The locality is in the Shire of Moorabool, 74 kilometres (46 mi) west of the state capital, Melbourne.

At the 2016 census, Korobeit had a population of 77.
