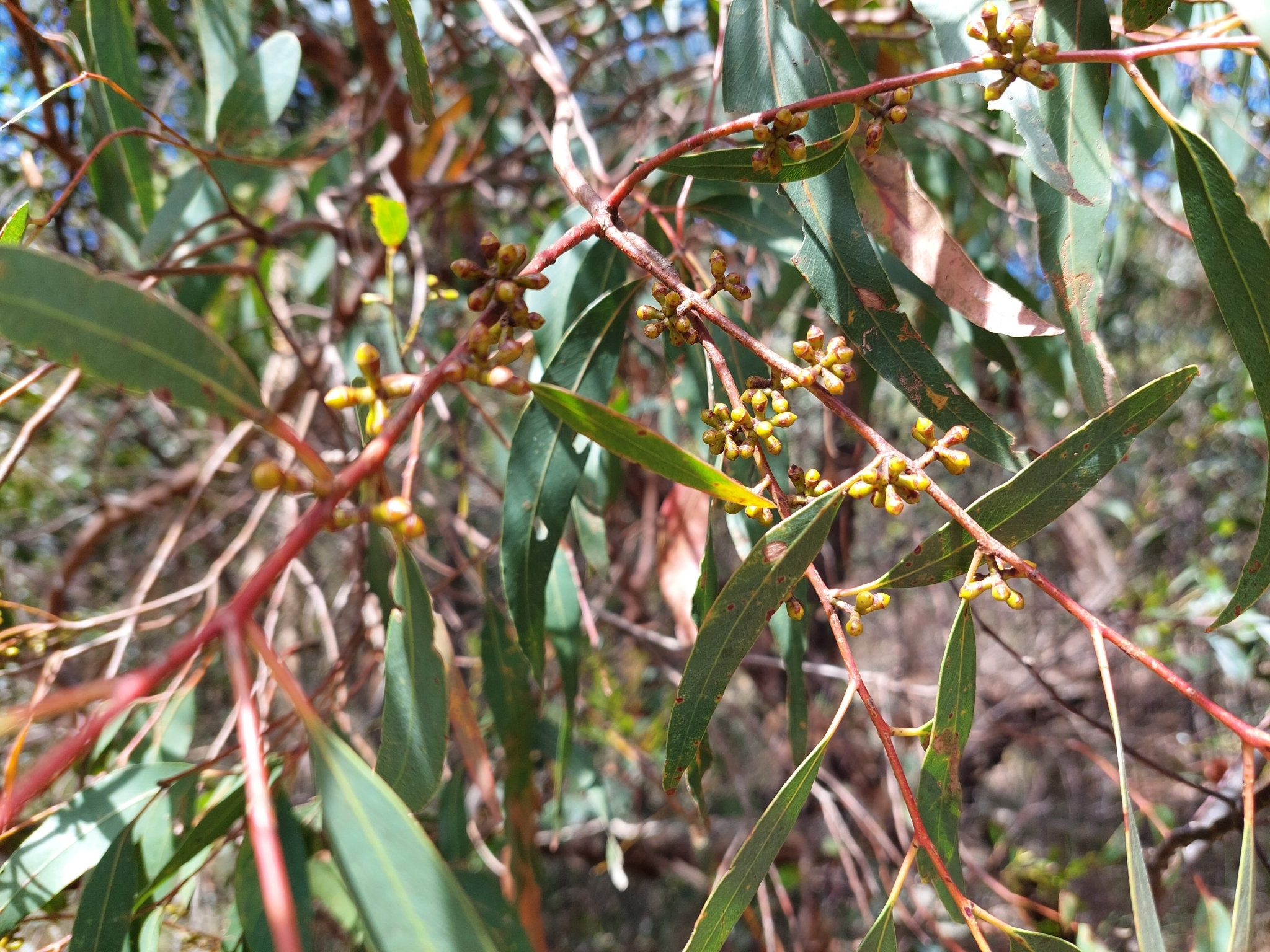

Scientific classification
- Kingdom: Plantae
- Clade: Tracheophytes
- Clade: Angiosperms
- Clade: Eudicots
- Clade: Rosids
- Order: Myrtales
- Family: Myrtaceae
- Genus: Eucalyptus
- Species: E. ignorabilis

Binomial name
- Eucalyptus ignorabilis L.A.S.Johnson & K.D.Hill

= Eucalyptus ignorabilis =

Species of eucalyptus

Eucalyptus ignorabilis is a species of small to medium-sized tree that is endemic to southeastern Australia. It has rough, fibrous bark on the trunk and branches, lance-shaped to curved adult leaves, flower buds in groups of seven, white flowers and cup-shaped to hemispherical fruit. It is found in far southeastern New South Wales and eastern Victoria.

== Description ==
Eucalyptus ignorabilis is a tree that typically grows to a height of 20 m (66 ft) and forms a lignotuber. It has rough, fibrous, spongy bark on the trunk and branches. Young plants have sessile leaves at first, the leaves lance-shaped to oblong or curved, dull green, 28–90 mm (1.1–3.5 in) long and 5–23 mm (0.20–0.91 in) wide. Adult leaves are lance-shaped to curved, 70–200 mm (2.8–7.9 in) long and 10–30 mm (0.39–1.18 in) wide on a petiole 6–27 mm (0.24–1.06 in) long. The flower buds are arranged in leaf axils in groups of seven on an unbranched peduncle 3–10 mm (0.12–0.39 in) long, the individual buds on pedicels 1–3 mm (0.039–0.118 in) long. Mature buds are oval to spindle-shaped, 4–5 mm (0.16–0.20 in) long and 2–3 mm (0.079–0.118 in) wide with a rounded to conical operculum. Flowering has been recorded in January and April and the flowers are white. The fruit is a woody, cup-shaped to hemispherical capsule 3–5 mm (0.12–0.20 in) long and 4–7 mm (0.16–0.28 in) wide with the valves at rim level or slightly protruding.

== Taxonomy and naming ==
Eucalyptus ignorabilis was first described in 1991 by Lawrie Johnson and Ken Hill from a specimen they collected near Seaton in 1986. The description was published in the journal Telopea. The specific epithet is from the Latin ignorabilis, 'unknown', referring to the previous inclusion of this species with E. aromaphloia.

== Distribution and habitat ==
This eucalypt grows in woodland in sandy soil in swampy areas south from the Nadgee Nature Reserve in New South Wales and sporadically as far west as Erica in Victoria.
