= Pentland Hills, Victoria =

Pentland Hills
- Suburb
- Interactive map of Pentland Hills
- Coordinates: 37.657115°S 144.477223°E
- Country: Australia
- State: Victoria
- LGA: Shire of Moorabool

Government
  - State electorate: Eureka
  - Federal division: Hawke

Population
  - Total: 158 (2021 census)
- Postcode: 3341

Pentland Hills is a locality in the Shire of Moorabool, Victoria, Australia. It is located approximately 90 kilometers west of Melbourne. The Post Office at Myrniong opened on 6 September 1858 as Pentland Hills, but was renamed Myrniong in 1872 and closed in 1970. At the 2021 census, Pentland Hills had a population of 158. Christianity was the largest religious group reported overall (51.7%). The Pentland Hills Road is near the Western Highway which runs between Melbourne and Adelaide.
