= Blackwood, Victoria =

Blackwood
- Town
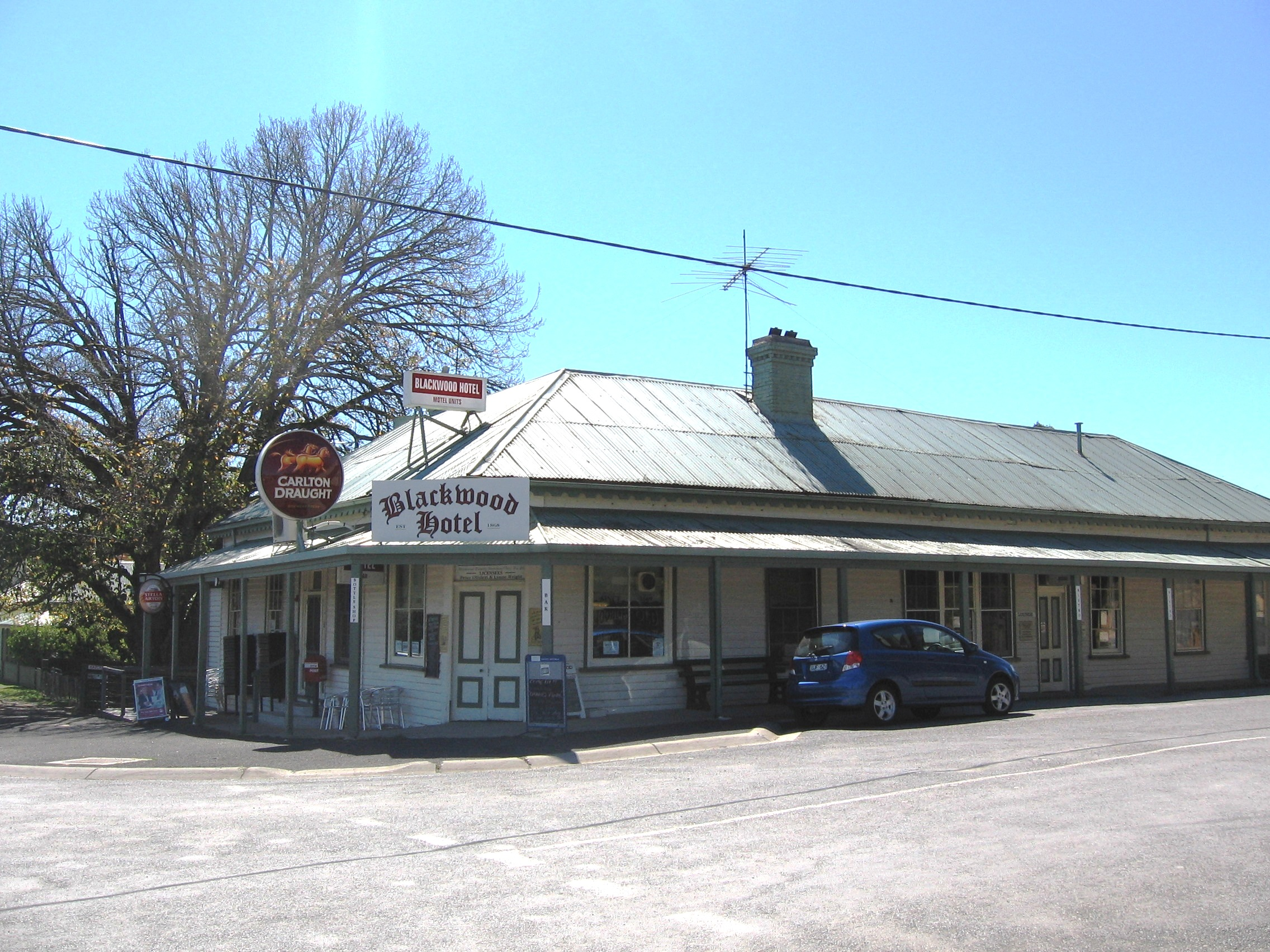
- The Blackwood Hotel, Blackwood.

- Interactive map of Blackwood
- Coordinates: 37°28′S 144°18′E
- Country: Australia
- State: Victoria
- LGA: Shire of Moorabool
- Location: 25 km (16 mi) NW of Bacchus Marsh; 40 km (25 mi) NE of Ballarat; 69 km (43 mi) NW of Melbourne
- Established: 1855

Government
  - State electorate: Macedon
  - Federal division: Hawke
- Elevation: 560 m (1,840 ft)

Population
  - Total: 387 (2021 census)
- Postcode: 3458
- Mean max temp: 44 °C (111 °F)
- Mean min temp: −5 °C (23 °F)
Localities around Blackwood
Bullarto South; Newbury	Barrys Reef	Lerderderg
Blakeville	Blackwood	Greendale
Colbrook; Ballan	Greendale	Dales Creek

Blackwood is a town in Victoria, Australia. The township is located on the Lerderderg River, 89 kilometres north-west of the state capital, Melbourne, within the Wombat State Forest. Blackwood is in the Shire of Moorabool local government area and had a population of 387 at the 2021 census.

== History ==
In 1848 in a list of Crown Lands “beyond the settled districts” at Port Phillip (Western Port District) there were three pastoral runs in the vicinity of Mount Blackwood: 'Cupumnimnip, Mount Blackwood', 15,000 acres, leased by Sir John Lewes (per James Simpson); 'Pentland Hills', 14,000 acres leased by Charles McLachlan; 'Upper Weirriby' (or 'Grey’s old run'), 6,500 acres, leased by Henry Thomas.

Gold was first discovered in what would become Blackwood in November 1854 by two teamsters, Harry Athorn and Harry Hider, who were searching for bullocks that had strayed into the bush. While eating their lunch beside Jackson's Creek "they saw water-worn gold at the bottom of the stream" (at a spot now known as Golden Point).

A miner's cottage in Blackwood.

In March 1855 reports began to appear in the colonial press of a "new gold-field at Mount Blackwood", considered to be an "ample field for profitable employment". By the following July it was reported that the Mount Blackwood diggings were "in a most flourishing state". There were two public houses ("I believe, well conducted") and a theatre in the course of construction, as well as a "horse bazaar by Mr. Waller" ("who seems an enterprising man"). The Government "are building a log prison for the unruly". A Post Office opened at Mount Blackwood in September 1855 (in a building known today as 'Blackwood House') The prospectors at the new goldfield initially searched for alluvial gold, panning the creeks and sluicing the stream-banks and hillsides. Towards the end of 1855 the Mount Blackwood goldfield had an estimated population of 13,000 inhabitants.

When the alluvial gold became harder to find, many of the prospectors turned their attention to digging holes and excavating shafts to search for gold in quartz-reefs. In 1857 John Dickson established the first quartz crushing plant at Mount Blackwood, an enterprise which eventually led to him losing "most of his capital". The population of the Mount Blackwood diggings supported 25 hotels at its peak.

In August 1873 a visitor to the Mount Blackwood diggings observed that "the description of Blackwood as a township is a misnomer, as the place comprises four distinct townships (within a radius of as many miles), of which the Red Hill is the centre". The other three were Golden Point, Barry's Reef and Simmon's Reef. The writer considered Barry's Reef to be "the most important township of the group".

A description of Blackwood published in 1903 in the Australian Handbook contains the following details: "Blackwood is divided into three small townships, named respectively Golden Point, Red Hill, and Simmons’ Reef, all within an area of three miles; of these Red Hill is the leading one". The population was "about 1,050". Local hotels were the Prince of Wales and Cann's Family hotels at Red Hill and the Royal Mail Hotel at Golden Point. The community had a mechanics' institute, a court house, Roman Catholic, Anglican and Wesleyan churches, Rechabites and Oddfellows' lodges and a State school at Golden Point. Quartz mining and sawmilling were the main local industries, and a mineral spring was "growing in favour with invalids".

The Mount Blackwood post office closed in 1921. In February 1926 an article describing a trip to "the picturesque old township of Blackwood" claimed that "its mineral springs, mountain grandeur, and picnicking grounds are becoming immensely popular". In 1929 the number of people eligible to vote in the Blackwood district was 102.

== Attractions ==
Attractions for tourists and visitors include outdoor activities such as bushwalking and camping in the Lerderderg State Park and Wombat State Forest.

The mineral springs at Blackwood are located on the banks of the Lerderderg River. There is an outlet on the car-park side, and another on the opposite side accessed by a footbridge. The mineral springs are the starting point for walking tracks leading to Sweet's Lookout and Shaw's Lake.

The nearby Mount Blackwood is an extinct volcano with a prominent scoria dome built on lava flows extending eight kilometres to the south. The summit, with several communication towers, is a public reserve accessible from a gate on Lohs Lane, off Mount Blackwood Road. On clear days the summit offers panoramic views of the surrounding area, including a view of Melbourne and its north-western suburbs.

Wheeler's Tramway on Mount Wilson (accessible via Lerderderg Road) is a “comparatively intact example of a log tramway formation” of historical and archaeological significance. It was constructed in about 1878 by James Wheeler to provide logs for his sawmill on the Lerderderg River. The tramway extends about 800 metres along a creek and features “well preserved impressions of foundation timbers, a short siding and a rock-cut ledge to accommodate the log line”. The structure was abandoned when the sawmill closed in 1898. Wheeler's Tramway is listed on the Victorian Heritage Register.

The Garden of St Erth at Simmon's Reef is a collection of mostly exotic trees and plants on a six-acre site, opened in 1981 by Tommy Garnett, a retired headmaster and plant enthusiast. It includes a miner's cottage dating from the heyday of the diggings. Since 2011 The Garden of St Erth has been owned and managed by The Diggers Foundation.

The annual Easter Carnival & Wood Chop is a popular annual event. It is held annually on Easter Saturday.

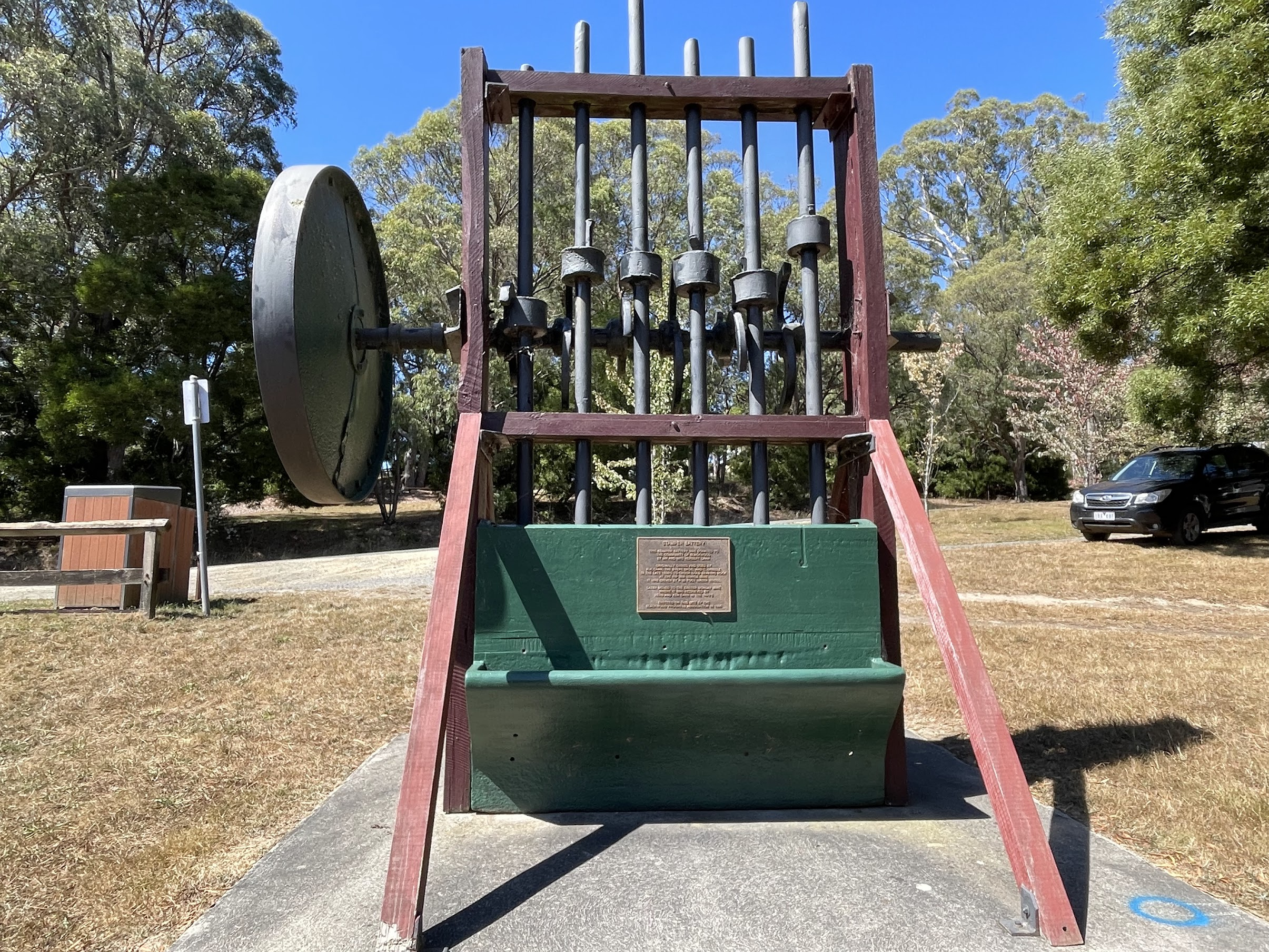
Blackwood features a 19th century stamp battery which has been put on display, once used in the Rip Van Winkle mine and driven by a thirty foot water wheel.
