= Lerderderg State Park =

Protected area in Victoria, Australia

- IUCN category II (national park)
- Location within Victoria
- Location: Victoria
- Nearest city: Blackwood
- Coordinates: 37°32′S 144°24′E
- Area: 142.5 km^{2} (55.0 sq mi)
- Governing body: Parks Victoria
- Website: Official website

Lerderderg State Park (incorporating the former Pyrete State Forest) is a 14,250-hectare park located between Bacchus Marsh and Blackwood, an hour's drive from Melbourne, Australia. The park is part of an Aboriginal cultural landscape in the traditional country of the Wurundjeri People. There are several maintained tracks for walking through the park and camping is allowed.

The park is named for the Lerderderg River which has cut the 300-metre-deep Lerderderg Gorge through sandstone and slate, almost bisecting the park.

Parks Victoria maintains six designated walks: three short walks of 3.5 km or less; Blackwood-O'Briens Crossing and return (22 km); O'Briens Crossing-Cowan Track loop (14 km); and the overnight walk O'Briens Crossing to Mackenzies Flat (20 km).

In addition, one leg of the Great Dividing Trail, the Lerderderg Track, passes through the park, entering from Blackwood in the park's northwest, and exiting south towards Bacchus Marsh. Bicycles are prohibited from one section of this track, due to a conservation area.

== See also ==
- Lerderderg Gorge
- Lerderderg River
- Lerderderg River diversion tunnel
- Wombat State Forest
