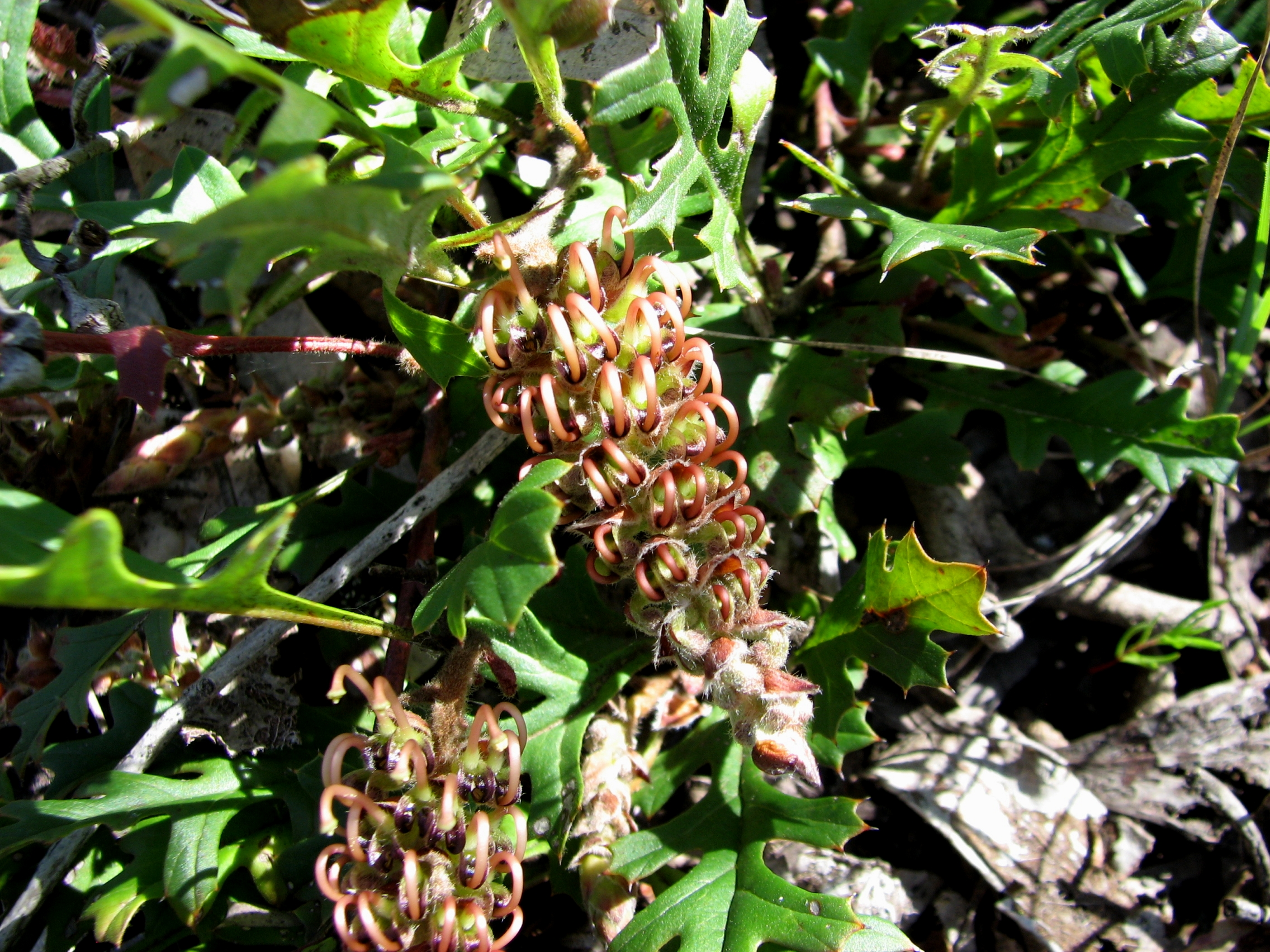
- In Castlemaine Diggings National Heritage Park

Scientific classification
- Kingdom: Plantae
- Clade: Tracheophytes
- Clade: Angiosperms
- Clade: Eudicots
- Order: Proteales
- Family: Proteaceae
- Genus: Grevillea
- Species: G. obtecta

Binomial name
- Grevillea obtecta Molyneux

= Grevillea obtecta =

Fryerstown grevillea

Species of shrub endemic to Victoria, Australia

Grevillea obtecta, commonly known as Fryerstown grevillea, Elphinstone grevillea or Taradale grevillea, is a species of flowering plant in the family Proteaceae and is endemic to Victoria in Australia. It is a prostrate, clumping or straggling shrub with pinnatifid, pinnatipartite or toothed leaves, and toothbrush-like clusters of light green to yellowish and purplish to black flowers with a dull yellow to pink style.

== Description ==
Grevillea obtecta is a prostrate, clumping or straggling shrub that typically grows up to 0.5 m (1 ft 8 in) high, 1.2 m (3 ft 11 in) wide and has shaggy- to woolly-hairy branchlets. The leaves are usually egg-shaped to oblong in outline, 20–180 mm (0.79–7.09 in) long, 20–60 mm (0.79–2.36 in) wide and pinnatifid or pinnatipartite with 2 to 21 lobes, or toothed, the end lobes or teeth triangular to narrowly egg-shaped and sometimes sharply-pointed, 5–30 mm (0.20–1.18 in) long and 2–15 mm (0.079–0.591 in) wide. The flowers are arranged in toothbrush-like clusters on a rachis 35–60 mm (1.4–2.4 in) long and are light green to yellowish on the outside and purplish to black inside with a dull yellow to pink style, the pistil 12–16 mm (0.47–0.63 in) long. Flowering occurs from August to November and the fruit is a silky-hairy follicle 10–12 mm (0.39–0.47 in) long.

== Taxonomy ==
Grevillea obtecta was first formally described in 1985 by Bill Molyneux in the journal Muelleria from specimens collected near Taradale in 1977. The specific epithet (obtecta) means "covered over" or "protected", referring to the large bracts that cover and protect the immature flowers.

== Distribution and habitat ==
Fryerstown grevillea occurs in dry sclerophyll forest between Fryerstown and the north of Daylesford. It is found on the south faces of gravelly slopes.

== Conservation status ==
This species is listed as "endangered" under the Victorian Government Flora and Fauna Guarantee Act 1988 and as "Rare in Victoria" on the Department of Sustainability and Environment's Advisory List of Rare Or Threatened Plants In Victoria.
