= List of conflicts in Australia =

List of conflicts in Australia is a timeline of events that includes wars, battles, rebellions, skirmishes, massacres, riots, and other related events that have occurred in the country of Australia's current geographical area, both before and after federation.

Conflicts fought between Indigenous Australians and European settlers are known collectively by some historians as the Australian frontier wars.

== 17th century ==
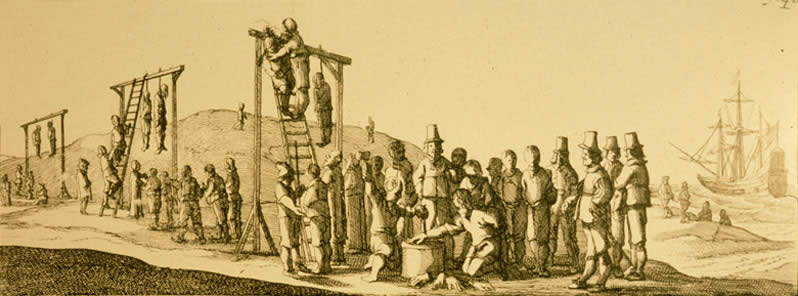
The hangings on Long Island as illustrated in the Lucas de Vries 1649 edition of Ongeluckige Voyagie.

- 1629: The Dutch East India Company sailing ship Batavia struck a reef near Beacon Island off the Western Australian coast. A subsequent mutiny and massacre took place among the survivors.

== 18th century ==
- 1788: Bloody Point
- 1790–1800: Sydney Cove War
- 1790–1816: Hawkesbury and Nepean Wars
  - 1790–1802: Pemulwuy's War
    - 1794: Battle of Toongabbie
    - 1795: Battle of Richmond Hill
    - 1797: Battle of Parramatta
  - 1799–1805: Black Wars
  - 1802–1810: Tedbury's War
    - 1809: Battle of Bond's Farm
  - 1814–1816: Hawkesbury Nepean War
    - 1816: Battle of Appin
    - 1816: Battle of the Nepean
    - 1816: Nepean Campaign

== 19th century ==
- 1804: Castle Hill convict rebellion (also called Battle of Vinegar Hill)
- 1808–1810: Rum Rebellion
- 1816: Appin massacre
- 1816: Battle at Razorback
- 1821–1827: Bathurst Wars
- 1818: Minnamurra River massacre
- 1824: Bathurst War
  - 1824: Battle of Bathurst/Wiradjuri War
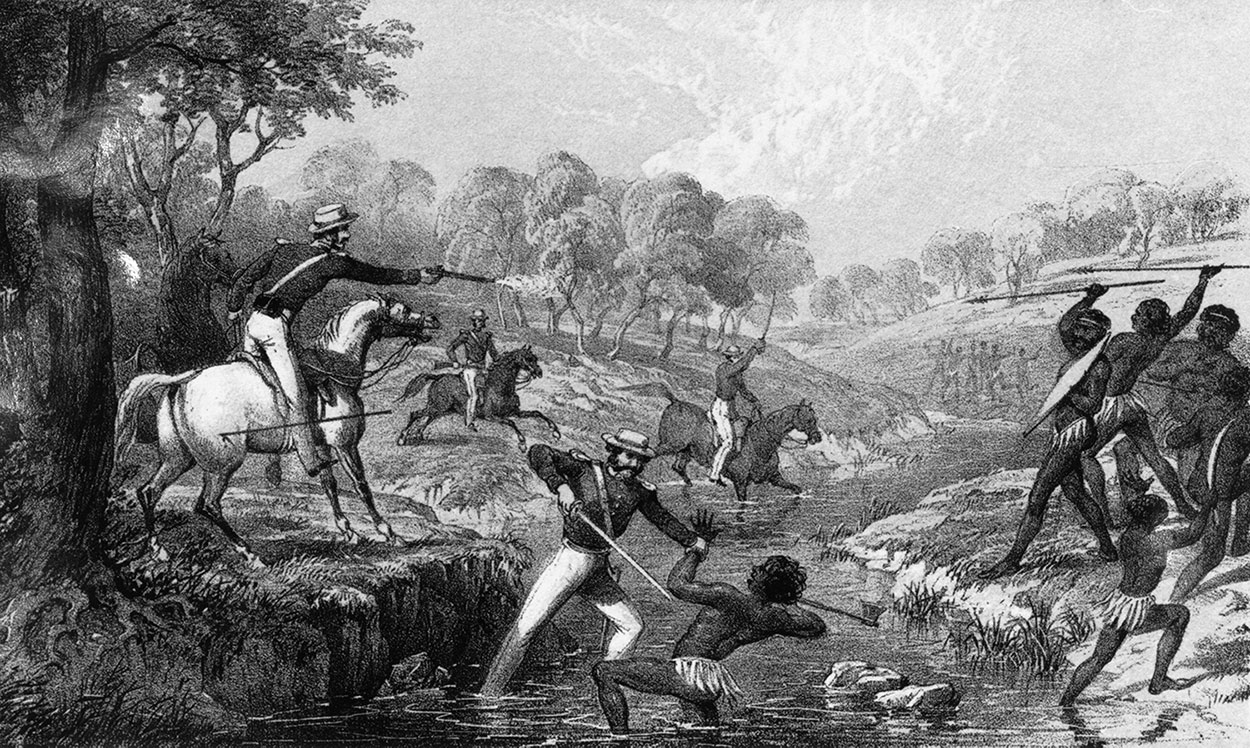
    Mounted police engaging Indigenous Australians during the Slaughterhouse Creek massacre of 1838
- 1826: 1826 Norfolk Island Convict Rebellion
- 1827–1828: Corn Field Raids of 1827-1828
- 1828: Cape Grim massacre
- 1828–1832: Black War
- 1829: Cyprus mutiny
- 1830s–1840s: Wiradjuri Wars
- 1830s: Warrowen massacre
- 1830: Bathurst Rebellion
- 1830–1850: The Port Phillip District Wars
  - 1833 or 1834: Convincing Ground massacre
  - 1836: Mount Cottrell massacre
  - 1838: Battle of Broken River
  - 1839: Campaspe Plains massacre
  - 1839: Blood Hole massacre
  - 1840–1850: Gippsland massacres
- 1831–1833: Yagan Resistance
- 1832-1833 Moreton Bay conflict
- 1834: 1834 Norfolk Island Convict Rebellion
- 1834–1849 or 1860s: The Eumeralla Wars
- 1834: Battle of Pinjarra
- 1836: Mount Dispersion massacre
- 1838: The Waterloo Plains massacre
- 1838: Waterloo Creek massacre
- 1838–1841: Wiradjuri Wars
- 1838: Myall Creek massacre
- 1838: Waterloo Plains massacre
- 1839: Murdering Gully massacre
- 1840: Battle of Yering
- 1840: Fighting Hills massacre
- 1840: Fighting Waterholes massacre
- 1840: Shipwreck survivors of the Maria massacred
- 1841: Wonnerup massacre
- 1841: The Rufus River massacre
- 1842–1852: Mandandanji Land War
- 1842: 1842 Norfolk Island Convict Rebellion
- 1842: Pelican Creek tragedy
- 1842: Evans Head massacre
- 1843: Warrigal Creek massacre
- 1843: Battle of One Tree Hill (also called Battle of Meewah)
- 1843–1855: War of Southern Queensland
- 1844–1845: Port Augusta War
- 1840–1850: Gippsland massacres
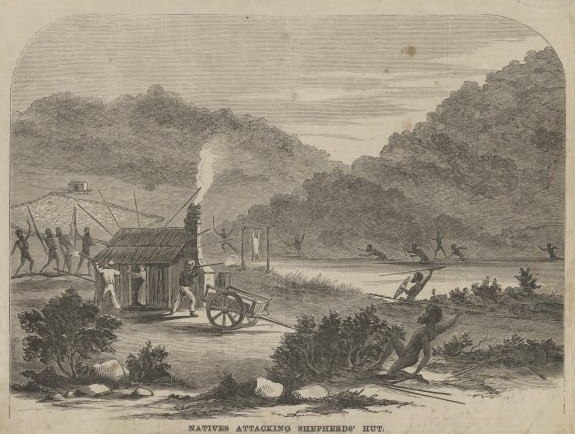
  A group of Indigenous Australians attacking a shepherds hut
- 1845: Darkey Flat Massacre
- 1846: Cooking Pot Uprising
- 1846: Blanket Bay massacre
- 1848: Avenue Range Station massacre
- 1849: Waterloo Bay massacre
- 1851–1854: Eureka Rebellion
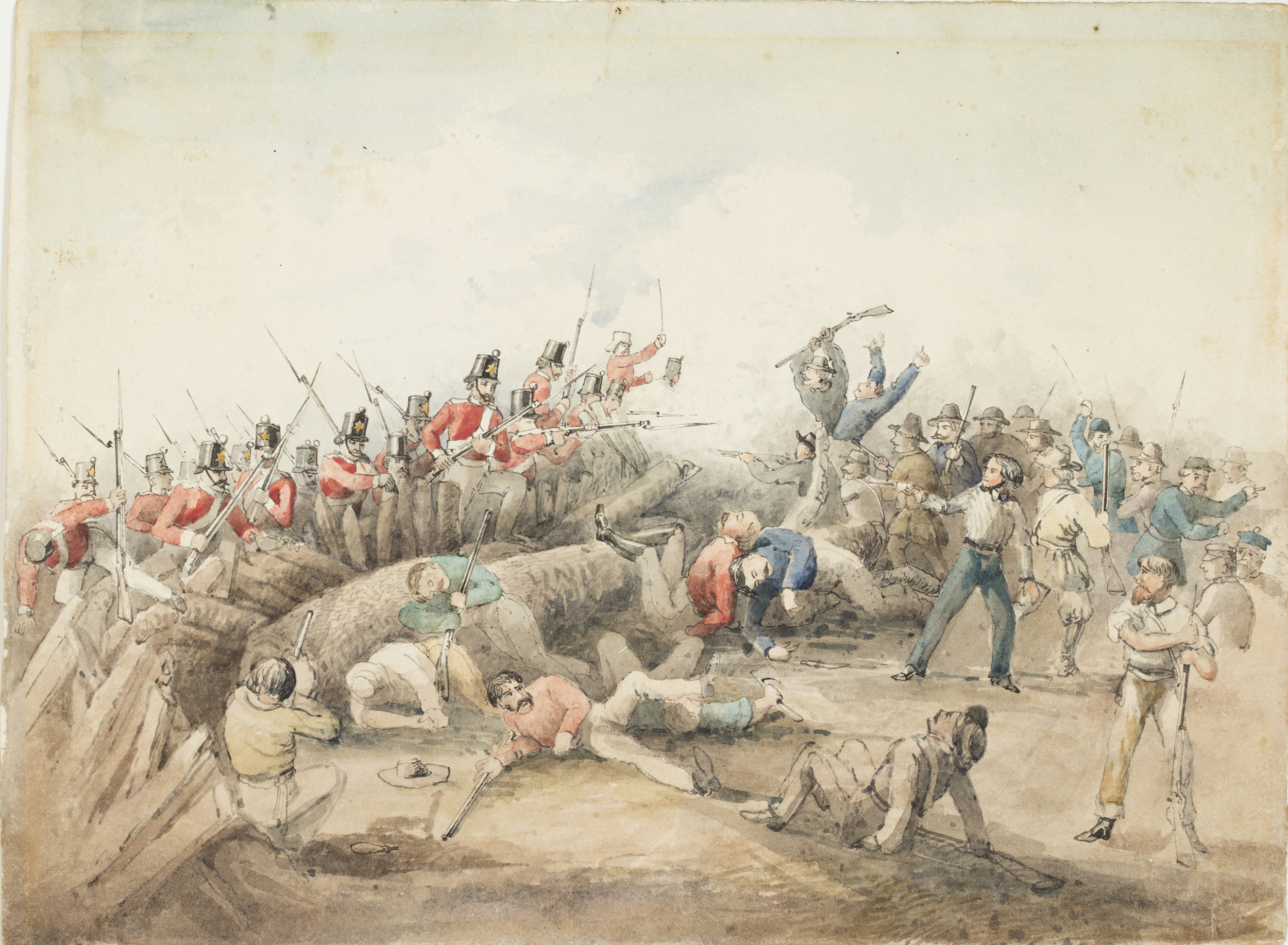
  Eureka Stockade Riot. J. B. Henderson (1854) watercolour
  - 1851: Forest Creek Monster Meeting
  - 1853: Anti-Gold Licence Association
  - 1853: Bendigo Petition
  - 1854: Ballarat Reform League
  - 1854: Battle of Eureka Stockade
- 1853: East Ballina massacre
- 1857: Hornet Bank massacre
- 1857: Buckland riot
- 1857–1858: Massacre of the Yeeman
- 1859: Hospital Creek Massacre
- 1860–1861: Lambing Flat Riots
- 1861: Battle of Yindurupilly
- 1861: Cullin-La-Ringo massacre
- 1864: Battle of the Mitchell
- 1865: La Grange expedition
- 1867: Goulbolba Hill massacre
- 1868: Flying Foam Massacre
- 1869: Battle of Minderoo
- 1870–1890: Kalkadoon Wars
  - 1884: Battle of Battle Mountain
- 1873: Battle Camp massacre
- 1874–1875: Blackfellow's Creek massacre
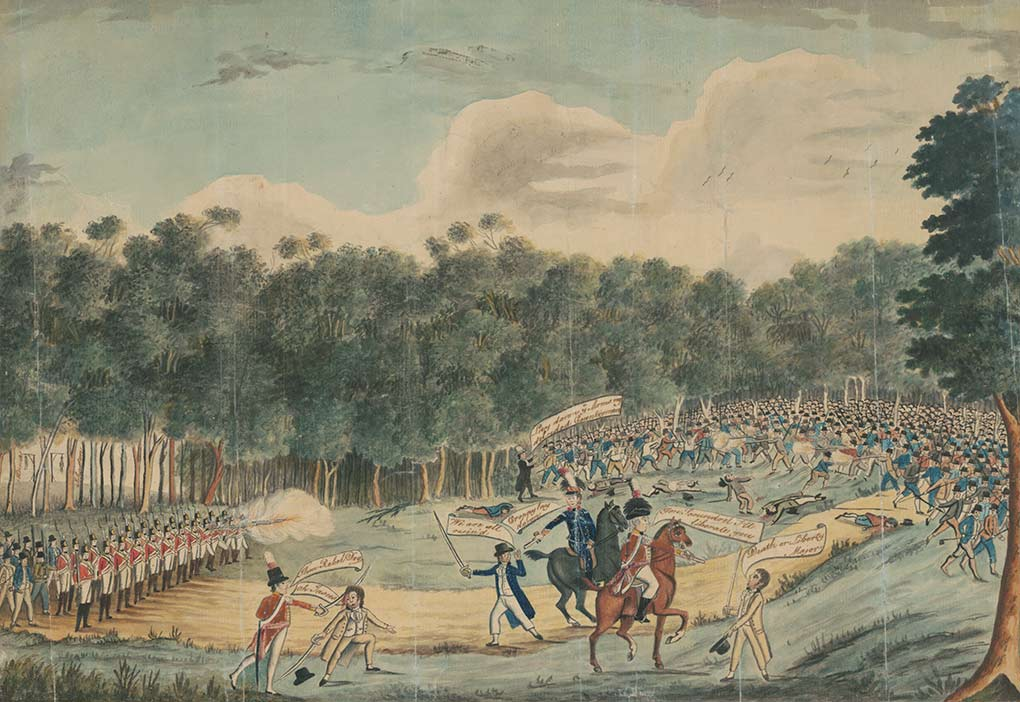
  An illustration depicting the Castle Hill convict rebellion
- 1874: Barrow Creek massacre
- 1875: Massacre of Running Waters
- 1877 'Showdown on the Bridge' in Branxholm
- 1879: Cape Bedford massacre
- 1880s: Koonchera Point massacre
- 1880s–1890s: Arnhem Wars
- 1890: Speewah massacre
- 1891: Australian shearers' strike
- 1894–1897: Jandamarra Guerilla War

== 20th century ==
- 1901: The Battle of Racecourse Hill
- 1911: Gan Gan massacre
- 1914–1918: First World War
  - 1914: Battle of Cocos
- 1915: Battle of Broken Hill
- 1915: Mistake Creek massacre
- 1916: Mowla Bluff massacre
- 1916: Liverpool riot
- 1917: Raid on the Queensland Government Printing Office
- 1918: Darwin rebellion
- 1919: Red Flag riots
- 1919: Battle of the Barricades
- 1919: HMAS Australia mutiny
- 1920: Broome race riots
- 1922: Sturt Creek massacre
- 1923: Victorian Police strike
- 1924: Bedford Downs massacre
- 1926: Forrest River massacre
- 1928: Coniston massacre
- 1929: Rothbury riot
- 1932: Emu War
- 1932–1934: Caledon Bay crisis

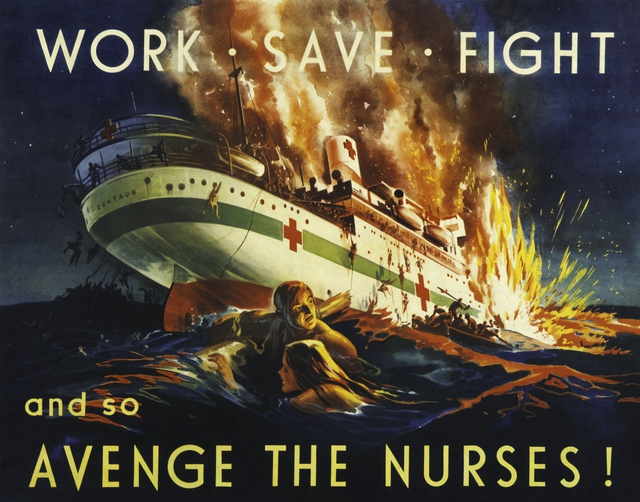
A propaganda poster calling for Australians to avenge the sinking of Centaur

- 1939–1945: Second World War
  - Axis naval activity in Australian waters
    - 1941: Sinking of HMS Sydney
    - 1942: Attack on Sydney Harbour
    - 1942: Shelling of Newcastle
    - 1942: Attack on the Dureenbee
    - 1943: Shelling of Port Gregory
    - 1943: Sinking of AHS Centaur
    - 1943: Convoy GP55
    - 1944: German submarine U-862
  - Air raids on Australia, 1942–43
    - 1942–1945: North Western Area Campaign
    - 1942: Bombing of Darwin
    - 1942: Attack on Broome
    - 1942: MV Koolama sinking
    - 1943: Raid on Darwin (2 May 1943)
  - 1942: Townsville mutiny
  - 1942: Battle of Brisbane
  - 1944: Cowra Breakout
- 1979: Star Hotel riot
- 1984: Milperra massacre
- 1987: Brewarrina riot
- 1988: Fremantle Prison riot
- 1989: Four Clubs–Mongrel Mob War
- 1996: Parliament House riot

== 21st century ==
- 2004: Redfern riots
- 2005: Cronulla riots
- 2005: Macquarie Fields riots
- 2012: Sydney anti-Islam film protests
- 2020: COVID-19 protests in Australia

== See also ==
- Military history of Australia
- History of Australia
- Australian frontier wars
- List of massacres of Indigenous Australians
