= List of places of worship in Hepburn Shire =

This is a list of places of worship in the Shire of Hepburn, a local government area in the state of Victoria, Australia. The list includes active and former churches and other religious buildings representing a variety of Christian denominations and other faiths.

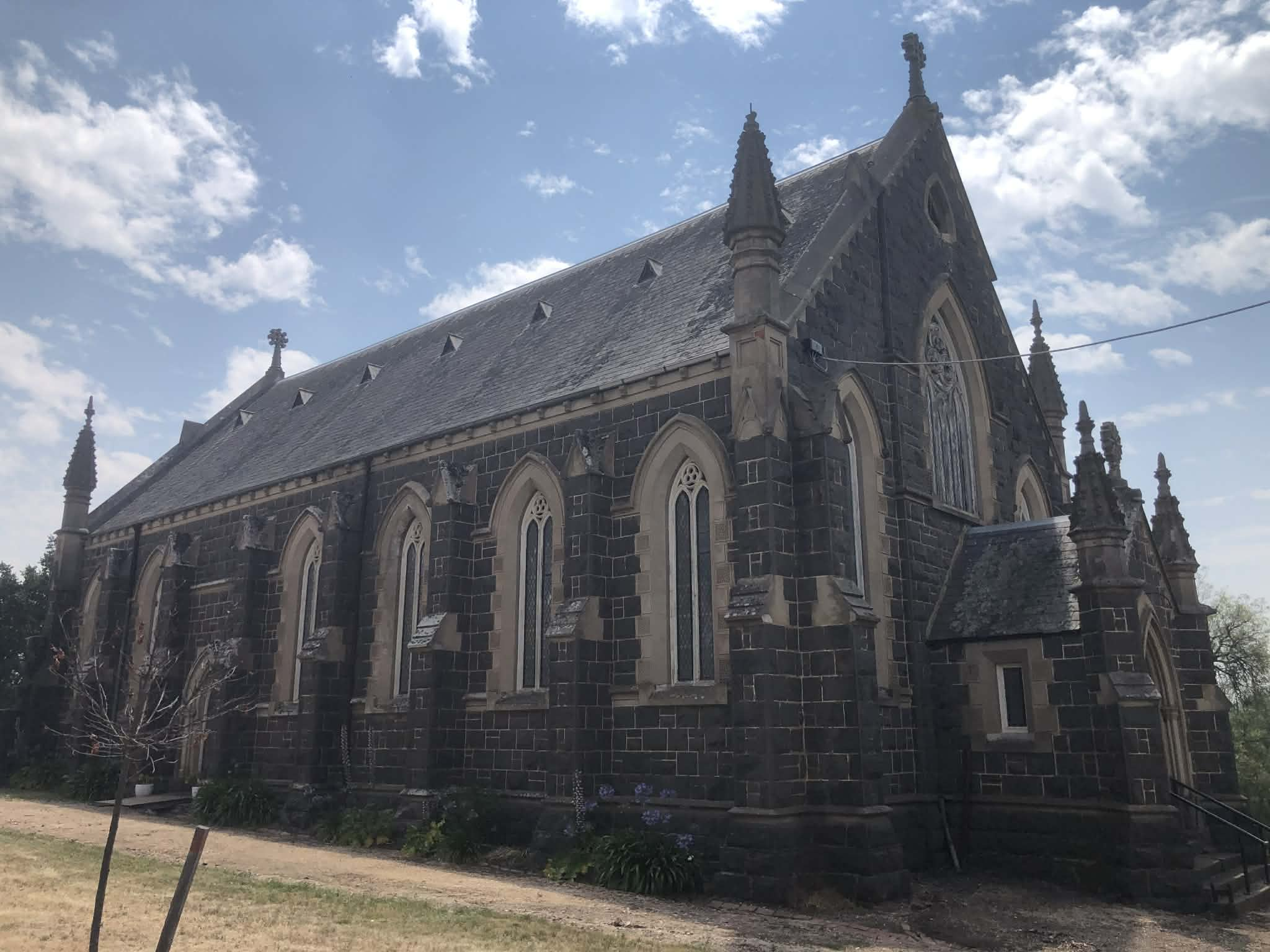
St Paul's Anglican Church, Clunes

== Heritage listing status ==
Style	Status
Yes	Listed on the Victorian Heritage Register
–	Not listed

== Current places of worship ==
Current places of worship
Name	Image	Location	Denomination/ Affiliation	Heritage listing	Notes	Refs
Christ Church, Daylesford		Daylesford; 37.344327°S 144.145714°E	Anglican	Yes		
St Peter's Catholic Church, Daylesford		Daylesford; 37.343374°S 144.144638°E	Catholic	Yes		
Daylesford Community Church		Daylesford; 37.342572°S 144.145148°E	Baptist	–		
St John's Anglican Church, Creswick		Creswick; 37.426860°S 143.891676°E	Anglican	Yes		
St Paul's Anglican Church, Clunes		Clunes; 37.294299°S 143.783340°E	Anglican	Yes		
St Augustine's Catholic Church, Creswick		Creswick; 37.427757°S 143.891924°E	Catholic	Yes		
Mount Prospect Presbyterian Church		Newlyn North; 37.378905°S 144.017869°E	Presbyterian	–		
St Andrew's Presbyterian Church, Smeaton		Smeaton; 37.318575°S 143.948417°E	Presbyterian	–		
St Matthew's Anglican Church, Newlyn North		Newlyn North; 37.402839°S 143.995863°E	Anglican	–		
St Andrew's Uniting Church, Creswick		Creswick; 37.428797°S 143.894515°E	Uniting (formerly Presbyterian)	–		
St Mary Magdalen's Church, Trentham		Trentham; 37.389167°S 144.327462°E	Catholic	–		
St George's Anglican Church, Trentham		Trentham; 37.388779°S 144.323968°E	Anglican	–		
St Naum Ohridski Macedonian Orthodox Church		Rocklyn; 37.433219°S 144.049723°E	Macedonian Orthodox	–		

== Former places of worship ==
Former places of worship
Name	Image	Location	Denomination/ Affiliation	Heritage listing	Notes	Refs
Daylesford Uniting Church		Daylesford; 37.344027°S 144.144109°E	Uniting (formerly Wesleyan Methodist)	Yes		
St Andrew's Presbyterian Church, Daylesford		Daylesford; 37.343091°S 144.145752°E	Presbyterian	Yes		
St Francis Xavier Catholic Chapel		Eganstown; 37.357805°S 144.081484°E	Catholic	Yes		
Holy Trinity Anglican Church, Kingston		Kingston; 37.372402°S 143.955013°E	Anglican	Yes		
Kingston Methodist Church		Kingston; 37.376574°S 143.954725°E	Methodist	Yes		
Clunes Primitive Methodist Church		Clunes; 37.296643°S 143.785994°E	Primitive Methodist	Yes		
Clunes Wesleyan Methodist Church		Clunes; 37.295442°S 143.785558°E	Wesleyan Methodist	Yes		
St Andrew's Uniting Church, Clunes		Clunes; 37.295751°S 143.784969°E	Uniting (formerly Presbyterian)	–		
St Thomas Aquinas' Catholic Church, Clunes		Clunes; 37.294379°S 143.784739°E	Catholic	Yes		
Scrub Hill Uniting Church		Newlyn; 37.431995°S 143.973627°E	Uniting (formerly Presbyterian)	–		
Newlyn Wesleyan Methodist Church		Newlyn; 37.406820°S 144.012263°E	Wesleyan Methodist	Yes		
St Joseph's Catholic Church, Blampied		Blampied; 37.365712°S 144.046022°E	Catholic	Yes		
Little Hampton Uniting Church		Little Hampton; 37.360423°S 144.293841°E	Uniting (formerly Methodist)	–		
St Peter's Anglican Church, Mollongghip		Mollongghip; 37.473416°S 144.027514°E	Anglican	–		
Bullarto Uniting Church		Bullarto; 37.404770°S 144.217992°E	Uniting (formerly Methodist)	–		
Lyonville Catholic Church		Lyonville; 37.389628°S 144.261493°E	Catholic	–		
Lyonville Wesleyan Methodist Church		Lyonville; 37.389839°S 144.259384°E	Wesleyan Methodist	–		
Lyonville Anglican Church		Lyonville; 37.392649°S 144.258987°E	Anglican	Non-existent		
St John's Anglican Church, Glenlyon		Glenlyon; 37.298520°S 144.240604°E	Anglican	–		
St Paul's Catholic Church, Glenlyon		Glenlyon; 37.297142°S 144.238391°E	Catholic	–		
Creswick Methodist Church		Creswick; 37.412604°S 143.890744°E	Methodist (Primitive Methodist)	Yes		
St Matthew's Anglican Church, Hepburn Springs		Hepburn Springs; 37.313709°S 144.139182°E	Anglican	–		
Hepburn Springs Christian Church		Hepburn Springs; 37.315137°S 144.137946°E	Pentecostal	–		
St Andrew's Uniting Church, Trentham		Trentham; 37.390652°S 144.323060°E	Uniting (formerly Presbyterian)	–		
Sacred Heart Catholic Church, Trentham East		Trentham East; 37.384583°S 144.384238°E	Catholic	–		
Franklinford Methodist Church		Franklinford; 37.236431°S 144.113637°E	Methodist	–		
Franklinford Presbyterian Church		Franklinford; 37.237130°S 144.113303°E	Presbyterian	–		
St Mark's Anglican Church, Spring Hill		Spring Hill; 37.301284°S 144.337765°E	Anglican	–		
Clydesdale Methodist Church		Clydesdale; 37.175923°S 144.088323°E	Methodist	–		
Yandoit Uniting Church		Yandoit; 37.218275°S 144.089945°E	Uniting (formerly Methodist)	–		
St John the Baptist Catholic Church, Yandoit (Yandoit Catholic Church)		Yandoit; 37.204902°S 144.086995°E	Catholic	–		
Holy Trinity Anglican Church, Yandoit		Yandoit; 37.207084°S 144.088335°E	Anglican	–		
Kooroocheang Methodist Church		Kooroocheang; 37.286640°S 144.029067°E	Methodist	–		

== See also ==
- List of places of worship in Golden Plains Shire
- List of places of worship in the City of Greater Geelong
