= Port Phillip District Wars =

1830–1850 conflicts in Victoria, Australia

Date	1830–50
Location	Port Phillip District, Victoria (now the state of Victoria)
Result	European occupation of the district

Belligerents
(United Kingdom) Colony of New South Wales; European settlers	Aboriginal Australians: Gunditjmara; Dja Dja Wurrung; Taungurung; Wathaurong

Units involved
New South Wales Mounted Police; Border Police of New South Wales; Native Police	

The Port Phillip District Wars is a name given to a series of violent encounters between European settlers and Aboriginal Australians in the Port Phillip District, the area governed by the colony of New South Wales from 1836 before becoming the colony of Victoria on 1 July 1851, and including a short period before this (1830–1850).

Various Aboriginal groups were involved, including members of the Gunditjmara, Dja Dja Wurrung, Taungurung, and Wathaurong peoples. The colonial combatants included the New South Wales Mounted Police, Border Police of New South Wales, Native Police, and other settlers in the region.

The Port Phillip District Wars included the Eumeralla Wars, the long period of wars between British colonists and Gunditjmara people in what is now called the Western District of Victoria, which included the Convincing Ground massacre, as well as a number of other incidents and conflicts, including:

- Battle of Broken River
- Campaspe Plains massacre
- Blood Hole massacre
- Gippsland massacres
- Mount Cottrell massacre
