= Murder of Hannah McGuire =

2024 murder

Hannah McGuire
- Died: April 2024; Ballarat, Victoria
- Body discovered: Scarsdale, Victoria
- Known for: Murder victim

Hannah McGuire was a 23-year old Australian woman who was murdered on or about 5 April 2024. Her ex-partner, Lachlan Young, was accused and subsequently pleaded guilty to her murder. Her body was discovered inside her burnt-out vehicle near Scarsdale, Victoria, which Young set on fire with her body inside. Young initially admitted to killing McGuire and disposing of her body. An offer to plead guilty to manslaughter was rejected by the prosecution. A court heard Young planned to crash McGuire's car with her inside, unconscious at the wheel because she was planning to end their relationship and take their property.

== Background ==
Hannah McGuire, aged 23, was from Clunes, Victoria. Her ex-partner, Lachlan Young, was the same age and described at trial by McGuire's parents as a problem drinker who "did not treat their daughter well".

== Murder and aftermath ==
Young admitted to killing McGuire and disposing of her body in bushland. The court heard he had planned to crash Ms McGuire's car with her inside, unconscious, at the wheel, "because she was leaving him and she was going to take the house and other things".

== Trial ==
The murder trial of Young commenced in the Supreme Court of Victoria in Ballarat on 9 July 2025 and was expected to last five weeks. Young initially pleaded not guilty to murder, after his offer to plead guilty to manslaughter was rejected by the prosecution. While he admitted to killing McGuire and dumping her body, he initially denied acting with murderous intent.

On the eighth day of the trial, Young was re-arraigned and entered a plea of guilty to the murder of McGuire. Young is scheduled to return to court on 25 July 2025 for a mention ahead of a plea hearing.

On 18 November 2025, Young was sentenced to 28 years in prison, with a non-parole period of 22 years, for the murder. He will be eligible for parole in 2046.
