= Mount Franklin (Victoria) =

Mountain in Victoria, Australia

Mount Franklin (Willambeparamal)
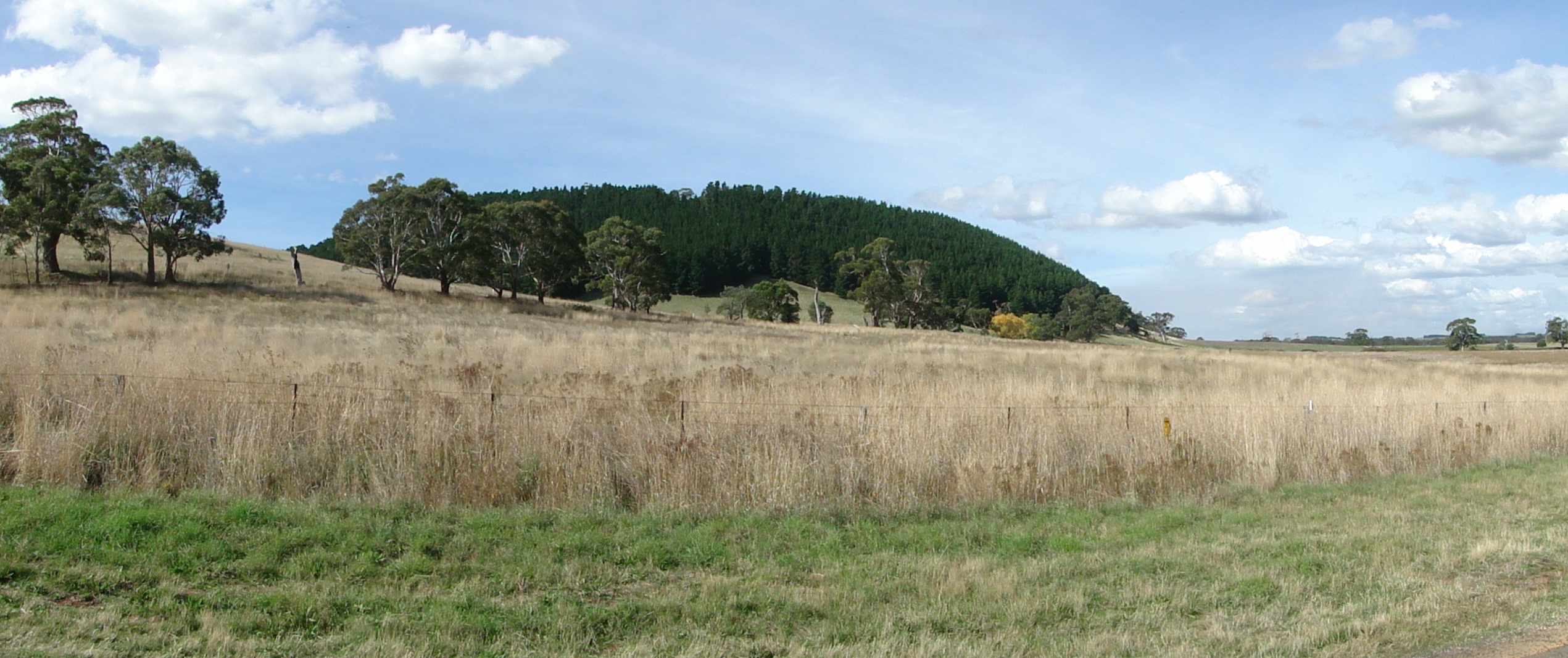
- View from Highway

Highest point
- Elevation: 648 metres (2,126 ft)
- Prominence: 270 m (890 ft)
- Coordinates: 37°15′54″S 144°09′02″E

Geography
- Location within Victoria
- Location: Victoria, Australia

Mount Franklin (Djadjawurrung: Willambeparamal) is an extinct volcano about 10 km north of Daylesford and 4.6 km south east of Franklinford in Victoria, Australia. A road spirals round the outside slopes covered with pine trees, into a flat 50 acre caldera, and onto the rim which hosts a fire lookout, parking area and picnic ground.

The flat summit area is now used as a free camping ground. A central lawn area is surrounded by a ring of campsites, with picnic tables and wood fire barbecues. There is space for tents, and to park caravans and RVs. A toilet block and water tank (non-potable) is located close to the entrance.

Being a prominent local landmark within Hepburn Shire, the mountain is included within the boundaries of the Mount Franklin Reserve managed by Parks Victoria.

== History ==
The mountain was created by a volcanic eruption about 470,000 years ago. It is fine example of a breached scoria cone. The breach in the south eastern rim (through which the road now enters) is thought to have been caused by lava flow breaking through the rim. The caldera is one of the deepest in the central highlands area. It is not active. Earlier flows extend to the north and west. The coarse ejecta exposed around the summit includes red and green olivine and megacrysts of high-temperature (some of the largest known Victorian examples) and orthoclase (to 7 cm long) and augite (over 9 cm long). Lumps of Ordovician sedimentary and granitic bedrock also occur in the ejecta and small basalt blocks contain cores of crazed quartz. On the western slope is the parasitic scoria mound known as "Lady Franklin".

The volcanic eruptions may have been witnessed by members of the Dja Dja Wurrung native Aboriginal tribe who called this country the ‘smoking grounds’. The clan that occupied the country around Mount Franklin were the Gunangara Gundidj who called it Willambeparamal meaning home of the emus. Mount Franklin and the surrounding area appears to have been a place of considerable religious significance to Aboriginal people. Both ethnographical and archaeological evidence indicates that frequent large ceremonial gatherings took place in the area. Lava from Mount Franklin and other volcanoes in the area filled valleys and buried the gold bearing streams that became the renowned ‘deep leads’ of the gold mining era.

The country around Mount Franklin was described in 1855 as "thickly timbered with box and stringbark". Reports of fertile land waiting to be claimed prompted a minor rush by squatters who called the mount "Jem Crow Hill". Charles Joseph La Trobe, superintendent of the Port Phillip District of New South Wales named the mountain after Sir John Franklin after they climbed the hill together in December 1843.

In 1840, in response to concerns about the treatment of Aboriginal people by the settlers, the government took over Mount Franklin and the surrounding area for the Loddon Aboriginal Protectorate Station. The Protectorate Station was rife with mistreatment of local Aboriginal people.

In 1852, as part of the Victorian gold rush, gold was discovered in the immediate area. This placed additional pressures on the protectorate station and it was reduced and finally relocated.

Around 1865 the presence of a deep lead in Mount Franklin was established. Deep lead mining was initially unsuccessful, and it was not until the late 1870s that the Franklinford Gold Mining Company mined at Mount Franklin on a significant scale. A few years later the Mount Franklin Estate Gold Mining Company also struck gold, followed by the Shakespeare and Great Western companies in the mid-1880s. By the late 1880s, however, deep lead mining had ceased in the area.

As the alluvial gold was worked out, miners turned their attention to the gold-bearing leads deep beneath the earth’s surface. This gold was created by lava flows during the Newer Volcanic period, were mined intensively during the nineteenth century. One such company operated a mining lease at the eastern foot of Mount Franklin.

In 1866, the crater of Mount Franklin was set aside as a recreation reserve, and the remainder reserved as State forest. Owing to the high demand for land in the district, two areas of the reserve were excised and sold for agricultural settlement. This galvanised popular support for the permanent reservation of Mount Franklin.

During the 1870s and 80s, scenic qualities of natural bushland gained popularity as recreational venues as compared to formal parks and gardens. In 1875, a meeting asked the Victorian government to reserve all the land at Mount Franklin for public purposes and a reservation of 157 acres was gazetted the following year under shared management of the surrounding local government areas. In 1891 the Shire of Mount Franklin was given sole control of the reserve.

From the 1880s, parts of the reserve were being leased for grazing, providing much-needed revenue for the committee of management. By the 1920s, rabbit infestation was a major problem. Nevertheless, during this period the crater was still a popular destination for picnickers and pleasure-seekers. Mount Franklin was promoted as a local beauty spot within easy reach of Daylesford and Hepburn Springs mineral springs resort. A shelter shed and rainwater tank were erected.

In 1880, the railway network was extended to Daylesford making destinations like Mount Franklin a comfortable day-trip from Melbourne.

In 1944, a devastating bushfire destroyed most of the native vegetation on the mount. As a result, the inner and outer slopes of the crater were planted with exotic species, mainly conifers, to prevent erosion and to provide revenue through commercial harvesting. The caldera was planted with ornamentals such as silver birch, white poplar, Sycamore and Sequoia sempervirens (Californian Redwoods).

Not everyone approved of the scheme. Edgar Morrison remarked on Mount Franklin’s "pine-clad heights": "One feels that when the Forest Commission, a generation ago, draped this foreign garb around its shoulders, the old mount .... resented the indignity."

In 1955, 145 acres was re-reserved as permanent forest under the control of the Shire of Daylesford and Glenlyon. Within the reserve, an area of eight acres was set aside for recreation, specifically for an entrance gate and road which The new road made the mount more accessible at the same time as the dramatic increase in car ownership in the 1950s, and the lifting of war-time petrol rationing.

In 1972, the Department of Crown Lands and Survey took over the committee of management. In 1977, Mount Franklin was included in the new Hepburn Regional Park and managed by the Forest Commission of Victoria.

== "Mount Franklin" mineral spring ==
Mineral springs were noted in 1864, when bottling began at Ballan and Hepburn, and their flow rates were recorded during the mid-nineteenth-century gold mining era, and subsequently in 1910. Until 1986, mineral water was bottled by Coca-Cola Amatil from Gilmore's (Limestone Creek) Mineral Spring issuing on allotment No. 3, Section 6, Parish of Yandoit, on a small alluvial flat on the east bank of Limestone Creek located approximately 7 km north of the mount and west of the junction of Limestone Track and Midland Highway.

As noted in a 1910 mineralogy report, "one issue of the spring flowed at a rate of 192 gpd" (726 litres per day), while "other issues could not be measured but altogether they keep filled a water hole about one chain across. The water is palatable but not very strong. Gas is plentiful and may be seen rising in several places. The mineral matter precipitated from spring water covers about an acre around the spring and the water issues through it. It consists of limestone, calcareous sinter quartz, earthy or sandy particles and iron oxide. This deposit is still forming and the surface of the water hole is continuously coated with a dirty white scum. Ordovician rocks outcrop within a few chains of the spring. The more calcareous parts of the spring deposit were formerly burnt for lime and old kilns remain on the flat"

Water analysis (1950)	parts per million
Total dissolved solids (TDS)	4445
Cl	285
CO3	Nil
HCO3	3004
SO4 (sulphate)	20
NO3 (Albuminoid nitrogen)	0:14
NO3 free (NH3)	0.84
PO4	n.d.
K	n.d.
Na	615
Li	n.d.
Ca	208
Mg	194
Fe	49
Si03	n.d.
Oxygen (30 minutes)	9

Coca Cola, which had a licence to extract 35 megalitres, renamed the spring "Mount Franklin" as part of a re-branding exercise. Their peak per annum extraction was over 15 ML and the total to around 1986 was 14.52 ML. The Mount Franklin trade name remains nationally iconic and profitable for the company, though no water has been extracted from the original site for approximately 35 years. The mineral spring itself was destroyed and the structures have become overgrown and forgotten by the side of the Midland Highway and there is no signage on the site.

While the Mount Franklin brand remains under ownership of Coca Cola Amatil, the last water extraction occurred in the fiscal year 1985/1986. and the company's publicity makes no mention of the original spring, nor of the current source or sources of the water bottled under that name. The company continues to extract from the springs in the area including at Eganstown and Wheatsheaf. In 2003 Victorian Water Quality Monitoring Network analyses showed tap waters in Victoria being salted and carbonated and sold as “Mineral Waters” as since the 1990s the Australian government had deviated from international regulation in this field with respect to consumer protection by deferring to industry self-regulation and obviating a regulatory or welfare approach. Coca-Cola represented Australia.

== See also ==
- List of mountains in Australia § Victoria
