= Eric Dimsey =

Australian rules footballer

Personal information
- Full name: Eric Elmore Dimsey
- Born: 22 September 1892; Franklinford, Victoria
- Died: 17 October 1970 (aged 78); Richmond, Victoria
- Original team: Training College

Playing career^{1}
Years	Club	Games (Goals)
1913	Melbourne	2 (0)
- ^{1} Playing statistics correct to the end of 1913.

Eric Elmore Dimsey (22 September 1892 – 17 October 1970) was an Australian rules footballer who played with Melbourne in the Victorian Football League (VFL).
