= Susan Charles Rankin =

Australian Indigenous activist

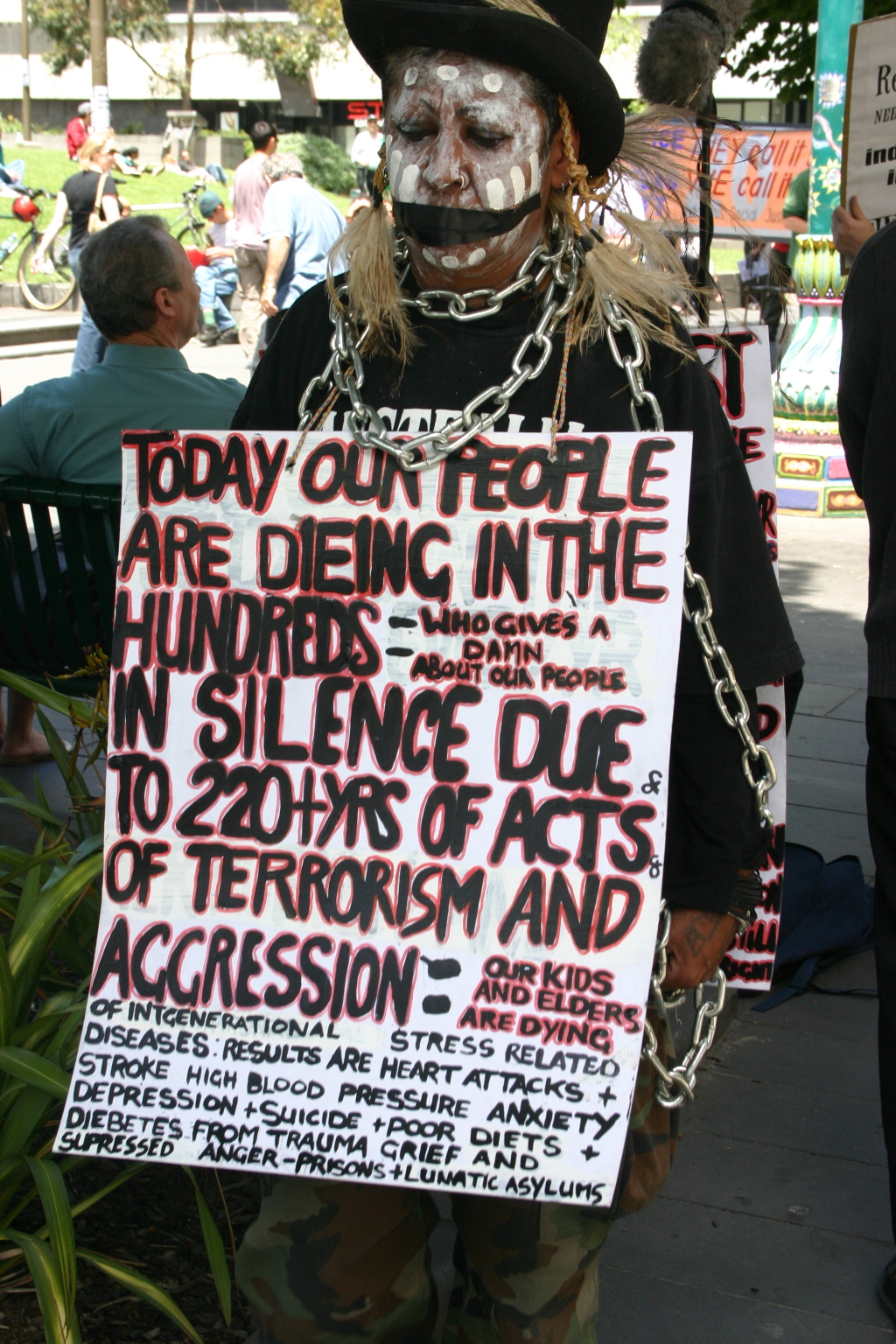
Aunty Sue Rankin at Human Rights Day gathering in Melbourne, 2005

Susan Charles Rankin (born 1957), also known as Aunty Sue Rankin, is an Australian Indigenous rights and human rights activist and Elder of the Dja Dja Wurrung people of the Kulin nation from Central Victoria, Australia. She was one of five signatories by Australian Aboriginal elders who lodged a writ in the High Court of Australia in April 2005 calling for the Australian Federal Government to be investigated for crimes of genocide.

On 26 May 2004, National Sorry Day, Susan Rankin, peacefully re-occupied crown land at Franklinford in central Victoria, calling her campsite the Going Home Camp as it is a site of significance to the Dja Dja Wurrung. Rankin asked the Victorian Department of Sustainability and Environment to produce documents proving that the Crown has the right to occupy these lands. According to the 2 June 2004 Daylesford Advocate, local DSE officers admitted they "cannot produce these documents and doubt that such documents exist". Police later arrested her and took her to Ballarat, but no charges were pressed.

In 2007 Susan Rankin embarked upon a 1,500 kilometre Sacred Life Walk from Adelaide to Uluru in a bid to "bring world-wide focus on Mother Earth’s changes and the continued deplorable treatment and living conditions of Aboriginal Peoples in the homelands of her Ancestors."
