= Thomas Dunolly =

Thomas Dunolly (1856–1923) was an early Indigenous Australian rights activist. He was a member of the Dja Dja Wurrung people. The surname Dunolly is the name of the township where he was born.

Dunolly attended the Aboriginal school at Franklinford before being forcibly resettled at Coranderrk Reserve in 1864.

In the 1880s he played an important part in the first organised protests by aborigines in the campaign to save Coranderrk. As Dunolly was younger with more literacy skills than William Barak and the other protest leaders, he acted as principal scribe for the protests which included writing letters to newspapers, petitions, statements of evidence and letters to bureaucrats and politicians.

Despite the protests the 1886 Aborigines Protection Act, commonly called the Half-caste act, was enacted which banned children of mixed parentage and over 13 years from living on stations and reserves and imposed stricter controls on those allowed to remain. This split many families and decimated the workforce of Coranderrk, which allowed the Board for the Protection of Aborigines to push further for the closure of Coranderrk, finally succeeding on 31 January 1924.
