= Jean Beadle =

Australian activist

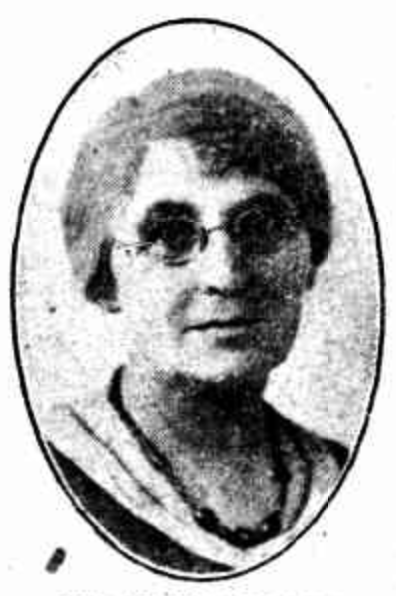
- Jean Beadle, J.P.
- Born: Jane Miller; 1 January 1868; Clunes, Victoria, Australia
- Died: 22 May 1942 (aged 74); Perth, Western Australia, Australia
- Resting place: Karrakatta Cemetery
- Political party: Labor Party
- Spouse: Henry Beadle (m. 1888)

Jean Beadle (born Jane Miller; 1 January 1868 – 22 May 1942) was an Australian feminist, social worker and Labor party member.

== Life ==
Jane Miller was born on 1 January 1868 in Clunes, Victoria, daughter of George Darlington Miller, a miner, and his wife Jane Spencer. She left school early to assist her widowed father. She worked in Melbourne's oppressive clothing factories until her marriage to Henry Beadle (a militant and an iron moulder) on 19 May 1888.

Beadle was involved in industrial action, working with striking miners and their families and organised a union of female factory workers. She joined the Women's Suffrage Alliance and, from 1898, was prominent in the Women's Political and Social Crusade.

In 1901 the Beadles moved to Western Australia; Jean Beadle founded the Labor women's organization in Fremantle in 1905, and when they moved to the goldfields in 1906 she formed the Eastern Goldfields Women's Labor League. After returning to Perth in 1911, she played an active role in the ALP and was a delegate at the first Labor Women's Conference at Perth in October 1912, and was appointed the chairperson, a position she held for 30 years. Through her involvement with the party she was a candidate for Senate pre-selection in 1931.

Beadle was associated with the Perth Children's Court since 1915 and was appointed special magistrate in 1919, and from 1920 was one of the first women to be a sworn magistrate in Perth.

Beadle died at home on 22 May 1942 and is buried in the Methodist section of Karrakatta Cemetery in Perth.

Jeanette Place, in the Canberra suburb of Gilmore, is named in her honour, "Jeanette" having been her pen-name.

== See also ==
- List of suffragists and suffragettes
- List of Australian suffragists
