= Munangabum =

Indigenous Australian leader

Munangabum (? - 1846) was an influential clan head of the Liarga balug and Spiritual Leader or neyerneyemeet of the Dja Dja Wurrung people in central Victoria, Australia.

He was influential in shaping his peoples response to invasion and European settlement in the 1830s and 1840s. He was gaoled in 1840 for sheep-stealing which resulted in Dja Dja Wurrung people traveling to Melbourne to plead for his release. Woiwurrung and Djadja wurrung people feared that unless Munangabum was released, he would move Bunjil to release the Mindye causing a plague to black and white.

Munangabum was released from gaol in August 1840. On 7 February 1841 Munangabum was shot and wounded in the shoulder above the shoulder blade by settlers while his companion Gondiurmin died at Far Creek Station, west of Maryborough. Three settlers were later apprehended and tried on 18 May 1841 for the murder of Gondiurmin but were acquitted for want of evidence, as aborigines could not give evidence in courts of law.

Munangabum was murdered in 1846 by a rival clan-head from the south.
