= Jaara baby =

1800s Aboriginal Australian child

The Jaara baby was an Aboriginal Australian child who died at some stage during the 1840s to 1860s. The child's remains were discovered in 1904, and kept in storage by Museum Victoria for ninety-nine years, until in 2003 they were repatriated to the Dja Dja Wurrung community. The remains were of particular significance because they were found traditionally wrapped in possum skins along with about 130 other artifacts of both European and Aboriginal origin.

== Discovery ==
The Jaara baby was first discovered by Europeans on 10 September 1904, near the town of Charlton, Victoria, by a woodcutter. He was felling a hollow tree when he discovered the remains wrapped in a possum skin bundle hidden within the tree's trunk. The remains were referred to the Victorian Coroner at the time, who determined that they had been buried in accordance with Aboriginal custom. He suggested that the remains be given to the National Museum of Victoria.

== Identity ==
Although it had been buried in accordance with Aboriginal custom, there was some doubt as to the identity of the Jaara baby, primarily because it was buried with both Aboriginal and European artifacts. These included Aboriginal necklaces, an apron and a tool belt, along with European items such as a button, an axe head and a baby's bootie. The items were sprinkled with ochre before they were tied up in a bundle of dried possum skins.

At one point, Gary Foley, who at the time was the curator of the Bunjilaka exhibition at the Melbourne Museum, was approached by a white man from Canberra who claimed that the Jaara baby was an ancestor of his. He claimed that the baby was actually a European child, who had been abducted by Aboriginal tribesmen during the period of frontier violence which decimated Aboriginal populations in Victoria's west during the mid-nineteenth century. Although tests on the Jaara remains were not conclusive, they did reveal that the child was no more than eighteen months old, whereas the abducted white child was three years old.

However, the question of why the baby was buried along with European artifacts is still unanswered. Gary Murray, chairman of the Northwest Region Aboriginal Cultural Heritage Board (and a member of the Dja Dja Wurrung nation), has suggested that the Jaara baby was probably the child of an elder or tribal chief, due to the sheer number and richness of the grave goods. The European items were probably included as a record of the tribe's history at the time, a memorial of conflict with European settlers.

== Repatriation ==
The baby remained in storage at Museum Victoria until 1994, when researchers from an Aboriginal cultural protection cooperative came across it in the museum catalogue, and were given permission to examine the remains. Later, anthropologist Alan West commenced a study to catalogue all remains in storage at the museum, including the Jaara baby.

In 2002, Gary Murray was negotiating the return of a number of artifacts from the Museum Victoria collection, under the museum's repatriation program, begun in the 1980s. He was given a list of the Dja Dja Wurrung artifacts that the museum had in their possession. However, one museum employee noticed that the Jaara baby was not on the list. Murray approached Gary Foley, who in turn approached the museum, and, after some dispute, it was agreed that the Jaara baby was to be repatriated.

Alan West did not want the bundle to be returned, since he had nearly finished his cataloguing project, and had wanted to separate the remains from the grave goods. This proposal was rejected outright by Murray and other members of the Northwest Region Board. Eventually, West resigned from the museum in late August 2003.

On 10 September 2003, the Jaara baby was finally returned to its home in Dja Dja Wurrung country, and was reburied, ninety-nine years after it was removed. A handover ceremony, which included ceremonial dances by both Dja Dja Wurrung and Wurundjeri people, was conducted by Lord Mayor of Melbourne John So.
