= Waterloo Plains massacre =

1838 massacre of Indigenous Australians in the Port Phillip District

- Part of Australian frontier wars
- Waterloo Plains (Australia)
- Location: 30°38′42″S 150°50′60″E
- Date: June 1838
- Deaths: 8-23 Djadjawurrung
- Injuries: Unknown
- Perpetrators: John Coppock, Samuel Fuller, Henry Monro, Charles Ebden, William Bowman, Charles Hutton, convict servants
- Motive: Revenge for killing of station hands and sheep stealing
- Convictions: None

The Waterloo Plains massacre occurred in June 1838 when 8 to 23 Djadjawurrung Aboriginal people were killed in a reprisal raid for the killing of two convict servants and theft of sheep.

== Background ==
In late 1837, the Barfold sheep station was established on Djadjawurrung country by William Henry Yaldwyn, when his station overseer John Coppock drove 4,000 sheep from the Goulburn area to a site along the Campaspe River, about 8 miles (13 km) north of Kyneton.

Coppock's men soon formed a habit of shooting the resident Indigenous people including women and children. Other colonists took up land around Barfold in early 1838 including Henry Monro at Spring Plains, Captain Charles Hutton at Campaspe Plains, Alexander Mollison at Coliban, Charles Ebden at Carlsruhe and William Bowman at Sutton Grange. Bowman shot at every black person he saw on his run, while Hutton believed in punishing the tribes wholesale and exterminating them completely.

In April 1838, conflict between the British pastoralist invaders and the neighbouring Taungurung people from the Goulburn River region resulted in the Faithful Massacre of eight British stockmen near the present site of Benalla. Subsequent reprisal raids killed up to 100 Aboriginal people.

The upsurge in violence spread to the Barfold region where in May 1838, two of Coppock's convict workers, a hut keeper and watchman, were found dead, and 1200 sheep missing.

== Massacre ==
Coppock summoned about 20 convict men from Barfold and surrounding stations owned by Charles Ebden (Carlsruhe station), Dr William Bowman (Sutton Grange) and Henry Monro (Spring Plains).

The armed and mounted party tracked the Djadjawurrung people to their camp in a gully (now known as Waterloo Plains). The armed party attacked at night, taking the Djadjawurrung by surprise as they cooked the stolen sheep. The terrain meant the victims had little defence other than their spears and shields. When the attack was over, between 8 and 23 Djadjawurrung were dead and others wounded. Two of the attackers sustained minor injuries.

Chief Protector of Aborigines George Augustus Robinson reported:

They fired from their horses; the blacks were down in the hole. They were out of distance of spears. One old man kept supplying them with spears and was soon shot. Great many were shot. Some other blacks held up pieces of bark to keep off the balls but it was no use. Some were shot dead with their bark in their hands.

== Aftermath ==
When Melbourne police magistrate William Lonsdale was informed about the killings, he passed the report on to the Governor in Sydney, and Coppock and his party were summoned there to explain. However, Coppock missed the boat from Williamstown to Sydney and was never held to account for his actions.

Conflict between the British colonists and the local Indigenous people continued after the massacre. In July 1839, Henry Monro was wounded by a spear after one of his huts was robbed by "the blacks". Small detachments of Border Police and New South Wales Mounted Police were sent to the area to drive "the blacks" off the runs of Yaldwyn, Monro, Ebden, Hutton and Mollison, resulting in several Aboriginal people being killed.

In January 1840, Robinson travelled to Monro's station and crossed the Coliban River, locating the site of the Waterloo Plains massacre on small hill behind an abandoned hut.

While Robinson was present, Monro again summoned a detachment of Mounted Police to conduct a punitive expedition against the resident Indigenous people on his property for stealing sheep. On 27 January, Monro with four of his stockmen and Lieutenant Frederick Russell of the 28th Regiment with 4 troopers of the Mounted Police, raided an Aboriginal camp killing at least two unarmed Djadjawurrung men and severely wounding several more. One prisoner, a Djadjawurrung man named Munnangabumbum, was captured, beaten, chained by the legs and hands, and transported to Melbourne.

== See also ==
- List of massacres of Indigenous Australians
