= Clunes, Victoria =

Clunes
- Town
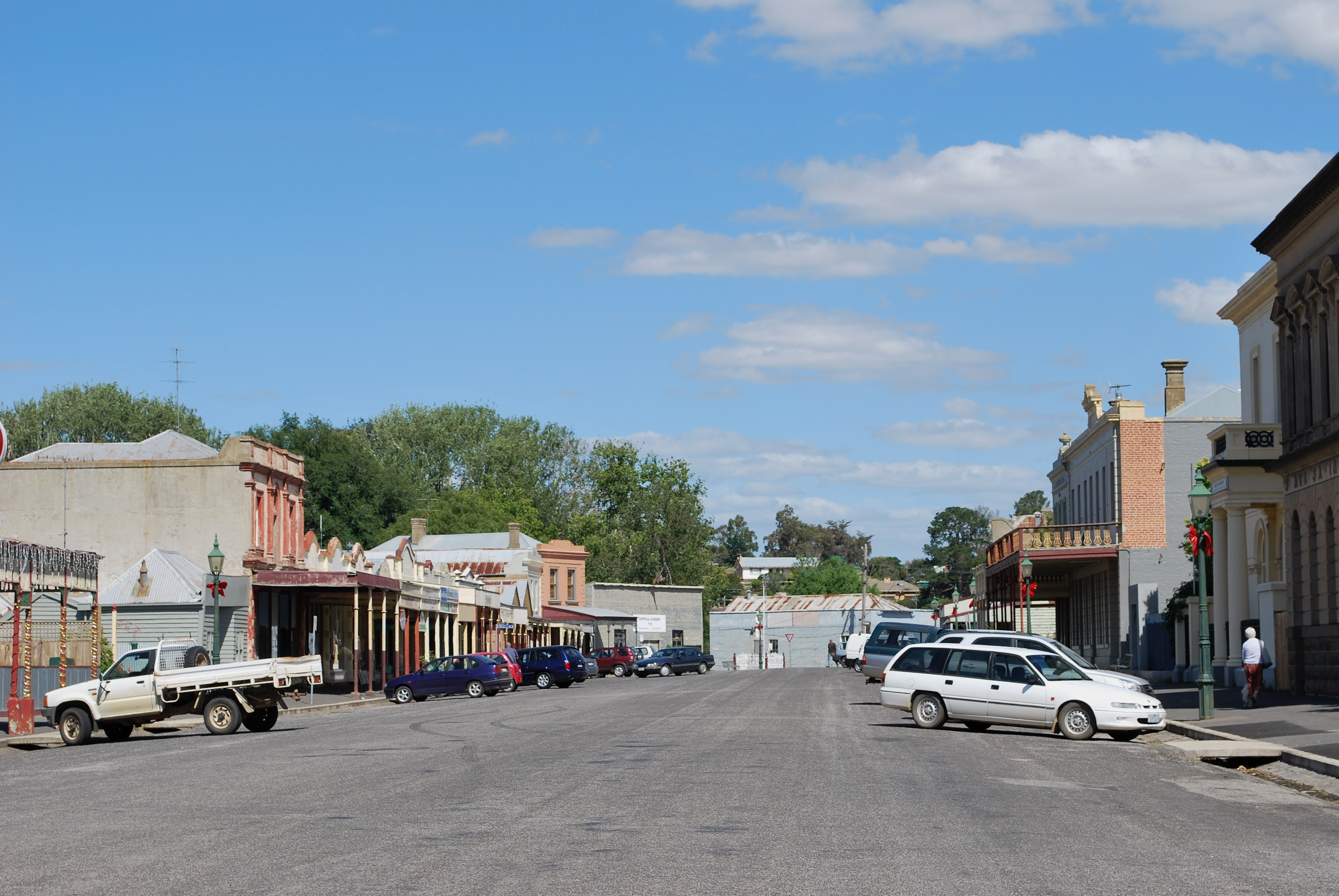
- Main street of Clunes

- Coordinates: 37°18′0″S 143°47′0″E
- Country: Australia
- State: Victoria
- LGA: Shire of Hepburn
- Location: 139 km (86 mi) from Melbourne; 34 km (21 mi) from Ballarat; 92 km (57 mi) from Bendigo
- Established: mid-1850s

Government
  - State electorate: Ripon
  - Federal division: Ballarat
- Elevation: 310 m (1,020 ft)

Population
  - Total: 1,844 (2021 census)
- Postcode: 3370
- Mean max temp: 19.6 °C (67.3 °F)
- Mean min temp: 6.3 °C (43.3 °F)
- Annual rainfall: 575.2 mm (22.65 in)

Clunes is a town in Victoria, Australia, 36 km (22 mi) north of Ballarat, in the Shire of Hepburn. At the 2021 census, it had a population of 1,844.

Clunes is best known as the site of Victoria's first registered gold discovery in 1850 and its first gold strike in 1873, which lasted three months. A campus of Wesley College is based in Clunes and parts of the original Mad Max (1979) were filmed in the town, famously showcasing the Creswick Creek Bridge, in Clunes’s more regional farming area. Other films include “Ned Kelly” (2016) and Stan TV series “Bloom” (2018). The annual Clunes Booktown Festival began in 2007 and draws significant tourism to the area, with over 10 book shops around the town.

== History ==
=== Pre-colonial ===
The Dja Dja Wurrung, an Aboriginal Australian people belonging to the Kulin nation, first inhabited the region which included Clunes. Most of their population was decimated in the twenty years after Scottish explorer Thomas Mitchell surveyed the land in 1836. This was due to the introduction of European occupation and diseases; for example, 6–10 tribesmen were killed in the 1839 Blood Hole massacre at the nearby Glengower station.

Mitchell probably encouraged his fellow clansmen to take up pastures which, on his travels, were bordered by a line dug into the earth by his drays. They included overlander Donald Cameron, who took up a 12,000 ha (120 km^{2}) run in mid-1839 and named it Clunes for his Scottish hometown, building a homestead in the 1850s. While Cameron was the first European settler, his run was soon bordered by those of other Scottish pastoralists.

=== Pastoral and gold rush ===
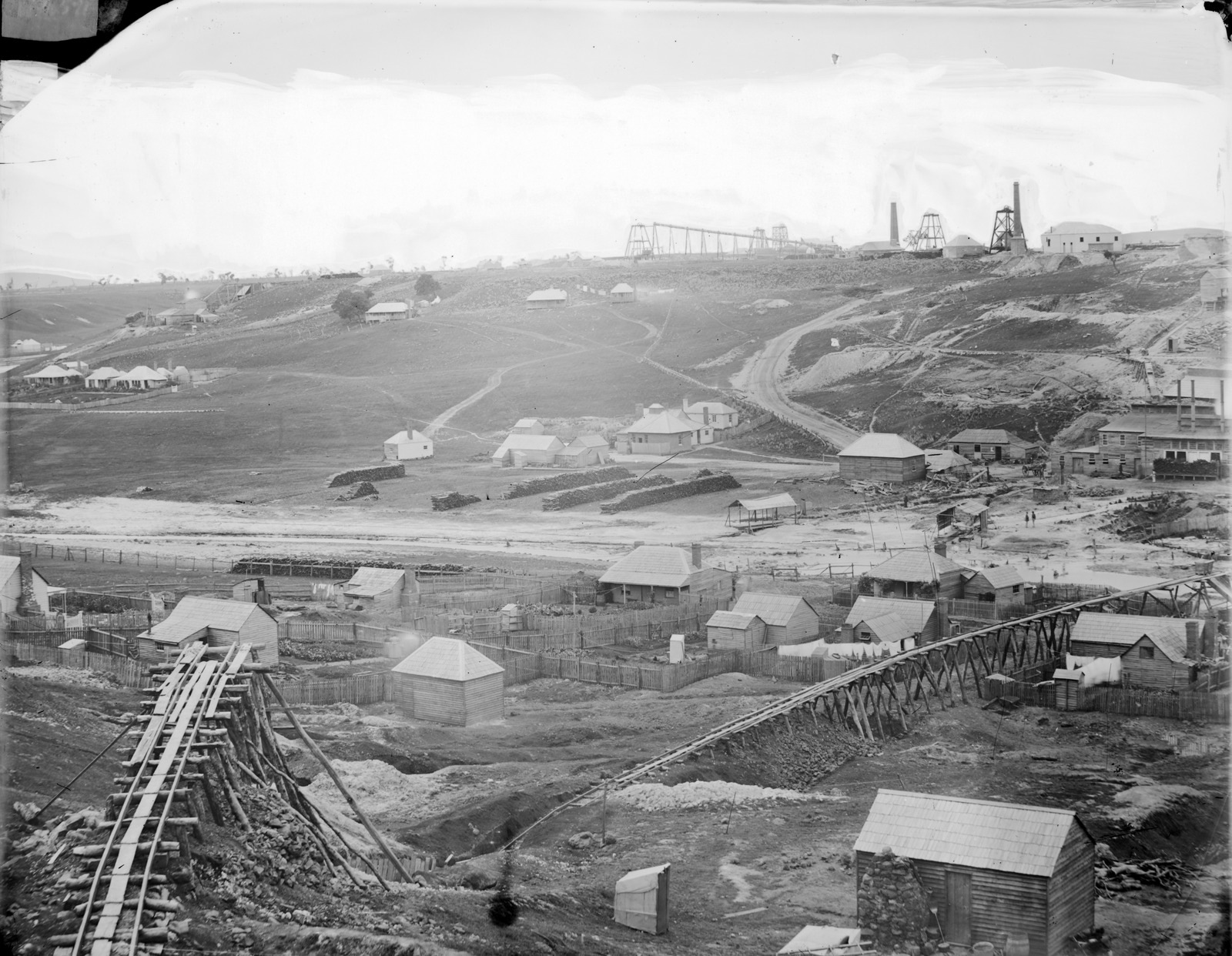
View of Clunes and the Port Phillip and Colonial Gold Mining Company operations in 1861

In March 1850, a party of four, including Cameron and his friend William Campbell MLA, found traces of gold on his station. The discovery initially was kept secret as it was feared that announcing it would be detrimental to the Clunes run.

In April 1851, German physicist George Hermann Bruhn arrived at Clunes while on a journey to examine the Colony of Victoria's mineral resources and was shown specimens of gold by Cameron. Bruhn spread the discovery across Australia and sent specimens to the Gold Discovery Committee on 30 June. After confirming the area was auriferous, James Esmond—who had been informed by Bruhn—and his co-worker James Pugh enlisted the help of sawyers Burns and Kelly; they obtained gold in quartz rocks near Clunes on 29 June. The Geelong Advertiser announced these findings on 7 July and the precise location of Esmond's discovery on 22 July.

William Campbell's announcement in Melbourne and Davies news item triggered the gold rush in Victoria. The township was established a few years later and subsequent gold mining predominantly driven by the Port Phillip and Colonial Mining Company which was mining the site of the discovery saw the town's population rising to well over 6,000 residents in the late 1880s.

Clunes post office opened as early as 1 October 1857. In 1871, the bluestone St Paul's Anglican Church was completed, replacing an older Anglican church in the town.. In 1873, another bluestone church, St Thomas Aquinas' Catholic Church, was built, replacing an earlier Catholic church. In 1874 Clunes was connected to the Victorian railway network, and Clunes station was opened in the same year. Clunes also has the distinction of having the first mining strike in Victoria. On 13 September 1873, an old miner, Mayor Blanchard, was elected as the first president of the Clunes Miners’ Association. The Association took a resolute not to work more than eleven shifts per fortnight and went on strike in 15th September 1873.

In 1873 mine employers attempted to introduce Saturday afternoon and Sunday shifts. The miners refused to sign the new terms outlined in their contract renewals and went on a strike that lasted 3 months. Some days into the action the miners organised the Clunes Miners' Association and what were to become known as the Clunes riots, successfully resisting the use of Chinese labour from Creswick as strikebreakers.

From the 1850s through to 1893, when gold mining eventually came to an end, Clunes was an important gold production location in Victoria. Surrounded by grassland, meadows and pastures, the town has preserved many of its historic buildings and is recognised as one of the most architecturally-intact gold towns in Victoria.

=== Twentieth century ===
The Clunes Magistrates' Court closed on 1 January 1983.

=== 21st century ===
==== Booktown ====
The idea of transforming Clunes into a European-style booktown was first conceived and developed by Councillor Tim Hayes, Linda Newitt, Graeme Johnston and Tess Brady. Clunes held its first "Booktown for a Day" event on 20 May 2007. Over 130 booksellers from around Australia set up shop for the day in the town's heritage buildings and lining the main street. Renamed to "Back to Booktown" a year later and to "Clunes Booktown Festival" in 2012, as of 2020 was holding the event each year on the third weekend in March.

The event has won recognition and awards, including:

- 2008: Hepburn Shire's Community Event of the Year
- 21 January 2010: John Brumby, premier of Victoria, said during the Australia Day Luncheon: "In Victoria we even have our very own booktown. The regional community of Clunes in north-west Victoria sees its future as a cultural destination centred around literature. As well as their successful 'Back to Booktown' festival, just last month our Government helped launch the new Creative Clunes Community Bookshop."
- 23 November 2010: Australian Civic Trust Award of Merit in the Human Category to "Back to Booktown", for its use of heritage buildings in a "respectful, as against destructive use"
- 19 April 2012: Clunes given "International Book Town" status, by the International Organisation of Book Towns
- 2013: Australia Day awards for Hepburn Shire's Community Event of the Year, to "Children's Booktown 2012'

==== Wesley College campus ====
Between 2000 and 2008, Clunes underwent a noticeable transformation and rejuvenation following the decision by Wesley College, Australia's largest co-educational private school, to establish a campus for Year 9 students in the town. Opened in 2000, about 80 students take up residency in the Wesley Clunes Residential Learning Village in the centre of town and become part of the local community for an eight-week period each term. Where they learn how to live in a shared house and how to live with others when they grow up.

== Sport ==
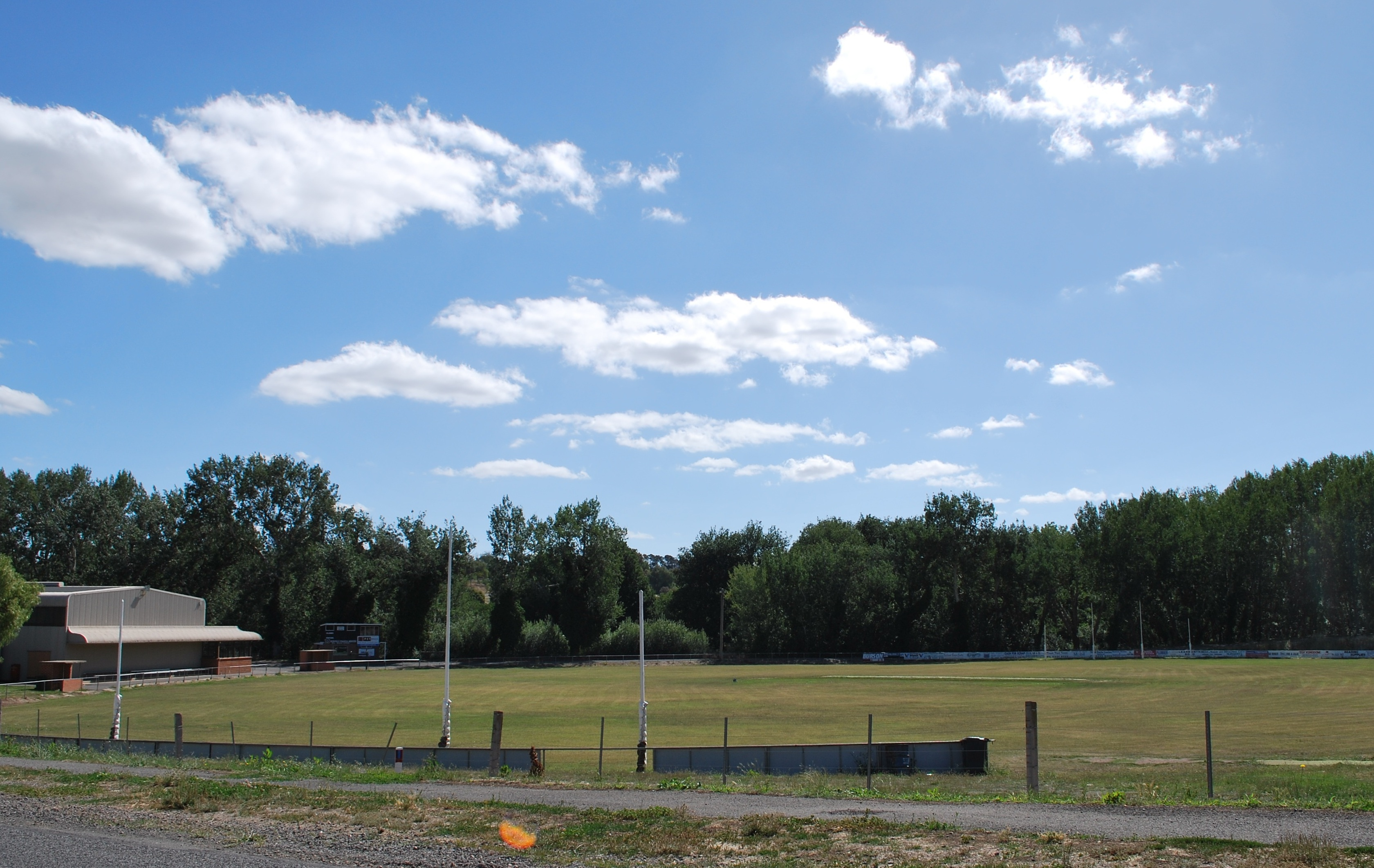
Clunes Football Ground, home of the Clunes Magpies

The town's Australian rules football/netball team is the Clunes Magpies, competing in the Central Highlands Football League and Central Highlands Netball League.

Golfers play at the Clunes Golf Club on Golf Course Road.

Clunes has a cricket club playing in the Maryborough District Cricket Association.

Clunes has a lawn bowls club that competes in the Ballarat District Bowls Division.

== Transport ==
Clunes railway station is located on the Mildura line.

When the state government announced the Victorian Transport Plan, along with V/Line services being extended to Maryborough, Clunes was not part of the plan (with the only stations being Creswick and Maryborough). However, as a result of protest by the town, the Government announced on 17 June 2010 that Clunes would be reopened and included on the line.

== In film ==
- Many of the external scenes and some internal scenes in the 2003 film Ned Kelly, starring Heath Ledger, were shot in Clunes. The Old State Bank in Fraser Street was used for the internal scenes featuring the "Euroa" bank robbery.
- Clunes also appears in the films Mad Max starring Mel Gibson, as the town the Toe Cutters gang arrive at to collect the Night Riders body, and the remake of the 1950s classic On the Beach. It also appears in the ABC television series' Queen Kat, Carmel & St Jude, Something in the Air and Halifax f.p..
- Clunes was once closed off to the public for the TV show The Mole in 2001. The mission in that episode was to direct one of the contestants to pick up another contestant in a blacked-out car.
- Tomorrow, When the War Began aired on ABC3 in early 2016.
- Much of the series finale of the HBO show The Leftovers was filmed in Clunes.
- The Picnic at Hanging Rock 2018 remake filmed exterior scenes in the Clunes main street.
- The Stan series Bloom used Clunes as its central township.
- Some scenes for the True History of the Kelly Gang
- One short film shot in Clunes is Julius Avery's 13-minute movie Jerrycan. Jerrycan won the 2008 Jury Prize at the 61st Cannes Film Festival in France for short films, with its portrayal of restless teenagers in rural Victoria.

== Notable residents or place of birth ==
- Jean Beadle (1868–1942) – labour leader, feminist and social worker
- Rivett Henry Bland (1811–1894) – manager of the Port Phillip and Colonial Gold Mining Company from 1852 and the Clunes Quartz Mining Company who oversaw the development and success of the mine.
- Nancy Jobson (1880–1964) – headmistress
- Robert (Bob) Lewis (1878–1947) – jockey
- Sir John Longstaff (1861–1941) – artist
- Harley Tarrant (1860–1949) – businessman
- Daryl Jackson AO (1937–2026) – prominent architect
- Nick Hind (b.1994) – AFL player

== Climate ==
Climate data for Clunes, elevation 332 m (1,089 ft)
Month	Jan	Feb	Mar	Apr	May	Jun	Jul	Aug	Sep	Oct	Nov	Dec	Year
Record high °C (°F)	43.3 (109.9)	40.9 (105.6)	36.8 (98.2)	31.8 (89.2)	24.9 (76.8)	19.0 (66.2)	20.7 (69.3)	20.6 (69.1)	27.0 (80.6)	33.2 (91.8)	36.1 (97.0)	38.0 (100.4)	43.3 (109.9)
Mean daily maximum °C (°F)	28.5 (83.3)	28.1 (82.6)	24.7 (76.5)	19.6 (67.3)	15.1 (59.2)	12.0 (53.6)	11.2 (52.2)	12.8 (55.0)	15.6 (60.1)	18.9 (66.0)	22.7 (72.9)	26.3 (79.3)	19.6 (67.3)
Mean daily minimum °C (°F)	10.8 (51.4)	11.3 (52.3)	9.3 (48.7)	6.5 (43.7)	4.2 (39.6)	2.7 (36.9)	2.0 (35.6)	2.7 (36.9)	3.9 (39.0)	5.3 (41.5)	7.3 (45.1)	9.3 (48.7)	6.3 (43.3)
Record low °C (°F)	−0.6 (30.9)	3.9 (39.0)	1.2 (34.2)	−3.4 (25.9)	−3.3 (26.1)	−5.1 (22.8)	−4.9 (23.2)	−5.3 (22.5)	−5.0 (23.0)	−2.6 (27.3)	−1.1 (30.0)	1.7 (35.1)	−5.3 (22.5)
Average rainfall mm (inches)	34.1 (1.34)	35.5 (1.40)	33.5 (1.32)	42.5 (1.67)	54.5 (2.15)	60.3 (2.37)	59.0 (2.32)	63.9 (2.52)	56.2 (2.21)	54.3 (2.14)	45.7 (1.80)	39.4 (1.55)	578.7 (22.78)
Average rainy days (≥ 1.0 mm)	3.5	3.1	3.9	5.5	7.6	9.3	10.1	10.6	9.0	7.8	5.8	4.8	81.0
Source: Australian Bureau of Meteorology
