= St Thomas Aquinas' Church, Clunes =

Closed Roman Catholic church in Victoria, Australia

St Thomas Aquinas' Catholic Church
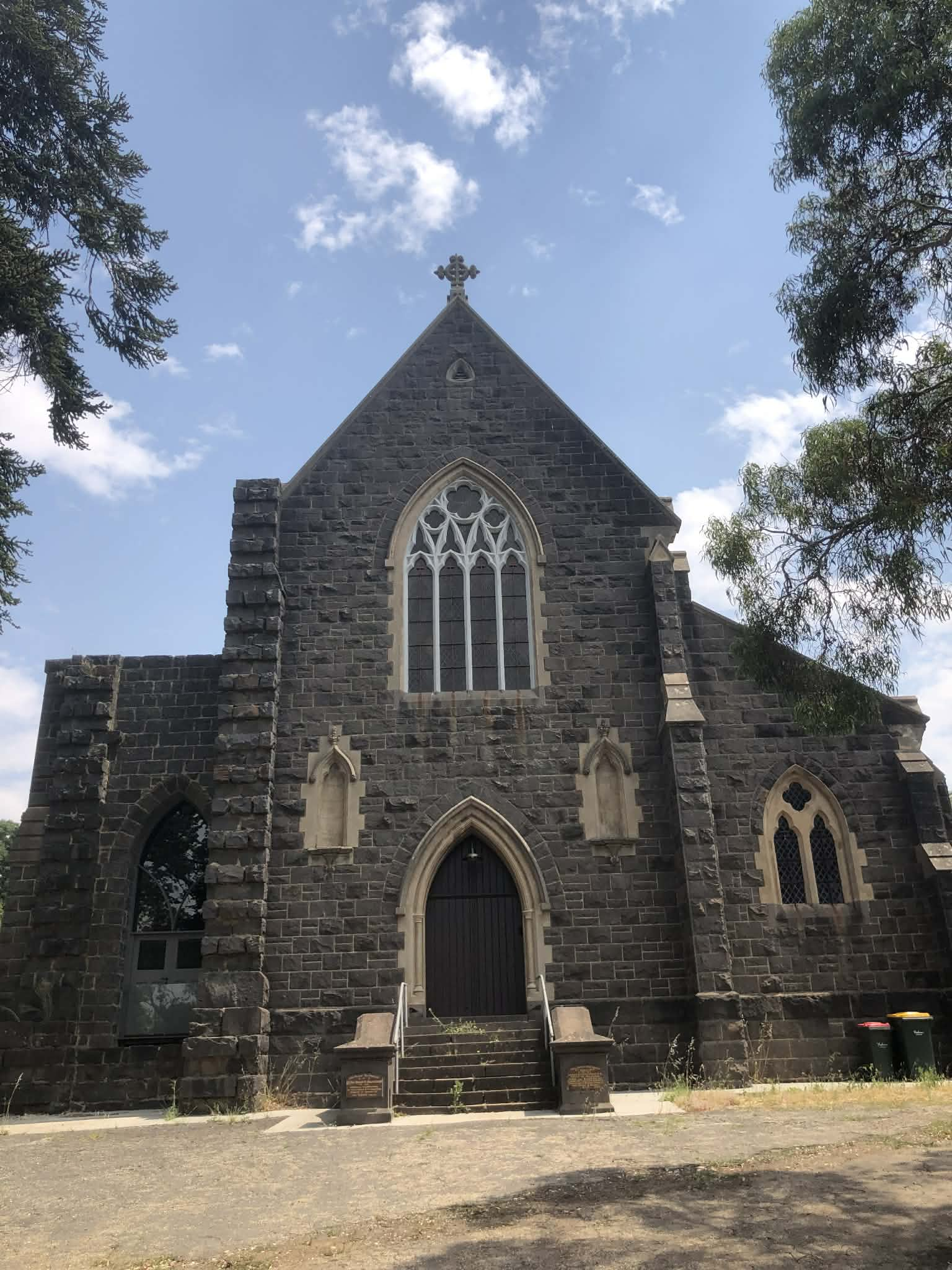
- St Thomas Aquinas' Catholic Church
- St Thomas Aquinas' Catholic Church
- 37°17′40″S 143°47′05″E
- Address: 90 Bailey Street, Clunes, Victoria
- Country: Australia
- Denomination: Roman Catholic

History
- Status: Church
- Dedication: Thomas Aquinas

Architecture
- Functional status: Closed (private residence)
- Architect(s): Henry R. Casselli, William B. Tappin
- Architectural type: Church
- Style: Gothic Revival
- Years built: 1859-1860 (original), 1913 (present building)
- Closed: 2012

Specifications
- Materials: Bluestone

Administration
- Diocese: Ballarat
- Parish: Creswick

St Thomas Aquinas' Church is a historic Roman Catholic church building located in the town of Clunes, Victoria, Australia. The present church built, completed in 1873 replacing earlier churches on the site, served the Catholic community of the town for more than century, before closing in 2018. The church building is recording on the National Trust register for its architectural and historical significance.

== History ==
Catholic worship in Clunes began during the early years of the town's development as a gold-mining centre, with an early chapel being erected in 1858.

This early chapel was later replaced with a timber church, constructed in 1866, built in a Gothic style.

The present bluestone church was begun in 1872 to designs of architects Henry Richards Caselli and W. B. Tappin. The building was influenced by the design of several major Catholic churches in Victoria, including St Patrick's Cathedral, Ballarat, and St Patrick's Church, Port Fairy. The church was officially opened on 9 March 1873 by the Right Reverend James Alipius Goold of Melbourne. The original timber church was moved to the rear of the church, where it was used as a school building until 1926. A house used as a presbytery by the church was gutted by fire in 1903, and was replaced by a red-brick structure in January 1905.

The church was closed in 2018, and has since been sold twice, on 3 May 2018 for $520,000 and again on 7 December 2021.

In 2023, plans were put forward to the Hepburn Shire council to renovate the church building.
