= St Paul's Anglican Church, Clunes =

Anglican church in Clunes, Victoria, Australia

- St Paul's Church of England Church
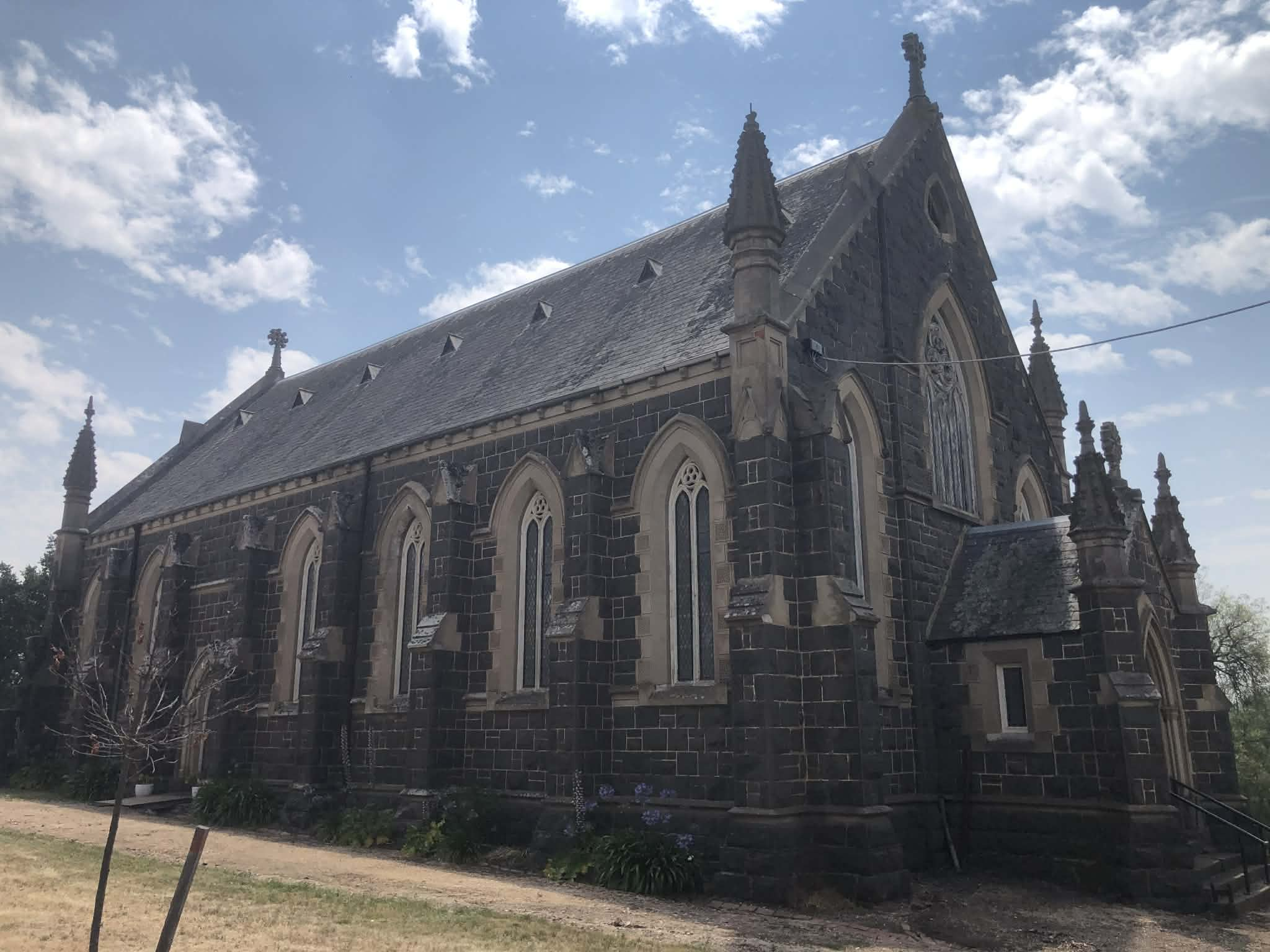
- St Paul's Anglican Church
- St Paul's Anglican Church, Clunes
- 37°17′40″S 143°47′00″E
- Location: 10 Templeton Street Clunes, Victoria
- Country: Australia
- Denomination: Anglican Church of Australia
- Website: https://springmountanglicans.wixsite.com/parish/clunes

History
- Status: Active
- Dedication: Saint Paul

Architecture
- Architect: Thomas Austin
- Style: Gothic
- Years built: 1859–1860 (original church), 1870–1871 (present church)
- Completed: 1871

Administration
- Province: Victoria
- Diocese: Ballarat

Victorian Heritage Register
- Official name: Former St Paul's Church of England, Hall & Organ
- Type: Heritage Place
- Designated: September 19, 1989
- Reference no.: H1858

St Paul's Anglican Church is a historic Anglican church located in Clunes, Victoria, Australia. The church, completed in 1871, remains an active place of Anglican worship in the Parish of Springmount, within the Anglican Diocese of Ballarat. The church and its grounds contain several heritage listings, including the church itself, the adjacent hall (which was the original church), the war memorial and an organ inside the church.

== History ==
Prior to the construction of the bluestone church, an original Anglican church was constructed between 1859 and 1860, and was erected on nearby Fraser Street. It was constructed as a single nave, with transepts eventually added, and was later moved to the present grounds on Templeton Street.

The original church is uncommon for its external use of board-and-batten skin, which is rarely found in Victoria. Tudor label moulds can be seen above the openings.

The bluestone church was constructed between 1870 and 1871, in the Gothic style, completed with concrete dressings, to the design of Thomas Austin, of the Austin and Johnson architectural firm. It is reputedly the only known Australian work of his.

=== Organ ===
The pipe organ was built by Hamlin and Son, London, in 1866 for an order to a Melbourne individual intended for personal use. However, the client died and so it remained unused until it was installed in the Daylesford Methodist Church in 1881. It was eventually sold to St Paul's Anglican Church, where it was then installed at its present site in 1888.

The only known surviving organ built by the Hamlins in the United Kingdom is found in the Holy Trinity Church, in Torbryan, Devon, England. The organ inside St Paul's is also the only known surviving organ built by the Hamlins in Australia.

=== War Memorial ===
Within the church grounds is a war memorial dedicated to local soldiers who were killed in World War 1. The men include Rector Frith, Daniel Jones, Malcolm King, Hugh Lee, Stanley Williamson, Roy Payne, Kempson Skellett, Augustus Smithson, Clarence Thomas, Paul Richardson, and others.
