= Koonchera Point massacre =

Massacre in South Australia

- Part of the Australian frontier wars
- Location: 26°41′6″S 139°30′14″E; Mindiri Hole, near Lake Howitt in far north South Australia
- Date: 1880s
- Target: Aboriginal Australians
- Deaths: 200–500
- Perpetrators: Colonial police, Aboriginal Police
- Motive: Punitive

The Koonchera Point massacre was an attack by colonial police on Aboriginal Australians that took place at Mindiri Hole near Lake Howitt in far north South Australia in the 1880s. Part of the Australian frontier wars, sources indicate that it resulted in the deaths of between 200 and 500 Ngameni, Yawarrawarrka, Yandruwandha and Bugadji people. The event that led to the attack was the killing and eating of a bullock by Aboriginal people. The massacre was unreported by the police, but one of the five survivors related what occurred to an Arabana elder, and in 1971 he reported it to the linguist Luise Hercus. The elder described the massacre as "the end of the Mindiri people".
