= Newlyn North =

Newlyn North Victoria
- Population: 230 (2021 census)
- Postcode(s): 3364
- LGA(s): Shire of Hepburn
- State electorate(s): Ripon
- Federal division(s): Ballarat

Newlyn North is a locality in the Shire of Hepburn, in Victoria, Australia. At the 2021 census, it had a population of 230, decreasing from 283 in the 2011 census. Newlyn North and Newlyn split in 1915 after a naming dispute between the town's two post offices.

== History ==
Newlyn, Victoria is a town in the Shire of Hepburn on the Midland Highway. By 1915, Newlyn had two post offices. The first opened as the Bella Vue Post Office before it moved to the railway station and was renamed the Newlyn Railway Station Post Office. The second was more to the north and had operated under the name Newlyn Post Office ever since it had opened, forty-six years prior to 1915. It was then conducted by J. Williams.

In 1915, the Newlyn Railway Station Post Office relocated and now that the name no longer fit sixty residents signed a petition to rename it the Newlyn Post Office. Upon learning of this, 118 residents who were served by Williams' post office opted to keep it as the Newlyn Post Office. The Postmaster-General regardless renamed it Newlyn North, much to some residents' anger. Williams said in a meeting, to laughter, that:

...the residents near the Newlyn station had no more right to grab the name of their [Newlyn] Post Office than the German army had to march, over Belgium.

Newlyn and Newlyn North are 2 kilometres (1.2 mi) away from each other.
