= Campaspe Plains massacre =

Massacre in Victoria, Australia

Date	June 1839
Location	Plains near the Campaspe Creek, Central Victoria 37.101°S 144.413°E
Result	European victory, a massacre

Belligerents
Charles Hutton and Mounted Police	Dja Dja Wurrung, Taungurung unknown clans

Commanders and leaders
Charles Hutton	Unknown

Strength
Unknown	Unknown

Casualties and losses
None	Up to 40 killed in first event, 6 killed, unknown number wounded in second event

The Campaspe Plains massacre in 1839 in Central Victoria, Australia was as a reprisal raid against Aboriginal resistance to the invasion and occupation of the Dja Dja Wurrung and Taungurung lands. Charles Hutton took over the Campaspe run, located near the border of Dja Dja Wurrung and Taungurung, in 1838 following sporadic confrontations.

== Cause ==
In April 1839 five Indigenous people were killed by three white men. In response Hugh Bryan, a shepherd, and James Neill, a hut keeper were killed in May 1839 by Taungurung people, who had robbed a hut of bedding, clothes, guns and ammunition and also ran a flock of 700 sheep off the property, possibly as retribution for the earlier Aboriginal deaths. The Taungurung were enemies of the Dja Dja Wurrung.

== Massacre ==
Hutton immediately put together an armed party of settlers who tracked and finally caught the Aboriginals with a flock of sheep 48 kilometres (30 mi) away near the Campaspe Creek. An armed confrontation between the settlers and Aboriginals occurred for up to half an hour. Hutton claimed privately that nearly 40 Aboriginal people were killed.

The following month Hutton led a party of mounted police and came upon a party of local Dja Dja Wurrung whom Hutton had previously forced off his run, even though these people had been friendly to him since his arrival. The Aboriginal camp near the Campaspe Creek was charged by Hutton and the mounted police with no warning given, with six Dja Dja Wurrung being shot in the back and killed as they tried to flee and others wounded.

Charles Parker, the Assistant Protector of Aborigines for the region, described the massacre as:

...it was a deliberately planned illegal reprisal on the aborigines, conducted on the principle advocated by many persons in this colony, that when any offence is committed by unknown individuals, the tribe to which they belong should be made to suffer for it.

George Robinson described Charles Hutton and his attitude to "the blacks" in his journal of 24 January 1840:

Mr H. avowed [his approach to the natives] to be terror; to keep the natives in subjection by fear, and to punish them wholesale, that is, by tribes and communities. If a member of a tribe offend, destroy the whole. He believed they must be exterminated.

No official action was taken against Hutton.

== See also ==
- List of massacres in Australia
- List of massacres of Indigenous Australians
