= Blood Hole massacre =

Massacre in Victoria, Australia

- Part of Australian frontier wars
- Location: 37.21°S 143.875°E; Middle Creek, 6–7 mi (9.7–11.3 km) from Glengower Station between Clunes and Newstead, Colony of Victoria
- Date: 1839 or 1840
- Target: Dja Dja Wurrung people
- Attack type: Mass murder
- Deaths: Unknown
- Victim: Unknown clan of Dja Dja Wurrung people
- Perpetrators: Captain Dugald McLachlan and employees

The Blood Hole massacre was a massacre of Aboriginal people in the Port Phillip District (later the colony of Victoria, now the Australian state of Victoria, at the end of 1839 or early 1840. The massacre occurred at Middle Creek, 10–11 kilometres (6–7 mi) from Glengower Station, between Clunes and Newstead, killing an unknown number of Djadjawurrung people.

== Background ==
Captain Dugald McLachlan established Glengower Station, sometimes employing local Aboriginal people from the Dja Dja Wurrung (Jaara people). His employees also gave out flour and sugar rations to them on occasion.

After the cook distributed flour laced with plaster of Paris, the party speared the cook in retribution, and ate the meat hanging in the kitchen.

== The massacre ==
Later, Djadjawurrung people from the Grampians district, who had been on their way home after trading goods for green stone axe blanks that they obtained near what is now Lancefield, were found at Middle Creek, a camping place on their trading route from the Grampians to the Greenstone quarry at Mount William near Lancefield.

The Aboriginal people were found at the waterhole on Middle Creek west of Glengower Station. They sought to hide by diving into the waterhole, where they were shot one at a time as they came up for air.
