= Franklinford =

Franklinford Victoria
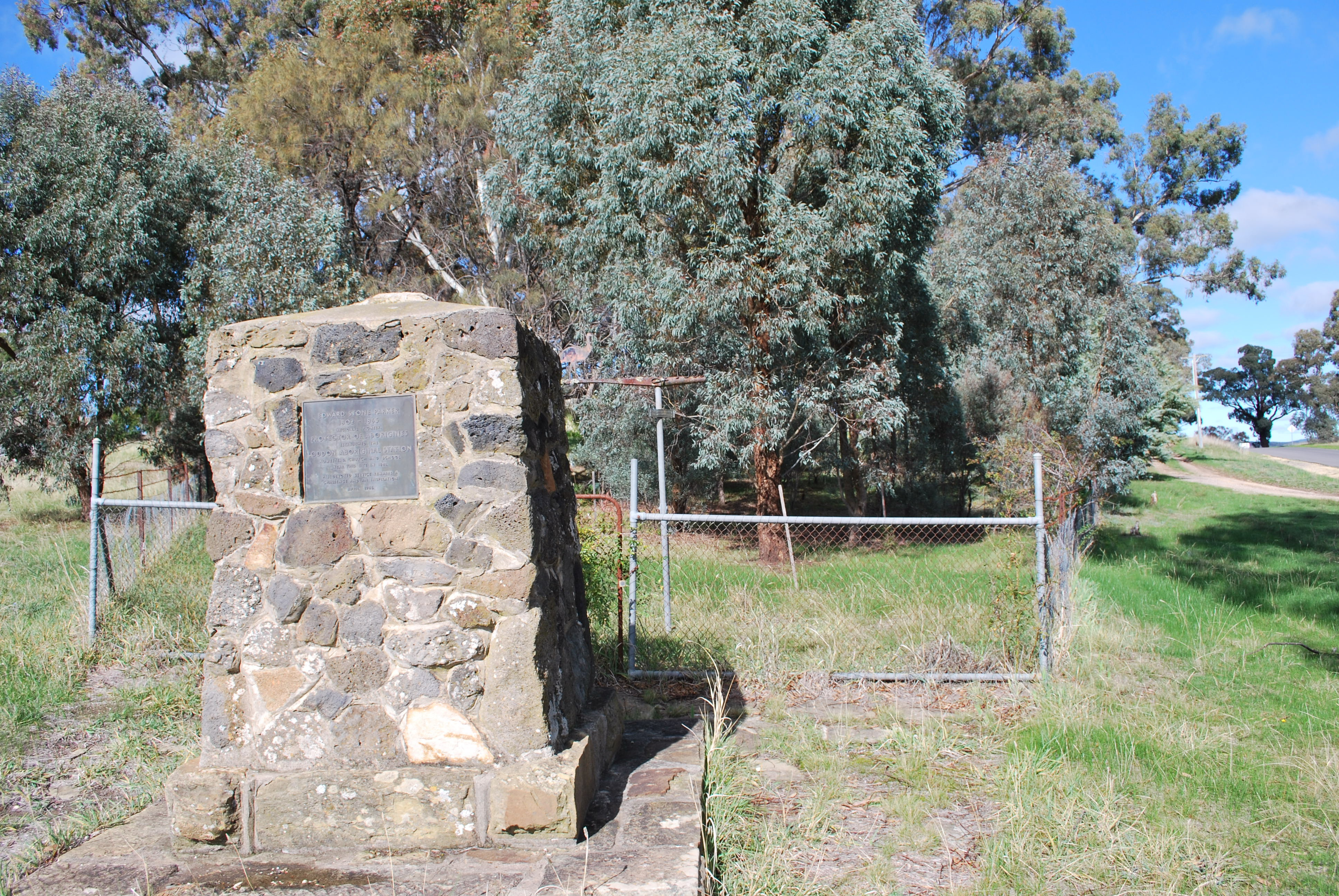
- Monument at Franklinford. It reads "Edward Stone Parker 1802 - 1865 Regional Pioneer Protector of Aboriginies established the Loddon Aboriginal Station, Homestead, Church and School near this site in 1841. His devoted service remains a challenge and inspiration. April 1966."

- Coordinates: 37°14′15″S 144°5′33″E
- Population: 66 (2016 census)
- Postcode(s): 3461
- Location: 100 km (62 mi) NW of Melbourne
- LGA(s): Shire of Hepburn; Mount Alexander Shire

Franklinford is a locality in the Shire of Hepburn and Mount Alexander Shire, Victoria, Australia. At the 2016 census, Franklinford had a population of 66 people.

Franklinford was the site chosen by Edward Stone Parker to build the Loddon Aboriginal Protectorate station at Franklinford in January 1841 which was an important focus of the Dja Dja Wurrung people from 1841 until they were forcibly resettled in 1864. It is located on the Midland Highway.

== History ==
=== Loddon Aboriginal Protectorate Station ===
Mount Franklin was the territory of the Gunangara Gundidj clan of the Dja Dja Wurrung. Ethnographical and archaeological evidence indicates that frequent large ceremonial gatherings took place in the area.

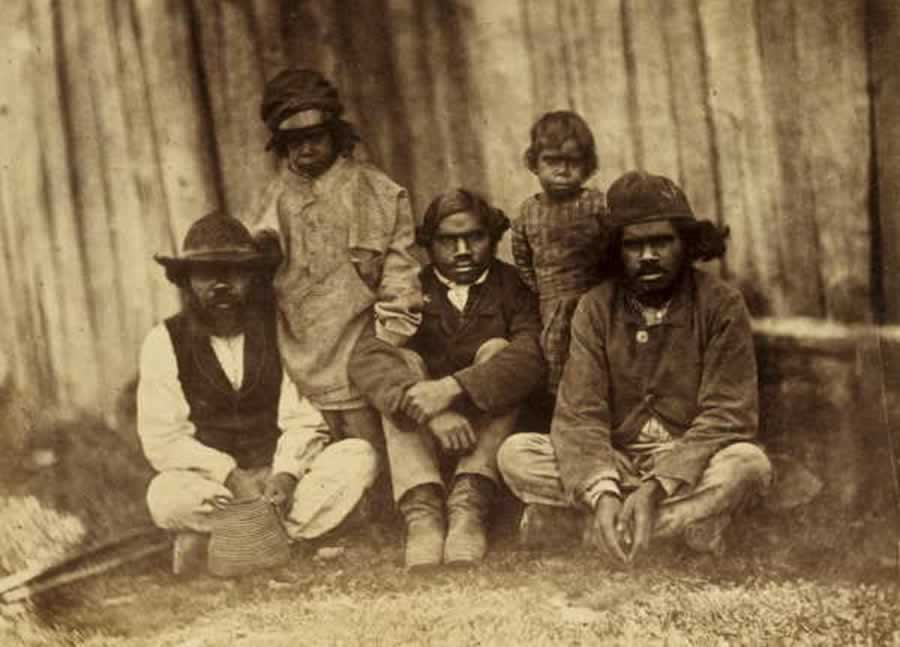
Aboriginal farmers at the Loddon Aboriginal Protectorate at Franklinford, 1858

In January 1841 Parker selected a site on the northern side of Mount Franklin on Jim Crow Creek with permanent spring water. The site was chosen with the support of The Dja Dja Wurrung as well as Crown Lands Commissioner Frederick Powlett. Approval for the site was given in March, and a large number of Dja Dja Wurrung accompanied Parker there in June 1841 when the station was established on William Mollison's Coliban run, where an outstation hut already existed. This became known as the Loddon Aboriginal Protectorate Station at Franklinford, and the area was known to the Dja Dja Wurrung as Larne-ne-barramul or the habitat of the emu. Nearby Mount Franklin was known as Willambeparamal and the creek running from it as Lalgambook.

A Homestead, church, school and several out buildings were initially constructed. The first teacher at the school was Charles Judkins, who died at the station aged 42. Franklinford provided a very important focus for the Dja Dja Wurrung during the 1840s where they received a measure of protection and rations, but they continued with their traditional cultural practices and semi-nomadic lifestyle as much as they could. At times over 200 aborigines congregated at Franklinford.

The protectorate ended on 31 December 1848, with about 20 or 30 Dja Dja Wurrung living at the station at that time. Parker and his family remained living at Franklinford. Six Dja Dja Wurrung men and their families settled at Franklinford, but all but one died from misadventure or respiratory disease. Tommy Farmer was the last survivor of this group who walked off the land in 1864 and joined the Coranderrk reserve.

The Aboriginal Protectorate school at Franklinford was closed in February 1864, with the children and families forcibly resettled at Coranderrk Reserve.

On 26 May 2004 Susan Rankin, a Dja Dja Wurrung elder, peacefully reoccupied crown land at Franklinford in central Victoria, calling her campsite the Going Home Camp. Rankin asked the Victorian Department of Sustainability and Environment to produce documents proving that the Crown has the right to occupy these lands. According to the 2 June 2004 Daylesford Advocate, local DSE officers admitted they "cannot produce these documents and doubt that such documents exist".

=== Franklinford Common School ===
Franklinford Common School was built in the mid-1860s, with the Franklinford Hall listed on the Victorian Heritage list, as one of the few schools of its kind still surviving in its original rural setting. The hall received funding for essential repairs and maintenance from the Victorian State Government in December 2008.

Franklinford Post Office opened on 15 February 1859 and closed in 1969.
