= Western Highway (Victoria) =

Highway in Victoria

Western Highway Western Freeway Victoria
- Coordinates: 36.344105°S 140.967104°E (West end); 37.753196°S 144.730886°E (East end)

General information
- Type: Highway
- Length: 419 km (260 mi)
- Gazetted: December 1913 (as Main Road); July 1925 (as State Highway)
- Route number(s): A8 (2013–present) (VIC/SA border–Buangor); M8 (2013–present) (Buangor–Derrimut)
- Former route number: National Highway A8 (1997–2013) (VIC/SA border–Burrumbeet); National Highway M8 (1997–2013) (Burrumbeet–Derrimut); National Highway 8 (1974–1997) (VIC/SA border–Deer Park); National Route 8 (1955–1974) (VIC/SA border–Deer Park)

Major junctions
- West end: Dukes Highway; VIC/SA border
- Borung Highway; Henty Highway; Wimmera Highway; Pyrenees Highway; Sunraysia Highway; Midland Highway; Melton Highway; Ballarat Road
- East end: Western Ring Road; Derrimut, Melbourne

Location(s)
- Region: Grampians, Greater Melbourne
- Major settlements: Nhill, Dimboola, Horsham, Stawell, Ararat, Beaufort, Ballarat, Ballan, Bacchus Marsh, Melton, Rockbank, Caroline Springs

Highway system
- Highways in Australia; National Highway • Freeways in Australia; Highways in Victoria

Western Highway is a major arterial route in western Victoria with a length of approximately 258 kilometres (160 mi) of single carriageway, then 161 kilometres (100 mi) of dual carriageway known as Western Freeway, linking the western suburbs of Melbourne to the border with South Australia at Serviceton. It is the Victorian part of the principal route linking the Australian cities of Melbourne and Adelaide, and is a part of the National Highway network, designated routes A8 and M8. The western end continues into South Australia as Dukes Highway, the next section of the Melbourne–Adelaide National Highway.

Western Highway is the second-busiest national highway in Australia, in terms of freight movements, with over five million tonnes annually, and provides the link between the eastern seaboard and South Australia and Western Australia.

== Route ==
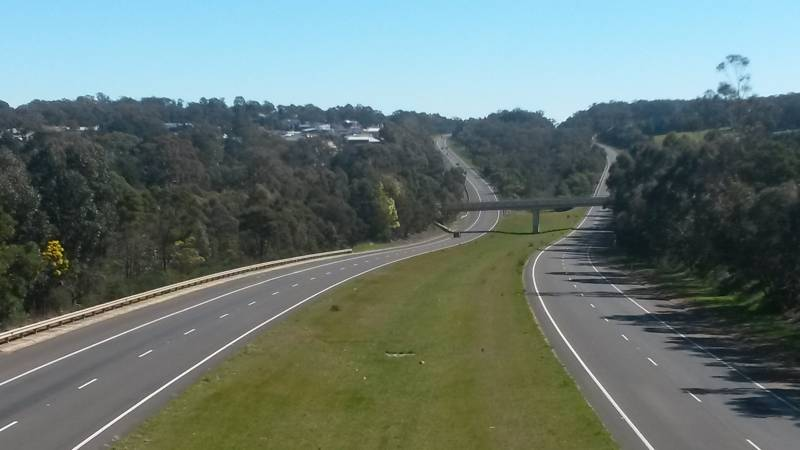
A view of the Western Freeway (M8) at Nerrina looking west toward Doodts Road, Ballarat North and Invermay from the Nerrina pedestrian overpass.

Western Highway commences at the state border with South Australia as a continuation of Dukes Highway at Victoria and heads in a south-easterly direction as a two-lane, single carriageway rural highway with numerous overtaking lanes and passes through the agricultural centres of Nhill, Horsham, Stawell and Ararat. Just west of Buangor, Western Highway becomes Western Freeway and widens to a four-lane, dual-carriageway road, and begins bypassing most of the towns the old alignment of the highway used to serve, passing Ballarat, Ballan and Bacchus Marsh, before reaching the western fringes of suburban Melbourne outside Melton; major intersecting roads are grade-separated, however there remain minor intersections at-grade, and cycling is permitted on the sealed shoulder along most of the freeway. The freeway continues through the suburbs of Rockbank and Ravenhall, before eventually terminating at the interchange with Western Ring Road in Derrimut.

Plans are underway for the end of this freeway to be extended from the current terminus just after the Buangor bypass westward towards and eventually to Stawell.

== History ==
The passing of the Country Roads Act 1912 through the Parliament of Victoria provided for the establishment of the Country Roads Board (later VicRoads) and their ability to declare Main Roads, taking responsibility for the management, construction and care of the state's major roads from local municipalities. (Main) Ballarat Road was declared a Main Road, from Footscray via Braybrook to Melton on 30 December 1913, and from Melton via Bacchus Marsh, Ballan and Bungaree to Ballarat East on 24 August 1914; Horsham (-Dimboola) Road from Horsham to Dimboola, (Dimboola-) Nhill Road between Dimboola and Nhill and Nhill-Kaniva-Border Road between Nhill through Kaniva to the South Australian border, were declared as Main Roads on 17 March 1915; Ballarat-(Ararat-)Stawell Road between Ballarat West through Beaufort and Ararat to Stawell was declared a Main Road on 31 May 1915.

The passing of the Highways and Vehicles Act 1924 provided for the declaration of State Highways, roads two-thirds financed by the state government through the Country Roads Board. Western Highway was declared a State Highway on 1 July 1925, cobbled from a collection of roads from Melbourne through Ballarat, Ararat, Stawell, Horsham, and Dimboola to the interstate border at Serviceton (for a total of 244 miles), subsuming the original declarations of Main Ballarat Road, Ballarat-Stawell Road, Horsham-Dimboola Road, Dimboola-Nhill Road, and Nhill-Kaniva-Border Road as Main Roads. Western By-pass Road was opened in 1969 through Pykes Creek Reservoir, but this was being referred to as Western Freeway by the time the Gordon and Bacchus Marsh bypasses were completed in 1972.

The Whitlam government introduced the federal National Roads Act 1974, where roads declared as a National Highway were still the responsibility of the states for road construction and maintenance, but were fully compensated by the federal government for money spent on approved projects. As an important interstate link between the capitals of Victoria and South Australia, Western Highway was declared a National Highway in 1974.

The passing of the Road Management Act 2004 granted the responsibility of overall management and development of Victoria's major arterial roads to VicRoads: in 2004, VicRoads re-declared the road as Western Highway (Arterial #6520) between the border with South Australia at Serviceton and Buangor, and as Western Freeway (Freeway #1520) between Buangor and Western Ring Road, Derrimut.

Western Highway was signed as National Route 8 in 1955, then as National Highway 8 when upgraded to a National Highway in 1974. With Victoria's conversion to the newer alphanumeric system in the late 1990s, the section between Burrumbeet and Ardeer (where it met the Western Ring Road) was re-signed as National Highway M8, and between Burrumbeet and the border as National Highway A8; it was left as National Highway 8 east of the ring road along its original alignment into central Melbourne. Once the Deer Park bypass was opened in 2009, National Route M8 was re-routed onto the new bypass and the old alignment of Western Highway between Ravenhall and Footscray was re-declared as Ballarat Road and replaced with Metropolitan Route 8; VicRoads altered National Highway M8 to route M8 and National Highway A8 to route A8 in 2013, bringing their design in line with the rest of the state. Route M8 was extended further west when the next section of converted freeway to Buangor opened in 2016. Former alignments of Western Highway are generally designated sequentially from route C801 to C805, or as Metropolitan Route 8 (within suburban Melbourne).

The newest sections of freeway-standard dual carriageway opened on 6 March 2015 for the Ballarat to Beaufort section (running 25 kilometres (16 mi) in length), and on 17 April 2016 for the Beaufort to Buangor section (running 21 kilometres (13 mi) in length). The first section runs between the end of the Ballarat bypass between a new interchange with the Avenue of Remembrance (route C805) in Burrumbeet to just outside the eastern side Beaufort (including a bypass of Trawalla) providing 156 kilometres (97 mi) of freeway standard road between Melbourne and Beaufort. The second section runs between just outside the western side of Beaufort to just after the Buangor bypass, where it becomes a single carriageway again running all the way to Ararat, providing a further 21 kilometres (13 mi) of freeway standard between Beaufort and just beyond Buangor.

The Melbourne section of Western Highway is shown in the 1969 Melbourne Transportation Plan as part of the F12 Freeway corridor.

== Upgrades and realignments ==
=== Timeline of duplication ===
- 1964/65 – Ballarat East. 2.4 miles (3.9 km) of duplicate carriageway completed east of Ballarat. No exact date given. Now part of route C805 leading from Western Freeway into Ballarat from the east.
- 1966/67 – Kororoit Creek to Deer Park. 1.14 miles (1.83 km) of dual carriageways completed during financial year 1966/67, including a duplicate bridge over Kororoit Creek. Now part of Ballarat Road.
- 1966/67 – Deer Park to Rockbank. 7.12 miles (11.46 km) of dual carriageways completed during financial year 1966/67. Part of this is now Ballarat Road through Deer Park and Caroline Springs.
- 1966/67 – Dual carriageways from Djerriwarrh Creek to Coimadai Creek completed during financial year 1966/67. Now part of Bacchus Marsh Road between Melton and Bacchus Marsh.
- 1966/67 – Dual carriageways 1.83 miles (2.95 km) east of Pykes Creek Reservoir completed during financial year 1966/67.
- 1967/68 – Rockbank to Melton East. Construction completed of over 3 miles (4.8 km) of dual carriageways during financial year 1967/68.
- 1969 – Pykes Creek Reservoir: Western By-pass Road is completed, running four miles east and west of Pykes Creek Reservoir.
- 1972 – Bacchus Marsh bypass. 5.88 miles (9.46 km) opened 30 June 1972, by the Hon. Sir Henry Bolte, GCMG, MP, at a cost of A$4.3m.
- 1972 – Gordon section. 5.74 miles (9.24 km) opened 5 May 1972, by the Board's chairman, Mr R E V Donaldson, at a cost of A$2.2m.
- 1973 – Pentland Hills to Myrniong section. 1 mile (1.6 km) completed from Korkuperrimul Creek to the Lion Park interchange, early 1973.
- 1974 – Pentland Hills section. 4.8 kilometres (3.0 mi) ‘west of Bacchus Marsh’ opened 1974.
- 1975 – Myrniong bypass opened 3 October 1975, by the Minister for Transport, the Hon. E. R. Meagher, CBE, ED, at a cost of A$3.28m. The 5.9 kilometres (3.7 mi) bypass of Myrniong completed '80 km of the 100km between Melbourne and Ballarat [as] dual carriageways'.
- 1978 – Ballan bypass. 8.4 kilometres (5.2 mi) opened 15 June 1978, by the Hon. J. A. Rafferty, Minister for Transport, at a cost of A$9.8m.
- 1983 – Wallace and Bungaree bypass opened 9 March 1983, by the Premier of Victoria, the Hon. John Cain MP. The 11.9 kilometres (7.4 mi) bypass cost A$23.6m.
- 1987 – Melton bypass. The 'freeway work' was opened to traffic on 7 July 1987, with the remainder of works expected to be completed by April 1988. The 8.8 kilometres (5.5 mi) bypass cost A$44.2m.
- 1989 – 5.6 km bypass of Dimboola opened in May.
- 1993 – Ballarat bypass: The first stage, a single carriageway section from Woodmans Hill to Midland Highway, is opened in December 1993, at a cost of A$62m.
- 1994 – Ballarat bypass: The second stage of the initial 26 kilometres (16 mi) single carriageway by-pass is opened to traffic in December 1994.
- 1995 – Ballarat bypass: Second carriageway opened to traffic between Woodmans Hill and Gillies Street in December 1995, at a cost of A$25m.
- 1998 – Ballarat bypass: The final section opened in February 1998, featuring the duplication of the original single carriageway bypass from Gillies Street to Sunraysia Highway.
- 2001 – The new elevated Hopkins Road Interchange was opened to traffic on 12 July 2001, at a cost of $13.1 million. Before the construction of the new interchange, the intersection of Hopkins Road (Melton-Werribee Road) with Western Freeway at Rockbank was improved using Black Spot Program funds in 1989 and 1991, but a long-term solution to the congestion and crashes at this location was the construction of an elevated interchange.
- 2009 – Deer Park bypass opened to traffic on 5 April 2009, at a cost of A$331m, jointly funded by the state and federal governments. In conjunction with these works, the new Leakes Road interchange at Rockbank was opened in August 2008. This provided a freeway interchange onto the Western Ring Road.
- 2011 – Anthony's Cutting realignment. A new 5-kilometre (3.1 mi) realignment constructed to the south of the previous section of highway, bypassing the steep grades and tight curves of the old alignment between Melton and Bacchus Marsh. The A$200m project was ‘mostly’ open to traffic in June 2011.
- 2013 – Ballarat to Burrumbeet. 8 kilometres (5.0 mi) duplication opened to traffic 31 January 2013.
- 2015 – Burrumbeet to Beaufort opened to traffic on 18 February 2015 adding a further 26 kilometres (16 mi) of dual carriageway and includes a bypass of Trawalla however the highway still passes through both Burrumbeet (as dual carriageway) and Beaufort (as single carriageway).
- 2016 – Beaufort to Buangor opened to traffic in April 2016 adding a further 21 kilometres (13 mi) of dual carriageway to the existing freeway, which includes the Buangor bypass.

=== Deer Park Bypass ===
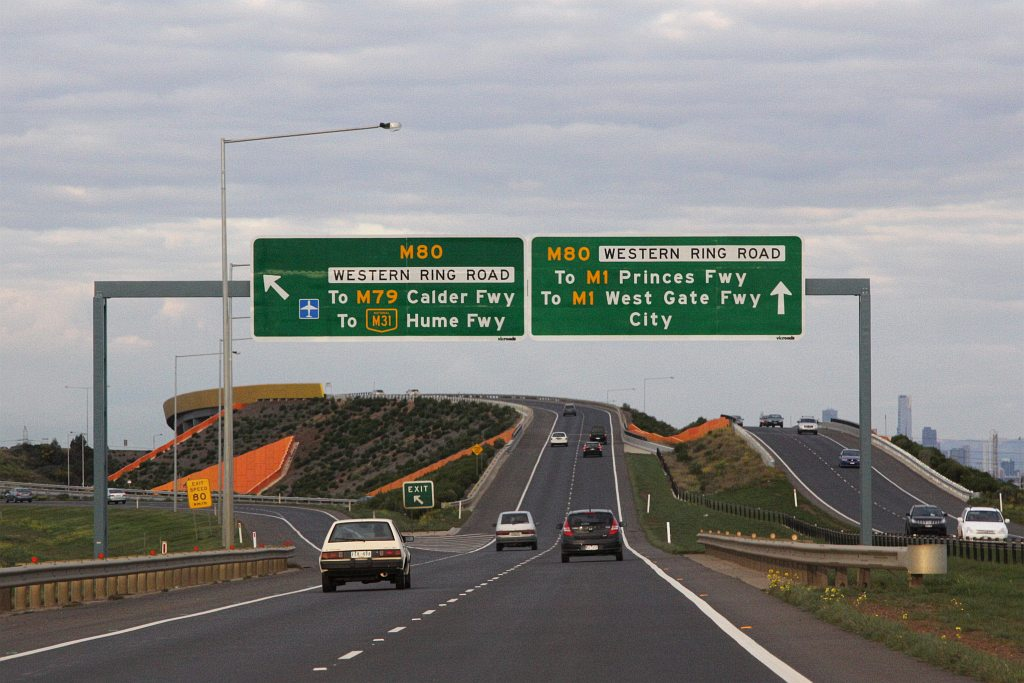
Eastbound on the Deer Park Bypass approaching the Western Ring Road interchange

The Deer Park Bypass opened on 5 April 2009 in the western suburbs of Melbourne. The freeway links Western Freeway at Ravenhall and the Western Ring Road in Derrimut. This 9.3 kilometre freeway was estimated to cost A$333 million which also includes a grade separated (or "full diamond") interchange at Leakes Road in Rockbank.

The purpose of the freeway bypass is to move traffic off Ballarat Road, which leads to the Western Ring Road. Due to the strong population growth of about 8.7 per cent and subdivision in Deer Park and Sunshine, the surrounding suburbs and the seven traffic signals between the Western Ring Road and the start of Western Freeway, substantial long and very frustrating delays were created for the 70,000 vehicles per day with 10 per cent of this consisting of heavy vehicles.

The bypass had been proposed since the completion of the Western Ring Road, the project stalled due to funding quarrels between the Federal and State Governments. In 2004, the Federal government announced that the Deer Park Bypass would be built as part of a $1.4 billion project "package grant" to Victoria. It was anticipated that more than 15 min of travel time would be saved when travelling through Deer Park, via Ballarat Road. Construction started on the Deer Park bypass in August 2006, work being carried out as a joint venture by Leighton Contractors and VicRoads, in construction with two contracts. The first stage, allowing westbound traffic over the new bridge at the Ravenhall end of the new freeway, opened in December 2007.

It was announced on 4 March 2009 that the Deer Park Bypass would open in early April 2009, with the new freeway link on track to open more than eight months ahead of schedule. On that day, Roads and Ports Minister Tim Pallas and Federal Member for Gorton Brendan O'Connor MP inspected works from the new bridge over the Ring Road at Sunshine West and Tim Pallas announced that the $331 million Deer Park Bypass would open to the public on Sunday 5 April 2009.

=== Anthony's Cutting realignment ===
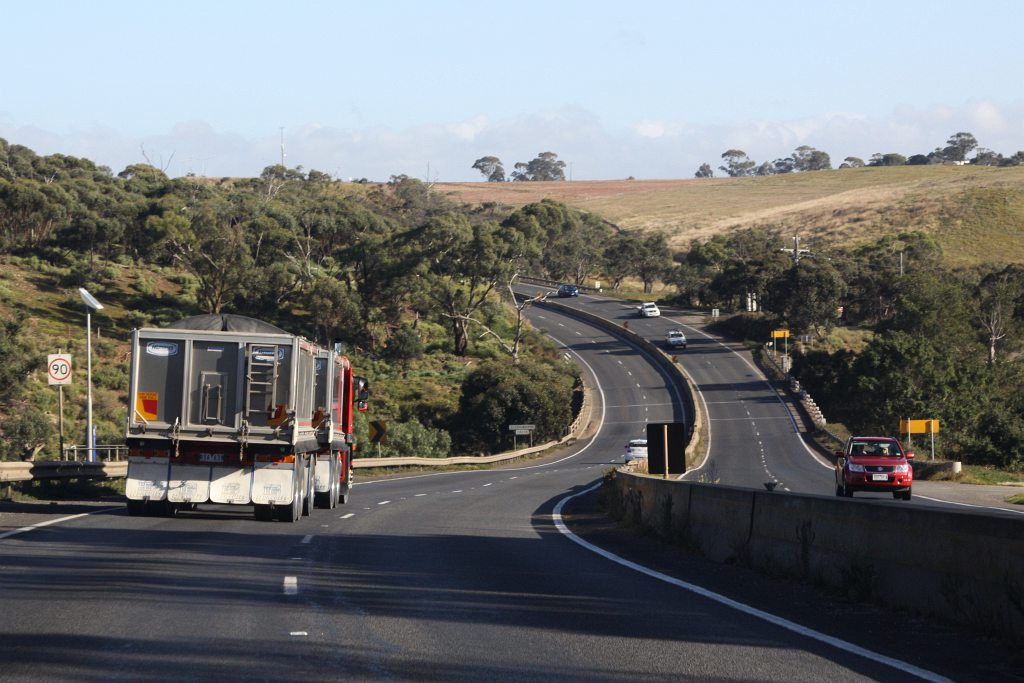
Alignment of the road over Djerriwarrh Creek, before the opening of the Anthony's Cutting realignment

The section of road through Anthony's Cutting between Bacchus Marsh and Melton was one of the most dangerous sections of the route, and was not of modern freeway standard. The steep hills and tight curves along the 5 kilometre long stretch of road resulted in 21 serious crashes in the five years to 2010. More than 29,000 vehicles, including more than 4000 freight vehicles, travelled the highway section daily. The new route opened to traffic on 27 June 2011, nine months ahead of schedule.

The project included:

- Extension of Woolpack Road north from Bacchus Marsh Road to a new interchange on Western Freeway, including a bridge over the Lerderderg River.
- An overpass carrying Bulmans Road over the existing Western Freeway.
- An overpass taking Hopetoun Park Road across the new freeway, with Melbourne-bound on and off ramps.
- Freeway bridges spanning Djerriwarrh Creek, and Cowans Road / Pyrites Creek.

The original project scope included a diamond interchange at Bulmans Road that has not been built, while the ramps at Hopetoun Park Road were not included but was later added. The extension of Woolpack Road has been delayed due to controversy over need to clear trees in the heritage listed Avenue of Honour at Bacchus Marsh.

Realignment of the road through this section had been proposed far back as 2001, when a group of 10 local councils said the realignment could cost just $65 million to build. By 2006 the cost was estimated to be $85 million, with federal Roads Minister Jim Lloyd stating that the project would receive serious consideration for funding in the 2009 AusLink document, subject to support from the State Government. Construction commenced in February 2010, funded by $160 million from the Australian Government and $40 million from the Victorian Government.

=== Armstrong deviation ===
In 2001 work started on a 4.2 kilometre long deviation at Armstrong (on the Adelaide side of Ararat), involving 200,000 cubic metres of earthworks and a new bridge over the main Melbourne–Adelaide railway. Previously high vehicles could not travel under the rail overpass and were forced to detour around it, in addition the poor road conditions led to a number of accidents and fatalities. Costing $6.1 million the work was completed by 2003.

== Future upgrades ==
As of 2017, several at-grade intersections remained on the "freeway", particularly in the areas near Rockbank and at Woodmans Hill just to the east of Ballarat.

- Proposed upgrade and safety improvements Rockbank to Melton, to be funded by Auslink 2 (2009–2014).
- Proposed extension west from the current freeway terminus in the Melbourne side of Beaufort West through to Ararat and eventually to Stawell, also part of Auslink 2. Beaufort to Buangor was completed in April 2016. Buangor Bypass completed in mid-2016, and Buangor to Ararat was expected to start in early 2017.

Duplication of Western Highway between Ballarat and Stawell was proposed to be completed between 2009 and 2014, to be funded by Auslink 2. At the end of 2016, some parts were still in early planning, including the bypasses at Beaufort and Ararat.

The clearing of wide swathes of the ancient red gums by VicRoads near Beaufort resulted in expressions of community concern, including public meetings. In 2015, two women chained themselves to a red gum tree for 4½ hours near Buangor, 74 kilometres (46 miles) west of Ballarat, to draw attention to the issue. Isabel Mackenzie, a long-term resident of the area, said she was concerned at the environmental impact of removing trees that are hundreds of years old. Helen Lewers said that VicRoads should reroute the highway between Buangor and Stawell to preserve the native roadside vegetation.

=== Western Freeway upgrades between Melton and Caroline Springs ===
In September 2026, the Victorian Labor Party has announced an upgrade of the Western Freeway between Melton and Caroline Springs at a cost of $550 million. The upgrades includes 30 km (19 mi) of new lanes in both directions including adding a third lane between Ferris Road and Hopkins Road and adding a fourth lane between Hopkins Road and Ballarat Road. Interchanges at Hopkins Road, Ferris Road and Leakes Road will also be upgraded as part of the project.

A new half interchange for the Ballarat-bound exit ramp and Melbourne-bound entry ramp will be provided at Mount Cottrell Road as part of the project. Temporary traffic lights will be installed at the Leakes Road Interchange as part of the community feedback and will be fully operational by early 2027.

== Exits and major intersections ==
State	LGA	Location	km	mi	Destinations	Notes
South Australia	Tatiara	Wolseley	419	260	Dukes Highway (A8) – Bordertown, Tailem Bend, Adelaide	Southeastern terminus of Dukes Highway, route A8 continues east
State border			419	260	South Australia – Victoria state border	
Victoria	West Wimmera	Kaniva	419	260	Western Highway (A8)	Western terminus of Western Highway
Victoria	West Wimmera	Kaniva	394	245	Melbourne–Adelaide railway	
Victoria	West Wimmera	Kaniva	392	244	Kaniva–Edenhope Road (C208) – Edenhope	
Victoria	Hindmarsh	Nhill	356	221	Nhill–Harrow Road (C206) – Harrow	
Victoria	Hindmarsh	Nhill	354	220	Nhill–Yanac Road (C225) – Yanac	
Victoria	Hindmarsh	Nhill	353	219	Nhill–Netherby Road (C224) – Netherby	
Victoria	Hindmarsh	Nhill	352	219	Nhill–Jeparit Road (C223) – Jeparit	
Victoria	Wimmera River		322	200	Bridge (no known official name)	
Victoria	Hindmarsh	Dimboola	318	198	Dimboola–Rainbow Road (C227) – Jeparit, Rainbow, Dimboola	
Victoria	Hindmarsh	Dimboola	318	198	Melbourne–Adelaide railway	
Victoria	Hindmarsh	Dimboola	315	196	Borung Highway (C234) – Warracknabeal, Donald	
Victoria	Hindmarsh	Dimboola	314	195	Horsham Road (C227) – Dimboola	
Victoria	Horsham	Wail	306	190	Melbourne–Adelaide railway	
Victoria	Horsham	Horsham	280	170	Blue Ribbon Road (C231) – Wallup	
Victoria	Horsham	Horsham	280	170	Henty Highway (B200/B240) – Warracknabeal, St Arnaud, Mildura	Northern terminus for concurrency with A200 and B240 through Horsham
Victoria	Horsham	Horsham	279	173	Wimmera Highway (B240) – Edenhope, Naracoorte	Southern terminus for concurrency with B240
Victoria	Wimmera River		278	173	Bridge (no known official name)	
Victoria	Horsham	Horsham	278	173	Horsham–Lubeck Road (C215) – Longerenong, Drung	
Victoria	Horsham	Horsham	277	172	Henty Highway (A200) – Hamilton, Portland	Southern terminus for concurrency with A200
Victoria	Horsham	Bungalally	266	165	Ballyglunin North Road (C215) – Drung, Longerenong	
Victoria	Horsham	Drung	263	163	Northern Grampians Road (C222) – Halls Gap	
Victoria	Northern Grampians	Deep Lead	226	140	Stawell–Warracknabeal Road (B210) – Glenorchy, Warracknabeal	
Victoria	Northern Grampians	Stawell	215	134	Grampians Road (C216) – Halls Gap	
Victoria	Northern Grampians	Stawell	214	133	Pomonal Road (C221) – Pomonal, Avoca	
Victoria	Northern Grampians	Stawell	211	131	London Road (C238) – Stawell, to Donald–Stawell Road – Donald	
Victoria	Northern Grampians	Great Western	203	126	Melbourne–Adelaide railway	
Victoria	Ararat	Ararat	185	115	Pyrenees Highway (B180) – Glenthompson, Avoca, Maryborough, Castlemaine	
Victoria	Ararat	Ararat	183	114	Ararat–Halls Gap Road (C222) – Pomonal, Halls Gap	
Victoria	Ararat	Ararat	183	114	Melbourne–Adelaide railway (level crossing)	
Victoria	Ararat	Buangor	168	104	Melbourne–Adelaide railway	
Victoria	Ararat	Buangor	161	100	Buangor–Ben Nevis Road – Buangor, Bayindeen	Eastern terminus of Western Highway and route A8; Western terminus of Western Freeway and route M8
Victoria	Pyrenees	Beaufort	143	89	Melbourne–Adelaide railway	
Victoria	Pyrenees	Beaufort	141	88	Beaufort–Lexton Road (C172 north) – Lexton, Talbot; Skipton Road (C172 south) – Skipton	
Victoria	Ballarat	Burrumbeet	114	71	Remembrance Drive (Ballarat–Burrumbeet Road) (C805) – Burrumbeet, Ballarat	
Victoria	Ballarat	Windermere	113	70	Melbourne–Adelaide railway	
Victoria	Ballarat	Miners Rest–Mitchell Park boundary	109	68	Sunraysia Highway (B220) – Avoca, St Arnaud, Donald, Ouyen	
Victoria	Ballarat	Miners Rest–Mitchell Park boundary	107	66	Ballarat–Maryborough Road (C287) – Ballarat, Maryborough	
Victoria	Ballarat	Wendouree–Mount Rowan boundary	105	65	Gillies Road (C307) – Wendouree, Clunes	Westbound exit and eastbound entry only
Victoria	Ballarat	Wendouree–Mount Rowan boundary	103	64	Midland Highway (A300) – Bendigo, Castlemaine, Creswick, Geelong	
Victoria	Ballarat	Brown Hill	97	60	Ballarat–Daylesford Road (C292) – Brown Hill, Daylesford	
Victoria	Ballarat	Warrenheip–Brown Hill boundary	95	59	Victoria Street (Ballarat–Burrumbeet Road) (C805) – Ballarat, Burrumbeet	Westbound exit and eastbound entry only
Victoria	Ballarat	Warrenheip	92	57	Brewery Tap Road (north) – Gong Gong; Old Melbourne Road (south) – Dunnstown	At-grade
Victoria	Moorabool	Leigh Creek	88	55	Black Swamp Road (north) – Bullarook; Forbes Road (south) – Leigh Creek, Kryal Castle	At-grade
Victoria	Moorabool	Leigh Creek	87	54	Bungaree–Wallace Road (C804) – Bungaree	At-grade
Victoria	Moorabool	Bungaree–Springbank boundary	77	48	Ormond Road (north) – Springbank; Bungaree–Wallace Road (C291/C804 south) – Wallace, Creswick	
Victoria	Moorabool	Gordon	72	45	Moorabol West Road (north) – Bunding; Brougham Street (south) – Gordon	Westbound exit via Butter Factory Road
Victoria	Moorabool	Ballan	62	39	Ballan–Daylesford Road (C141) – Ballan, Daylesford	
Victoria	Moorabool	Ballan	59	37		BP Service Centre
Victoria	Moorabool	Ballan	57	35	Old Melbourne Road (C803) – Ballan	
Victoria	Moorabool	Myrniong	51	32	Greendale–Myrniong Road (C318) – Greendale, Kyneton	
Victoria	Moorabool	Myrniong–Pentland Hills boundary	45	28	Pentland Hills Road – Pentland Hills	
Victoria	Moorabool	Pentland Hills	42	26	Pentland Hills Road (north) – Pentland Hills; Mortons Road (south) – Pentland Hills	Eastbound exit and westbound entrance only
Victoria	Moorabool	Darley–Bacchus Marsh boundary	40	25	Bacchus Marsh Road (C802) – Bacchus Marsh	Westbound exit and eastbound entrance only
Victoria	Moorabool	Darley–Bacchus Marsh boundary	39	24	Halletts Way – Bacchus Marsh	Eastbound exit and westbound entrance only
Victoria	Moorabool	Darley–Bacchus Marsh boundary	38	24	Bacchus Marsh–Gisborne Road (C704) – Geelong, Gisborne	
Victoria	Lerderderg River		37	23	Bridge (no known official name)	
Victoria	Moorabool	Bacchus Marsh–Merrimu boundary	33	21	Old Western Highway (east) – Melton; Bacchus Marsh Road (C802 west) – Bacchus Marsh	Westbound and eastbound exits only
Victoria	Moorabool	Hopetoun Park	31	19	Hopetoun Park Road – Hopetoun Park	Eastbound exit and westbound entrance only
Victoria	Melton	Brookfield–Melton–Melton West–Melton South quadripoint	25	16	Coburns Road (C801) – Exford, Melton	
Victoria	Melton	Melton–Cobblebank boundary	22	14	Ferris Road (Melton Highway) (C754/C801) – Melton, Gisborne, Taylors Lakes	
Victoria	Melton	Rockbank	16	9.9	Leakes Road – Rockbank, Plumpton	
Victoria	Melton	Rockbank	11	6.8	Hopkins Road (C702) – Werribee, Diggers Rest	
Victoria	Melton	Ravenhall	8	5.0	Ballarat Road (Metro Route 8) – Deer Park, Sunshine, Footscray	Eastbound entrance and westbound exit only
Victoria	Melton	Ravenhall	7	4.3	Christies Road – Caroline Springs	Westbound entrance and eastbound exit only
Victoria	Brimbank	Derrimut	1	0.62	Robinsons Road (A91) – Tarneit, Burnside	
Victoria	Brimbank	Derrimut–Sunshine West boundary	0	0.0	Western Ring Road (M80/Tourist Route 21) – Geelong, Seymour, Melbourne Airport	Eastern terminus of Western Freeway and route M8
1.000 mi = 1.609 km; 1.000 km = 0.621 mi: Concurrency terminus; Incomplete access; Route transition

== See also ==
- Ballarat Road
- Dukes Highway
- Freeways in Australia
- Freeways in Victoria
- Road transport in Victoria
