= Shire of Bungaree =

Coordinates: 37°33′S 143°57′E

Shire of Bungaree Victoria
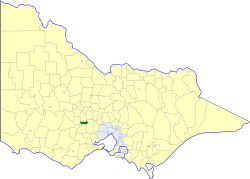
- Location in Victoria
- The Shire of Bungaree as at its dissolution in 1994
- Population: 4,900 (1992)
  - Density: 21.49/km^{2} (55.7/sq mi)
- Established: 1863
- Area: 228 km^{2} (88.0 sq mi)
- Council seat: Leigh Creek
- Region: Grampians
- County: Grant, Talbot, Grenville, Ripon
LGAs around Shire of Bungaree:
Ballarat	Creswick	Daylesford and Glenlyon
Ballarat	Shire of Bungaree	Ballan
Ballaarat	Buninyong	Ballan

The Shire of Bungaree was a local government area northeast of the regional city of Ballarat, Victoria, Australia. The shire covered an area of 228 square kilometres (88.0 sq mi) and existed from 1863 until 1994.

== History ==
Bungaree was first incorporated as a road district on 16 January 1863 and became a shire on 27 January 1871. The shire was originally divided into three ridings in August 1879, but after it lost a small section to the City of Ballaarat on 31 March 1930, it was redivided into two ridings. All divisions were abolished on 6 August 1988, and the council, from then until its dissolution, had nine councillors.

On 6 May 1994, the Shire of Bungaree was abolished, and along with parts of the Shire of Buninyong, was merged into the newly created Shire of Moorabool.

== Towns and localities ==
- Brown Hill
- Bullarook
- Bungaree
- Chapel Flat
- Claretown
- Clarkes Hill
- Glen Park
- Gong Gong
- Invermay
- Leigh Creek*
- Nerrina
- Pootilla
- Wallace

* Council seat.

== Population ==
Year	Population
1954	1,966
1958	2,090*
1961	2,049
1966	2,206
1971	2,514
1976	3,130
1981	3,690
1986	4,087
1991	4,573

* Estimate in 1958 Victorian Year Book.
