= Bungaree, Victoria =

Bungaree
- Town
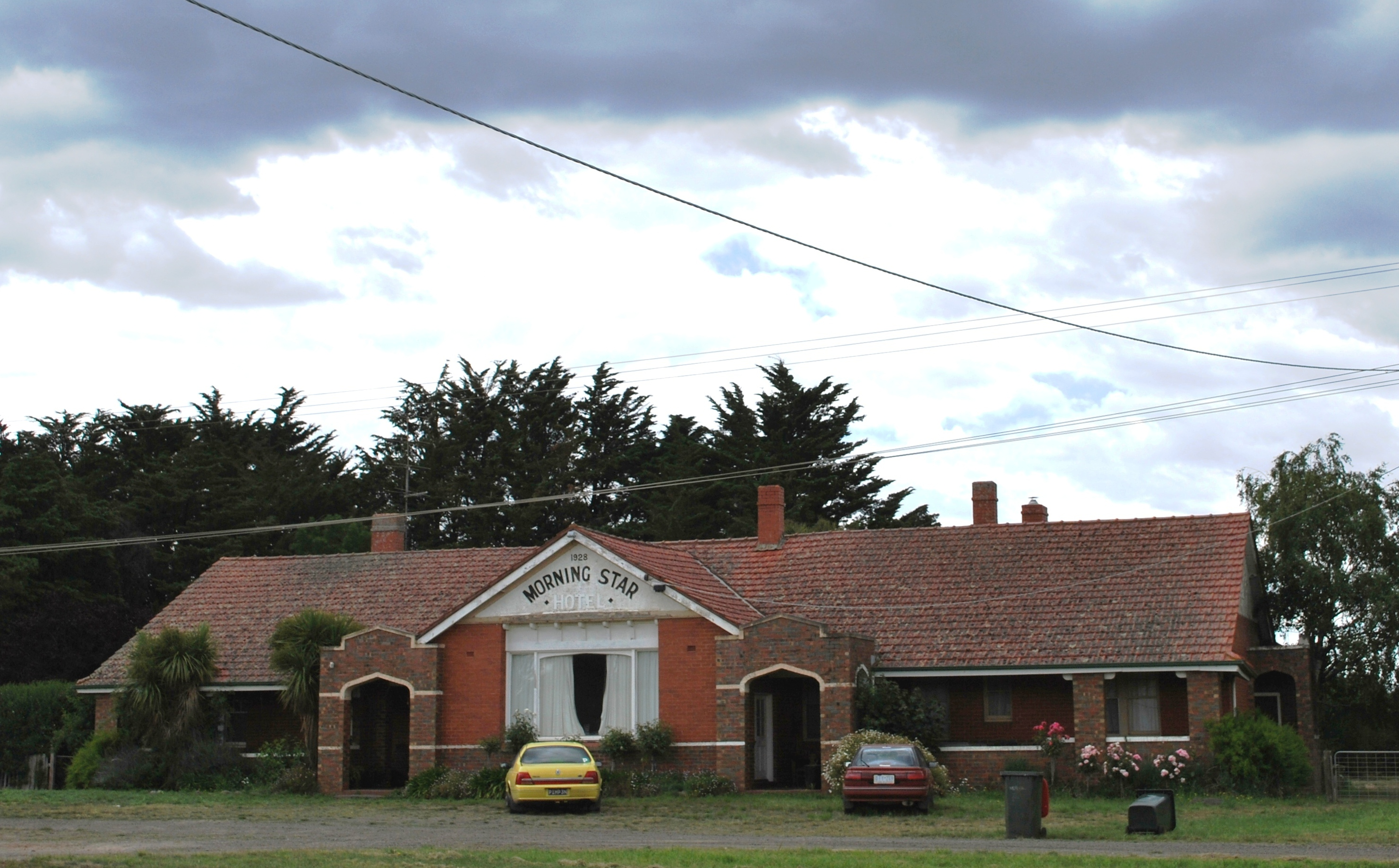
- The former Morning Star Hotel, 2008

- Coordinates: 37°33′26″S 144°00′16″E
- Country: Australia
- State: Victoria
- LGA: Shire of Moorabool
- Location: 11 km (6.8 mi) E of Ballarat; 90 km (56 mi) W of Melbourne

Government
  - State electorate: Eureka
  - Federal division: Ballarat

Population
  - Total: 302 (2021 census)
- Postcode: 3352
Localities around Bungaree
Pootilla	Bullarook	Claretown; Springbank
Leigh Creek	Bungaree	Wallace
Dunnstown	Dunnstown	Millbrook

Bungaree is a town in Victoria, Australia. It is 103 kilometres (64 mi) west of the state capital, Melbourne and 14 kilometres (8.7 mi) east of the regional centre of Ballarat, in the Shire of Moorabool local government area. The Western Highway once ran through the town, but it has been replaced by a freeway which bypasses the town to the north. At the 2021 census, Bungaree and the surrounding area had a population of 302.

Bungaree post office was opened on 1 August 1863. The town is home to the Bungaree Demons, who play in the Central Highlands Football Netball League.

The Quinlan, Frawley and Steenhuis families are prominent in Bungaree, in particular, the prominent former AFL player Danny Frawley.

== See also ==
- Bungaree railway station, Victoria
