= Millbrook, Victoria =

Millbrook Victoria
- Coordinates: 37°36′13″S 144°02′53″E
- Population: 156 (2016 census)
- Postcode(s): 3352
- Location: 17 km (11 mi) E of Ballarat; 84 km (52 mi) NW of Melbourne
- LGA(s): Shire of Moorabool
- State electorate(s): Eureka
- Federal division(s): Ballarat
Suburbs around Millbrook:
Bungaree	Wallace	Gordon
Dunnstown	Millbrook	Gordon; Mount Egerton
Yendon	Lal Lal	Mount Egerton

Millbrook is a locality in the state of Victoria, Australia, located 90 kilometres (56 mi) north west of Melbourne. It was formerly called "Moorabool" but the name was changed to avoid confusion with a locality near Geelong. The name "Millbrook" was adopted because of a flour mill erected by Matthew Butterly on the West Moorabool creek. At the time of the 2016 census, Millbrook had a population of 156 down from 550 in 2006, partly reflecting changing boundaries. The soil is volcanic and well-adapted to cereals, potatoes and grazing. The landscape is undulating and preserves remnants of the original open forest. The West Moorabool creek runs through the district. The earliest inhabitants of the area were the Wathaurong, and the Irish were prominent among its European settlers in the mid-19th century.

== History ==
Millbrook adjoins or is near to other districts of the Moorabool Shire such as Ballan, Egerton, Gordon, Wallace and Bungaree and its early history is inseparable from theirs.

The Wathaurong people are the original inhabitants. The first European colonists in the region were graziers known as the "Over-Straiters", who had originally come over Bass Strait from Van Diemen's Land (now Tasmania) in the 1830s. They were succeeded by small farmers, many of them Irish, who took advantage of the 1860 Land Act allowing free selection of crown land, including that covered by pastoral leases.

The old road from Melbourne to Ballarat, which passes through Millbrook, was a highway for the miners during the gold rush of the 1850s.

The Moorabool region was rich in native flora and fauna when the European settlers arrived. Casualties of European settlement included kangaroos, dingos, bandicoots, native cats and several bird species. Koalas, possums and various species of parrots remain.

== Station ==
The Millbrook railway station and 34 others were closed on 4 October 1981 because of a new timetable for country passengers in Victoria. A new high-speed service between Melbourne and Ballarat was instituted, with the new line passing through Millbrook and over West Moorabool. This involved the acquisition of land from neighbouring landowners, a cause of some controversy, particularly in view of claims that the lessening of travel time would be minimal. The service started on 22 December 2005.

== Post office ==
The name of the local post office was changed from Moorabool Creek PO to Millbrook PO on 1 August 1879, and the office was closed on 31 July 1985.

== Bibliography ==
Denholm, David. "Squatting" in The Oxford Companion to Australian History, edited by Graeme Davidson. John Hirst & Stuart MacIntyre, Oxford University Press, 1998.

Roberts, Stephen H. History of Australian Land Settlement, 1788–1920. Macmillan / Melbourne University Press, Melbourne, 1924.

Toohey, Jack. On the Eastern Fringe: Recollections and Stories on the Settlement and Farming Histories in the Bungaree, Wallace, Bolwarrah and Gordon Districts. Ballarat 2005.
