= Dunnstown, Victoria =

Dunnstown Victoria
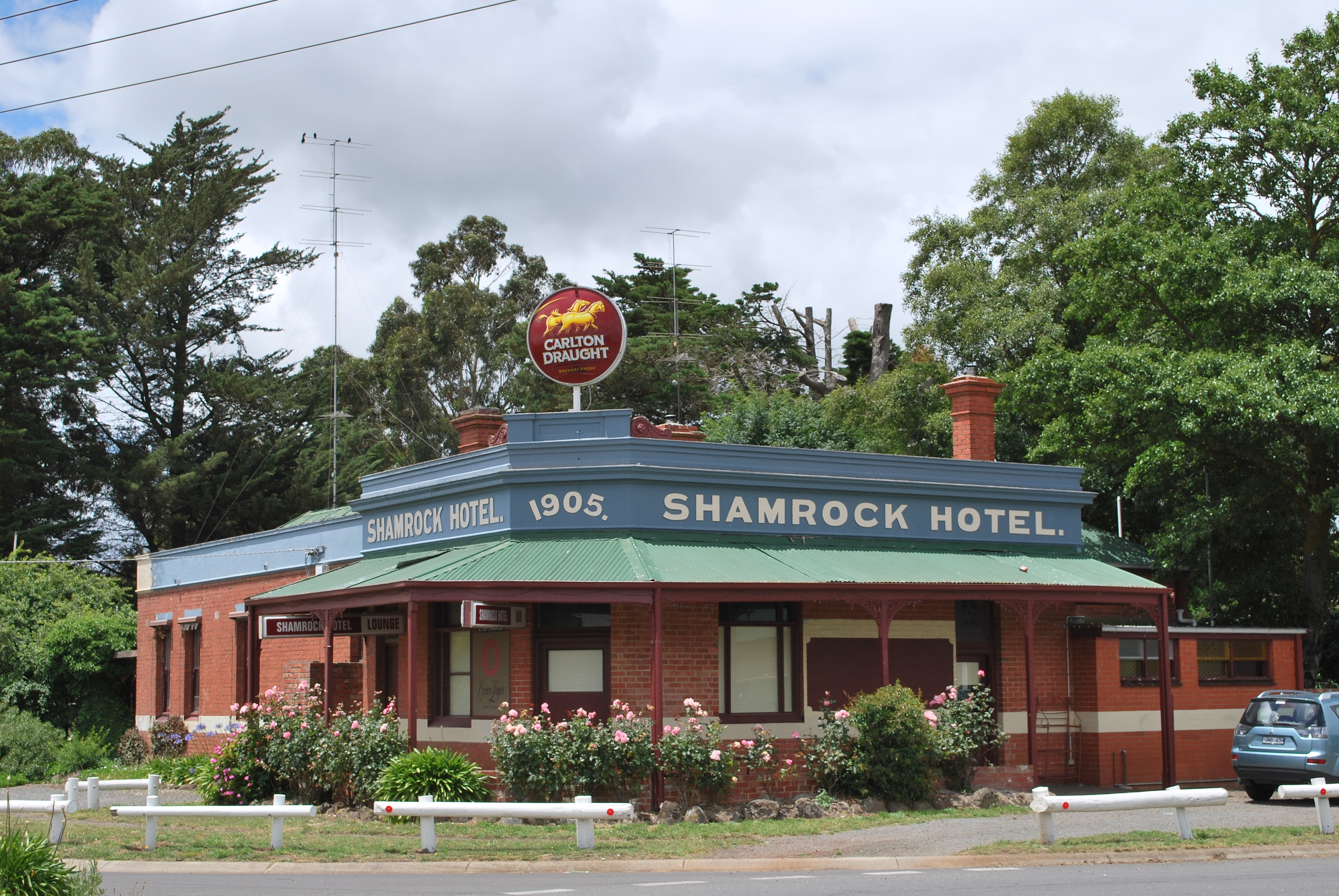
- The Shamrock Hotel

- Coordinates: 37°36′0″S 143°59′0″E
- Population: 259 (2021 census)
- Postcode(s): 3352
- Location: 108 km (67 mi) W of Melbourne; 12 km (7 mi) E of Ballarat
- LGA(s): Shire of Moorabool
- State electorate(s): Eureka
- Federal division(s): Ballarat
Localities around Dunnstown:
Warrenheip	Leigh Creek	Bungaree
Navigators	Dunnstown	Millbrook
Navigators	Yendon	Lal Lal

Dunnstown is a town in Victoria, Australia. The town is located in the Shire of Moorabool, 108 kilometres (67 mi) west of the state capital, Melbourne on the flats below Mount Warrenheip and approximately 12 kilometres (7.5 mi) east of Ballarat. At the 2021 census, Dunnstown and the surrounding area had a population of 259.

== History ==
Dunn's Town Post Office opened on 21 November 1864, was renamed Dunn's Town Railway Station PO in 1884, Dunnstown in 1909 and closed in 1980.

Brind's Distillery, a former whiskey distillery complex on Old Melbourne Road, is listed on the Victorian Heritage Register. It is Victoria's last surviving example of a pot still distillery. In 1893, the distillery employed nearly one third of those working in Victorian distilleries. Parts of the complex have been used more recently for bottling spring water.

== Today ==
The town has an Australian Rules football team competing in the Central Highlands Football League. A tourist attraction, Kryal Castle is located there.
