= Gordon, Victoria =

Gordon Victoria
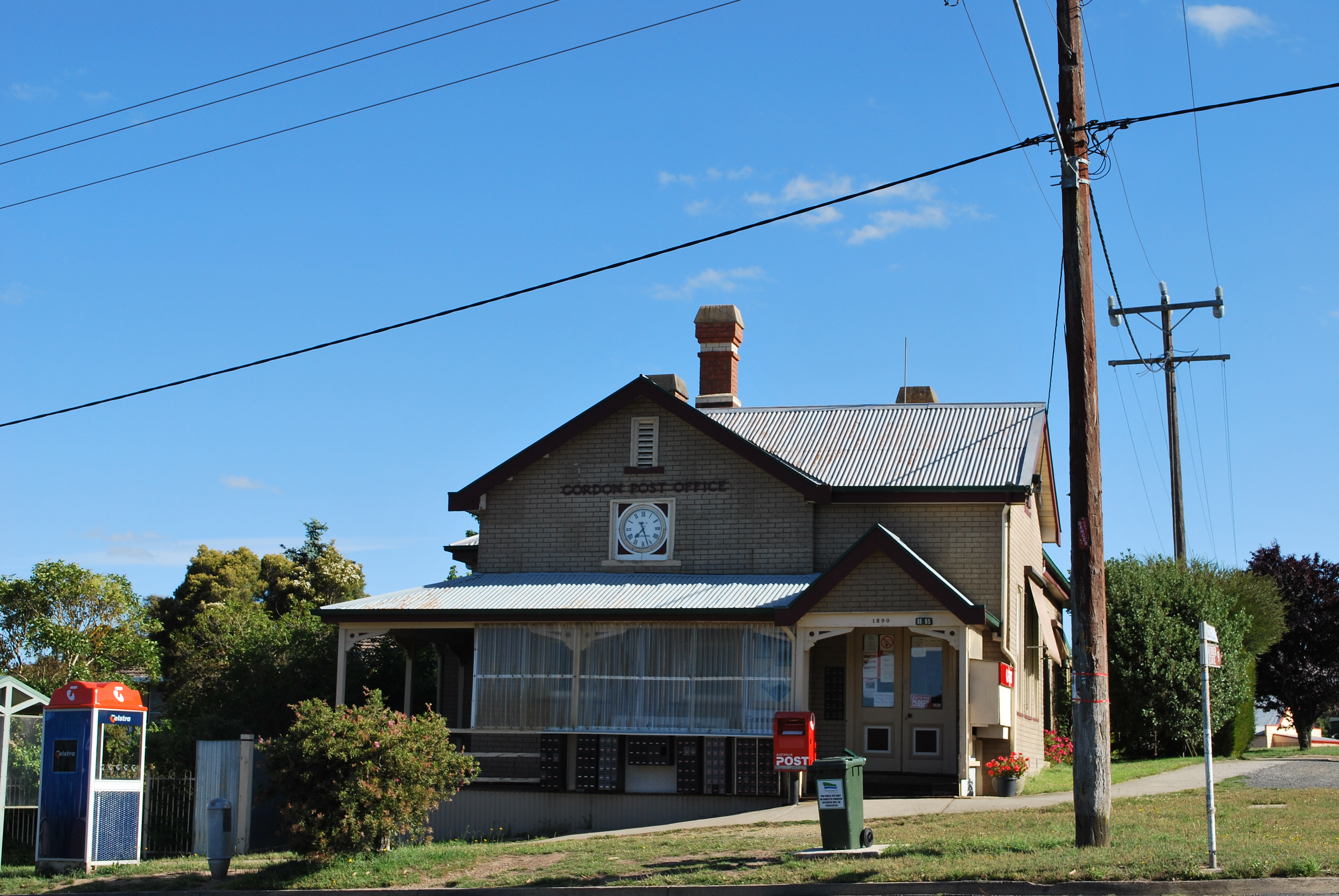
- Gordon Post office

- Coordinates: 37°35′0″S 144°06′0″E
- Population: 1,393 (2021 census)
- Postcode(s): 3345
- Location: 25 km (16 mi) E of Ballarat; 38 km (24 mi) W of Bacchus Marsh; 95 km (59 mi) W of Melbourne
- LGA(s): Shire of Moorabool
- State electorate(s): Eureka
- Federal division(s): Ballarat
Localities around Gordon:
Springbank	Bolwarrah	Bunding
Wallace	Gordon	Ballan
Millbrook	Mount Egerton	Ballan

Gordon is a town in Victoria, Australia, named after settler George Gordon. The town is located on the Old Melbourne Road in the Shire of Moorabool local government area, 95 kilometres (59 mi) west of the state capital, Melbourne. At the 2021 census, Gordon had a population of 1,393.

== History ==
George Gordon settled the area in 1838 with a 30,000 acre stock farming run which was known to outsiders as "Gordons".

During the Victorian gold rush it prospered due to being at the main road junction to the nearby goldfields of All Nation's Gully and Mount Egerton. Gold was discovered in the district in 1853 including around the town itself and several gold mining operations continued extracting in the subsequent decades. The fledgling town had many Irish Australian settlers and those not involved in mining or commerce took up agriculture, notably potato farming.

The local Post Office opened on 1 July 1858 and was known as Gordon's until 1887.

At the peak of its boom, the town had as many as eight hotels, with banks and several stores.

The local railway station on the Melbourne - Ballarat railway opened in 1879 and closed in 1981.

With the cessation of commercial mining in 1910, the town began to decline.

The railway was closed in 1981 and the Western Freeway was built, bypassing the township.

Since the 1990s, Gordon has experienced a revival due to the tree change phenomenon with its large semi-rural blocks, quiet rural aspect and driving proximity to Ballan, Ballarat and the railway to Melbourne. House and Land prices have soared during recent years, leading to Gordon being named in the top five of the Bulletproof suburbs nationwide in a recent study of real estate values.

=== Heritage listed sites ===
Gordon contains a number of heritage listed sites, including:

- Gordon-Egerton Road, Gordon railway station
- Portland Flat Road, Portland Flat Road Bridge

== Geography and township ==
Gordon is situated on the undulating foothills of the Paddock Creek valley. The valley contains a reservoir and public park, and there are a number of walking and jogging paths through this area.

The commercial area is situated along Main Street (Old Melbourne Road) and consists of a single hotel with accommodation, general store, a licensed cafe, pharmacy, gift store, hat shop, post office/store as well as several heritage buildings including St Patrick's Church and others adapted for residential purposes including a bank and an old store. There are also a number of tourist-oriented ventures operating within the township. The township is also serviced by a small government primary school, a small Roman Catholic primary school, a police station, and a community hall.

The town is laid out in grid plan with a network of wide single carriageway streets interrupted only by the topography including the curve of the creek and the peaks of the surrounding hills. This geography also defines the location and provision of sewerage network to the township provided Central Highlands Water in which properties are added to the reticulated service, and those that have septic or treatment plants. The cemetery is located on the eastern edge of township, and contains the relocated remains of the original cemetery that was initially located at the western edge of the town.

Internet connectivity is provided from the shared Gordon-Egerton ADSL2+ enabled Telstra exchange, and wirelessly by the National Broadband Network from either the Springbank and Mount Egerton towers.

The northern and western outskirts of town near the Western Freeway are forested with bush and pine plantations.

== Transport ==
Gordon is an automobile dependent community. The Western Highway passes through Gordon and, though bypassing the centre of town, it provides a connection to the major cities of Melbourne and Ballarat. The Old Western Highway connects the town to the highway via road interchanges directly to the north and via Wallace further to the east. The Old Melbourne Road continues to provide an alternative route to both Ballarat to the west and Ballan to the east. The Gordon-Edgerton Road provides a direct connection to Mount Egerton to the south.

The only public transport is a bus link connecting Gordon to both Ballarat and Ballan, these services only operate once in the morning and once in the evening.

It is approximately a $10AUD taxi fare (5 minutes) to the nearest train station Ballan.

Since the success of the Regional fast rail project, the local community lobbied for the reopening of its station or improved access to Ballan Station. To date, however, their efforts have been unsuccessful. A bus route has since been introduced to counteract this problem with several buses running at intervals throughout the day to local towns including Ballarat and Ballan.

== Culture and sport ==
Australian rules football is the most popular participation and spectator sport. The Gordon Football and Netball Club (known as the Eagles and formed in 1979) plays out of the Gordon Recreational Reserve on Old Melbourne Road at the east of town and compete in the Central Highlands Football League. The football is men's and mixed sex junior teams, with the club's only senior football premiership being in 1988 and has both junior and senior teams; and the netball teams being women's and girls teams. Plans are currently underway to construct a new sporting complex to service the town which will also allow a broader range of sporting and recreation activities.

Spudfest, held annually since 2009, was inspired by the success of a similar festival in Trentham. It is a festival celebrating the town's history and culture with such events as potato peeling competitions, spud and spoon races and spud golf. Fishing is another popular attraction to the town, with many waterways providing ideal breeding locations for trout and other species.
