= Warrenheip =

- Suburb
- Interactive map of Warrenheip
- Coordinates: 37.575°S 143.923°E
- Country: Australia
- State: Victoria
- City: Ballarat
- LGAs: City of Ballarat; Shire of Moorabool
- Location: 5 km (3.1 mi) E of Ballarat; 95 km (59 mi) NW of Melbourne

Government
  - State electorate: Eureka
  - Federal division: Ballarat

Population
  - Total: 721 (2021 census)
- Postcode: 3352
Suburbs around Warrenheip
Brown Hill	Gong Gong	Leigh Creek
Ballarat East	Warrenheip	Leigh Creek
Canadian	Navigators	Dunnstown

Warrenheip /wɒrənˈhiːp/ is a suburb of Ballarat, Victoria, Australia on the eastern rural-urban fringe named after nearby Mount Warrenheip. At the 2021 census, Warrenheip had a population of 721.

== Precolonial history and name origins ==
Mount Warrenheip is situated on the traditional country of the Wathaurong people to whom it holds significant cultural, social and spiritual significance. The name Warrenheip is taken from the Wathaurong word Warrengeep, meaning "emu feathers", believed to relate to the appearance of ferns on the side of the mountain which look like emu feathers.

== Colonial era and the Victorian Gold Rush ==
Gold prospectors from nearby goldfields in Ballarat were present around Warrenheip by the 1860s there was a predominantly Irish farming community by the early 1870s and a primary school was opened in 1876. Warrenheip was established as an electoral division, the Electoral district of Warrenheip in 1889, the electorate was abolished in 1927 when it became the electoral district of Warrenheip and Grenville. A train line from Geelong to Ballarat was built nearby and Warrenheip railway station opened in 1873.

== Warrenheip football club ==
Warrenheip had a football club called warrenheip football club. Its nickname was "The Imperials" Warrenhiep football club spent most of the years of existence in the Dunnstown district football association 1905–1926. It is unknown that it they played any football in 1927–1936. In 1937–1938 they played in the Bungaree football association, then they folded in 1939.

== Modern history ==
As Ballarat expanded eastward during the 1980s, the junction of the Western Highway became a location for light industry. Today industry dominates Warrenheip and continues to expand with the development of business parks. Residential Warrenheip consists mainly of large semi-rural blocks.
