= Mount Boninyong =

Historic Homestead in Victoria, Australia

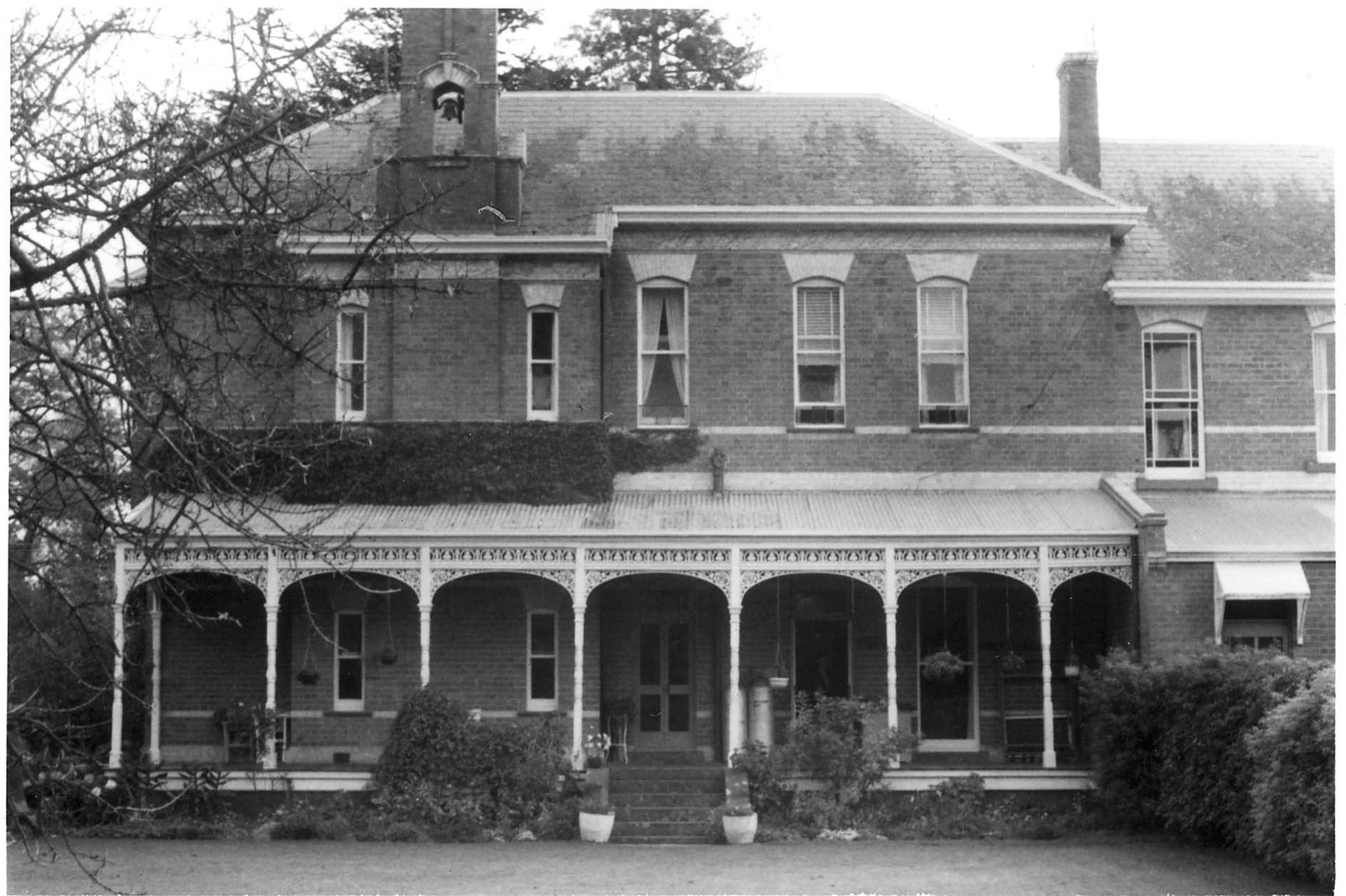
- Mount Boninyong, April 1983

- Location in the Shire of Moorabool, Victoria
- 37°40′18.534″S 143°56′23.1288″E
- Type: Homestead, associated built facilities and grounds
- Location: Scotsburn, Victoria, Australia
- Nearest city: Ballarat

History
- Built: 1884
- Built for: Robert Scott

Site notes
- Architect(s): Joseph Reed, A. M. Henderson and F. J. Smart
- Architectural style: Scottish baronial

Victorian Heritage Register
- Official name: Mount Boninyong Homestead
- Type: State heritage (built and natural)
- Designated: 23 June 1960
- Reference no.: B1101

Mount Boninyong is a historic mansion at the base of Mount Buninyong, of which the homestead was named in the original spelling, located on the Midland Highway in Scotsburn, sitting immediately outside of the City of Ballarat in the Shire of Moorabool, Victoria, Australia. Built in 1884 in a distinctive Scottish Baronial style, the homestead and its surrounding garden form one of the most intact examples of late 19th century pastoral residence complexes in the Ballarat region. The property is notable for its association with early Scottish-Australian pastoral settlement.

== History ==
In 1839, Andrew Scott of Glasgow arrived in the Port Phillip District and took up the Mount Boninyong pastoral run in 1840, establishing one of the earliest grazing operations in the Buninyong region. Scott also took up the Warracknabeal Run from 1845. Mrs. Scott was reportedly the first European woman in the area. His sons, Robert and Andrew Jr., partnered in operating the Mount Boninyong run, and together the family maintained the stations as part of the expanding network of pastoral holdings in the region. Andrew Scott (Sr.) died in 1853. The run initially covered some 16,000 acres of rich grazing land at the foot of Mount Buninyong. The prominence of the Scotts in the settlement of the area was such that the locality eventually became known as Scotsburn.

As pastoral leases were progressively restructured in response to changes in colonial land policy through the 1860s and 1870s, including the opening of selections and subdivision of large runs, portions of the original Boninyong run were sold and reorganised to create smaller farms and settlements. During this period, the Scott family retained core portions of the estate and continued to develop its infrastructure. In 1884, a substantial homestead was constructed for Robert Scott near the site of the original slab hut serving the run. The homestead was built in a prominent Scottish Baronial-influenced Victorian style. The design incorporated complex roof forms, projecting bays and a bellcote, together with cast-iron verandah decoration that was fashionable at the time. The residence was surrounded by a mature garden, which survives as one of the few examples of early domestic landscape plantings in the region.

The garden that accompanies the homestead includes formal lawns and plantings intended to accentuate the scale and aesthetic of the mansion, and it has been identified as one of the oldest intact domestic garden settings in Victoria.
