= Mount Egerton, Victoria =

Mount Egerton
- Town
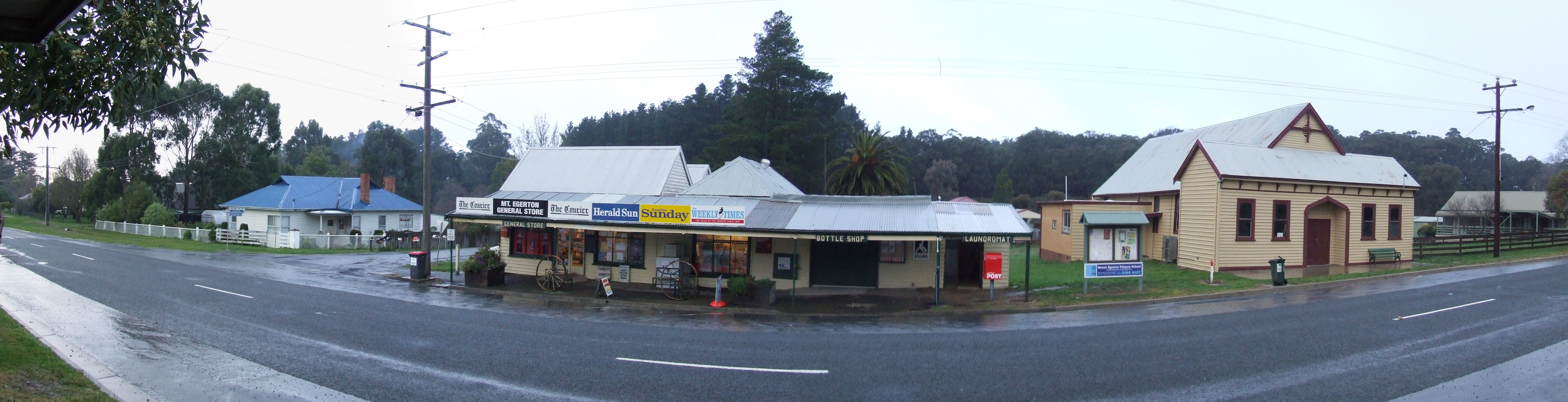
- Mount Egerton General Store

- Coordinates: 37°37′S 144°06′E
- Country: Australia
- State: Victoria
- LGA: Shire of Moorabool
- Location: 97 km (60 mi) NW of Melbourne; 33 km (21 mi) E of Ballarat

Government
  - State electorate: Eureka
  - Federal division: Ballarat

Population
  - Total: 582 (2016 census)
- Postcode: 3352
Localities around Mount Egerton
Millbrook	Gordon	Ballan
Millbrook	Mount Egerton	Ballan
Lal Lal	Bungal	Fiskville

Mount Egerton is a town in Victoria, Australia. It is located on the mountain by the same name in the Shire of Moorabool local government area, 97 kilometres (60 mi) north west of the state capital, Melbourne. At the 2016 census, Mount Egerton had a population of 582.

It was named after settler George Egerton.

The town's main street is Main Road which consists of the historic gold mine and battery, general store (now closed), and hall. The town also contains a primary school and recreational reserve.

== History ==
George Egerton held approximately 35,000 acres of stock farming land in 1838 which to outsiders was known simply as "Egerton's run".

The discovery of gold in 1853 by Alexander Russell and George Grell saw a gold rush in 1854 as placer mining took place along All Nations Gully and West Gully. A rich reef was found at the hill crest in 1856 and an underground mine was established. The Post Office opened on 1 February 1856. The town population swelled to 600, several companies had established mines including the Black Horse and the town was home to banks and several hotels.

The main mine was sold to Thomas and Somerville Learmonth in 1863 and became known as "Learmonth's Claim".

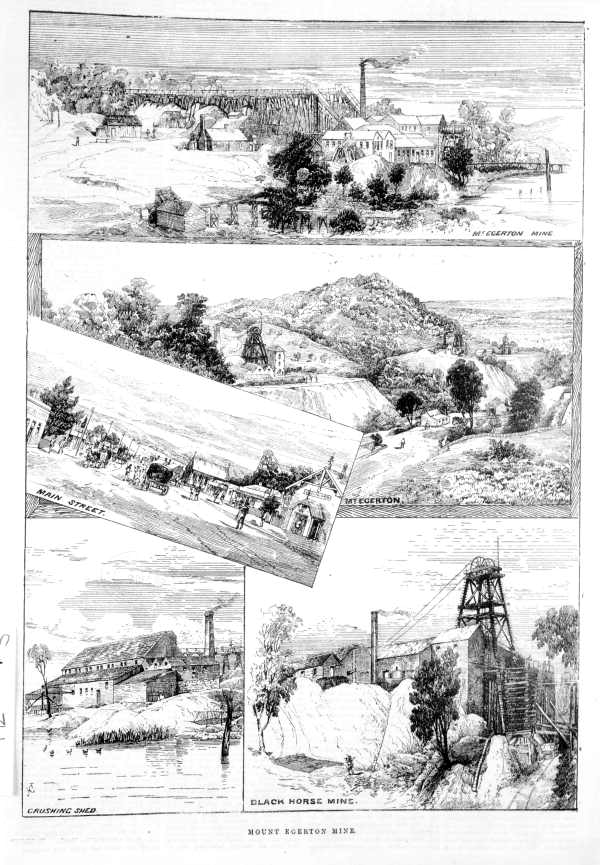
Lithograph of the town and mines in 1892

St Francis Xavier was built in 1868 by settler Thomas Thyne. Mt Egerton Primary School began taking enrolments on 6 November 1877.

Although sustained mining occurred through the 19th Century, a decline in gold output caused a general decline in the town and it gradually decreased in size while many of the district's buildings and homes were abandoned until mining operations finally ceased in 1910 having produced a total gold output valued at around 2 million pounds.

The post office closed in 1993. In 1996 the general store was redeveloped into a fish and chip shop, liquor store and laundromat, with the old bank being removed to make way. The shop closed in May 2010, and the premises was used as a private residence. In 2023 the shop was reopened under new ownership, trading as 'Half Pace General Store'

In 2011, proposals were submitted for a wind farm and telecommunications towers both of which have met some community opposition. WestWind Energy has proposed the Moorabool Wind Farm, a 330MW, 107 turbine facility in the vicinity of the town.

== Geography and climate ==
Mount Egerton is situated in gently sloping but highly elevated hills ranging from 518 m (highlight point) to 634 m (highlight point) above sea level. This results in a cold and windy climate and it is not unusual for snow to fall on the town during the winter months.

The town is surrounded by bushland and is situated close to a State Forest to the east, presenting a high bushfire risk in the summer months.

== Transport ==
Mount Egerton is an automobile dependent community. The town is situated at the junction of three main roads. The Gordon-Egerton Road provides a direct connection to Gordon to the north and ongoing connections to Ballarat and Melbourne while the Ballan-Egerton Road provides a direct connection to Ballan to the east and the Yendon-Egerton Road provides a link west to Yendon, beyond to Ballarat and smaller towns to the south.

The town has 2 public transport bus links with one connecting to both Ballarat and Gordon operating Monday to Friday and Saturday once a day in the morning to Ballarat and returning in the afternoon.

The other bus service is the connecting service to the Ballan train station to meet with the morning express train to Melbourne. This operates Monday to Friday only.

The high school students and private school students have dedicated bus services provided by the Govt on all school days.

Since the success of the Regional fast rail project, the local community lobbied for the reopening of nearby Gordon station or improved access to Ballan Station, however to date have been unsuccessful.

== Culture and sport ==
The Mount Egerton Recreation Reserve is the hub of sporting activity in the town, although the town's small population makes organised sports a challenge. Australian rules football is popular, however the local club is dormant and the oval has instead been used for other sports mostly by teams from nearby towns. Cricket is also popular. A local cricket association existed until 1951 after which the local team joined the Ballarat Cricket Association. The club has since disbanded and the Gordon Cricket Club instead makes use of its venue. Tennis was also popular, however the local club dissolved. Soccer has a presence in the town with a local team existing for a short time before disbanding. Instead The Ballan United Soccer Club and the Moorabool Panthers Soccer Club use the reserve as a venue.

== Notable people ==
- Captain Moonlite - notorious bushranger lived in the town and known for robbing the local bank
- Ernest Wetherell - minister in the New South Wales Legislative Assembly
