= Clarkes Hill, Victoria =

Clarkes Hill Victoria
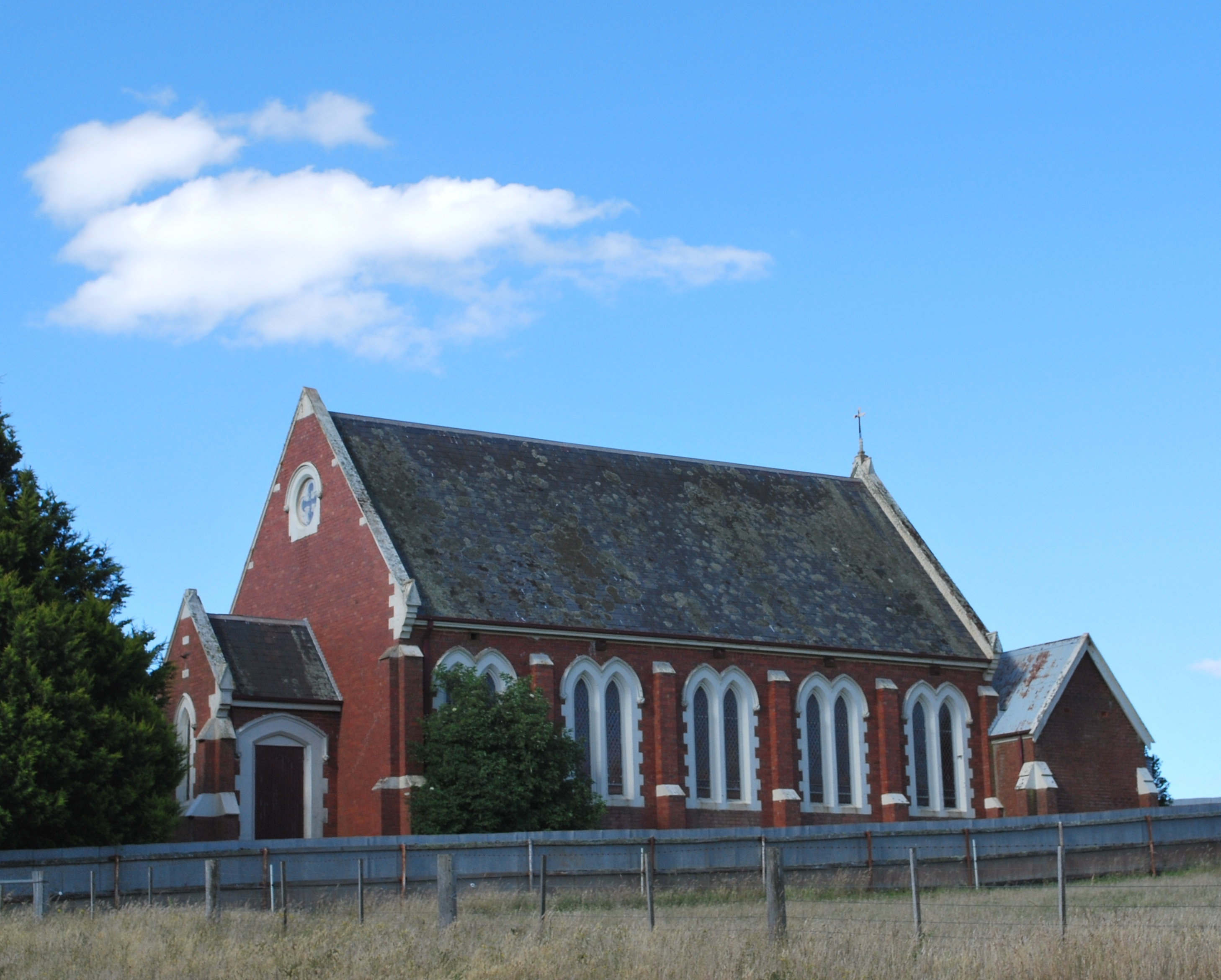
- St Peter's Roman Catholic church at Clarkes Hill

- Coordinates: 37°29′03″S 143°58′33″E
- Population: 75 (2021 census)
- Postcode(s): 3352
- Location: 112 km (70 mi) WNW of Melbourne; 18 km (11 mi) NE of Ballarat; 11 km (7 mi) SE of Creswick
- LGA(s): Shire of Moorabool
- State electorate(s): Eureka
- Federal division(s): Ballarat

Clarkes Hill is a locality in central Victoria, Australia. The locality is in the Shire of Moorabool, 112 kilometres (70 mi) west of the state capital, Melbourne and 18 kilometres (11 mi) north east of the regional city of Ballarat.

At the 2021 census, Clarkes Hill had a population of 75.
