= Barkstead, Victoria =

Barkstead
- Town
- Coordinates: 37.472934°S 144.101289°E
- Country: Australia
- State: Victoria
- LGA: Shire of Moorabool

Government
  - State electorate: Eureka
  - Federal division: Ballarat

Population
  - Total: 41 (2021 census)
- Postcode: 3352

Barkstead is a locality in Shire of Moorabool, Victoria, Australia. At the 2021 census, Barkstead had a population of 41.
