= Bullarook =

Bullarook Victoria
- Coordinates: 37.5435°S 143.981°E
- Population: 99 (2016 census)
- Postcode(s): 3352
- Elevation: 563 m (1,847 ft)
- Location: 105 km (65 mi) SE of Melbourne; 17 km (11 mi) SE of Creswick; 14 km (9 mi) W of Ballarat
- LGA(s): Shire of Moorabool
- State electorate(s): Buninyong
- Federal division(s): Ballarat
Mean max temp	Mean min temp	Annual rainfall
18.1 °C; 65 °F	7.4 °C; 45 °F	?

Bullarook is a locality in the Central Highlands in Victoria, near Ballarat.

Bullarook was home to the William Tell Quartz Mining Co., a gold mining company which was active until 1865.

The town had a cricket club which operated during the 1920s. The town had a State school, which operated from the 1860s to at least until the end of the First World War. Bullarook was also serviced by the Sawyers' Arms and the Fellmongers' Arms Hotels. The town has an Avenue of Honour, which was planted in August 1920.

== Notable residents ==
Denis Murphy - Hanged at Ballarat for a murder at Bullarook on 16 April 1867
