= Ballan, Victoria =

Ballan
- Town
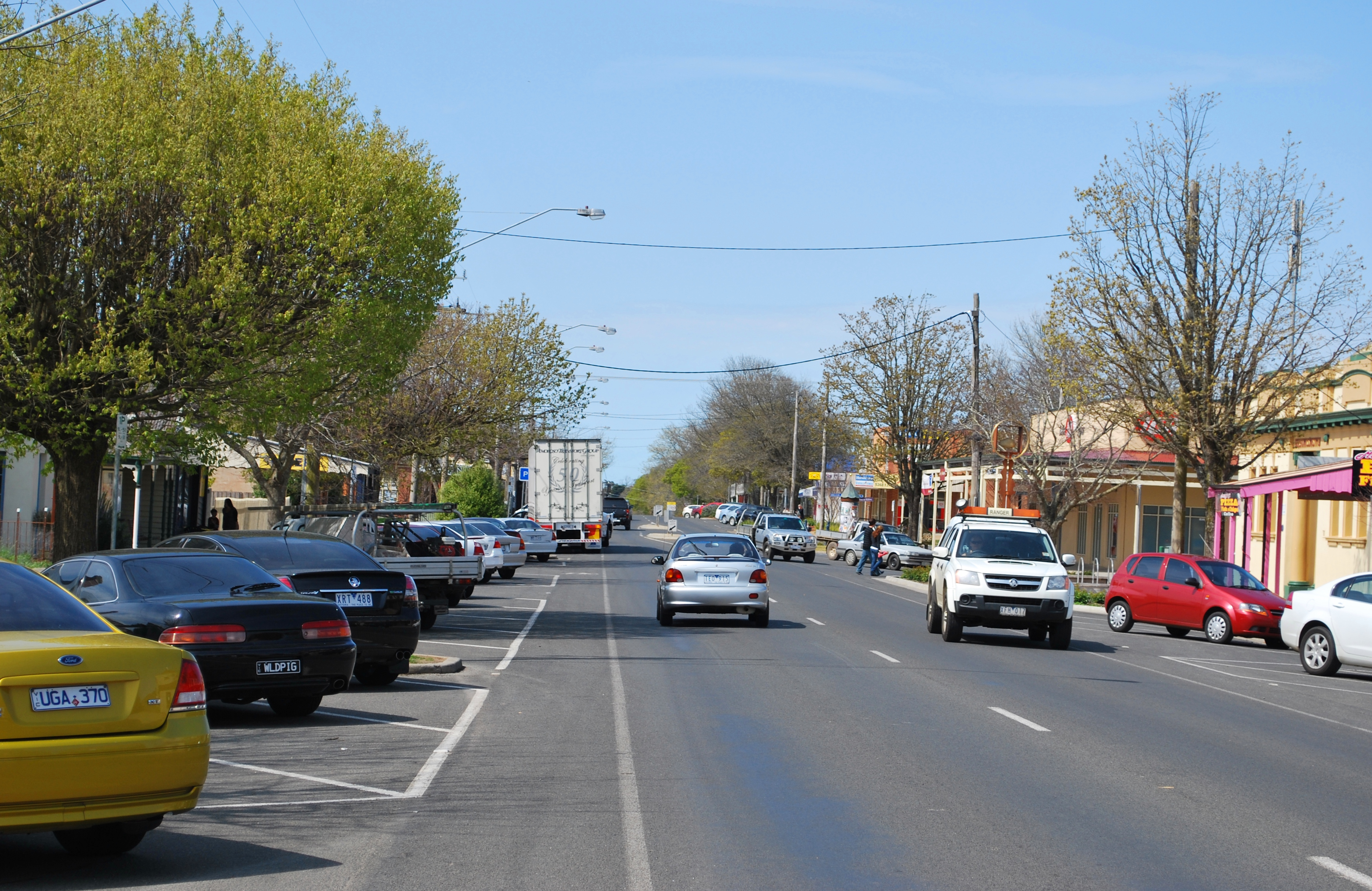
- Inglis Street, the main street

- Interactive map of Ballan
- Coordinates: 37°36′S 144°15′E
- Country: Australia
- State: Victoria
- LGA: Shire of Moorabool
- Location: 39 km (24 mi) SE of Ballarat; 80 km (50 mi) NW of Melbourne; 37 km (23 mi) S of Daylesford; 71 km (44 mi) N of Geelong; 24 km (15 mi) NW of Bacchus Marsh

Government
  - State electorate: Eureka
  - Federal division: Hawke
- Elevation: 442 m (1,450 ft)

Population
  - Total: 3,392 (2021 census)
- Postcode: 3342
- Mean max temp: 17.1 °C (62.8 °F)
- Mean min temp: 6.3 °C (43.3 °F)
- Annual rainfall: 571.2 mm (22.49 in)
Localities around Ballan
Bunding	Colbrook	Dales Creek; Greendale
Gordon	Ballan	Myrniong
Mount Egerton; Bungal	Fiskville	Bacchus Marsh

Ballan (/bəˈlæn/) is a town in Victoria, Australia. At the 2021 census, Ballan had a population of 3,392.

It is the second largest administrative centre, behind Bacchus Marsh, in the Shire of Moorabool local government area. Ballan is a small country regional town but also not too far from Melbourne City which takes a one-hour drive. Ballan Town is located in between Melbourne - Ballarat Western Freeway and had a major train stop in between these two cities. Ballan's facilities include a hospital, primary schools, railway station, police station, post office, church, banks, ATM, public play grounds, golf club, hotel, pub, caravan park, fuel station, restaurants, supermarket and other shops. During the Victorian Gold Rush, it became an important staging point for coaches travelling to the Ballarat goldfields.

== History ==
The Wadawurrung and Wurundjeri peoples of the Kulin Nations are the traditional owners of the land that is today's Ballan.

In April 1838, Robert William von Stieglitz (1816–1876) took up a pastoral run situated on the Werribee River's right riverbank. He named it Ballan. His brother John Lewis von Stieglitz (1809–1868) occupied the adjoining run, Ballanee. The two von Stieglitz brothers were some of the first European settlers in the Port Phillip District.

The township of Ballan was surveyed in 1850 and named after von Stieglitz's run.

Gold was found in the area in 1851, which brought an influx of prospectors during the Victorian Gold Rush. The Ballan Hotel dates from the gold rush period in 1851. The town became an important staging point for coaches travelling to the Ballarat Goldfields. The post office in the township opened around September 1853, although two earlier offices in the area were named Ballan.

Ballan Primary School was established on 8 January 1855.

The first Mechanics' Institute in Ballan was built in 1861, with the current Mechanics' Institute built on land purchased in 1881, although the façade was demolished and rebuilt in 1922. The building houses the library for the town and a hall.

St Paul's Presbyterian Church in Ballan was officially opened in July 1866.

On 15 November 2003, a Sprinter train travelling to Ballarat was derailed between Ballan and Gordon, injuring 61 people when it hit a stationary vehicle on a country railway crossing.

== Climate ==
Ballan has an oceanic climate (Köppen: Cfb), with very mild, relatively dry summers and cool, slightly wetter winters. Influenced by its elevation (442 m (1,450 ft)); average maxima vary from 24.6 °C (76.3 °F) in January to 10.2 °C (50.4 °F) in July, while average minima fluctuate between 10.3 °C (50.5 °F) in February and 2.8 °C (37.0 °F) in July. Mean average annual precipitation is moderately low, 571.2 mm (22.49 in), and is spread between 138.5 precipitation days. Despite this, the town is not very sunny, with 165.2 cloudy days and only 58.0 clear days per annum. Extreme temperatures have ranged from 43.2 °C (109.8 °F) on 31 January 1968 to −5.8 °C (21.6 °F) on 16 August 1967.

Climate data for Ballan (37º36'00"S, 144º12'00"E, 442 m AMSL) (1927-1969 normals & extremes)
Month	Jan	Feb	Mar	Apr	May	Jun	Jul	Aug	Sep	Oct	Nov	Dec	Year
Record high °C (°F)	43.2 (109.8)	41.4 (106.5)	36.9 (98.4)	30.9 (87.6)	25.2 (77.4)	21.4 (70.5)	16.7 (62.1)	20.0 (68.0)	27.6 (81.7)	31.7 (89.1)	34.7 (94.5)	37.8 (100.0)	43.2 (109.8)
Mean daily maximum °C (°F)	24.6 (76.3)	23.9 (75.0)	21.8 (71.2)	17.3 (63.1)	13.7 (56.7)	11.0 (51.8)	10.2 (50.4)	11.5 (52.7)	13.9 (57.0)	16.4 (61.5)	19.0 (66.2)	21.9 (71.4)	17.1 (62.8)
Mean daily minimum °C (°F)	9.5 (49.1)	10.3 (50.5)	9.2 (48.6)	6.9 (44.4)	5.1 (41.2)	3.5 (38.3)	2.8 (37.0)	3.3 (37.9)	4.3 (39.7)	5.6 (42.1)	6.8 (44.2)	8.4 (47.1)	6.3 (43.3)
Record low °C (°F)	−0.6 (30.9)	0.1 (32.2)	−1.7 (28.9)	−1.8 (28.8)	−3.6 (25.5)	−4.7 (23.5)	−4.7 (23.5)	−5.8 (21.6)	−3.3 (26.1)	−3.1 (26.4)	−1.1 (30.0)	0.6 (33.1)	−5.8 (21.6)
Average precipitation mm (inches)	34.9 (1.37)	48.7 (1.92)	34.0 (1.34)	55.5 (2.19)	47.5 (1.87)	45.0 (1.77)	47.3 (1.86)	55.6 (2.19)	51.5 (2.03)	58.0 (2.28)	47.5 (1.87)	45.9 (1.81)	571.2 (22.49)
Average precipitation days (≥ 0.2 mm)	6.2	6.6	7.8	11.5	13.3	14.2	15.4	15.7	13.7	13.6	10.8	9.5	138.3
Average afternoon relative humidity (%)	48	52	58	64	73	76	76	72	69	65	61	55	64
Source: Bureau of Meteorology (1927-1969 normals & extremes)

== Health service ==
- Ballan District Health & Care: Located at 33 Cowie Street, Ballan Hospital is a community-owned, registered charity, with 170+ staff members and 70+ volunteers, providing healthcare and wellbeing services for Ballan and surrounding districts. There is an ongoing demand for allowing a Maternity Ward in Ballan Hospital for years.
- Private Medical Centre's also functioning in town with GP Consultation

== Education ==
There are two primary schools in Ballan: Ballan Primary School and St Brigid's Catholic Primary School. There is a child care centre also functioning in town. For high school, students go to Bacchus Marsh, Ballarat or Daylesford. There are bus services for students to these towns. There is an ongoing demand for allowing a high school in Ballan for years.

== Transport ==
The Western Freeway bypasses the town, but is located nearby and connects Ballan to Melbourne in the east and Ballarat to the west. The main road into town, the Old Melbourne Road (Old Inglis Street), is also the main street. Other main roads are the Geelong - Ballan Road and Daylesford - Ballan Road.

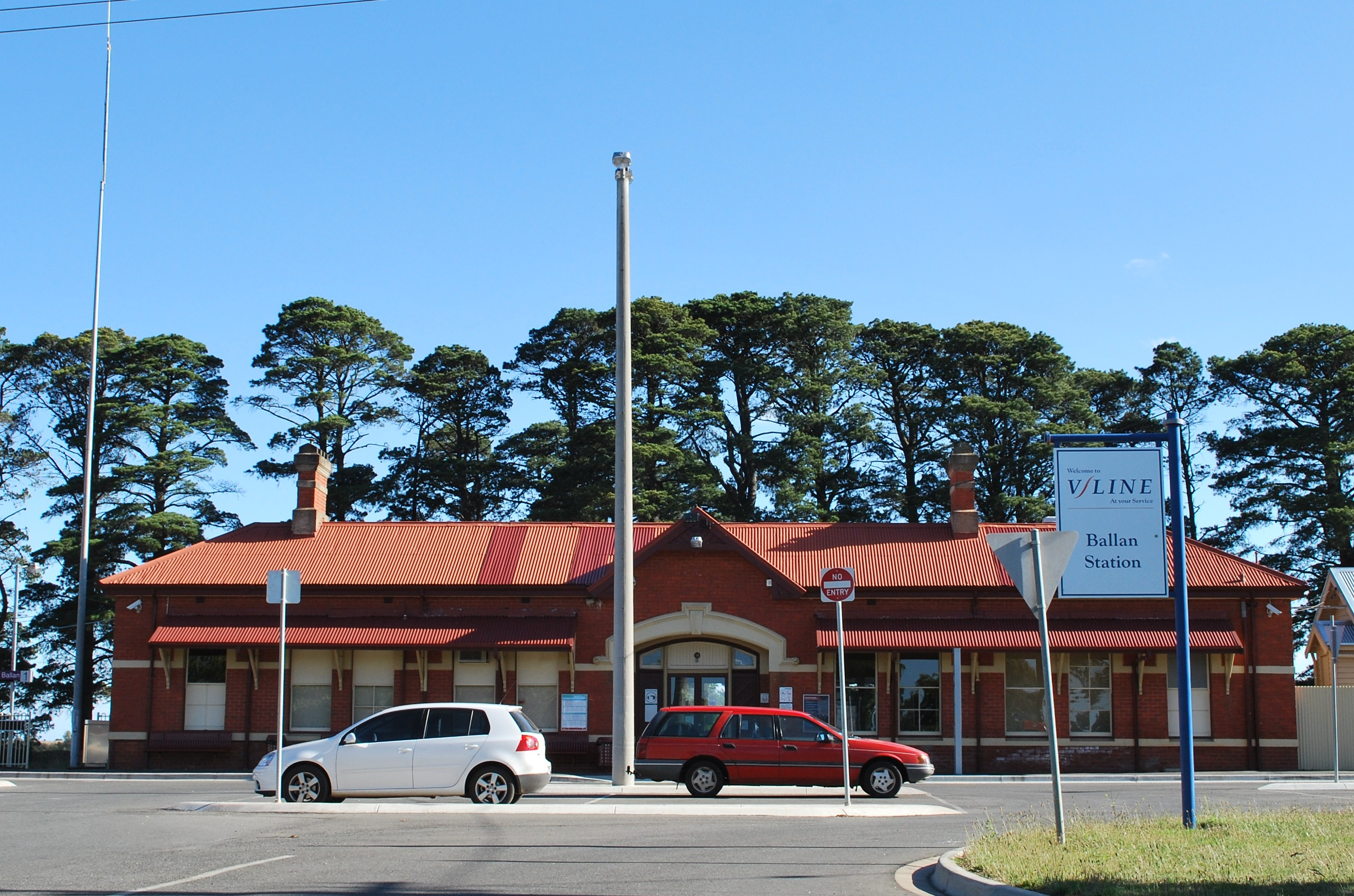
Ballan railway station

The Ballarat V/Line rail service serves Ballan railway station approximately every hour with a 1-hour journey time to the state's regional railway hub Southern Cross station in Melbourne, or a 20-minute journey to Ballarat. Located on the Serviceton line, trains stopping at the station give Ballan access via Ballarat to regional services including the Ararat V/Line rail service, the Mildura line as far as Maryborough and connecting bus services. The town centre is only a three-block walk from the station. Trains to Ballarat and Melbourne run at a frequency of 20 minutes during peak hour and 40 minutes in at other times, starting from 4 AM to 11 PM.

VLine coaches also regularly stop in Ballan en route from Ballarat to Melbourne, and Ballarat Airport shuttle buses run from the Ballan Police Station Bus Stop to Melbourne Airport. Ballan Bus Lines also runs on all weekdays bus services to Daylesford (Hepburn Springs) and Gordon (Mount Egerton).

The nearest major airports are Melbourne Airport and Avalon Airport. There is also a local taxi service based in Ballan.

== Sport ==
The town has an Australian rules football team competing in the Central Highlands Football League.

Ballan Brumbies Basketball Club was founded in 2017, playing in the Ballarat Basketball Association competitions. As of July 2023, the club fielded four men's & ladies' senior teams, as well as 20 junior teams. The club's colours are white, royal blue & gold.

The Ballan Cricket Club currently has 2 Senior and 3 Junior teams competing in the Ballarat Cricket Association. The seniors in BCA 2nd grade & One day C grade whilst the Juniors are U12 in the MJCA, U13 & U16 with the BCA. The club has been back with the BCA since the 2005/06 season after 14 years in the Daylesford & District Cricket Association.

The Ballan Bowling Club currently fields three pennant teams in the Ballarat District Bowls Division.

Golfers play at the Ballan Golf Club on Blow Court.

Ballan Football Club is currently involved in the Central Highlands football netball league. They offer a chance for both junior footballers and netballers to play, as well as 2 senior football and 3 senior netball teams.

== Festivals and attractions ==
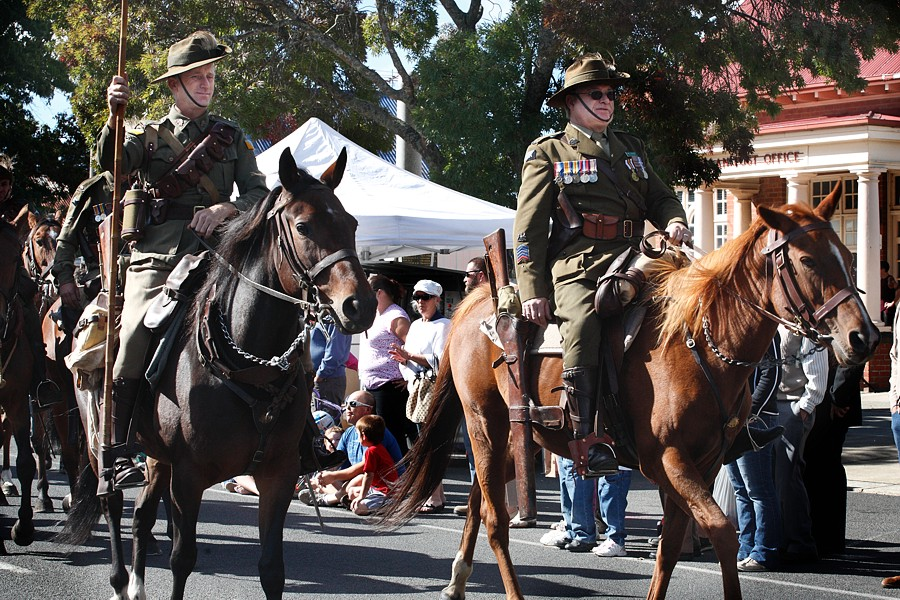
Ballan Autumn Festival Light Horse re-enactors

- A Vintage Machinery and Vehicle Rally is held in February, well known for its vintage tractor pull.
- An Autumn Festival is held in Ballan every year in late March.
- BuzzConf, a technology and futurist festival, is held in Ballan every November.
- Although there is a mineral spring at Ballan, it does not have the high profile of the towns of Hepburn Springs and Daylesford further to the north.
- To the south of Ballan are the Brisbane Ranges National Park and the You Yangs Forest Park.

== Community groups ==
- In 1937, a Country Women's Association (CWA) branch was established in Ballan.
- In the former courthouse, which closed down in 1983, the Ballan Shire Historical Society holds meetings every month except December.
- The Ballan Golf Club manages a "shady, tree-lined [and] generally flat" golf course situated on the banks of the Werribee River.

== See also ==
- Ballan railway station, Victoria
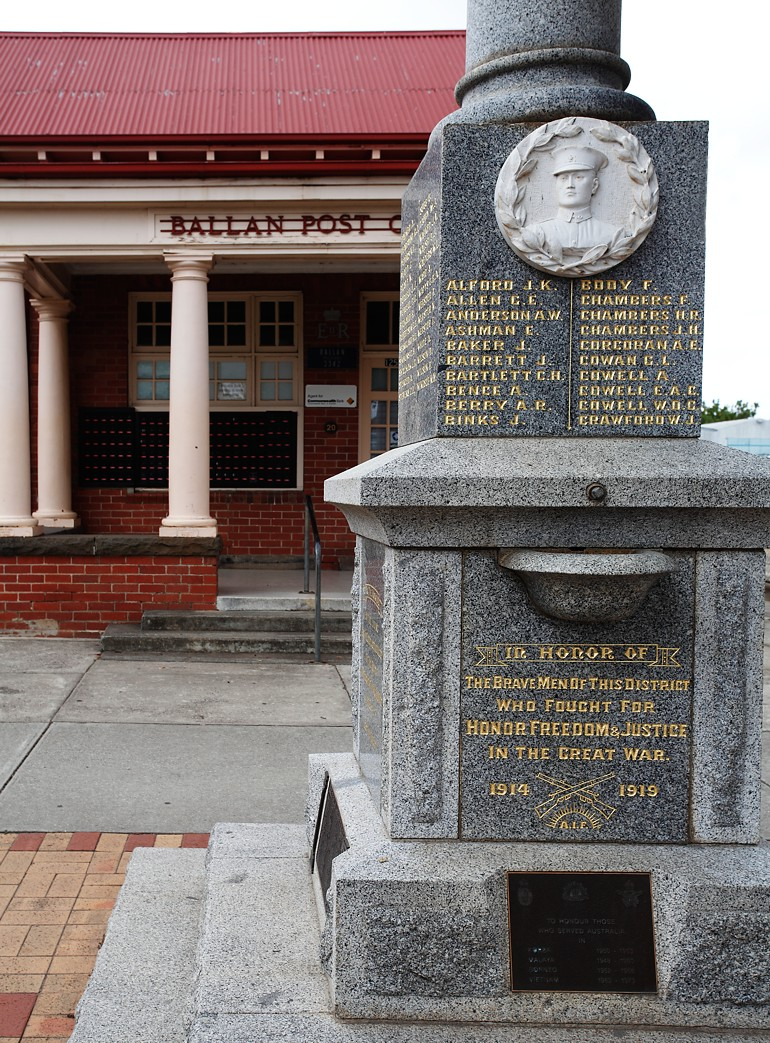
Ballan Post Office and War Memorial

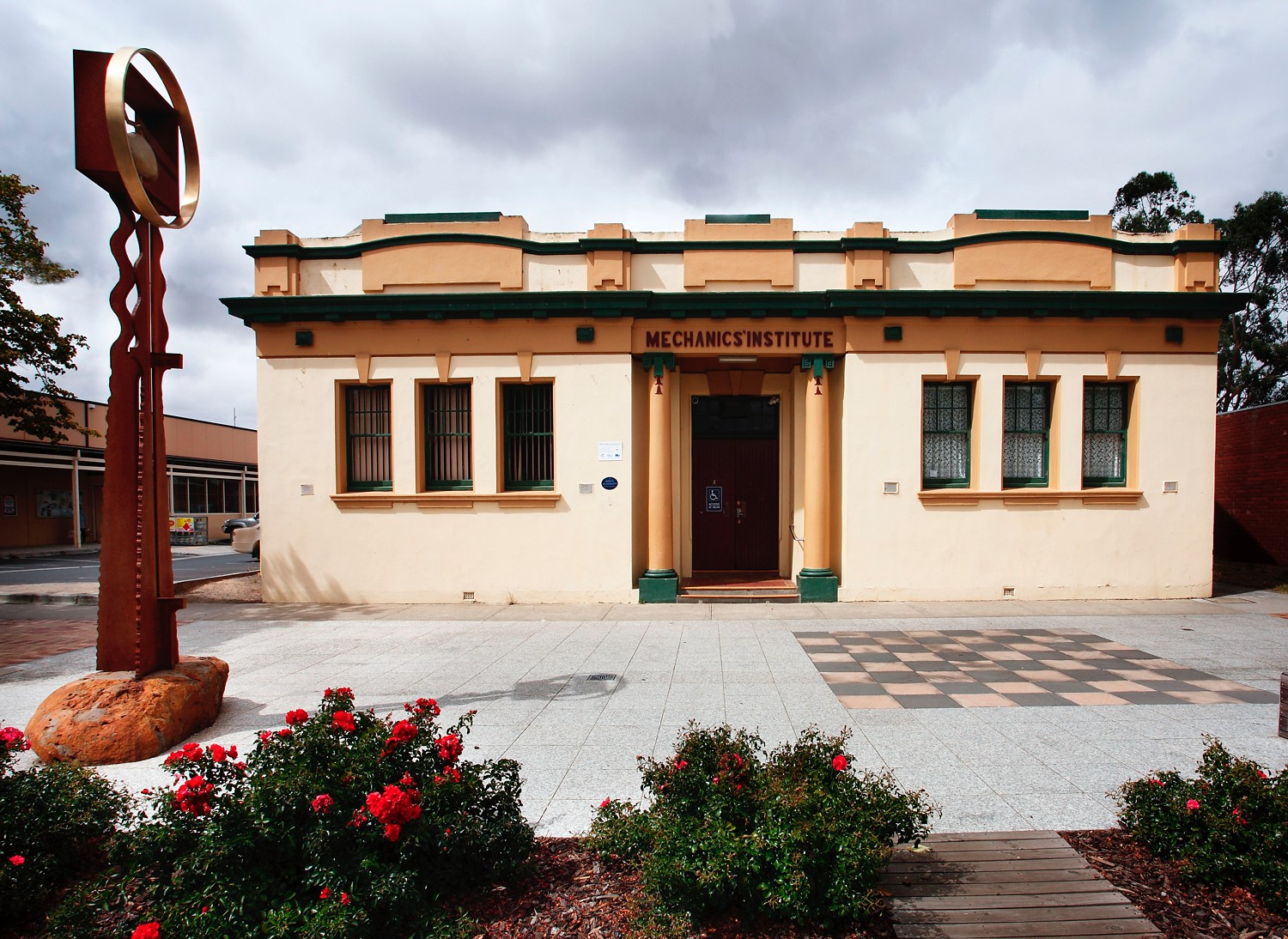
Ballan Mechanics' Institute

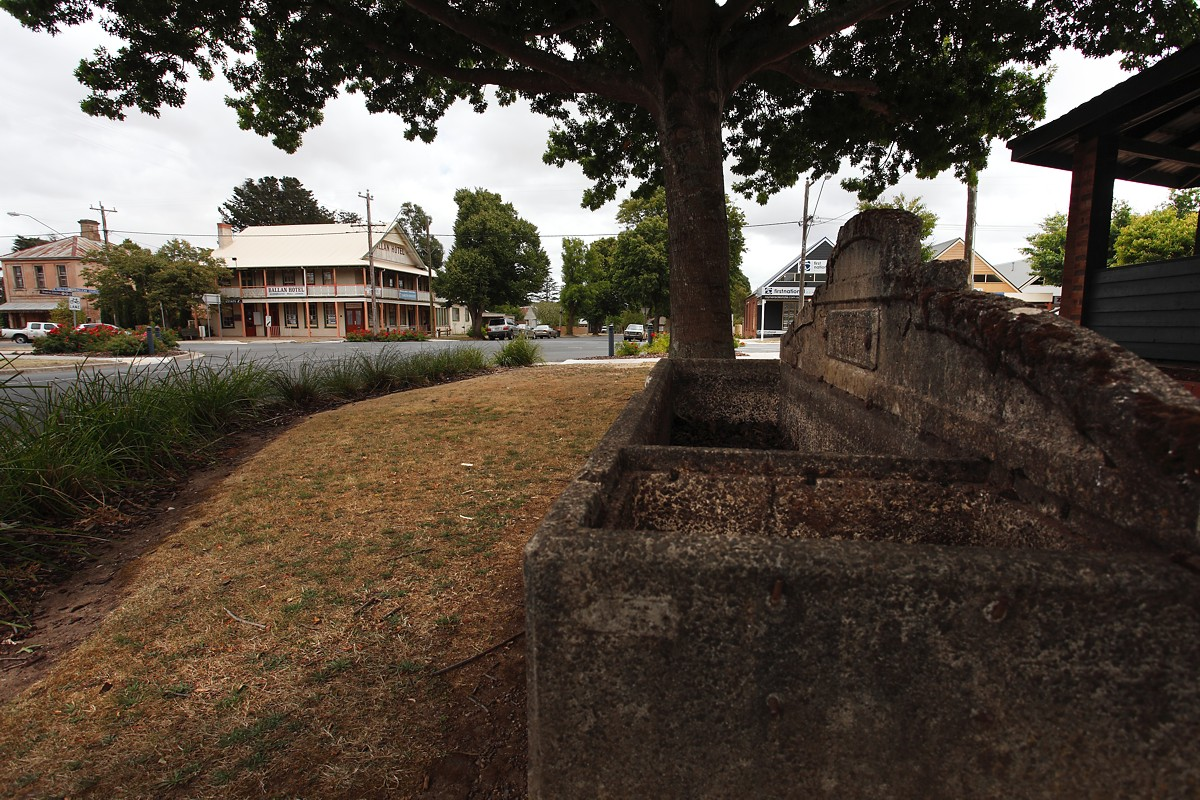
Horse trough on the corner of Fisken and Inglis Streets

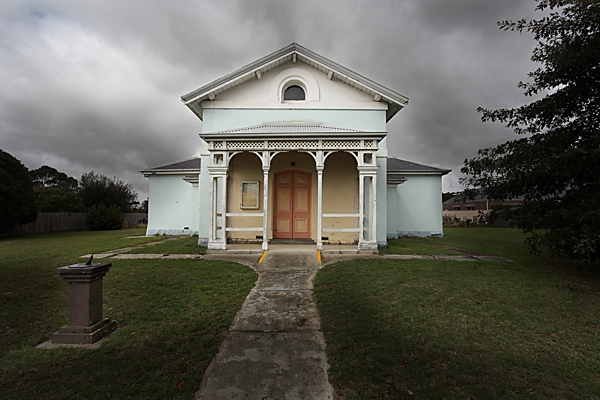
Old Ballan Court House; now used as meeting place for Ballan Historical Society

== Bibliography ==
- Clark, Ian D.; Hercus, Luise; Kostanski, Laura, eds. (2014). Indigenous and Minority Placenames: Australian and International Perspectives (PDF). ANU Press. ISBN 9781925021622.
