= Bolwarrah, Victoria =

Bolwarrah
- Suburb
- Coordinates: 37.509011°S 144.111319°E
- Country: Australia
- State: Victoria
- LGA: Shire of Moorabool

Government
  - State electorate: Buninyong
  - Federal division: Ballarat

Population
  - Total: 48 (2021 census)

Bolwarrah is a rural locality in the Shire of Moorabool, Victoria, Australia. At the 2021 census, Bolwarrah had a population of 48.
