= Wallace, Victoria =

Wallace
- Town
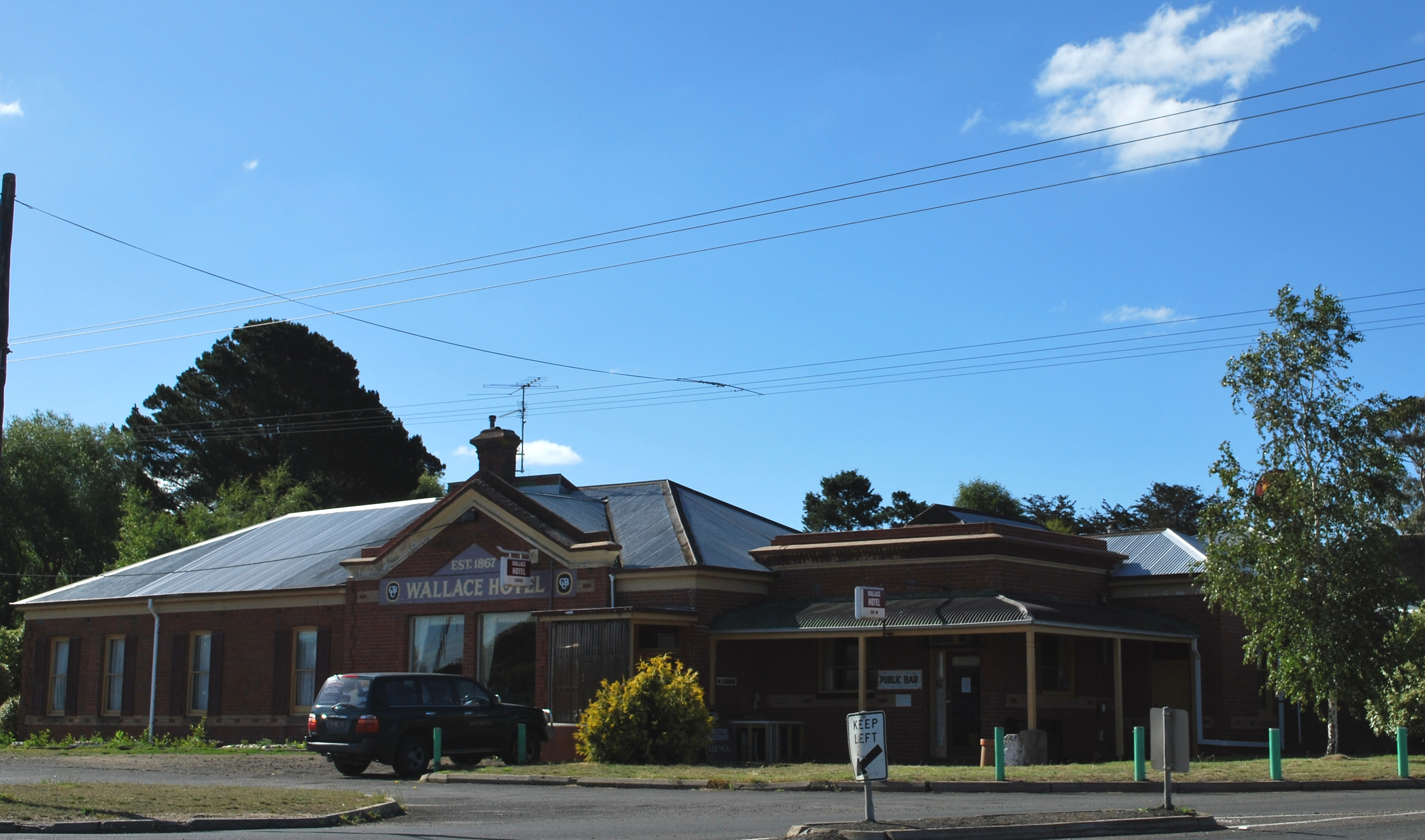
- Wallace Hotel

- Coordinates: 37°33′0″S 144°03′0″E
- Country: Australia
- State: Victoria
- LGA: Shire of Moorabool
- Location: 99 km (62 mi) NW of Melbourne; 19 km (12 mi) E of Ballarat; 18 km (11 mi) W of Ballan

Government
  - State electorate: Eureka
  - Federal division: Ballarat

Population
  - Total: 227 (2021 census)
- Postcode: 3352
Localities around Wallace
Bungaree	Springbank	Gordon
Bungaree	Wallace	Gordon
Bungaree	Millbrook	Gordon

Wallace is a town in Victoria, Australia in the Shire of Moorabool local government area, 99 kilometres (62 mi) north-west of the state capital, Melbourne.

The township was established in the 1880s. Wallace Post Office opened on 2 October 1885 and closed on 26 February 1993.

Wallace was the birthplace of Edmond Hogan, twice Victorian Premier in the 1920s.
