= Kryal Castle =

Replica medieval castle in Australia

Coordinates: 37°34′19″S 143°57′23″E

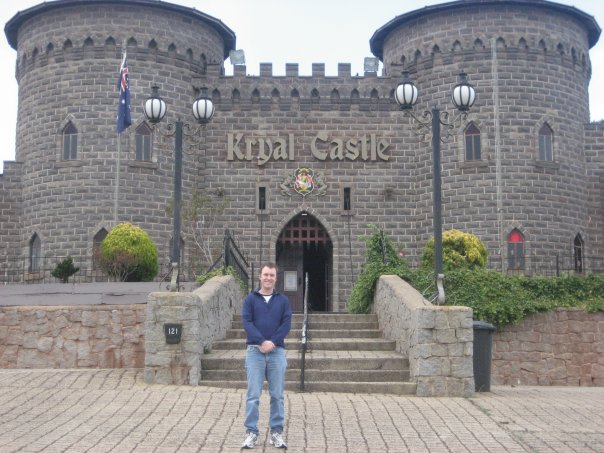
Kryal Castle in 2009.

Kryal Castle is a replica medieval castle located eight kilometres east of Ballarat, Australia, at Leigh Creek, just north of Dunnstown, in the foothills of Mount Warrenheip.

The castle features a moat and drawbridge, a maze, castle towers, stocks, and an armoury. There are also shows involving jousting, live theatre, a jester, juggler and fire eating, as well as a "Wax Of Torture" museum. The castle also provides accommodation and hosts weddings and conferences.

== History ==
The castle's name derives from the first initial and surname of its builder, Keith Ryall, who had made his fortune selling body armour. Ryall, born in 1942, had left school at 16 and had also been a refrigerator salesman in Creswick. He received a loan of $75 000 from the Victorian Development Corporation to realise the project. Construction began in 1972, and the attraction was opened to the public in 1974.

In 2007 the property was listed for sale with an asking price of $10 million, but failed to find a buyer. There was interest from some parties in turning it into a medieval-style brothel. After having been on the market for several years, it was sold in January 2011 to Jay Finch and Wendy Alexander, who intended to continue it as a hotel and theme park. However, in August 2011 ownership of the property was returned to Keith Ryall after the Finch family was unable to complete payment for it.

In January 2012, Kryal Castle was acquired by Castle Tourism & Entertainment Pty Ltd. It closed for a major renovation and upgrade, reopening in 2013, having been developed into a multi-use venue, offering daytime and night-time tourism, and entertainment experiences. There are Castle Suites with four-star accommodation, as well as function, wedding and conferencing facilities. Medieval adventure, fantasy and theme park concepts have been developed. The medieval sport of jousting has been reintroduced along with sound and light attractions.

In 2015, Keith Ryall, the original owner of the castle died. His funeral was held at Kryal. Castle Tourism & Entertainment placed Kryal Castle on the market in 2016 and it was ultimately purchased by the then-current leaseholders. In 2022, it was nominated for Best Victorian Tourism Attraction.
