= Navigators, Victoria =

Locality in Victoria, Australia

Navigators
- Town
- Coordinates: 37°36′36″S 143°55′55″E
- Country: Australia
- State: Victoria
- LGA: Shire of Moorabool

Government
  - State electorate: Buninyong
  - Federal division: Ballarat

Population
  - Total: 276 (2021 census)
- Postcode: 3352
Localities around Navigators
Mount Helen	Warrenheip	Dunnstown
Buninyong	Navigators	Dunnstown
	Yendon	Yendon

Navigators is a locality in the Shire of Moorabool, Victoria, Australia, situated approximately 10 kilometres south-east of Ballarat. The locality lies between Mount Buninyong and Mount Warrenheip and is located on the Ballarat–Geelong railway corridor. At the 2021 census, Navigators had a population of 276.

== History ==
Navigators developed during the Victorian gold rush of the 1850s. Gold discoveries throughout the Ballarat district led to the establishment of numerous mining settlements, including Navigators.

The origin of the locality's name is generally believed to derive from the Navigator's Inn, which operated in the district during construction of the Geelong–Ballarat railway line in the early 1860s. The railway station established there was named "Navigator".

By the late nineteenth century, Navigators had become an established rural settlement with hotels, schools, railway facilities, and community institutions serving local miners and farming families.

A government primary school, Navigators School No. 942, operated within the locality before eventually closing. Historical records of the school are maintained by the Victorian Department of Education.

=== Early European settlement ===
A letter published in April 1860 in The Star, a Ballarat newspaper, provides one of the earliest descriptions of Navigators Village. According to the writer, the settlement had been established approximately sixteen months earlier by residents relocating from Buninyong to the nearest point of the new Geelong–Ballarat railway, reportedly on a site designated by government railway engineers.

Residents complained that blasting operations at the nearby ballast quarries were endangering homes and lives. The letter noted several incidents in which rocks damaged houses, including one occupied by a Mr McCormick, while another resident had suffered injury from flying quarry debris.

=== Railway construction ===
Navigators emerged as a settlement during construction of the Geelong–Ballarat railway. In March 1860, contemporary newspaper reports described "Navigators Village" as a settlement associated with railway works near Warrenheip.

At the time, approximately 400 men were employed on railway construction in the district. The village was reported to have two stores, a butcher's shop, and between twelve and thirteen houses, together with numerous tents and temporary dwellings occupied by railway workers. Construction activity included major earthworks, bridges, culverts and bluestone quarrying associated with the railway line.

=== 1860 faction riot ===
In September 1860, Navigators Village was the scene of a violent faction fight involving Irish residents of the district. Contemporary newspaper reports described the incident as a riot between rival "Hibernian" groups, with injuries including broken heads, black eyes and serious wounds.

The matter was heard in the Ballarat District Police Court later that month. Thomas Sexton and Thomas Shannon were charged with violently assaulting James Magree, who was reported to have suffered a severe scalp wound, loss of blood and facial injuries. Evidence given in court referred to tensions between groups associated with families including Magree, Sexton, Guthrie and Healy, and to a crowd of between 40 and 60 people gathering during the disturbance. Sexton and Shannon were committed to stand trial at the next Circuit Court.

A further police court hearing on 29 September 1860 dealt with a related assault charge against Michael Gleeson. Witnesses described the incident as part of the same disturbance at Navigators Village, involving fighting outside a local store and several men sustaining injuries.

=== Land settlement and occupation licences ===
By the early 1860s, many residents of Navigators had established permanent homes and gardens near the village. Contemporary reports concerning disputes over occupation licences referred to woodcutters and other settlers whose houses and gardens pre-dated the introduction of the twenty-acre land system. Newspaper reports suggested that legal disputes arose when occupation licence applications overlapped existing residences and small holdings.

== Community ==
=== Irish community ===
Contemporary newspaper reports indicate that a significant proportion of Navigators' early residents were Irish immigrants. Court proceedings and local news reports from the 1860s refer to residents bearing surnames including Healy, Guthrie, Gleeson, Lyons, Sexton, Shannon, Ryan, McCormick and Magree.

Newspaper accounts of disturbances at Navigators Village in 1860 described the participants as rival "Hibernian" factions and recorded references to settlers originating from Irish counties including Clare and Kilkenny.

A sporting report published in 1861 referred to ongoing rivalry between settlers from County Tipperary and County Clare, suggesting that regional Irish identities remained important within the community.

The later establishment of a Catholic school reflected the continuing presence of an Irish Catholic population within the district.

=== Community and recreation ===
By the early 1860s, Navigators Village was also used as a local recreation site. On Easter Monday 1861, the Warrenheip Races were held near the village, close to the railway line. A contemporary sporting newspaper described the racecourse as a picturesque mile-long course among the trees, with visitors, booth-holders, publicans and local farming families attending the event. The meeting included hack races, a railway plate and hurdle races for local horses.

Navigators maintains an active local community centred around the Navigators Community Centre. The facility includes tennis courts, barbecue facilities and meeting spaces for community groups and events.

=== Community facilities ===
In 2025, a new multi-purpose community hub was completed with funding support from Regional Development Victoria. The facility was designed to support local social, sporting and historical groups and improve accessibility for residents.

== Education ==
St Augustine's School was a Roman Catholic school at Navigators, registered as School No. 214 under the Registration of Teachers and Schools Act 1905. An application for registration dated 5 July 1906 recorded the Reverend Daniel Joseph Devane of Bungaree Junction as proprietor and Julia Deasy as the school's sole teacher. The school was classified as primary and sub-primary and had 37 pupils.

The school formed part of a group of Catholic schools administered from the Bungaree district. Correspondence from 1907 referred collectively to registered schools Nos. 212, 213 and 214, whose proprietor had been absent for several months through ill health.

The school building was also used for religious purposes. A Public Health Department inspection in 1913 recorded an altar and open fireplace in the classroom, together with an enclosed porch, adjoining store room, outside sheds and sanitary facilities. The department considered the premises in their existing condition unsuitable for use as a day school and required a series of improvements to lighting, ventilation, exits, fire safety, drainage and sanitary facilities. The classroom was limited to 40 pupils.

Some of the required works remained outstanding in 1917. Following further inspections, the Public Health Department reported that an additional exit near the altar had not been constructed, fire appliances had not been provided and deficiencies remained in the sanitary facilities. Julia Deasy was still associated with the school in April 1917, when she forwarded an Education Department notice concerning sanitary improvements to the parish priest.

Responsibility for the school subsequently passed from Devane to the Reverend M. Barrett. In January 1919, the Reverend Patrick J. Rehan requested that School No. 214, then registered in Barrett's name, be transferred to his own name.

By February 1926 the school had closed. Parish priest Michael Meally informed the Education Department that there were insufficient children of his congregation in the vicinity to support the cost of a teacher, although he indicated that the school could reopen if numbers increased. The Education Department subsequently directed that School No. 214 be removed from the register, with any future reopening requiring a new application for registration.

== See also ==
- Victorian gold rush
- Ballarat
- Geelong–Ballarat railway line
