= Fiskville, Victoria =

Fiskville
- Town
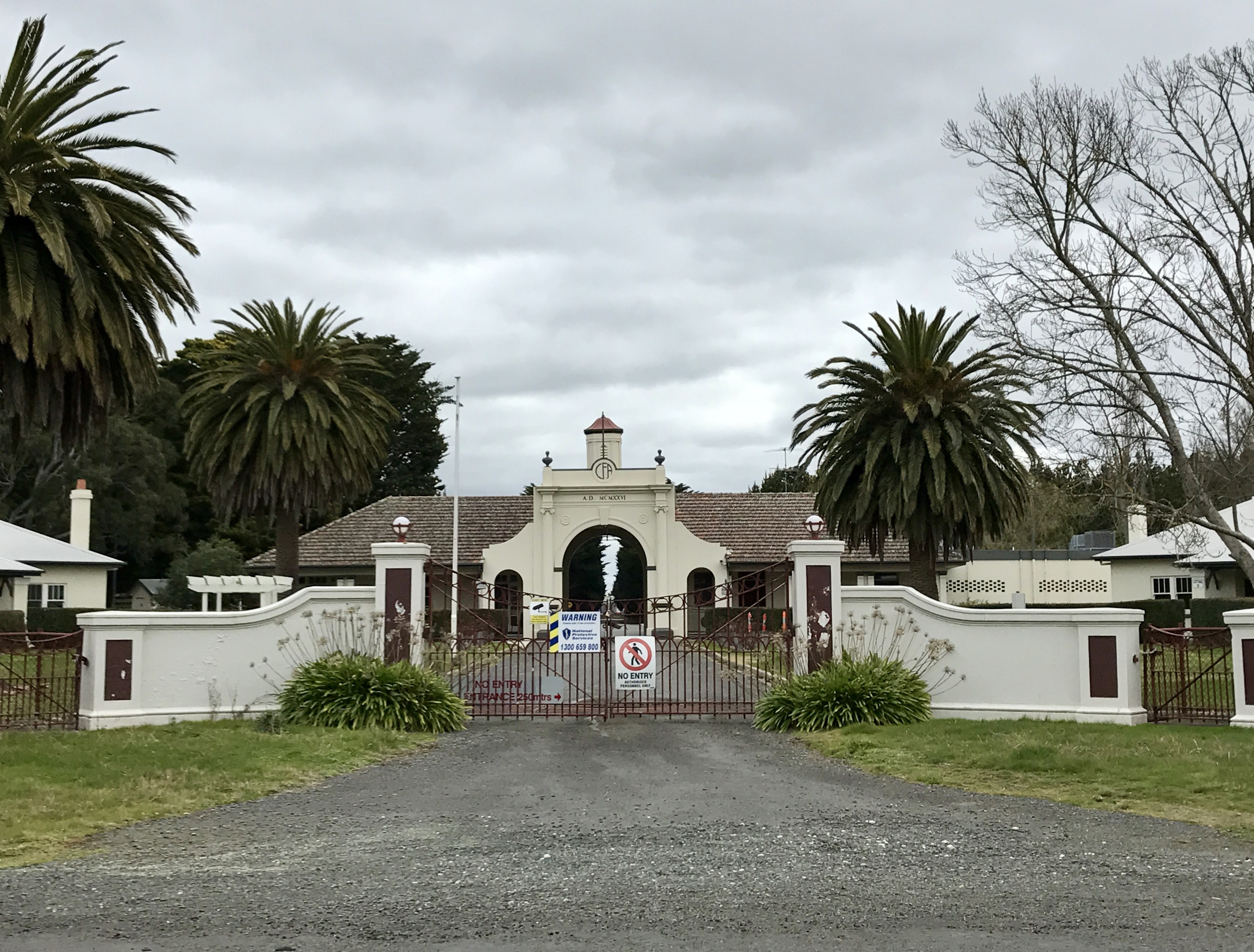
- CFA Training College

- Coordinates: 37.682317°S 144.227954°E
- Country: Australia
- State: Victoria
- LGA: Shire of Moorabool

Government
  - State electorate: Eureka
  - Federal divisions: Ballarat; Hawke

Population
  - Total: 18 (2021 census)
- Postcode: 3342

Fiskville is a locality in the Shire of Moorabool, Victoria, Australia. At the 2021 census, Fiskville had a population of 18.

The CFA Training College is located in Fiskville.
