= Springbank, Victoria =

Springbank Victoria
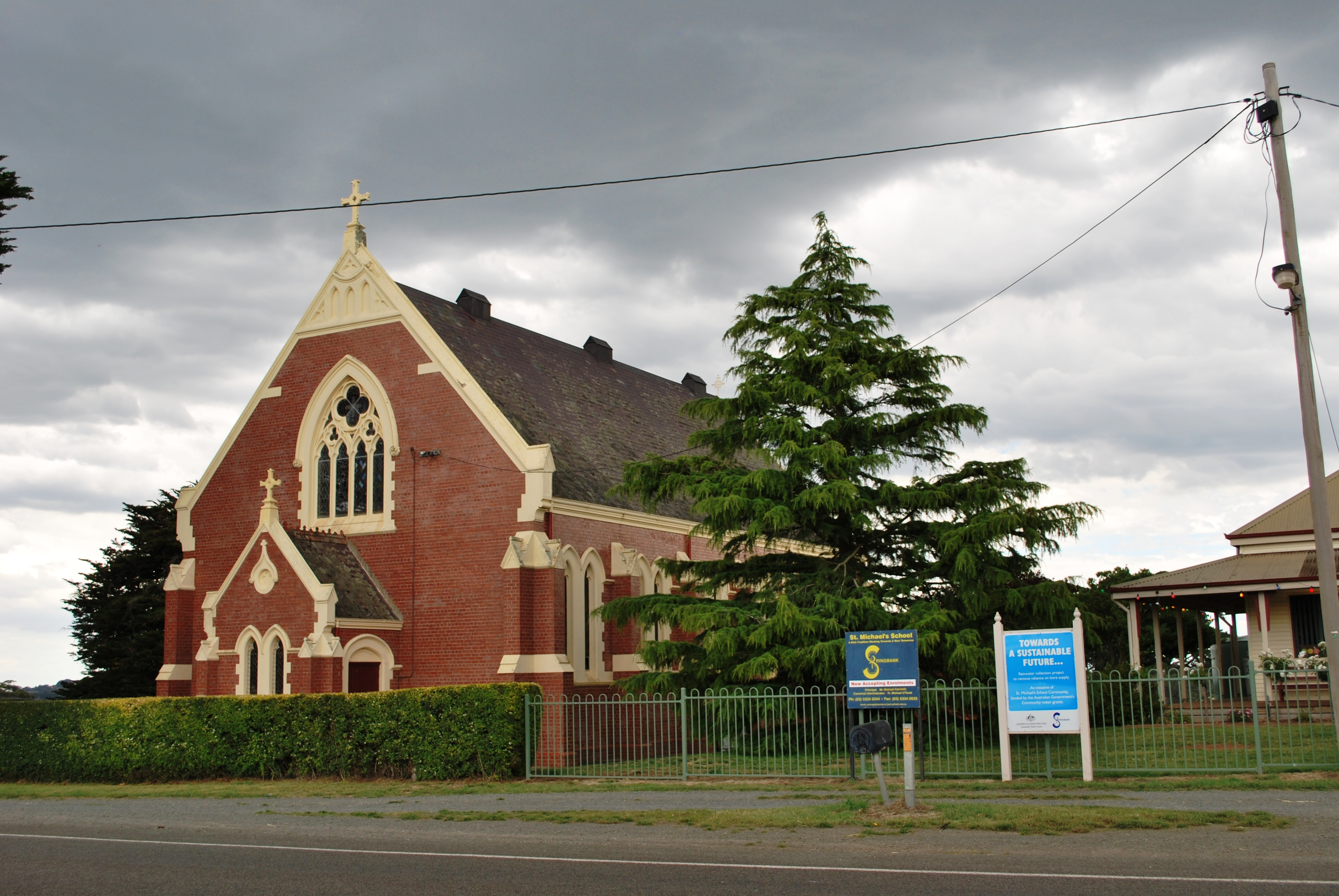
- St Michael's Roman Catholic church at Springbank

- Coordinates: 37°31′55″S 144°03′11″E
- Population: 111 (2016 census)
- Postcode(s): 3352
- Location: 112 km (70 mi) W of Melbourne; 22 km (14 mi) E of Ballarat; 3 km (2 mi) N of Wallace
- LGA(s): Shire of Moorabool
- State electorate(s): Eureka
- Federal division(s): Ballarat

Springbank is a locality in central Victoria, Australia. The locality is in the Shire of Moorabool, 99 kilometres (62 mi) west of the state capital, Melbourne and 22 kilometres (14 mi) east of the regional city of Ballarat.

At the 2016 census, Springbank had a population of 111.
