= Shire of Moorabool =

Coordinates: 37°36′00″S 144°15′00″E

- Local government area
- Location in Victoria

- Interactive map of Shire of Moorabool
- Country: Australia
- State: Victoria
- Region: Grampians
- Established: 1994
- Council seat: Ballan

Government
  - Mayor: Cr Tom Sullivan
  - State electorates: Eureka; Macedon; Melton
  - Federal divisions: Ballarat; Hawke

Area
  - Total: 2,111 km^{2} (815 sq mi)

Population
  - Total: 34,158 (2018)
  - Density: 16.181/km^{2} (41.908/sq mi)
- Gazetted: 6 May 1994
- Website: Shire of Moorabool
LGAs around Shire of Moorabool
Hepburn	Hepburn	Macedon Ranges
Ballarat	Shire of Moorabool	Melton
Golden Plains	Greater Geelong	Wyndham

The Shire of Moorabool is a local government area in Victoria, Australia, located in the western part of the state. It covers an area of 2,111 square kilometres (815 mi^{2}) and, in June 2018, had a population of 34,158. It includes the towns of Ballan, Bacchus Marsh, Balliang, Mount Wallace, Myrniong, Blackwood, Greendale, Gordon, Korweinguboora and Mount Egerton, Bungaree, Elaine and Wallace.

The Shire is governed and administered by the Moorabool Shire Council; its seat of local government and administrative centre is located at the council headquarters in Ballan, it also has service centres located in Bacchus Marsh and Darley. The Shire is named after the Moorabool River, a major geographical feature that meanders through the area, which is named after the Wathawurrung word moo-roo-bul referring to a Bunyip-like creature that lives in the river.

== History ==
The Shire of Moorabool was formed in May 1994 from the amalgamation of the Shire of Ballan and parts of the Shire of Bungaree and Shire of Buninyong. In December 1994, the Shire was expanded to include the Shire of Bacchus Marsh and the Balliang East area of the City of Werribee.

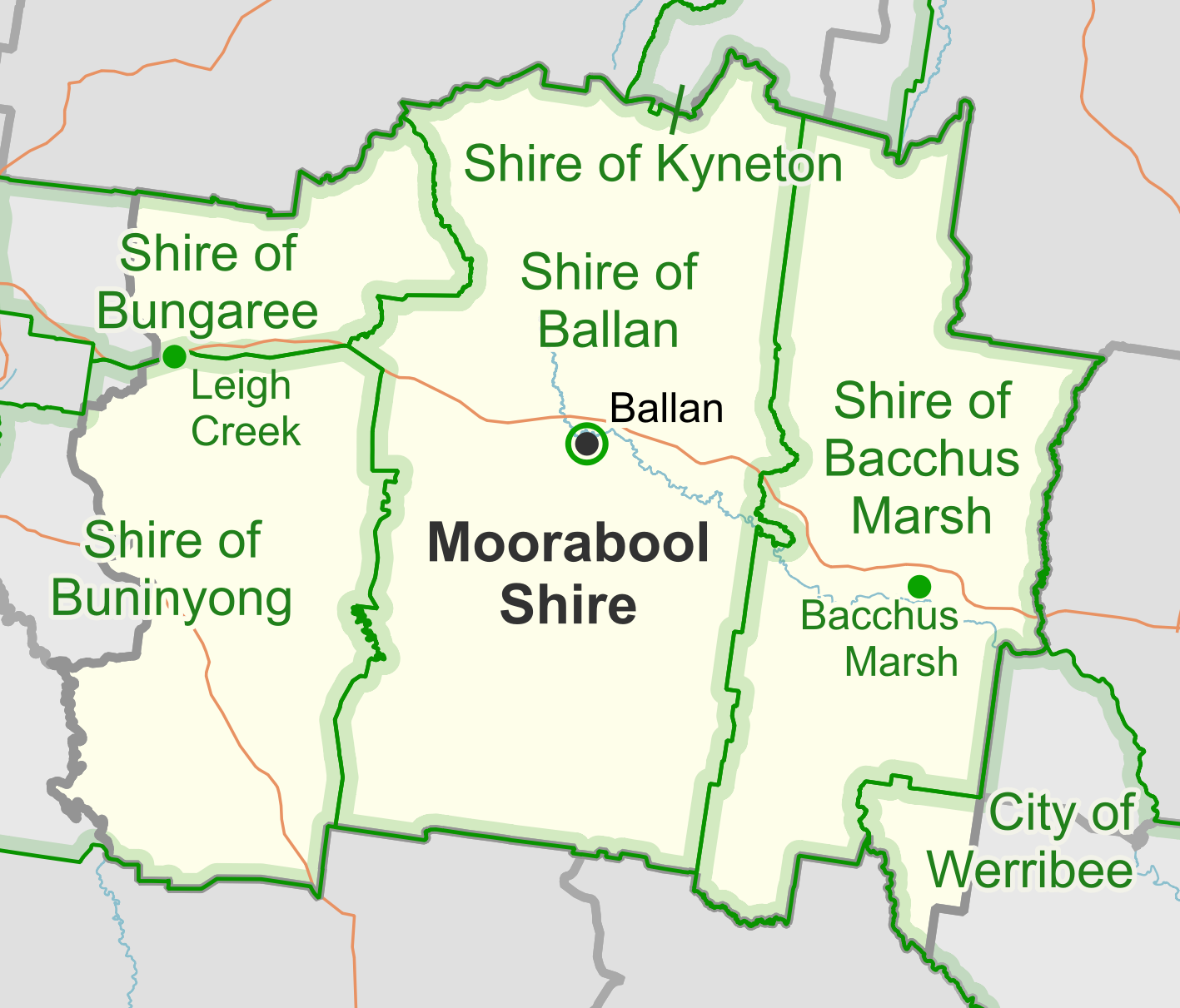
A map of Moorabool Shire showing the predecessor LGAs that overlapped the area before the 1994 local government amalgamations

== Council ==
=== Current composition ===
The council is composed of four wards and seven councillors, with four councillors elected to represent the East Moorabool Ward and one councillor per remaining ward elected to represent each of the other wards. Council Composition as of September 2022:

Ward	Councillor	Notes
Central Moorabool	Paul Tatchell	
East Moorabool	Rod Ward	
East Moorabool	Tonia Dudzik	Deputy Mayor
East Moorabool	Moira Berry	
East Moorabool	David Edwards	
West Moorabool	Tom Sullivan	Mayor
Woodlands	Ally Munari	

=== Administration and governance ===
The council meets in the council chambers at the council headquarters in the Ballan Municipal Offices, which is also the location of the council's administrative activities. It also provides customer services at both its administrative centre in Ballan, and its service centre in Bacchus Marsh.

== Townships and localities ==
In the 2021 census, the shire's population was 37,632, compared to 31,818 in the 2016 census.

Population
Locality	2016	2021
Bacchus Marsh	6,394	7,808
Ballan	2,985	3,392
Balliang^	290	254
Balliang East	147	199
Barkstead	42	41
Barrys Reef	36	39
Beremboke	149	165
Blackwood	295	387
Blakeville	29	43
Bolwarrah	25	48
Bullarook^	99	77
Bunding	55	61
Bungal	43	32
Bungaree	269	302
Buninyong^	3,714	3,797
Cargerie	35	38
Clarendon	145	163
Claretown	24	35
Clarkes Hill	67	75
Coimadai	416	409
Colbrook	29	41
Dales Creek	398	403
Darley	8,372	9,190
Dunnstown	244	259
Durham Lead^	392	408
Elaine	228	232
Fiskville	19	18
Glen Park^	103	110
Glenmore	63	75
Gordon	1,151	1,393
Greendale	602	623
Grenville^	99	113
Hopetoun Park	798	914
Ingliston	50	96
Korobeit	77	75
Korweinguboora^	168	196
Lal Lal	476	621
Leigh Creek	63	65
Lerderderg	0	0
Long Forest	361	343
Maddingley	3,453	5,491
Merrimu	374	397
Millbrook	156	180
Mollongghip^	89	105
Morrisons^	128	118
Mount Doran	130	118
Mount Egerton	582	706
Mount Wallace	113	117
Myrniong	404	387
Navigators	253	276
Parwan^	170	188
Pentland Hills	185	158
Pootilla	75	79
Rowsley	192	231
Scotsburn^	258	244
Spargo Creek	36	42
Springbank	111	117
Wallace	187	227
Warrenheip^	669	721
Wattle Flat^	97	104
Yendon	307	320

^ - Territory divided with another LGA

== See also ==
- List of places of worship in Moorabool Shire
