= Yendon =

- Town
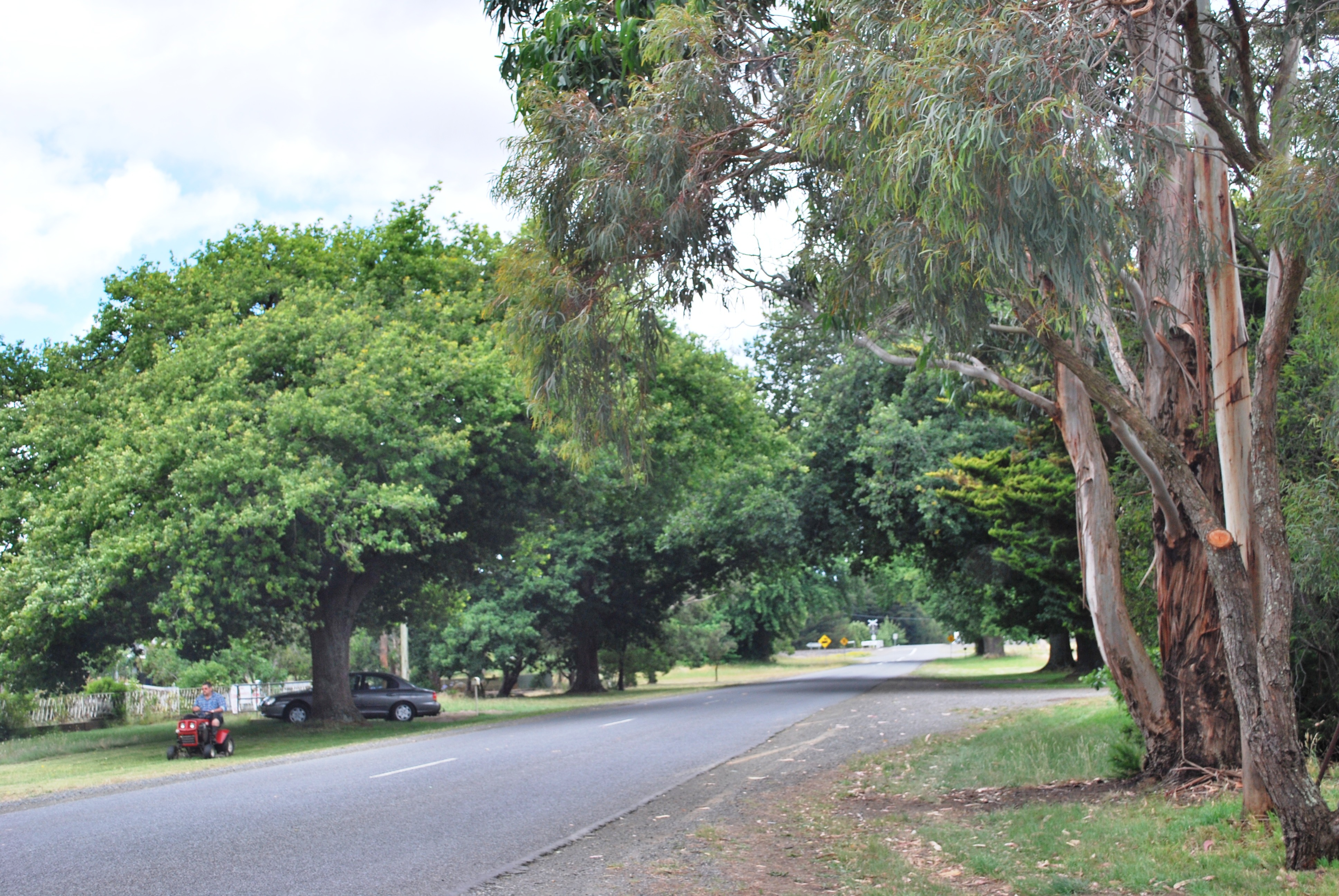
- A tree-lined street in Yendon

- Coordinates: 37°38′S 143°58′E
- Country: Australia
- State: Victoria
- LGA: Shire of Moorabool
- Location: 108 km (67 mi) WNW of Melbourne; 13 km (8.1 mi) SE of Ballarat

Government
  - State electorate: Eureka
  - Federal division: Ballarat

Population
  - Total: 307 (2016 census)
- Postcode: 3352

Yendon is a locality in Victoria, Australia. The town is located in the Shire of Moorabool, 108 kilometres (67 mi) west of the state capital, Melbourne and approximately 13 kilometres (8 mi) south-east of Ballarat. The town was originally called Buninyong East, but was changed in 1879 to Yendon, believed to be an Indigenous Australian word meaning "waterhole".

At the 2016 census, Yendon had a population of 307.

== History ==
The Geelong-Ballarat railway line passed through Yendon, and for a while in the early 1860s it was the terminus of the line. The station was originally called Buninyong, but was changed to Yendon in 1876. A substantial two-storey bluestone station building was opened in 1862. It was demolished in 1969, and the stone was reused to construct garden retaining walls at the Ballarat Institute of Advanced Education, now Federation University.

Yendon's first school, the Common School, opened in 1864, and became Yendon State School in 1879. It closed at the end of 1993.
