= Leigh Creek, Victoria =

Leigh Creek Victoria
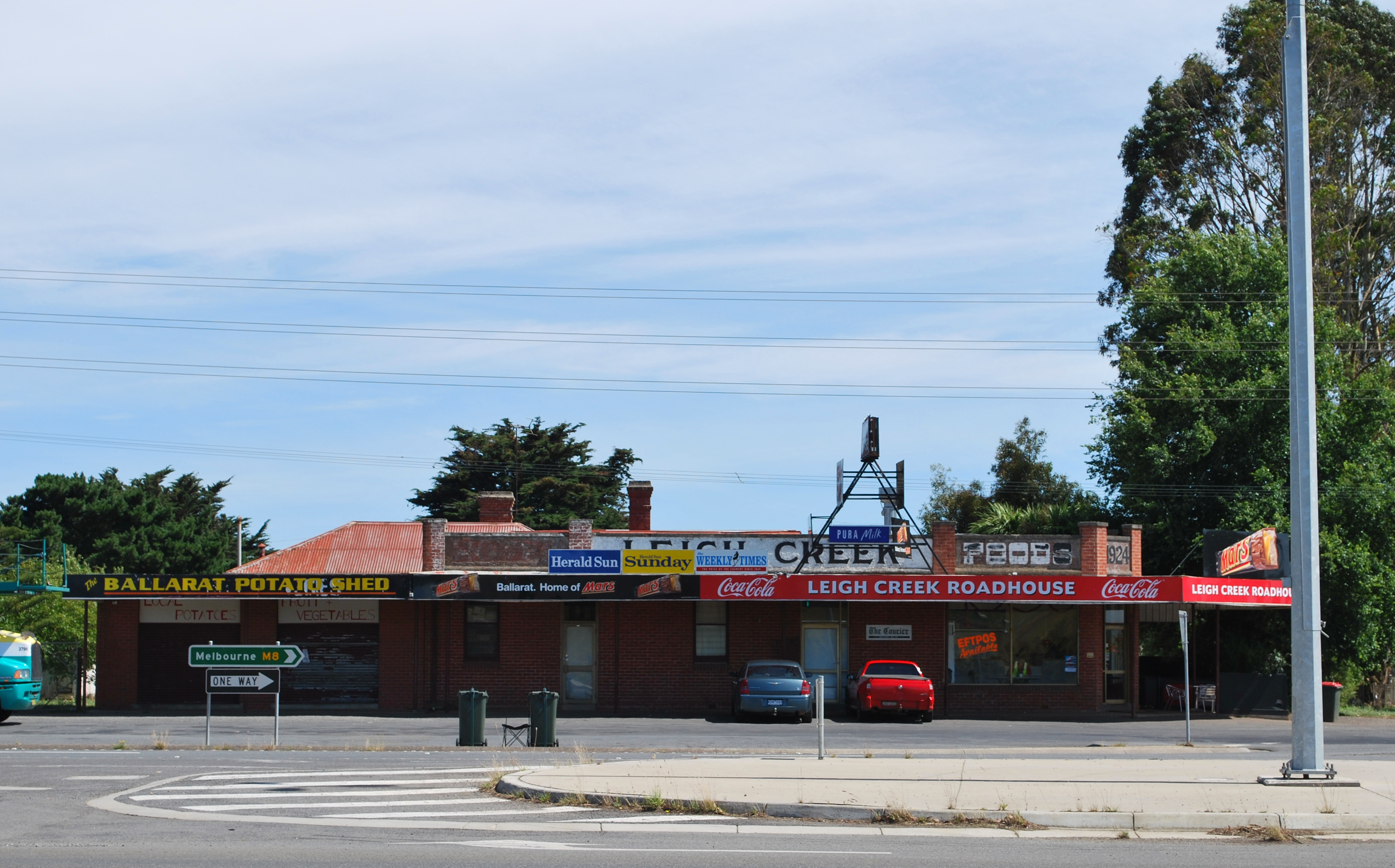
- The Leigh Creek roadhouse on the Western Highway

- Coordinates: 37°33′31″S 143°57′30″E
- Population: 63 (2016 census)
- Postcode(s): 3352
- Location: 106 km (66 mi) WNW of Melbourne; 11 km (7 mi) E of Ballarat
- LGA(s): Shire of Moorabool
- State electorate(s): Eureka
- Federal division(s): Ballarat

Leigh Creek is a locality in central Victoria, Australia. The locality is in the Shire of Moorabool, 106 kilometres (66 mi) west of the state capital, Melbourne and 11 kilometres (6.8 mi) east of the regional city of Ballarat.

At the 2016 census, Leigh Creek had a population of 63.
