= Shire of Ballarat =

Coordinates: 37°25′S 143°43′E

- Local government area
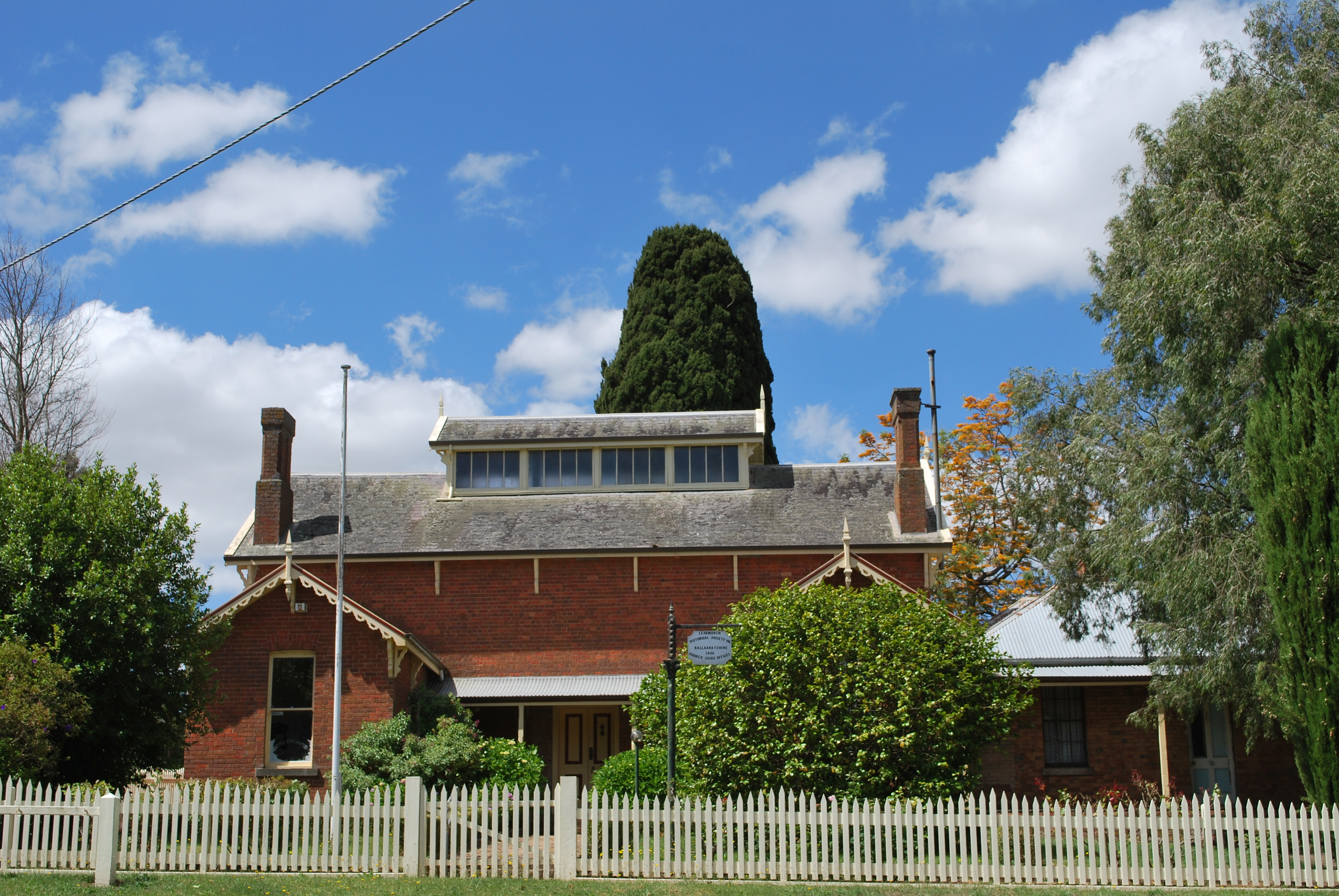
- Historic shire office at Learmonth

- The Shire of Ballarat as at its dissolution in 1994
- Country: Australia
- State: Victoria
- Region: Grampians
- Established: 1856
- Council seat: Wendouree

Area
  - Total: 481.74 km^{2} (186.00 sq mi)

Population
  - Total(s): 19,530 (1992)
  - Density: 40.541/km^{2} (105.000/sq mi)
- County: Ripon, Talbot, Grenville
LGAs around Shire of Ballarat
Lexton	Talbot and Clunes	Creswick
Lexton	Shire of Ballarat	Bungaree
Ripon	Grenville	Ballaarat

The Shire of Ballarat was a local government area immediately to the northwest and west of the regional city of Ballarat, Victoria, Australia. The shire covered an area of 481.74 square kilometres (186.0 sq mi), and existed from 1856 until 1994.

== History ==
Ballarat was first incorporated as a road district on 7 October 1856, and became a shire on 24 November 1863.

Although much of the detail of the Ballarat Shire Council is obscure, Donald Gunn was a Councillor between August 1865 - June 1867, and again between August 1870 - August 1876. He was President of the Shire from 11 November 1872 until 21 October 1874. In 1964, the shire offices moved from Learmonth to Wendouree.

On 6 May 1994, the Shire of Ballarat was abolished, and along with the City of Ballaarat, the Borough of Sebastopol and parts of the Shires of Bungaree, Buninyong, Grenville and Ripon, was merged into the newly created City of Ballarat.

== Wards ==
The Shire of Ballarat was divided into four ridings on 11 November 1952, each of which elected three councillors:

- Alfredton Riding
- Central Riding
- Rural Riding
- Showgrounds Riding

== Towns and localities ==
- Addington
- Ascot
- Alfredton (shared with the City of Ballaarat)
- Bald Hills
- Ballarat North
- Blowhard
- Burrumbeet
- Cardigan
- Cardigan Village
- Coghills Creek
- Dowling
- Glendaruel
- Invermay Park
- Learmonth
- Miners Rest
- Mitchell Park
- Mount Rowan
- Sulky
- Tourello
- Weatherboard
- Wendouree*
- Windermere

* Council seat.

== Population ==
Year	Population
1954	6,145
1958	7,970*
1961	10,102
1966	12,254
1971	14,405
1976	17,037
1981	18,845
1986	19,110
1991	18,802

* Estimate in 1958 Victorian Year Book.
