= City of Ballaarat =

Coordinates: 37°33′S 143°51′E

City of Ballaarat Victoria
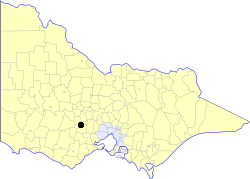
- Location in Victoria
- The City of Ballaarat as at its dissolution in 1994
- Population: 35,500 (1992)
  - Density: 1,028.4/km^{2} (2,664/sq mi)
- Established: 1855
- Area: 34.52 km^{2} (13.3 sq mi)
- Council seat: Ballarat Central
- Region: Grampians
- County: Grenville, Grant
LGAs around City of Ballaarat:
Ballarat	Ballarat	Bungaree
Ballarat	City of Ballaarat	Bungaree
Grenville	Sebastopol	Buninyong

The City of Ballaarat was a local government area covering the inner suburbs of the regional city of Ballarat, Victoria, Australia. The city covered an area of 34.52 square kilometres (13.3 sq mi), and existed from 1855 until 1994.

== History ==
The spelling of the name was a source of constant confusion. It originated from two Aboriginal words "balla arat", meaning "resting place". The municipality used the spelling Ballaarat as part of its corporate description, but the town itself came to be known as Ballarat.

Ballaarat originated in two boroughs, incorporated two years apart; the Borough of Ballaarat was first incorporated on 10 December 1855, becoming a town on 10 October 1863 and a city on 9 September 1870. The Borough of Ballaarat East, meanwhile, came into being on 1 May 1857 and became a town on 23 August 1872. It was divided into North, Central and South wards in 1889. On 25 May 1921, the town merged into Ballaarat, which was redivided into four wards. On 2 April 1930, the combined entity absorbed part of the Shire of Bungaree.

On 6 May 1994, the City of Ballaarat was abolished, and along with the Borough of Sebastopol, the Shire of Ballarat and parts of the Shires of Bungaree, Buninyong, Grenville and Ripon, was merged into the newly created City of Ballarat.

== Wards ==
The City of Ballaarat was divided into four wards on 25 May 1921, each of which elected three councillors:

- Lake Ward
- Park Ward
- Black Hill Ward
- Eureka Ward

== Towns and localities ==
- Bakery Hill
- Ballarat Central*
- Ballarat East
- Black Hill
- Canadian
- Eureka
- Golden Point
- Lake Gardens
- Lake Wendouree
- Lucas
- Mount Clear
- Mount Pleasant
- Newington
- Redan
- Soldiers Hill

* Council seat.

== Population ==
Year	Population
1954	39,945
1958	42,280*
1961	41,037
1966	41,650
1971	39,778
1976	37,863
1981	35,681
1986	34,806
1991	34,501

* Estimate in the 1958 Victorian Year Book.
