= Disappearance of Samantha Murphy =

2024 disappearance of Australian woman

- Date: 4 February 2024
- Location: Ballarat, Victoria, Australia
- Missing: Samantha Murphy
- Accused: Patrick Orren Stephenson
- Charges: Murder
- Publication bans: Initial court suppression of name of accused

Samantha Murphy was a 51-year-old Australian woman who went missing on 4 February 2024. She left her Ballarat, Victoria, home for a morning run, but failed to return home.

Searches carried out over several days failed to find any evidence of what happened to Murphy. Victoria Police treated the disappearance as suspicious, later stating that they believed she was dead. On 6 March 2024, a man was arrested in connection with her disappearance and was subsequently charged with murder. Murphy's body has not been found, although some of her belongings were found approximately 20 kilometres (12 mi) south of Ballarat.

== Background ==
Born on 30 March 1972, Samantha Murphy was a 51-year-old Australian woman who lived in Ballarat, a large rural city in the Central Highlands region of Victoria. She was the mother of three children, and ran a small business with her husband, Michael, near the family home. Murphy was Caucasian, approximately 173 centimetres (5 ft 8 in), slim, and had shoulder-length blonde hair.

== Disappearance ==
On 3 February 2024, Murphy had dinner with her husband and some mutual friends at their home. During this dinner, Murphy said she had been regularly walking and running in local bushland and planned to run 14 kilometres (8.7 mi) at Woowookarung Regional Park the next day. Murphy was captured by a CCTV camera the following day at approximately 7 am AEDT in the driveway of her home. She was due to attend a family event at 11 am. After she failed to attend, her family contacted police to report her missing.

== Investigation and search ==
1 07:00 Eureka Street - Murphy leaves home and sighted on neighbors CCTV.
2 Later that morning Murphy's phone and watch devices GPS pinged Mount Clear.
3 Durham Lead - Phone and wallet found by dam.

Murphy's mobile phone signalled a cellular tower in Buninyong, approximately 14 kilometres (8.7 mi) from her home, although signals from multiple towers are required to triangulate the location of a mobile device. The SOS function of Murphy's Apple Watch, which she was wearing on her run, was not activated. GPS analysis showed that she had run 7 kilometres (4.3 mi) through Woowookarung Regional Park to Mount Clear, at which point there may have been an "anomaly" or "disturbance" in the GPS data.

For several days, Victoria Police (including the Search and Rescue Squad, dog squad, Mounted Branch, and Air Wing), the Victoria State Emergency Service, Parks Victoria and the Country Fire Authority conducted an extensive search of the park and surrounding areas. The search initially commenced at Woowookarung Regional Park and nearby bushland; no sign of Murphy or her belongings were found and police ruled out the possibility of her having suffered a medical episode or leaving the area of her own accord. The search then expanded to the wider Ballarat area, including Black Hill and Brown Hill.

After five days, the search was scaled back and the Missing Persons Squad took over the investigation. Members of the public, both local to Ballarat and from across Victoria, continued searching. By 23 February, police said they suspected Murphy was deceased and believed "one or more parties" may have been involved in her disappearance.

On 6 March 2024, Patrick Orren Stephenson, a 22-year-old male from Scotsburn, was arrested in connection with Murphy's disappearance. The following day, he was charged with murder. The police hypothesis is that Stephenson, who was not known to Murphy's family, killed her at Mount Clear. Stephenson's name was initially subject to a suppression order.

On 29 May, Murphy's wallet containing her ID cards and mobile phone was found on the bank of an agricultural dam during a targeted search of a property near Durham Lead, approximately 4 kilometres (2.5 mi) south of Buninyong. Murphy's body has not been found.

== Response ==
Forensic psychologist and podcaster Tim Watson-Munro described the disappearance as "very unusual" and stated he had never before heard of a case involving a person going missing in the same way as Murphy.

A local community member set up a group on Facebook to coordinate local volunteers. As the membership grew, so too did posts speculating about Murphy's disappearance alongside conspiracy theories and claims by psychic mediums. The group's creator, who worked openly with detectives to utilise the groups information, advocated for closure of the group due to the local speculation and online trolls interrupting the investigation. Similar activity was seen on Reddit, and the Commissioner of Victoria Police, Shane Patton, called on the public to cease speculating.

== See also ==
- List of people who disappeared mysteriously (2000–present)
