= Shire of Buninyong =

Coordinates: 37°39′S 143°53′E

Shire of Buninyong Victoria
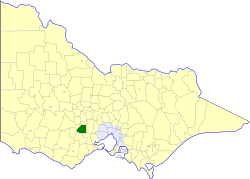
- Location in Victoria
- The Shire of Buninyong as at its dissolution in 1994
- Population: 12,760 (1992)
  - Density: 16.253/km^{2} (42.094/sq mi)
- Established: 1858
- Area: 785.1 km^{2} (303.1 sq mi)
- Council seat: Buninyong
- Region: Grampians
- County: Grenville, Grant
LGAs around Shire of Buninyong:
Ballaarat	Bungaree	Bungaree
Grenville	Shire of Buninyong	Ballan
Grenville	Leigh	Bannockburn

The Shire of Buninyong was a local government area south and southeast of the regional city of Ballarat, Victoria, Australia. The shire covered an area of 785.1 square kilometres (303.1 sq mi), and existed from 1858 until 1994.

== History ==
Buninyong was first incorporated as a road district on 9 July 1858, and became a shire on 18 February 1864. On 1 October 1915, it absorbed the Borough of Buninyong, which had been created on 15 July 1859.

On 6 May 1994, the Shire of Buninyong was abolished, and was split between the newly created City of Ballarat and Shire of Moorabool. A small section near Grenville was transferred to the newly created Golden Plains Shire.

== Wards ==
The Shire of Buninyong was divided into three ridings, each of which elected three councillors:

- Centre Riding
- West Riding
- Northeast Riding

== Towns and localities ==
- Buninyong*
- Cambrian Hill
- Canadian
- Clarendon
- Dunnstown
- Durham Lead
- Elaine
- Grenville
- Lal Lal
- Magpie
- Millbrook
- Mount Clear
- Mount Helen
- Scotchman
- Warrenheip
- Yendon

* Council seat.

== Population ==
Year	Population
1954	3,953
1958	4,190*
1961	4,313
1966	4,808
1971	5,124
1976	6,271
1981	8,096
1986	9,959
1991	12,140

* Estimate in 1958 Victorian Year Book.
