= Canadian, Victoria =

Canadian
- Suburb
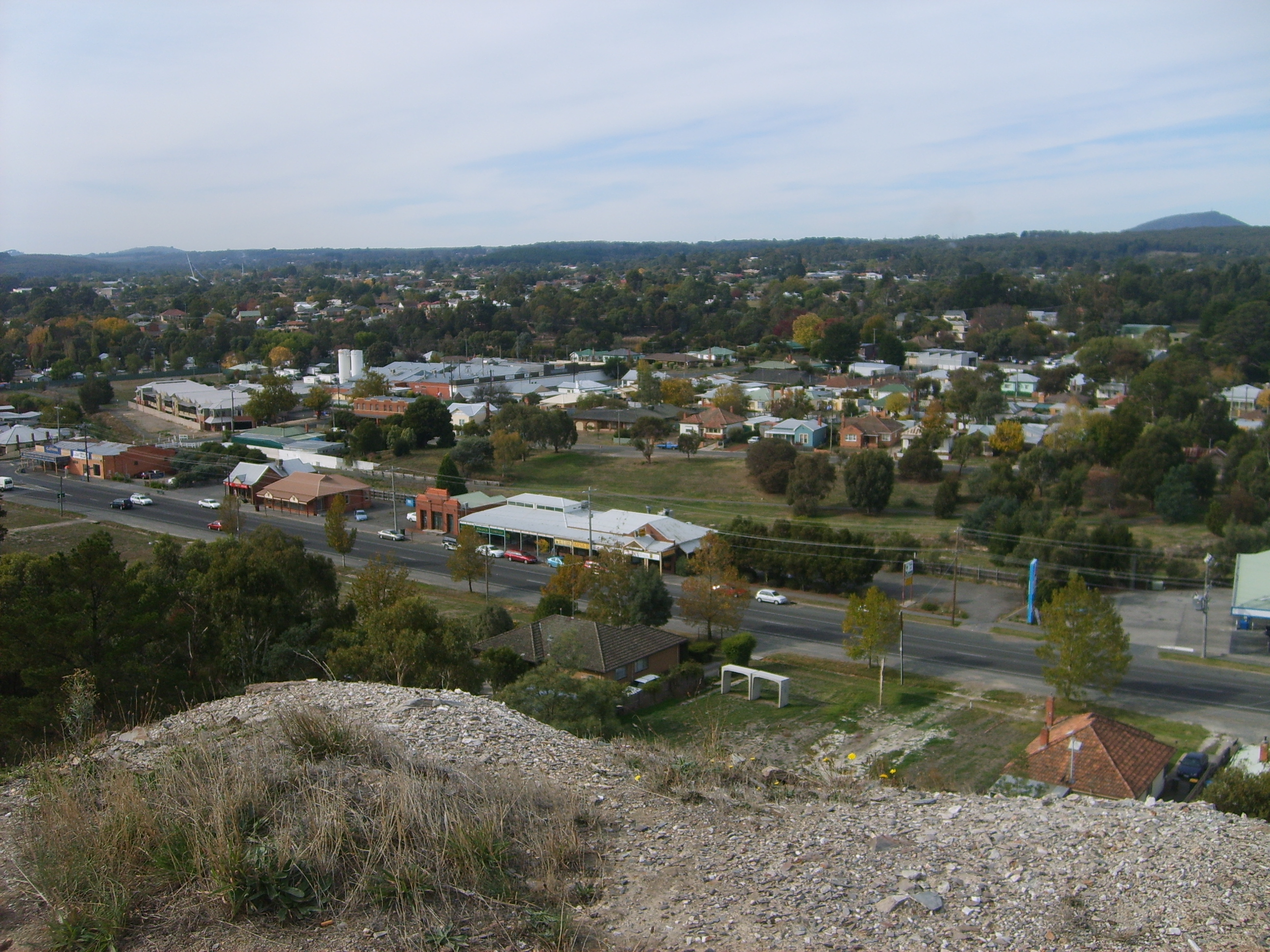
- A view over the suburb of Canadian from the Sovereign Hill open air museum's poppet head.

- Interactive map of Canadian
- Coordinates: 37.576°S 143.877°E
- Country: Australia
- State: Victoria
- City: Ballarat
- LGA: City of Ballarat
- Location: 4 km (2.5 mi) SE of Ballarat

Government
  - State electorate: Eureka
  - Federal division: Ballarat

Area
  - Total: 7.7 km^{2} (3.0 sq mi)

Population
  - Total: 4,098 (2021 census)
  - Density: 532/km^{2} (1,378/sq mi)
- Postcode: 3350
Suburbs around Canadian
Ballarat East	Ballarat East	Warrenheip
Golden Point, Mount Pleasant	Canadian	Navigators
Magpie, Mount Clear	Mount Clear, Mount Helen	Navigators

Canadian is a residential suburb in Ballarat, Victoria, located 3km south-east of Ballarat Central. At the 2021 census, Canadian had a population of 4,098.

A small gold rush at Canadian Gully occurred in September 1852, during the period known as the Victorian gold rush. The discoveries of three large gold nuggets in January 1853—including the Canadian, then the largest recorded nugget ever—led to another gold rush which lasted for several years. Canadian became its own suburb. A post office opened in 1886 and closed in 1988. Urban settlement had spread to Canadian by the 1980s.

It is primarily a residential area, but has a school, a small shopping area, a motel and several parks and reserves including Canadian Lake and also Sparrow Ground. The Sparrow Ground Reserve was regenerated with the help of community groups and council, and replanted with native trees to encourage wildlife to return.

== Geography ==
Canadian is a residential suburb located approximately 3 kilometres (1.9 mi) south-east of Ballarat Central. The suburb's residential part is located along the Ballarat-Buninyong Road.

== History ==
During the first years of the Victorian gold rush, Canadian Gully (Note: Canadian Gully was located north of the junction of Elsworth Street and Main Road, within the southern boundary of what is now Sovereign Hill.) became one of the most prominent diggings on the Ballarat goldfields. January 1853 marked the discoveries of three gold nuggets each weighing over 1,000 ounces (28 kg) — including the Canadian, then the largest recorded nugget ever — and brought a gold rush to Ballarat greater than the original rush at Golden Point in 1851. The gully and the Canadian deep lead (buried gold-bearing riverbed) below it were extremely rich, and one area known as the "Jewellers' Shop" yielded over a ton of gold. However, the rush ended within several years and the nuggets found there were surpassed both in size and in public memory by later discoveries, such as the Welcome Stranger.

The Canadian Gully and Canadian Lead give their name to the existing suburb of Canadian. The gully itself were named after a digger known as Canadian Swift. A post office opened on 1 March 1886 and closed in 1988, while a railway station at Canadian was part of the Buninyong railway line, which existed from 1889 to 1947.

Ellsworth Street became the boundary between the City of Ballarat and the now non-existent Shire of Buninyong, putting Canadian in both municipalities. The suburb was historically not well-regarded, because Buninyong Road sometimes became marsh, and there was a lepers' camp nearby in southern Golden Point. By the 1980s, urban settlement had spread to Canadian.

== Parks ==
Canadian is also the location of Lake Esmond, which was formerly a quarry for Eureka Tile Works until 1982, and later converted into a lake and recreational area that opened on 6 June 1988. Lake Esmond is often used by various Rotary Clubs, and is maintained by the City of Ballarat, and the Rotary Club of East Ballarat.

== Education ==
Historically, the suburb lacked a school and children were sent to the Eureka Street, Golden Point, and Richards Street Primary Schools. In 1997, Canadian Lead Primary School was formed from the amalgamation of these three schools, as well as the school in Millbrook. It is located in the suburb's north, beside Pennyweight Gully Creek. Canadian does not have a high school, and parts of the suburb are either zoned for Woodmans Hill Secondary College or Mount Clear College.
