= Glendaruel, Victoria =

Glendaruel
- Suburb
- Interactive map of Glendaruel
- Coordinates: 37.3436°S 143.7315°E
- Country: Australia
- State: Victoria
- City: Ballarat
- LGA: City of Ballarat

Government
  - State electorate: Ripon
  - Federal division: Ballarat

Population
  - Total: 49 (2021 census)
- Postcode: 3363
Suburbs around Glendaruel
	Mount Beckworth
Mount Bolton	Glendaruel	Tourello
	Coghills Creek

Glendaruel is a locality on the Northern rural fringe of the City of Ballarat municipality in Victoria, Australia. At the 2021 census, Glendaruel had a population of 49.
