= Mount Bolton, Victoria =

Mount Bolton Victoria
- Coordinates: 37.3722°S 143.6956°E
- Population: 29 (2021 census)
- Postcode(s): 3352
- LGA(s): City of Ballarat
- State electorate(s): Ripon
- Federal division(s): Ballarat, Wannon
Localities around Mount Bolton:
| | Mount Beckworth |
| Waubra | Mount Bolton | Coghills Creek |
| | Addington |

Mount Bolton is a locality in western Victoria, Australia. At the 2021 census, Mount Bolton and the surrounding area had a population of 29.
