= Glendonald =

- Suburb
- Interactive map of Glendonald
- Coordinates: 37.3509°S 143.8420°E
- Country: Australia
- State: Victoria
- City: Ballarat
- LGA: City of Ballarat

Government
  - State electorate: Ripon
  - Federal division: Ballarat

Population
  - Total: N/A (2021 census)
- Postcode: 3364
Suburbs around Glendonald
| | Clunes |
| Tourello | Glendonald | Creswick North |
| | Ascot |

Glendonald is a locality on the Northern rural fringe of the City of Ballarat municipality in Victoria, Australia. At the 2021 census, Glendonald did not have a population able to be recorded.

Helen Elizabeth Gillan, a leading campaigner for women, was born here in the 1870s.
