= Helen Elizabeth Gillan =

Voluntary worker and social reformer (1873–1955)

- Born: c. 1873; Glendonald, Victoria
- Died: 30 October 1955 (aged 81–82); Loch, Victoria

Helen Elizabeth Gillan (c. 1873 – 30 October 1955) was an Australian voluntary worker and social reformer associated with the National Council of Women of Australia. She was associated with the NCW's celebration of 100 years of pioneer women in Victoria and leading the organisation of 30,000 volunteer women in Victoria during World War II.

== Life ==
Gillan is thought to have been born in 1873. She was born in the Glendonald area of the City of Ballarat.

She became the treasurer of the Victoria branch of the National Council of Women of Australia (NCW) in 1927. She took an interest in divorce laws and the treatment of children with an intellectual disability. On the latter subject she undertook an investigation and after travelling to the UK she reported back to the NCW.

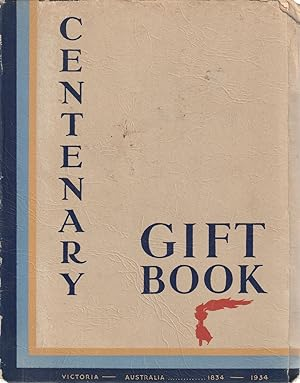
1934 Centenary Gift Book for Victoria State (organised by women)

Victoria formed the Centenary Celebrations Council to co-ordinate the celebration of the state's centenary of European occupation. The council published a history on the last 100 years of life in Victoria. The cover page showed the first men from Europe meeting aboriginal men. The NCW were not impressed that the Centenary Celebrations Council was an all male affair and they formed the Women's Centenary Council with Gillan as treasurer in 1933. The Women's Centenary Council published a Centenary Gift Book in 1934 and they constructed a memorial garden dedicated to pioneer women.

In 1939, the Australian prime minister announced that money was being made available to create state organisations to support a Women's Voluntary National Register. £330 was put aside for Victoria and the register opened in Melbourne Town Hall on 24 March 1939. The NCW was to manage the initiative and more specifically Gillan who became the honorary registrar and "Minnie" Williamson who worked as the honorary secretary. The register was a success and over the course of the war 30,000 names were added. These women volunteered to work for the government in the evenings doing unpaid work to assist the war effort. The office was closed in 1944 and Gillan write the unit's history "A Brief history of the National Council of Women of Victoria, 1902-1945". It was published in 1945 and she was given a gold badge for long service by the NCW.

Gillan was treasurer of the Victoria branch of the NCW until 1951.

Gillan died in Loch in Gippsland in 1955. She had never married and few details are known of her private life.
