= Miners Rest, Victoria =

Miners Rest Ballarat, Victoria
- Coordinates: 37.486°S 143.757°E
- Population: 3,829 (2021 census)
- Postcode(s): 3352
- Location: 11 km (7 mi) from Ballarat Central
- LGA(s): City of Ballarat
- State electorate(s): Ripon
- Federal division(s): Ballarat
Suburbs around Miners Rest:
Learmonth	Blowhard	Sulky
Windermere	Miners Rest	Mount Rowan
Cardigan	Mitchell Park	Wendouree

Miners Rest is a suburb north of Ballarat, Victoria, Australia on the north-western rural-urban fringe of the city, 11 kilometres (6.8 mi) northwest of the Central Business District. The population at the 2021 census was 3,829.

Miners Rest is a semi-rural town with a very small township and commercial area. It is located to the north of the Western Freeway.

== History ==
The original Township of Miners Rest, surveyed in 1854, is located at the northern end of the district.

== Education ==
The local primary school is Miners Rest Primary School. The local secondary school catchment is Mount Rowan Secondary College.
