= City of Ballarat =

Coordinates: 37°33′00″S 143°51′00″E

- Local government area
- Map of the City of Ballarat's municipal borders, urban areas and location in Victoria

- Interactive map of City of Ballarat
- Country: Australia
- State: Victoria
- Region: Grampians
- Established: 6 May 1994
- Council seat: Central

Government
  - Mayor: Cr Tracey Hargreaves
  - State electorates: Eureka; Ripon; Wendouree
  - Federal division: Ballarat

Area
  - Total: 739 km^{2} (285 sq mi)

Population
  - Total: 127,066 (2026)
  - Density: 171.94/km^{2} (445.33/sq mi)
- Gazetted: 6 May 1994
- Website: City of Ballarat
LGAs around City of Ballarat
| Pyrenees | Hepburn | Hepburn |
| Pyrenees | City of Ballarat | Moorabool |
| Golden Plains | Golden Plains | Moorabool |

The City of Ballarat is a local government area in the west of the state of Victoria, Australia. It covers an area of 739 square kilometres (285 mi^{2}) and, in June 2026, had a population of 127,066. It is primarily urban with the vast majority of its population living in the Greater Ballarat urban area, while other significant settlements within the LGA include Buninyong, Waubra, Learmonth and Addington.

The city is governed and administered by the Ballarat City Council; its seat of local government and administrative centre is located at the council headquarters in Ballarat, it also has a service centre located in Buninyong. The city is named after the main urban settlement lying in the centre-south of the LGA, Ballarat, which is also the LGA's most populous urban area with a population of 122,691.

== History ==
The City of Ballarat was formed on 6 May 1994 from the amalgamation of the City of Ballaarat, Shire of Ballarat, Borough of Sebastopol and parts of the Shire of Bungaree, Shire of Buninyong, Shire of Grenville and Shire of Ripon.

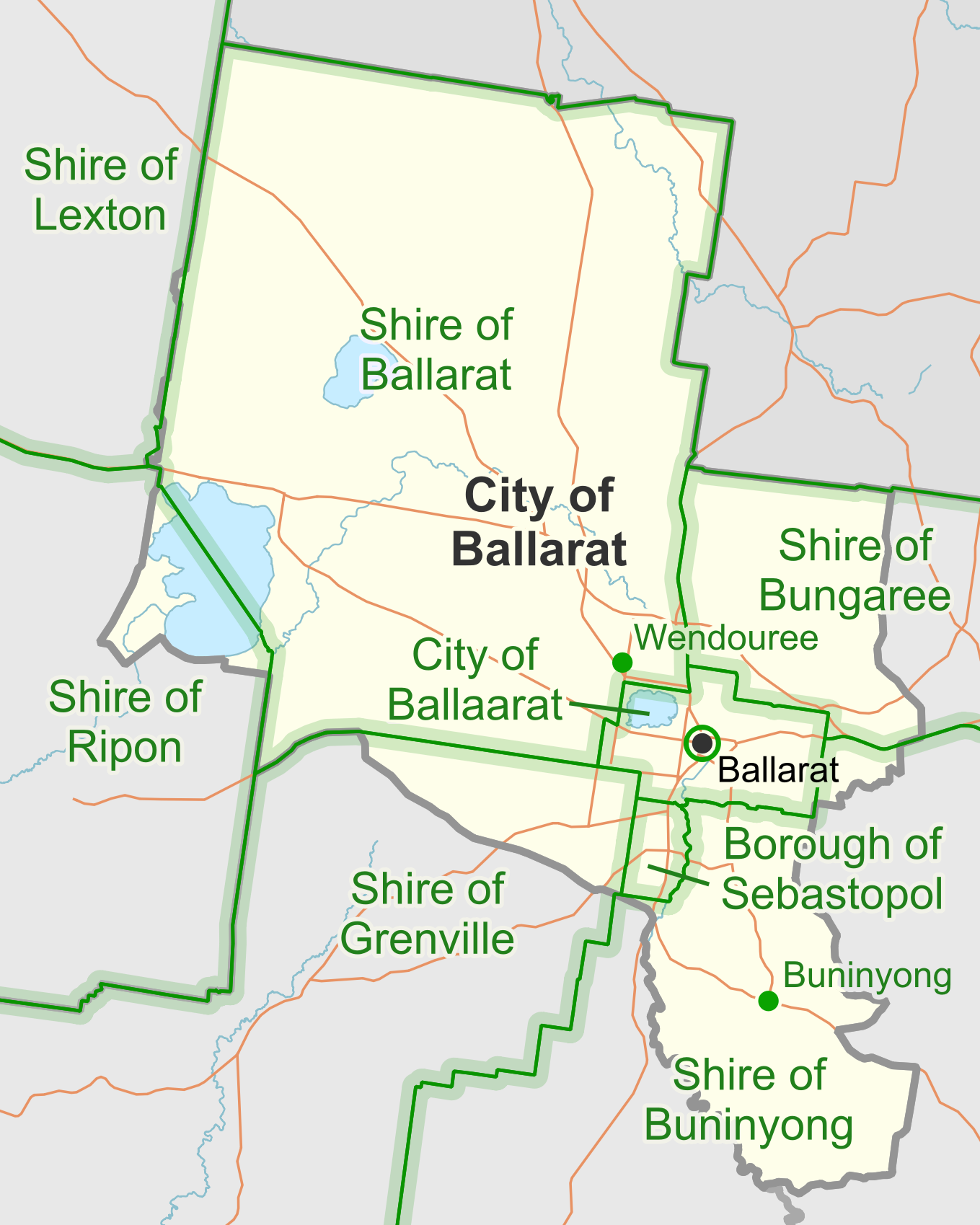
The City of Ballarat's predecessor LGAs (green) as they were in 1994. The administrative centres of the former LGAs are marked by green dots.

== Council ==
=== Current composition ===
2024 ward boundaries. Expand the map and click on a ward to see the ward name.

The council has nine elected councillors, each representing a municipal electoral ward. The current council, elected in November 2024, is:

| Ward | Party | Councillor | Notes |
|---|---|---|---|
| Alfredton | Independent | Damon Saunders | |
| Brown Hill | Independent | Ted Lapkin | |
| Buninyong | Liberal | Ben Taylor | Deputy mayor |
| Central | Liberal | Samantha McIntosh | |
| Delacombe | Independent | Tracey Hargreaves | Mayor |
| Golden Point | Independent | Tess Morgan | |
| North | Independent | Jim Rinaldi | |
| Sebastopol | Labor | Des Hudson | |
| Wendouree | Independent | Jay Morrison | |

=== Administration and governance ===
The council meets in the council chambers at the council headquarters in the Ballarat Town Hall Offices, which is also the location of the council's administrative activities. It also provides customer services at both its administrative centre in Ballarat, and its service centre in Buninyong.

The council's main offices are in a modern extension behind the Town Hall called The Phoenix. In 2009 the council voted to move to a new headquarters at Civic Hall on Mair Street, which would turn the heritage listed Town Hall building into a public general purpose venue.

=== 2023 Council review ===
Prior to the 2024 election, The Victorian Electoral Commission conducted a review into the electoral structure of multiple Victorian councils, including the City of Ballarat. As part of this review it was deemed that from the 2024 election, the council would take up nine single-councillor wards, namely:

- Alfredton Ward
- Brown Hill Ward
- Buninyong Ward
- Central Ward
- Delacombe Ward
- Golden Point Ward
- North Ward
- Sebastopol Ward
- Wendouree Ward

== Election results ==
=== 2024 ===
2024 Victorian local elections: Ballarat
| Party | Votes | % | Swing | Seats | Change |
|---|---|---|---|---|---|
| Independents | 35,499 | 51.50 | +21.93 | 4 | ▲1 |
| Independent Liberal | 15,177 | 22.02 | −3.37 | 2 | ▼1 |
| Independent Labor | 9,955 | 14.44 | −10.67 | 3 | ▲1 |
| Greens | 8,294 | 12.03 | −4.91 | 0 | ▼1 |
| Formal votes | 68,925 | 97.10 | −0.87 | | |
| Informal votes | 2,057 | 2.90 | +0.87 | | |
| Total | 70,982 | 100.00 | | 9 | Steady |
| Registered voters / turnout | 86,108 | 82.43 | −0.18 | | |

=== 2020 ===
2020 Victorian local elections: Ballarat
| Party | Votes | % | Swing | Seats | Change |
|---|---|---|---|---|---|
| Independent | 20,266 | 29.57 | −17.82 | 3 | ▲1 |
| Independent Liberal | 17,403 | 25.39 | −1.92 | 3 | ▼1 |
| Labor | 17,213 | 25.11 | +11.62 | 2 | Steady |
| Greens | 11,614 | 16.94 | +4.13 | 1 | Steady |
| Australia First | 1,391 | 2.03 | +2.03 | 0 | Steady |
| Animal Justice | 659 | 0.96 | +0.96 | 0 | Steady |
| Formal votes | 68,546 | 97.97 | | | |
| Informal votes | 1,420 | 2.03 | | | |
| Total | 69,966 | 100.0 | | | |
| Registered voters / turnout | 84,694 | 82.61 | | | |

=== 2016 ===
2016 Victorian local elections: Ballarat
| Party | Votes | % | Seats | Change |
|---|---|---|---|---|
| Independent | 27,257 | 46.39 | 2 | ▲1 |
| Independent Liberal | 16,043 | 27.31 | 4 | ▲1 |
| Labor | 7,925 | 13.49 | 2 | Steady |
| Greens | 7,527 | 12.81 | 1 | Steady |
| Formal votes | 58,752 | 100.0 | | |

=== 2012 ===
2012 Victorian local elections: Ballarat
| Party | Votes | % | Swing | Seats | Change |
|---|---|---|---|---|---|
| Independents | 20,676 | 37.70 | | 2 | |
| Independent Liberal | 19,849 | 36.19 | | 5 | |
| Independent Labor | 9,829 | 17.92 | | 1 | |
| Greens | 4,489 | 8.19 | | 1 | |
| Formal votes | 54,843 | 97.30 | | | |
| Informal votes | 1,524 | 2.70 | | | |
| Total | 56,367 | 100 | | | |
| Registered voters / turnout | 72,725 | 77.51 | | | |

Central Ward

2012 Victorian local elections: Central Ward
| Party | Candidate | Votes | % | ±% |
|---|---|---|---|---|
| Independent Liberal | Samantha McIntosh | 4,355 | 26.10 | |
| Greens | Belinda Coates | 3,197 | 19.16 | |
| Independent Liberal | John Burt | 3,006 | 18.02 | |
| Independent | Mark Harris | 2,379 | 14.16 | |
| Independent | Glen Crompton | 1,337 | 8.01 | |
| Independent | Jenny Overington | 1,051 | 6.30 | |
| Independent | Matthew Freeman | 836 | 5.01 | |
| Independent | Gary Fitzgerald | 523 | 3.13 | |
| Turnout | | 17,163 | 75.22 | |

=== North ===
2012 Victorian local elections: North Ward
| Party | Candidate | Votes | % | ±% |
|---|---|---|---|---|
| Independent Liberal | Vicki Coltman | 4,963 | 28.38 | |
| Independent | John Philips | 4,046 | 21.02 | |
| Independent Liberal | Amy Johnson | 3,908 | 20.30 | |
| Labor | Daniel Moloney | 2,901 | 15.07 | |
| Labor | Scott Hebbard | 1,894 | 9.84 | |
| Independent | Allan Carter | 1,535 | 7.98 | |
| Turnout | | 19,735 | 79.57 | |

=== South ===
2012 Victorian local elections: South Ward
| Party | Candidate | Votes | % | ±% |
|---|---|---|---|---|
| Labor | Des Hudson | 5,034 | 26.62 | |
| Independent Liberal | Joshua Morris | 3,617 | 19.13 | |
| Independent | Peter Innes | 3,075 | 16.26 | |
| Independent | Jim Rinaldi | 2,930 | 15.49 | |
| Independent | Stephen Pelchen | 1,726 | 9.13 | |
| Greens | David Eldridge | 1,292 | 6.83 | |
| Independent | Sundram Sivamalai | 849 | 4.49 | |
| Independent | Matt Mattson | 889 | 4.80 | |
| Turnout | | 19,469 | 77.55 | |

== Townships and localities ==
The 2021 census, the city had a population of 113,763 up from 101,686 in the 2016 census

Population
| Locality | 2016 | 2021 |
|---|---|---|
| Addington | 71 | 65 |
| Alfredton | 9,220 | 11,822 |
| Ascot | 96 | 93 |
| Bakery Hill | 164 | 180 |
| Bald Hills^ | 107 | 114 |
| Ballarat Central | 5,328 | 5,378 |
| Ballarat East | 5,623 | 5,937 |
| Ballarat North | 3,925 | 4,041 |
| Black Hill | 2,126 | 2,124 |
| Blowhard | 84 | 82 |
| Bo Peep^ | 21 | 25 |
| Bonshaw | 210 | 949 |
| Brown Hill | 3,582 | 4,489 |
| Buninyong^ | 3,714 | 3,797 |
| Bunkers Hill | 261 | 270 |
| Burrumbeet^ | 232 | 249 |
| Canadian | 3,609 | 4,098 |
| Cardigan | 754 | 1,064 |
| Cardigan Village | 667 | 957 |
| Chapel Flat | 0 | 0 |
| Coghills Creek | 71 | 80 |
| Creswick^ | 3,170 | 3,279 |
| Delacombe | 6,297 | 5,408 |
| Durham Lead^ | 392 | 408 |
| Ercildoune^ | 70 | 90 |
| Eureka | 626 | 633 |
| Glen Park^ | 103 | 110 |
| Glendaruel | 52 | 49 |
| Glendonald | 11 | 12 |
| Golden Point | 2,107 | 2,217 |
| Gong Gong | 9 | 6 |
| Invermay | 835 | 900 |
| Invermay Park | 1,814 | 1,692 |
| Lake Gardens | 1,695 | 1,801 |
| Lake Wendouree | 2,882 | 2,878 |
| Learmonth | 438 | 396 |
| Lucas | 1,014 | 2,994 |
| Magpie | 371 | 368 |
| Miners Rest | 3,095 | 3,829 |
| Mitchell Park | 868 | 887 |
| Mount Bolton | 29 | 29 |
| Mount Clear | 3,390 | 3,671 |
| Mount Helen | 2,975 | 3,011 |
| Mount Pleasant | 2,203 | 2,225 |
| Mount Rowan | 294 | 295 |
| Nerrina | 962 | 970 |
| Newington | 1,900 | 1,844 |
| Redan | 2,889 | 3,000 |
| Scotchmans Lead | 97 | 105 |
| Scotsburn^ | 258 | 244 |
| Sebastopol | 10,032 | 10,194 |
| Smythes Creek^ | 1,467 | 1,762 |
| Soldiers Hill | 2,803 | 2,813 |
| Sulky^ | 232 | 234 |
| Tourello | 39 | 46 |
| Warrenheip^ | 669 | 721 |
| Wattle Flat^ | 97 | 104 |
| Waubra^ | 275 | 308 |
| Weatherboard | 51 | 52 |
| Wendouree | 10,445 | 10,376 |
| Windermere | 97 | 96 |
| Winter Valley | * | 3,440 |

^ – Territory divided with another LGA
* – Not noted in 2016 Census

== Sister cities ==
The City of Ballarat's sister cities are:

- Inagawa, Hyōgo, Japan
- Ainaro, East Timor

== See also ==
- List of localities in Victoria
- Ballarat
