= Scotsburn, Victoria =

Scotsburn
- Town
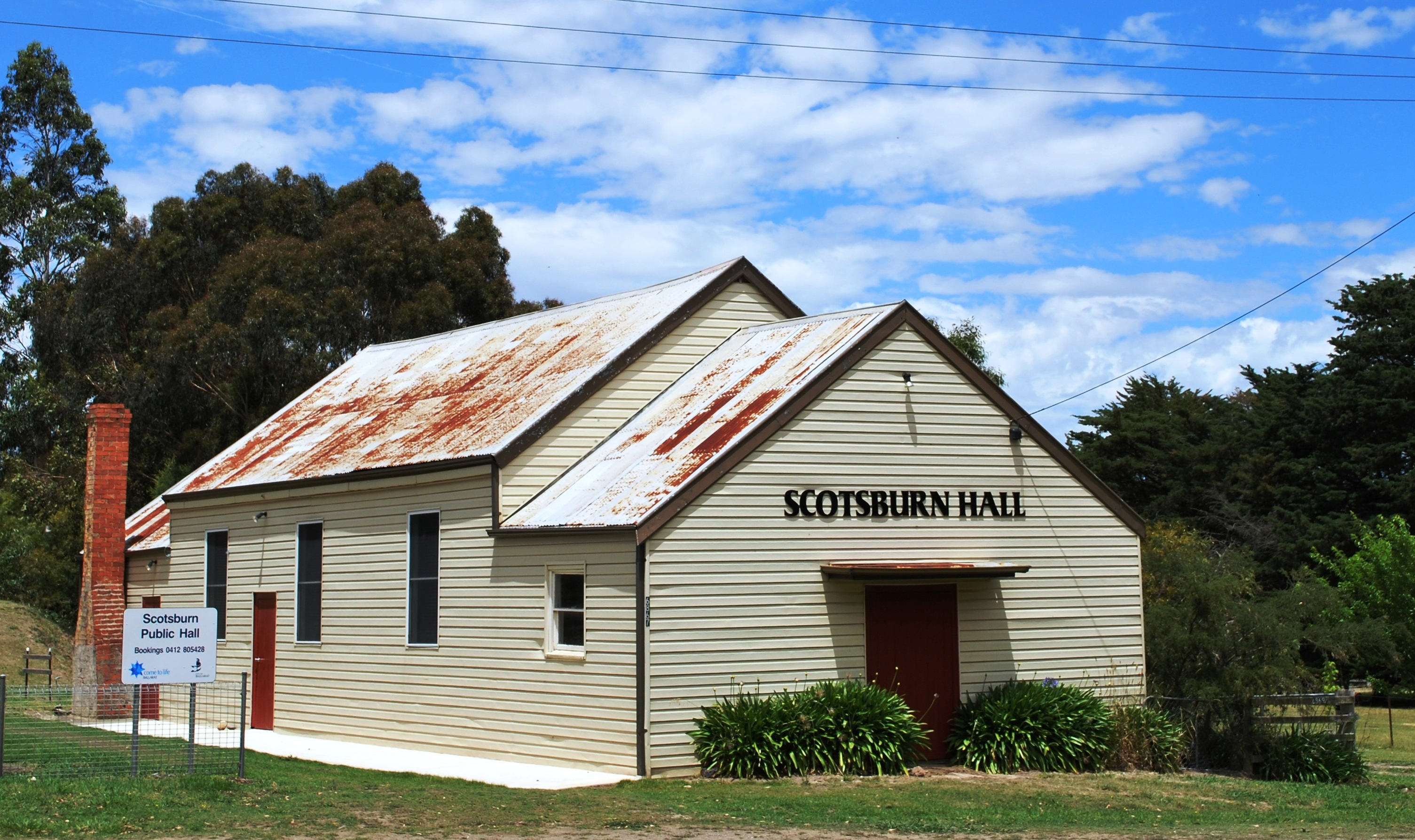
- Scotsburn Hall

- Coordinates: 37°41′08″S 143°56′20″E
- Country: Australia
- State: Victoria
- LGAs: Shire of Moorabool; City of Ballarat
- Location: 121 km (75 mi) from Melbourne; 69 km (43 mi) from Geelong; 16 km (9.9 mi) from Ballarat

Government
  - State electorate: Eureka
  - Federal division: Ballarat

Population
  - Total: 258 (2016 census)
- Postcode: 3352
Localities around Scotsburn
Buninyong	Buninyong	Yendon
Durham Lead	Scotsburn	Lal Lal
Durham Lead	Grenville	Elaine

Scotsburn is a locality in Victoria, Australia. It is approximately 16 kilometres (9.9 mi) from Ballarat on the Midland Highway toward Geelong. Its local government areas are the Shire of Moorabool and the City of Ballarat.

== History ==
Located at the foot of Mount Buninyong, it was named after the Scott family which settled in the area around 1840. Andrew and Celia Scott, who arrived in Australia in 1839, established a cattle farm of 16,000 acres (65 km^{2}).

After a period of growing potatoes in 1841-42 during poor financial times, in 1843 the Scott family began to run sheep. In addition to their original farm, the Scott family expanded their holdings by acquiring property in Victoria's western district and New South Wales, where some family members relocated to manage sheep stations. Over time, various sections of the original farm were sold to new farmers in the district.

In 1876, the first school was opened, known for a short time as Burnt Hill State School (State School number 2176). Four years later, the school was renamed Scotts Marsh and in 1889, it was again renamed, this time to Scotsburn. The school is now an annexe of Buninyong Primary School.

The post office opened on 9 August 1880 as Scott's Marsh, was renamed Scotsburn in 1889 and closed in 1971.

In 1884, the Scotsburn Union Church was formed, with an acre of land donated by Andrew Scott. The same church structure remains and still holds regular services.

In 1891, the Scotsburn Hall was built, funded by donations and land donated by the Eason family. Since its establishment, it has been utilised by the local primary school, the Scotsburn Tennis Club, and local residents for various functions.

== Recent history ==
A bushfire with an extent of 4600 hectares burned through Scotsburn and surrounding areas on 19 and 20 December 2015, killing livestock and pets and destroying at least twelve houses. Relief centres were set up for all evacuated people.
