= Chapel Flat =

- Suburb
- Interactive map of Chapel Flat
- Coordinates: 37.4780°S 143.8946°E
- Country: Australia
- State: Victoria
- City: Ballarat
- LGA: City of Ballarat

Government
  - State electorate: Ripon
  - Federal division: Ballarat

Population
  - Total: 0 (2021 census)
- Postcode: 3352
Suburbs around Chapel Flat
	Cabbage Tree
Sulky	Chapel Flat	Wattle Flat
	Invermay

Chapel Flat is a locality on the Eastern rural fringe of the City of Ballarat municipality in Victoria, Australia. At the 2021 census, Chapel Flat had no residents. The locality is almost entirely forested, containing the Creswick Plantation and part of the Creswick State Forest.
