= Tourello =

- Town
- Coordinates: 37.3534°S 143.7766°E
- Country: Australia
- State: Victoria
- LGA: City of Ballarat

Government
  - State electorate: Ripon
  - Federal division: Ballarat, Wannon

Population
  - Total: 46 (2021 census)
- Postcode: 3352
Localities around Tourello
	Clunes
Glendaruel	Tourello	Glendonald
	Coghills Creek

Tourello is a locality in western Victoria, Australia. At the 2021 census, Tourello and the surrounding area had a population of 46.

It was the location of the Sheepwash (later Tourello) school, conducted by Henry Judkins in the late 19th-century.

In November 1874, when the railway from Ballarat to Clunes was opened, a railway station was established at Tourello. The station was closed in 1956.

A post office was opened at Tourello in 1868 and was later moved to the railway station. A post office was re-established in Tourello in 1887 but was closed in 1895. The railway station post office was closed in 1950.
