= Thomas Hiscock =

Wooden bust of Thomas Hiscock

Thomas Hiscock (1812–1855) was an English blacksmith and prospector who settled in Australia in the 1840s. He is best-remembered today for helping to spark the Victorian Gold Rush with his discovery of gold outside the town of Buninyong, near Ballarat.

== Short biography ==
Hiscock was born in Berkshire, England, in 1812. He married Phoebe Blanchard in 1833 and the couple had two sons before moving to what is now Victoria on 1 July 1841. They had three more children, all daughters, after arriving in Australia (New South Wales).

He initially worked for a squatter in Trawalla before setting up as a blacksmith in Buninyong. He spent some time searching for gold around the Buninyong area, finally discovering an outcropping of gold-bearing reef in August 1851. This discovery led to increased interest in Victoria from gold prospectors, who soon uncovered gold at nearby Ballarat. In 1854 Hiscock was awarded £1000 for his part in the Victorian Gold Rush, but he was struck down by a cold contracted at the Mount Alexander diggings before he could receive it. He died on 25 July 1855

== Discovery ==
Accompanied by John Stoker Thomas, Hiscock discovered gold near the Buninyong cemetery in early August, 1851. The find was publicised by the Geelong Advertiser on 12 August 1851, which reported:

We yesterday received from Buninyong a packet containing some of the finest specimens of gold, in quartz matrix, that we have hitherto met with. They were found within a mile or two of the township by Mr Hiscock, a respectable resident there.

The discovery, which Hiscock later explained as occurring on 8 August 1851, led to an influx of prospectors into Buninyong. The reef was soon exhausted, but as prospectors began to search a greater area around Buninyong, they quickly discovered large gold deposits in and around the nearby settlement of Ballarat. Within a matter of weeks the goldfields administration shifted from Buninyong to Ballarat.

The ensuing gold rush did no favours for the Victorian economy in the short term, with many people leaving the major centres of Melbourne and Geelong in search of gold. However, the discovery of gold did halt the exodus of men from the newly established colony into neighbouring New South Wales, where gold had also been discovered earlier in the year.

== Memorial ==
Inscribed surface of the Hiscock obelisk

Following his death, an obelisk of granite was erected near the spot where Hiscock found gold. The obelisk proclaimed him to be the first discoverer of gold in Victoria; which although not strictly correct, may be argued to be an acceptable overstatement, considering the stimululation the discovery provided to Victoria during its early development era. The proclamation reads:

Erected by The Borough and Shire of Buninyong to indicate the spot where Gold was first discovered in Victoria by Mr. T. Hiscock(s) August 3rd 1851, David Kerr M.P. Mayor, Jas. A. Jordon Town Clerk, F.E.Sides J.P. President, C.A. Hale Secretary. June 21st 1897 Queen’s Diamond Jubilee Year.

Hiscock's obelisk can be found about eight kilometres (5.0 miles) south of Ballarat, on the Midland Highway at the corner of Hiscock Gully Road.

== See also ==
- Gold rush
- Edward Hargraves
- James Esmond
