= Weatherboard, Victoria =

Weatherboard Victoria
- Coordinates: 37.4422°S 143.6719°E
- Population: 52 (2021 census)
- Postcode(s): 3352
- LGA(s): City of Ballarat
- State electorate(s): Ripon
- Federal division(s): Ballarat, Wannon
Localities around Weatherboard:
	Addington
Ercildoune	Weatherboard	Learmonth
	Burrumbeet

Weatherboard is a locality in western Victoria, Australia. At the 2021 census, Weatherboard and the surrounding area had a population of 52.

Anecdotally, the location was so named because it was the first place in the region to have a home built using weatherboard rather than corrugated iron, stone or brick.
