= Eureka, Victoria =

Eureka
- Suburb
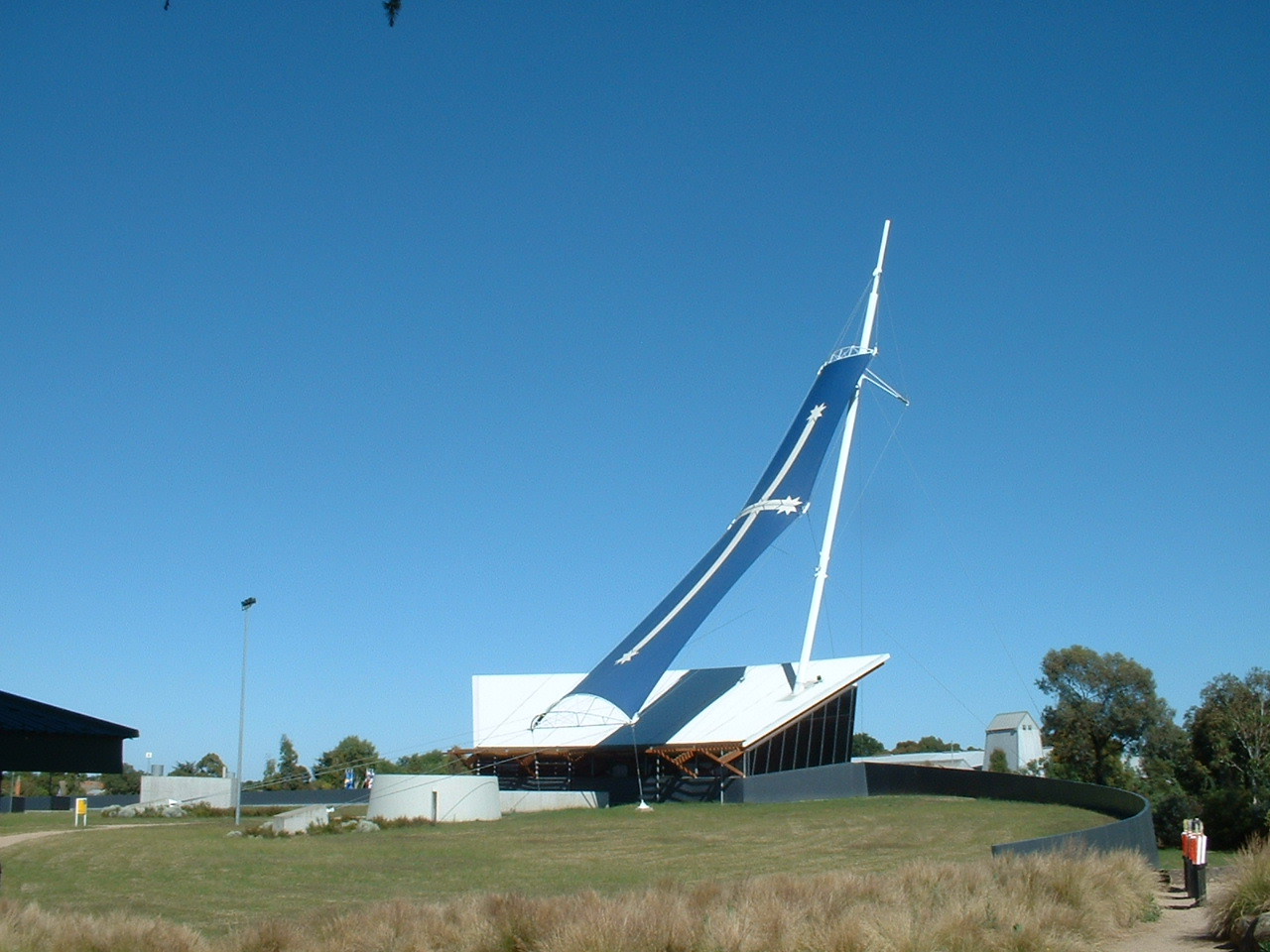
- The Eureka Stockade Centre in 2009

- Interactive map of Eureka
- Coordinates: 37.5648°S 143.8822°E
- Country: Australia
- State: Victoria
- City: Ballarat
- LGA: City of Ballarat
- Location: 1.5 km (0.93 mi) from Ballarat Central

Government
  - State electorate: Eureka
  - Federal division: Ballarat

Area
  - Total: 0.44 km^{2} (0.17 sq mi)

Population
  - Total: 633 (2021 census)
  - Density: 1,439/km^{2} (3,730/sq mi)
- Postcode: 3350
Suburbs around Eureka
Ballarat East	Ballarat East	Ballarat East
Ballarat East	Eureka	Ballarat East
Ballarat East	Ballarat East	Ballarat East

Eureka is a small eastern suburb of Ballarat, Victoria, Australia. It was originally part of Ballarat East but became its own suburb in 1946 in recognition of the area's significance to Australian history. Eureka is bordered by Specimen Creek to the north, Canadian Creek to the south, Queen and Joseph streets to the west and Kline and Stawell Street to the east. The suburb takes its name from the Eureka Lead – a lead is an ancient river bed that contains gold – of the Eureka Mining Company and is most notable as the site of the historic event of the Eureka Rebellion. This was the site where the rebel miners flew the Eureka Flag for the first time; a flag that has since become a symbol of the working class and trade union movement and, at times, Australian republicanism.

The Eureka Stockade Memorial Park – at the purported site of the Eureka Stockade – is the key site for the interpretation and commemoration of the events and legacy of the Eureka Rebellion. The park is built around the foundational 1889 Eureka Stockade Memorial. In 1998 the Eureka Stockade Centre was established at the Eureka Stockade Memorial Park to provide an interpretation of the Eureka story and site and present education programs. Following a second building redevelopment, a new museum called the Museum of Australian Democracy at Eureka (M.A.D.E) was opened in May 2013, this time presenting the original Eureka Flag, on loan from the Art Gallery of Ballarat. The City of Ballarat ended its arrangement with the independently operated MADE and it closed in March 2018. The building reopened to the public in April 2018, with the flag retained as the centrepiece of a visitor experience now branded as the Eureka Centre Ballarat.

At the 2021 census, Eureka had a population of 633.

== History ==
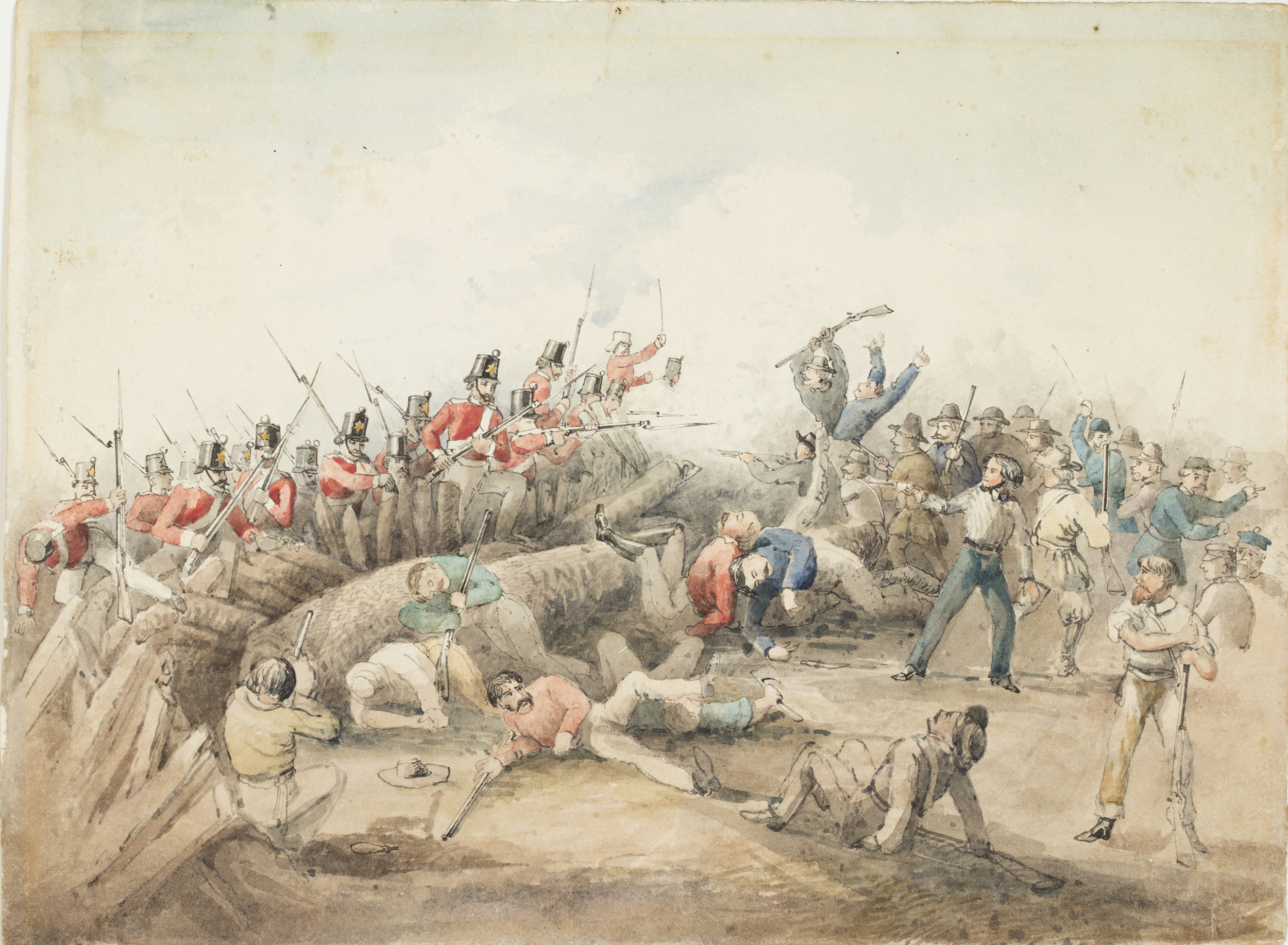
Battle of the Eureka Stockade. J. B. Henderson (1854) Watercolour

Civil disobedience in Eureka led to an armed civil uprising, the Eureka Rebellion (colloquially referred to as the Eureka Stockade) which took place on 3 December 1854. The event, in which 22 miners died, is considered to be a defining moment in Australian history.

For many years, Eureka was simply a locality in Ballarat East, however in 1946 it was officially gazetted as a suburb in its own right.

== Transport ==
Eureka does not have a main commercial area and is almost entirely residential. The Buninyong railway line bisects the suburb, however the line is disused and the station has been closed for nearly a century. Bus route number 15 (Ballarat Station - Brown Hill) currently services the Eureka community.

== Eureka Stockade memorials ==
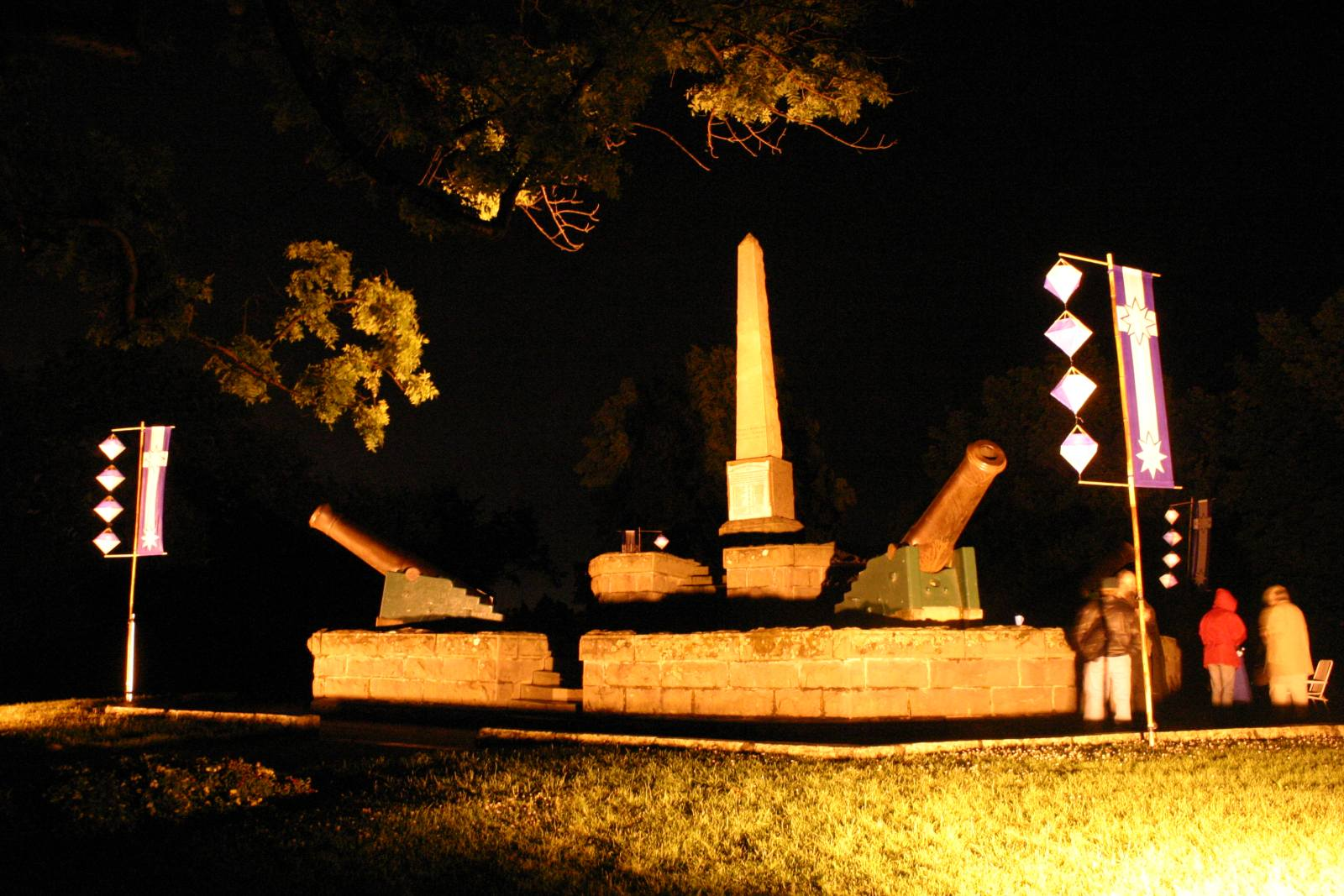
Pre dawn at the Eureka Monument, 3 December 2005

The Stockade gardens were set aside in 1864 to commemorate the Eureka Stockade event. The Eureka Stockade Monument was built in 1884 on a site selected by community vote. The monument itself is an obelisk on a plinth flanked by four cannons.

A Eureka Trail was devised which follows the movement of the soldiers from the barracks at Camp Street, Ballarat, across Black Hill to the battle site at Eureka.

A purpose-built interpretation centre for the Eureka Rebellion site was erected in 1998 near the site of the stockade. Designed to be a new landmark for Ballarat, the building featured an enormous sail emblazoned with the Eureka Flag. Before its development there was considerable debate over whether a replica or reconstruction of wooden stockade structures was appropriate, however it was eventually decided against and this is seen by many as a reason for the apparent failure of the centre to draw significant tourist numbers.

By 2006 falling visitor numbers had led to a business case being commissioned, and a re-imagining of the centre.

Grants from the City of Ballarat and the Victorian and Federal Governments led to the redevelopment of the site and the establishment of the Museum of Australian Democracy at Eureka (M.A.D.E.) in 2013. MADE closed in March 2018. In its place, the Eureka Centre Ballarat opened in April 2018 as a City of Ballarat owned and operated service.
