= Buninyong Town Hall =

Heritage listed building in Victoria, Australia

Coordinates: 37.6508°S 143.8847°E

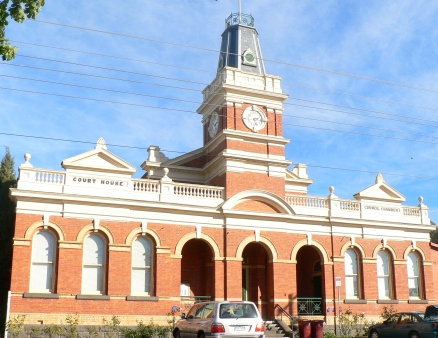
Buninyong Town Hall

Buninyong Town Hall is located in the centre of Buninyong, Victoria, Australia. Construction began on the combined town hall and courthouse on 30 August 1886. It is included on the Victorian Heritage Register for its architectural and historical importance to the State of Victoria.

The courthouse contains the Buninyong Historical Society collection, which includes historic items from the former Shire of Buninyong. The town hall is now used for a variety of purposes, such as the local Sunday market, discos, wedding receptions, debating, and arts exhibitions. The hall has been extended, with offices now making up the eastern side of the structure. This is owned by Tortor Plant Hire, and is accessible via an entrance to the left of the main hall entrance.

The hall boasts many features, including a large kitchen, stage, piano, and ample parking at the front and rear (accessible from Scott St).

Buninyong Town Hall is on the service road off Learmonth St, between the Buninyong Urban Fire Brigade and a cafe.
