= Invermay Park =

- Suburb
- Interactive map of Invermay Park
- Coordinates: 37.5306°S 143.8590°E
- Country: Australia
- State: Victoria
- City: Ballarat
- LGA: City of Ballarat

Government
  - State electorate: Wendouree
  - Federal division: Ballarat

Population
  - Total: 1,692 (2021 census)
- Postcode: 3350
Suburbs around Invermay Park
	Invermay
Wendouree	Invermay Park	Nerrina
	Ballarat North

Invermay Park is a suburb on the Northern rural fringe of the City of Ballarat municipality in Victoria, Australia. At the 2021 census, Invermay Park had a population of 1,692. Invermay Park contains the Ballarat General Cemetery.
