= Durham Lead =

Durham Lead Ballarat, Victoria
- Coordinates: 37.6975°S 143.8863°E
- Population: 408 (2021 census)
- Postcode(s): 3352
- LGA(s): City of Ballarat
- State electorate(s): Eureka
- Federal division(s): Ballarat
Suburbs around Durham Lead:
Scotchmans Lead	Buninyong
	Durham Lead	Scotsburn

Durham Lead is a locality on the southern rural fringe of the City of Ballarat municipality in Victoria, Australia. At the 2021 census, Durham Lead had a population of 408.
