= John Gunn (New South Wales politician) =

Australian politician

John Alexander Gunn (11 February 1860 – 21 September 1910) was an Australian pioneer scientist and politician.

He was born at Buninyong in Victoria to farmer Donald Gunn and Jane Surman. Donald migrated to Australia from Brawlbin, Caithness, Scotland in 1854 and married Jane Surman in 1859 at Buninyong. They had ten children - the oldest was John. He married Jessie Maria Turner, with whom he had four children.

Around 1878 John moved to New South Wales, becoming a pastoralist around Wagga Wagga. In October 1898 the Gunn family, Beatrice and Sydney Webb had lunch at Borombola, a farm on the Murrumbidgee near Wagga Wagga, managed (and later owned) by John. Beatrice Webb described him so - 'Our host proved to be an unusually interesting man. Australian born, of Scotch extraction, a successful manager of stations in various districts in New South Wales, he had devoted his leisure to a scientific investigation of Anthrax and had invented and patented a vaccine named after him - the Gunn vaccine ... He was delighted to show us over his laboratory and glad enough to find someone interested in his hobby. He was a thorough-going individualist, objecting altogether to Government regulation and the necessity of taking out a licence for his experimental work - a fine fellow for all that - hard working and upright, with that interesting combination of speculative intelligence and a keen commercial instinct ... For the rest he was a materialist in metaphysic, a reactionary in politics, and an autocrat in the home.'

John worked with John McGarvie Smith to improve his anthrax vaccination and was also involved in rabbit control. From 1906 to 1910 he served on Kyemba Shire Council, serving as president in 1906 and from 1909 to 1910. He was also a member of the New South Wales Legislative Council from 1908 until his death in Sydney in 1910.
