= Shire of Leigh =

Coordinates: 37°54′S 143°43′E

Shire of Leigh Victoria
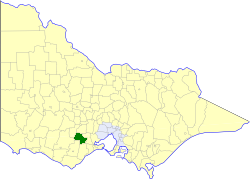
- Location in Victoria
- The Shire of Leigh as at its dissolution in 1994
- Population: 2,340 (1992)
  - Density: 2.383/km^{2} (6.172/sq mi)
- Established: 1861
- Area: 982 km^{2} (379.2 sq mi)
- Council seat: Rokewood
- Region: Grampians
- County: Grant, Grenville
LGAs around Shire of Leigh:
Grenville	Buninyong	Buninyong
Grenville	Shire of Leigh	Bannockburn
Hampden	Colac	Winchelsea

The Shire of Leigh was a local government area about 140 kilometres (87 mi) west of Melbourne, the state capital of Victoria, Australia. The shire covered an area of 982 square kilometres (379.2 sq mi), and existed from 1861 until 1994.

== History ==
Leigh Shire was first incorporated as the Shelford Road District in 1861, and was renamed Leigh at the time of its redesignation as a shire on 22 March 1864.

The Shire offices were in Rokewood, but Council meetings took place at an isolated hall at Warrambine Creek, halfway between the towns of Rokewood and Shelford.

On 6 May 1994, the Shire of Leigh was abolished, and along with the Shires of Bannockburn and Grenville, and parts of the Shire of Buninyong, was merged into the newly created Golden Plains Shire.

== Wards ==
The Shire of Leigh was divided into three ridings in May 1965, each of which elected three councillors:

- East Riding
- Middle Riding
- West Riding

== Towns and localities ==
- Corindhap
- Dereel
- Doroq
- Hesse
- Mount Mercer
- Rokewood*
- Shelford
- Teesdale
- Warrambeen
- Werneth
- Wingeel

* Council seat.

== Population ==
Year	Population
1954	1,096
1958	1,370*
1961	1,460
1966	1,403
1971	1,177
1976	1,184
1981	1,285
1986	1,791
1991	2,226

* Estimate in 1958 Victorian Year Book.
