= Mount Helen, Victoria =

Mount Helen
- Suburb
- Interactive map of Mount Helen
- Coordinates: 37.6276°S 143.8707°E
- Country: Australia
- State: Victoria
- City: Ballarat
- LGA: City of Ballarat
- Location: 6 km (3.7 mi) from Ballarat Central

Government
  - State electorate: Eureka
  - Federal division: Ballarat

Population
  - Total: 3,011 (2021 census)
- Postcode: 3350
Suburbs around Mount Helen
Mount Clear	Mount Clear	Navigators
Magpie	Mount Helen	Buninyong
Magpie	Buninyong	Buninyong

Mount Helen is a fast-growing southern suburb of Ballarat situated just north of the town of Buninyong in Victoria, Australia on the Canadian Creek. At the 2021 census, the population was 3,011.

Mount Helen, like nearby Mount Clear is characterised by its topography of gently undulating hills flanked by bush and pine plantation forestry. Canadian Creek, runs north to south through the suburb's centre.

The first house in Mount Helen was built in 1952.

Mount Helen is the headquarters of Federation University Australia and the Ballarat Technology Park, a campus style office park with tenants including IBM, and a number of state government offices including the State Revenue Office, collectively employing more than 1,400 people.

Mount Helen once had its own railway station on the Buninyong railway line but the station closed to passengers in 1930. Mount Helen is classed as automobile dependent and traffic along its main roads are some of the heaviest in urban Ballarat with over 15,000 vehicles per day and expected to increase by almost 50% over the next three decades. The main form of public transport is a bus service which runs along the Midland Highway between Bunninyong and northern Ballarat at a frequency of approximately 30 minutes.
