= Shire of Grenville =

Coordinates: 37°41′S 143°34′E

- Local government area
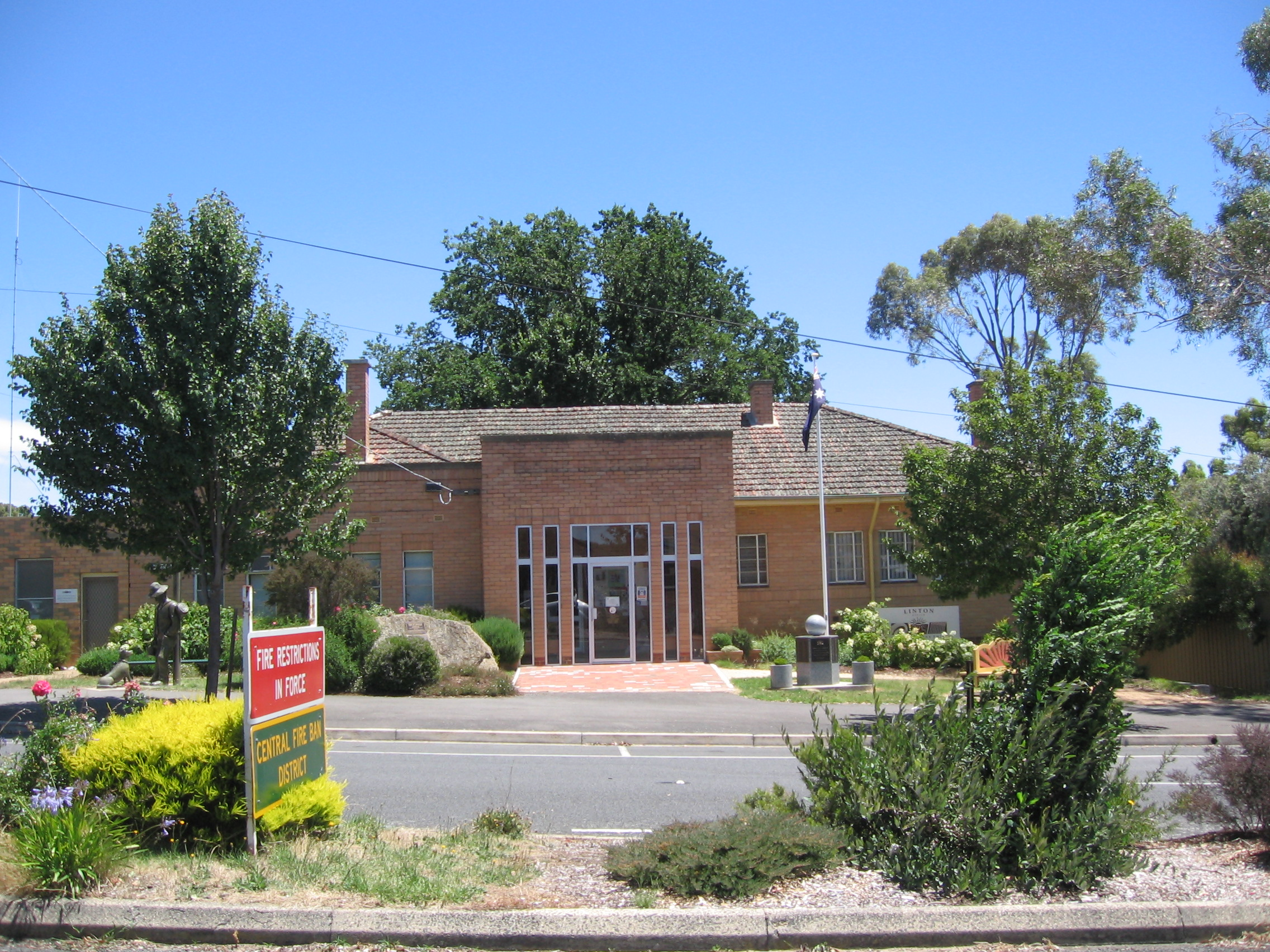
- Former Council offices at Linton

- The Shire of Grenville as at its dissolution in 1994
- Country: Australia
- State: Victoria
- Region: Grampians
- Established: 1861
- Council seat: Linton

Area
  - Total: 845 km^{2} (326 sq mi)

Population
  - Total(s): 8,580 (1992)
  - Density: 10.154/km^{2} (26.298/sq mi)
- County: Grenville
LGAs around Shire of Grenville
Ripon	Ballarat	Ballaarat
Hampden	Shire of Grenville	Buninyong
Hampden	Hampden	Leigh

The Shire of Grenville was a local government area southwest of the regional city of Ballarat, Victoria, Australia. The shire covered an area of 845 square kilometres (326.3 sq mi), and existed from 1861 until 1994.

== History ==
Grenville was first incorporated as a road district on 27 August 1861, and became a shire on 16 February 1864. On 1 October 1915, under the Local Government Amendment Act 1914, it absorbed the areas of two boroughs; Browns and Scarsdale, which was incorporated on 25 July 1862, with an area of 23.31 square kilometres (5,760 acres), and Smythesdale, incorporated on 12 April 1861, with an area of 5.83 square kilometres (1,441 acres).

On 6 May 1994, the Shire of Grenville was abolished, and along with the Shires of Bannockburn and Leigh and parts of the Shire of Buninyong, was merged into the newly created Golden Plains Shire.

== Wards ==
The Shire of Grenville was divided into four ridings on 16 May 1977, each of which elected three councillors:

- Delacombe Riding
- East Riding
- North Riding
- West Riding

== Towns and localities ==
- Bonshaw
- Cape Clear
- Delacombe
- Haddon
- Happy Valley
- Linton*
- Nintingbool
- Piggoreet
- Scarsdale
- Smythesdale
- Smythes Creek

* Council seat.

== Population ==
Year	Population
1954	1,862
1958	1,910*
1961	1,833
1966	1,692
1971	1,802
1976	2,790
1981	4,293
1986	6,395
1991	8,113

* Estimate in 1958 Victorian Year Book.

== Gallery ==
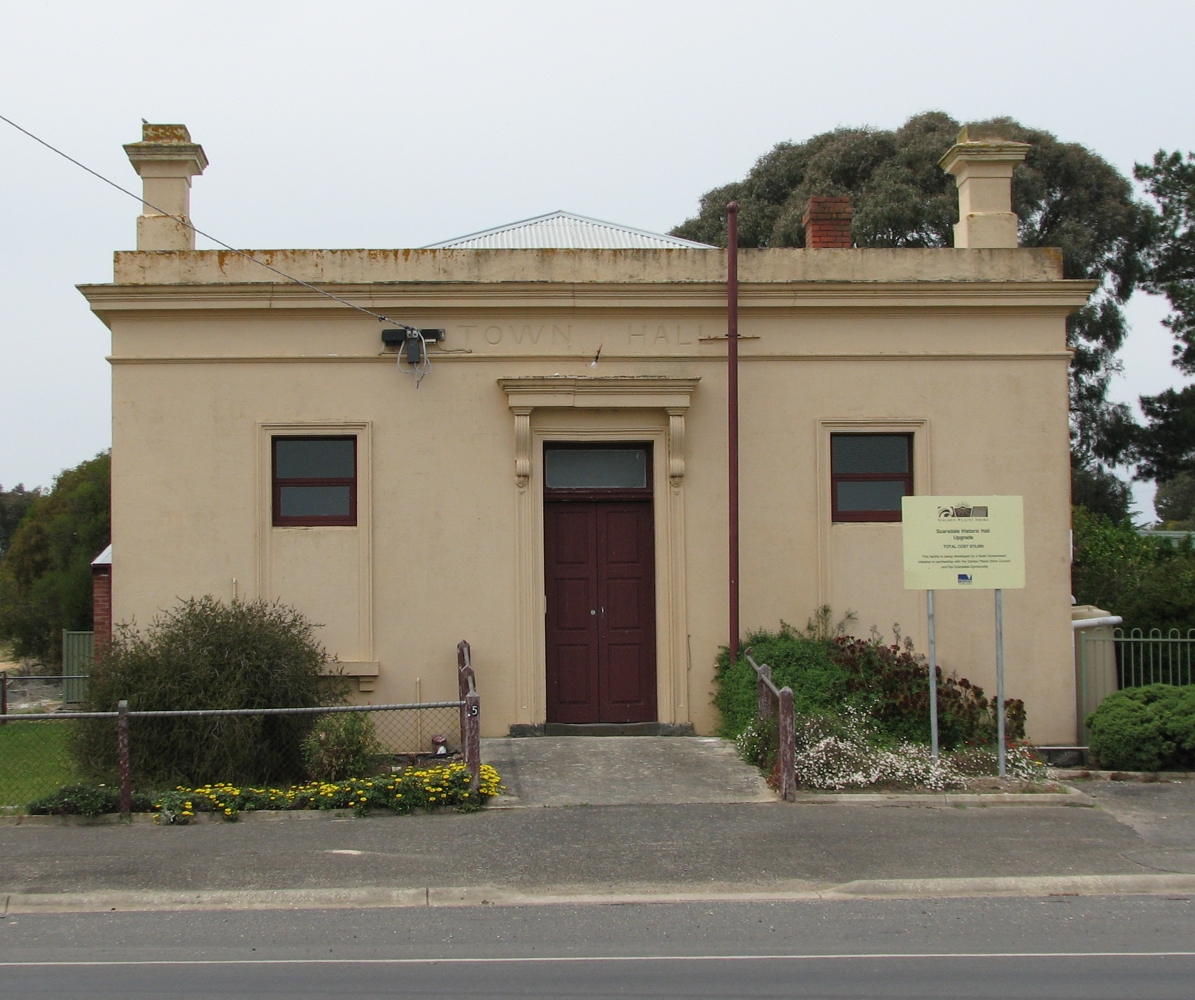
Former Town Hall of the Borough of Browns and Scarsdale, at Scarsdale
