= Mount Rowan, Victoria =

Mount Rowan
- Town
- Coordinates: 37.5029°S 143.8400°E
- Country: Australia
- State: Victoria
- LGA: City of Ballarat

Government
  - State electorate: Ripon
  - Federal division: Ballarat, Wannon

Population
  - Total: 295 (2021 census)
- Postcode: 3352
Localities around Mount Rowan
	Sulky
Miners Rest	Mount Rowan	Invermay
	Wendouree

Mount Rowan is a locality in western Victoria, Australia. At the 2021 census, Mount Rowan and the surrounding area had a population of 295.

== Notable person ==
- Jim Hovey (1922–95), Australian rules footballer (Geelong Football Club)
