= Bald Hills, Victoria =

Coordinates: 37.442°S 143.835°E

Bald Hills Victoria
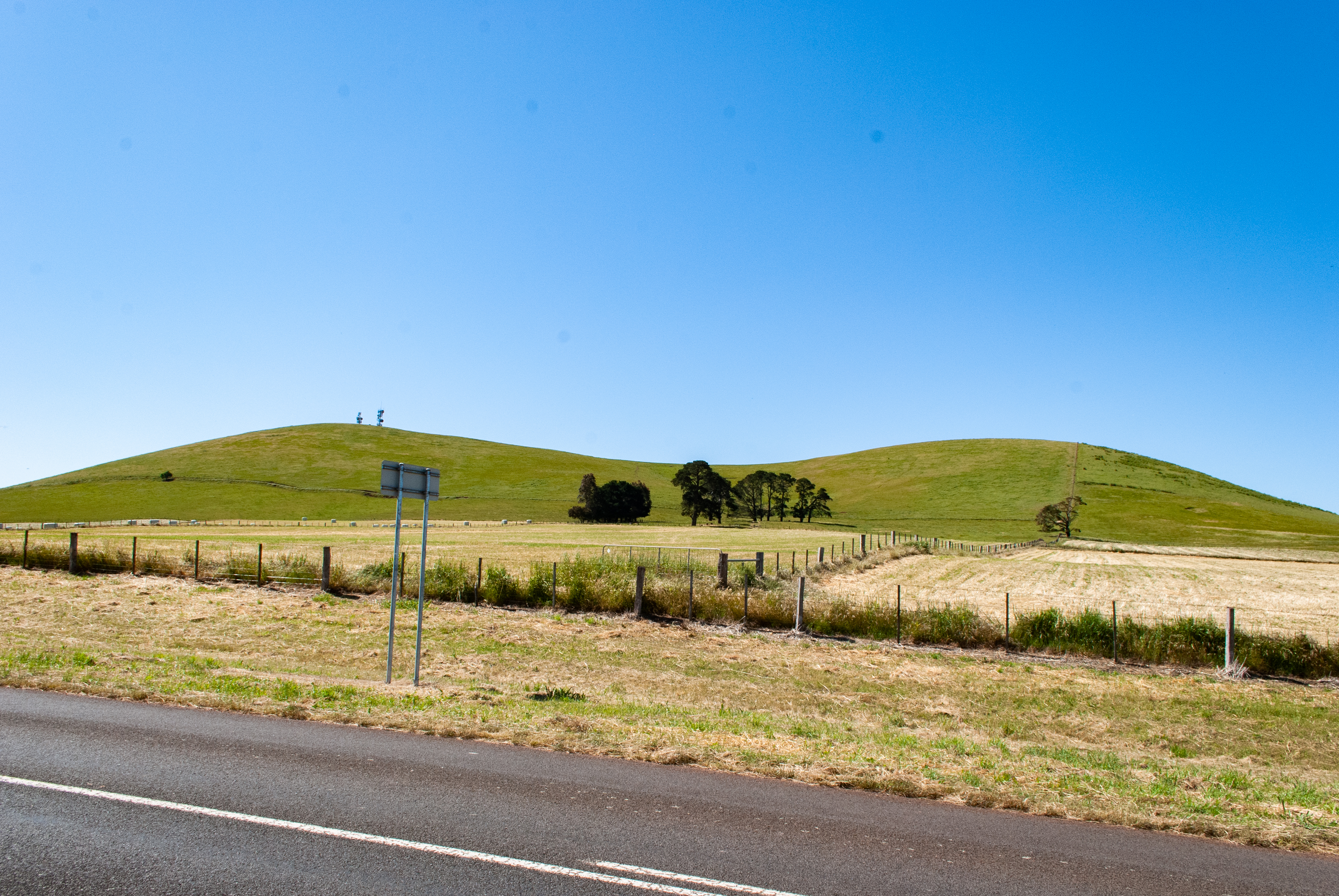
- The two Bald Hills

- Population: 107 (2016 census)
- Postcode(s): 3364
- Location: 107 km (66 mi) WNW of Melbourne; 14 km (9 mi) N of Ballarat; 3 km (2 mi) W of Creswick
- LGA(s): City of Ballarat; Shire of Hepburn
- State electorate(s): Ripon
- Federal division(s): Ballarat

Bald Hills is a locality in central Victoria, Australia, in the City of Ballarat and Hepburn Shire local government areas, 107 kilometres (66 mi) west of the state capital, Melbourne, and 14 kilometres (8.7 mi) north of Ballarat. The area is about 442 metres (1,450 ft) above sea level.

The area is dominated by large volcanic hills, including Mount Blowhard, Mount Pisgah, Mount Hollowback and Mount Cavern. These hills gave the area its name:

These rounded mound-like hills are thickly dotted over the surface, at times there being fully a score of them in view at once. They are almost bare of trees, and have been named by the bushmen "bald hills."

Balds Hills also at one time had a railway station on the still operating Ballarat - Creswick - Maryborough line (station now closed and no evidence exists) and several hotels (all closed).

== Gold mining ==
The area was the site of several gold mines between 1860 and 1900, and there is still evidence of this mining activity. Some of the larger mines included the Ascot Extended Mines, the Dowling Forest No. 1 Mine and the Midas No. 1 Mine. The Ballarat Star newspaper reported on the early days during a later gold-mining revival by the Bald Hills Quartz and Alluvial Company in 1880:

MINING REVIVAL AT BALD HILLS. The locality known as the Bald Hills is situated about seven miles north of Ballarat. For many years past there has been very little mining carried on there, a period of comparative quietude having succeeded the good old days when the Bald Hills Lead and its three tributaries, namely, the Havilah, the Princess, and the Red Streak, were yielding their rich stores to the miners. Then a group of companies, comprising the Prospectus, the Homeward Bound, the Sons of Justice, the Young Sons of Justice, the Morning Star, the Garibaldi, the Alliance, and several other companies, were all busily engaged in unearthing the precious metal.

The Dowling Forest Mining Company reported to its shareholders in January 1885:

The Dowling Forest Estate comprises an area of 5680 acres, into which the celebrated Bald Hills and Sulky Gully leads have been traced with payable results. The No. 1 has also given reliable evidence of good ground existing in the vicinity. ... The gold has already been found on the No. 1, and a little improvement will make it payable.
