= Mitchell Park, Victoria =

Mitchell Park Ballarat, Victoria
- Coordinates: 37.5089°S 143.7748°E
- Population: 887 (2021 census)
- Postcode(s): 3355
- LGA(s): City of Ballarat
- State electorate(s): Ripon
- Federal division(s): Ballarat
Suburbs around Mitchell Park:
	Miners Rest
Burrumbeet	Mitchell Park	Wendouree
	Cardigan

Mitchell Park is a suburb on the north-western rural-urban fringe of Ballarat in Victoria, Australia. At the 2021 census, Mitchell Park had a population of 887. Mitchell Park contains the Ballarat Airport.
