= Scotchmans Lead =

- Town
- Coordinates: 37°40′S 143°51′E
- Country: Australia
- State: Victoria
- LGA: City of Ballarat

Government
  - State electorate: Eureka
  - Federal division: Ballarat

Population
  - Total: 105 (2021 census)
- Postcode: 3352

Scotchmans Lead, a rural locality 6 km (3.7 statute miles) from Buninyong, in South Western Victoria, Australia, sits between the Yarrowee River, Midland Highway and Scotchmans Lead Road. It has recently been renamed Scotchmans Lead from Yarrowee, after a proposal by the Ballarat City Council to change its name back to the name of its historic days.

Scotchmans Lead was once a prominent mining area and farming area, with many properties still rearing animals such as cows and horses. The former Scotchmans Lead school, itself originally a church, has recently been turned into a bed-and-breakfast.

Scotchman's Lead Post Office opened on 17 January 1865, was renamed Yarrowee in 1875, and closed in 1961.
