= Invermay, Victoria =

Invermay Ballarat, Victoria
- Coordinates: 37.5024°S 143.8781°E
- Population: 900 (2021 census)
- Postcode(s): 3350
- LGA(s): City of Ballarat
- State electorate(s): Ripon
- Federal division(s): Ballarat
Suburbs around Invermay:
	Chapel Flat
Mount Rowan	Invermay	Pootilla
	Nerrina

Invermay is a locality on the Northern rural fringe of the City of Ballarat municipality in Victoria, Australia. At the 2021 census, Invermay had a population of 900.
