= Mount Buninyong =

Mountain in Victoria, Australia

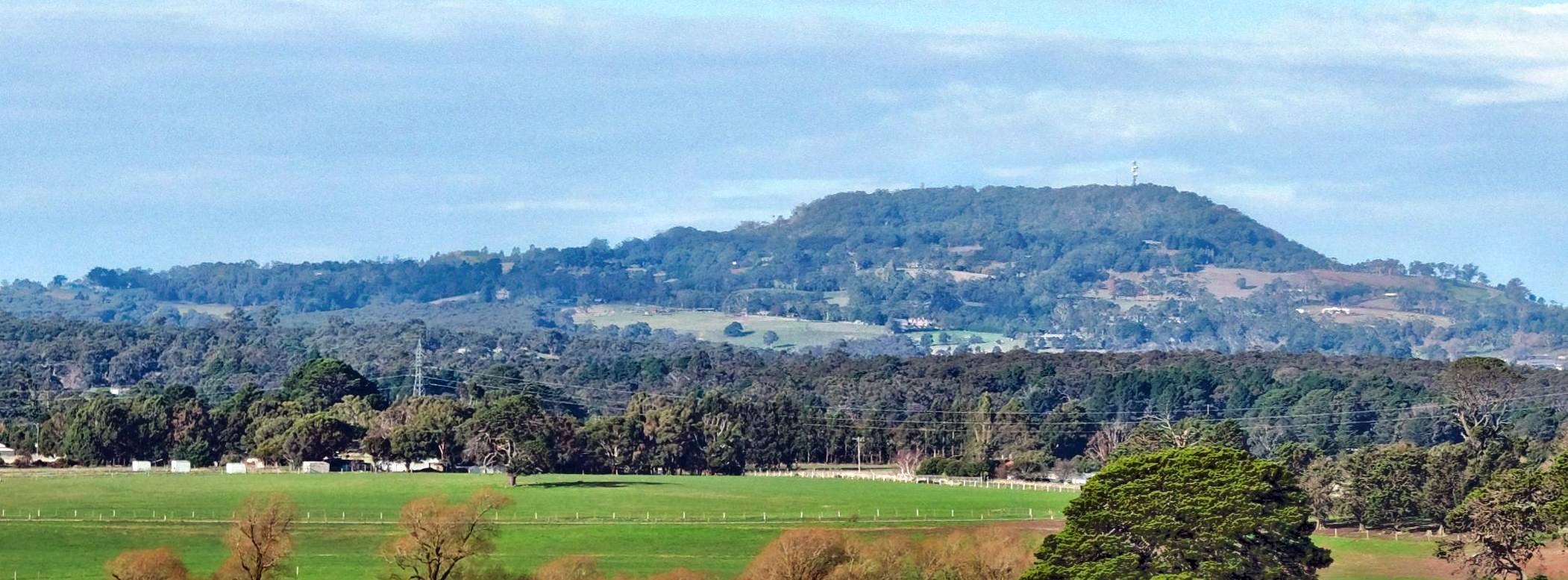
- Mount Buninyong viewed from Cambrian Hill

Highest point
- Elevation: 745 metres (2,444 ft) AHD
- Listing: List of volcanoes in Australia
- Coordinates: 37°39′S 143°56′E

Geography
- Location within Victoria
- Location: Buninyong, Victoria, Australia

Climbing
- First ascent: BCE

Mount Buninyong /ˈbʌnɪnjɒŋ/ is an extinct volcano in western Victoria, Australia rising to 745 metres (2,444 ft) AHD. It lies within the Mount Buninyong Scenic Reserve, 4 kilometres (2.5 mi) north of the town of Buninyong and 14 kilometres (8.7 mi) south of Ballarat, on the regional city's rural-urban fringe.

Snow falls on Mt. Buninyong on average 6 days a year, and in heavy winters it may be snowcapped for a short period.

== Location and features ==
The mountain was originally named Mount Bonan Yowing, which is said to derive from an Aboriginal word meaning 'a man lying on his back with his knee raised'. It was from its peak that Thomas Learmonth and a group of squatters first viewed in 1837 what would become the Ballarat district. It is one of the more recognizable landmarks in the entire Goldfields region.

Mount Buninyong is located on crown land. Much of it is a public reserve with a substantial native forest that is a major koala habitat. It is an important piece of regional infrastructure as a site for multiple communications antenna for radio and television broadcasting. It is home to picnic areas and the observation tower at its summit is a local tourist destination.

Much of the mountain was cleared for agriculture or housing, but widespread protests during the 1980s led to the preservation of native forest cover on much of the upper portion.

Total annual rainfall for the Mount Buninyong area is 779 millimetres (30.7 in). During the colder months growing conditions are restricted. Severe frosts and snow fall occur during winter.

The soils of the mount are very fertile and the high permeability and available water capacity makes these soils very favourable for agriculture.

== Heritage ==
The Keyeet balug clan of the Wada Wurrung (or Wathaurong) tribe occupied the Mount Buninyong area. An aboriginal burial site was located in the 1860s and more recently stone tools have been found. Mount Buninyong is seen as a significant site for the recognition of the ongoing connection of Aboriginal people with the land through creation stories and cultural sites and is an ideal site for interpreting Aboriginal cultural history. There have been no records of Aboriginal archaeological sites for Mount Buninyong. There is no evidence that the area has been surveyed. Aboriginal Affairs Victoria has recommended that a survey should take place.

Mount Buninyong was an important navigation peak for the early colonisers heading west for pastoral occupation. Springs at the base of the mount were important sites for early settlement. Pound Creek Spring has remained as a public Water Reserve.

== See also ==
- List of mountains in Australia § Victoria
