= Golden Point, Victoria =

Golden Point Ballarat, Victoria
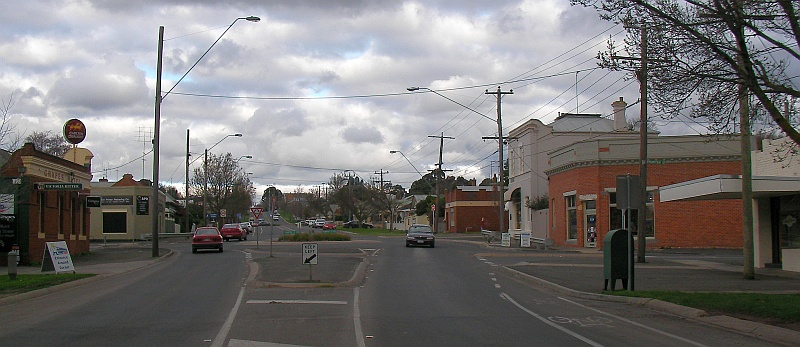
- Grant Street, main street of Golden Point at the junction of Hummfray and Bond Streets looking north; Grapes Hotel is on the left

- Coordinates: 37.574°S 143.868°E
- Population: 2,217 (2021 census)
  - Density: 1,192/km^{2} (3,087/sq mi)
- Postcode(s): 3350
- Area: 1.86 km^{2} (0.7 sq mi)
- Location: 1.5 km (1 mi) from Ballarat Central
- LGA(s): City of Ballarat
- State electorate(s): Eureka
- Federal division(s): Ballarat
Suburbs around Golden Point:
Ballarat Central	Ballarat Central	Bakery Hill
Ballarat Central	Golden Point	Ballarat East, Canadian
Redan	Mount Pleasant, Canadian	Canadian

Golden Point is a suburb of Ballarat, Victoria, Australia located south-east of the CBD. It is the oldest settlement in Greater Ballarat. Gold was discovered at Poverty Point on 21 August 1851 by John Dunlop and James Regan, sparking the Ballarat gold rush. Golden Point was the site of what was known as the Ballarat diggings, and for at least a decade the focal point of the original Ballarat township was Main Street. At the 2021 census, Golden Point had a population of 2,217.

Golden Point is bordered by the Yarrowee River to the west, Steinfield, Eureka and Callow Streets to the north, Larter Street to the east and Gladstone, Magpie and Elsworth Streets to the south. The topography varies, from the floodplain of Specimen Vale from Golden Point Hill (after which the suburb was named).

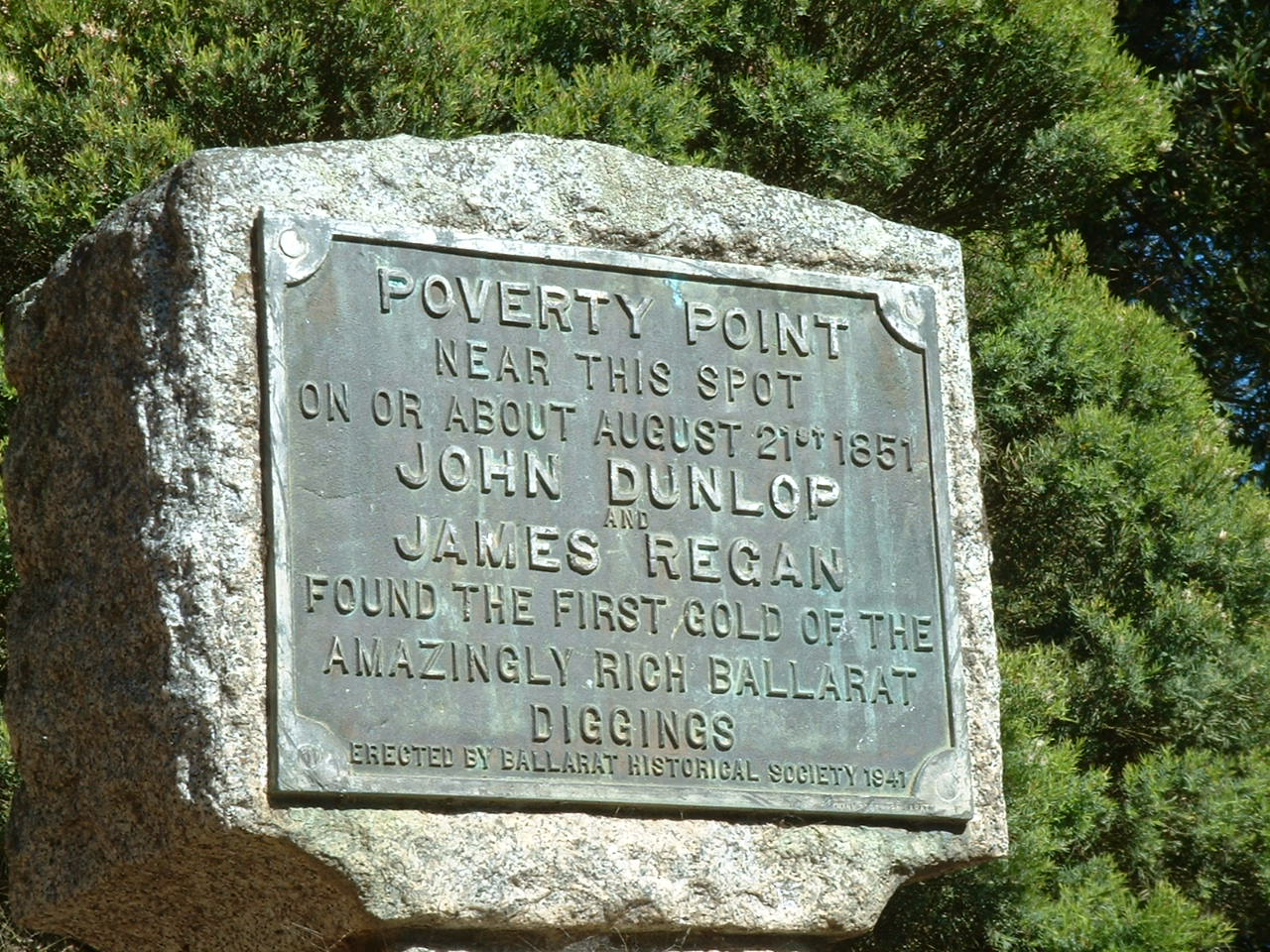
Poverty Point gold discovery marker

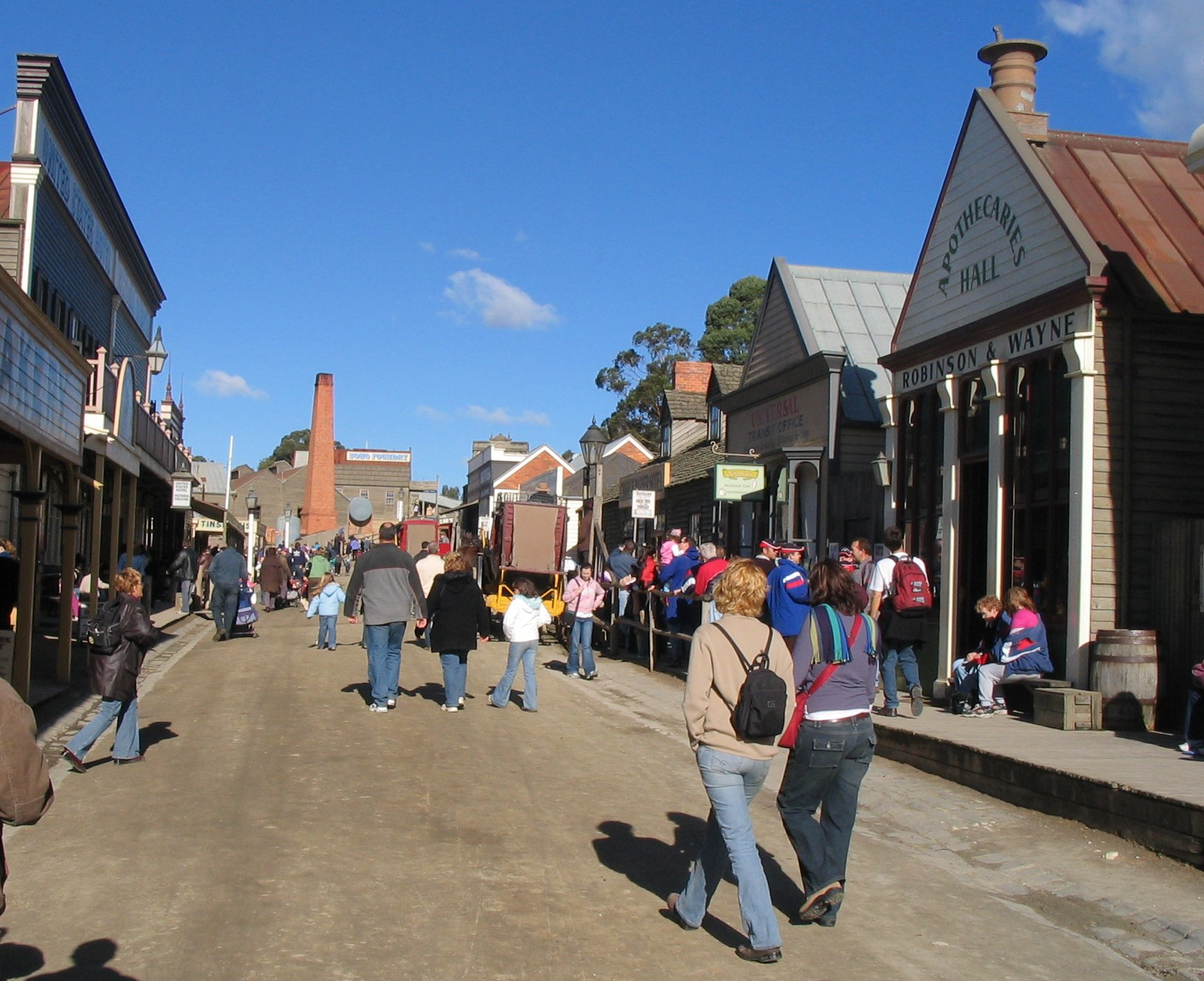
Sovereign Hill Historical Park

Golden Point is notable as the location (atop Golden Point Hill) of the Sovereign Hill Historic Park, which depicts the area around Main Street; the Observation lookout from which the Ballarat skyline can be viewed and the Ballarat Gold Museum.

== History ==
The area was once known as Poverty Point. However, on 21 August 1851 prospectors John Dunlop and James Regan struck a few ounces of gold when passing through the area; the announcement of this discovery is attributed to sparking the Ballarat Gold Rush, hence the poetic name change. A historical marker for the location of the discovery is located in a reserve just off Clayton Street.

With the establishment of the township of Ballarat West, Main Street went into steep decline in the 1860s and 1870s before being almost completely decimated by a disastrous fire.

In 1970, Sovereign Hill Historic Park was constructed, with the aim of recreating the original Golden Point settlement, although set on the hill rather than the original valley, it features many of the early timber buildings which once lined the Main Street, Golden Point in the 1850s, along with many aspects of life and industry from that era.

== Economy and Tourism Industry ==
Golden Point has a number of restaurants, including Italian, Chinese and Indian cuisines, as well as accommodation, convention and function venues which capitalise on the proximity of Sovereign Hill.
