= Magpie, Victoria =

Magpie Ballarat, Victoria
- Coordinates: 37.632°S 143.832°E
- Population: 368 (2021 census)
- Established: c.1855
- Postcode(s): 3352
- Location: 6 km (4 mi) from Ballarat Central
- LGA(s): City of Ballarat
- State electorate(s): Ripon
- Federal division(s): Ballarat
Suburbs around Magpie:
Bonshaw	Mount Clear
Magpie	Mount Helen
Scotchmans Lead	Buninyong

Magpie is a town in the City of Ballarat, Victoria, Australia. During the 1850s, gold was found at Frenchmans Lead, which essentially created the township.

The population at the 2021 census was 368.

The town is home to Magpie Primary School. A small school, it attracts fewer than 100 students.
