= Sulky, Victoria =

Sulky Ballarat, Victoria
- Coordinates: 37.4603°S 143.8509°E
- Population: 234 (2021 census)
- Postcode(s): 3352
- LGA(s): City of Ballarat
- State electorate(s): Ripon
- Federal division(s): Ballarat
Suburbs around Sulky:
| | Creswick |
| Miners Rest | Sulky | Chapel Flat |
| | Mount Rowan |

Sulky is a locality on the Eastern rural fringe of the City of Ballarat municipality in Victoria, Australia. At the 2021 census, Sulky had a population of 234.
