= Mount Clear, Victoria =

Mount Clear
- Suburb
- Interactive map of Mount Clear
- Coordinates: 37.602°S 143.868°E
- Country: Australia
- State: Victoria
- City: Ballarat
- LGA: City of Ballarat
- Location: 6 km (3.7 mi) from Ballarat Central

Government
  - State electorate: Eureka
  - Federal division: Ballarat

Population
  - Total: 3,671 (2021 census)
- Postcode: 3350
Suburbs around Mount Clear
Mount Pleasant	Canadian	Canadian
Mount Pleasant, Magpie	Mount Clear	Mount Helen
Magpie	Mount Helen	Mount Helen

Mount Clear is a semi-rural suburb of Ballarat, Victoria, Australia south of the CBD in the Canadian Creek Valley. At the 2021 census, Mount Clear had a population of 3,671.

Mount Clear is characterised by hilly topography flanked by bush and pine plantation forestry. The location, at the southern end of the White Horse Ranges, comprises a series of gentle hills running south from Golden Point immediately adjacent Ballarat City. This topography rises to the south west corner of Mount Clear and it is probably this feature that lead to the Mount terminology. There is no identified Mount Clear mountain or hill. Victorian Places speculates that the Clear part of the name was a result of its relatively elevated location being cleared of timber during or soon after the gold rushes.

The Whitehorse ranges separate the Canadian and Yarrowee Creeks. The beds of both creeks yielded massive gold finds, most prominently in the 19th Century. Mount Clear is on the southern periphery of these historic goldfields and has gold prospecting history.

Canadian Creek, on the suburb's eastern border, flows north towards the Ballarat CBD, where it joins the Yarrowee Creek.

History

Mount Clear began as a small mining community. The Whitehorse ranges are rich in quartz reefs which were mined southward from Ballarat from about 1857 as far as Mount Clear. In 1858 the first school was established in the south east corner of the current Mount Clear Primary School site, in a building owned by the Union Church. In the 1860s there was a Chinese camp at Mount Clear near the Pyrities Works Hill on the east side of the Yarrawee creek near where Whitehorse Road now runs. These camps included a joss house, Chinese stores and gambling and opium dens. It is unclear if the term Mount Clear was in use this early. There remain some brick structures from substantial mine infrastructure on the south side of Whitehorse Road, just west of its crest. This is believed to be winding engine foundations from the British Queen mine. The Woah Haup No. 1 mine is also referenced apparently at this location which would fit with the Chinese heritage. Either way, this is one of the few above ground mining era relics remaining in Mount Clear.

In 1863 the first permanent school building was established about where the eastern end of the main school building is today. That schoolhouse was to serve, with improvements until 1967.

When the Buninyong Shire was formed in 1864 it met in rented premises at Mount Clear. In 1865 Bailliere's Victorian gazetteer described Mount Clear as a gold mining postal township with a population of about 300 served by cabs from Ballarat. There was a Church of England, a Disciples of Christ's meeting-house, a State school and a Shire Hall in the vicinity.

Shire offices were built at Mount Clear in 1869. A post office was established before 1895 (citation required). The 1871 census records a population of 429.

Prior to 1875 the Halfway Hotel was established, on the east side of Geelong Road, about where Recreaction Road now terminates.

In 1889 the branch Buninyong railway line line was opened running from the Ballarat East Station to Buninyong with numerous small stations and sidings. One of these was Mount Clear and until recently extensive remains of the earthen platform could still be discerned on private property immediately west of Olympic Avenue. Some have now been subsumed by the Earth Centre building of Mount Clear College. Immediately south of the station the line crossed a little unnamed creek that runs west into the Canadian Creek on a timber bridge. Some remnants of the bridge remain.

At its peak, the Mount Clear Station had a throughput of over 3000 passenger per annum. Initially it comprised a loop, goods yard, platform, timber shelter with office cubicles and signals. The goods shed was removed in 1894 as a result of limited use and the loop was closed in 1913. Passenger services ceased in 1930 but freight services continued to most of the above stations until about 1947.

The 1903 Australian Handbook described Mount Clear as an agricultural and mining district having a money-order office, telegraph station, shire hall, two hotels and stores but a population of only 100.

Mount Clear's municipal role ended in 1915 when The Shire was united with Buninyong Borough and moved to The Borough's offices in Buninyong. The 1933 Census records a population of 229.

Primary road access from Ballarat was via Main Road or Whitehorse Road via Sebastopol. The Whitehorse Road route crossed the Yarrowee Creek on a modest single lane bridge. This was swept away by floodwaters in 1934 cutting off this route to motor vehicles. A new bridge of steel trestles with a concrete deck was installed in less than two months in early 1935 and superseded in the late 1960s with a two lane reinforced concrete bridge which remains in service today.

As late as the Second World War years, Mount Clear was without an electricity supply. In late 1951 the State School was connected to the public electricity supply. The town water supply went no further south than the Mount Clear Post Office until well into the 1950s.

By the 1950s urban fringe residential settlement was slowly gathering momentum despite the lack of public services. The few telephones were routed through the post office and the service ceased at night. The first dedicated residential sub-divisions, as opposed to individual or bespoke blocks progressed in the 1950s. These initially consisted of ribbon developments accessed via service roads parallel to Geelong Road. The first subdivision with dedicated road access was that between Dallas and Heather Avenues around 1960 (citation required). The 1966 Census records a population of 711. Enrolments at the Mount Clear school passed 100 in 1965 and in 1970 a new classroom wing replaced the previous permanent building after over 100 years.

In 1967 the Catholic Church opened an ambitious new senior girls boarding school, St Martins in the Pines and an estate willed to them on the west side of Geelong Road between Jones Avenue and Leckie Grove. The site has been advanced and diversified since as Damascus College Ballarat.

Services were gradually evolving. The public gas supply stopped at Olympic Avenue, at late as the 1970s. There was a public gas lamp in place at the Geelong Road and Olympic Avenue intersection on the east side. This was lit manually at dusk every night. Sewer services progressed through the 1970s and 1980s eventually reaching most streets.

Until the 1980s the commercial centre of Mount Clear was the Post Office and General Store on a service road off Geelong Road adjacent the corner of Jones Avenue. A commercial precinct was allocated between Dallas and Lylia Avenues in the 1960s but development stopped at one building which served as a butcher and fish and chip shop for a few years at the end of the 1960s and early 1970s. That building remains as part of the Mount Clear Community Kindergarten. In the early 1990s (citation required) the Midvale Shopping Centre was developed at the corner of Geelong and Whitehorse Roads and the old Post Office and general store closed. Its site has since been re-developed.

The population continued to grow, 2344 by the 2006 census and 2905 by 2011 .

Mount Clear expanded rapidly in the latter 20th Century to become part of the Ballarat urban area and much subdivision activity continues.

Recent History & Description

The suburb is organised on a street hierarchy with the main roads through it being Geelong Road (north-south) and Whitehorse Road (east-west). Housing consists almost solely of single-family detached homes constructed since the 1970s on larger than average blocks. There is a small commercial area on the corner of Geelong and Whitehorse Road.

Mount Clear is classed as automobile dependent and traffic along its main roads are some of the heaviest in urban Ballarat with over 15,000 vehicles per day passing through Mount Clear and expected to increase by almost 50% over the next three decades. The main form of public transport is a choice of 2 bus routes that run along either Geelong Road and Main Road, or Geelong Road and Whitehorse Road between Buninyong and the Ballarat terminus at a frequency of approximately 30 minutes.

The suburb has several educational institutions catering for all age levels, including two high schools, Mount Clear College and Damascus College, two primary schools, Mount Clear Primary School and Emmaus Catholic Primary School, and a community kindergarten.
