= Blowhard, Victoria =

Blowhard Victoria
- Coordinates: 37.429°S 143.785°E
- Population: 82 (2021 census)
- Postcode(s): 3352
- LGA(s): City of Ballarat
- State electorate(s): Wendouree
- Federal division(s): Ballarat

Blowhard, is a rural locality 17.7 kilometres (11.0 mi) north-west of Ballarat, in western Victoria, Australia. It is located between Creswick and Learmonth. Blowhard was once a prominent mining area.

Mt Blowhard Primary School was erected by the Education Department in 1878 and is still operating as a primary school.

At the 2021 census, Blowhard had a population of 82.
