= Windermere, Victoria =

Windermere Victoria
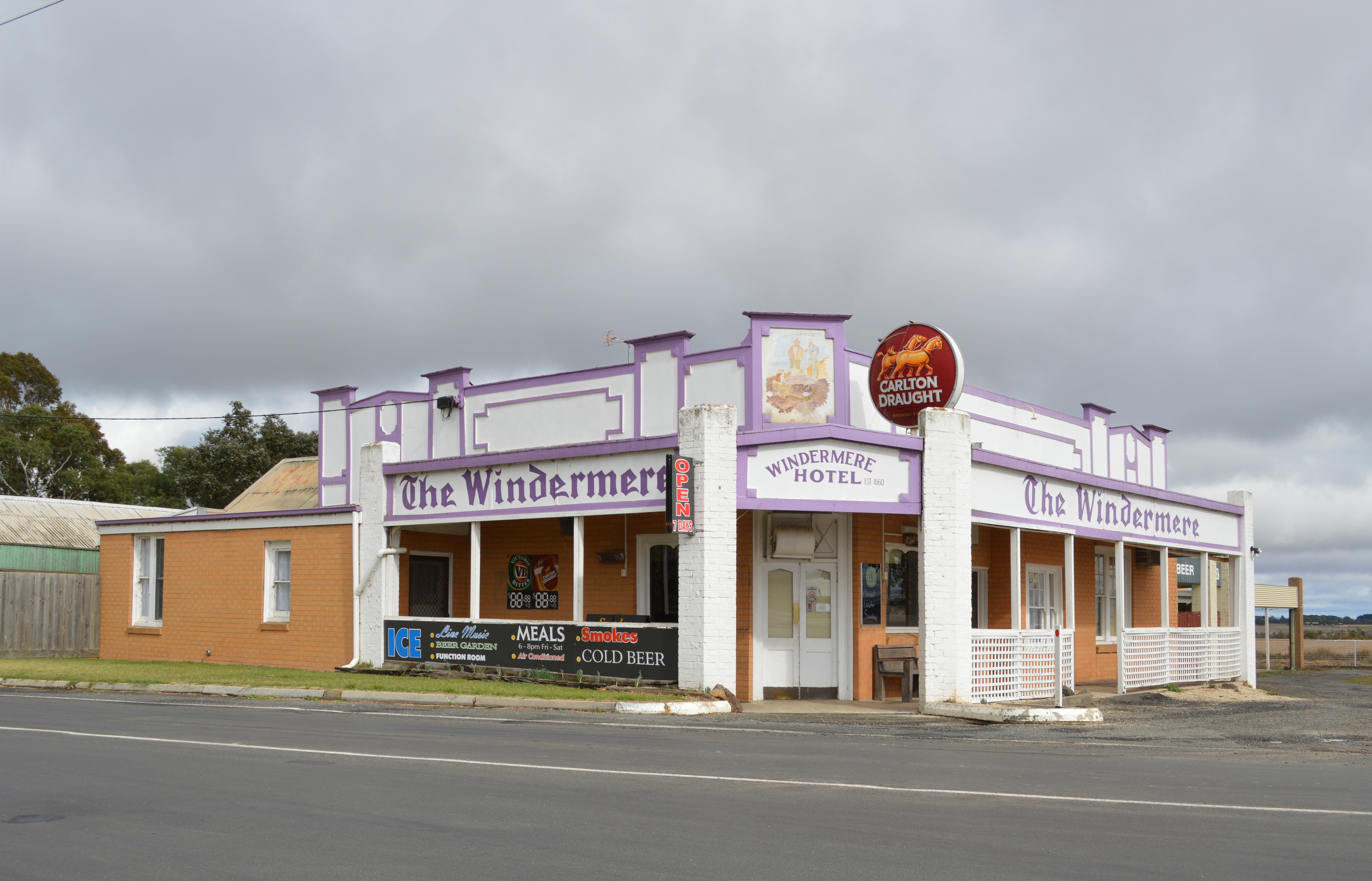
- Windermere Hotel, 2015

- Coordinates: 37°30′42″S 143°42′22″E
- Population: 96 (2021 census)
- Postcode(s): 3352
- Location: 134 km (83 mi) NW of Melbourne; 14 km (9 mi) w of Ballarat
- LGA(s): City of Ballarat
- State electorate(s): Ripon
- Federal division(s): Ballarat

Windermere is a locality in the City of Ballarat, Victoria, Australia, located 134 kilometres (83 mi) west of the state capital, Melbourne. At the 2021 census, Windermere had a population of 96.
