= Ascot, Ballarat =

Ascot
- Town
- Coordinates: 37.399°S 143.803°E
- Country: Australia
- State: Victoria
- LGA: City of Ballarat

Government
  - State electorate: Ripon
  - Federal division: Ballarat

Population
  - Total: 93 (2021 census)
- Postcode: 3364

Ascot is a locality in Victoria, Australia, 10 km west of Creswick in the City of Ballarat. At the 2021 census, Ascot had a population of 93.

A post office named "Ascot" opened on 11 October 1858 and closed in 1969.
