= Buninyong =

- Town
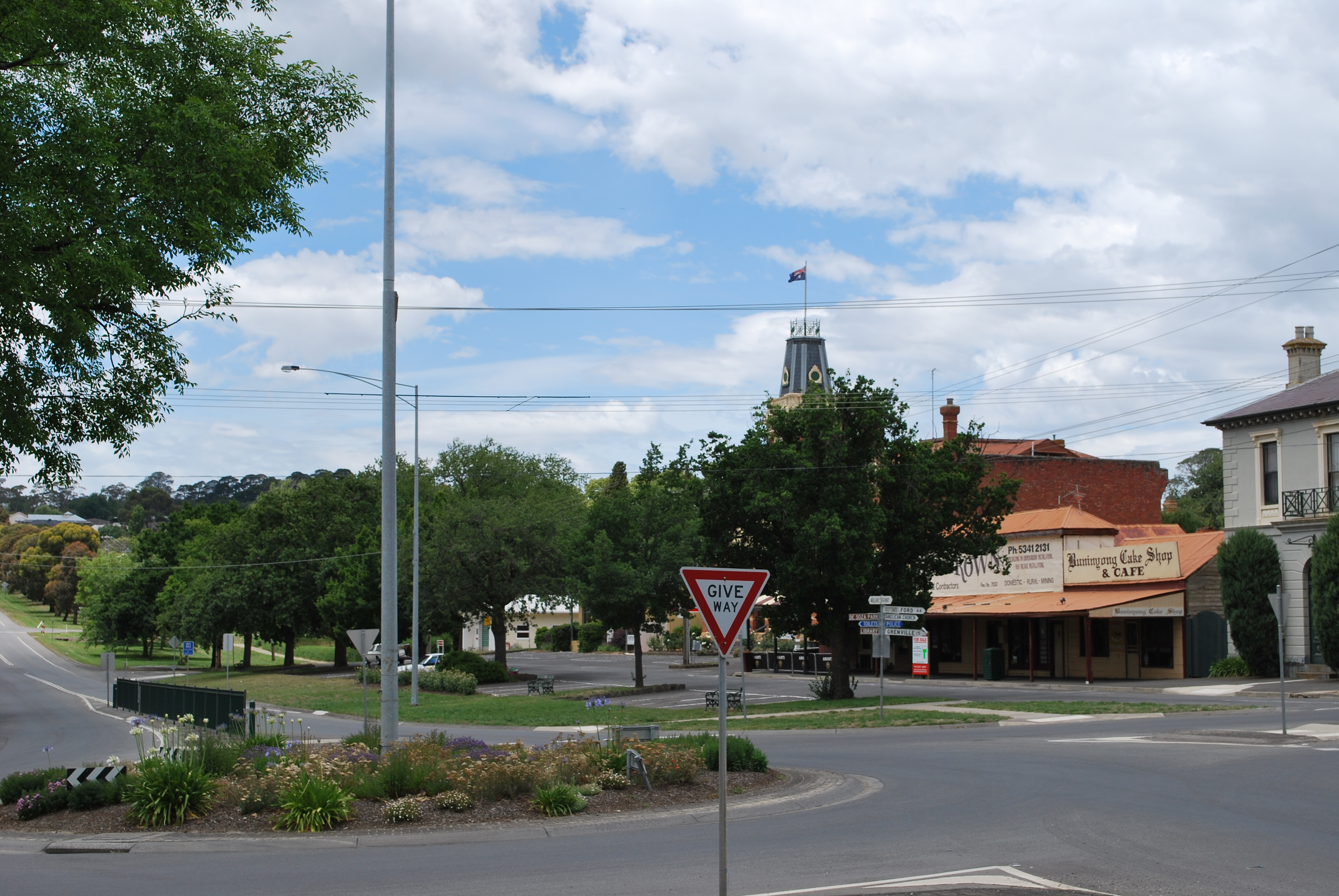
- Main Street, Buninyong

- Coordinates: 37°39′01″S 143°53′02″E
- Country: Australia
- State: Victoria
- LGAs: City of Ballarat; Shire of Moorabool
- Location: 10 km (6.2 mi) S of Ballarat; 69 km (43 mi) NW of Geelong; 97 km (60 mi) NW of Melbourne

Government
  - State electorate: Eureka
  - Federal division: Ballarat

Population
  - Total: 3,797 (2021 census)
- Postcode: 3357
Localities around Buninyong
Magpie	Mount Helen	Navigators
Magpie	Buninyong	Yendon
Scotchmans Lead	Durham Lead	Scotsburn

Buninyong /ˈbʌnɪnjɒŋ/ is a town 11 km (6.8 mi) south of Ballarat in Victoria, Australia on the Midland Highway. The population at the 2021 census was 3,797.

Buninyong was proclaimed a town on 27 June 1851 on the same day as Winchelsea, Portarlington, Longwood, Avenel, Cavendish, Euroa and Gisborne. All were preceded by Benalla and Wangaratta that were proclaimed on 7 and 11 April 1849 respectively.

Gold was reported "within a mile or two of the township of Buninyong" on 12 August 1851. Gold had been reported earlier at Clunes on 25 July 1851, The major gold rush to the Ballarat region had begun.

The name originates from an Aboriginal word also recorded as 'Buninyouang', said to mean 'man lying on his back with his knees raised', which is in reference to the shape of Mount Buninyong. European settlers named it Bunnenyong and the name later simplified to its current form.

== History ==
Buninyong has an important place in history as one of the principal inland communities of Victoria before the gold rush. It was explored in January 1838 by a party including Thomas and Somerville Learmonth, and then occupied by the Learmonths in February 1838 as a sheep station.

A Post Office opened on 1 January 1845 to serve the needs of the settlers and was known as Bunnenyong until 1859.

Although gold was being found in the area from about 1840 the 'official' finding of gold was when it was found 3 kilometres west of the town in 1851 by Thomas Hiscock, the local Buninyong blacksmith, at an area still known as Hiscock's. Evidence is slowly emerging that the early pastoralists were finding gold, but not making their good fortune known because of the fear the Colonial Government would confiscate their finds because the whole area was Crown Land. By 1871 there were 2281 people and 20 hotels at Buninyong.

A significant figure in Buninyong's gold rush era was Henry Joseph Desoza. Desoza was a wealthy philanthropist who made his fortune by both speculation and the leasing of both land and machinery to gold mining companies. One such enterprise was named the Desoza Freehold, from which Desoza received royalties. Desoza himself never held shares in The Desoza Freehold or any other mine he helped finance relying instead on the royalty system. In a peculiar ceremony in 1883 he was crowned with a circlet of gold mined from The Desoza Freehold. Thereafter Desoza was known as The Gold King of Buninyong. The Gold King title was celebrated in the township with a Gold King Festival held in February each year from 1975 to 2009.

The town's wide streets were planned in expectation of further growth, however prosperity ended with the gold rush and the town reverted to a small pastoral settlement.

A railway from Ballarat was opened in 1889 with the passenger station completed in 1890, although it is no longer used. The line ran from the Ballarat station stopping at Ballarat East Station, Eureka Station, Levy Siding, Canadian Station, Mount Clear Station, Reid Siding, Mt Helen Siding terminating at the Buninyong Station. Popularly named 'The Bunny' the line ceased to carry passengers in the late 1930s, and freight in 1947 when the line was closed.

Buninyong's landmarks include Mount Buninyong, gardens and the many historic buildings, including the Town Hall, Crown Hotel, Holy Trinity Church among others.

The Buninyong Botanic Gardens at Buninyong are among the oldest Botanic Gardens in the State of Victoria.

== Today ==
There are several grand "boom style" homes in and around the town.

The town has an Australian Rules football team competing in the Central Highlands Football League.

Golfers play at the Buninyong Golf Club on Learmonth Street.

The town is also the site of the Buninyong Bowling Club, which is one of the oldest bowling clubs in Australia (established in 1872).

Buninyong hosted segments of the Australian National Road Race Championships for cycling, held in January each year, from 2007 - 2024.

The Buninyong township has become the home of the De Soza parkrun from 22 November 2025.

== Notable residents ==
- John Alexander Gunn (1860–1910), Australian pioneer scientist and politician.
- Emmeline Pye (1861–1949), educationalist, teacher and lecturer.
- Robert Bath OAM (1936–2025), Australian Olympic boxer.
