= Addington, Victoria =

Addington
- Town
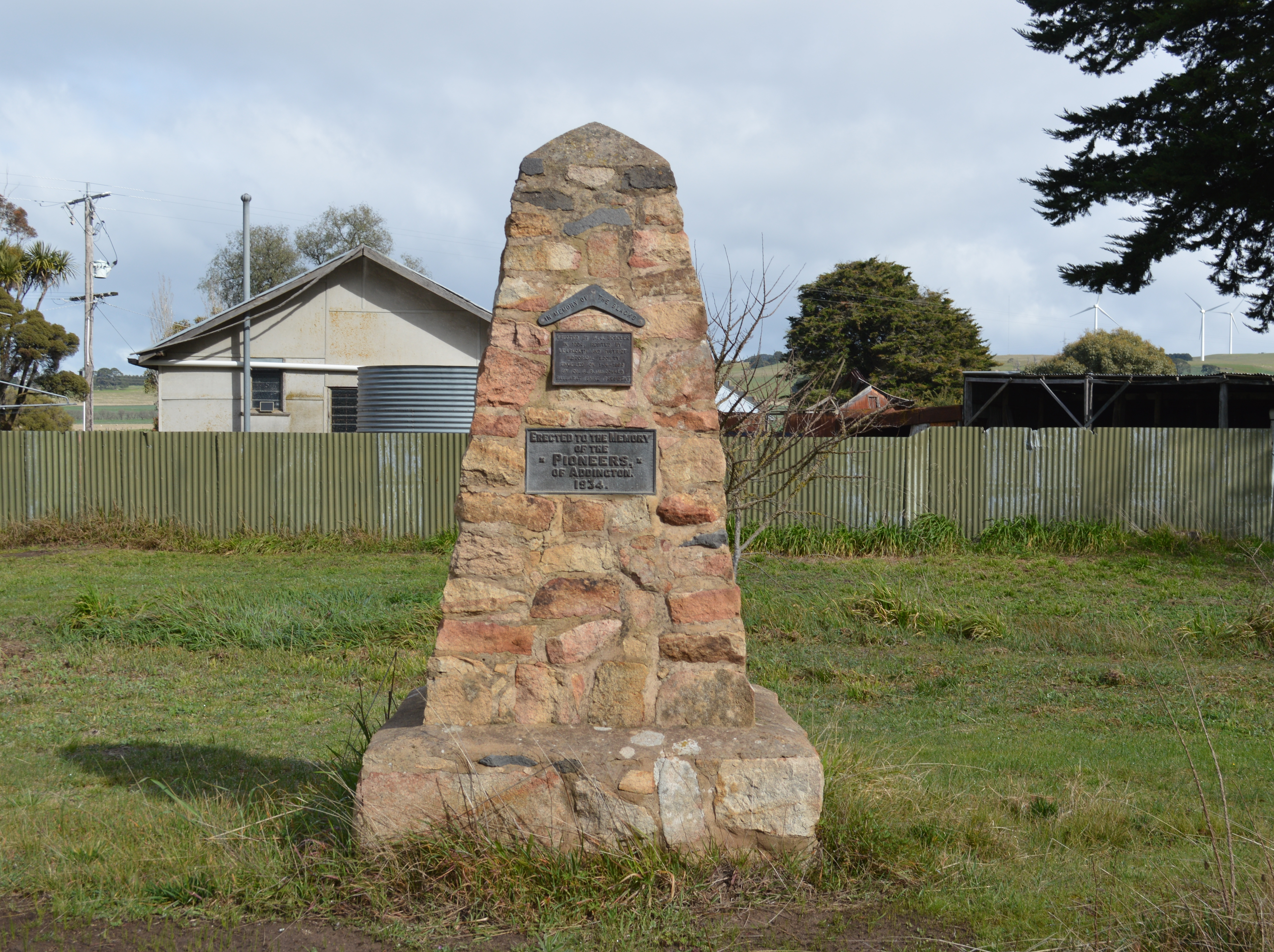
- Pioneer memorial at Addington, 2017

- Coordinates: 37°23′S 143°41′E
- Country: Australia
- State: Victoria
- LGA: City of Ballarat
- Location: 141 km (88 mi) NW of Melbourne; 28 km (17 mi) NW of Ballarat; 6 km (3.7 mi) NW of Learmonth; 6 km (3.7 mi) SE of Waubra

Government
  - State electorate: Ripon
  - Federal division: Ballarat

Population
  - Total: 65 (2021 census)
- Postcode: 3352

Addington is a town in Victoria, Australia. It is located at the junction of Langi Kal-Kal Road and Edmonston Road, about 28 kilometres north-west of Ballarat.

The town developed as an agricultural settlement around the Addington railway station. A state school opened in 1860 under the name Ercildoune, and the locality was referred to by the postal service as Mount Bolton. Around 1900 the school adopted the name Addington. The Mount Bolton Post Office opened on 1 May 1858, was renamed Addington in 1892, and closed in 1967.

Addington is home to one of Victoria's many Avenues of Honour, with Addington's being planted on 7 June 1917 in commemoration of locals who served during World War I.
