= Buninyong railway line =

Former railway line in Victoria, Australia

Coordinates: 37°40′00″S 143°55′00″E

Buninyong

Overview
- Status: Closed

Service
- Type: V/Line passenger service

History
- Work began: 1888
- Opened: 11 September 1889
- Closed: 2 February 1947 (Eureka to Buninyong); 1 December 1986

Technical
- Line length: 11 km (6.8 mi)

The Buninyong Line (also known as "Bunny Hop Line", or simply "The Bunny") was a Victorian Railways (Australia) branch line, which ran south from Ballarat to the nearby town of Buninyong. The line branched from the main Melbourne – Ballarat railway at Ballarat East station and was 11 km long. The line was opened on 11 September 1889, with traffic commencing the following day.

Passenger services on the line ceased in November 1930, and the section from Eureka to Buninyong was closed on 2 February 1947, leaving only a short branch to Eureka, which closed on 1 December 1986.

== Stations ==
=== 1890 ===
In the 1890s, the stations on the line were as follows:

- Ballarat
- Ballarat East
- Eureka
- Canadian
- Mount Clear
- Buninyong

=== 1900 ===
Additional stations were added in the early 1900s.

- Ballarat
- Ballarat East
- Eureka
- Spencer Crossing
- Canadian (originally named Butts)
- Mount Clear
- Mount Helen
- Buninyong

=== 1910–1930 ===
During this period, stations were added and/or renamed. On 24 November 1930, the Buninyong line was closed to passenger traffic and mixed trains. Goods trains continued to run as required.

- Ballarat
- Ballarat East
- Eureka
- York Street
- Levy
- Canadian
- Mount Clear
- Reid
- Mount Helen
- Buninyong

=== 1930–1947 ===
During the 1940s, five stations were closed, and the line continued to be used for goods traffic until 1947. Tenders for the removal and disposal of station buildings at Mount Helen and Canadian were called for in January 1932. The last remaining building after that was the stationmaster's cottage at Buninyong.

- Ballarat
- Ballarat East
- Eureka
- Canadian
- Buninyong

During World War II, an army camp was established at Buninyong, which resulted in a temporary increase in good services to one per day

=== 1947–1986 ===
During this time, the station and sidings at Eureka were the only part of the line still open. That section was officially closed on 1 December 1986.
