= Coghills Creek =

- Town
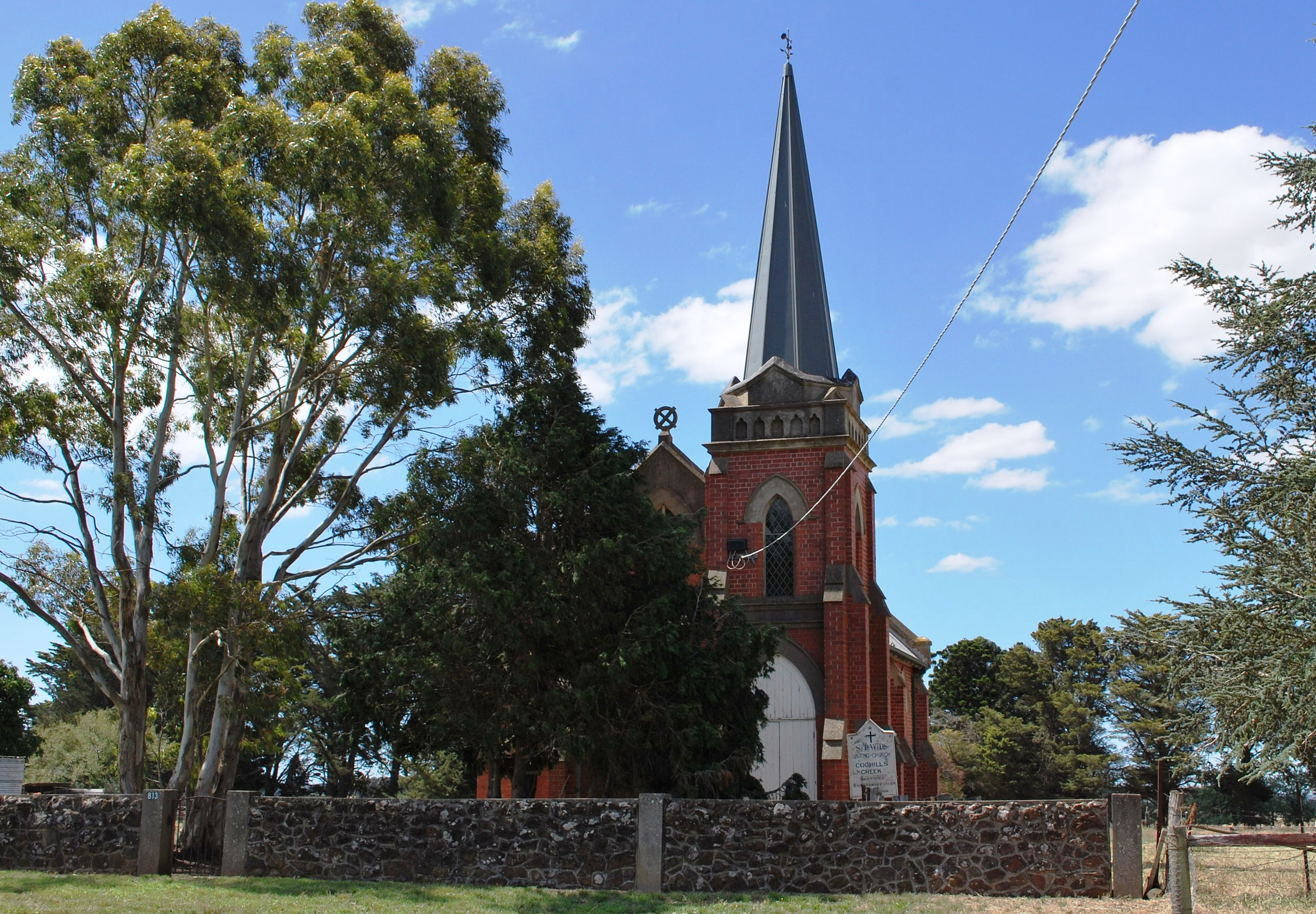
- St David's Uniting Church, Coghills Creek, 2008

- Coordinates: 37°23′04″S 143°43′30″E
- Country: Australia
- State: Victoria
- LGA: City of Ballarat
- Location: 136 km (85 mi) NW of Melbourne; 24 km (15 mi) N of Ballarat; 14 km (8.7 mi) W of Creswick

Government
  - State electorate: Ripon
  - Federal division: Ballarat

Population
  - Total: 80 (2021 census)
- Postcode: 3364

Coghills Creek is a locality in central Victoria, Australia. The locality is in the City of Ballarat local government area, 136 kilometres (85 mi) west of the state capital, Melbourne.

At the 2021 census, Coghills Creek had a population of 80.
