= Electoral district of Eureka =

State electoral district of Victoria, Australia

Eureka Victoria—Legislative Assembly
- Interactive map of electoral district boundaries from the 2022 state election
- State: Victoria
- Created: 2022
- MP: Michaela Settle
- Party: Australian Labor Party
- Namesake: Eureka
- Electors: 52,476
- Area: 3,915 km^{2} (1,511.6 sq mi)
- Demographic: Regional city
Electorates around Eureka:
| Ripon; Wendouree | Ripon | Macedon |
| Polwarth | Eureka | Melton |
| Polwarth | Polwarth | Lara; Geelong |

The Electoral district of Eureka is an electoral district of the Victorian Legislative Assembly in Australia. It was created in the redistribution of electoral boundaries in 2021, and came into effect at the 2022 Victorian state election.

It largely covers the area of the abolished district of Buninyong, covering the east and southeast suburbs of Ballarat, including the suburbs of Eureka, Brown Hill, Ballarat East, Golden Point, Canadian, Mount Pleasant, Mount Clear, Mount Helen and Buninyong. It also covers large parts of the Golden Plains Shire and Moorabool Shire areas, including the towns of Ballan, Bacchus Marsh, Meredith, Lethbridge, Teesdale and Inverleigh.

The abolished seat of Buninyong was held by Labor MP Michaela Settle, who recontested Eureka and retained the seat at the 2022 election.

== Election results ==
2022 Victorian state election: Eureka
| Party | Candidate | Votes | % | ±% |
|---|---|---|---|---|
| Labor | Michaela Settle | 18,531 | 41.0 | −3.6 |
| Liberal | Paul Tatchell | 14,320 | 31.6 | +0.7 |
| Greens | Sam McColl | 4,887 | 10.8 | +1.7 |
| Democratic Labour | Tabitha Rickard | 1,821 | 4.0 | +3.4 |
| Animal Justice | Wendy Morrison | 1,519 | 3.4 | −0.5 |
| Family First | Adrian Garcia | 1,233 | 2.7 | +2.7 |
| Independent | Nicola Reid | 1,083 | 2.4 | +2.4 |
| Freedom | Anthony Joseph Giampaolo | 967 | 2.1 | +2.1 |
| Independent | Michael Ray | 666 | 1.5 | +1.5 |
| Independent | Mark William Banwell | 220 | 0.5 | +0.5 |
| Total formal votes | | 45,247 | 93.2 | +1.0 |
| Informal votes | | 3,297 | 6.8 | −1.0 |
| Turnout | | 48,544 | 89.1 | −18 |
Two-party-preferred result
| Labor | Michaela Settle | 25,869 | 57.2 | −2.4 |
| Liberal | Paul Tatchell | 19,378 | 42.8 | +2.4 |
| Labor hold | | Swing | −2.4 | |

== See also ==
- Parliaments of the Australian states and territories
- List of members of the Victorian Legislative Assembly
