= BTM =

BTM may refer to:

== Entertainment ==
- Behind the Music and BTM2, a documentary television series on VH1
- Betraying the Martyrs (BtM), a French extreme metal band
- Blocks That Matter, 2011 computer game
- Before the Mourning, a former American heavy metal musical ensemble
- British Talent Management, a record label founded by Miles Copeland III

== Science and technology ==
- Bis-tris methane, a buffering agent used in biochemistry
- Bromotrifluoromethane, a chemical used for fire suppression and refrigeration
- RCS-4 or BTM-4, a synthetic cannabinoid
- RCS-8 or BTM-8, a synthetic cannabinoid
- Biot–Tolstoy–Medwin diffraction model, in mathematics, describes edge diffraction
- .btm, a batch file extension

== Transportation ==
- Ballarat Tramway Museum, Victoria, Australia
- Bert Mooney Airport (IATA code), near Butte, Montana, USA
- Brisbane Tramway Museum, Queensland, Australia
- Bristol Temple Meads railway station, Bristol, England

== Other uses ==
- Benefitive treasury measure, a cost-benefit analysis of immigration on a macroeconomic scale
- British Tabulating Machine Company, former data-processing equipment company
- Bronx Terminal Market, a shopping mall in Concourse, Bronx, New York
- BTM Antananarivo, a Malagasy football club in Antananarivo, Madagascar
- BTM Layout, a residential area in southern Bangalore, India
- BTM-1, a variant of the Martin AM Mauler, a United States Navy aircraft
- BTM-3, a Soviet-era trenching machine
- Bukit Timah Monkey Man, a Singapore cryptid
- Business Technology Management, a discipline in Business Administration
- Business Transaction Management, the practice of managing information technology
- Mandailing language, ISO 639-3 code

== See also ==
- H&BTM, Huntingdon and Broad Top Mountain Railroad and Coal Company (reporting mark HBTM), Pennsylvania, Pittsburgh, USA
