= CIBER =

CIBER is an acronym that may refer to

- Centre for Integrative Bee Research, an institution in Australia that makes basic scientific research concerning honeybee reproduction, immunity, and ecology.
- Cosmic Infrared Background ExpeRiment, an optical astrophysics payload for the California Institute of Technology
- Center for International Business Education and Research, an institution for international business education in the United States

== See also ==
- Ciber, an information technology company
- Cyber (disambiguation)
