= Ballarat Tramway Museum =

Tram museum in Ballarat, Victoria

- Established: 1971
- Location: Ballarat, Victoria, Australia
- Coordinates: 37.5515°S 143.8204°E

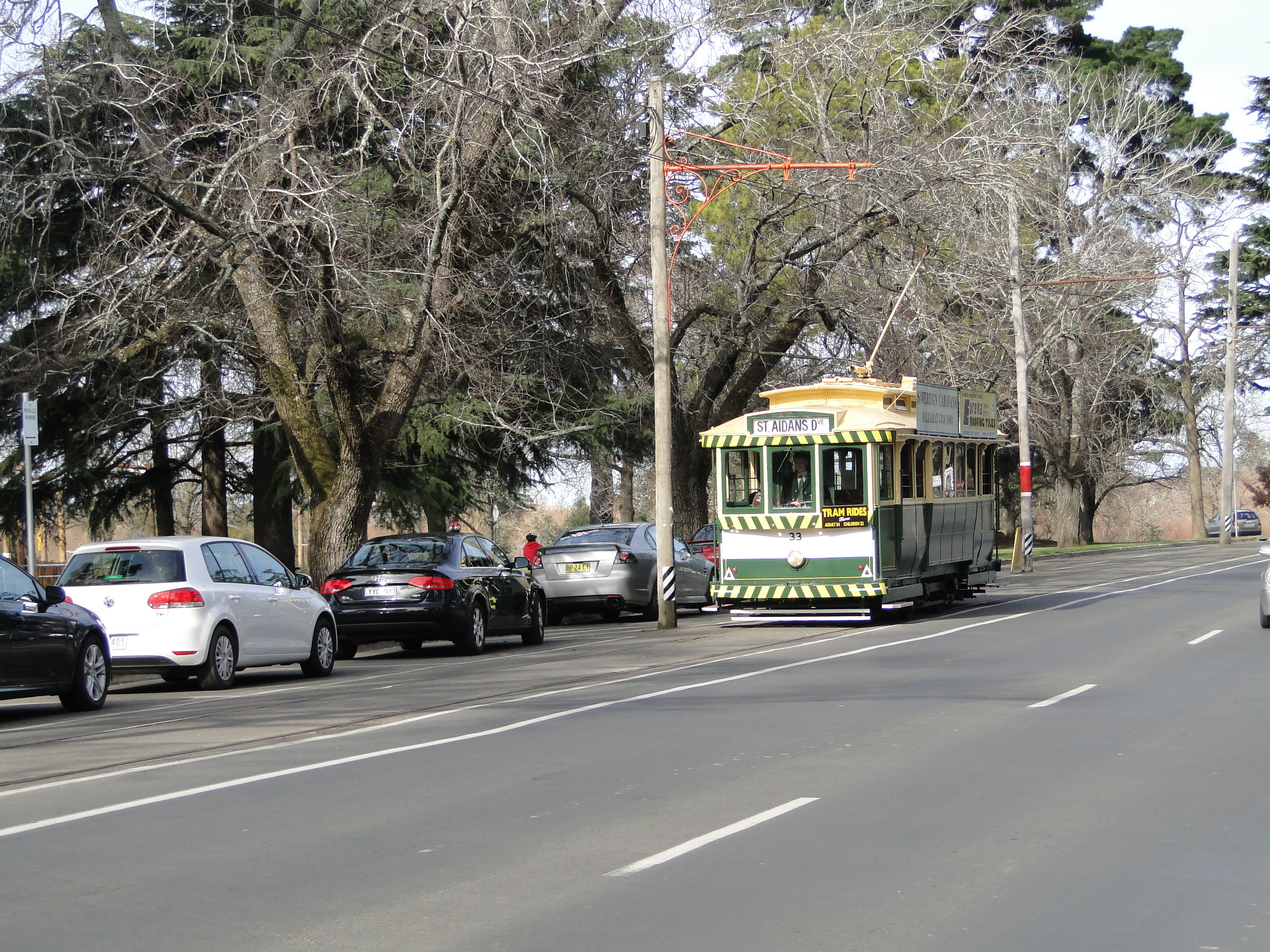
Ballarat tram No. 33 at Lake Wendouree

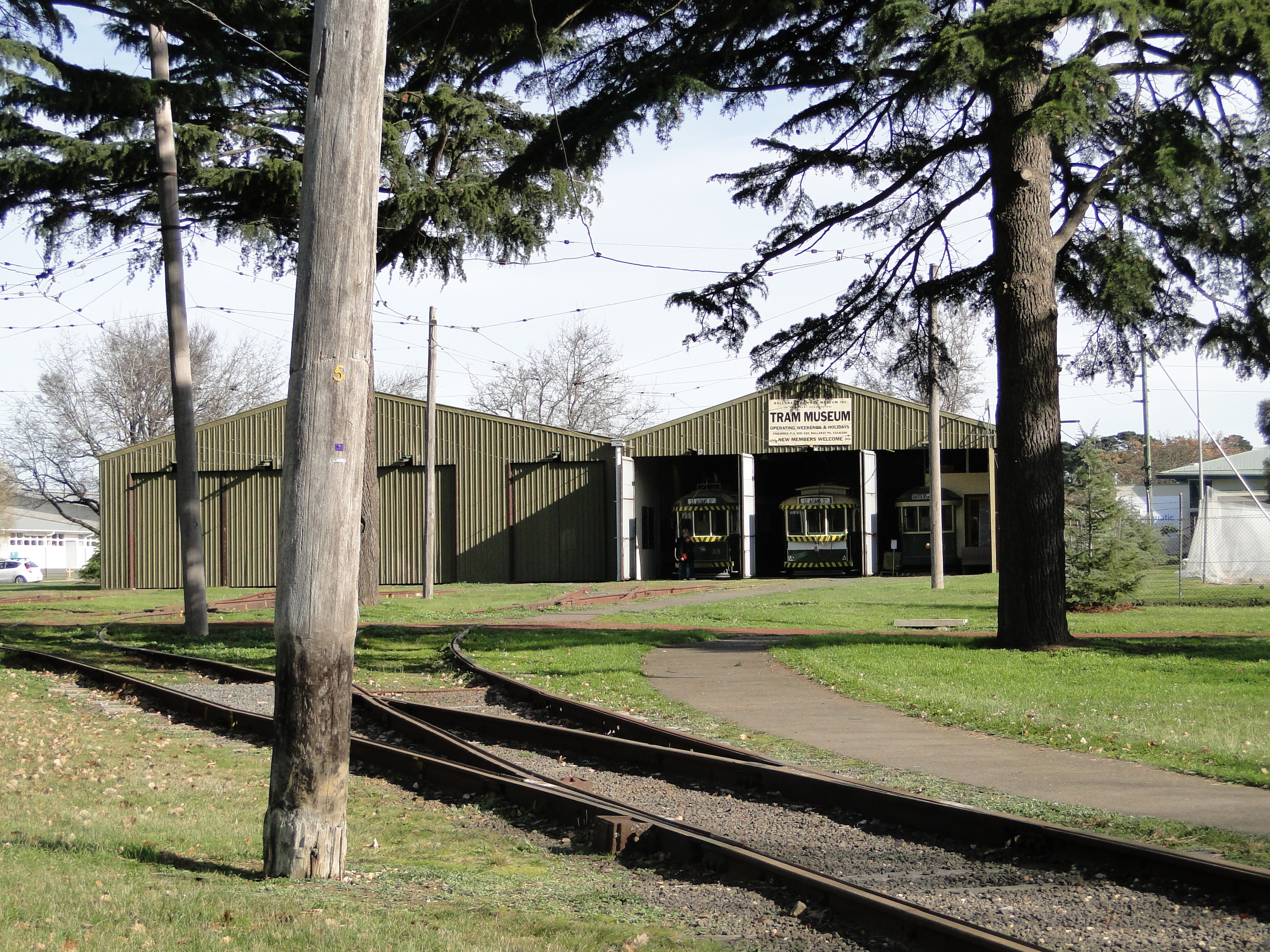
Ballarat Tramway Museum

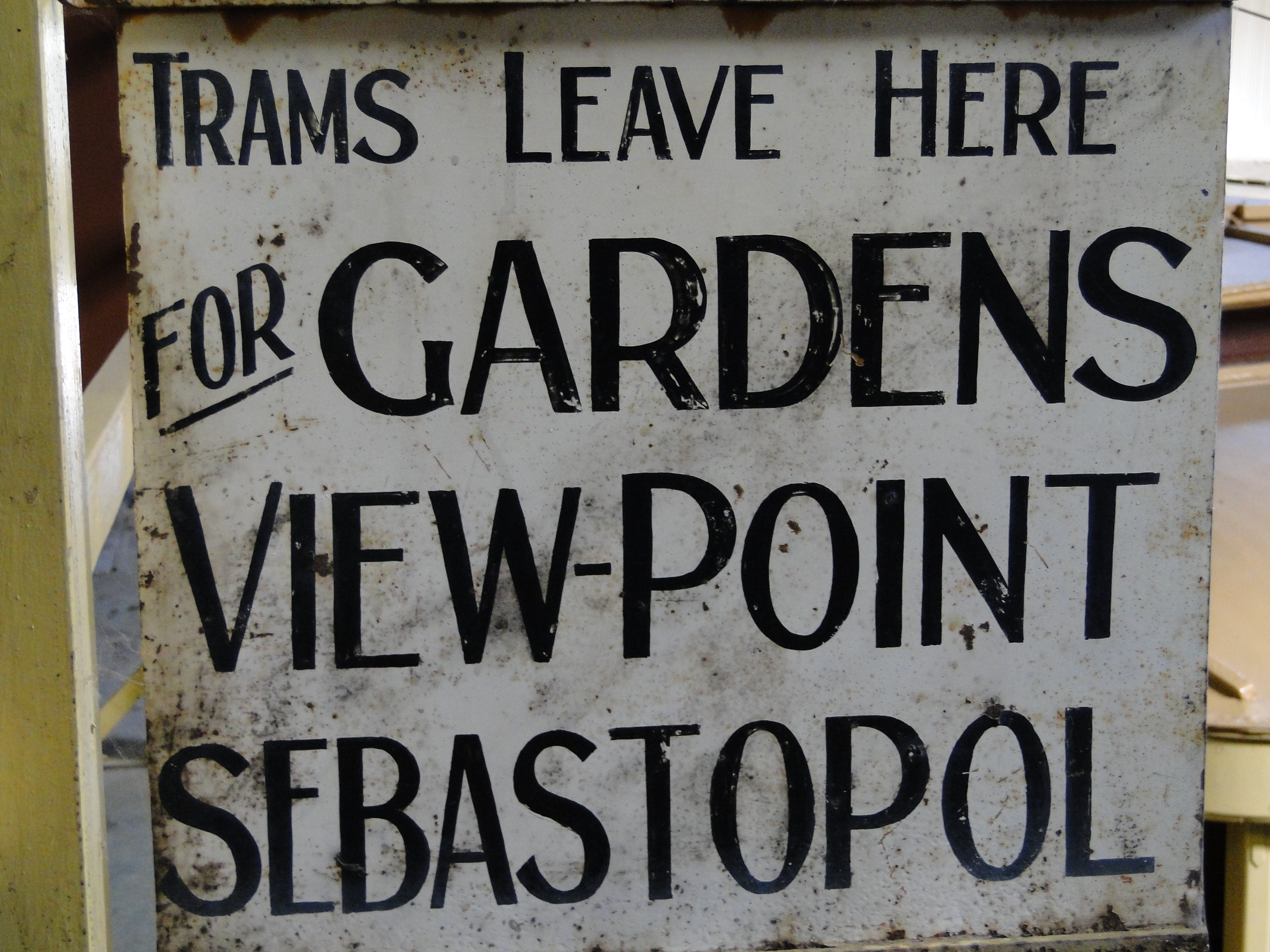
Tramway destination board

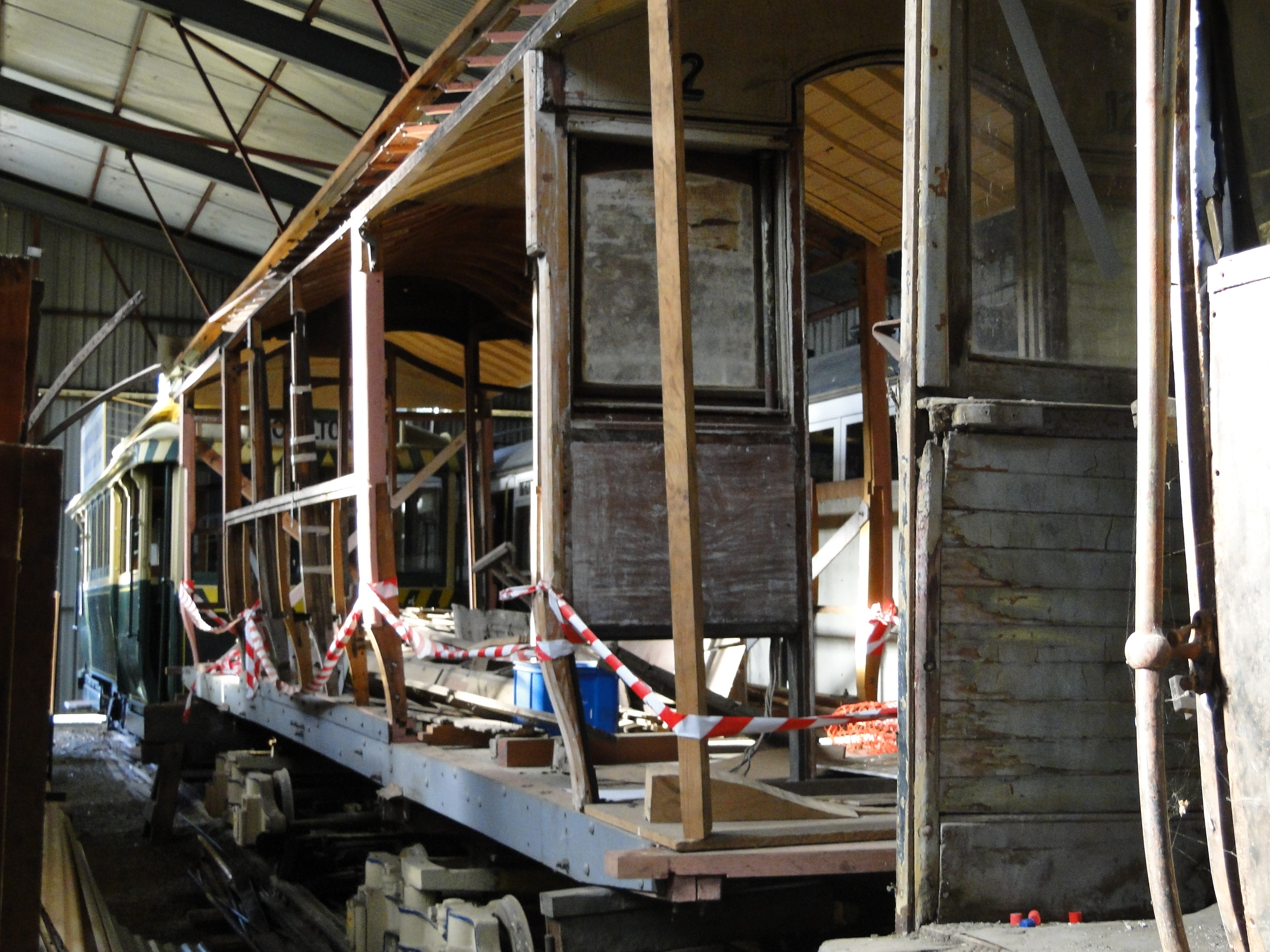
Tram restoration at the Ballarat Tramway Museum

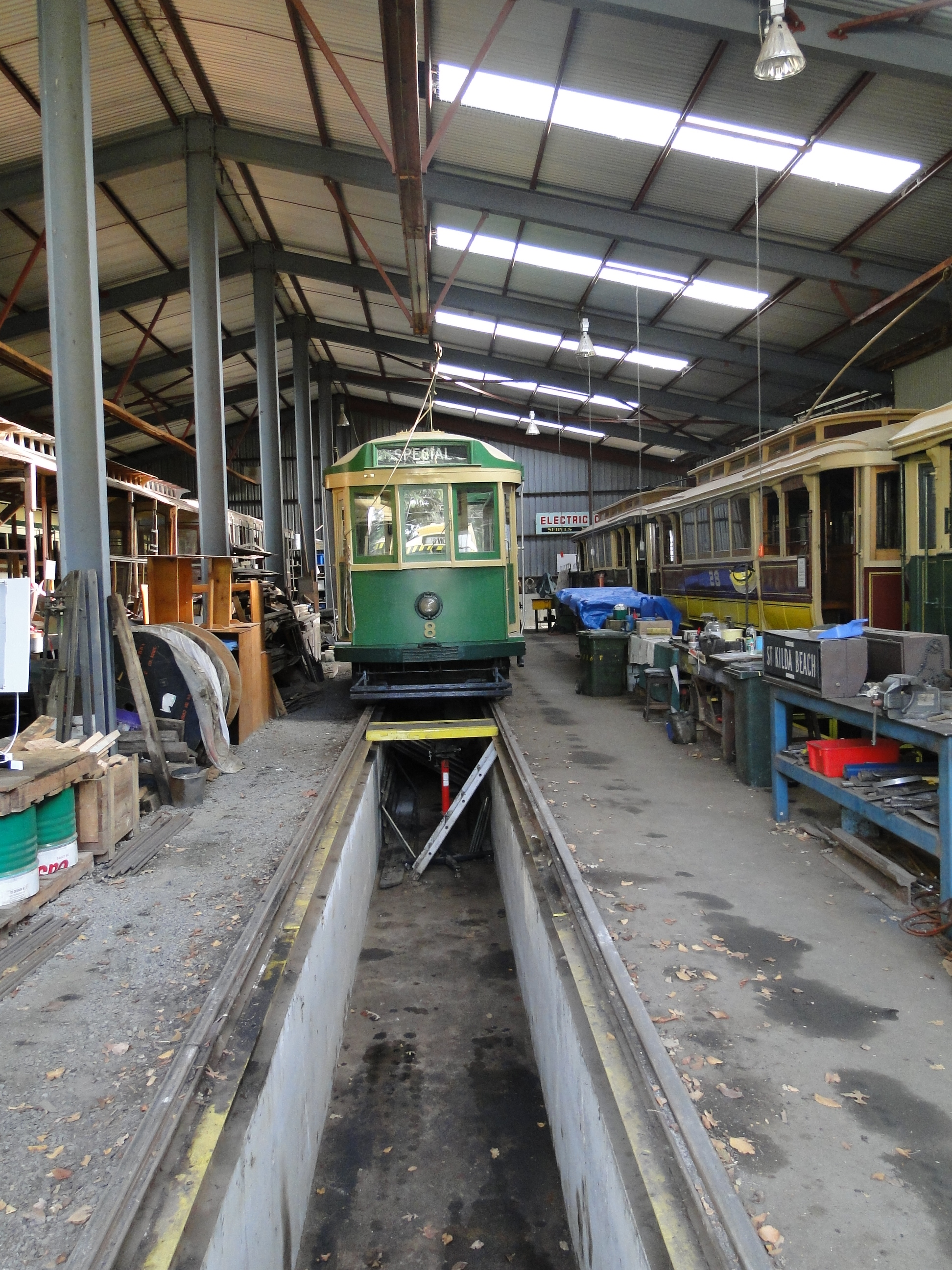
Ballarat Tramway Museum depot, Scrubber Tram No. 8 in view

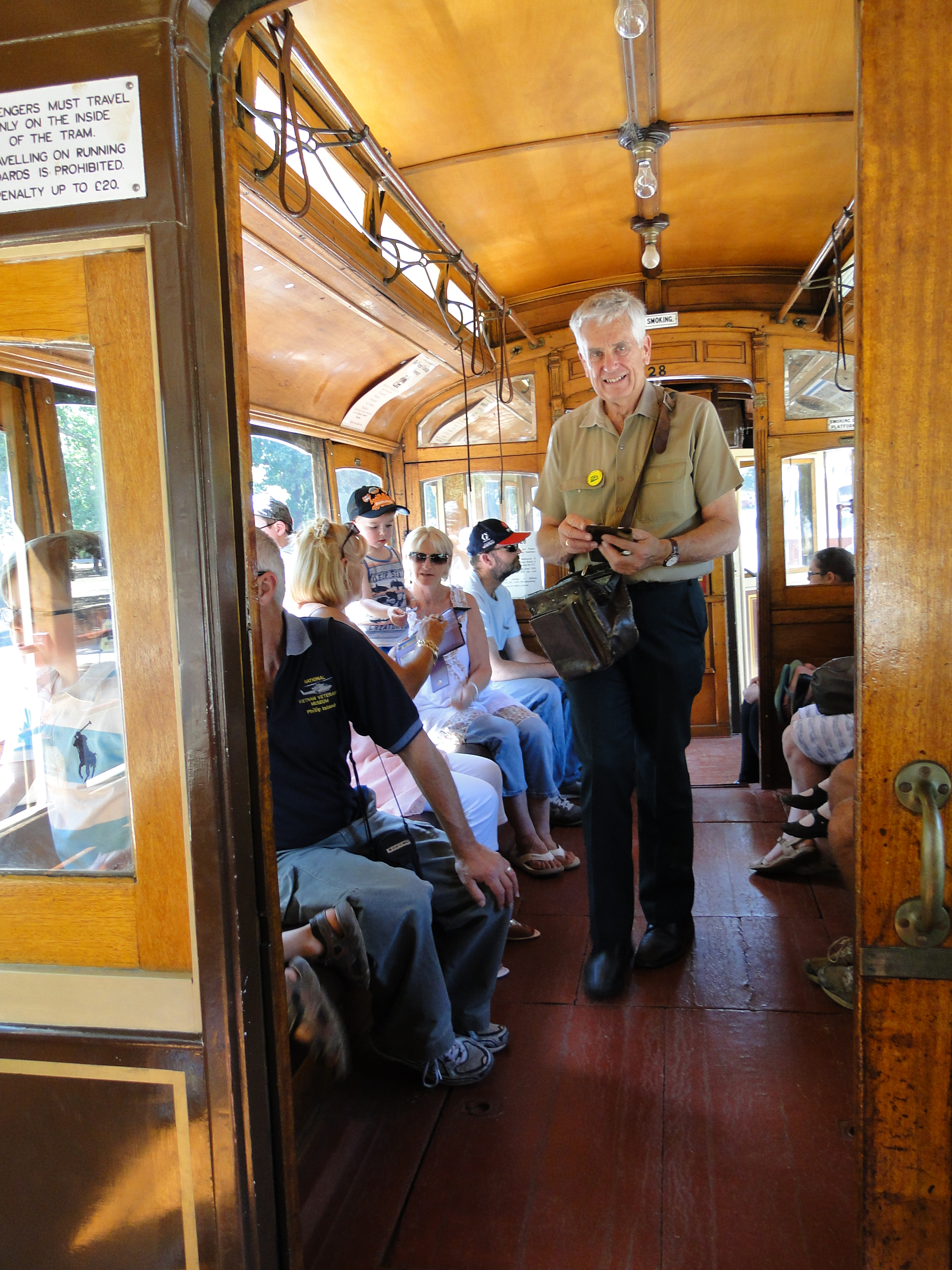
Conductor selling tickets on the tram

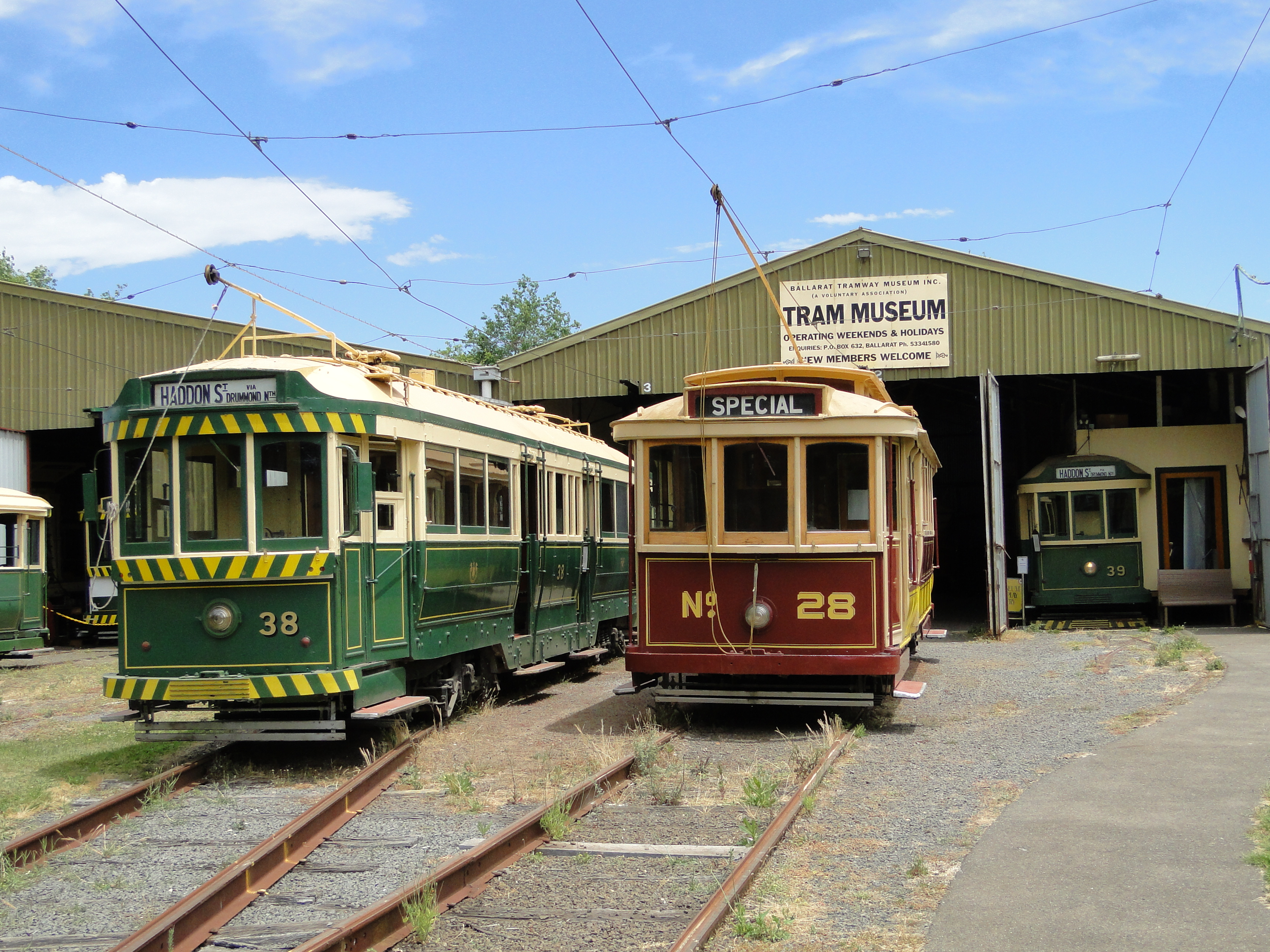
Ballarat trams No. 38 and No. 28

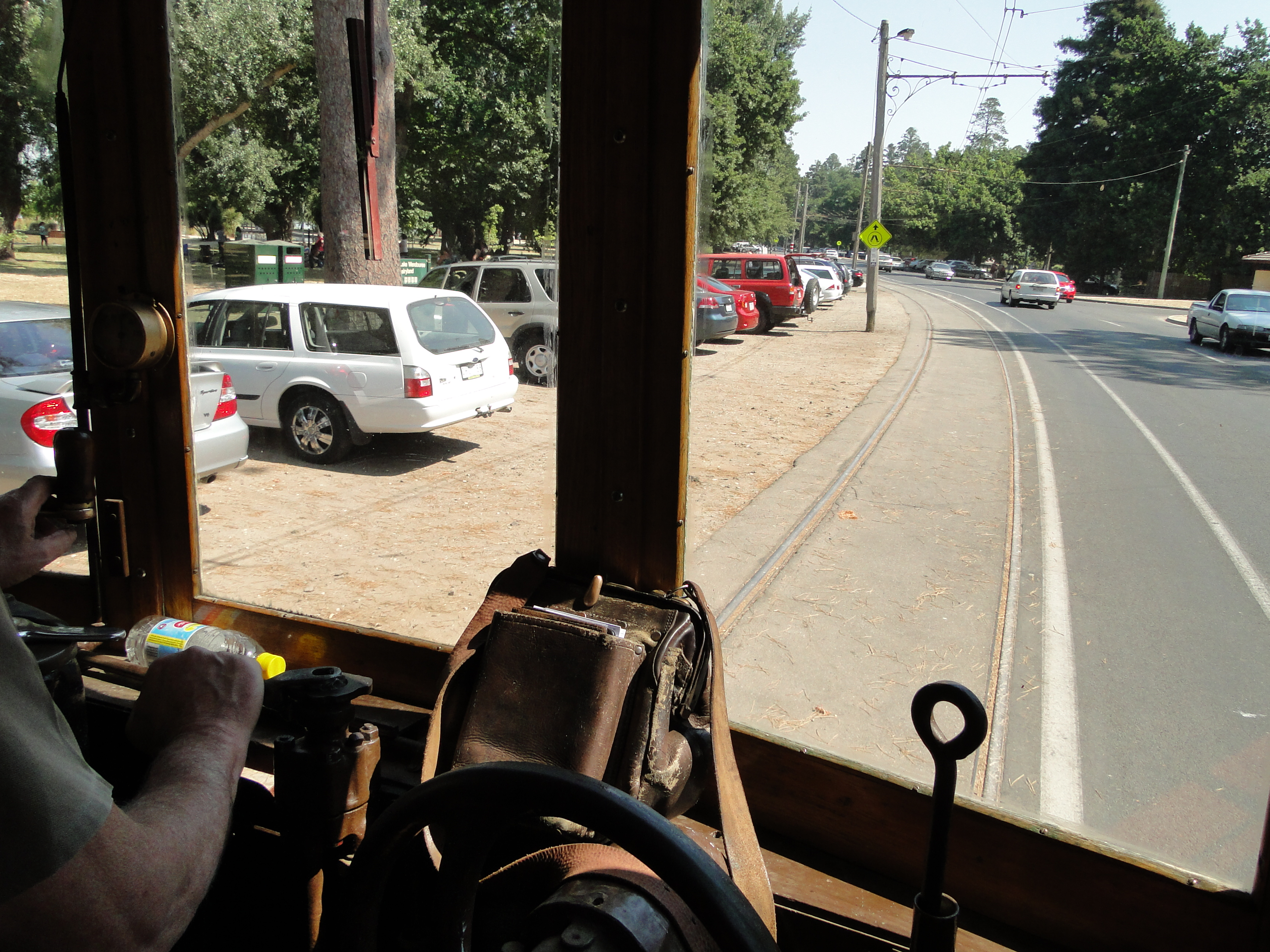
View from the driver's cabin

The Ballarat Tramway Museum is an operating tramway museum, located in Ballarat, Victoria, Australia. The museum is run by volunteers and has a fleet of trams which operate on part of the original horse tramway around Lake Wendouree and the Botanical Gardens. It has a large research collection, archive of information and more than 3,500 items about the Ballarat tramways. The trams in Ballarat operated on a large network through the city from 1887 until 1971.

== History ==
The first group to work on saving part of the historic tramway was the Lake Wendouree Tramway Museum Committee which in May 1971 began negotiating with the State Electricity Commission of Victoria (SEC) who was the operator of the trams. The Ballarat Tramway Preservation Society was also formed in 1971 to start, and run, an authentic tramway. In 1978 the society was incorporated, as the Ballarat Tourist Tramway. It was renamed the Ballarat Vintage Tramway in 1981. In 1995 they changed the name to the Ballarat Tram Museum Inc.

The original plan was to keep all the tramway that ran around the shores of Lake Wendouree. However, after discussions with the SEC and the City of Ballarat, only the section of track that was in the Botanical Gardens was kept. This included part of the original horse tramway that opened in 1887, and was electrified in 1905. The SEC donated the equipment, track, overhead wires, and trams.

A new tram depot was built as the original depot site was sold in June 1972. The City of Ballarat provided land in the South Gardens Reserve. Six Ballarat trams which had been stored in the old depot had to be towed around Lake Wendouree to the new site. An access track was laid and the trams were hand winched into the new shed. In July 1974 a new substation was built to supply DC current to the trams. On 12 October 1974, Tram No. 27 was able to make several trips along the access track. During November and December 1974 a track was laid to join the new depot to existing tram tracks in Wendouree Parade. This was quite a complex operation as the rails had to be bent to a curve by the Melbourne & Metropolitan Tramways Board's South Melbourne workshops and transported to Ballarat. Wendouree Parade had to be dug up and the new track laid.

The first trip on the museum's tramway was on 7 December 1974 when Tram No. 27 tested the connection to the tramway. Tram No. 40 was taken out of the depot and driven along the whole track. No. 40 had been the last tram to run on the SEC network. Passengers were carried for the first time on 24 December 1974, and regular services began on 26 December. The track was officially opened on 1 February 1975.

A $2 million display building was opened in 2022. The display space allows a number of trams to be displayed and includes information boards and interactive screens.

== Tram fleet ==
The SEC gave the museum five trams in 1971. They also gave the City of Ballarat one tram which was added to the museum fleet. The museum has since located and brought back a number of other Ballarat trams. One tram had been given to the Borough of Sebastopol and had been on display in a park for 10 years. The Ballarat Tramway Museum has restored this tram to working condition. An original horse tram was found being used as sleepout in Ballarat. After extensive rebuilding, and the discovery that it was the original Number One tram from 1887, it is now used for special occasions. The museum also operates two large W class trams from Melbourne.

=== List of trams ===
- Number 1: built 1887, one of 18 horse trams built by Duncan & Fraser of Adelaide for the Ballarat Tramway Company. This tram has been almost totally rebuilt after being recovered in 1985. It was put back into service in 1992 and is used several times each year using horses.
- Geelong Number 2: built 1912 by Duncan and Fraser of Adelaide and railed in KCD condition to the Melbourne Electric Supply Co. (MESCo) depot in Geelong Is the only known surviving of its kind (of 7)
- Number 8: built 1934 for the Melbourne & Metropolitan Tramways Board (MMTB). Used as a track cleaner, brought to Ballarat in 1999. It still in use to clean the tracks.
- Number 11: built 1915 by the Meadowbank Manufacturing Company for the Prahran & Malvern Tramways Trust. It was a J class tram, single truck, known as an open California combination car. This became MMTB J class tram No. 65. It was bought by the Melbourne Electric Company in 1928 and used in Geelong as tram No. 28. The SECV moved the tram to Ballarat in 1936 and it became No. 11. It was donated to the Daylesford Historical Museum in 1971 by the SECV. It was brought back to Ballarat in 1977. This tram is not in a working condition and is in storage off site.
- Number 12: built in 1892 as a cable car trailer for use in Sydney, North Sydney cable car 18. Brought to Ballarat in 1905 and converted to an electric tram. Sold in 1935 for use as a room on a house. Recovered in 1990 and now being restored.
- Number 13: built in 1915 for the Prahran & Malvern Tramways Trust. It was J class tram, single truck, known as an open California combination car. This J class tram was PMTT-68, and in 1919 became MMTB J68. It was used in Geelong from 1928 as Tram No. 30, and brought to Ballarat in 1936 by the SECV as No.13. Donated to the Lake Goldsmith Steam Preservation Society in 1971. Returned to Ballarat in 1983 on loan from Lake Goldsmith.
- Number 14: built in 1915 for the Prahran & Malvern Tramways Trust, this was a J class, single truck, open California combination car and numbered PMTT-75. It was renumbered by the MMTB in 1919 as J75. It was sold to Geelong in 1928 and became Geelong Tram No.29. The SECV moved the tram to Ballarat in 1936 and it became No.14. This tram is owned by the City of Ballarat.
- Number 18: built in 1913 for the Prahran & Malvern Tramways Trust, it was numbered PMTT 63. It was an H class tram, single truck, known as an open California combination car. When the MMTB took over in 1919 it was renumbered H 63, and then changed in 1928 to A 63. It was sold to Ballarat in 1931 and became Ballarat No.18. It completed 748,841 miles in Ballarat. In 1971 it was donated to the Borough of Sebastopol by the SECV and put on display in a park. Restored by the museum in 1982, the tram is in regular service. It is painted in 1960s SEC colors.
- Number 21: built in 1913 in Ballarat for Electric Supply Company of Victoria. The style was known as the "Sebastopol" tram. Sold in 1935 for use in a house near Daylesford, and returned to Ballarat in 1994. This tram is in poor condition and suitable only for parts. It is currently in storage offsite.
- Number 22: built in 1913 in Ballarat for Electric Supply Company of Victoria. Another "Sebastopol" tram. Sold in 1935 for use in a house near Ballarat, and returned to the museum in 2009. This tram is in poor condition, however some restoration work has been undertaken. It was placed back in off site storage in 2014.
- Number 26: built in 1916 for the Hawthorn Tramways Trust as HTT-5. It was an M class tram, single truck, known as an open California combination car. It was renumbered M111 by the MMTB in 1919, in 1928 it was changed to A111. It was brought to Ballarat in 1930 as No.26. It completed 1,023,121 miles around Ballarat. This was the museum's first tram to carry passengers when it took a school group at 6.00 pm on 24 December 1974.
- Number 27: built in 1916 for the Hawthorn Tramways Trust, later became M 116, and was brought to Ballarat in 1930. It was an M class tram, single truck, known as an open California combination car. It completed 987,283 miles. In 1963 it was seriously damaged in a collision. It is painted in 1935 colors.
- Number 28: built in 1916 for the Hawthorn Tramways Trust as HTT-7. It was an M class tram, single truck, known as an open California combination car. In 1919 the MMTB numbered it M113, and changed it to A113 in 1928. It was brought to Ballarat in 1930 as No.28. It operated for 1,032,341 miles around Ballarat. This was one of the six trams given to the museum by the SEC. It had been damaged in an accident and needed major repairs. It has now been restored twice. It is painted in 1930s colors. This tram has damaged motors. It has been since removed from service and stored offsite
- Number 32: built in 1917 for the Hawthorn Tramways Trust but sold as new to the Footscray Tramway Trust. It was an M class tram, single truck, known as an open California combination car. It was number M189, and became MMTB M186 in 1919. In 1928 it was renumbered A186. Brought to Ballarat by the SECV in 1935 as No.32. Sold in 1971 to the Maryborough Wildlife Park, and returned to Ballarat in 1986. This tram is currently on display in the Museum display building in unrestored condition.
- Number 33: built in 1917 for the Hawthorn Tramways Trust but sold as new to the Footscray Tramways Trust. It was an M class tram, single truck, known as an open California combination car. It ran in Melbourne as MMTB Tram 189. Brought to Ballarat in 1935. Sold in 1971 to the Hamilton Pastoral Museum, and returned to Ballarat in 1977.
- Number 38: built in 1914 for the Prahran & Malvern Tramways Trust. This was an E class maximum traction, bogie, drop end and centre combination, built by Duncan & Fraser. It became MMTB 41. It was converted for one man operation. Brought to Ballarat in 1951 and renumbered 38. It completed 347,507 miles in Ballarat.
- Number 39: built in 1914 for the Prahran & Malvern Tramways Trust. It was an E class maximum traction, bogie, drop end and centre combination, built by Duncan & Fraser. It became MMTB Tram 42. Brought to Ballarat in 1951, renumbered as Tram 39, where it completed 375,981 miles. Sold to the Lismore Lions Club in 1971 and used for display in a park. Returned to Ballarat in 1977 and converted into a museum display area and shop at the Ballarat Tramway Museum.
- Number 40: built in 1913 for the Prahran & Malvern Tramway and numbered PMTT 35. It was a maximum traction, bogie, drop end and centre combination, built by Duncan & Fraser (1913). It became a C class tram for the MMTB. It brought to Ballarat in 1951 and renumbered as Tram 40. It completed 376,387 miles in Ballarat. This was the last tram to run on the Ballarat tramway network, and the first tram to operate on the Ballarat Tramway Museum tracks.

Ex Melbourne trams that did not originally operate in Ballarat

- Number 407 W2 Class 407 entered service in Melbourne on 5 October 1926 as a W Class tram, being converted to a W2 Class tram in the early 1930s Built By M&MTB's Preston Workshops
- Victorian Railways Number 41 VR Tram 41 entered service in Melbourne on 3 February 1923 and spent its entire life running the St. Kilda – Brighton Beach line, when the VR Tramways closed it was used as a tool shed at a house in Brighton, it has been restored to original condition
- Number 661: One of the 15 W3 class trams built 1930–1934 for the Melbourne & Metropolitan Tramways Board and withdrawn from service in 1969. The W3 class had larger wheels and were the first trams built with a steel frame. Brought to Ballarat in 1976. This tram was badly damaged in a collision in March 2019, and has been placed into storage.
- Number 671: This was one of the four W4 class trams built in 1933–1935 for the Melbourne & Metropolitan Tramways Board. These were the first wide body trams. Brought to Ballarat in 1976.
- Number 924: This is a Melbourne SW6 class tram, currently in storage. It went into service with the MMTB on 13 December 1946.
- Number 939: This is a Melbourne SW6 class tram which went into service 26 November 1948. It was later converted into Colonial Tramcar Restaurant car "Valentine" for use in Melbourne. It was taken out of service in 2011, and purchased by the museum in 2013. After 18 months restoration the tram returned to service in April 2016 for use as a cafe/special function vehicle, named as "Cuthberts 939".
- Number 1029: Melbourne W7 class tram which went into service 1 February 1956. Re-entered service on the 18th of November 2023 on the Museum's 100 Years of W Class celebration event.
- Number 1039: Melbourne W7 class tram which went into service 20 July 1956 and withdrawn 5 May 2014. Currently in storage off site.
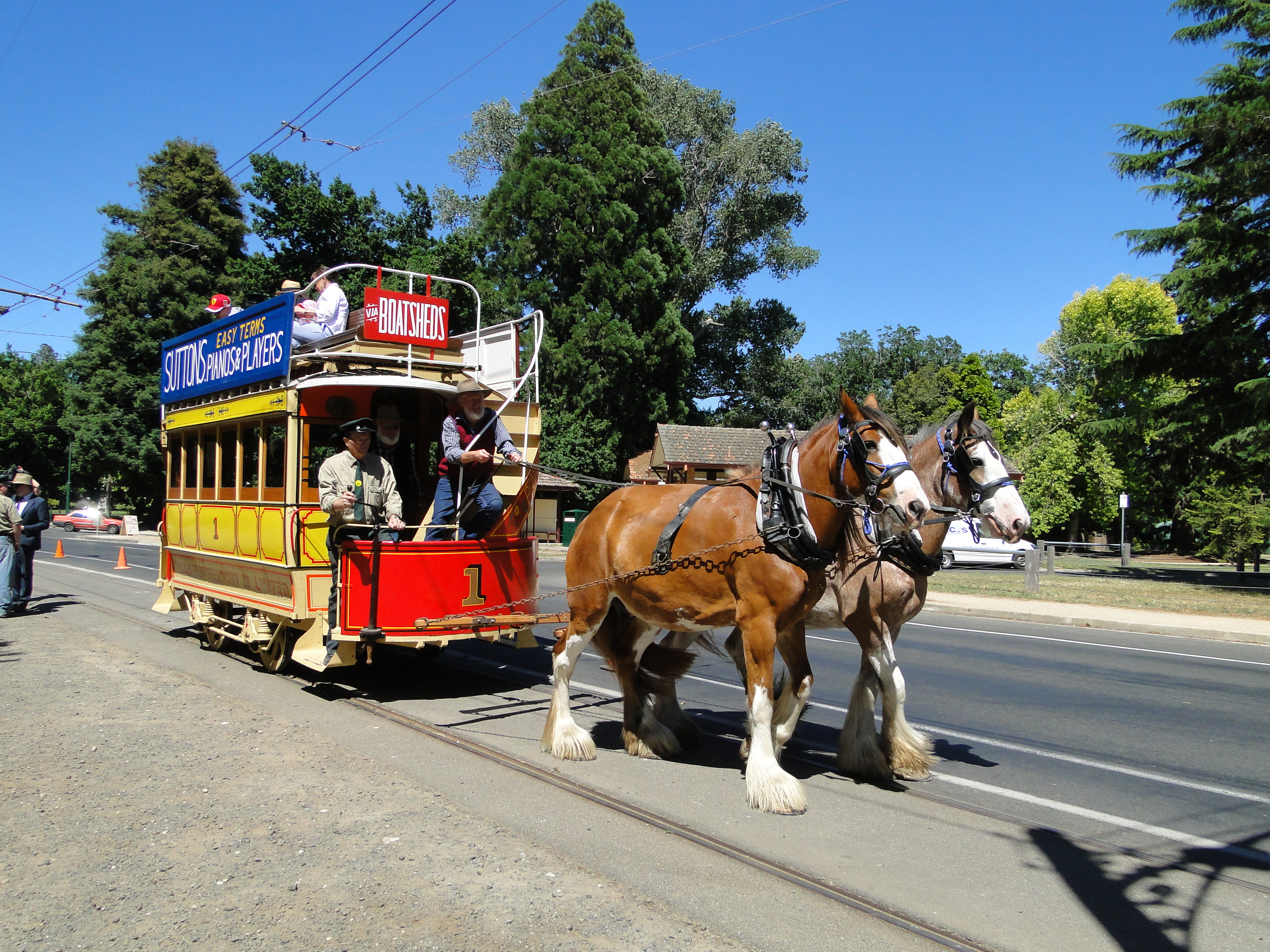
No. 1

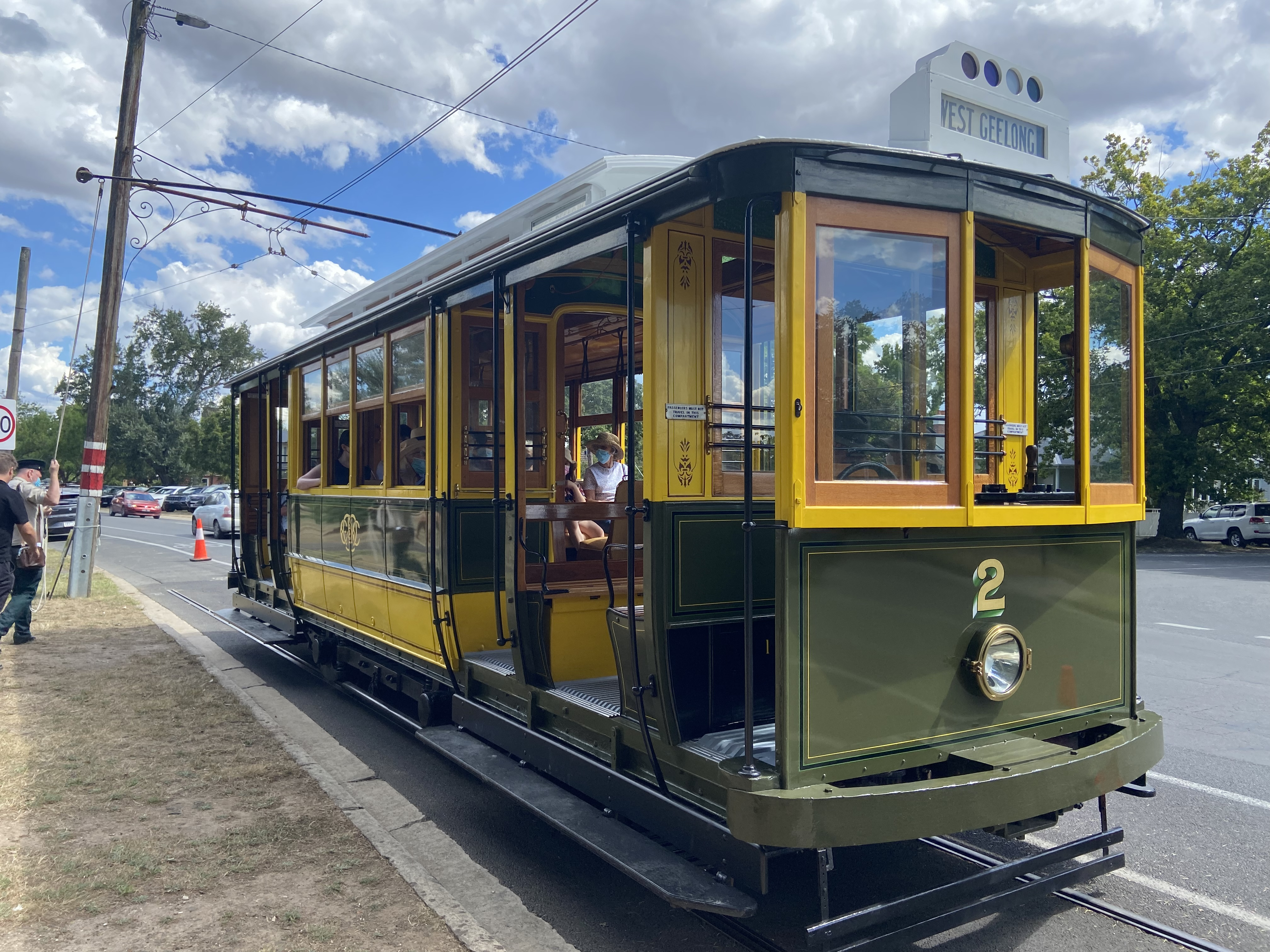
No. 2

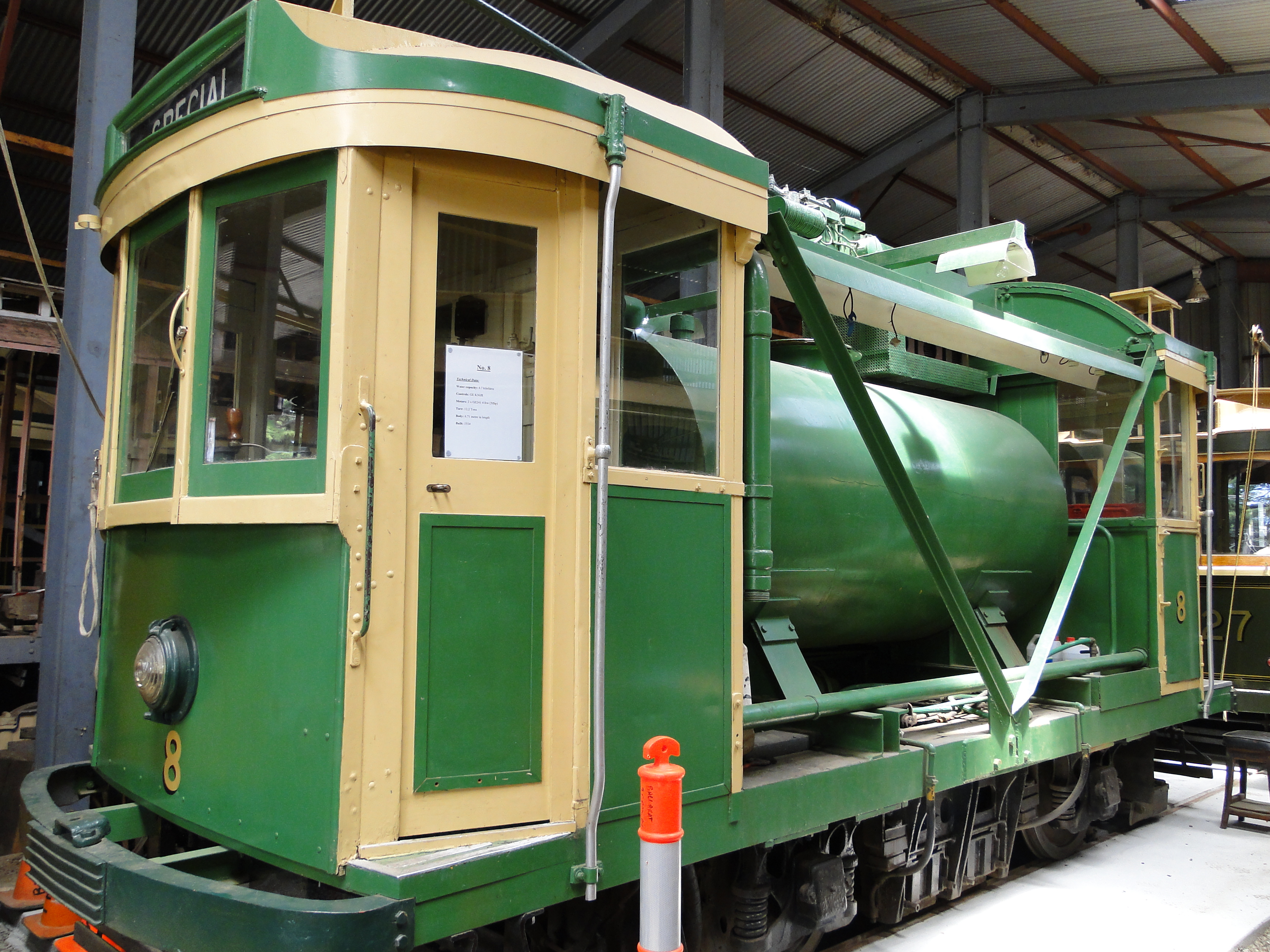
No. 8

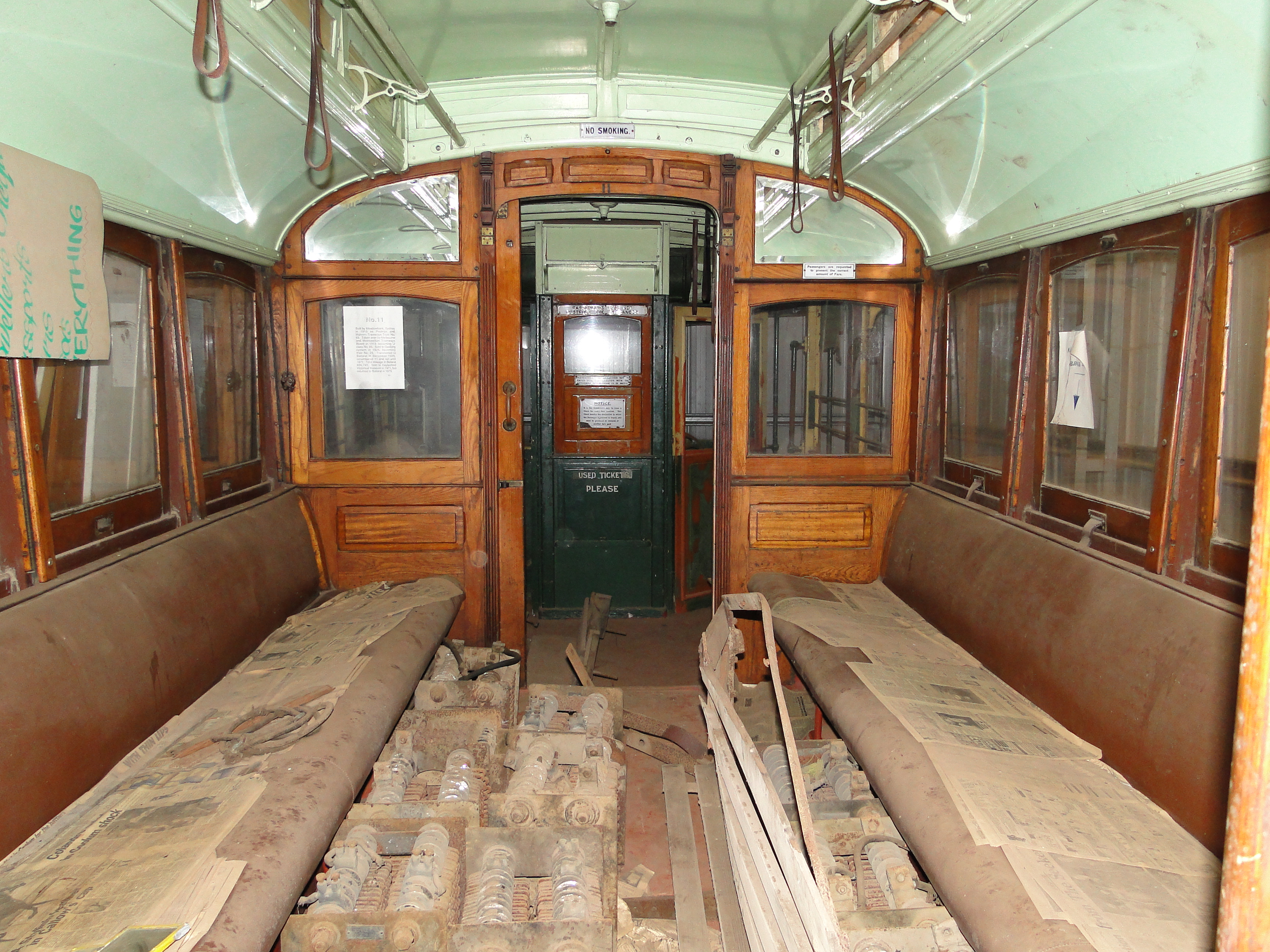
No. 11

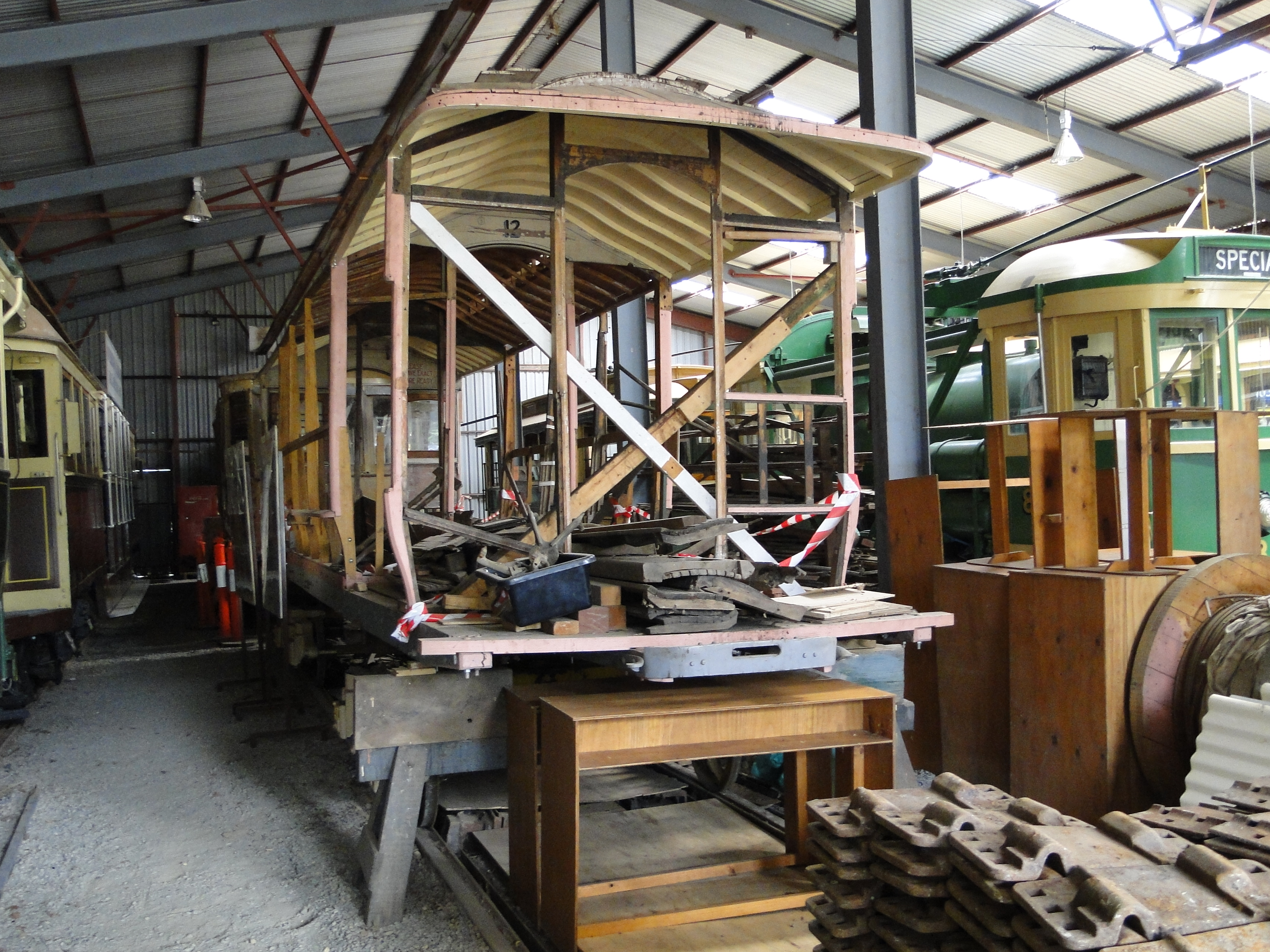
No. 12

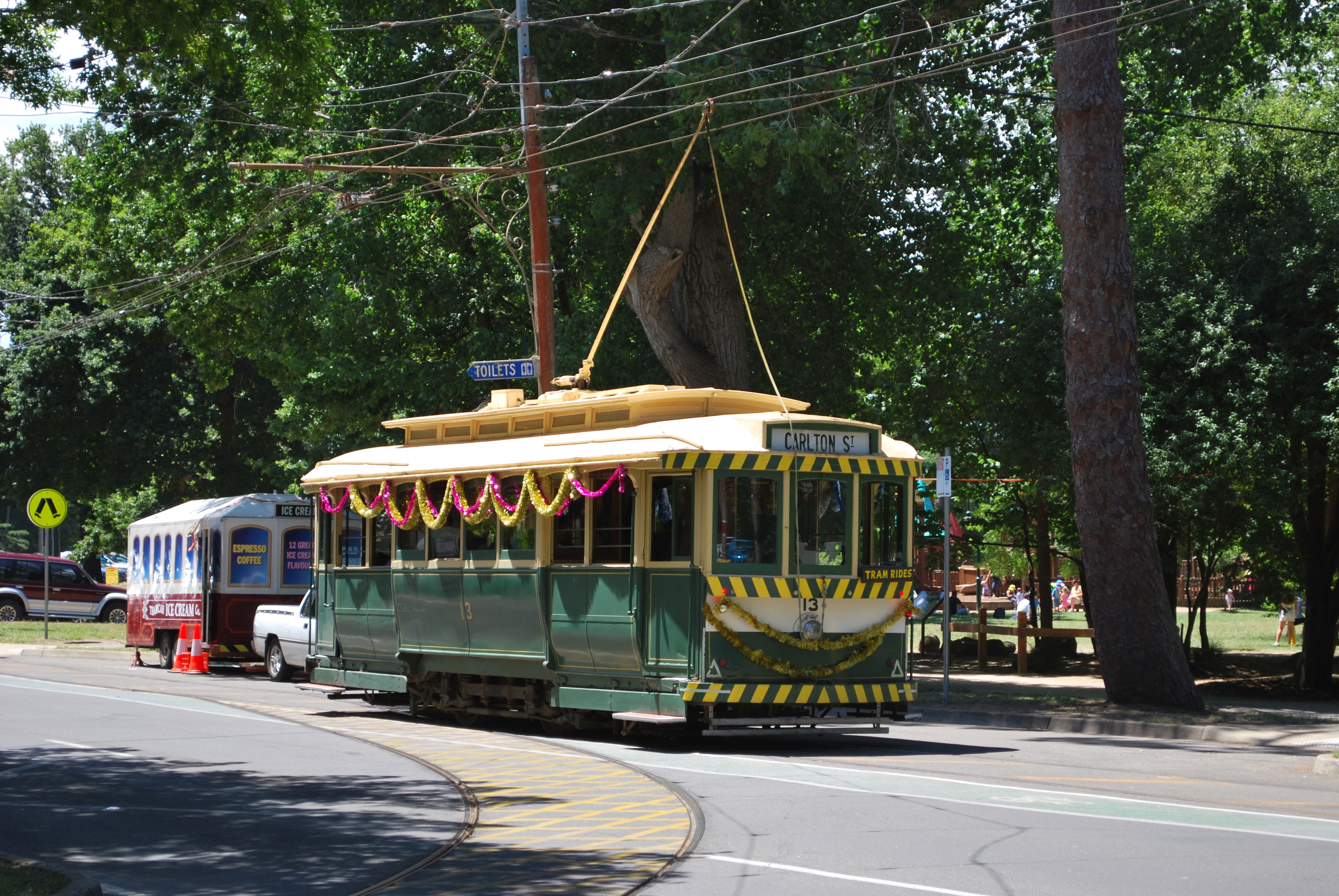
No.13

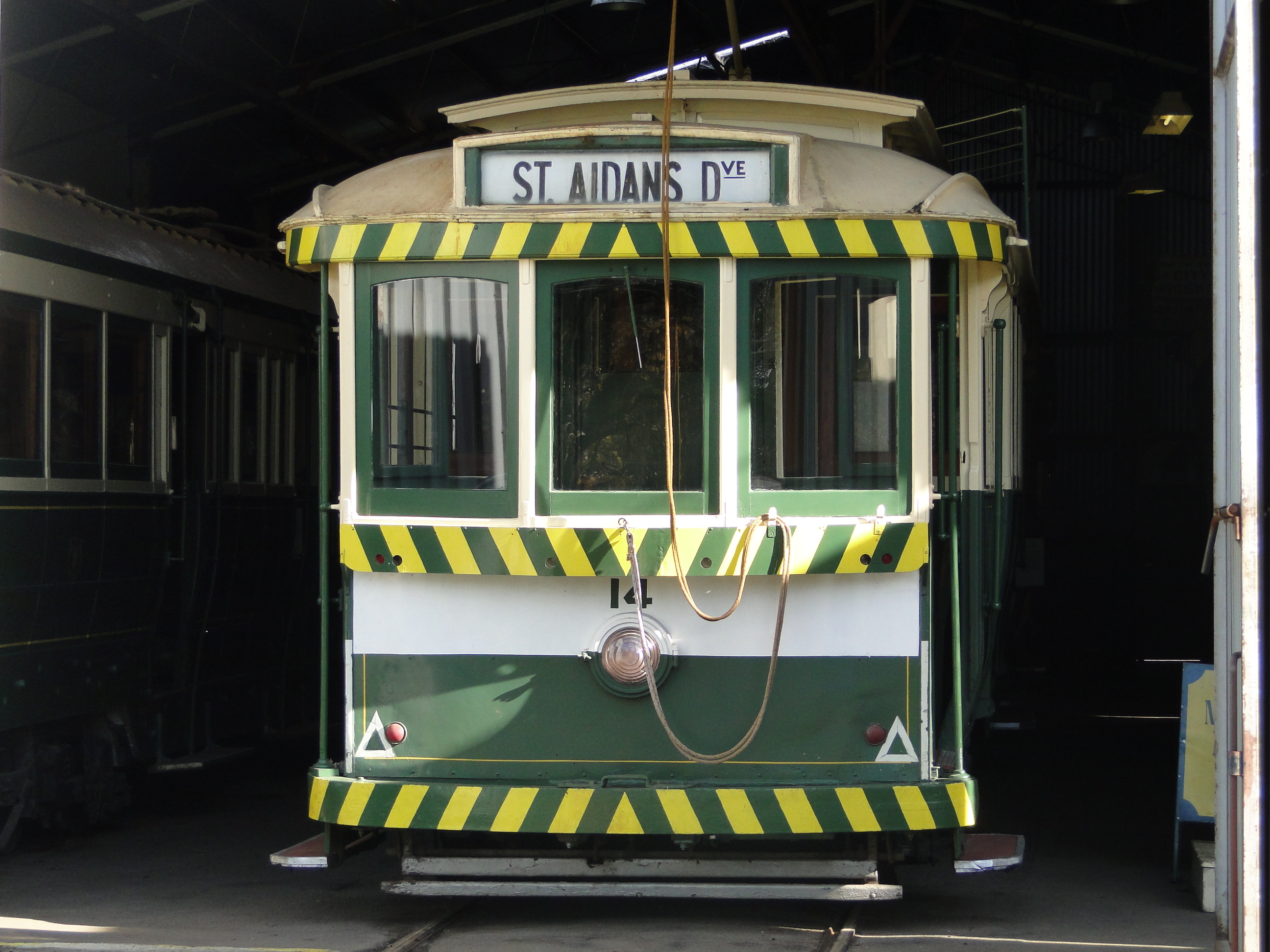
No.14

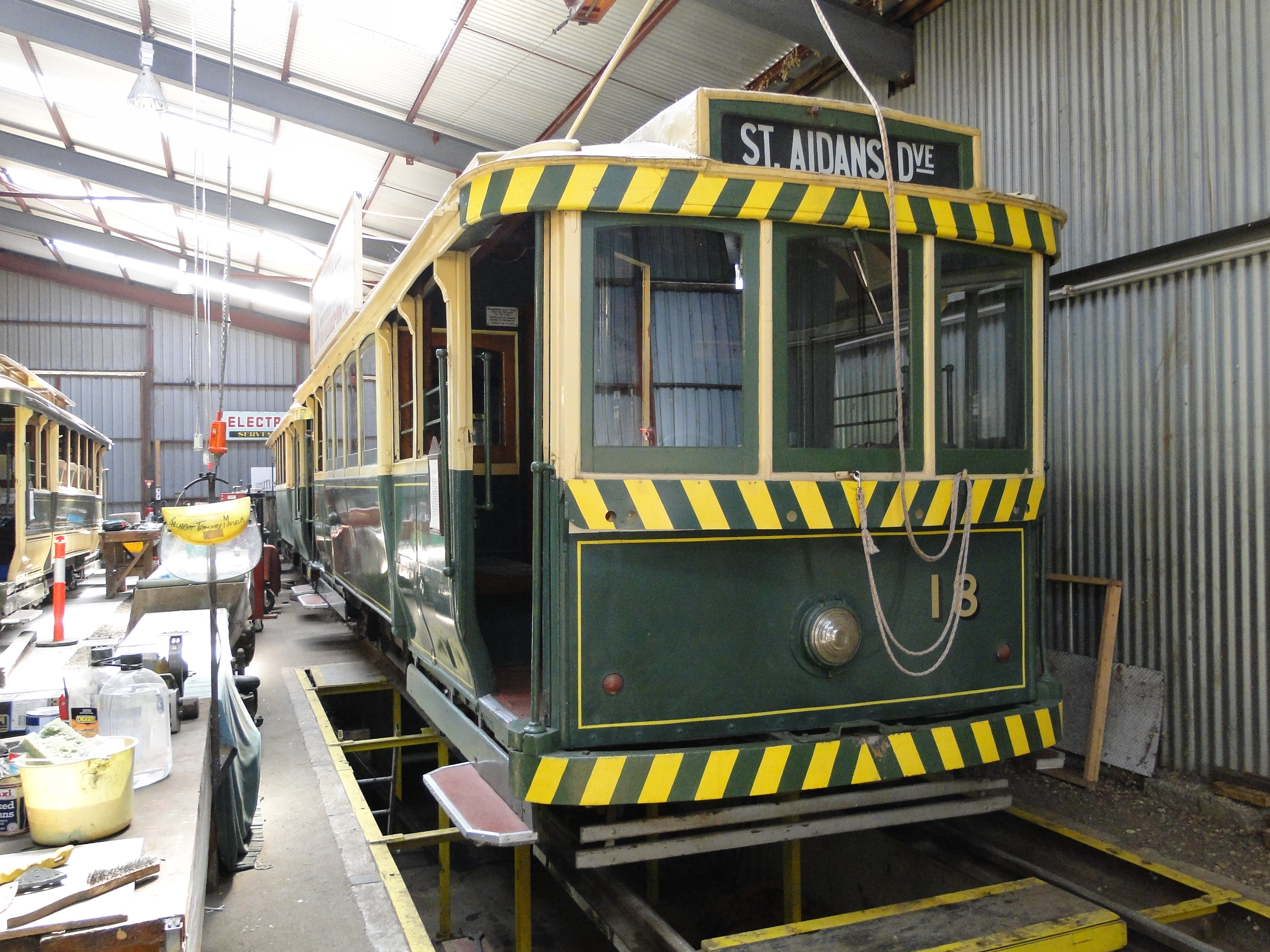
No.18

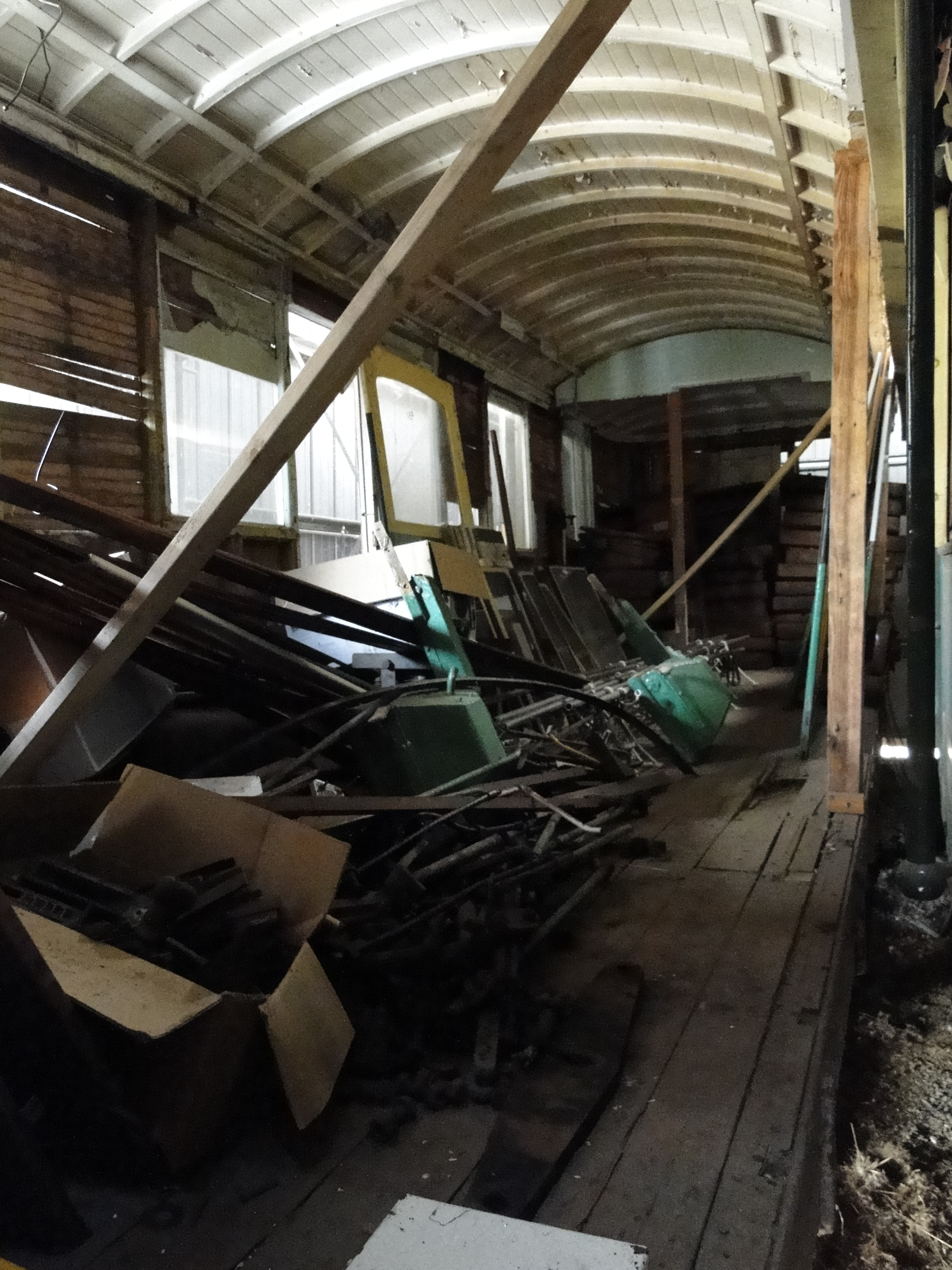
No. 21

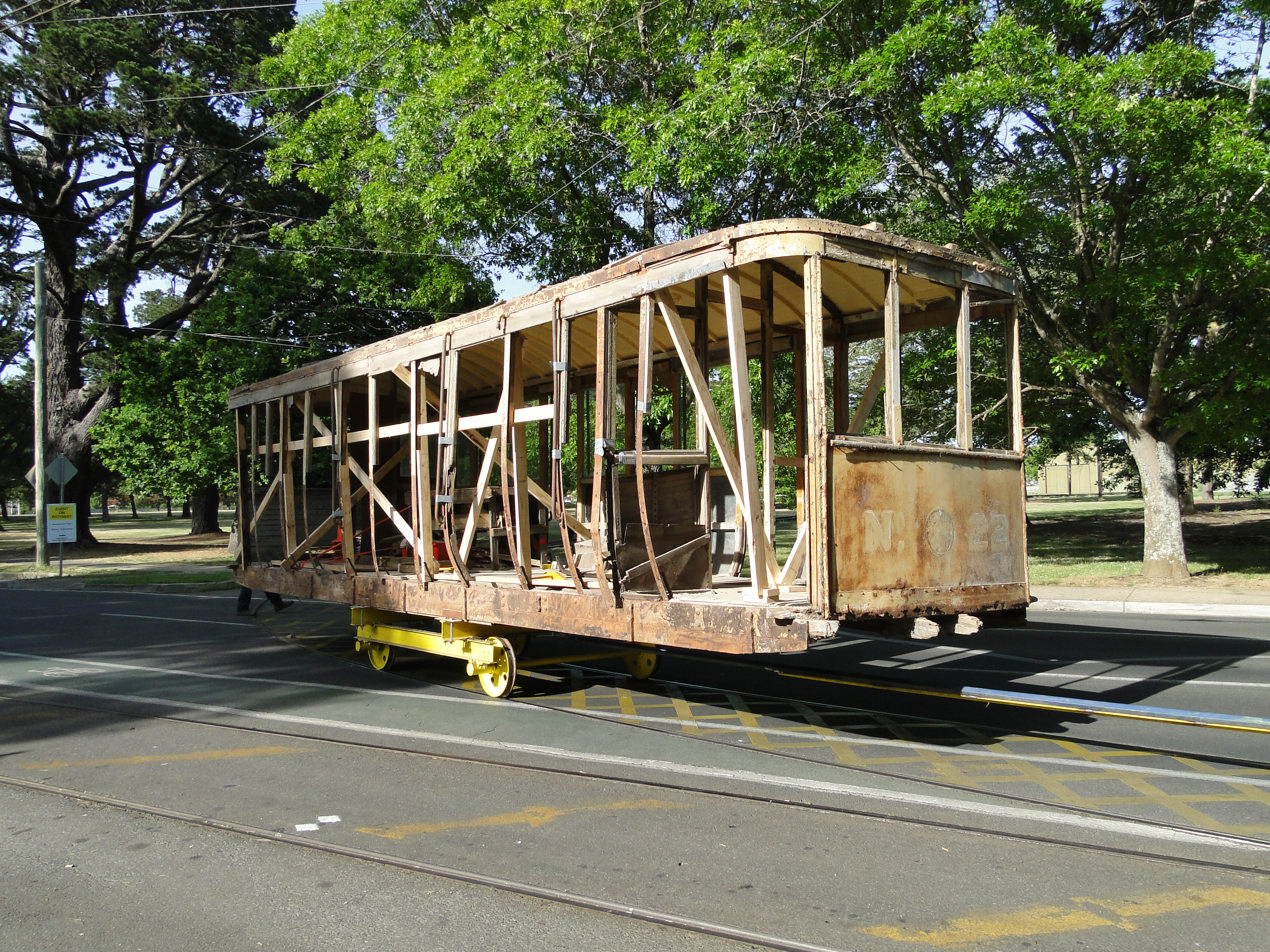
No. 22

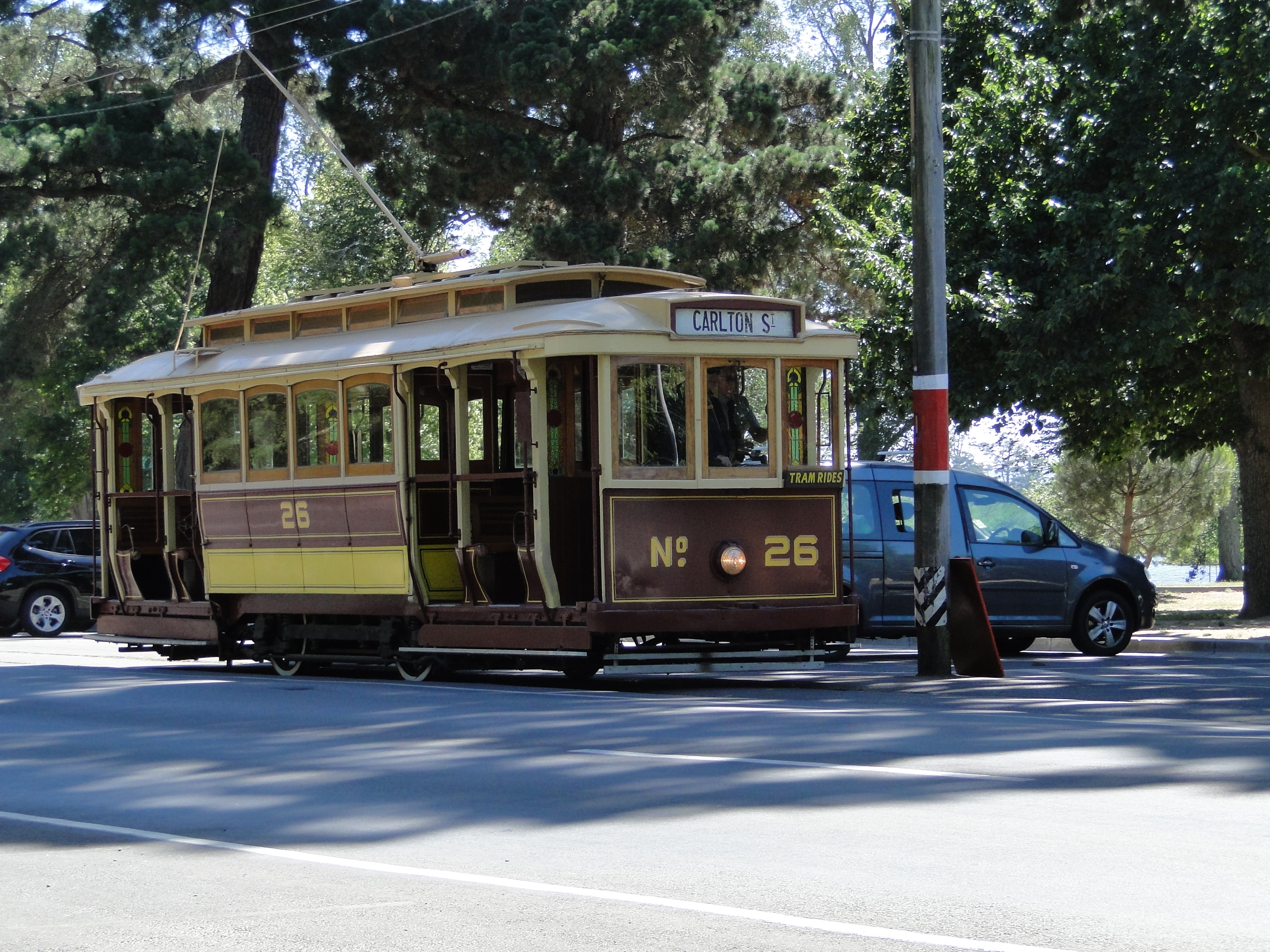
No.26

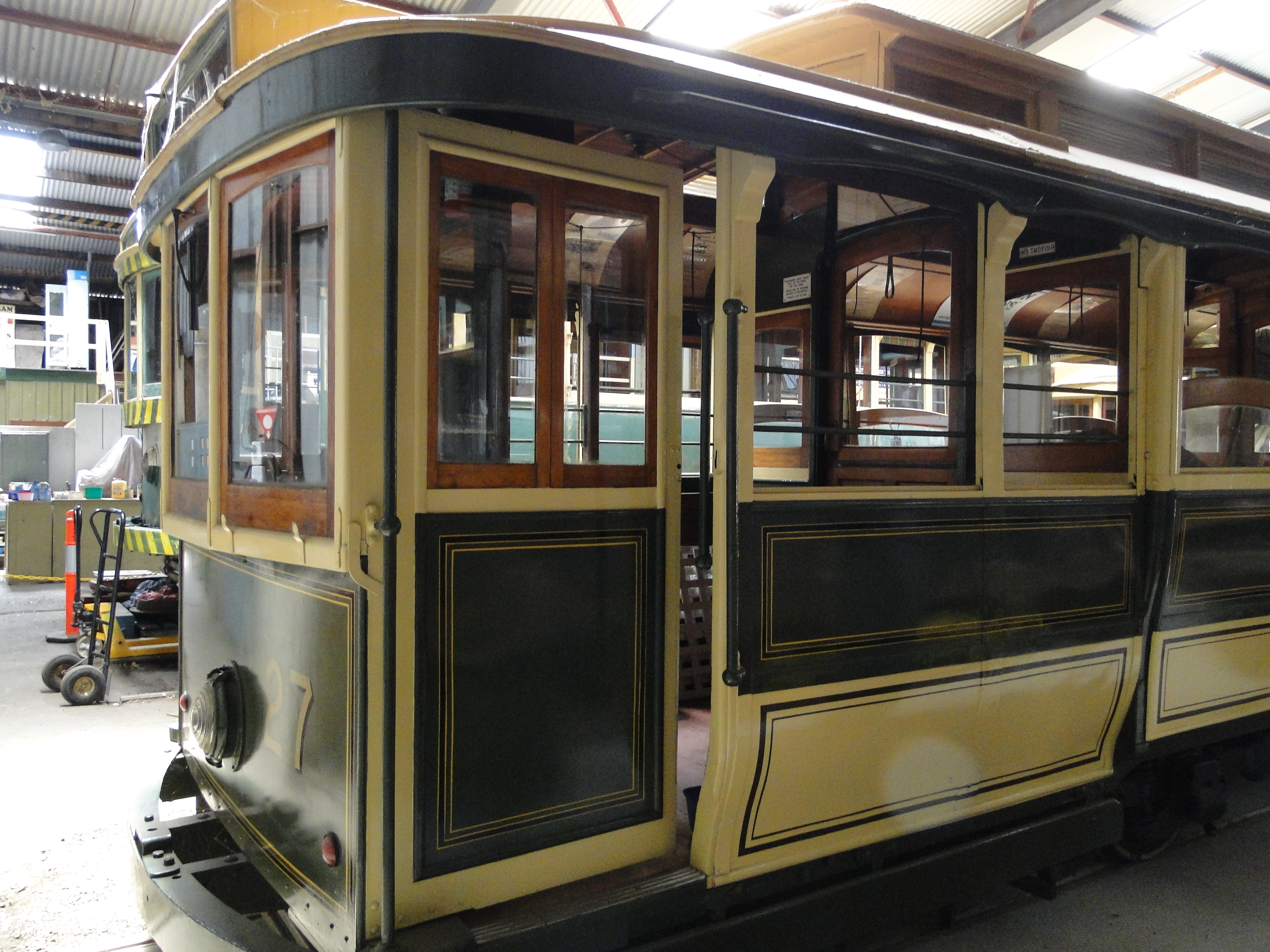
No. 27

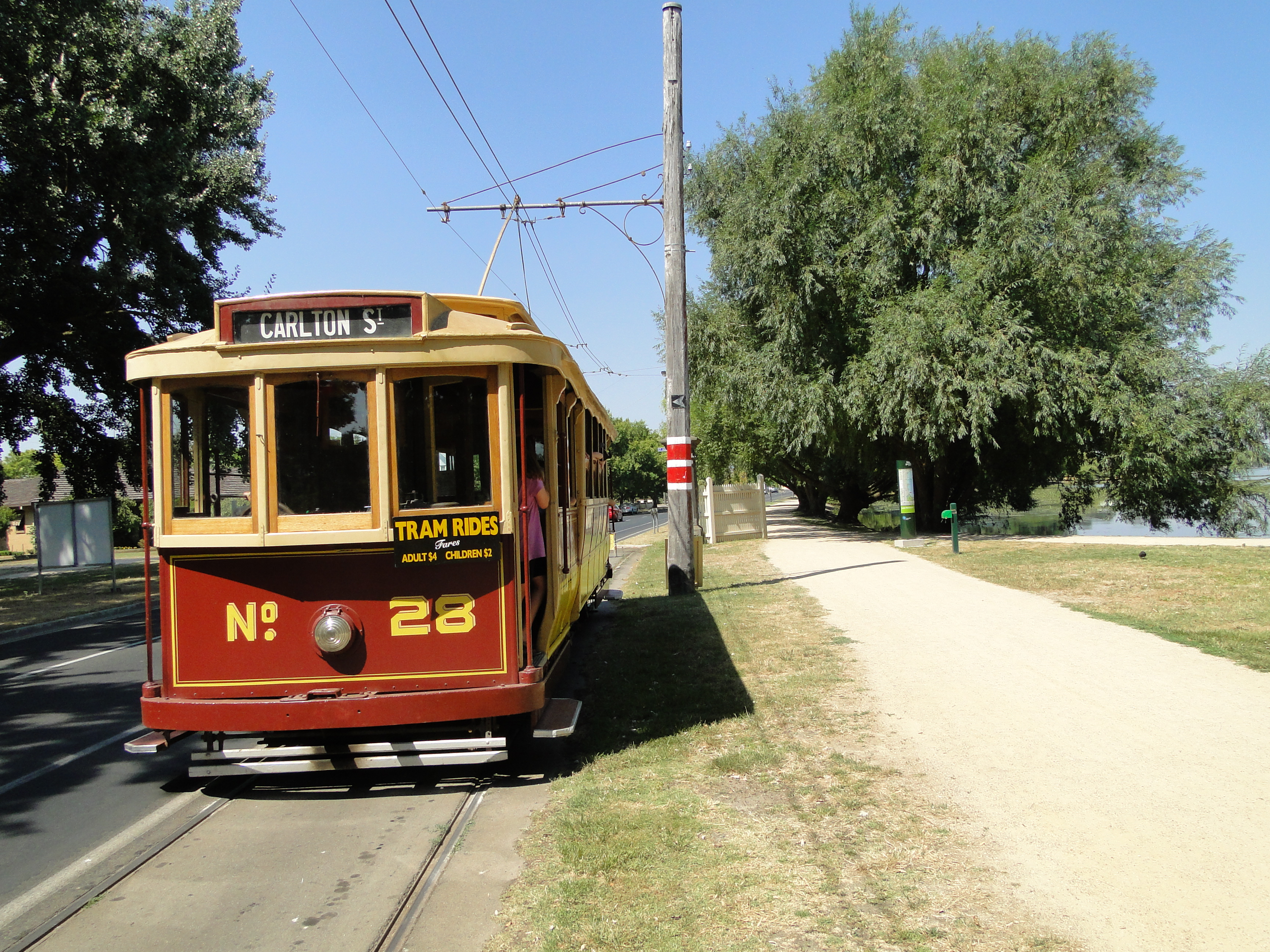
No. 28

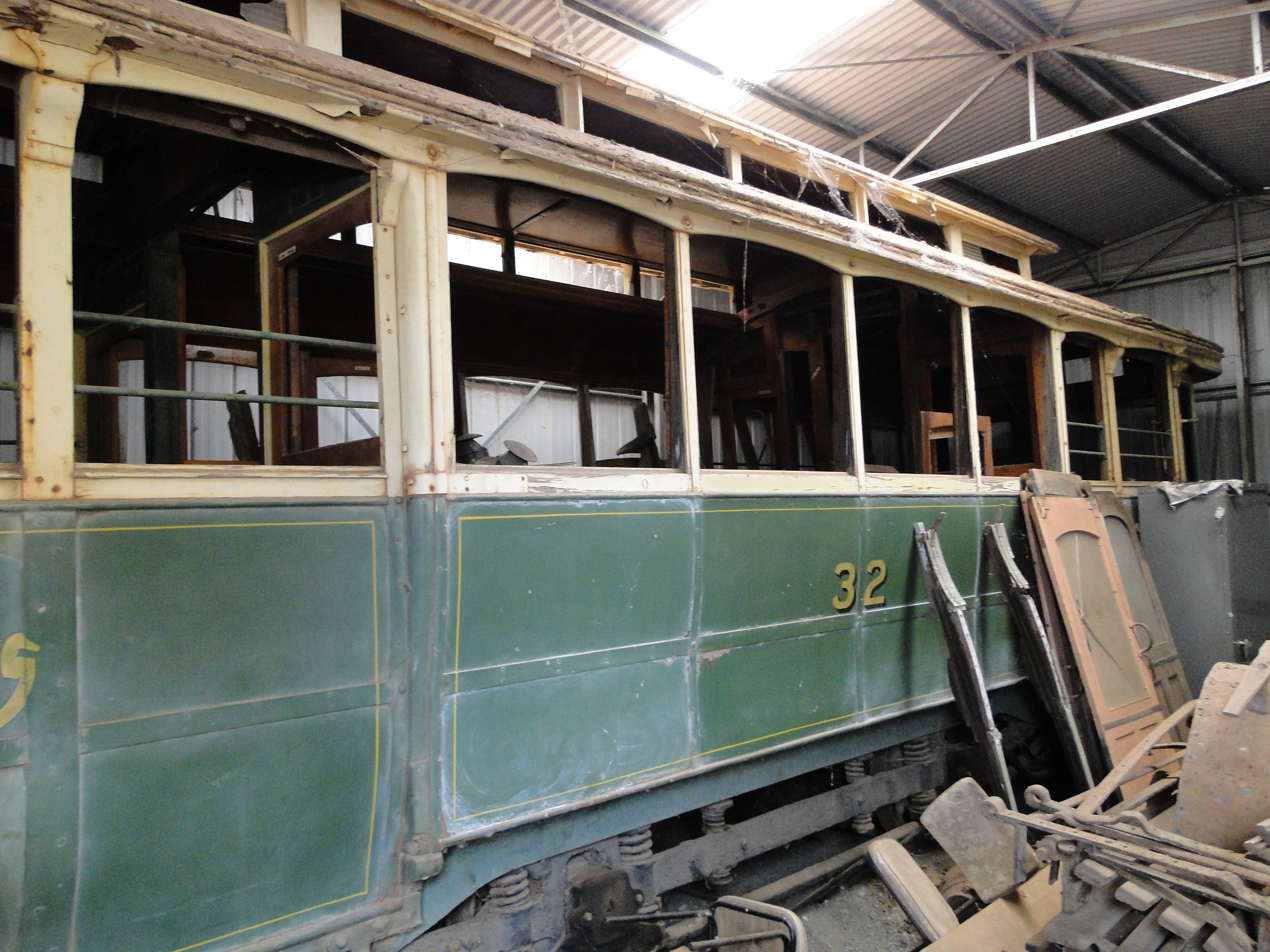
No. 32

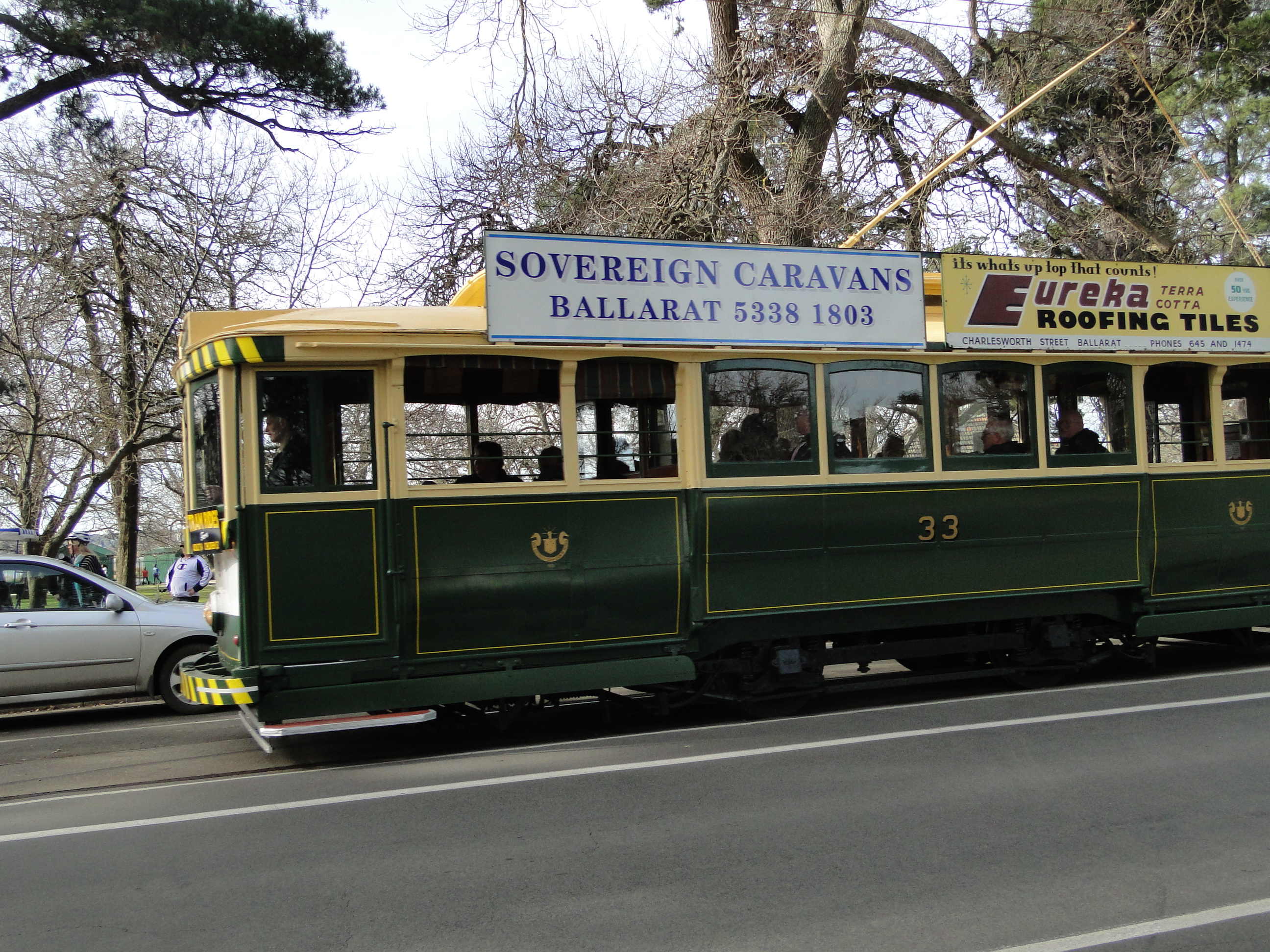
No.33

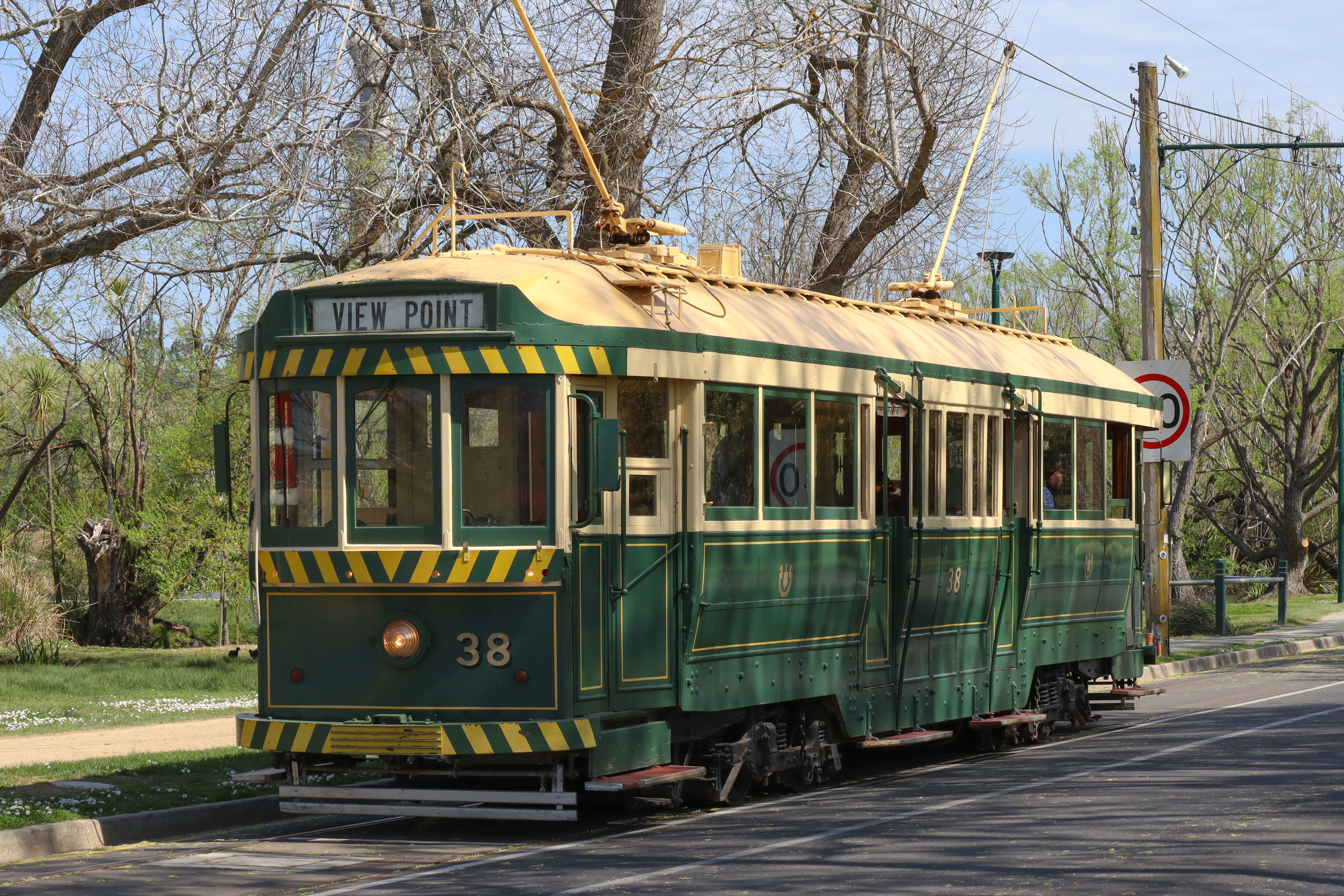
No.38

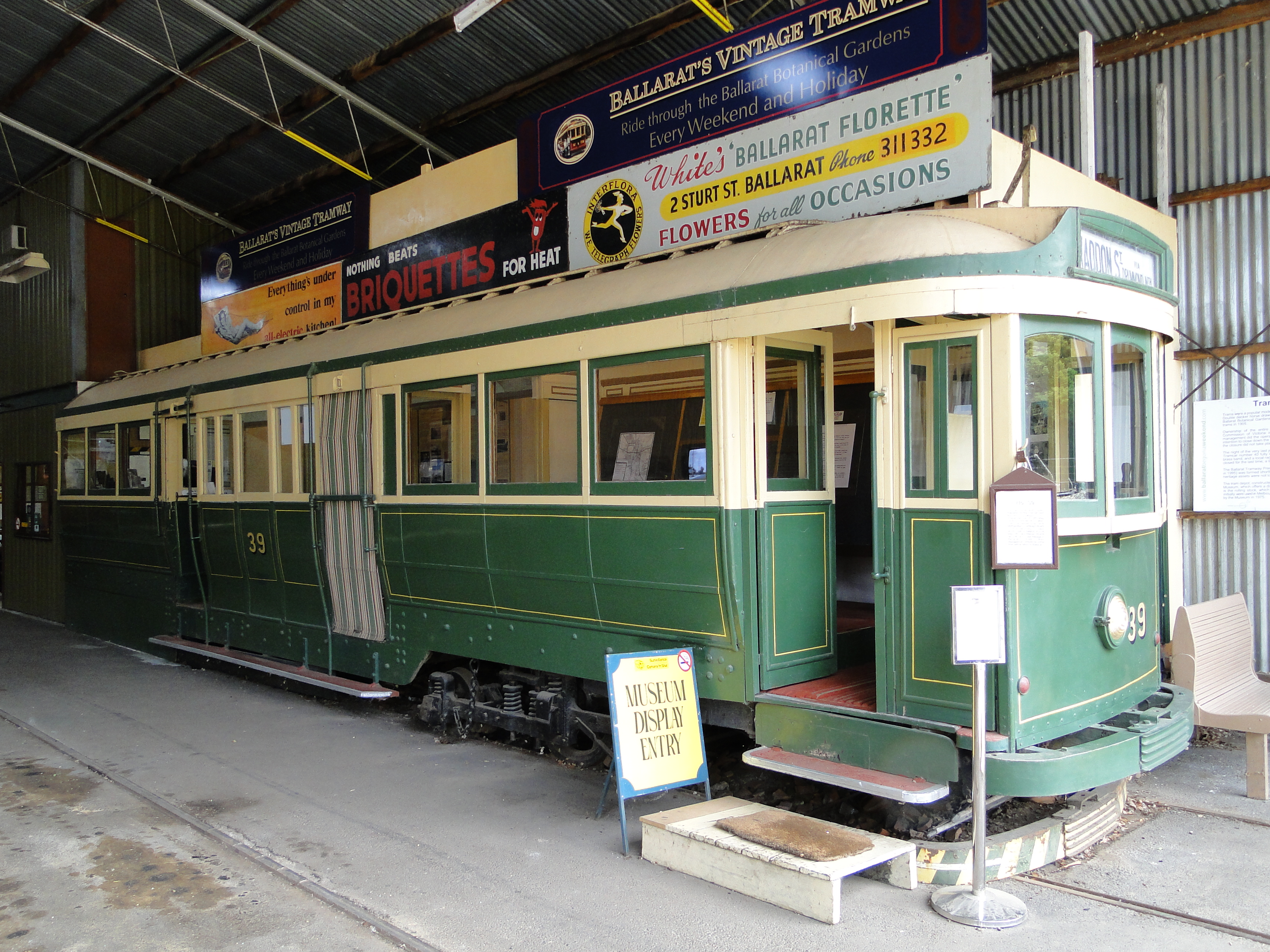
No.39

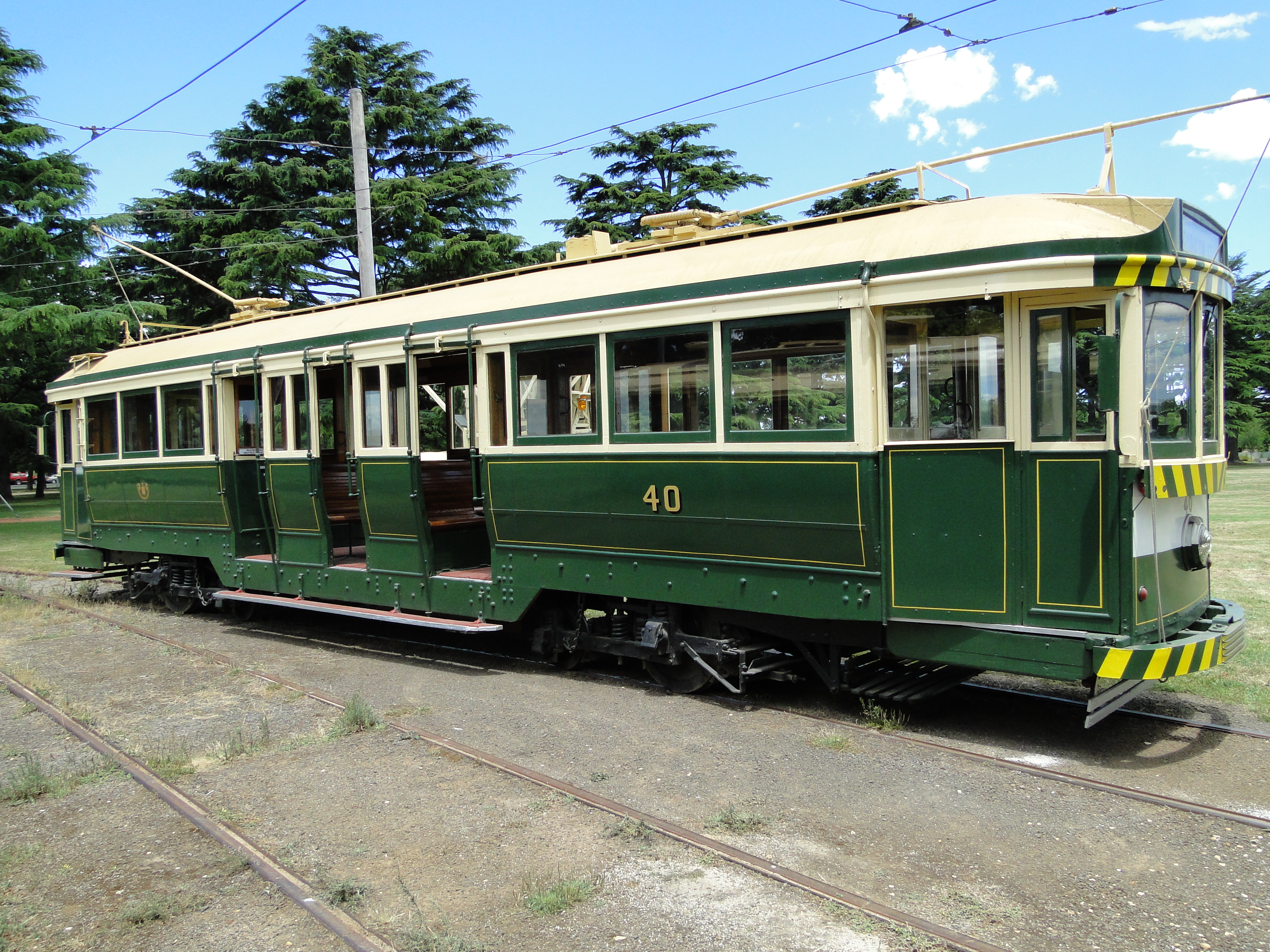
No. 40

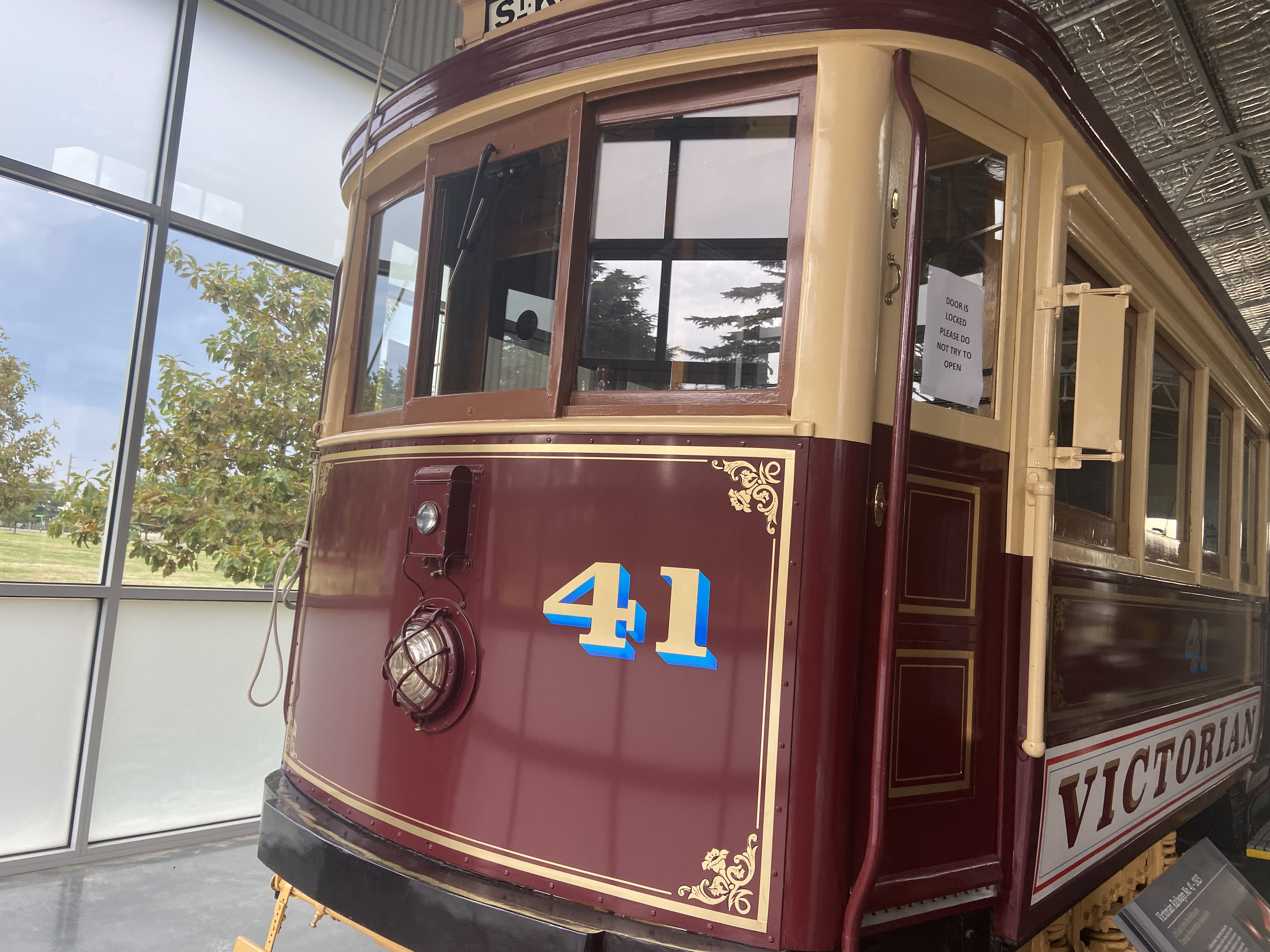
No. 41

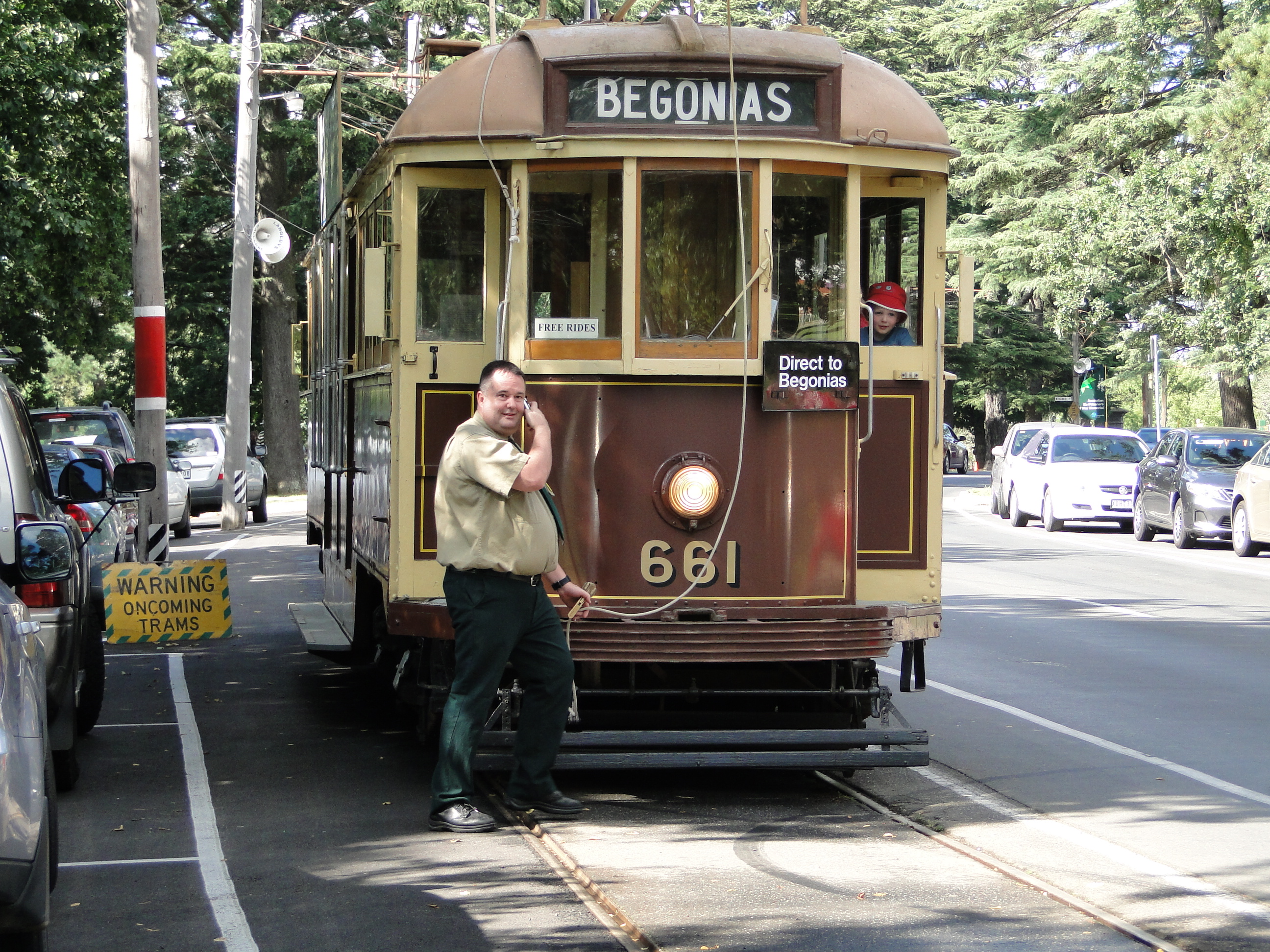
No.661

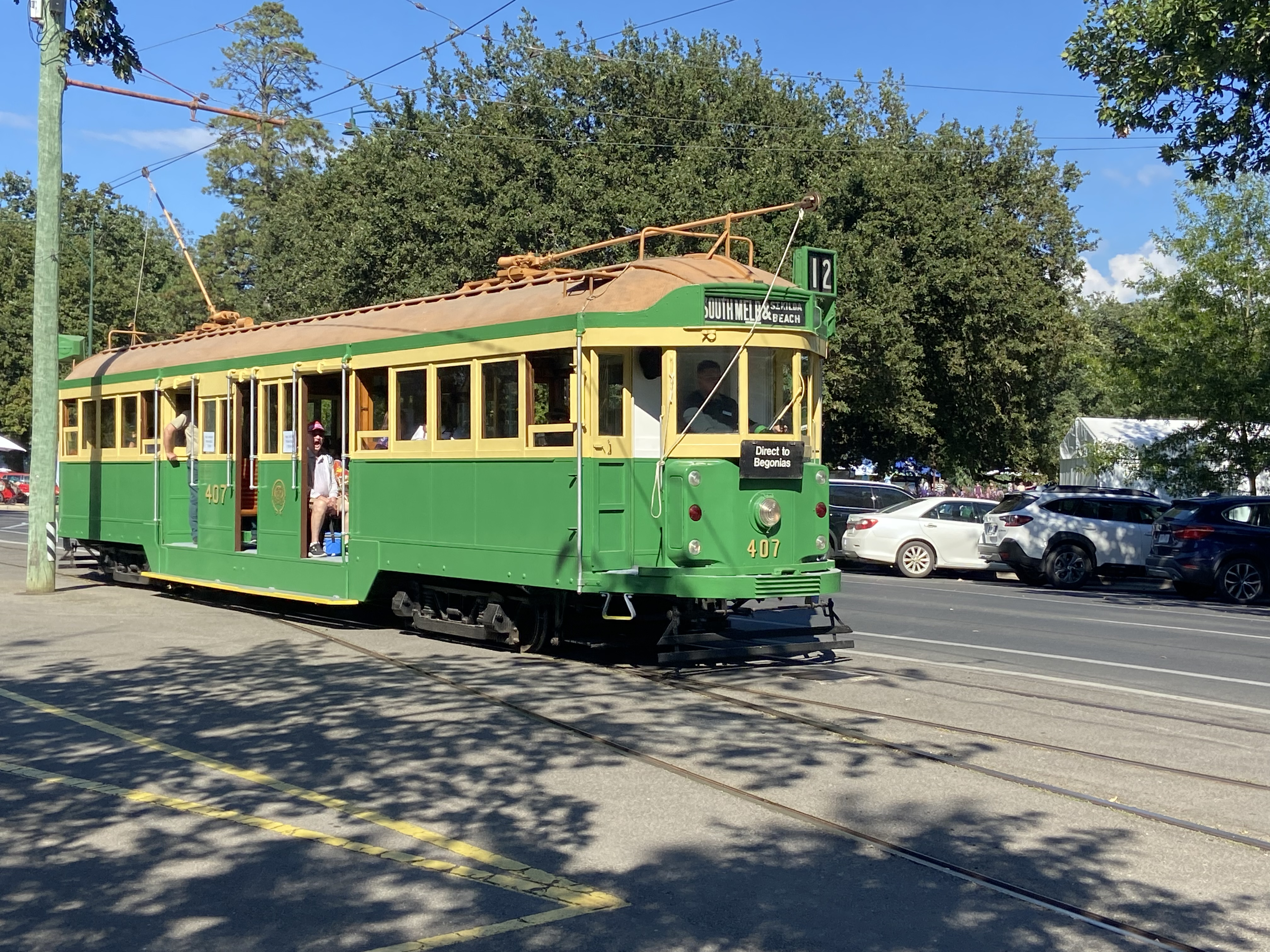
No. 407

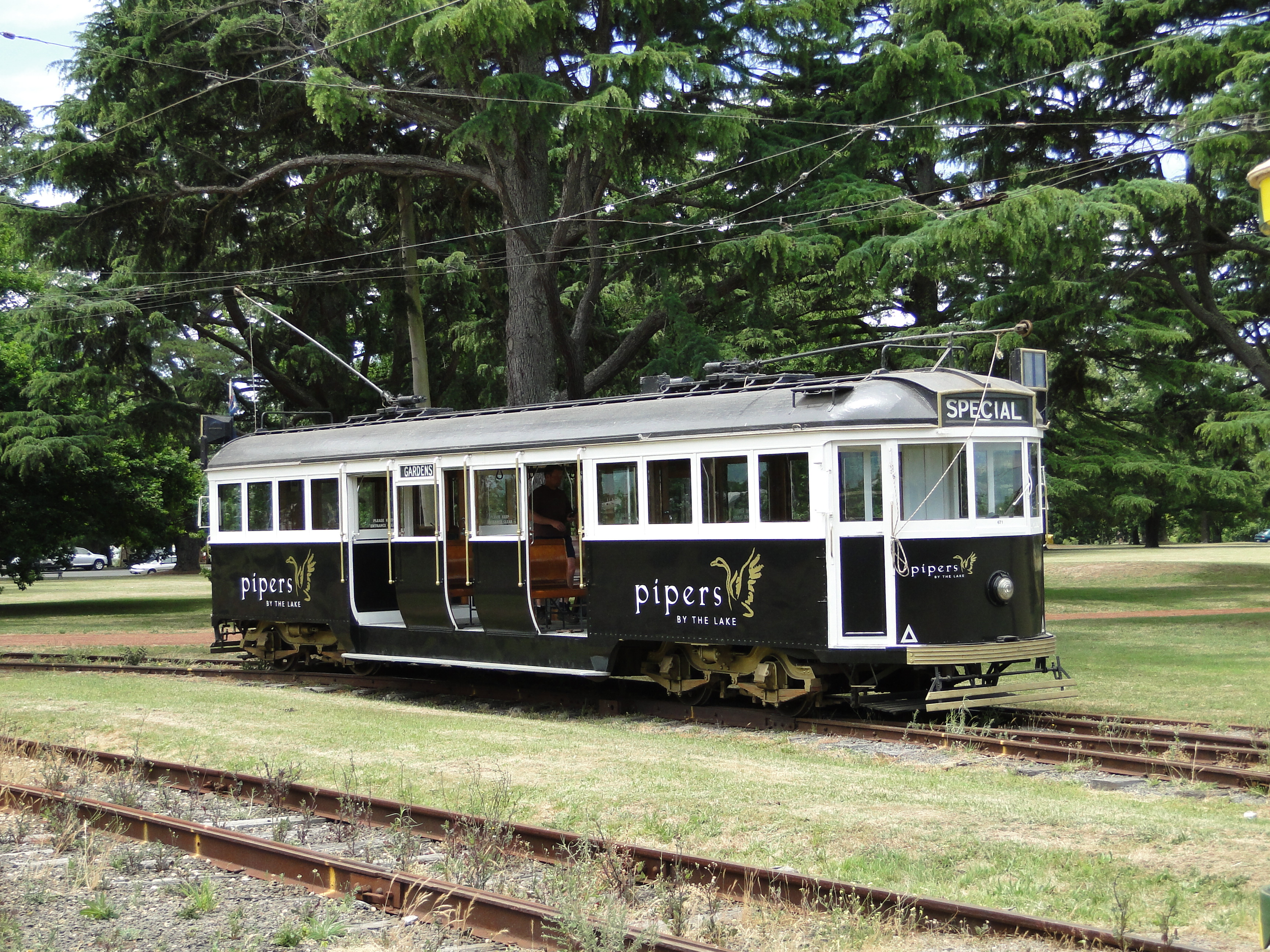
No. 671

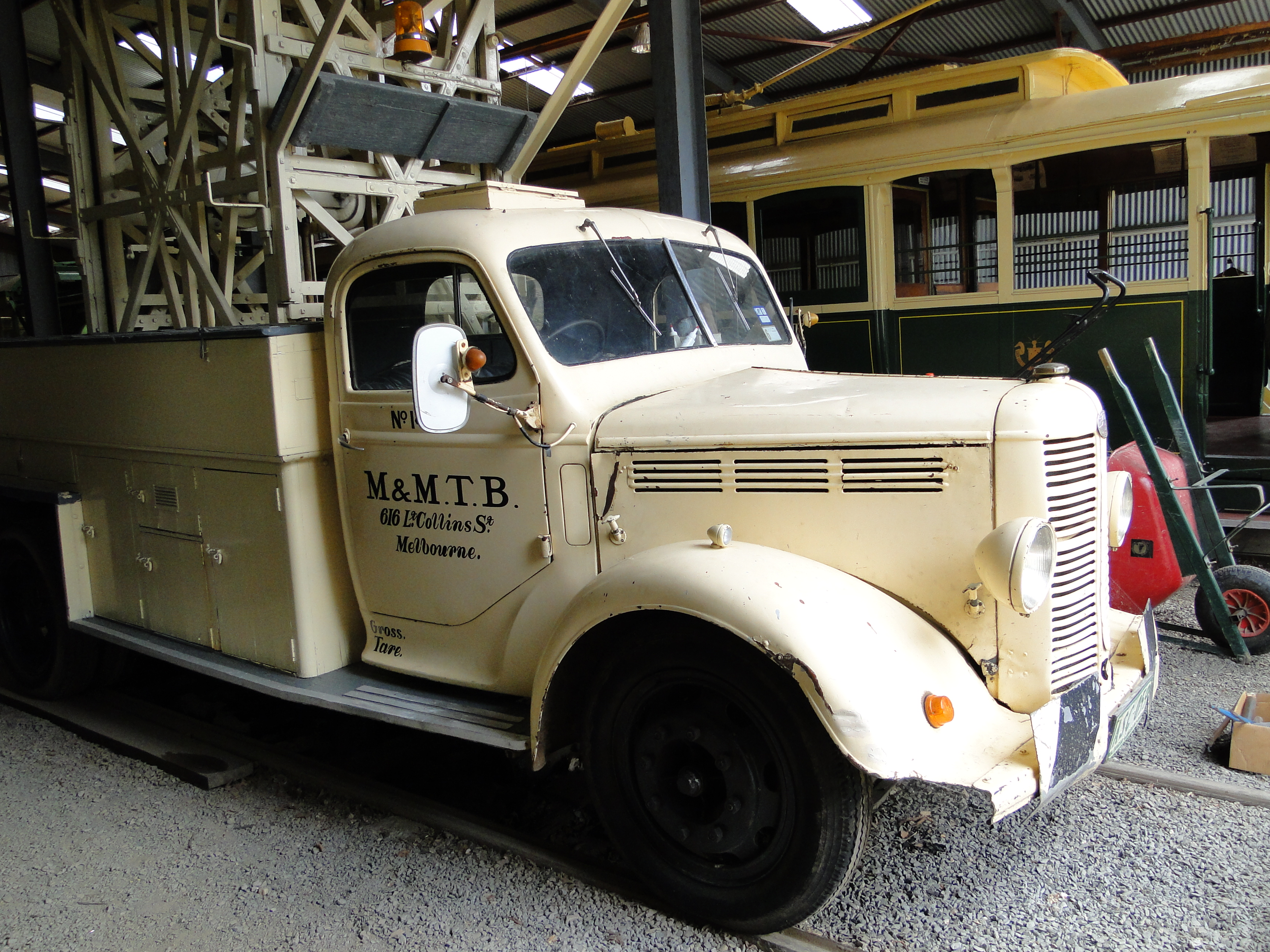
1949 Bedford truck

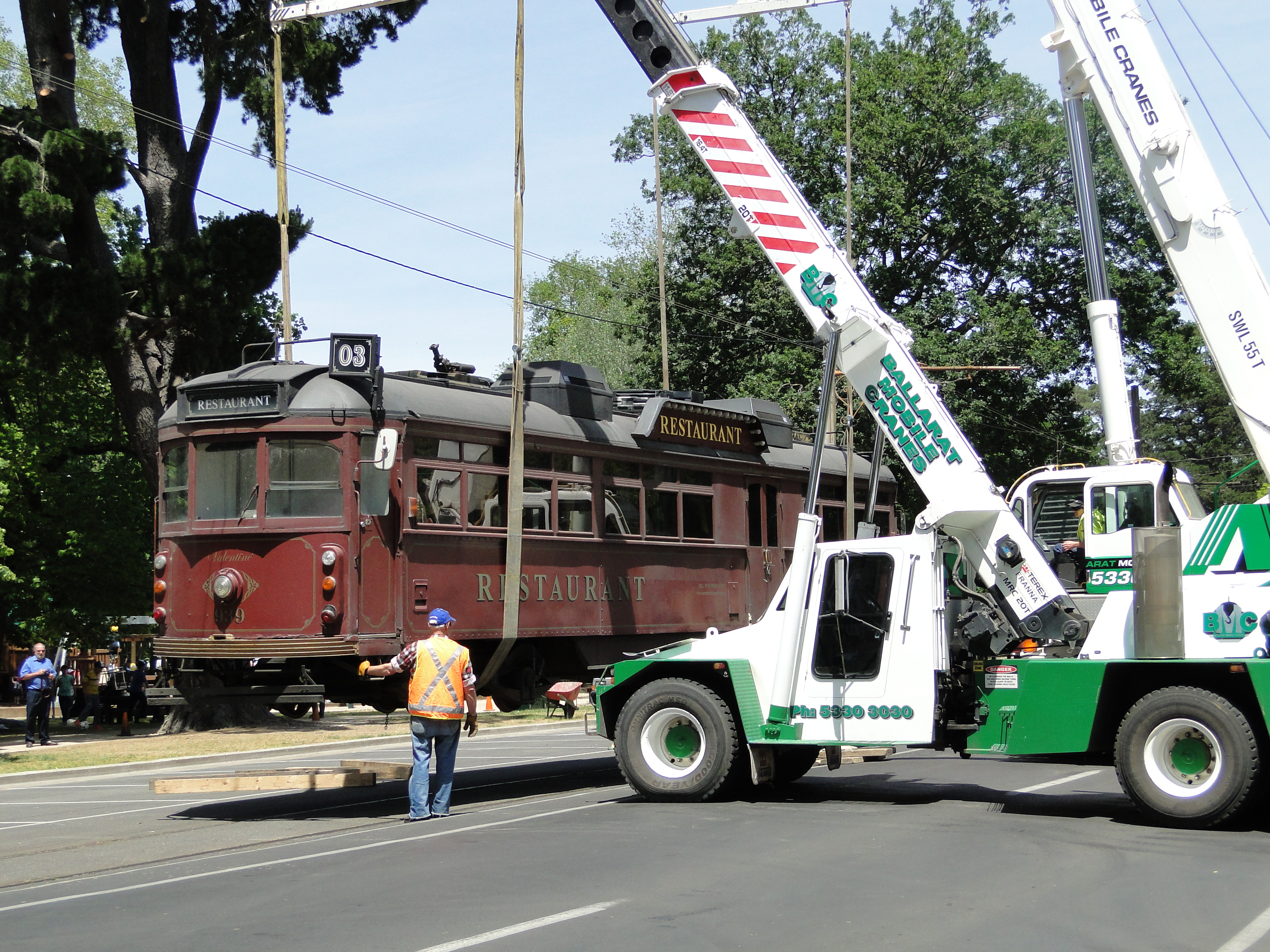
No. 939

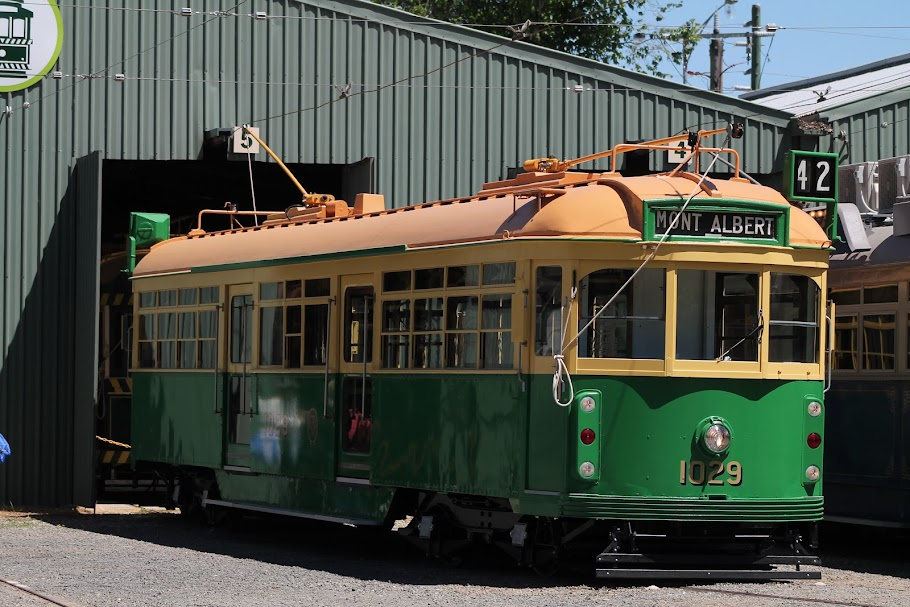
No. 1029

The Ballarat Tramway Museum also has a 1952 Bedford truck, with a tower to access the overhead wires. This was originally used in Sydney, and brought to Ballarat by the SEC in 1961. The truck is on display in the Museum display building in unrestored condition.

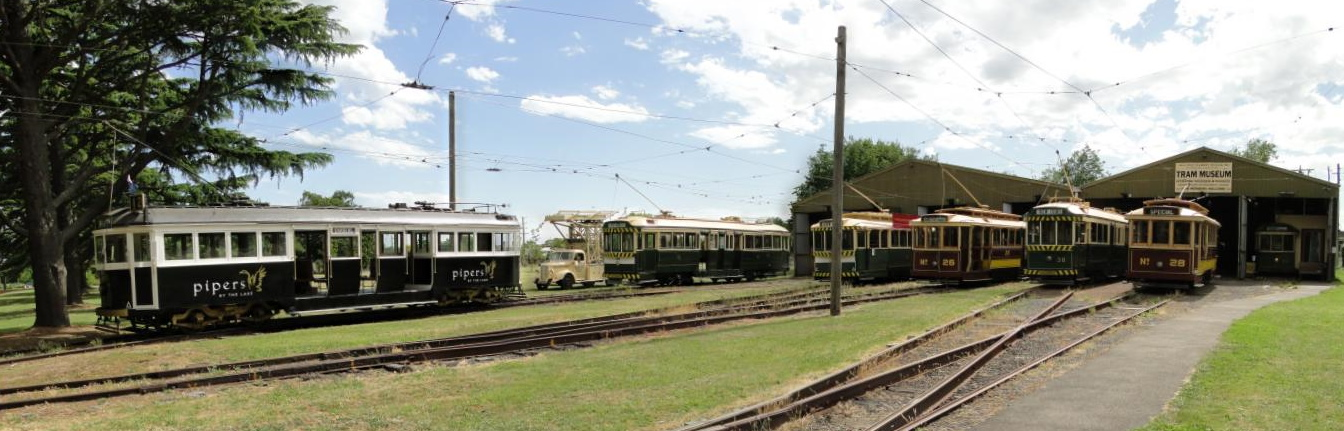

== See also ==
- Trams in Ballarat
- Trams in Geelong
