= Center for International Business Education and Research =

Centers for International Business Education and Research
- Abbreviation: CIBER
- Formation: 1988
- Region served: United States
- Parent organization: U.S. Department of Education
- Budget: $10,960,000 in 2008
- Website: us-ciberweb.org

The Centers for International Business Education and Research (CIBER) are resources for international business education in the United States funded by through the United States Department of Education.

== History ==
The centers were established in 1988 as part of the Omnibus Foreign Trade and Competitiveness Act of 1988. As part of the legislation, CIBERs are mandated to provide six specific services among their services.

== CIBERS ==
There are CIBERs at 17 universities in the United States.

- Brigham Young University
- Florida International University
- George Washington University
- Georgia Institute of Technology
- Georgia State University
- Indiana University
- Loyola Marymount University
- Michigan State University
- San Diego State University
- Temple University
- Texas A&M University
- U.S. Department of Education
- University of Colorado at Denver
- University of Maryland
- University of South Carolina
- University of Washington

== See also ==
- Business Technology Management
- National Negro Business League
