= Benefitive treasury measure =

In economics, the benefitive treasury measure (BTM) is an economic indicator that attempts to correlate a relationship between immigration and government tax receipts/government spending; put more simply, it is cost-benefit analysis of immigration on a macroeconomic scale. Originally coined in a policy report by G. Ing and R. McGowan of the Liberal Democrat Policy Research Unit, it was later popularised by the BBC's Business Editor, Robert Peston, during the late-2000s recession, in reference to the British Conservative Party's proposal for a cap on inwards migration, referred to as the "immigrant cap".

BTM analysis typically takes one of two forms. The first, growth analysis or 'absolute BTM', charts the net benefits and net costs of total inward migration occurring within the last 12 months (for example, increased welfare payments, tax receipts, and social unrest).

The second form of BTM analysis, 'Schengen BTM', has its parametres limited to immigration originating from European Union member states. Schengen BTM is unique in that it as much a political tool as an economic one, having originated from the research unit of a British political party.

The result of BTM analysis is displayed as BTM points, with each point corresponding to 0.01% of economic growth, relative to real GDP; for example, 4 on the BTM scale would suggest annual economic growth of 0.04% (real terms) within an economy, directly resultant of the previous year's net immigration. -4, in contrast, would indicate a contraction of −0.04%, perhaps as a result of social disorder, falling productivity or some other cause.

These factors may be described as benefitive treasury indicators, the socio-economic factors used to predict and calculate the annual BTM. BTI ranges from additional key worker housing construction costs, increases in law and order expenditure (as a result of additional need for social cohesion initiatives in deprived areas), to rises in the level of social security outpayments.

== History ==
In 1985, the member states of the European Union ratified the Schengen Agreement, a quasi-Treaty that abolished the vast majority of border controls within the so-called Schengen Area. This process enabled freedom of labour movement across the Schengen Zone, in the spirit of furthering a Common Market and a free trade area.

The long-term effects of the Schengen Agreement are not yet clear and are still subject to some debate, with British Eurosceptics pointing to "unprecedented" immigration figures as evidence of unintended consequences. The 2004 enlargement of the EU only fanned this debate; particularly-eurosceptic member states became even more concerned that they would not be able to weather the impacts of both increased immigration, and emigration, on their respective economies. Benefitive treasury measure, to try to calm fears by correlating with growth patterns, was a response from the Liberal Democrats, the UK's primary integrationist party, who cooperated with EU researchers work on a preliminary assessment of the effect of the free movement of labour on each member state.

== See also ==
- Economic effects of immigration
