= Borough of Sebastopol =

Coordinates: 37°34′S 143°51′E

Borough of Sebastopol Victoria
- The Borough of Sebastopol as at its dissolution in 1994
- Population: 7,800 (1992)
  - Density: 1,025/km^{2} (2,655/sq mi)
- Established: 1864
- Area: 7.61 km^{2} (2.9 sq mi)
- Council seat: Sebastopol
- Region: Grampians
- County: Grenville

The Borough of Sebastopol was a local government area about 4 kilometres (2 mi) south of the regional city of Ballarat, Victoria, Australia. The borough covered an area of 7.61 square kilometres (2.9 sq mi), and existed from 1864 until 1994.

Sebastopol was incorporated as a borough on 1 October 1864. On 6 May 1994, the Borough of Sebastopol was abolished, and along with the City of Ballaarat, the Shire of Ballarat, and parts of the Shires of Bungaree, Buninyong, Grenville and Ripon, was merged into the newly created City of Ballarat.

== Population ==
Year	Population
1954	3,265
1958	3,480*
1961	4,663
1966	4,966
1971	5,268
1976	5,941
1981	6,462
1986	7,011
1991	7,527

* Estimate in the 1958 Victorian Year Book.
