= Business Technology Management =

Trans-disciplinary research area and professional discipline in business administration

Business Technology Management (BTM) is an emerging trans-disciplinary research area and professional discipline in business administration. It is a next-gen program offered at only a selected few Business Schools. The program aims to bridge the gap between Management and Information Technology.

== Overview ==
Potentially building upon other business disciplines, such as: product management, project management, data science, management information systems (MIS) and/or technology management, and innovation management (TIM), it seeks to provide an integrated framework for the strategic use of data and technology and the digital transformation of organizations.

== Development ==
BTM is evolving similarly to other research areas in business, e.g., professional disciplines of change management (CM), leadership, and management consulting, developed from foundations in organizational behavior (OB), strategic management (SM), operations management (OM), and project management (PM).

In Canada, as of right now, Business Technology Management is offered by the John Molson School of Business, Concordia University, Haskayne School of Business, University of Calgary, UBC Sauder School of Business, University of British Columbia, Ted Rogers School of Management, Toronto Metropolitan University and École des Sciences de la Gestion, Université du Québec à Montréal.
