= Yarrowee River =

Perennial river in Victoria, Australia

Yarrowee
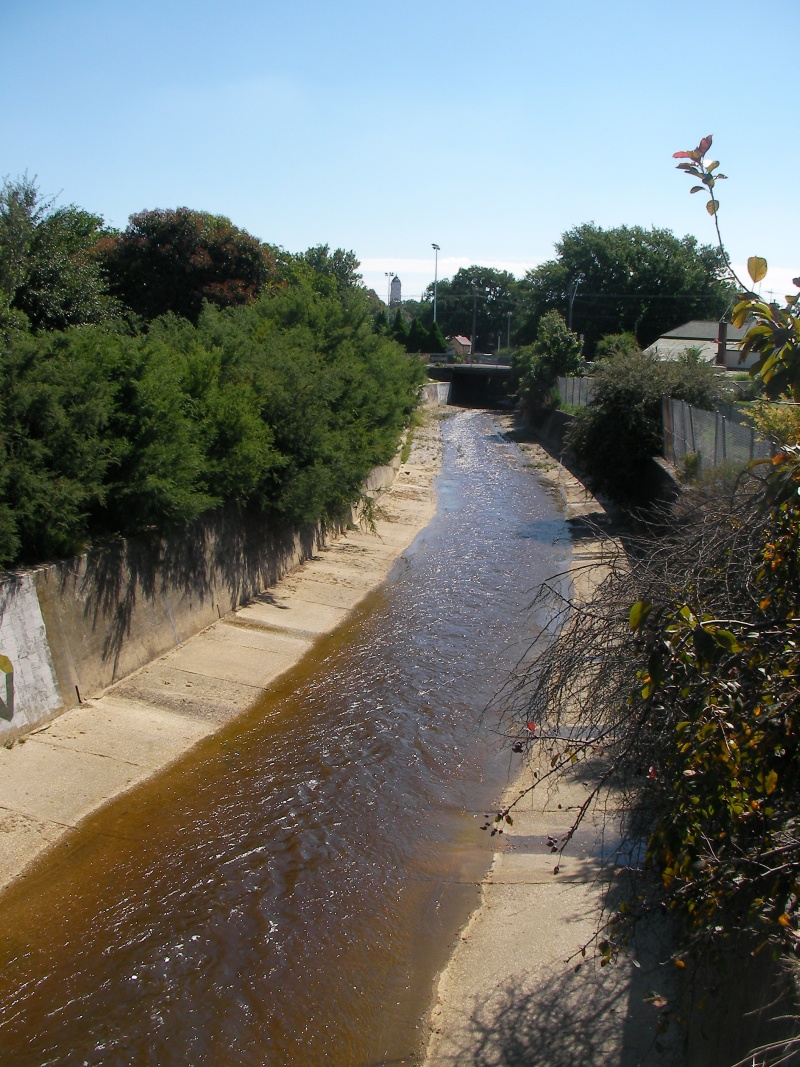
- View of the Yarrowee River between Black Hill and East Ballarat west toward Peel Street. The Ballarat railway station clock tower is visible in the distance

- Location of the Yarrowee River mouth in Victoria
- Etymology: Aboriginal Wathaurong: Yaramlok; From Yarrow Water
- Nickname: Yarrowee Creek

Location
- Country: Australia
- State: Victoria
- Region: Central Highlands
- City: Ballarat

Physical characteristics
- Source: Gong Gong Creek
  - location: Gong Gong
  - elevation: 520 m (1,710 ft)
- Mouth: Leigh River
  - location: Cambrian Hill, Victoria
  - coordinates: 37°37′48″S 143°49′54″E
  - elevation: 377 m (1,237 ft)
- Length: 43 km (27 mi)

Basin features
- River system: Corangamite catchment
- Tributaries
  - left: Warrenheip Creek, Little Bendigo Creek, Canadian Creek, Redan Creek
  - right: Gnarr Creek, Winter Creek, Ross Creek (Victoria)

The Yarrowee River (or Yaramlok in the Aboriginal language) is a perennial river of the Corangamite catchment, in the Central Highlands region of the Australian state of Victoria.

== Location and features ==
The Yarrowee is a major tributary and catchment of the Barwon River. The river's origins are in the hills at Gong Gong, and it is notable for passing through the settlement of Ballarat and crossing the City of Ballarat local government area before becoming the Leigh River in the vicinity of Cambrian Hill and Golden Plains Shire.

The river is a secondary water supply for the city of Ballarat. Its catchment contains several tributaries in the urban area including Gnarr Creek, Gong Gong Creek, Little Bendigo Creek and Warrenheip in the north eastern reaches and; Redan Creek, Canadian Creek and Buninyong Creek in the southern reaches. The river flows through the Ballarat suburbs of Gong Gong, Nerrina, Brown Hill, Black Hill, Ballarat East, Ballarat Central, Golden Point, Redan, Mount Pleasant, Sebastopol, Mount Clear, Magpie and Cambrian Hill. Tributaries in the catchment run through most other Ballarat suburbs and the river also marks the border between several suburbs.

It is a seasonal watercourse with highly varying levels of flow, often swelling in the winter months and prone to flash flooding, though it is not unusual for its flow (and that of its tributaries) to at times stop altogether.

== History and toponymy ==
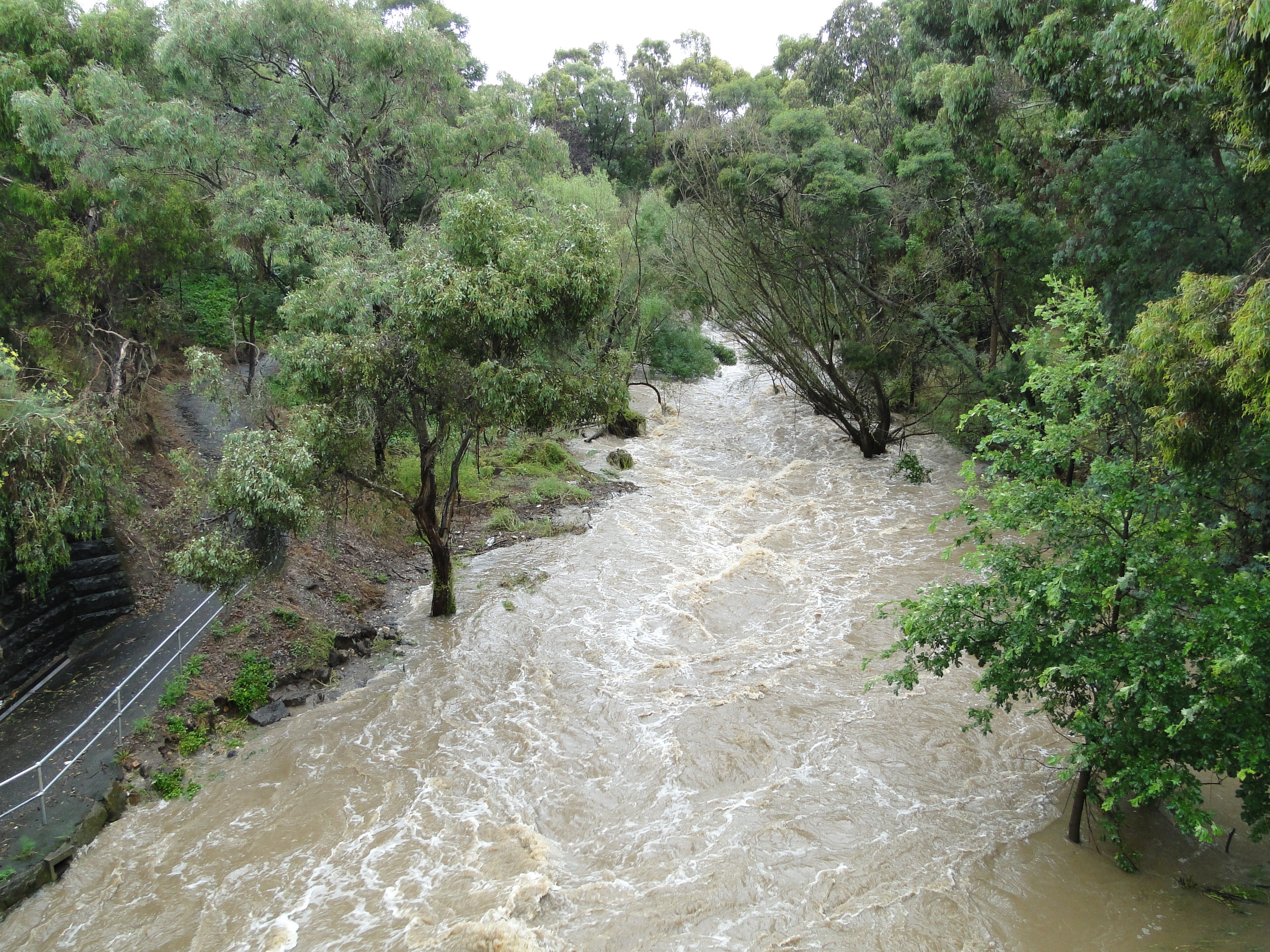
Yarrowee River in flood in Redan, January 2011

Prior to the European settlement of Australia, the river was an important place for the Boro gundidj, a tribe of the Wathaurong Indigenous Australian people as they based themselves around its northern stretches. At the present-day site of Ballarat, the river was "three to four yards wide" and "clear and limpid... teeming with the native blackfish". In its natural state, it would flow until December, then become a chain of ponds until the autumn rains came.

The river was important to the first settlers (squatters) of the region, with William Cross Yuille establishing his home near the swamp that is now Lake Wendouree, that was an important part of the river's catchment. Bullock drivers, carrying loads to and from the distant stations, would camp at Ballarat above "a large permanent waterhole in the creek below, [where] the bullocks could be trusted not to stray far in the lush grasses of the creek flats".

The Ballarat gold rush brought dramatic changes to the river. It was used as a source of water for extensive placer mining. The first bridge, a crude wooden structure, was built in 1855 at the present site of Bridge Road in response to increasing coach traffic.

Indigenous inhabitants were driven away from the river by the increasing rush of new settlers. During the 1860s, much of the river and its tributaries were sealed as drains using quarried bluestone to prevent erosion and help mitigate frequent flooding. The river was known to flood in the early days. In 1869 a serious flood of the Yarrowee River put most of the lower section of the city including Bridge and Grenville Street underwater causing the loss of two lives. In 1877 the Gong Gong reservoir was built to alleviate flooding and to replace Lake Wendouree as the primary water source for Ballarat. By the turn of the century, the river had become heavily polluted during the early industrialisation of Ballarat.

During the 1960s, the river through the Ballarat CBD was re-routed, concreted and built over. As a result, it now forms an underground drain running under Grenville Street. Many other parts of the river also became wide and deep concrete stormwater drains. Several stretches of the river remain, however in its natural bush and parkland setting. Since the 1980s, major initiatives have been undertaken to restore the river's state and vegetation and several natural wetlands have also been re-established along its course. The river suffered flash flooding during the 2010 and the 2011 Victorian floods. A Victorian Government–funded A$1 million clean up of the river over three years was announced in July 2013; yet by May 2014 problems of sewage contamination remained a problem near Ballarat.

== Etymology ==
The first non-indigenous people in the area gave it the name Yuille's Creek after local pastoralist William Cross Yuille. It is believed that the name Yarrowee was derived from Yaramlok, the name given to the river by the Wathaurung people. According to historian Jennifer Barnes the Aboriginal word means "gum tree growing in water". Barnes also suggests that aborigines called the river "Nambrook". She cites historian Weston Bate who claimed that the Aboriginal word was "Yar-ar-way" and Arthur Jenkins who claims it was "Yarmlock". Barnes also suggests miners had referred to it as the "Wee Yarrow". The latter gives rise to alternative theories including a derivation of Yarrow Water, Scotland, attributed to the early Scottish settlers of the area.

== Environmental issues ==
Early 2022, several pollution reports were sent to EPA Victoria. The pollution was due to sediments running from a development site in Brown Hill, owned by Vista Estate Pty Ltd, towards the River causing a decline in water quality and risk for flora and fauna in the long term.

After more than ten months of actions deemed insufficient by EPA, the latter took Vista Estate Pty Ltd to the Supreme Court and the company has been issued an order to reinforce their control to minimise the risk of discharge of sediment into the river.

== Communities and bridge crossings along the river ==
There are many crossings over the Yarrowee River, including road, rail and pedestrian. Some additional roads allow passage through shallow sections of the river when the water levels are low.

Location	Bridge name	Comments/use	Image
Brown Hill		Daylesford-Ballarat Road	
Brown Hill		Hillview Road	
Brown Hill		Springs Road	
Brown Hill		Western Freeway	
Brown Hill		Brown Hill Hotel (pedestrian)	
Brown Hill		Ried Crt (Brown Hill Oval) (pedestrian)	
Brown Hill		Ainley Street, Brown Hill	
Nerrina		Stawell Street Nth	
Ballarat East / Ballarat Central		Oliver Street	
Ballarat East / Ballarat Central		Queen Street Nth (pedestrian)	
Ballarat East / Ballarat Central		Newman Street (pedestrian)	
Ballarat East / Ballarat Central		Princes Street, Black Hill	
Ballarat East / Ballarat Central		Nicholson Street, Black Hill	
Ballarat East / Ballarat Central		Peel Street, Black Hill	
Ballarat East / Ballarat Central		Eastern Oval (pedestrian)	
Ballarat East / Ballarat Central		Scott Parade	
Ballarat East / Ballarat Central		Serviceton railway line	
Ballarat East / Ballarat Central		Grenville Street	
Ballarat East / Ballarat Central		Grant Street	
Mt Pleasant		Hill Street	
Redan		Prest Street	
Sebastopol		Whitehorse Road bridge; built of concrete and steel in the 1920s; destroyed when central pole collapsed during January 2011 floods; rebuilt October 2011.	
Sebastopol		Docwra Street	
Magpie		Midland Highway	
