= Telecommunications Association (TelSoc) =

The Telecommunications Association (TelSoc), formerly known as the Telecommunication Society of Australia (TSA), has served the Australian telecommunications industry as its learned society since its initial formation as the Telegraph Electrical Society in 1874, in response to enthusiasm for the then new engineering science of electrical telegraphy. Since then, TelSoc has evolved in response to the industry's growth through successive phases of industry restructuring: the introduction of telephony by the private sector (1880); nationalization following Federation of Australia (1901); the passing of the Postmaster-General's Department's monopoly role (1902–1975) to the arms-length government business Telecom Australia (1975–92); and the introduction of competition with the staged privatisation of Telecom Australia's successor, Telstra, in 1991, 1997 and 2005.

Throughout its 145-year history, TelSoc has kept industry members informed of new developments in network infrastructure, products and services, regulatory changes, end user experience and policy issues, through a combination of lunchtime lectures, major industry networking events, and the publication of newsletters and journals, most especially (from June 1935 to June 2013) the Telecommunications Journal of Australia, succeeded by the Australian Journal of Telecommunications and the Digital Economy. In July 2013, the Telecommunication Society of Australia was transformed to the independent and not-for-profit TelSoc.

== History ==
=== TelSoc's early history ===
TelSoc has its origins in the Telegraph Electrical Society, formed in Melbourne in 1874, twenty years after the installation of Australia's first electrical telegraph line (Melbourne to Williamstown, 1854), and two years after the completion of the Overland Telegraph Line caught the national imagination. The purpose of the Society was 'The promotion of the knowledge of electricity, especially as connected with telegraphy'. The Society regularly published a booklet called 'Transactions' to record its activities.

When the colonies' telegraph and telephony services were nationalized, with the formation of the Commonwealth of Australia in 1901, many of the society's members became employees of the newly formed Australian Postmaster General's Department. TelSoc was reconstituted on 11 November 1908 as the Postal Electrical Society of Victoria, which contained both Telephone and Telegraph Branches. The inaugural President, Henry Walter Jenvey, made it clear that the objectives of the Society were broad: "The field of study is not only electrical. It is too often thought that knowledge of electricity and electrical laws is sufficient to fit an officer of this branch for his duties - but that is not the case - that fact is becoming more widely recognized in all electrical engineering concerns, whether private or Governmental. Before a person can deal satisfactorily with, and solve electrical engineering problems, whether telegraph or telephone, he must be fortified with sound general knowledge. Knowledge of electrical laws itself is not sufficient, he must have a knowledge of things which are taught in schools and universities - without that knowledge he will always find himself deficient."

That broad perspective has been maintained by TelSoc in its different incarnations up to the present.

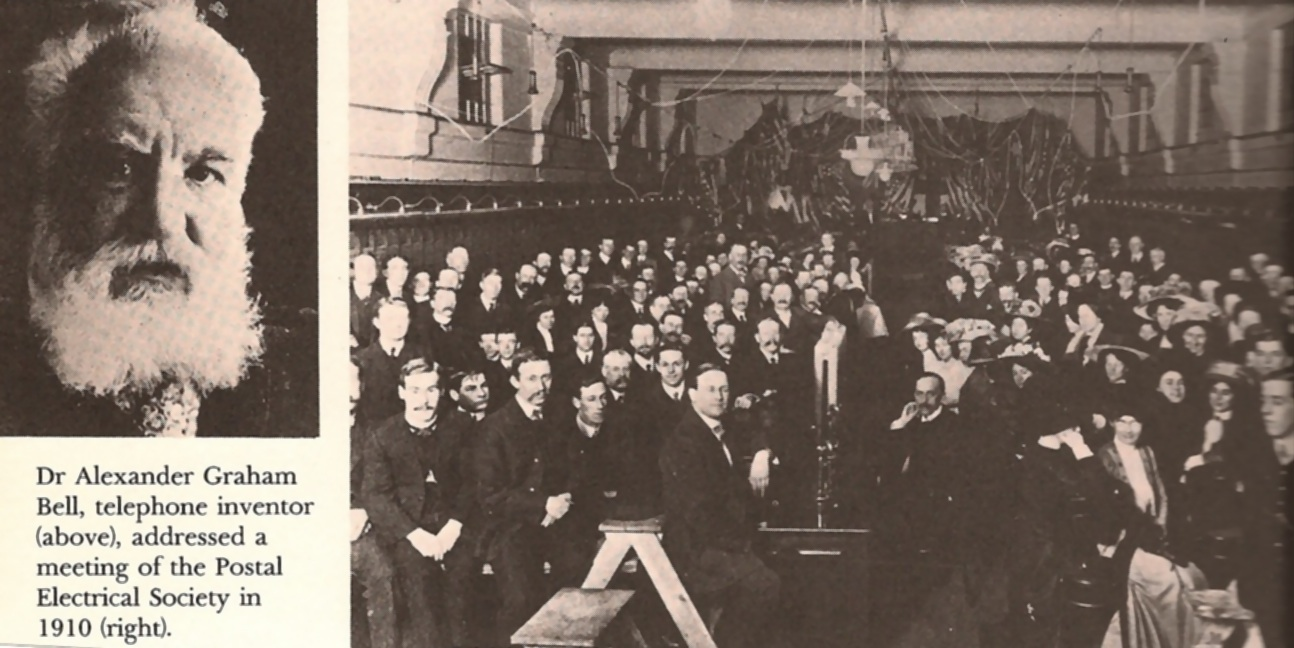
Flashlight photograph of welcome to Dr. Graham Bell, at Melbourne Central Exchange, 17 August 1910

One of the early lecturers at society meetings was the inventor of the telephone, Alexander Graham Bell. Dr Bell visited Melbourne in 1910 and inspected Australia's first automated central telephone exchange during its installation. He honoured the Society at a function held in the Exchange on 17 August 1910 prior to its formal opening.

In the inter-War period, there also existed telecommunications lecture societies in New South Wales and South Australia. The technical papers delivered before each Society were printed and distributed to members, and a limited number forwarded to other States. The Postal Electrical Society of Victoria initiated action to have the various papers published in a new periodical - the Telecommunication Journal of Australia (TJA) which first appeared in 1935, and which has been published at least twice-yearly ever since, even during the World War II years 1939-45.

The Postal Electrical Society of Victoria was reconstituted by the Postmaster-General's Department (PMG) in 1959 as the Telecommunication Society of Australia (TSA), an unincorporated organization, operating as a subsidiary controlled by the PMG. All twelve members of the TSA's Council of Control were constitutionally required to be officers of the Central Administration of the Australian Post Office, the business name adopted by the PMG. The position of Editor-in-Chief of TJA, created in 1960, was then filled by a succession of engineers, all (until 1994) employees of the Australian Post Office (APO) and its successors Telecom Australia and Telstra.

In 1991, following the introduction of competition in the Australian telecommunications market, the links between the Society and the former monopoly Telstra were formally severed, so the TSA could serve the whole industry. (Telstra however remained the principal sponsor of the TSA until 2005.) The Society was incorporated as the Telecommunication Society of Australia Ltd, a not-for-profit independent company in 1993, chaired by a former Telstra executive, Professor Peter Gerrand, who became the Society's longest serving Chairman (1993–2003) and Editor-in-Chief of TJA (1994–2014). The TSA's inaugural Chief Executive Officer was Blair Feenaghty (1994–2005).

Throughout its long history, TelSoc has kept its membership informed on the latest major developments in telecommunications by means of journals, newsletters, monthly lectures and occasional monographs. It has also provided a neutral meeting place for the industry, where employees of competing organizations can meet to discuss topics of common interest across the industry.

TelSoc has always maintained a broad view of the field of 'telecommunications', which has allowed it to evolve with the industry it serves. From the 1930s, the monopoly PMG was given responsibility for providing the radio distribution network for Australia's first national public broadcaster, the [[Australian Broadcasting Corporation]Australian Broadcasting Commission]] (ABC); and from 1956 responsibility for supplying the TV distribution network for the first national public television channel, also produced by the ABC.

With the convergence of digital telecommunications technology with that of the computing industry in the 1980s, and the further convergence via the Internet of telecommunications with digital broadcasting and Internet communication services, the membership of the TSA (now TelSoc) has become increasingly multi-disciplinary.

=== The formation of TelSoc ===
In the second half of 2008 TSA was absorbed into the Australian Computer Society as its Telecommunications Special Interest Group (SIG), which became known as the ACS-TSA under the ACS Telecommunications Board. The transfer of membership and assets (including TJA) to the ACS was achieved through the leadership of Professor Reg Coutts, the final Chairman of TSA Ltd (2005-8) and inaugural Chair of the ACS Telecommunications Board, which directed the ACS-TSA until December 2012. However, in July 2013 the same leadership group of the TSA, led by Professor Reg Coutts, broke away from the ACS-TSA to form a new society TelSoc in order to continue the traditions of the historical TSA. When ACS refused to return TSA's historic name or that of its Journal to the former TSA leadership members, they were forced to create new names for the society (the Telecommunications Association - abbreviated to TelSoc) and for its Journal (see below).

In the tradition of the TSA, TelSoc has continued to offer monthly lectures, special industry networking events, an informative website and the quarterly online Journal of Telecommunications and the Digital Economy (JTDE), successor to the Telecommunications Journal of Australia (TJA) – as the industry's journal of record. The back issues of the TJA (since it went online in November 2007) are archived online by Swinburne University of Technology.

=== Evolution of TelSoc's Journal: TJA to AJTDE to JTDE ===
In 2010 TJA celebrated its 75th Anniversary, having published at least two issues per year every year since June 1935 – including the WW2 years 1939-45. From June 2013, TJA was renamed as the Australian Journal of Telecommunications and the Digital economy, published by TelSoc. In January 2015 Dr Mark Gregory succeeded Professor Peter Gerrand as Managing Editor of AJTDE. In 2019 the Editorial Board of AJTDE decided to emphasize its international scope by changing the title of the journal to the Journal of Telecommunications and the Digital Economy (JTDE). In 2020 Mark Gregory was succeeded by Dr Leith Campbell as Managing Editor of the Journal. Dr Michael de Percy succeeded Leith Campbell on 1 January 2025 as Editor-in-Chief.

== Activities since 2010 ==
=== Major industry events and awards ===
Keynote Industry events are usually held twice a year, in the form of the Charles Todd Oration, in Sydney, and an annual Innovation Address, now called the Henry Sutton Oration, in Melbourne.

The 2010 Charles Todd Oration was delivered in Sydney on 18 August by Mike Quigley, the CEO of NBN Co, responsible for the rollout of the Australian National Broadband Network. The 2011 Charles Todd Oration was delivered by David Thodey, CEO of Telstra; the 2012 Oration was delivered by Chris Chapman, Chairman of the Australian Communications and Media Authority. TelSoc held the 2013 Charles Todd Oration in Sydney with Michael Malone, CEO of iiNet, as Orator, and awarded 2013 Charles Todd Medals to both Michael Malone and Mike Quigley, the founding CEO of NBN Co. The first issue of TelSoc's new Journal, the Australian Journal of Telecommunications and the Digital Economy was published on 8 November 2013 with four quarterly issues published in 2014.

In 2014 the Charles Todd Oration was delivered by Graeme Samuel, and the Charles Todd Medal was awarded to Simon Hackett. TelSoc's inaugural Henry Sutton Oration was delivered in Melbourne on 14 May 2014 by Robyn Williams.

In 2015 the Charles Todd Oration was delivered by Andy Penn, and the Charles Todd Medal was awarded to Teresa Corbin, CEO of ACCAN on 26 November. The Henry Sutton Oration was delivered by Håkon Eriksson on 8 July in Melbourne.

In 2016 the Charles Todd Oration was delivered by Iñaki Berroeta, and the Charles Todd Medal was awarded to optical technology inventor and entrepreneur Simon Poole.

In 2017 the Charles Todd Oration was delivered by Bevan Slattery, and the Charles Todd Medal was awarded to the founder of BuddeComm, Paul Budde.

In 2018 the Charles Todd Oration was delivered by Kathrine Dyer, and the Charles Todd Medal was awarded to the CEO of Vodafone Australia, Iñaki Berroeta.

In 2019 the Charles Todd Oration was delivered by John Lord, and the Charles Todd Medal was not awarded.

In 2022, the 150th anniversary of the completion of the Australian Overland Telegraph Line, the Charles Todd Oration was delivered by Michelle Rowland, Minister for Communications, and the Charles Todd Medal was awarded to David Piltz

In 2023 the Henry Sutton Oration was delivered by David Tudehope, CEO Macquarie Telecom and the Charles Todd Oration delivered by Dr Rob Nicholls.

In 2024 the Henry Sutton Oration is to be delivered by Emilio Romeo, MD & CEO Ericsson Australia & New Zealand

=== The first NBN Policy Forums ===
In 2011 the TSA held NBN Policy Forums in Melbourne and Sydney on June 28 and 30 respectively, based upon policy gaps for the National Broadband Network identified in eleven articles published in the May 2011 issue of TJA. The outcomes of these forums were published in the August 2011 issue of TJA.

=== The current NBN Futures Project ===
In 2019 TelSoc initiated the TelSoc NBN Futures Project, whose outputs are a series of public forums backed up with expert articles published in TelSoc's Journal (JTDE). This project's aim is to develop and promote non-partisan policies for the long-term improvement of the national National Broadband Network (NBN), whose rollout is expected to be completed, depending upon one's definition of 'completion', between 2020 and 2021.

== Board Members ==
The current members of TelSoc's board are:

- Jim Holmes (President)
- Michael de Percy (Vice President)
- Allan Horsley (Secretary)
- Leith Campbell (Treasurer)
- Eiise Ball
- Michelle Lim
- Craig Watkins
