= Alex Rennolds =

Australian rules footballer

Personal information
- Full name: Alexander Wilson Rennolds
- Born: 10 July 1888; Ballarat East, Victoria
- Died: 20 November 1948 (aged 60); Albert Park, Victoria
- Original team: Brighton

Playing career^{1}
Years	Club	Games (Goals)
1910	Melbourne	5 (0)
- ^{1} Playing statistics correct to the end of 1910.

Alexander Wilson Rennolds (10 July 1888 – 20 November 1948) was an Australian rules footballer who played for the Melbourne Football Club in the Victorian Football League (VFL).
