= John Wanna =

Professor

John Wanna AO (born 20 May 1954) is Professor Emeritus at both the Australian National University (ANU) and Griffith University. Before retiring in 2019, Wanna was the Foundation Professor with the Sir John Bunting Chair of Public Administration at the Australia and New Zealand School of Government (ANZSOG) based at the ANU. He held this position from 2004 to 2019. Prior to that he was Professor of Public Policy at Griffith University.

== Scholarly contribution ==
Prior to 2019, Wanna was the leading scholar with ANZSOG at ANU and held the position of National Research Director for the School. He was also Professor in Political Science at the School of Politics and International Relations in the College of Arts and Social Sciences at ANU. He joined ANZSOG in 2004, after having been involved in the planning for the new school of government that officially became ANZSOG in 2002.

He has authored, co-authored, edited, and co-edited more than 50 books and over 100 articles and book chapters. His research focuses on public finance, and he has published three major international studies into government budgeting, including Controlling Public Expenditure (2003), The Reality of Budgetary Reform (2010), and The Global Financial Crisis and its Budget Impacts (2015).

He has also published many monographs on Australian public finance, including Managing Public Expenditure (2000) and From Accounting to Accountability (2001). He has worked on major comparative government projects; including the Future of Governance publications (2000–2003); and Comparing Westminster (2009). He has published a major study of an Australian parliament, entitled The Ayes Have It (2011). Before retiring, he was editor of the ANZSOG-ANU Press monograph series, which had at the time of his retirement over 50 titles in circulation ranging from thematic studies to topical issues in governance, problematic areas of management, and advisory manuals for public servants. The series had over two million downloads as of 2016.

In addition to his scholarly output, Wanna is a regular political commentator on TV (ABC, SBS, Sky, Channels 9 and 7, and international broadcasters) and the print media (The Australian, The Courier-Mail, The Saturday Paper, the Australian Financial Review, and The Conversation). He regularly appears as an Australian politics expert on other media outlets (Bloomberg, the New York Times, the Daily Mail, AFP, Reuters, Fairfax Media). He regularly makes public presentations and talks to practitioner and academic audiences.

== Education and career ==
Wanna has a BA Honours degree (1975) and a PhD (1985) from the University of Adelaide. He is a Fellow of the Academy of Social Sciences in Australia and a National Fellow and former Councillor of the Institute of Public Administration, Australia. He sits on a number of editorial boards and was editor or co-editor of the Australian Journal of Public Administration from 1996 to 2014. Before retiring he was editor of the ANU Press ANZSOG monograph series, and some 50+ titles are all available to download free of charge from either the ANU Press website or from the ANZSOG website. He is a member of the Australian Political Studies Association and the Institute of Public Administration, Australia.

Wanna was formerly Professor of Politics and Public Policy at Griffith University in Brisbane, Queensland. He has held appointments and honorary positions at University of Adelaide, Flinders University, University of Canterbury New Zealand, York University in the United Kingdom, and the China University of Politics and Law in Beijing, China.

Wanna was appointed as an Officer of the Order of Australia (AO) in the 2026 Australia Day Honours for "distinguished service to political and policy research, to tertiary education, to democratic innovation, and to the development of public administration frameworks".

== Research supervision ==
Wanna has supervised more than 60 research students at the PhD, masters, and honours levels.

His research interests for supervision include: Australian politics and public policy, public finance and government budgeting, public administration and management, federalism and intergovernmental relations, government-business relations, legislative studies and Westminster systems, regional studies, biographical studies of politicians.

== Teaching ==
Wanna has taught and given presentations at the following universities and tertiary institutions: London University (Menzies Centre for Australian Studies), University of York (UK), Moscow University (School of Oriental Studies), China University of Politics and Law, Sun Yat Sen University, Guangzhou, Hangzhou University, Victoria University of Wellington, NZ, University of Canterbury NZ, Australian Defence Force Academy (Canberra), NZ Air Force Training Company (Lincoln NZ), Flinders University, University of Adelaide, University of Newcastle, University of New England, Queensland University, Queensland University of Technology, University of Canberra, University of South Australia (SA CAE, Adelaide), and the South Australian Institute of Technology.

== Publications ==
Many of Wanna's ANZSOG books are published online by ANU Press. Some of the titles include:

- Michael de Percy and John Wanna (eds.) (2018). Road Pricing and Provision: Changed Traffic Conditions Ahead. Canberra: ANU Press.

== Research grants ==
Wanna has received ARC nationally competitive research grants, the most recent ones include:

- Improving Decision Making in Government Service Delivery using Third Party Providers
- The Australian Research Council Governance Research Network (GovNet)

In addition, he has received funding from federal and state government departments for commissioned research and was awarded grant to explore government involvement with the not-for-profit third sector.
