= Henry Sutton (inventor) =

Australian inventor (1855–1912)

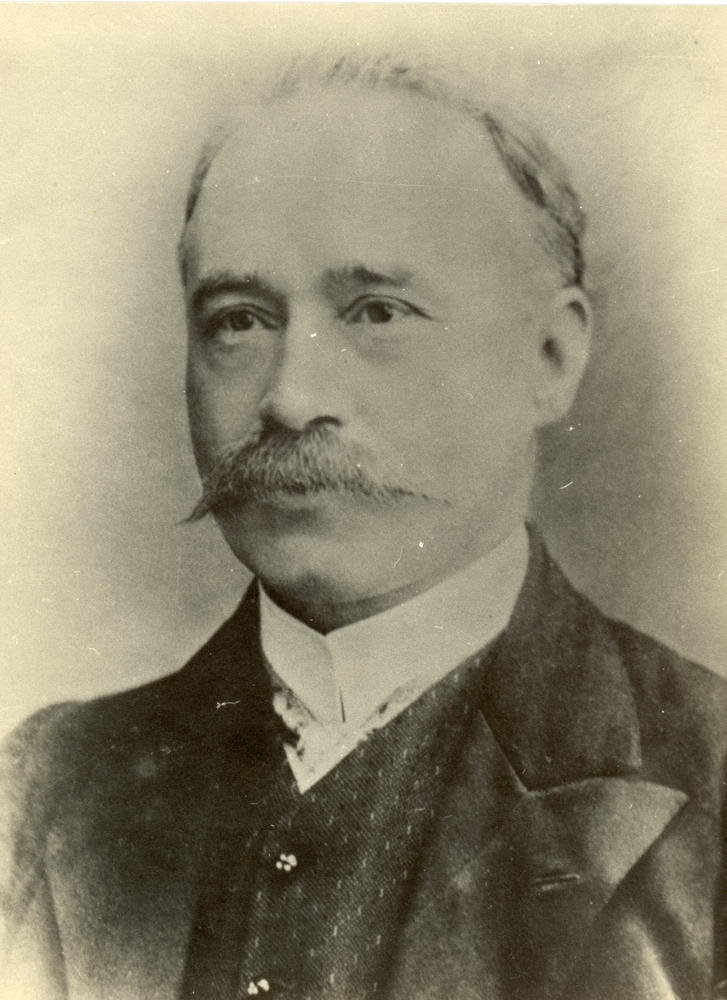
- Sutton c. 1890
- Born: 4 September 1855; Ballarat, Victoria, Australia
- Died: 28 July 1912 (aged 56); Malvern, Victoria, Australia
- Occupations: Inventor, music publisher
- Relatives: Hilda Rix Nicholas (niece)

Henry Sutton (4 September 1855, Ballarat, Victoria – 28 July 1912) was an Australian designer, engineer, and inventor credited with contributions to early developments in electricity, aviation, wireless communication, photography and telephony.

== Early life ==
Family
- Photograph – Richard Henry Sutton 1830-1876, Collection, Gold Museum Ballarat. Retrieved on 5 December 2018.
- Photograph – Black and White – Sutton Family, Historical Collection, Federation University Australia. Retrieved on 5 December 2018.

=== Family ===
Henry Sutton, the second of the eleven children of Richard Henry Sutton (1831 – 1876), and Mary Sutton (1835 – 1894), née Johnson, was born in a tent on the Ballarat goldfields on 4 September 1855. He had three brothers, with whom he was associated in the Sutton Brothers musical business originally centred on Ballarat, (Note: Sutton's Proprietary, Limited, The Ballarat Star, (Saturday, 29 December 1900), p.1; Sutton Bros. and Their Staff, The Ballarat Star, (Tuesday, 1 January 1901), p.6.) and two sisters. He married Elizabeth Ellen Wyatt (1860–1901) in 1881, (Note: Deaths: Sutton, The Australasian, (Saturday, 2 November 1901), p.60.) and Annie May Tatti (1884-), on 17 September 1902, (Note: Marriages: Sutton—Tatti, The Leader, (Saturday, 11 October 1902), p.44.) who bore four and two sons, respectively.

=== Education ===
Up to the age of ten, Sutton was schooled by his mother, then attended a state school, and then Gracefield college between 1869 and 1872. Sutton was self taught in the field of science, having read all the available books in library of the Ballarat Mechanics' lnstitute by the age of 14.

Sutton trained as a draftsman at the Ballarat School of Design where he won a silver medal and 30 other prizes for drawing.

Sutton studied at the Ballarat School of Mines.

== Ballarat ==
Sutton lectured at the Ballarat School of Mines from 1883 to 1886. In 1883, as a consequence of his work on batteries, Sutton was admitted as an associate of the Society of Telegraph Engineers and of Electricians. M. Louis Adolphe Cochery minister of Post and Telegraph Office in France invited Sutton to membership of the Société Internationale des Electriciens. Sutton was also offered membership of Electrical societies from America, Belgium and Russia. In 1890 prior to leaving for England, a farewell dinner was held by the citizens of Ballarat, where Sutton was presented with an Illuminated address.

== London: 1890–1893 ==
Sutton registered Sutton's Process Syndicate in November 1891 at an address in London to exploit his Suttontype printing process. The process was not considered particularly innovative and it was reported to be unreliable. He abandoned the business to return to Australia.

In 1892, he was introduced to Nikola Tesla by Lord Rayleigh and William Preece.

On the return voyage to Australia in 1893, Sutton used his printing process to contribute pictures to a shipboard newspaper called the Red Sea Scorcher.

== Melbourne ==
Sutton travelled with Alexander Graham Bell from Melbourne to Ballarat on 15 August 1910 where they discussed their respective discoveries.

Sutton died suddenly, at his residence ("Waltham", 9 Erskine Street, Malvern), on 28 July 1912, at the age of 56 and was buried in the Brighton Cemetery.

== Inventions ==
=== Printing ===
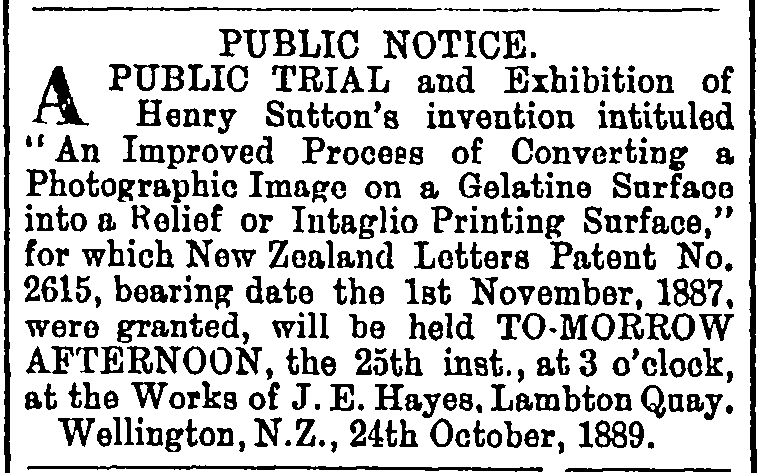
The Evening Post, Wellington, 24 October 1889

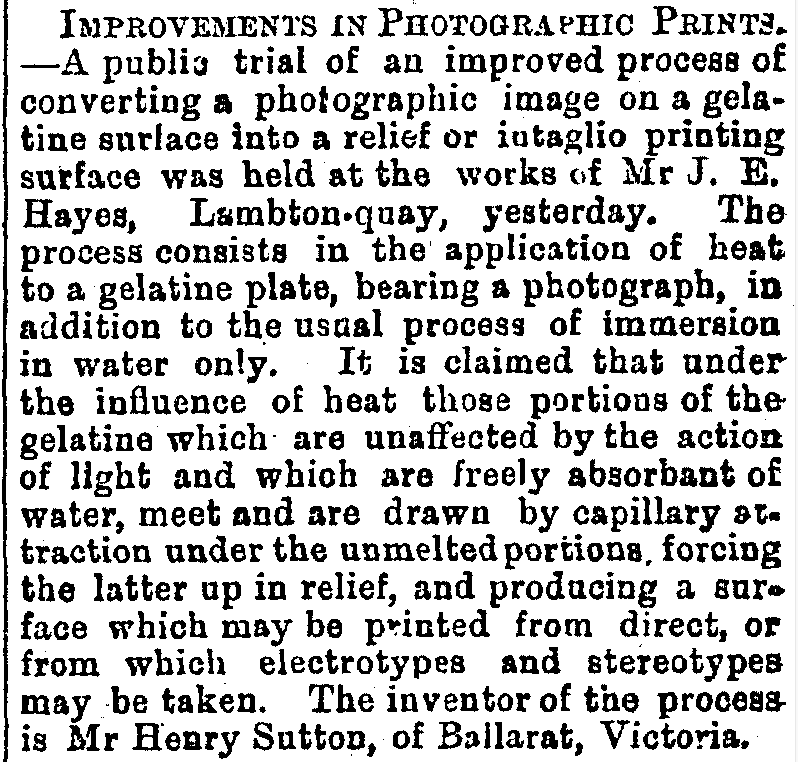
New Zealand Times, 26 October 1889

Sutton's Suttontype process for converting photographs into a printing surface was patented in 1887. (Note: AU-VIC 5389Victoria Government Gazette 104, Friday, October 28th 1887, Victoria Government Gazette 108, Friday, November 11th 1887, Photography Patent 1887, October 20th. No. 5389, Ballaarat Mechanics' Institute, Branch (2018). p.283.)

=== Wireless telegraphy ===
Sutton discovered, and patented, a galena "detector" that had superior performance over other devices used to that time. (Note: AU 2621 An improved detector of electric oscillations for wireless telegraphy and like purposes, Australian Patent No. 2621/11, 29 September 1911, Branch (2018). p.297.)

Sutton had also built the world's first portable radio and held a number of other patents relating to wireless transmission and reception. (Note: AU 3354 Improved means of producing electric oscillations for wireless telegraphy and other purposes Branch (2018). p.299.) (Note: AU 16633 Improvements relating to the production and transmission of hertzian waves, Branch (2018). p.297.) (Note: AU 17127 Improved means for preventing 'arcing' of the gap in the production of high potential electrical oscillations, Branch (2018). p.297.) (Note: AU 17433 Improved means for detecting acoustic electric, or like waves, Branch (2018). p.297.)

== Other endeavours ==
=== Aviation ===
Sutton built a clockwork-driven ornithopter operating on a fixed arm and presented two papers on flight to the Aeronautical Society of Great Britain, in 1878, entitled "On the Flight of Birds and Aërial Navigation" (Note: The first page of the article (p.30) does not display Sutton's name but it is to be found at the foot of the previous page) and "Second Paper on the Flight of Birds".

=== Batteries ===
In 1881, Sutton had developed a new rechargeable battery which was patented the following year. He also wrote of a four-volt cell compound battery invention which was described as impossible by the English Mechanic and World of Science in 1890.

=== Lighting ===
Sutton demonstrated a light globe sixteen days after Edison's demonstration on 31 December 1879.

Subsequently Sutton's vacuum pump design which overcame deficiencies in the Sprengel pump, was used for the production of light globes by the Edison Swan company.

=== Telephony ===
After reading of Bell's 1876 announcement of the invention of the telephone, Sutton had designed about twenty different telephones within a year. Australian historian Ann Moyal states that Sutton "believed in the free flow of information as a gift to science ... patented little, although sixteen of his twenty original telephone designs were patented by others overseas".

The first Australian telephone connection was made in Ballarat and Ballarat East, linking fire stations in the two towns. The exact location of one of the telephone sets can be seen in the Ballarat East Fire Station. The device once allowed communication between the two fire brigades in Ballarat so that they could more accurately locate fires from their watch towers. Sutton had also wired up Sutton's Music Stores, his family business warehouses and offices, with a telephone network two years before an official Australian telephone system. Sutton devised a method for using gas and water pipes as part of a telephone circuit. (Note: AU-VIC 4784Victoria Government Gazette 122, Friday, November 12th 1886, Improvements in electric circuits for telephonic purposes Patent 1886 October 26th. No.4784, Ballaarat Mechanics' Institute.)

=== Microscopy ===
In 1885 after cholera outbreak on a ship in Queensland, Sutton obtained a slide and managed to photograph the cholera germ at 1000 times magnification. A letter to this effect, from Sutton, was published in The Argus on 28 December 1885.

=== Photography ===
In the 1880s Sutton also devised a colour photography process but, although examples of this work exist, he did not commercialize it.

=== Television ===
In 1885, Sutton designed, but did not construct, a mechanical television apparatus to see the Melbourne Cup in Ballarat. Sutton had published his Telephane designs in 1890. According to historian Ann Moyal, the concept was never successfully demonstrated: "Sutton's 'TV system', which he called 'telephany', used all the latest technology, such as the recently-invented Kerr effect, the Nipkow disc (which Baird was to use in the 1920s) and the selenium photocell. But its weak link in the 1870s was that the signal had to be transferred by telegraph lines, as radio had yet to arrive, and these were too slow to transmit the dashing horses of the Melbourne Cup successfully."

=== Facsimile ===
Sutton used his telephane system to demonstrate facsimile transmission with the help of Nicola Tesla in England. An account of his invention was later published in Washington in 1896, noting that the first patents for long-distance transmission of images dated back to 1867.

=== Lifts ===
For the benefit of his mother, who had been paralyzed by a stroke, a new hydraulic lift had been installed in the newly built Suttons Music Emporium. As Ballarat's low water pressure and lack of an efficient drainage system were incompatible, Sutton designed and built a new hydraulic mechanism to drive the lift. This design was subsequently used by the Austral Otis company and exported for use in America.

=== Automotive ===
Second Sutton Autocar
- Photograph: Second Sutton Autocar, Collection of Institute of Electrical and Electronics Engineers, Victorian Section. Retrieved on 5 December 2018.

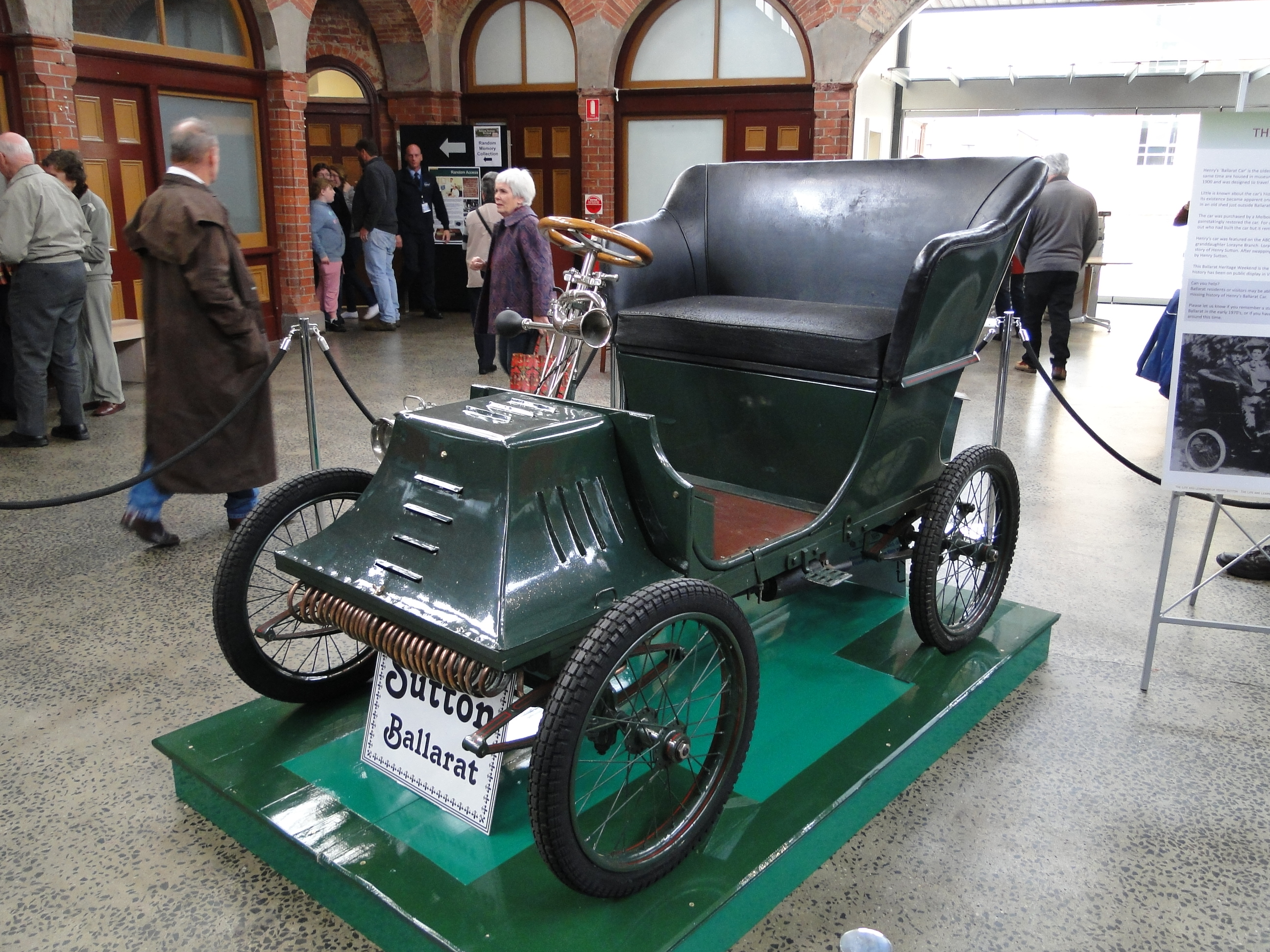
A Sutton Voiturette Pedal Car, built in Ballarat, Victoria, Australia, in 1900 and on display in 2011 at the Ballarat Heritage Festival

"Henry Sutton can be classed as an automobile inventor and designer rather than a manufacturer whose achievements were considerable and internationally recognized. As an inventor he produced a number of automobiles of his own design in an evolutionary process (somewhere between six and eight)." In 1897, a tricycle fitted with a Sutton designed and built engine was driven from Melbourne to Ballarat. Despite atrocious road conditions the trip was completed in eleven and a half hours, and the vehicle arrived in Ballarat to a crowd of thousands.

From 1898 Sutton held patents for improvements in combustion engine carburettors; (Note: US 650736"Explosive-engine. US 650736". Google patents. 7 December 1898. Branch (2018). p.286.) (Note: US 664689"Speed-regulator for explosive-engines. US 664689". Google patents. 10 July 1899.Branch (2018). p.286.) (Note: GB 189900634 Improvements in and relating to Internal Combustion Engines. Branch (2018). p.286.) (Note: AU-VIC 15777 Improvements in and relating to Internal Combustion Engines Victoria Government Gazette 31, Friday, April 28th 1899. Branch (2018). p.286.) (Note: FR 285240 Branch (2018). p.286.) (Note: AU-NSW 9327Improvements in and relating to Internal combustion engines: Patent No. 9327 Patents and Inventions, The (Sydney) Daily Telegraph, (Tuesday, 13 June 1899), p.3.) and, by 1899, he had built and driven the Sutton Autocar, one of the first motor cars in Australia.

== Automobile Club of Victoria ==
Sutton was a founding member of the Automobile Club of Victoria; and, at its inaugural meeting, on 10 December 1903, Sutton's proposed "objects of the club" were unanimously accepted by all present:

"that the objects of the club should be the promotion of a social organisation and club, composed mainly of persons owning self-propelled vehicles or motor cycles; to afford a means of recording the experiences of members and others using motor cars and motor cycles; to promote investigation in their development; to co-operate in securing rational legislation and the formation of proper rules and regulations governing the use of motor cars and motor cycles in cities, towns and country districts; to maintain the lawful rights and privileges and protect the interests of owners and users of all forms of self-propelled vehicles whenever and wherever such interests, rights and privileges are menaced; to promote and encourage the improvement, construction and maintenance of roads and highways and the development generally in this State of motoring, and to maintain a club to be devoted to the interests and advancement of automobilism."

== Legacy ==
=== Henry Sutton Circuit ===
On 20 January 2004, several streets in the new Canberra suburb of Dunlop were named after "inventors, inventions, and artists"; and one of these new streets was called "Henry Sutton Circuit".

=== The Henry Sutton Oration ===
In 2014, the Telecommunications Association (formerly known as the Telecommunications Society of Australia, which had its origins in the Telegraph Electrical Society, founded in Melbourne in 1874), inaugurated its annual Henry Sutton Oration.

=== Poetry ===
Les Murray referred to Sutton and television in his 1990 poem "The Tube".

=== The Science Show ===
Science journalist Robyn Williams has featured Sutton in episodes of his long-running radio program.
