= Black Hill, Victoria =

Black Hill
- Suburb
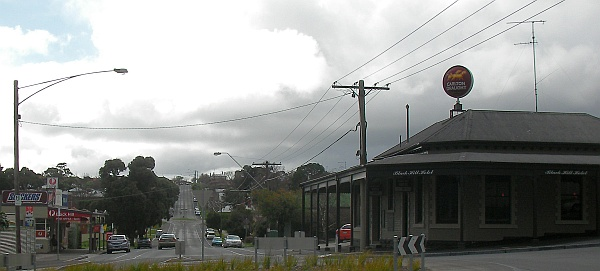
- Corner of Napier and Peel Street. The Post Office is on the left and the Black Hill Hotel on the right.

- Interactive map of Black Hill
- Coordinates: 37.5600°S 143.8726°E
- Country: Australia
- State: Victoria
- City: Ballarat
- LGA: City of Ballarat
- Location: 2 km (1.2 mi) from Ballarat Central

Government
  - State electorate: Wendouree
  - Federal division: Ballarat

Area
  - Total: 1.74 km^{2} (0.67 sq mi)

Population
  - Total: 2,124 (2021 census)
  - Density: 1,221/km^{2} (3,162/sq mi)
- Postcode: 3350
Suburbs around Black Hill
Ballarat North	Ballarat North	Nerrina
Ballarat North	Black Hill	Nerrina
Soldiers Hill	Ballarat East	Brown Hill

Black Hill is a suburb of Ballarat, Victoria, Australia in the northeast of the city. It is named after the major landmark, Black Hill, on which there was extensive and highly profitable open-cut gold mining from the early 1850s during the Victoria gold rush. The hill was originally known as Kirrit Barrett by the Wadawurrung people, but was later renamed Black Hill by surveyor William Urquhart.

This is a suburb that many locals claim to be the ‘Fitzroy of Ballarat’, due to its high house price, large blocks of land and distance to the CBD.

The population at the 2021 census was 2,124.

== Topography ==
The suburb, at is highest, is some 520m above sea level. The suburb is bordered to the south and east by the Yarrowee River and to the north by Howitt Street, Walker Street and Boronia/Haimes Road and Reid Street to the west by Havelock and Rowe Streets. The Yarrowee River, Ballarat's major linear corridor, adjoins the reserve to the south. Urban areas of residential development adjoin the Reserve to the north, east and west.

== History ==
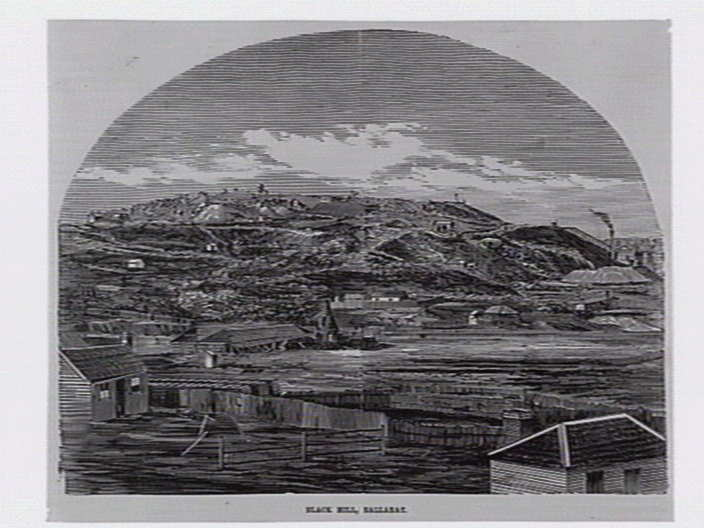
Looking toward Black Hill from Ballarat in 1862

According to Federation University's Ballarat and District Industrial Heritage Project, Black Hill was known as 'Bowdun' by the local Wadawurrung people, until it was renamed by the surveyor William Urquart in 1851. The subtitle 'Black Hill' was given by Urquart in reference to the dense canopy of trees. However, extensive mining over the 1850s saw the hill stripped of trees and significantly reduced in height, as well as the creation of a valley. It became a focal point for quartz causing operations at this time, with the erection of a crushing battery at the base of the hill, probably the first in Australia. As late as 1856 this is evidence that Indigenous peoples lived amongst miners at Black Hill, with some oral history accounts of child minding during the Eureka Rebellion.

By the mid-1860s the hill became known as the "White Cliffs of Ballarat" due to the open cut mining operations which exposed cliffs of sandstone. The various buildings associated with the mine would have been located at the base of the hill across from the Newman Street footbridge that exists today. On the southern side of the Yarrowee River were the Black Hill Flats, which were mined extensively for gold which was located at the surface and in deep leads far below. The flats are now located in the suburb of Ballarat East. By 1907 mining operations had almost ended and the hill was turned into a reserve. Local community groups, including the girl guides, planted Montarey pine (pinus radiata), many of which still exist today.

Black Hill Post Office opened on 7 June 1864.

== Education ==
The local primary school is Black Hill Primary School, located on Chisholm Street, which was started in 1878, although the initial request to government was made earlier in 1862. It is government owned and has a kindergarten. The school has students from prep to year 6. It has 526 students enrolled as of 2019.

== Parks and reserves ==
One reserve in the area is the Black Hill Reserve and is approximately 21 hectares and is located about 1.7 km northeast of the Ballarat CBD. The hill is a dominant landmark within the urban landscape of Ballarat and the lookout area at the top of the hill provides a carpark lookout over Ballarat, encompassing the East around to the airport. The reserve's terrain is steep and undulating with significant areas of exposed soils. The landscape has since been heavily forested with mature pine trees in plantations and more recent plantings of native trees. There is extensive observable evidence of its mining history, including only tunnels. The hill has many downhill mountain bike riding trails, varying in difficulty.

Black Hill also has a public swimming pool, with a solar heated 25m outdoor pool, toddlers pool, BBQ and picnic facilities, which is open from November to the end of March. Although it is generally closed if the temperature is below 23 degrees.

There is another reserve, Chisholm Street Reserve, which is a large grassland. Both of these reserves are leash free areas, meaning that you take your dog off the lead.

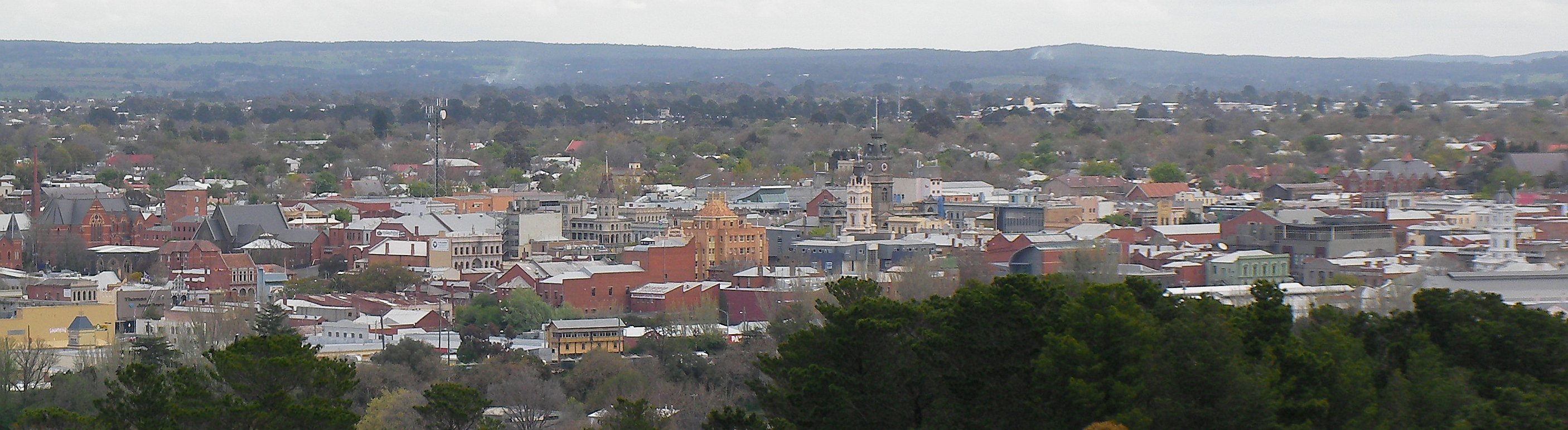
Ballarat CBD panorama from Black Hill lookout

== Transport ==
Black Hill has 2 bus routes, operated by CDC Ballarat. Route 13 goes from the Ballarat CBD to Invermay Park via Peel Street, Macarthur St and Lydiard St. Route 14 goes from the Ballarat CBD to part of Brown Hill and Chisholm Street, up Peel St and Havelock St and loops around Walker and Norman Sts. Black Hill's main north–south road is Peel Street. The east–west main road is Chisholm Street.
