= Ballarat Fire Station =

Historic fire station in Victoria, Australia

Coordinates: 37.563811°S 143.868677°E

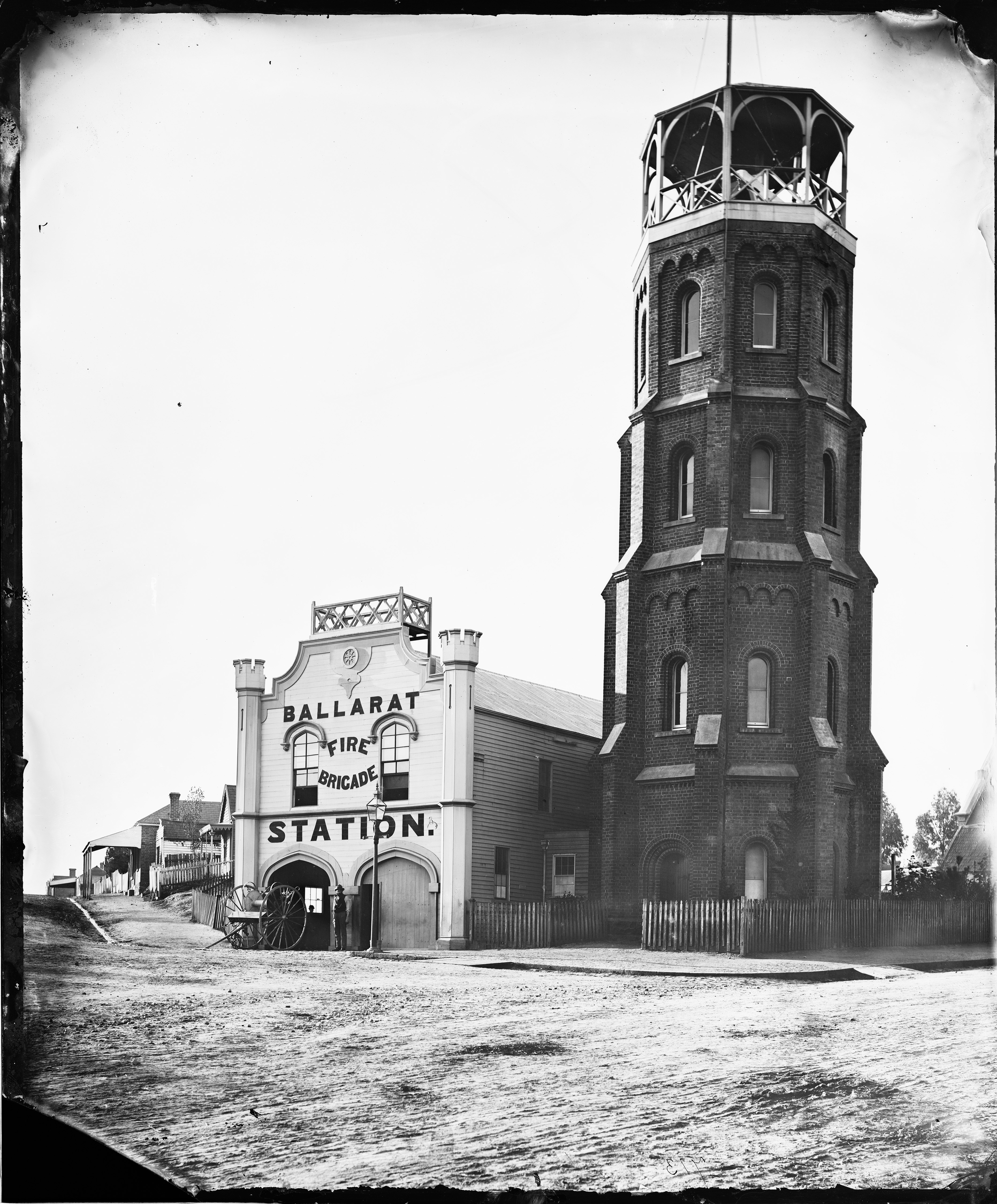
Ballarat Fire Brigade Station, Victoria, Australia, 1873

The Ballarat Fire Station is a historic fire station in Ballarat, Victoria, Australia which was opened in 1856.

On the morning of 7 December 1859 a large fire destroyed twenty-one hotels, stores and dwellings, a large number of outhouses and property in the city in less than an hour. The Brigade after some delay due to a difficulty with the water pipes.able to keep the gold office safe.

By 1891 the Ballarat city volunteer brigade was acknowledged as being one of the best in Australia. At this time it consisted of 15 active working members scattered all over the city who were governed by six officers and a paid station-keeper, residing on the premises. It was the station-keeper's duty to be on watch in the tower for either the first or second half of the night and to ring the alarm in cases of fire as well as drive the hose brake to the fires and attend to the telephones and fire alarms.

The 'Ballarat Fire Station' and the Ballarat East Fire Station in Ballarat East have always been operated from the station in Ballarat East and they shared the first operational telephone.

Another fire brigade in Ballarat was originally called the 'Ballarat West fire Brigade' which later changed its name to 'Ballarat City fire Brigade' which is located in Sturt Street.
