= Leigh River (Victoria) =

Perennial river in Victoria, Australia

Leigh
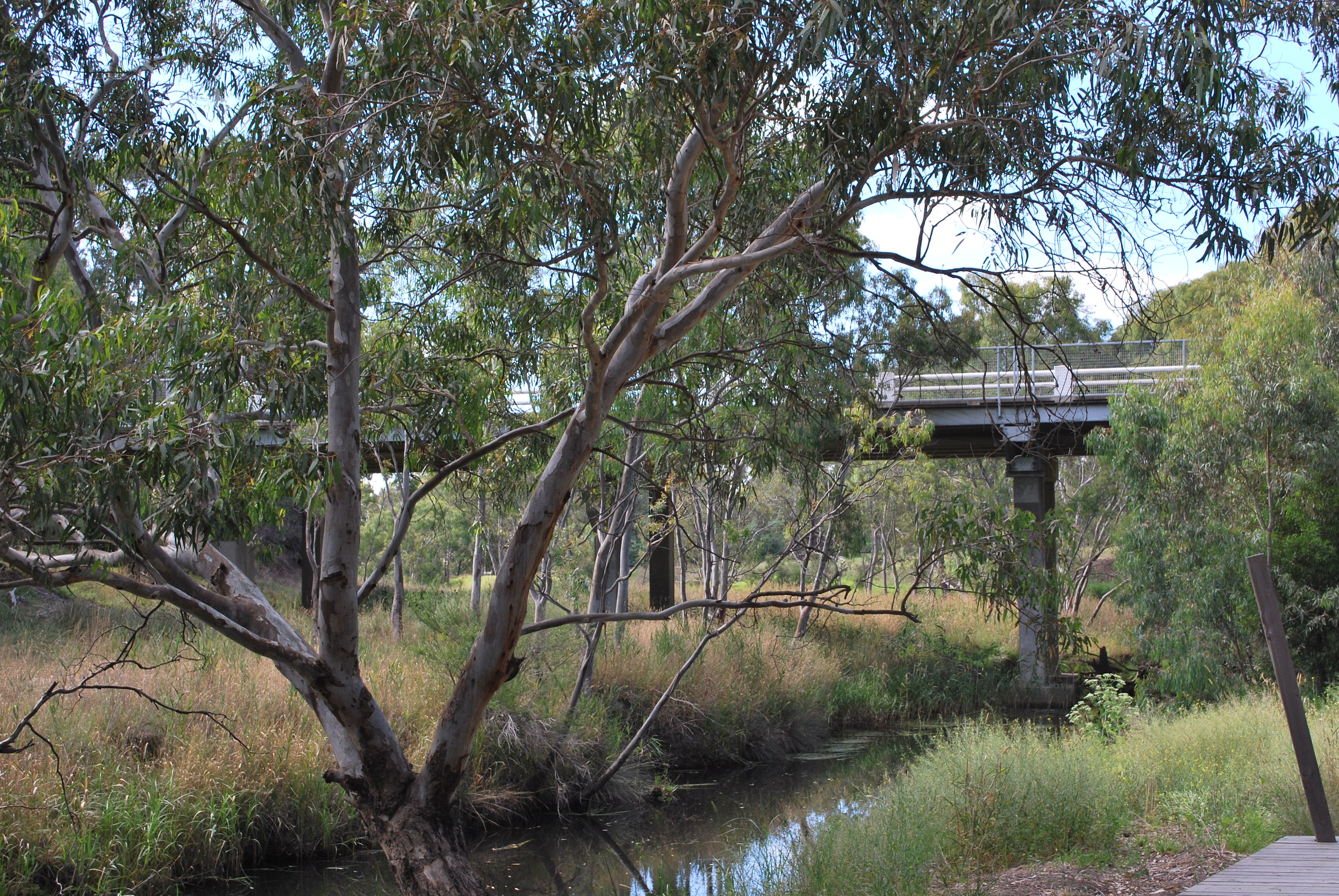
- The Leigh River at Inverleigh. The Hamilton Highway bridge is visible in the background.

- Location of the Leigh River mouth in Victoria
- Etymology: Aboriginal Wathaurong: Waywatcurtan

Location
- Country: Australia
- State: Victoria
- Region: Central Highlands

Physical characteristics
- Source: Mount Mercer
  - location: Cambrian Hill
  - coordinates: 37°37′48″S 143°49′54″E
  - elevation: 325 m (1,066 ft)
- Source confluence: Yarrowee River
- Mouth: Barwon River
  - location: near Inverleigh
  - coordinates: 38°06′31″S 144°03′48″E
  - elevation: 60 m (200 ft)
- Length: 61 km (38 mi)

Basin features
- River system: Corangamite catchment
- Tributaries
  - left: Wilson Creek (Victoria), Williamson Creek, Cargerie Creek

The Leigh River (or Waywatcurtan in the Wathaurong Aboriginal language) is a perennial river of the Corangamite catchment, in the Central Highlands region of the Australian state of Victoria.

== Location and features ==
The Leigh River is a major tributary and catchment of the Barwon River. Fed by the Yarrowee River that rises near Ballarat, the Yarrowee reaches its confluence to form the Leigh in the vicinity of Cambrian Hill and Golden Plains Shire. The Leigh River rises below Mount Mercer and flows generally south, joined by three minor tributaries before reaching its confluence with the Barwon River, southeast of the central business district of Inverleigh. The river descends 265 metres (869 ft) over its 61-kilometre (38 mi) course.

=== Communities and bridge crossings along the river ===
The Leigh passes through localities including Inverleigh, Shelford, and Mount Mercer, and forms one of the borders of Teesdale.

There are several crossings over the Leigh River, including road, rail and pedestrian. Some additional roads allow passage through shallow sections of the river when the water levels are low.

Location	Bridge name	Comments/use	Image
Mount Mercer	Leigh Gorge Bridge (formerly Leigh Grand Junction Mine bridge)	Mount Mercer/Meredith Road	
Shelford	Town Bridge	Bannockburn/Skipton Road	
Inverleigh	Two Bridges	Inverleigh/Teesdale Road	
Inverleigh	Federation Bridge	Pedestrian suspension	
Inverleigh		Hamilton Highway	
Inverleigh		Standard gauge Melbourne/Adelaide railway	

== Etymology ==
The Wathaurong Aboriginal people named the river Waywatcurtan.

It is believed that the name Leigh River was given by the surveyor J.H. Wedge who arrived in 1835, probably naming the river after his Tasmanian farm Leighlands.

== See also ==
- List of rivers of Australia § Victoria
