= Ballarat East Fire Station =

Heritage-listed fire station in Victoria, Australia

Ballarat Fire Station
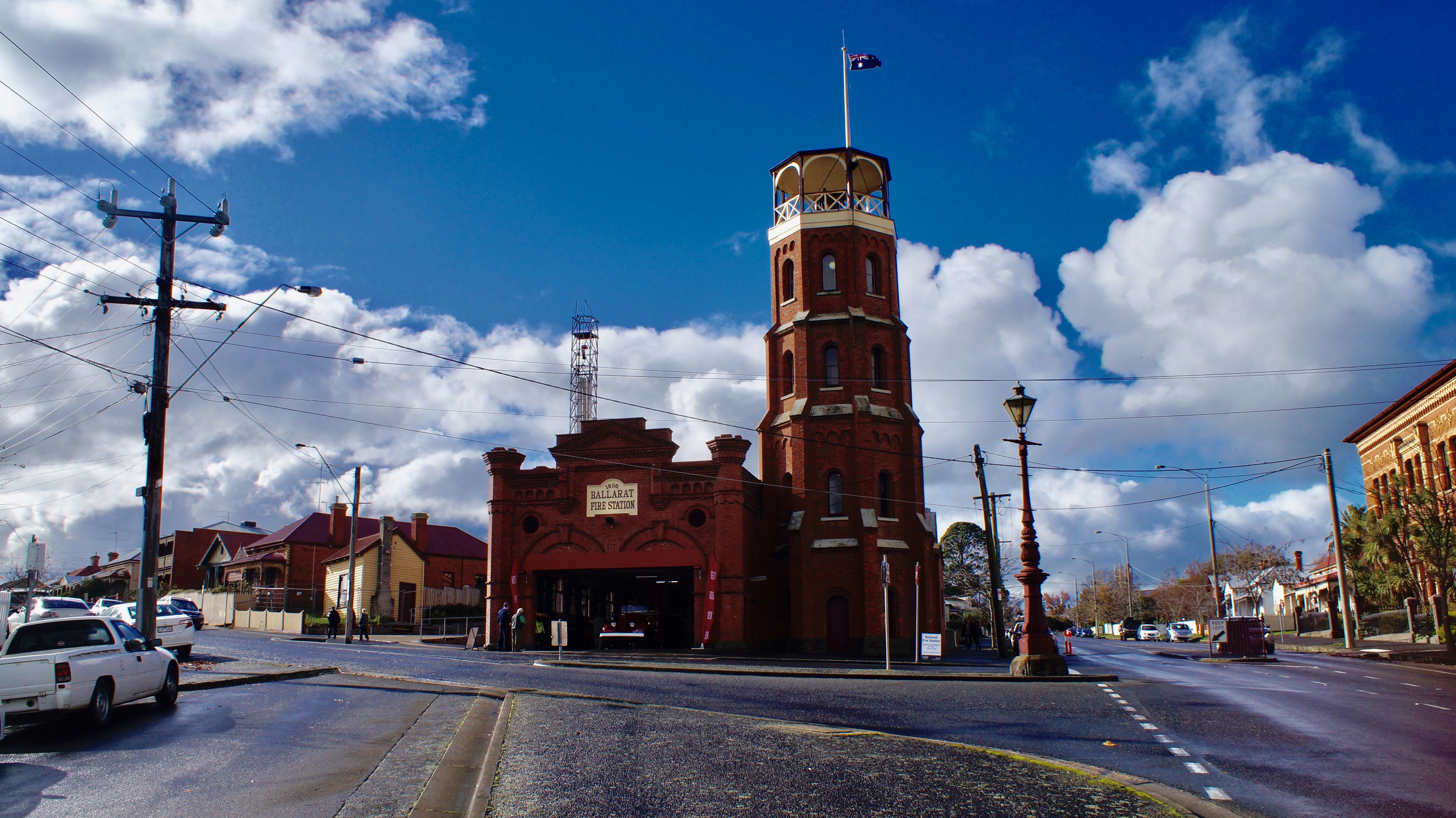

- Location within Australia
- 37.563811°S 143.868677°E
- Location: 20-22 Barkly Street, Ballarat East

History
- Built: 1864, 1916

Site notes
- Architect: Henry Caselli

Victorian Heritage Register

The Ballarat Fire Station, in Ballarat East, Victoria, Australia is the oldest continually operating fire station in the Southern Hemisphere.

The tower was designed by local architect Henry Caselli and was built in 1864 by William Cowland, a builder and fire brigade volunteer. Caselli's design for an Engine House was not built; an 1858-built structure was used. The Engine House was replaced by a new one in 1916.

It was one site of the first operational telephone, made by Henry Sutton, which connected this station to the Ballarat Fire Station in Ballarat, to help the two stations pinpoint the locations of fires and coordinate their responses.

It is located at 20-22 Barkly Street in Ballarat East.
