= Brown Hill, Victoria =

Brown Hill Ballarat, Victoria
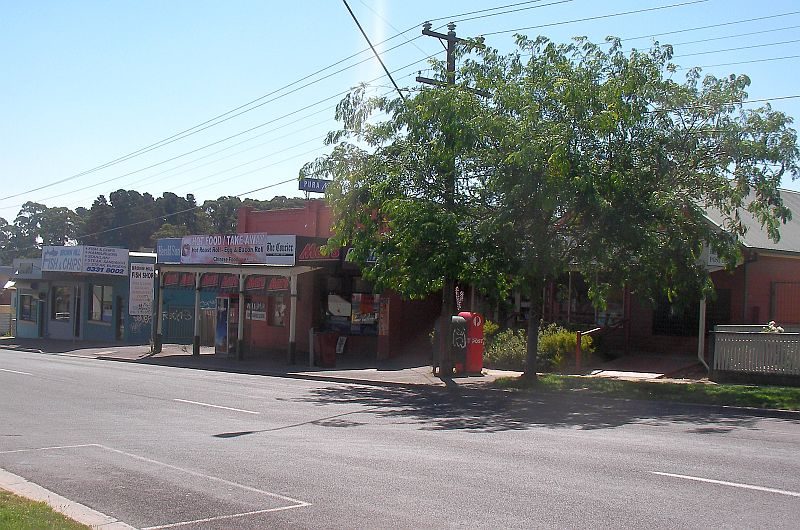
- Humffray Street North village, Brown Hill. The milk bar is to the building to the right

- Coordinates: 37.5495°S 143.9125°E
- Population: 4,489 (2021 census)
- Postcode(s): 3350
- Location: 5 km (3 mi) from Ballarat Central
- LGA(s): City of Ballarat
- State electorate(s): Eureka
- Federal division(s): Ballarat
Suburbs around Brown Hill:
Black Hill	Nerrina	Glen Park
Ballarat East	Brown Hill	Gong Gong
Ballarat East	Ballarat East	Ballarat East, Warrenheip

Brown Hill is a suburb of Ballarat, Victoria, Australia on the eastern rural-urban fringe of the city, 5 kilometres east of the Central Business District. The population at the 2021 census was 4,489.

The suburb's name is a corruption of Brownbill's Hill, which was named after prospector William Brownbill, who early during the Ballarat gold rush claimed and settled the area.

The suburb is located on a valley to the south and east of the Brown Hill range and Gong Gong and straddles both sides of the Western Freeway.

Today, Brown Hill is almost an entirely residential area with large areas of open and recreational space and several schools.

Brown Hill incorporates the unbounded neighbourhood of Woodmans Hill (originally a separate area) is located within Brown Hill adjacent to Warrenheip in the east.

== History ==
The area was first settled in 1851 as the prospector William Brownbill claimed the area during the Ballarat gold rush. The hill after which the suburb was named was originally Brownbill's Hill with the name later corrupted to "Brown Hill".

Brown Hill Post Office opened on 1 December 1857.

== Education ==
Brown Hill is home to many schools including the campus of Ballarat Secondary College, Caledonian Primary School, Saint Francis Xavier College (a Catholic Prep - Year 6 Primary School) and Brown Hill Kindergarten.

== Parks and open space ==
Brown Hill has several sporting fields, including the 18 hole Mount Xavier Golf Course. There is also the Brown Hill Pool, a 25 Metre publicly owned unheated pool. Brown Hill has a cricket club which competes in the Ballarat Cricket Association. The training ground in Brown Hill is known as Progress Park, and the hard wicket there is used in home games for the club's third and fourth eleven, as well as junior matches. The club's first and second grades play home matches on the turf wicket at the Western Oval in Ballarat.

== Transport ==
Brown Hill is serviced by the Ballarat bus service.

== Notable people ==
1996 Olympic Gold Medallist in Shooting, Russell Mark was raised at a property in Boundary Road.
