= Nerrina =

- Suburb
- Interactive map of Nerrina
- Coordinates: 37.533°S 143.903°E
- Country: Australia
- State: Victoria
- City: Ballarat
- LGA: City of Ballarat
- Location: 4 km (2.5 mi) from Ballarat Central

Government
  - State electorate: Ripon
  - Federal division: Ballarat

Population
  - Total: 970 (2021 census)
- Postcode: 3350
Suburbs around Nerrina
Invermay	Glen Park	Glen Park
Brown Hill	Nerrina	Black Hill
Brown Hill	Brown Hill	Brown Hill

Nerrina is a suburb of Ballarat, Victoria, Australia on the north-eastern rural-urban fringe of the city, 4 kilometres (2.5 mi) east of the Central Business District. The population at the 2021 census was 970.

Nerrina is a semi-rural suburb with a very small township and commercial area. It is located on the foothills of the Brown Hill range and straddles both sides of the Western Freeway.

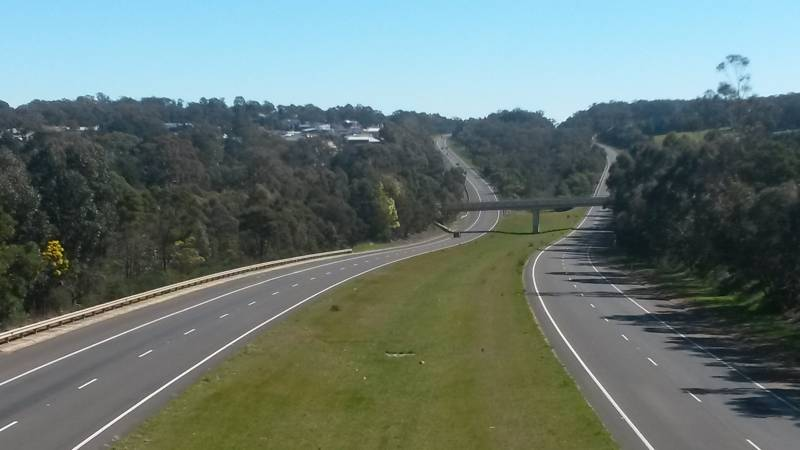
A view of the Western Freeway (M8) at Nerrina looking west toward Doodts Road, Ballarat North and Invermay from the Nerrina pedestrian overpass.

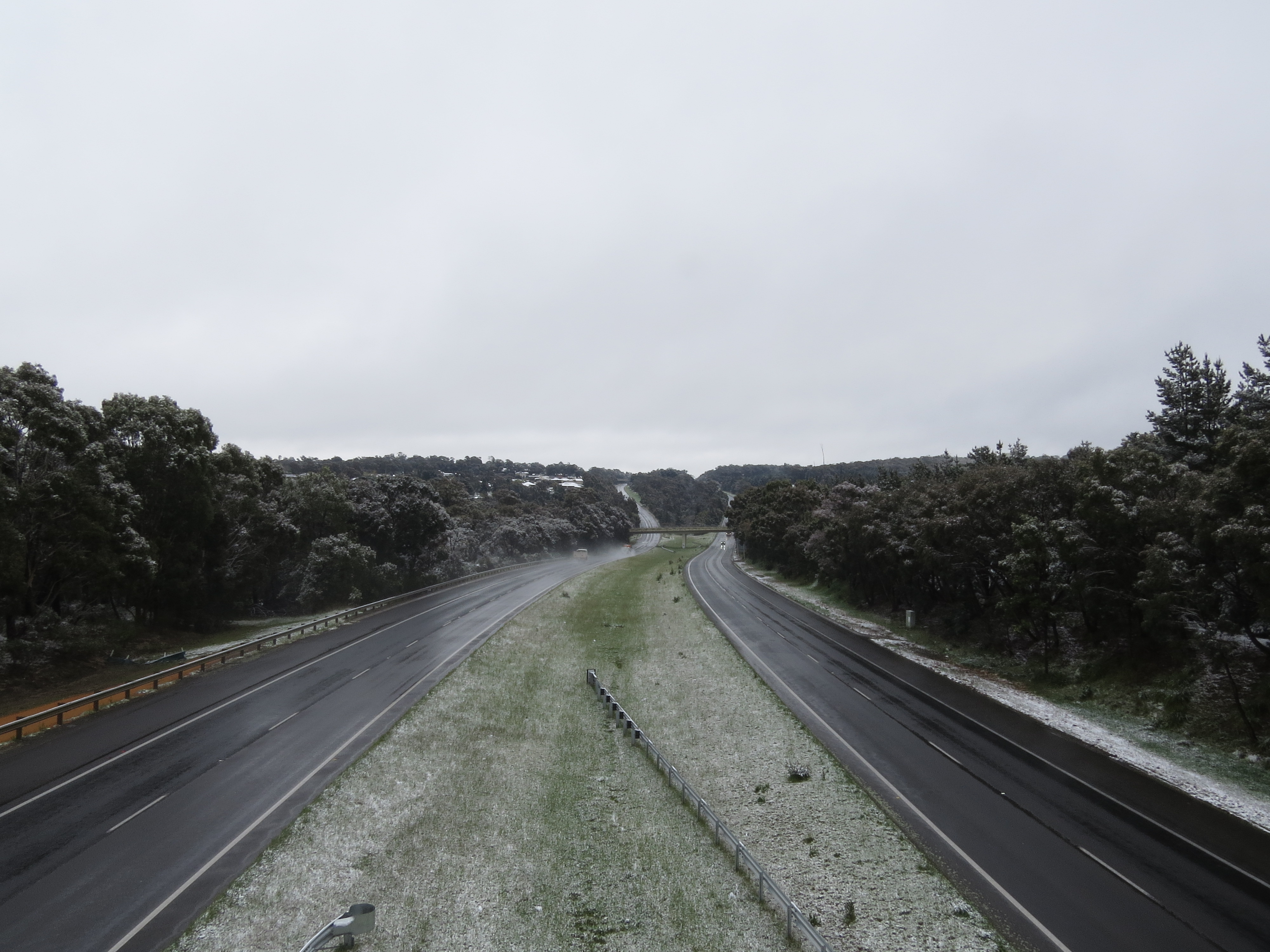
Another view from the Nerrina pedestrian overpass showing the surroundings smothered in snow on the 25 of September 2020.

== History ==
Historically, this area was known as Nerrena (named after the Nerrena Creek) and then Little Bendigo (after Bendigo, Victoria) . Little Bendigo Post Office opened on 1 June 1862, was renamed Nerrina in 1881 and closed in 1971.

== Education ==
The local primary school is Little Bendigo Primary School.
