= Gong Gong, Victoria =

Gong Gong
- Suburb
- Interactive map of Gong Gong
- Coordinates: 37.5481°S 143.9351°E
- Country: Australia
- State: Victoria
- City: Ballarat
- LGA: City of Ballarat

Government
  - State electorate: Ripon
  - Federal division: Ballarat

Population
  - Total: N/A (2021 census)
- Postcode: 3352
Suburbs around Gong Gong
	Nerrina
Brown Hill	Gong Gong	Leigh Creek
	Warrenheip

Gong Gong is a locality on the Eastern rural fringe of the City of Ballarat municipality in Victoria, Australia. At the 2021 census, Gong Gong did not have a population high enough to be recorded. The suburb is mostly state forest and contains two reservoirs, Gong Gong and Kirks, that supply Ballarat with potable water. The smaller of the two reservoirs is surrounded by parkland which contains a small ornamental garden.
