= Michael de Percy =

Conservative Australian academic, political scientist, and commentator (born 1970)

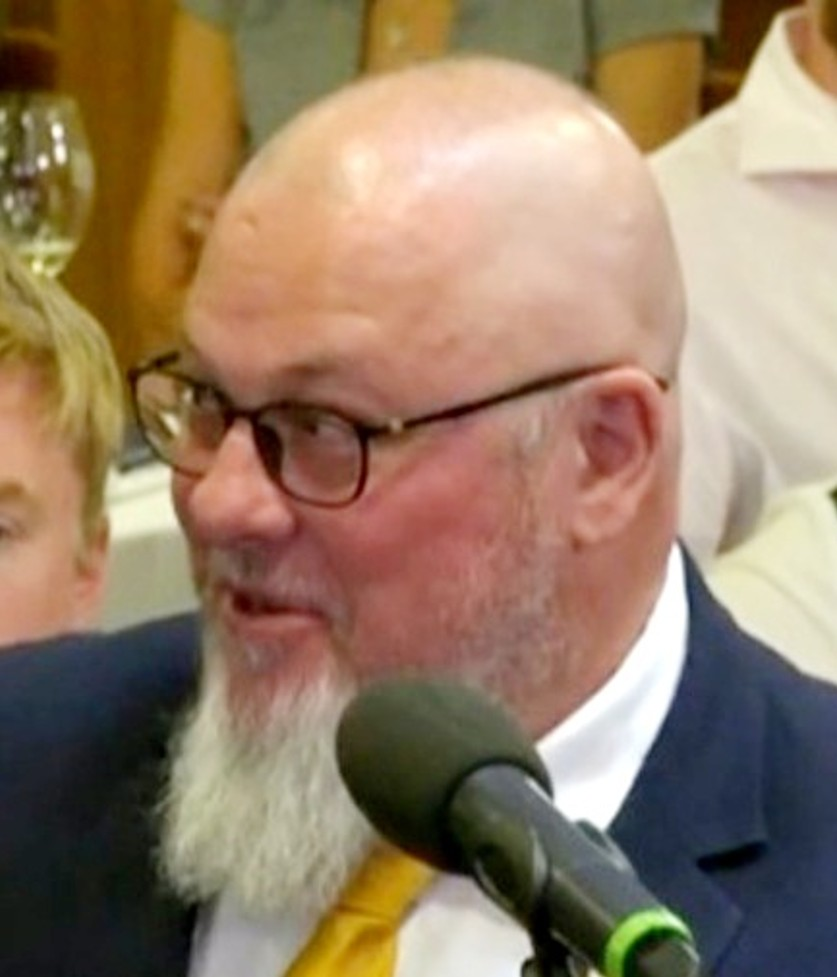
- Born: 15 February 1970 (age 56); Penrith, NSW, Australia
- Education: Kingswood Public School; Parramatta State School; Cairns State High School; Royal Military College, Duntroon; Deakin University; University of South Australia; University of Canberra; Australian National University
- Occupations: Academic, Political Scientist, and Journalist
- Writing career
- Genres: Political Science, Journalism
- Subjects: Politics, Policy and Public Administration
- Notable works: Road Pricing and Provision (2018); COVID-19 and Foreign Aid: Nationalism and Global Development in a New World Order (2023); Politics, Policy and Public Administration in Theory and Practice: Essays in honour of Professor John Wanna (2021)
- Website: www.politicalscience.com.au

Michael de Percy (born 1970) is the Canberra Press Gallery Correspondent for The Spectator Australia. He is an Australian academic, political scientist, journalist, editor, and political commentator. He is an Adjunct Associate Professor in the Canberra School of Government at the University of Canberra and an Adjunct Senior Research Fellow at the Federation University in Australia. According to Toby James, de Percy co-developed theoretical tools which show how technological and institutional legacies limited the policy options available to deploy new communications technologies in Australia and Canada. He was among the people who supported change in the Australian Broadcasting Legislation amendment in 2017. In 2022 de Percy was appointed to the Australian Research Council's College of Experts. He is a graduate of the Royal Military College, Duntroon where he received the Brigadier W.J. Urquhart Prize as the top Artillery graduate and served as an army officer before becoming an academic.

== Academic career ==
=== Research ===
De Percy's PhD thesis, supervised by John Wanna, developed a model of path-dependent, punctuated equilibrium to facilitate process tracing in a comparison of communications technology policy outcomes in Canada and Australia. He further expanded the research with his article in Policy Studies to also identify policy regimes.

=== Publications ===
De Percy has co-edited scholarly works on transportation policy, public administration, and the impact of the COVID-19 pandemic on foreign aid and international relations. His other works include telecommunications policy in Australia and Canada, transport policy, models of government-business relations, populism, institutional exhaustion, and political leadership. He has contributed to the Robert Menzies Institute's biographical volumes on Sir Robert's legacy in Australia's atomic age, communications golden age, and the enduring ethos of God, King, and Country in the Australian Defence Force.

=== Industry Engagement ===
De Percy has served with industry bodies in the transport, telecommunications, and energy sectors. He served as the Chairman of the ACT and Southern NSW Chapter of CILTA from 2023 to 2025, and also as the Vice President of the Telecommunications Association (TelSoc) from 2022 to 2024. He is a member of the Australian Nuclear Association. De Percy collaborated with the Australian Civil-Military Centre on a project on Syrian refugee women in Jordan and Lebanon, where he co-authored three commissioned occasional papers.

=== Teaching ===
As an academic, de Percy taught political science, management, and professional development subjects to undergraduate students in the University of Canberra's programs in Canberra, Singapore, and Hong Kong. He also taught leadership to postgraduate students in the University of Canberra's MBA program in Canberra, Shanghai, Ningbo, and Bhutan. He has edited and written several books and scholarly articles on the topics he taught.

== Journalism and Political Commentary ==
De Percy is a journalist and conservative political commentator. He is the Canberra Press Gallery Correspondent for The Spectator Australia. He is a member of the Canberra Press Gallery. De Percy publishes The Political Flâneur: A Different Point of View (ISSN 2652-8851), a news website which includes his writing and political commentary.

== Fellowships and appointments ==
De Percy is a Fellow of the Royal Society of Arts, a Chartered Fellow of the Chartered Institute of Logistics and Transport, and a Member of the Royal Society of New South Wales. He was appointed as the Editor of the Gallipoli Memorial Club's Gallipoli Gazette on 21 January 2026. De Percy was previously Editor-in-Chief of the Journal of Telecommunications and the Digital Economy. He was appointed to the Australian Research Council's College of Experts on 1 January 2022 and will serve until 27 August 2027.
