= Glen Park, Victoria =

Glen Park
- Suburb
- Interactive map of Glen Park
- Coordinates: 37.5033°S 143.9356°E
- Country: Australia
- State: Victoria
- City: Ballarat
- LGA: City of Ballarat

Government
  - State electorate: Ripon
  - Federal division: Ballarat

Population
  - Total: 110 (2021 census)
- Postcode: 3352
Suburbs around Glen Park
	Chapel Flat
Invermay	Glen Park	Wattle Flat
	Gong Gong

Glen Park is a locality on the Eastern rural fringe of the City of Ballarat municipality in Victoria, Australia. At the 2021 census, Glen Park had a population of 110.
