= Ballarat East =

- Suburb
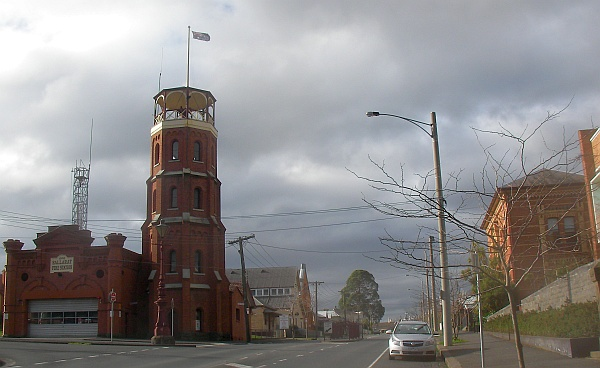
- Former East Ballarat Civic Area on the corner of Barkly and East Streets. The Ballarat Fire Station is on the left, the old library and Ballarat Secondary College are on the right.

- Interactive map of Ballarat East
- Coordinates: 37.5632°S 143.869°E
- Country: Australia
- State: Victoria
- City: Ballarat
- LGA: City of Ballarat
- Location: 3 km (1.9 mi) from Ballarat Central

Government
  - State electorate: Eureka
  - Federal division: Ballarat

Population
  - Total: 5,937 (2021 census)
- Postcode: 3350
Suburbs around Ballarat East
Soldiers Hill	Black Hill	Brown Hill
Bakery Hill	Ballarat East	Eureka, Warrenheip
Golden Point	Canadian	Canadian

Ballarat East is a suburb of Ballarat in Victoria, Australia. From 1857 until 1921 the suburb had its own council (see below). The suburb covers a large area east of the city centre. It is the oldest urban area in Ballarat and was the site of many goldmines, as well as of the Eureka Rebellion.

The population of Ballarat East at the 2021 census was 5,937, making it the fourth most populated suburb in the Ballarat area. The former town retains much of its shambolic character, particularly its winding and unplanned streets which arose organically among the many gold mines. Much of the suburb is subject to heritage protection because of its local historical significance, with many dwellings dating from the 1860s to the 1940s.

== History ==
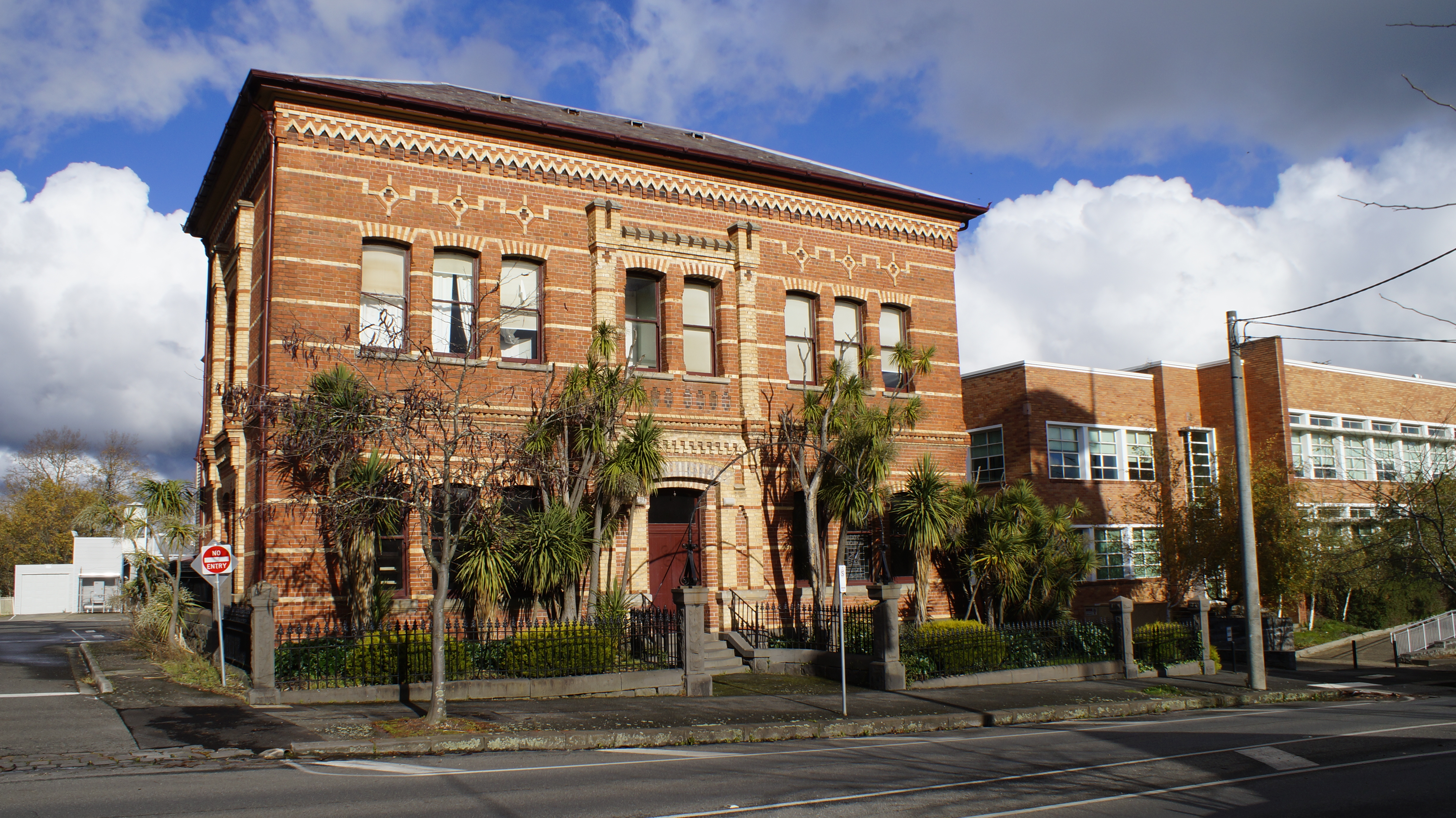
The old Ballarat East public library, located across the street from its original location, level two of the Ballarat East Fire Station

In the 1840s, the Yuille cousins, the first colonists to own land in the region of Ballarat, operated their farm from the rich alluvial plain at the base of Black Hill and south of the Yarrowee River. Historian Weston Bate said the soil was often considered the best in Victoria. This area later became known as Black Hill Flats. The discovery of gold in 1851 led to heavy immigration. Although mining started at Golden Point, within a year the focus shifted to Black Hill Flats. In 1854, in their resistance to an arbitrary tax, gold miners in the area came into armed conflict with the authorities in what became known as the Eureka Rebellion.

Main Street developed into the principal commercial area of the Ballarat district. In the 1850s and 1860s the shops mainly consisted of tents and timber buildings. The latter was largely destroyed by a series of fires during the 1860s, resulting in the commercial area shifting to the area that has become the city centre, specifically Sturt and Lydiard Streets. Humffray Street North, then known as Black Hill Road, was prone to flooding in the 1860s due to the extensive mining operations at Black Hill and Black Hill Flats, which had levelled the terrain south of the Yarrowee River.

The Ballarat East goldfields, which consisted of three distinct areas known as Ballarat East, Ballarat West and Nerrina, produced over 1.9 million ounces of gold from vein systems and over 16 million ounces from adjacent alluvial deposits. At the turn of the 20th century, these alluvial goldfields were the richest ever opened. As these surface deposits were exhausted the quartz reefs at deep levels were exploited and several mines worked at depths exceeding 600 metres.

=== Municipality and township (1857–1921) ===
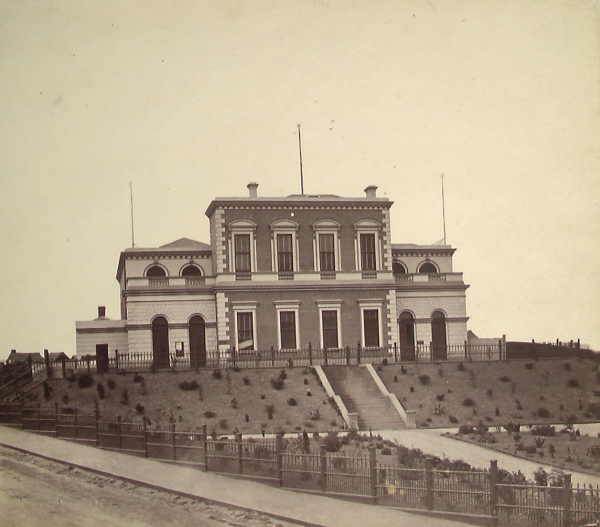
Ballarat East Town Hall in 1862 (demolished in the 1960s)

After the creation of the Ballarat Municipality in 1855 and the Ballarat Road District (covering the surrounding rural area) in 1856, Ballarat East gained municipal government with the creation of the Ballarat East Municipality in 1857 (note that until 1994, local government names were spelled "Ballaarat", whereas the urban settlement and place names have always been spelled "Ballarat"). The Ballarat East Municipality was created as a result of the findings of the commission appointed in 1855 to investigate the grievances of the rebellious miners.

In 1859 the newly formed council acquired land in what was to become the Barkly Street civic area and on 26 December 1861 the foundation stone was laid for the Ballarat East Town Hall, which was built in a Renaissance Revival architecture style and set in formal gardens. It was completed the following year, along with the Ballarat East Free Library next door and the Ballarat East Fire Station, a new headquarters for the fire brigade (formed in 1856) was erected a few years later, in 1864.

The East Ballarat Municipal Council was redesignated as a borough in 1863 and proclaimed a town in 1872 but was absorbed by the Ballarat City Council in 1921 which was in turn amalgamated in 1994 with the Ballarat Shire and parts of the shires of Bungaree, Buninyong, Grenville and Ripon as well as the Sebastopol Borough to form Ballarat City (note the amended spelling of "Ballarat" for the newly formed council).

=== Heritage infrastructure ===
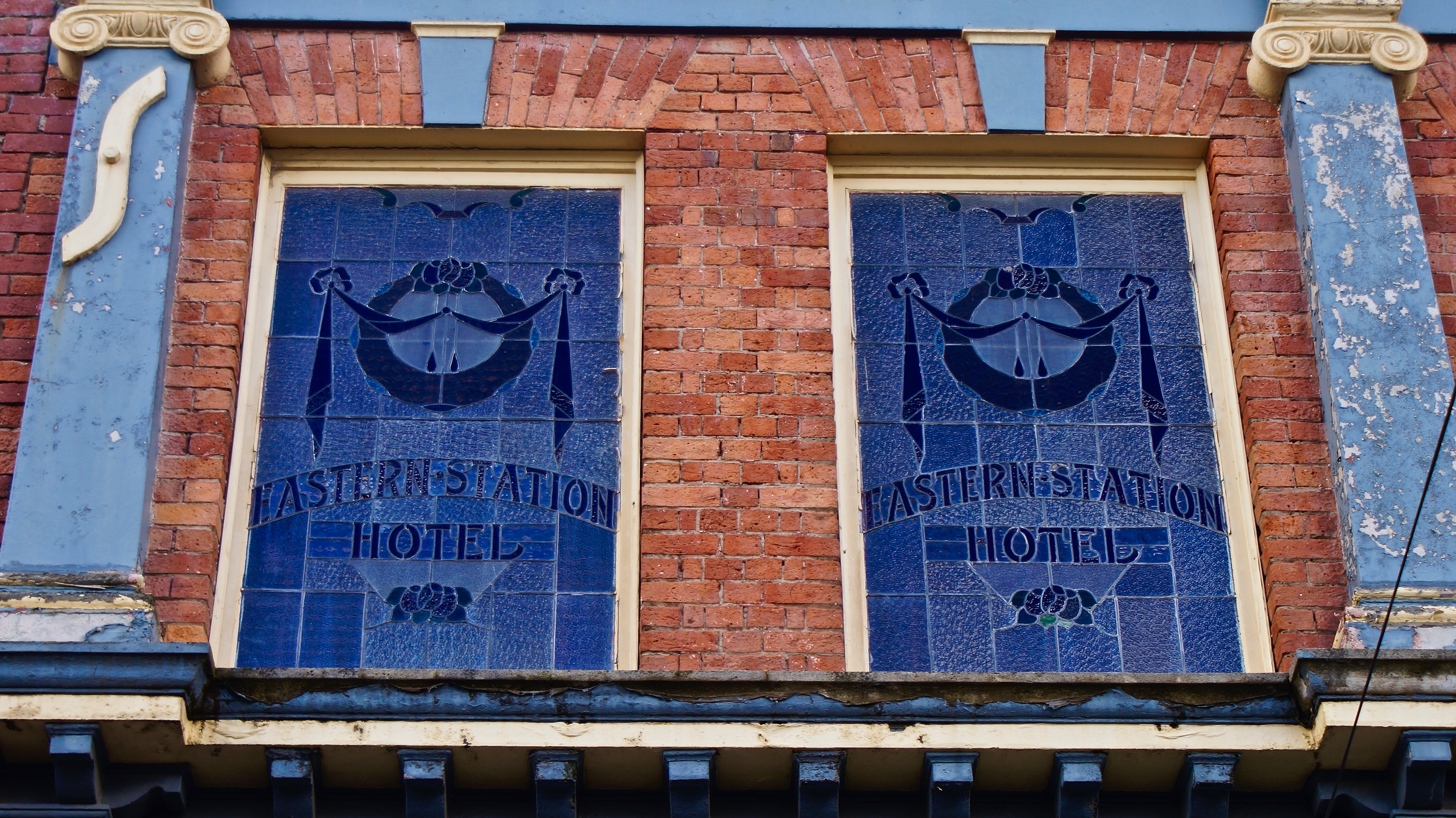
The windows of the old Eastern Station Hotel, which still sports its old name. The building is now a bar and backpackers hostel.

Remnants of the old town still remain, despite much destruction. In 1927 the Ballarat Teachers College moved to the old town hall, however during the great depression the building was mostly unused and was finally demolished in 1946. This was despite years of speculation of its use, finally being used as a girls' school. The gates to the hall's gardens still stand at 41 Barkly Street. The Old Ballarat East Post Office, which opened on 1 December 1857, was replaced by the Bakery Hill office in 1992. The old post office building is situated at 21 Main Road. The Old Ballarat East railway station was built in the 1860s shortly after Ballarat West's station, which still dominates the landscape. The old eastern station became an important junction for branch lines before it closed in the 1960s. Subsequently, the station and its platforms were demolished, however the old goods shed still stands across from the train crossing on Humffray Street North. The crossing itself has been upgraded, but the original gates and tower were not removed. The old Eastern Station Hotel still stands at 81 Humffray Street North.

== Local identity and heritage protection ==
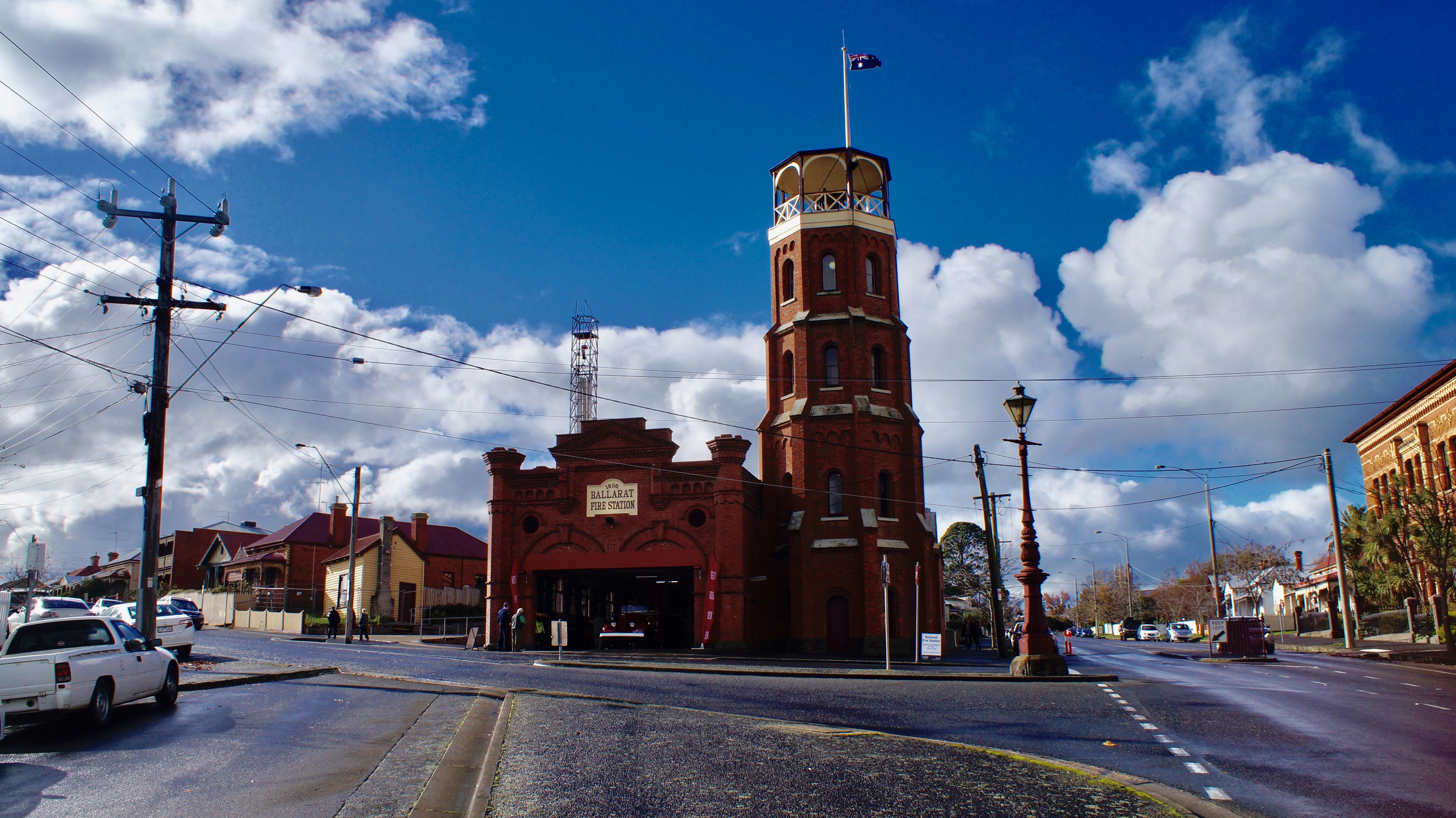
Ballarat East Fire Station, the oldest continually operating fire station in the Southern Hemisphere. It is the site of the first operational telephone, made by Henry Sutton.

Residents of old Ballarat East were known for their determined working-class spirit arising from its traditional poverty. In large part the poverty of the area discouraged the kinds of development experienced in other suburbs of Ballarat, especially in the 1970s and 1980s. As a result, much of the residential and business architecture of Ballarat East still exists from the 1860s through to early 1940s, with tree lined streets and grassy verges (nature strips), as well as bluestone canals. There are numerous heritage overlays placed on much of the East, including the Humffray Street H significance. According to the council's heritage survey, "[t]he particular mining character of this area is important to Ballarat as it retains the atmosphere of an early mining settlement more strongly than elsewhere".

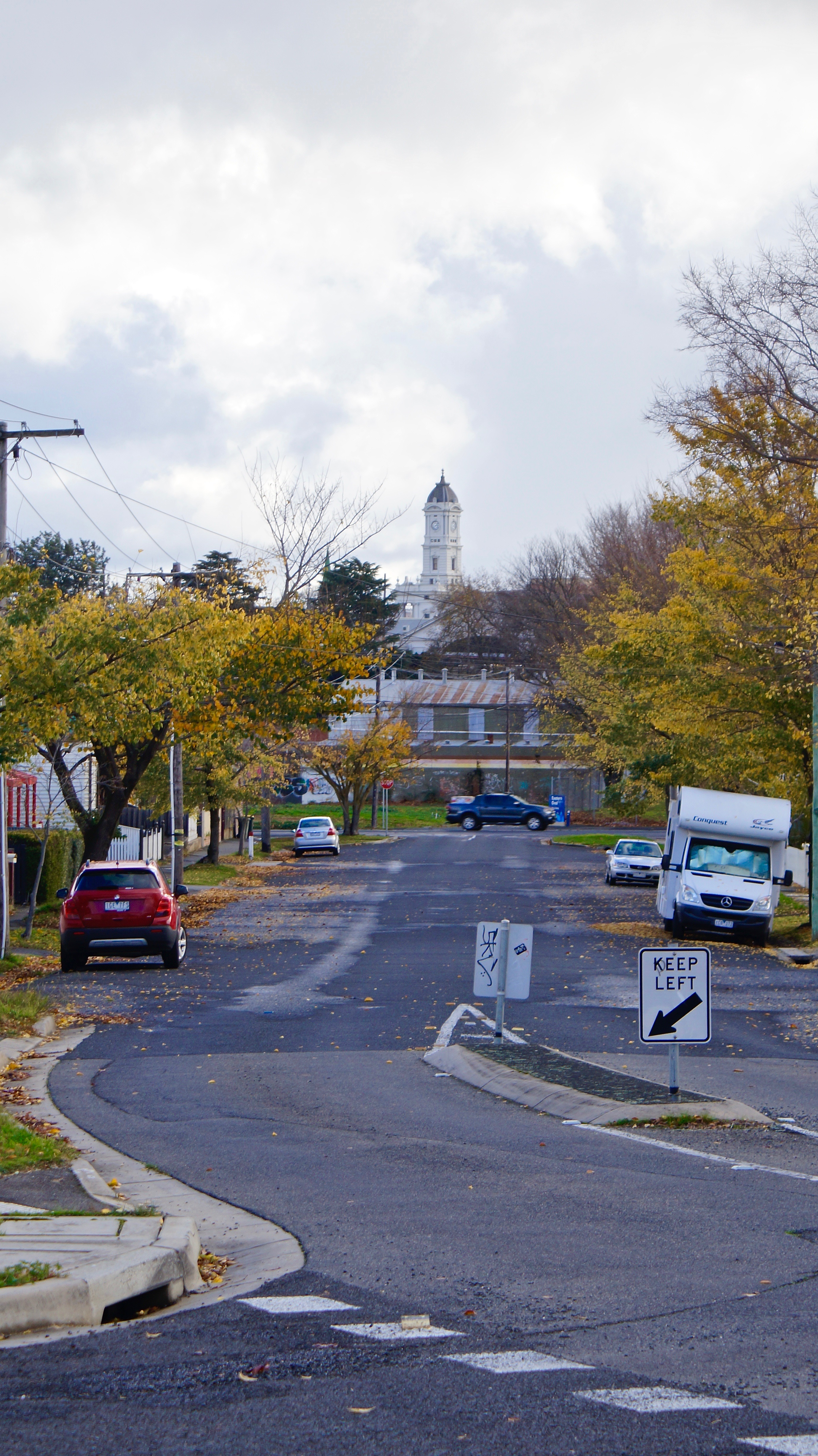
The clock tower of Ballarat station as viewed from Ebden Street in Ballarat East

According to historian Weston Bate in his 1978 work Lucky City: the first generation of Ballarat:

"[T]he tone of the East was strident and individual. It would never willingly be a suburb of Ballarat West. The two co-existed like the head and tail of a coin, looking in different directions and displaying the contrasting imprints of the historical and geographical dies that had made them. Each was a guardian of an aspect of Ballarat’s tradition, and the community as a whole was undoubtedly more meaningful and interesting as a result. It might be thought the East was more Australian because it was less subjected to imported urban forms and institutions and had a restless larrikin quality. Yet the West was probably more typical of what British migrants hoped for in Australia – material success – and it contained large numbers of pioneers who had had the best of both worlds…"

While mining has not been undertaken in the East for some time, the extensive mining that occurred in the 1800s still impacts residents. For example, poorly conceived mine shafts that were not registered at the time have been known to reopen leaving holes in the ground. This is particularly true of properties around Black Hill as well as on the Hill itself, where walkers should not stray from established paths. Mullock piles, containing mine tailings, were once dispersed in order to flatten land for residential dwellings. This has led to elevated arsenic levels in the soil which necessitates residents in certain areas growing fruit and vegetables in elevated garden beds. Some lots on Morres Street North are still vacant because of the contamination.

== Facilities ==
=== Parks and commons ===
Ballarat East is home to many parks, commons and reserves, as well as a golf course and historic oval. The parks include: Eastern Oval, once the only such park, Ballarat Wildlife Park, McKenzie Reserve, Len T. Fraser Reserve, Pennywright Park, Railway Reserve and Webb Avenue Park.

=== Sporting ===
At its furthest west point, East Ballarat is home to the historic Eastern Oval, with its Edwardian grandstands. The oval hosts Australian rules football and cricket matches and is the home of the Ballarat Cricket Association. The stadium is also home to the East Point Football Club of the Ballarat Football League and also the Golden Point Cricket Club and has been mooted as a potential Australian Football League venue. The recreational facility also includes netball courts, as well as the lawn bowls club, Ballarat East Bowling Club and other club facilities. Golfers play at the course of the Mount Xavier Golf Club on Fortune Street.

=== Ballarat Community Garden ===
Created in 2004, the community garden is located on the corner of Queen Street and Dyte Parade - near the old site of the old railway station - and is managed by the Ballarat City Council. Members have access to their own 3x3 metre bed, as well as sheds, toilets and chook yard. An annual harvest festival in autumn is held where locals can buy plants and produce.

=== Transport ===
The main form of transport is the automobile, as well as V/Line trains for commuters to Melbourne. The suburb has several key collector roads. The largest road is Victoria Street (named for Queen Victoria), a dual carriageway which forms the main eastern entrance to Ballarat. In the north is Humffray Street (named for local politician John Basson Humffray), which forms a major east–west route. In the west is Main Road and Barkly Street (named for the Victorian governor Sir Henry Barkly). Along the south is another major east–west route, Eureka Street. Buses provide the only means of public transport and several services are available. Route 8 (Eureka) and 9 (Canadian) travel along Eureka Street, while Route 7 (Brown Hill) service runs along Humffray and Victoria Streets. Route 10 (Buninyong) services part of the western edge along Main Road. Although the Ballarat-Melbourne railway runs the length of the suburb, the local railway station, once an important interchange, located near the Humffray Street level crossing, was closed in the 1960s and has been largely demolished. Ballarat railway station is located near the eastern boundary of Ballarat East and provides regular services to Ararat (The Overland to Adelaide), Maryborough and Melbourne Southern Cross.

=== Education and community ===
Ballarat East is home to Barkly Square, a community centre focusing on education, training and employment outcomes in the Central Highlands and surrounding regions.

The City of Ballarat, in partnership with BGT completed consultations with local community to design an integrated landscape plan and a vision for the site.

== See also ==
- Electoral district of Ballarat East
