= List of places of worship in Golden Plains Shire =

This is a list of places of worship in Golden Plains Shire, a local government area in the state of Victoria, Australia. The list includes active and former churches and other religious buildings representing a variety of Christian denominations and other faiths.

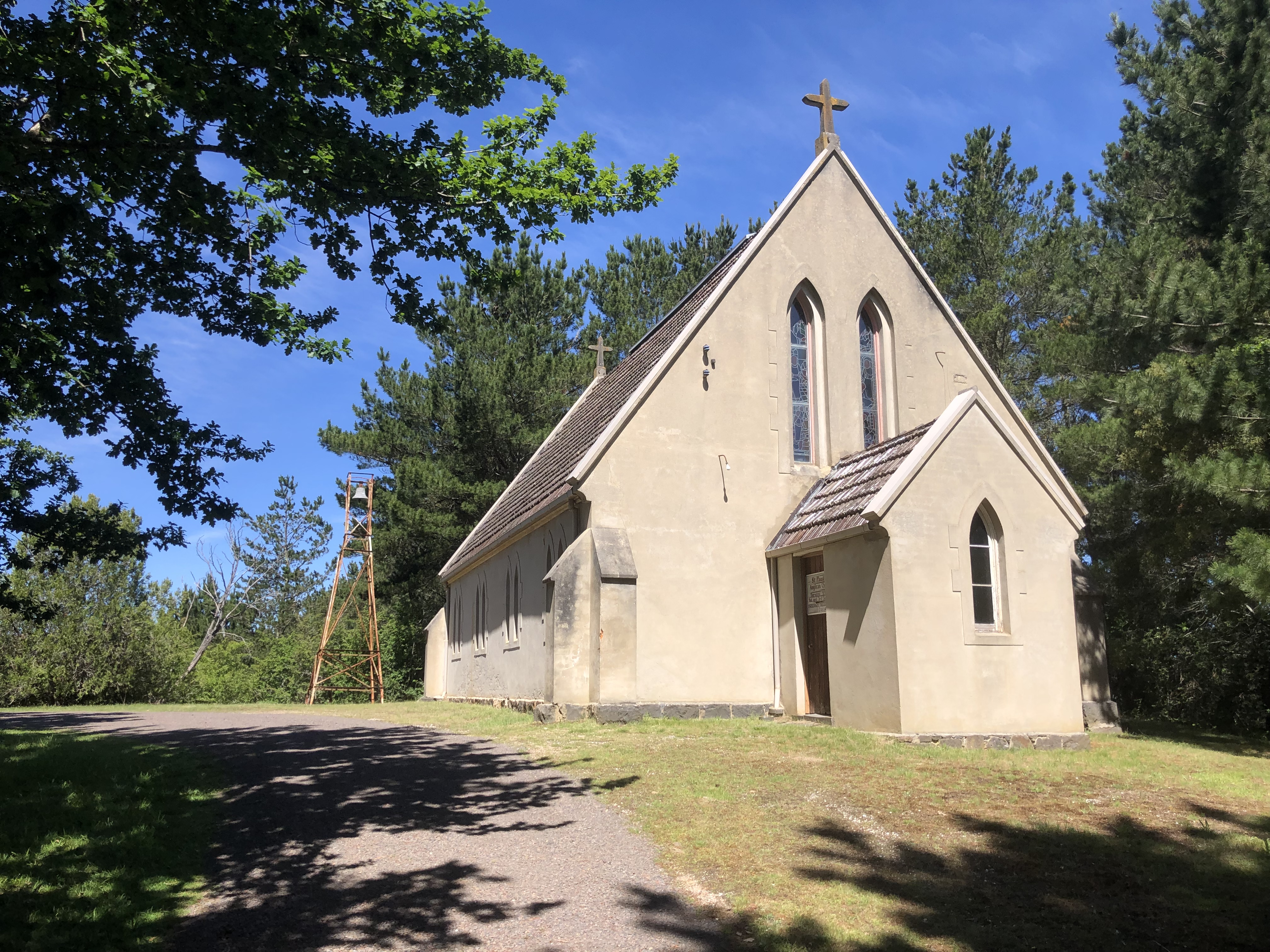
St Paul's Anglican Church, Linton

== Heritage listing status ==
Style	Status
Yes	Listed on the Victorian Heritage Register
–	Not listed

== Current places of worship ==
Current places of worship
Name	Image	Location	Denomination/ Affiliation	Heritage listing	Notes	Refs
St Paul's Anglican Church, Inverleigh		Inverleigh; 38.100694°S 144.055995°E	Anglican	Yes		
Inverleigh Presbyterian Church		Inverleigh; 38.100755°S 144.055328°E	Presbyterian	Yes		
Sacred Heart Catholic Church, Inverleigh		Inverleigh; 38.101136°S 144.052587°E	Catholic	Yes		
St John's Anglican Church, Bannockburn		Bannockburn; 38.048110°S 144.172109°E	Anglican	–		
St Mary MacKillop Catholic Church, Bannockburn		Bannockburn; 38.046557°S 144.170418°E	Catholic	–		
Bannockburn Presbyterian Church		Bannockburn; 38.048714°S 144.172346°E	Presbyterian	–		
St Andrew's Uniting Church, Meredith		Meredith; 37.847179°S 144.076138°E	Uniting (formerly Presbyterian)	Yes		
Church of the Epiphany, Meredith		Meredith; 37.84369°S 144.07753°E	Anglican	Yes		
St Joseph's Catholic Church, Meredith		Meredith; 37.843624°S 144.072251°E	Catholic	Yes		
St Peter's Catholic Church, Linton		Linton; 37.685058°S 143.559379°E	Catholic	Yes		
St Paul's Anglican Church, Linton		Linton; 37.689308°S 143.563624°E	Anglican	Yes		
Teesdale Presbyterian Church		Teesdale; 38.02928°S 144.04607°E	Presbyterian	Yes		
Teesdale Baptist Monastery		Teesdale; 38.019893°S 144.042917°E	Baptist	–		

== Former places of worship ==
Former places of worship
Name	Image	Location	Denomination/ Affiliation	Heritage listing	Notes	Refs
Inverleigh Methodist Church		Inverleigh; 38.102696°S 144.059037°E	Methodist	Yes		
St Andrew's Anglican Church, Murgheboluc		Murgheboluc; 38.105649°S 144.139769°E	Anglican	Yes		
Shelford Presbyterian Church		Shelford; 38.013485°S 143.981757°E	Presbyterian	Yes		
Shelford Methodist Church		Shelford; 38.014682°S 143.974087°E	Methodist	Yes		
Russells Bridge Presbyterian Church		Russells Bridge; 38.016793°S 144.181710°E	Presbyerian	Yes		
St Paul's Anglican Church, Maude		Maude; 37.952681°S 144.168259°E	Anglican	–		
St Mary's Catholic Church, Lethbridge		Lethbridge; 37.968576°S 144.140553°E	Catholic	Yes		
Lethbridge Uniting Church		Lethbridge; 37.966076°S 144.131894°E	Uniting (formerly Methodist)	Yes		
St Thomas' Catholic Church, Steiglitz		Steiglitz; 37.876319°S 144.174943°E	Catholic	Yes		
St Paul's Anglican Church, Steiglitz		Steiglitz; 37.877848°S 144.179122°E	Anglican	Yes		
Rokewood Uniting Church		Rokewood; 37.900530°S 143.721208°E	Uniting (formerly Presbyterian)	Yes		
St Patrick's Catholic Church, Rokewood		Rokewood; 37.899647°S 143.718819°E	Catholic	Yes		
Meredith Free Presbyterian Church		Meredith; 37.839108°S 144.069159°E	Free Presbyterian	Yes		
Black Lead Uniting Church		Cambrian Hill; 37.651008°S 143.826535°E	Uniting (formerly Methodist)	Yes		
St Aidan's Anglican Church (Berringa Anglican Church)		Berringa; 37.777030°S 143.698990°E	Anglican	Yes		
St Mary's Catholic Church, Smythesdale		Smythesdale; 37.643833°S 143.685503°E	Catholic	Yes		
Scarsdale Presbyterian Church		Scarsdale; 37.670874°S 143.656959°E	Presbyterian	–		
Linton Methodist Church		Linton; 37.688133°S 143.563237°E	Methodist	Yes		
Linton Presbyterian Church		Linton; 37.690842°S 143.558748°E	Presbyterian	Yes		
St Patrick's Catholic Church, Springdallah		Springdallah; 37.743447°S 143.634816°E	Catholic	Yes		
St John's Anglican Church, Corindhap		Corindhap; 37.873372°S 143.738550°E	Anglican	Yes		
St Agnes' Anglican Church, Wallinduc		Wallinduc; 37.860152°S 143.511827°E	Anglican	Yes		
Ross Creek Welsh Chapel		Ross Creek; 37.651797°S 143.753390°E	Congregational	Yes		

== See also ==
- List of places of worship in Colac Otway Shire
- List of places of worship in Buloke Shire
