= Gheringhap =

Gheringhap Victoria
- Coordinates: 38°05′0″S 144°14′0″E
- Population: 132 (SAL 2021)
- Postcode(s): 3331
- Location: 82 km (51 mi) SW of Melbourne; 16 km (10 mi) NW of Geelong
- LGA(s): Golden Plains Shire
- State electorate(s): Polwarth
- Federal division(s): Corio
Localities around Gheringhap:
Bannockburn	Sutherlands Creek	Moorabool
Bannockburn	Gheringhap	Batesford
Bannockburn	Stonehaven	Stonehaven

Gheringhap (/dʒɛrɪŋhæp/) is a locality in the Golden Plains Shire, Victoria, Australia. It is located approximately 83 km southwest of Melbourne, between Geelong and Meredith on the Midland Highway.

The locality is located at the junction of the Geelong-Ballarat railway and the Western standard gauge railway which connects Melbourne and Adelaide. A webcam near the rail line, operated by rail enthusiasts, records all train movements for publication. The camera was investigated by the Bureau of Infrastructure, Transport and Regional Economics as an example of enthusiast cameras as a potential source of more reliable traffic data than records provided by operators.

Gheringhap Post Office opened on 1 April 1869 and closed in 1968. Gheringhap School opened in 1858 and closed in 1906 due to falling attendances.

Hap means place in the local native language Gheran - timber. Moolap - Mool hap.
