= Moorabool (disambiguation) =

Moorabool is an outer suburb of Geelong, Victoria, Australia.

Moorabool may also refer to several other things in Victoria, Australia:

- Moorabool railway station, a former station on the Geelong–Ballarat line
- Moorabool River
- Moorabool Wind Farm
- Shire of Moorabool, a local government area to the west of Melbourne, centred on Ballan
