= Bannockburn, Victoria =

Bannockburn
- Town
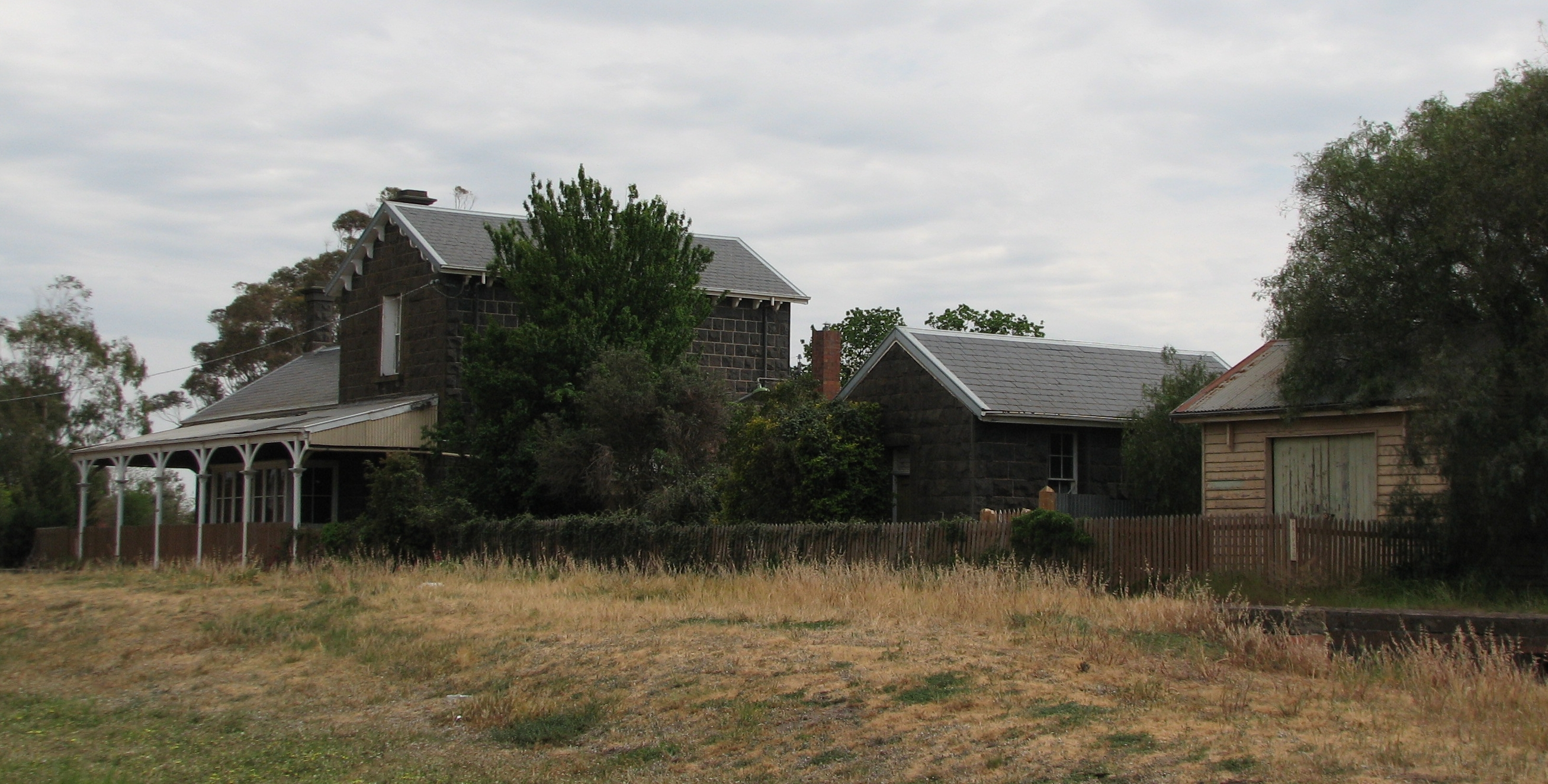
- Former railway station

- Coordinates: 38°03′0″S 144°10′0″E
- Country: Australia
- State: Victoria
- LGA: Golden Plains Shire
- Location: 88 km (55 mi) from Melbourne; 23 km (14 mi) from Geelong; 72 km (45 mi) from Ballarat

Government
  - State electorate: Geelong
  - Federal division: Corio
- Elevation: 237 m (778 ft)

Population
  - Total: 6,470 (2021 census)
- Postcode: 3331
- Mean max temp: 18.9 °C (66.0 °F)
- Mean min temp: 8.5 °C (47.3 °F)
- Annual rainfall: 502.1 mm (19.77 in)
Localities around Bannockburn
Lethbridge	Russells Bridge	Sutherlands Creek
Teesdale	Bannockburn	Gheringhap
Inverleigh	Murgheboluc	Stonehaven

Bannockburn is a town located near Geelong, Victoria, Australia, approximately 88 km southwest of Melbourne. It is situated within the Golden Plains Shire. According to the 2021 census, Bannockburn had a population of 6,470.

== History ==
The township, originally named Leigh Road, was founded in the early 1850s. It is presumed to have been named after the 14th century battle site in Scotland, and grew as a coaching stop during the 1850s and 1860s, when the main route to the Ballarat goldfields was via the port of Geelong. The railway came to the town with the opening of the Geelong-Ballarat line in 1862. The local railway station was originally called Leigh Road but the name was changed to Bannockburn in 1904. Today, only grain and freight trains use the line.

The township grew around the station and a post office, called Leigh Road Railway Station, opened on 18 May 1863. It was renamed Leigh Road in 1873, Wabdallah in 1875, and finally Bannockburn in 1892.

St John's Anglican Church located on Byron Street, was built in 1878.

Bannockburn township contains notable examples of Victorian colonial architecture, such as the former Somerset Hotel (1854), now a private home, and the Bannockburn Railway Station (1863). The former Bannockburn Lock Up in Victor Street (1860) was relocated from Lethbridge to its present site in 1869. In the 1940s, the lock up's adjoining police station residence became a farmhouse at a Hills Road property in Batesford. Both the railway station and former lock up are listed on the Victorian Heritage Register.

In 1942, the United States Army established the Kane Ammunition/Ordnance Depot in order to assist with their operations in the Pacific Theatre of World War II. The base, located in the triangular slice of land between Brislane Road, Harvey Road and the Western standard gauge railway line in Murgheboluc, served as a storage centre and a maintenance workshop for ordnance materials used in the war. A railway siding was also set aside for a mustard gas depository, with mustard gas also being stored at the site. The base disappeared by 1942, and whilst there are only a few elements of concrete infrastructure left, the base is immortalised by an adjacent road, known as 'Old Base Road'.

== Governance ==
Bannockburn Road District (an early form of local government in Victoria) was established on 31 October 1862 and was redesignated as a shire on 30 June 1864. The shire absorbed Meredith Shire on 15 September 1915 and part of the shire's Steiglitz riding was transferred to Corio Shire on 31 May 1916.

On 18 May 1993 part of Bannockburn Shire was amalgamated with part of Barrabool Shire and with Bellarine Rural City, Corio Shire, Geelong City, Geelong West City, Newtown City and South Barwon City to form City of Greater Geelong local government area.

On 6 May 1994 the remainder of Bannockburn Shire, including Bannockburn itself, was amalgamated with parts of Ballan Shire, Buninyong Shire, Grenville Shire and the whole of Leigh S to form Golden Plains Shire.

== Present day ==
The nearby Bannockburn Vineyards is located on the Midland Highway, established in 1974 by Stuart Hooper. Grapes grown include cabernet sauvignon, chardonnay, malbec, merlot, pinot noir, riesling, sauvignon blanc and shiraz.

The Golden Plains Farmers' Market occurs at Bannockburn on the first Saturday of every month. It offers goods such as fresh vegetables, breads, wine, and hardware, among other things. The market also features live music and other entertainment.

The town has a public college (Bannockburn P-12 College) as well as a Catholic primary school (St Mary MacKillop Catholic Primary School). It is also the site of a local branch of the Geelong Regional Library Corporation.

== Climate ==
Bannockburn has an oceanic climate (Köppen: Cfb), with warm summers and cool winters. Average maxima vary from 26.1 °C (79.0 °F) in January to 12.3 °C (54.1 °F) in July while average minima fluctuate between 12.6 °C (54.7 °F) in January and February and 5.1 °C (41.2 °F) in July. Mean average annual precipitation is moderately: 502.1 mm (19.77 in), but is somewhat frequent: spread between 147.3 precipitation days. Extreme temperatures have ranged from 45.2 °C (113.4 °F) on 7 February 2009 to −4.2 °C (24.4 °F) on 24 July 1994. All climate data was sourced from She Oaks, a rural locality 16 kilometres (9.9 mi) north of Bannockburn.

Climate data for Bannockburn (sourced from She Oaks) (37.91°S 144.13°E, 237 m AMSL) (1990-2024 normals & extremes)
Month	Jan	Feb	Mar	Apr	May	Jun	Jul	Aug	Sep	Oct	Nov	Dec	Year
Record high °C (°F)	43.7 (110.7)	45.2 (113.4)	39.3 (102.7)	33.4 (92.1)	26.6 (79.9)	23.6 (74.5)	20.8 (69.4)	23.6 (74.5)	28.4 (83.1)	35.2 (95.4)	39.1 (102.4)	42.0 (107.6)	45.2 (113.4)
Mean daily maximum °C (°F)	26.1 (79.0)	25.5 (77.9)	23.1 (73.6)	19.2 (66.6)	15.6 (60.1)	12.9 (55.2)	12.3 (54.1)	13.5 (56.3)	15.5 (59.9)	18.3 (64.9)	21.1 (70.0)	23.8 (74.8)	18.9 (66.0)
Mean daily minimum °C (°F)	12.6 (54.7)	12.6 (54.7)	11.2 (52.2)	8.9 (48.0)	7.2 (45.0)	5.6 (42.1)	5.1 (41.2)	5.4 (41.7)	6.2 (43.2)	7.3 (45.1)	9.1 (48.4)	10.5 (50.9)	8.5 (47.3)
Record low °C (°F)	2.0 (35.6)	2.9 (37.2)	−0.9 (30.4)	−2.2 (28.0)	−2.9 (26.8)	−3.5 (25.7)	−4.2 (24.4)	−3.1 (26.4)	−2.5 (27.5)	−1.8 (28.8)	−1.0 (30.2)	−0.6 (30.9)	−4.2 (24.4)
Average precipitation mm (inches)	39.3 (1.55)	36.1 (1.42)	25.5 (1.00)	39.0 (1.54)	37.9 (1.49)	41.4 (1.63)	39.3 (1.55)	42.8 (1.69)	46.8 (1.84)	59.2 (2.33)	60.6 (2.39)	34.1 (1.34)	502.1 (19.77)
Average precipitation days (≥ 0.2 mm)	7.8	7.1	8.5	11.0	14.7	15.6	17.7	16.6	15.7	13.5	10.4	8.7	147.3
Average afternoon relative humidity (%)	47	48	49	54	66	72	70	65	63	58	56	48	58
Average dew point °C (°F)	10.3 (50.5)	10.6 (51.1)	9.3 (48.7)	7.8 (46.0)	7.6 (45.7)	6.7 (44.1)	5.7 (42.3)	5.5 (41.9)	6.4 (43.5)	7.0 (44.6)	8.8 (47.8)	8.6 (47.5)	7.9 (46.1)
Source: Bureau of Meteorology (1990-2024 normals & extremes)

== Sport ==
=== Australian rules football ===
The town has an Australian rules football and netball club, the Bannockburn Football & Netball Club. Their teams are known as the Tigers, competing in the Geelong & District Football Netball League.

=== Lawn bowls ===
Bannockburn and District Bowls Club is located in the town.

=== Cricket ===
The town has a cricket club called the Bannockburn Bulls.

=== Golf ===
Golfers play at the Bannockburn Golf Club on Teesdale Road.

=== Soccer ===
Bannockburn has a soccer team called the Golden Plains Soccer Club, formed in 2012. They compete in the Victorian State League Division 5, which is the seventh level of soccer in Victoria and the eighth in Australia.
