= Lethbridge railway station =

Former railway station in Victoria, Australia

Coordinates: 37°58′04″S 144°07′50″E

Lethbridge
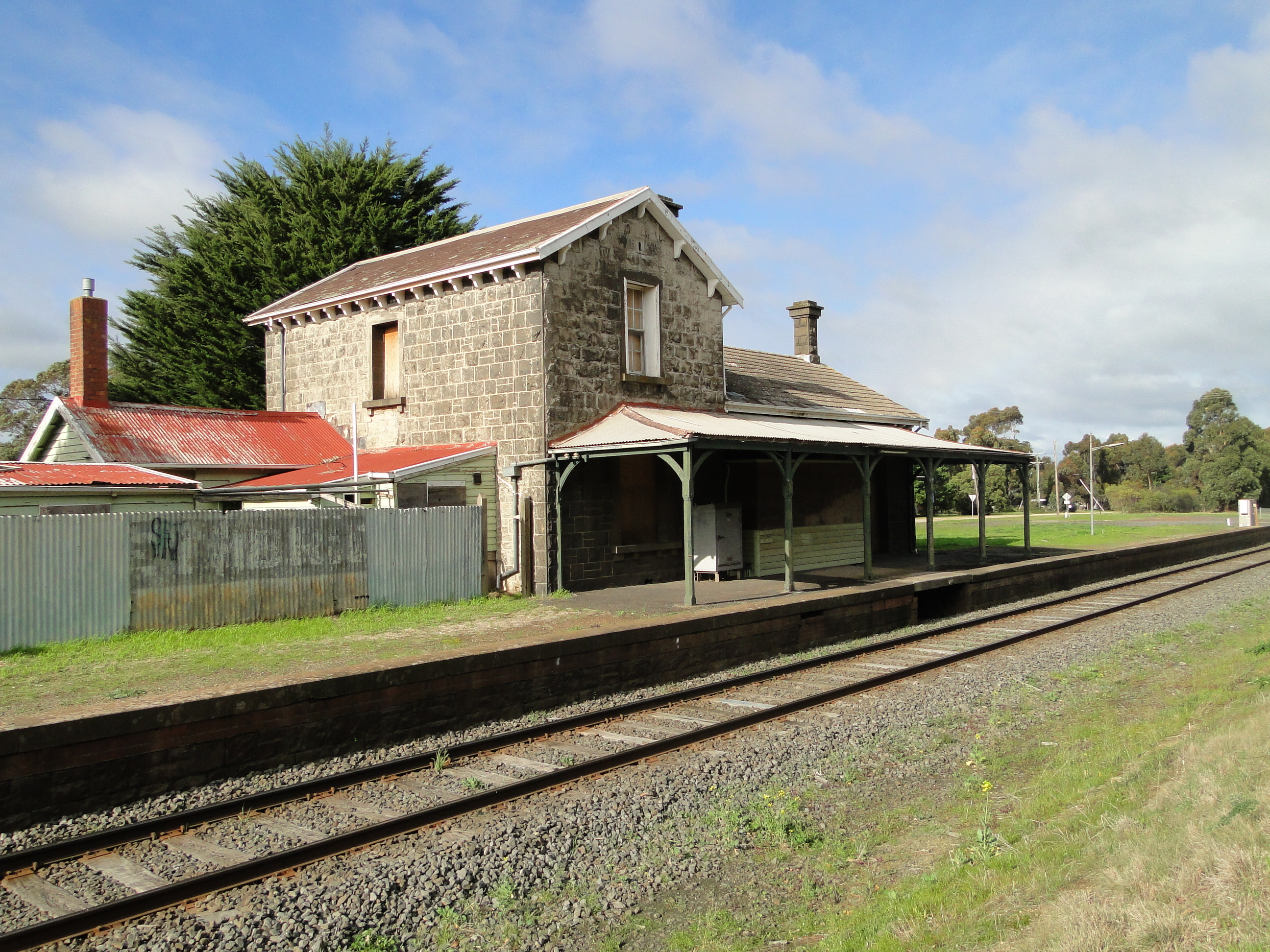

General information
- Owner: VicTrack
- Line: Geelong-Ballarat
- Platforms: 1
- Tracks: 1

Other information
- Status: Closed

Services
Preceding station	Disused railways	Following station
Bannockburn	Geelong-Ballarat line	Meredith
	List of closed railway stations in Victoria	
Location

Lethbridge Railway Station is a railway station on the Geelong-Ballarat railway line located in the township of Lethbridge, Victoria, Australia. It was built in 1862 by contractors John Campbell and Co. Currently, only freight trains pass the station, as the V/Line passenger trains have been replaced by a bus service.

While the main bluestone station building is currently boarded up, as per VicTrack's "Community use of vacant rail buildings" program, the historic building will be restored into a multi-purpose community arts and cultural hub. This project has been in the works for many years and construction is scheduled to be completed or underway by the end of 2023.
