= Sutherlands Creek =

- Town
- Coordinates: 38°00′0″S 144°13′0″E
- Country: Australia
- State: Victoria
- LGA: Golden Plains Shire
- Location: 84 km (52 mi) W of Melbourne; 23 km (14 mi) N of Geelong

Government
  - State electorate: Polwarth
  - Federal division: Corio

Population
  - Total: 129 (SAL 2021)
- Postcode: 3331
Localities around Sutherlands Creek
Maude	Maude	Anakie
Russells Bridge	Sutherlands Creek	Anakie; Moorabool
Bannockburn	Gheringhap	Moorabool

Sutherlands Creek is a locality in Victoria, Australia. The locality is in the Golden Plains Shire, near the regional city of Geelong and 84 kilometres (52 mi) west of the state capital, Melbourne. At the 2016 census, Sutherlands Creek had a population of 108.

Sutherlands Creek Post Office opened on 15 February 1860 and closed in 1960.
