= Moorabool railway station =

Former railway station in Victoria, Australia

Coordinates: 38°04′30″S 144°17′53″E

Moorabool
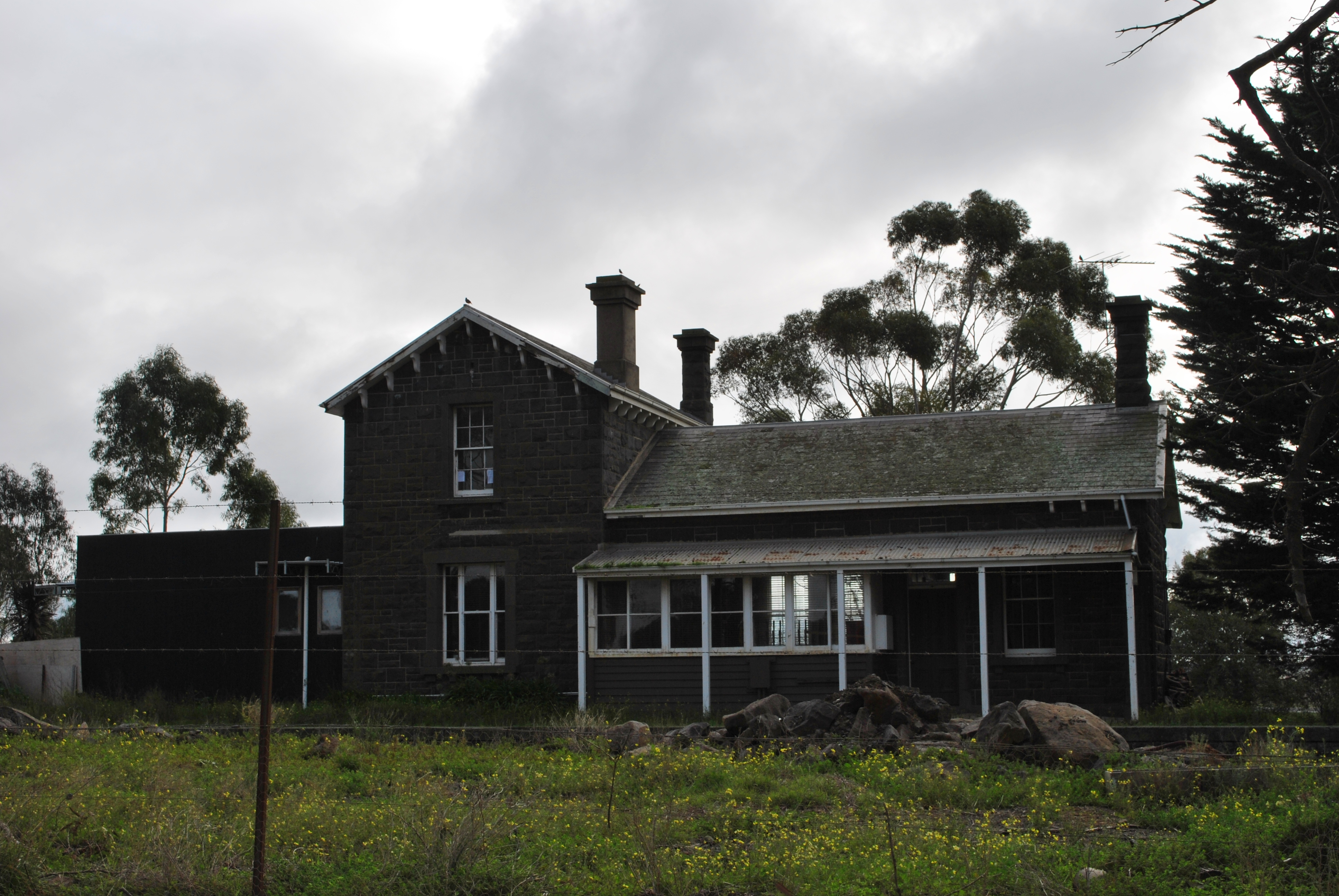
- Moorabool station building, 2012

General information
- Line: Geelong-Ballarat
- Platforms: 1
- Tracks: 1

Other information
- Status: Closed

History
- Closed: 21 December 1976

Services
Preceding station	Disused railways	Following station
North Shore	Geelong-Ballarat line	Gheringhap
	List of closed railway stations in Victoria	
Location

Moorabool is a closed railway station on the Geelong–Ballarat railway line, in the locality of Moorabool, Victoria, Australia. Until 1864 it was called Steiglitz Road. The station building was constructed for the Victorian Railways in 1861, by a private contractor, and comprises a single-storey, gable-roofed, bluestone station building, with an attached two-storey residence.

The station was closed to all traffic on 21 December 1976, but is still passed by The Overland and freight trains. The station building was sold in 1977 and currently serves as a private residence. The building is listed on the Victorian Heritage Register and the Register of the National Estate. It is located about 1.6 km east of another heritage railway structure, the Moorabool Viaduct.
