= Lethbridge, Victoria =

Lethbridge
- Town
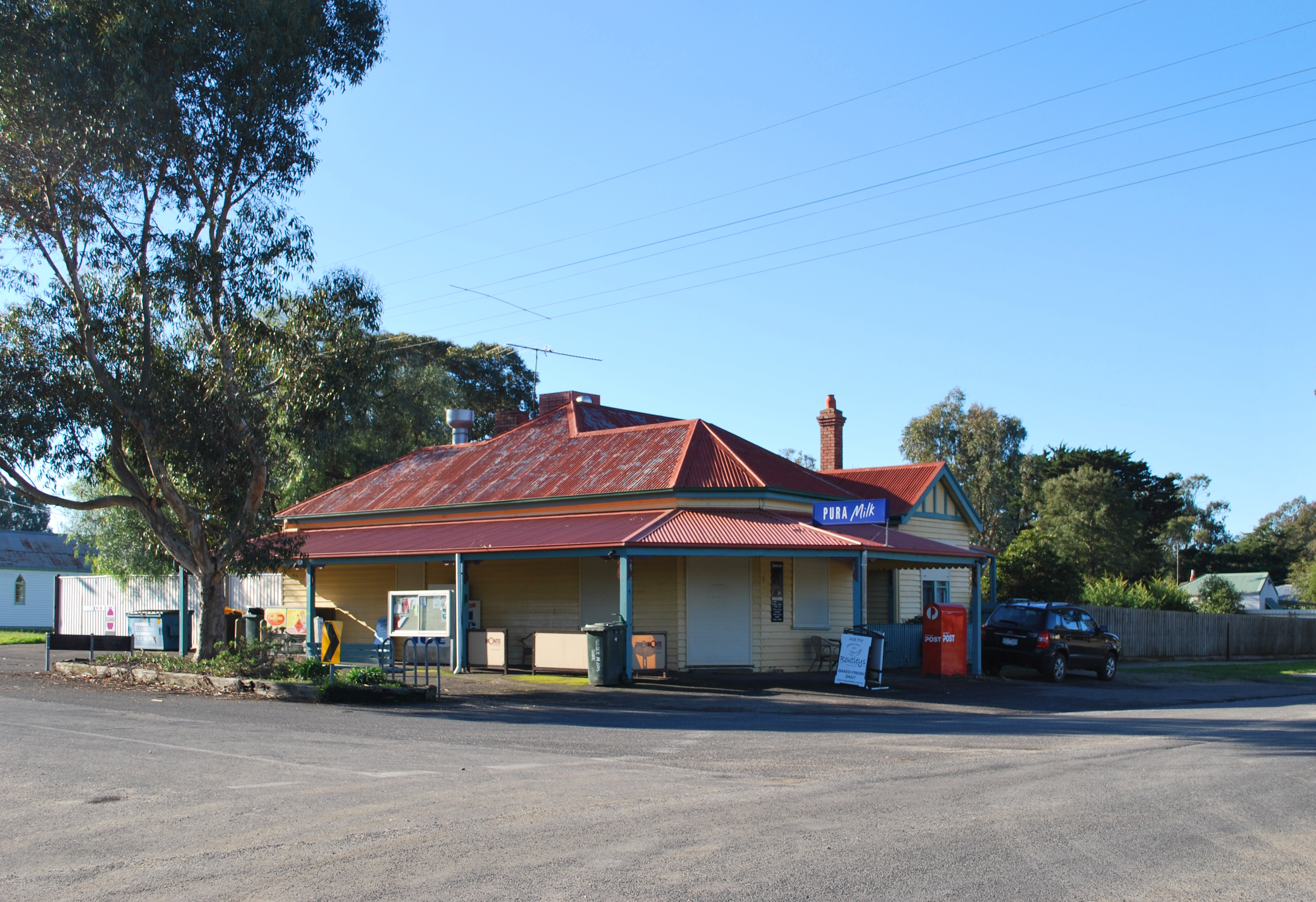
- General store

- Coordinates: 37°58′0″S 144°08′0″E
- Country: Australia
- State: Victoria
- LGA: Golden Plains Shire
- Location: 95 km (59 mi) W of Melbourne; 31 km (19 mi) N of Geelong; 59 km (37 mi) SE of Ballarat; 17 km (11 mi) S of Meredith; 11 km (6.8 mi) N of Bannockburn

Government
  - State electorate: Eureka
  - Federal division: Ballarat

Population
  - Total: 1,181 (2021 census)
- Postcode: 3332
Localities around Lethbridge
Meredith	Meredith	She Oaks
Bamganie	Lethbridge	Maude
Shelford	Teesdale	Russells Bridge; Bannockburn

Lethbridge is a town in Golden Plains Shire, Victoria, Australia. Bluestone from Lethbridge quarries was used to build several significant buildings in Melbourne, including the steps to the Parliament House. At the 2016 census, Lethbridge had a population of 1,014.

Lethbridge Post Office opened on 10 September 1857 and closed in 1980.

== History ==
The rural township was formally named Muddy Water Holes, the original name was most likely because of the line of ponds across Bruce's Creek. In 1854 the township was proclaimed and named as Lethbridge. Lethbridge was along the horse and carriage tracks that connected Geelong and Ballarat to connect Geelong's port access with Ballarat's goldfields, which became the primary route between the two cities which is now Midland Highway.

The railway came to the town with the opening of the Geelong-Ballarat line in 1862, with the local railway station opened soon after, but today only grain and fruit trains use the line.

Throughout the 19th century, Lethbridge became a growing community. Multiple schools including a catholic school and a Presbyterian school opened up, however, they were all shut down when the township introduced a government school in 1874, known now as Lethbridge Primary School. The original site for Lethbridge Primary School continued to be used up until 2010, the school was relocated to a brand new premise in Stephenson Street, the original bluestone schoolhouse still remains intact at the former site.

Local bluestone was sourced from Lethbridge quarries, the shire hall in Bannockburn and the war memorial in Inverleigh have also used bluestone in their construction. Football, cricket clubs, and even a mechanics' institute were introduced to Lethbridge.

Lethbridge introduced its first Catholic church built in 1859–1860, St Mary's Church. Before the 1860s Lethbridge was included in the parish of St Mary's Geelong. Lethbridge Uniting Church was built in 1868–69, originally built on the Midland Highway but later relocated to opposite the local railway station. The sites for both St Mary's church and Lethbridge uniting church still exist today,

Moranghurk, a Lethbridge homestead dating from approximately the 1840s, located on the Midland Highway, is listed on the Victorian Heritage Register. The Moranghurk shearer's quarters have been restored and can accommodate up to 30 guests.

During the 1900s, Lethbridge was not as busy as it once was. A portion of the population were farms settled by soldiers when part of the Moranghurk estate was subdivided during World War II. The population census even recorded a population as low as 172 in 1966.

Peter Lalor, the leader of the Eureka Stockade rebellion, hid overnight in Lethbridge while fleeing from Ballarat to Geelong in November 1854.

George Elmslie, first Labor Premier of Victoria, was born in Lethbridge in 1861.

== Present day ==
Population and activity in Lethbridge has declined since its peak during the mid-19th century. At the 2016 census, Lethbridge had a population of 1,014, as opposed to the 1861 population of 1,267. The predicted population for Lethbridge (and surrounding areas such as Meredith and She Oaks) in 2021 is 2,460 and expected to reach 3,007 in 2041.

The community of Lethbridge has a range of facilities and services including:

- Lethbridge Primary School
- The town hall (which offers community groups including Karate and Cub scouts)
- Lethbridge Airpark
- Sports and Community facility (Lethbridge Recreation Reserve) (with two football ovals and three tennis courts, also offering Playgroup and Community functions. A skate park and playground are located nearby.
- Country Fire Authority
- Lethbridge Lake

Many of the facilities mentioned above are located in one central area, despite Lethbridge being located on the Midland Highway, the central area is located away from the highway. Although the history of Lethbridge is preserved through buildings such as the railway station and old school site. At the Lethbridge lake, the former railway water tank still exists today, used to supply water for steam engines that needed to take on water at the railway station.

== Sports ==
=== Cricket ===
Lethbridge has a cricket club that was established in 1879, playing at the sports facilities.

=== Football ===
Lethbridge offers football teams for junior players, also playing at the sports facilities in Lethbridge.

=== Equestrian ===
Lethbridge has an indoor equestrian arena for horse sports
