= Lethbridge Airpark =

Airport in Victoria, Australia

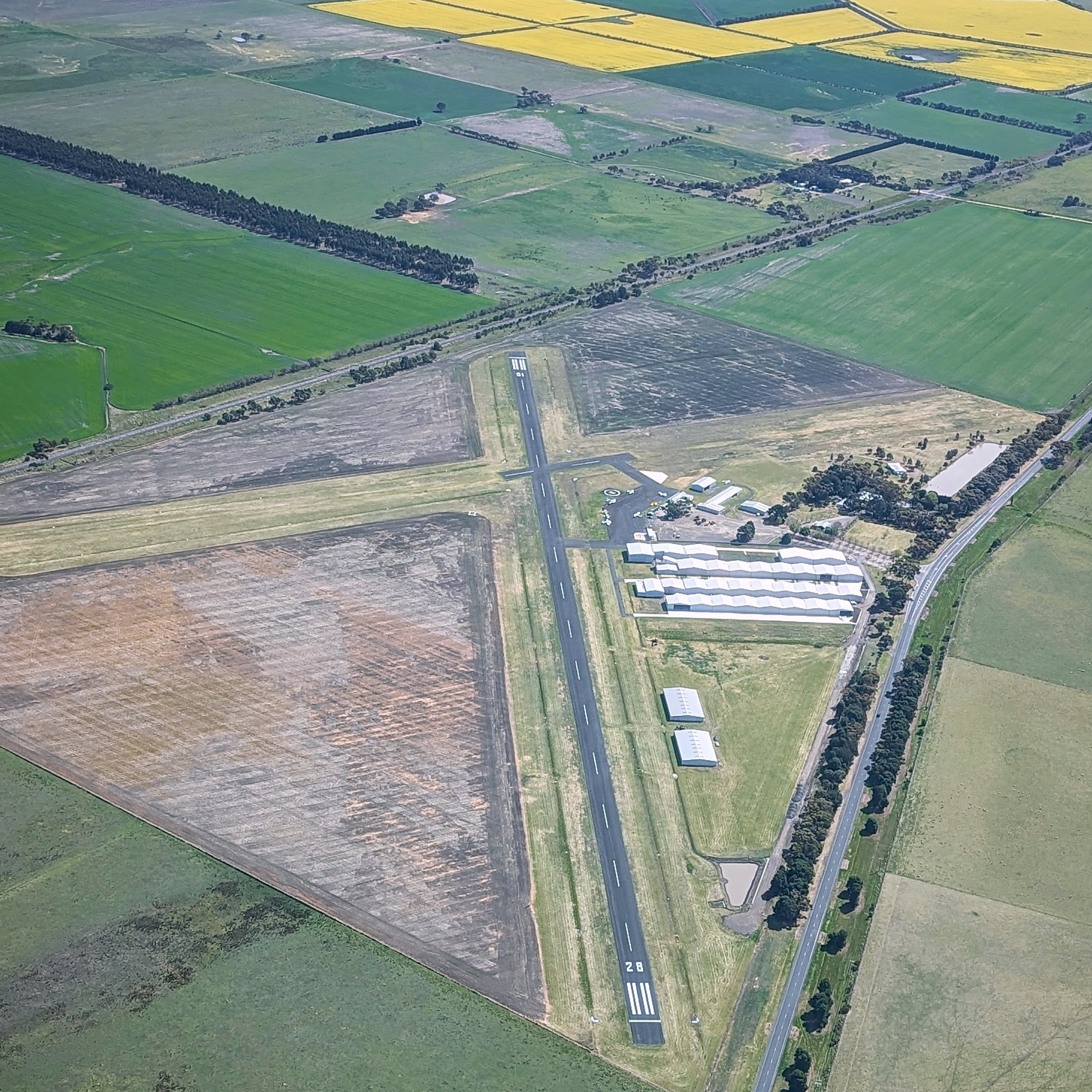
- IATA: none; ICAO: YLED

Summary
- Airport type: Private
- Operator: G & T Baum
- Serves: Geelong
- Location: Lethbridge
- Elevation AMSL: 790 ft / 241 m
- Coordinates: 37°55′18″S 144°06′10″E
- Website: www.lethbridgeairport.com.au

Map
- Location in Victoria

Runways
Direction	Length		Surface
Direction	m	ft	Surface
10/28	1,200	3,937	Bitumen
16/34	1,000	3,281	Grass
- Sources: AIP

Lethbridge Airpark (ICAO: YLED) is a privately owned aerodrome located 6 km (3.7 mi) north of the rural township of Lethbridge between the regional cities of Geelong 35 km (22 mi) to the south and Ballarat 50 km (31 mi) to the north in Victoria, Australia. The 80 ha (198 acres) site caters to private and recreational pilots, and offers flight training. Current facilities at the airport include several hangars, an aircraft maintenance workshop, and basic amenities including toilets and showers.

== History ==
The Airpark was established in 1992 as a private venture with the support of the Golden Plains Shire on a site that was carefully selected to take advantage of unrestricted airspace, existing transportation links and distance from urban development. The first tenant was the Geelong Sports Aviators Club, relocating to Lethbridge in the same year, following the sale and closure of the airfield at Lovely Banks. An aircraft maintenance provider has operated at the airfield since 1993.

From 1996, safety improvements including an observation tower to assist with flight training and fire fighting services including a water reserve and increased pumping capacity were progressively added. By 2002, traffic had grown to a level to warrant the establishment of a discrete Common traffic advisory frequency to allow pilots to co-ordinate movements on and around the airfield. In 2006 Alpine Aircraft Sales, the Australian distributor for Alpi Aviation and Just Aircraft relocated operations to a purpose-built hangar at Lethbridge Airpark. By 2008, there were 50 aircraft based at Lethbridge.

== Expansion ==
In July 2013, the Victoria State Government announced a grant of $1 million to help fund upgrades to the facilities at Lethbridge Airpark. The funds will be used to create a 1,200 m (3,900 ft) × 18 m (59 ft) sealed surface on runway 11/29. The upgrades which also include the installation of a Pilot Activated Lighting system, construction of over 100 hangar sites, a sealed helipad and parking areas will allow larger aircraft such as the Beechcraft B200 King Air used by Air Ambulance Victoria all weather access to the field. A water delivery system for fire fighting aircraft operating for the Country Fire Authority who regularly use the airfield as a staging location is also planned as part of the upgrade, with the remaining costs to be paid by the operator.

The planned upgrades are expected to create more than 100 ongoing jobs, and position the airport as an important year round hub for emergency services aircraft. It is also hoped that aviation related businesses such as aircraft assembly, sales and service will be encouraged to establish themselves at Lethbridge.

== See also ==
- List of airports in Victoria, Australia
- Transport in Australia
