= Teesdale Presbyterian Church =

Presbyterian church in Victoria, Australia

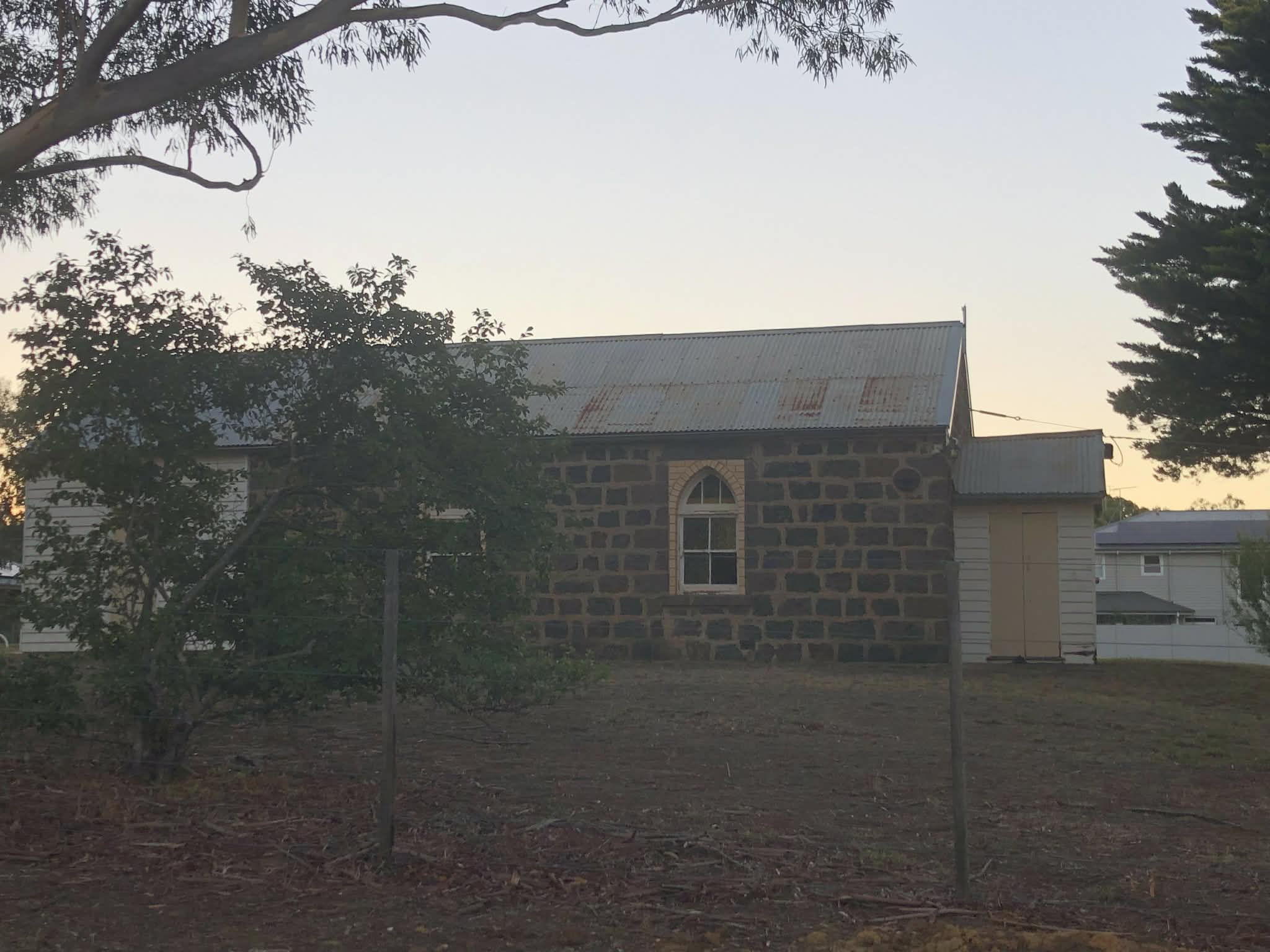
- Teesdale Presbyterian Church
- Teesdale Presbyterian Church
- 38°01′45″S 144°02′46″E
- Location: 42 Pyke Street, Teesdale, Victoria
- Country: Australia
- Denomination: Presbyterian

History
- Status: Active
- Founder: Rev. Simpson

Architecture
- Architectural type: Church
- Style: Astylar
- Years built: 1858

Victorian Heritage Register
- Official name: Teesdale Presbyterian Church
- Type: Local heritage (built and natural)
- Reference no.: H0167

The Teesdale Presbyterian Church is a heritage-listed Presbyterian church located in the town of Teesdale, Victoria, Australia. Constructed in 1858, the bluestone church is one of the earliest surviving buildings in the town.

== History ==
The church was built in 1858, with the trustees comprising local pastoralists, namely John Bell of Woolbrook, George Russell of Golf Hill, and Reverend Simpson. Initial services were conducted one Sunday a month, in the evenings. The same year, the congregation created a Denominational School. 36 students enrolled at first, and this number rose due to increased settlement in the region.

By 1878, a new government school in the town replaced the Presbyterian school.

In the 1950s, the church was extended, with the addition of a weatherboard section. A pulpit donated by David Keith Pitcairn Miller is housed here, along with additional World War 2 memorial furniture. The windows were replaced with Gothic style alternatives.

In 1955, a timber building was relocated to the church grounds, and was used as a Sunday school.

The church grounds also contain a grove of Monterey cyrpress and golden cypress.

== See also ==
- Shelford Presbyterian Church
- Rokewood Uniting Church
- Wickliffe Uniting Church
