= Meredith railway station =

Former railway station in Victoria, Australia

Coordinates: 37°50′41″S 144°04′09″E

Meredith
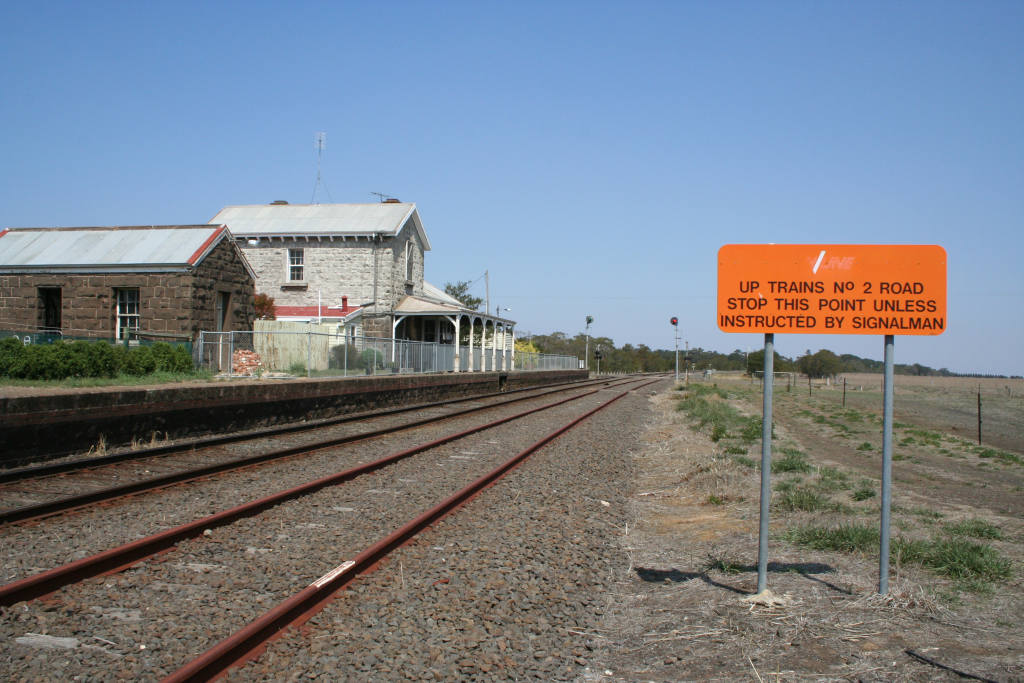
- Meredith platform with adjacent crossing loop

General information
- Owner: VicTrack
- Line: Geelong-Ballarat
- Platforms: 1
- Tracks: 2

Other information
- Status: Closed

Services
Preceding station	Disused railways	Following station
Lethbridge	Geelong-Ballarat line	Elaine
	List of closed railway stations in Victoria	
Location

Meredith is a closed railway station on the Geelong–Ballarat railway line, located in the township of Meredith, Victoria, Australia. There is a crossing loop at the station, while the station building is used as a residence, and is fenced off from the platform.

Grain and freight trains use the railway line. Although no V/Line trains serve the station, a number of V/Line road coach services stop in the township each day.

The crossing loop itself was extended in 1987.
