= Moorabool =

Suburb near Geelong, Victoria, Australia

- Suburb
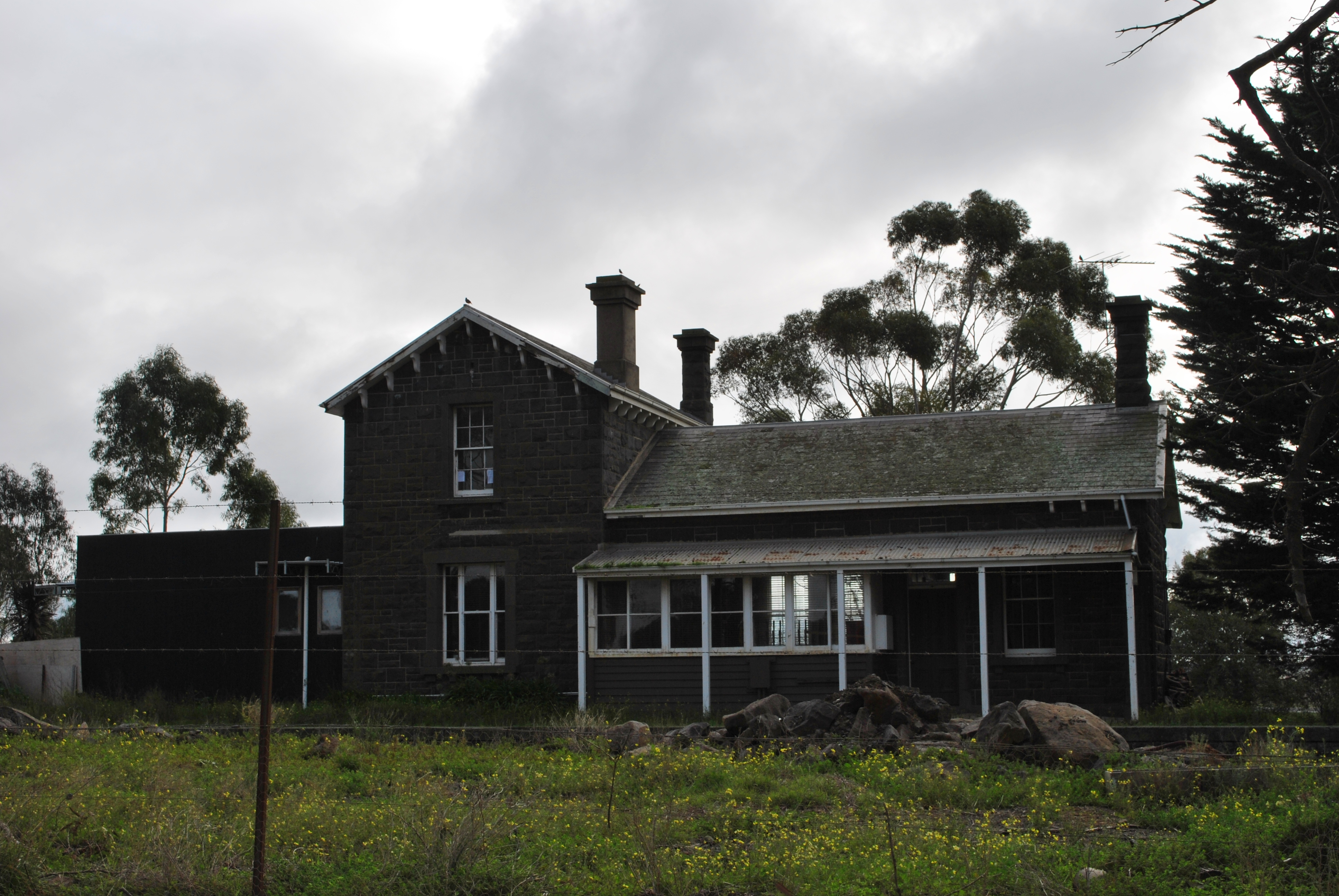
- The former railway station

- Interactive map of Moorabool
- Coordinates: 38°04′S 144°18′E
- Country: Australia
- State: Victoria
- LGA: City of Greater Geelong

Government
  - State electorate: Lara
  - Federal division: Corio

Population
  - Total: 94 (SAL 2021)
- Postcode: 3221/3213
Suburbs around Moorabool
Sutherlands Creek	Anakie	Lovely Banks
Sutherlands Creek	Moorabool	Lovely Banks
Gheringhap	Batesford	Bell Post Hill

Moorabool (/ˈmʊərəˌbʊl/ MOOR-uh-bull) is a locality of the City of Greater Geelong local government area in Victoria, Australia. (It is not in the Shire of Moorabool.)

== History ==
Moorabool Post Office opened on 1 October 1861 and closed in 1960.

In 2021, the Victorian Big Battery began operations at Moorabool.

=== Heritage listed sites ===
Moorabool contains a number of heritage listed sites, including:

- Geelong-Ballarat railway line, Cowies Creek Rail Bridge No. 2
- 275 Ballan Road, Moorabool railway station
- Geelong-Ballarat railway line, Moorabool River Railway Viaduct
