= Batesford =

Batesford Geelong, Victoria
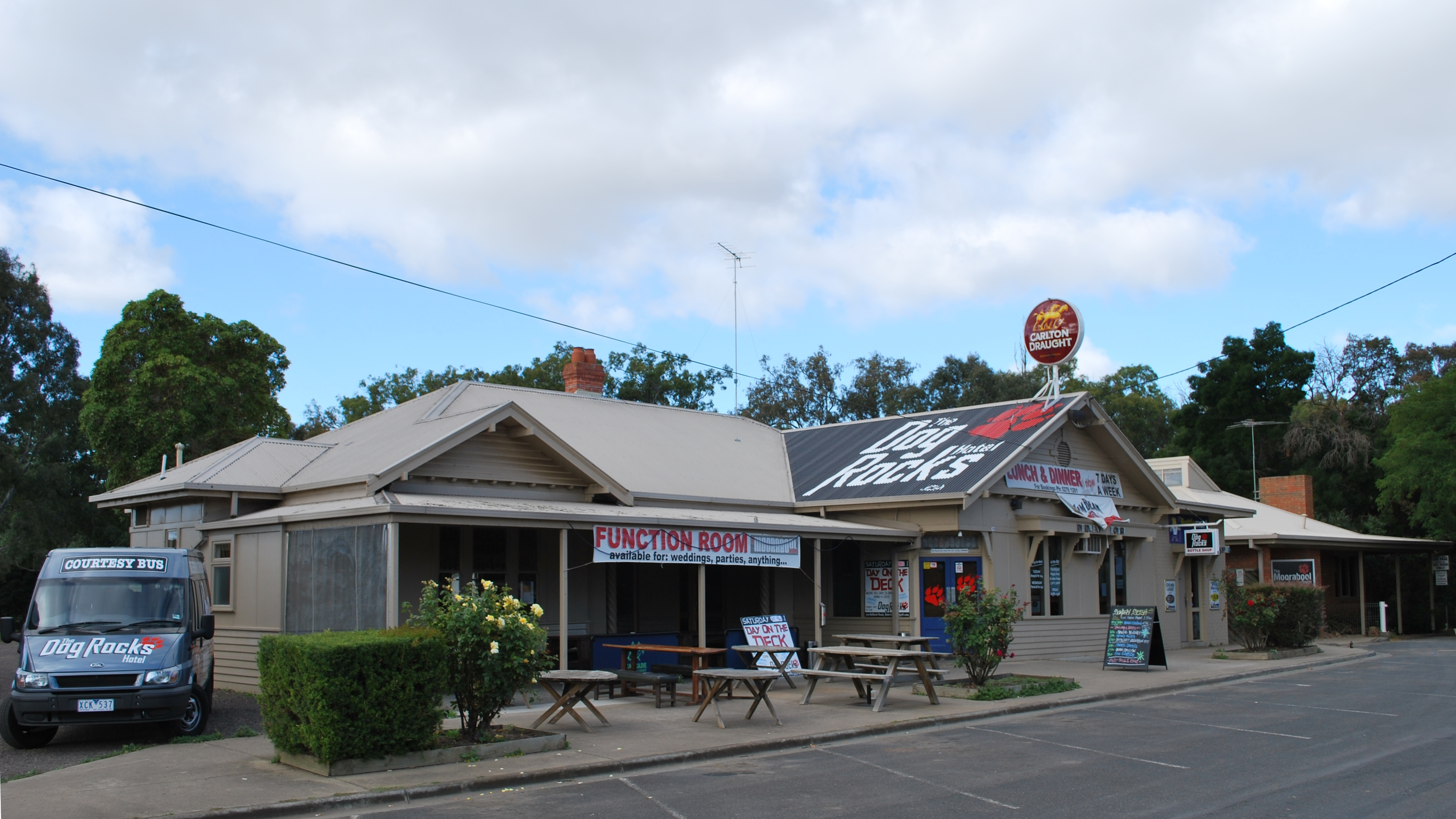
- The Dog Rocks Hotel at Batesford

- Coordinates: 38°06′S 144°17′E
- Population: 1,141 (SAL 2021)
- Postcode(s): 3213
- LGA(s): City of Greater Geelong; Golden Plains Shire
- State electorate(s): Lara; Geelong
- Federal division(s): Corio
Suburbs around Batesford:
Gheringhap	Moorabool	Bell Post Hill
Gheringhap	Batesford	Bell Post Hill
Stonehaven	Fyansford	Hamlyn Heights

Batesford is a town located approximately 10 kilometres west of Geelong and 67 kilometres south-west of the state capital, Melbourne.

It is located on the banks of the Moorabool River and on the Midland Highway. The town is divided between the City of Greater Geelong and Golden Plains Shire.

== History ==
Batesford is named after Alfred and John Bates who settled here in 1837 at a place where the river could be forded. The township was surveyed in 1854 and was originally named Hopeton after George Hope whose land it formed a part. A feature of Batesford is the bluestone bridge dating from 1859 which now forms part of the service road past the Batesford Hotel (formerly the Derwent or Dog Rocks Hotel). Both these structures are on the Register of the National Estate. The Post Office opened on 18 August 1856 and closed in 1949.

Batesford features a large granite outcrop, the 'Dog Rocks', in a reserve located within the town that obtained its name from local wild dogs that once lived around the rocks. Indigenous Australians believe the 'Dog Rocks' to be haunted. Batesford contains the Dogs Rocks Fauna and Flora Sanctuary, which is home to many endemic species. It was established when the current owner George Belcher’s great grandfather purchased the property in 1856. It is situated adjacent to the Dog Rocks outcrop on the top of a hill in west Batesford. This open eucalyptus woodland nurtures a rich variety of flora and fauna. Rare local native vegetation can be found. The Sanctuary is recognised for its concentration of bird life and provides a protected haven and habitat for them. It also contains a variety of mammals and reptiles which are all part of the complex ecology of the area.

== Batesford today ==
Batesford in 2019 still has a Hotel and the other campus of Rollins Primary School. The Bell Park Soccer Club play their home games at the Bell Park Sport & Recreation Club even though the grounds are actually in Batesford. Batesford also has a roadhouse.

== Heritage listed sites ==
Batesford contains a number of heritage listed sites, including:

- 56 Buchter Road, Laurence Park Homestead
- Midland Highway, Moorabool River Bridge
- Geelong-Ballarat railway line, Moorabool River Railway Viaduct
- 750 Midland Highway, Travellers Rest Inn 1849

== Gallery ==
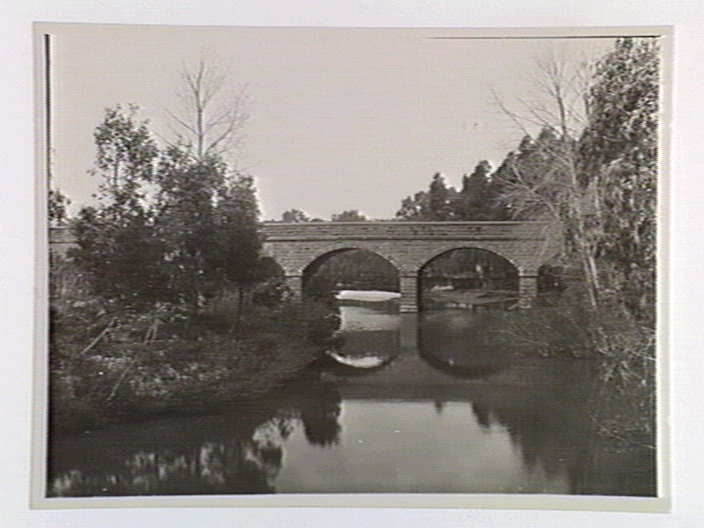
The old Batesford Bridge, built using bluestone in 1859

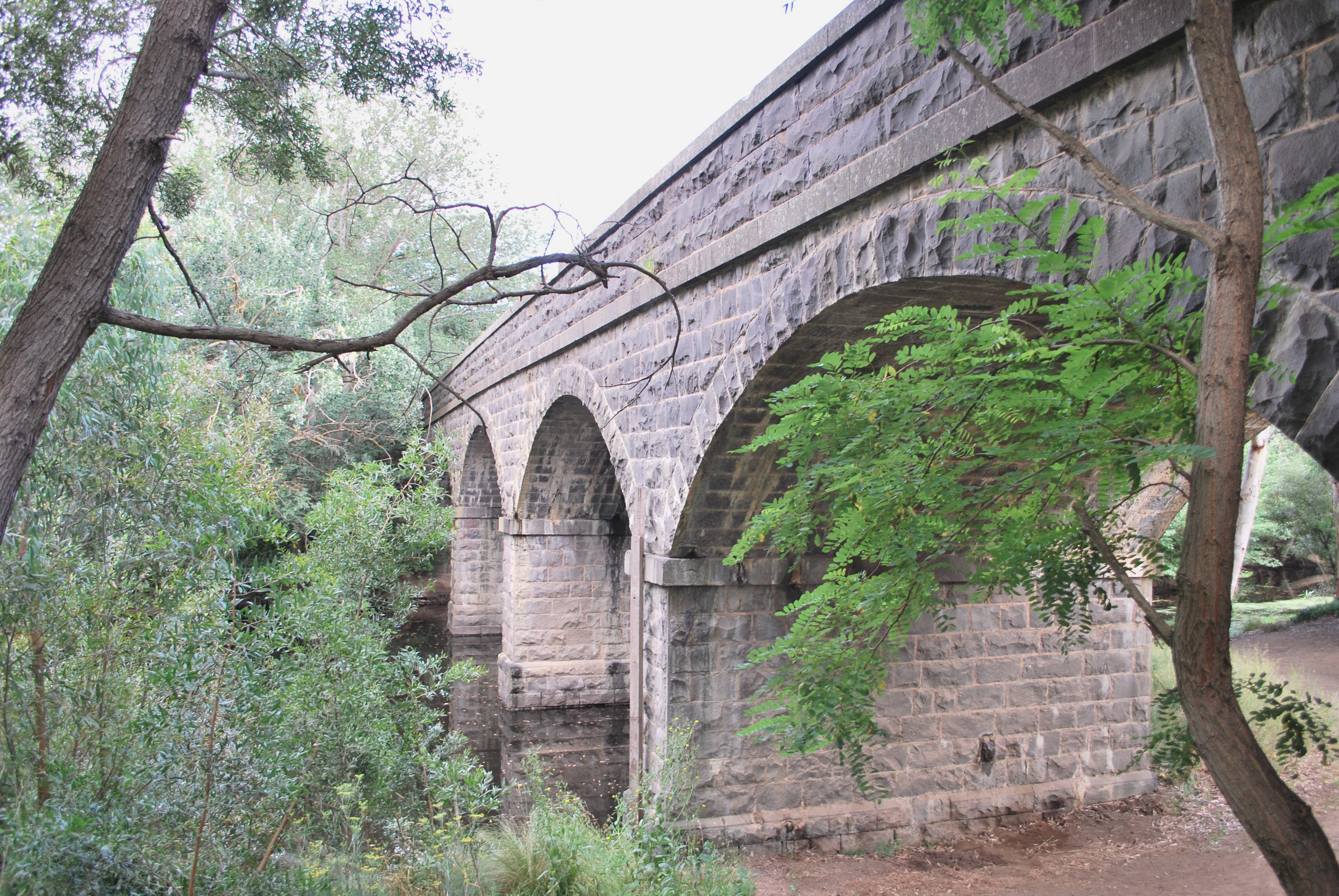
The bridge in 2010
