= Teesdale, Victoria =

Teesdale
- Town
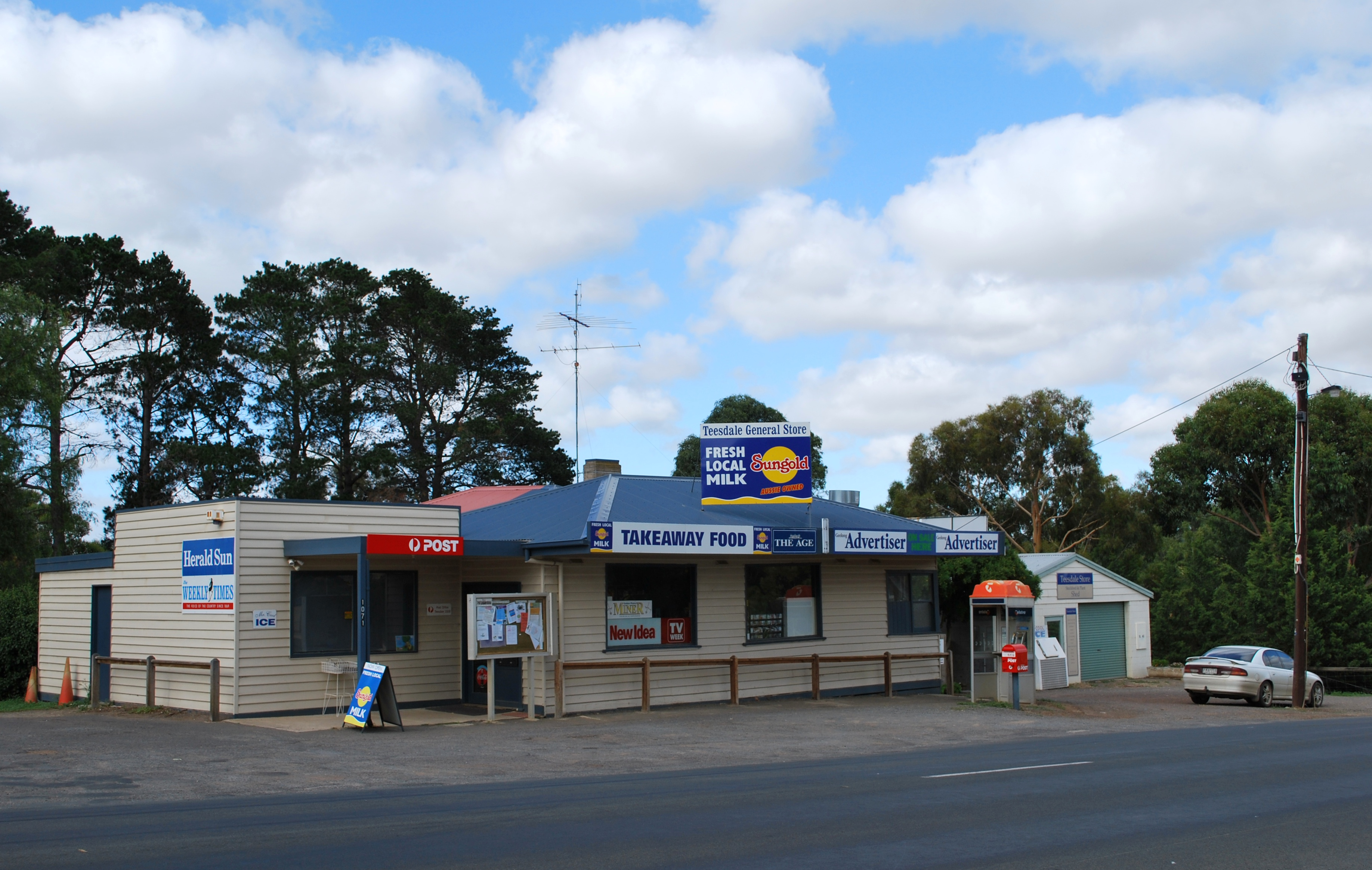
- General store and post office

- Coordinates: 38°02′0″S 144°03′0″E
- Country: Australia
- State: Victoria
- LGA: Golden Plains Shire
- Location: 11 km (6.8 mi) W of Bannockburn; 34 km (21 mi) W of Geelong; 12 km (7.5 mi) N of Inverleigh

Government
  - State electorate: Polwarth
  - Federal division: Ballarat

Population
  - Total: 2,244 (UCL 2021)
- Postcode: 3328
Localities around Teesdale
Shelford	Lethbridge	Lethbridge
Shelford	Teesdale	Bannockburn
Inverleigh	Inverleigh	Murgheboluc

Teesdale is a town in the Golden Plains Shire, 34km west of the regional city of Geelong, between Bannockburn and Shelford.

The town has become a place for both high net worth residents seeking a country lifestyle, and young homebuyers who are prepared to commute to Melbourne or Geelong for work. In 2006 the town had 1033 residents but that has grown to 1479 in 2011 and 1721 residents in 2016 census .

A feature of the town is a large park to the north of the main road known to the locals as 'Turtle Bend', featuring playgrounds, bike tracks, walking trails, BBQ areas, and a community building with a steel roof in the shape of a turtle.

The Teesdale Presbyterian Church was built in 1858, making it one of the oldest buildings in the town.

Teesdale General Store and Post Office is one of the oldest in the area, having opened on 8 March 1864.

In addition to the general store and post office, Teesdale is a thriving small town community which includes a primary school, doctors clinic, pharmacy, cafe, childcare centre, community hall and numerous sporting and community organisations.
