= Church of the Epiphany, Meredith =

Anglican church in Meredith, Victoria, Australia

Anglican Church of the Epiphany
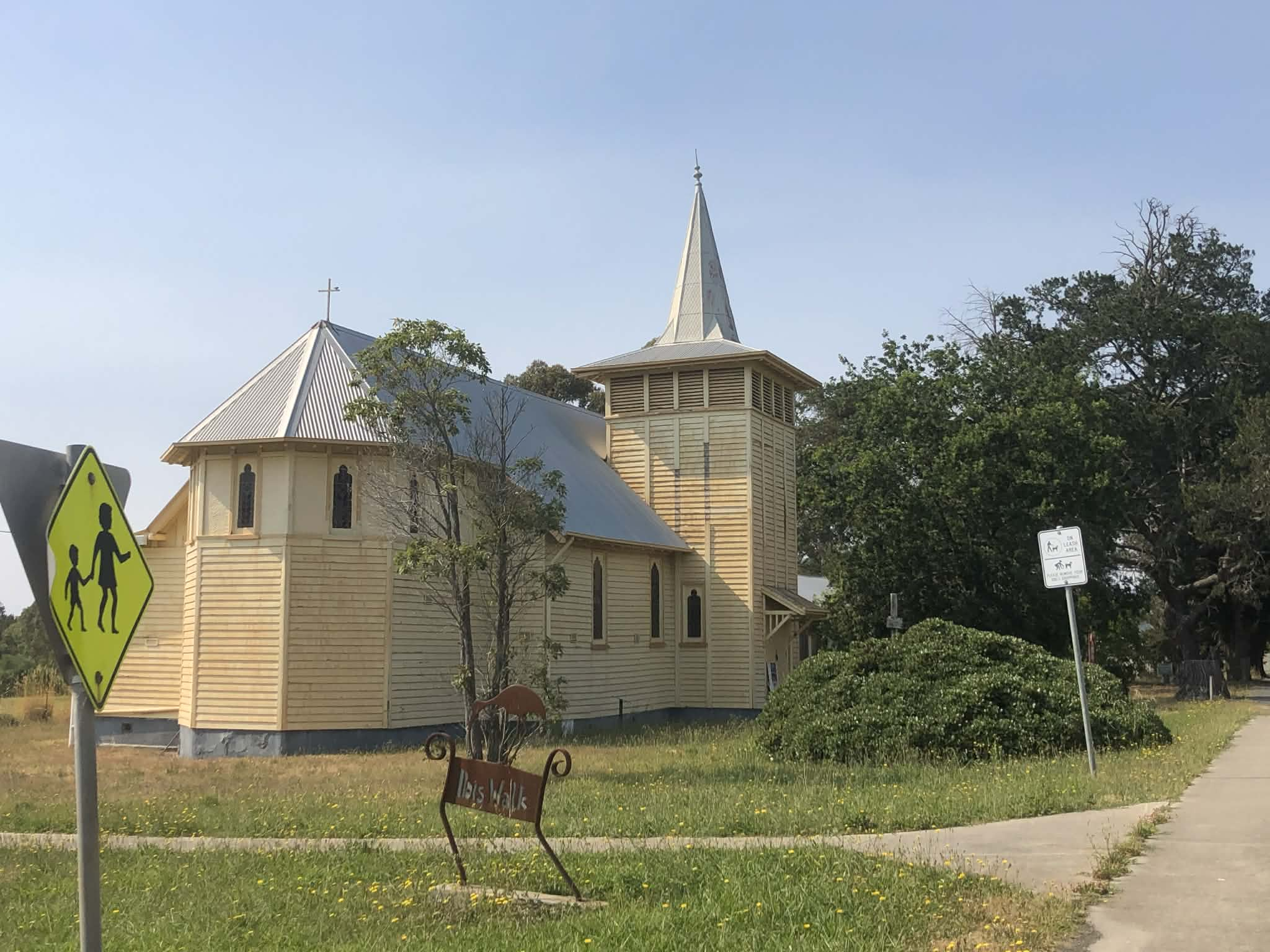
- Anglican Church of the Epiphany, January 2026
- Anglican Church of the Epiphany
- 37°50′37″S 144°04′39″E
- Location: Corner of Wallace Street (Midland Highway) and Russell Street, Meredith, Victoria
- Country: Australia
- Denomination: Anglican Church of Australia
- Website: goldenplainsanglican.org

History
- Former name: Christ Church
- Status: Active

Architecture
- Architect: Alexander North
- Style: Gothic Survival
- Years built: 1913–1914 (present church)
- Completed: 1860 (original church), 1914 (present church), later additions

Administration
- Province: Victoria
- Diocese: Melbourne

Clergy
- Vicar: Rev. Dr. Timothy Smith

Victorian Heritage Register
- Official name: Anglican Church of the Epiphany
- Type: Heritage Place
- Designated: 27 July 1989
- Reference no.: 67996
- Heritage Overlay number: B5787

The Anglican Church of the Epiphany is a historic Anglican church located in Meredith, Victoria, Australia. The present church, replacing an older church on the site, was completed in 1914, and is situated in the Parish of Inverleigh-Bannockburn-Meredith, part of the Anglican Diocese of Melbourne. The church, which is heritage-listed, is noted for its unique wooden interior.

== See also ==
- St John's Anglican Church, Bannockburn
