= St Mary's Church, Lethbridge =

Closed Roman Catholic church in Victoria, Australia

St Mary's Catholic Church
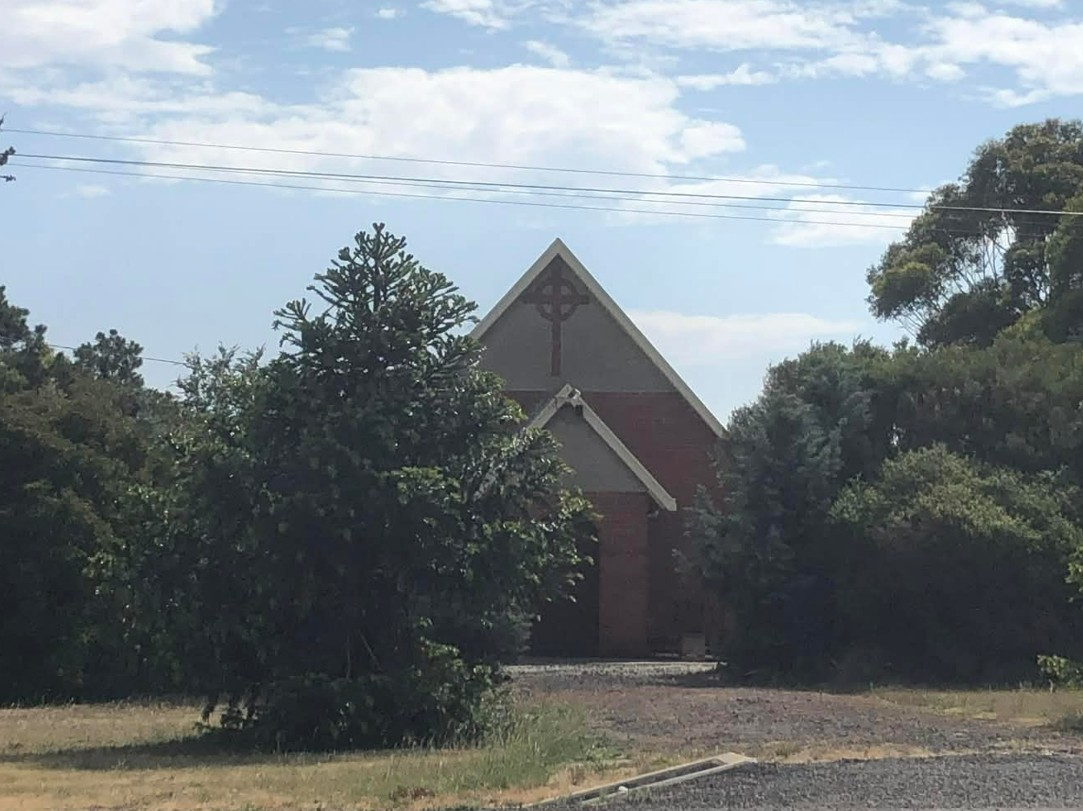
- St Mary's Catholic Church
- 37°58′07″S 144°08′26″E
- Address: 2779 Midland Highway, Lethbridge, Victoria
- Country: Australia
- Denomination: Roman Catholic

History
- Status: Church
- Dedication: Mary, mother of Jesus

Architecture
- Functional status: Closed (private residence)
- Architect: Bartholomew Moriarty
- Architectural type: Church
- Style: Georgian Revival
- Years built: 1859-1860 (original), 1913 (present building)
- Closed: 2012

Specifications
- Materials: Brick

Administration
- Archdiocese: Melbourne
- Parish: Meredith

St Mary's Church is a heritage-listed Roman Catholic church building located in the town of Lethbridge, Victoria, Australia. The church, built in 1913 replacing an earlier 1860 structure, was once part of the Catholic Parish of Meredith until its closure in 2012, where it has since been turned into a private residence. The church is one of the few surviving religious buildings in the town.

== History ==
Prior to the construction of the present church building, an earlier timber church was constructed in 1859. By 1860, the church was open for services.

The original structure, made of timber, was moved to another site, and replaced with the present structure in 1913. The church was built in the Georgian Revival style to the designs of Messrs. Lusk and Moriarty. The building incorporates pressed red brick for the walls, rough-cast stucco for the gables, and a corrugated iron roof. The church grounds also contains several Monterey pines.

The Parish of Meredith celebrated its centenary in 1975.

The church closed in 2012, and was sold the same year on 3 March for $220,000.
