= Rokewood Uniting Church =

Former church in Australia

- Rokewood Presbyterian Church
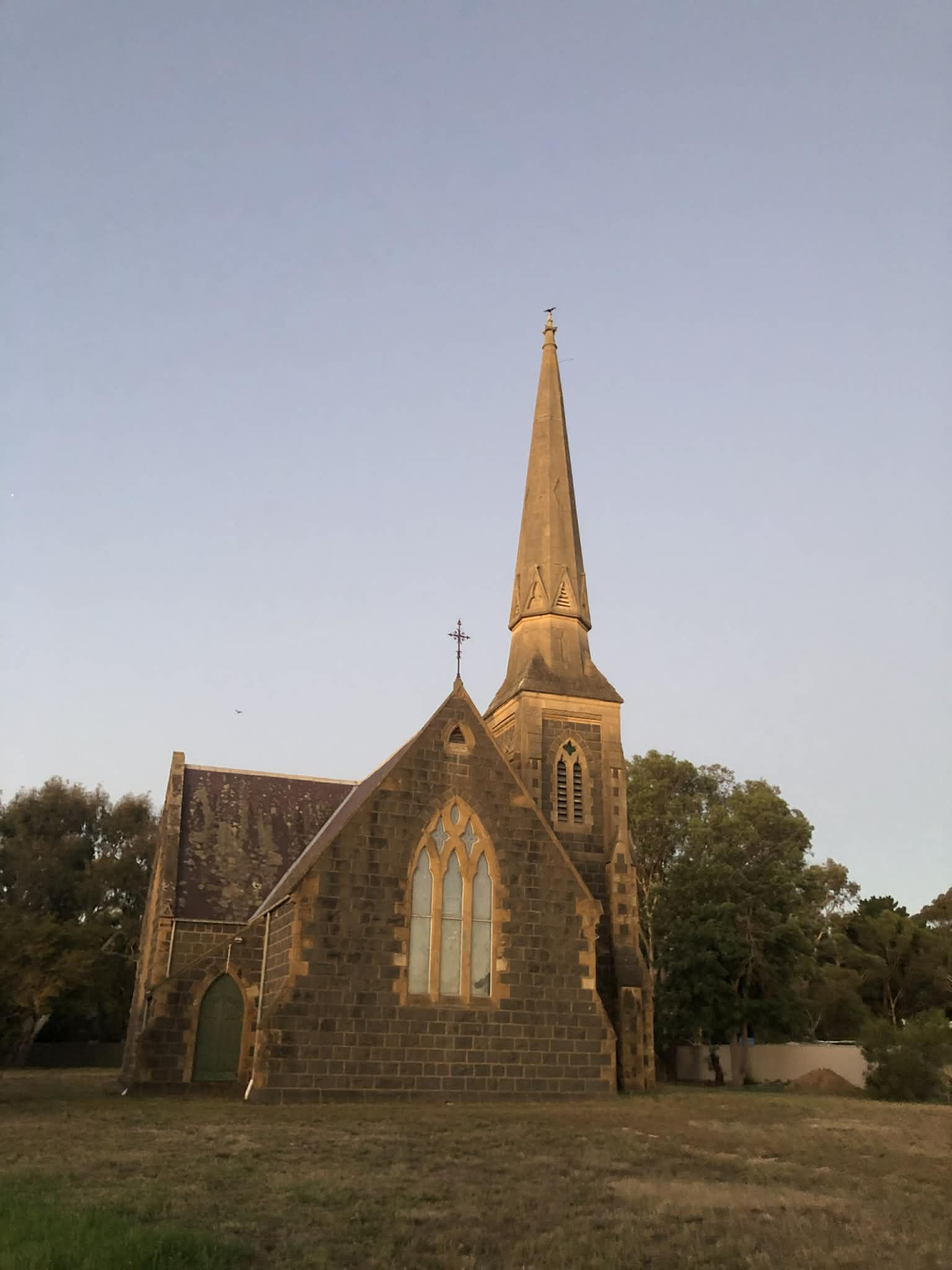
- Rokewood Uniting Church
- Rokewood Uniting Church
- 37.900530°S 143.721208°E
- Address: 60 Ferrars Street, Rokewood, Victoria
- Country: Australia
- Denomination: Uniting (since 1977)

History
- Status: Closed (private residence)

Architecture
- Architect(s): Davidson and Henderson
- Architectural type: Church
- Style: Victorian Gothic
- Years built: 1865-1866, 1905 (spire)
- Closed: 2020

Victorian Heritage Register
- Official name: Rokewood Presbyterian Church
- Type: Heritage Place
- Reference no.: 185013
- Heritage Overlay number: HO101, HO61

Rokewood Uniting Church (formerly Rokewood Presbyterian Church) is a heritage-listed church building in Rokewood, Victoria, Australia. It was built in 1866 for a Presbyterian church, which became Uniting Church in 1977, and dissolved in 2020. It has since been converted to a private residence. The church is notable for its architecture, particularly its broach spire.

== History ==
Services began in 1847 under the Rev. Mr Gow, meeting in private residences before the construction of the church building. Mr Gow was provided with accommodation on his travels, particularly by Messrs. E. and F. Aitcheson of the nearby Kuruc-A-Ruc Homestead, and Messrs Elder. Mr. Gow, educated as a minister in Scotland, originally settled on a property now known as Mount Gow, but after being approached by Messrs. Aitcheson upon hearing of his preaching abilities, was asked if he would leave his property to become the district's preacher. After moving around the district and establishing the congregation, he later moved to Pitfield, as services were now conducted on a monthly basis by the visiting Rev. Archibald Simpson from Shelford at McLarty's (Stanbrook's) Hotel from 1856.

In 1858 a schoolhouse was constructed, headed by Mr. Savage. This schoolhouse, reputedly funded by the Presbyterians of the district, doubled as a school and church. Reverend John Cooper was brought over from Geelong to become the town's pastor in 1859. After a year of his tenure, proposals were made for the construction of a manse, and in 1860 the government granted some land for a manse and an acre for a potential church. The site where the church now stands was purchased for £8 on 11 March 1865, and on 23 August 1866 the church was completed, built to designs by Alexander Davidson, with the opening sermon conducted by Rev. J. Oswald Dykes.

A vestry was added in 1874.

On 9 February 1887, a fence was constructed around the church, at a cost of £42. A new bell was presented to the church the following year on 15 January.

The tower, and its broach spire, were added in 1905, containing a memorial stone to Mrs W. G. Elder. The tower employs recessed bands surmounted by gables.

In 1951, the Smythesdale Church of England was relocated to the rear of the church, where it was converted to a hall and school under the name "Alan Bell Memorial Hall", in memory of the brother of Gladys Bell, who funded the relocation of the church. This has since been demolished.

At the formation of the Uniting Church of Australia in 1977, the Rokewood congregation became part of the new body.

In 2020, reputedly due to a dwindling congregation, it was decided to put the church up for sale, and for the money made from the sale to be put towards broader social and community needs. The church was sold on April 23, 2021, for the price of $555,500.

== See also ==
- Shelford Presbyterian Church
- Teesdale Presbyterian Church
- Wickliffe Uniting Church
