= Wickliffe Uniting Church =

Former church in Australia

- Wickliffe Presbyterian Church
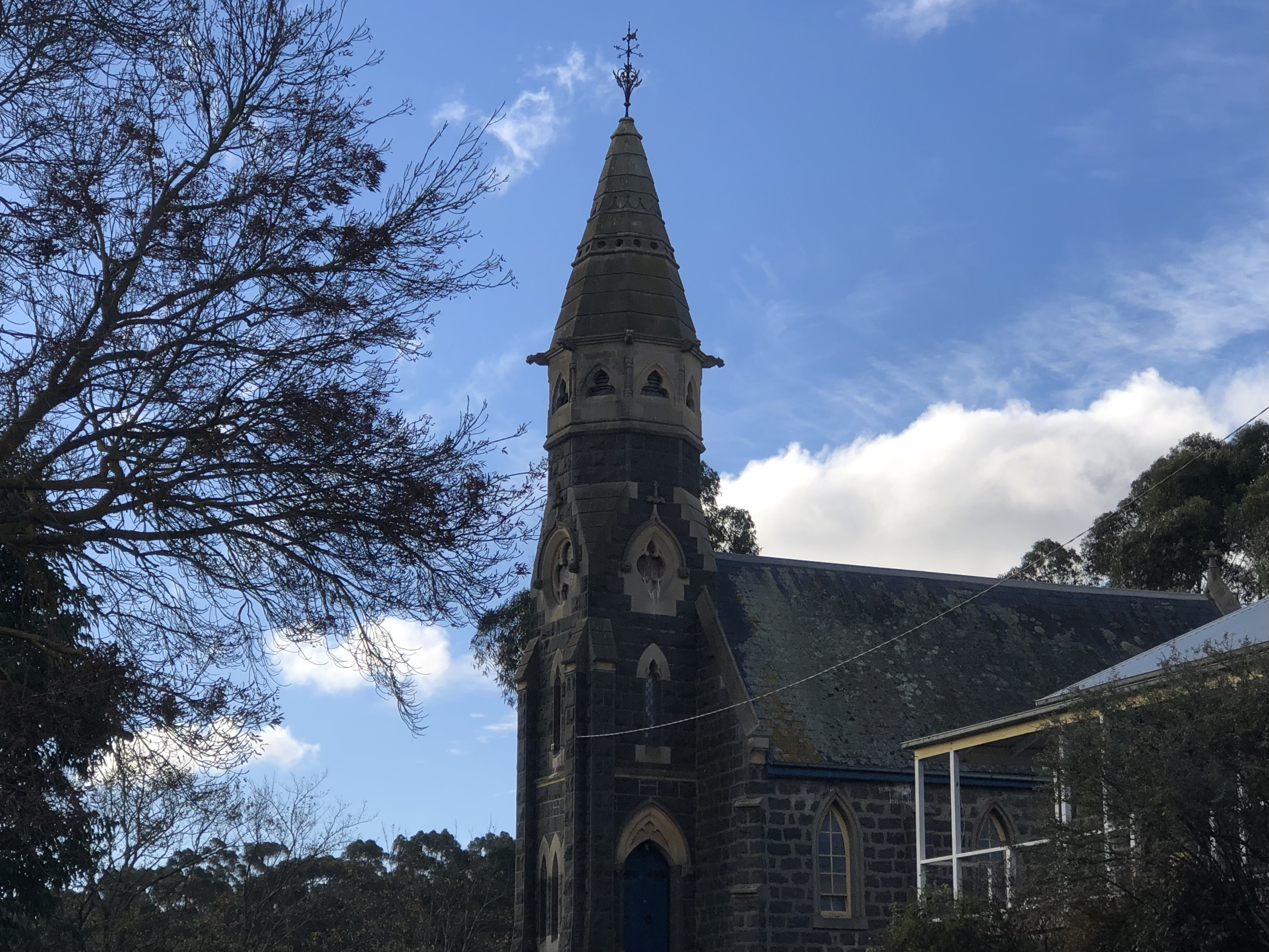
- Wickliffe Uniting Church, 2026
- Wickliffe Uniting Church
- 37.690521°S 142.724244°E
- Address: 26 Walker St, Wickliffe, Victoria
- Country: Australia
- Denomination: Uniting (since 1977)

History
- Status: Closed (private residence)

Architecture
- Architect(s): J. Ingles, Alexander Davidson
- Architectural type: Church
- Style: Victorian Gothic
- Years built: 1861, 1878 (spire)
- Closed: 2018

Wickliffe Uniting Church is a former Presbyterian-turned-Uniting church at Wickliffe, Victoria Australia. Constructed in 1861 to serve the district's predominantly Scottish pastoral community, the bluestone church is one of the earliest surviving ecclesiastical buildings in the district. Although modest in scale when first completed, it was substantially enhanced in 1878 with the addition of an imposing stone tower and spire designed by architect Alexander Davidson, giving the building its distinctive Gothic appearance. Following church union in 1977 it became part of the Uniting Church in Australia before eventually closing and being sold in 2018. The building is recognised for both its architectural significance and its long association with the Scottish settlement of the Western District.

== History ==
The establishment of the Presbyterian church at Wickliffe reflected the large number of Scottish pastoralists and settlers who occupied the surrounding district during the nineteenth century. Religious services were being conducted as early as 1849 by the Rev. John McLachlan, who resided on a nearby pastoral station and travelled throughout the district ministering to local families.

The congregation was formally organised in 1860 with the appointment of its first resident minister, Rev. Edward Blair. The congregation guaranteed Blair an annual stipend of £200, while regular service were initially conducted in the Hopkins Hotel until a permanent church could be erected. Through local fundraising, subscriptions and a government grant, sufficient funds were raised to construct both a church and a manse at a total cost of approximately £1,500, of which around £1,000 was contributed by local residents. Several subscribers donated as much as one hundred guineas towards the project.

Construction of the church and manse commenced in 1861. The buildings were erected by Messrs Trebane and Neville of Geelong to plans prepared by J. Ingles. Built of bluestone with Waurn Ponds stone dressings, the Gothic-style church was designed to accommodate approximately 130 worshippers.

Rev. Blair's ministry was relatively brief, ending with his resignation owing to ill health. His successor, Rev. Robert Sutherland, was appointed but later withdrawn after the congregation proved unable to meet the financial commitment of his stipend. In 1863, the charge was filled by Rev. D. Kay, whose ministry lasted until 1874 despite frequent periods of ill health. During his time at Wickliffe the neighbouring district of Lake Bolac became part of the Wickliffe and Glenthompson pastoral charge. Kay also undertook improvements to the church grounds by planting trees, shrubs and flowers along the roadside to protect the property from wandering stock. After local authorities ordered the roadway reopened, the minister fenced the church grounds instead, abandoning the plantings to grazing cattle and goats.

Following Kay's resignation, the congregation experienced two years without a settled minister. Between 1874 and 1876 a succession of home missionaries conducted regular services, although none accepted a permanent call. During this period evening services were introduced for the first time. Concern over the prolonged vacancy became sufficiently great that some residents proposed constructing an Anglican church in the hope of securing a resident Church of England clergyman. The uncertainty ended in 1876 with the induction of Rev. J. S. Muir, restoring a permanent Presbyterian ministry to the district.

Church life expanded steadily during the nineteenth century. A Sunday School was operating by the 1870s, with picnics and teas organised by members of the congregation, while a Band of Hope was established to encourage temperance among local children and young people. Financial support for the church initially relied largely on annual subscriptions collected from parishioners, although this system was gradually supplemented by special collections and, later, regular offerings during worship services. Monthly evening collections introduced in 1909 contributed specifically towards the maintenance of church property, while weekly collections at every service were not adopted until 1947. In later years church crops were also grown to assist with finances.

One of the most significant episodes in the church's history concerned the construction of its bell tower. During the 1870s considerable dissatisfaction arose because the church bell had been placed on a temporary low timber support rather than in a permanent tower. Contemporary criticism questioned the value of purchasing a bell without providing an appropriate structure to house it. The matter was finally resolved in 1878 when prominent pastoralist John Dixon Wyselaskie of Narrapumelap, an early supporter of Presbyterian ministry in the district and one of the congregation's founders, funded the construction of a 21-metre stone tower and steeple together with restoration of the church exterior at a cost of approximately £600. The tower, designed by architect Alexander Davidson, transformed the appearance of the building and introduced an accomplished interpretation of French Decorated Gothic architecture, incorporating details such as gargoyles and a decorative weather vane inspired by the writings of the French architect and architectural historian Eugène Viollet-le-Duc.

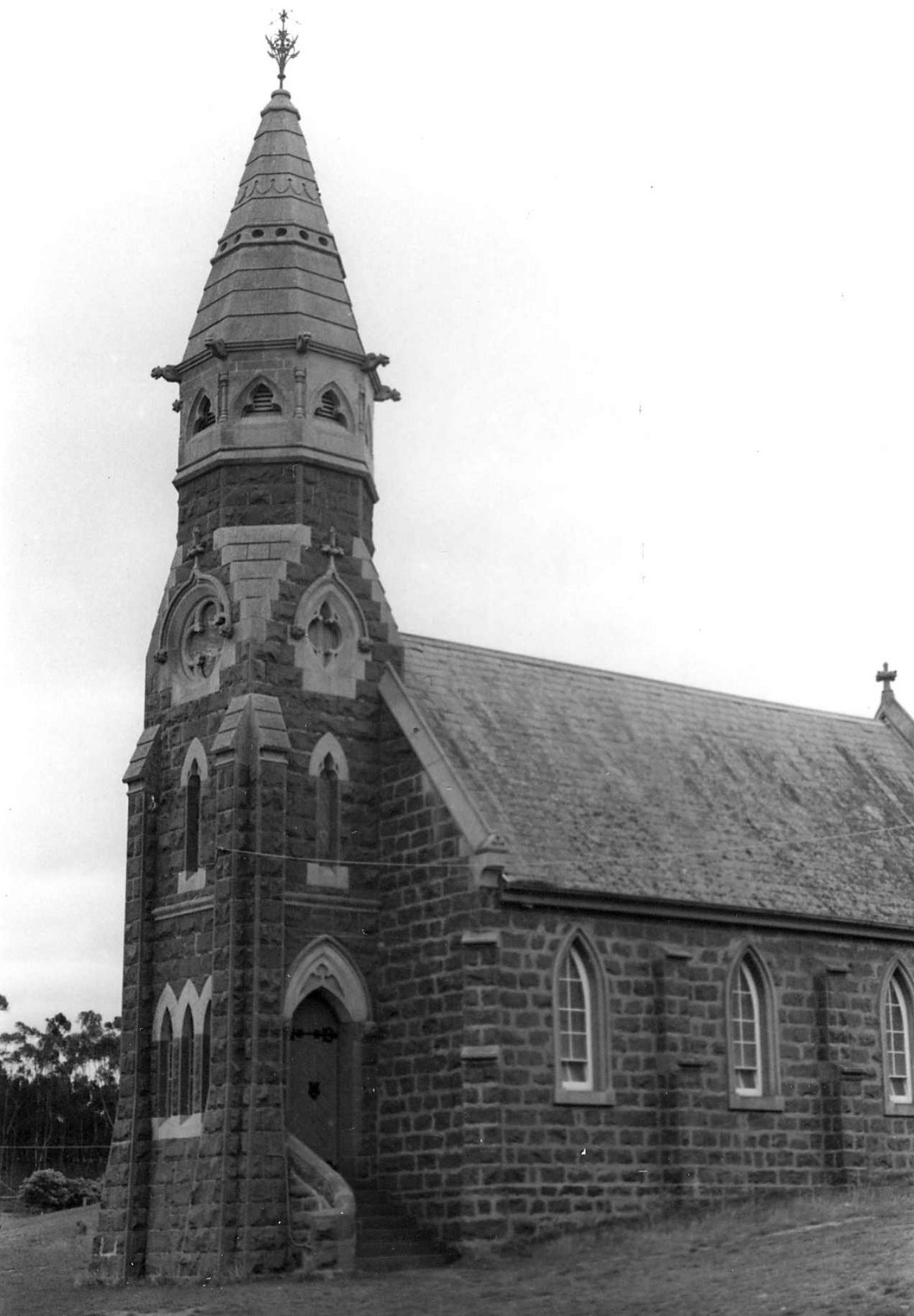
The church, 1967

Following Wyselaskie's death, the church benefited further from his generosity through a substantial bequest. Trustees William Moffatt, Albert Austin and Thomas Millear, of the nearby properties Berrambool, Greenvale and Chatsworth House received the first instalment of approximately £1,400 in 1884, followed by an additional £288 in 1886. These funds were invested in government securities for the long-term support of the congregation. In recognition of his contribution, a memorial and thanksgiving service was held in the church on 4 May 1933.

On Sunday 7 June 1914, an evening memorial service was conducted by the Rev. A. McLeod, for Murray Ford, who died, aged 19, on Sunday 31 May 1914 at a private hospital in Willaura, after a prolonged illness battle stemming from a brain tumour. The pulpit and the church were subsequently draped in black.

In 1922, a meeting was held in the church, with various representatives from the churches in the charge in attendance, where it was decided to call upon the Rev. G. Raff to fill the role as minister.

The church also served other Christian denominations within the district. In 1880 permission was granted for Anglican serves to be conducted in the building, and by 1923 the Church of England paid a nominal annual rent of one shilling in order to formalise the arrangement.

Throughout the late nineteenth and early twentieth centuries numerous improvements were made to the church's facilities. In 1898 pews were formally allocated to subscribers, with individual seats available for five shillings and entire pews for twenty shillings. The church bell-ringer initially received an annual payment before the duty eventually became voluntary, while responsibility for cleaning the church similarly passed from paid caretakers to members of the congregation. From 1922 the ladies of the church undertook responsibility for decorating the building. A telephone was installed in the manse in 1914, and in 1923 the congregation purchased a motor car for the minister at a cost of £205.

The original manse, erected in 1861, was eventually considered unsuitable as a residence. In 1954 a new manse was constructed at Lake Bolac, while the original building was retained for church meetings and Sunday School activities. A separate Sunday School hall, purchased and relocated to the church grounds in 1928 in memory of Elizabeth Tillyer, further expanded the congregation's facilities. Other gifts included individual communion cups donated by Claude Pagels in 1936. During the late twentieth century the church also benefited from substantial bequests from the estates of Frances E. Howlett and Margaret K. S. Howlett, intended to support the maintenance and improvement of the church property.

Following the formation of the Uniting Church in Australia in 1977, the congregation became the Wickliffe Uniting Church within the Presbytery of Western Victoria. Declining rural populations eventually led to the congregation's closure, and the church property was sold in 2018.

== See also ==
- Rokewood Uniting Church
- Shelford Presbyterian Church
