= She Oaks =

- Town
- Coordinates: 37°55′0″S 144°08′0″E
- Country: Australia
- State: Victoria
- LGA: Golden Plains Shire
- Location: 97 km (60 mi) W of Melbourne; 38 km (24 mi) N of Geelong

Government
  - State electorate: Eureka
  - Federal division: Ballarat

Population
  - Total: 126 (SAL 2021)
- Postcode: 3331
Localities around She Oaks
Meredith	Meredith	Steiglitz
Meredith	She Oaks	Steiglitz
Lethbridge	Lethbridge	Maude

She Oaks is a locality in Victoria, Australia. The locality is in the Golden Plains Shire, near the regional city of Geelong and 97 kilometres (60 mi) west of the state capital, Melbourne.

The official name is two words, but on VicRoads signs it appears as "Sheoaks".

She Oaks Post Office opened on 23 March 1916 and closed in 1953.

She Oaks had a school and Presbyterian church. The church was moved to Lethbridge after the Uniting Church was formed. In the next year, the school was destroyed by a bush fire.
