= Inverleigh =

- Town
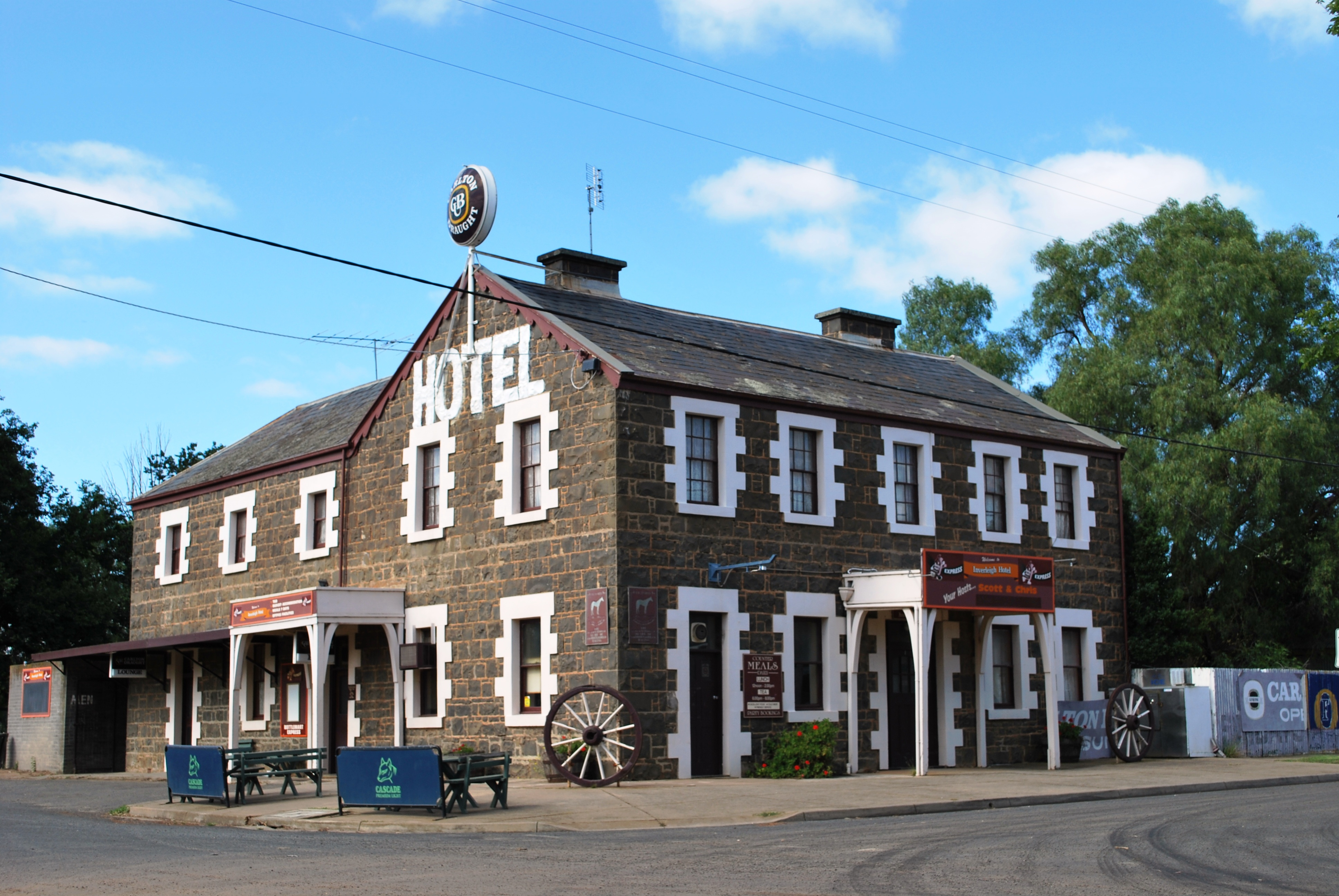
- Inverleigh Hotel

- Coordinates: 38°06′0″S 144°03′0″E
- Country: Australia
- State: Victoria
- LGAs: Golden Plains Shire; Surf Coast Shire
- Location: 87 km (54 mi) SW of Melbourne; 28 km (17 mi) W of Geelong

Government
  - State electorate: Polwarth
  - Federal division: Wannon

Population
  - Total: 1,746 (2021 census)
- Postcode: 3321
Localities around Inverleigh
Shelford	Teesdale	Bannockburn
Hesse	Inverleigh	Murgheboluc; Gnarwarre
Ombersley	Winchelsea	Buckley

Inverleigh is a town in Victoria, Australia located 28 kilometres (17 mi) west from the City of Geelong and 87 kilometres (54 mi) from the state capital, Melbourne. The town is divided between Golden Plains Shire and Surf Coast Shire. In the 2021 census, the central area of Inverleigh had a population of 1,746. Inverleigh is known to be a popular stopover destination on the way to Lorne and Geelong.

Since the mid-1970s Inverleigh has become a dormitory suburb of Geelong. Development of larger blocks to the north of town has led to a doubling of residents in the last 25 years. Some residents have decided that it is feasible to commute to Melbourne. The opening of the Geelong Ring Road improved access to Melbourne which is now a 70-minute drive away.

== History ==
Inverleigh is situated on the country of the traditional custodians, the Wadurrung people (of the Kulin nation). Very little has been recorded of the original inhabitants of the area. The few records available are reports of conflict. In the summer of 1837-38 there was an incident at the Clyde Company (near Lullote) with two Aboriginal persons being killed and another injured and in 1839 George Russell reported natives sheep duffing.

It has been speculated that the first European to arrive in Inverleigh was William Buckley, but the first European known to have visited Inverleigh was the surveyor J.H. Wedge who arrived in 1835, probably naming the Leigh River after his Tasmanian farm 'Leighlands'.

Very soon thereafter the Weatherboard Station land was taken up either by George Russell or by station manager David Fisher on behalf of The Derwent Company. It was claimed that the weatherboard homestead built by the station manager was Victoria's first weatherboard homestead. The name of the station is now commemorated by Weatherboard Road.

Inverleigh Primary School began as a Presbyterian church school in 1865 and was taken over by the Victorian government in 1873. A residence was built at the school in 1912, while the school was extended in 1956. The school had 170 students in 2015.

A second school, Murkeduke State School, opened south-west of the township on 10 September 1917 and closed on 2 August 1932.

The Post Office opened on 11 October 1856.

The Prefabricated Iron Cottage at 24 Weatherboard Road, Inverleigh, is listed on the Victorian Heritage Register for its historical and architectural significance.

== The town today ==
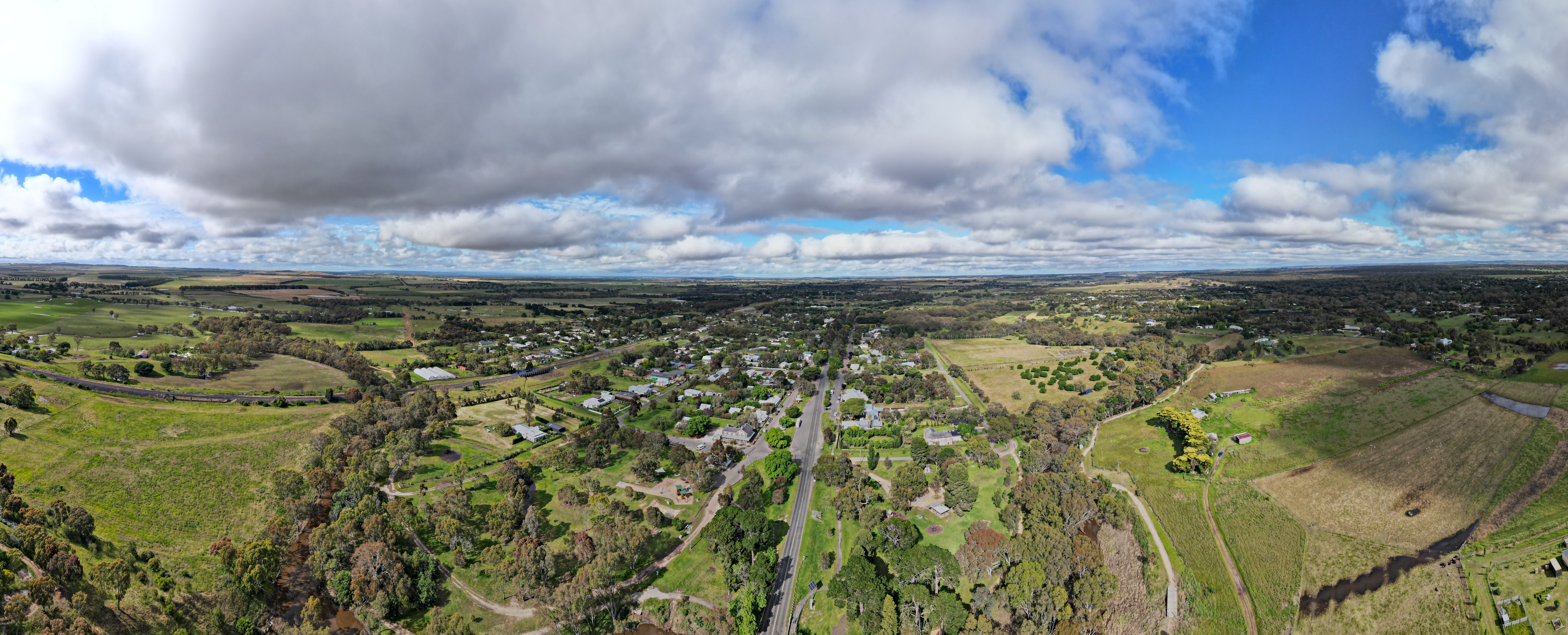
Inverleigh aerial panorama. December 2022

The town has an Australian Rules football team, the Inverleigh Football Club, competing in the Geelong & District Football League.

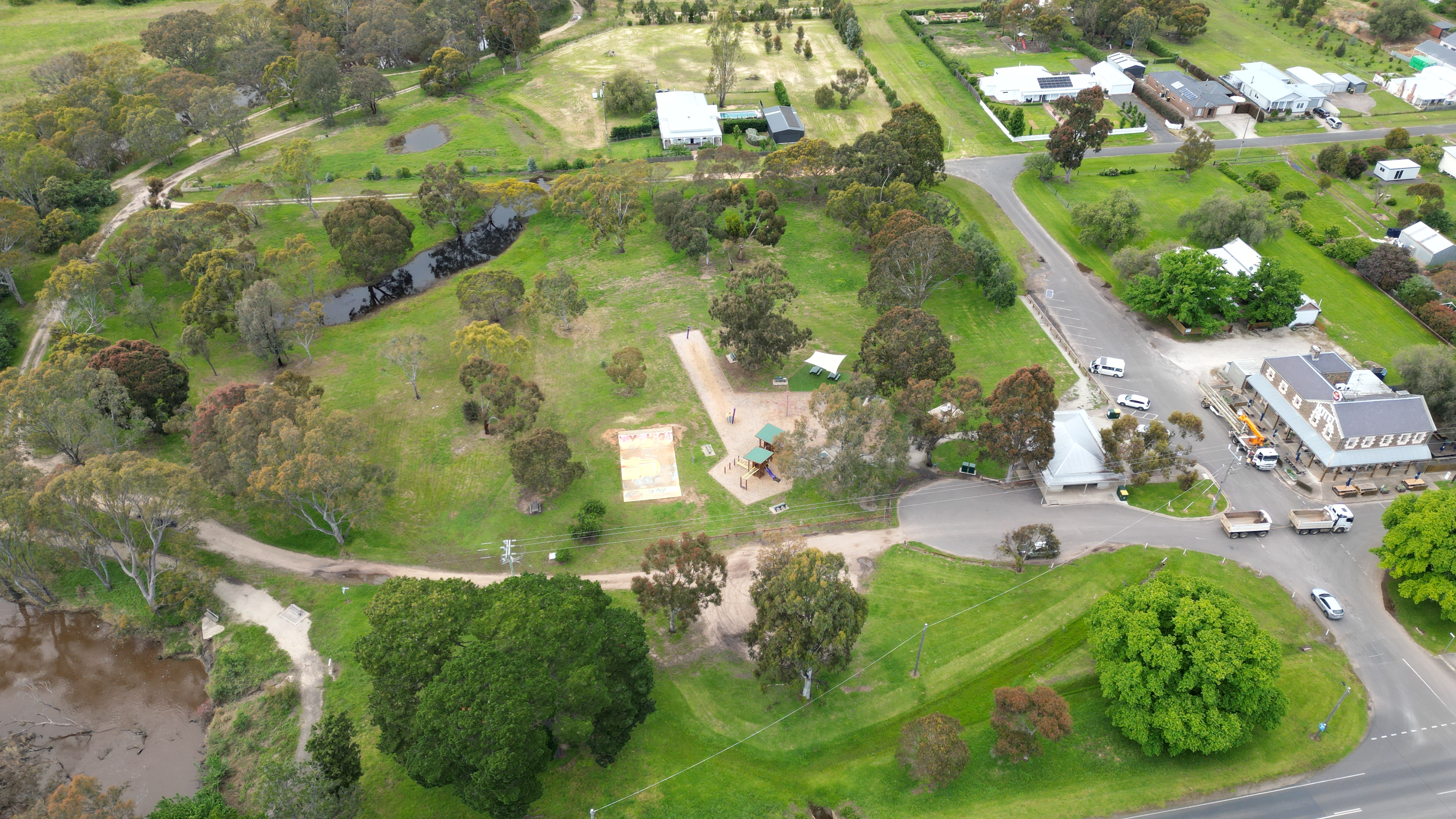
Yerram Yaluk Bun and Inverleigh Hotel from above

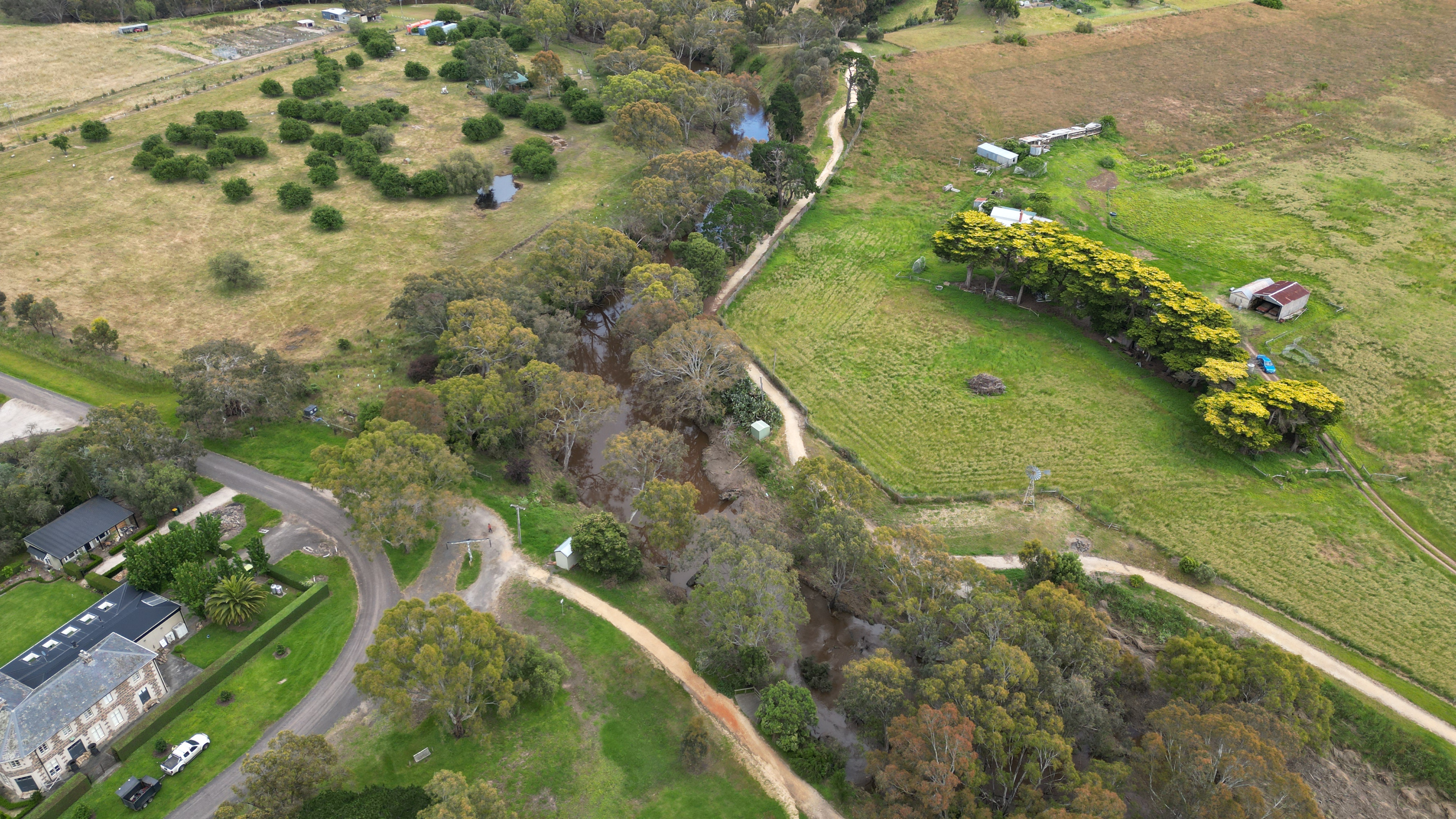
Lawsons Park and Barwon River, Inverleigh from above

The town also has a lawn bowling club with one synthetic green.

Golfers play at the course of the Inverleigh Golf Club on Common Road.

The railway station is closed to passengers, being a siding on the Western standard gauge line between Melbourne and Adelaide. Inverleigh is 104 kilometres (65 mi) from Melbourne by rail.
