= Meredith, Victoria =

Meredith
- Town
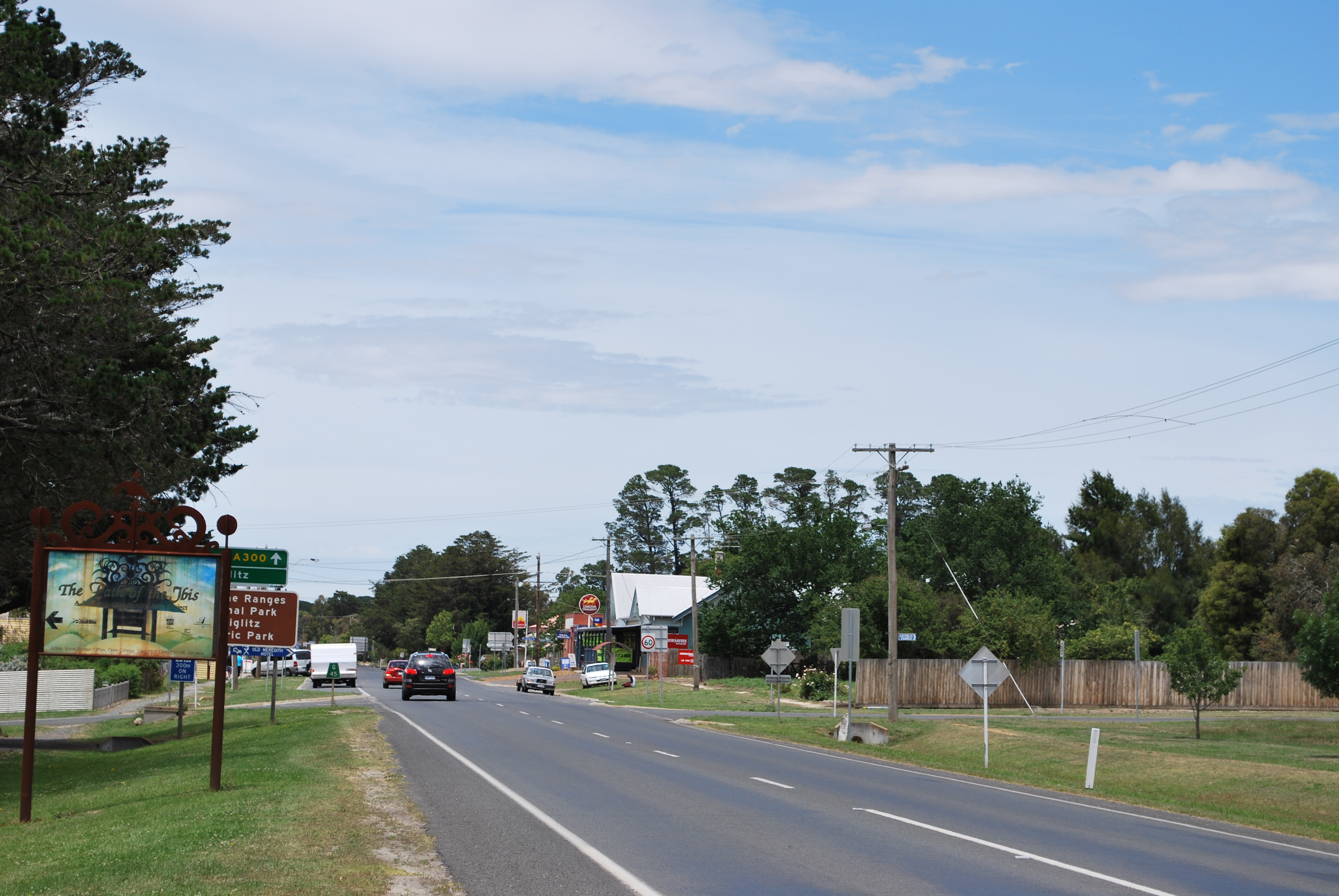
- Main street

- Coordinates: 37°50′0″S 144°04′0″E
- Country: Australia
- State: Victoria
- LGAs: Golden Plains Shire; Shire of Moorabool
- Location: 94 km (58 mi) W of Melbourne; 45 km (28 mi) NW of Geelong; 42 km (26 mi) SE of Ballarat

Government
  - State electorate: Eureka
  - Federal division: Ballarat

Population
  - Total: 821 (2021 census)
- Postcode: 3333
Localities around Meredith
Cargerie	Elaine; Morrisons	Durdidwarrah
Mount Mercer	Meredith	Steiglitz; She Oaks
Shelford	Bamganie	Lethbridge

Meredith is a town in Victoria, Australia, located on the Midland Highway between Ballarat and Geelong, in the local government area of the Golden Plains Shire. At the 2021 census, Meredith had a population of 821, an increase from the 788 at the 2016 census

== History ==
The town was surveyed in 1851–52. The town is believed to be named in honour of Captain Charles Meredith.

Meredith Post Office opened on 1 November 1854 and the railway came to the town with the opening of the Geelong-Ballarat line in 1862, with the local railway station opened soon after. Now only grain and freight trains use the line.

Darra, a house and stone cottage at 490 Slate Quarry Road, is listed on the Victorian Heritage Register.

The Anglican Church of the Epiphany is another heritage-listed building located in the town.

== Governance ==
The Meredith Road District (an early form of local government in Victoria) was established on 30 June 1863, and was redesignated as a shire on 28 April 1871. It absorbed Steiglitz Borough in 1881, and in turn was absorbed by Bannockburn Shire on 15 September 1915.

On 18 May 1993 part of Bannockburn Shire (including Meredith) was amalgamated with part of Barrabool Shire, and with Bellarine Rural City, Corio Shire, Geelong City, Geelong West City, Newtown City & South Barwon City, to form the local government area of Greater Geelong City.

== Present day ==
Meredith has been host to the Meredith Music Festival since 1991, and is also the closest locale to the Golden Plains Festival.

Golfers play at the course of the Meredith Golf Club on the Midland Highway.

Established in 1911, the Meredith Rural Fire Brigade (MRFB) has served to protect Meredith and surrounding areas from fires and other emergencies for over 100 years. The brigade consists entirely of volunteers. The MRFB's newest appliance is a 3.4C Heavy Tanker, which was bought through fundraising by CFA members and the Victorian Government.
