= Geelong–Ballarat railway line =

Broad-gauge railway in Australia

Geelong – Ballarat

Overview
- Status: Freight only
- Former connections: Lal Lal racecourse branch

Service
- Type: Regional
- System: Victorian Railways
- Rolling stock: 153 hp Walker railmotor (1950s - 1978)

History
- Work began: 10 April 1858
- Opened: 10 April 1862

Technical
- Number of tracks: Double track (until 1934); Single track with crossing loops

The Geelong–Ballarat railway line is a broad-gauge railway in western Victoria, Australia between the cities of Geelong and Ballarat. Towns along the route include Bannockburn, Lethbridge, Meredith, Elaine and Lal Lal. Major traffic includes general freight from the Mildura line, and grain.

== History ==
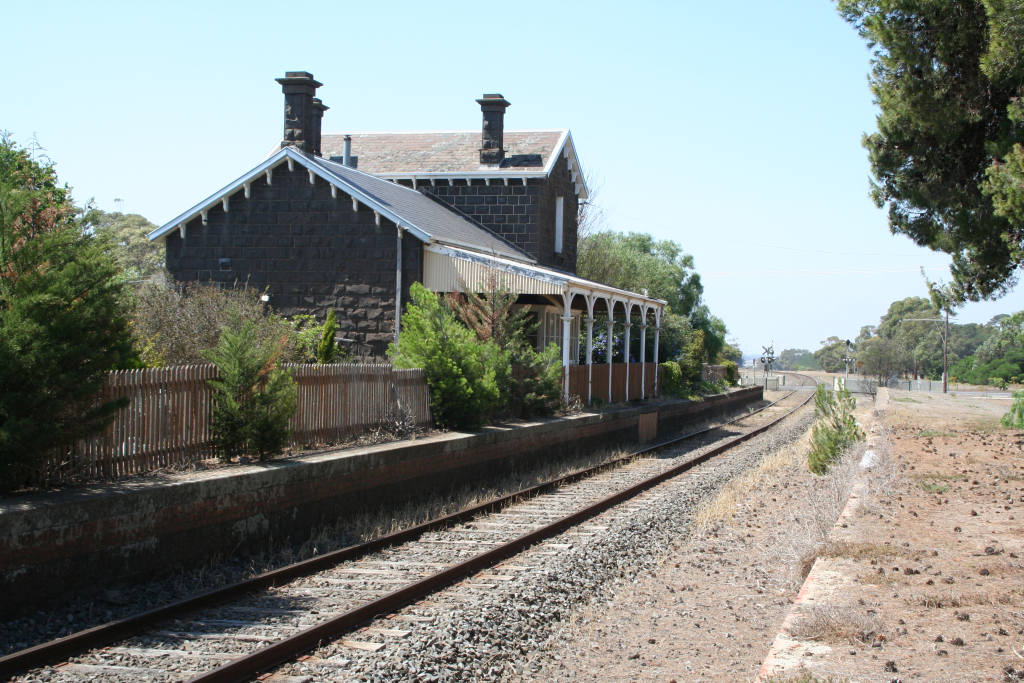
Now privately occupied Bannockburn station, 2007

After the railway from Melbourne to Geelong was opened in 1857, agitation soon started in Ballarat for a railway link to serve the rapidly growing gold mining area.

The prospectus for the £1,000,000 "Geelong, Ballaarat and North Western Railway Company" (the alternative spelling "Ballaarat" persisted until the early 1990s) was advertised in January 1854 The promoters of the railway were many of the same who had launched the Geelong and Melbourne Railway Company two years before. Francis Bell was appointed as the engineer. He surveyed and designed the line, and lithographed plans were made available with the prospectus.

However, private railway companies formed in Victoria at the time found it difficult to raise the necessary capital locally or in London, so the Victorian colonial government took over the construction of trunk railway lines to Ballarat and Bendigo. The engineer-in-chief of the Victorian Railways, George Darbyshire, made use of Bell's plans during construction.

Construction work on the Geelong – Ballarat railway began in 1858 under the supervision of the Victorian Railways engineer Robert Watson, and the official opening occurred on 10 April 1862. The line was built to a high standard, with double track provided throughout, bluestone station buildings at all of the initial stations, a number of bluestone bridges for roads that crossed the line, and the substantial 1,450-foot (440 m) Moorabool Viaduct over the river of the same name. The line remained the only rail route from Ballarat to Melbourne until 1889, when the Melbourne to Ballarat line opened.

The Geelong–Ballarat railway line took nearly four years to complete, employing up to 3,000 men and costing approximately £1.5 million. The line officially opened in 1862, with the first train running on 10 April. Trains took about four and a half hours to reach Geelong from Ballarat, travelling at a maximum speed of 15 mph (24 km/h) and having to overcome several difficulties, including sometimes failing an uphill grade or running out of firewood for fuel. The return journey, however, was achieved in two hours and forty minutes.

The Geelong to Ballarat line connected with the Geelong railway at North Geelong station, and when the direct line from Ballarat to Melbourne was opened, it branched off at Warrenheip station. Single-tracking of the Geelong to Ballarat line commenced in 1892, but the majority remained double-tracked until 1934, when the 53-kilometre section from Bannockburn to Warrenheip was singled. In 1913 the Gheringhap–Maroona line was opened, junctioning with the line at Gheringhap.

In 1978, passenger services on the line were withdrawn after the 153hp Walker railmotor used to operate them fell into disrepair, and a permanent replacement bus service was introduced. Passenger trains from Ballarat and beyond continued to use the Geelong–Ballarat line as an alternate route to Melbourne until the 1990s, but did not stop at any stations along the line.

In 1995, the track between North Geelong and Gheringhap was converted to dual gauge as part of the gauge standardisation of the Melbourne–Adelaide railway. Also at that time, the seven-kilometre section of double track from Ballarat to Warrenheip was converted to two parallel and independent lines, one running to Geelong and one to Melbourne, with the junction at Warrenheip being abolished. In 2008 track upgrading work commenced on the line as part of the rail freight improvements to the Mildura line. Improvements included installing gauge-convertible sleepers, the dual-gauging of level crossings, and drainage and ballast renewal. Upgrade work was completed in 2009.

To commemorate the 150th anniversary of the opening of the Geelong-Ballarat railway, a special train ran from Geelong to Ballarat and return on Tuesday 10 April 2012, and further celebrations were held during the following weekend, on 14 & 15 April.

As part of its election policy, the state Coalition government, elected in November 2010, instituted a study into reintroducing passenger services on the line. The so-called "Rail Revival Study", obtained by the Herald Sun in mid-2013 using Freedom of Information laws, concluded that returning rail passenger services to the line was not viable due to the high cost. Despite a push in November 2013 to re-open these railway sections for passenger traffic, nothing ended up happening, with the line remaining freight-only.

== Line guide ==
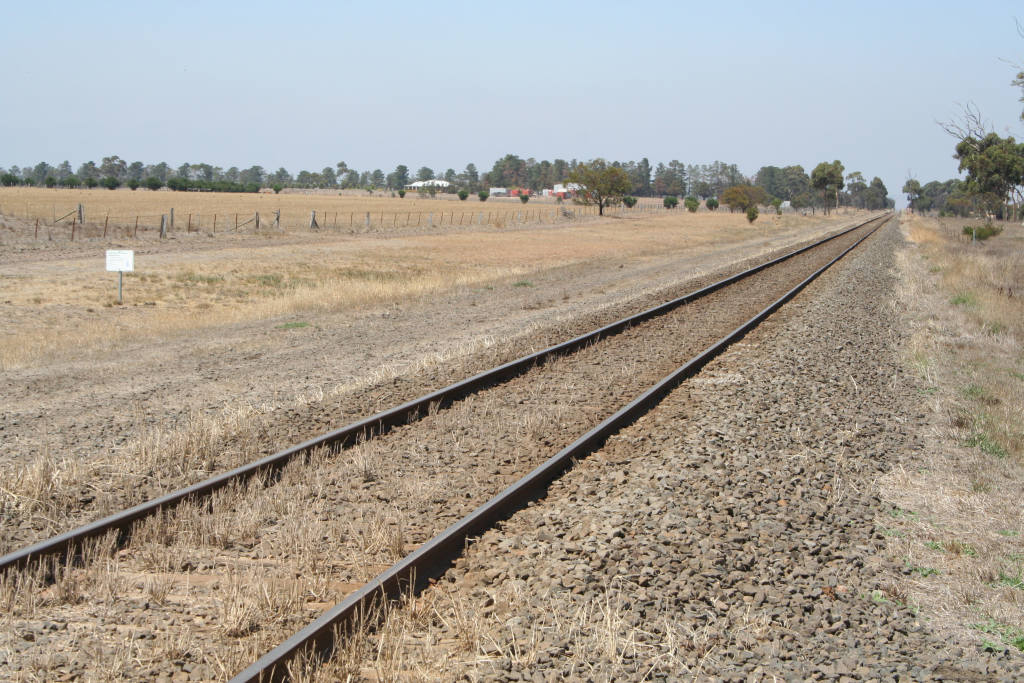
Line near Bannockburn, 2007

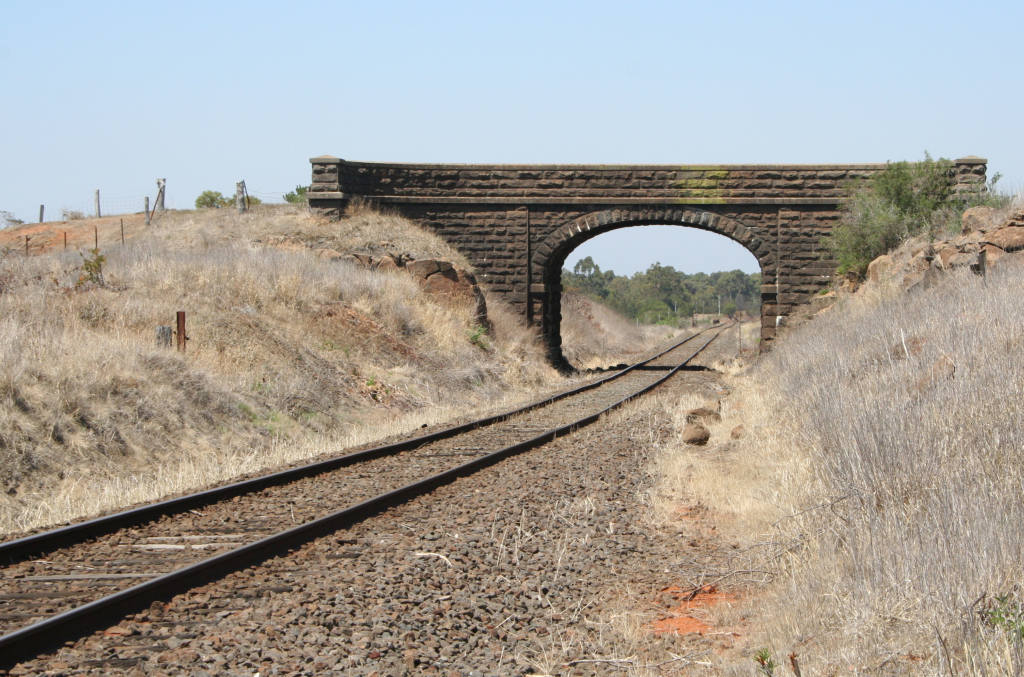
Bluestone road overbridge near Lethbridge, 2007

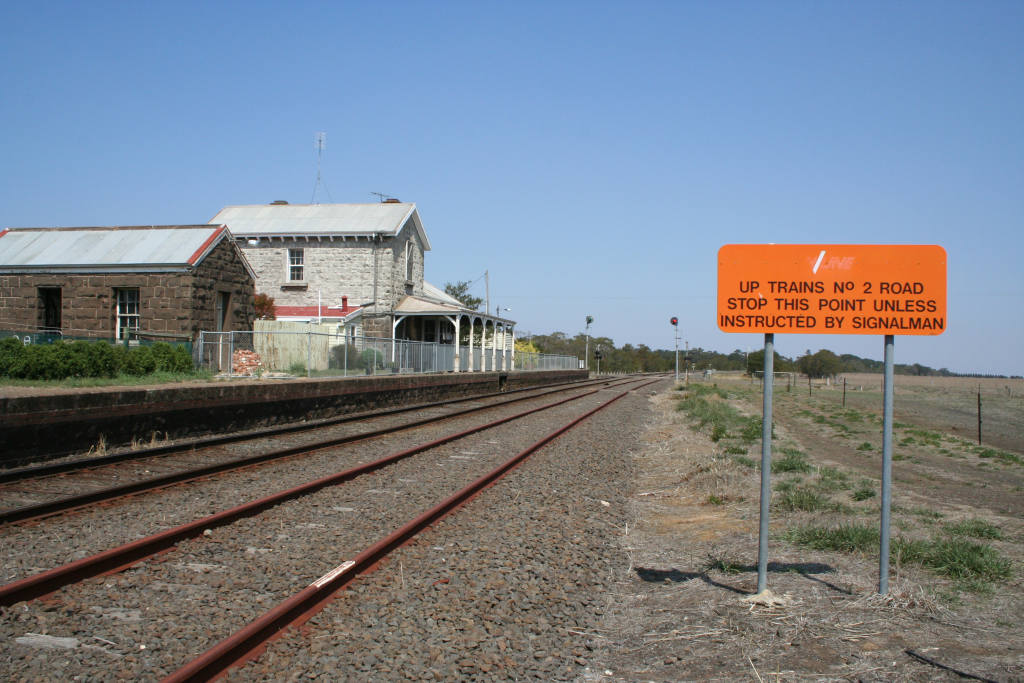
Meredith station and crossing loop, 2007

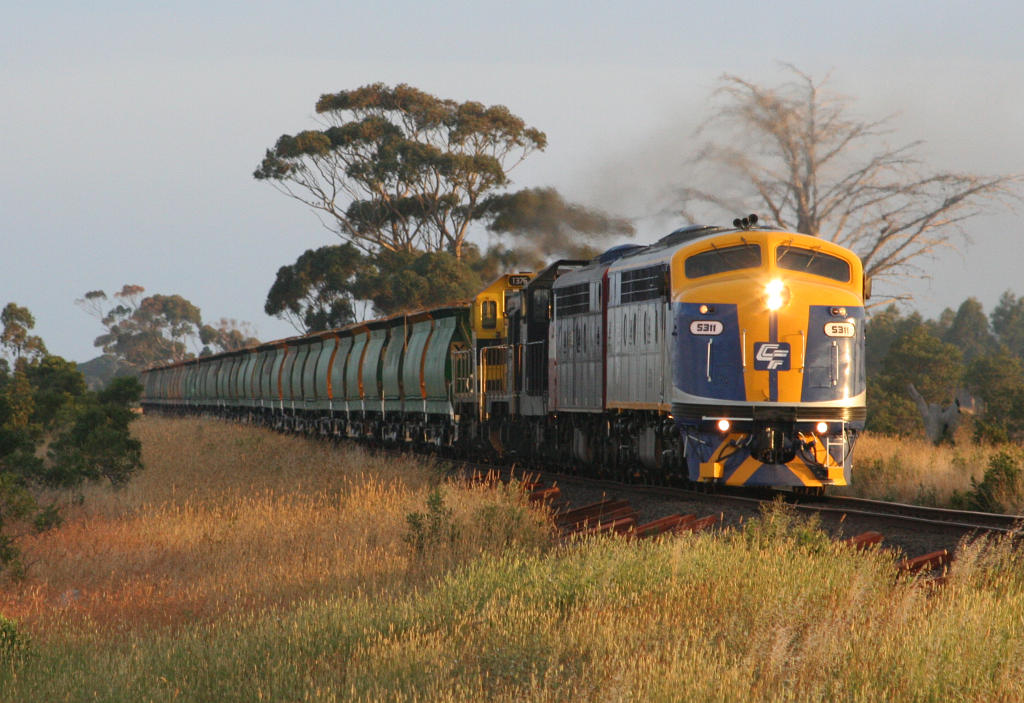
Grain train near Meredith, 2008

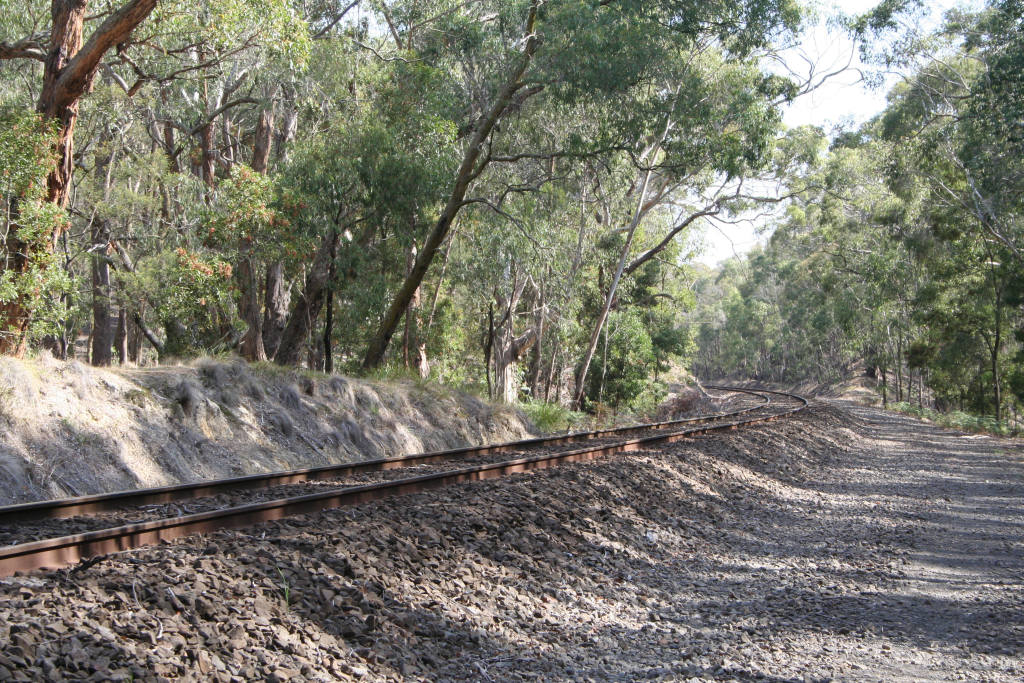
Near Lal Lal, 2007

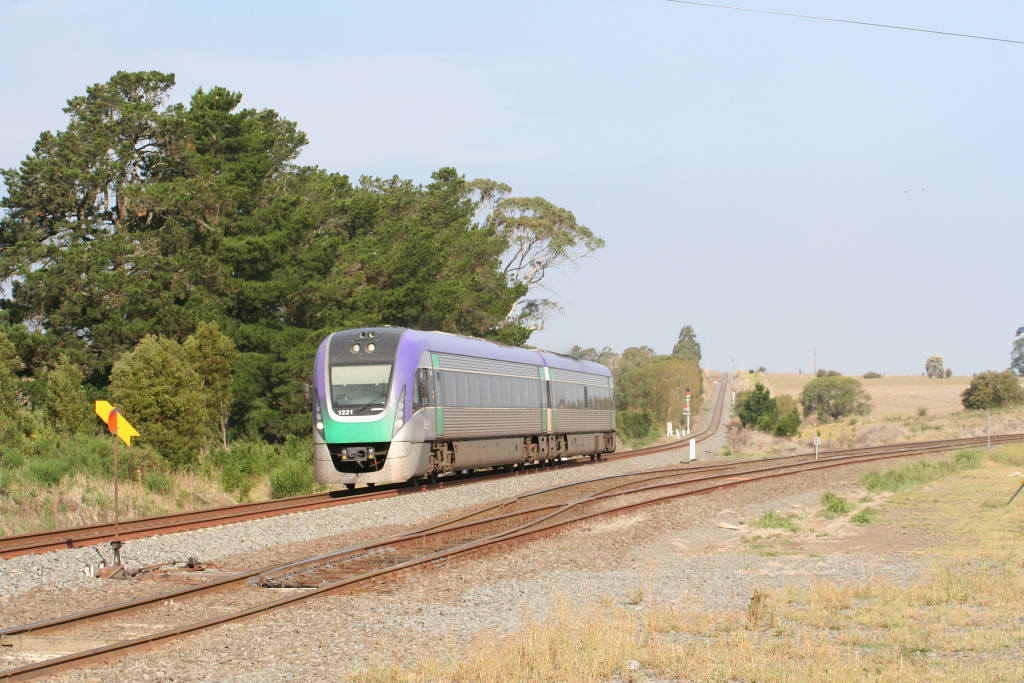
Train on the Melbourne-Ballarat line at the disconnected former junction with the Geelong-Ballarat line at Warrenheip, 2007

The line uses centralised traffic control on the 13.5 km dual gauge section between North Geelong and Gheringhap, and Train Order Working from there. Unattended crossing loops exist at Gheringhap and Warrenheip.

== Engineering heritage ==
The line received an Engineering Heritage Marker from Engineers Australia as part of its Engineering Heritage Recognition Program.
