= Staughton Vale =

- Town
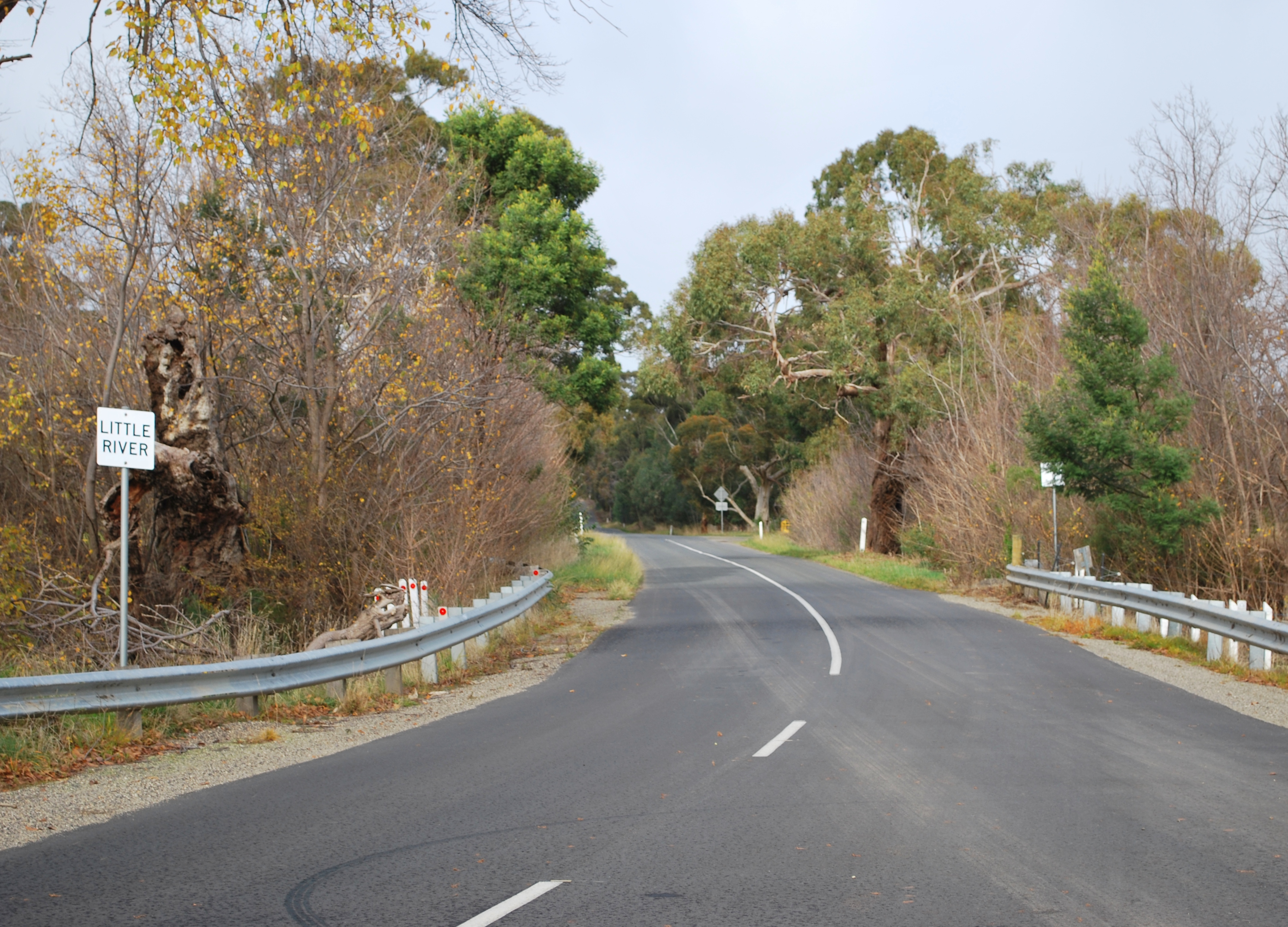
- Bridge over the Little River at Staughton Vale

- Coordinates: 37°50′47″S 144°16′55″E
- Country: Australia
- State: Victoria
- LGA: City of Greater Geelong

Government
  - State electorate: Lara
  - Federal division: Corio

Population
  - Total: 98 (2016 census)
- Postcode: 3340
Localities around Staughton Vale
Durdidwarrah	Beremboke	Balliang
Steiglitz	Staughton Vale	Balliang
Maude	Anakie	Anakie

Staughton Vale is a locality in the City of Greater Geelong, Victoria, Australia. Its local government area is the City of Greater Geelong.

The south-east section of the Brisbane Ranges National Park takes up most of the locality's area. There is also a rural campus of Bacchus Marsh Grammar School and an outdoor education centre camp run by Northern Bay College. Most of the private properties in the locality are on Staughton Vale Road.

The post office at Staughton Vale opened on 1 January 1873, closed on 24th of November 1873, reopened on 14 July 1886, closed again on 16 May 1891, opened again and was renamed as Staughton Vale State School on 23 August 1905, was renamed back to Staughton Vale, then closed on 30 September 1968.
