= Mount Rothwell =

Mount Rothwell Victoria
- Coordinates: 37.88112°S 144.44142°E
- Established: 1850
- Postcode(s): 3211
- Elevation: 22 m (72 ft)
- Location: 51 km (32 mi) from Melbourne; 31 km (19 mi) from Geelong
- LGA(s): City of Greater Geelong; City of Wyndham
- State electorate(s): Werribee; Lara
- Federal division(s): Corio; Lalor
Localities around Mount Rothwell:
Balliang	Quandong	Mambourin
Anakie	Mount Rothwell	Werribee
Lara	Little River	Little River

Mount Rothwell is a locality in Victoria, Australia, located to the north east of the You Yangs hills, between Bacchus Marsh and Werribee.

It is the location of the Mount Rothwell wildlife sanctuary and the historic Mount Rothwell homestead, built in 1873 for Pastoralist Robert Chirnside, (listed on the Victorian Heritage Register (H1107), inherited on his father's death in 1918 by his grandson Dr James Chirnside, and occupied by the Chirnside family until about 2000.

The homestead was used for filming of the 2003 Ned Kelly, and was purchased in 2000 along with the estate by the Mount Rothwell Biodiversity Interpretation Centre.

Nearby is the Mount Rothwell Aboriginal stone arrangement known as Wurdi Youang and the ruins of the Mount Rothwell Hotel.
