= Little River, Victoria =

Little River
- Town
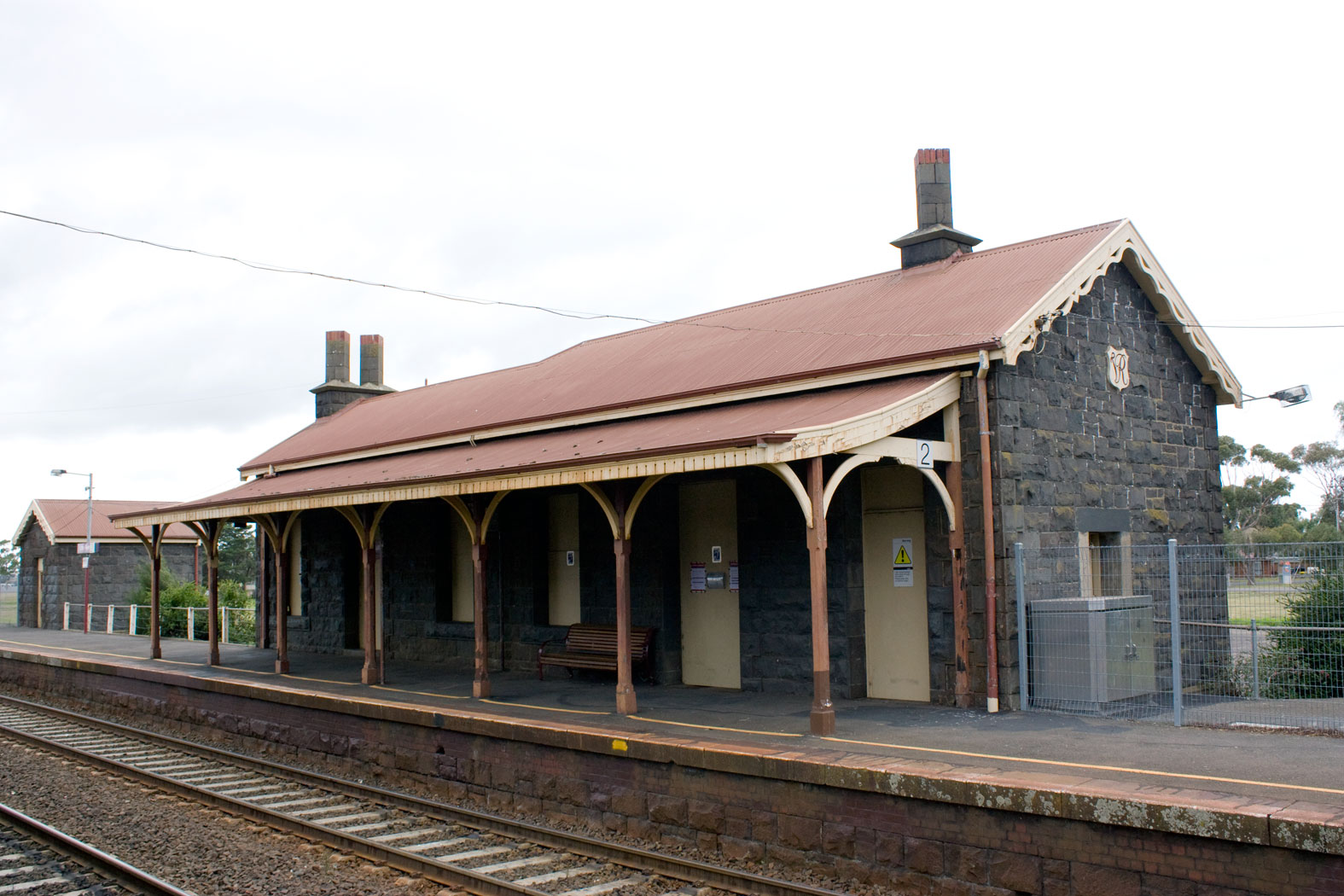
- Little River Railway Station

- Interactive map of Little River
- Coordinates: 37.933°S 144.500°E
- Country: Australia
- State: Victoria
- LGAs: City of Greater Geelong; City of Wyndham
- Location: 44 km (27 mi) from Melbourne; 31 km (19 mi) from Geelong
- Established: 1840

Government
  - State electorates: Werribee; Lara
  - Federal division: Corio
- Elevation: 22 m (72 ft)

Population
  - Total: 1,353 (2021 census)
- Postcode: 3211
Localities around Little River
Balliang	Quandong	Mambourin
Anakie	Little River	Werribee
Anakie	Lara	Point Wilson and Cocoroc

Little River is a town in Victoria, Australia, approximately 44 kilometres (27 mi) south-west of Melbourne's Central Business District, located within the Cities of Greater Geelong and Wyndham local government areas. Little River recorded a population of 1,353 at the 2021 census.

== History ==
=== Aboriginal history ===
In the vicinity of Mount Rothwell, near Little River, a semi-circular Aboriginal stone arrangement now known as Wurdi Youang and believed to have been built by the local Wadawurrung people, was discovered and in 2011 described by an astrophysicist from the CSIRO as accurately indicating the setting sun during the solstices and equinox. Although the age is unknown, it could range from 200 to 30,000 years.

=== Early settlement ===
The Little River has headwaters in the nearby Brisbane Ranges. It was also known as the Cocoroc Rivulet, Cocoroc being a locality near the area. Where the road from Melbourne to Geelong crossed Little River, the Travellers Rest Inn was opened there in about 1839.

It had been one of the Port Phillip Association's pastoral runs (the first occupier being James Simpson), and later a large part of the district was included in the Chirnside Estate centred on Werribee. Early on small farmers had the benefit of an 80 square kilometres (31 sq mi) common for grazing.

Many of the early settlers of the region were Scottish Gaelic-speaking immigrants from Lochaber and Moidart, who had been evicted by Ranald George Macdonald, 19th Chief of Clanranald, during the Highland Clearances and Highland Potato Famine. The bulk of them, whose passage to Australia was aided by the Highland and Island Emigration Society, arrived at Port Phillip in 1852. They were eventually joined at Little River in 1857 by their former parish priest from Fort William, Fr Ranald Rankin (c.1786-1863), who is best known as the author of the Scottish Gaelic Christmas carol Tàladh Chrìosda ("The Christ Child's Lullaby"). According to John Watts, Little River and Belmont were the main population centers of Roman Catholic Gaels from Moidart. Writing during the 1880s, Fr Charles Macdonald commented ruefully that at least some of these Scottish Australians, who were immigrants from a Scottish region with a long history of smuggling, illegal whiskey distilling, and cattle raiding and who had often, "left the old county against their will", continued these same practices in the Australian frontier.

The Post Office opened on 1 February 1858.

The railway line through the town was opened in 1857, as part of the line to Geelong. The local railway station is served by V/Line passenger services on the Geelong line.

=== Heritage sites ===
Little River contains a number of heritage listed sites, including:

- 19-27 River Street, Little River railway station
- 985-995 Little River-Ripley Road, Mount Rothwell Homestead
- Old Melbourne Road, Rothwell Bridge
- 795-805 Old Melbourne Road, Travellers' Rest (Rothwell Ruins)

== Today ==
The township has a petrol station and post office, a primary school, a kindergarten, a pub, a bed and breakfast, a park, two playgrounds, a train station, a cricket ground and several churches. Visitors from Melbourne pass through the town on the way to the You Yangs Regional Park and the Mount Rothwell Biodiversity Interpretation Centre.

Australian rock band Little River Band is named after Little River after seeing the name on a road sign on their way to a gig in Geelong.

== Film-making location ==
Some scenes for the Australian television series We Can Be Heroes: Finding The Australian of the Year and Angry Boys were filmed at Little River, although it was referred to as the fictional town of 'Dunt'. Little River also featured in filming the movie Mad Max, starring Mel Gibson, with Little River Road being used as the movie's infamous "Highway 9".

Some parts of Little River and surrounding areas were filmed in the Australian television drama series, Blue Heelers. Also, some scenes from the 2003 Australian Western film, Ned Kelly were shot in the nearby You Yangs.

Little River, and surrounding areas, also featured in the filming of the 2015 comedy-drama The Dressmaker, starring Kate Winslet, Liam Hemsworth, and Judy Davis.

== Census populations ==
Little River, Victoria
Year	Population	Source(s)
1861	4	
1871	121	
1911	294	
1954	358	
1966	191	
2001	353	
2006	1,744	
2011	1,393	
2016	1,322	
2021	1,353	

== See also ==
- City of Werribee – Parts of Little River were previously within this former local government area.
- Shire of Corio – Parts of Little River were previously within this former local government area.
