= Steiglitz, Victoria =

Steiglitz
- Town
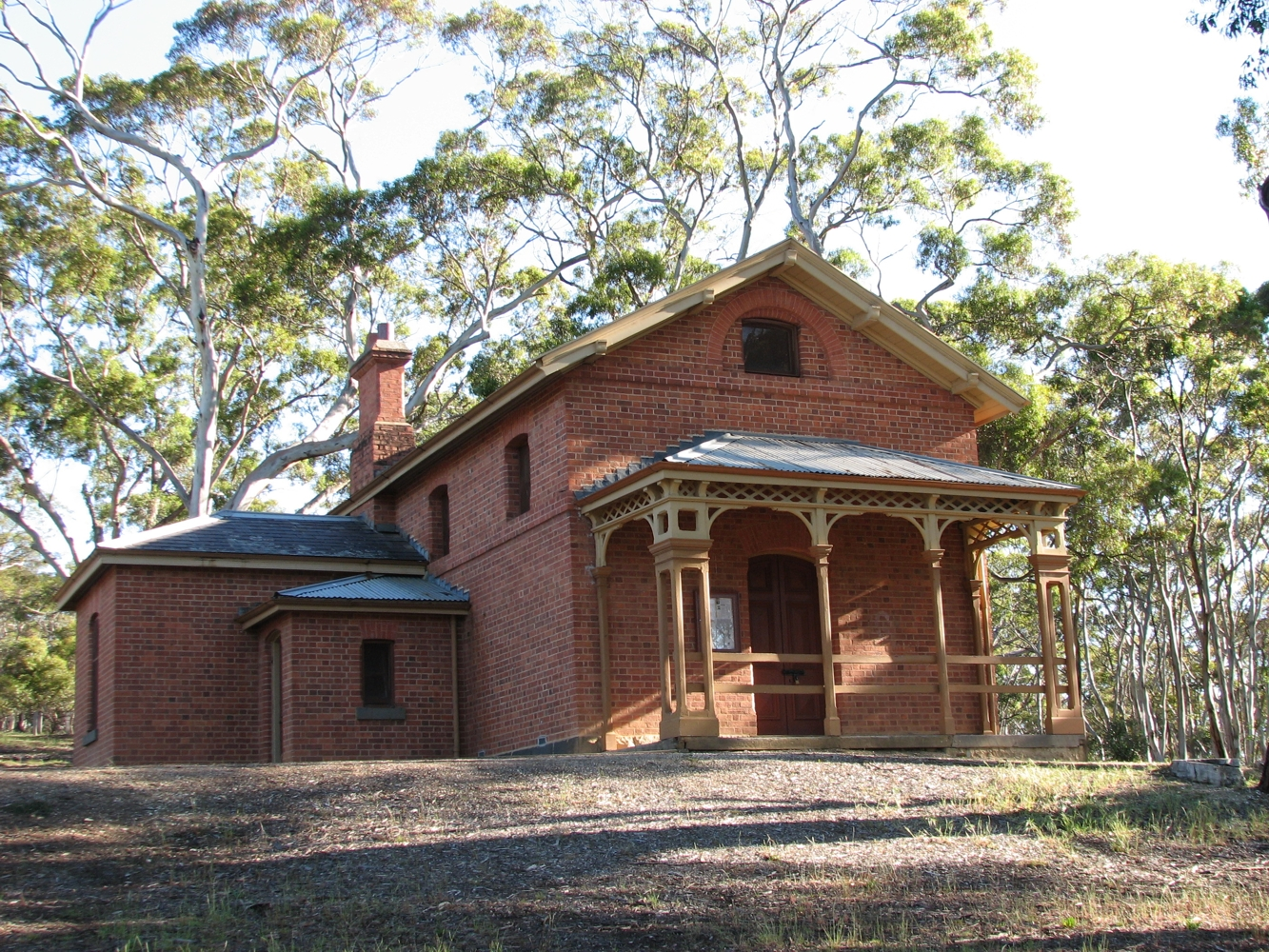
- Courthouse

- Coordinates: 37°52′0″S 144°10′0″E
- Country: Australia
- State: Victoria
- LGA: Golden Plains Shire
- Location: 83 km (52 mi) W of Melbourne; 39 km (24 mi) NW of Geelong; 12 km (7.5 mi) E of Meredith

Government
  - State electorate: Eureka
  - Federal division: Ballarat

Population
  - Total: 61 (SAL 2021)
- Postcode: 3331
Localities around Steiglitz
Durdidwarrah	Durdidwarrah	Staughton Vale
Meredith	Steiglitz	Staughton Vale
She Oaks	Maude	Anakie

Steiglitz is a locality in the Brisbane Ranges in Victoria. It is located 83 kilometres (52 mi) west of the state capital, Melbourne, Australia. At the 2021 census, the Steiglitz area had a population of 61.

== History ==
The von Stieglitz family bought and settled the land on which Steiglitz now sits in 1835. They returned to Ireland in 1853, but retained ownership of the land, upon which gold was found the following year; it became the first auriferous quartz-mining site in Victoria. A settlement of gold-prospectors quickly developed, and took its (misspelled) name from the land's owners. The population reached 2000 by 1863, including roughly 220 Chinese immigrants. The easily-won gold had been worked out by the late 1870s, and many people moved away. The last gold mine closed in 1941 and, as of 2015, the population of the town site was just eight. The Steiglitz historic park was opened in 1976 with the intention of preserving Steiglitz as an example of an abandoned gold-mining town, and several historic buildings were restored.

=== Historic Buildings ===
The Steiglitz Post Office's history closely follows that of the town: it opened on 15 March 1856 and closed in 1966, and is now a private residence.

The former Steiglitz Court House, built in 1874, just as the town began to experience a significant decline in population, is listed on the Victorian Heritage Register. It is now a volunteer-run museum.

A small wooden Catholic church, St Thomas' Catholic Church, was built in 1868–9. In 1951 the building was moved to Norlane where it served as a church hall, until it was returned to Steiglitz in 1982 as part of the restoration efforts; its churchyard continues to hold only a single grave. Similarly, St Paul's Anglican Church, which had been built in 1871, ceased functioning in 1962, but was restored in 1988 and 1994, having remained in Steiglitz for the whole period.

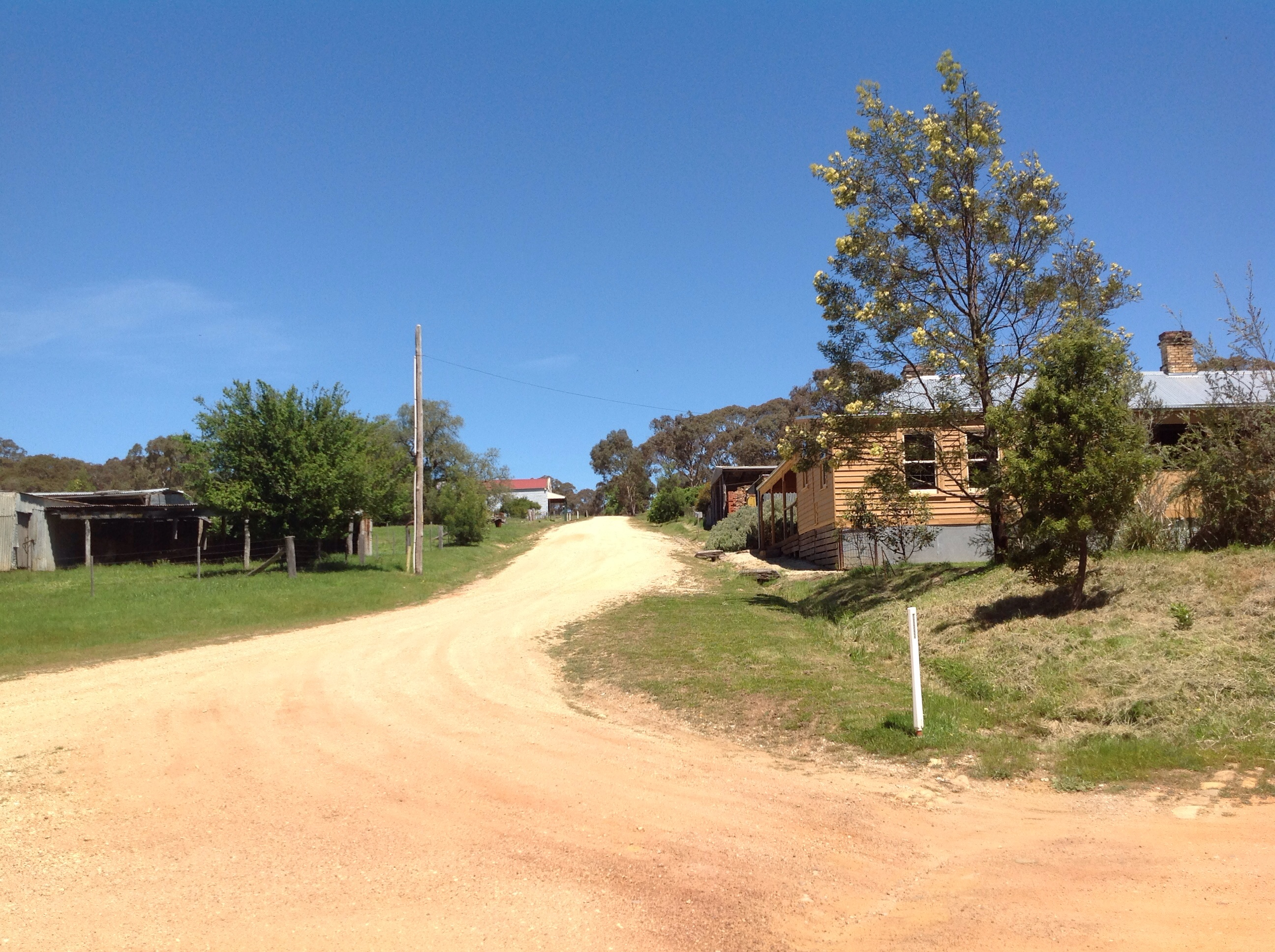
Regent Street. In colonial gold rush days, shops, hotels, banks, mines and houses occupied both sides, as well as surrounding streets. The building at the bottom left is the former Scott's hotel. Up the hill on the right is the former Ellis drapery.
