= Carisbrook stone arrangement =

Coordinates: 37°04′14″S 143°51′20″E

The Carisbrook stone arrangement is a well-preserved Aboriginal stone arrangement in Victoria, Australia. It measures 60 by 5 metres (197 by 16 ft) and is one of only four stone arrangements in the state and the only one of a boomerang design. It is located about 5 km south-east of the town of Carisbrook, on the banks of Tullaroop Creek.

It was initially surveyed in the 1980s by the Victorian Archaeological Survey following reporting by a local landowner. The first report of the discovery of the Carisbrook stone arrangement and its interpretation as an Aboriginal ceremonial site, was not until the 1960s, as there was little recording of Aboriginal ceremonies in the district in the early years of European settlement, and no traditions passed down among Aboriginal descendants. There are also a number of stone circles and a cairn.

The site consists of a double arc shape of boulders, a cairn of stones and other small stone circles. The arc shape is often thought to represent a boomerang. However, it has a regular curve and both sides are parallel without pinching in at the ends which is not the true shape of a boomerang. Some interpretations have also suggested it may be aligned with some sort of astronomical observations. For example, that the "...arc shape represents the Milky Way, the cairn is Sirius or some other bright star and two of the circles the Magellan Clouds". The ends of the crescent point to the cardinal points. It has been considered by some to be a male initiation ground, mainly on the basis of comparison with other similar sites in NSW.

This arrangement is believed to fall within the traditional land of the Wurn balug clan of the Djadjawurrung.

Following its rediscovery in 1963, interest was focussed on its interpretation and protection, with initial protection provided under the Archaeological Relics Office. In 1975, the area was purchased by the State government, and made a Declared Archaeological Area under the provisions of the Archaeological and Aboriginal Relics Protection Act 1972. Aboriginal Affairs Victoria first purchased the river frontage in the late 1980s. The Indigenous Land Council purchased the farm in 1997 and have divested it to the Ballarat Aboriginal Co-op determined to be the custodians.

== See also ==
- Lake Bolac stone arrangement
- Wurdi Youang
