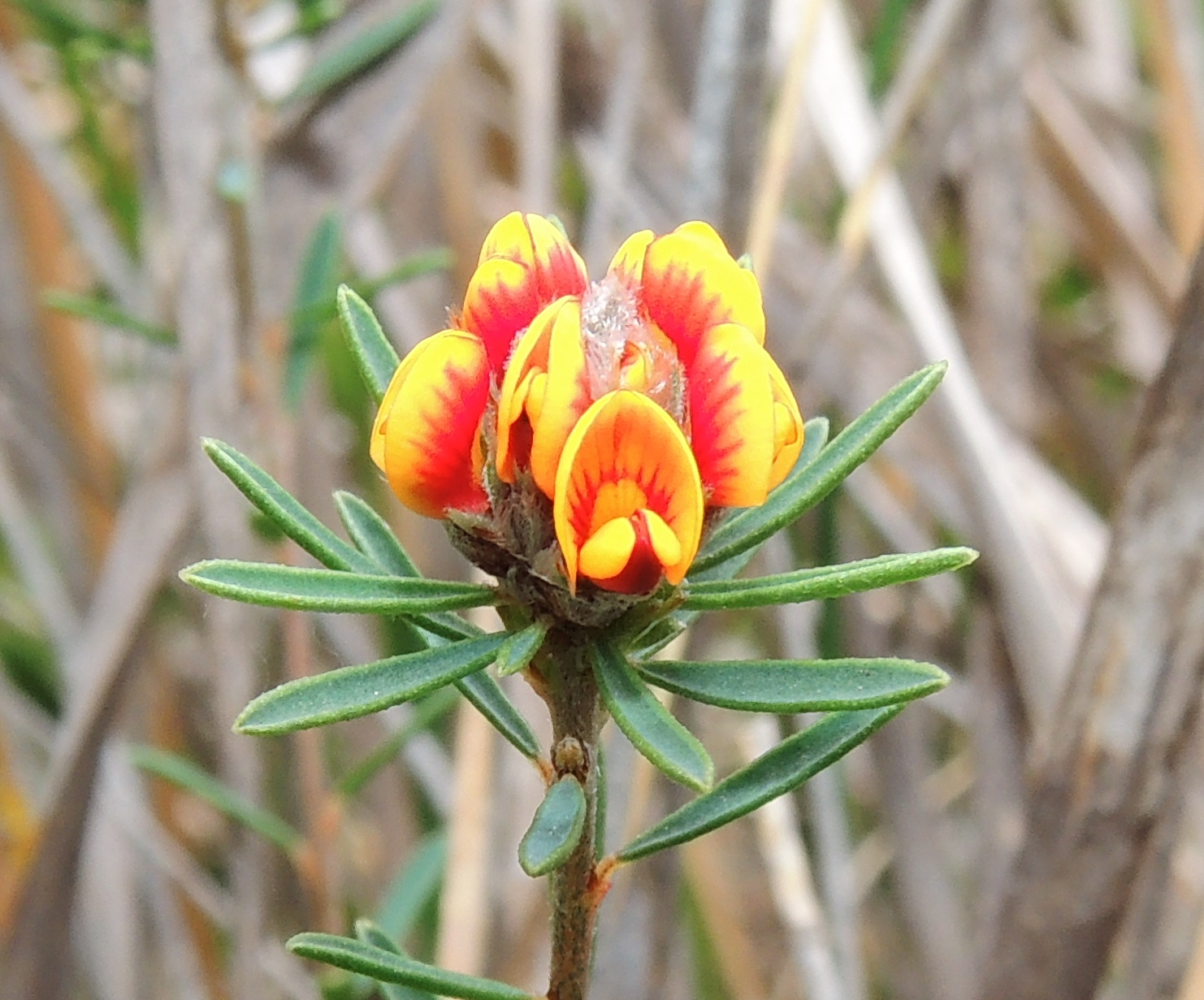
- Pultenaea dentata near Beremboke, Victoria

Scientific classification
- Kingdom: Plantae
- Clade: Tracheophytes
- Clade: Angiosperms
- Clade: Eudicots
- Clade: Rosids
- Order: Fabales
- Family: Fabaceae
- Subfamily: Faboideae
- Genus: Pultenaea
- Species: P. dentata

Binomial name
- Pultenaea dentata Labill.

Synonyms
- Pultenaea argentea A.Cunn.; Pultenaea pimelioides Hook.f.

= Pultenaea dentata =

Clustered bush-pea

Species of legume

Pultenaea dentata, commonly known as clustered bush-pea, is a species of flowering plant in the family Fabaceae and is endemic to south-eastern Australia. It is an erect to low-lying or prostrate, open shrub with elliptic to narrow egg-shaped leaves and dense clusters of yellow, red and purple flowers.

== Description ==
Pultenaea dentata is an erect to low-lying or prostrate, openly-branched shrub that typically grows to a height of 20–80 cm (7.9–31.5 in) and has wiry stems. The leaves are elliptic to egg-shaped or lance-shaped with the narrower end towards the base, 5–12 mm (0.20–0.47 in) long, 0.5–2 mm (0.020–0.079 in) wide and dished on the upper surface. There are triangular to lance-shaped stipules 1–2 mm (0.039–0.079 in) long at the base of the leaves. The flowers are densely clustered in groups of more than six on the ends of the branchlets, with dark brown, egg-shaped bracts. The sepals are 5–6 mm (0.20–0.24 in) long with three-lobed bracteoles 2.0–2.5 mm (0.079–0.098 in) long attached to the base of the sepal tube. The standard petal is bright yellow with red markings, the wings are yellow and the keel is purple with a yellow base. Flowering occurs from October to December and the fruit is a flattened, egg-shaped pod.

== Taxonomy and naming ==
Pultenaea dentata was first formally described in 1805 by Jacques Labillardière in Novae Hollandiae Plantarum Specimen. The specific epithet (Densifolia) means "toothed".

== Distribution and habitat ==
This Pultenaea grows in swampy heath or on the edges of streams in south-eastern, Queensland, on the coast and tablelands of New South Wales, southern Victoria, south-eastern South Australia and in Tasmania where it is widespread and common.
