= Little River (Greater Geelong) =

River in Victoria, Australia

Little River Worrin-yaloke
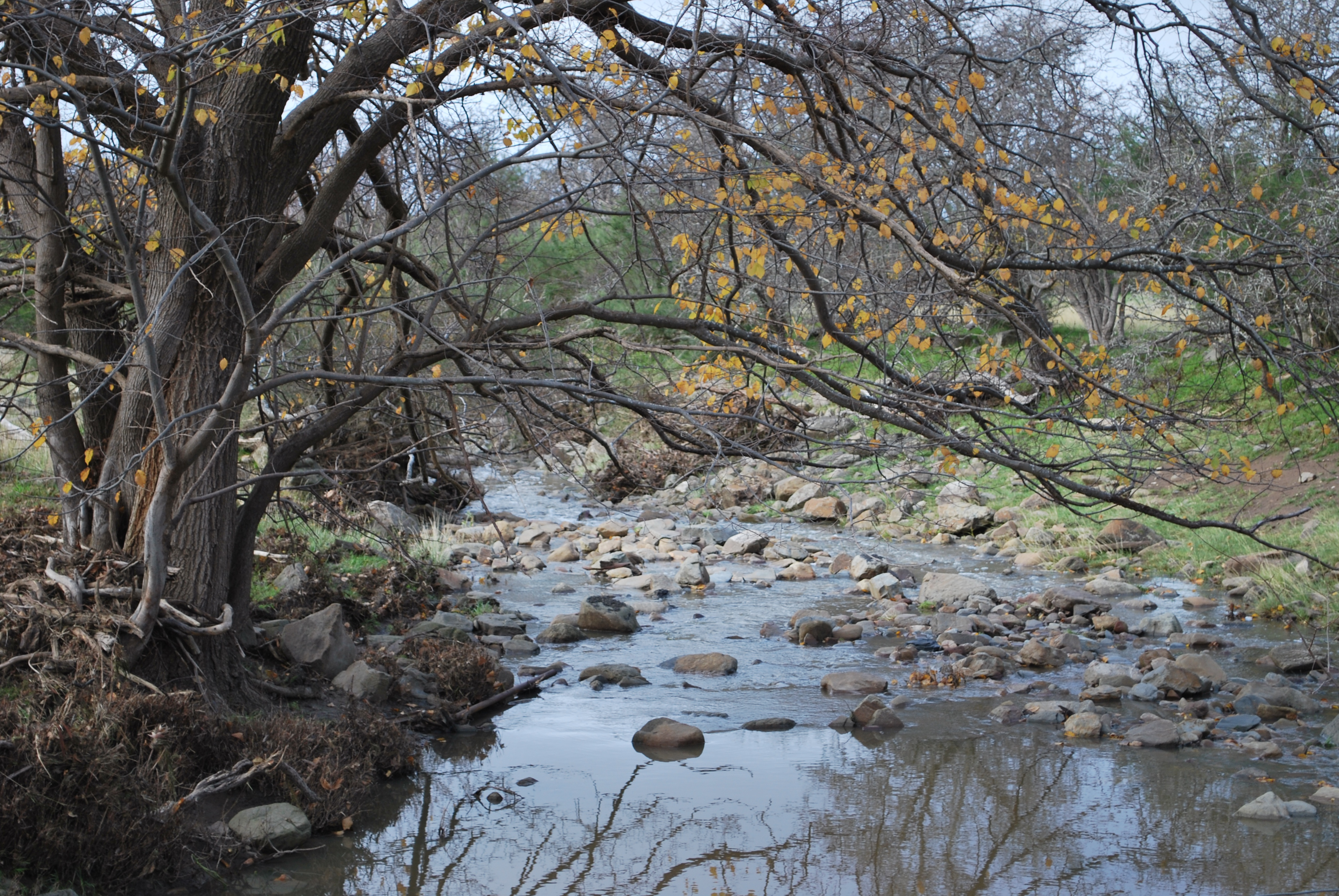
- Little River, near its source in Staughton Vale

- Location of the Little River mouth in Victoria
- Native name: Diabagnorite (Wathawurrung)

Location
- Country: Australia
- State: Victoria
- Region: Victorian Midlands (IBRA), Greater Metropolitan Melbourne
- LGA: City of Greater Geelong, City of Wyndham
- Town: Little River

Physical characteristics
- Source: Brisbane Ranges
  - location: Staughton Vale
  - coordinates: 37°49′35″S 144°16′57″E
  - elevation: 176 m (577 ft)
- Mouth: Port Phillip
  - location: north of Beacon Point
  - coordinates: 38°0′20″S 144°45′42″E
  - elevation: 0 m (0 ft)
- Length: 49 km (30 mi)

Basin features
- River system: Port Phillip & Westernport catchment
- Tributaries
  - left: Balliang Creek
  - right: Stony Creek (Greater Geelong), Reilly Creek

The Little River, also known as Cocoroc Rivulet, is a perennial stream of the Port Phillip catchment, in the Werribee Plain of south-central Victoria, Australia. The river and its left-bank tributary, Balliang Creek, serve as the natural border between the metropolitan areas of Greater Melbourne and Greater Geelong.

== Course and features ==
The Little River rises in the Brisbane Ranges near Staughton Vale, and flows generally southeast through the Werribee Plain northeast of the You Yangs, joined by three minor tributaries, before reaching its mouth at western Port Phillip Bay, north of Beacon Point near the boundary between the City of Greater Geelong and the City of Wyndham. The river descends 176 metres (577 ft) over its 49 kilometres (30 mi) course.

== Etymology ==
The traditional Aboriginal name of the river is Diabagnorite or Worrin-yaloke.

== See also ==
- List of rivers of Australia
- Little River Band
- Werribee and Avalon Important Bird Area
