= Boneseed in Australia =

Boneseed and closely related Bitou Bush are two subspecies of Chrysanthemoides monilifera, an invasive species in Australia. It was listed on the Weeds of National Significance in 2000 and is one of the 20 most significant weeds in Australia because of its invasiveness, potential for spread, and environmental and economic impacts. C. monilifera has a particularly wide potential range. It is predicted that over time C. monilifera could significantly expand its current distribution to almost all of South Eastern Australia apart from the Alps.

== History ==
Boneseed was introduced to Australia as an ornamental garden plant from the mid-nineteenth century, with examples first recorded in gardens in Sydney in 1852 and Melbourne in 1858. It is thought that Boneseed had become naturalised in Australia, with self-sustaining populations, from around 1910. Bitou Bush arrived slightly later in around 1908, most likely in the ballast of a South African ship docked off New South Wales. Thereafter both subspecies were planted extensively to stabilise coastal sand dunes and control erosion, particularly from the mid-1940s to the 1960s, with Boneseed more commonly planted in Victoria and Bitou Bush more commonly planted in NSW and Southern Queensland. Boneseed was introduced to the You Yangs, south west of Melbourne, Victoria, to control soil erosion.

By the late-1960s both species of C. monilifera had come to be recognised as significant weeds. Boneseed was proclaimed a noxious weed in Victoria in 1969. Not long thereafter, the Australian Institute of Agricultural Science (AIAS) suggested that Boneseed could potentially be "the most important weed on public land in southern Victoria" due to its ability to colonise areas of bushland without the level of significant disturbance often required by other weedy species. In fact, the AIAS estimated that by 1976 Boneseed had colonised around 405 hectares in the You Yangs, with an even larger area affected on the Mornington Peninsula. Since then the population's expansion has been dramatic, and in the You Yangs, by 2003 it was estimated that Boneseed had extended its presence to around 1300 hectares of the 2000-hectare park.

== Impact ==
C. monilifera has been particularly successful in invading natural bushland. In part, this is due to the species' ability to establish on relatively nutrient-poor soils and in areas exposed to salt such as coastlines, as well as the ability of the seeds to germinate readily. Disturbances such as fire can assist C. monilifera to spread as the plant produces a large amount of seed that can persist in the soil seed bank for 10 years or more, and this reserve in turn enables the species to quickly recolonize a burnt area.

== See also ==
- Invasive species in Australia
