= You Yangs Regional Park =

Park in Victoria, Australia

Coordinates: 37.903032°S 144.431763°E

The You Yangs Regional Park is a park in southern central Victoria, Australia. The park encompasses much of the southern areas of the You Yangs, a granite range that rises from the Werribee Plains, 60 km southwest of Melbourne. The park is operated and managed by Parks Victoria and is open during daylight hours.

Situated within the traditional boundaries of the Wathawurrung (Wathaurong/Wada Wurrung) Aboriginal tribal lands and once home to the Yawangi Baluk (local clan whose territory extended to Port Philip), the You Yangs (Wurdi-Yawang) shares historical significance with Australians of non-indigenous origin.

A road known as Great Circle Drive, encircles Flinders Peak, enabling drivers, cyclists and walkers to navigate the undulating terrain, from flat forested areas to hilly scenic views. The road passes by many lookouts, rest areas, picnic areas, barbecues and other features.

== Access ==
The main public entrance to the park is located on Branch Road, near the intersection of Forest Road North, 5 km north of Lara and 5 km west of Little River. The gate is open daylight hours. Sandy Creek Road also passes through the park's western area, providing a link between Lara and Balliang.

== Mountain biking ==
The park has a well-developed network of mountain bike trails, ranging from easy (green) to two downhill tracks for experts (double diamond). The trails are in two areas: Stockyards and Kurrajong Plantation. It is managed by volunteers working with Parks Victoria.

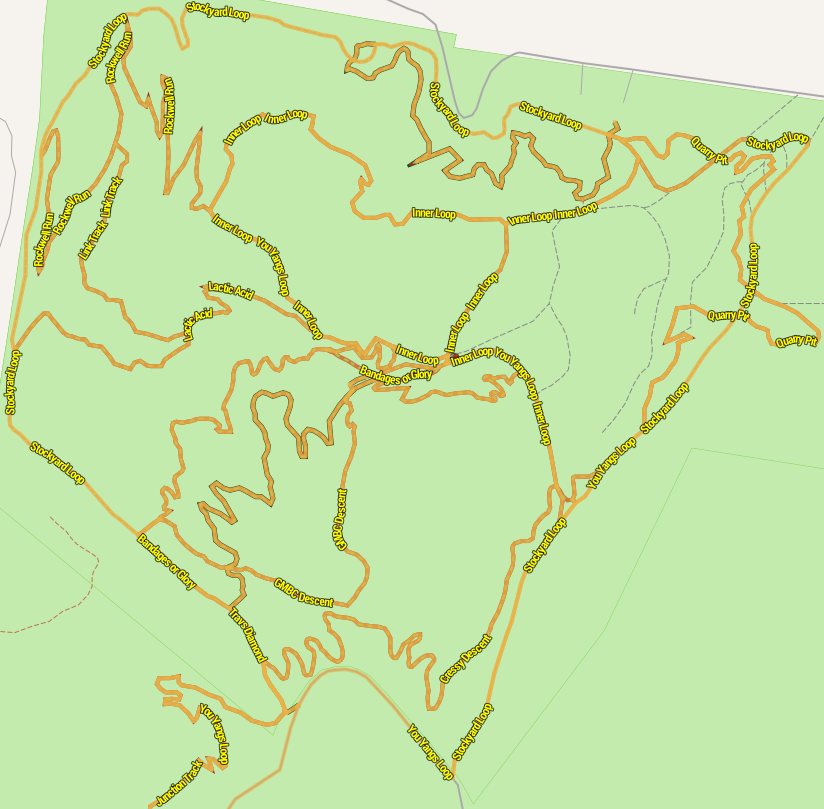
Map of the You Yangs Stockyards mountain biking area.
