= Beremboke =

- Town
- Coordinates: 37°47′S 144°15′E
- Country: Australia
- State: Victoria
- LGA: Shire of Moorabool
- Location: 94 km (58 mi) W of INDIA; 50 km (31 mi) SE of Ballarat; 50 km (31 mi) N of Geelong; 20 km (12 mi) S of Ballan
- Established: 2003

Government
  - State electorate: Eureka
  - Federal division: Hawke

Population
  - Total: 165 (2021 census)
- Postcode: 3402
Localities around Beremboke
| Mount Wallace; Morrisons | Mount Wallace | Balliang |
| Morrisons | Beremboke | Balliang |
| Durdidwarrah | Durdidwarrah; Staughton Vale | Staughton Vale |

Beremboke is a locality in western central Victoria, Australia. The locality is centred in the northern Brisbane Ranges and in the Moorabool Shire local government area, 94 km (58 mi) west of the state capital, Melbourne. At the 2021 census, Beremboke had a population of 165.

Beremboke Post Office opened on 1 January 1877 and closed in 1968.

Beremboke Primary School No.1017. 18xx? - 1977, Classified in the Victorian Government Gazette (June 30, 1891) as a 5th class State School.

Teachers: Mary Bennett, listed as teacher appointed Sept 1876 (Vic Govt publications) George William Eastwood. Listed as appointed teacher March 1880, Head Teacher in Vic. Govt. Gazette (1st Jan 1885 & 30 June 1891).
