= Mount Rothwell Biodiversity Interpretation Centre =

Coordinates: 37°53′22″S 144°26′25″E

- Interactive map of Mount Rothwell Biodiversity Interpretation Centre
- Location: Victoria (Australia)
- Land area: 420 hectares (1,000 acres)

Mount Rothwell Biodiversity Interpretation Centre is the largest feral-predator-free ecosystem in Victoria, Australia. It is located just north of the You Yangs, near the town of Little River.

The fenced 420-hectare site protects a large number of threatened species. It contains native carnivorous marsupials such as the eastern and spotted-tail quoll, the critically endangered southern brush-tailed rock wallaby, and the mainland's largest population of the now extinct (outside of our fences) eastern barred bandicoots.

== History ==
The facility, originally called the "Little River Earth Sanctuary", was established by Earth Sanctuaries Limited, a publicly listed company founded by John Wamsley and his partner Proo Geddes, with conservation as its core role. The company bought a number of properties in South Australia, New South Wales and Victoria to advance Wamsley's idea of creating fully protected habitats for Australian native flora and fauna.

Earth Sanctuaries purchased the 1185-hectare Mount Rothwell property from the Chirnside family in March 2000, due to the presence of a 170-hectare remnant of old-growth grassy woodland. Long-nosed potoroos, southern brown bandicoots, rufous bettongs, red-bellied pademelons, eastern quolls and brush-tailed phascogales were reintroduced into their former habitat. The sanctuary opened to the public on 7 September 2002.

Earth Sanctuaries listed on the stock exchange in 2000, but Wamsley's dream of combining business with conservation quickly ran into financial difficulties. In 2002, Earth Sanctuaries was forced to sell seven of its properties, and in 2005 the company was bought by a private Victorian conservation company, ES Link, for 14 cents a share. The north-west and south-east areas of the original Mount Rothwell holding were sold, as was the historic bluestone homestead.

In November 2006, Prudentia Investments bought ES Link. Prudentia said it regarded the property as an investment in nature and said it would continue to research and breed native animals and native grasslands. The facility was renamed the Mount Rothwell Biodiversity Interpretation Centre.

In 2008, Australian conservationists and entrepreneur Nigel Sharp took over Mount Rothwell and introduced a breeding program for threatened species such as the Eastern Quoll, Eastern barred bandicoot and Southern Brush-tailed Rock-wallaby. In 2016 Sharp established the Odonata Foundation to grow this vision. Odonata has gone on to bring some of Australia's iconic species back from the brink of extinction, and pioneer the 500-in-5 program. While Odonata's work now spans many sites across Australia, Mount Rothwell remains the heart of Odonata's work.
