= Mesoclanis magnipalpis =

Scientific classification
- Kingdom: Animalia
- Phylum: Arthropoda
- Class: Insecta
- Order: Diptera
- Family: Tephritidae
- Subfamily: Tephritinae
- Tribe: Tephritini
- Genus: Mesoclanis
- Species: M. magnipalpis

Binomial name
- Mesoclanis magnipalpis (Bezzi, 1920)

Synonyms
- Ensina magnipalpis Bezzi, 1920; Ensina hieroglyphica Bezzi, 1924

Species of fly

Mesoclanis magnipalpis is a species of tephritid or fruit flies in the genus Mesoclanis of the family Tephritidae.

== Distribution ==
South Africa.
