= Mesoclanis =

Scientific classification
- Kingdom: Animalia
- Phylum: Arthropoda
- Class: Insecta
- Order: Diptera
- Family: Tephritidae
- Subfamily: Tephritinae
- Tribe: Tephritini
- Genus: Mesoclanis; Munro, 1938

Type species
- Trypeta dubia Walker, 1853

Genus of flies

Mesoclanis is a genus of tephritid or fruit flies in the family Tephritidae.

== Species ==
- Mesoclanis bruneata Munro, 1950
- Mesoclanis campiglossina Hering, 1944
- Mesoclanis cribripennis (Bezzi, 1924)
- Mesoclanis dubia (Walker, 1853)
- Mesoclanis hyalineata Munro, 1950
- Mesoclanis magnipalpis (Bezzi, 1920)
- Mesoclanis optanda Munro, 1950
- Mesoclanis ovalis Munro, 1950
- Mesoclanis polana (Munro, 1931)
