= Mesoclanis ovalis =

Scientific classification
- Kingdom: Animalia
- Phylum: Arthropoda
- Class: Insecta
- Order: Diptera
- Family: Tephritidae
- Subfamily: Tephritinae
- Tribe: Tephritini
- Genus: Mesoclanis
- Species: M. ovalis

Binomial name
- Mesoclanis ovalis Munro, 1950

Species of fly

Mesoclanis ovalis is a species of tephritid or fruit flies in the genus Mesoclanis of the family Tephritidae.

== Distribution ==
South Africa.
