= Aboriginal stone arrangement =

Type of rock art

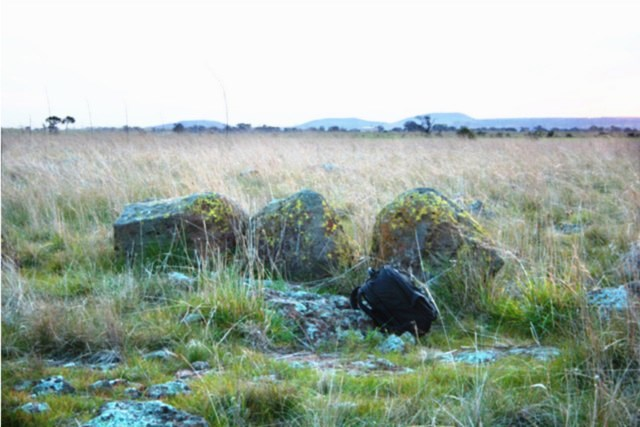
A small part of the Wurdi Youang stone arrangement

Aboriginal stone arrangements are a form of rock art constructed by Aboriginal Australians. Typically, they consist of stones, each of which may be about 30 centimetres (12 in) in size, laid out in a pattern extending over several metres or tens of metres. Notable examples have been made by many different Australian Aboriginal cultures, and in many cases are thought to be associated with spiritual ceremonies.

Particularly fine examples are in Victoria, where the stones can be very large (up to 1 metre (3 ft 3 in) high). For example, the stone arrangement at Wurdi Youang consists of about 100 stones arranged in an egg-shaped oval about 50 metres (160 ft) across. Each stone is well-embedded into the soil, and many have "trigger-stones" to support them. The appearance of the site is very similar to that of the megalithic stone circles found throughout Britain (although the function and culture are presumably completely different). Although its association with Aboriginal Australians is well-authenticated and beyond doubt, the purpose is unclear, although it may have a connection with initiation rites. It has also been suggested that the site may have been used for astronomical purposes (Morieson 2003). Other well-known examples in Victoria include the stone arrangements at Carisbrook and Lake Bolac.

At Murujuga in Western Australia, there are many forms of ancient rock art, including petroglyphs and tall standing stones. Some of them are thalu sites (literally "totem" in the Ngarluma language; refers to ceremonial sites), and important for the regeneration of key species. One significant sacred site includes 96 standing stones, and is said to be the largest concentration of standing stones in one area in Australia.

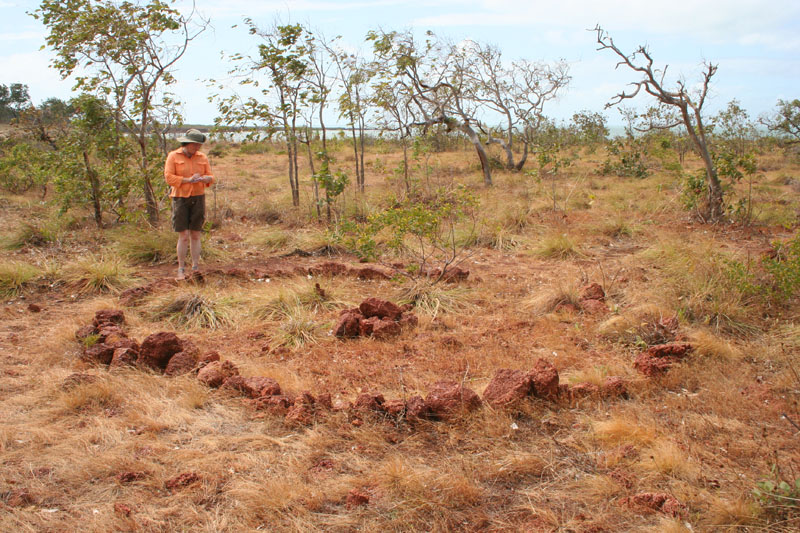
Part of the Yirrkala stone arrangement representing a Macassan fishing boat

A very different example is found near Yirrkala in Arnhem Land, where there are detailed images of the praus used by Macassan fishermen fishing for Trepang, several hundred years before European contact. Here the stones are small (typically 10 centimetres (3.9 in) to 20 centimetres (7.9 in)), sit on the surface of the ground, and can easily be moved by hand, which also implies that they can be easily damaged or altered by modern hands, so that caution is needed when interpreting such sites. Similar examples are found scattered throughout Australia, mainly in remote or inaccessible places, and it is likely that there were many more prior to European settlement of Australia.

In south-east Australia are the Bora rings, which consist of two circles of stones, one larger than the other, which were used in an initiation ceremony and rite of passage in which boys were transformed into men.

Some Aboriginal stone arrangements in south-east Australia are aligned to cardinal directions with an accuracy of a few degrees, while the Wurdi Youang stone arrangement, which indicates the direction of solstitial sunsets, appears to have been built around the east-west direction, again with an accuracy of a few degrees. This requirement for highly accurate direction is also indicated by the practice of orienting the graves of deceased Kamilaroi men to an accuracy of a few degrees.

== See also ==
- Indigenous Australian art
- Aboriginal Astronomy
- Archaeoastronomy
