= Lake Bolac stone arrangement =

Aboriginal heritage site in Victoria, Australia

- Kuyang stone arrangement
- Interactive map of Lake Bolac stone arrangement
- 37°42′25″S 142°51′05″E
- Type: Aboriginal stone arrangement
- Cultures: Wada wurrung, Girai wurrung and Djab wurrung clans

History
- Built: c.1500 BCE
- Built by: Australian Aboriginal
- Event: Gathering place to celebrate the life cycle of eels

Site notes
- Material: Basalt stones
- Length: 176 metres (577 ft)
- Volume: Stone sizes vary from about 30cm to 150cm
- Condition: Partially Destroyed
- Owner: Private land
- Management: The Eastern Maar Aboriginal Corporation
- Public access: No

Designations
- Designation: Aboriginal sacred site

The Lake Bolac stone arrangement, also known as the Kuyang stone arrangement, is an Aboriginal ceremonial site near the town of Lake Bolac in the Western District, north-east of Hamilton, Victoria, Australia. It is one of several Aboriginal stone arrangements scattered across Australia. It was registered on the Victorian Aboriginal Heritage Register in 1975, and is protected by the Victorian Aboriginal Heritage Act 2006.

The basalt stones are arranged in two lines and are said to resemble a giant eel. The stones vary in size from about 30 centimetres (12 in) to 150 centimetres (59 in), with some possibly having been embedded in holes in the ground so as to make them stand upright.

The Lake Bolac ceremonial site, and the similar Wurdi Youang site, were identified as being Aboriginal structures on the basis that there was "no counterpart among colonial structures and there was no evidence that they ever formed part of any type of fence or building". Both arrangements are on land that had been owned by a single European Australian family since first settlement, and there existed no tradition within those families of the arrangements having been built by Europeans. Massola utilised similar criteria to identify the Mount Franklin stone arrangement as a potential Aboriginal stone alignment.

The importance of eels to the Aboriginal economy was recognised early in the site's history: "Lake Boloke is the most celebrated place in the Western District for the fine quality and abundance of its eels, and, when the autumn rains induce these fish to leave the lake and to go down the river to the sea, the Aborigines gather there from great distances".

At some stage, some of the stones were removed to make way for a road (now the Glenelg Highway to Adelaide). In April 2021 the stone arrangement, which is on privately owned land, was found to have been damaged. The Eastern Maar Aboriginal Corporation, after viewing the site from the road, said that up to 60 metres (200 ft) of the stone arrangement may have been destroyed.

The Lake Bolac Eel Festival is a community music and art festival held each autumn on the foreshore of Lake Bolac since 2004, inspired by the fact that Lake Bolac was a traditional gathering place for Indigenous people before white settlement. This festival has helped to make the site well known to both Aboriginal and non-Aboriginal people.
