= Mesoclanis dubia =

Scientific classification
- Kingdom: Animalia
- Phylum: Arthropoda
- Class: Insecta
- Order: Diptera
- Family: Tephritidae
- Subfamily: Tephritinae
- Tribe: Tephritini
- Genus: Mesoclanis
- Species: M. dubia

Binomial name
- Mesoclanis dubia Walker, 1853

Synonyms
- Trypeta dubia Walker, 1853

Species of fly

Mesoclanis dubia is a species of tephritid or fruit flies in the genus Mesoclanis of the family Tephritidae. This species can be found in South Africa.
