= You Yangs =

Mountain in Victoria, Australia

You Yangs (Wurdi Youang)
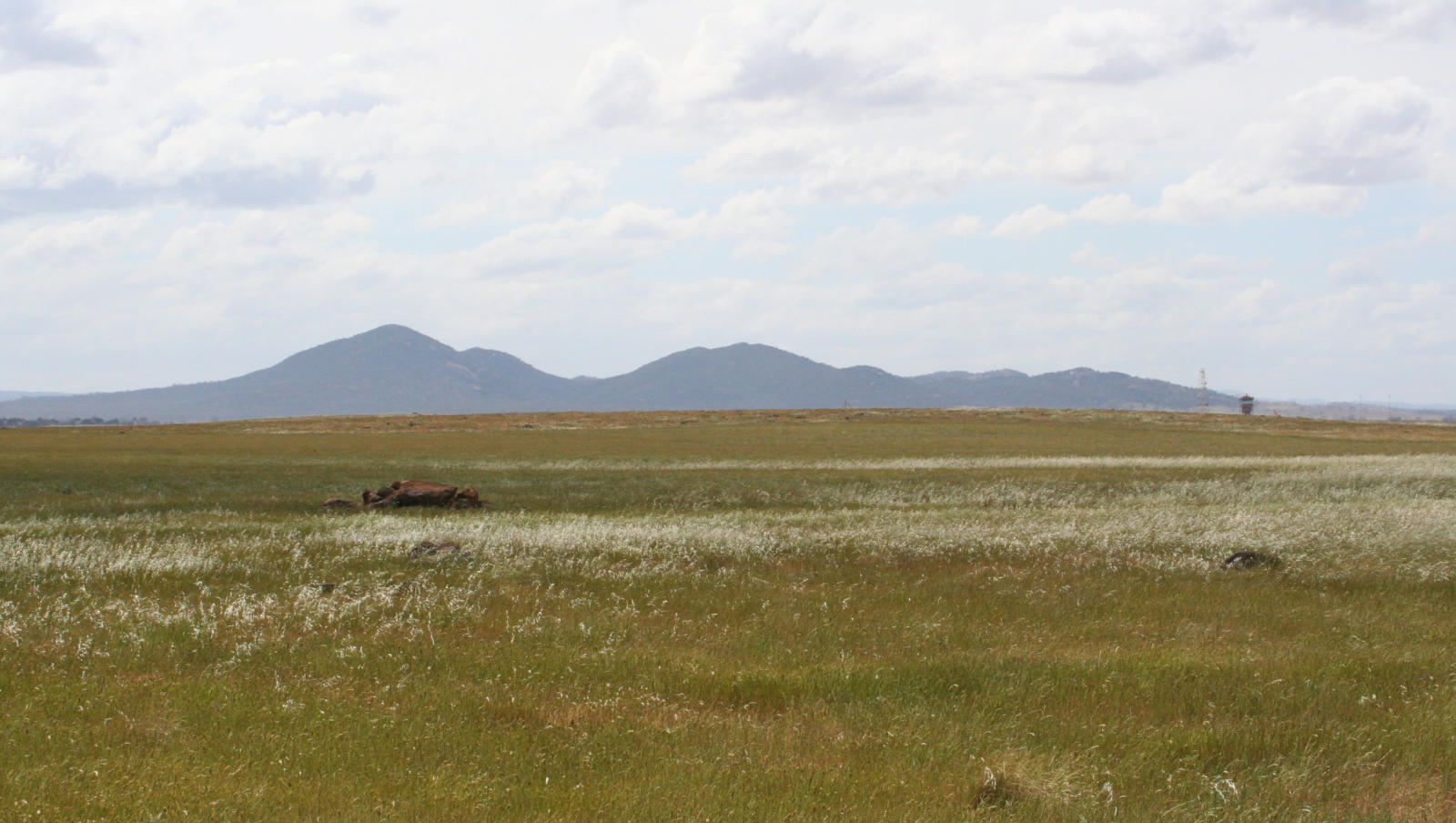
- The You Yangs viewed from the south, with Avalon Airport in the foreground

Highest point
- Peak: Flinders Peak
- Elevation: 343 m (1,125 ft)

Dimensions
- Length: 24 km (15 mi)

Geography
- Country: Australia
- State: Victoria
- Range coordinates: 37°57′S 144°26′E

Geology
- Rock age: Devonian
- Rock types: Igneous; Sedimentary; Metamorphic

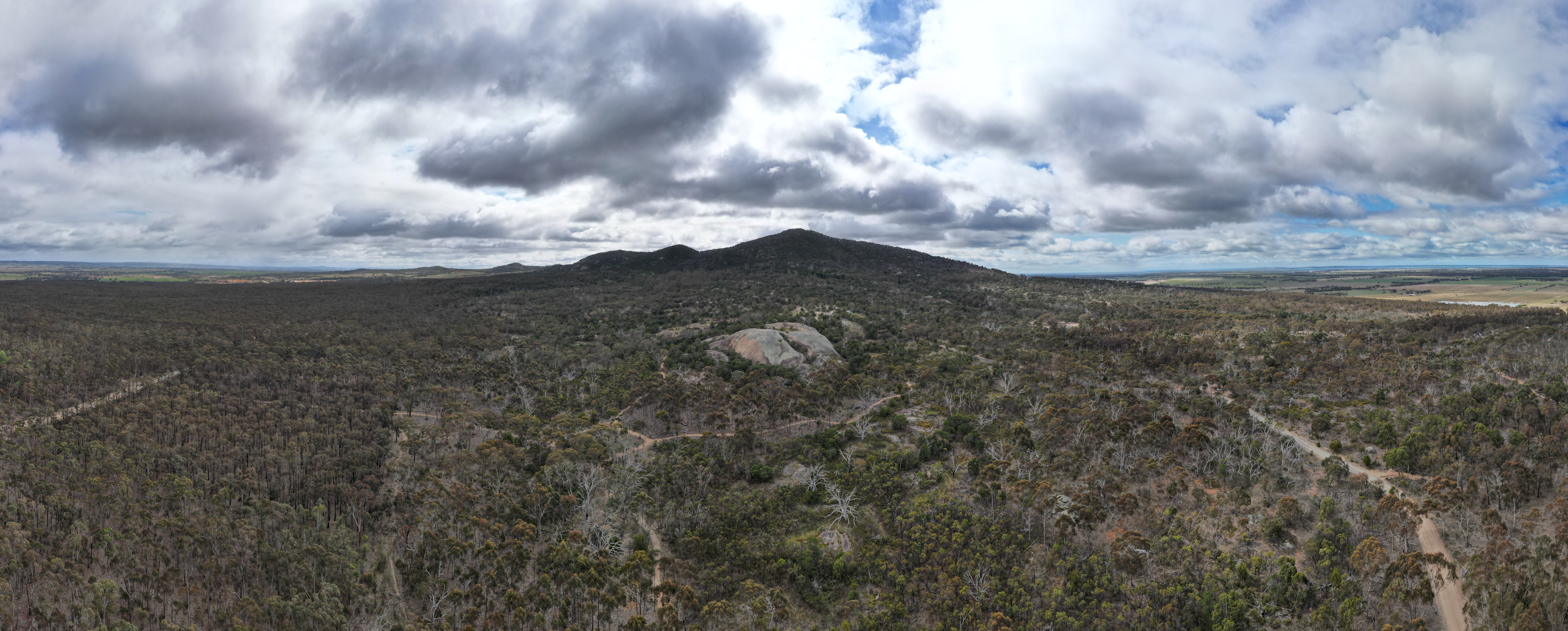
You Yangs panorama, Spring 2024

The You Yangs are a series of granite ridges that rise up to 343 m (1,125 ft) above the flat and low-lying Werribee Plain in southern Victoria, Australia, approximately 5 km (3.1 mi) due west of the rural town of Little River, 55 km (34 mi) southwest of Melbourne CBD and 22 km (14 mi) north of Geelong. The main ridge runs roughly north-south for about 9 km (5 mi), with a lower extension running for about 15 km (10 mi) to the west. Much of the southern section of the range is protected in You Yangs Regional Park.

The You Yangs sits about halfway between the Brisbane Ranges to the west and the nearest coast, at Corio Bay to the south-east. Although its highest point, Flinders Peak at the southern end, is only 343 m, the You Yangs dominate the surrounding landscape and are clearly identifiable from nearby Geelong, Melbourne and beyond.

The You Yangs are the site of a geoglyph of Bunjil, a Dreamtime creator deity to some of the Indigenous people of Victoria, depicted as an wedge-tailed eagle. The geoglyph was constructed by the Australian artist Andrew Rogers in recognition of the local Indigenous Wathaurong people. Unveiled in March 2006, the geoglyph has a wing span of 100 metres and 1500 tonnes of rock was used in its construction.

== History ==
The name "You Yang" comes from the Aboriginal words Wurdi Youang or Ude Youang which could have any number of meanings from "big mountain in the middle of a plain", "big or large hill", or "bald". The Woiwurrung word for granite stone 'yow wong' is also a possibility. The Yawangi people enlarged natural hollows in the rocks to form wells that held water even in dry seasons. The area around the You Yangs was called Morong-morongoo after the murnong, or yam daisy, that was abundant there.

Explorer Matthew Flinders was the first European to visit the You Yangs. On 1 May 1802, he and three of his men climbed to the highest point. He named it "Station Peak" but the name was changed in 1912 to "Flinders Peak" in his honour.

The You Yangs have always had artists to paint them especially in works by one of Australia's greatest artists, Fred Williams. Williams spent long periods developing his plein air representations of the You Yangs.

They have been used as a setting for filming, such as in scenes from the HBO World War II series The Pacific, and The Dressmaker.

== Geography ==
The nearest settlements include;

- Balliang - 5 km northwest
- Little River - 5 km east
- Lara - 7 km south
- Geelong - 31.5 km south
- Werribee - 37.5 km east

Two watercourses pass through or by the ranges: Hovells Creek originates in the western parts of the ranges, while Little River flows around the ranges to the north and east.

== Geology ==
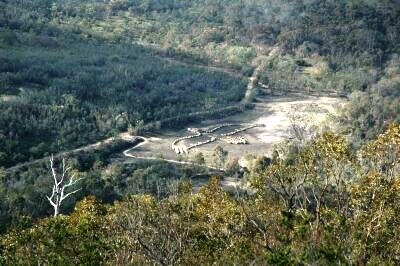
View of the Bunjil geoglyph from Flinders Peak

Contrary to popular belief, the You Yangs are not the remains of a volcano. They are an inselberg or monadnock, and the granite that forms them was originally a mass of magma that had worked its way up into the surrounding sedimentary rocks during the Devonian period, when the land surface in Victoria was several kilometres higher than today.

The magma crystallised before it reached the surface, so it did not produce any volcanic activity. Instead, a very slow cooling rate allowed many large white crystals of feldspar to form. These can be seen in many of the granite outcrops throughout the ranges. In places the crystals appear to be lined up, probably because the gooey magma was still moving around when they were growing. The rock enclosing the big feldspar crystals mainly contains crystals of greyish quartz and two black minerals (hornblende and a variety of mica known as biotite).

There are also some tiny crystals of two minerals, allanite and titanite, that contain radioactive elements such as uranium and thorium. Titanite crystals have been used to calculate that the You Yangs granite solidified 365 million years ago. In many places in the granite there are dark grey clots and lumps. These are called xenoliths and are foreign pieces of sedimentary rock that have been incorporated into the magma as it moved to the location at which it solidified.

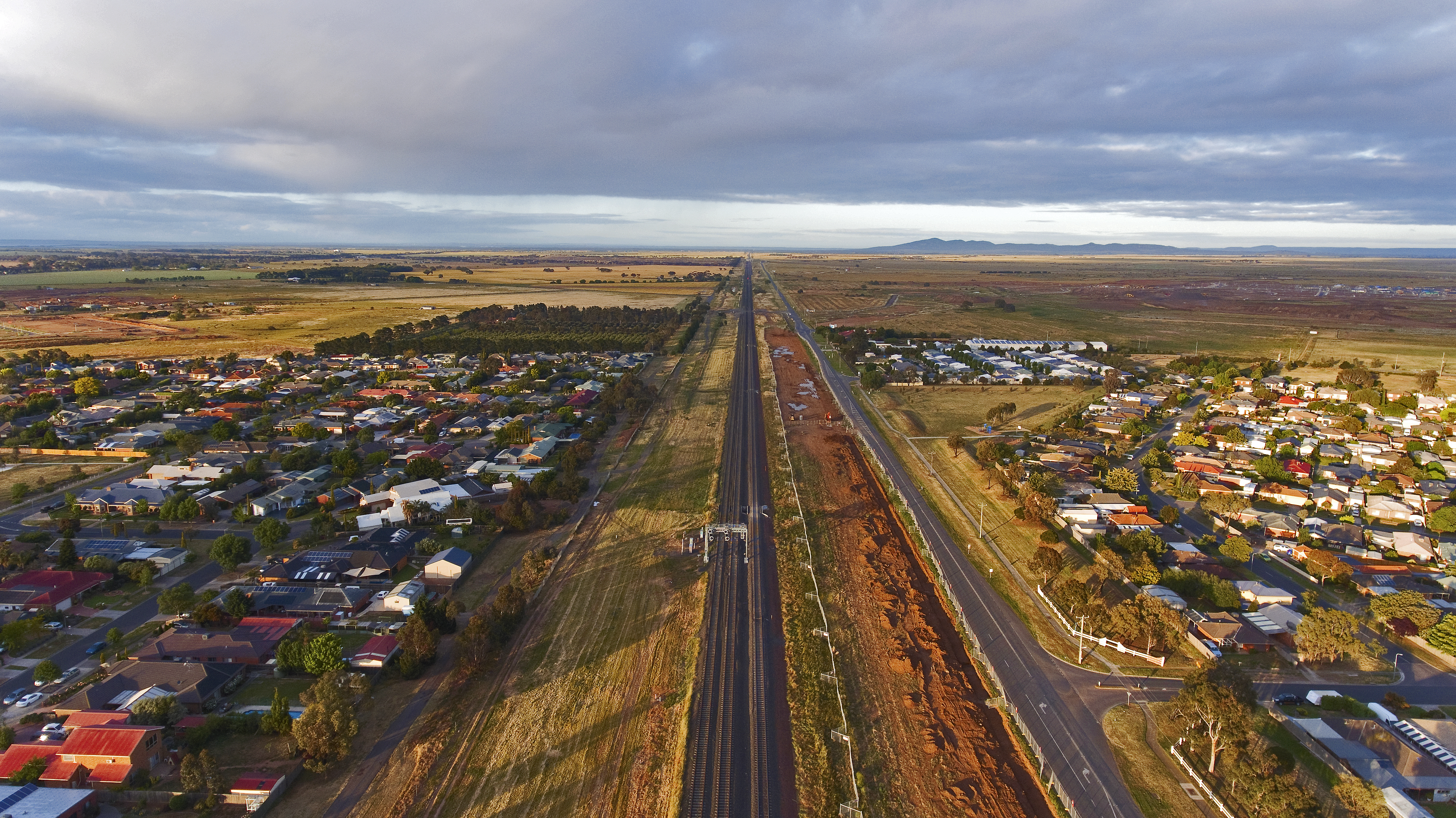
The You Yangs as seen from Werribee Racecourse, 2017

The land surface has eroded over the millions of years since the granite solidified, leaving it exposed. Because granite is a hard rock, it has resisted erosion better than the rocks that surrounded it. The size and shape of the rounded tors are controlled by fractures in the granite that resulted from slight shrinkage during cooling. Weathering and erosion of the granite has formed a blanket of sandy soil that covers any contacts with surrounding rocks.

== Climate, vegetation and wildlife ==
Owing to the rain shadow created by the Otway Ranges to the south-west, the You Yangs are in the driest part of Victoria south of the Great Dividing Range. Annual rainfall is as little as 450 millimetres (18 in), with the result that the natural vegetation is grassland or low woodland rather than forest.

River red gum (Eucalyptus camaldulensis) is the dominant native tree on the low slopes and gullies, yellow gum (E. leucoxylon) grows widely throughout the low and middle slopes, and blue gum (E. pseudoglobulus) grows on the rugged upper slopes. Other native trees in the park include red box (E. polyanthemos), grey box (E. microcarpa) & yellow box (E. melliodora), manna gum (E. viminalis), red ironbark (E. tricarpa), cherry ballart (Exocarpos cupressiformis), and silver and black wattle (Acacia dealbata and A.mearnsii). Native low vegetation is sparse and dominated by grasses and saltbushes, with some scrubby areas of snowy mintbush (Prostanthera nivea) and drooping cassinia (Cassinia arcuata).

Many introduced plants occur in the You Yangs, some planted deliberately for forestry, including sugar gum (E. cladocalyx), swamp yate (E. occidentalis) and brown mallet (E. astringens), and others that have been introduced accidentally or have invaded the area, for example, boneseed (Chyrsanthemoides monilifera) and bridal creeper (Asparagus asparagoides).

The You Yangs are home to more than 200 bird species such as tawny frogmouths, white-naped, white-plumed, New Holland and brown-headed honeyeaters, kookaburras, white-winged choughs, crested shriketits, eastern rosellas, crimson rosellas, purple-crowned lorikeets, sulphur-crested cockatoos, eastern yellow robins, jacky winters and scarlet robins.

Mammals living in the park include eastern grey kangaroos, echidnas, swamp wallabies, sugar gliders, brushtail and ringtail possums, and koalas.

Koalas in the You Yangs have been studied since 2006. In approximately 28% of the Park they are monitored by a non-intrusive system of nose pattern identification. The entire population was considered to number around 105 in 2017, down 35% from estimated 161 in 2007. The population has been recorded to prefer to roost in river red gum (Eucalyptus camaldulensis): 34% of sightings occur in that species. Four generations of one koala family have been recorded.

The nearby Serendip Sanctuary, a Victorian government wildlife research centre, open to the public, has been involved in breeding endangered Victorian wildlife species, such as the Australian bustard and the brolga (Antigone rubicundus).

== Outdoor activities ==
The foothills to the north of the peaks are home to Ford Australia's You Yangs Proving Ground and the Sporting Shooters' Association of Australia's Eagle Park shooting range. There is also a paintball facility next to the SSAA range that is open to both adults and young people.

Camping is not permitted in the You Yangs, although picnics are allowed. Hiking is popular, and the Mountain to Mouth (M~M) event was a bi-annual two-day 80 km (50 mi) art walk starting from the You Yangs and heading for the Barwon River mouth in Geelong, celebrating the contemporary song lines of the Wadawurrung people and recognising their land and traditions. Autumn and winter are also considered the perfect mountain biking and horse riding conditions, because the increased rainfall makes the trails less dusty and the soil firmer, making it more suitable for riding.

The You Yangs is home to a free 5 km parkrun event. You Yangs parkrun starts at 8am every Saturday near the Kurrajong Plantation car park. Permanent signage marks the 5 km loop course for use at any time.

== See also ==
- List of mountains in Australia § Victoria
