= Fairy Park =

Amusement park in Victoria, Australia

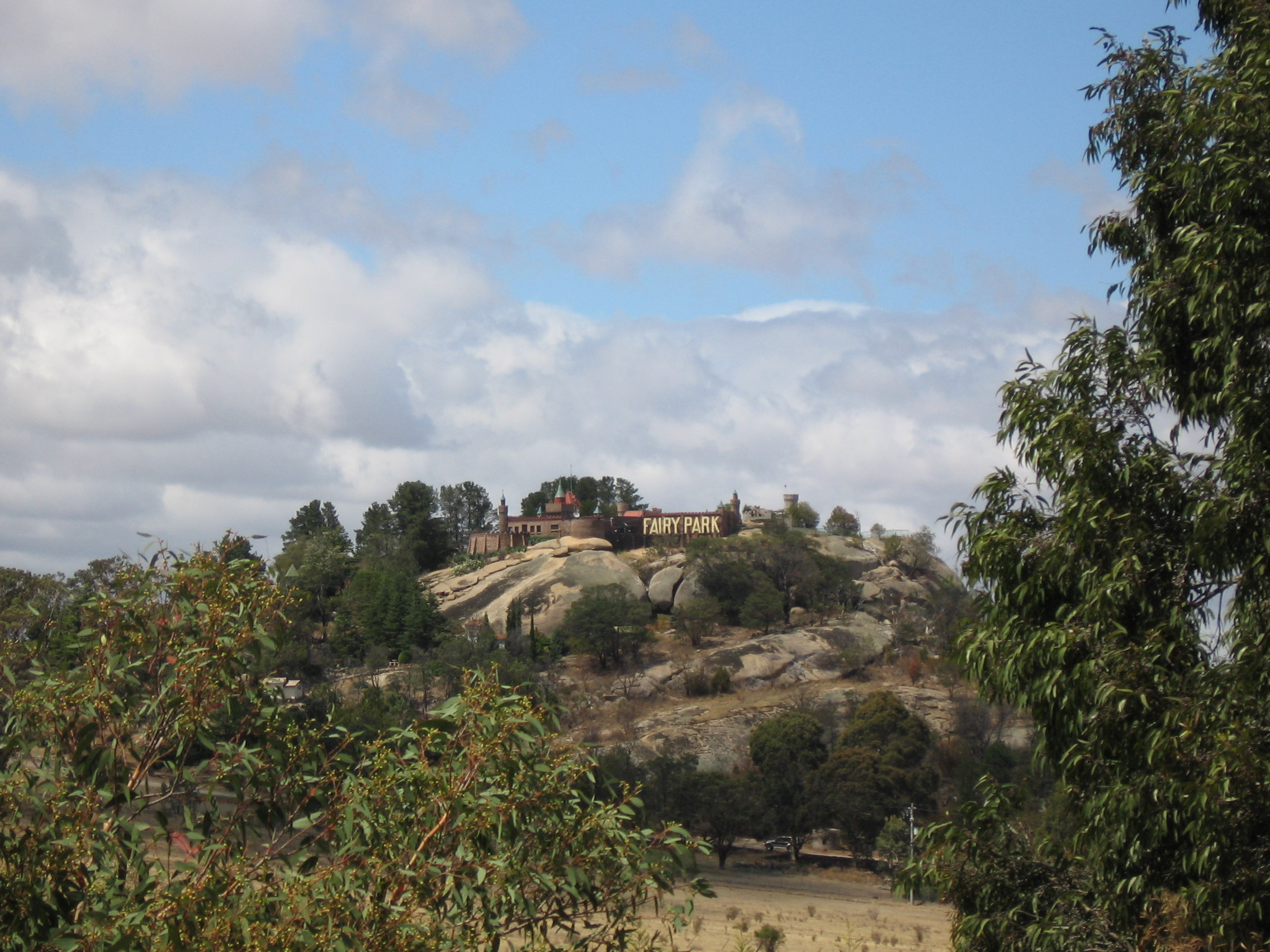
- Fairy Park
- Interactive map of Fairy Park
- Location: Anakie, Victoria, Australia
- Coordinates: 37°53′30″S 144°15′35″E
- Opened: December 1959
- Website: www.fairypark.com

Fairy Park (also known as the Fairytale Park or the Fairytale Theme Park) is an amusement park located at Anakie, one hour west from Melbourne and 30 minutes from Geelong, in Victoria, Australia.

== History ==
Opening in December 1959, the park was the idea of Peter Mayer, a German immigrant to the country. The Mayer family created many of the original displays by hand before purchasing the land in Anakie and opening the park. The Mayer family still owns and operates the park to this day.

Fairy Park celebrated its 50th birthday in 2009.

== Attractions ==
- 22 Hand Crafted Animated Scenes, including Cinderella, Jack and the Beanstalk, and Goldilocks
- Model Train display
- 360° summit views from Elephant Rock at the top of Mt Anakie
- Camelot Playground
