= Maude, Victoria =

Maude Victoria
- Coordinates: 37°57′0″S 144°10′0″E
- Population: 211 (SAL 2021)
- Postcode(s): 3331
- Location: 92 km (57 mi) SW of Melbourne; 30 km (19 mi) NW of Geelong; 7 km (4 mi) E of Lethbridge
- LGA(s): Golden Plains Shire
- State electorate(s): Eureka
- Federal division(s): Corio; Ballarat
Localities around Maude:
She Oaks	Steiglitz	Anakie
Lethbridge	Maude	Anakie
Russells Bridge	Sutherlands Creek	Anakie

Maude is a locality near Geelong, Victoria, Australia 92 kilometres (57 mi) southwest of Melbourne in the Golden Plains Shire. At the 2016 census, Maude had a population of 223.

Maude Post Office opened on 1 August 1862 and closed in 1951.

Bunjil's Lookout in Maude, opened in 2015, provides views over the Moorabool River valley to the west of the township.
