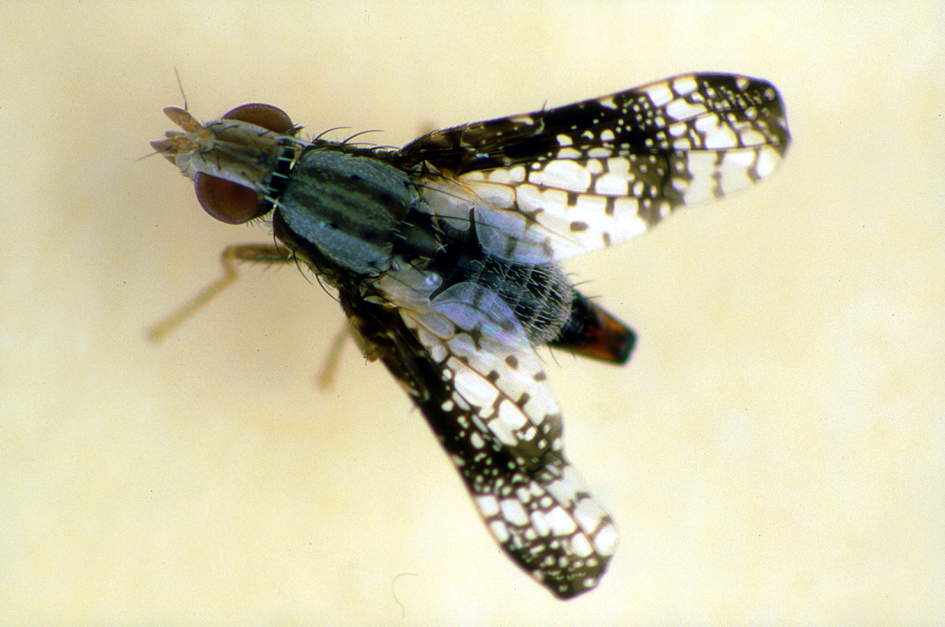

Scientific classification
- Kingdom: Animalia
- Phylum: Arthropoda
- Class: Insecta
- Order: Diptera
- Family: Tephritidae
- Subfamily: Tephritinae
- Tribe: Tephritini
- Genus: Mesoclanis
- Species: M. polana

Binomial name
- Mesoclanis polana (Munro, 1931)

Synonyms
- Ensina polana Munro, 1931

= Mesoclanis polana =

Species of fly

Mesoclanis polana is a species of tephritid or fruit flies in the genus Mesoclanis of the family Tephritidae.

== Distribution ==
Mozambique, South Africa.
