= Anakie, Victoria =

Town in Victoria, Australia

Anakie
- Town
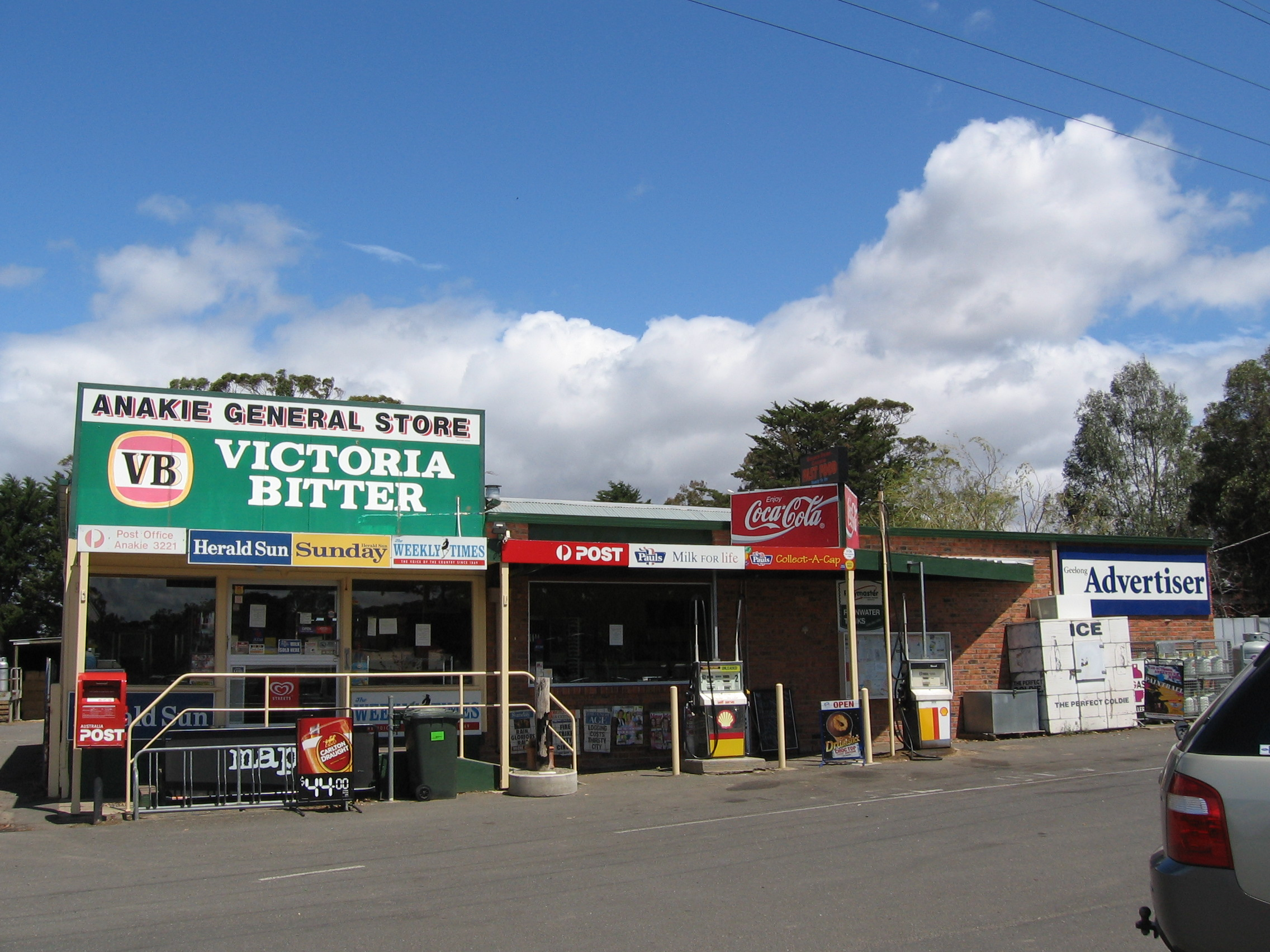
- The general store at Anakie

- Coordinates: 37°55′S 144°15′E
- Country: Australia
- State: Victoria
- LGAs: City of Greater Geelong; Golden Plains Shire
- Location: 73 km (45 mi) SW of Melbourne; 20 km (12 mi) N of Geelong; 12 km (7.5 mi) W of Lara

Government
  - State electorate: Lara
  - Federal divisions: Ballarat; Corio

Population
  - Total: 734 (2021 census)
- Postcode: 3213
Localities around Anakie
Steiglitz	Staughton Vale	Balliang
Steiglitz	Anakie	Little River
Maude	Moorabool; Lovely Banks	Lara

Anakie (/ˈænəkiː/ AN-uh-kee) is a town between Geelong and Bacchus Marsh, in Victoria, Australia. At the 2021 census, Anakie and the surrounding area had a population of 734. The area is divided between the City of Greater Geelong and Golden Plains Shire local government areas.

The name is believed to be derived from 'Anakie Youang', an expression in one of the local Australian Aboriginal languages, meaning 'little hill' or 'twin hills'. The nearby Brisbane Ranges National Park contains three hills known as The Anakies, as well as Mount Anakie.

Anakie's industry consists mainly of farms and vineyards. Fairy Park, a fairytale-themed amusement park overlooking the Anakie township, is a prominent local attraction. The town is also a stopping-off point for the Brisbane Ranges National Park.

The town has an Australian rules football team, the Anakie Football Club, competing in the Geelong & District Football League.

== History ==
The area was first settled by Europeans in 1842 when Frederick Griffin established his Anakie pastoral run. In the 1850s, Griffin subdivided some of the land along the Anakie Creek, which became a small village. A Wesleyan school opened in 1858 and a Catholic school in 1859. The Post Office opened on 15 October 1858. By 1865, the town had a hotel and a Presbyterian church. A Catholic church was established in 1871, followed by an Anglican church in 1891. The size of the farming lots were too small for most farmers to make a living, and so consolidations occurred, which resulted in a drop in population.

Residents in Anakie experienced severe bushfires on 22 January 2006, with fires spreading over 67 square kilometres (26 sq mi) of land and at least three homes being lost in conditions surpassing 42 °C (108 °F).

Narada Homestead dates from 1862 and is listed on the Victorian Heritage Register.

== Population ==
In the 2021 census, there were 734 people in Anakie. Seventy-nine per cent of people were born in Australia and 88% of people spoke only English at home. The most common responses for religion were 'no religion' (44.8%) and Catholic (17.7%).

== Gallery ==
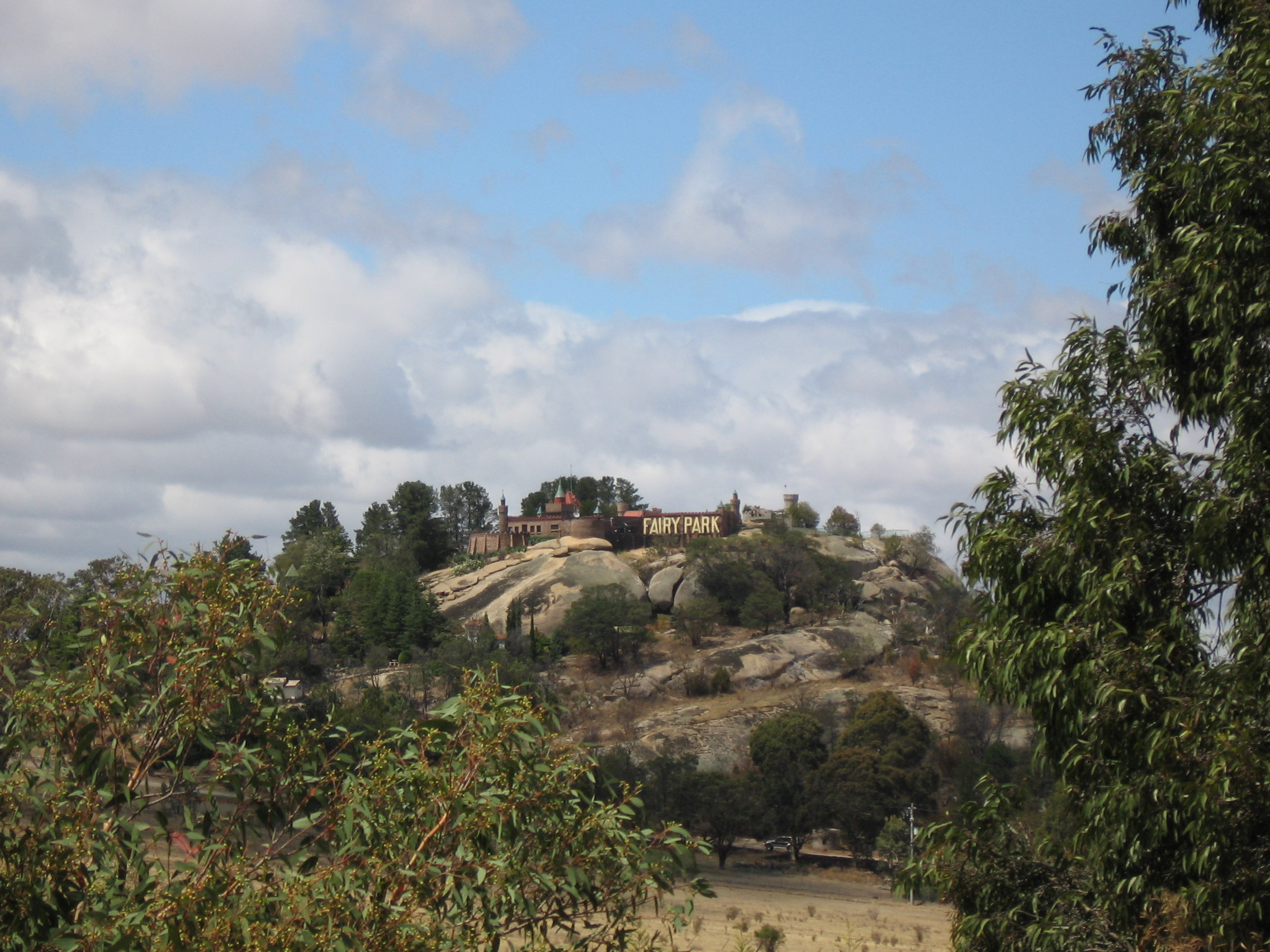
Fairy Park, a small amusement park in Anakie
