= Wurdi Youang =

Aboriginal stone arrangement in Victoria, Australia

Coordinates: 37°52′30″S 144°27′28″E

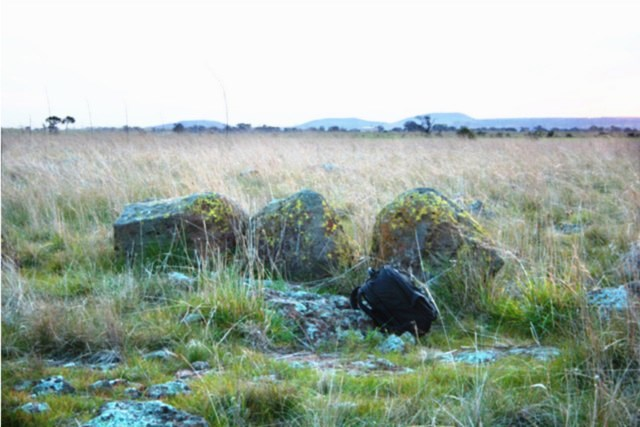
A small part of the Wurdi Youang stone arrangement

A survey of the arrangement showing the solar alignments contained within

Wurdi Youang is the name attributed to an Aboriginal stone arrangement located off the Little River – Ripley Road at Mount Rothwell, near Little River, Victoria in Australia. The site was acquired by the Indigenous Land Corporation on 14 January 2000 and transferred to the Wathaurong Aboriginal Co-operative on 17 August 2006.

== Description ==
The stone arrangement takes the form of an irregular egg-shape or ovoid about 50 m (164 ft) in diameter with its major axis aligning east-west. It is composed of about 100 basalt stones, ranging from small rocks about 200 mm (8 in) in diameter to standing stones about 1 m (3 ft) high with an estimated total mass of about 23 t (23 long tons). There are three prominent waist-high stones, at its western end, which is the highest point of the ring. The purpose, use, and age of the arrangement are not known. The purpose of the site may be ceremonial in nature as with many other stone arrangements in southeastern Australia.

The site is recorded on the Victorian Aboriginal Heritage Register, the Victorian Heritage Register (H1107), and the City of Greater Geelong Planning Scheme Heritage Overlay (HO294).

The name Wurdi Youang in the Wadawurrung language means "the big hill", which is the pre-colonial name of what is now called Station Peak or Flinders Peak – the tallest of the You Yangs. During the late 19th and early 20th century, the region between the You Yangs, the town of Little River, and the Little River itself were known as the Parish of Wurdi Youang in the County of Grant. The site is registered in Victoria under the name "Mount Rothwell Stone Arrangement".

== Astronomical hypothesis ==
A series of stones, located to the west of the arrangement's western apex, mark the positions of the setting sun at the equinoxes and solstices. A survey study shows that these alignments are accurate to within a few degrees. Additionally, the straight sides of the arrangement, which diverge from its eastern apex, also indicate the setting position of the sun at the solstices to within a few degrees. At the equinoxes, the sun sets over the three prominent stones at its apex.

It has been suggested by scientists studying the arrangements that it could be as old as 11,000 years (based on carbon dating at nearby sites), which could make it the oldest astronomical observatory in the world. However, the precise age of the arrangement remains unknown.
