= Balliang =

Balliang Victoria
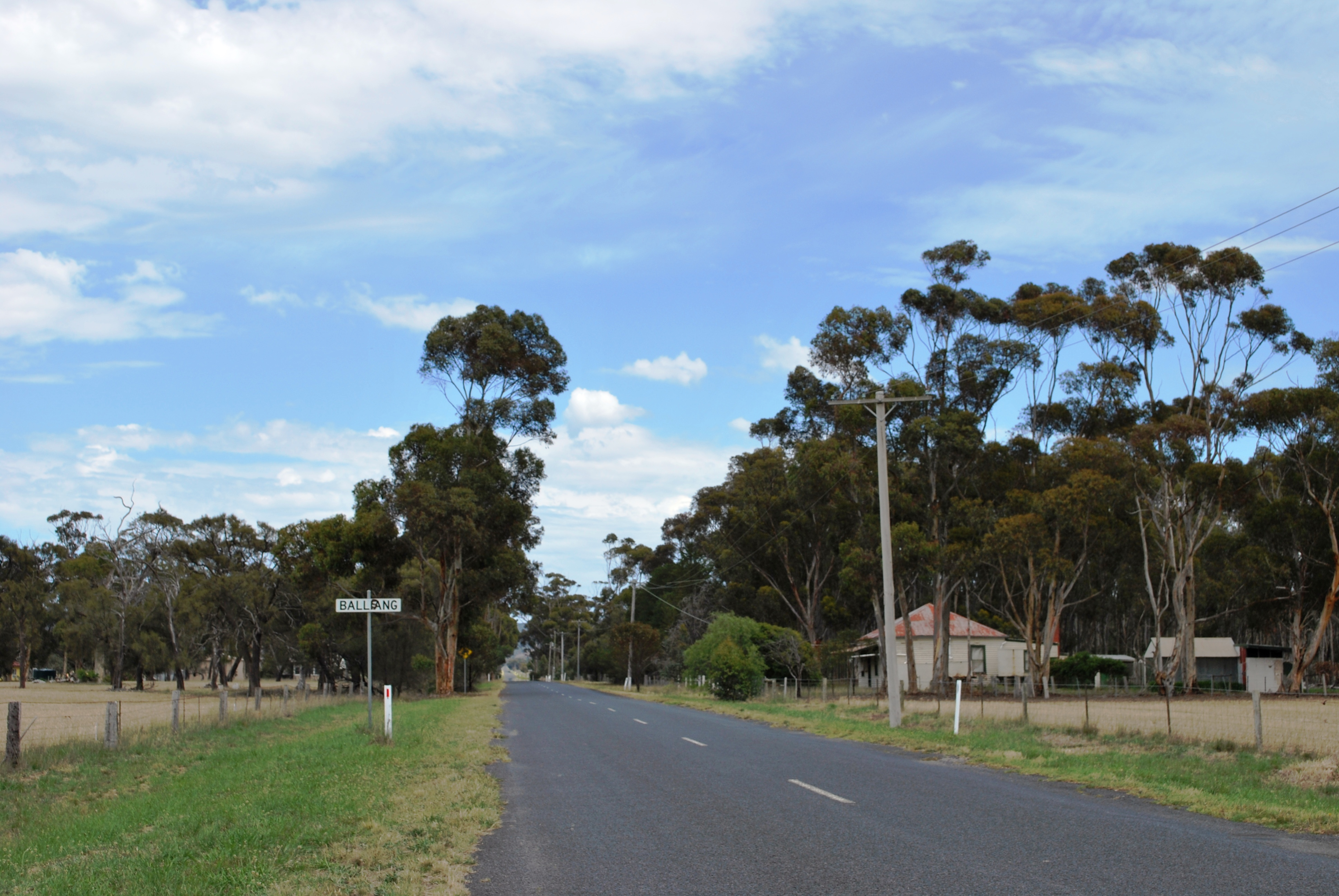
- Balliang

- Coordinates: 37°50′0″S 144°22′0″E
- Population: 254 (2021 census)
- Postcode(s): 3340
- Location: 71 km (44 mi) W of Melbourne; 39 km (24 mi) N of Geelong; 24 km (15 mi) S of Bacchus Marsh
- LGA(s): Shire of Moorabool; City of Greater Geelong
- State electorate(s): Lara; Eureka
- Federal division(s): Corio; Hawke
Localities around Balliang:
Mount Wallace	Glenmore; Rowsley	Parwan
Beremboke; Staughton Vale	Balliang	Balliang East
Anakie	Anakie	Little River

Balliang is a locality in Victoria, Australia. It is divided between the Shire of Moorabool and City of Greater Geelong local government areas. It lies north of Geelong and 54 kilometres (34 mi) from the state capital, Melbourne. At the 2021 census, Balliang had a population of 254.

== History ==
The locality was named for a house in Geelong owned by Foster Fyans, which was in turn named for Balliang (or Ballyang), who was an Aboriginal leader employed by Fyans. Balliang Post Office opened on 23 June 1910 and closed in 1968.

== Demographics ==
As of the 2016 Australian census, 290 people resided in Balliang. The median age of persons in Balliang was 42 years. There were more females than males, with 52.7% of the population female and 47.3% male. The average household size was 2.9 people per household.

75.5% of Balliang residents were born in Australia. 8.3% of Balliang residents identify as Aboriginal or Torres Strait Islanders. The predominant ancestry in Balliang is English, with 29.3% of residents identifying as such. 28.5% of people in Balliang identify as Australian, as well as 15.5% who identify as Irish, 7.7% who identify as Scottish, and 3.9% who identify as German. 86.2% of households speak only English at home, with the remaining 2.5% speaking Maltese.

== Industry ==
The predominant industry in Balliang is "other grain growing", with 11.2% of employed residents working in that industry.

== Gallery ==
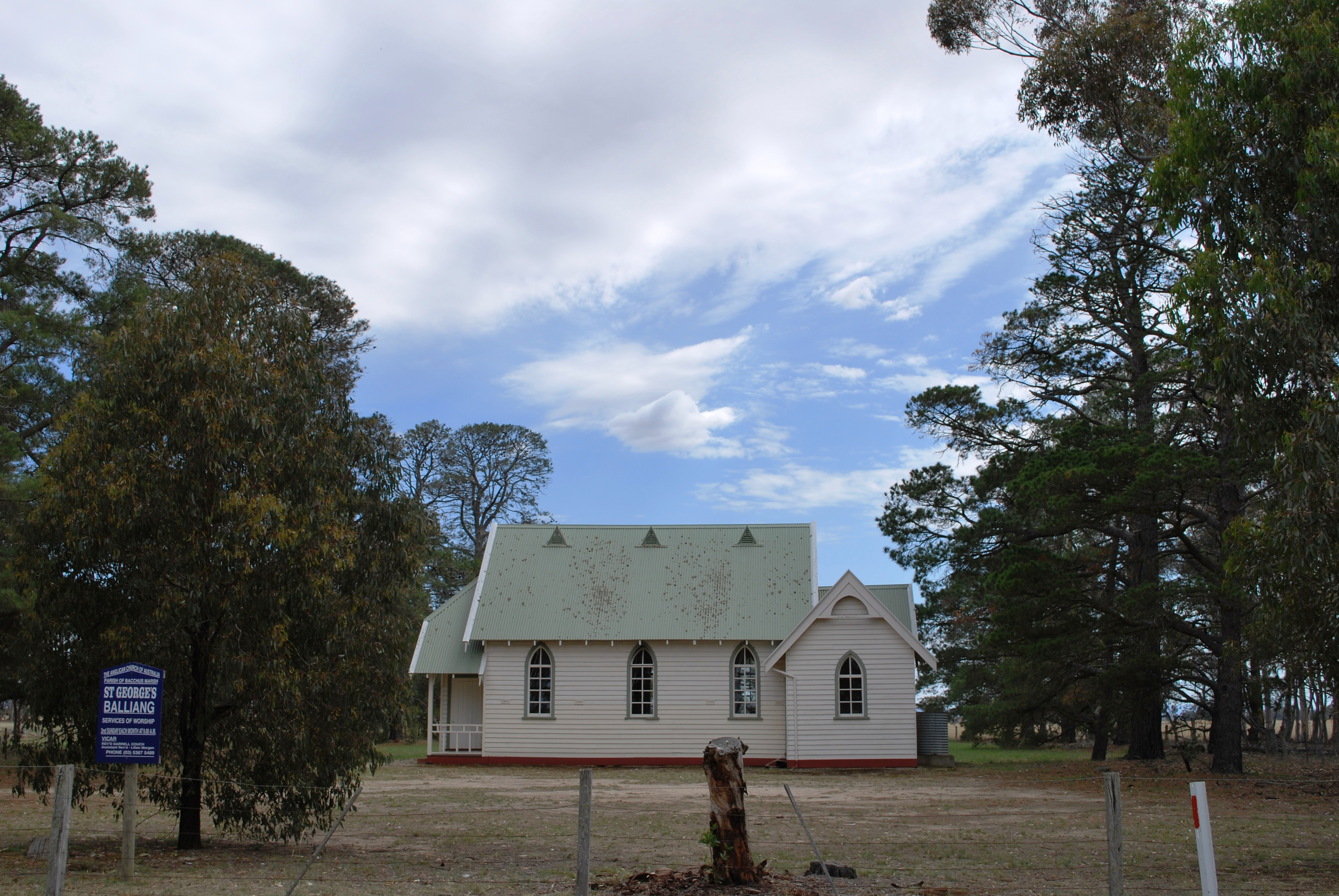
Anglican Church

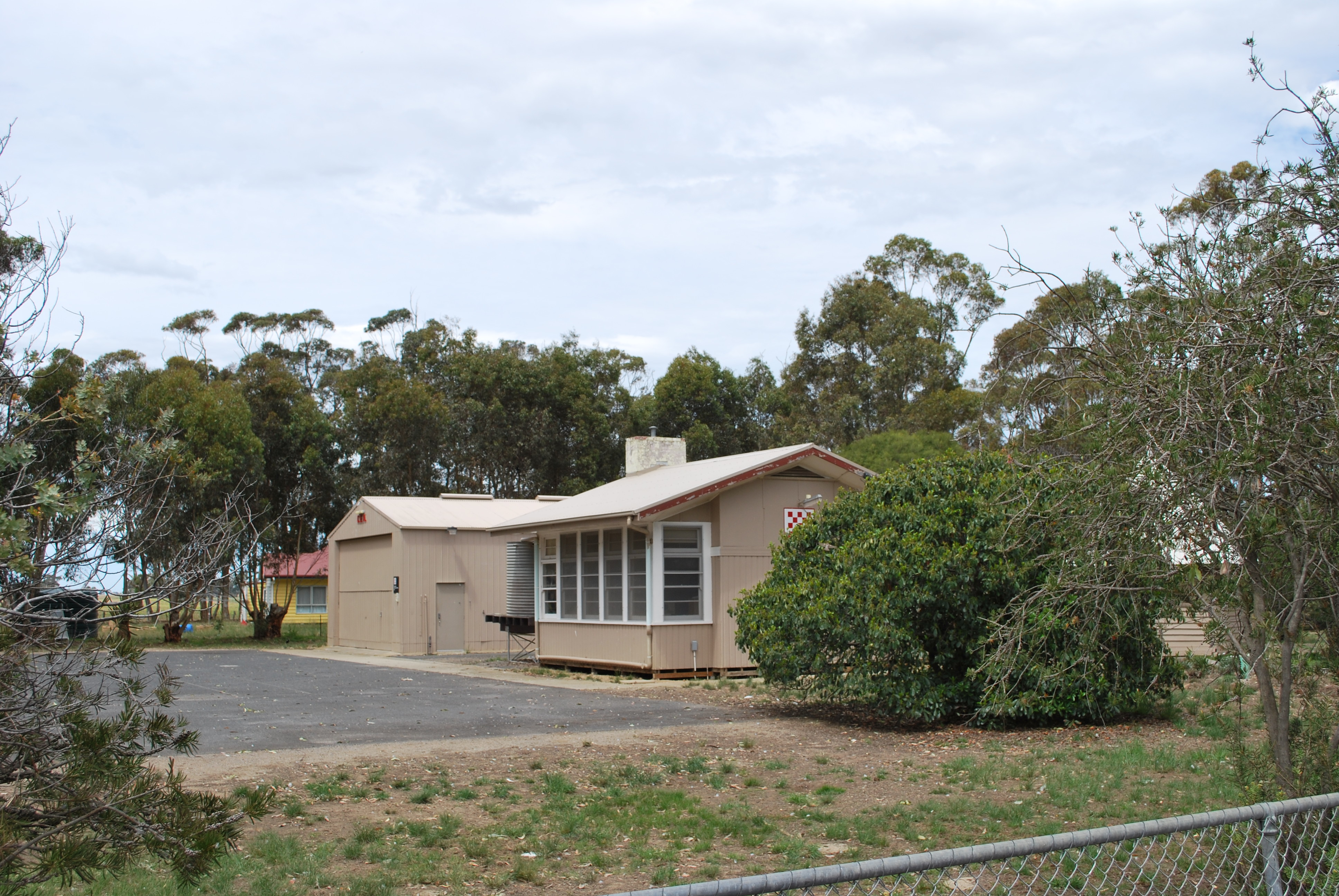
Fire Station (CFA)

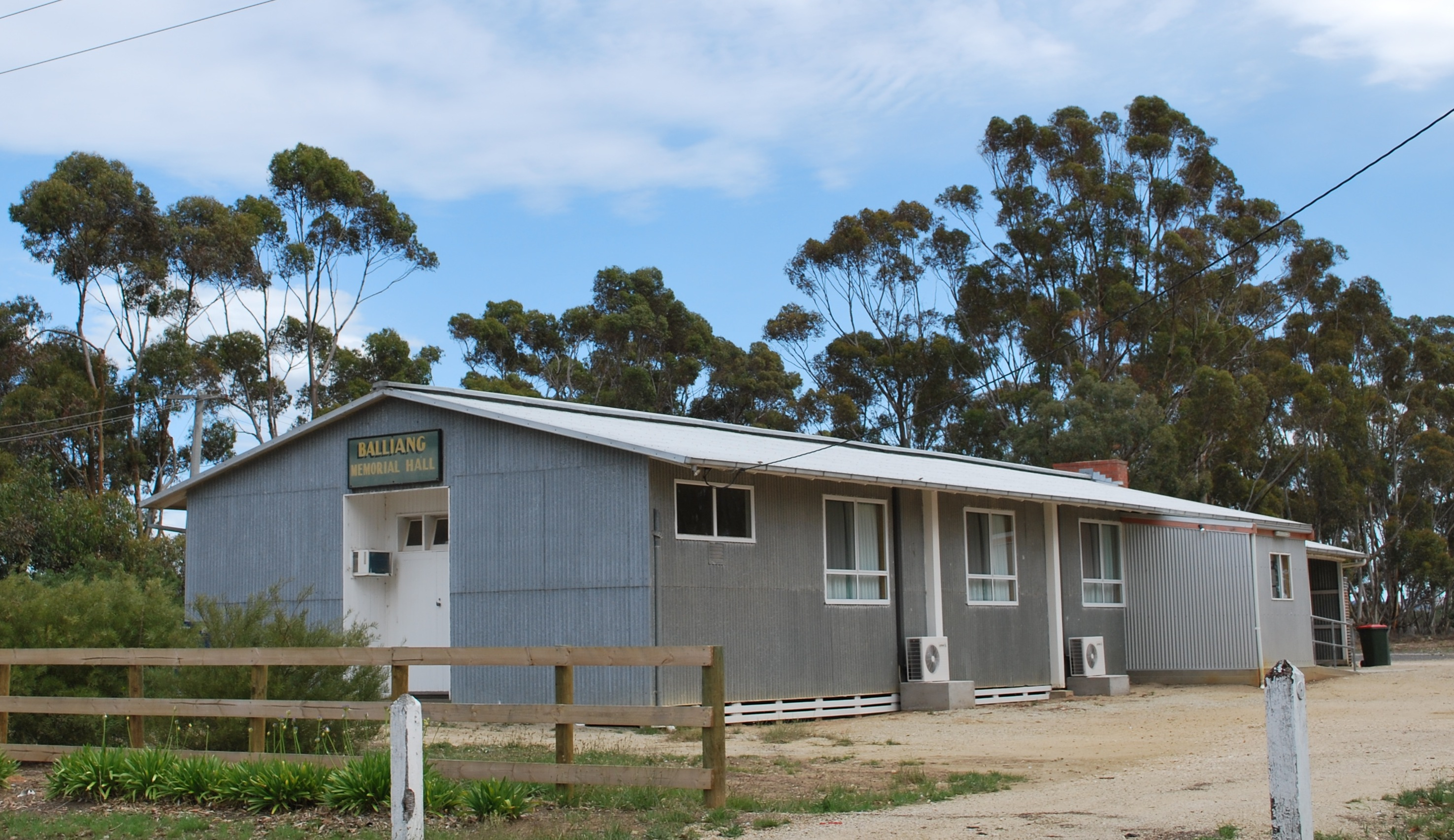
Memorial Hall
