= Werribee Plain =

The Werribee Plain is an expansive low-lying flat land located between the northwestern shore of Port Phillip Bay and the Grampians Central Highlands of Victoria, Australia, shared between Melbourne and Geelong. Named after the Werribee River, the plains are notable for their extensive, flat and rather featureless spans, interspersed by the occasional vertical feature, such as the You Yangs, a series of granite ridges and several small extinct volcanoes.

The Werribee Plain forms the eastern bayside portion of the vast Western Volcanic Plains between the Grampians and the Otway Ranges, which extend from the western suburbs of Melbourne to the South Australian border.

== Geology ==
Volcanoes began erupting lava flows about 4.5 million years ago, and the youngest eruptions are only about 10,000 years old. There are over 400 mapped craters and vents on the plains. While all these individual volcanoes are extinct, the volcanic field itself is only dormant, so new eruptions are possible at any time.

The granite that forms the You Yangs was originally a mass of magma that worked its way up into the surrounding sedimentary rocks during a period of geological time known as the Devonian. The magma crystallised before it reached the surface, so it did not produce any volcanic activity. Instead, a very slow cooling rate allowed many large white crystals of feldspar to form. These can be seen in many of the granite outcrops throughout the ranges.

The nearest volcanoes to the You Yangs are the Anakies, which appear as three low hills on the western horizon. These all have summit craters and provided lava flows for the plains south of the You Yangs. There were also flows from the low volcanoes of Bald Hill and Spring Hill to the north of the You Yangs. When these volcanoes were active, probably between 2 and 3 million years ago, the You Yangs would have been granite islands in a sea of lava.
