= Durdidwarrah =

Durdidwarrah Victoria
- Coordinates: 37°49′0″S 144°11′0″E
- Population: 12 (SAL 2021)
- Postcode(s): 3342
- Time zone: AEST (UTC+10); AEDT (UTC+11) (UTC)
- LGA(s): Golden Plains Shire
- State electorate(s): Eureka
- Federal division(s): Ballarat

Durdidwarrah is a township located about 75 km west of Melbourne, Victoria, Australia.
