= Brisbane Ranges National Park =

National park in Victoria, Australia

- IUCN category II (national park)
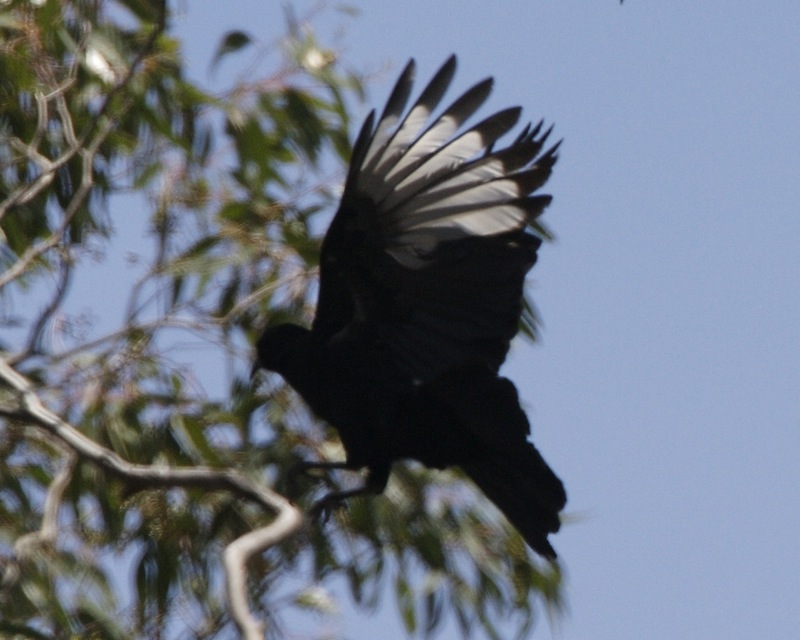
- A white-winged Chough pictured in the park in 2008.

- Location within Victoria
- Location: Victoria
- Nearest city: Meredith
- Coordinates: 37°47′43″S 144°16′43″E
- Area: 77.18 km^{2} (29.80 sq mi)
- Established: 15 August 1973
- Governing body: Parks Victoria
- Website: https://www.parks.vic.gov.au/places-to-see/parks/brisbane-ranges-national-park

The Brisbane Ranges National Park is a national park in the Barwon South West region of Victoria, Australia, The 7,718-hectare (19,070-acre) national park is situated approximately 80 kilometres (50 mi) west of Melbourne near the town of Meredith and is managed by Parks Victoria. The park covers part of the Brisbane Ranges, an area of hills of moderate elevation.

== Features ==
The park features a number of walking tracks, of which the walk through Anakie Gorge is the most popular. Other attractions include the Ted Errey Nature Circuit and Wadawurrung walk. Relatively flat and suitable for those of moderate fitness, the walk features views of the Gorge itself and the presence of koalas and wallabies in their wild state. Some of the resident wallabies are relatively unafraid of tourists and may often study the passing visitors.

In January 2006, lightning sparked a bushfire in the Steiglitz historical area which soon spread throughout the Brisbane Ranges. Despite lengthy efforts to control the fire from Department of Sustainability and Environment, Parks Victoria and the Country Fire Authority fire fighters, the blaze incinerated 6,700 hectares (17,000 acres) of parkland and destroyed two houses without loss of human life. A subsequent bushfire one year later also threatened much of the national park.

== See also ==
- Protected areas of Victoria
