= Wurrook =

Historic homestead in Victoria, Australia

- Wurrook Homestead

- Location in Golden Plains Shire, Victoria
- 37°52′29″S 143°48′04″E
- Type: Homestead, associated built facilities and grounds
- Location: Rokewood, Victoria, Australia
- Nearest city: Ballarat

History
- Built: 1861, 1866
- Built for: Thomas Russell

Site notes
- Architect: George Henderson
- Architectural style: Victorian Gothic

Wurrook is a historic pastoral property and homestead near Rokewood, in the Western District of Victoria, Australia. Established during the 1840s, the estate became a prominent producer of superfine Merino wool under the Russell family, who acquired it in 1857. The property contains a bluestone homestead dating from 1861, together with a nineteenth-century shearing shed and associated agricultural buildings. Since 1954, Wurrook has been owned by the Walton family, who have continued its operation as a merino stud. The estate is also used for visitor accommodation and events.

== History ==
The origins of Wurrook date to 1840, when pastoralist Thomas Bingley and his business partner Compton Ferrers acquired part of the extensive landholdings of the Derwent Company. The property encompassed approximately 30,000 acres (12,000 ha) and was officially known as the Wardy Yallock Chain of Ponds, although it was also referred to as Wurrook. The partnership was subsequently dissolved, and Ferrers became involved in the management of several other pastoral properties in the Western District.

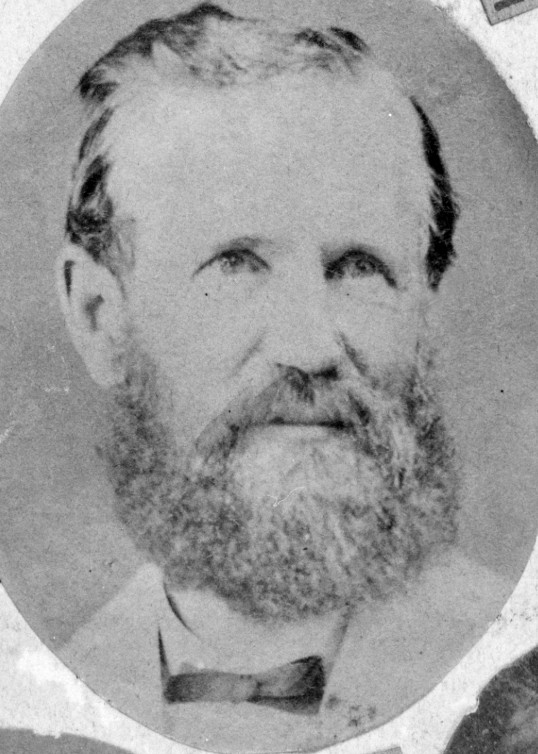
Thomas Russell

In 1857, the estate was purchased by Philip and Thomas Russell, members of a family with extensive pastoral interests across western Victoria. Thomas Russell, who had previously acquired the nearby Barunah Plains estate, subsequently established Wurrook as his principal residence. A substantial bluestone homestead was constructed in 1861, overlooking a lagoon on the Kuruc-A-Ruc Creek. The residence featured spacious interior rooms and an elevated tower providing views over the surrounding countryside.

During the 1860s, the estate underwent further development, including the construction of a larger bluestone shearing shed. Architect Alexander Davidson, who had established his practice at Rokewood after arriving from Scotland in 1864, undertook architectural work at Wurrook in 1866. Davidson later formed a partnership with George Henderson, and both architects became associated with several major homesteads in the Western District, including Barunah Plains and Barwon Park.

The estate was managed for much of the nineteenth and early twentieth centuries by Donald McLaren, who commenced working at Wurrook around 1861. Born in Argyllshire, Scotland, McLaren was entrusted with the day-to-day management of the property by Thomas Russell. He remained at Wurrook for more than five decades, until his death in November 1917.

In late January 1900, a major bushfire swept through part of the Wurrook estate, killing approximately 6,000 sheep and destroying much of the property's grass cover. Workers from the neighbouring Barunah Plains estate assisted in fighting the fire and were credited with preventing the destruction of the Wurrook homestead and its outbuildings.

In December 1910, local resident John Bell, who had recently returned from a journey to Britain and continental Europe, had purchased a portion of the Wurrook.

Another destructive bushfire affected Wurrook in early 1914, after a fire originating in the ranges near Dereel spread across the surrounding countryside. The outbreak was believed to have begun when a spark from a mining retort ignited a nearby woodpile. Driven by strong winds, the flames advanced towards Wurrook Homestead, where more than 100 people reportedly helped bring the fire under control. Approximately 3,000 acres (1,200 ha) of grassland were burnt across the affected district, including 1,000 acres (400 ha) on the Wurrook estate. Fencing and timber were also destroyed, with the total damaged estimated at £2,000.

The stables

The estate remained associated with the Russell family until November 1936, when Eric K. Russell sold the property to G. W. H. Butler. At the time of the sale, Wurrook comprised approximately 8,300 acres (3,400 ha) and was recognised for its production of fine wool. Butler, who also purchased the property's livestock and equipment, relocated to Wurrook with his wife from their former residence, Toolang, near Coleraine.

In 1954, Wurrook was acquired by the Walton family, who moved to the property from Windermere, near Ballarat. The family continued the estate's sheep-breeding operations, with Bruce Walton subsequently assuming responsibility for its management. During the 1980s, Bruce introduced merino breeding stock from the Merryville stud in New South Wales to improve fleece weight and sheep size while retaining the fine quality of the wool produced at Wurrook.

The stud later came under the management of Bruce's son, Paul Walton, representing the third generation of the family at Wurrook. Paul continued the breeding programme and oversaw the estate's participation in agricultural shows and stud sheep sales. By 2012, the property covered approximately 2,800 hectares (6,900 acres) and carried around 18,000 sheep, with the flock undergoing rebuilding following a period of draught. The family also undertook gradual renovations of the homestead.

During the early twenty-first century, the Walton family diversified the estate's operations beyond wool production. Paul and his wife Kylie established Wurrook Superfine Prime, a meat business specialising in hogget and mutton sourced from merino sheep. The products were initially distributed through farmers' markets before becoming available through a wider network of retailers. The enterprise operated alongside the stud's established wool-growing and sheep-breeding activities.

Wurrook has continued to operate as a superfine merino stud under the Walton family. The estate has also expanded into tourism and hospitality, offering accommodation, weddings and private events.

== See also ==
- Kuruc-A-Ruc
- Barunah Plains Homestead
- Mawallok
- Warrambeen
- Mount Mercer Homestead
