= Mount Mercer (homestead) =

Historic homestead in Victoria, Australia

- Mount Mercer Homestead

- Location in Golden Plains Shire, Victoria
- 37°49′06″S 143°52′07″E
- Type: Homestead, associated built facilities and grounds
- Location: Mount Mercer, Victoria, Australia
- Nearest city: Ballarat

History
- Built: 1871–1873
- Built for: Robert Lewis Bell

Mount Mercer is a historic pastoral property and homestead at Mount Mercer, in the Western District of Victoria, Australia, approximately 30 kilometres south of Ballarat. Established during the nineteenth century, the estate was originally associated with pastoralist George Mercer and later the Bell family. Its bluestone homestead, constructed during the early 1870s, forms part of a rural complex that has undergone several subdivisions and changes of ownership. The property was acquired by the Passionists in 1973 and was subsequently returned to private agricultural use. The homestead and its surrounding farmland were sold in February 2025.

== History ==
Mount Mercer originally formed part of the holdings of the Derwent Company, which controlled extensive areas of land in the Port Phillip District. Following the company's dissolution in 1842–1843, the Mount Mercer run passed into the ownership of George Mercer, together with the Weatherboard station and portions of the Gheringhap estate. Mercer retained the property until January 1853, when it sold.

By 1859, the property was acquired by the Bell family, who held substantial pastoral interests in western Victoria. Robert Lewis Bell occupied Mount Mercer during the latter half of the nineteenth century. A substantial homestead was constructed from locally quarried bluestone during 1871–1873, providing a permanent residence for the property's occupants. The single-storey building featured spacious interior rooms, high ceilings and verandahs overlooking the surrounding agricultural land.

On 7 December 1881, Robert Lewis Bell was killed by lightning while returning to the estate with his wife, Robina. Bell had been travelling from Ballarat by horse-drawn buggy and passed through Buninyong at approximately 4:30 pm, where his wife joined him for the remainder of the journey. At around 6 pm, as the couple reached the entrance to their property, a lightning strike brought down their horse and struck bell. The electrical discharge travelled along the right side of his body, scorching his clothing and discolouring his skin. Bell was killed instantly. The horse subsequently broke free from the buggy, throwing both occupants to the ground, befoer running loose around a nearby paddock.

Nearby residents noticed the unattended horse and, concerned that an accident had occurred, went to investigate. They discovered Bell's body near the stables, with his wife standing beside him. Although shaken by the incident, Mrs Bell had escaped serious injury. Dr Scott was summoned to the property, and an inquest was conducted later that evening, returning a verdict of death by lightning. Bell was 47 years old.

The Mount Mercer estate remained associated with the Bell family following Robert Lewis Bell's death. In October 1904, a portion of the property comprising approximately 4,046 acres (1,637 ha) was sold by the firms Charles Walker and Co., McLeod and Booth, and Howe and Campbell to Messrs Vernon and Thomas, of the Grenville district. The reported purchase price was £20,634, equivalent to approximately £5 2s per acre.

By 1906, substantial portions of the former estate had been subdivided into smaller agricultural holdings, with approximately 6,000 acres (2,400 ha) of the former Bell property being divided into farms ranging from 160 to 1,000 acres (65 to 405 ha). Walter Kendall, a farmer who had previously lived at Brim in the Mallee, acquired the homestead and a holding of approximately 1,018 acres (412 ha).

On 23 January that year, a major bushfire swept through the Mount Mercer estate, causing extensive damage to its pasture, fencing and livestock. Walter Kendall, who had recently taken possession of the homestead, was grazing approximately 2,000 sheep and 100 cattle on the property when the fire approached. Assisted by neighbours, Kendall managed to move the cattle and some of the sheep into safer paddocks, but several hundred sheep were killed. Approximately 400 sheep reportedly perished in a single paddock. The flames reached the immediate vicinity of the homestead, although the building survived.

In November 1908, it was reported that W. Kendall had sold the Mount Mercer homestead and approximately 1,020 acres (413 ha) of surrounding land to Charles Cottle Ching, of Colac, for £14 per acre. Ching subsequently operated the property as a grazing estate.

An unusual incident occurred at the property in March 1915, when two horses belonging to Ching were killed following the collapse of a straw stack. The animals had been feeding from the stack and had eaten into its lower sections, causing it to fall and trap them underneath.

Ching remained associated with Mount Mercer until April 1920, when he sold the homestead property and announced his intention to move to Geelong.

During the 1920s, the homestead was acquired by W. F. Lord, who had previously held agricultural properties at Koallah and on the Corangamite estate near Colac. Lord purchased the homestead together with approximately 1,100 acres (445 ha) of grazing land, where he operated a sheep and wool-growing enterprise for around 10 years. He died at the property in March 1934. The estate was subsequently offered at public auction on 27 April 1934. By March 1935, the property belonged to J. T. Thorne.

From 1973 to 1983, Mount Mercer was owned by the Passionists, a Roman Catholic religious congregation. The property was intend to expand a cattle agistment programme associated with St Gabriel's Monastery, Highton and overseen by Brother Mark Wells. The agricultural operation provided financial support for the religious congregation's student formation programme.

The property later returned to private agricultural ownership and continued to be used for livestock grazing and other farming activities, and in February 2025, the historic estate was divided between two purchasers following the retirement of its previous owners. An interstate farming family acquired the homestead and approximately 412 ha (1,018), while two adjoining farming properties were purchased by a local buyer.

== See also ==
- Kuruc-A-Ruc
- Wurrook
- Warrambeen
- Glenfine
