= Golf Hill =

Historic homestead in Victoria, Australia

- Golf Hill, 1975

- Location in Golden Plains Shire, Victoria
- 37°59′55″S 143°58′29″E
- Type: Homestead, associated built facilities and grounds
- Location: Shelford, Victoria, Australia
- Nearest city: Geelong

History
- Built: 1876
- Built for: George Russell

Site notes
- Architect: Smith & Johnson
- Architectural style: French Second Empire

Golf Hill is a historic pastoral property and homestead near Shelford in western Victoria, Australia. Established during the earliest period of European pastoral settlement in the Port Phillip District, it became the home of Scottish-born pastoralist George Russell and the centre of extensive pastoral interests associated with the Clyde Company. The property contains a substantial nineteenth-century homestead, landscaped grounds and a collection of early agricultural buildings, including stables, workers' quarters, a store and woolshed. The present homestead, principally dating from 1876, was designed by Melbourne architects Smith & Johnson and is an unusual Victorian example of French Second Empire-influenced domestic architecture.

== History ==
The origins of Golf Hill are associated with the Clyde Company, a joint-stock pastoral enterprise established in the Port Phillip District in 1836. George Russell arrived from Van Diemen's Land that year with his half-brother Philip and became closely involved in managing the company's rapidly expanding pastoral interests. The company's headquarters were subsequently transferred from Millar's Flat, near Batesford, to the Leigh River area, with Golf Hill developing as its principal station. The property took its name from a Scottish estate associated with the Dennistoun family.

From Golf Hill, Russell oversaw a network of runs and outstations extending across a large part of what became western Victoria, from the country beyond Geelong towards the Great Dividing Range and westwards towards the Hopkins River. Initially an employee and manager of the Clyde Company, he became a partner by 1844. The enterprise proved highly profitable before being wound up in 1857–1858, returning its investors more than three times their original capital. Russell's extensive business records and correspondence were later edited by P. L. Brown as the seven-volume "Clyde Company Papers", which became an important documentary source for the history of pastoral settlement in colonial Victoria.

Golf Hill's first residence was a rudimentary timber structure. In 1846 Russell commissioned Geelong architect and surveyor Alexander John Skene to design a more substantial brick cottage. A timber drawing room was added in 1867 and connected to the earlier building by a verandah. Most of the 1846 residence was subsequently demolished when the present homestead was constructed in 1876, although the 1867 timber addition was incorporated into the new house and survives as its oldest section.

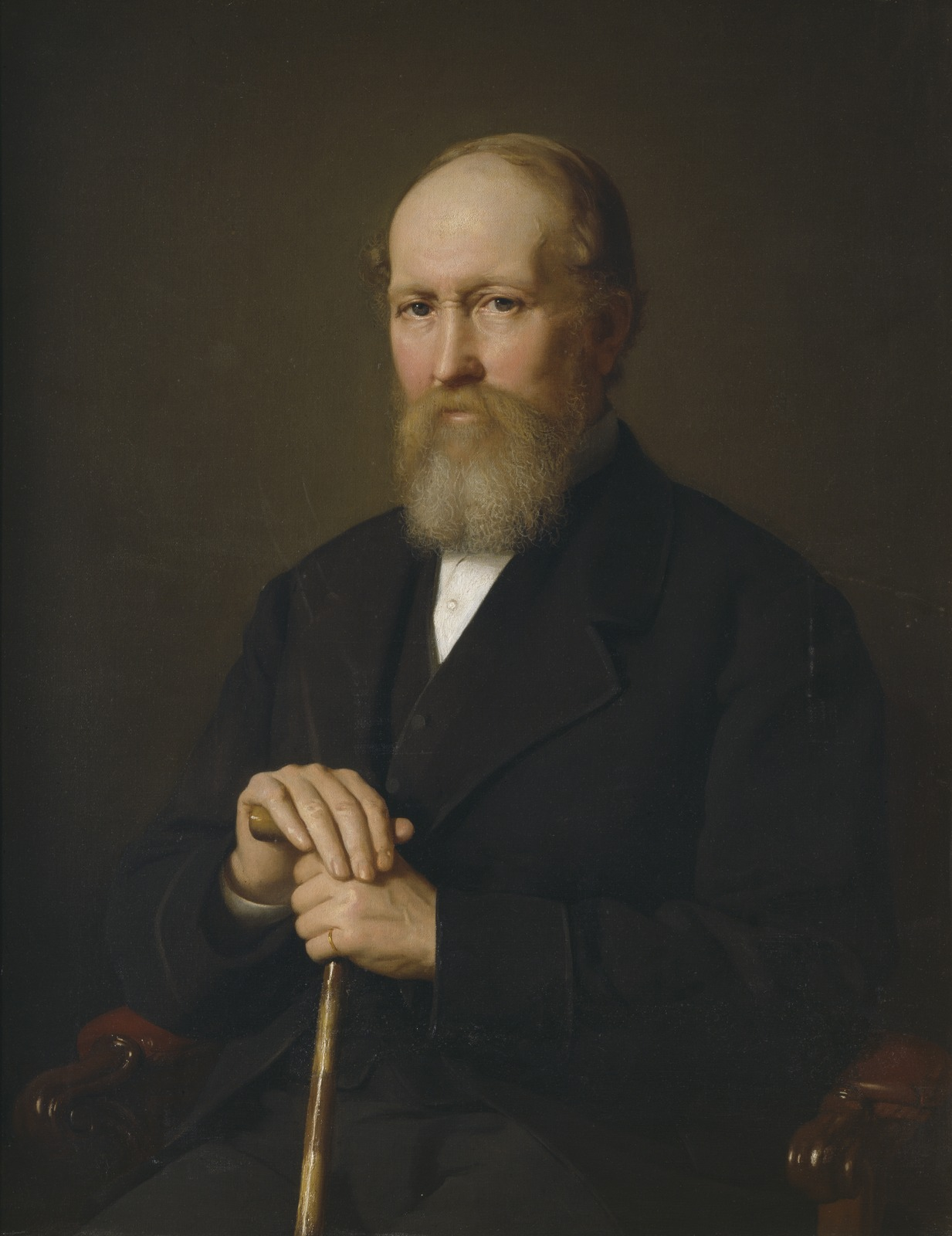
George Russell

Euphemia Russell

Russell travelled to Britain in the early 1850s and in 1852 married his counsin Euphemia Leslie Carstairs in Scotland. On returning to Victoria he encountered the economic upheaval accompanying the gold rushes but ultimately remained in the colony. When he Clyde Company disposed of its properties in 1857, Russell acquired Golf Hill for £34,000 and continued to expand his pastoral investments elsewhere in Victoria and New South Wales. These included interests in Elderslie Station, Leslie Manor and Thononga Station.

During the nineteenth century, Golf Hill was among the properties along the Leigh River affected by pollution associated with gold mining around Ballarat. Landholders complained that mining sludge travelled downstream, accumulating within the river channel and across adjoining flats. The deposits affected productive agricultural land and contributed to worsening floods along the river.

The development of Golf Hill was accompanied by the construction of an extensive group of station buildings. A brick store was erected in 1854, followed by bluestone light-horse stables in 1864 and men's quarters in 1865. Other structures included carthorse stables and a woolshed.

View of the homestead from the garden

The present main homestead was commissioned in 1876 from the Melbourne architectural partnership of Alfred Louis Smith and Arthur Ebden Johnson. Both architects had previously worked for the Victorian Public Works Department and later designed numerous prominent houses and public buildings. Their best-known institutional work was the Melbourne Law Courts complex. At Golf Hill they produced an unusually elaborate rural residence influenced by the French Second Empire style.

George and Euphemia Russell had eight children, comprising seven daughters and one son. Euphemia died at Golf Hill in 1867 at the age of 37. Russell remained at the property until his death in 1888. A committed Presbyterian, he was an influential supporter of the denomination in the Western District and was also a patron of Geelong College. Members of the wider Russell family established themselves on properties throughout the region, forming part of the network of interrelated pastoral families that became prominent in the Western District during the nineteenth century.

Janet Biddlecombe

Golf Hill eventually passed to Russell's youngest daughter, Janet, later the wife of Commander John Biddlecombe, who retained the estate into the twentieth century. Commander Biddlecombe, who was a retired Merchant Marine officer in the Royal Navy, seeing action in China and South Africa, lived on the property for his remaining years until his death in 1929. A memorial stained glass window was subsequently placed in the adjacent Shelford Presbyterian Church. The property became well known for its Hereford cattle stud. Following the Second World War, portions of the estate were acquired and subdivided for soldier settlement. After Biddlecombe's death in 1954, the contents of the homestead were dispersed by sale.

Later that year, John Barber of Coliban Park, Metcalfe, purchased the Golf Hill homestead together with approximately 2,450 acres from Biddlecombe's estate. Barber subsueqently relocated his Coliban Park Hereford stud to the property. The property remains in the Barber family today.

== See also ==
- Barwon Park
- Barunah Plains Homestead
- Glenfine
- Mawallok
