= Shelford Presbyterian Church =

Closed Presbyterian church in Shelford, Victoria, Australia

- Leigh Presbyterian Church
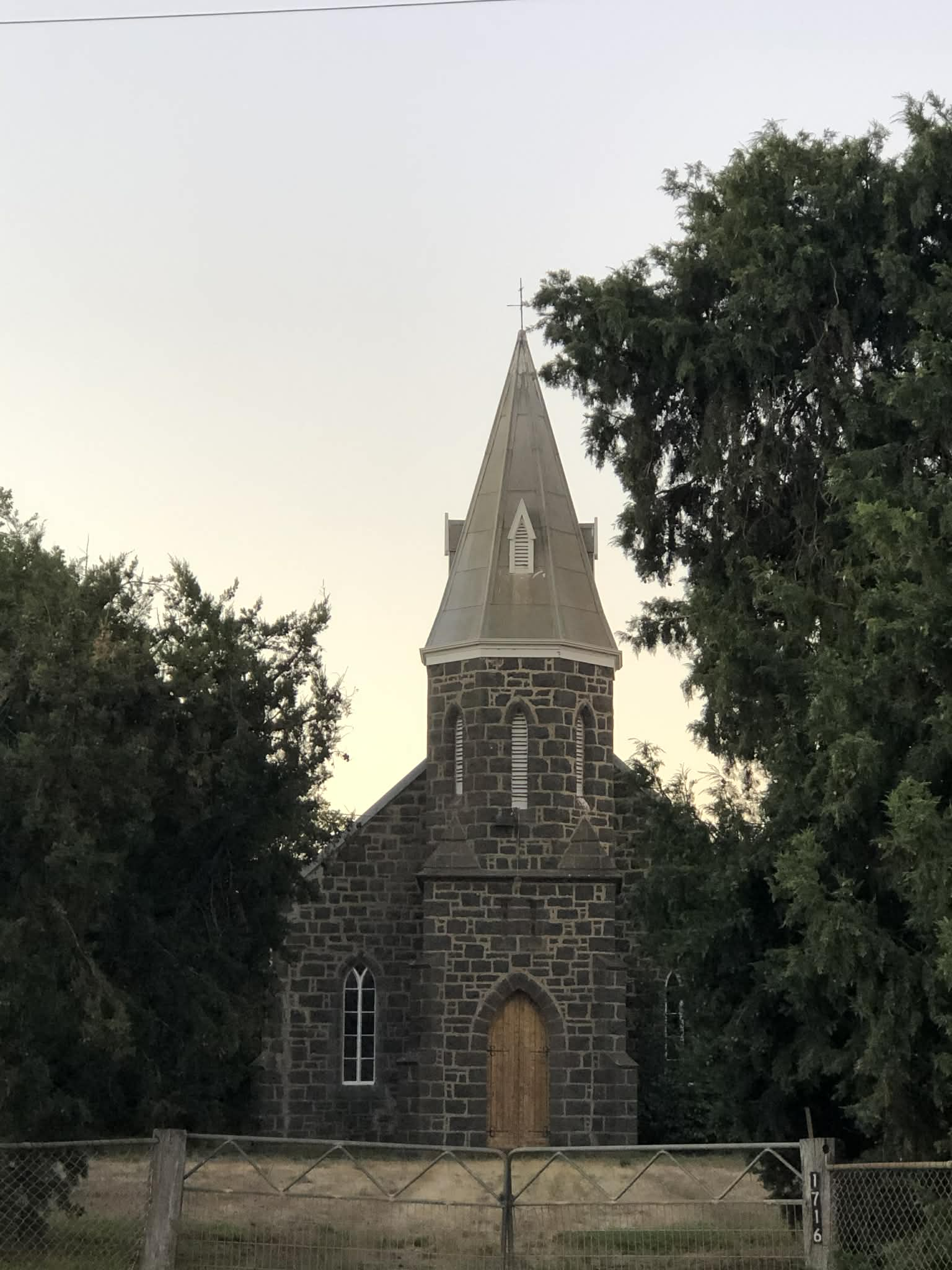
- Shelford Presbyterian Church, Shelford, Victoria, Australia, 2026
- Shelford Presbyterian Church
- 38.013485°S 143.981757°E
- Address: 1716 Bannockburn-Shelford Road, Shelford, Victoria
- Country: Australia
- Denomination: Presbyterian

History
- Status: Closed (private residence)

Architecture
- Architect: Joseph Lowe Shaw
- Architectural type: Church
- Style: Victorian Gothic
- Years built: 1859
- Closed: 2022

Victorian Heritage Register
- Official name: Leigh Presbyterian Church
- Type: Heritage Place
- Reference no.: 23702
- Heritage Overlay number: HO103, HO62

Shelford Presbyterian Church (also known as the Leigh Presbyterian Church) is a closed Presbyterian church located in the town of Shelford, Victoria, Australia. The church, built in 1859 to the design of Geelong architect Joseph Lowe Shaw, is listed on the Victorian Heritage Register, along with a stained glass window designed by Christian Waller.

== History ==
The establishment of the church was the product of efforts from several wealthy pastoralists in the area, notably George Russell of Golf Hill, adjacent to the church, James Kinninmont, Alexander Armstrong of Warrambeen, the Russells of Barunah Plains, R. L. Bell of Mount Mercer, John and James Bell, and H. M. Wilson of Shelford. The church was built in 1859, and was one of Geelong-based architect Joseph Lowe Shaw's earliest Presbyterian church works.

The church was put up for sale in November 2022, and was sold on 10 December 2022, for $645,000.

=== Memorial stained glass window ===
The church contains a memorial stained glass window, dedicated to Commodore John Biddlecombe (1858–1929). Commodore Biddlecombe joined the navy, initially as Merchant Marine officer in England, then as a lieutenant, seeing action in China and South Africa, and upon retiring, with the rank of commodore, resided at Golf Hill, where he died. The window contains several nods to his naval career, with the central section containing a large galleon, alongside Saint Andrew (for Biddlecombe's Scottish heritage) and Saint Nicholas, patron saint of sailors.The window was commissioned by Janet Biddlecombe, John's widow, and designed by Christian Waller.

== See also ==
- Rokewood Uniting Church
