= Rokewood Junction =

- Town
- Coordinates: 37.84428°S 143.67742°E
- Country: Australia
- State: Victoria
- LGA: Golden Plains Shire
- Location: 140 km (87 mi) W of Melbourne; 75 km (47 mi) NW of Geelong; 41 km (25 mi) S of Ballarat

Government
  - State electorate: Polwarth
  - Federal division: Ballarat

Population
  - Total: 32 (2016 census)
- Postcode: 3330
Localities around Rokewood Junction
Cape Clear	Corindhap; Dereel	Mount Mercer
Werneth	Rokewood Junction	Shelford
Cressy	Barunah Park	Rokewood

Rokewood Junction is a locality in Victoria, Australia in the Golden Plains Shire, 140 kilometres (87 mi) west of the state capital, Melbourne.
