= William Hixon McDonald =

William Hixon McDonald may refer to:

- William Hixon McDonald (junior) (1840–1898), Australian miner, political candidate and pioneer of Corindhap, Victoria
- William Hixon McDonald (senior) (died 1869), Australian soldier-settler, amongst the first gold miners at Corindhap, Victoria
