= Kuruc-A-Ruc =

Historic homestead in Victoria, Australia

- Kuruc-A-Ruc Homestead

- Location in Golden Plains Shire, Victoria
- 37°53′32″S 143°44′50″E
- Type: Homestead, associated built facilities and grounds
- Location: Rokewood, Victoria, Australia
- Nearest city: Ballarat

History
- Built: 1840 (later additions)
- Built for: George Aitchison, David Aitchison

Site notes
- Architect: Alexander Davidson (later additions)
- Architectural style: Colonial

Kuruc-A-Ruc is a historic pastoral property and homestead complex near Corindhap and Rokewood, in the Western District of Victoria, Australia. Established in the late 1830s, it was among the earliest pastoral runs in the district and was associated with the Aitchison and Elder families during the nineteenth and twentieth centuries. The homestead, situated beside Kuruc-A-Ruc Creek, was constructed during the mid-nineteenth century and subsequently extended to designs by architect Alexander Davidson. The property is currently used for agricultural purposes and visitor accommodation.

== History ==
The Kuruc-A-Ruc pastoral run was established in 1838 by the Derwent Company, making it one of the earliest pastoral holdings in the surrounding district. The lease was subsequently acquired by the Aitchison family, with brothers George and David Aitchison taking possession in 1839. An early stone hut was constructed around 1840, followed by the development of additional buildings. By 1852, David Aitchison had become the sole proprietor of the run, and the following year he applied for a 640-acre (260 ha) pre-emptive right over the homestead land.

The original section of the homestead is believed to have been constructed during the early 1850s. Built predominantly from local stone, it formed part of a growing pastoral complex that included stbales, workers' accommodation and other agricultural buildings.

Rosemary Elder (1935-2025), holding wool (pictured 1953)

In October 1857, ownership of Kuruc-A-Ruc passed to John Elder and his sons William, John junior and Nairne Guthrie Elder. The family maintained the property as a pastoral station and undertook substantial improvements to its buildings, and in 1866 architect Alexander Davidson designed extensions to both ends of the existing homestead. Davidson, who had arrived in Rokewood from Scotland in 1864, also designed the nearby Rokewood Presbyterian Church.

The homestead was surrounded by an extensive garden, with many of its established trees believed to date from the nineteenth century. Plantings included several varieties of cypress, together with olive and mulberry trees. Two Italian cypresses were named Gog and Magog by the Elder family. The garden was laid out around the homestead and its principal approaches.

Outbuildings at the homestead

In January 1881, a bushfire broke out in a cultivated paddock immediately south of the homestead. Donald McLaren, manager of Thomas Russell's neighbouring Wurrook station, was visiting Kuruc-A-Ruc when he noticed the fire. McLaren joined Andrew Gillespie, the station's overseer, and five workers from a nearby mining claim in attempting to suppress the flames. Gillespie also helped move horses and cattle away from the affected paddock, although several animals initially escaped towards the fire. All of the livestock were saved.

Rear of the homestead

On 4 January 1907, George Lynch, a farm labourer who owned a small property at Corindhap, died suddenly while walking at Kuruc-A-Ruc station. Lynch had reportedly appeared to be in his usual state of health immediately before his death.

The Elder family continued to occupy and manage Kuruc-A-Ruc during the early twentieth century. John Nairne Elder farmed the estate until his retirement to Geelong in 1928, where he later died in June 1946. The property's original woolshed had been demolished during the nineteenth century, and a replacement was constructed in 1929. Helen Somerville Elder (née Gillespie) died in 1951, and she had also subsequently lived in Geelong.

After more than a century of association with the Elder family, Kuruc-A-Ruc was sold to the Muller brothers in 1963. The property changed hands again in 1973, when it was acquired by the Boyle family. Restoration of the historic gardens was undertaken during the 1990s, including the rehabilitation of established plantings and landscaping. The homestead itself was also restored, with the Boyle family returning to occupy in 2002. Later additions provided modern kitchen, dining and living facilities while retaining the building's historic character.

In May 2022, Kuruc-A-Ruc was sold, comprising approximately 580 hectares (1,400 acres). It has since been acquired by nearby Wurrook station, and the homestead has been made available for short-term accommodation, including private retreats and group stays, while the surrounding land has continued to be used for agricultural purposes.

== See also ==
- Glenfine
- Barunah Plains Homestead
- Gala
- Poligolet
