= William Hixon McDonald (junior) =

Australian miner, political candidate and pioneer

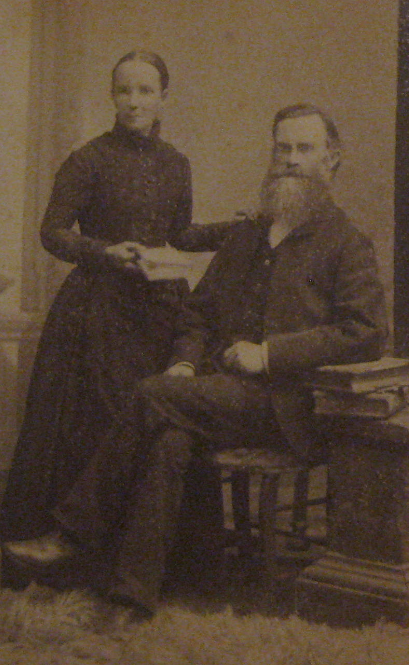
William Hixon McDonald (jnr) and Kezia Rankin c.1885

William Hixon McDonald (junior) (1840-1898) was an Australian miner, political candidate and pioneer of Corindhap, Victoria.

== Biography ==
William McDonald was born in Green Ponds (now known as Kempton), Van Diemen's Land on 8 June 1840. His father, William Hixon McDonald (senior), was a soldier with the 2nd/51st King’s Own Light Infantry Regiment and had been stationed in Van Diemen's Land since 1838.

After his father purchased a discharge from the army, the family crossed the Bass Strait to settle on the mainland at Freshwater Creek in the Parish of Duneed, south of Geelong in 1847. It was here, that McDonald met and married Kezia Rankin (1844-1893), daughter of Samuel and Sarah Rankin and the aunt of Edwin ‘Teddy’ Rankin, the renowned Geelong footballer. William and Kezia had 15 children. Other members of the Rankin family also played for Geelong.

During the Victorian goldrush, the McDonalds moved to Corindhap, where both father and son tried their luck at the Break o'Day diggings. They were among the first and most successful miners of the region, unearthing, with other partners in 1877, one of the biggest nuggets of the district, dubbed the ‘Christmas Gift’ and weighing 175 ounces.

McDonald used the money he earned on the Corindhap goldfields to purchase farming land. He also worked as a blacksmith, part-time. By 1868 he had accumulated over 200 acres and built a fine stone homestead. The family was burnt out in 1869, losing their home and possessions. McDonald rebuilt and went on to become a leading citizen of the fledgling Corindhap and Rokewood communities. He managed the mining interests in the area for Elders Estate and served as auditor for a number of companies, including North Mack’s Lucky Gold Mining Company and Laidler’s Extended Company. In 1889, he was appointed mining registrar for the Staffordshire Reef district and led a successful campaign to create a school for the district. He also captained the Rokewood cricket team.

McDonald's wife Kezia died in 1893, when he was 52 and with four of his nine surviving children still living at home. The following year, he married 40-year-old widow Eliza Underwood.

In 1897 McDonald stood in the local municipal elections, having been approached to stand as a candidate for West Riding of the Shire of Leigh, but he fell ill and was unable to mount an effective election campaign. He was defeated in the poll. He died from a stroke on 23 April 1898 and is buried in Rokewood Cemetery near Corindhap.
