= Corangamite =

Corangamite may refer to:

- Division of Corangamite
- Lake Corangamite
- Corangamite Shire
- Corangamite Catchment Management Authority
