= Warrambeen =

Historic homestead in Victoria, Australia

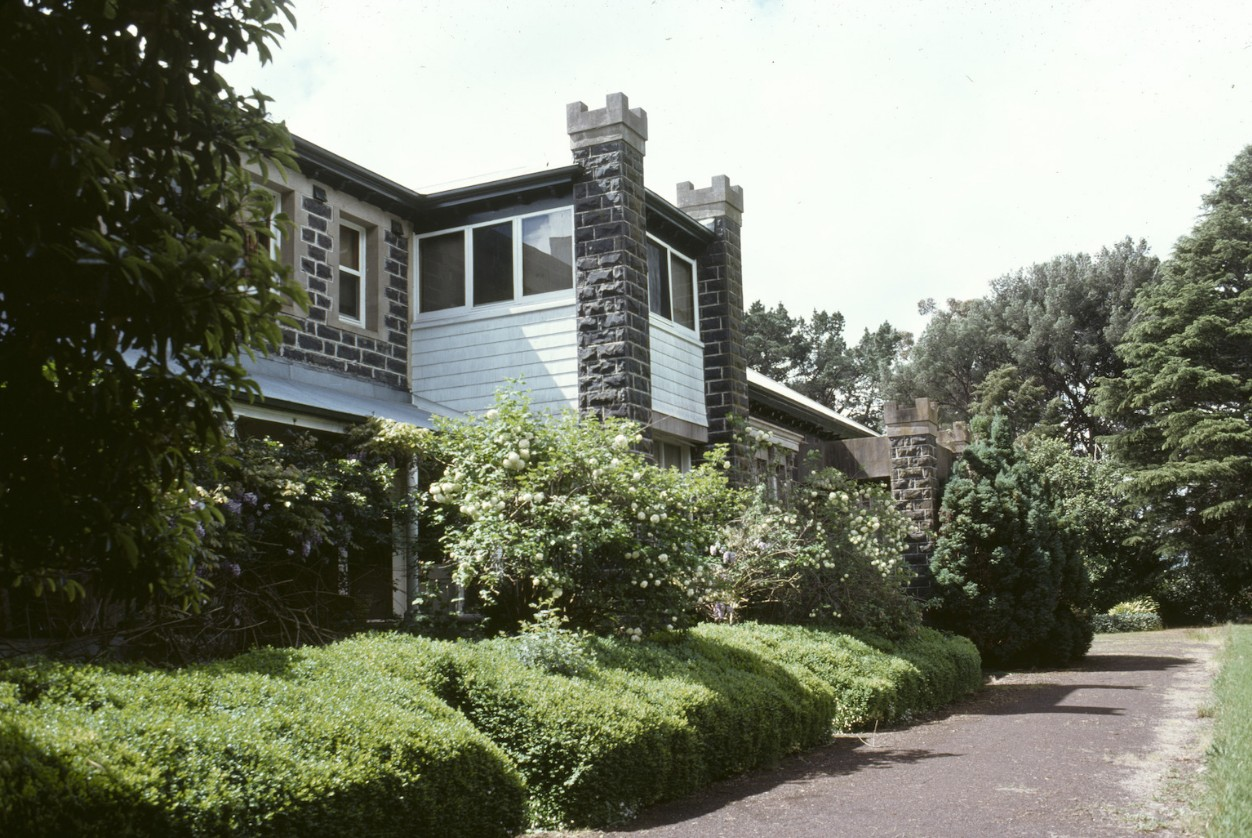
- Warrambeen Homestead

- Location in Golden Plains Shire, Victoria
- 37°55′51″S 143°51′54″E
- Type: Homestead, associated built facilities and grounds
- Location: Shelford, Victoria, Australia
- Nearest city: Ballarat

History
- Built: 1847 (later additions)

Site notes
- Architect(s): Buchan, Laird & Buchan

Warrambeen is a historic pastoral property near Shelford in the Western District region of Victoria, Australia. Established during the early years of European settlement in the Port Phillip District, the property developed into one of the district's substantial sheep stations and remains associated with wool production and mixed farming. The property is noted for its historic homestead complex that incorporates the original 1847 homestead with later additions, and its extensive areas of remnant native grassland.

== History ==
The land encompassing Warrambeen originally formed part of the holdings of the Derwent Company. In 1842, J. J. B. Smythe took up country along Warrambine Creek before selling the run two years later to brothers John and William Thomson. The Thomsons established the first section of the homestead in 1847, constructing a colonial-style residence that survives as the southern portion of the present building.

Ownership subsequently passed to A. F. Cunningham before the property was acquired in 1854 by Scottish pastoralist John "Big" Bell. Bell was one of the major landholders of Victoria's Western District and also owned nearby Mount Mercer. During his tenure, Warrambeen expanded into a substantial pastoral estate, and many of the property's principal bluestone buildings were constructed, including the woolshed, shearers' quarters and additions to the homestead. Furthur extensions were undertaken in 1864, adding additional bedrooms, a dining room, drawing room and a new kitchen. Bell eventually retired to Geelong, leaving the management of the station to Alexander Armstrong.

English-born writer Louisa Anne Meredith stayed at the property en route to the Goldfields.

Following Armstrong's death, the property passed through a period of leasing before being purchased at auction at Scott's Hotel in Melbourne on 10 October 1902 by brothers Arthur and Henry Bingley. The Bingleys established a Merino stud based partly on sheep from Bell's flock and supplemented with bloodlines from leading studs including Eurambeen, Barunah Plains and Boonoke. Their acquisition marked the beginning of more than a century of Bingley association with the property.

Arthur Bingley married Elsie Gardener in 1906 and had two sons, Pendock ("Dock") and Terry. Following Arthur's death in 1940, Terry remained at Warrambeen while Dock moved to the nearby property The Meadows at Rokewood. The brothers continued to operate the family's Merino breeding enterprise in partnership, with later generations maintaining the stud throughout much of the twentieth century.

In 1933, the homestead underwent significant alterations to designs prepared by the Geelong architectural firm Buchan, Laird & Buchan. These additions included the upper storey, twin turrets and entrance portico that give the building much of its present appearance. The surrounding garden retained a number of mature nineteenth-century plantings, including bunya pines, Himalayan cedars, stone pines, hoop pines and Monterey cypress hedges.

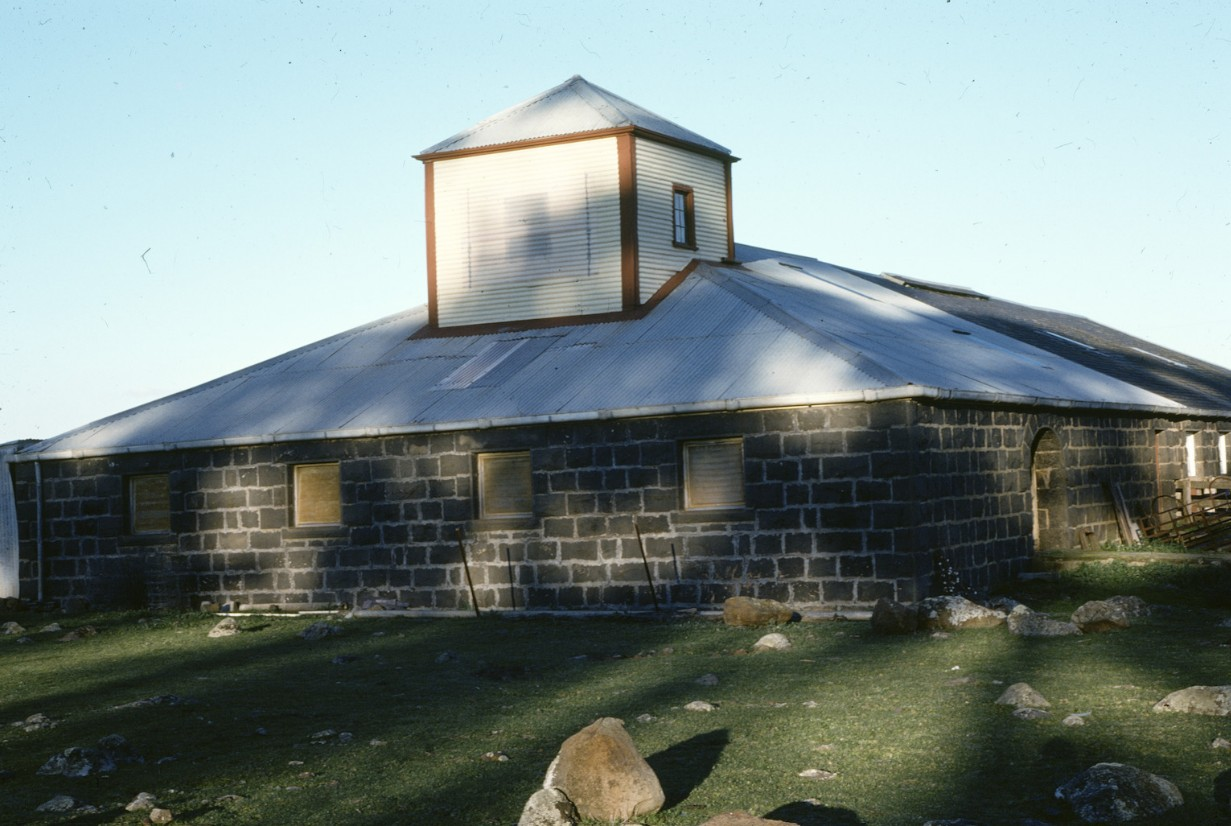
The woolshed

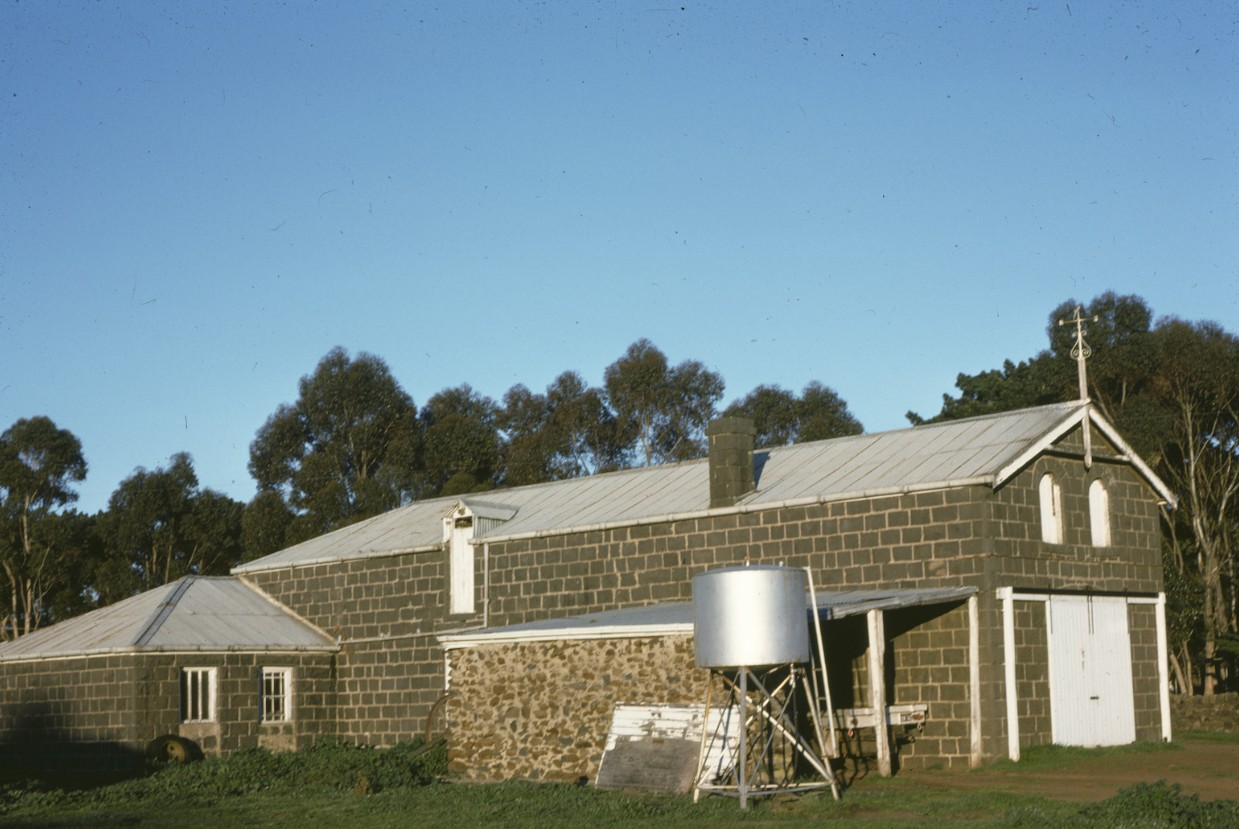
The stables

The property's connection with the Taylor family began in 1973 when Trish Taylor (née Bingley) married Tasmanian grazier Ian Taylor, whose family had been involved in Merino breeding since the early nineteenth century. After operating the family property "Kenilworth" in Tasmania for 17 years, Ian and Trish Taylor moved permanently to Warrambeen in 1989 following the death of Terry Bingley. They subsequently transferred livestock from Tasmania to Victoria, including descendants of the historic Saxon Merino bloodlines developed by the Taylor family.

During the late twentieth century Warrambeen became increasingly recognised for its environmental and educational significance, and in 1995 the property became the site of a Landcare Education Centre and demonstration farm established through a partnership involving ALCOA Landcare, Greening Australia, government agencies and local organisations. The program promoted sustainable farming practices and environmental management to farmers, students and visitors.

Warrambeen also contains approximately 1,000 acres (405 ha) of remnant native grassland, one of the largest surviving privately managed examples in Victoria. The grasslands support a number of threatened plant and animal species, including the stiped legless lizard, golden sun moth, spiny rice-flower and clover glycine. Since the 1990s, extensive revegetation programs have seen thousands of trees planted across the property as part of ongoing conservation efforts.

== See also ==
- Barwon Park
