= Wingeel, Victoria =

Wingeel
- Coordinates: 38°05′00″S 143°51′00″E
- Country: Australia
- State: Victoria
- LGAs: Golden Plains Shire; Colac Otway Shire
- Location: 47 km (29 mi) W of Geelong; 66 km (41 mi) S of Ballarat; 117 km (73 mi) SW of Melbourne

Government
  - State electorate: Polwarth
  - Federal division: Wannon

Population
  - Total: 26 (2021 census)
- Postcode: 3321
Localities around Wingeel
Barunah Plains	Barunah Park	Barunah Park
Weering	Wingeel	Hesse
Eurack	Ombersley	Ombersley

Wingeel is a locality in Victoria, Australia. The locality straddles both the Colac Otway Shire and the Golden Plains Shire, the former containing the largest portion. In the 2021 census, Wingeel had a population of 26.

== History ==
The Western standard gauge railway line passes through Wingeel.

The name is attested as early as 1859, with a listing in The Age for "Country Lots" in Geelong, stating:

Wingeel, situated immediately north of the home station of Messrs Thomas Russell and Co., at the Long Water Hole, and on and near the Warrambine Creek, west of the parish of Shelford, being portions 11 to 18, 20, 22 to 27, 31 to 38, and 40 to 42, containing from 112 to 194 acres. Upset price, £1 per acre.

Like much of the Western District, the Wingeel area was subject to land subdivision as a result of the Soldier Settlement Scheme in 1950. The region was split up and designated to 10 property owners in the 'Subdivision of the Southern Portion of Barunah Plains Estate', the property owners being:

- D. Richmond
- A. Cartledge
- G. Lynch
- A. Bogie
- A. Cumming
- J. Ellis
- C. McIntosh
- W. Quinlivian
- A. McDonald
- J. Hughes

A memorial plaque commemorates this subdivision, which was erected by the Leigh Valley Lions Club in 2010. It can be found on the southern side of the Hamilton Highway in between Mia Mia Creek and Barunah Plains Road.

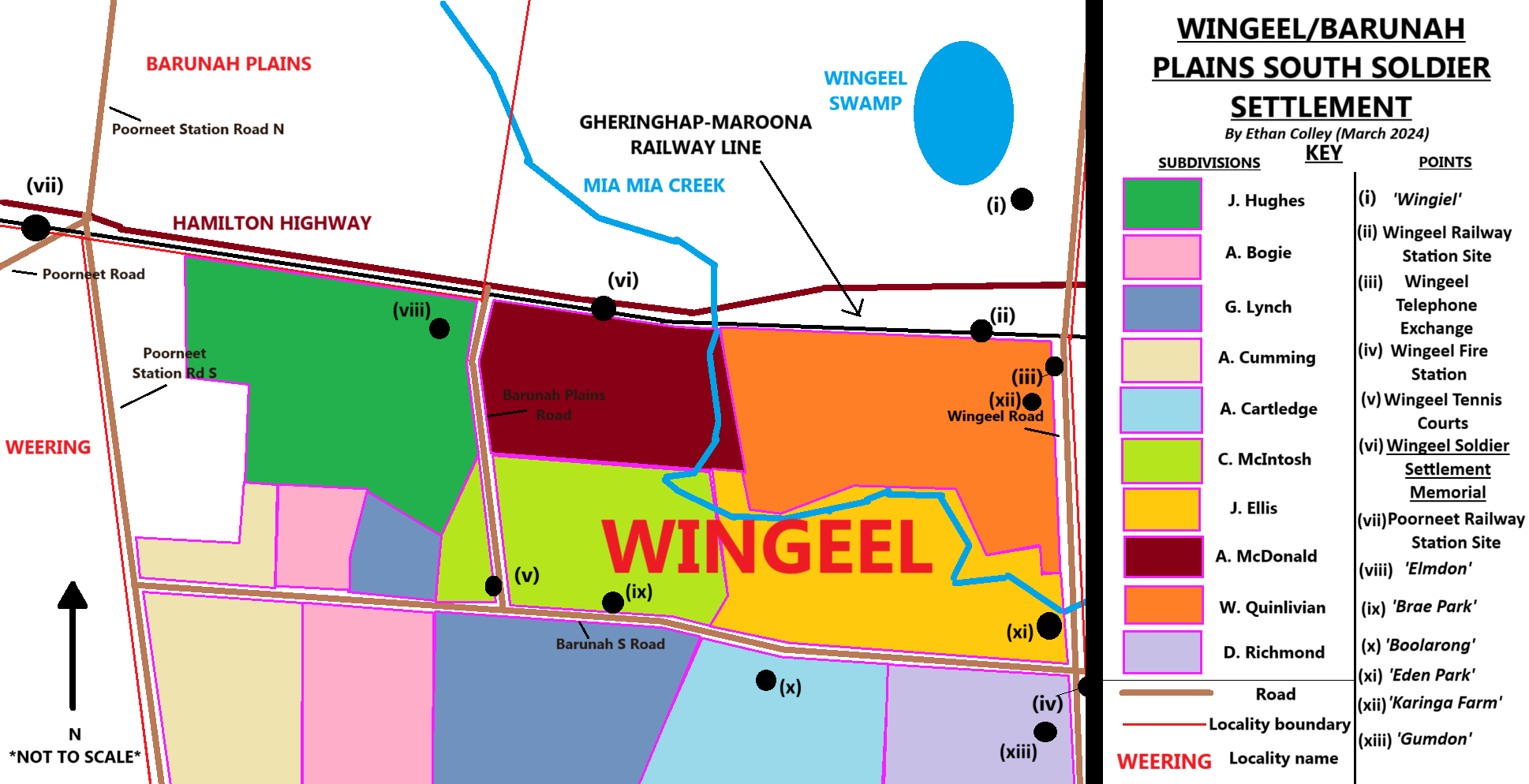
A rough diagram of the soldier settlements in the Wingeel area

A 1999 article in The Age refers to "folks down Wingeel way, on the Hamilton Highway west of Geelong", detailing how an antique World War II-era fire truck continues to be used by the Wingeel fire brigade.

== Features ==
Wingeel has a fire station operated by the CFA and a telephone exchange run by Telstra. Additionally, Wingeel is home to a tennis club, consisting of two tennis courts and a storage shed, which have in recent times been in a state of neglect and disrepair.

Named properties in the area include:

- "Wingiel"
- "Karinga Farm"
- "Brae Park"
- "Elmdon"
- "Eden Park"
- "Boolarong"
- "Gumdon"
- "Ross Hut"
