= Hesse, Victoria =

Hesse
- Coordinates: 38°05′04″S 143°53′12″E
- Country: Australia
- State: Victoria
- LGA: Golden Plains Shire
- Location: 41 km (25 mi) W of Geelong; 58 km (36 mi) S of Ballarat; 99 km (62 mi) SW of Melbourne

Government
  - State electorate: Polwarth
  - Federal division: Wannon

Population
  - Total: 19 (2016 census)
- Postcode: 3321
Localities around Hesse
Barunah Park	Barunah Park	Shelford
Wingeel	Hesse	Inverleigh
Ombersley	Ombersley	Inverleigh

Hesse is a locality in the Golden Plains Shire, Victoria, Australia. In the 2016 census, it had a population of 19 people.

Hesse covers an area of rural farmland along the Hamilton Highway between the towns of Cressy and Inverleigh. The Western standard gauge line runs through the locality; while Hesse never had a station, the former station at Wingeel was close to the Hesse boundary. Wentworths Road, which runs north/north-west in the direction of Shelford, is the only other significant road in the locality. The Warrambine and Mia Mia Creeks also run through Hesse.

Warrambine post office opened on 16 January 1871, was renamed Hesse Post Office on 14 February 1871, and closed on 1 July 1899. A postal receiving office opened at Hesse in 1903, and a second Hesse Post Office was opened on 17 February 1914. It became a receiving office again on 1 August 1914, a post office again on 1 July 1927, and finally closed on 31 January 1966.

The Barunah Plains Homestead is located in Hesse, despite nearby localities bearing the name "Barunah Plains" and "Barunah Park", reflecting the extensive area of the original Barunah Plains property. The homestead hosts the annual Beyond The Valley Festival over the New Year period.
