= William Hixon McDonald (senior) =

Australian soldier-settler and gold miner

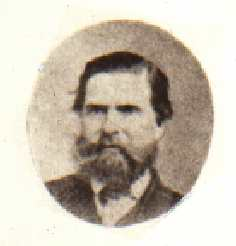
Believed to be William Hixon McDonald (senior), miner and pioneer of Corindhap, c. 1856

William Hixon McDonald (senior) (1815-1869) was an Australian soldier-settler, who was amongst the first gold miners at Corindhap, Victoria.

== Biography ==
McDonald was born c. 1815 in Enniscorthy, Ireland. He seems to have married Elizabeth Reid at Belfast, c. 1834. In February 1836, McDonald enlisted in the 2nd/51st King’s Own Light Infantry Regiment. Before he joined the army, he had been working in Dublin as a slater.

His wife almost certainly accompanied him when McDonald’s regiment was posted to Van Diemen’s Land in December 1838. Their main duties in the colony concerned the supervision of convicts. The family was first stationed at "Malcolm’s Huts" near Richmond, then Port Arthur, before being sent to a more permanent posting at Green Ponds (now known as Kempton) in August 1839.

Elizabeth bore two children at Green Ponds. McDonald purchased his discharge from the army in 1842 and in 1847 joined other "over-straiters", taking his family to Victoria, where they settled on a small farming selection at Freshwater Creek, Duneed, south of Geelong. McDonald, and his son, William (junior), were among the first miners at the Break o’Day diggings during the Victorian gold rush. All members of the McDonald family eventually settled at Corindhap, the town which sprang up at Break o’Day.

It is believed that it is McDonald’s photograph (pictured), which was used as part of a photographic montage honouring the early explorers and settles of Victoria, titled, the Explorers and Early Colonists of Victoria, compiled by Thomas Chuck in 1872.

McDonald died from "general debility" at his son’s homestead at Corindhap on 6 June 1869. Elizabeth died 12 years later in 1881.
