= Mawallok =

Historic homestead in Victoria, Australia

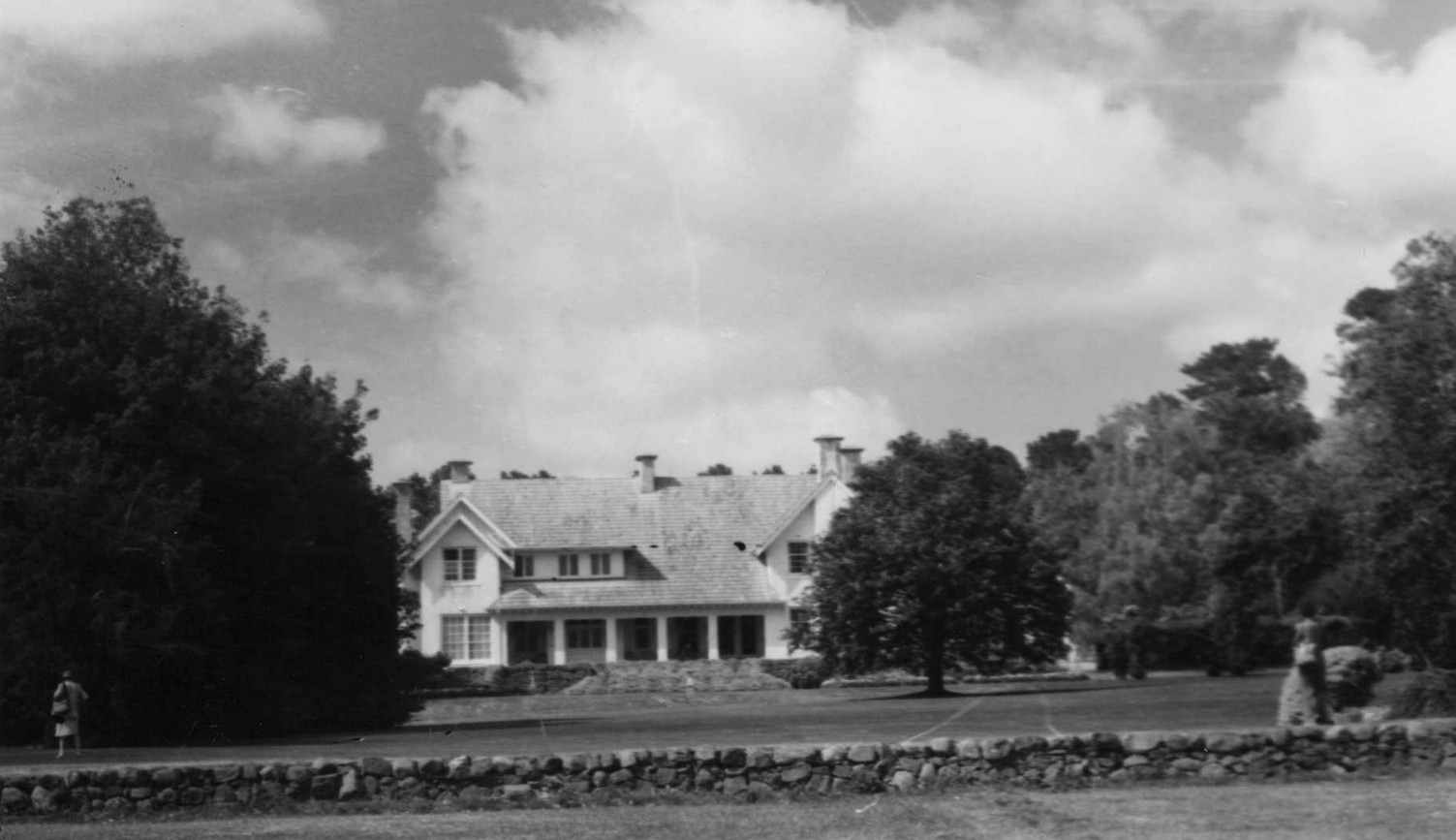
- Mawallok Homestead

- Location in Pyrenees Shire, Victoria
- 37°31′13″S 143°15′48″E
- Type: Homestead, associated built facilities and grounds
- Location: Stockyard Hill, Victoria, Australia
- Nearest city: Ararat

History
- Built: 1869 (original), 1908 (present homestead)
- Built for: Philip Russell

Site notes
- Architect(s): Klingender & Alsop
- Architectural styles: Arts and Crafts

Mawallok is a historic pastoral property in the locality of Stockyard Hill, between Skipton and Beaufort in western Victoria, Australia. As of 2017, the property comprised approximately 6,000 acres (2,430 ha). Established during the 1840s, it remained in ownership of the Russell family for 133 years before being purchased by Peter and Jocelyn Mitchell in 1980. Mawallok is noted for its pastoral history, its surviving nineteenth-century homestead complex, the Arts and Crafts homestead designed by Klingender & Alsop, gardens designed by William Guilfoyle, and a lake engineered by Sir John Monash.

== History ==
Mawallok originally formed part of the St Enoch's pastoral run, which was stocked by Thomas Steel and Richard Black in 1838. Following the subdivision of St Enoch's, the property was purchased in 1847 by Phillip Russell and the Reverend John Lillie, who held a grazing licence over approximately 20,000 acres (8,095 ha). Alexander Russell subsequently became sole proprietor and expanded the station, bringing sheep from Van Diemen's Land to join rams from Ercildoune. Mawallok became one of a number of substantial Western District pastoral properties owned by members of the Russell family, whose holdings also included Golf Hill, Barunah Plains, Wurrook, Leslie Manor, Carngham and Langi Willi. Other Russell family properties included Stoneleigh, Elderslie, Native Creek No. 2 and Langi Kal Kal.

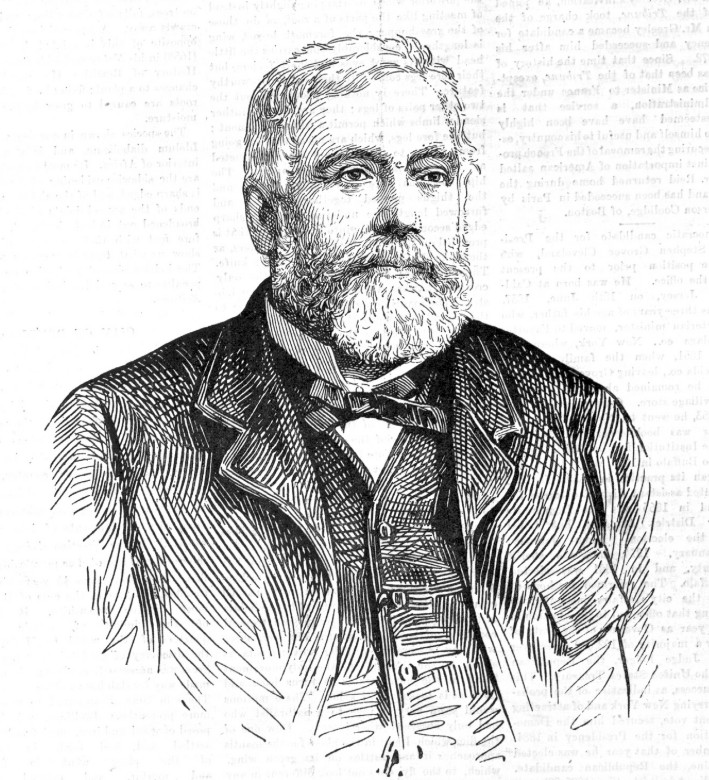
Phillip Russell

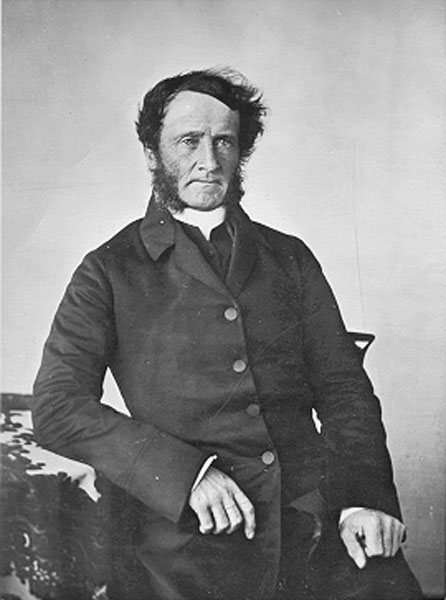
Rev. John Lillie

The station eventually grew to about 28,000 acres before later subdivision. The pre-emptive right to Mawallok was granted in 1858, by which time the first section of the homestead had been built together with a woolshed, stables, overseer's hut, sheep dip and two dams supplied by a natural spring reputed to be the third largest in Victoria. During the 1860s the original homestead was enlarged with a bluestone wing and cellar, while a bluestone coach house, stone and iron woolshed, meat house and other outbuildings were also established, many of which survive.

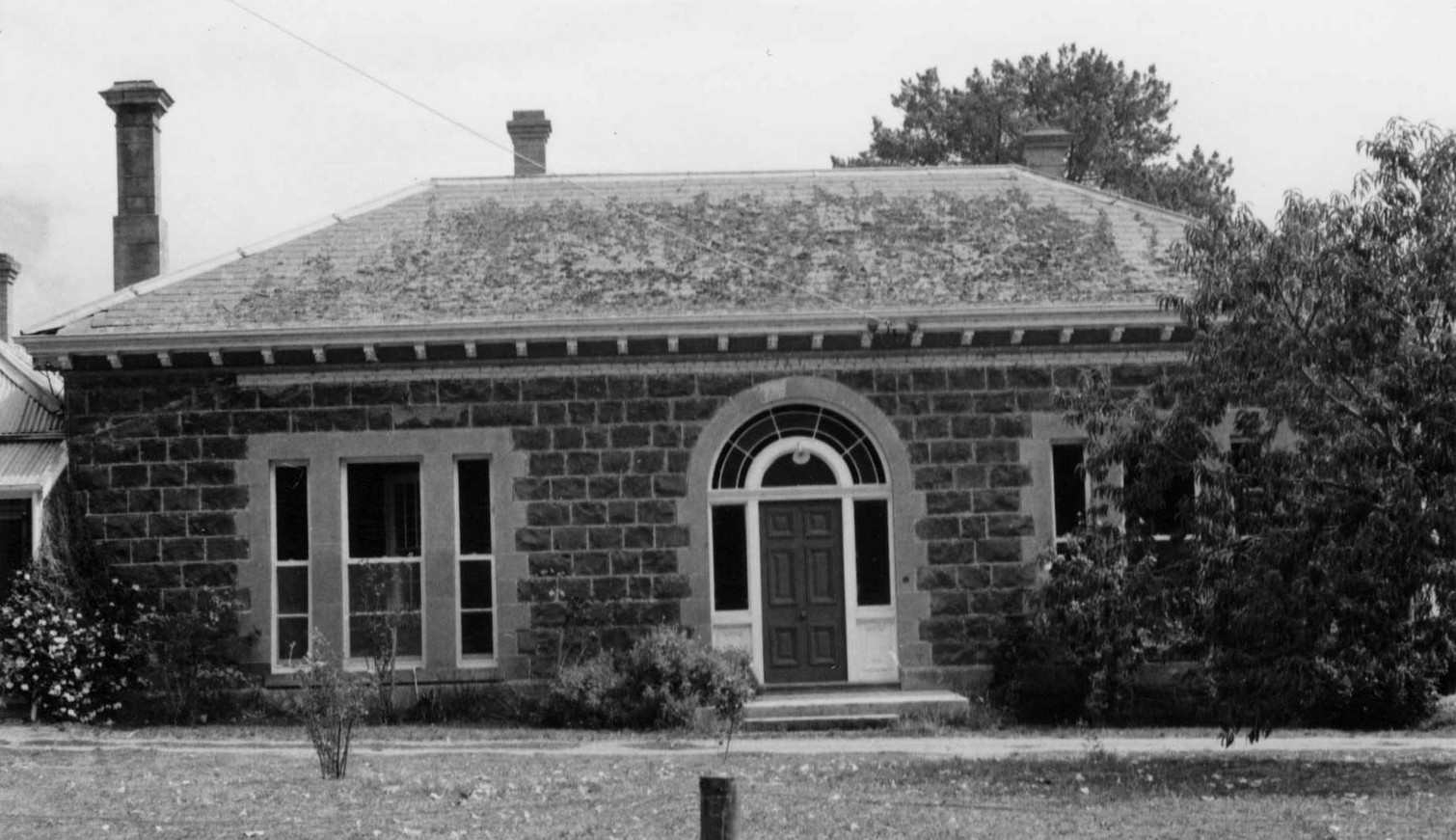
The original homestead, built 1869

Alexander Russell died in 1869 and the estate ultimately passed to his son Philip Russell, who assumed ownership in 1887 upon reaching the age of 21. Under the Russell family, Mawallok developed into one of Victoria's leading pastoral stations, carrying around 28,000 sheep. It became renowned for the quality of its Merino flock, together with its Shorthorn stud cattle and Friesian dairy herd.

Between 1907 and 1908 a new Arts and Crafts homestead was erected to the designs of architects Klingender & Alsop. Constructed in reinforced concrete, it represented an early domestic use of the material in Victoria. The asymmetrical residence features steep gables, dormer windows and tall chimneys, while its interior includes and Arts and Crafts timber staircase leading to a gallery overlooking the principal living room. Around 1909 William Guilfoyle, shortly before retiring as Director of Melbourne's Royal Botanic Gardens, prepared the design for the surrounding gardens. His landscape combined formal and informal elements, including sweeping lawns, curved and straight paths, shrubberies, terraces bluestone steps, pergolas, a rockery, pond, sundial, urns and en-tout-cas tennis courts, protected by extensive windbreaks and hedges.

Around 1927 Sir John Monash was commissioned to enlarge an existing dam into a 22-acre (8.9 ha) lake. A pump house and small shed were constructed in a style complementary to the homestead, while the elevated terrace was designed to overlook the lake towards Mount Cole and the Pyrenees Ranges.

Philip Russell's son, Alex Russell (MC) (1892–1961), moved to Mawallok with his wife Jess in 1932. A Cambridge-trained engineer, Russell served in both World Wars, was twice wounded on the Western Front during the First World War and was awarded the Military Cross. At Mawallok he further developed the station's Merino stud, whose sheep won numerous prizes, and served as president of the Australian Sheep Breeders' Association during the early 1950s. Russell was also a distinguished golfer, winning the 1924 Australian Open at Royal Melbourne before becoming a golf-course architect in partnership with Alister MacKenzie. Together they designed Royal Melbourne's East Course, Lake Karrinyup, Yarra Yarra and Paraparaumu Golf Club in New Zealand. At Mawallok he constructed a six-hole golf course for practice, while during the 1930s views from the homestead were improved by removing several Canary Island date palms from Guilfoyle's original design and constructing a ha-ha wall between the garden and golf course. The present ha-ha wall dates from 1937.

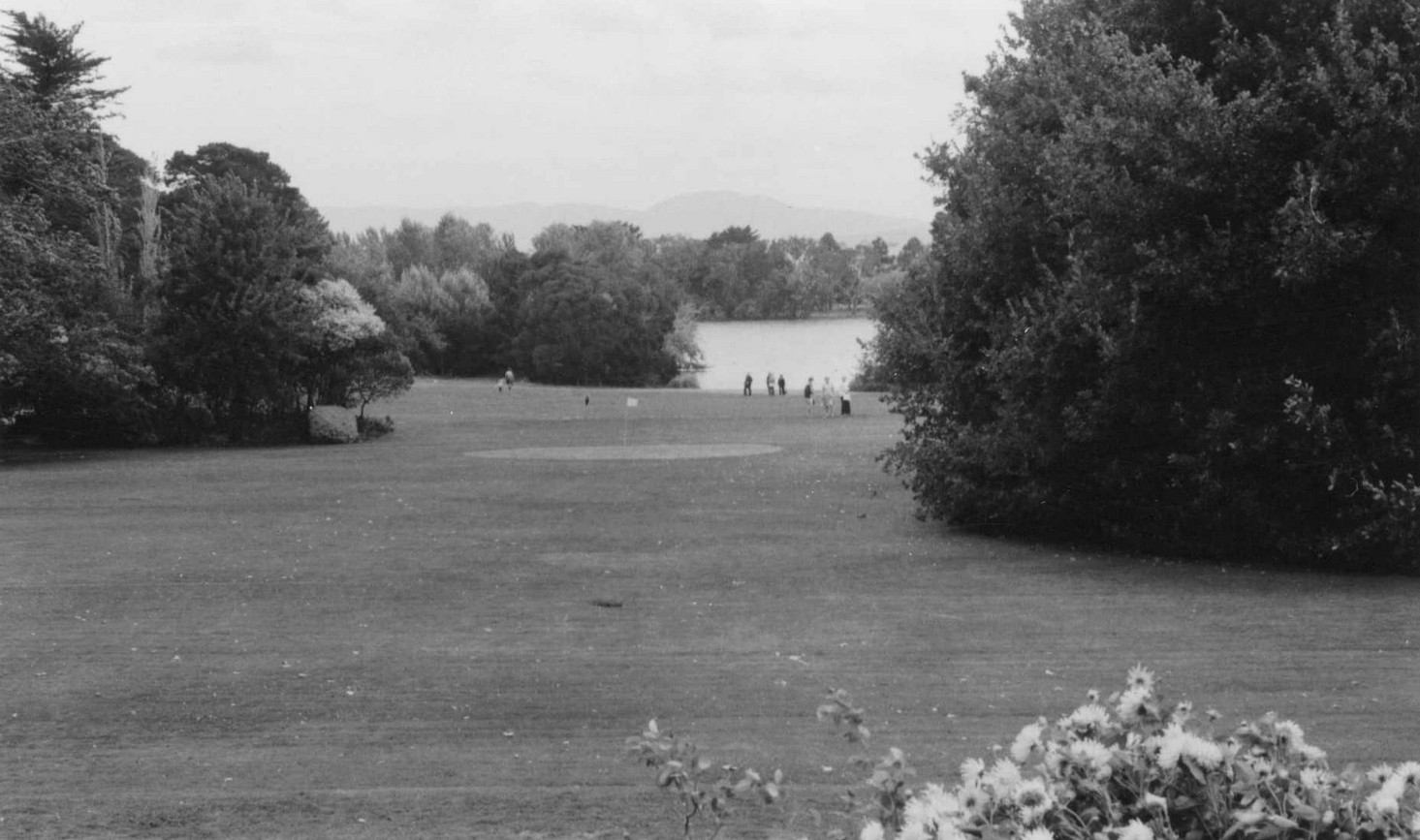
View of the golf course and lake

Prince Henry, Duke of Gloucester was to stay at Mawallok as part of his tour of Australia in 1934, but was slightly ill at the intended time of his visit, and subsequently did not attend a planned house party. The house party, which included prominent local residents, went ahead regardless.

Following the First World War, the Soldier Settlement Scheme substantially reduced Mawallok from approximately 28,000 acres to around 6,000 acres, although the homestead block remained intact. The original bluestone homestead, built in 1869, became the manager's residence, while the newer Arts and Crafts residence continued as the principal homestead. The estate retains more than 15 kilometres of dry stone walls, extensive hedges, pergolas and mature plantings, including English oak, Monterey cypress, ash, cedar, and an outstanding horse chestnut. Later alterations included a pleached lime walk designed by John Patrick in 1992 and the planting of a Chinese windmill palm by James Guilfoyle in 1996.

The Russell family retained ownership of Mawallok until 1980, spanning five generations and 133 years, when the property was purchased by Peter and Jocelyn Mitchell. Their son Stephen Mitchell acquired the property in 2013. By coincidence, his wife Serena is descended from the Russell family through her paternal grandmother. As of 2017, Mawallok carried approximately 100 Angus breeding cattle, 5,000 Dohne Merino ewes and their progeny, and 3,000 crossbred ewes, with around 15,000 sheep shorn annually.

Mawallok was sold in 2019 to Chinese wool importer Qingnan Wen, and subsequently approved by the Foreign Investment Review Board. Upon discovering the sale in a Herald Sun article, Senator Pauline Hanson, who disapproved of the sale, shared the article with the caption: "Dear Prime Minister, why did you allow this sale through?"

== See also ==
- Barunah Plains Homestead
- Langi Willi
