= Dereel =

Dereel Victoria
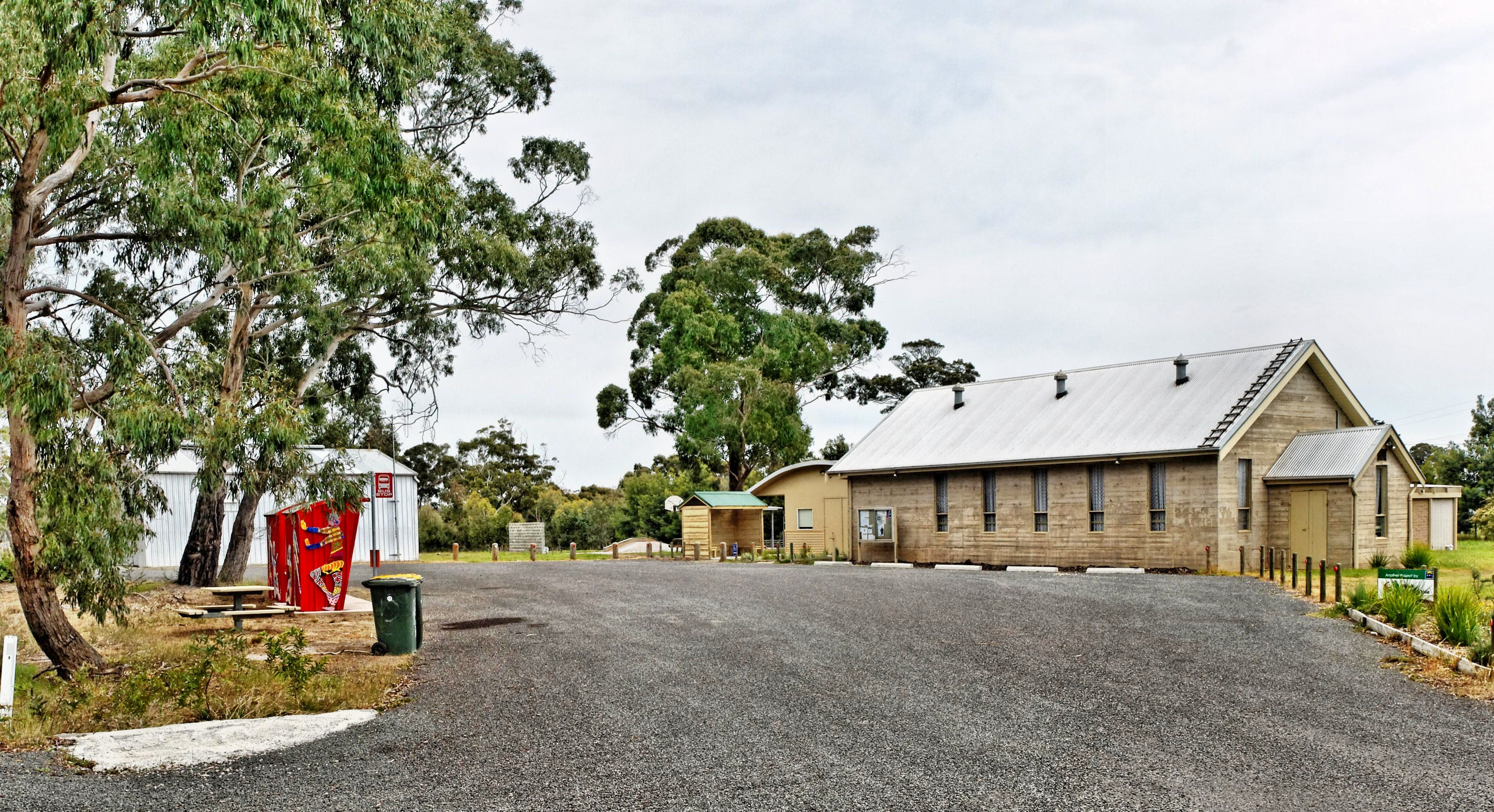
- Dereel Soldiers' Memorial Hall and CFA shed, October 2008

- Coordinates: 37°49′0″S 143°45′0″E
- Population: 533 (2016 census)
- Postcode(s): 3352
- Elevation: 348 m (1,142 ft)
- Location: 133 km (83 mi) W of Melbourne; 33 km (21 mi) S of Ballarat; 70 km (43 mi) N of Colac; 32 km (20 mi) N of Cressy
- LGA(s): Golden Plains Shire
- State electorate(s): Eureka
- Federal division(s): Ballarat
Localities around Dereel:
Berringa	Enfield	Grenville
Illabarook	Dereel	Mount Mercer
Rokewood Junction	Corindhap	Rokewood

Dereel is a town in the Western District of the Australian state of Victoria. At the 2016 census, Dereel and the surrounding area had a population of 533.

It is located on the Ballarat-Colac Road, 33 kilometres (21 mi) from Ballarat and 70 kilometres (43 mi) from Colac. There is no clearly defined town centre, though the Dereel Soldiers' Memorial Hall, located on Swamp Road, is commonly considered as the town centre.

Dereel Post Office opened on 1 November 1868 and closed in 1971.

Dereel includes a large wetlands area, referred to as the "Swamp" or "Lagoon". In recent years it is almost dry.

On 27 March 2013, a bushfire at Dereel destroyed 16 houses and 18 sheds. The fire covered 1,300 hectares (3,212 acres).
