= Corindhap =

Corindhap Victoria
- Coordinates: 37°53′0″S 143°44′0″E
- Population: 131 (SAL 2021)
- Postcode(s): 3352
- Location: 143 km (89 mi) W of Melbourne; 40 km (25 mi) S of Ballarat; 25 km (16 mi) N of Cressy
- LGA(s): Golden Plains Shire
- State electorate(s): Polwarth
- Federal division(s): Ballarat
Localities around Corindhap:
Rokewood Junction	Dereel	Dereel
Rokewood Junction	Corindhap	Dereel; Rokewood
Rokewood	Rokewood	Rokewood

Corindhap is a town in the Australian state of Victoria located on the Ballarat-Colac Road, 38.9 km from Ballarat and 62.9 km from Colac. Formerly known as Break O'Day.

== History ==
The town was established in 1852 after gold was found at Boundary Hill. By 1857 the town had grown to 5000 people. There were "...four hotels, three bakers, three tailors, two blacksmiths, two drapers, four butchers, two bootmakers, two grocers, two general storekeepers, a tobacconist and numerous "grog shanties". There was an Oddfellows' Hall, two churches and a school. The town even had a brass band..." The Post Office, opened on 25 January 1868, was known as Break O'Day until 1876, and closed in 1993.

A number of the early miners of the district stayed on as farmers. Amongst these was the McDonald family. William, a decommissioned soldier, and his son, William (junior), were some of the first miners at the Break O’Day diggings and remained as settlers in Corindhap.

== Today ==
With a present population about 100, Corindhap has a pub, a church, a hall, an oval and a wide variety of homes. It has an Australian rules football team in conjunction with the neighbouring township of Rokewood. It previously competed in the Lexton Plains Football League, but the league folded at the end of the 2010 season. The team now play in the Central Highlands Football League.
