= Janet Biddlecombe =

Australian pastoralist and philanthropist (1866–1954)

- Janet Biddlecombe by Matt Webb
- Born: Janet Russell; 24 April 1866; Melbourne
- Died: 15 February 1954 (aged 87); Shelford, Victoria
- Known for: pastoralist and phoilantropist
- Spouse: John Biddlecombe
- Children: none

Janet Biddlecombe (24 April 1866 – 15 February 1954) was an Australian pastoralist and philanthropist.

== Life ==
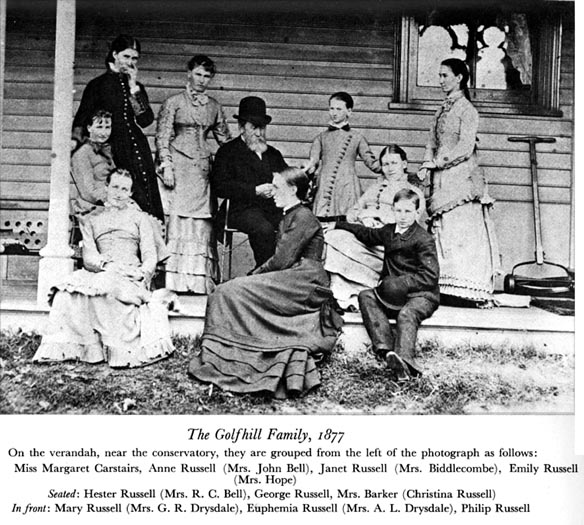
Janet, her parents and her six sisters and brother in 1877 at Golf Hill

Biddlecombe was born in 1866 in Melbourne. Her parents were Euphemia Leslie (born Carstairs) and George Russell and she was the last of their eight children. She had only one brother and her mother died when she was young. Her father was a pastoralist. Golf Hill Station at Shelford in Victoria state had been established in 1836 on the banks of a river. In 1839, her father bought land from the crown to build a home and move his HQ to Shelford. Most of the local squatters and her parents had come from Scotland so the town had a strong Presbyterian feel. The small town expanded as her father rented out space for new businesses. Shelford had two schools by 1853.

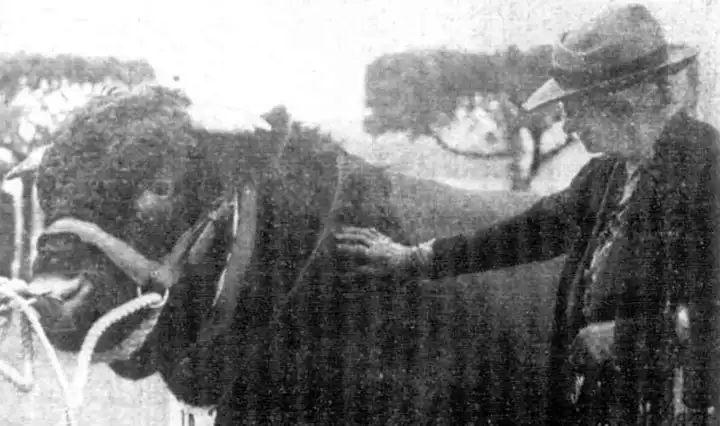
Janet Biddlecombe and one of her bulls

In 1888 her father died, and after two years Biddlecombe started to manage the Golf Hill station taking over from her brother. This was a task, as the station was not profitable. However she wanted to preserve her families work and she had sisters. In 1890 Matthew William Webb exhibited a portrait of her. That painting is now in the State Library of Victoria.

She married Commander John Biddlecombe who had been in the British Navy in 1900. Her new husband became the station's manager. He died in 1929 and they had won many prizes for their cattle. The two of them had created a stud for Hereford cattle and she continued as a widow. Her station was managed by men but if necessary she would intercede.

The prize winning bulls were all sold in 1953 in the hope that they would improve Australian bloodlines. The sale raised a substantial sum and Biddlescombe donated it to charity in. Janet, who was then a childless widow, died in 1954.

== Death and legacy ==
Biddlecombe died in 1954 at Golf Hill near Shelford, Victoria. Her body was not allowed to be buried at Golf Hill but her ashes were cast there. She had a small funeral as her family had died, although several organisations sent representatives in gratitude for her generosity. The philanthropy was largely unknown in her lifetime even though it was her own money that she was donating. The gifts came from the proceeds of her success in business. Several buildings were named after her. She left the contents of her house including her paintings to the National Gallery of Victoria and the Geelong Art Gallery.
