= Shelford, Victoria =

Shelford
- Town
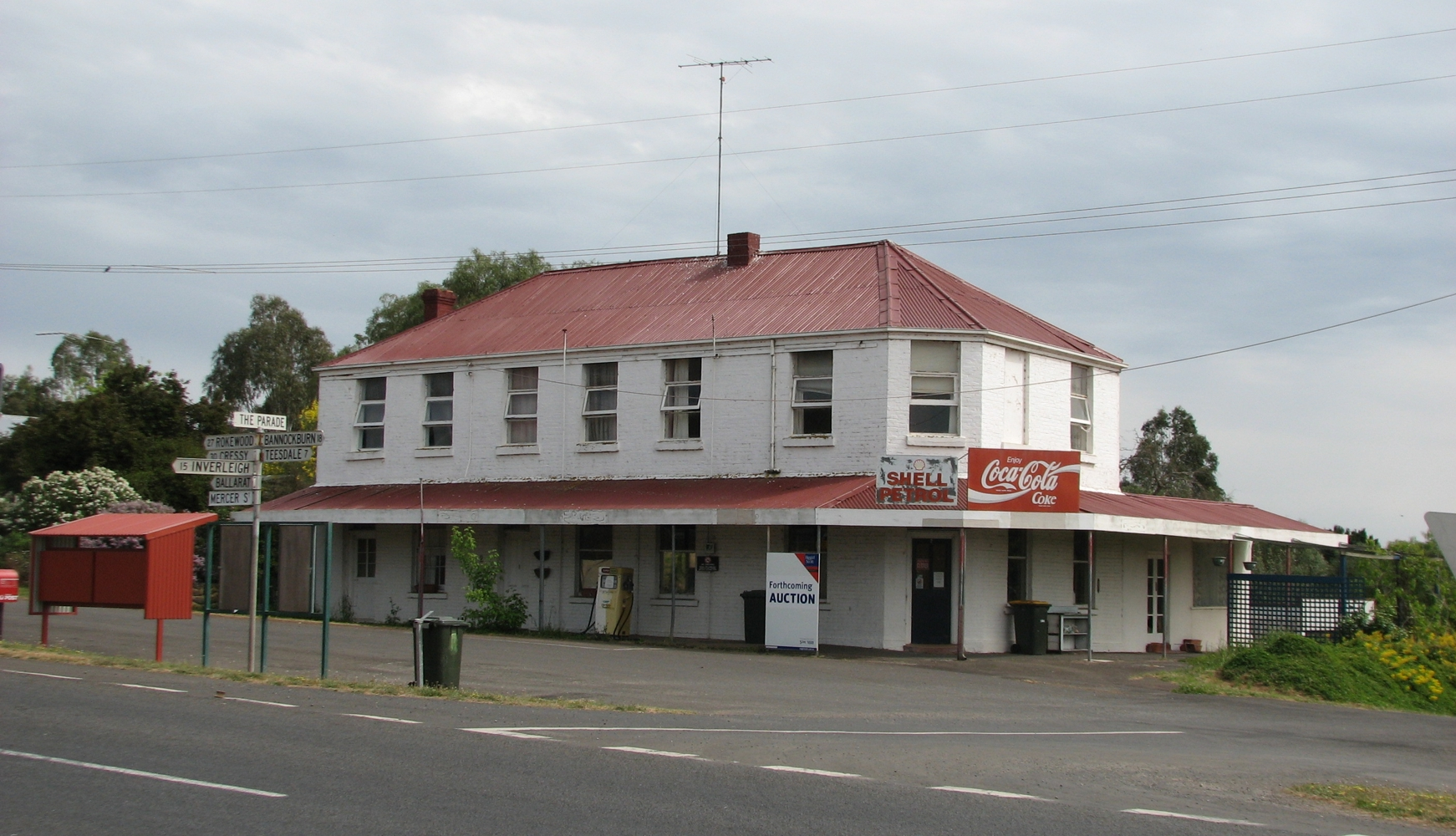
- Former general store

- Coordinates: 38°01′0″S 143°58′0″E
- Country: Australia
- State: Victoria
- LGA: Golden Plains Shire
- Location: 106 km (66 mi) W of Melbourne; 42 km (26 mi) W of Geelong; 18 km (11 mi) W of Bannockburn

Government
  - State electorate: Polwarth
  - Federal division: Ballarat

Population
  - Total: 253 (2016 census)
- Postcode: 3329
Localities around Shelford
Mount Mercer; Rokewood	Mount Mercer	Meredith
Rokewood; Barunah Park	Shelford	Bamganie; Teesdale
Hesse	Inverleigh	Inverleigh

Shelford is a town in Victoria, Australia. The locality is in the Golden Plains Shire near the regional city of Geelong and 106 kilometres (66 mi) west of the state capital, Melbourne.

Shelford is nestled in a valley divided by the Leigh River, Golf Hill Station was established in 1836 on the river banks. In 1839 George Russell bought land from the crown to move his HQ to there. Most of the local squatters came from Scotland so the town had a strong Presbyterian feel and had two churches. The Post Office opened on 1 July 1847 with the town names The Leigh which was renamed Shelford in 1854. By 1865 the town had a court house, post office, a mechanics institute and two hotels. In 1874 the Shelford Bridge was constructed using iron imported from Liverpool.

In about 1890 Janet Biddlecombe started to manage the Golf Hill station taking over from her brother. She married in 1900 and her new husband became the manager. The two of them ran a stud for Hereford cows. The prize winning bulls were all sold in aid of charity in 1953. Janet, then a childless widow, died in 1954,

The town was never large; in the 1930s the town had a population of 130 persons. After the Second World War some larger land holding were carved up for a soldier settlement scheme. Sixty-nine farms covering 45,000 acres were sold off to returning servicemen and their families.

In 1994 the Post Office became a Licensed Post Office, and has since closed; the date of closure is unknown.

== Heritage listed sites ==
Shelford contains a number of heritage listed sites, including:

- 1372 Rokewood-Shelford Road, Leigh Shire Hall and Toll House
- Shelford-Bannockburn Road, Leigh River Iron Bridge
- 1716 Bannockburn-Shelford Road, Shelford Presbyterian Church

== Shelford Today ==
Shelford today still has a Recreation Reserve where the Shelford Cricket Club play their home games and the Recreation Reserve has tennis courts and a basketball court as well. Shelford also has a Primary School and a Town Hall.
