= Leslie Manor =

Historic homestead in Victoria, Australia

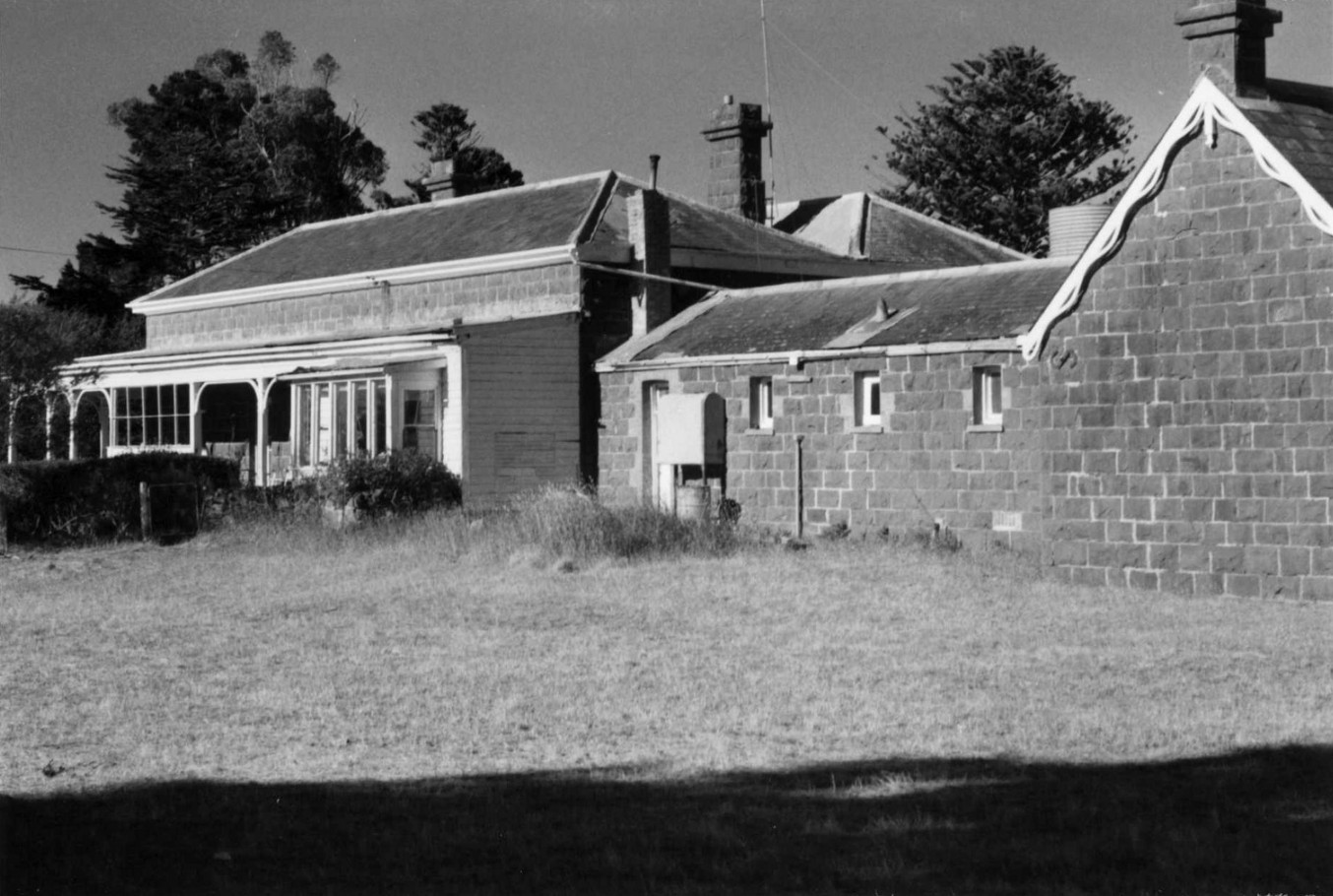
- Leslie Manor, 1979

- Location in the Corangamite Shire, Victoria
- 38°08′05″S 143°22′43″E
- Type: Homestead, associated built facilities and grounds
- Location: Leslie Manor, Victoria, Australia
- Nearest city: Colac

History
- Built: 1845
- Built for: John Hastie

Site notes
- Architectural style: Victorian

Victorian Heritage Register
- Official name: Leslie Manor
- Type: State heritage (built and natural)
- Designated: 19 March 1970
- Reference no.: 67825

Leslie Manor is a historic pastoral homestead near Camperdown, Victoria, Australia. Established as a pastoral run, it is centred on a bluestone homestead constructed in 1845 and retains an extensive collection of nineteenth-century outbuildings. Originally known as "Punpundhal", the estate later became known as Leslie Manor and is recognised for its association with the pastoral development of the region and the Clyde Company pastoral network. The homestead complex is listed by the National Trust of Australia (Victoria).

== History ==
The property now known as Leslie Manor originated as the pastoral run "Punpundhal", which was taken up in 1841 by John Hastie and Samuel Proudfoot Hawkins during the rapid expansion of grazing settlement across Victoria's Western District. Situated near Lake Corangamite, the run formed part of a broader pattern of occupation in which large areas of Crown land were claimed by pastoralists seeking grazing country for sheep and cattle. Hawkins subsequently departed the property in 1844 to establish interests elsewhere, while Hastie remained in sole occupation.

In 1845 Hastie constructed the bluestone homestead that remains the centrepiece of the estate today. Built in the Early Victorian style, the residence was accompanied by a substantial collection of service buildings, including stables, a blacksmith's shop, gardeners' cottages and a manager's residence.

Hastie remained at Punpundhal for more than two decades. During this period, the property developed as a substantial grazing station, until his death in March 1866, when the estate was offered for sale and entered a new phase of ownership.

On 26 February 1867 the property was purchased by George Russell, one of the most prominent pastoralists in colonial Victoria. Russell named the estate "Leslie Manor" in honour of his wife, Euphemia Leslie Russell, who died only a week after the purchase was completed. The acquisition linked the property to the extensive pastoral interests associated with Russell and the Clyde Company. The estate remained within the Russell family's ownership for more than half a century, although much of this period was spent under lease arrangements following Russell's death in 1888.

A major turning point occurred in 1922 when, after 55 years of Russell ownership, Leslie Manor was acquired by Australian Farms Pty. Ltd. as part of a large-scale purchase of several Victorian pastoral properties. At the time of the sale, livestock, horses, equipment and household contents associated with the station were dispersed through a clearing sale.

The subdivision of Leslie Manor became notable for its association with retired British military officers. Approximately 60 farms were created from the former estate, and many of the new holdings were allocated to former officers who had served in British regiments in India. By 1923, more than 20 officers had settled on farms carved from the original estate. Because roads, fencing and accommodation were initially lacking, many of the settlers temporarily resided in the Leslie Manor Homestead itself, while others occupied tents and outbuildings.

Following subdivision, the homestead block remained intact and passed through a succession of owners, including members of the Anderson, Pott, Wilson, Stansfield and McIvor families. While the surrounding landscape changed through the creation of smaller farms, Leslie Manor continued to operate as a grazing property. During the post-World War II decades, the estate developed a reputation for fine-wool production.

In 1997, the property was purchased by Dan and Patrice O'Brien. Additional land was subsequently acquired, increasing the size of the holding. The homestead's associated buildings have survived largely intact into the late twentieth century to the present, including a rare ha-ha wall.

In June 2025, the original homestead was significantly gutted by a fire, resulting in the destruction of the possessions inside. There was no one at the homestead at the time, and it was deemed "not suspicious".
