= Mount Mercer =

- Town
- Coordinates: 37°49′0″S 143°49′0″E
- Country: Australia
- State: Victoria
- LGA: Golden Plains Shire

Government
  - State electorate: Buninyong
  - Federal division: Ballarat
- Elevation: 380 m (1,250 ft)

Population
  - Total: 94 (SAL 2021)
- Postcode: 3352
Localities around Mount Mercer
Enfield	Grenville	Cargerie
Dereel	Mount Mercer	Meredith
Rokewood	Rokewood; Shelford	Shelford

Mount Mercer is a locality in the Western District of the Australian state of Victoria. It is named after a nearby scoria cone with crater. The scoria cone was developed on a broad lava shield and the rim of the cone is asymmetric, being higher around the south and open towards the north. The scoria cone is approximately 400m in diameter and of circular shape. It is sufficiently enclosed to contain a swamp and has been partly excavated for a reservoir. It stands approximately 75m above the surrounding area.

One of Victoria's larger wind farms, the Mount Mercer Wind Farm became fully operational in September 2014.

== History ==
Mount Mercer School No. 715 opened on 21 March 1864 as a Methodist school under the Board of Education, with Donald Murray as head teacher and an average attendance of 27 pupils. It later came under the Education Department, which purchased the school site and schoolhouse in 1874. The original wooden schoolhouse was designed for 70 pupils. The school closed and reopened several times; it closed in December 1902, reopened at an unrecorded date, closed again in December 1917 and reopened in October 1919. A new two-classroom building was recorded in 1907. The school site and improvements were sold in 1963.

In 1898, a newspaper correspondent reported that a large billiard saloon was being built and a new boarding house was expected to open, as the existing accommodation, referred to as “Mr Skene’s”, was said to be insufficient for visitors and new arrivals. The correspondent also anticipated that the Mount Mercer mining company’s operations would bring more employment and lead to consideration of public buildings, including a state school.
