= Glenfine =

Historic homestead in Victoria, Australia

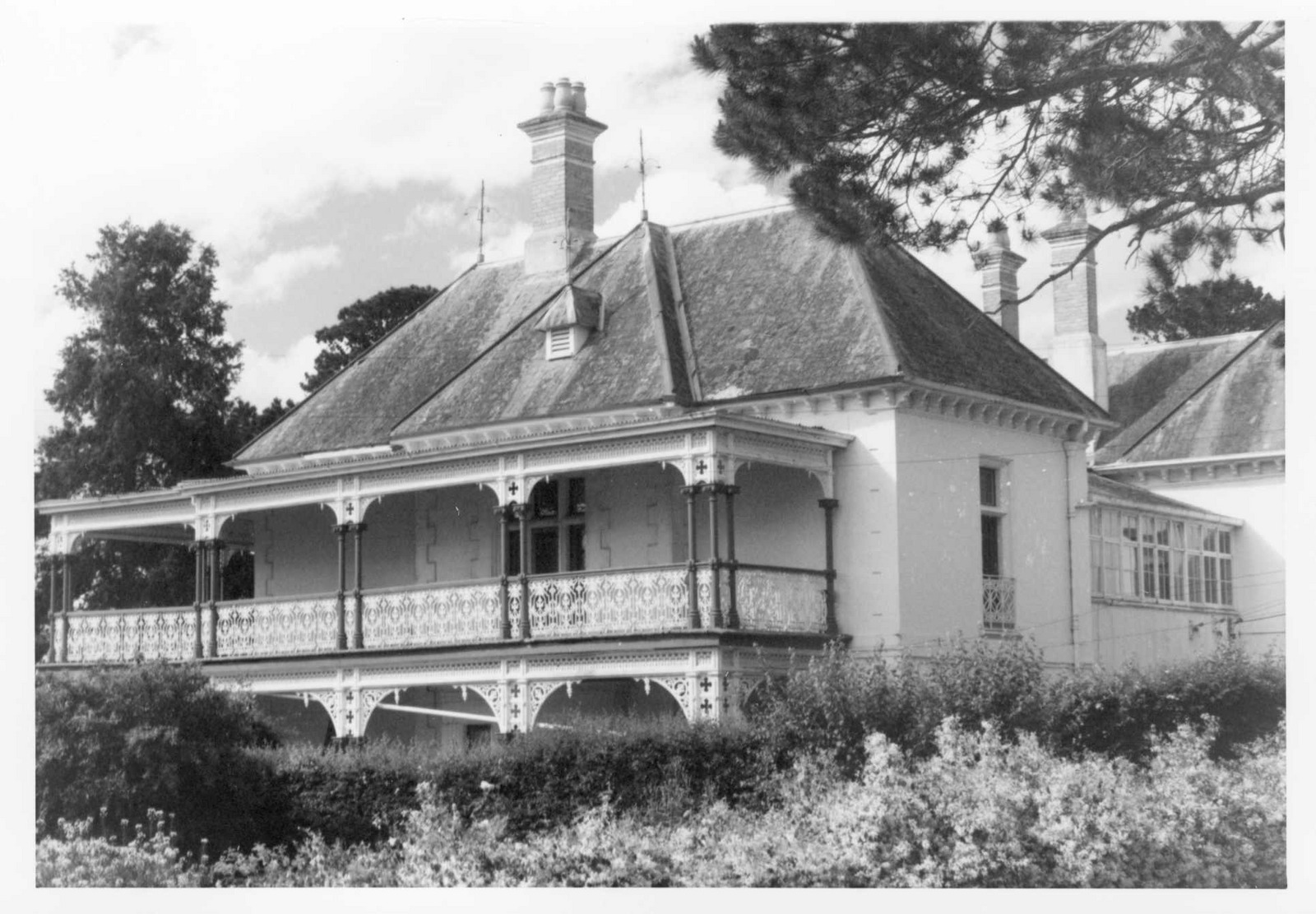
- Glenfine Homestead, November 7, 1976

- Location in Golden Plains Shire, Victoria
- 37°52′9.5″S 143°35′0.3″E
- Type: Homestead, associated built facilities and grounds
- Location: Cape Clear, Victoria, Australia
- Nearest city: Ballarat

History
- Built: 1873
- Built for: William Thomas Rowe

Site notes
- Architect: H.R. Caselli
- Architectural style: Victorian Gothic

Victorian Heritage Register
- Official name: Glenfine Homestead Precinct
- Type: State heritage (built and natural)
- Designated: 24 October 1996
- Reference no.: H1206

Glenfine is an historic homestead located at 150 Glenfine Road, Werneth, 41.7 km south-west of Ballarat, in the Golden Plains Shire, Victoria, Australia. Adjacent to the gothic-style homestead are the remains of the Glenfine South gold mine, and the site of the former mining township of Hollybush. Constructed in 1873 for pastoralist William Thomas Rowe and designed by architect H. R. Caselli, the homestead is a substantial two-storey rendered bluestone residence featuring a slate roof, cast-iron verandahs, and a glazed conservatory. The precinct is historically significant for its association with Victorian pastoral development, gold mining in the late 19th and early 20th centuries, and the creation of a private township to accommodate mine workers.

== History ==
The Glenfine run was originally settled in 1833 by Thomas Downie, a Scottish migrant. Ownership subsequently passed to Thomas Chirnside in 1848, and then to his older brother Dr. John Chirnside in 1853, who operated the property as a horse stud. William Thomas Rowe purchased the property in 1857, using it as a pastoral estate. Only a few blocks of stone and some trees remain of the original homestead that these original property owners lived in.

The two-storey bluestone homestead was designed by architect H. R. Caselli in 1872 and constructed around 1873, with later additions to the north-west wing also by Caselli. Architectural features include a steeply pitched slate roof, bracketed eaves, wrap-around verandahs with paired cast-iron columns, and an attached glazed conservatory. Ancillary structures near the homestead include a stone dairy wall, a stone store, and a timber cook's cottage.

Historical records suggest that large trees surrounding the homestead may date back to an earlier 1870s garden depicted in a painting by William Tibbits, although the original design no longer survives.

=== Gold mining and the township of Hollybush ===
Gold was discovered on the Glenfine property in the late 19th century, leading to the development of the Glenfine South Mine, which operated from 1897 to 1908. The mine combined deep-lead and quartz extraction and was equipped with a forty-head stamping battery, a rare configuration in Victorian mining history. To accommodate mine workers, William Rowe (junior) created the private township of Hollybush, which by 1900 had a population of approximately 426, including a store, boarding houses, and over twenty cottages. The township declined as mining activity ceased, with the population dropping to 27 by 1921.

=== Later use ===
The Glenfine property, alongside farming, has been subject to modern gold exploration, including drilling and joint-venture mining projects targeting the historic Glenfine Dome.

== See also ==
- Werribee Park
