= Rokewood =

- Town
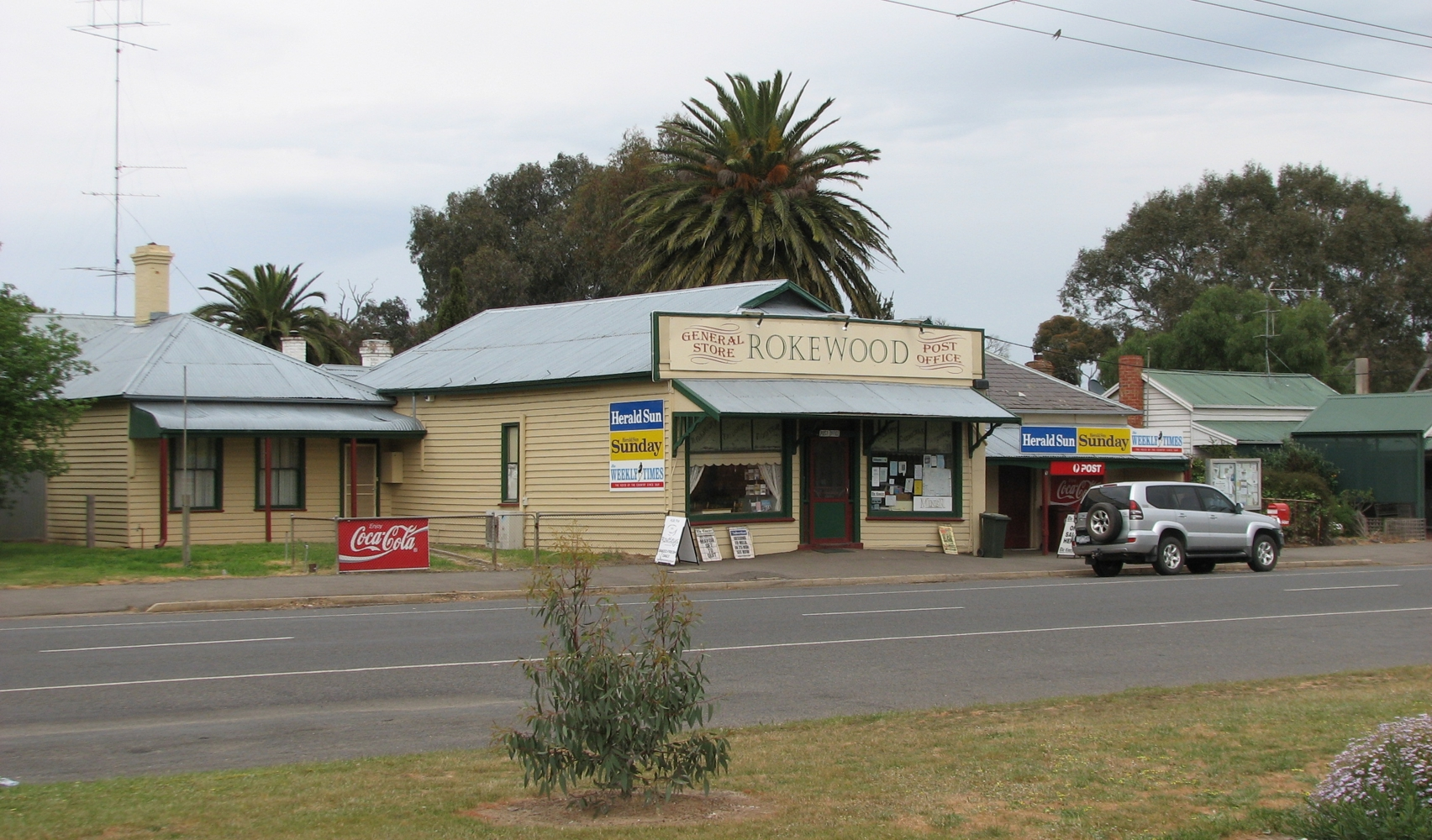
- General store

- Coordinates: 37°54′0″S 143°43′0″E
- Country: Australia
- State: Victoria
- LGA: Golden Plains Shire
- Location: 133 km (83 mi) W of Melbourne; 69 km (43 mi) NW of Geelong; 44 km (27 mi) S of Ballarat

Government
  - State electorate: Polwarth
  - Federal division: Ballarat

Population
  - Total: 208 (2021 census)
- Postcode: 3330
Localities around Rokewood
Rokewood Junction	Corindhap; Dereel	Mount Mercer
Werneth	Rokewood	Shelford
Cressy	Barunah Park	Barunah Park

Rokewood is a town in Golden Plains Shire, Victoria, Australia located 133 kilometres (83 mi) west of the state capital, Melbourne. At the 2021 census, Rokewood had a population of 208.

== History ==
Rokewood Post Office opened on 1 October 1857.

The closed Rokewood Uniting Church (formerly Presbyterian Church) was constructed between 1865-1866 to designs of Alexander Davidson, and is heritage-listed.

McMillans Bridge, which crosses the Woady Yaloak River for the Rokewood-Skipton Road between Rokewood and Werneth, is listed on the Victorian Heritage Register.

== Attractions ==
Rokewood Swimming Lagoon is an unusual community-run public waterhole in the centre of Rokewood. It is open from December to March each year.

== Sport ==
In conjunction with its neighbouring township Corindhap, Rokewood has an Australian Rules football and netball team, Rokewood-Corindhap. It previously competed in the Lexton Plains Football League, but the league folded at the end of the 2010 season. The team now play in the Central Highlands Football League.

Golfers play at the course of the Rokewood Golf Club on Rokewood–Shelford Road.

== See also ==
- Kuruc-A-Ruc
- Wurrook
