= Barunah Plains Homestead =

Homestead in Australia

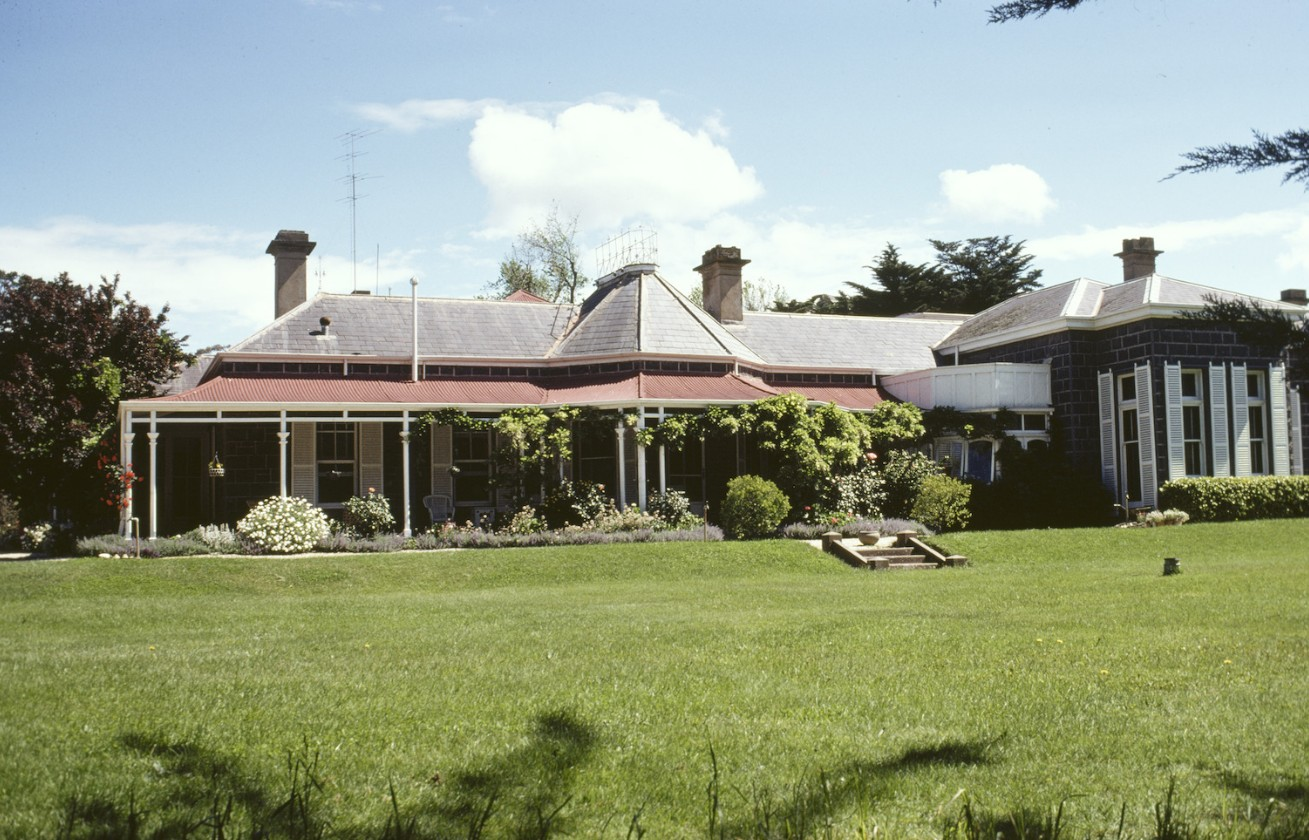
- Barunah Plains Homestead

- Location in Golden Plains Shire, Victoria
- 38°04′01″S 143°52′25″E
- Type: Homestead, associated built facilities and grounds
- Location: Derrinallum, Victoria, Australia
- Nearest city: Hesse

History
- Built: 1866 (later additions)
- Built for: Thomas and Philip Russell

Site notes
- Architect(s): Alexander Davidson and George Henderson
- Architectural style: Victorian Gothic

Victorian Heritage Register
- Official name: Barunah Plains Homestead
- Type: State heritage (built and natural)
- Designated: 9 June 1960
- Reference no.: B1126

Barunah Plains Homestead is a heritage-listed homestead at 4484 Hamilton Highway, Hesse, Victoria, Australia. The original house, which was designed by architects Davidson and Henderson, dates from 1866. Additions and alterations were made in the late nineteenth century and in the 1900s-1910s. The homestead also comprises large formal gardens, a bakehouse and laundry, stables, coach-house and implement shed (south-west of the homestead), a woolshed, two bluestone cottages north-east of the homestead, and a ram shed located a kilometre south.

The property is strongly associated with the grazing history of the Western District and, prior to subdivision for soldier settlement in 1946, was the largest sheep station in Victoria. The homestead and outbuildings were listed on the Register of the National Estate on 14 May 1991. They are also classified by the National Trust of Australia and protected under the Golden Plains Shire Heritage Overlay.

== History ==
The run on which the homestead sits was originally named The Long Waterhole. It was settled by Thomas Austin in 1846, who established a merino sheep stud. It was sold to brothers Thomas and Philip Russell in 1851, who renamed the property Barunah Plains. In 2000, The Weekly Times reported that the Barunah Plains wool stud "has provided the genetic base for many of Australia's leading fine wool studs". At its peak, the station held over 50,000 sheep and was the largest sheep station in the state. It remained in the Russell family until 1978.

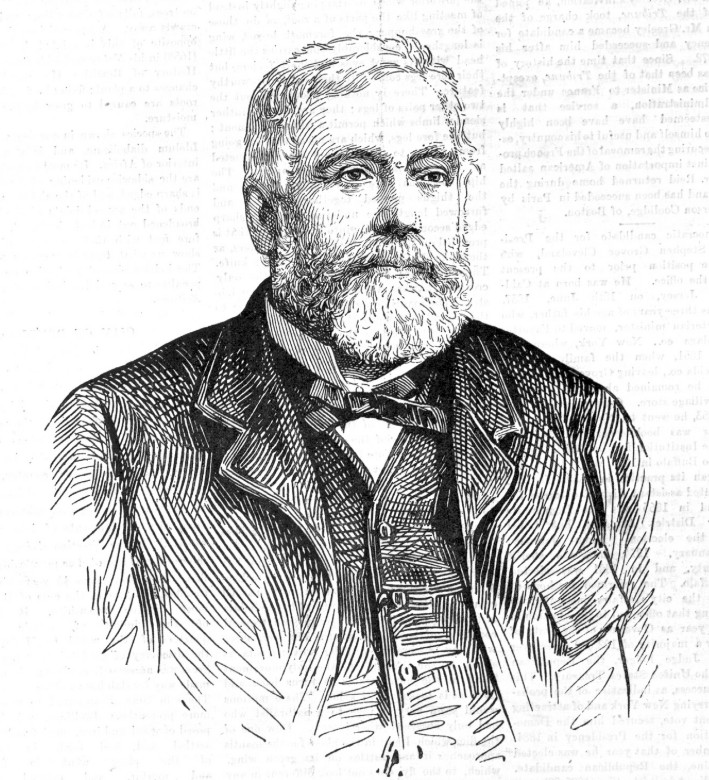
Phillip Russell

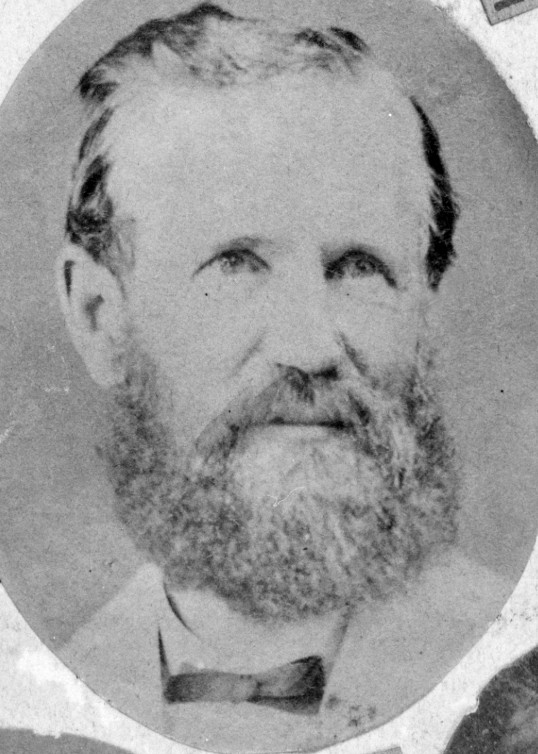
Thomas Russell

Graham Mills bought the property from the Russell family in 1978, and subsequently restored the homestead and surrounds. In the early 1990s, GW Mills and sons decided that they needed an alternative source of income to supplement their wool business, and opened the property as tourist accommodation, using parts of the homestead, two cottages and the former shearers' quarters. In 1995, Mills added a 9-hole golf course, using the shearers' quarters as a clubhouse. The clubhouse was ranked by BRW as the fifth-best in Victoria in 1998, and was then in the process of expansion. In that year, the property had 11,000 sheep, crops of wheat, barley and oats, and the tourist business. In 1998, the local council approved plans to create a country-club development, motel and conference centre at the site, but that did not eventuate.

In 1999, part of the property was sold when the owners were unable to sell it as a whole. It was bought by internet entrepreneur and politician Evan Thornley in 2001. He advertised the property for sale in 2012, at which time the Geelong Advertiser reported that potential buyers were visiting the property "in helicopters that cost almost half the property's $4.5 million-plus asking price."

Damian Canny purchased Barunah Plains from Evan Thornley, taking possession on 20 January 2016.

== Significance ==
Barunah Plains is a late-nineteenth century homestead complex, exhibiting a rich array of cultural features. They include a collection of bluestone buildings comprising the homestead and outbuildings; and a homestead garden and parkland with a large attractively crafted timber gate, a timber pedestrian bridge, shrubberies, a sunken croquet lawn, a rose garden and mature trees (Criterion A.3).

Barunah Plains has a strong and long association with the grazing history of the Western District, and thus with a major chapter of the history of Victoria (Criterion A.4).

The range of structures on the property, including bakery, laundry, cottages, implement shed, stables, coach house, woolshed and ram building, is important for the way it reflects a functioning Western District sheep property founded in the nineteenth century. Additionally, the ram shed, and the gate providing entry to the garden and park, are unusual features. The garden is also important as an example of the gardenesque style, exhibiting the following characteristics: a dominance of shrubberies with minimal lawn area, the use of gravel paths, and the planting of trees with a distinctive form as features (Criterion B.2).

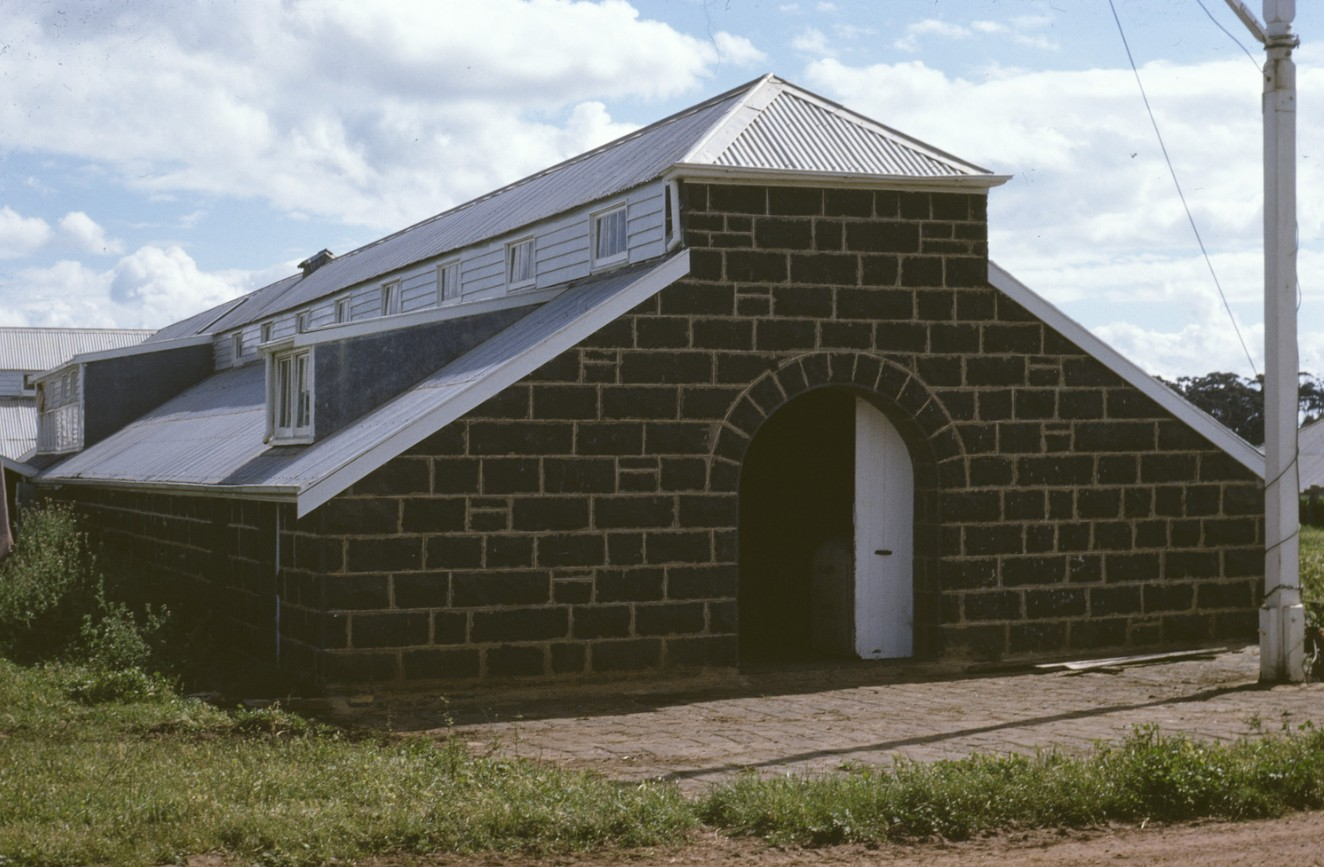
Barunah Plains Homestead woolshed

Barunah Plains is important for technical and creative excellence exhibited in the evolved form of the bluestone house, the collection of substantial bluestone outbuildings, and in the 1890s garden design (Criterion F.1).

== Description ==
Barunah Plains is on the Hamilton Highway at Hesse, and was established in the 1840s. Philip Russell, with John Simson and Thomas Russell, took over the property in 1851 and, from 1856, Thomas, with other Russell family members, owned the property. Barunah Plains remained in Russell family hands until 1978.

The oldest section of the homestead, comprising the main rooms, dates from 1866, and was designed by architects, Davidson and Henderson, who designed a number of homesteads and other buildings in that part of Victoria. Additions were made later in the nineteenth century and major additions and alterations date from the 1900s to the 1910s. Those early twentieth century developments included the western wing with its polygonal window, filling-in of the central courtyard to create an enormous lantern-lit room with two fireplaces, and refitting of parts of the older house, such as leadlights in the front door surround. The dates of the various outbuildings are unknown. In 1904, it was stated that the Barunah Plains Merino flock was "the most noted in the western district", comprising 50,000 sheep on the 51,000 acres (21,000 hectares). The ram building is one unusual manifestation of the once very large sheep property, allegedly the largest in Victoria when it was subdivided for soldier settlement in 1946.

Barunah Plains homestead is a large, single-storey bluestone residence, comprising two main sections forming a U-shape around a rear courtyard, which was in-filled in the 1900s to the 1910s. The eastern section of the building was constructed in 1866 to Davidson and Henderson's design. That section is asymmetrically composed, with a cast iron verandah at the north-east corner. The present front door faces east, and is beside a projecting bay window and sheltered by a stone porch. That section may be an addition. The north side elevation has a projecting bay-windowed room with a higher roof, crowned by cast iron cresting. Further west is the 1900s to the 1910s wing, comprising principal bedrooms and intact bathrooms. On the western side of the old courtyard is a bluestone section, reputed to be the oldest part, and a timber section.

Immediately south of the rear of the house is the bluestone bakehouse and laundry. Further south again are the bluestone and timber station buildings, stables, coach house and implement shed, arranged to form a large courtyard. The garden encloses the homestead on the south, east, north and part of the west sides. Separating the garden and station outbuildings is a picket fence, which is the last surviving section of a fence which was more extensive.

The garden has a layout dating from at least the 1890s and has much mature planting. The garden originally extended to the other side of the Warrambine Creek, but became badly overgrown. Warrambine Creek runs along the north side of the garden, and a sunken croquet lawn is just north-east of the house. The garden has two hectares of informal area and parkland, and three hectares of formal garden, which includes a rose garden, orchard, kitchen garden, various shrubberies with small trees and perennials, mature pines, monkey puzzle trees, and cypresses. The garden is approached across a timber pedestrian bridge spanning the creek and through an attractive old-style timber gate.

The T-shaped bluestone woolshed is on the other side of the creek, on a rise, with its south wall concealed by corrugated iron additions. There are two bluestone houses east of the woolshed, on the other side of the creek. The coursed bluestone ram shed has a slatted floor, with subfloor access doors.

== See also ==
- Barwon Park
- Mawallok
