= Ballarat–Skipton Rail Trail =

Rail trail in Victoria, Australia

Coordinates: 37.55982°S 143.858242°E

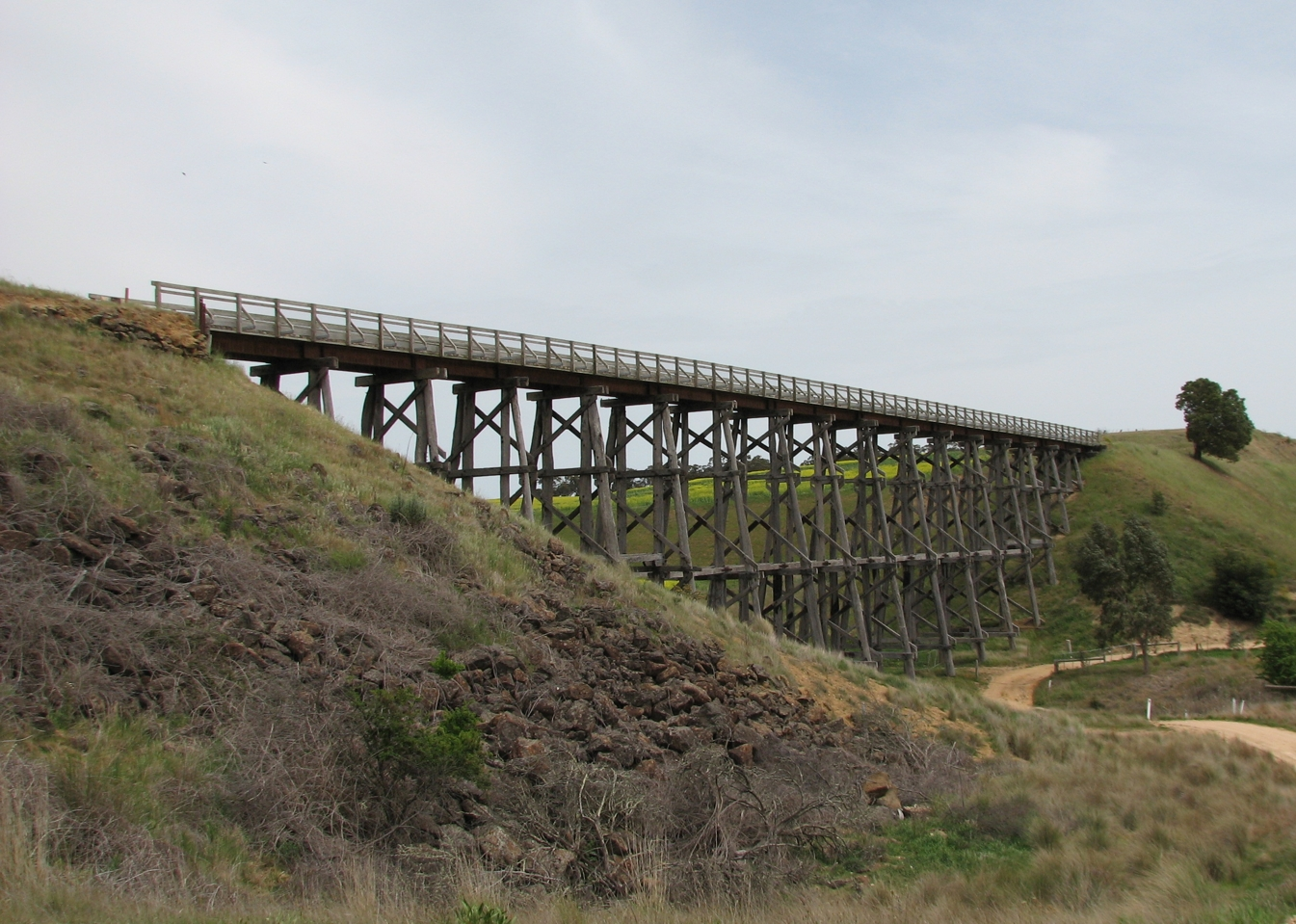
Nimmons Bridge

The Ballarat–Skipton Rail Trail in western Victoria, Australia, runs 53 kilometres along the old Skipton railway line from western Ballarat, southwest through Haddon, Smythesdale and Pittong to Skipton. The trail was in poor condition for many years before being upgraded and resurfaced in 2008, at a cost of $700,000, funded in roughly equal measure by local, state and federal government. The new surface is "compacted granitic sand". The total length of the trail is 53 km including an 8 km section from Ballarat railway station to the trailhead.

One major landmark on the route is the historic timber Nimons Bridge at Newtown over which the trail passes. An adjacent dirt road also permits a close inspection of the structure.

== Distances ==
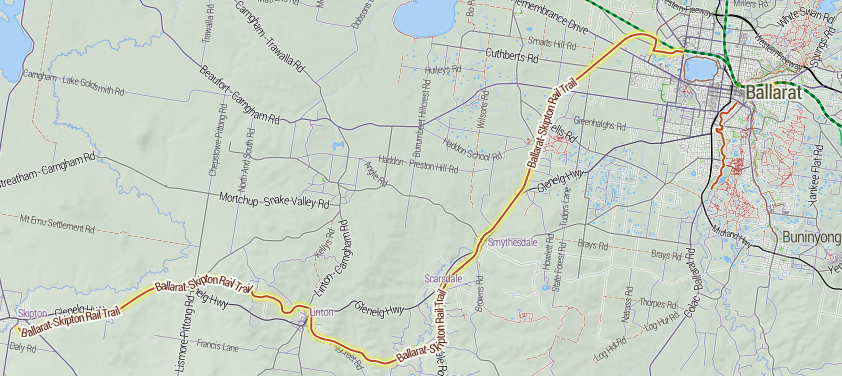
Map of the Ballarat-Skipton Rail Trail.

- 0 km: Trail begins at Ballarat railway station.
- 4.5 km: Arch of Victory and Avenue of Honour. Trees commemorate Ballarat residents who enlisted in World War I between 1917 and 1919.
- 7.6 km: Rail trail proper starts.
- 10.2 km: Cardigan Station.
- 17.8 km: Haddon Station.
- 25 km: Smythesdale Station; Smythesdale was a former gold mining town.
- 29.3 km: Scarsdale Station.
- 33.8 km: New Town Station, Nimmons Bridge.
- 36.5 km: Ruins of another trestle bridge.
- 42.3 km: Historic township of Linton.
- 50 km: Pittong
- 62.6 km: Skipton Station.
- 63 km: Skipton

== History ==
Gold was first discovered in Smythesdale at the Woady Yaloak River in 1852. Miners soon flocked to the area for a piece of the prosperity and the region’s population boomed. By 1859 the population in the Smythes Creek Goldfields area was 20,000. In the late 1800s, this thriving diggers’ town became the last administration centre for the Ballarat Goldfields. Remnants of this era are on display at the Smythesdale Historic Precinct

Further gold was discovered on the northern portion of the Emu Hill pastoral run in 1855, bringing miners from around the world, and leading to the eventual establishment of the town called Linton in 1860.

Gold was found in the vicinity of Scarsdale in 1856, mainly on a semi-circular alignment which coincided with Brown’s diggings about 2.5 km east-north-east of Scarsdale. The diggings were developed towards the end of the 1850s, and Scarsdale’s best gold years were 1861-64. Mining continued until the 1900s. The district’s first school was opened in 1861 at Scarsdale. Settlement extended southwards to the extent that an adjoining settlement was named Newtown. On 25 July 1862, the borough of Brown’s and Scarsdale was proclaimed, extending southwards to Cape Clear. Industries included two foundries, two brickfields, a brewery, a tannery and several hotels.
