= Cardigan, Victoria =

Cardigan Ballarat, Victoria
- Coordinates: 37.5370°S 143.7439°E
- Population: 1,064 (2021 census)
- Postcode(s): 3352
- LGA(s): City of Ballarat
- State electorate(s): Ripon
- Federal division(s): Ballarat
Suburbs around Cardigan:
Cardigan Village, Windermere	Mitchell Park	Mitchell Park
Bo Peep	Cardigan	Lucas
Haddon	Bunkers Hill	Delacombe

Cardigan is a suburb on the north-western rural-urban fringe of Ballarat in Victoria, Australia. At the 2021 census, Cardigan had a population of 1,064.

Cardigan Post Office opened 1 January 1861 and was closed on 30 June 1975.
