= Scarsdale, Victoria =

Scarsdale
- Town
- Coordinates: 37°40′42″S 143°40′34″E
- Country: Australia
- State: Victoria
- LGA: Golden Plains Shire
- Location: 22 km (14 mi) SW of Ballarat; 116 km (72 mi) W of Melbourne

Government
  - State electorate: Ripon
  - Federal division: Ballarat

Population
  - Total: 855 (SAL 2021)
- Postcode: 3351
Localities around Scarsdale
Snake Valley	Smythesdale	Ross Creek
Linton	Scarsdale	Napoleons
Happy Valley	Newtown	Enfield

Scarsdale is a small town in Victoria, Australia, approximately 25 km south west of Ballarat. It is situated in the north-western part of Golden Plains Shire, on the bank of the Woady Yaloak River and is primarily an agricultural community. Scarsdale township includes a few community facilities including a primary school, a kindergarten, a general store, town hall, post office, community park and the Scarsdale Hotel. The township is built along the Glenelg Highway, which is the main route to Ballarat, the closest city.

The Scarsdale-Newtown Avenue Of Honour was established to commemorate World War I.

At the 2016 census, Scarsdale and the surrounding area had a population of 744.
