= Bunkers Hill, Victoria =

Bunkers Hill
- Suburb
- Interactive map of Bunkers Hill
- Coordinates: 37.5706°S 143.7423°E
- Country: Australia
- State: Victoria
- City: Ballarat
- LGA: City of Ballarat

Government
  - State electorate: Ripon
  - Federal division: Ballarat

Population
  - Total: 270 (SAL 2021)
- Postcode: 3352
Suburbs around Bunkers Hill
	Cardigan
Bo Peep	Bunkers Hill	Winter Valley
	Haddon

Bunkers Hill is a locality on the southern rural fringe of the City of Ballarat in Victoria, Australia. At the 2021 census, Bunkers Hill had a population of 270.

Bunker's Hill was originally a gold rush settlement, and diggings there opened up c. 1859. The locality was previously known as Kopke and Trunk Lead. A two–room state school at Bunker's Hill was active in the early 19th century but burned down in a 1934 fire.

Greenhalgh's Tannery, one of the few remaining in Australia, is located on Greenhalghs Road. The family–owned vegetable tannery was founded in 1865 during the gold rush. It is the only Australian tannery still using the traditional methods, such as wattle bark. They enjoy a reliable source of income through high-end saddlery. However, they could become threatened by recent housing developments on farmland and tighter regulations. Sago Hill Mine, off Trunk Lead Road, is listed on the Victorian Heritage Inventory as a former mine shaft.
