= Newtown, Victoria (Golden Plains Shire) =

Newtown Victoria
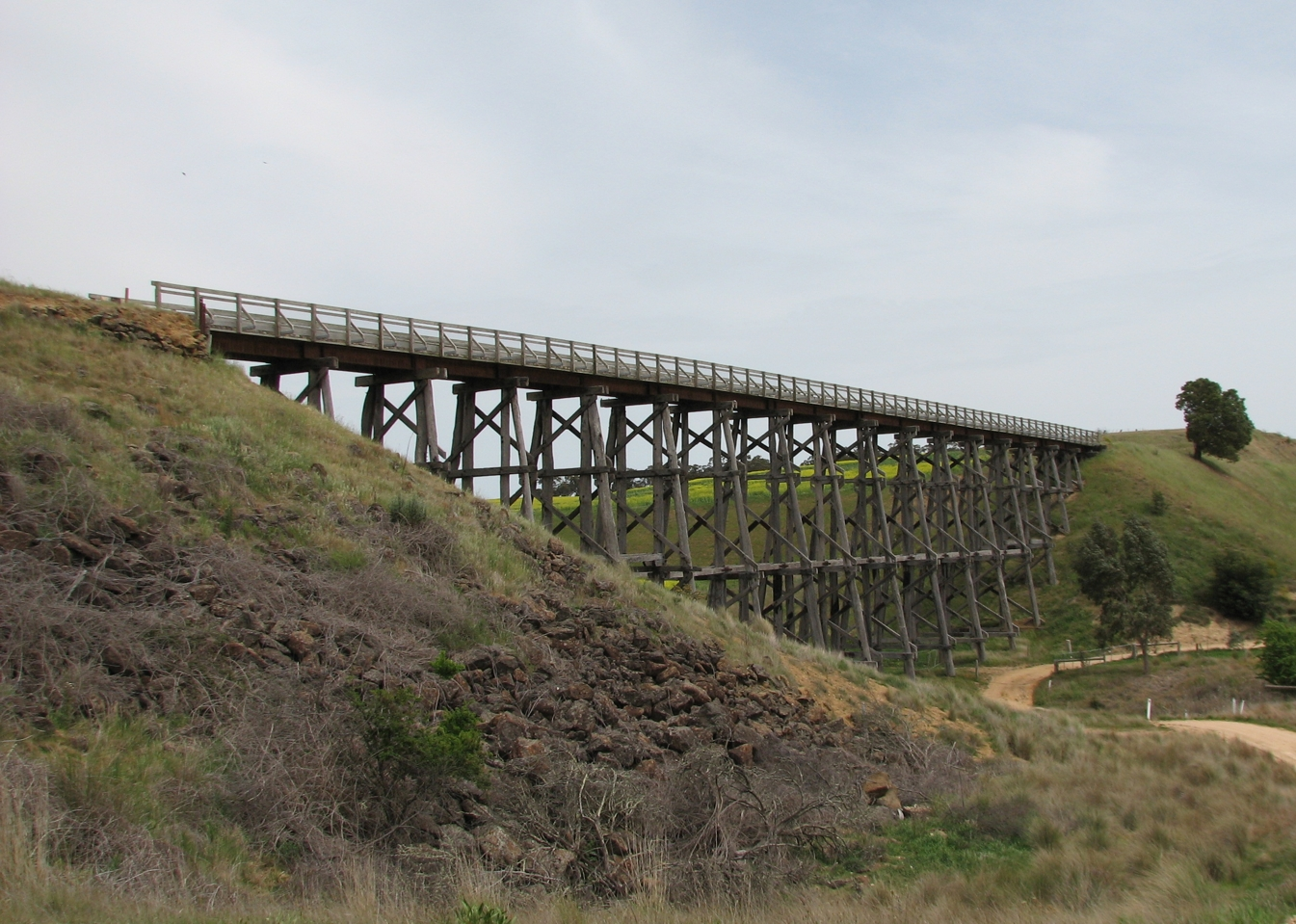
- Nimmons Bridge

- Coordinates: 37°42′0″S 143°39′0″E
- Population: 189 (2021 census)
- Postcode(s): 3351
- Location: 144 km (89 mi) NW of Melbourne; 28 km (17 mi) SW of Ballarat
- LGA(s): Golden Plains Shire
- State electorate(s): Eureka
- Federal division(s): Ballarat
Localities around Newtown:
Scarsdale	Scarsdale	Scarsdale
Happy Valley	Newtown	Enfield
Piggoreet	Piggoreet; Staffordshire Reef	Staffordshire Reef

Newtown is a locality situated on Pitfield Road (Lismore - Scarsdale Road) in Golden Plains Shire, 144 km north-west of Melbourne, in Victoria, Australia.

The Post Office opened on 12 November 1868 as Newtown-Scarsdale (to distinguish it from Newtown, now a suburb of Geelong). The office closed in 1957.

The Ballarat-Skipton Rail Trail follows the former railway line from Ballarat to Skipton, crossing the Woady Yaloak River on the nearby Nimmons Trestle Bridge, which is one of the largest timber trestle bridges in Victoria.

The former recreation reserve, Newtown Cricket and Mustering Reserve, is currently unused. The surrounding grassland is classified as a biodiversity reserve by the Ballarat Environment Network.

== Notable residents ==
- Charles McGrath (1872–1934), politician
