= Khosro Agha hammam =

Destroyed historic bathhouse in Isfahan, Iran

- حمام خسروآقا
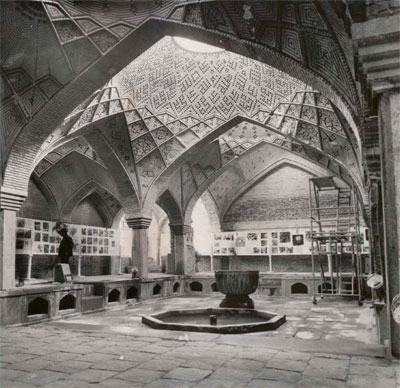

- Location within Iran

General information
- Status: Cultural
- Type: hammam
- Architectural style: Isfahani
- Location: Isfahan, Iran
- Coordinates: 32.6590°N 51.6739°E

The Khosro Agha hammam (Persian: حمام خسروآقا) was a historical hammam in Iran. It was located in Sepah street in Isfahan and belonged to the Safavid era.

== History ==
Its dressing room was changed to a store in 1975. It was damaged heavily, and then repaired. Later, the extension of Ostandari street (now Hakim street) was decided. Because the street passed the hammam, this project was canceled. In 1979, some neighborhood residents rumored that vice and harlotry took place in the hammam and wanted the hammam to be destroyed. Their motive was that they wanted the new street to be constructed and consequently the costs of their estates to be increased.

In 1980 a bomb exploded in the hammam and only some columns remained from Garmkhaneh (hothouse).

In 1992, the city's supreme council rejected the construction of a new street because of the location of the hammam.

On 12 April 1995 unidentified people attacked the Khosro Agha hammam and made sure that the guard was unconscious. They completely destroyed this historic structure and stole its unique stone trough.
