= Cardigan Village =

- Suburb
- Interactive map of Cardigan Village
- Coordinates: 37.5179°S 143.7084°E
- Country: Australia
- State: Victoria
- City: Ballarat
- LGA: City of Ballarat

Government
  - State electorate: Ripon
  - Federal division: Ballarat

Population
  - Total: 957 (2021 census)
- Postcode: 3352
Suburbs around Cardigan Village
	Windermere
Cardigan	Cardigan Village	Alfredton
	Haddon

Cardigan Village is a town on the north-western rural-urban fringe of Ballarat in Victoria, Australia. At the 2021 census, Cardigan had a population of 957. It was named after James Brudenell, 7th Earl of Cardigan, who led the Charge of the Light Brigade at the Battle of Balaclava during the Crimean War. It is recorded as having a school in 1860, 1903, and 1960; and in 1903 also had a Presbyterian church, a post office, and a hotel.

It stands on the traditional land of the Wadawurrung peoples, on the path they historically took twice a year between Ballarat, where they wintered, and Lake Burrumbeet, where they spent the summer.
