= List of watering troughs in Karachi =

Karachi's public watering troughs were constructed mainly during the late 19th and early 20th centuries, when animal-drawn transport was central to the movement of people and goods. They supplied water to horses, cattle, and other working animals. Many were donated by local philanthropists and bear inscriptions commemorating their donors or family members.

Several surviving troughs are made from local Gizri stone and combine a practical function with European-influenced architectural style. Their use declined with the expansion of piped water and motorized transport. Many were subsequently demolished, altered, encroached upon or abandoned.

At least 30 watering troughs were built during British Raj. The following list includes documented surviving troughs:

== List ==
=== Existing ===
Name	Photo	Coordinates	Location	Notes
Shahrah-e-Iran Water Trough			Shahrah-e-Iran, Karachi	Listed as entry no. 421 in the Government of Sindh heritage schedule.
M.A. Jinnah Road Watering Trough		24°50′51″N 66°59′43″E	M.A. Jinnah Road, Karachi	
Thakur Morarji Shiv Boda Watering Trough			Near Pakistan Chowk	It was built by Thakur Valamji Morarji in memory of his father Thakur Morarji Shiv Boda.
Pahlajrai Revachand Panjabi Watering Trough			Near Merewether Tower, Karachi	It was donated by Pahlajrai Revachand Panjabi.
Byram Edulji Watering Trough			Near Guru Mandir, Karachi	It was built in 1893 by Byram Edulji in memory of his parents.
Diwan Dayaram Chellaram Mirchandani Watering Trough		24°51′27″N 67°00′38″E	Baba-e-Urdu Road, formerly Mission Road, near the Civil Hospital, Karachi and Dow University	It was built in 1927 by Shrimati Aplibai in memory of her husband, Diwan Dayaram Chellaram Mirchandani, a former city surveyor who died in 1924. Students of Dow Medical College restored it in 1995, and it received another facelift in 2007.
Framroze E. Punthakey Watering Trough			Soldier Bazaar, Karachi	It was built in 1924 and is named after Framroze E. Punthakey who served as the Honorary Secretary General of SPCA between 1878 and 1921.
Bahadur Nusserwangi Metha Watering Trough			Chand Bibi Road, formerly Princess Street, near Eidgah and Borapir	It was erected by the staff of the Nusserwangi Company in memory of Bahadur Nusserwangi Metha.
Napier Mole Watering Trough			Near Napier Mole Bridge, Karachi	It was built in 1900 by Byram Edulji.
Nanakwara Garden Watering Trough			Nanakwara Garden	It was gifted by the Dumb Animals Fund.

=== Former or lost troughs ===
Name or site	Location	Notes
Edulji Dinshaw Dispensary Water Trough	Behind the Edulji Dinshaw Dispensary, Saddar	Originally constructed by Byram Edulji
