= Smythesdale =

- Town
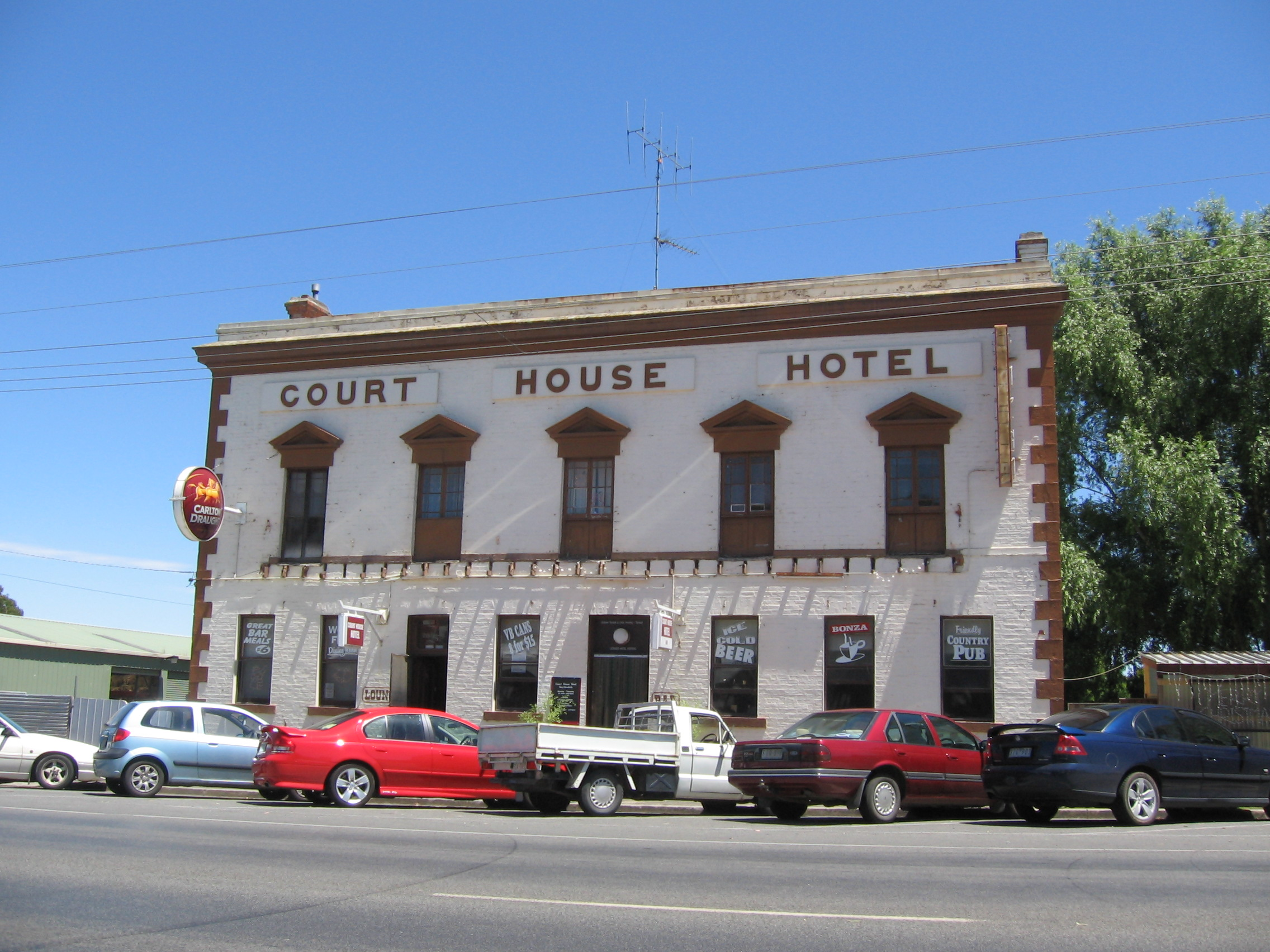
- Court House Hotel

- Coordinates: 37°39′0″S 143°41′0″E
- Country: Australia
- State: Victoria
- LGA: Golden Plains Shire
- Location: 136 km (85 mi) W of Melbourne; 21 km (13 mi) SW of Ballarat; 79 km (49 mi) NW of Bannockburn

Government
  - State electorate: Ripon
  - Federal division: Ballarat

Population
  - Total: 1,189 (2021 census)
- Postcode: 3351
Localities around Smythesdale
Hillcrest	Haddon	Nintingbool and Smythes Creek
Snake Valley	Smythesdale	Ross Creek
Scarsdale	Scarsdale	Scarsdale

Smythesdale is a town in Victoria, Australia. The town is located on the Glenelg Highway. Most of the town is located in the Golden Plains Shire local government area. Smythesdale is 19 kilometres (12 mi) west of Ballarat and 135 kilometres (84 mi) west of the state capital, Melbourne. At the 2021 census, Smythesdale and the surrounding area had a population of 1,189. Smythesdale Primary School is a part of the Woady Yaloak PS with Ross Creek, Scarsdale, and Snake Valley as the other campus.

The town was established during the Victorian Gold Rush, and the Post Office opened on 14 July 1854. The town was known as Smythe's Creek until 1864.

Facilities in the town include the Court House Hotel, a bluestone police lock up, constructed in 1869 and the old Court House, now home to the local historical society. The former courthouse closed on 1 January 1983 after having not been visited by a Magistrate since 1976, was briefly used as a Sunday school, and was then leased to the historical society in 1985.

Smythesdale is the birthplace of Arthur Alfred Lynch, a polymath who was trained in engineering and medicine, wrote poetry, was a Member of the British Parliament and fought against the British in the Second Boer War. It was also home to women's rights activist, Lillias Margaret Skene.

Smythesdale Football Club won the 1901 Grenville Football Association Premiership by finishing on the top of the ladder.

== Heritage listed sites ==
Smythesdale contains a number of heritage listed sites, including:

- Glenelg Highway, Glenelg Highway Stone Mileposts
- 64 Brooke Street, Smythesdale Court House
- Surface Hill Road, Surface Hill Hydraulic Gold Sluicing Pit
