= Garibaldi, Victoria =

Garibaldi Victoria
- Coordinates: 37°43′0″S 143°53′0″E
- Postcode(s): 3352
- LGA(s): Golden Plains Shire
- State electorate(s): Eureka
- Federal division(s): Ballarat
Localities around Garibaldi:
Napoleons	Durham Lead	Scotsburn
Enfield	Garibaldi
Dereel	Grenville	Shelford

Garibaldi is a locality in the Western District of the Australian state of Victoria, on the lands of the Wathaurong people.

Garibaldi is a town within the local government area of Golden Plains. It covers around 12 square kilometers of mostly farms and rural holdings. The township grew originally around mining activity during the gold rush In 2021, Garibaldi had a population of 131 with a median age of 43.

The main landmark in Garibaldi is the Garibaldi Hall on Hardies Hill Road, which was originally the Garibaldi School opened in 1879. The School was built with capacity for 150 students. The School closed in 1943, with the Education Department considering removing the vacant School Building to Lismore in 1948.

It remained in Garibaldi and was restored as a Community Hall around 1986. The Hall is surrounded by Monterey Pine trees planted as a memorial to the soldiers of the district who served in World War One, a sculpture created as part of a public art programme in 2018, a playground constructed in 2021, and wetlands.
