= Napoleons =

- Town
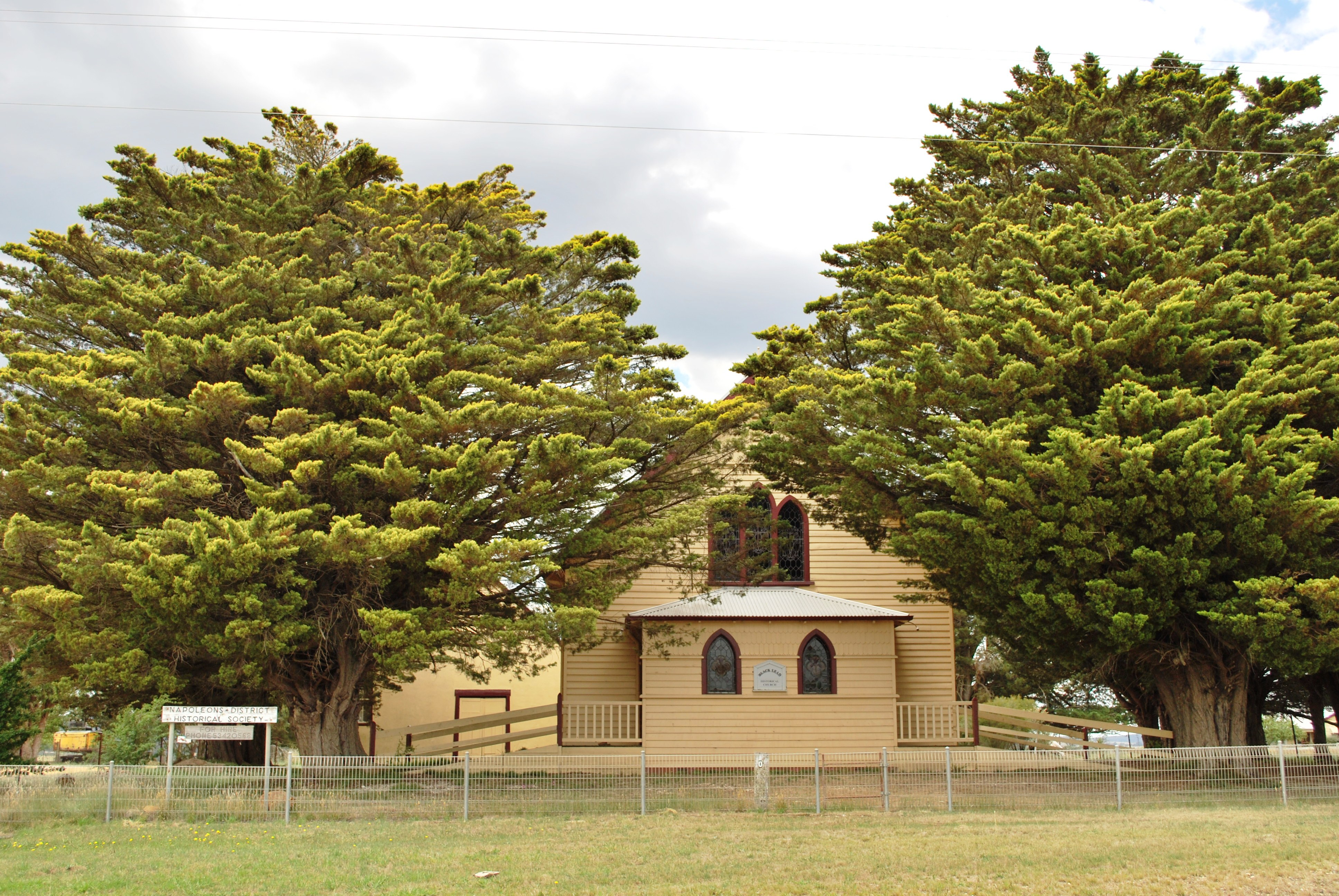
- The historic Black Lead church, now home to Napoleons District Historical Society

- Coordinates: 37°41′0″S 143°50′0″E
- Country: Australia
- State: Victoria
- LGA: Golden Plains Shire
- Location: 131 km (81 mi) W of Melbourne; 15 km (9.3 mi) S of Ballarat; 9 km (5.6 mi) SW of Buninyong

Government
  - State electorate: Ripon
  - Federal division: Ballarat

Population
  - Total: 555 (SAL 2021)
- Postcode: 3352
Localities around Napoleons
| Ross Creek | Cambrian Hill | Scotchmans Lead |
| Scarsdale | Napoleons | Durham Lead |
| Enfield | Enfield | Garibaldi |

Napoleons is a town in Victoria, Australia in the Golden Plains Shire local government area, 131 kilometres (81 mi) west of the state capital, Melbourne. At the 2016 census, Napoleons had a population of 553.

The Post Office opened on 1 September 1862, was known as Napoleon until around 1950, and closed in 1971. A Community Postal Agency opened at the Napoleons general store on 17 April 2012. Australia Post continues to refer to the post office as "Napoleon".

The town is served by Napoleons Primary School, with an enrolment of 102. The current school opened in 2002. The original school, situated nearby, opened in 1870.
