= Lillias Margaret Skene =

Australian activist (1867–1957)

Lillias Margaret Skene MBE
- Born: Lillias Margaret Hamilton; 28 March 1867; Smythesdale, Victoria, Australia
- Died: 25 March 1957 (aged 89); Armadale, Victoria, Australia
- Occupation: Women's rights activist

Lillias Margaret Skene, MBE (née Hamilton; 28 March 1867 – 25 March 1957) was an Australian women's rights activist.

== Early life ==
Lillias Hamilton was born on 28 March 1867 in Smythesdale, Victoria, Australia, the third child of Scottish-born police magistrate John Prendergast Hamilton and his English-born wife Agnes Margaret (née Buchanan). Hamilton attended the local Alexandra College in Hamilton. On 7 November 1888, at St Mary's Anglican Church in Caulfield, she married 33-year-old sheepmaster David Alexander Skene.

== Career ==
Straddled in debt, Hamilton's husband had to seek employment in New South Wales, while she and her children remained in Hamilton. In 1900 the family moved to Manly, Sydney, where they ran a modest dairy farm. In 1906, they moved to Melbourne and her husband began selling wool. The family purchased a property in South Yarra in 1910.

Unable to make the second payment on the property he was buying when the banks collapsed in the early 1890s, her husband was forced to work as a station-manager in New South Wales. Skene and their children stayed at Hamilton. They rejoined him at Curraweena station, near Bourke, in 1896 before moving to Glenariff and then in 1900 to Manly, Sydney. There they invested in a small dairy and leased 25 acres (10 ha). In the face of drought and the high cost of fodder, they sold out in 1906 and moved to Melbourne, where David set up as a woolbroker and stock-and-station agent. In 1910, with money inherited from her mother, Skene acquired a house for the family at South Yarra.

Skene was the assistant-secretary of the National Council of Women of Victoria (Victorian NCW). In 1915, she became the honorary manager and storekeeper of the Melbourne-based Home Hospital situated in the Government House. In 1909, she was appointed as the honorary secretary of the Women's Hospital Committee's board of management.

Skene was appointed a Member of the Order of the British Empire for her contribution to the Red Cross during World War I. In 1927 she was one of the first women in Victoria to be made a justice of the peace.

== Final years ==
She retired from most of her commitments in 1949 and moved to Brighton. Skene died on 25 March 1957 in Armadale and was buried at the Brighton cemetery.

Skene Street, in the Canberra suburb of Cook, is named in her honour.
