= Bills horse troughs =

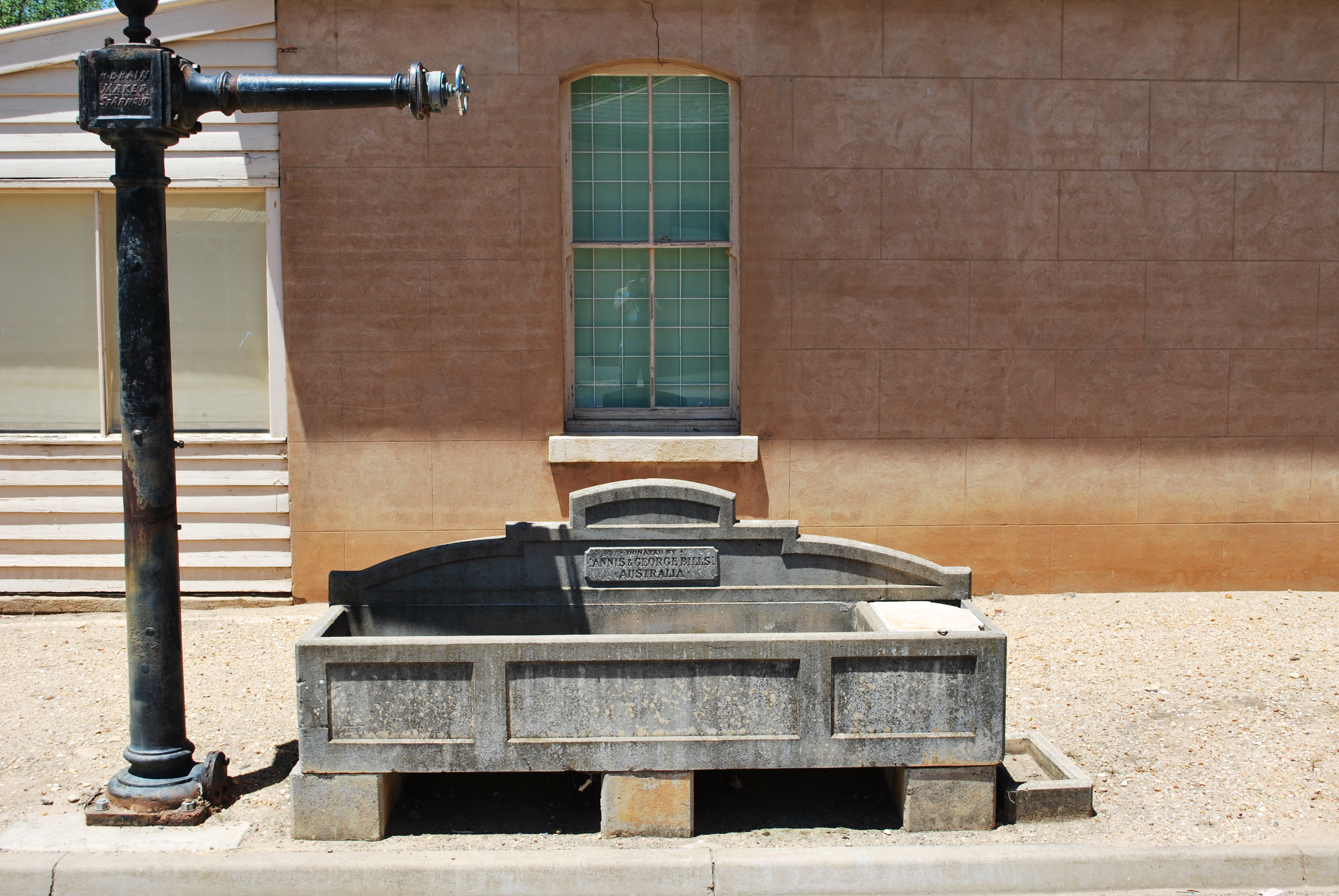
A Bills horse trough in St Arnaud, Victoria

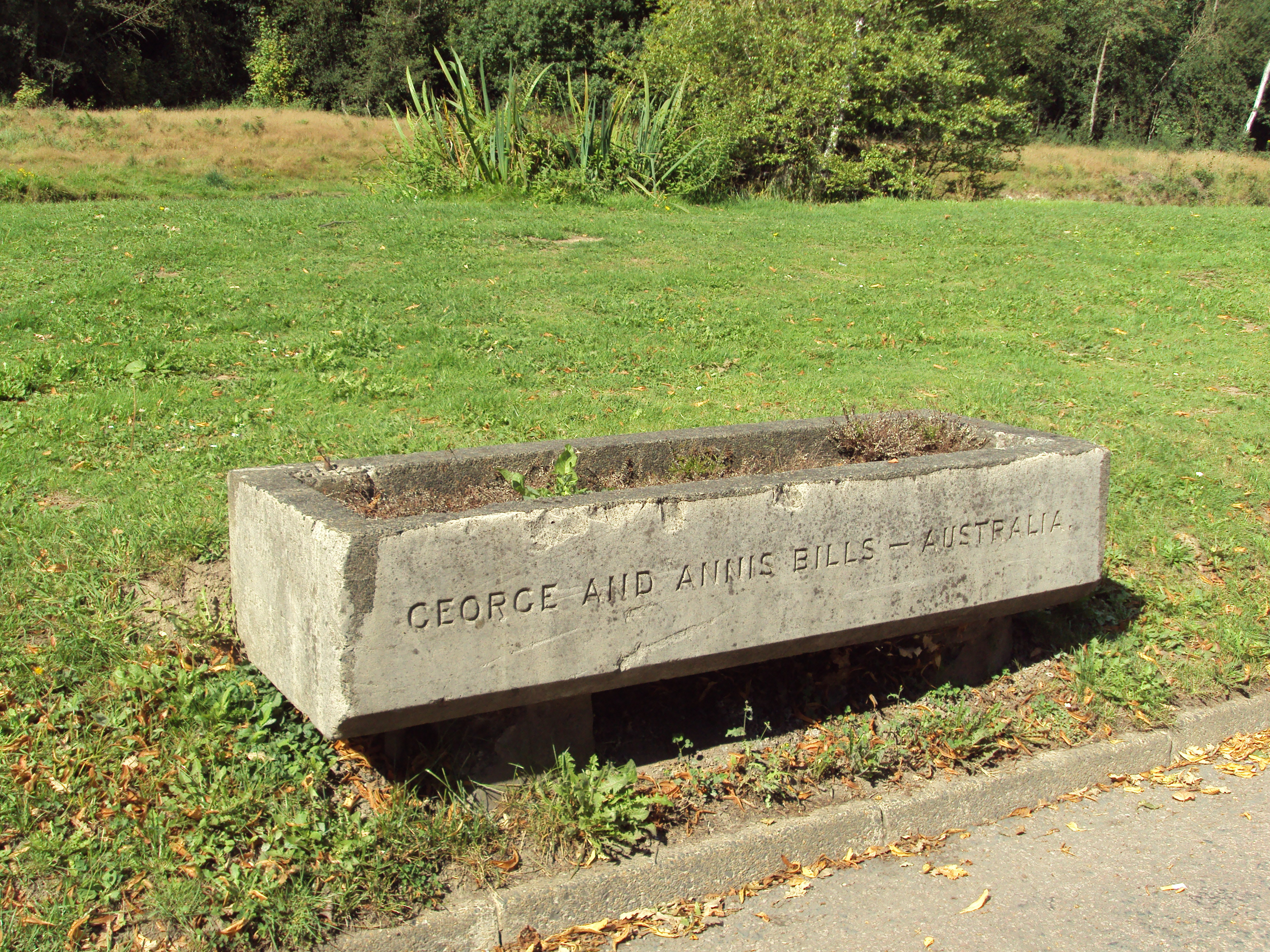
A rare Bills trough in Tunbridge Wells, one of only four identified in England. The others are in Englefield Green in northern Surrey, Hinckley Road in Leicester, and in Tilehurst, Reading.

Bills horse troughs are watering troughs that were manufactured in Australia and installed to provide relief for working horses in the first half of the twentieth century. The troughs were financed by a trust fund established through the will of George Bills. A total of around 700 troughs were distributed by the trust in Australia and 50 in several other countries.

== George and Annis Bills ==
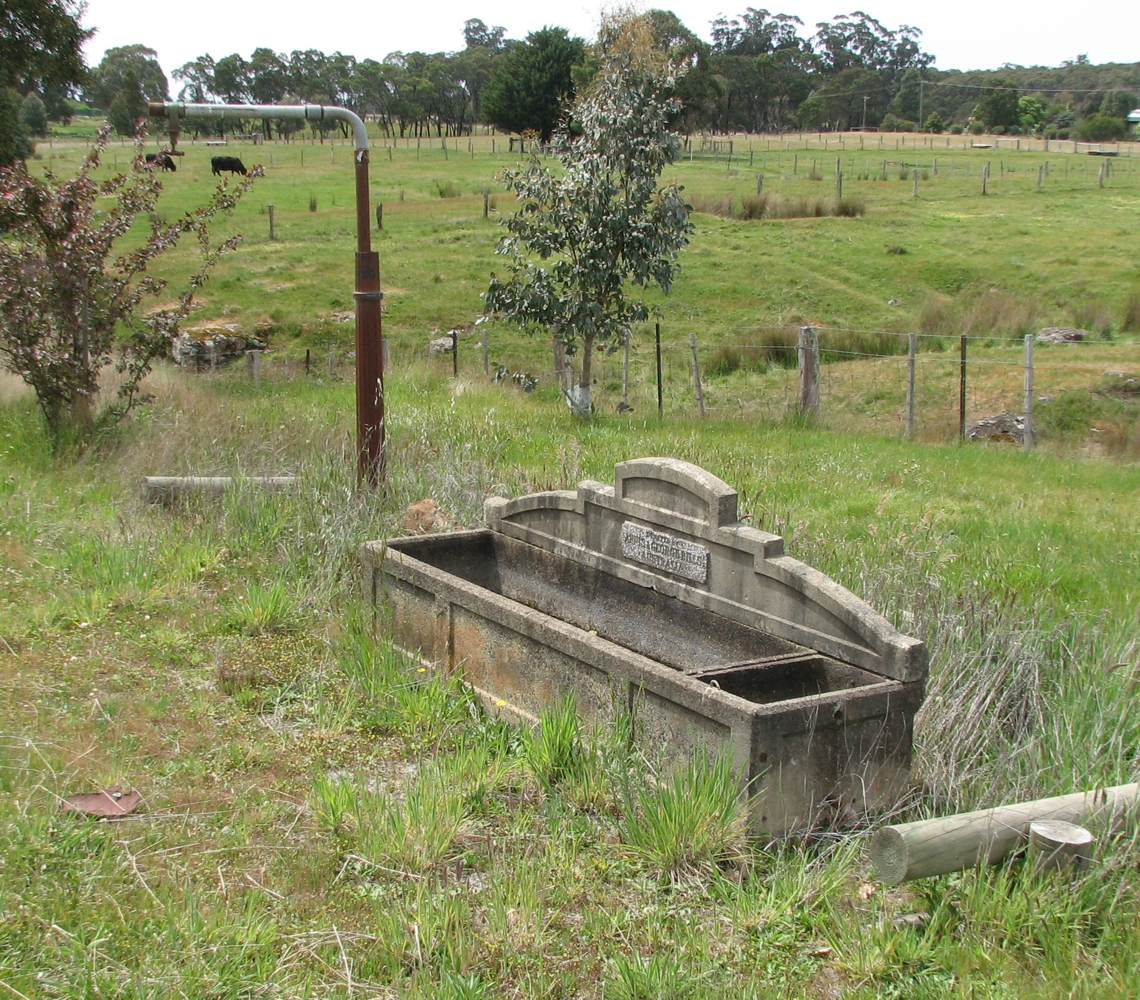
A Bills horse trough on the roadside at Newtown, Victoria

George Bills was born in Brighton in England in 1859. He migrated with his family to New Zealand and subsequently to Echuca, Victoria, in Australia in 1873. In 1882 he opened a bird dealers shop in Brisbane, where he met and married Annis Swann who had immigrated from Sheffield in England. In 1884 the couple moved to Sydney and George Bills went into business with his brothers, manufacturing wire mattresses; the origin of the firm BBB. In 1908, George retired to Hawthorn, Victoria, and in 1910, Annis died while the couple were visiting England. George became a Life Governor of the RSPCA in 1924.

== Trust fund ==
George and Annis had no children, and following the death of George in 1927, a trust fund was set up, believed to be around £70-80,000, administered by Bills' executors, Mr and Mrs W. H. Crook of Auburn, Victoria. One of the purposes of the trust, as set out in George Bills' will, was to:

"...construct and erect and pay for horse troughs wherever they may be of the opinion that such horse troughs are desirable for the relief of horses and other dumb animals either in Australasia, in the British Islands or in any other part of the world subject to the consent of the proper authorities being obtained."

Each trough cost £13 plus transport and installation. The majority of the troughs were installed in Victoria and New South Wales between 1930 and 1939.

Initially the troughs were individually designed and constructed, however by the early 1930s, J. B. Phillips, a relative of the Bills, became the head contractor. Working to a standard design he produced the troughs in Auburn Road in Hawthorn. The troughs were pre-cast concrete with a curved pediment with the inscription "Donated by Annis & George Bills Australia".

Manufacture was subsequently handled by Rocla, who produced troughs to the same design in Victoria and later in Junee in New South Wales. With the rise of motorised transport, demand for the troughs declined and production had ceased by the end of World War II.

Aside from the horse troughs, the trust was involved with other animal welfare projects including the establishment of the George Bills RSPCA Rescue Centre at Burwood East, Victoria which opened in 1964.

== Notes ==
- Metropolitan Drinking Fountain and Cattle Trough Association was founded in London in the year George Bills was born and was no doubt his inspiration.
