= Enfield, Victoria =

Enfield
- Town
- Coordinates: 37°43′50″S 143°46′0″E
- Country: Australia
- State: Victoria
- LGA: Golden Plains Shire
- Location: 149 km (93 mi) W of Melbourne; 25 km (16 mi) S of Ballarat

Government
  - State electorate: Buninyong
  - Federal division: Ballarat

Population
  - Total: 483 (UCL 2021)
- Postcode: 3352
Localities around Enfield
Scarsdale	Napoleons	Garibaldi
Newtown; Staffordshire Reef	Enfield	Grenville
Berringa	Dereel	Mount Mercer

Enfield is a locality in Victoria, Australia. It is in the Golden Plains Shire, near the regional city of Ballarat and 149 kilometres (93 mi) west of the state capital, Melbourne. At the 2016 census, Enfield and the surrounding area had a population of 538.

Enfield Post Office was renamed from Whim Holes Post office on 19 November 1874. It closed on 31 December 1971.
