= Haddon, Victoria =

Haddon
- Town
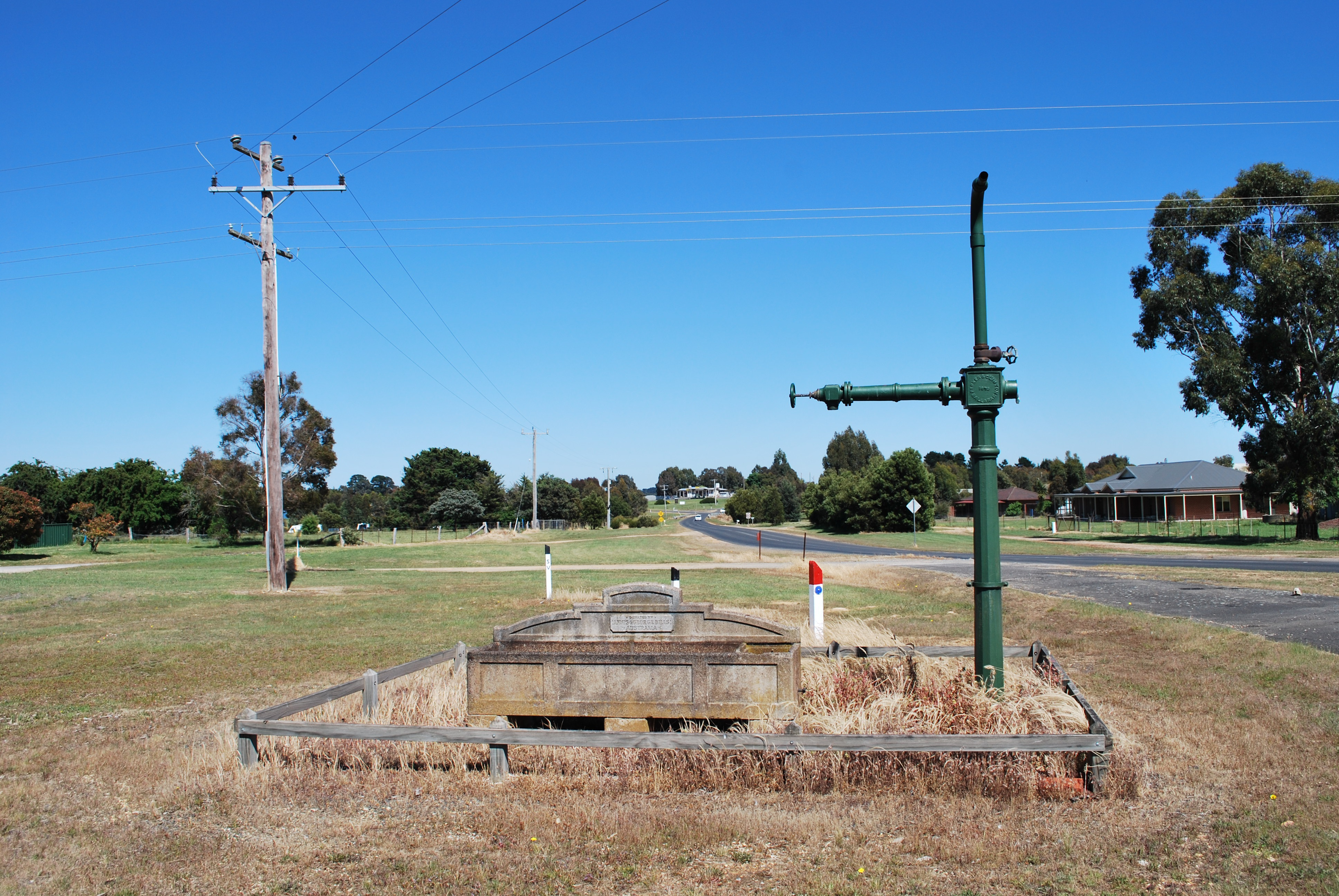
- The Bills Horse Trough in Haddon

- Coordinates: 37°35′18″S 143°41′58″E
- Country: Australia
- State: Victoria
- LGA: Golden Plains Shire
- Location: 13 km (8.1 mi) SW of Ballarat; 112 km (70 mi) NW of Melbourne

Government
  - State electorate: Ripon
  - Federal division: Ballarat

Population
  - Total: 1,276 (SAL 2021)
- Postcode: 3351
Localities around Haddon
| Bo Peep | Cardigan | Bunkers Hill |
| Snake Valley | Haddon | Smythes Creek |
| Hillcrest | Smythesdale | Nintingbool |

Haddon is a township in the Golden Plains Shire, 12 km west of Ballarat.

The population at the 2016 census was 1,194. 84.4% of people were born in Australia and 90.8% of people spoke only English at home. The most common responses for religion were No Religion 38.9%, Catholic 21.2% and Anglican 11.1%.

Haddon is home to Ballarat Kart Club, the original Haddon circuit was built in 1961, before being extended and widened to its modern configuration.

Around 3 km of the Ballarat-Skipton Rail Trail passes through Haddon on the east side.

Amongst Haddon there is a Day Care Centre, a Kindergarten, a Primary School, a General store and the Haddon Fire Brigade.

== River ==
Haddon is set on the Woady Yaloak River, which rises in some swamp land a few kilometres to the north. The river runs through paddocks, parks and under a road. The river has two bridges in the town, a footbridge in the park and a road bridge.
