= Skipton railway line =

Former railway line in Victoria, Australia

Skipton

Overview
- Status: Closed
- Former connections: Serviceton
- Stations: 7

Service
- Type: V/Line passenger service

History
- Opened: Newtown – Linton 1890, Linton – Skipton 1916
- Closed: 1986

Technical
- Line length: 55 km
- Number of tracks: 1 (now removed)

The Skipton Line was a branch line running south west from Ballarat to the town of Skipton, Victoria. The line branched from the main Serviceton Western line just after Ballarat at the Linton junction and was 55 kilometres long. The line was opened on 10 October 1890 and finally closed on 4 December 1986. The line had previously closed to passenger services in 1972.

It is now the Ballarat-Skipton Rail Trail.

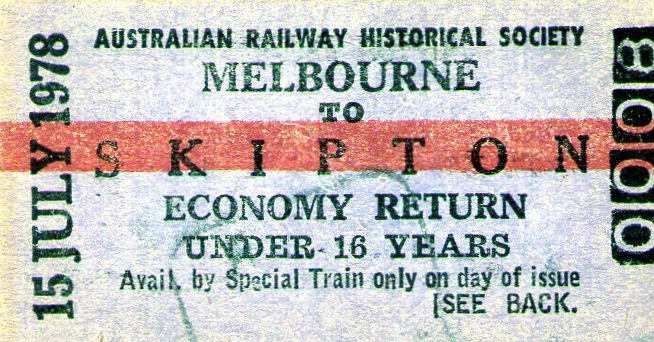
Melbourne-Skipton excursion rail ticket 1978
