= Watering trough =

Container for holding water for animals to drink from

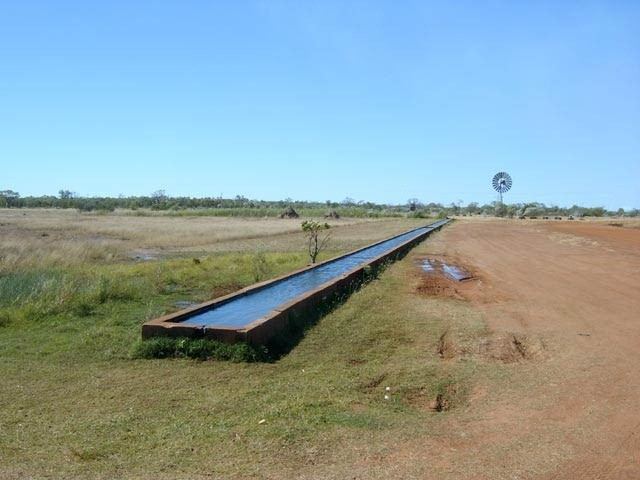
A watering trough on a stock route, Australia

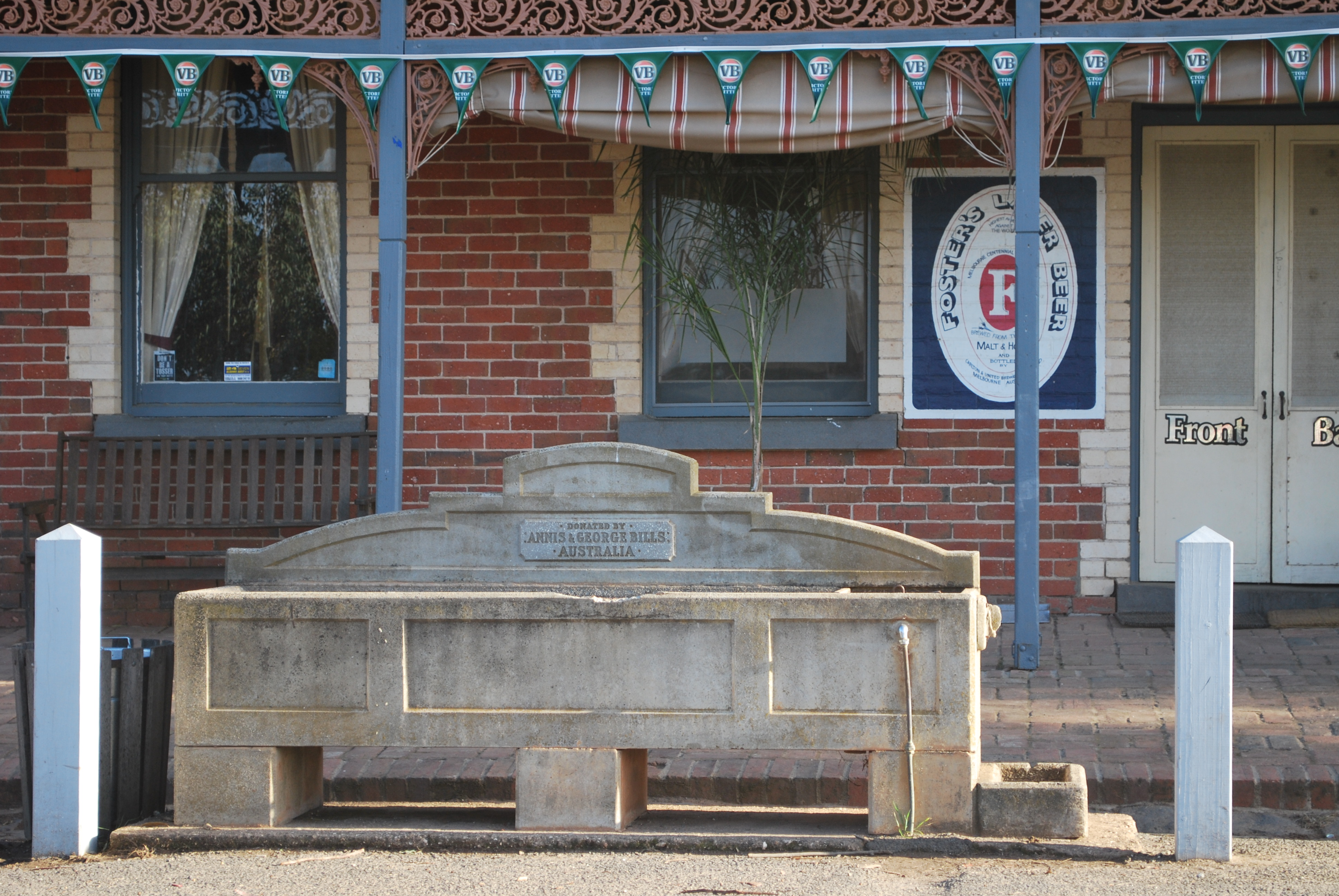
A Bills horse trough in Sebastian, Victoria, Australia

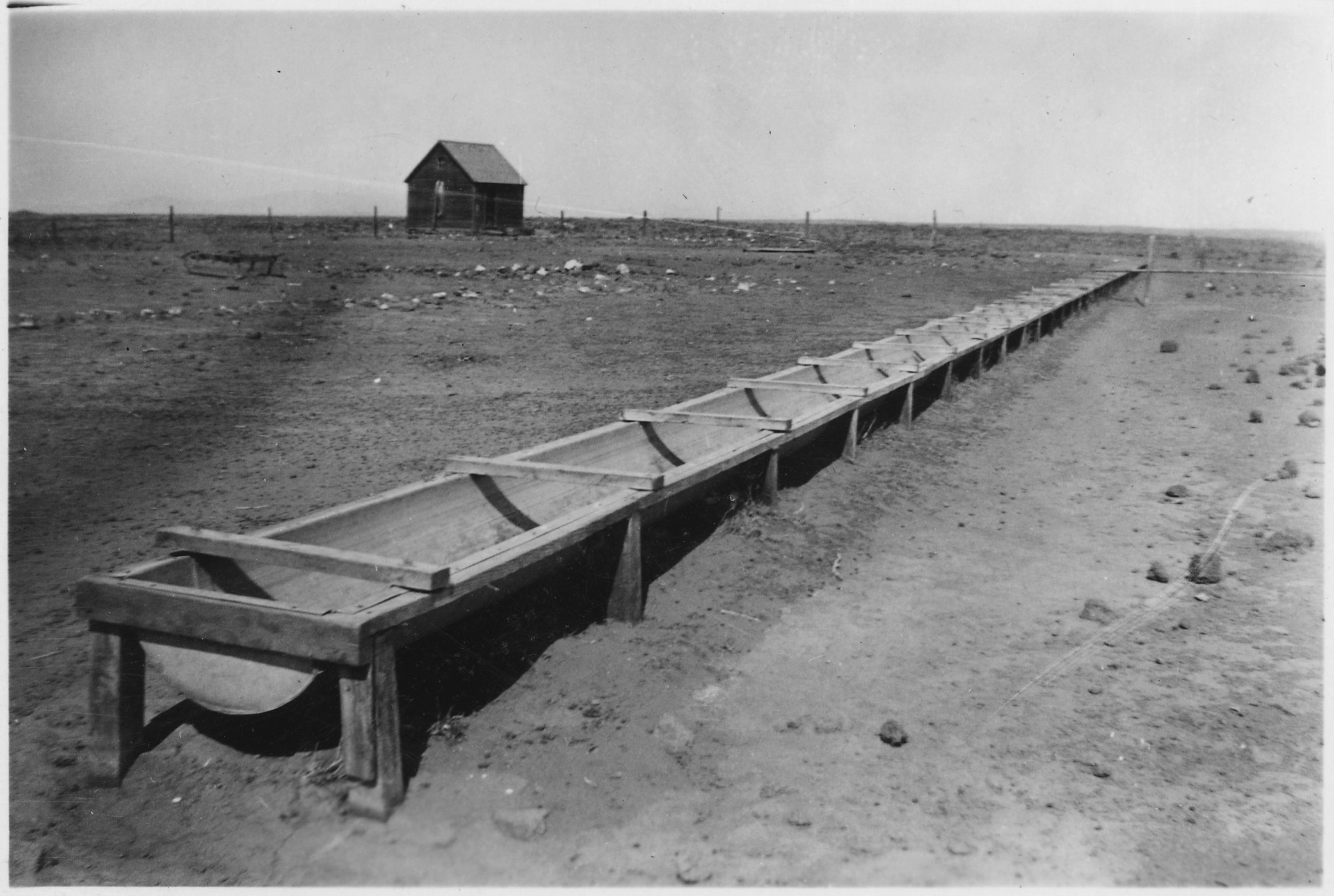
Sheep watering trough, Idaho, 1930s

A watering trough (or artificial watering point) is a man-made or natural receptacle intended to provide drinking water to animals, livestock on farms or ranches or wild animals.

== History ==
In Australia, the watering trough is established so that sheep, cattle and other domesticated animals can drink, but native species such as kangaroos may be attracted. To reduce this, some water troughs are designed to reduce their use of the trough or exclude them from that use. One design is the "Finlayson Trough", which uses a low-lying electrified wire that sheep usually step over but kangaroos cannot.

Watering troughs were very common in many towns and cities as a means for horses to drink while they were tethered to a post. In 1927 animal lovers, Annis and George Bills, funded the building of up to 500 watering troughs in Australia, Ireland, England and the United States. Many can still be seen today inscribed with Donated by Annis and George Bills Australia.

Nowadays, manufacturers provide a variety of water troughs for animals made of different materials. Permanent access to freshwater is essential to all animals, especially to dairy cows. The more water a cow drinks, the more milk she produces.

== Abreuvoir ==
An abreuvoir is a watering trough, fountain, or other installed basin: originally intended to provide humans and/or animals at a rural or urban watering place with fresh drinking water. They were often located at springs. In pre–automobile era cities, they were built as equestrian water troughs for horses providing transportation. In contemporary times, abreuvoirs are also seen as civic or private fountains in the designed townscape-landscape.

Translations

- English: Watering trough, basin trough fountain
- Spanish: Abrevadero
- French: Abreuvoir, fontaine pour les animaux
- German: Tränke
- Italian: Abbeveratoio

In stonemasonry, as an old or obsolete term, an abreuvoir is a joint or interstice between two stones, to be filled with mortar by a stonemason.

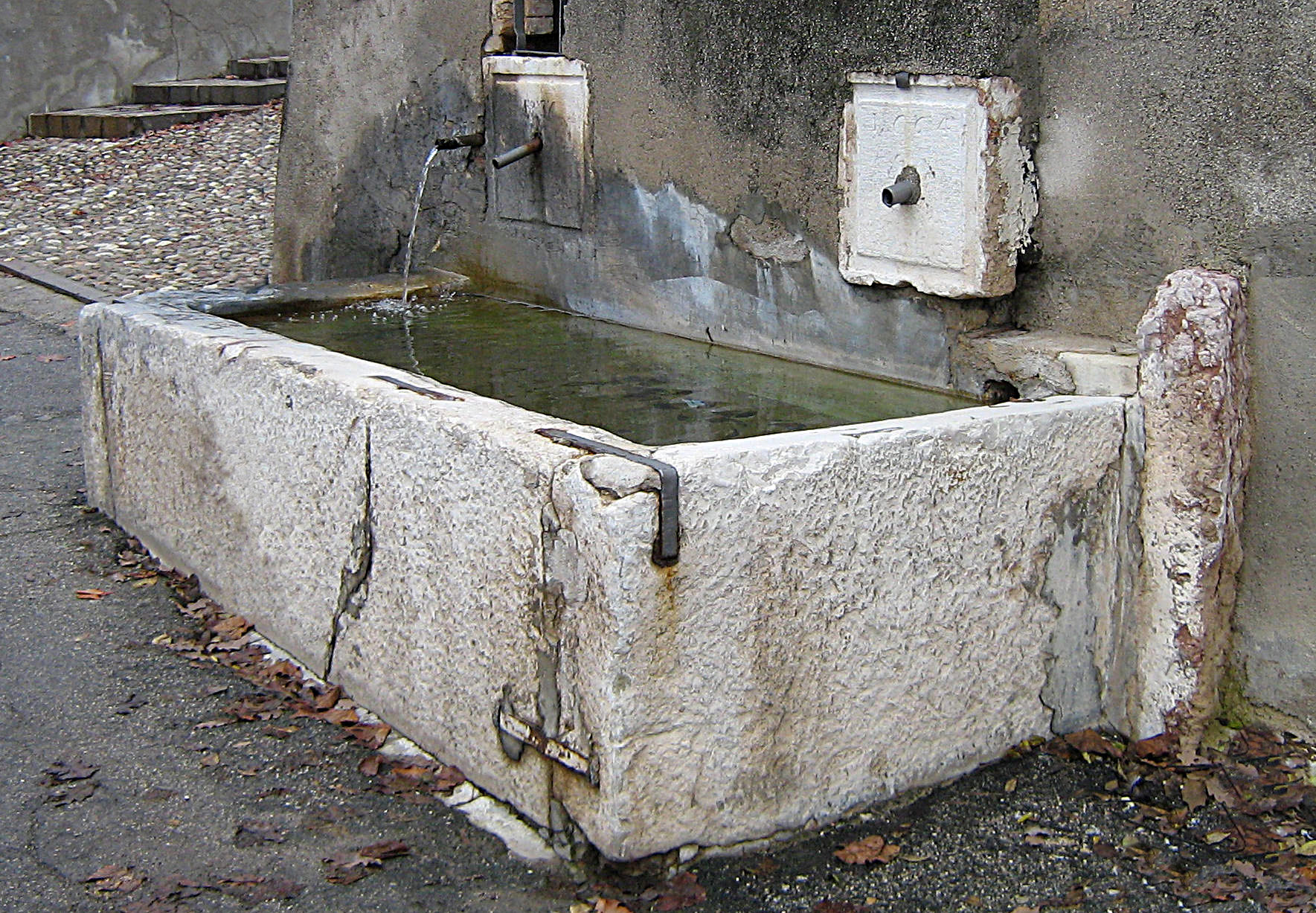
Abreuvoir fountain, Castiglione delle Stiviere, Fontana, Italy.

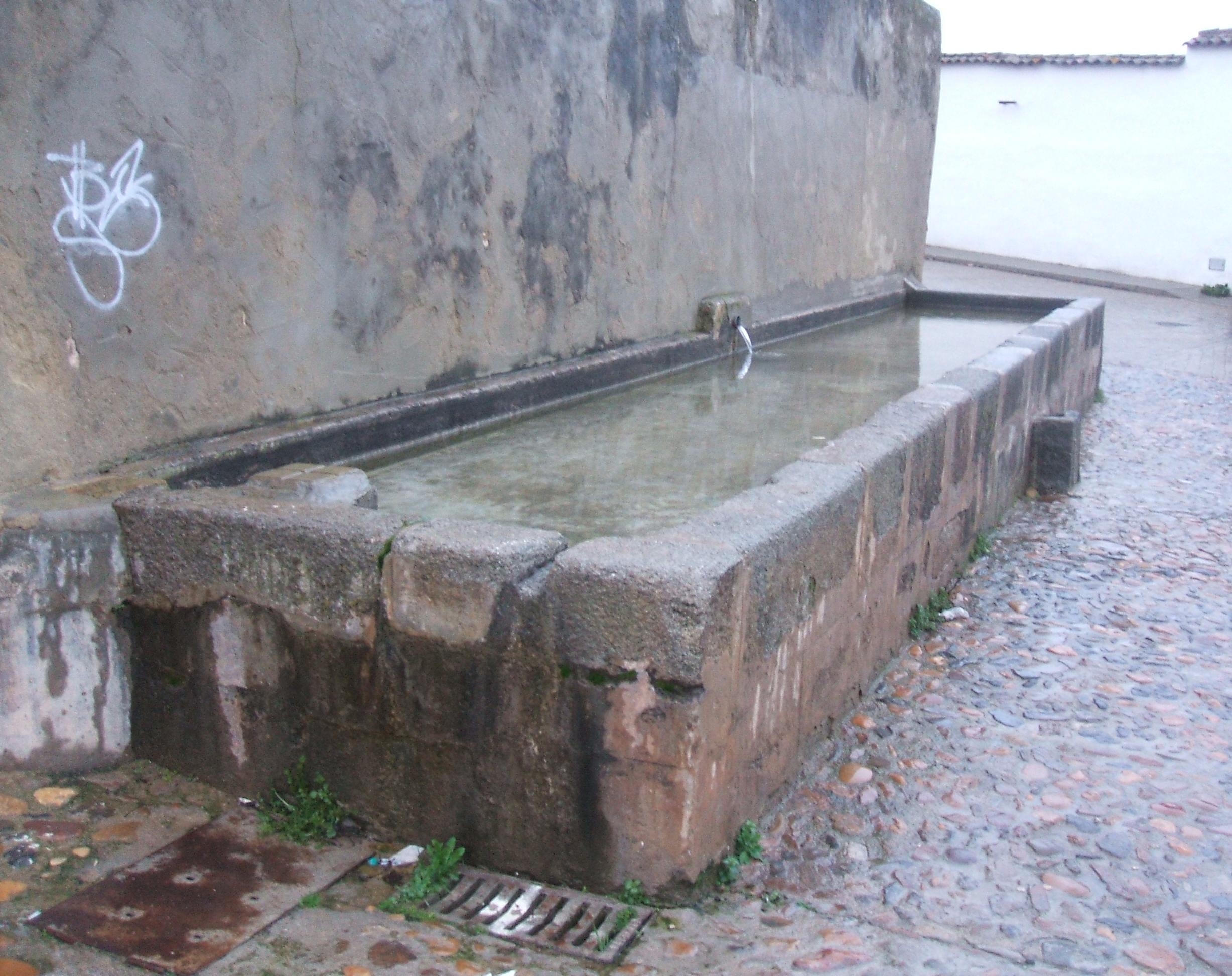
Abrevadero (abreuvoir), in Fregenal de la Sierra, Extremadura, Spain.

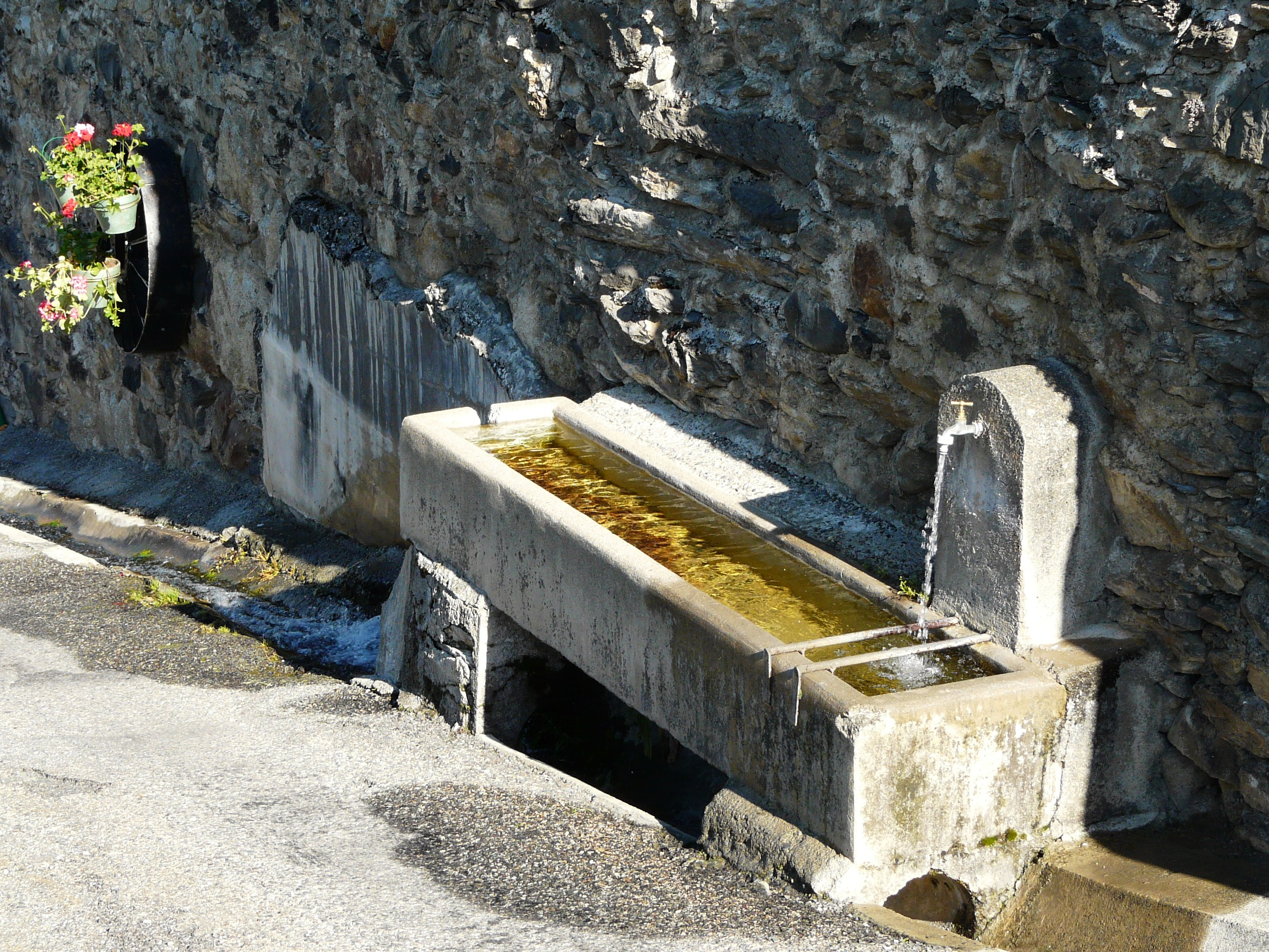
Fontaine-abreuvoir à Saint-Aventin, Haute-Garonne, France.

== See also ==
- List of watering troughs in Karachi
- Bills horse troughs
- Fountain of Sant Agustí Vell
- Metropolitan Drinking Fountain and Cattle Trough Association, a 19th-century charity that built watering troughs in London
- Stock tank

== General and cited references ==
Attribution
