= Bo Peep, Victoria =

Bo Peep Ballarat, Victoria
- Coordinates: 37.5310°S 143.6742°E
- Population: 25 (2021 census)
- Postcode(s): 3351
- LGA(s): City of Ballarat
- State electorate(s): Ripon
- Federal division(s): Ballarat
Suburbs around Bo Peep:
	Burrumbeet
Mena Park	Bo Peep	Cardigan Village
	Haddon

Bo Peep is a locality on the Western rural fringe of the City of Ballarat municipality in Victoria, Australia. At the 2021 census, Bo Peep had a population of 25.
