= Golden Plains Shire =

Coordinates: 38°01′00″S 143°58′00″E

- Local government area
- Location in Victoria

- Interactive map of Golden Plains Shire
- Country: Australia
- State: Victoria
- Region: Grampians
- Established: 1994
- Council seat: Bannockburn

Government
  - Mayor: Emma Robbins
  - State electorates: Eureka; Geelong; Ripon
  - Federal divisions: Ballarat; Corio; Wannon

Area
  - Total: 2,703 km^{2} (1,044 sq mi)

Population
  - Total: 23,120 (2018)
  - Density: 8.553/km^{2} (22.153/sq mi)
- Gazetted: 6 May 1994
- Website: Golden Plains Shire
LGAs around Golden Plains Shire
Pyrenees	Ballarat	Moorabool
Corangamite	Golden Plains Shire	Greater Geelong
Corangamite	Colac Otway	Surf Coast

The Golden Plains Shire is a local government area in Victoria, Australia, located in the central-western part of the state. It covers an area of 2,703 square kilometres (1,044 mi^{2}) and in June 2018, had a population of 23,120. It includes the towns of Bannockburn, Inverleigh, Lethbridge, Linton, Meredith, Rokewood, Smythesdale and Teesdale.

The Shire is governed and administered by the Golden Plains Shire Council. Its seat of local government and administrative centre is located at the Golden Plains Civic Centre in Bannockburn, and it also has a service centre located in Smythesdale.

== History ==
The Shire was formed on 6 May 1994 by the amalgamation of the Shire of Bannockburn (specifically, the territory remaining after part of that Shire was absorbed into the new City of Greater Geelong in May 1993), the Shire of Leigh, the bulk of the Shire of Grenville and part of the Shire of Buninyong. Upon its creation, it was known as the Southern Rural Shire and was intended to exist temporarily until the Local Government Board drew up final council boundaries for the Ballarat region. However, a few months later it was decided to make the municipality permanent, and it was renamed to Golden Plains Shire on 1 October 1994.

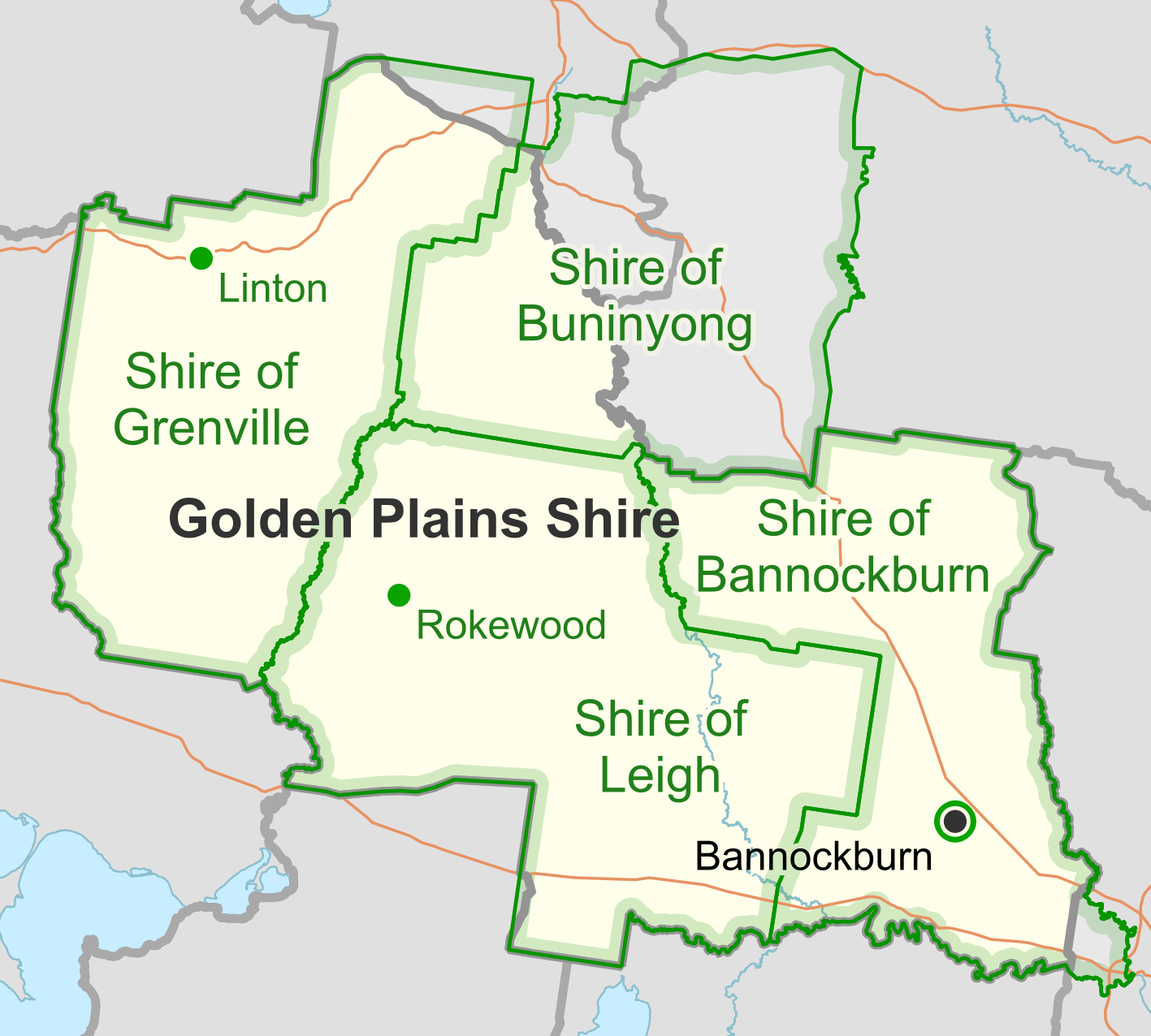
Golden Plains Shire's predecessor LGAs (green) as they were in 1993

In 2025, based on Victorian government statistics for the year ending September 2025, measured by the criminal incident rate per 100,000 population, Golden Plains had the lowest crime rate of any Victorian municipality.

== Council ==
=== Current composition ===
The council is composed of seven councillors elected to represent an unsubdivided municipality. The current councillors are:

Ward	Party	Councillor	Notes
Unsubdivided	Independent	Sarah Hayden	
Unsubdivided	Independent	Des Phelan	
Unsubdivided	Independent	Emma Robbins	Mayor
Unsubdivided	Independent	Helena Kirby	
Unsubdivided	Independent	Owen Sharkey	Deputy Mayor
Unsubdivided	Greens	Gavin Gamble	
Unsubdivided	Independent	Dom Cook	

=== Administration and governance ===
The council meets on alternate months in the council chamber at the Golden Plains Civic Centre in Bannockburn, which is also the location of the council's administrative activities, and at The Well in Smythesdale. It also provides customer services at both its administrative centre in Bannockburn, and its service centre in Smythesdale.

== Climate ==
Climate data for She Oaks (She Oaks 1991–2020, records 1990–2020)
Month	Jan	Feb	Mar	Apr	May	Jun	Jul	Aug	Sep	Oct	Nov	Dec	Year
Record high °C (°F)	43.7 (110.7)	45.2 (113.4)	39.3 (102.7)	33.4 (92.1)	26.6 (79.9)	23.6 (74.5)	20.8 (69.4)	23.2 (73.8)	28.4 (83.1)	35.2 (95.4)	39.1 (102.4)	42.0 (107.6)	45.2 (113.4)
Mean daily maximum °C (°F)	26.1 (79.0)	25.5 (77.9)	23.1 (73.6)	19.3 (66.7)	15.6 (60.1)	12.9 (55.2)	12.3 (54.1)	13.3 (55.9)	15.5 (59.9)	18.4 (65.1)	21.2 (70.2)	23.8 (74.8)	18.9 (66.0)
Daily mean °C (°F)	19.3 (66.7)	19.2 (66.6)	17.2 (63.0)	14.1 (57.4)	11.5 (52.7)	9.2 (48.6)	8.7 (47.7)	9.3 (48.7)	10.9 (51.6)	12.9 (55.2)	15.2 (59.4)	17.2 (63.0)	13.7 (56.7)
Mean daily minimum °C (°F)	12.4 (54.3)	12.8 (55.0)	11.2 (52.2)	8.8 (47.8)	7.3 (45.1)	5.5 (41.9)	5.1 (41.2)	5.3 (41.5)	6.2 (43.2)	7.3 (45.1)	9.1 (48.4)	10.5 (50.9)	8.5 (47.3)
Record low °C (°F)	2.0 (35.6)	2.9 (37.2)	−0.9 (30.4)	−2.2 (28.0)	−2.9 (26.8)	−3.5 (25.7)	−4.2 (24.4)	−3.1 (26.4)	−2.5 (27.5)	−1.8 (28.8)	−0.2 (31.6)	−0.6 (30.9)	−4.2 (24.4)
Average precipitation mm (inches)	34.3 (1.35)	39.9 (1.57)	24.6 (0.97)	38.8 (1.53)	38.3 (1.51)	41.8 (1.65)	40.8 (1.61)	43.8 (1.72)	48.2 (1.90)	51.9 (2.04)	59.5 (2.34)	30.6 (1.20)	493.6 (19.43)
Average rainy days	7.4	7.5	8.3	11.1	14.8	15.7	17.5	17.0	15.7	13.1	10.3	8.5	146.9
Average afternoon relative humidity (%)	47	48	49	54	66	72	70	65	63	58	56	48	58

== Townships and localities ==
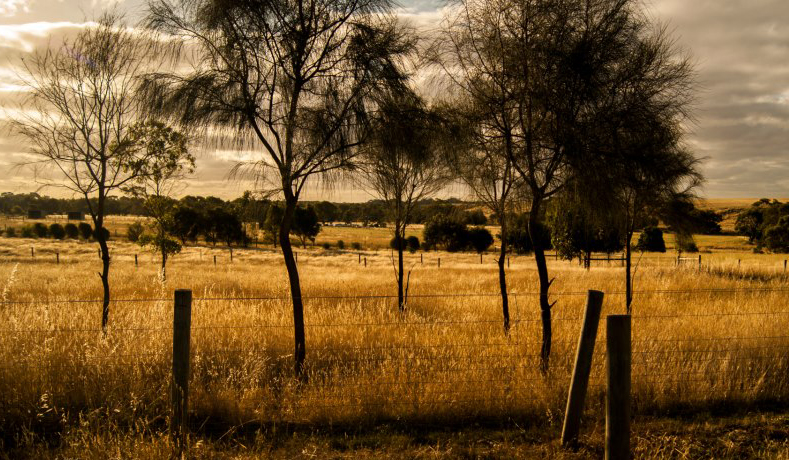
Typical scenery of the Golden Plains Shire

In the 2021 census, the shire had a population of 24,985, up from 21,688 in the 2016 census.

Population
Locality	2016	2021
Anakie^	690	734
Bamganie	37	44
Bannockburn	5,283	6,470
Barunah Park	27	33
Batesford^	952	1,141
Berringa	167	194
Berrybank^	40	37
Cambrian Hill	251	292
Cape Clear	125	148
Corindhap	132	131
Cressy^	175	176
Dereel	533	664
Durdidwarrah	9	12
Durham Lead^	392	408
Enfield	538	574
Garibaldi	123	131
Gheringhap	155	132
Glengower^	13	15
Grenville^	99	113
Haddon	1,194	1,276
Happy Valley	85	87
Hesse	19	14
Illabarook	32	41
Inverleigh^	1,474	1,746
Lethbridge	1,014	1,181
Linton^	580	635
Mannibadar	80	65
Maude	223	211
Meredith^	788	821
Morrisons^	128	118
Mount Bute^	58	61
Mount Cameron^	9	15
Mount Mercer	69	94
Murgheboluc	131	132
Napoleons	553	555
Newtown	122	189
Nintingbool	173	168
Piggoreet	37	17
Pitfield	48	14
Pittong^	15	12
Rokewood	217	208
Rokewood Junction	32	34
Ross Creek	1,153	1,221
Russells Bridge	67	70
Scarsdale	744	855
She Oaks	107	126
Shelford	253	263
Smythes Creek^	1,467	1,762
Smythesdale^	1,032	1,189
Springdallah	26	35
Staffordshire Reef	45	63
Steiglitz	53	61
Stonehaven	81	79
Stony Creek	6	0
Sutherlands Creek	108	129
Teesdale	1,721	2,308
Wallinduc	37	42
Werneth^	60	66
Willowvale	7	10
Wingeel^	23	26

^ - Territory divided with another LGA

== See also ==
- List of places of worship in Golden Plains Shire
