= Ross Creek, Victoria =

Coordinates: 37°38′05″S 143°45′16″E

Ross Creek, is a locality in the Golden Plains Shire near Ballarat in the Australian State of Victoria. The Post Code for Ross Creek is 3351. The recreation reserve and a general store locality are located on the Sebastopol-Smythesdale Rd.

A watercourse of the same name flows in the Yarrowee River near Napoleons.

== History ==
In 1841 Charles Ross took up a pastoral run and the locality is named after him. Sandwiched between the former gold fields of Ballarat and Woady Yaloak/Smythesdale the area was well forested and was used as a source of timber for gold mining and for supporting underground shafts and the growing of produce to supply the miners.

There was no gold at Ross Creek so there are no scars from early mining experienced. During the 1860s farm allotments were taken up at Ross Creek, and in 1865 a Welsh Congregational church. A school was opened 1 August 1871.

The population peaked prior to the First World War but afterwards rural consolidation occurred and population declined. Interest in the area increased after a series of subdivisions occurred in the 1970s and 1980s. Ballarat is close enough to allow people to commute to work and still have a rural lifestyle.
